= 2010 African Championships in Athletics – Men's 400 metres =

The men's 400 metres at the 2010 African Championships in Athletics were held on July 28–30.

== Medalists ==
Gold	Silver	Bronze
Mohamed Khawaja; Libya	Rabah Yousif; Sudan	Gary Kikaya; Democratic Republic of the Congo

== Results ==
=== Heats ===
Qualification: First 4 of each heat (Q) and the next 4 fastest (q) qualified for the semifinals.

Rank	Heat	Name	Nationality	Time	Notes
1	5	James Godday	Nigeria	46.01	Q
2	5	Isaac Makwala	Botswana	46.07	Q
3	2	Mark Kiprotich Mutai	Kenya	46.11	Q
4	3	Rabah Yousif	Sudan	46.36	Q
5	1	Geoffrey Ngeno	Kenya	46.39	Q
6	4	Gary Kikaya	Democratic Republic of the Congo	46.54	Q
7	5	Ofentse Mogawane	South Africa	46.65	Q
8	3	Obakeng Ngwigwa	Botswana	46.66	Q
9	4	Anderson Mureta Mutegi	Kenya	46.72	Q
10	1	Marvin Lewis	Liberia	46.78	Q
11	3	Mohamed Khawaja	Libya	46.78	Q
12	3	Saul Weigopwa	Nigeria	46.94	Q
13	1	Eric Milazar	Mauritius	46.97	Q
14	4	Noah Akwu	Nigeria	47.03	Q
15	4	Mamadou Gueye	Senegal	47.16	Q
16	2	Bereket Desta	Ethiopia	47.16	Q
17	1	Saviour Kombe	Zambia	47.45	Q
18	3	Emmanuel Tugumisirize	Uganda	47.88	q
19	5	Lukungu Waisswa	Uganda	48.13	Q
20	3	David Tinago	Zimbabwe	48.42	q
21	2	Gift Soko	Zambia	48.55	Q
22	5	Zemenu Kassaw	Ethiopia	48.65	q
23	3	Yaovi Michael Gougou	Benin	49.06	q
24	2	Ramadhan Akula	Uganda	49.07	Q
25	4	Nicolau Ernesto Palanca	Angola	49.54	
26	2	Thimote Bagina	Rwanda	49.97	
27	2	Jeremias Silva	Guinea-Bissau	50.16	SB
	4	Hago Tadesse	Ethiopia	DQ	
	1	Sakaria Kamberuka	Botswana	DNF	
	5	Fousseni Mathie Gnanligo	Benin	DNF	
	1	Golden Gunde	Malawi	DNS	
	1	Sandro Rocha	Cape Verde	DNS	
	1	Michael Taapatsa	Zimbabwe	DNS	
	2	Jean Francois Degrace	Mauritius	DNS	
	2	Awad Makki	Sudan	DNS	
	4	Nelton Ndebele	Zimbabwe	DNS	
	5	Fernando Augustin	Mauritius	DNS	

=== Semifinals ===
Qualification: First 2 of each semifinal (Q) and the next 2 fastest (q) qualified for the final.

Rank	Heat	Name	Nationality	Time	Notes
1	3	Mohamed Khawaja	Libya	45.42	Q, SB
2	2	Gary Kikaya	Democratic Republic of the Congo	45.55	Q
3	2	Mark Kiprotich Mutai	Kenya	45.69	Q, SB
4	1	Rabah Yousif	Sudan	45.82	Q
5	3	Anderson Mureta Mutegi	Kenya	45.83	Q
6	1	Bereket Desta	Ethiopia	45.97	Q
7	2	Obakeng Ngwigwa	Botswana	46.12	q
8	1	Saul Weigopwa	Nigeria	46.21	q
9	1	Marvin Lewis	Liberia	46.26	PB
10	2	Ofentse Mogawane	South Africa	46.41	
11	1	Geoffrey Ngeno	Kenya	46.45	
12	3	James Godday	Nigeria	46.55	
13	3	Eric Milazar	Mauritius	46.79	
14	3	Isaac Makwala	Botswana	46.92	
15	2	Mamadou Gueye	Senegal	46.98	
16	3	Saviour Kombe	Zambia	47.32	
17	1	Emmanuel Tugumisirize	Uganda	47.44	
18	1	David Tinago	Zimbabwe	47.95	
19	1	Gift Soko	Zambia	48.20	
20	3	Lukungu Waisswa	Uganda	48.39	
21	2	Ramadhan Akula	Uganda	48.48	
22	2	Zemenu Kassaw	Ethiopia	49.04	
23	3	Yaovi Michael Gougou	Benin	49.27	
	2	Noah Akwu	Nigeria	DNS	

=== Final ===
Rank	Lane	Name	Nationality	Time	Notes
1st place, gold medalist(s)	3	Mohamed Khawaja	Libya	44.98	NR
2nd place, silver medalist(s)	5	Rabah Yousif	Sudan	45.18	
3rd place, bronze medalist(s)	6	Gary Kikaya	Democratic Republic of the Congo	45.28	
4	4	Mark Kiprotich Mutai	Kenya	45.28	SB
5	2	Obakeng Ngwigwa	Botswana	45.50	PB
6	7	Anderson Mureta Mutegi	Kenya	45.62	
7	1	Saul Weigopwa	Nigeria	45.93	
8	8	Bereket Desta	Ethiopia	47.14	
