= 2010 African Championships in Athletics – Men's 200 metres =

The men's 200 metres at the 2010 African Championships in Athletics were held on July 31–August 1.

== Medalists ==
| Gold | Silver | Bronze |
|---|---|---|
| Amr Ibrahi Mostafa Seoud; Egypt | Ben Youssef Meité; Ivory Coast | Simon Magakwe; South Africa |

== Results ==
=== Heats ===
Qualification: First 2 of each heat (Q) and the next 8 fastest (q) qualified for the semifinals.

| Rank | Heat | Name | Nationality | Time | Notes |
|---|---|---|---|---|---|
| 1 | 1 | Obinna Metu | Nigeria | 20.82 | Q |
| 2 | 8 | Ben Youssef Meité | Ivory Coast | 20.90 | Q |
| 3 | 5 | Amr Ibrahi Mostafa Seoud | Egypt | 20.95 | Q |
| 4 | 2 | Anderson Mureta Mutegi | Kenya | 20.99 | Q |
| 5 | 8 | Allah Laryea-Akrong | Ghana | 21.01 | Q |
| 6 | 3 | Fanuel Kenosi | Botswana | 21.10 | Q |
| 7 | 6 | Aziz Ouhadi | Morocco | 21.13 | Q |
| 8 | 2 | Fred Agbaje | Nigeria | 21.16 | Q |
| 9 | 8 | Hitjivirue Kaanjuka | Namibia | 21.20 | q |
| 10 | 1 | Simon Magakwe | South Africa | 21.25 | Q |
| 11 | 8 | Delivert Kimbembe | Republic of the Congo | 21.25 | q |
| 12 | 2 | Ali Ngaimoko | Uganda | 21.27 | q |
| 13 | 8 | Kipkemoi Soy | Kenya | 21.29 | q, SB |
| 14 | 5 | Thuso Mpuang | South Africa | 21.33 | Q |
| 15 | 7 | Mouhamadou Lamine Niang | Senegal | 21.36 | Q |
| 16 | 1 | Nana Kofi Sanah | Ghana | 21.37 | q |
| 17 | 1 | Eric Milazar | Mauritius | 21.40 | q |
| 18 | 3 | Stephen Barasa | Kenya | 21.41 | Q, SB |
| 19 | 6 | Fabrice Coiffic | Mauritius | 21.43 | Q |
| 20 | 7 | Lehata Mosito | Lesotho | 21.48 | Q |
| 21 | 3 | Abdourahmane Ndour | Senegal | 21.50 | q |
| 22 | 3 | Suwaibou Sanneh | Gambia | 21.50 | q |
| 23 | 6 | Wilfried Koffi Hua | Ivory Coast | 21.52 | |
| 24 | 2 | Pierre Paul Bisseck | Cameroon | 21.53 | |
| 25 | 1 | Moussa Sissoko | Mali | 21.54 | |
| 26 | 4 | Mhadjou Youssouf | Comoros | 21.55 | Q |
| 27 | 4 | Emmanuel Kubi | Ghana | 21.57 | Q |
| 28 | 3 | Jesse Urikhob | Namibia | 21.64 | |
| 29 | 7 | Idrissa Adam | Cameroon | 21.66 | |
| 30 | 6 | Titus Kafunda | Zambia | 21.72 | |
| 30 | 5 | Ogho-Oghene Egwero | Nigeria | 21.72 | |
| 32 | 5 | Saviour Kombe | Zambia | 21.95 | |
| 33 | 8 | Hago Tadesse | Ethiopia | 21.97 | |
| 34 | 7 | Siapade Marius Loua | Ivory Coast | 22.01 | |
| 35 | 5 | Lazarous Inya | Uganda | 22.04 | |
| 36 | 6 | Neddy Marie | Seychelles | 22.12 | |
| 37 | 6 | Ousmane Jibba | Gambia | 22.13 | |
| 38 | 4 | Augustino Mande | Tanzania | 22.14 | |
| 39 | 8 | Leeroy Henriette | Seychelles | 22.19 | SB |
| 40 | 7 | Abyot Lencho | Ethiopia | 22.22 | |
| 41 | 1 | François Belinga | Cameroon | 22.26 | |
| 42 | 1 | Ghyd Olonghot | Republic of the Congo | 22.32 | |
| 43 | 4 | Anthony Okiror | Uganda | 22.44 | |
| 44 | 1 | Laurent Masatu | Tanzania | 22.59 | |
| 45 | 7 | Mafo Tshihinga | Democratic Republic of the Congo | 22.69 | |
| 46 | 6 | Dylan Rensburg | Zimbabwe | 22.75 | |
| 47 | 7 | Saidi Hamsi Ndayisaba | Rwanda | 22.93 | |
| 48 | 8 | Kabongo Mulumba | Democratic Republic of the Congo | 23.22 | |
| | 4 | Tezera Chamia | Ethiopia | DNF | |
| | 2 | Innocent Bologo | Burkina Faso | DNS | |
| | 2 | Mohamed Khawaja | Libya | DNS | |
| | 2 | Musa Mlekwa | Tanzania | DNS | |
| | 3 | Wilfried Bingangoye | Gabon | DNS | |
| | 3 | Ibrahim Kabia | Sierra Leone | DNS | |
| | 3 | Felix Mwango | Malawi | DNS | |
| | 4 | Brian Dzingai | Zimbabwe | DNS | |
| | 4 | Gérard Kobéané | Burkina Faso | DNS | |
| | 5 | Narcisse Dingamyo | Chad | DNS | |
| | 5 | Momodou Lamin Kujabi | Gambia | DNS | |
| | 5 | Michael Taapatsa | Zimbabwe | DNS | |
| | 6 | Nicolau Ernesto Palanca | Angola | DNS | |
| | 7 | Ahmed Ondimba Bongo | Mauritius | DNS | |

=== Semifinals ===
Qualification: First 2 of each semifinal (Q) and the next 2 fastest (q) qualified for the final.

| Rank | Heat | Name | Nationality | Time | Notes |
|---|---|---|---|---|---|
| 1 | 3 | Aziz Ouhadi | Morocco | 20.51 | Q, NR |
| 2 | 3 | Obinna Metu | Nigeria | 20.65 | Q |
| 3 | 1 | Ben Youssef Meité | Ivory Coast | 20.76 | Q, SB |
| 4 | 2 | Amr Ibrahi Mostafa Seoud | Egypt | 20.80 | Q |
| 5 | 1 | Simon Magakwe | South Africa | 20.87 | Q |
| 6 | 1 | Fanuel Kenosi | Botswana | 20.89 | q |
| 7 | 3 | Thuso Mpuang | South Africa | 20.90 | q |
| 8 | 3 | Delivert Kimbembe | Republic of the Congo | 20.91 | SB |
| 9 | 2 | Anderson Mureta Mutegi | Kenya | 20.96 | Q |
| 10 | 3 | Mouhamadou Lamine Niang | Senegal | 20.98 | |
| 11 | 1 | Kipkemoi Soy | Kenya | 21.00 | SB |
| 12 | 2 | Fred Agbaje | Nigeria | 21.02 | |
| 13 | 2 | Allah Laryea-Akrong | Ghana | 21.04 | |
| 14 | 2 | Lehata Mosito | Lesotho | 21.19 | PB |
| 15 | 2 | Hitjivirue Kaanjuka | Namibia | 21.35 | |
| 16 | 1 | Mhadjou Youssouf | Comoros | 21.38 | SB |
| 17 | 1 | Abdourahmane Ndour | Senegal | 21.41 | |
| 18 | 1 | Fabrice Coiffic | Mauritius | 21.43 | |
| 19 | 2 | Ali Ngaimoko | Uganda | 21.46 | |
| 20 | 2 | Eric Milazar | Mauritius | 21.50 | |
| 21 | 1 | Emmanuel Kubi | Ghana | 21.51 | |
| 22 | 3 | Nana Kofi Sanah | Ghana | 21.53 | |
| 23 | 3 | Suwaibou Sanneh | Gambia | 21.58 | |
| 24 | 3 | Stephen Barasa | Kenya | 21.63 | SB |

=== Final ===
Wind: +1.30 m/s

| Rank | Lane | Name | Nationality | Time | Notes |
|---|---|---|---|---|---|
| 1st place, gold medalist(s) | 3 | Amr Ibrahi Mostafa Seoud | Egypt | 20.36 | NR |
| 2nd place, silver medalist(s) | 4 | Ben Youssef Meité | Ivory Coast | 20.39 | SB |
| 3rd place, bronze medalist(s) | 8 | Simon Magakwe | South Africa | 20.56 | |
| 4 | 5 | Aziz Ouhadi | Morocco | 20.59 | |
| 5 | 6 | Obinna Metu | Nigeria | 20.72 | |
| 6 | 7 | Anderson Mureta Mutegi | Kenya | 20.81 | |
| 7 | 2 | Thuso Mpuang | South Africa | 21.09 | |
| 8 | 1 | Fanuel Kenosi | Botswana | 21.22 | |
