= Athletics at the 2010 Commonwealth Games – Men's 400 metres =

Men's 400 metres at the Commonwealth Games

The Men's 400 metres at the 2010 Commonwealth Games as part of the athletics programme was held at the Jawaharlal Nehru Stadium on Thursday 7 October till Saturday 9 October 2010.

The winning margin was 0.02 seconds equalling the winning margin from the men's 400 metres final at the Manchester games in 2002. As of 2024, these remain the closest finals in the men's 400 metres at these games since the introduction of fully automatic timing.

The top three runners in each of the initial six heats automatically qualified for the second round. The next six fastest runners from across the heats also qualified. Those 24 runners competed in three semi-finals, with the top two runners from each heat qualifying for the final plus the two fastest runners.

== Records ==
| World Record | 43.18 | Michael Johnson | United States | Seville, Spain | 26 August 1999 |
| Games Record | 44.52 | Iwan Thomas | WAL | Kuala Lumpur, Malaysia | 1998 |

== Round 1 ==
First 3 in each heat (Q) and 6 best performers (q) advance to the Semifinals.

=== Heat 1 ===
| Rank | Lane | Name | Reaction Time | Result | Notes |
|---|---|---|---|---|---|
| 1 | 3 | Conrad Williams (ENG) | 0.214 | 45.78 | Q |
| 2 | 5 | Michael Mathieu (BAH) | 0.169 | 46.22 | Q |
| 3 | 4 | Alli Ngaimoko (UGA) | 0.221 | 46.79 | Q |
| 4 | 6 | Prasanna Amarasekara (SRI) | 0.172 | 47.50 | q |
| 5 | 8 | Saaid Hassan (MDV) | 0.177 | 48.56 | NR |
| 6 | 7 | Thomas Vandy (SLE) | 0.241 | 49.16 | |
| 7 | 2 | John Rivan (PNG) | 0.236 | 50.48 | |

=== Heat 2 ===
| Rank | Lane | Name | Reaction Time | Result | Notes |
|---|---|---|---|---|---|
| 1 | 8 | Ramon Miller (BAH) | 0.182 | 46.12 | Q, SB |
| 2 | 6 | Ben Offereins (AUS) | 0.188 | 46.85 | Q |
| 3 | 3 | Sakarea Kamberuka (BOT) | 0.340 | 47.06 | Q |
| 4 | 2 | Graham Hedman (ENG) | 0.171 | 47.45 | q |
| 5 | 4 | Harpreet Singh (IND) | 0.213 | 48.29 | |
| 6 | 5 | Hywel Robinson (GUE) | 0.211 | 50.08 | |
| – | 7 | Jimmy Noklam (VAN) | 0.247 | | DNF |

=== Heat 3 ===
| Rank | Lane | Name | Reaction Time | Result | Notes |
|---|---|---|---|---|---|
| 1 | 3 | Andretti Bain (BAH) | 0.192 | 46.19 | Q |
| 2 | 8 | Robert Tobin (ENG) | 0.208 | 46.26 | Q |
| 3 | 5 | Vincent Kiilo (KEN) | 0.218 | 46.89 | Q |
| 4 | 7 | Jean Degrace (MRI) | 0.195 | 47.21 | q, SB |
| 5 | 6 | Bockarie Sesay (SLE) | 0.236 | 48.72 | |
| 6 | 4 | Hussain Inaas (MDV) | 0.193 | 49.64 | PB |
| 7 | 2 | Reonardo Harvey (TCI) | 0.155 | 51.17 | |

=== Heat 4 ===
| Rank | Lane | Name | Reaction Time | Result | Notes |
|---|---|---|---|---|---|
| 1 | 4 | Mark Muttai (KEN) | 0.257 | 45.90 | Q |
| 2 | 8 | Joel Milburn (AUS) | 0.255 | 46.72 | Q |
| 3 | 2 | Isaac Makwala (BOT) | 0.209 | 47.39 | Q |
| 4 | 6 | Tom Druce (GUE) | 0.192 | 47.70 | q |
| 5 | 5 | Gift Soko (ZAM) | 0.228 | 48.45 | |
| 6 | 3 | Arnold Sorina (VAN) | 0.225 | 48.97 | SB |
| 7 | 7 | Peter Semper (MNT) | 0.172 | 51.21 | |

=== Heat 5 ===
| Rank | Lane | Name | Reaction Time | Result | Notes |
|---|---|---|---|---|---|
| 1 | 4 | Oral Thompson (JAM) | 0.173 | 46.60 | Q |
| 2 | 6 | Obakeng Ngwingwa (BOT) | 0.249 | 46.79 | Q |
| 3 | 7 | Lalonde Gordon (TRI) | 0.208 | 47.07 | Q |
| 4 | 5 | Nelson Stone (PNG) | 0.300 | 47.22 | q |
| 5 | 3 | Golden Gunde (MAW) | 0.246 | 48.57 | NR |
| 6 | 2 | Ismaila Manga (GAM) | 0.164 | 49.02 | |

=== Heat 6 ===
| Rank | Lane | Name | Reaction Time | Result | Notes |
|---|---|---|---|---|---|
| 1 | 2 | Erison Hurtault (DMA) | 0.181 | 46.50 | Q |
| 2 | 8 | Sean Wroe (AUS) | 0.206 | 46.82 | Q |
| 3 | 7 | Savior Kombe (ZAM) | 0.211 | 46.88 | Q |
| 4 | 5 | Geoffrey Ngeno (KEN) | 0.285 | 47.40 | q |
| 5 | 6 | Jean Augustin (MRI) | 0.236 | 48.43 | NR |
| 6 | 3 | Ibrahim Turay (SLE) | 0.216 | 50.96 | |
| 7 | 4 | Akeame Mussington (ANG) | 0.187 | 51.39 | NR |

== Semifinals ==
First 2 in each heat (Q) and 2 best performers (q) advance to the Final.

=== Semifinal 1 ===
| Rank | Lane | Name | Reaction Time | Result | Notes |
|---|---|---|---|---|---|
| 1 | 7 | Mark Muttai (KEN) | 0.260 | 45.63 | Q |
| 2 | 5 | Sean Wroe (AUS) | 0.212 | 45.64 | Q |
| 3 | 6 | Andretti Bain (BAH) | 0.178 | 46.18 | |
| 4 | 4 | Robert Tobin (ENG) | 0.185 | 46.27 | |
| 5 | 3 | Nelson Stone (PNG) | 0.277 | 46.70 | NR |
| 6 | 2 | Prasanna Amarasekara (SRI) | 0.151 | 46.87 | SB |
| 7 | 9 | Sakarea Kamberuka (BOT) | 0.267 | 46.91 | |
| 8 | 8 | Savior Kombe (ZAM) | 0.187 | 47.12 | |

=== Semifinal 2 ===
| Rank | Lane | Name | Reaction Time | Result | Notes |
|---|---|---|---|---|---|
| 1 | 7 | Michael Mathieu (BAH) | 0.166 | 45.72 | Q |
| 2 | 4 | Conrad Williams (ENG) | 0.201 | 45.82 | Q |
| 3 | 6 | Ben Offereins (AUS) | 0.210 | 46.11 | q |
| 4 | 9 | Alli Ngaimoko (UGA) | 0.241 | 46.63 | SB |
| 5 | 5 | Oral Thompson (JAM) | 0.130 | 46.77 | |
| 6 | 8 | Isaac Makwala (BOT) | 0.287 | 47.07 | |
| 7 | 3 | Jean Degrace (MRI) | 0.186 | 47.52 | |
| 8 | 2 | Geoffrey Ngeno (KEN) | 0.248 | 49.31 | |

=== Semifinal 3 ===
| Rank | Lane | Name | Reaction Time | Result | Notes |
|---|---|---|---|---|---|
| 1 | 5 | Ramon Miller (BAH) | 0.188 | 45.67 | Q, SB |
| 2 | 6 | Joel Milburn (AUS) | 0.208 | 45.79 | Q |
| 3 | 4 | Erison Hurtault (DMA) | 0.185 | 45.93 | q |
| 4 | 9 | Lalonde Gordon (TRI) | 0.221 | 46.33 | PB |
| 5 | 8 | Vincent Kiilo (KEN) | 0.199 | 46.50 | SB |
| 6 | 7 | Obakeng Ngwingwa (BOT) | 0.213 | 46.82 | |
| 7 | 3 | Graham Hedman (ENG) | 0.186 | 47.02 | |
| 8 | 2 | Tom Druce (GUE) | 0.178 | 48.30 | |

== Final ==
| Rank | Lane | Name | Reaction Time | Result | Notes |
|---|---|---|---|---|---|
| 1st place, gold medalist(s) | 5 | Mark Muttai (KEN) | 0.227 | 45.44 | |
| 2nd place, silver medalist(s) | 6 | Sean Wroe (AUS) | 0.195 | 45.46 | |
| 3rd place, bronze medalist(s) | 4 | Ramon Miller (BAH) | 0.185 | 45.55 | SB |
| 4 | 7 | Michael Mathieu (BAH) | 0.177 | 45.56 | =SB |
| 5 | 9 | Joel Milburn (AUS) | 0.241 | 45.71 | SB |
| 6 | 8 | Conrad Williams (ENG) | 0.199 | 45.88 | |
| 7 | 2 | Ben Offereins (AUS) | 0.190 | 46.00 | |
| 8 | 3 | Erison Hurtault (DMA) | 0.199 | 46.07 | |
