= Athletics at the 2011 All-Africa Games – Men's 4 × 400 metres relay =

The men's 4 x 400 metres relay event at the 2011 All-Africa Games was held on 15 September.

== Results ==
Rank	Nation	Athletes	Time	Notes
1st place, gold medalist(s)	Kenya	Anderson Mureta Mutegi, Jonathan Kibet, Vincent Mumo, Mark Mutai	3:03.10	
2nd place, silver medalist(s)	Nigeria	?, ?, ?, James Godday	3:05.26	
3rd place, bronze medalist(s)	Botswana	Zacharia Kamberuka, Obakeng Ngwigwa, Tsepho Kelaotse, Isaac Makwala	3:05.92	
4	Sudan	?, ?, ?, ?	3:08.67	
5	Zimbabwe	?, ?, ?, ?	3:10.71	
6	Mozambique	?, ?, ?, ?	3:18.98	
