= 2012 African Championships in Athletics – Men's 400 metres =

The men's 400 metres at the 2012 African Championships in Athletics was held at the Stade Charles de Gaulle on 27, 28 and 29 June.

== Medalists ==
Gold	Isaac Makwala; Botswana
Silver	Oscar Pistorius; South Africa
Bronze	Willem de Beer; South Africa

== Records ==
Standing records prior to the 2012 African Championships in Athletics
World record	Michael Johnson (USA)	43.18	Seville, Spain	26 August 1999
African record	Gary Kikaya (COD)	44.10	Stuttgart, Germany	9 September 2006
Championship record	Clement Chukwu (NGR)	44.65	Dakar, Senegal	20 August 1998

== Schedule ==
Date	Time	Round
27 June 2012	15:45	Round 1
28 June 2012	16:10	Semifinals
29 June 2012	15:45	Final

== Results ==
=== Round 1 ===
First 4 in each heat (Q) and 4 best performers (q) advance to the Semifinals.

Rank	Heat	Lane	Name	Nationality	Time	Note
1	5	4	Isaac Makwala	Botswana	45.50	Q
2	2	2	Abiola Onakoya	Nigeria	46.04	Q
3	5	6	Oscar Pistorius	South Africa	46.32	Q
4	2	3	Ofentse Mogawane	South Africa	46.37	Q
5	5	3	Mohamed Khouaja	Libya	46.40	Q
6	2	8	Ali Ngaimoko	Uganda	46.43	Q
7	4	6	Saviour Kombe	Zambia	46.49	Q
8	5	7	Mathieu Gnanligo	Benin	46.50	Q
9	3	5	Salihu Isah	Nigeria	46.58	Q
9	3	8	Thapelo Ketlogetswe	Botswana	46.58	Q
11	1	2	Vincent Kiilu Mumo	Kenya	46.73	Q
12	1	4	Seguo Ogunkule	Nigeria	46.77	Q
13	3	7	Willem de Beer	South Africa	46.80	Q
14	2	4	Bereket Desta	Ethiopia	47.02	Q
15	5	8	Marvin Lewis	Liberia	47.12	q
16	4	8	Daniel Gyasi	Ghana	47.25	Q
17	1	7	Frank Puriza	Namibia	47.37	Q
18	1	3	Nicholas Fordjour	Ghana	47.39	Q
19	4	3	Hago Tadesse	Ethiopia	47.47	Q
20	3	6	Mark Mutai	Kenya	47.48	Q
21	3	4	Mohamedine Mahamadou	Niger	47.89	q
22	3	2	Ali Abd Salem	Libya	47.96	q
23	2	7	Yaovi Michael Gougou	Benin	48.08	q
24	5	2	David Tinago	Zimbabwe	48.53	
25	4	1	Pako Seribe	Botswana	49.12	Q
26	4	7	Djakalia Bamba	Mali	49.19	
27	5	5	Gonfa Bekele	Ethiopia	49.64	
28	1	5	Abdoul Razack Robo Samma	Niger	49.71	
29	4	5	Emmanuel Ntakiyimana	Rwanda	49.75	
30	1	8	Christ Bitsindou	Republic of the Congo	50.28	
31	1	1	Abdallah Al Bain Abbo	Chad	50.30	
32	1	6	Djama Iitireh Said	Djibouti	50.89	
33	3	3	Izequiel Evora	Cape Verde	51.56	
	2	5	Anderson Mureta	Kenya	DSQ	
	2	6	Jiddou Ould Haye	Mauritania	DNS	
	4	2	Abdelkerim Mohammed	Eritrea	DNS	
	4	4	Youssef Rabat	Sudan	DNS	

=== Semifinals ===
First 2 in each heat (Q) and 2 best performers (q) advance to the Final.

Rank	Heat	Lane	Name	Nationality	Time	Note
1	2	3	Isaac Makwala	Botswana	45.70	Q
2	2	6	Oscar Pistorius	South Africa	46.14	Q
3	1	7	Mathieu Gnanligo	Benin	46.32	Q
4	1	8	Willem de Beer	South Africa	46.33	Q
5	3	5	Vincent Kiilu Mumo	Kenya	46.39	Q
6	1	6	Salihu Isah	Nigeria	46.46	q
7	3	6	Abiola Onakoya	Nigeria	46.64	Q
8	1	5	Ali Ngaimoko	Uganda	46.68	q
9	3	3	Ofentse Mogawane	South Africa	46.79	
10	3	4	Mohamed Khouaja	Libya	46.82	
11	3	8	Bereket Desta	Ethiopia	47.05	
12	3	7	Frank Puriza	Namibia	47.13	
13	2	4	Seguo Ogunkule	Nigeria	47.14	
14	1	5	Saviour Kombe	Zambia	47.24	
15	2	1	Mark Mutai	Kenya	47.35	
16	1	4	Daniel Gyasi	Ghana	47.86	
17	1	1	Mohamedine Mahamadou	Niger	47.95	
18	1	3	Thapelo Ketlogetswe	Botswana	47.96	
19	2	7	Nicholas Fordjour	Ghana	48.14	
20	2	8	Hago Tadesse	Ethiopia	48.19	
22	2	2	Ali Abd Salem	Libya	48.57	
22	3	2	Yaovi Michael Gougou	Benin	48.65	
	1	3	Marvin Lewis	Liberia	DNF	
	3	1	Pako Seribe	Botswana	DNF	

=== Final ===
Rank	Lane	Name	Nationality	Time	Note
1st place, gold medalist(s)	5	Isaac Makwala	Botswana	45.25	PB
2nd place, silver medalist(s)	3	Oscar Pistorius	South Africa	45.52	
3rd place, bronze medalist(s)	7	Willem de Beer	South Africa	45.67	
4	6	Mathieu Gnanligo	Benin	45.82	NR
5	4	Vincent Kiilu Mumo	Kenya	46.13	
6	8	Abiola Onakoya	Nigeria	46.21	
7	2	Ali Ngaimoko	Uganda	46.78	
8	1	Salihu Isah	Nigeria	46.98	
