= Athletics at the 2010 Commonwealth Games – Men's 4 × 400 metres relay =

Men's 4 × 400 metres relay at the Commonwealth Games

The Men's 4 × 400 metres relay at the 2010 Commonwealth Games as part of the athletics programme was held at the Jawaharlal Nehru Stadium on Monday 11 October and Tuesday 12 October 2010.

== Records ==
World Record	2:54.29	United States	Stuttgart, Germany	22 August 1993
Games Record	2:59.03	Jamaica	Kuala Lumpur, Malaysia	1998

== Round 1 ==
First 3 in each heat (Q) and 2 best performers (q) advance to the Final.

=== Heat 1 ===
Lane	Nation	Competitors	Time	Notes
5	Kenya	Vincent Koskei, Vincent Kiilo, Mark Muttai, Anderson Mutegi	3:03.66	Q
6	England	Nick Leavey, David Hughes, Richard Yates, Graham Hedman	3:05.34	Q
8	Botswana	Isaac Makwala, Gakologelwang Masheto, Tiroyaone Masake, Zacharia Kamberuka	3:05.40	Q
7	India	Kunhu Puthanpurakkal, Bibin Mathew, Premananad Jayakumar, Mortaja Shake	3:06.30	q
4	Guernsey	Dale Garland, Tom Druce, Hywel Robinson, Matthew Bailey	3:14.51	
2	Mauritius	Jean Vieillesse, Jean Degrace, Jean Augustin, Jean Milazar	3:15.78	
3	Vanuatu	Arnold Sorina, Moses Kamut, David Benjimin, Tony Ialu	3:20.79	

=== Heat 2 ===
Lane	Nation	Competitors	Time	Notes
3	Bahamas	La'Sean Pickstock, Andretti Bain, Jamal Moss, Ramon Miller	3:05.44	Q
7	Australia	Kevin Moore, Ben Offereins, Brendan Cole, Sean Wroe	3:06.01	Q
6	Wales	Rhys Williams, Joe Thomas, Chris Gowell, Gareth Warburton	3:06.31	Q
2	Jamaica	Oral Thompson, Josef Robertson, Ricardo Cunningham, Adrian Findlay	3:06.30	q
5	Sri Lanka	Prasanna Amarasekara, Uditha Wickramasinghe, Nalin Karunarathna, K. Kankanamlage	3:08.77	
4	Sierra Leone	Thomas Vandy, Amara Kamara, Ibrahim Turay, Bockarie Sesay	3:23.68	
5	Nigeria			DNS

== Final ==
Rank	Lane	Nation	Competitors	Time	Notes
1st place, gold medalist(s)	6	Australia	Joel Milburn, Kevin Moore, Brendan Cole, Sean Wroe	3:03.30	
2nd place, silver medalist(s)	7	Kenya	Vincent Koskei, Vincent Kiilo, Anderson Mutegi, Mark Muttai	3:03.84	
3rd place, bronze medalist(s)	4	England	Conrad Williams, Nick Leavey, Richard Yates, Robert Tobin	3:03.97	
4	5	Bahamas	La'Sean Pickstock, Michael Mathieu, Jamal Moss, Ramon Miller	3:04.35	
5	9	Botswana	Zacharia Kamberuka, Gakologelwang Masheto, Isaac Makwala, Obakeng Ngwigwa	3:04.65	
6	8	Wales	Rhys Williams, Joe Thomas, Chris Gowell, Gareth Warburton	3:06.91	
7	2	India	Kunhu Puthanpurakkal, Bibin Mathew, Mortaja Shake, Bineesh Baby	3:07.60	
–	3	Jamaica	Oral Thompson, Lansford Spence, Josef Robertson, Ricardo Cunningham		DSQ
