= Athletics at the 2014 Commonwealth Games – Men's 4 × 400 metres relay =

Men's 4 × 400 metres relay at the Commonwealth Games

The Men's 4 × 400 metres relay at the 2014 Commonwealth Games, as part of the athletics programme, took place at Hampden Park on 1 and 2 August 2014.

== Heats ==
=== Heat 1 ===
Rank	Nation	Members	Result	Notes	Qual.
1	Bahamas	Alonzo Russell; Michael Mathieu; Andretti Bain; Chris Brown	3:03.71		Q
2	Australia	John Steffensen; Alexander Beck; Craig Burns; Ian Dewhurst	3:05.41		Q
3	Canada	Daundre Barnaby; Philip Asei; Brendon Rodney; Michael Robertson	DQ		
4	Uganda	Anthony Okiror; Denis Opio; Alli Ngaimoko; Emmanuel Tugumisirize	DQ		
5	Ghana	Daniel Gyasi; Solomon Afful; Kwadwo Achempong; Emmanuel Dasor	DQ		

=== Heat 2 ===
Rank	Nation	Members	Result	Notes	Qual.
1	Trinidad and Tobago	Lalonde Gordon; Jarrin Solomon; Jehue Gordon; Zwede Hewitt	3:04.06		Q
2	Nigeria	Saihu Isah; Robert Simmons; Noah Akwu; Orukpe Erayokan	3:06.66		Q
3	Zambia	Titus Kafunda; Emmanuel Mwewa; Prince Mumba; Saviour Kombe	3:07.43		q
4	Sri Lanka	Nalin Karunarathna; Chanaka Jayasekara; Anjana Gunarthina; Kasun Senevirathna	3:08.10		
5	Papua New Guinea	Nelson Stone; Theo Piniau; Kaminiel Matlaun; Wala Gime	3:10.30		
6	Kenya	Mark Muttai; Solomon Odongo Buoga; Nicholas Bett; Boniface Mucheru	DQ		

=== Heat 3 ===
Rank	Nation	Members	Result	Notes	Qual.
1	England	Daniel Awde; Matthew Hudson-Smith; Nigel Levine; Conrad Williams	3:03.01		Q
2	Jamaica	Chumaine Fitten; Edino Steele; Hugh Graham Jr; Omar Johnson	3:03.47		Q
3	Scotland	Kris Robertson; Jamie Bowie; Greg Louden; Grant Plenderleith	3:03.94		q
4	Turks and Caicos Islands	Ifeanyi Otuonye; Angelo Garland; Wadly Jean; Courtney Missick	3:19.11		
5	India	Kunhu Muhammed Puthanpurakkal; Jithu Baby; Jibin Jibin Sebastian; Arokia Rajiv	DQ		
6	Sierra Leone		DNS		

== Final ==
Rank	Nation	Members	Result	Notes
1st place, gold medalist(s)	England	Conrad Williams; Michael Bingham; Daniel Awde; Matthew Hudson-Smith	3:00.46	
2nd place, silver medalist(s)	Bahamas	Latoy Williams; Michael Mathieu; Alonzo Russell; Chris Brown	3:00.51	
3rd place, bronze medalist(s)	Trinidad and Tobago	Lalonde Gordon; Jarrin Solomon; Renny Quow; Zwede Hewitt	3:01.51	
4	Jamaica	Akheem Gauntlett; Edino Steele; Chumaine Fitten; Rusheen McDonald	3:02.17	
5	Scotland	Kris Robertson; Grant Plenderleith; Jamie Bowie; Greg Louden	3:04.07	
6	Australia	Craig Burns; Alex Beck; Jarrod Geddes; John Steffensen	3:04.19	
7	Nigeria	Salihu Isah; Miles Ukaoma; Noah Akwu; Cristian Morton	3:04.86	
8	Zambia	Titus Kafunda; Emmanuel Mwewa; Cephas Nyimbili; Saviour Kombe	DQ	
