= Athletics at the 2011 All-Africa Games – Men's 400 metres =

The men's 400 metres event at the 2011 All-Africa Games was held on 11–13 September.

== Medalists ==
| Gold | Silver | Bronze |
|---|---|---|
| Rabah Yousif; Sudan | Tobi Ogunmola; Nigeria | Mark Mutai; Kenya |

== Results ==
=== Heats ===
Qualification: First 3 of each heat (Q) and the next 6 fastest (q) qualified for the semifinals.

| Rank | Heat | Name | Nationality | Time | Notes |
|---|---|---|---|---|---|
| 1 | 4 | Rabah Yousif | Sudan | 45.67 | Q |
| 2 | 4 | Tobi Ogunmola | Nigeria | 46.11 | Q |
| 3 | 4 | Isaac Makwala | Botswana | 46.43 | Q |
| 4 | 1 | Anderson Mureta Mutegi | Kenya | 46.46 | Q |
| 5 | 3 | Mark Mutai | Kenya | 46.48 | Q |
| 6 | 2 | Sakarea Kamberuka | Botswana | 46.66 | Q |
| 7 | 1 | Pako Seribe | Botswana | 46.70 | Q |
| 8 | 3 | Bereket Desta | Ethiopia | 46.74 | Q |
| 9 | 3 | James Godday | Nigeria | 47.00 | Q |
| 10 | 2 | Saviour Kombe | Zambia | 47.24 | Q |
| 11 | 4 | Vincent Mumo | Kenya | 47.68 | q |
| 12 | 2 | Mathieu Gnanligo | Benin | 47.71 | Q |
| 13 | 1 | Segun Ogunkole | Nigeria | 47.81 | Q |
| 14 | 3 | Ali Ngaimoko | Uganda | 48.02 | q |
| 15 | 1 | Hagos Tadesse | Ethiopia | 48.07 | q |
| 16 | 2 | Nelton Ndebele | Zimbabwe | 48.20 | q |
| 17 | 3 | Mancoba Nyoni | Swaziland | 48.51 | |
| 18 | 4 | Mohamed Khouaja | Libya | 48.66 | |
| 19 | 3 | Connias Mudzingwa | Zimbabwe | 48.89 | |
| 20 | 1 | N'Dri Sosthene Kouadio | Ivory Coast | 48.95 | |
| 21 | 2 | Gary Kikaya | Democratic Republic of the Congo | 49.23 | |
| 22 | 1 | Salvador Chitsondzo | Mozambique | 49.39 | |
| 23 | 2 | Jean Kamyamgara | Rwanda | 49.92 | |
| 24 | 1 | David Tinago | Zimbabwe | 50.21 | |
| 25 | 4 | Houssein Nou Ali | Djibouti | 50.94 | |
| 26 | 4 | Gustave Dadabo | Republic of the Congo | 51.12 | |

=== Semifinals ===
Qualification: First 3 of each semifinal (Q) and the next 2 fastest (q) qualified for the final.

| Rank | Heat | Name | Nationality | Time | Notes |
|---|---|---|---|---|---|
| 1 | 1 | Rabah Yousif | Sudan | 45.86 | Q |
| 2 | 1 | Tobi Ogunmola | Nigeria | 46.11 | Q |
| 3 | 2 | Mark Mutai | Kenya | 46.14 | Q |
| 4 | 2 | James Godday | Nigeria | 46.20 | Q |
| 5 | 1 | Isaac Makwala | Botswana | 46.27 | Q |
| 6 | 2 | Bereket Desta | Ethiopia | 46.39 | Q |
| 7 | 1 | Sakarea Kamberuka | Botswana | 46.59 | q |
| 8 | 2 | Pako Seribe | Botswana | 46.69 | q |
| 9 | 2 | Ali Ngaimoko | Uganda | 47.05 | |
| 10 | 1 | Saviour Kombe | Zambia | 47.33 | |
| 11 | 1 | Vincent Mumo | Kenya | 47.51 | |
| 12 | 2 | Anderson Mureta Mutegi | Kenya | 47.77 | |
| 13 | 1 | Segun Ogunkole | Nigeria | 47.83 | |
| 14 | 1 | Nelton Ndebele | Zimbabwe | 48.37 | |
| 15 | 2 | Hagos Tadesse | Ethiopia | 48.78 | |
| | 2 | Mathieu Gnanligo | Benin | DNF | |

=== Final ===
| Rank | Name | Nationality | Time | Notes |
|---|---|---|---|---|
| 1st place, gold medalist(s) | Idrissa Adam | Cameroon | 45.27 | |
| 2nd place, silver medalist(s) | Tobi Ogunmola | Nigeria | 45.82 | |
| 3rd place, bronze medalist(s) | Mark Mutai | Kenya | 46.52 | |
| 4 | Bereket Desta | Ethiopia | 46.56 | |
| 5 | James Godday | Nigeria | 46.58 | |
| 6 | Sakarea Kamberuka | Botswana | 46.60 | |
| 7 | Isaac Makwala | Botswana | 46.78 | |
| 8 | Pako Seribe | Botswana | 46.88 | |
