= 2010 IAAF Continental Cup =

1st IAAF Continental Cup
- Dates: 4–5 September
- Host city: Split, Croatia
- Venue: Stadion Poljud
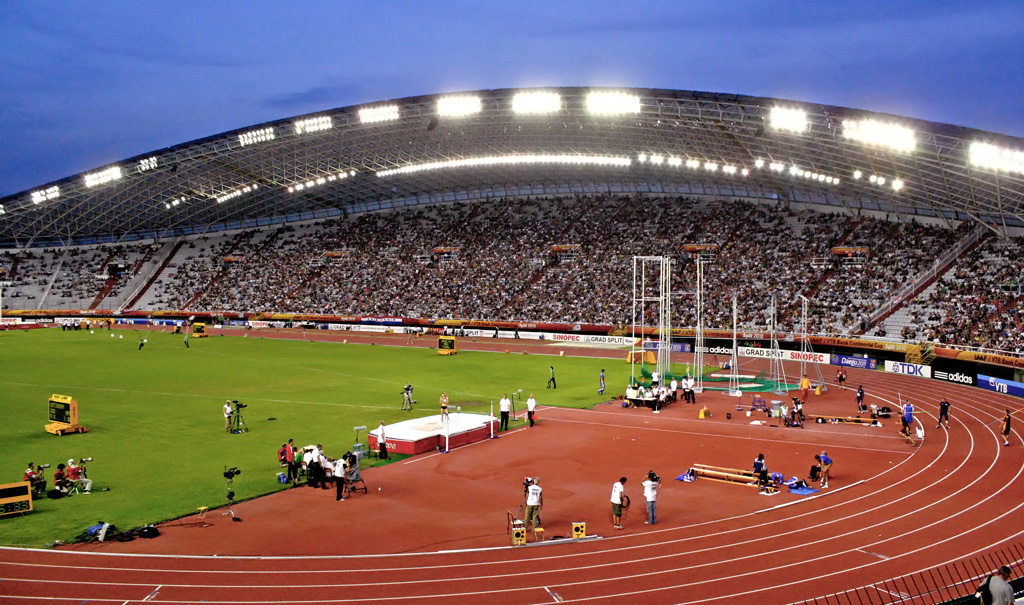
- Events: 40

The 1st IAAF Continental Cup was an international track and field sporting event held under the auspices of the International Association of Athletics Federations. Originally scheduled as the 11th IAAF World Cup in Athletics, it was renamed in 2008 when the IAAF revamped the competition format. It was held in Split, Croatia on 4–5 September 2010.

The competition mascot was an anthropomorphic white seagull with a blue hat and scarf, named Marino. Designed by children from the Juraj Bonači educational centre, the mascot builds on the fact that Split is a coastal city.

The attendance for the second day of the competition was about 25,000.

== Format ==
The four teams competing in the event were Africa, the Americas, Asia-Pacific and Europe. The African and European teams were selected via the results of the 2010 African Championships in Athletics and the 2010 European Athletics Championships, respectively. The Americas team selection was assembled from the athletes at the top of the season's lists on 31 July 2010. Two athletes from each region were selected per event, with the exception of the 1500 metres and long distance track events (where teams may field three athletes, although only two count towards the team points total).

These rules represented a departure from the previous format of the IAAF World Cup. National teams were removed from the programme and the areas governed by the Asian Athletics Association and the Oceania Athletics Association sent a combined team for the first time. The two-day competition comprised a programme of 20 track and field events for men and women, giving a total of 40 events.

Team points by position
Position	1st	2nd	3rd	4th	5th	6th	7th	8th
Points	8	7	6	5	4	3	2	1
Relay points – 1st = 15pts / 2nd = 11pts / 3rd = 7pts / 4th = 3pts

== Standings ==
The standings following the event were:

Rank	Team	Places								Points
Rank	Team	1st	2nd	3rd	4th	5th	6th	7th	8th	Points
1	Europe	13	15	12	16	6	9	2	1	429
2	Americas	13	12	14	7	11	8	6	5	419.5
3	Africa	7	9	7	5	8	10	15	10	292
4	Asia-Pacific	7	4	8	10	11	9	13	10	286.5

After doping disqualifications of Andrei Mikhnevich and Marwa Hussein in 2013, their scores were deleted and others amended, which changed the result in the tight team competition.

The revised scores were:

Rank	Team	Places								Points
Rank	Team	1st	2nd	3rd	4th	5th	6th	7th	8th	Points
1	Americas	13	12	14	8	10	8	6	5	422.5
2	Europe	13	15	11	16	6	9	2	1	417
3	Africa	7	9	7	5	9	9	15	9	293
4	Asia-Pacific	7	4	9	10	11	10	12	10	290.5

Americas were awarded the Continental Cup in a ceremony at the 2014 IAAF Continental Cup.

Further to this, Mariya Abakumova was disqualified following a doping sanction in 2018, and her results deleted with those in the women's javelin amended.

The revised scores are as follows:

Rank	Team	Places								Points
Rank	Team	1st	2nd	3rd	4th	5th	6th	7th	8th	Points
1	Americas	13	12	14	8	11	9	5	5	424.5
2	Europe	12	15	11	15	6	9	2	1	410
3	Africa	8	8	7	6	8	9	15	9	295
4	Asia-Pacific	7	5	8	9	12	11	11	10	292.5

== Medal summary ==
=== Men ===
Event	Gold		Silver		Bronze	
100 metres	Christophe Lemaitre (FRA); Europe	10.06	Daniel Bailey (ATG); Americas	10.10	Mark Lewis-Francis (GBR); Europe	10.16; SB
200 metres	Wallace Spearmon (USA); Americas	19.95	Churandy Martina (AHO); Americas	20.47	Ben-Youssef Méité (CIV); Africa	20.51
400 metres	Jeremy Wariner (USA); Americas	44.22; CR	Ricardo Chambers (JAM); Americas	44.59	Michael Bingham (GBR); Europe	44.84; SB
800 metres	David Rudisha (KEN); Africa	1:43.27; CR	Marcin Lewandowski (POL); Europe	1:44.81	Belal Mansoor Ali (BHR); Asia-Pacific	1:44.92
1500 metres	Amine Laâlou (MAR); Africa	3:35.49	Mekonnen Gebremedhin (ETH); Africa	3:35.70	Leonel Manzano (USA); Americas	3:36.48
3000 metres	Bernard Lagat (USA); Americas	7:54.75	Moses Ndiema Kipsiro (UGA); Africa	7:54.98; SB	Bayron Piedra (ECU); Americas	7:55.52
5000 metres	Bernard Lagat (USA); Americas	13:58.23	Moses Ndiema Kipsiro (UGA); Africa	13:58.35	Bouabdellah Tahri (FRA); Europe	13:58.79
110 metre hurdles	David Oliver (USA); Americas	13.11	Andy Turner (GBR); Europe	13.48	Shi Dongpeng (CHN); Asia-Pacific	13.53
400 metre hurdles	Dai Greene (GBR); Europe	47.88; PB	Javier Culson (PUR); Americas	48.08	Bershawn Jackson (USA); Americas	48.62
3000 metre steeplechase	Richard Mateelong (KEN); Africa	8:09.67; CR	Roba Gari (ETH); Africa	8:09.87; NR	Mahiedine Mekhissi-Benabbad (FRA); Europe	8:09.96
4 × 100 metre relay	Americas; Daniel Bailey (ATG); Wallace Spearmon (USA); Tyson Gay (USA); Churandy Martina (AHO)	38.25	Asia-Pacific; Shinji Takahira (JPN); Naoki Tsukahara (JPN); Kenji Fujimitsu (JPN); Shintaro Kimura (JPN)	39.28	Africa; Hannes Dreyer (RSA); Simon Magakwe (RSA); Wilhelm van der Vyver (RSA); Thuso Mpuang (RSA)	39.82
4 × 400 metre relay	Americas; Nery Brenes (CRC); Bershawn Jackson (USA); Greg Nixon (USA); Ricardo Chambers (JAM)	2:59.00; CR	Europe; Michael Bingham (GBR); Kevin Borlée (BEL); Vladimir Krasnov (RUS); Martyn Rooney (GBR)	2:59.84	Africa; Gary Kikaya (COD); Mark Kiprotich Mutai (KEN); Mohamed Khouaja (LBA); Rabah Yousif (SUD)	3:02.62
High jump	Rashid Ahmed Al-Mannai (QAT); Asia-Pacific	2.28; PB	Donald Thomas (BAH); Americas	2.28	Martyn Bernard (GBR); Europe	2.25
Pole vault	Steven Hooker (AUS); Asia-Pacific	5.95; CR	Renaud Lavillenie (FRA); Europe	5.90	Derek Miles (USA); Americas	5.75
Long jump	Dwight Phillips (USA); Americas	8.34	Kafétien Gomis (FRA); Europe	8.10	Christian Reif (GER); Europe	7.99
Triple jump	Marian Oprea (ROU); Europe	17.29	Alexis Copello (CUB); Americas	17.25	Phillips Idowu (GBR); Europe	17.24
Shot put	Christian Cantwell (USA); Americas	21.87	Tomasz Majewski (POL); Europe	21.22	Scott Martin (AUS); Asia-Pacific	20.10^{1}
Discus throw	Robert Harting (GER); Europe	66.85	Benn Harradine (AUS); Asia-Pacific	66.45; AR	Ehsan Haddadi (IRI); Asia-Pacific	64.55
Hammer throw	Libor Charfreitag (SVK); Europe	79.69	Dilshod Nazarov (TJK); Asia-Pacific	78.76	Ali Al-Zinkawi (KUW); Asia-Pacific	76.73
Javelin throw	Andreas Thorkildsen (NOR); Europe	89.26; CR	Gerhardus Pienaar (RSA); Africa	83.17; SB	Matthias de Zordo (GER); Europe	82.89

^{1} Andrei Mikhnevich (BLR) of Europe originally won the bronze medal with 20.68m, but he was disqualified in 2012 after a retest of his samples from the 2005 World Championships tested positive for clenbuterol, methandienone and oxandrolone.

=== Women ===
Event	Gold		Silver		Bronze	
100 metres	Kelly-Ann Baptiste (TRI); Americas	11.05	Shalonda Solomon (USA); Americas	11.09	Blessing Okagbare (NGR); Africa	11.14
200 metres	Aleksandra Fedoriva (RUS); Europe	22.86	Yelizaveta Bryzhina (UKR); Europe	23.37	Cydonie Mothersille (CAY); Americas	23.41
400 metres	Amantle Montsho (BOT); Africa	49.89; SB	Debbie Dunn (USA); Americas	50.21	Tatyana Firova (RUS); Europe	50.45
800 metres	Janeth Jepkosgei (KEN); Africa	1:57.88	Kenia Sinclair (JAM); Americas	1:58.16; SB	Mariya Savinova (RUS); Europe	1:58.27
1500 metres	Hind Déhiba Chahyd (FRA); Europe	4:19.78	Nicole Edwards (CAN); Americas	4:21.34	Christin Wurth-Thomas (USA); Americas	4:21.46
3000 metres	Meseret Defar (ETH); Africa	9:03.33	Shannon Rowbury (USA); Americas	9:04.82	Malindi Elmore (CAN); Americas	9:04.82
5000 metres	Vivian Cheruiyot (KEN); Africa	16:05.74	Sentayehu Ejigu (ETH); Africa	16:07.11	Molly Huddle (USA); Americas	16:08.60
100 metre hurdles	Sally Pearson (AUS); Asia-Pacific	12.65	Lolo Jones (USA); Americas	12.66	Perdita Felicien (CAN); Americas	12.68
400 metre hurdles	Nickiesha Wilson (JAM); Americas	54.52; SB	Muizat Ajoke Odumosu (NGR); Africa	54.59; NR	Vania Stambolova (BUL); Europe	54.89
3000 metre steeplechase	Yuliya Zarudneva (RUS); Europe	9:25.46; CR	Milcah Chemos Cheywa (KEN); Africa	9:25.84	Sofia Assefa (ETH); Africa	9:29.53
4 × 100 metre relay	Americas; Cydonie Mothersille (CYM); Debbie Ferguson-McKenzie (BAH); Shalonda Solomon (USA); Kelly-Ann Baptiste (TRI)	43.07	Europe; Olesya Povh (UKR); Nataliya Pohrebnyak (UKR); Mariya Ryemyen (UKR); Yelizaveta Bryzhina (UKR)	43.77	Africa; Ruddy Zang Milama (GAB); Agnes Osazuwa (NGR); Oludamola Osayomi (NGR); Blessing Okagbare (NGR)	43.88
4 × 400 metre relay	Americas; Shericka Williams (JAM); Debbie Dunn (USA); Nickiesha Wilson (JAM); Christine Amertil (BAH)	3:26.37	Europe; Kseniya Ustalova (RUS); Antonina Krivoshapka (RUS); Libania Grenot (ITA); Tatyana Firova (RUS)	3:26.58	Africa; Folashade Abugan (NGR); Amy Mbacké Thiam (SEN); Ndeye Soumah (SEN); Amantle Montsho (BWA)	3:27.99
High jump	Blanka Vlašić (CRO); Europe	2.05; CR, =WL	Emma Green (SWE); Europe	1.95	Levern Spencer (LCA); Americas; Nadiya Dusanova (UZB); Asia-Pacific	1.88
Pole vault	Svetlana Feofanova (RUS); Europe	4.70; CR	Lisa Ryzih (GER); Europe	4.60	Fabiana Murer (BRA); Americas	4.50
Long jump	Yuliya Tarasova (UZB); Asia-Pacific	6.70	Yargelis Savigne (CUB); Americas	6.63	Olga Rypakova (KAZ); Asia-Pacific	6.60; SB
Triple jump	Olga Rypakova (KAZ); Asia-Pacific	15.25; CR, AR	Olha Saladukha (UKR); Europe	14.70	Yargelis Savigne (CUB); Americas	14.63
Shot put	Valerie Adams (NZL); Asia-Pacific	20.86; SB	Nadzeya Astapchuk (BLR); Europe	20.18	Gong Lijiao (CHN); Asia-Pacific	20.13; SB
Discus throw	Li Yanfeng (CHN); Asia-Pacific	63.79	Sandra Perković (CRO); Europe	63.29	Yarelis Barrios (CUB); Americas	62.58
Hammer throw	Tatyana Lysenko (RUS); Europe	73.88	Zhang Wenxiu (CHN); Asia-Pacific	73.69	Yipsi Moreno (CUB); Americas	72.73
Javelin throw	Sunette Viljoen (RSA); Africa	62.21 ^{1}	Kimberley Mickle (AUS); Asia-Pacific	61.36; SB	Linda Stahl (GER); Europe	60.37

^{1} Mariya Abakumova (RUS) of Europe originally won the gold medal with 68.14, but she was disqualified in 2018 after her results from 2008 to 2016 were deleted after a retest of her samples from the 2012 Olympics were positive for dehydrochlormethyltestosterone (oral turanibol).

== Score Table ==
Event		Africa		Americas		Asia-Pacific		Europe	
100 metres	M	4	0	7	5	3	2	8	6
100 metres	W	6	2	8	7	3	1	5	4
200 metres	M	6	3	8	7	4	2	5	0
200 metres	W	4	2	6	5	3	1	8	7
400 metres	M	4	1	8	7	3	2	6	5
400 metres	W	8	4	7	5	2	1	6	3
800 metres	M	8	2	5	4	6	1	7	3
800 metres	W	8	3	7	1	4	2	6	5
1500 metres	M	8	7	6	3	2	1	5	4
1500 metres	W	2	1	7	6	5	3	8	4
3000 metres	M	7	5	8	6	4	2	3	1
3000 metres	W	8	5	7	6	4	2	0	3
5000 metres	M	7	5	8	2	4	0	6	3
5000 metres	W	8	7	6	2	4	0	5	3
3000 metre steeplechase	M	8	7	2	1	4	3	6	5
3000 metre steeplechase	W	7	6	5	4	2	1	8	3
110/100 metre hurdles	M	4	3	8	1	6	2	7	5
110/100 metre hurdles	W	3	2	7	6	8	1	5	4
400 metre hurdles	M	5	4	7	6	2	1	8	3
400 metre hurdles	W	7	2	8	3	4	0	6	5
4 × 100 metres relay	M	7		15		11		0	
4 × 100 metres relay	W	7		15		3		11	
4 × 400 metres relay	M	7		15		3		11	
4 × 400 metres relay	W	7		15		3		11	
Track Points	M	112		139		68		107	
Track Points	W	109		143		57		120	
High jump	M	5	0	7	3	8	4	6	2
High jump	W	2	1	5.5	3	5.5	4	8	7
Pole vault	M	2	0	6	3	8	4	7	5
Pole vault	W	2	0	6	4	5	3	8	7
Long jump	M	3	1	8	4	5	2	7	6
Long jump	W	3	1	7	2	8	6	5	4
Triple jump	M	5	3	7	4	2	1	8	6
Triple jump	W	3	2	6	1	8	5	7	4
Shot put	M	4	2	8	5	6	3	7	0
Shot put	W	2	1	5	4	8	6	7	3
Discus throw	M	2	1	4	3	7	6	8	5
Discus throw	W	2	1	6	4	8	5	7	3
Hammer throw	M	2	1	4	3	7	6	8	5
Hammer throw	W	2	0	6	4	7	3	8	5
Javelin throw	M	7	3	2	1	5	4	8	6
Javelin throw	W	8	5	4	3	7	0	0	6
Field Points	M	39		71		78		100	
Field Points	W	33		68.5		87.5		96	
Total Points	M	151		210		146		207	
Total Points	W	144		214.5		145.5		203	
Event		Africa		Americas		Asia-Pacific		Europe	
Event		295		424.5		292.5		410	
