= Athletics at the 2015 Summer Universiade – Men's 400 metres =

The men's 400 metres event at the 2015 Summer Universiade was held on 8, 9 and 10 July at the Gwangju Universiade Main Stadium.

== Medalists ==
Gold	Silver	Bronze
Luguelín Santos; Dominican Republic	Leaname Maotoanong; Botswana	Jan Tesař; Czech Republic

== Results ==
=== Heats ===
Qualification: First 2 in each heat (Q) and next 6 fastest (q) qualified for the semifinals.

Rank	Heat	Name	Nationality	Time	Notes
1	3	Gustavo Cuesta	Dominican Republic	46.45	Q
2	6	Leaname Maotoanong	Botswana	46.57	Q
3	2	Luguelín Santos	Dominican Republic	46.77	Q
4	6	Pieter Conradie	South Africa	46.92	Q
4	9	Sakaria Kamberuka	Botswana	46.92	Q
6	2	George Effah	Ghana	46.96	Q, PB
7	7	Jan Tesař	Czech Republic	47.03	Q
8	5	Park Bong-go	South Korea	47.20	Q
9	8	Nick Ekelund-Arenander	Denmark	47.21	Q
10	2	Sergio Germain	Chile	47.30	q
11	7	Fitzroy Dunkley	Jamaica	47.32	Q
12	4	Takamasa Kitagawa	Japan	47.34	Q
13	3	Rafał Omelko	Poland	47.41	Q
14	5	Kentaro Sato	Japan	47.49	Q
15	3	Zoltán Kovács	Hungary	47.59	q, SB
16	4	Kim Ui-yeon	South Korea	47.76	Q, SB
17	6	Axel Bergrahm	Sweden	47.80	q
18	1	Roberto Severi	Italy	47.87	Q
19	7	Bailey Stewart	New Zealand	47.88	q
20	8	Jon Seeliger	South Africa	47.89	Q
21	9	Cole Lambourne	United States	47.90	Q
22	1	Alexander Beck	Australia	47.93	Q
23	9	Mauritz Kåshagen	Norway	48.00	q
24	7	Andrea Delfino	Italy	48.02	q
25	5	Mateusz Zagórski	Poland	48.18	
26	1	Charles Shimukowa	Zambia	48.23	PB
27	4	Adrian Dragan	Romania	48.49	
28	1	Andrey Sokolov	Kazakhstan	48.50	
29	9	Aitzhan Baisbayev	Kazakhstan	48.59	
30	8	Ibrahima Mbengue	Senegal	48.64	
31	6	Leung King Hung	Hong Kong	48.74	
32	8	Mohamad Bin Alet	Malaysia	48.78	
33	6	Ousmane Sidibé	Senegal	48.84	
34	5	Richard Ongom	Uganda	48.91	
35	1	Kunanon Sukkaew	Thailand	49.08	
35	7	Du Shen	China	49.08	
37	5	Rauno Kunnapuu	Estonia	49.11	
38	2	Daniel Bingi	Uganda	49.21	
39	6	Philip Braun	Denmark	49.29	PB
40	8	Denis Koren	Slovenia	49.30	SB
41	5	Usama Al-Gheilani	Oman	49.37	PB
42	3	Wijesundara Mudiyanselage	Sri Lanka	49.37	SB
43	8	Xu Rihong	China	50.11	
44	7	Talent Gomba	Zimbabwe	50.32	
45	3	Lalit Mathur	India	50.63	
46	5	Batnasan Batsukh	Mongolia	50.98	
47	8	Jocksan Morales	Costa Rica	51.22	
48	9	Kyle Stanley	Trinidad and Tobago	51.75	
49	2	Aghiles Saichi	Algeria	51.97	
50	2	Andrew Morgan	Panama	52.09	
50	6	Jantsandorj Ganbold	Mongolia	52.09	
52	7	Donald Arias	Costa Rica	52.12	
53	3	Daniel Saliba	Malta	53.59	
54	4	Montano Abeso	Equatorial Guinea	58.90	
	1	Ali Al-Achkar	Lebanon	DNF	
	2	Aleksey Kenig	Russia	DNF	
	9	Robert Annak	Ghana	DQ	R163.3
	4	Bilal Sa'Ada	Jordan	DQ	R163.3
	3	Omeiza Akerele	Equatorial Guinea	DNS	
	4	Chernor Barrie	Sierra Leone	DNS	
	4	Abiola Onakoya	Nigeria	DNS	

=== Semifinals ===
Qualification: First 2 in each heat (Q) and the next 2 fastest (q) qualified for the final.

Rank	Heat	Name	Nationality	Time	Notes
1	1	Leaname Maotoanong	Botswana	45.77	Q
2	1	Jan Tesař	Czech Republic	45.98	Q, PB
3	2	Luguelín Santos	Dominican Republic	46.01	Q
3	3	Nick Ekelund-Arenander	Denmark	46.01	Q, SB
5	3	Alexander Beck	Australia	46.05	Q, PB
6	3	Gustavo Cuesta	Dominican Republic	46.10	q
7	2	Sakaria Kamberuka	Botswana	46.14	Q
8	1	Takamasa Kitagawa	Japan	46.25	q
9	1	Jon Seeliger	South Africa	46.31	
10	2	Kentaro Sato	Japan	46.36	
11	3	Park Bong-go	South Korea	46.39	SB
12	1	Cole Lambourne	United States	46.58	
13	3	Rafał Omelko	Poland	46.62	
14	1	George Effah	Ghana	46.67	PB
15	2	Pieter Conradie	South Africa	46.84	
16	1	Zoltán Kovács	Hungary	47.10	SB
17	2	Kim Ui-yeon	South Korea	47.15	SB
18	2	Axel Bergrahm	Sweden	47.42	
19	3	Sergio Germain	Chile	47.46	
20	2	Bailey Stewart	New Zealand	47.57	
21	3	Andrea Delfino	Italy	47.72	PB
22	2	Roberto Severi	Italy	47.79	
23	1	Mauritz Kåshagen	Norway	48.34	
	3	Fitzroy Dunkley	Jamaica	DNS	

=== Final ===
Rank	Lane	Name	Nationality	Time	Notes
1st place, gold medalist(s)	5	Luguelín Santos	Dominican Republic	44.91	SB
2nd place, silver medalist(s)	3	Leaname Maotoanong	Botswana	45.63	PB
3rd place, bronze medalist(s)	4	Jan Tesař	Czech Republic	45.73	PB
4	1	Gustavo Cuesta	Dominican Republic	45.78	
5	8	Sakaria Kamberuka	Botswana	45.83	SB
6	7	Alexander Beck	Australia	45.91	PB
7	2	Takamasa Kitagawa	Japan	46.03	
8	6	Nick Ekelund-Arenander	Denmark	46.53	
