= Takamasa Kitagawa =

Japanese sprinter (born 1996)

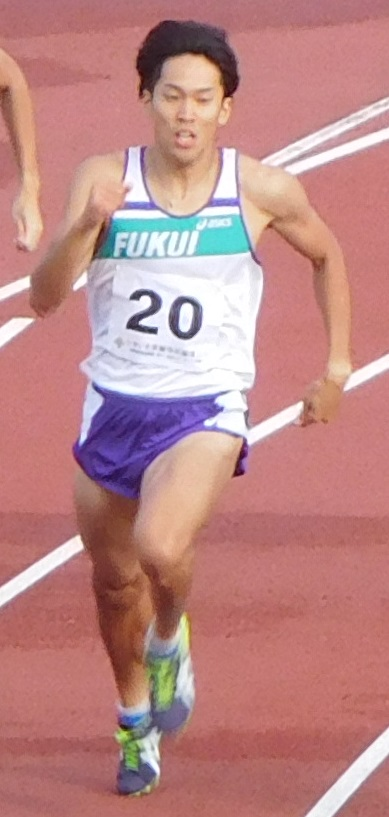

Personal information
- Born: 5 September 1996 (age 29)
- Education: Juntendo University
- Height: 1.77 m (5 ft 10 in)
- Weight: 70 kg (150 lb)

Sport
- Sport: Track and field
- Event: 400 metres

Takamasa Kitagawa (北川 貴理, Kitagawa Takamasa; born 5 September 1996) is a Japanese sprinter specialising in the 400 metres. He has won several medals with the Japanese 4 × 400 metres relay team.

His personal best in the 400 metres is 45.52 seconds set in Niigata in 2015.

== Competition record ==
Year	Competition	Venue	Position	Event	Notes
Representing Japan
2014	World Junior Championships	Eugene, United States	2nd	4 × 400 m relay	3:04.11
2014	Continental Cup	Marrakesh, Morocco	4th	4 × 400 m relay	3:03.77
2015	IAAF World Relays	Nassau, Bahamas	17th (h)	4 × 400 m relay	3:06.38
2015	Asian Championships	Wuhan, China	5th	400 m	46.33
2015	Asian Championships	Wuhan, China	3rd	4 × 400 m relay	3:03.47
2015	Universiade	Gwangju, South Korea	7th	400 m	46.03
2015	Universiade	Gwangju, South Korea	2nd	4 × 400 m relay	3:07.75
2015	World Championships	Beijing, China	15th (h)	4 × 400 m relay	3:02.97
2016	Olympic Games	Rio de Janeiro, Brazil	13th (h)	4 × 400 m relay	3:02.95
2017	World Championships	London, United Kingdom	45th (h)	400 m	47.35
2017	Universiade	Taipei, Taiwan	22nd (sf)	400 m	47.85
