= Athletics at the 2014 Commonwealth Games – Men's 400 metres =

Men's 400 metres at the Commonwealth Games

The Men's 400 metres at the 2014 Commonwealth Games, as part of the athletics programme, was held at Hampden Park between 28 and 30 July 2014. The event was won by pre-event favourite and Olympic champion Kirani James in a new Commonwealth Games record. Wayde van Niekerk from South Africa came second and Lalonde Gordon of Trinidad and Tobago got the bronze medal.

== Results ==
=== First round ===
==== Heat 1 ====
Rank	Lane	Name	Reaction	Result	Notes	Qual.
1	4	Jarrin Solomon (TRI)	0.169	45.69		Q
2	7	Winston George (GUY)	0.230	46.25		Q
3	6	Akheem Gauntlett (JAM)	0.178	46.31		Q
4	8	Nigel Levine (ENG)	0.168	46.35		q
5	5	Erison Hurtault (DMA)	0.171	47.02		
6	2	Angelo Garland (TCI)	0.190	48.86		
7	1	Heamatangi Tuivai (TON)	0.221	49.54		
8	3	Hussain Inaas (MDV)	0.213	50.02	SB	

==== Heat 2 ====
Rank	Lane	Name	Reaction	Result	Notes	Qual.
1	4	Renny Quow (TRI)	0.180	45.86		Q
2	6	Steven Solomon (AUS)	0.175	46.26		Q
3	2	Wayde van Niekerk (RSA)	0.168	46.87		Q
4	1	Salihu Isah (NGR)	0.149	47.51		
5	3	Kwadwo Acheampong (GHA)	0.154	47.72		
6	5	Rosen Daniel (LCA)	0.171	47.97		
7	7	Theo Piniau (PNG)	0.117	48.50		

==== Heat 3 ====
Rank	Lane	Name	Reaction	Result	Notes	Qual.
1		Kirani James (GRN)	0.173	45.52		Q
2		Michael Bingham (ENG)	0.153	45.80		Q
3		Rusheen McDonald (JAM)	0.180	46.14		Q
4		Mike Robertson (CAN)	0.182	46.87		q
5		Nelson Stone (PNG)	0.171	47.60		
6		Brandon Valentine-Parris (SVG)	0.176	50.90		
		Noah Akwu (NGR)	0.187	DQ		

==== Heat 4 ====
Rank	Lane	Name	Reaction	Result	Notes	Qual.
1	8	LaToy Williams (BAH)	0.197	46.07		Q
2	7	Daundre Barnaby (CAN)	0.174	46.16		Q
3	2	Emmanuel Tugumisirize (UGA)	0.204	46.73		
4	4	Mark Mutai (KEN)	0.175	47.60		
5	5	Golden Gunde (MAW)	0.218	47.85		
6	1	Akeame Mussington (ANG)	0.201	51.50		
	6	John O'Brien (GHA)	0.163		DNF	
	3	Robert Simmons (NGR)	0.142		DNF	

==== Heat 5 ====
Rank	Lane	Name	Reaction	Result	Notes	Qual.
1	3	Chris Brown (BAH)	0.168	46.30		Q
2	5	Stephan James (GUY)	0.171	46.39		Q
3	7	Pako Seribe (BOT)	0.151	46.64		Q
4	2	Lestrod Roland (SKN)	0.170	47.17		
5	4	Talberc Poleon (LCA)	0.191	47.32		
6	1	Siologa Viliamu Sepa (SAM)	0.202	49.24		
	6	Boniface Mucheru (KEN)			DNS	

==== Heat 6 ====
Rank	Lane	Name	Reaction	Result	Notes	Qual.
1	7	Isaac Makwala (BOT)	0.187	45.33		Q
2	1	Bralon Taplin (GRN)	0.205	45.90		Q
3	3	Philip Osei (CAN)	0.184	47.11		Q
4	2	Tom Druce (GUE)	0.156	49.62		
	5	Solomon odongo Buoga (KEN)	0.226		DQ	
	6	Hugh Graham Jr. (JAM)	0.212		DQ	
	4	Alli Ngaimoko (UGA)			DNS	

==== Heat 7 ====
Rank	Lane	Name	Reaction	Result	Notes	Qual.
1	6	Martyn Rooney (ENG)	0.194	45.57		Q
2	1	Lalonde Gordon (TRI)	0.184	45.84		Q
3	8	Saviour Kombe (ZAM)	0.171	46.41		Q
4	7	Mitchel Davis (DMA)	0.177	46.94	=PB	q
5	4	Daniel Gyasi (GHA)	0.189	47.07		
6	3	Payton Hazzard (GRN)	0.198	47.33		
7	2	Kaminiel Matlaun (PNG)	0.162	48.65		
8	5	Imani james Rusanganya (TAN)	0.210	50.87		

=== Semi-finals ===
==== Semi-final 1 ====
Rank	Lane	Name	Reaction	Result	Notes	Qual.
1	5	Martyn Rooney (ENG)	0.190	45.22		Q
2	6	Jarrin Solomon (TRI)	0.168	45.49		Q
3	3	Chris Brown (BAH)	0.152	45.55		q
4	8	Rusheen McDonald (JAM)	0.188	45.95		
5	4	Bralon Taplin (GRN)	0.168	46.68		
6	2	Philip Osei (CAN)	0.185	47.16		
7	7	Pako Seribe (BOT)	0.196	47.43		
8	1	Mitchel Davis (DMA)	0.171	47.49		

==== Semi-final 2 ====
Rank	Lane	Name	Reaction	Result	Notes	Qual.
1	4	Kirani James (GRN)	0.156	45.14		Q
2	2	Wayde van Niekerk (RSA)	0.173	45.41		Q
3	6	Renny Quow (TRI)	0.195	45.47		q
4	5	Michael Bingham (ENG)	0.155	45.71		
5	7	Akheem Gauntlett (JAM)	0.175	46.16		
6	3	Daundre Barnaby (CAN)	0.168	46.28		
7	8	Stephan James (GUY)	0.174	46.35		
8	1	Emmanuel Tugumisirize (UGA)	0.187	46.57		

==== Semi-final 3 ====
Rank	Lane	Name	Reaction	Result	Notes	Qual.
1	5	Lalonde Gordon (TRI)	0.183	45.37		Q
2	4	LaToy Williams (BAH)	0.175	45.44		Q
3	3	Isaac Makwala (BOT)	0.191	45.57		
4	6	Winston George (GUY)	0.254	46.38		
5	2	Nigel Levine (ENG)	0.151	46.57		
6	1	Mike Robertson (CAN)	0.156	47.30		
7	8	Saviour Kombe (ZAM)	0.181	47.70		
	7	Steven Solomon (AUS)	0.137		DNF	

=== Final ===
Rank	Lane	Name	Reaction	Result	Notes
1st place, gold medalist(s)	6	Kirani James (GRN)	0.154	44.24	GR
2nd place, silver medalist(s)	4	Wayde van Niekerk (RSA)	0.168	44.68	
3rd place, bronze medalist(s)	3	Lalonde Gordon (TRI)	0.183	44.78	SB
4	5	Martyn Rooney (ENG)	0.156	45.15	
5	8	LaToy Williams (BAH)	0.174	45.63	
6	7	Jarrin Solomon (TRI)	0.145	45.82	
	2	Renny Quow (TRI)	0.182		DNF
	1	Chris Brown (BAH)			DNS
