= 2014 African Championships in Athletics – Men's 400 metres =

The men's 400 metres event at the 2014 African Championships in Athletics was held August 10–12 on Stade de Marrakech.

== Medalists ==
Gold	Silver	Bronze
Isaac Makwala; Botswana	Wayde van Niekerk; South Africa	Boniface Mucheru; Kenya

== Results ==
=== Heats ===
Qualification: First 3 of each heat (Q) and the next 4 fastest (q) qualified for the semifinals.

Rank	Heat	Name	Nationality	Time	Notes
1	4	Isaac Makwala	Botswana	45.87	Q
2	4	Savior Kombe	Zambia	46.07	Q
3	3	Pako Seribe	Botswana	46.12	Q
4	3	Boniface Mucheru	Kenya	46.58	Q
5	1	Wayde van Niekerk	South Africa	46.78	Q
5	2	Onkabetse Nkobolo	Botswana	46.78	Q
7	1	Gyles Afoumba	Republic of the Congo	46.80	Q
8	1	Kenenisa Hailu	Ethiopia	46.82	Q
9	2	Noah Akwu	Nigeria	46.88	Q
10	2	Haji Turie	Ethiopia	46.90	Q
11	2	Mark Mutai	Kenya	46.93	q
12	4	Younés Belkaifa	Morocco	46.96	Q
13	3	Mohamed Khwaja	Libya	46.98	Q
14	4	Daniel Gyasi	Ghana	47.07	q
15	1	Kwadwo Acheampong	Ghana	47.08	q
15	4	Denis Opio	Uganda	47.08	q
17	3	Isah Salihu	Nigeria	47.12	
18	3	Emmanuel Mwewa	Zambia	47.26	
19	2	Diakalia Bamba	Mali	47.31	
20	1	Solomon Buoga	Kenya	47.41	
21	4	Abdulsalam Abutorkia	Libya	48.07	
22	3	Gebra Galcha	Ethiopia	48.24	
23	1	Cephas Nyimbili	Zambia	48.67	
24	3	Mustapha Ghizlane	Morocco	49.51	
25	3	Yonas Amanuel	Eritrea	51.49	
26	2	Alseny Conde	Guinea	51.76	
	1	Robert Simmons	Nigeria	DQ	R162.6
	4	Rodwell Leroy Ndhlovu	Zimbabwe	DNS	

=== Semifinals ===
Qualification: First 3 of each semifinal (Q) and the next 2 fastest (q) qualified for the final.

Rank	Heat	Name	Nationality	Time	Notes
1	2	Isaac Makwala	Botswana	45.58	Q
2	1	Pako Seribe	Botswana	45.62	Q
3	2	Savior Kombe	Zambia	45.74	Q
4	2	Noah Akwu	Nigeria	45.86	Q
5	2	Mohamed Khwaja	Libya	46.28	q
6	1	Boniface Mucheru	Kenya	46.38	Q
7	1	Daniel Gyasi	Ghana	46.65	Q
8	2	Wayde van Niekerk	South Africa	46.67	q
9	2	Mark Mutai	Kenya	46.77	
10	1	Haji Turie	Ethiopia	46.90	
11	1	Younés Belkaifa	Morocco	47.07	
12	1	Gyles Afoumba	Republic of the Congo	47.09	
13	2	Kwadwo Acheampong	Ghana	47.86	
14	2	Kenenisa Hailu	Ethiopia	48.79	
	1	Onkabetse Nkobolo	Botswana	DNF	
	1	Denis Opio	Uganda	DNS	

=== Final ===
Rank	Lane	Name	Nationality	Time	Notes
1st place, gold medalist(s)	4	Isaac Makwala	Botswana	44.23	CR
2nd place, silver medalist(s)	2	Wayde van Niekerk	South Africa	45.00	
3rd place, bronze medalist(s)	3	Boniface Mucheru	Kenya	45.07	
4	5	Savior Kombe	Zambia	45.27	
5	1	Mohamed Khwaja	Libya	45.40	
6	6	Pako Seribe	Botswana	45.50	
7	7	Noah Akwu	Nigeria	46.40	
8	8	Daniel Gyasi	Ghana	46.94	
