= Isah Salihu =

Nigerian sprinter

Personal information
- Born: 2 November 1991 (age 34) Bida, Nigeria
- Height: 1.79 m (5 ft 10 in)
- Weight: 81 kg (179 lb)

Sport
- Sport: Track and field
- Event: 400 metres
Medal record
Men's athletics
Representing Nigeria
African Championships
| Gold medal – first place | 2012 Porto-Novo | 4×400 m |
| Bronze medal – third place | 2010 Nairobi | 4×400 m |
| Bronze medal – third place | 2018 Asaba | 4×400 m |

Isah Salihu (born 2 November 1991) is a Nigerian sprinter specialising in the 400 metres. He represented his country in the 4 × 400 metres relay at one outdoor and two indoor World Championships. His personal best in the event is 46.15 seconds set in Calabar in 2014.

== Competition record ==
| Year | Competition | Venue | Position | Event | Notes |
Representing Nigeria
| 2010 | World Junior Championships | Moncton, Canada | 9th (sf) | 400 m | 47.09 |
| 2010 | World Junior Championships | Moncton, Canada | 4th (h) | 4 × 100 m relay | 39.95^{1} |
| 2010 | World Junior Championships | Moncton, Canada | 2nd | 4 × 400 m relay | 3:06.36 |
| 2010 | African Championships | Nairobi, Kenya | 3rd | 4 × 400 m relay | 3:06.53 |
| 2012 | African Championships | Porto-Novo, Benin | 8th | 400 m | 46.98 |
| 2012 | African Championships | Porto-Novo, Benin | 1st | 4 × 400 m relay | 3:02.39 |
| 2013 | World Championships | Moscow, Russia | 18th (h) | 4 × 400 m relay | 3:04.52 |
| 2014 | World Indoor Championships | Sopot, Poland | 7th (h) | 4 × 400 m relay | 3:07.95 |
| 2014 | IAAF World Relays | Nassau, Bahamas | – | 4 × 200 m relay | DNF |
| 2014 | IAAF World Relays | Nassau, Bahamas | 4th (B) | 4 × 400 m relay | 3:04.49 |
| 2014 | Commonwealth Games | Glasgow, United Kingdom | 30th (h) | 400 m | 47.51 |
| 2014 | Commonwealth Games | Glasgow, United Kingdom | 7th | 4 × 400 m relay | 3:04.86 |
| 2014 | African Championships | Marrakesh, Morocco | 30th (h) | 400 m | 47.51 |
| 2016 | World Indoor Championships | Portland, United States | 6th (h) | 4 × 400 m relay | 3:07.98 |
| 2018 | Commonwealth Games | Gold Coast, Australia | – | 4 × 400 m relay | DQ |

^{1}Disqualified in the final
