= 2010 World Junior Championships in Athletics – Men's 400 metres =

The men's 400 metres event at the 2010 World Junior Championships in Athletics was held in Moncton, New Brunswick, Canada, at Moncton Stadium on 20, 21 and 22 July.

== Medalists ==
Gold	Kirani James; Grenada
Silver	Marcell Deák Nagy; Hungary
Bronze	Errol Nolan; United States

== Results ==
=== Final ===
22 July

Rank	Name	Nationality	Time	Notes
1st place, gold medalist(s)	Kirani James	Grenada	45.89	
2nd place, silver medalist(s)	Marcell Deák Nagy	Hungary	46.09	
3rd place, bronze medalist(s)	Errol Nolan	United States	46.36	
4	Marco Kaiser	Germany	46.79	
5	Josh Mance	United States	46.84	
6	Luguelín Santos	Dominican Republic	46.90	
7	Alistair Moona	Canada	47.38	
8	Pako Seribe	Botswana	48.07	

=== Semifinals ===
21 July

==== Semifinal 1 ====
Rank	Name	Nationality	Time	Notes
1	Marcell Deák Nagy	Hungary	46.23	Q
2	Errol Nolan	United States	46.47	Q
3	Pako Seribe	Botswana	47.02	q
4	Omar Longart	Venezuela	47.25	
5	Tobi Ogunmola	Nigeria	47.43	
6	Jacques de Swardt	South Africa	47.98	
7	Jonathan Vilaine	France	48.08	
8	Awad El-Karim Makki	Sudan	48.55	

==== Semifinal 2 ====
Rank	Name	Nationality	Time	Notes
1	Kirani James	Grenada	46.27	Q
2	Marco Kaiser	Germany	46.40	Q
3	Luguelín Santos	Dominican Republic	46.54	q
4	Isah Salihu	Nigeria	47.09	
5	Shaun De Jager	South Africa	47.47	
6	Halit Kiliç	Turkey	47.61	
7	Mohamed Abou El-Khair	Egypt	48.31	
	Park Bong-Go	South Korea	DQ	IAAF rule 163.3

==== Semifinal 3 ====
Rank	Name	Nationality	Time	Notes
1	Josh Mance	United States	46.43	Q
2	Alistair Moona	Canada	46.83	Q
3	Mateusz Fórmanski	Poland	47.09	
4	Thapelo Ketlogetswe	Botswana	47.23	
5	Deon Lendore	Trinidad and Tobago	47.49	
6	Alex Jordan	New Zealand	47.65	
7	Philipp Kleemann	Germany	47.86	
8	Demar Murray	Jamaica	48.01	

=== Heats ===
20 July

==== Heat 1 ====
Rank	Name	Nationality	Time	Notes
1	Mateusz Fórmanski	Poland	46.75	Q
2	Omar Longart	Venezuela	47.38	Q
3	Alex Jordan	New Zealand	47.50	Q
4	Jacques de Swardt	South Africa	47.50	q
5	Demar Murray	Jamaica	47.62	q
6	Philipp Kleemann	Germany	47.90	q
7	Ratutira Narara	Fiji	48.97	
	Mitchel Davis	Dominica	DQ	IAAF rule 163.3

==== Heat 2 ====
Rank	Name	Nationality	Time	Notes
1	Marco Kaiser	Germany	47.06	Q
2	Pako Seribe	Botswana	47.16	Q
3	Park Bong-Go	South Korea	47.46	Q
4	Mohamed Abou El-Khair	Egypt	47.70	q
5	Mehmet Güzel	Turkey	48.07	
6	Jermaine Gayle	Jamaica	48.10	
7	Golden Gunde	Malawi	48.68	
8	Mahamoud Athoumani	Comoros	50.48	

==== Heat 3 ====
Rank	Name	Nationality	Time	Notes
1	Marcell Deák Nagy	Hungary	47.31	Q
2	Luguelín Santos	Dominican Republic	47.36	Q
3	Awad El-Karim Makki	Sudan	47.59	Q
4	Lim Chan-Ho	South Korea	47.97	
5	Uroš Jovanovic	Slovenia	48.02	
6	Jocelyn Muntaner	French Polynesia	50.18	
7	Michael Rasmijn	Aruba	51.65	

==== Heat 4 ====
Rank	Name	Nationality	Time	Notes
1	Josh Mance	United States	47.29	Q
2	Thapelo Ketlogetswe	Botswana	47.46	Q
3	Shaun De Jager	South Africa	47.48	Q
4	Keitaro Sato	Japan	47.92	
5	Tremaine Harris	Canada	48.34	
6	Boniface Mucheru Tumuti	Kenya	48.85	
7	Momodou Kujabi	Gambia	49.84	

==== Heat 5 ====
Rank	Name	Nationality	Time	Notes
1	Kirani James	Grenada	47.12	Q
2	Halit Kiliç	Turkey	47.28	Q
3	Deon Lendore	Trinidad and Tobago	47.33	Q
4	Isah Salihu	Nigeria	47.75	q
5	Junki Yanagisawa	Japan	48.99	
6	Mohamed Al-Jumaah	Iraq	49.81	
7	Stephen Newbold	Bahamas	50.62	

==== Heat 6 ====
Rank	Name	Nationality	Time	Notes
1	Errol Nolan	United States	46.67	Q
2	Alistair Moona	Canada	47.22	Q
3	Tobi Ogunmola	Nigeria	47.28	Q
4	Jonathan Vilaine	France	47.54	q
5	Kishon Dempster	Trinidad and Tobago	48.54	
6	Scott Burch	New Zealand	48.63	
	Benjamin Auka Nyasimi	Kenya	DQ	IAAF rule 163.3

== Participation ==
According to an unofficial count, 44 athletes from 31 countries participated in the event.

- Aruba (1)
- Bahamas (1)
- Botswana (2)
- Canada (2)
- Comoros (1)
- Dominica (1)
- Dominican Republic (1)
- Egypt (1)
- Fiji (1)
- France (1)
- French Polynesia (1)
- Gambia (1)
- Germany (2)
- Grenada (1)
- Hungary (1)
- Iraq (1)
- Jamaica (2)
- Japan (2)
- Kenya (2)
- Malawi (1)
- New Zealand (2)
- Nigeria (2)
- Poland (1)
- Slovenia (1)
- South Africa (2)
- South Korea (2)
- Sudan (1)
- Trinidad and Tobago (2)
- Turkey (2)
- United States (2)
- Venezuela (1)
