= Athletics at the 2015 Summer Universiade – Men's 4 × 400 metres relay =

The men's 4 x 400 metres relay event at the 2015 Summer Universiade was held on 11 and 12 July at the Gwangju Universiade Main Stadium.

== Medalists ==
Gold	Silver	Bronze
Dominican Republic; Juander Santos; Gustavo Cuesta; Máximo Mercedes; Luguelín Santos; Leonel Bonon*	Japan; Julian Jrummi Walsh; Nobuya Kato; Takamasa Kitagawa; Kentaro Sato	Poland; Mateusz Zagórski; Michał Pietrzak; Kamil Gurdak; Rafał Omelko; Robert Bryliński*

* Athletes who competed in heats only.

== Results ==
=== Heats ===
Qualification: First 2 teams of each heat (Q) plus the next 2 fastest (q) qualified for the final.

Rank	Heat	Nation	Athletes	Time	Notes
1	1	South Africa	Pieter Conradie, Jon Seeliger, Lindsay Hanekom, Shaun de Jager	3:04.79	Q
2	1	Japan	Julian Jrummi Walsh, Kentaro Sato, Takamasa Kitagawa, Nobuya Kato	3:04.83	Q
3	3	South Korea	Park Bong-go, Lee Jun, Choi Dong-baek, Park Chan-yang	3:06.60	Q, SB
4	2	Dominican Republic	Juander Santos, Máximo Mercedes, Leonel Bonon, Luguelín Santos	3:07.73	Q
5	2	Poland	Mateusz Zagórski, Michał Pietrzak, Robert Bryliński, Rafał Omelko	3:07.86	Q
6	3	Australia	Deluca Lawson-Matthew, Alexander Carew, Raymond Smith, Alexander Beck	3:07.95	Q
7	3	United States	Cole Lambourne, Keyunta Hayes, Joe Herrera, Ronald Baker	3:08.67	q
8	1	Botswana	Sakaria Kamberuka, Katlego Lenkopane, Rebeilwe Thwanyane, Leaname Maotoanong	3:09.86	q
9	3	Thailand	Pooriphat Kaijun, Srikharin Wannasa, Saharat Sammayan, Kunanon Sukkaew	3:10.69	
10	3	New Zealand	Bailey Stewart, Scott Burch, Jackson Henry, Cameron French	3:11.49	
11	2	Denmark	Kasper Olsen, Emil Kaare Strom, Philip Braun, Nick Ekelund Arenander	3:13.14	
11	1	Kazakhstan	Aitzhan Baisbayev, Omirserik Bekenov, Andrey Sokolov, Mikhail Litvin	3:13.59	
12	1	Uganda	Daniel Bingi, Pius Adome, Godwin Byamukama, Richard Ongom	3:16.32	
13	2	Norway	Carl Emil Kåshagen, Mauritz Kåshagen, Henrik Holmberg, Håvard Hildeskor	3:18.25	
14	2	Costa Rica	Jocksan Morales, David Hodgson, Donald Arias, Gerald Drummond	3:19.34	
15	3	Slovenia	Urh Štupar, Klavdij Ferle, Denis Koren, Peter Hribaršek	3:20.85	
	2	Russia	Valentin Morozov, Nikita Andriyanov, Maksim Fayzulin, Aleksey Kenig	DNF	
	2	Ghana	Robert Dwumfour, George Effah, Henry Sunbawiereh, Robert Annak	DQ	R163.5
	2	Nigeria	Adedamola Adeniji, Afoke Oshasha, Chukwuma Madunta, Seun Olaniyi	DQ	R170.14
	3	Sri Lanka	Wijesundara Mudiyanselage, Vishvajith Gammahelage, Disanayaka Mudiyanselage, Athawuda Wannaku	DQ	R170.14
	1	Oman		DNS	

=== Final ===
Official Video

Rank	Nation	Athletes	Time	Notes
1st place, gold medalist(s)	Dominican Republic	Juander Santos, Gustavo Cuesta, Máximo Mercedes, Luguelín Santos	3:05.05	
2nd place, silver medalist(s)	Japan	Julian Jrummi Walsh, Nobuya Kato, Takamasa Kitagawa, Kentaro Sato	3:07.75	
3rd place, bronze medalist(s)	Poland	Mateusz Zagórski, Michał Pietrzak, Kamil Gurdak, Rafał Omelko	3:07.77	
4	South Korea	Kim Ui-yeon, Park Bong-go, Choi Dong-baek, Lee Jun	3:08.17	
5	Australia	Deluca Lawson-Matthew, Alexander Carew, Raymond Smith, Alexander Beck	3:12.64	
	United States	Cole Lambourne, Ronald Baker, Bryce Robinson, Shaquille Walker	DQ	R170.20
	South Africa	Pieter Conradie, Jon Seeliger, Lindsay Hanekom, Shaun de Jager	DQ	R163.3
	Botswana	Leaname Maotoanong, Katlego Lenkopane, Rebeilwe Thwanyane, Sakaria Kamberuka	DQ	R162.7
