= Gustavo Cuesta =

Dominican Republic sprinter

Personal information
- Full name: Gustavo Cuesta Rosario
- Born: 14 November 1988 (age 37) San Pedro de Macorís, Dominican Republic
- Height: 1.83 m (6 ft 0 in)
- Weight: 80 kg (176 lb)

Sport
- Country: Dominican Republic
- Sport: Track and field
- Event: Sprint
Medal record
Men's Athletics
Representing Dominican Republic
CAC Championships
Bronze medal – third place	2013 Morelia	400 m
Bronze medal – third place	2013 Morelia	4x400 m relay
- Updated on 13 December 2014

Gustavo Cuesta Rosario (born 14 November 1988) is a Dominican Republic sprinter. He competed in the 4 × 400 m relay event at the 2012 Summer Olympics and the 400 m and 4 × 400 m at the 2016 Olympics.

== Personal bests ==
=== Outdoor ===
- 100 m: 10.55 s (wind: +1.4 m/s) – Carolina, Puerto Rico, 21 March 2015
- 200 m: 20.71 s (wind: +1.1 m/s) – Saint-Martin, France, 9 May 2015
- 400 m: 45.09 s – San José, Costa Rica, 7 August 2015

=== Indoor ===
- 200 m: 21.16 s – Boston, United States, 8 February 2014
- 400 m: 45.95 s – Boston, United States, 8 February 2014

== International competitions ==
Year	Competition	Venue	Position	Event	Notes
Representing the Dominican Republic
2008	Ibero-American Championships	Iquique, Chile	12th (h)	200 m	22.05 (wind: -1.7 m/s)
2008	Ibero-American Championships	Iquique, Chile	–	4 × 100 m	DNF
2008	Ibero-American Championships	Iquique, Chile	3rd	4 × 400 m	3:08.70
2008	Central American and Caribbean Championships	Cali, Colombia	22nd (h)	200 m	21.26 w A (wind: +2.2 m/s)
2008	Central American and Caribbean Championships	Cali, Colombia	7th	4 × 400 m	3:08.08
2008	NACAC Under-23 Championships	Toluca, Mexico	3rd (h)	100 m	10.71 A (wind: 0.0 m/s)
2008	NACAC Under-23 Championships	Toluca, Mexico	4th (h)	200 m	21.67 A (wind: -1.2 m/s)
2008	NACAC Under-23 Championships	Toluca, Mexico	5th	4 × 100 m	40.87
2009	Central American and Caribbean Championships	Havana, Cuba	13th (h)	200 m	21.28 (wind: -0.3 m/s)
2009	Central American and Caribbean Championships	Havana, Cuba	12th (h)	400 m	21.23 (wind: +0.5 m/s)
2009	Central American and Caribbean Championships	Havana, Cuba	4th	4 × 100 m	39.52
2009	World Championships	Berlin, Germany	7th (h)^{1}	4 × 400 m	3:02.76
2010	Ibero-American Championships	San Fernando, Spain	5th	200 m	21.46 (wind: +0.2 m/s)
2010	Ibero-American Championships	San Fernando, Spain	5th	4 × 100 m	40.15
2010	Ibero-American Championships	San Fernando, Spain	4th	4 × 400 m	3:05.99
2010	NACAC Under-23 Championships	Miramar, United States	8th	400 m	47.93
2010	Central American and Caribbean Games	Mayagüez, Puerto Rico	15th (h)	400 m	47.70
2010	Central American and Caribbean Games	Mayagüez, Puerto Rico	4th	4 × 400 m	3:04.68
2011	Central American and Caribbean Championships	Mayagüez, Puerto Rico	18th (h)	200 m	21.56 (wind: +0.7 m/s)
2011	Pan American Games	Guadalajara, Mexico	2nd	4 × 400 m	3:00.44 A
2012	Ibero-American Championships	Barquisimeto, Venezuela	9th (h)	200 m	21.16 w (wind: +2.5 m/s)
2012	Ibero-American Championships	Barquisimeto, Venezuela	10th (h)	400 m	47.24
2012	Ibero-American Championships	Barquisimeto, Venezuela	3rd	4 × 400 m	3:03.02
2012	Olympic Games	London, United Kingdom	–	4 × 400 m	DQ
2013	BVI Twilight Invitational	Road Town, British Virgin Islands	4th	200 m	21.06 (wind: -0.3 m/s)
2013	BVI Twilight Invitational	Road Town, British Virgin Islands	1st place, gold medalist(s)	400 m	45.87
2013	Central American and Caribbean Championships	Morelia, Mexico	3rd	400 m	46.20 A
2013	Central American and Caribbean Championships	Morelia, Mexico	3rd	4 × 400 m	3:02.82 A
2013	World Championships	Moscow, Russia	20th (sf)	400 m	45.93
2013	World Championships	Moscow, Russia	14th (h)	4 × 400 m	3:03.61
2014	World Indoor Championships	Sopot, Poland	20th (h)	400 m	47.43
2014	World Relays	Nassau, Bahamas	12th (B)	4 × 400 m	3:04.44
2014	Central American and Caribbean Games	Xalapa, Mexico	8th (sf)	200 m	21.55 A (wind: -0.4 m/s)
2014	Central American and Caribbean Games	Xalapa, Mexico	2nd	4 × 100 m	39.01 A
2015	Universiade	Gwangju, South Korea	4th	400 m	45.78
2015	Universiade	Gwangju, South Korea	1st	4 × 400 m	3:05.05
2015	NACAC Championships	San José, Costa Rica	5th	400m	45.99
2015	NACAC Championships	San José, Costa Rica	4th	4 × 400 m	3:01.73
2015	World Championships	Beijing, China	35th (h)	400 m	45.59
2015	World Championships	Beijing, China	10th (h)	4 × 400 m	3:00.15
2016	World Indoor Championships	Portland, United States	23rd (h)	400 m	48.46
2016	Ibero-American Championships	Rio de Janeiro, Brazil	9th (h)	400 m	46.90
2016	Olympic Games	Rio de Janeiro, Brazil	43rd (h)	400 m	46.92
2016	Olympic Games	Rio de Janeiro, Brazil	10th (h)	4 × 400 m	3:01.76
2017	IAAF World Relays	Nassau, Bahamas	–	4 × 400 m	DQ

^{1}: Competed only in the heat.
