= Mauritz Kåshagen =

Norwegian sprinter (born 1989)

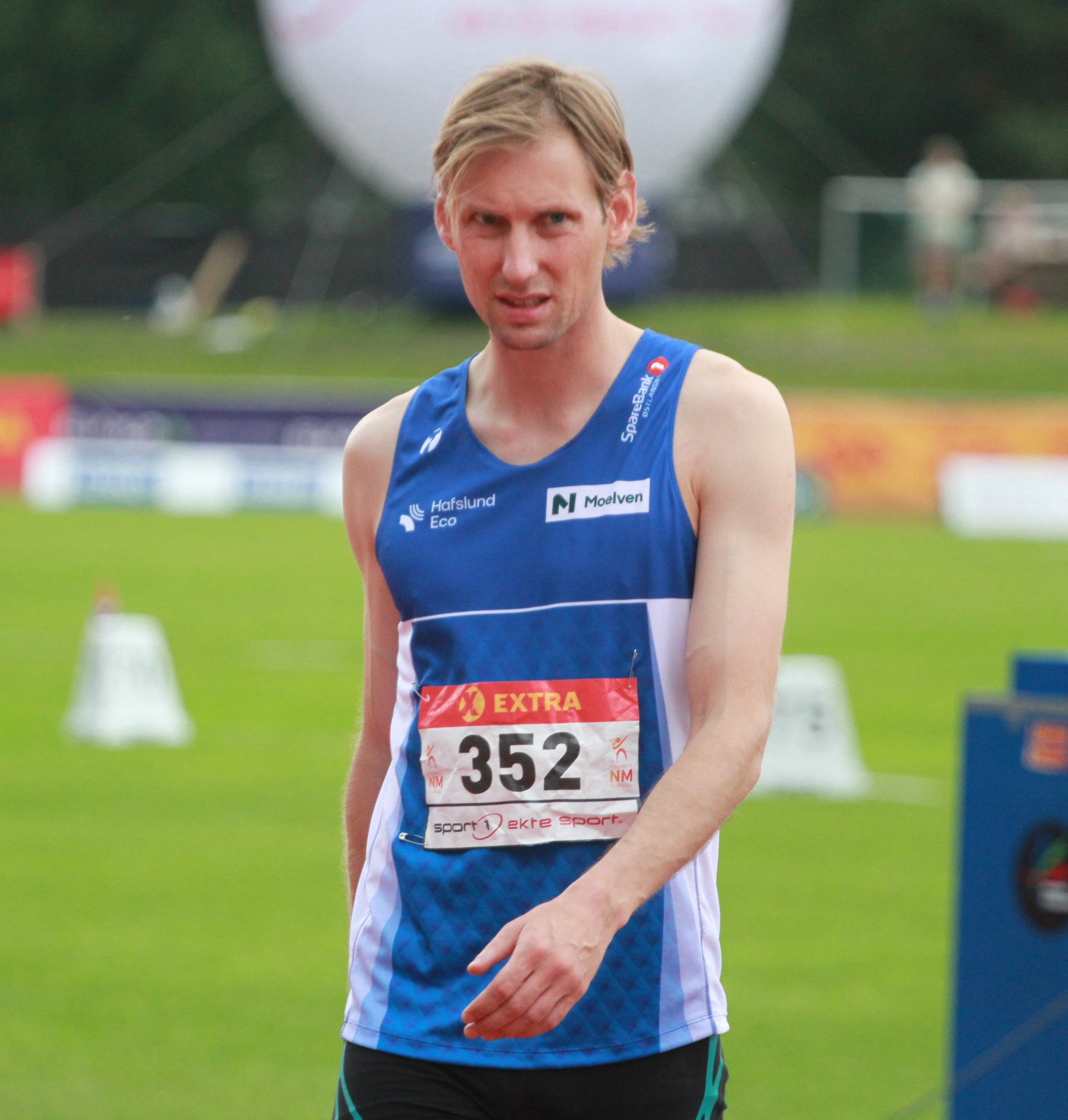
- Kåshagen at the 2022 Norwegian Athletics Championships

Personal information
- Nationality: Norwegian
- Born: 15 February 1989 (age 37)
- Home town: Ringsaker Municipality, Norway
- Height: 191 cm (6 ft 3 in)
- Weight: 80 kg (180 lb)

Sport
- Sport: Athletics
- Events: 400 metres, 4 × 400 metres relay
- Club: Moelven IL
- Coached by: Eystein Enoksen

Achievements and titles
- National finals: 2008 Norwegian Indoors; • 400 m, 2nd (silver); 2008 Norwegian Champs; • 400 m, 2nd (silver); 2008 Norwegian U20s; • 200 m, 3rd (bronze); 2009 Norwegian Indoors; • 400 m, 1st (silver); 2009 Norwegian Champs; • 400 m, 4th; 2010 Norwegian U20s; • 200 m, 1st (gold); 2010 Norwegian Champs; • 400 m, 2nd (silver); 2012 Norwegian Indoors; • 400 m, 1st (gold); 2012 Norwegian Champs; • 400 m, 3rd (bronze); 2015 Norwegian Indoors; • 400 m, 2nd (silver); 2015 Norwegian Champs; • 400 m, 3rd (bronze); 2016 Norwegian Indoors; • 400 m, 2nd (silver); 2016 Norwegian Champs; • 400 m, 3rd (bronze); 2017 Norwegian Indoors; • 400 m, 2nd (silver); 2017 Norwegian Champs; • 400 m, 2nd (silver); 2019 Norwegian Indoors; • 400 m, 1st (gold); 2019 Norwegian Champs; • 5 × 200 m relay, 1st (gold); 2022 Norwegian Champs; • 400 m, DNF
- Personal bests: 400m: 46.88 i (2016); 200m: 21.36 i (2016)

Mauritz Kåshagen (born 15 February 1989) is a Norwegian sprinter and a four-time national champion in the 400 metres indoors. His time of 46.88 seconds in January 2016 was briefly the national indoor record before Karsten Warholm broke it later that year.

== Biography ==
Kåshagen was raised in Ringsaker Municipality and began competing at the national level in 2008, when he got silver medals at the indoor and outdoor Norwegian Athletics Championships in the 400 metres. That same year he competed in the World Junior Championships 400 m, where he advanced to the semifinals but did not make the final.

Kåshagen competed at the European Athletics Team Championships six times between 2009 and 2017, three times in the lesser "First League" and three times in the Super League, the highest tier of competition. In the First League, his best overall finish was 4th in the 4 × 400 m relay at the 2014 edition, and his best individual finish was 5th in the 400 m at the 2017 edition. In the Super League, Kåshagen only competed in the 4 × 400 m, finishing 11th in all three appearances in 2010, 2013, and 2015.

Kåshagen's 2011 season was cut short due to a hip flexor injury, which Kåshagen's said was particularly frustrating because the winning time at the Norwegian Athletics Championships that year was only 48.99 seconds.

At the 2015 Summer Universiade, Kåshagen competed in both the individual 400 m and the relay. In the individual event, he advanced past the first round on time but did not make the finals, registering the slowest overall time in the semis. In the relay, Team Norway finished 4th in the heats and did not qualify for the final.

In 2016, Kåshagen set personal bests in the indoor 200 metres and 400 metres of 21.36 seconds and 46.88 seconds respectively, times which are also better than his outdoor personal bests in those events. His 400 metres time stood as the Norwegian indoor national record until Olympic gold medalist Karsten Warholm broke it later in the season. In June, Kåshagen was told that he was selected to compete in the individual 400 m at the 2016 European Athletics Championships, but that offer was controversially rescinded the next day as the Norwegian Athletics Association claimed they had made a mistake. Kåshagen was nonetheless invited to competed on the 4 × 400 m relay, where his team finished last place in the heats despite being led off by Karsten Warholm.

In 2017, Kåshagen finally had an opportunity to compete individually at the European Championships indoors. However, he was disqualified for a false start in his heat, preventing him from registering a time. Kåshagen competed in the 2017 Diamond League season, finishing 8th in the Oslo Diamond League. In 2018, Kåshagen cited Henrik Ingebrigtsen and Filip Ingebrigtsen as his role models.

As of 2023, Kåshagen was involved in supporting the Norwegian Athletics Association to promote para-athletics in Norway.

== Statistics ==
=== Personal bests ===
Event	Mark	Competition	Venue	Date
400 metres (indoors)	46.88 NR		Bærum, Norway	30 January 2016
200 metres (indoors)	21.36	Tyrvinglekene	Bærum, Norway	7 February 2016
