= Leaname Maotoanong =

Motswana sprinter (1991–2026)

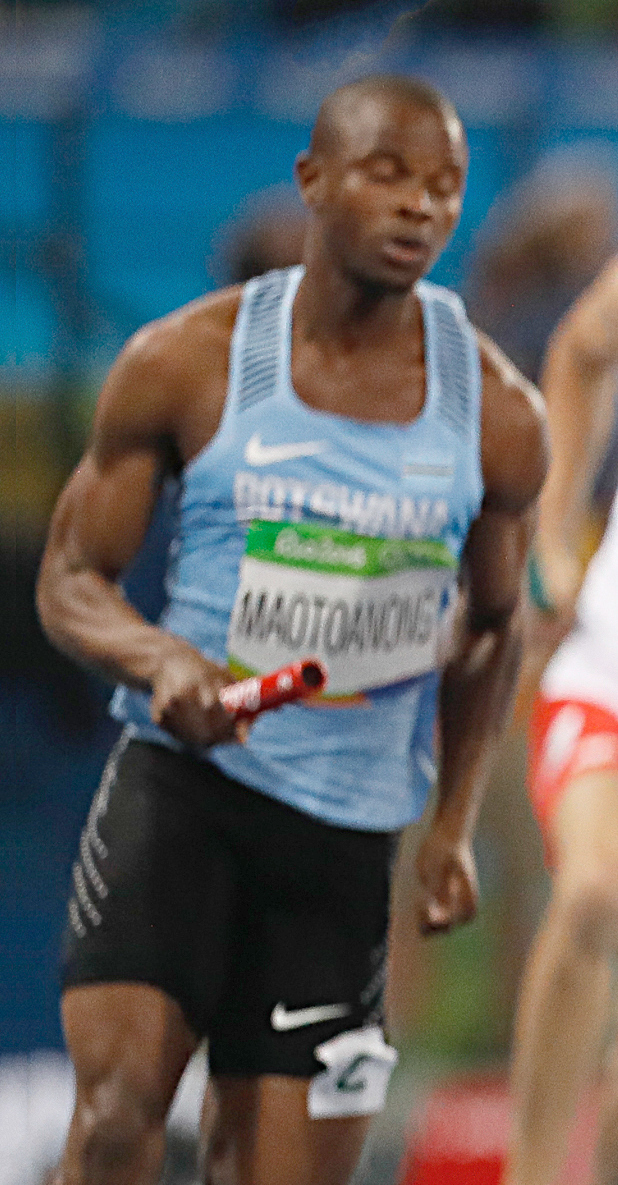
- Maotoanong at the 2016 Olympics

Personal information
- Born: 9 May 1991 Shoshong, Botswana
- Died: 22 October 2026 (aged 35)
- Height: 1.78 m (5 ft 10 in)
- Weight: 72 kg (159 lb)

Sport
- Sport: Athletics
- Events: 200 m, 400 m
- Club: SSKB
- Coached by: Justice Dipeba

Achievements and titles
- Personal bests: 200 m – 20.58 (2015); 400 m – 45.63 (2015)
Medal record
Men's athletics
Representing Botswana
African Games
Silver medal – second place	2015 Brazzaville	4x400 m
African Championships
Gold medal – first place	2014 Marrakesh	4×400 m
Gold medal – first place	2016 Durban	4×400 m

Leaname Maotoanong (9 May 1991 – 22 October 2026) was a Botswanan sprinter competing in the 200 and 400 metres. He won a silver medal at the 2015 Summer Universiade. Maotoanong won the gold medal with the Botswana 4 × 400 metres relay team setting the new national record of 3:01.89. He died on 22 October 2026, at the age of 35.

== Competition record ==
Year	Competition	Venue	Position	Event	Notes
Representing Botswana
2014	African Championships	Marrakesh, Morocco	15th (sf)	200 m	21.22
2014	African Championships	Marrakesh, Morocco	1st	4 × 400 m relay	3:01.89
2015	IAAF World Relays	Nassau, Bahamas	8th	4 × 400 m relay	3:03.73
2015	Universiade	Gwangju, South Korea	2nd	400 m	45.63
2015	Universiade	Gwangju, South Korea	8th (h)	4 × 400 m relay	3:09.86
2015	World Championships	Beijing, China	9th (h)	4 × 400 m relay	2:59.95
2015	African Games	Brazzaville, Republic of the Congo	11th (sf)	400 m	45.99
2015	African Games	Brazzaville, Republic of the Congo	2nd	4 × 400 m relay	3:00.95
2016	African Championships	Durban, South Africa	1st	4 × 400 m relay	3:02.20
2016	Olympic Games	Rio de Janeiro, Brazil	5th	4 × 400 m relay	2:59.06
2018	Commonwealth Games	Gold Coast, Australia	1st	4 × 400 m relay	3:01.78
2018	African Championships	Asaba, Nigeria	28th (h)	200 m	21.65
2019	African Games	Rabat, Morocco	7th	200 m	21.04
2019	African Games	Rabat, Morocco	5th (h)	4 × 100 m relay	39.91
