= 2014 African Championships in Athletics – Men's 4 × 400 metres relay =

The men's 4 × 400 metres relay event at the 2014 African Championships in Athletics was held on August 14 on Stade de Marrakech.

== Results ==
Rank	Nation	Competitors	Time	Notes
1st place, gold medalist(s)	Botswana	Pako Seribe, Nijel Amos, Leaname Maotoanong, Isaac Makwala	3:01.89	NR
2nd place, silver medalist(s)	Nigeria	Noah Akwu, Robert Simmons, Miles Ukaoma, Amaechi Morton	3:03.09	
3rd place, bronze medalist(s)	Kenya	Mark Mutai, Solomon Buoga, Nicholas Bett, Boniface Mucheru	3:07.35	
4	Algeria	Miloud Laradj, Youcef Tahinkat, Skander Djamil Athmani, Soufiane Bouhadda	3:10.04	
5	Ethiopia	Gebra Galcha, Abduljebar Hussen, Fikiru Abu, Haji Turie	3:11.27	
6	Morocco	Mustapha Ghizlane, Younés Belkaifa, Abdelhadi Messaoudi, Soufiane Messaoudi	3:12.10	
	Ghana		DNS	
