= Bereket Desta =

Ethiopian sprinter (born 1990)

Personal information
- Born: 23 May 1990 (age 36) Sinkata, Ethiopia
- Height: 1.80 m (5 ft 11 in)
- Weight: 63 kg (139 lb)

Sport
- Country: Ethiopia
- Sport: Athletics
- Event: 400m

Bereket Desta Gebretsadik (Amharic: ደስታ በረከት; born 23 May 1990) is an Ethiopian sprinter. At the 2012 Summer Olympics, he competed in the Men's 400 metres.

== Competition record ==
| Year | Competition | Venue | Position | Event | Notes |
Representing Ethiopia
| 2008 | African Championships | Addis Ababa, Ethiopia | 17th (sf) | 200 m | 21.84 |
| 2008 | African Championships | Addis Ababa, Ethiopia | 16th (sf) | 400 m | 47.56 |
| 2008 | African Championships | Addis Ababa, Ethiopia | 8th | 4 × 400 m relay | 3:07.71 |
| 2008 | World Junior Championships | Bydgoszcz, Poland | 17th (h) | 400 m | 47.80 |
| 2010 | African Championships | Nairobi, Kenya | 8th | 400 m | 47.14 |
| 2010 | African Championships | Nairobi, Kenya | 6th | 4 × 400 m relay | 3:08.96 |
| 2011 | All-Africa Games | Maputo, Mozambique | 4th | 400 m | 46.56 |
| 2012 | African Championships | Porto-Novo, Benin | 11th (sf) | 400 m | 47.05 |
| 2012 | African Championships | Porto-Novo, Benin | – | 4 × 400 m relay | DQ |
| 2012 | Olympic Games | London, United Kingdom | 41st (h) | 400 m | 47.40 |
