= Mark Mutai =

Kenyan sprinter

Medal record

Men's athletics

Representing Kenya

Commonwealth Games
Gold medal – first place	2010 Delhi	400 m
Silver medal – second place	2010 Delhi	4×400 m

All-Africa Games
Gold medal – first place	2011 Maputo	4×400 m
Bronze medal – third place	2011 Maputo	400 m

African Championships
Gold medal – first place	2010 Nairobi	4×400 m
Bronze medal – third place	2012 Porto-Novo	4×400 m
Bronze medal – third place	2014 Marrakesh	4×400 m

Continental Cup
Bronze medal – third place	2010 Split	4×400 m

Mark Kiprotich Mutai (born 23 March 1978), also spelled Muttai, is a Kenyan runner who specializes in 400 metres. He is a Commonwealth Games gold medallist.

He competed at the 2009 world championships in Berlin, Germany, but did not advance from the heats.

In 2010 he was part of the Kenyan 4x400 metres relay team that won gold at the 2010 African Championships in Athletics. In the individual event he was fourth, despite recording the same time as bronze medallist Gary Kikaya of DR Congo.

Mutai was part of the African 4x400 metres relay team that finished third at the 2010 IAAF Continental Cup.

He won 400 metres gold medal at the 2010 Commonwealth Games.

He is affiliated to Kenyan Armed Forces.

== Competition record ==
Year	Competition	Venue	Position	Event	Notes
Representing Kenya
2009	World Championships	Berlin, Germany	43rd (h)	400 m	47.04
2010	African Championships	Nairobi, Kenya	4th	400 m	45.28
2010	African Championships	Nairobi, Kenya	1st	4 × 400 m relay	3:02.96
2010	Continental Cup	Split, Croatia	3rd	4 × 400 m relay	3:02.62
2010	Commonwealth Games	New Delhi, India	1st	400 m	45.44
2010	Commonwealth Games	New Delhi, India	2nd	4 × 400 m relay	3:03.84
2011	World Championships	Daegu, South Korea	6th	4 × 400 m relay	3:01.15
2011	All-Africa Games	Maputo, Mozambique	3rd	400 m	46.52
2011	All-Africa Games	Maputo, Mozambique	1st	4 × 400 m relay	3:03.10
2012	African Championships	Porto-Novo, Benin	15th (sf)	400 m	47.35
2012	African Championships	Porto-Novo, Benin	3rd	4 × 400 m relay	3:04.12
2014	IAAF World Relays	Nassau, Bahamas	15th (h)	4 × 400 m relay	3:04.69
2014	Commonwealth Games	Glasgow, United Kingdom	31st (h)	400 m	47.60
2014	Commonwealth Games	Glasgow, United Kingdom	–	4 × 400 m relay	DQ
2014	African Championships	Marrakesh, Morocco	9th (sf)	400 m	46.77
2014	African Championships	Marrakesh, Morocco	3rd	4 × 400 m relay	3:07.35
