= Ali Ngaimoko =

Ugandan sprinter

Ali Ngaimoko (born 18 June 1989) is a Ugandan sprinter who specialized in the 200 and 400 metres.

He was born in Arua District. In the 200 metres he reached the semi-final at the 2010 African Championships, at the 2011 All-Africa Games and the 2012 African Championships.

In the 400 metres he finished seventh at the 2012 African Championships. He also reached the semi-final at the 2011 All-Africa Games.

In the 4 × 400 metres relay he finished seventh at the 2010 African Championships. He also competed at the 2010 African Championships 4 × 100 metres relay, but was disqualified.

His personal best times are 20.92 seconds in the 200 metres, achieved in July 2011 in Nairobi; and 46.27 seconds in the 400 metres, achieved in July 2012 in Kumasi.
