= Pako Seribe =

Botswana sprinter (born 1991)

Personal information
- Nationality: Botswana
- Born: 7 April 1991 (age 35) Gaborone, Botswana
- Height: 1.75 m (5 ft 9 in)
- Weight: 74 kg (163 lb)

Sport
- Sport: Athletics
- Event(s): 200 m, 400 m
Medal record
Men's athletics
Representing Botswana
African Championships
Gold medal – first place	2014 Marrakesh	4×400 m
Silver medal – second place	2010 Nairobi	4×400 m
- Updated on 26 August 2016

Pako Seribe (born 7 April 1991) is a Botswana sprinter competing in the 200 and 400 metres. He represented his country at two consecutive World Championships, in 2011 and 2013.

His personal bests are 20.17 seconds in the 200 metres (Molepolole 2015) and 45.00 seconds in the 400 metres (Velenje 2015).

== Competition record ==
Year	Competition	Venue	Position	Event	Notes
Representing Botswana
2007	World Youth Championships	Ostrava, Czech Republic	9th (sf)	400 m	48.31
2007	African Junior Championships	Ouagadougou, Burkina Faso	3rd	400 m	47.44
2008	World Junior Championships	Bydgoszcz, Poland	13th (h)	4 × 400 m relay	3:11.08
2009	African Junior Championships	Bambous, Mauritius	1st	400 m	46.56
2009	African Junior Championships	Bambous, Mauritius	3rd	4 × 400 m relay	3:15.08
2010	World Indoor Championships	Doha, Qatar	–	4 × 400 m relay	DQ
2010	World Junior Championships	Moncton, Canada	8th	400 m	48.07
2010	World Junior Championships	Moncton, Canada	7th	4 × 400 m relay	3:10.74
2010	African Championships	Nairobi, Kenya	2nd	4 × 400 m relay	3:05.16
2011	World Championships	Daegu, South Korea	27th (h)	400 m	46.97
2011	All-Africa Games	Maputo, Mozambique	8th	400 m	46.88
2012	World Indoor Championships	Istanbul, Turkey	11th (h)	4 × 400 m relay	3:13.21
2012	African Championships	Porto-Novo, Benin	25th (h)	400 m	49.12
2013	World Championships	Moscow, Russia	22nd (h)	4 × 400 m relay	3:05.74
2014	Commonwealth Games	Glasgow, United Kingdom	21st (sf)	400 m	47.43
2014	African Championships	Marrakesh, Morocco	6th	400 m	45.50
2014	African Championships	Marrakesh, Morocco	1st	4 × 400 m relay	3:01.89
2015	African Games	Brazzaville, Republic of the Congo	17th (sf)	200 m	21.34
2015	African Games	Brazzaville, Republic of the Congo	5th	4 × 100 m relay	39.83
2018	Commonwealth Games	Gold Coast, Australia	–	200 m	DNF
