= Nelton Ndebele =

Zimbabwean sprinter (born 1985)

Medal record

Men's athletics

All-Africa Games
Bronze medal – third place	2007 Algiers	4 × 400

Nelton Ndebele (born 6 June 1985) is a retired Zimbabwean sprinter who specialized in the 400 metres.

Individually he competed at the 2007 All-Africa Games (semi-final) and the 2011 All-Africa Games (semi-final).

In the 4 × 400 metres relay he won a bronze medal at the 2007 All-Africa Games and competed at the 2005 World Championships without reaching the final.

His personal best time was 46.23 seconds, achieved in May 2007 in Windhoek.
