= Mohamed Khouaja =

Libyan sprinter (born 1987)

Medal record

Men's athletics

Representing Libya

African Championships
Gold medal – first place	2010 Nairobi	400 m

Mediterranean Games
Gold medal – first place	2009 Pescara	400 m

Continental Cup
Bronze medal – third place	2010 Split	4x400 metres relay

Mohamed Ashour Khouaja (born 1 November 1987) is a Libyan sprinter, specialising in the 400 metres.

He finished seventh in his semi-final heat of the men's 400 metres at the 2009 World Championships, his first World Championship. He won the gold medal in the 2009 Mediterranean Games 400 metres final, and is the current Libyan national record holder over 400 metres; he set the record when he won gold in the 2010 African Championships in Nairobi.

== International competitions ==
Year	Competition	Venue	Position	Event	Notes
Representing Libya
2005	African Junior Championships	Radès, Tunisia	9th (h)	100 m	10.94
2007	Pan Arab Games	Cairo, Egypt	12th (h)	200 m	21.63
2007	Pan Arab Games	Cairo, Egypt	10th (h)	400 m	49.14
2009	Arab Championships	Damascus, Syria	6th	200 m	21.12
2009	Arab Championships	Damascus, Syria	2nd	400 m	45.35
2009	Mediterranean Games	Pescara, Italy	1st	400 m	45.77
2009	Mediterranean Games	Pescara, Italy	7th	4 × 400 m relay	3:10.00
2009	World Championships	Berlin, Germany	22nd (h)	400 m	46.43
2010	African Championships	Nairobi, Kenya	1st	400 m	44.98
2010	Continental Cup	Split, Croatia	8th	400 m	45.99^{1}
2010	Continental Cup	Split, Croatia	3rd	4 × 400 m relay	3:02.62^{1}
2011	African Games	Maputo, Mozambique	18th (h)	400 m	48.66
2011	Pan Arab Games	Doha, Qatar	12th (h)	400 m	48.84
2012	African Championships	Porto-Novo, Benin	–	200 m	DNF
2012	African Championships	Porto-Novo, Benin	10th (sf)	400 m	46.82
2014	African Championships	Marrakesh, Morocco	5th	400 m	45.40
2015	World Championships	Beijing, China	43rd (h)	400 m	46.50
2015	African Games	Brazzaville, Republic of the Congo	24th (h)	400 m	47.82^{2}

^{1}Representing Africa

^{2}Did not start in the semifinals

== Personal bests ==
- 200 metres - 20.91 sec (2009) - national record.
- 400 metres - 44.98 sec (2010) - national record.
