= Abiola Onakoya =

Nigerian athlete (born 1990)

Personal information
- Full name: Abiola Temi-Tope Onakoya
- Born: 10 October 1990 (age 36) Ijebu Ode, Nigeria
- Education: University of Texas at El Paso

Sport
- Sport: Track and field
- Event: 400 metres
- College team: UTEP Miners
Medal record
Men's athletics
Representing Nigeria
African Championships
Gold medal – first place	2012 Porto-Novo	4×400 m

Abiola Temi-Tope Onakoya (born 10 October 1990) is a Nigerian sprinter specialising in the 400 metres. He represented his country in the 4 × 400 metres relay at the 2013 World Championships and 2016 World Indoor Championships.

== Competition record ==
Year	Competition	Venue	Position	Event	Notes
Representing Nigeria
2009	African Junior Championships	Bambous, Mauritius	2nd	400 m	47.16
2009	African Junior Championships	Bambous, Mauritius	1st	4 × 100 m relay	41.17
2009	African Junior Championships	Bambous, Mauritius	1st	4 × 400 m relay	3:13.50
2012	African Championships	Porto-Novo, Benin	6th	400 m	46.21
2012	African Championships	Porto-Novo, Benin	1st	4 × 400 m relay	3:02.39
2013	World Championships	Moscow, Russia	18th (h)	4 × 400 m relay	3:04.52
2016	World Indoor Championships	Portland, United States	5th	4 × 400 m relay	3:08.55

== Personal bests ==
Outdoor

- 200 metres – 20.83 (+1.7 m/s, El Paso 2013)
- 400 metres – 45.79 (Calabar 2013)

Indoor

- 400 metres – 47.40 (Birmingham, AL 2014)
