= Emmanuel Tugumisirize =

Ugandan sprinter

Emmanuel Tugumisirize (born 30 November 1988) is a retired Ugandan sprinter who specialized in the 400 metres.

Individually he finished seventh at the 2013 Summer Universiade. He also competed at the 2009 Summer Universiade, the 2010 African Championships (semi-final), the 2011 Summer Universiade (semi-final) and the 2014 Commonwealth Games (semi-final).

In the 4 × 400 metres relay he finished seventh at the 2010 African Championships. He also competed at the 2009 Summer Universiade without reaching the final.

His personal best time was 45.69 seconds, achieved in May 2014 in Jacksonville. He competed collegiately for the Middle Tennessee Blue Raiders.
