= Zacharia Kamberuka =

Botswana sprinter

Zacharia Kamberuka (born 28 December 1987) is a retired Botswanan sprinter who specialized in the 400 metres.

In the 400 metres he finished sixth at the 2011 All-Africa Games and fifth at the 2015 Summer Universiade. He competed at the 2010 Commonwealth Games (semi-final) and the 2010 African Championships (did not finish) without reaching the final.

In the 4 × 400 metres relay he finished fourth at the 2008 African Championships, fifth at the 2010 Commonwealth Games, eighth at the 2015 World Relays and was disqualified in the final at the 2015 Summer Universiade. He also competed at the 2007 All-Africa Games (as a heat runner for the eventual gold medallists), the 2010 World Indoor Championships (disqualified) and the 2012 World Indoor Championships without reaching the final.

His personal best time is 45.71 seconds, achieved in April 2010 in Germiston. He also co-holds a Botswanan indoor record in the 4 × 400 metres relay, achieved at the 2012 World Indoor Championships.
