= Isaac Makwala =

Botswana sprinter (born 1985)

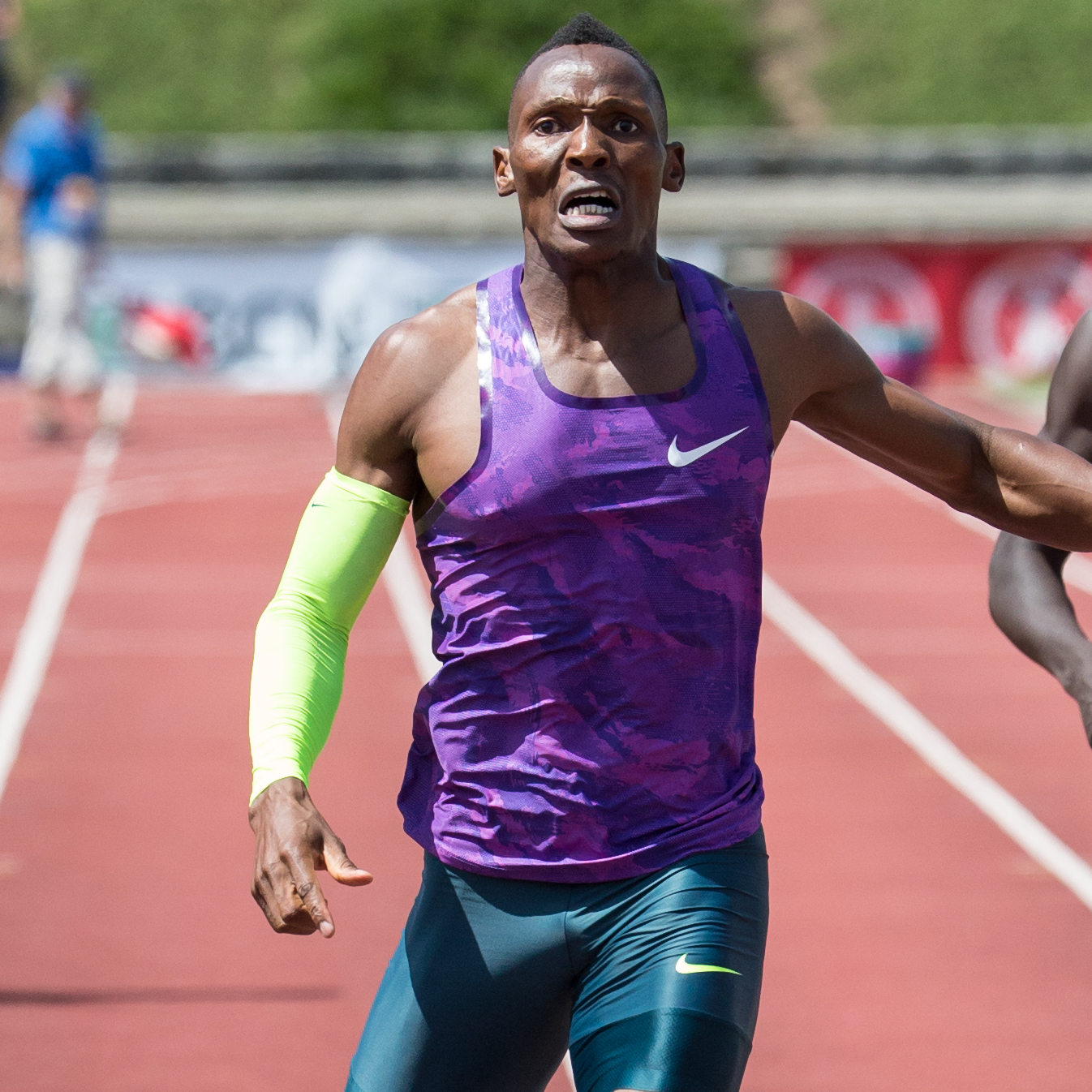
- Makwala in 2015

Personal information
- Born: 24 September 1985 (age 41) Tutume, Botswana
- Height: 1.85 m (6 ft 1 in)
- Weight: 78 kg (172 lb)

Sport
- Sport: Athletics
- Events: 200 metres, 400 metres
- Club: Francistown Athletics Club
Medal record
Men's athletics
Representing Botswana
Olympic Games
Bronze medal – third place	2020 Tokyo	4×400 m relay
IAAF World Relays
Silver medal – second place	2017 Nassau	4x400 m relay
Bronze medal – third place	2021 Chorzów	4×400 m relay
Commonwealth Games
Gold medal – first place	2018 Gold Coast	400 m
Gold medal – first place	2018 Gold Coast	4x400 m relay
African Championships
Gold medal – first place	2012 Porto-Novo	400 m
Gold medal – first place	2014 Marrakesh	400 m
Gold medal – first place	2014 Marrakesh	4x400 m relay
Silver medal – second place	2008 Addis Ababa	400 m
Silver medal – second place	2010 Nairobi	4x400 m relay
Silver medal – second place	2014 Marrakesh	200 m
African Games
Gold medal – first place	2007 Algiers	4x400 m relay
Gold medal – first place	2015 Brazzaville	400 m
Silver medal – second place	2015 Brazzaville	4x400 m relay
Representing Africa
Continental Cup
Silver medal – second place	2014 Marrakesh	400m
Gold medal – first place	2014 Marrakesh	4×400m relay
- Updated on 17 September 2015

Isaac Makwala (born 24 September 1985) is a Botswana sprinter who specializes in the 400 metres.

== Career ==
He was the gold medallist at the Commonwealth Games in 2018. He has also won continental titles at the distance, winning at the 2015 African Games and twice at the African Championships in Athletics (2012, 2014). He has represented his country Botswana at the 2016 Summer Olympics, three times at the Commonwealth Games, and five times at the World Championships in Athletics (2007, 2009, 2013, 2015, 2017). With the Botswana 4 × 400 metres relay team he has won the bronze medal at the 2020 Tokyo Olympics, a silver medal at the 2017 IAAF World Relays and medals at the African Games and Championships.

His personal best time of 43.72, set 5 July 2015 in La Chaux-de-Fonds was an African continental record and ranks him 13th on the all-time list. He is also a sub-20 200 metres runner.

On July 14, 2017, Isaac Makwala became the first man in history to run a 200 m within 20 seconds and a 400 m within 44 seconds on the same day by running 43.92 in the 400, then 19.77 (no wind) in the 200, 2 hours and 20 minutes later at the Meeting de Atletismo Madrid.

He qualified for 400m final at the 2017 World Championships, before being withdrawn from the race, due to illness. He then qualified for the 200 m final after running solo in a time trial of the 200m heat which he had been banned from earlier, placing overall sixth in the final. The "Solo run" inspired the title of his book written by Dr. Tshepang Tshube entitled The Solo Runner: The Untold Story of Isaac Makwala published in 2021.

He competed in the 400m at the 2020 Summer Olympics, finishing 7th in the final.

== Major competitions record ==
Representing Botswana
Year	Competition	Venue	Position	Event	Notes
2007	All-Africa Games	Algiers, Algeria	17th (sf)	400 m	47.02
2007	All-Africa Games	Algiers, Algeria	1st	4 × 400 m relay	3:03.16
2007	World Championships	Osaka, Japan	14th (h)	4 × 400 m relay	3:05.96
2008	African Championships	Addis Ababa, Ethiopia	2nd	400 m	45.64
2008	African Championships	Addis Ababa, Ethiopia	4th	4 × 400 m relay	3:06.54
2009	World Championships	Berlin, Germany	34th (h)	400 m	46.45
2010	World Indoor Championships	Doha, Qatar	– (h)	4 × 400 m relay	DQ
2010	African Championships	Nairobi, Kenya	14th (sf)	400 m	46.92
2010	African Championships	Nairobi, Kenya	2nd	4 × 400 m relay	3:05.16
2010	Commonwealth Games	Melbourne, Australia	20th (sf)	400 m	47.07
2010	Commonwealth Games	Melbourne, Australia	5th	4 × 400 m relay	3:04.65
2011	All-Africa Games	Maputo, Mozambique	7th	400 m	46.78
2012	World Indoor Championships	Istanbul, Turkey	5th (h)	4 × 400 m relay	3:13.21 (NR)
2012	African Championships	Porto-Novo, Benin	1st	400 m	45.25
2012	African Championships	Porto-Novo, Benin	–	4 × 400 m relay	DQ
2013	World Championships	Moscow, Russia	28th (h)	200 m	20.84
2013	World Championships	Moscow, Russia	22nd (h)	4 × 400 m relay	3:05.74
2014	Commonwealth Games	Glasgow, United Kingdom	9th (sf)	400 m	45.57
2014	African Championships	Marrakesh, Morocco	2nd	200 m	20.51
2014	African Championships	Marrakesh, Morocco	1st	400 m	44.23
2014	African Championships	Marrakesh, Morocco	1st	4 × 400 m relay	3:01.89
2015	World Relays	Nassau, Bahamas	8th	4 × 400 m relay	3:03.73
2015	World Championships	Beijing, China	5th	400 m	44.63
2015	World Championships	Beijing, China	9th (h)	4 × 400 m relay	2:59.95
2015	African Games	Brazzaville, Republic of the Congo	1st	400 m	44.35
2015	African Games	Brazzaville, Republic of the Congo	2nd	4 × 400 m relay	3:00.95
2016	African Championships	Durban, South Africa	4th	400 m	46.58
2016	Olympic Games	Rio de Janeiro, Brazil	22nd (sf)	400 m	46.60
2016	Olympic Games	Rio de Janeiro, Brazil	5th	4 × 400 m relay	2:59.06
2017	World Relays	Nassau, Bahamas	2nd	4 × 400 m relay	3:02.28
2017	World Championships	London, United Kingdom	6th	200 m	20.44
2017	World Championships	London, United Kingdom	4th (sf)	400 m	44.30^{1}
2018	Commonwealth Games	Gold Coast, Australia	1st	400 m	44.35
2018	Commonwealth Games	Gold Coast, Australia	1st	4 × 400 m relay	3:01.78
2019	African Games	Rabat, Morocco	8th (sf)	400 m	46.55
2021	World Relays	Chorzów, Poland	3rd	4 × 400 m relay	3:04.77
2021	Olympic Games	Tokyo, Japan	7th	400 m	44.94
2021	Olympic Games	Tokyo, Japan	3rd	4 × 400 m relay	2:57.27
2022	World Championships	Eugene, United States	21st (sf)	400 m	46.04
2022	World Championships	Eugene, United States	6th	4 × 400 m relay	3:00.14

^{1}Did not start in the final

=== Personal bests ===
- 200 metres - 19.77 secs, Madrid, Spain, 14 July 2017
- 400 metres - 43.72 secs (#2 African all time), La Chaux-de-Fonds, Switzerland, 5 July 2015.

=== Track records ===
As of 16 September 2024, Makwala holds the following track records for 200 metres and 400 metres.

==== 200 metres ====
Location	Time	Windspeed m/s	Date
Madrid	19.77	0.0	14/07/2017

==== 400 metres ====
Location	Time	Date
Brazzaville	44.35	15/09/2015
Gold Coast; Queensland	44.35	10/04/2018
La Chaux-de-Fonds	43.72; NR	05/07/2015
Marrakesh	44.23	12/08/2014
