= Oral Thompson =

Jamaican sprinter

Oral Thompson (born 11 December 1982) is a Jamaican sprinter.
