= 2014 IAAF Continental Cup =

2nd IAAF Continental Cup
- Dates: 13–14 September 2014
- Host city: Marrakesh, Morocco
- Venue: Stade de Marrakech
- Events: 40

The 2014 IAAF Continental Cup was an international track and field sporting event that was held in Marrakesh, Morocco, on 13–14 September 2014.

It was the second edition of the IAAF Continental Cup since the name and format was changed from the IAAF World Cup.

== Format ==
The four teams competing in the event were Africa, the Americas, Asia-Pacific and Europe. The two-day competition comprised a program of 20 track and field events for both men and women, resulting in a total of 40 events. Each team entered two athletes in each event, except for relays where one team competed, with a maximum of one athlete from each country per event. No athlete was allowed to double in the 3000 m and 5000 m.

Teams were selected as follows:

- Africa: 2014 African Championships (Marrakesh, 10–14 August)
- Americas: selection by rankings
- Asia-Pacific: selection by rankings
- Europe: 2014 European Championships (Zurich, 12–17 August)

Team points by position
Position	1st	2nd	3rd	4th	5th	6th	7th	8th
Points	8	7	6	5	4	3	2	1
Relay points – 1st = 15pts / 2nd = 11pts / 3rd = 7pts / 4th = 3pts

== Standings ==
Rank	Team	Places								Points
Rank	Team	1st	2nd	3rd	4th	5th	6th	7th	8th	Points
1	Europe	16	13	16	8	11	5	2	3	440.5
2	Americas	12	15	11	6	7	5	12	7	392
3	Africa	11	8	5	11	7	15	13	6	339
4	Asia-Pacific	1	4	8	14	11	10	9	19	259.5

== Medal summary ==
=== Men ===
Event	Gold		Silver		Bronze	
100 metres -0.1	James Dasaolu (GBR); Europe	10.03	Mike Rodgers (USA); Americas	10.04	Femi Ogunode (QAT); Asia-Pacific	10.04; PB
200 metres	Alonso Edward (PAN); Americas	19.98	Rasheed Dwyer (JAM); Americas	19.98; PB	Femi Ogunode (QAT); Asia-Pacific	20.17
400 metres	LaShawn Merritt (USA); Americas	44.40	Isaac Makwala (BOT); Africa	44.84	Yousef Masrahi (KSA); Asia-Pacific	45.03
800 metres	Nijel Amos (BOT); Africa	1:44.88	Mohammed Aman (ETH); Africa	1:45.34	Adam Kszczot (POL); Europe	1:45.72
1500 metres	Ayanleh Souleiman (DJI); Africa	3:48.91	Asbel Kiprop (KEN); Africa	3:49.10	Mahiedine Mekhissi-Benabbad (FRA); Europe	3:49.53
3000 metres	Caleb Mwangangi Ndiku (KEN); Africa	7:52.64	Hayle Ibrahimov (AZE); Europe	7:53.14	Bernard Lagat (USA); Americas	7:53.95
5000 metres	Isiah Kiplangat Koech (KEN); Africa	13:26.86	Zane Robertson (NZL); Asia-Pacific	13:29.27	Nguse Amlosom (ERI); Africa	13:31.31; PB
110 m hurdles	Sergey Shubenkov (RUS); Europe	13.23	Ronnie Ash (USA); Americas	13.25	William Sharman (GBR); Europe	13.25
400 m hurdles	Cornel Fredericks (RSA); Africa	48.34	Kariem Hussein (SUI); Europe	48.48; PB	Javier Culson (PUR); Americas	48.88
3000 m steeplechase	Jairus Kipchoge Birech (KEN); Africa	8:13.18	Evan Jager (USA); Americas	8:14.08	Abubaker Ali Kamal (QAT); Asia-Pacific	8:17.27 SB
4 × 100 m relay	Americas; Kim Collins (SKN); Mike Rodgers (USA); Nesta Carter (JAM); Richard Thompson (TTO)	37.97	Europe; James Ellington (GBR); Harry Aikines-Aryeetey (GBR); Richard Kilty (GBR); Christophe Lemaitre (FRA)	38.62	Africa (Nigeria); Mark Jelks (NGR); Monzavous Edwards (NGR); Obinna Metu (NGR); Ogho-Oghene Egwero (NGR)	39.10
4 × 400 m relay	Africa; Boniface Mucheru Tumuti (KEN); Isaac Makwala (BOT); Saviour Kombe (ZAM); Wayde Van Niekerk (RSA)	3:00.02; PB	Europe; Conrad Williams (GBR); Jakub Krzewina (POL); Donald Sanford (ISR); Martyn Rooney (GBR)	3:00.10	Americas; Javier Culson (PUR); Chris Brown (BAH); Kim Collins (SKN); LaShawn Merritt (USA)	3:02.78
High jump	Bohdan Bondarenko (UKR); Europe	2.37	Mutaz Essa Barshim (QAT); Asia-Pacific	2.34	Derek Drouin (CAN); Americas	2.31
Pole vault	Renaud Lavillenie (FRA); Europe	5.80	Xue Changrui (CHN); Asia-Pacific	5.65	Mark Hollis (USA); Americas	5.55
Long jump	Ignisious Gaisah (NED); Europe	8.11	Will Claye (USA); Americas	7.98	Zarck Visser (RSA); Africa	7.96
Triple jump	Benjamin Compaoré (FRA); Europe	17.48; PB	Godfrey Khotso Mokoena (RSA); Africa	17.35; NR	Will Claye (USA); Americas	17.21
Shot put	David Storl (GER); Europe	21.55	O'Dayne Richards (JAM); Americas	21.10	Joe Kovacs (USA); Americas	20.87
Discus throw	Gerd Kanter (EST); Europe	64.46	Jorge Fernández (CUB); Americas	62.97	Jason Morgan (JAM); Americas	62.70
Hammer throw	Krisztián Pars (HUN); Europe	78.99	Mostafa Al-Gamel (EGY); Africa	78.89	Paweł Fajdek (POL); Europe	78.05
Javelin throw	Ihab Abdelrahman (EGY); Africa	85.44	Vítězslav Veselý (CZE); Europe	83.77	Keshorn Walcott (TTO); Americas	83.52

=== Women ===
Event	Gold		Silver		Bronze	
100 metres	Veronica Campbell-Brown (JAM); Americas	11.08	Michelle-Lee Ahye (TTO); Americas	11.25	Dafne Schippers (NED); Europe	11.26
200 metres	Dafne Schippers (NED); Europe	22.28	Joanna Atkins (USA); Americas	22.53	Myriam Soumaré (FRA); Europe	22.58
400 metres	Francena McCorory (USA); Americas	49.94	Novlene Williams-Mills (JAM); Americas	50.08	Libania Grenot (ITA); Europe	50.60
800 metres	Eunice Jepkoech Sum (KEN); Africa	1:58.21	Ajee' Wilson (USA); Americas	2:00.07	Maryna Arzamasava (BLR); Europe	2:00.31
1500 metres	Sifan Hassan (NED); Europe	4:05.99	Shannon Rowbury (USA); Americas	4:07.21	Dawit Seyaum (ETH); Africa	4:07.61
3000 metres	Genzebe Dibaba (ETH); Africa	8:57.53	Meraf Bahta (SWE); Europe	8:58.48	Susan Kuijken (NED); Europe	9:01.41
5000 metres	Almaz Ayana (ETH); Africa	15:33.32	Joyce Chepkirui (KEN); Africa	15:58.31; PB	Joanne Pavey (GBR); Europe	15:58.67
100 m hurdles	Dawn Harper Nelson (USA); Americas	12.47; CR	Tiffany Porter (GBR); Europe	12.51; NR	Cindy Roleder (GER); Europe	13.02
400 m hurdles	Kaliese Spencer (JAM); Americas	53.81	Eilidh Child (GBR); Europe	54.42	Adekoya Oluwakemi (BHR); Asia-Pacific	54.70
3000 m steeplechase	Emma Coburn (USA); Americas	9:50.67	Hiwot Ayalew (ETH); Africa	9:51.59	Ruth Jebet (BHR); Asia-Pacific	9:55.24
4 × 100 m relay	Americas; Tianna Bartoletta (USA); Michelle-Lee Ahye (TTO); Samantha Henry-Robinson (JAM); Veronica Campbell-Brown (JAM)	42.44	Europe (Great Britain); Asha Philip (GBR); Ashleigh Nelson (GBR); Anyika Onuora (GBR); Desiree Henry (GBR)	42.98	Asia-Pacific (Japan); Yuki Miyazawa (JPN); Mizuki Nakamura (JPN); Tomoka Tsuchihashi (JPN); Yuki Jimbo (JPN)	45.40
4 × 400 m relay	Americas; Christine Day (JAM); Francena McCorory (USA); Stephenie Ann McPherson (JAM); Novlene Williams-Mills (JAM)	3:20.93; WL	Europe; Indira Terrero (ESP); Małgorzata Hołub (POL); Olha Zemlyak (UKR); Libania Grenot (ITA)	3:24.12	Africa; Patience Okon George (NGR); Folasade Abugan (NGR); Ada Benjamin (NGR); Kabange Mupopo (ZAM)	3:25.51
High jump	Mariya Kuchina (RUS); Europe	1.99	Chaunté Lowe (USA); Americas	1.97 SB	Ana Šimić (CRO); Europe	1,95
Pole vault	Ling Li (CHN); Asia-Pacific	4.55	Angelina Zhuk-Krasnova (RUS); Europe	4.45	Lisa Ryzih (GER); Europe	4.30
Long jump	Éloyse Lesueur (FRA); Europe	6.66	Ivana Španović (SRB); Europe	6.56	Tianna Bartoletta (USA); Americas	6.45
Triple jump	Caterine Ibargüen (COL); Americas	14.52	Ekaterina Koneva (RUS); Europe	14.27	Olha Saladukha (UKR); Europe	14.26
Shot put	Christina Schwanitz (GER); Europe	20.02	Michelle Carter (USA); Americas	19.84; SB	Gong Lijiao (CHN); Asia-Pacific	19.23
Discus throw	Gia Lewis-Smallwood (USA); Americas	64.55	Dani Samuels (AUS); Asia-Pacific	64.39	Sandra Perković (CRO); Europe	62.08
Hammer throw	Anita Włodarczyk (POL); Europe	75.21	Amanda Bingson (USA); Americas	72.38	Martina Hrašnová (SVK); Europe	70.47
Javelin throw	Barbora Špotáková (CZE); Europe	65.52	Sunette Viljoen (RSA); Africa	63.76	Elizabeth Gleadle (CAN); Americas	61.38
