= Anderson Mureta Mutegi =

Kenyan sprinter

Personal information
- Born: 1 May 1987 (age 39) Meru County, Kenya

Sport
- Country: Kenya
- Sport: Athletics
- Event: Sprinting
Medal record
All-Africa Games
Gold medal – first place	2011 Maputo	4×400 m relay
Commonwealth Games
Silver medal – second place	2010 Delhi	4×400 m relay

Anderson Mureta Mutegi (born 1 May 1987) is a Kenyan former athlete who competed as a sprinter.

Mutegi grew up in Chuka and came to sprinting after his capabilities were noticed during high school rugby practice sessions. He was recruited to the University of Texas at El Paso by Olympic sprinter turned college coach Paul Ereng, who managed to secure him a scholarship. He won Conference USA championships across 200 and 400 metres.

A national champion in the 200 metres and 400 metres, Mutegi had international success as a member of Kenya's 4x400 metres relay team, winning gold at the 2011 All-Africa Games and silver at the 2010 Commonwealth Games. He competed at the 2011 World Championships in Daegu and was in an initial squad for the 2012 Summer Olympics.
