= Obakeng Ngwigwa =

Botswana sprinter

Medal record

Men's athletics

Representing Botswana

All-Africa Games
Bronze medal – third place	2011 Maputo	200 m

African Championships
Silver medal – second place	2010 Nairobi	4×400 m
Bronze medal – third place	2006 Bambous	4×400 m

World Junior Championships
Bronze medal – third place	2004 Grosseto	400m

Obakeng Ambrose Ngwigwa (born 9 July 1985 in Serowe) is a Botswana sprinter.

He won the bronze medal over 400 metres at the 2004 World Junior Championships in Athletics with a personal best and national junior record of 45.97 seconds. Obakeng also competed in the 400 metres at the 2006 Commonwealth Games running a time of 47.67 seconds to give him an overall place of 32nd.

From 2006 to 2007, Ngwigwa ran for the Butler Community College track team, winning the 2008 Kansas Relays in the 400m, and the 2008 Texas Relays in the 100m.

In 2008, he joined the University of South Carolina track team, participating in multiple solo and team events, and was named to the Outdoor All-SEC First Team and the Indoor All-SEC Second Team during the 2009-10 season.
