= Saviour Kombe =

Zambian sprinter

Medal record

Representing Africa

Continental Cup
Gold medal – first place	2014 Marrakesh	4x400 m relay

Saviour Kombe (born 3 August 1991) is a Zambian track and field sprinter who specialises in the 400 metres. His personal best for the distance is 45.27 seconds. He is a joint holder of the Zambian record in the 4×100 metres relay and 4×400 metres relay.

He has represented his nation twice at the Commonwealth Games (2010 and 2014) and also at the 2011 All-Africa Games. He placed fourth in the 400 m at the 2014 African Championships in Athletics. He won his first international medal at the 2014 IAAF Continental Cup, winning the relay gold medals for Africa.

== Career ==
Born in Chingola, he began taking part in sprinting in 2005 and was inspired by the achievements of Samuel Matete, Zambia's first athletics world champion and also a Chingola native. Kombe had his first success as a teenager in winning two gold medals at the Southern African Development Community's SADC Games. After a third place at the South African Regional Championships, he was set to compete at the 2007 World Youth Championships in Athletics, but ultimately did not compete. In 2008 he repeated his third-place finish at the regional event.

By his late teens he had establish himself among the nation's top sprinters and represented Zambia in three events at the 2010 African Championships in Athletics. He ran in the heats of the 200 metres, reached the semi-finals of the 400 metres and helped set a Zambian record of 40.94 seconds in the 4×100 metres relay – an event in which Zambia placed seventh in the final. He was chosen for the 400 m alone at the 2010 Commonwealth Games and managed to set a personal best and national junior record of 46.88 seconds in the heats to progress to the semi-finals. The following year he competed at the 2011 All-Africa Games and was again a semi-finalist.

At the 2012 African Championships in Athletics he competed in the 400 m only and despite opening with a personal best of 46.49 seconds he came fifth in his semi-final and did not reach the final round. He competed sparingly in 2013 but re-emerged in 2014 as an improved sprinter. He ran 400 m in under 46 seconds for the first time in July 2014: competing at altitude at Résisprint in La Chaux-de-Fonds, he placed third in 45.48 seconds in a race where Botswana Isaac Makwala broke the African record. He was unable to repeat this form at the 2014 Commonwealth Games, being eliminated in the semi-finals. However, he helped the Zambian team break the 4×400 metres relay national record with a run of 3:07.43 minutes in the heats before finishing eighth in the final.

A fast final at the 2014 African Championships in Athletics saw Kombe improve further to 45.27 seconds. This brought him fourth place while Makwala set a championship record over a second ahead. The finish earned him a place on the relay team for Africa at the 2014 IAAF Continental Cup, an event in which the Africans (Makwala, Kombe, Boniface Mucheru and Wayde Van Niekerk) were victorious.
