= Athletics at the 2007 All-Africa Games – Men's 400 metres =

The men's 400 metres at the 2007 All-Africa Games were held on July 18–20.

== Medalists ==
Gold	Silver	Bronze
California Molefe; Botswana	Talkmore Nyongani; Zimbabwe	Mathieu Gnanligo; Benin

== Results ==
=== Heats ===
Qualification: First 3 of each heat (Q) and the next 6 fastest (q) qualified for the semifinals.

Rank	Heat	Name	Nationality	Time	Notes
1	2	California Molefe	Botswana	45.67	Q
2	5	James Godday	Nigeria	45.81	Q
3	2	Nagmeldin Ali Abubakr	Sudan	45.84	Q
4	2	Eric Milazar	Mauritius	46.03	Q, SB
5	2	Mathieu Gnanligo	Benin	46.08	q
6	1	Talkmore Nyongani	Zimbabwe	46.24	Q
7	6	George Kwoba	Kenya	46.59	Q
8	1	Ezra Sambu	Kenya	46.62	Q
9	3	Thomas Musembi	Kenya	46.72	Q
10	2	Mamadou Hanne	Mali	46.67	q, SB
11	6	Lewis Banda	Zimbabwe	46.68	Q
12	6	Ali Khamis M. Kadam	Tanzania	46.73	Q, PB
13	5	Nelton Ndebele	Zimbabwe	46.75	Q
14	1	Miloud Rahmani	Algeria	46.76	Q
15	1	Mamadou Gueye	Senegal	46.94	q, PB
16	3	Saul Weigopwa	Nigeria	47.03	Q
16	5	Mohamed Mosbah	Libya	47.03	Q, NR
18	5	Isaac Makwala	Botswana	47.24	q
19	4	Gakolokelwang Masheto	Botswana	47.30	Q
20	3	Fernando Augustin	Mauritius	47.46	Q
21	1	Samuel Egadu	Uganda	47.48	q
22	4	Bola Lawal	Nigeria	47.51	Q
23	4	Jean François Degrace	Mauritius	47.81	Q, SB
24	3	Ofentse Mogawane	South Africa	48.10	q
25	5	Haile Merih Weldemicael	Eritrea	48.25	NR
26	1	Modou Lamin Kujabi	Gambia	48.27	PB
27	1	Aboubakar Tawerghi	Libya	48.41	PB
28	5	Nicolau Palanca	Angola	48.43	NJR
29	4	Ismaïla Manga	Gambia	48.94	PB
30	5	Moissa Bizimana	Rwanda	49.22	
31	1	Souleimone Chabal	Mauritania	49.30	
32	3	Ahmat Ousmane	Chad	49.47	
33	2	Sangwa Kibambe	Democratic Republic of the Congo	50.11	
34	6	Geramias da Silva	Guinea-Bissau	50.22	
35	4	Oumar Bella Bah	Guinea	50.41	
36	6	Paul Gorries	South Africa	50.74	
37	6	Jiddou Khoye	Mauritania	51.28	
38	4	Thibault Biwawou	Gabon	51.34	
	6	Adam El Nour	Sudan	DNF	
	2	Frank Puriza	Namibia	DNS	
	3	Nouha Badji	Senegal	DNS	
	3	Zemenu Kassa	Ethiopia	DNS	
	4	Tangeni Akwenye	Namibia	DNS	

=== Semifinals ===
Qualification: First 2 of each semifinal (Q) and the next 2 fastest (q) qualified for the final.

Rank	Heat	Name	Nationality	Time	Notes
1	3	Nagmeldin Ali Abubakr	Sudan	45.25	Q, SB
2	2	California Molefe	Botswana	45.64	Q
3	3	Talkmore Nyongani	Zimbabwe	45.66	Q
4	3	James Godday	Nigeria	45.70	q, SB
5	1	Mathieu Gnanligo	Benin	46.05	Q
6	2	Bola Lawal	Nigeria	46.08	Q, SB
7	2	George Kwoba	Kenya	46.21	q, SB
8	3	Eric Milazar	Mauritius	46.29	
9	1	California Molefe	Botswana	46.30	Q
10	1	Saul Weigopwa	Nigeria	46.51	
11	2	Mohamed Mosbah	Libya	46.55	NR
12	2	Miloud Rahmani	Algeria	46.57	PB
13	2	Nelton Ndebele	Zimbabwe	46.57	PB
14	1	Ezra Sambu	Kenya	46.71	
15	3	Thomas Musembi	Kenya	46.75	
16	3	Mamadou Gueye	Senegal	46.98	
17	3	Isaac Makwala	Botswana	47.02	
18	3	Ai Khamis M. Kadam	Tanzania	47.08	
19	1	Samuel Egadu	Uganda	47.15	PB
20	1	Lewis Banda	Zimbabwe	47.22	
21	1	Jean-François Degrace	Mauritius	47.88	
22	2	Ofentse Mogawane	South Africa	47.96	
23	2	Fernando Augustin	Mauritius	48.02	
24	1	Mamadou Hanne	Mali	48.19	

=== Final ===
Rank	Name	Nationality	Time	Notes
1st place, gold medalist(s)	California Molefe	Botswana	45.59	SB
2nd place, silver medalist(s)	Talkmore Nyongani	Zimbabwe	45.76	
3rd place, bronze medalist(s)	Mathieu Gnanligo	Benin	45.89	NR
4	James Godday	Nigeria	46.02	
5	Bola Lawal	Nigeria	46.26	
6	Nagmeldin Ali Abubakr	Sudan	46.29	
7	Gakolokelwang Masheto	Botswana	46.43	
8	George Kwoba	Kenya	46.45	
