= Athletics at the 2008 Summer Olympics – Men's 400 metres =

Men's 400 metres at the Games of the XXIX Olympiad
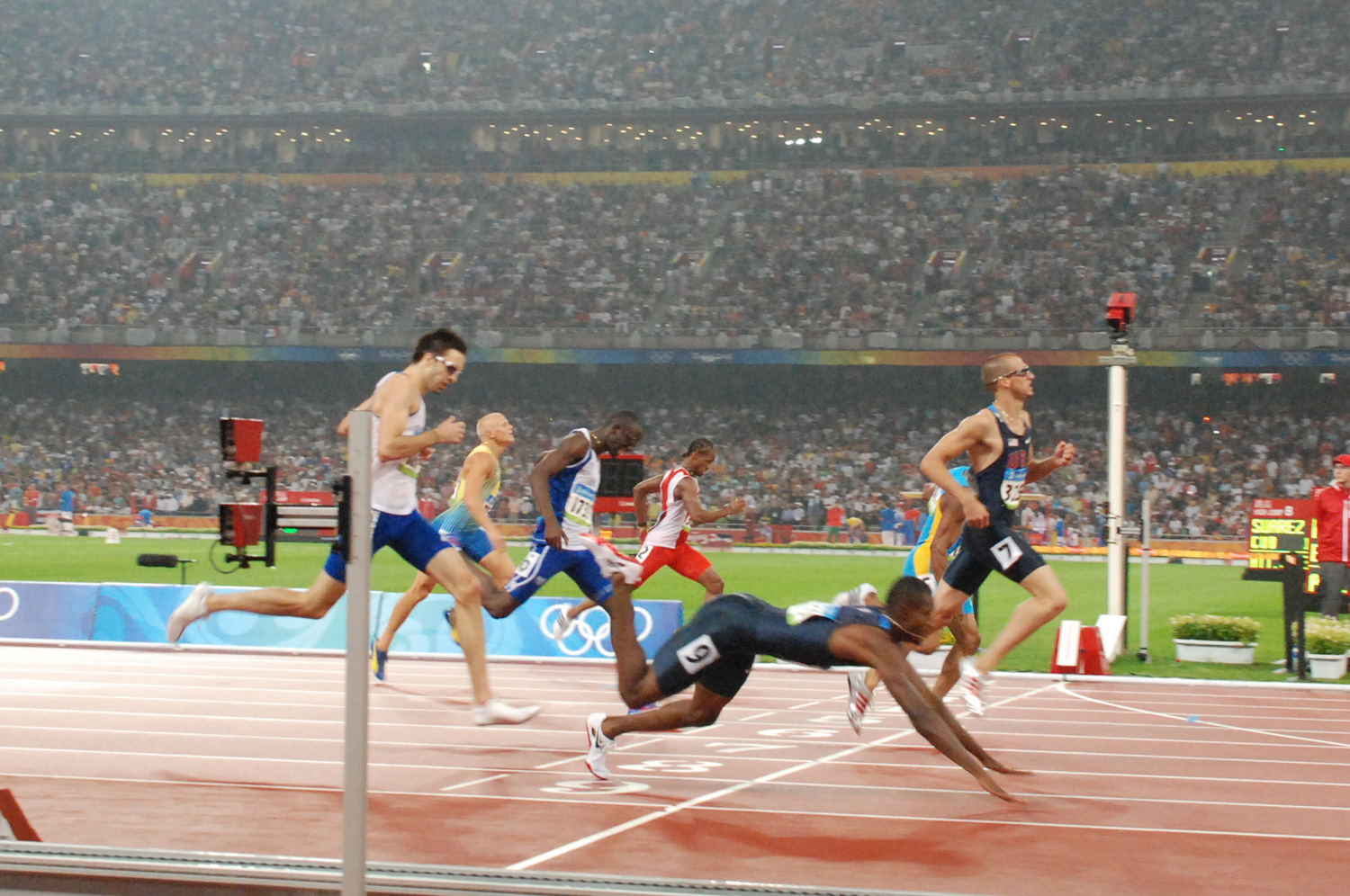
- Crossing the finish line
- Venue: Beijing National Stadium
- Dates: 18 August; 21 August (final)
- Competitors: 55 from 40 nations
- Winning time: 43.75

Medalists
1st place, gold medalist(s)		LaShawn Merritt	United States
2nd place, silver medalist(s)		Jeremy Wariner	United States
3rd place, bronze medalist(s)		David Neville	United States

The men's 400 metres at the 2008 Summer Olympics took place on 18–21 August at the Beijing National Stadium. Fifty-five athletes from 40 nations competed.

The winning margin was an impressive 0.99 seconds which as of 2023 remains the greatest winning margin for the men's Olympic 400 metres since the introduction of fully automatic timing.

The event was won by LaShawn Merritt of the United States, in what would ultimately be the final of seven consecutive American victories stretching from 1984 to 2008; it was the 19th overall title in the event by the United States. Jeremy Wariner took silver to become the fourth man to win two medals in the event, though Merritt kept him from matching Michael Johnson's pair of golds. David Neville's bronze completed the American podium sweep, the second consecutive sweep in the event and the fifth overall (1904, 1968, 1988, 2004).

== Summary ==
The defending champion was Jeremy Wariner, who also won World Championship titles in 2005 and 2007 preceding the 2008 Olympics. Wariner made headlines earlier in the season when he dropped long time coach Clyde Hart, in favor of Hart's assistant Michael Ford. All season, Wariner did not show the dominance of the previous three seasons. At the Olympic Trials he was runner up to LaShawn Merritt, the World Championship silver medalist. The semi-finals showed the same two in the same position, Merritt .03 faster than Wariner.

Wariner started fast in the final: running in lane 7, he caught up with Martyn Rooney to his outside making up the stagger before the 200 mark. Further outside but more difficult to calculate, David Neville was also out fast, while Merritt was even relative to the stagger against Chris Brown in lanes 4 and 5. Around the final turn Merritt separated from the others and the three Americans were ahead, with Neville in first as the turn was ending. Once they hit the straightaway, it was Merritt who had the speed, sprinting away with a high knee action that increased his gap over Wariner and Neville. Wariner had no answer, Neville looked depleted, while Brown was steadily gaining. Merritt sped away to a personal best 43.75, Wariner gave up the chase and jogged across the finish line in second, barely ahead of Brown, who looked like he had passed Neville. In the last two steps, Neville leant forward and fell right at the finish line, his hands technically crossing the line ahead of Wariner. But it is the torso that counts and Neville's body crossed the line in third, .04 ahead of Brown and .06 behind Wariner. Merritt had gained just shy of a full second on Wariner over the last 90 metres for the win. Neville completed an American sweep of the event.

== Background ==
This was the 26th appearance of the event, which is one of 12 athletics events to have been held at every Summer Olympics. Four of the finalists from 2004 returned: gold medalist Jeremy Wariner of the United States, fourth-place finisher Alleyne Francique of Grenada, seventh-place finisher Leslie Djhone of France, and eight-place finisher Michael Blackwood of Jamaica. Wariner also won the 2005 and 2007 world championships, but teammate LaShawn Merritt (runner-up at the 2007 worlds) had beaten Wariner twice in 2008 (including the U.S. Olympic trials). The two were heavy favorites over a field without other significant challengers.

The People's Republic of China, the Czech Republic, São Tomé and Príncipe, and San Marino appeared in this event for the first time. The United States made its 25th appearance, most of any nation, having missed only the boycotted 1980 Games.

== Qualification ==
Each National Olympic Committee (NOC) was able to enter up to three entrants providing they had met the A qualifying standard (45.55) in the qualifying period (1 January 2007 to 23 July 2008). NOCs were also permitted to enter one athlete providing he had met the B standard (45.95) in the same qualifying period.

== Competition format ==
The competition used the three-round format introduced in 2004. The "fastest loser" system, introduced in 1964, was used for the first round and semifinals. There were 7 first-round heats, each with 8 runners (before a withdrawal reduced one heat to 7). The top three runners in each heat advanced, along with the next three fastest overall. The 24 semifinalists were divided into 3 heats of 8 runners each. The top two runners in each semifinal heat and the next two fastest overall advanced, making an eight-man final.

== Records ==
Prior to this competition, the existing world and Olympic records were as follows:

World record	Michael Johnson (USA)	43.18	Seville, Spain	26 August 1999
Olympic record	Michael Johnson (USA)	43.49	Atlanta, United States	29 July 1996
World Leading	Jeremy Wariner (USA)	43.86	Paris, France	18 July 2008

No new world or Olympic records were set for this event.

The following national records were established during the competition:

Nation	Athlete	Round	Time
Virgin Islands	Tabarie Henry	Heat 7	45.36
Belgium	Kévin Borlée	Semifinal 1	44.88
Costa Rica	Nery Brenes	Semifinal 1	44.94
Virgin Islands	Tabarie Henry	Semifinal 1	45.19

== Schedule ==
Since 1984, all rounds have been held on separate days.

All times are China Standard Time (UTC+8)

Date	Time	Round
Monday, 18 August 2008	09:00	Round 1
Tuesday, 19 August 2008	21:45	Semifinals
Thursday, 21 August 2008	21:20	Final

== Results ==
=== Round 1 ===
The first round was held on 18 August. The first three runners of each heat (Q) plus the next three overall fastest runners (q) qualified for the semifinals.

==== Heat 1 ====
Rank	Lane	Athlete	Nation	Reaction	Time	Notes
1	4	Leslie Djhone	France	0.190	45.12	Q
2	5	David Neville	United States	0.189	45.22	Q
3	6	William Collazo	Cuba	0.180	45.37	Q, SB
4	8	Kévin Borlée	Belgium	0.149	45.43	q
~~5~~	9	Denis Alekseyev	Russia	0.299	~~45.52~~	DSQ
6	3	Young Talkmore Nyongani	Zimbabwe	0.249	45.89	
7	7	Eric Milazar	Mauritius	0.209	46.06	
8	2	Gakologelwang Masheto	Botswana	0.183	46.29	SB

==== Heat 2 ====
Rank	Lane	Athlete	Nation	Reaction	Time	Notes
1	6	Chris Brown	Bahamas	0.205	44.79	Q
2	7	Joel Milburn	Australia	0.155	44.80	Q, PB
3	4	Johan Wissman	Sweden	0.229	44.81	Q, SB
4	5	Gary Kikaya	Democratic Republic of the Congo	0.184	44.89	q, SB
5	8	Sanjay Ayre	Jamaica	0.177	45.66	
6	9	Arismendy Peguero	Dominican Republic	0.236	46.28	
7	3	Ivano Bucci	San Marino	0.209	48.54	SB
8	2	Liu Xiaosheng	China	0.245	53.11	

==== Heat 3 ====
Rank	Lane	Athlete	Nation	Reaction	Time	Notes
1	8	Nery Brenes	Costa Rica	0.196	45.36	Q
2	3	James Godday	Nigeria	0.200	45.49	Q
3	9	Andretti Bain	Bahamas	0.225	45.96	Q
4	7	Niko Verekauta	Fiji	0.161	46.32	SB
5	6	Fernando de Almeida	Brazil	0.158	46.60	
6	2	Lewis Banda	Zimbabwe	0.244	46.76	
7	4	Vincent Mumo Kiilu	Kenya	0.212	46.79	
8	5	Nagmeldin Ali Abubakr	Sudan	0.247	47.12	

==== Heat 4 ====
Rank	Lane	Athlete	Nation	Reaction	Time	Notes
1	7	Martyn Rooney	Great Britain	0.207	45.00	Q
2	8	Sean Wroe	Australia	0.182	45.17	Q, PB
3	5	Ricardo Chambers	Jamaica	0.211	45.22	Q
4	3	Erison Hurtault	Dominica	0.246	46.10	
5	9	Andrés Silva	Uruguay	0.265	46.34	
6	2	Rudolf Götz	Czech Republic	0.157	46.38	
7	6	Yuzo Kanemaru	Japan	0.225	46.39	
—	4	California Molefe	Botswana	—	DNS	

==== Heat 5 ====
Rank	Lane	Athlete	Nation	Reaction	Time	Notes
1	2	LaShawn Merritt	United States	0.214	44.96	Q
2	7	Saul Weigopwa	Nigeria	0.172	45.19	Q
3	8	Claudio Licciardello	Italy	0.186	45.25	Q, PB
4	3	Jonathan Borlée	Belgium	0.225	45.25	q, PB
5	6	Ato Modibo	Trinidad and Tobago	0.195	45.63	
6	9	Alleyne Francique	Grenada	0.215	46.15	
7	5	Geiner Mosquera	Colombia	0.268	46.59	
8	4	Siraj Williams	Liberia	0.288	47.89	

==== Heat 6 ====
Rank	Lane	Athlete	Nation	Reaction	Time	Notes
1	7	Andrew Steele	Great Britain	0.248	44.94	Q, PB
2	5	Renny Quow	Trinidad and Tobago	0.266	45.13	Q
3	6	Michael Mathieu	Bahamas	0.193	45.17	Q, PB
4	8	Michael Blackwood	Jamaica	0.204	45.56	
5	2	Tyler Christopher	Canada	0.172	45.67	
6	3	Joel Phillip	Grenada	0.198	46.30	
7	9	Félix Martínez	Puerto Rico	0.347	46.46	
8	4	Daniel Dąbrowski	Poland	0.260	47.83	

==== Heat 7 ====
Rank	Lane	Athlete	Nation	Reaction	Time	Notes
1	9	Jeremy Wariner	United States	0.253	45.23	Q
2	6	Tabarie Henry	Virgin Islands	0.165	45.36	Q, NR
3	2	Cedric van Branteghem	Belgium	0.203	45.54	Q
4	4	David Gillick	Ireland	0.275	45.83	
5	5	Maksim Dyldin	Russia	0.194	46.03	
6	3	Myhaylo Knysh	Ukraine	0.260	46.28	
7	7	Mathieu Gnanligo	Benin	0.207	47.10	
8	8	Naiel Santiago d'Almeida	São Tomé and Príncipe	0.178	49.08	

=== Semifinals ===
The semifinals were held on 19 August 2008.

==== Semifinal 1 ====
The first semifinal was held at 21:45.

Rank	Lane	Athlete	Nation	Reaction	Time	Notes
1	6	Jeremy Wariner	United States	0.224	44.15	Q
2	5	Chris Brown	Bahamas	0.244	44.59	Q
3	6	Kévin Borlée	Belgium	0.162	44.88	NR
4	7	Nery Brenes	Costa Rica	0.169	44.94	NR
5	4	Saul Weigopwa	Nigeria	0.168	45.02	SB
6	2	William Collazo	Cuba	0.191	45.06	PB
7	8	Tabarie Henry	Virgin Islands	0.165	45.19	NR
8	2	Claudio Licciardello	Italy	0.259	45.64	

==== Semifinal 2 ====
The second semifinal was held at 21:52.

Rank	Lane	Athlete	Nation	Reaction	Time	Notes
1	6	Leslie Djhone	France	0.159	44.79	Q, SB
2	4	David Neville	United States	0.190	44.91	Q
3	5	Joel Milburn	Australia	0.187	45.06	
4	9	Ricardo Chambers	Jamaica	0.220	45.09	
5	3	Jonathan Borlée	Belgium	0.191	45.11	PB
6	8	James Godday	Nigeria	0.185	45.24	
7	2	Andretti Bain	Bahamas	0.196	45.52	
8	7	Andrew Steele	Great Britain	0.216	45.59	

==== Semifinal 3 ====
The third semifinal was held at 21:59.

Rank	Lane	Athlete	Nation	Reaction	Time	Notes
1	7	LaShawn Merritt	United States	0.187	44.12	Q
2	6	Martyn Rooney	Great Britain	0.126	44.60	Q, PB
3	8	Johan Wissman	Sweden	0.211	44.64	q, SB
4	5	Renny Quow	Trinidad and Tobago	0.204	44.82	q, PB
5	2	Gary Kikaya	Democratic Republic of the Congo	0.187	44.94	
6	9	Michael Mathieu	Bahamas	0.203	45.56	
7	4	Sean Wroe	Australia	0.205	45.56	
8	3	Cedric van Branteghem	Belgium	0.199	45.81	

=== Final ===
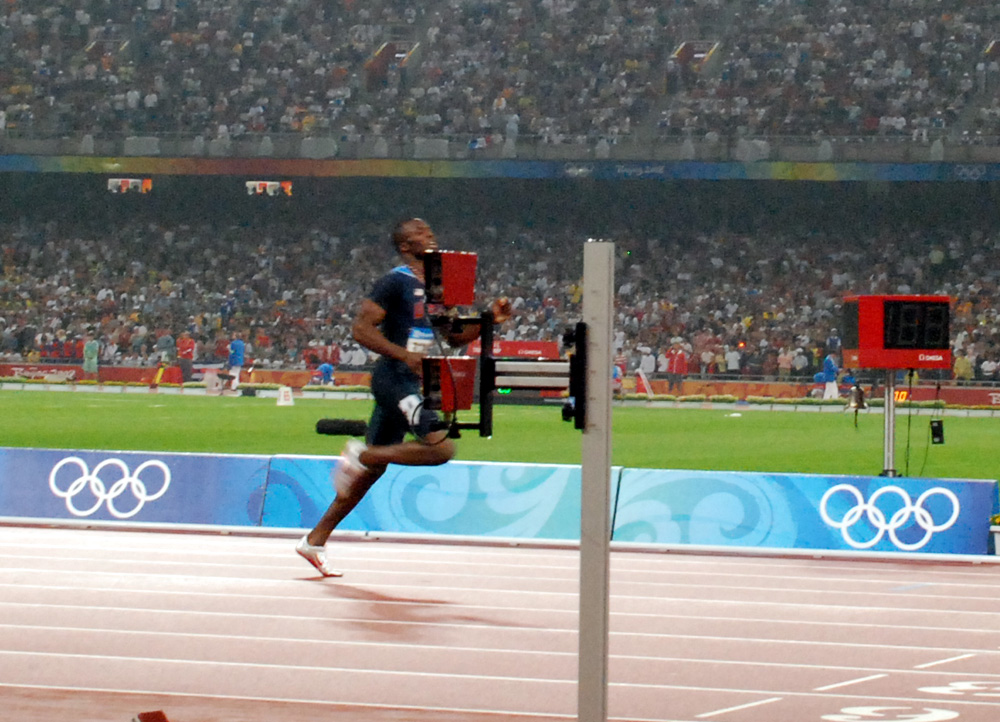
LaShawn Merritt won by a margin of almost a second.

Wariner slowed after Merritt started pulling away from him in the final straight and it became clear that Wariner could not keep pace with Merritt. This resulted in Merritt winning by 0.99 seconds, officially the largest margin of victory in a 400 metres final since 1896 (1.0 seconds).

Rank	Lane	Athlete	Nation	Reaction	Time	Notes
1st place, gold medalist(s)	4	LaShawn Merritt	United States	0.318	43.75	PB
2nd place, silver medalist(s)	7	Jeremy Wariner	United States	0.209	44.74	
3rd place, bronze medalist(s)	9	David Neville	United States	0.293	44.80	
4	5	Chris Brown	Bahamas	0.231	44.84	
5	6	Leslie Djhone	France	0.164	45.11	
6	8	Martyn Rooney	Great Britain	0.208	45.12	
7	2	Renny Quow	Trinidad and Tobago	0.201	45.22	
8	3	Johan Wissman	Sweden	0.218	45.39	
