= 2009 World Championships in Athletics – Men's 400 metres =

The men's 400 metres at the 2009 World Championships in Athletics was held at the Olympic Stadium on 18, 19 and 21 August. The winning margin was 0.54 seconds.

The United States had a strong tradition in the event, with an American topping the Olympic 400 m podium every time since the 1988 Olympics. Similar to the 2007 World Championships, Jeremy Wariner and LaShawn Merritt were the clear favourites. However, on this occasion, recent form favoured the Olympic champion Merritt instead of the reigning world champion Wariner. Both Americans were undefeated that season but Merritt held the world-leading time of 44.50 seconds. A gold or silver medallist outside of these two competitors seemed unlikely; Bahamian Chris Brown, Irishman David Gillick, Frenchman Leslie Djhone and the other two runners from the United States (Gil Roberts and Lionel Larry) were seen to be capable of a bronze at best.

On the first day, Ramon Miller surprised as the fastest qualifier in the heats, scoring a new personal best of 45 seconds. Tabarie Henry, Djhone and Renny Quow were the next fastest, and African record holder Gary Kikaya was most high-profile casualty of the first round, having been disqualified for a lane infraction.

== Medalists ==
Gold	Silver	Bronze
LaShawn Merritt; United States	Jeremy Wariner; United States	Renny Quow; Trinidad and Tobago

== Records ==
Prior to the competition, the established records were as follows.

World record	Michael Johnson (USA)	43.18	Seville, Spain	26 August 1999
Championship record	Michael Johnson (USA)	43.18	Seville, Spain	26 August 1999
World Leading	LaShawn Merritt (USA)	44.50	Baie-Mahault, France	3 July 2009
African record	Gary Kikaya (COD)	44.10	Stuttgart, Germany	9 September 2006
Asian record	Mohamed Amer Al-Malky (OMA)	44.56	Budapest, Hungary	12 August 1988
North American record	Michael Johnson (USA)	43.18	Seville, Spain	26 August 1999
South American record	Sanderlei Parrela (BRA)	44.29	Seville, Spain	26 August 1999
European record	Thomas Schönlebe (GDR)	44.33	Rome, Italy	3 September 1987
Oceanian record	Darren Clark (AUS)	44.38	Seoul, South Korea	26 September 1988

== Qualification standards ==
A time	B time
45.55	45.95

== Schedule ==
Date	Time	Round
August 18, 2009	11:05	Heats
August 19, 2009	18:15	Semifinals
August 21, 2009	21:20	Final

== Results ==
=== Heats ===
Qualification: First 3 in each heat(Q) and the next 3 fastest(q) advance to the semifinals.

Rank	Heat	Name	Nationality	Time	Notes
1	5	Ramon Miller	Bahamas	45.00	Q, PB
2	7	Tabarie Henry	U.S. Virgin Islands	45.14	Q
3	5	Leslie Djhone	France	45.20	Q
4	2	Renny Quow	Trinidad and Tobago	45.21	Q
5	4	LaShawn Merritt	United States	45.23	Q
6	7	Sean Wroe	Australia	45.31	Q
7	4	John Steffensen	Australia	45.37	Q
8	7	Martyn Rooney	Great Britain & N.I.	45.45	Q
9	1	Robert Tobin	Great Britain & N.I.	45.50	Q
10	2	William Collazo	Cuba	45.52	Q
11	3	Chris Brown	Bahamas	45.53	Q
12	6	Jeremy Wariner	United States	45.54	Q
12	1	David Gillick	Ireland	45.54	Q
12	3	Michael Bingham	Great Britain & N.I.	45.54	Q
15	1	Rabah Yousif	Sudan	45.55	Q, PB
15	7	Erison Hurtault	Dominica	45.55	q, SB
17	3	Joel Milburn	Australia	45.56	Q, SB
17	7	Mohamed Ashour Khouaja	Libya	45.56	q, NR
19	6	Ricardo Chambers	Jamaica	45.57	Q
20	2	Kevin Borlée	Belgium	45.61	Q
21	1	Lionel Larry	United States	45.64	q
22	2	Marcin Marciniszyn	Poland	45.77	SB
23	5	Johan Wissman	Sweden	45.83	Q
24	4	Matteo Galvan	Italy	45.86	Q, PB
25	5	Maksim Dyldin	Russia	45.91	
26	1	Young Talkmore Nyongani	Zimbabwe	45.92	
27	1	Cédric Van Branteghem	Belgium	45.94	
28	4	Héctor Carrasquillo	Puerto Rico	46.11	
29	2	Arismendy Peguero	Dominican Republic	46.13	
30	6	Teddy Venel	France	46.16	Q
31	3	Eric Milazar	Mauritius	46.39	
32	5	Gil Roberts	United States	46.41	
33	7	Saul Weigopwa	Nigeria	46.42	
34	3	Isaac Makwala	Botswana	46.45	
35	4	Alvin Harrison	Dominican Republic	46.67	
36	3	Nagmeldin Ali Abubakr	Sudan	46.48	
37	1	Hideyuki Hirose	Japan	46.80	
38	6	Yuzo Kanemaru	Japan	46.83	
39	7	Rondell Bartholomew	Grenada	46.85	
40	3	Andrés Silva	Uruguay	46.86	
41	2	Mathieu Gnanligo	Benin	47.00	SB
42	6	Yousef Ahmed Masrahi	Saudi Arabia	47.03	
43	5	Mark Kiprotich Muttai	Kenya	47.04	
44	2	Nelson Stone	Papua New Guinea	47.13	
45	6	Pieter Smith	South Africa	48.14	
46	5	Naiel d'Almeida	São Tomé and Príncipe	49.47	
47	7	Moumouni Kimba	Niger	50.93	PB
48	3	Zaw Win Thet	Myanmar	51.41	PB
	2	Michael Mathieu	Bahamas	DSQ	
	4	Gary Kikaya	DR Congo	DSQ	
	4	Yannick Fonsat	France	DNS	
	5	James Godday	Nigeria	DNS	
	6	Nery Brenes	Costa Rica	DNS	

Key: NR = National record, PB = Personal best, Q = qualification by place in heat, q = qualification by overall place, SB = Seasonal best

=== Semifinals ===
First 2 in each semifinal(Q) and the next 2 fastest(q) advance to the final.

Rank	Heat	Name	Nationality	Time	Notes
1	2	LaShawn Merritt	United States	44.37	Q, WL
2	2	Renny Quow	Trinidad and Tobago	44.53	Q, PB
3	1	Jeremy Wariner	United States	44.69	Q
4	1	Michael Bingham	Great Britain & N.I.	44.74	Q, PB
5	1	Leslie Djhone	France	44.80	q, SB
6	1	David Gillick	Ireland	44.88	q
7	2	William Collazo	Cuba	44.93	
8	3	Chris Brown	Bahamas	44.95	Q
9	3	Tabarie Henry	U.S. Virgin Islands	44.97	Q
10	1	Ramon Miller	Bahamas	44.99	PB
11	3	Ricardo Chambers	Jamaica	45.13	SB
12	3	Kevin Borlée	Belgium	45.28	SB
13	2	Sean Wroe	Australia	45.32	
14	3	John Steffensen	Australia	45.50	
15	2	Erison Hurtault	Dominica	45.59	
16	2	Rabah Yousif	Sudan	45.63	
17	3	Lionel Larry	United States	45.85	
18	3	Robert Tobin	Great Britain & N.I.	45.90	
19	2	Martyn Rooney	Great Britain & N.I.	45.98	
20	1	Joel Milburn	Australia	46.06	
21	2	Teddy Venel	France	46.30	
22	1	Mohamed Ashour Khouaja	Libya	46.43	
23	3	Matteo Galvan	Italy	46.87	
	1	Johan Wissman	Sweden	DNS	

=== Final ===
Rank	Name	Nationality	Time	Notes
1st place, gold medalist(s)	LaShawn Merritt	United States	44.06	WL
2nd place, silver medalist(s)	Jeremy Wariner	United States	44.60	SB
3rd place, bronze medalist(s)	Renny Quow	Trinidad and Tobago	45.02	
4	Tabarie Henry	U.S. Virgin Islands	45.42	
5	Chris Brown	Bahamas	45.47	
6	David Gillick	Ireland	45.53	
7	Michael Bingham	Great Britain & N.I.	45.56	
8	Leslie Djhone	France	45.90	
