= 2008 African Championships in Athletics – Men's 400 metres =

The men's 400 metres event at the 2008 African Championships in Athletics was held at the Addis Ababa Stadium on April 30–May 2.

== Medalists ==
Gold	Silver	Bronze
Nagmeldin Ali Abubakr; Sudan	Isaac Makwala; Botswana	James Godday; Nigeria

== Results ==
=== Heats ===
Qualification: First 4 of each heat (Q) and the next 4 fastest (q) qualified for the semifinals.

Rank	Heat	Name	Nationality	Time	Notes
1	4	Nagmeldin Ali Abubakr	Sudan	46.54	Q
2	2	Isaac Makwala	Botswana	47.00	Q
3	4	Eric Milazar	Mauritius	47.02	Q
4	1	James Godday	Nigeria	47.03	Q
5	3	Mathieu Gnanligo	Benin	47.10	Q
6	5	Sibusiso Sishi	South Africa	47.15	Q
7	5	Sofiane Labidi	Tunisia	47.31	Q
8	5	Noah Akwu	Nigeria	47.38	Q
9	1	Thomas Musembi	Kenya	47.44	Q
10	4	Ofentse Mogawane	South Africa	47.46	Q
11	1	Pieter Smith	South Africa	47.57	Q
12	2	Nouha Badji	Senegal	47.67	Q
13	5	Ompehmetse Mokgadi	Botswana	47.81	Q
14	3	Mohamed Amin Guezmil	Tunisia	47.81	Q
15	4	Marouane Maadadi	Morocco	47.86	Q
16	5	Rabah Yousif	Sudan	47.87	q
17	2	Saul Weipogwa	Nigeria	47.94	Q
18	1	Awad El Karim Makki	Sudan	48.55	Q
19	3	Bereket Desta	Ethiopia	48.64	Q
20	2	George Kwmoba	Kenya	48.71	Q
21	1	Lukungu Waiswa	Uganda	48.78	q
22	4	Emmanuel Simpson	Ghana	49.21	q
23	5	Issah Awudu	Ghana	49.24	q
24	3	Mamadou Gueye	Senegal	49.32	Q
25	2	Zemenu Kassa	Ethiopia	49.42	
26	1	Fernando Augustin	Mauritius	49.44	
27	4	Anteneh Getachew	Ethiopia	49.53	
28	2	Jean François Degrace	Mauritius	49.76	
29	4	Houssein Nour Ali	Djibouti	50.45	NR
30	2	Abdalla Mohamed Hussein	Somalia	51.97	
31	3	Nathan Kpebah	Ghana	52.49	
32	3	Emmanuel Ntakiyimana	Rwanda	52.92	
33	3	Mahamat Kadre Moussa	Chad	54.49	
	1	Etienne Gashagaza	Rwanda	DNS	
	3	Gary Kikaya	Democratic Republic of the Congo	DNS	

=== Semifinals ===
Qualification: First 2 of each semifinal (Q) and the next 2 fastest (q) qualified for the final.

Rank	Heat	Name	Nationality	Time	Notes
1	1	Mathieu Gnanligo	Benin	45.88	Q, NR
2	1	James Godday	Nigeria	46.11	Q
3	2	Sibusiso Sishi	South Africa	46.21	Q
4	2	Isaac Makwala	Botswana	46.28	Q
5	3	Nagmeldin Ali Abubakr	Sudan	46.45	Q
6	3	Eric Milazar	Mauritius	46.48	Q
7	2	Thomas Musembi	Kenya	46.50	q
8	1	Nouha Badji	Senegal	46.58	q, PB
9	1	Pieter Smith	South Africa	46.64	
10	3	Ofentse Mogawane	South Africa	47.01	
11	1	Mohamed Amin Guezmil	Tunisia	47.17	
12	2	Noah Akwu	Nigeria	47.17	
13	1	Rabah Yousif	Sudan	47.22	
14	3	George Kwmoba	Kenya	47.44	
15	1	Ompehmetse Mokgadi	Botswana	47.53	
16	2	Bereket Desta	Ethiopia	47.56	
17	3	Marouane Maadadi	Morocco	48.05	
18	2	Awad El Karim Makki	Sudan	48.10	
19	2	Mamadou Gueye	Senegal	48.20	
20	1	Lukungu Waiswa	Uganda	48.63	
21	3	Issah Awudu	Ghana	49.20	
22	2	Emmanuel Simpson	Ghana	49.36	
	3	Sofiane Labidi	Tunisia	DNF	
	3	Saul Weipogwa	Nigeria	DNS	

=== Final ===
Rank	Lane	Name	Nationality	Time	Notes
1st place, gold medalist(s)	3	Nagmeldin Ali Abubakr	Sudan	45.64	
2nd place, silver medalist(s)	8	Isaac Makwala	Botswana	45.64	
3rd place, bronze medalist(s)	6	James Godday	Nigeria	45.77	
4	5	Sibusiso Sishi	South Africa	45.84	
5	7	Eric Milazar	Mauritius	45.96	
6	2	Thomas Musembi	Kenya	46.11	
7	4	Mathieu Gnanligo	Benin	46.19	
8	1	Nouha Badji	Senegal	48.00	
