= 2008 African Championships in Athletics – Men's 4 × 400 metres relay =

The men's 4 x 400 metres relay at the 2008 African Championships in Athletics was held on May 3–4.

== Medalists ==
Gold	Silver	Bronze
South Africa; Pieter Smith; Ockert Cilliers; Sibusiso Sishi; L.J. van Zyl; Ofentse Mogawane*	Sudan; Rabah Yousif; Nagmeldin Ali Abubakr; Ismail Ahmed Ismail; Abubaker Kaki; Awad El Karim Makki*	Senegal; Mamadou Kasse Hanne; El Hadj Seth Mbow; Mamadou Gueye; Nouha Badji

* Athletes who participated in heats only.

== Results ==
=== Heats ===
Qualification: First 3 teams of each heat (Q) plus the next 2 fastest (q) qualified for the final.

Rank	Heat	Nation	Athletes	Time	Notes
1	2	South Africa	Pieter Smith, Ofentse Mogawane, Ockert Cilliers, L.J. van Zyl	3:05.57	Q
2	2	Botswana	Ompehmetse Mokgadi, Isaac Makwala, Onalenna Baloyi, Zacharia Kamberuka	3:06.51	Q
3	2	Mauritius	Jean François Degrace, Fernando Augustin, Eric Milazar, Antonio Vieillesse	3:07.48	Q
4	2	Ethiopia	Zemenu Kassa, Anteneh Getachew, Tamrat Tekle, Bereket Desta	3:08.18	q
5	1	Nigeria	Noah Akwu, Victor Isaiah, Segun Ogunkole, James Godday	3:08.35	Q
6	2	Kenya	Julius Bungei, Thomas Musembi, Jackson Kivuva, George Kwmoba	3:08.44	q
7	1	Senegal	Mamadou Kasse Hanne, Nouha Badji, Mamadou Gueye, El Hadj Seth Mbow	3:08.51	Q
8	1	Sudan	Rabah Yousif, Ismail Ahmed Ismail, Awad El Karim Makki, Abubaker Kaki	3:08.88	Q
9	2	Ghana	Emmanuel Simpson, Issah Awudu, Alexander Atiso, Nathan Kpebah	3:13.81	
10	1	Rwanda	Etienne Gashagaza, Moussa Bizimana, Innocent Hakuzimana, Emmanuel Ntakiyimana	3:23.60	
11	1	Chad	Mahamat Kadre Moussa, Albeine Abbo Abdallah, Bourma Malato Ouya, Brahim Ouaddai	3:28.43	
12	2	Democratic Republic of the Congo	Fidel Kitenge, Bob Nyamale, Papy Kibambe, Hugues Tshiynga	3:31.27	
13	1	Somalia	Abdalla Mohamed Hussein, Mohamed Ali Mohamed, Mohamed Ahmed Omar, Abdinasir Said Ibrahim	3:34.78	
	1	Cameroon	Joseph Ndongo Abomo, Serge Tcheuko, Idrissa Adam, François Belinga	DNF	
	2	Morocco	Hicham Frindi, Abdelkerim Khoudri, Marouane Maadadi, Younés Belkaifa	DNF	

=== Final ===
Rank	Nation	Competitors	Time	Notes
1st place, gold medalist(s)	South Africa	Pieter Smith, Ockert Cilliers, Sibusiso Sishi, L.J. van Zyl	3:03.58	
2nd place, silver medalist(s)	Sudan	Rabah Yousif, Nagmeldin Ali Abubakr, Ismail Ahmed Ismail, Abubaker Kaki	3:04.00	
3rd place, bronze medalist(s)	Senegal	Mamadou Kasse Hanne, El Hadj Seth Mbow, Mamadou Gueye, Nouha Badji	3:05.93	
4	Botswana	Ompehmetse Mokgadi, Zacharia Kamberuka, Fanuel Kenosi, Isaac Makwala	3:06.54	
5	Nigeria	Noah Akwu, Victor Isaiah, Edu Nkame, James Godday	3:06.94	
6	Kenya	Julius Bungei, Thomas Musembi, Jackson Kivuva, George Kwmoba	3:06.95	
7	Mauritius	Jean François Degrace, Fernando Augustin, Eric Milazar, Antonio Vieillesse	3:07.60	
8	Ethiopia	Zemenu Kassa, Anteneh Getachew, Tamrat Tekle, Bereket Desta	3:07.71	
