= 2004 World Junior Championships in Athletics – Men's 400 metres =

The men's 400 metres event at the 2004 World Junior Championships in Athletics was held in Grosseto, Italy, at Stadio Olimpico Carlo Zecchini on 13, 14 and 15 July.

== Medalists ==
Gold	LaShawn Merritt; United States
Silver	Nagmeldin Ali Abubaker; Sudan
Bronze	Obakeng Ngwigwa; Botswana

== Results ==
=== Final ===
15 July

Rank	Name	Nationality	Time	Notes
1st place, gold medalist(s)	LaShawn Merritt	United States	45.25	
2nd place, silver medalist(s)	Nagmeldin Ali Abubaker	Sudan	45.97	
3rd place, bronze medalist(s)	Obakeng Ngwigwa	Botswana	45.97	
4	Valentin Kruglyakov	Russia	46.40	
5	Serdar Tamac	Turkey	46.63	
6	Sean Wroe	Australia	46.84	
7	Keith Hinnant	United States	46.88	
8	Paulo Orlando	Brazil	46.95	

=== Semifinals ===
14 July

==== Semifinal 1 ====
Rank	Name	Nationality	Time	Notes
1	LaShawn Merritt	United States	45.84	Q
2	Nagmeldin Ali Abubaker	Sudan	45.99	Q
3	Andrés Rodríguez	Panama	47.42	
4	Michael Gardener	Jamaica	47.49	
5	Manoi Pushpa Kumara	Sri Lanka	47.65	
6	Andretti Bain	Bahamas	47.86	
7	Ruaan Grobler	South Africa	49.26	
	Renny Quow	Trinidad and Tobago	DQ	IAAF rule 163.3

==== Semifinal 2 ====
Rank	Name	Nationality	Time	Notes
1	Obakeng Ngwigwa	Botswana	46.64	Q
2	Sean Wroe	Australia	46.80	Q
3	Keith Hinnant	United States	46.93	q
4	Richard Buck	United Kingdom	47.18	
5	Kazunori Ota	Japan	47.40	
6	Damian Kempa	Poland	47.62	
7	Claudio Licciardello	Italy	48.19	
8	Yudai Sasaki	Japan	48.27	

==== Semifinal 3 ====
Rank	Name	Nationality	Time	Notes
1	Valentin Kruglyakov	Russia	46.46	Q
2	Serdar Tamac	Turkey	46.94	Q
3	Paulo Orlando	Brazil	47.02	q
4	Željko Vincek	Croatia	47.08	
5	Cory Innes	New Zealand	47.37	
6	Maksim Aleksandrenko	Russia	47.79	
7	Ben Offereins	Australia	48.25	
	Roger Polydore	Dominica	DNF	

=== Heats ===
13 July

==== Heat 1 ====
Rank	Name	Nationality	Time	Notes
1	Keith Hinnant	United States	46.54	Q
2	Andrés Rodríguez	Panama	47.02	Q
3	Renny Quow	Trinidad and Tobago	47.19	Q
4	Andretti Bain	Bahamas	47.25	q
5	Chris Gebhardt	South Africa	47.58	
6	Morgan Carlington	Jamaica	48.41	
7	Khalid Salem	Saudi Arabia	49.22	
8	Chang Chia-Wei	Chinese Taipei	50.43	

==== Heat 2 ====
Rank	Name	Nationality	Time	Notes
1	Nagmeldin Ali Abubaker	Sudan	46.68	Q
2	Cory Innes	New Zealand	47.31	Q
3	Ben Offereins	Australia	47.54	Q
4	Carlos Pérez	Venezuela	47.68	
5	Teddy Venel	France	47.73	
6	Gopal Khatri Chhetri	Nepal	54.53	

==== Heat 3 ====
Rank	Name	Nationality	Time	Notes
1	Maksim Aleksandrenko	Russia	47.47	Q
2	Kazunori Ota	Japan	47.88	Q
3	Ruaan Grobler	South Africa	48.09	Q
4	Udomsinachi Erete	Nigeria	48.70	
5	Wilson Lukungu Waiswa	Uganda	48.73	
6	Daryl Vassallo	Gibraltar	49.38	
7	Takeshi Fujiwara	El Salvador	49.66	

==== Heat 4 ====
Rank	Name	Nationality	Time	Notes
1	LaShawn Merritt	United States	46.70	Q
2	Sean Wroe	Australia	47.17	Q
3	Damian Kempa	Poland	47.43	Q
4	Roger Polydore	Dominica	47.43	q
5	Cristián Reyes	Chile	48.14	
6	Vasile Bobos	Romania	48.67	
7	Nicholas Mangham	Palau	58.29	

==== Heat 5 ====
Rank	Name	Nationality	Time	Notes
1	Serdar Tamac	Turkey	47.14	Q
2	Manoi Pushpa Kumara	Sri Lanka	47.16	Q
3	Paulo Orlando	Brazil	47.48	Q
4	Lukasz Pryga	Poland	47.93	
5	Antti Toivonen	Finland	48.09	
	Félix Martínez	Puerto Rico	DQ	IAAF rule 163.3

==== Heat 6 ====
Rank	Name	Nationality	Time	Notes
1	Valentin Kruglyakov	Russia	46.48	Q
2	Richard Buck	United Kingdom	47.00	Q
3	Michael Gardener	Jamaica	47.06	Q
4	Claudio Licciardello	Italy	47.35	q
5	Roman Holly	Slovakia	47.74	
6	Frank Puriza	Namibia	48.07	
7	José Eduardo Acevedo	Venezuela	48.95	

==== Heat 7 ====
Rank	Name	Nationality	Time	Notes
1	Obakeng Ngwigwa	Botswana	46.92	Q
2	Željko Vincek	Croatia	47.68	Q
3	Yudai Sasaki	Japan	47.83	Q
4	Mikhail Ratnikov	Belarus	48.06	
5	Mohamed Moussa	Qatar	48.66	
6	Sou Chon Kin	Macau	51.72	

== Participation ==
According to an unofficial count, 47 athletes from 39 countries participated in the event.

- Australia (2)
- Bahamas (1)
- Belarus (1)
- Botswana (1)
- Brazil (1)
- Chile (1)
- Chinese Taipei (1)
- Croatia (1)
- Dominica (1)
- El Salvador (1)
- Finland (1)
- France (1)
- Gibraltar (1)
- Italy (1)
- Jamaica (2)
- Japan (2)
- Macau (1)
- Namibia (1)
- Nepal (1)
- New Zealand (1)
- Nigeria (1)
- Palau (1)
- Panama (1)
- Poland (2)
- Puerto Rico (1)
- Qatar (1)
- Romania (1)
- Russia (2)
- Saudi Arabia (1)
- Slovakia (1)
- South Africa (2)
- Sri Lanka (1)
- Sudan (1)
- Trinidad and Tobago (1)
- Turkey (1)
- Uganda (1)
- United Kingdom (1)
- United States (2)
- Venezuela (2)
