= 2005 African Junior Athletics Championships =

7th African Junior Championships
- Dates: 1 – 4 September
- Host city: Tunis and Radès, Tunisia
- Level: Under-20
- Events: 44

The 2005 African Junior Athletics Championships was the seventh edition of the biennial, continental athletics tournament for African athletes aged 19 years or younger. It was held in the Tunisian cities of Tunis and Radès from 1–4 September. A total of 44 events were contested, 22 by men and 22 by women.

The two cities also played dual hosts to the 2005 Arab Athletics Championships later that same month.

== Medal summary ==
=== Men ===
Event	Gold		Silver		Bronze	
100 metres	Tatenda Gwanzura (ZIM)	10.50	Wetere Galcha (ETH)	10.73	Ben-Youssef Meïté (CIV)	10.74
200 metres	Nagmeldin Ali Abubakr (SUD)	20.95	Ben-Youssef Meïté (CIV)	21.32	Katim Touré (SEN)	21.59
400 metres	Nagmeldin Ali Abubakr (SUD)	46.09	Adam Al-Nour (SUD)	47.76	Habtamu Abeje (ETH)	48.01
800 metres	Geoffrey Kipkoech Rono (KEN)	1:47.10	Samir Khadar (ALG)	1:47.86	Jimmy Adar (UGA)	1:48.79
1500 metres	Geoffrey Kipkoech Rono (KEN)	3:42.76	Kumsa Adugna (ETH)	3:43.72	Remmy Limo Ndiwa (KEN)	3:44.21
5000 metres	Moses Ndiema Masai (KEN)	13:45.15	Mang'ata Ndiwa (KEN)	13:45.37	Tola Bane (ETH)	13:57.67
10,000 metres	Moses Ndiema Masai (KEN)	28:30.27	Hosea Macharinyang (KEN)	28:41.44	Ali Abdosh (ETH)	29:24.14
110 metres hurdles	Ruan de Vries (RSA)	14.12	Seleke Samake (SEN)	14.22	Lehann Fourie (RSA)	14.23
400 metres hurdles	Seleke Samake (SEN)	51.32	Antonio Vieillesse (MRI)	51.53	Johann Hanekom (RSA)	51.86
3000 metres steeplechase	Willy Komen (KEN)	8:35.82	Nahom Mesfin Tariku (ETH)	8:40.01	Ezkyas Sisay (ETH)	8:41.21
4 × 100 m relay	South Africa (RSA); Brendon Elliot Clement; Eugene Renoy Tempies; Ruan de Vries; Lehann Fourie	40.60	Senegal (SEN); Abdourahmane Ndour; Katim Touré; Famara Cisse; Seleke Samake	41.13	Tunisia (TUN); Chouaieb Chelbi; Aymen Ben Ahmed; Mahmoud Hamdi; Mohamed Yassine Trabelsi	41.51
4 × 400 m relay	Sudan (SUD); Adam Al-Nour; Abdel Bashar El-Farzdag; Salih Dar; Nagmeldin Ali Abubaker	3:09.00	Tunisia (TUN); Yassine Assadi; Hichem Saidi; Mohamed Sghaier; Belgacem Hrichi	3:12.43	Senegal (SEN); Cheikh Ahmed Tidiane Ndiaye; Mamadou Hanne; Nouha Badji; Seleke Samake	3:14.43
10,000 metres walk	Ali Amrouch (ALG)	45:31.13	Nourredine Messoussi (TUN)	45:56.99	Amine Djerarfaoui (ALG)	46:35.25
High jump	Kabelo Kgosiemang (BOT)	2.16 m	Karim Lotfy (EGY)	2.16 m	Leendert Johannes Haasbroek (RSA)	2.10 m
Pole vault	Mohamed Abdelatif Djadoun (ALG)	4.60 m	Barend Howell (RSA)	4.60 m	Khelil Ben Chehida (TUN)	4.20 m
Long jump	Mohamed Yassine Chaieb (TUN)	7.49 m (w)	Gui Bertrand Boissy (SEN)	7.04 m	Houssem Maalaoui (TUN)	6.95 m
Triple jump	Okba Ramoul (ALG)	15.60 m	Houssem Maalaoui (TUN)	15.34 m	Chakib Dekhaili (TUN)	15.32 m
Shot put	Mostafa El-Moaty (EGY)	18.26 m	Donovan Snyman (RSA)	17.75 m	Karim Mohamed Sayed (EGY)	17.02 m
Discus throw	Mohamed Wadah Mansour (LBA)	54.52 m	Michael Fawzy Melad (EGY)	52.99 m	Uwe Sauer (RSA)	52.56 m
Hammer throw	Johan Kruger (RSA)	55.02 m	Johannes Conradie (RSA)	53.36 m	Helmi Bahri Gafsi (TUN)	51.42 m
Javelin throw	John Robert Oosthuizen (RSA)	75.94 m	Mohamed Ali Kebabou (TUN)	63.66 m	Fakhri Zouaoui (TUN)	63.01 m
Decathlon	Guillaume Thierry (MRI)	6838 pts	Mathys De Bruin (RSA)	6355 pts	Nabil Ben Abdullah (TUN)	5481 pts

=== Women ===
Event	Gold		Silver		Bronze	
100 metres	Thandi Mngwevu (RSA)	12.08	Nahed Abid (TUN)	12.46	Félicité Traore (BUR)	12.50
200 metres	Nawal El Jack (SUD)	24.07	Arista Hefer (RSA)	24.15	Thandi Mngwevu (RSA)	24.72
400 metres	Nawal El Jack (SUD)	53.94	Ndèye Fatou Soumah (SEN)	56.33	Muna Jabir Adam (SUD)	58.20
800 metres	Lydia Wafula (KEN)	2:02.84	Muna Jabir Adam (SUD)	2:04.24	Chaltu Girma (ETH)	2:04.87
1500 metres	Chahrazad Cheboub (ALG)	4:17.06	Bizunesh Urgesa (ETH)	4:20.70	Emebt Etea (ETH)	4:21.23
3000 metres	Mercy Wanjiku (KEN)	9:14.89	Alemitu Abera (ETH)	9:15.61	Beatrice Chebusit (KEN)	9:16.36
5000 metres	Beatrice Chebusit (KEN)	16:04.10	Esther Chemtai Ndiema (KEN)	16:06.13	Workitu Ayanu (ETH)	16:27.58
100 metres hurdles	Félicité Traore (BUR)	14.31	Christine Ras (RSA)	14.38	Mame Fatou Faye (SEN)	14.59
400 metres hurdles	Nawal El Jack (SUD)	59.72	Mame Fatou Faye (SEN)	61.31	Sondos Idoudi (TUN)	62.26
3000 metres steeplechase	Mercy Wanjiku (KEN)	9:50.63	Mercy Kosgei (KEN)	10:09.78	Muna Durka (SUD)	10:24.39
4 × 100 m relay	Tunisia (TUN); Nahed Abid; Hafsia Hmidi; Sabra Dhaouadi; Amani Khemir	48.20	Sudan (SUD)	48.25	Burkina Faso (BUR); Félicité Traore; Kadidiatou Traoré; Worokia Sanou; Dorothée Zerbo	49.01
4 × 400 m relay	Sudan (SUD); Fayza Omer Jomaa; Muna Jabir Adam; Hind Musa; Nawal El Jack	3:40.24	South Africa (RSA); Arista Hefer; Thandi Mngwevu; Christine Ras; Janine Visser	3:47.39	Senegal (SEN); Mame Fatou Faye; Marietou Badji; Fatoumata Diop; Ndèye Fatou Soumah	3:48.85
10,000 metres walk	Hendrika Botha (RSA)	52:15.22	Bekashign Aynalem (ETH)	52:53.94	Olfa Lafi (TUN)	53:53.19
High jump	Anika Smit (RSA)	1.89 m	Moufida Anine (ALG)	1.70 m	Sabra Ben Saïd (TUN)	1.70 m
Pole vault	Nadia Mabrouk (TUN)	3.30 m	Sonia Halliche (ALG)	3.20 m	Vanisha Nemdharry (MRI)	3.00 m
Long jump	Lindi van Dyk (RSA)	5.80 m	Amani Khemir (TUN)	5.65 m	Nahed Abid (TUN)	5.51 m
Triple jump	Kamilia Sahnoun (ALG)	12.89 m	Mongia Arbi (TUN)	12.53 m	Kadidiatou Traoré (BUR)	12.47 m
Shot put	Marli Knoetze (RSA)	16.93 m	Ghada Ghezal (TUN)	12.97 m	Sara Dardiri (EGY)	10.95 m
Discus throw	Marli Knoetze (RSA)	46.44 m	Sara Dardiri (EGY)	46.11 m	Ghada Ghezal (TUN)	37.48 m
Hammer throw	Eman Al-Ashry (EGY)	54.59 m	Yasmin Ashraf (EGY)	50.76 m	Khedidja Jallouz (TUN)	47.96 m
Javelin throw	Riatha Jacobs (RSA)	47.29 m	Aneen Groenewald (RSA)	44.05 m	Sabiha Mzoughi (TUN)	36.24 m
Heptathlon	Muna Jabir Adam (SUD)	4587 pts	Heike Kotze (RSA)	4541 pts	Marwa Mohamed Naim (EGY)	3972 pts
