= 2010 African Championships in Athletics – Men's 4 × 400 metres relay =

The men's 4 x 400 metres relay at the 2010 African Championships in Athletics was held from July 31 to August 1.

== Medalists ==
Gold	Silver	Bronze
Kenya; Geoffrey Ngeno; Vincent Kiplangat Koskei; Julius Kirwa; Mark Kiprotich Mutai	Botswana; Isaac Makwala; Thapelo Ketlogetswe; Pako Seribe; Obakeng Ngwigwa; Tiroyaone Masake*	Nigeria; Saul Weigopwa; James Godday; Tobi Ogunmola; Isah Salihu

- Runners who participated in the heats only and received medals.

== Results ==
=== Heats ===
Qualification: First 3 teams of each heat (Q) plus the next 2 fastest (q) qualified for the final.

Rank	Heat	Nation	Athletes	Time	Notes
1	1	Kenya	Geoffrey Ngeno, Vincent Kiplangat Koskei, Julius Kirwa, Mark Kiprotich Mutai	3:04.21	Q
2	1	Botswana	Pako Seribe, Isaac Makwala, Tiroyaone Masake, Obakeng Ngwigwa	3:07.71	Q
3	2	Nigeria	Isah Salihu, James Godday, Tobi Ogunmola, Saul Weigopwa	3:08.86	Q
4	1	Sudan	Sadam Koumi, Abubaker Kaki, Hafz Hussein, Rabah Yousif	3:09.20	Q
5	2	Senegal	Mamadou Kasse Hanne, Mor Seck, Amadou Ndiaye, Mamadou Gueye	3:09.87	Q
6	1	Ethiopia	Habtamu Gobe, Hago Tadesse, Zemenu Kassaw, Bereket Desta	3:10.11	q
7	2	Uganda	Anthony Okiror, Ali Ngaimoko, Ramadhan Akula, Emmanuel Tugumisirize	3:10.28	Q
8	1	Tanzania	Augustino Mande, Laurent Masatu, Kassim Hussein Salehe, Frank Martin	3:16.00	q
9	1	Rwanda	Hermas Muvunyi, Emmanuel Ntakirutimana, Thimote Bagina, Moussa Bizimana	3:21.01	NR
10	2	Angola	Nicolau Palanca, Lourenco Bartolo Antonio, Domingos Pascoal Moulho, Manuel Andre Antonio	3:26.47	
	2	Somalia	Abdalla Mohamed Hussein, Abdinaser Said Ibrahim, Nor Osman Nor, Abdishakor Nagea Abdulle	DQ	
	1	DR Congo		DNS	
	2	Ghana		DNS	
	2	Seychelles		DNS	
	2	Zambia		DNS	

=== Final ===
Rank	Nation	Competitors	Time	Notes
1st place, gold medalist(s)	Kenya	Geoffrey Ngeno, Vincent Kiplangat Koskei, Julius Kirwa, Mark Kiprotich Mutai	3:02.96	
2nd place, silver medalist(s)	Botswana	Isaac Makwala, Thapelo Ketlogetswe, Pako Seribe, Obakeng Ngwigwa	3:05.16	
3rd place, bronze medalist(s)	Nigeria	Saul Weigopwa, James Godday, Tobi Ogunmola, Isah Salihu	3:06.53	
4	Sudan	Sadam Koumi, Abubaker Kaki, Hafz Hussein, Rabah Yousif	3:08.52	
5	Senegal	Amadou Ndiaye, Abdourahmane N'Dour, Mor Seck, Mamadou Gueye	3:08.94	
6	Ethiopia	Habtamu Gobe, Hago Tadesse, Bereket Desta, Fikadu Dejene	3:08.96	
7	Uganda	Anthony Okiror, Ali Ngaimoko, Ramadhan Akula, Emmanuel Tugumisirize	3:09.41	
8	Tanzania	Augustino Mande, Laurent Masatu, Kassim Hussein Salehe, Frank Martin	3:16.03	
