= Andrew Rock =

American sprinter (born 1982)

Personal information
- Born: January 23, 1982 (age 44) Marshfield, Wisconsin, U.S.
- Education: Wisconsin–La Crosse
Medal record
Men's athletics
Representing the United States
Olympic Games
| Gold medal – first place | 2004 Athens | 4 × 400 m relay |
World Championships
| Gold medal – first place | 2005 Helsinki | 4 × 400 m relay |
| Silver medal – second place | 2005 Helsinki | 400 m |

Andrew Rock (born January 23, 1982) is an American sprinter who specializes in the 400 meter dash.

== Early career ==
Rock was born in Marshfield, Wisconsin, and grew up in Stratford, Wisconsin, where he graduated from high school in 2000. His high school career concluded at the 2000 Wisconsin State Championships, where he became the first athlete in meet history to win four individual titles at the same championships by winning the 110 m hurdles, 300 m hurdles, 200 m dash, and long jump. Despite this success, he was not a heavily recruited athlete.

Rock attended the University of Wisconsin–La Crosse, where he was a nine-time National Champion and a 17-time All-American. After finishing runner-up seven times between the 2001 and 2002 seasons, Rock hit his stride in 2003 and 2004, winning eight consecutive titles in the 400 m dash and 4 × 400 m relay. Rock holds nine UW–La Crosse records (four individual; five relays) and six WIAC records (three individual; three relays) and was twice named first-team Academic All-American by CoSIDA. In addition to these achievements, Rock claimed the fastest 400 m time in Division III history, running a 44.66 at a USATF meet in Carson, California, thereby announcing his arrival onto the elite track scene. While at UW–La Crosse, Rock was also in integral part of eight team National Championships for the Wisconsin–La Crosse Eagles track team, four NCAA Division III Indoor (2001, 2002, 2003, 2004) and four NCAA Division III Outdoor (2001, 2002, 2003, 2004). Rock turned professional soon after graduating from UW–La Crosse in 2004 with a finance degree by signing a multi-year contract with Adidas.

As of 2026, Rock is head coach of the track and field teams at Bethel University.

== Professional career ==
Rock finished 6th in the 400 m at the 2004 Olympic Trials, earning him a spot in the relay pool for the Olympic Games in Athens, Greece. In the 2004 Olympic Games, he ran for the American 4 × 400 m relay team in the qualifying heats, securing the team a place in the final. The relay took first in the final, securing Rock a gold medal. In the 2005 World Championships in Helsinki, he competed in 400 m and won a silver medal, setting a new personal best of 44.35. Later in the meet, he led off the 4 × 400 m relay team to a World Championship gold medal. Rock followed his 2005 season with a 2006 campaign highlighted by his 400 m win at the AT&T USA Outdoor Championships in Indianapolis.

== Personal bests ==
| Event | Time (seconds) | Place | Date |
|---|---|---|---|
| 200 meters | 20.84 | Stevens Point, Wisconsin, United States | May 5, 2003 |
| 400 meters | 44.35 | Helsinki, Finland | August 12, 2005 |
| 4 × 400 m relay | 2:56.91 – 44.7s (Rock, Brew, Williamson, Wariner) | Helsinki, Finland | August 14, 2005 |

== Career highlights ==
- 2001-2004: 9-time NCAA Division III Champion, 17-time NCAA Division III All-American
- 2004: Olympic 4 × 400 m relay gold medalist, ranked #7 in the United States
- 2005: World Outdoor 400 m silver medalist, World Outdoor 4 × 400 m gold medalist, ranked #2 in the United States and #3 in the World
- 2006: USATF Outdoor Champion, 400 m, ranked #3 in the United States and #4 in the World
- 2007: ranked #7 in the United States

== Coaching career ==
- 2010-2012: Carleton College (Assistant Cross Country and Track Coach)
  - Coached five conference champion sprinters/middle-distance runners
  - Carleton 800 m runners set two new school records
- 2012–present: Bethel University (Head Men's & Women's Track & Field Coach)
  - 2015: Named the Women's Indoor MIAC Coach of the Year
  - 2016: Karl Olsen earned men's outdoor MIAC Elite 22 award
  - 2017: Named the Men's Indoor MIAC Coach of the Year
  - 2017: Men's 4 × 400-meter relay finished runner-up at NCAA national outdoor meet
  - 2017: Bethel men finished third at and MIAC Indoor meet—tied for highest finish in program history
  - 2017: Coached 10 All-Americans
  - 2018: Bethel men finished third at and MIAC Indoor meet—tied for highest finish in program history
  - 2018: Karl Olsen finished as the 400 m runner-up at NCAA national indoor meet
  - 2018: Karl Olsen voted Academic All-American
  - 2018: Annika Halverson voted Academic All-American
  - 2018: Women's 4 × 400-meter relay recorded back-to-back Indoor & Outdoor All-American finishes
  - 2018: Coached 19 All-Americans
  - 2019: Women's 4 × 400-meter relay recorded back-to-back Indoor & Outdoor All-American finishes
  - 2019: Karl Olsen awarded NCAA Post Graduate Scholarship
  - 2019: Carl Klamm runner-up in 400 m at NCAA national outdoor meet
  - 2019: Coached 18 All-Americans
  - 2020: Coached 10 All-Americans
  - 2021: Bethel women finished second at MIAC Outdoor meet—highest finish in program history
  - 2021: Coached 3 All-Americans
  - 2021: Joel Smith runner-up in 400 m Hurdles at NCAA national outdoor meet
  - 2024: Bethel Men & Women winning as a team in MIAC Championships for both Indoor and Outdoor. The first Sweep in program history.
  - 2024: Bethel men finish third at NCAA Championships. Highest in program history.
  - 2024: Bethel men take first in the 4 × 400 m relay at Division III National Championships, the first athletes in school history to win a national title.
  - Coached 82 National Meet Qualifiers and 64 All-Americans, 149 MIAC Champions and 329 MIAC All-Conference winners
  - 47 school records broken since Coach Rock's tenure began in 2013
