= Wariner =

Wariner is a surname. Notable people with the surname include:

- Jeremy Wariner (born 1984), American track and field athlete
- Steve Wariner (born 1954), American singer-songwriter and guitarist
