= Mamadou Gueye (sprinter) =

Senegalese sprinter (born 1986)

Medal record

Men's athletics

African Championships
Bronze medal – third place	2008 Addis Ababa	4×400 m

Jeux de la Francophonie
Gold medal – first place	2009 Beirut	4×400 m

Mamadou Gueye (born 1 April 1986) is a retired Senegalese sprinter who specialized in the 400 metres.

In the 400 metres he finished sixth at the 2003 African Junior Championships and competed at the 2007 All-Africa Games (semi-final), the 2008 African Championships (semi-final), the 2010 African Championships (semi-final) and the 2015 African Games (semi-final).

In the 800 metres he finished eighth at the 2009 Jeux de la Francophonie and competed at the 2013 Jeux de la Francophonie without reaching the final.

In the 4 × 400 metres relay he won a bronze medal at the 2003 African Junior Championships, finished sixth at the 2007 All-Africa Games, won a bronze medal at the 2008 African Championships, a gold medal at the 2009 Jeux de la Francophonie, finished fifth at the 2010 African Championships and sixth at the 2015 African Games.

His personal best time was 46.66 seconds, achieved in July 2009 in Pergine Valsugana.
