= Thapelo Ketlogetswe =

Botswana sprinter (born 1991)

Medal record

Men's athletics

Representing Botswana

African Championships
Silver medal – second place	2010 Nairobi	4×400 m

Thapelo Ketlogetswe (born 12 February 1991) is a Botswana athlete competing primarily in the 400 metres. He participated in the 4 × 400 metres relay at the 2013 World Championships without qualifying for the final.

His personal best in the event is 46.17 seconds set in Orapa in 2011.

== Competition record ==
Year	Competition	Venue	Position	Event	Notes
Representing Botswana
2008	World Junior Championships	Bydgoszcz, Poland	54th (h)	200 m	22.65
2009	Universiade	Belgrade, Serbia	41st (h)	400 m	50.37
2009	African Junior Championships	Bambous, Mauritius	3rd	400 m	47.43
2009	African Junior Championships	Bambous, Mauritius	3rd	4 × 400 m relay	3:15.08
2010	World Indoor Championships	Doha, Qatar	–	4 × 400 m relay	DQ
2010	World Junior Championships	Moncton, Canada	11th (sf)	400 m	47.23
2010	World Junior Championships	Moncton, Canada	7th	4 × 400 m relay	3:10.74
2010	African Championships	Nairobi, Kenya	2nd	4 × 400 m relay	3:05.16
2011	Universiade	Shenzhen, China	7th (h)	400 m	46.72
2011	Universiade	Shenzhen, China	5th	4 × 100 m relay	41.73
2011	Universiade	Shenzhen, China	4th	4 × 400 m relay	3:07.13
2012	World Indoor Championships	Istanbul, Turkey	11th (h)	4 × 400 m relay	3:13.21
2012	African Championships	Porto-Novo, Benin	18th (sf)	400 m	47.96
2013	World Championships	Moscow, Russia	22nd (h)	4 × 400 m relay	3:05.74
