= 2008 African Championships in Athletics – Men's javelin throw =

The men's javelin throw event at the 2008 African Championships in Athletics was held at the Addis Ababa Stadium on May 4.

== Results ==
Rank	Athlete	Nationality	#1	#2	#3	#4	#5	#6	Result	Notes
1st place, gold medalist(s)	Mohamed Ali Kbabou	Tunisia	66.12	69.52	67.21	72.16	74.20	70.13	74.20	PB
2nd place, silver medalist(s)	Kenechukwu Ezeofor	Nigeria	70.04	72.53	70.08	69.45	x	68.09	72.53	PB
3rd place, bronze medalist(s)	Sammy Keskeny	Kenya	67.50	69.84	x	64.74	61.43	64.32	69.84	SB
4	Patrick Kibwota	Uganda	69.70	65.20	66.56	68.29	65.50	65.44	69.70	
5	Waleed Al-Saad	Egypt	68.39	66.38	68.61	65.49	67.47	67.38	68.61	
6	Yves Sambou	Senegal	61.87	67.85	x	65.45	61.62	64.37	67.85	
7	Mitko Tilahun	Ethiopia	58.62	64.76	63.80	61.02	59.57	58.04	64.76	
8	Mohamad Husen	Ethiopia	53.69	61.47	61.82	59.54	62.66	60.63	62.66	
9	Moctar Djigui	Mali	56.87	60.95	61.59				61.59	
10	Anteneh Tamiru	Ethiopia	57.64	57.48	57.18				57.64	
