= Benin at the 2017 World Championships in Athletics =

- WA code: BEN

in London, United Kingdom
- Competitors: 2
- Medals: Gold 0 Silver 0 Bronze 0 Total 0

World Championships in Athletics appearances
- 1983; 1987; 1991; 1993; 1995; 1997; 1999; 2001; 2003; 2005; 2007; 2009; 2011; 2013; 2015; 2017; 2019; 2022; 2023; 2025

Benin competed at the 2017 World Championships in Athletics in London, United Kingdom, 4–13 August 2017.

== Results ==
(q = qualified, NM = no mark, SB = season best)

=== Women ===
Track and road events

Athlete	Event	Heat		Semifinal		Final	
Athlete	Event	Result	Rank	Result	Rank	Result	Rank
Noélie Yarigo	800 metres	2:00.99 SB	8 Q	1:59.74 SB	7	Did not advance	

Combined events – Heptathlon

Athlete	Event	100H	HJ	SP	200 m	LJ	JT	800 m	Final	Rank
Odile Ahouanwanou	Result	13.71	1.74	14.71	24.09	5.92	43.16	2:27.00	6020	19
Odile Ahouanwanou	Points	1020	903	841	972	825	728	731	6020	19
