= LaShawn Merritt =

American sprinter (born 1986)

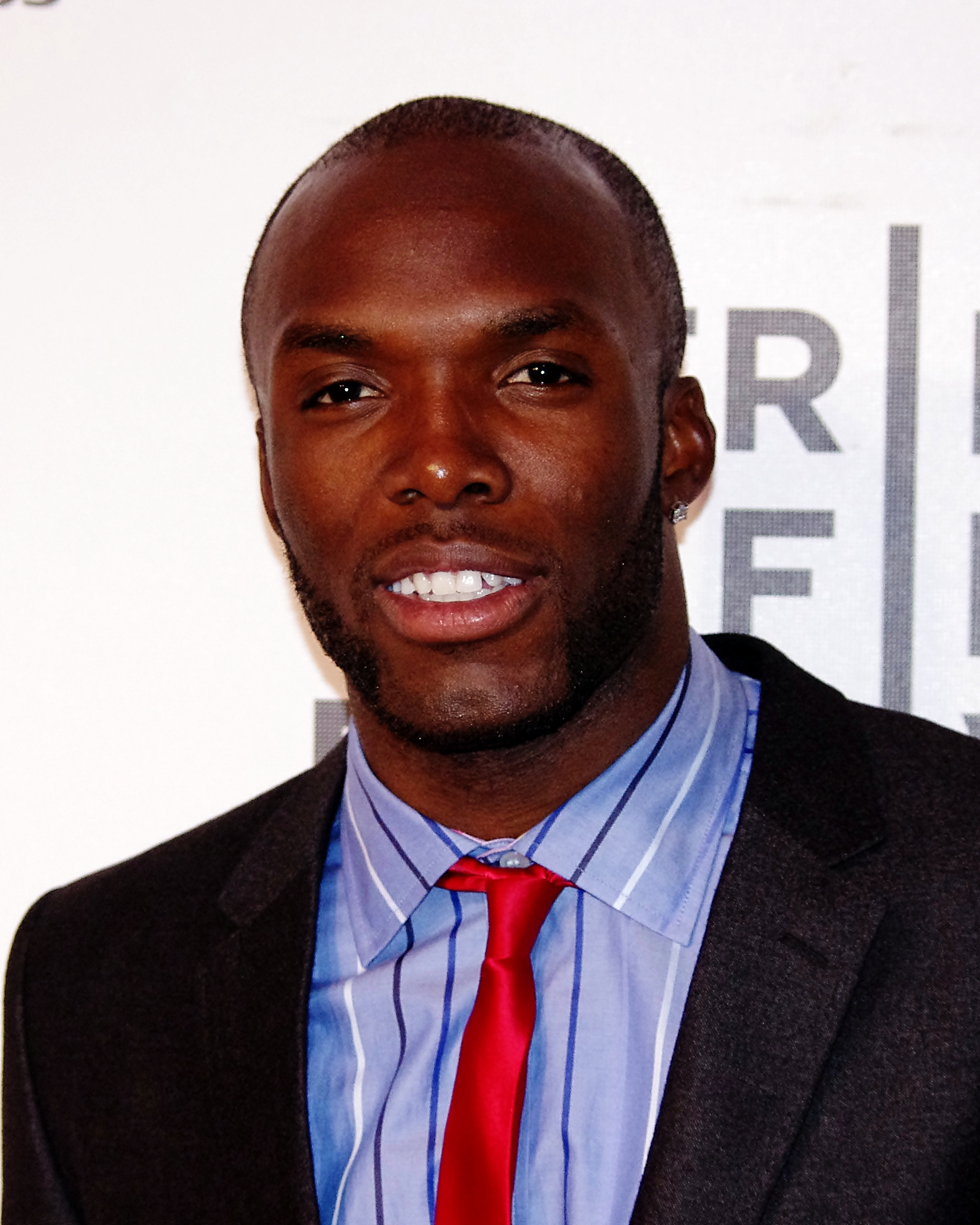
- Merritt at the 2012 Tribeca Film Festival.

Personal information
- Born: June 27, 1986 (age 40) Portsmouth, Virginia, U.S.
- Height: 6 ft 2 in (188 cm)
- Weight: 185 lb (84 kg)

Sport
- Sport: Track and field
- Event: 400 metres
- College team: East Carolina Pirates
- Coached by: Dennis Mitchell
Medal record
Event	1st	2nd	3rd
Olympic Games	3	0	1
World Championships	8	3	0
World Indoor Championships	1	0	0
World Junior Championships	3	0	0
Total	15	3	1
Men's athletics
Representing the United States
Olympic Games
Gold medal – first place	2008 Beijing	400 m
Gold medal – first place	2008 Beijing	4 × 400 m relay
Gold medal – first place	2016 Rio de Janeiro	4 × 400 m relay
Bronze medal – third place	2016 Rio de Janeiro	400 m
World Championships
Gold medal – first place	2005 Helsinki	4 × 400 m relay
Gold medal – first place	2007 Osaka	4 × 400 m relay
Gold medal – first place	2009 Berlin	400 m
Gold medal – first place	2009 Berlin	4 × 400 m relay
Gold medal – first place	2011 Daegu	4 × 400 m relay
Gold medal – first place	2013 Moscow	400 m
Gold medal – first place	2013 Moscow	4 × 400 m relay
Gold medal – first place	2015 Beijing	4 × 400 m relay
Silver medal – second place	2007 Osaka	400 m
Silver medal – second place	2011 Daegu	400 m
Silver medal – second place	2015 Beijing	400 m
World Indoor Championships
Gold medal – first place	2006 Moscow	4 × 400 m relay
World Relay Championships
Gold medal – first place	2014 Nassau	4 × 400 m relay
Gold medal – first place	2015 Nassau	4 × 400 m relay
Gold medal – first place	2017 Nassau	4 × 400 m relay
World Junior Championships
Gold medal – first place	2004 Grosseto	400 m
Gold medal – first place	2004 Grosseto	4 × 100 m relay
Gold medal – first place	2004 Grosseto	4 × 400 m relay
Representing Americas
Continental Cup
Gold medal – first place	2006 Athens	400 m
Gold medal – first place	2006 Athens	4 × 400 m
Gold medal – first place	2014 Marrakesh	400 m
Bronze medal – third place	2014 Marrakesh	4 × 400 m

LaShawn Merritt (born June 27, 1986) is an American retired track and field athlete who competed in sprinting events, specializing in the 400 metres. He is a former Olympic champion over the distance and his personal best of 43.65 seconds makes him the 13th fastest of all time.

Merritt was a successful junior athlete and won the 400 m gold at the 2004 World Junior Championships in Athletics, as well as setting two world junior records in the relays. He became part of the American 4 × 400 meter relay team and helped win the event at the 2006 IAAF World Indoor Championships. He established himself individually in 2007 by winning a silver medal in the 400 m at the 2007 World Championships.

He came out on top of a rivalry with Jeremy Wariner in 2008 by winning in the 2008 Olympic final in a personal best time, and by a record margin of 0.99 secs. He also broke the Olympic record in the relay with the American team, recording the second fastest time ever. Merritt established himself as the World Champion with a win at the 2009 World Championships in Athletics in the 400 m and the 4 × 400 m

== Biography ==
Merritt is a native of Portsmouth, Virginia where he graduated from Woodrow Wilson High School. He spent one year as a college athlete at East Carolina University, signing an endorsement contract with Nike during his first season of indoor track, making him ineligible to compete in an NCAA event. Merritt then transferred to Old Dominion University in Norfolk, Virginia. He studied business administration at Norfolk State University also located in Norfolk.

=== Early career ===
Merritt came to prominence as a junior athlete at the 2004 World Junior Championships in Athletics. He took the gold medal in the 400 meters race and set two junior world records as part of the American 4 × 100 and 4 × 400 meter relay teams. He took part in the 2005 World Championships in Athletics, his first major senior championship, and acted as the relay substitute for the men's 4 × 400 m. He helped the team win their heat and was substituted for Jeremy Wariner for the final, where the American team won the gold medal.

He broke into the senior ranks in 2006, and was selected for the 4 × 400 m relay team for the 2006 IAAF World Indoor Championships. Along with Tyree Washington, Milton Campbell and Wallace Spearmon, he won the World Indoor title in the event. Outdoors, he improved his best to 44.14 seconds for a bronze medal at the 2006 IAAF World Athletics Final and was selected to represent the United States at the 2006 IAAF World Cup, at which he won the 400 m competition.

Prior to the 400 m final at the 2007 World Championships in Athletics in Osaka, Merritt stated his intent to beat all-comers. He achieved his first sub-44 second run, finishing in 43.96, and beat 2000 Olympic champion Angelo Taylor to the line. However, this was not enough to beat the reigning World and Olympic champion Jeremy Wariner, who was half a second ahead. Nevertheless, the silver medal was Merritt's first at a global championships over the 400 m. He again formed part of the United States' 4 × 400 meter relay team and, with fellow individual medallists Wariner and Taylor among the team, the American's eased to victory some three and a half seconds ahead of the Bahamians. With Wariner absent from the field, Merritt won the gold medal at the 2007 IAAF World Athletics Final.

=== Olympic champion and Wariner duels ===
Merritt's 2008 season was marked by an intense rivalry with Wariner, who had won the 400 m at every major global championship since 2004. The 2008 IAAF Golden League provided the venue for many of their duels. He scored his first major win over Wariner in a close affair at the Internationales Stadionfest in Berlin. He confirmed his Olympic place a month later by winning at the 2008 United States Olympic Trials, again defeating the reigning Olympic champion Wariner. Later in July at the Golden Gala meeting, Wariner responded by edging a win in the 400 m by just 0.01 seconds. At the Meeting Gaz de France in Paris, the last Golden League competition before the Olympics, Wariner seemed to have the momentum behind him after a win in 43.86 seconds.

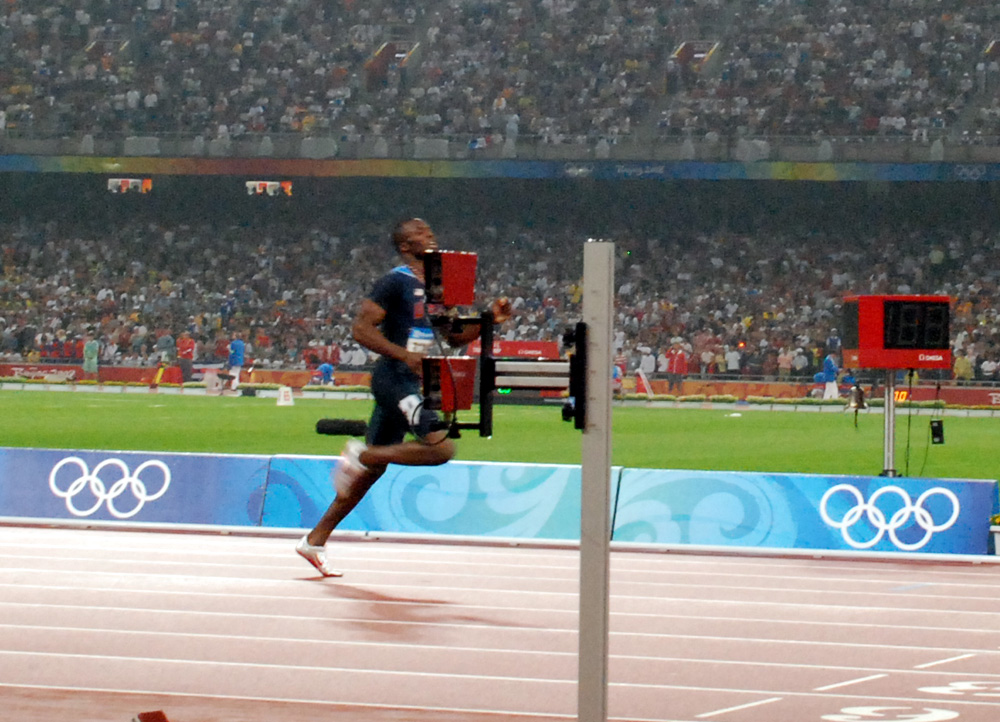
Merritt winning 2008 Olympic gold, a second ahead of Jeremy Wariner

Merritt won the 400 m at the 2008 Summer Olympics in Beijing. A close race between Merritt and Wariner was expected, though it ultimately ended in a rout. The 0.99-second margin between Merritt's first-place finish and Wariner's second-place finish was the largest in an Olympic 400 m final. His time of 43.75, a new personal best, made him the fifth fastest 400 m runner on the all-time lists, still two places behind Wariner, who is third on the all-time list of fastest runners. He teamed up with Wariner, Angelo Taylor and 400 m bronze medallist David Neville for the men's 4 × 400 m relay. The team defeated the Olympic record mark which had stood since the 1992 Barcelona Olympics by running a time of 2:55.39, the second fastest in the history of the event.

Weeks after the Olympics, he lost to Wariner by a large margin at the Weltklasse Zürich, although Wariner's winning time of 43.82 seconds was still slower than Merritt's Olympic winning run. Merritt secured his fourth win over Wariner that season at the 2008 IAAF World Athletics Final. Although the two had both beaten each other that season, Merritt had won all the most important races, ending the season as the Olympic and American champion over 400 m as well as taking home the World Athletics Final payday. He opted to miss out on the 2009 indoor season to focus on improving his running and technique.

=== 2009 World Champion and doping ban ===
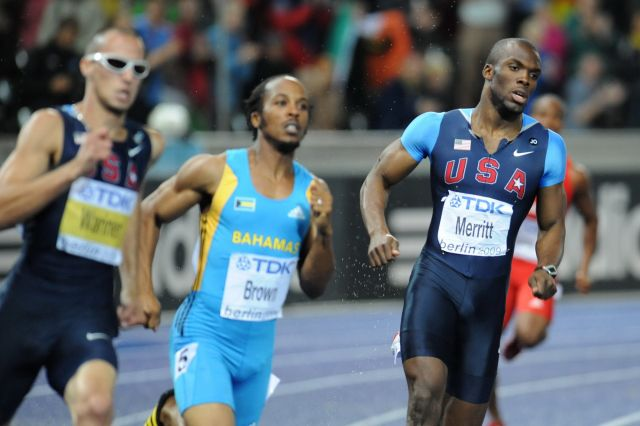
Merritt en route to becoming 400 m world champion in 2009

With Wariner already qualified for the World Championships as the defending champion, Merritt won the 400 m at the 2009 US Championships somewhat uncontested, equalling his own world leading time of 44.50 seconds. At the 2009 World Championships in Athletics, in Berlin, he went on to win the 400 m in a world-leading time of 44.06 seconds, once again beating Wariner.

In October 2010, Merritt was issued with 21-month competition ban backdated to October 2009 after testing positive three times for DHEA and pregnenolone. The American Arbitration Association's ruling accepted Merritt had unintentionally consumed the banned substances contained within a male enhancement product called ExtenZe.

=== 2011: Return to the track ===
After serving his competition ban, Merritt finished second at the Stockholm meeting of the Diamond League series with a time of 44.74. He received a berth to the 2011 World Championships in Daegu, South Korea due to him being the 2009 World Champion for the 400 meters. At the 2011 World Championships, he set a world leading time of 44.35. He eventually won the silver medal behind teenager Kirani James of Grenada, having led most of the race, but went on to run the final leg of the United States' gold medal-winning 4 × 400 m relay team having been in third place coming out of the final bend.

=== 2012 ===
Merritt was the number one qualifier at the 2012 Olympic Trials. Two weeks before the track and field events at the 2012 Summer Olympics, Merritt tweaked his hamstring in the Herculis meet in Monaco. As a result of this injury he pulled up in a qualifying heat of the 400 m at the London Olympics and did not finish.

=== 2016 ===
Merritt qualified once again onto the US team for the 400 meters at the 2016 Summer Olympics in Rio de Janeiro. He ran a very quick time of 43.85 but only managed to win the bronze medal behind defending Olympic champion, Kirani James of Grenada, who won the silver medal with a time of 43.76, and Wayde van Niekerk of South Africa, who won the gold medal with a new world record time of 43.03.

=== 2017 ===
Merritt announced his retirement following the 2017 World Championships in Athletics.

== Personal bests ==
Event	Time (sec)	Venue	Date
100 metres	10.56	Lynchburg, Virginia, United States	March 31, 2007
200 metres	19.74	Eugene, Oregon, United States	July 8, 2016
300 metres	31.23	Kingston, Jamaica, Jamaica	June 11, 2016
400 metres	43.65	Beijing, China	August 26, 2015
Indoor events
60 metres	6.68	Lynchburg, Virginia, United States	February 18, 2006
200 metres	20.40	Fayetteville, Arkansas, United States	February 12, 2005
300 metres	31.94	Fayetteville, Arkansas, United States	February 10, 2006
400 metres	44.93	Fayetteville, Arkansas, United States	February 11, 2005
500 metres	1:01.39	New York City, New York, United States	February 10, 2012

- All information taken from IAAF profile.

Merritt is one of only six men in history to have broken 20 seconds for the 200 metres and 44 seconds for the 400 metres, the other men being Michael Johnson, Isaac Makwala, Wayde Van Niekerk, Michael Norman, and Fred Kerley.

His personal best of 43.65 seconds for the 400 metres, set in Beijing on 26 August 2015, was the fastest non-winning time in history until the 2024 Olympic final where Matthew Hudson-Smith lowered this record to 43.44 seconds.

== Achievements ==
Year	Competition	Venue	Position	Event	Result
2004	World Junior Championships	Grosseto, Italy	1st	400 m	45.25
2004	World Junior Championships	Grosseto, Italy	1st	4 × 100 m relay	38.66 WJR
2004	World Junior Championships	Grosseto, Italy	1st	4 × 400 m relay	3:01.09 WJR
2005	World Championships	Helsinki, Finland	1st	4 × 400 m relay	3:00.48 (heats)
2006	World Indoor Championships	Moscow, Russia	1st	4 × 400 m relay	3:03.24
2006	World Athletics Final	Stuttgart, Germany	3rd	400 m	44.14
2006	World Cup	Athens, Greece	1st	400 m	44.54
2006	World Cup	Athens, Greece	1st	4 × 400 m relay	3:00.11
2007	World Championships	Osaka, Japan	2nd	400 m	43.96 PB
2007	World Championships	Osaka, Japan	1st	4 × 400 m relay	2:55.56
2007	World Athletics Final	Stuttgart, Germany	1st	400 m	44.58
2008	Olympic Games	Beijing, China	1st	400 m	43.75 PB
2008	Olympic Games	Beijing, China	1st	4 × 400 m relay	2:55.39
2009	World Championships	Berlin, Germany	1st	400 m	44.06
2009	World Championships	Berlin, Germany	1st	4 × 400 m relay	2:57.86
2009	World Athletics Final	Thessaloniki, Greece	1st	400 m	44.93
2011	World Championships	Daegu, South Korea	2nd	400 m	44.63
2011	World Championships	Daegu, South Korea	1st	4 × 400 m relay	2:59.31
2012	Olympic Games	London, United Kingdom	—	400 m	DNF
2013	World Championships	Moscow, Russia	1st	400 m	43.74 PB; TRACK RECORD
2013	World Championships	Moscow, Russia	1st	4 × 400 m relay	2:58.71
2014	IAAF World Relays	Nassau, Bahamas	1st	4 × 400 m relay	2:57.25
2015	IAAF World Relays	Nassau, Bahamas	1st	4 × 400 m relay	2:58.43
2015	World Championships	Beijing, China	2nd	400 m	43.65 PB
2015	World Championships	Beijing, China	1st	4 × 400 m relay	2:57.82
2016	Olympic Games	Rio de Janeiro, Brazil	3rd	400 m	43.85
2016	Olympic Games	Rio de Janeiro, Brazil	1st	4 × 400 m relay	2:57.30
2017	IAAF World Relays	Nassau, Bahamas	1st	4 × 400 m relay	3:02.13
2017	World Championships	London, United Kingdom	20th (sf)	400 m	45.52

=== Track records ===
As of September 2024, Merritt holds the following track records for 200 metres and 400 metres.

==== 200 metres ====
Location	Time	Windspeed m/s	Date
Greensboro	19.80	+3.2	19/04/2008
Nassau	19.78	+0.9	16/04/2016

==== 400 metres ====
Location	Time	Date
Daegu	44.35	28/08/2011
Edmonton	44.30	06/07/2014
Moscow	43.74	13/08/2013
New York City	44.19	14/06/2014
Ostrava	44.16	17/06/2014
Ponce	44.14	17/05/2014
Raleigh	44.72	28/03/2008

Awards
Preceded by Jason Richardson	USA Track & Field Youth Athlete of the Year; 2004	Succeeded by Ebony Collins
