= Julius Kirwa =

Kenyan sprinter

Medal record

Men's athletics

Representing Kenya

African Championships
Gold medal – first place	2010 Nairobi	4×400 m

Julius Kirwa (born May 3, 1989, in Nandi Hills) is a Kenyan runner who mainly runs 400 metres races.

He represented Kenya at the 2006 Commonwealth Games at the age of 16. At the 2005 IAAF World Youth Championships he won silver medal while at 2006 IAAF World Junior Championships he was fourth in his semi final heat, failing to advance to the final.

He is not to be confused with Julius Kirwa, Kenyan national athletics team coach and former steeplechase runner.
