= 2005 World Championships in Athletics – Men's 400 metres =

The men's 400 metres at the 2005 World Championships in Athletics was held on August 9, 10 and 12 at the Helsinki Olympic Stadium. The winning margin was 0.42 seconds.

== Medalists ==
Gold	Jeremy Wariner; United States (USA)
Silver	Andrew Rock; United States (USA)
Bronze	Tyler Christopher; Canada (CAN)

== Results ==
All times shown are in seconds.

AR area record | CR championship record | GR games record | NR national record | OR Olympic record | PB personal best | SB season best | WL world leading (in a given season)
DNS = did not start | DQ = disqualification | NM = no mark (i.e. no valid result) | Q = qualification by place in heat | q = qualification by overall place

=== Heats ===
August 9, 2005

==== Heat 1 ====
1. (United Kingdom) Timothy Benjamin 44.85 Q
2. (Jamaica) Brandon Simpson 44.98 Q
3. (Nigeria) James Godday 45.30 q (PB)
4. (Botswana) California Molefe 45.34 q (NR)
5. (Switzerland) Pierre Lavanchy 45.79 q
6. (Croatia) Željko Vincek 46.03
7. (Jordan) Abdesalem Khalifeh Bajes Al-Hajjaj 48.89
8. (Monaco) Florent Battistel 50.54

==== Heat 2 ====
1. (United States) Jeremy Wariner 45.24 Q
2. (United Kingdom) Robert Tobin 45.41 Q
3. (Zimbabwe) Young Talkmore Nyongani 45.55 q
4. (Saudi Arabia) Hamdan Odha Al-Bishi 45.88 q
5. (Belgium) Cedric van Branteghem 46.42
6. (Mexico) Alejandro Cárdenas 46.73 (SB)
7. (French Polynesia) Isaac Yaya 47.75

==== Heat 3 ====
1. (Australia) John Steffensen 45.62 Q
2. (Canada) Tyler Christopher 45.66 Q
3. (Dominican Republic) Arismendy Peguero 45.80 q (SB)
4. (Mauritius) Eric Milazar 45.91
5. (The Bahamas) Andrae Williams 46.49
6. (Germany) Simon Kirch 47.45
7. (Yemen) Saeed Al-Adhreai 49.74
  - (Bangladesh) Tawhid Tawhidul Islam DQ

==== Heat 4 ====
1. (United States) Andrew Rock 44.98 Q
2. (The Bahamas) Chris Brown 45.20 Q
3. (Italy) Andrea Barberi 45.70 q (PB)
4. (Tunisia) Sofiane Labidi 45.71 q
5. (Japan) Mitsuhiro Sato 45.78 q (SB)
6. (Brazil) Anderson Jorge dos Santos 46.32
7. (Chinese Taipei) Chung Cheng-Kang 47.85 (PB)
8. (San Marino) Glauco Martini 51.48

==== Heat 5 ====
1. (Jamaica) Michael Blackwood 45.58 Q
2. (Dominican Republic) Carlos Santa 45.63 Q
3. (Grenada) Alleyne Francique 45.77 q
4. (Poland) Marcin Marciniszyn 45.97
5. (Trinidad and Tobago) Damion Barry 46.20
6. (Costa Rica) Nery Brenes 47.11
7. (Azerbaijan) Ibrahim Ahmadov 48.51

==== Heat 6 ====
1. (Democratic Republic of the Congo) Gary Kikaya 45.88 Q
2. (Jamaica) Lanceford Spence 46.21 Q
3. (South Africa) Ofentse Mogawane 46.80
4. (Barbados) Wilan Louis 46.93
5. (Sri Lanka) Prasanna Sampath Amarasekara 47.11
6. (Solomon Islands) Chris Meke Walasi 49.47
  - (Mauritania) Boubou Gandéga DQ
  - (Nigeria) Saul Weigopwa DQ

==== Heat 7 ====
1. (United States) Darold Williamson 45.97 Q
2. (Sudan) Nagmeldin Ali Abubakr 46.02 Q
3. (United Kingdom) Malachi Davis 46.14
4. (Trinidad and Tobago) Ato Modibo 46.28
5. (France) Leslie Djhone 46.57
6. (Dominica) Chris Lloyd 47.13
7. (Vanuatu) Moses Kamut 48.63

=== Semi-finals ===
August 10, 2005

==== Heat 1 ====
1. (Jamaica) Brandon Simpson 45.53 Q
2. (United States) Andrew Rock 45.78 Q
3. (Australia) John Steffensen 46.06 q
4. (Dominican Republic) Carlos Santa 46.07
5. (Grenada) Alleyne Francique 46.59
6. (Nigeria) James Godday 46.62
7. (Saudi Arabia) Hamdan Odha Al-Bishi 46.80
8. (Italy) Andrea Barberi 47.10

==== Heat 2 ====
1. (Canada) Tyler Christopher 45.47 Q
2. (United States) Darold Williamson 45.65 Q
3. (United Kingdom) Timothy Benjamin 45.66 q
4. (Dominican Republic) Arismendy Peguero 46.08
5. (Democratic Republic of the Congo) Gary Kikaya 46.15
6. (Sudan) Nagmeldin Ali Abubakr 46.67
7. (Jamaica) Lanceford Spence 47.20
  - (Tunisia) Sofiane Labidi DNF

==== Heat 3 ====
1. (United States) Jeremy Wariner 45.65 Q
2. (The Bahamas) Chris Brown 45.67 Q
3. (Jamaica) Michael Blackwood 46.25
4. (United Kingdom) Robert Tobin 46.69
5. (Switzerland) Pierre Lavanchy 47.19
6. (Zimbabwe) Young Talkmore Nyongani 47.20
7. (Botswana) California Molefe 47.26
8. (Japan) Mitsuhiro Sato 48.55

=== Final ===
August 12, 2005

1. (United States) Jeremy Wariner 43.93 (WL)
2. (United States) Andrew Rock 44.35 (PB)
3. (Canada) Tyler Christopher 44.44 (NR)
4. (The Bahamas) Chris Brown 44.48 (PB)
5. (United Kingdom) Timothy Benjamin 44.93
6. (Jamaica) Brandon Simpson 45.01
7. (United States) Darold Williamson 45.12
8. (Australia) John Steffensen 45.46
