= David Neville (sprinter) =

American sprinter

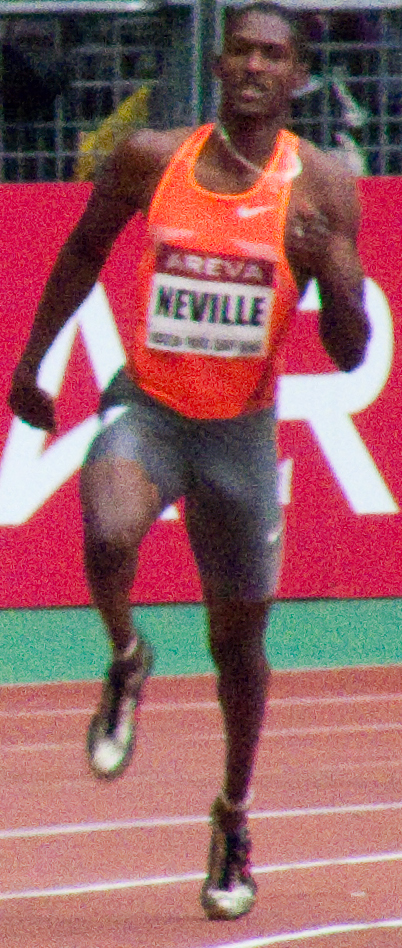
- Neville in 2009

Personal information
- Nationality: American
- Born: June 1, 1984 (age 42) Merrillville, Indiana
- Height: 6 ft 3 in (1.91 m)
- Weight: 160 lb (73 kg)
- Website: DavidNeville3.com

Sport
- Sport: Running
- Event: 400 metres

Achievements and titles
- Personal bests: 100 m: 10.86 (Indianapolis, 2003) 200 m: 20.39 (West Lafayette, 2004) 400 m: 44.61 (Eugene, 2008)
Medal record
Men's athletics
Representing the United States
Olympic Games
Gold medal – first place	2008 Beijing	4 × 400 m relay
Bronze medal – third place	2008 Beijing	400 m
NACAC Championships
Gold medal – first place	2007 San Salvador	4 × 400 m relay
Pan American Junior Championships
Silver medal – second place	2003 Bridgetown	200 m

David Neville (born June 1, 1984) is an American sprinter who specializes in the 400 meters and two-time medalist (one gold, one bronze) in the Summer Olympics. A native of Merrillville, Indiana, Neville became the first individual track and field medalist out of Indiana University since Willie May won silver in the 110-meter hurdles in 1960.

== Career ==
Neville attended Merrillville High School from 1998 to 2002 where he ran track and field. He then moved to Indiana University where he competed from 2003 until 2006 winning several individual Big Ten conference titles and being named an All-American.

At the 2008 Summer Olympic, Neville won a bronze medal in the men's 400 m with a time of 44.80 seconds. Neville then teamed with LaShawn Merritt, Angelo Taylor, and Jeremy Wariner in the 4 × 400 m relay to finish first with an Olympic record time of 2:55.39. Neville clocked a split of 44.16 seconds. David is now the head coach of Georgia Southern's track and field and cross country.

== Personal bests ==
Event	Time	Venue	Date
200 m	20.39 (9.8 m/s)	West Lafayette	May 16, 2004
400 m	44.61	Eugene	July 3, 2008

== Personal life ==
Neville is a Christian. After retiring from running, Neville took the Head Coaching position at Taylor University Men's and Women's Track and Field. There he recruited several Division 1 caliber athletes such as NAIA Champion Caleb Anthony (400 m Hurdles), Crossroads League Champion Sam Lacher (400 m), and Luke Wilson (High Jump) before moving on the University of Tennessee - Knoxville to lead the Olympian filled sprint squad in 2017.

In 2016 Neville competed in American Grit, finishing in sixth place.
