= Noah Akwu =

Nigerian sprinter

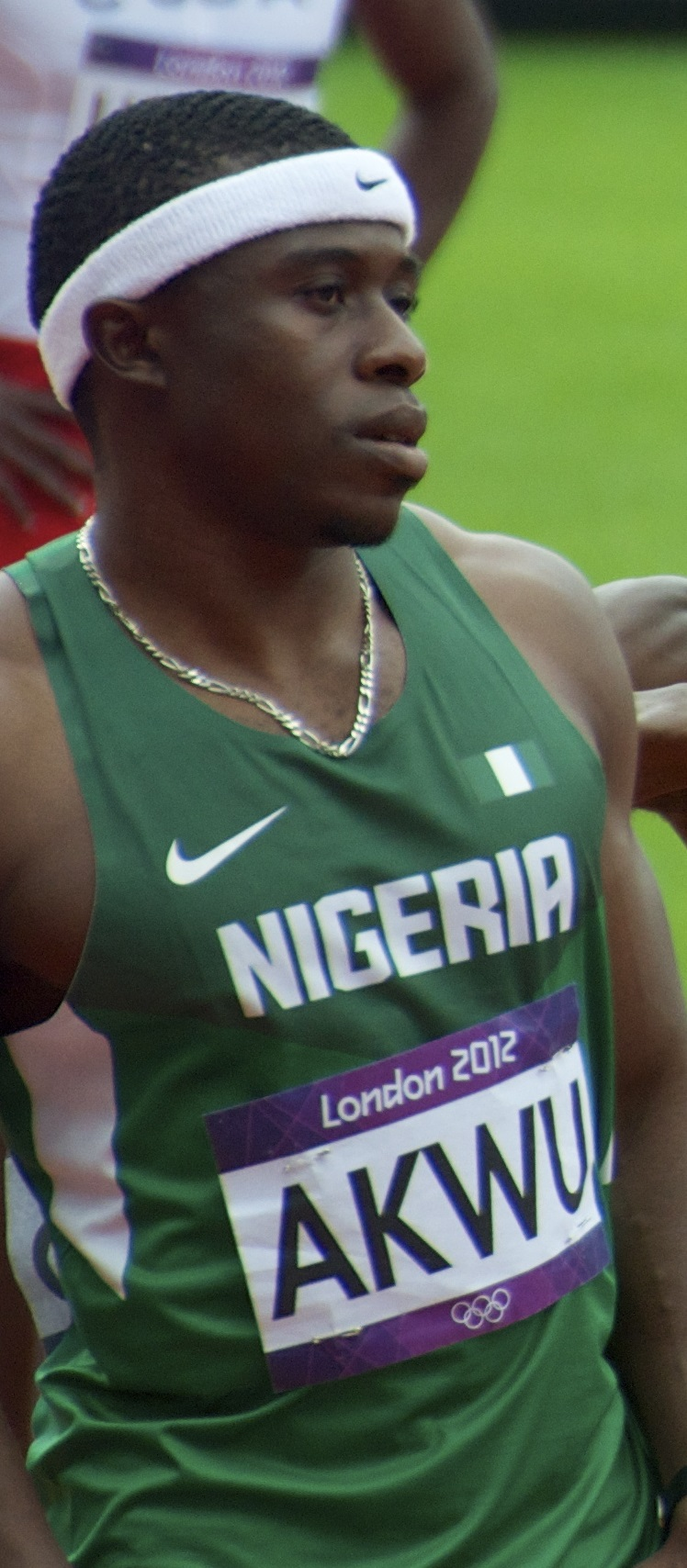

Medal record

Men's athletics

Representing Nigeria

African Championships
Silver medal – second place	2014 Marrakesh	4×400 m
Bronze medal – third place	2012 Porto-Novo	200 m

Noah Akogwu Akwu (born 23 September 1990 in Enugu) is a Nigerian sprinter who specialized in the 200 and 400 metres. He competed at one Olympic Games, two World Championships, two World Indoor Championships, one Commonwealth Games and four African Championships. He won a silver and a bronze medal on the continental level.

== Career ==
He was born in Enugu and did several sports in school. In his early career, he competed at the 2008 African Championships, the 2008 World Junior Championships and the 2010 African Championships without reaching the final. He took the bronze medal at the 2009 Nigerian Championships before winning the 2010 edition. When he also won the 2010 ECOWAS U23 Games in Abuja, he set a personal best of 46.02 seconds.

In the 4 × 400 metres relay, he finished sixth at the 2008 World Junior Championships, fifth at the 2008 African Championships and eighth at the 2009 World Championships.

Akwu did his first tour of European meets in the summer of 2010. From the same year he competed collegiately in the US for the Middle Tennessee Blue Raiders track and field. He competed at his first NCAA Division I Indoor Championships in 2011, in the 200 metres, lowering his personal best time to 20.86 seconds (from 20.94 in 2009 and 20.91 in 2010). He changed his specialty from 400 to 200 metres for the time being.

In 2012 he finished second at the Nigerian Championships, then won the bronze mdal individually at the 2012 African Championships. He also competed at the 2012 Summer Olympics without reaching the final.

In 2013 he competed at his first NCAA Division I Outdoor Championships, but only in the relay. After a long season in the US, he went to Nigeria and ran sub-46 in the 400 metres; first 45.91 at the Warri CAA Super Grand Prix and then 45.61 as hee won the Nigerian Championships. Here he also took the 200 metres silver. He competed in the relay at the 2013 World Championships as well as the 2014 World Indoor Championships without reaching the final. However, at the 2014 World Indoor Championships he set a Nigerian indoor record of 3:07.95 minutes.

Following a shorter US season and the 2014 World Relays, Akwu took the 2014 Nigerian Championships silver, was disqualified at the 2014 Commonwealth Games, and finished seventh at the 2014 African Championships. In the relay he finished seventh at the 2014 Commonwealth Games and won a silver medal at the 2014 African Championships.

In 2015 he only competed in Nigeria, finishing third at the national championships. After a fifth place in relay at the 2016 World Indoor Championships and a fifth place individually at the 2017 Nigerian Championships, Akwu stopped competing.

His personal best times were 10.46 seconds in the 100 metres, achieved in March 2010 in Kaduna; 20.54 seconds in the 200 metres, achieved in July 2012 in Kumasi; and 45.61 seconds in the 400 metres, achieved in June 2013 in Calabar.

== Personal life ==
Settling in the United States, Akwu enlisted as a combat medic in the US Army in 2022, wanting to become a flight paramedic as well as become a US citizen.
