= Željko Vincek =

Croatian sprinter (born 1986)

Željko Vincek (born 16 June 1986) is a Croatian sprinter who specializes in the 400 metres.

He won the bronze medal at the 2003 World Youth Championships, the gold medal at the 2005 European Junior Championships and the silver medal at the 2005 Mediterranean Games He also competed in the 2005 World Championships, the 2006 European Championships and the 2007 European Indoor Championships without reaching the final.

His personal best time is 45.69 seconds, achieved in July 2007 in Debrecen.
