= Clyde Hart =

American track and field coach (1934–2025)

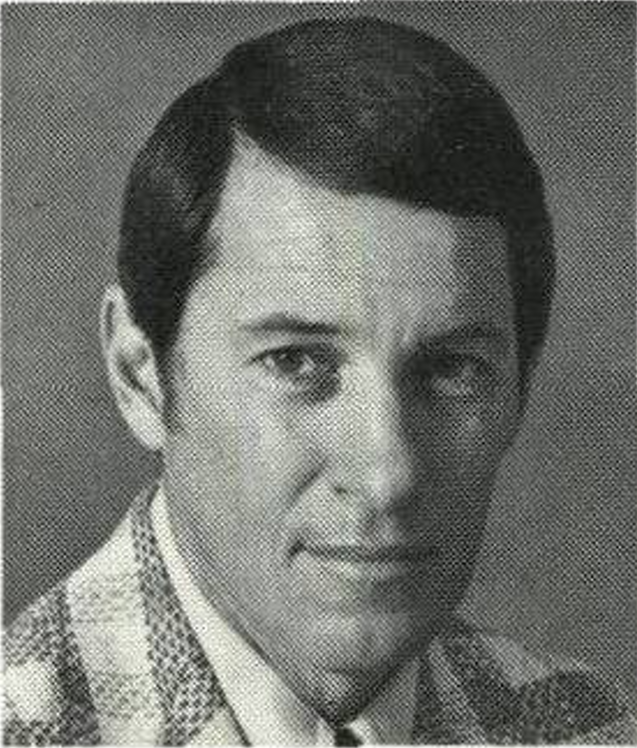
Hart, c. 1976

Clyde Hart (February 3, 1934 – November 1, 2025) was an American coach of track and field at Baylor University. Hart retired as head coach for the Baylor track program on June 14, 2005, after 42 years with the program.

Hart was primarily known as the only coach to have instructed Michael Johnson, the gold medal winner in the individual 400 meters at the 1996 and 2000 Summer Olympics.

He also recruited and coached Jeremy Wariner and Darold Williamson to gold medals in the 2004 Summer Olympics in Athens, Greece — Wariner in the individual 400 meters, and both in the 4x400 meter relay. Wariner and Hart briefly parted ways in 2008, reuniting a year later.

Another one of his pupils, Greg Haughton, won bronze at the 2000 Summer Olympics in Sydney, and he also coached Sanya Richards, who was the top-ranked female 400 runner in the world in 2007 and won gold at the 2012 Summer Olympics.

Hart was a state champion sprinter at Hot Springs, Arkansas and graduated from Baylor University in 1956 with a Bachelor's degree, and later from the University of Arkansas with a Master's degree.

Hart was married to Maxine Hart. He died in Waco on November 1, 2025, at the age of 91, after a year long battle with cancer.

== Awards and accolades ==
- World Athletics Awards - Coach of the Year：2009

In 2017, Hart was awarded the Legend Coach Award by USA Track & Field.
