= Nagmeldin Ali Abubakr =

Sudanese sprinter (born 1986)

Medal record

Men's athletics

Representing Sudan

African Championships
Gold medal – first place	2008 Addis Ababa	400 m
Silver medal – second place	2008 Addis Ababa	4×400 m

Nagmeldin Ali Abubakr (born February 22, 1986) is a Sudanese athlete who mainly competes in the 400 metres. He was born in Khartoum.

His current personal best time is 44.93 seconds, achieved in April 2005 in Mecca.

Ali competed in the 400 metres event at the 2008 Summer Olympics in Beijing failing to advance to the semifinals.

He lives in Nyala, southern Darfur, and is a sergeant in the Sudanese army. His family is of the Zaghawa (Beri) ethnic group.

== Achievements ==
Year	Competition	Venue	Position	Event	Notes
Representing Sudan
2003	World Youth Championships	Sherbrooke, Canada	1st	400 m	46.10
2003	World Championships	Paris, France	43rd (h)	400 m	46.78
2003	All-Africa Games	Abuja, Nigeria	2nd	400 m	45.22
2003	Afro-Asian Games	Hyderabad, India	2nd	400 m	45.44
2004	World Indoor Championships	Budapest, Hungary	20th (h)	400 m	47.85
2004	World Junior Championships	Grosseto, Italy	2nd	400 m	45.97
2004	Olympic Games	Athens, Greece	39th (h)	400 m	46.32
2004	Pan Arab Games	Algiers, Algeria	2nd	400 m	45.84
2005	Islamic Solidarity Games	Mecca, Saudi Arabia	1st	400 m	44.93
2005	Islamic Solidarity Games	Mecca, Saudi Arabia	2nd	4 × 400 m relay	3:08.81
2005	World Championships	Helsinki, Finland	15th (sf)	400 m	46.67
2007	All-Africa Games	Algiers, Algeria	6th	400 m	46.29
2007	All-Africa Games	Algiers, Algeria	7th	4 × 400 m relay	3:09.37
2007	Pan Arab Games	Cairo, Egypt	5th	200 m	21.27
2007	Pan Arab Games	Cairo, Egypt	1st	400 m	46.16
2007	Pan Arab Games	Cairo, Egypt	2nd	4 × 400 m relay	3:06.52 (NR)
2008	African Championships	Addis Ababa, Ethiopia	1st	400 m	45.64
2008	Olympic Games	Beijing, China	50th (h)	400 m	47.12
2009	World Championships	Berlin, Germany	36th (h)	400 m	46.48
