= Pieter Smith =

South African sprinter

Personal information
- Nationality: South Africa
- Born: 3 April 1987 (age 39) Upington, South Africa
- Height: 1.92 m (6 ft 3 1/2 in)
- Weight: 75 kg (165 lb)

Sport
- Sport: Athletics
- Event: 4 × 400 metres relay
- Team: Nebraska Cornhuskers (USA)

Achievements and titles
- Personal best: 400 m: 45.63 s (2009)
Medal record
Men's athletics
Representing South Africa
African Championships
Gold medal – first place	2008 Addis Ababa	4×400 m

Pieter Smith (born April 3, 1987) is a South African sprinter, who specialized in the 400 metres. He set his personal best time of 45.63 seconds by winning the 400 metres event at the 2009 South African Championships in Stellenbosch.

Smith competed for the men's 4 × 400 m relay at the 2008 Summer Olympics in Beijing, along with his teammates L. J. van Zyl, Ofentse Mogawane, and Alwyn Myburgh. He ran on the starting leg of the first heat, with an individual-split time of 45.74 seconds. Smith and his team finished the relay in sixth place for a seasonal best time of 3:01.26, failing to advance into the final.

Smith was a member of the Nebraska Cornhuskers track and field team, and an economics graduate of the University of Nebraska–Lincoln.
