= Nouha Badji =

Senegalese sprinter

Medal record

Men's athletics

Representing Senegal

African Championships
Bronze medal – third place	2008 Addis Ababa	4×400 m

Nouha Badji (born 13 March 1986) is a retired Senegalese sprinter who specialized in the 400 metres.

In the 400 metres he finished eighth at the 2008 African Championships. He also competed at the 2005 African Junior Championships and the 2009 Jeux de la Francophonie without reaching the final.

In the 4 × 400 metres relay he won a bronze medal at the 2005 African Junior Championships and at the 2008 African Championships.

His personal best time was 46.58 seconds, achieved in the semi-final of the 2008 African Championships in Athletics in Addis Abeba.
