= Benin at the 2019 World Athletics Championships =

Benin at the 2019 World Championships in Athletics
- WA code: BEN

in Doha, Qatar
- Competitors: 2
- Medals: Gold 0 Silver 0 Bronze 0 Total 0

World Championships in Athletics appearances
- 1983; 1987; 1991; 1993; 1995; 1997; 1999; 2001; 2003; 2005; 2007; 2009; 2011; 2013; 2015; 2017; 2019; 2022; 2023

Benin competed at the 2019 World Championships in Athletics in Doha, Qatar, from 27 September–6 October 2019.

== Results ==
(q – qualified, NM – no mark, SB – season best)

=== Women ===
Track and road events

Athlete	Event	Heat		Semi-final		Final	
Athlete	Event	Result	Rank	Result	Rank	Result	Rank
Noélie Yarigo	800 metres	2:01.19	4 Q	2:00.75	11	Did not advance	

Combined events – Heptathlon

Athlete	Event	100H	HJ	SP	200 m	LJ	JT	800 m	Final	Rank
Odile Ahouanwanou	Result	13.45 (+0.4)	1.77 SB	14.13	24.05 (+1.0)	6.00 PB (-0.2)	46.74 PB	2:22.89 SB	6210 NR	8
Odile Ahouanwanou	Points	1058	941	803	976	850	797	785	6210 NR	8
