= Benin at the 2013 World Championships in Athletics =

- WA code: BEN
- National federation: Fédération Béninoise d'Athlétisme

in Moscow
- Competitors: 1
- Medals: Gold 0 Silver 0 Bronze 0 Total 0

World Championships in Athletics appearances
- 1983; 1987; 1991; 1993; 1995; 1997; 1999; 2001; 2003; 2005; 2007; 2009; 2011; 2013; 2015; 2017; 2019; 2022; 2023

Benin competed at the 2013 World Championships in Athletics in Moscow, Russia, from 10 to 18 August 2013. A team of 1 athlete was announced to represent the country in the event.

== Results ==
(q – qualified, NM – no mark, SB – season best)

=== Men ===
| Athlete | Event | Preliminaries | | Heats | | Semifinals | | Final | |
| Athlete | Event | Time | Rank | Time | Rank | Time | Rank | Time | Rank |
|---|---|---|---|---|---|---|---|---|---|
| Didier Kiki | 200 metres | | | 22.01 PB | 52 | did not advance | | | |
