= Benin at the 2022 World Athletics Championships =

- Flag of Benin
- WA code: BEN
- National federation: Fédération Béninoise d'Athlétisme Amateur

in Eugene, United States 15–24 July 2022
- Competitors: 2 (2 women)

World Athletics Championships appearances
- 1983; 1987; 1991; 1993; 1995; 1997; 1999; 2001; 2003; 2005; 2007; 2009; 2011; 2013; 2015; 2017; 2019; 2022; 2023

Benin competed at the 2022 World Athletics Championships in Eugene, United States, from 15 to 24 July 2022. Benin entered 2 athletes.

== Results ==
Key

- Q = Qualified for the next round
- q = Qualified for the next round as a fastest loser or, in field events, by position without achieving the qualifying target
- NR = National record
- PB = Personal best
- SB = Season best
- N/A = Round not applicable for the event
- including alternates

=== Women ===
Track and road events

Athlete	Event	Heat		Semi-final		Final	
Athlete	Event	Result	Rank	Result	Rank	Result	Rank
Noélie Yarigo	800 m	2:01.58	19 Q	2:01.52	22	did not advance	

Combined events – Heptathlon

Athlete	Event	100H	HJ	SP	200 m	LJ	JT	800 m	Final	Rank
Odile Ahouanwanou	Result	DNS								
Odile Ahouanwanou	Points	DNS								
