= Mathieu Gnanligo =

Beninese sprinter

Personal information
- Nationality: Beninese
- Born: 13 December 1986 (age 39) Porto-Novo, Benin
- Height: 1.80 m (5 ft 11 in)
- Weight: 76 kg (168 lb)

Sport
- Country: Benin
- Sport: Athletics
- Event: 400 metres
- Updated on 21 July 2012

Mathieu Gnanligo (born 13 December 1986) is a Beninese sprinter who specializes in the 400 metres. His personal best time is 45.88 seconds, achieved in the heats of the 2008 African Championships in Addis Ababa.

He won a bronze medal at the 2007 All-African Games and finished seventh at the 2008 African Championships. He also competed at the 2007 World Championships and the 2008 and 2012 Olympic Games without reaching the final round.

== Major competitions record ==
Year	Competition	Venue	Position	Event	Notes
Representing Benin
2004	African Championships	Brazzaville, Republic of the Congo	19th (h)	400 m	48.72
2005	Jeux de la Francophonie	Niamey, Niger	1st	400 m	46.43
2006	African Championships	Bambous, Mauritius	21st (h)	400 m	47.76
2007	All-Africa Games	Algiers, Algeria	3rd	400 m	45.89
2007	All-Africa Games	Algiers, Algeria	10th (h)	4 × 400 m relay	3:12.03
2007	World Championships	Osaka, Japan	47th (h)	400 m	47.51
2008	African Championships	Addis Ababa, Ethiopia	7th	400 m	46.19
2008	Olympic Games	Beijing, China	49th (h)	400 m	47.10
2009	Jeux de la Francophonie	Beirut, Lebanon	2nd	400 m	46.03
2009	World Championships	Berlin, Germany	41st (h)	400 m	47.00
2011	World Championships	Daegu, South Korea	28th (h)	400 m	47.01
2011	All-Africa Games	Maputo, Mozambique	16th (sf)	400 m	DNF
2012	African Championships	Porto-Novo, Benin	4th	400 m	45.82 (NR)
2012	Olympic Games	London, United Kingdom	–	400 m	DNF
