= Rabah Yousif =

British Sudanese athlete

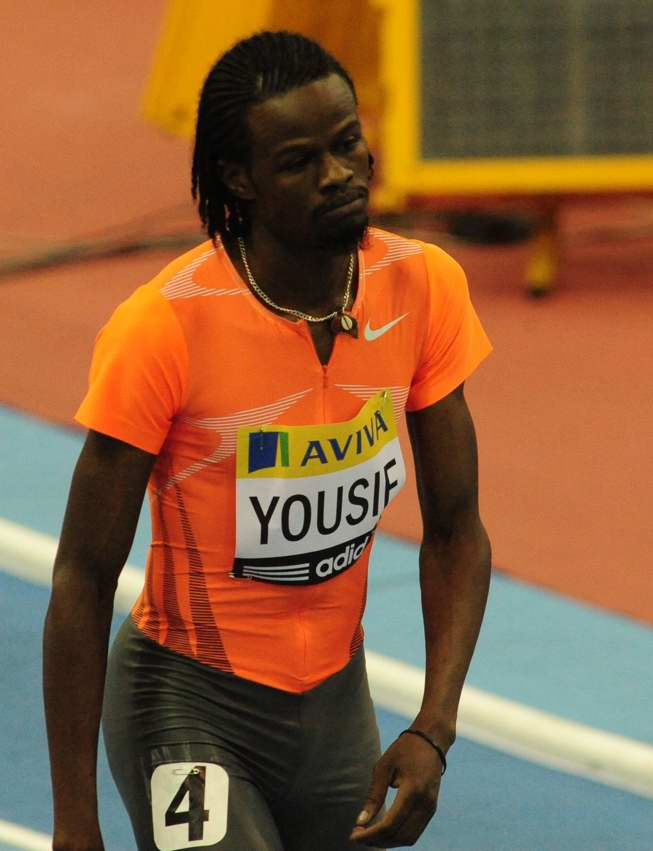
- Rabah Yousif at the 2010 Aviva Grand Prix.

Personal information
- Nationality: British/Sudanese
- Born: 11 December 1986 (age 39) Omdurman, Sudan
- Height: 1.84 m (6 ft 0 in)
- Weight: 71 kg (157 lb)

Sport
- Sport: Men's athletics
- Event: 400 metres
- Coached by: Carol Williams

Achievements and titles
- Personal best: 400 metres: 44.54s (Beijing 2015)
Medal record
Men's athletics
Representing Great Britain
World Championships
Bronze medal – third place	2015 Beijing	4×400 m
Bronze medal – third place	2017 London	4×400 m
European Championships
Gold medal – first place	2014 Zürich	4 x 400 m
Silver medal – second place	2018 Berlin	4 x 400 m
Bronze medal – third place	2016 Amsterdam	4 x 400 m
Representing Sudan
All-Africa Games
Gold medal – first place	2011 Maputo	400 m
African Championships in Athletics
Silver medal – second place	2008 Addis Ababa	4×400 m
Silver medal – second place	2010 Nairobi	400 m
Pan Arab Games
Bronze medal – third place	2011 Doha	400 m

Rabah Mahhamed Yousif Bkheit (Arabic: رباح يوسف; born 11 December 1986) is a Sudanese-born British track and field athlete, who initially competed for Sudan before obtaining British citizenship.

== Early life and British asylum ==
Yousif is the son of Mohamed Yousif Bakhit, who was Sudanese National Champion in the 100 and 200 metres in the late 1960s and early 1970s. There were also three other athletes within his close family, and he took to sports at a young age. At the age of 14, while training for the Championships with other Sudanese athletes in Sheffield, in the United Kingdom, he applied for asylum, and was granted temporary leave to stay. However his asylum application was declined.

In 2005, it was reported that Yusif was seeking British citizenship. In 2007, he was described as "one of Britain's brightest hopes for an Olympic medal", but a judge turned down his asylum plea, and he faced deportation. By that point, he had married a British woman in 2008 – and has two children, thus, granting him a spouse's visa to remain. In 2008, he was still living in the United Kingdom, with his wife in the English town of Middlesbrough while competing internationally in the colours of Sudan having "got back in touch with the Sudanese authorities who guaranteed his safety through his solicitors" and working part-time in factories and restaurants. After being finally granted British citizenship in 2013 Yousif switched his alliance to Britain and became a full-time professional athlete.

== Athletics career ==
In June 2002, he competed at the East Africa Youth Championships in Zanzibar and the Eastern African Junior Championships in Addis Ababa, winning a total of two gold medals in the high jump and one in the long jump. This qualified him for the World Junior Championships in Kingston, Jamaica. Guided by his British coach, Carol Williams, he switched from the high jump to the 400 metres, and won the British national junior championships in June 2004.

He finished third in the men's 400 metres event at the AAA Championships in 2005. He set a new record (45.72 seconds) at the 400 metres event of the Bedford International Games in 2007. He won the event again in 2008, with a time of 47.05 seconds.

In April 2008, despite an injury during training, he competed at the 2008 African Championships, and won a silver medal in the 4 × 400 m relay, setting a new national record of 3:04.00 with his teammates. He did not qualify for the Olympic Games. The 2009 World Championships in Athletics in Berlin were his first major world competition; he reached the semi-finals, with the best result of any African athlete (45.63). That same year, he won gold at the Arab Championships in Damascus, with a new personal best of 45.15. He won gold again at the All Africa Games and the Arab Championships in 2011.

In March 2012 he ran in the 400 metres at the World Indoor Championships in Istanbul but didn't qualify for the final. Later his results from the championships were disqualified for doping, as he had tested positive for cannabis in a competition on 23 February. He received a two-month backdated suspension for the anti-doping rule violation.

He qualified to join the Sudanese delegation at the 2012 Summer Olympics, and took part in the men's 400 metres. He reached the semi-finals, where he set a new personal best in 45.13.

In May 2013, he announced that he now had been granted a British passport, and aimed henceforth to represent Great Britain in future athletics events. His transfer of allegiance, allowing him to represent his new country, was completed by the following month. He represented GB in the 2014 European Athletics Championships, running the qualifying round of the 400m relay, helping his adopted country into the final with the fastest time. However, Yousif was not selected to run in the final, where GB won Gold.

In the 2015 World Championships Yousif ran a new personal best of 44.54 in the semi-final of the 400m to qualify for the final of the event. Yousif finished sixth in the final in 44.68 in the first ever race to comprise three men going under 44 seconds.

In May 2016, Yousif earned a European Athletics Championship bronze medal as part of the men's 400m relay team.

Yousif was selected to double up for the 2016 Olympics in both the 400m and 400m relay. However, having travelled to Rio, he was unable to take part in either event due to injury.
