= Ofentse Mogawane =

South African sprinter

Personal information
- Born: February 20, 1982 (age 44) Johannesburg
- Height: 1.88 m (6 ft 2 in)
- Weight: 69 kg (152 lb)

Sport
- Country: South Africa
- Sport: Athletics
- Event: 4 × 400m Relay
Medal record
Men's athletics
Representing South Africa
World Championships
Silver medal – second place	2011 Daegu	4×400 m
African Championships
Silver medal – second place	2006 Bambous	4×400 m
Silver medal – second place	2012 Porto-Novo	4×400 m
Bronze medal – third place	2016 Durban	4×400 m
Commonwealth Games
Silver medal – second place	2006 Melbourne	4x400 m

Ofentse Mogawane (born 20 February 1982) is a former South African sprinter who specialized in the 400 meters.

== Career ==
He finished sixth in the 2006 African Championships. He also competed at the 2005 World Championships and the 2006 Commonwealth Games without reaching the finals.

In 2007 Mogawane was found guilty of methylprednisolone doping. The sample was delivered on 22 June 2006 in an in-competition test in Algiers, Algeria. He received a public warning from the IAAF rather than a lengthy ban.

Mogawane was included in South African team and ran in the 4 × 400 m relay at the World Championships in Daegu, South Korea. South Africa advanced to the finals with a national record time of 2 minutes 59.21 seconds, and took Silver in the final.

At the 2012 Summer Olympics, Mogawane was part of the South African team in the 4x400 metres relay race first semifinal, where he ran the second leg. He fell and dislocated his shoulder when he collided with Kenya's Vincent Kiilu, resulting in South Africa's withdrawal from the race. South Africa was passed into the final on appeal to the IAAF, due to interference from the Kenyan athlete who downed Mogawane. They were assigned the 9th lane and finished in 8th place with their season's best time of 3:03.46.

== See also ==
- List of sportspeople sanctioned for doping offences
