= James Godday =

Nigerian sprinter (born 1984)

Medal record

Men's athletics

Representing Nigeria

Olympic Games
Bronze medal – third place	2004 Athens	4x400 m

African Championships
Silver medal – second place	2004 Brazzaville	4×400 m
Bronze medal – third place	2008 Addis Ababa	400 m
Bronze medal – third place	2010 Nairobi	4×400 m

James Godday (born 9 January 1984) is a Nigerian athlete who specializes in 400 metres. He was born in Kaduna.

Godday was a part of the Nigerian team that won the bronze medal in the 2004 Olympics 4 x 400 metres relay. In the 2005 World Championships in Helsinki, he competed in 400 metres where he was knocked out in the semi-finals with 46.62. He achieved a personal best in the heats with 45.30. He later improved this to 44.99 seconds, in February 2006 in Abuja.

Godday finished fifth at the 2006 African Championships and fourth at the 2007 All-Africa Games.
