= Athletics at the 2014 Commonwealth Games – Men's 100 metres =

Men's 100 metres at the 2014 Commonwealth Games
- Venue: Hampden Park
- Dates: 27–28 July
- Competitors: 76 from 40 nations
- Winning time: 10.00

Medalists
gold medal	Kemar Bailey-Cole	Jamaica
silver medal	Adam Gemili	England
bronze medal	Nickel Ashmeade	Jamaica

The Men's 100 metres at the 2014 Commonwealth Games, as part of the athletics programme, took place at Hampden Park on 27 and 28 July 2014. Kemar Bailey-Cole won the gold medal.

== Records ==
World Record	9.58	Usain Bolt	JAM	Berlin, Germany	16 August 2009
Games Record	9.88	Ato Boldon	TRI	Kuala Lumpur, Malaysia	17 September 1998

== First round ==
The first round consisted of nine heats, with qualification for the first two in each heat and the sixth fastest losers. However, due to a dead heat for second in Heat 7, three runners qualified automatically, and the fastest losers places were reduced to five. Adam Gemili was the fastest qualifier from the first round, at 10.15 seconds.

=== Heat 1 ===
Rank	Lane	Name	Reaction Time	Result	Notes
1	6	Kemar Bailey-Cole (JAM)	0.232	10.16	Q
2	5	Ramon Gittens (BAR)	0.161	10.34	Q
3	2	Jared Connaughton (CAN)	0.139	10.47	
4	7	Walter Moenga (KEN)	0.227	10.84	
5	3	Josh Hamilton (SVG)	0.205	10.85	
6	4	Masbah Ahmmed (BAN)	0.167	11.13	PB
7	8	Francis Manioru (SOL)	0.167	11.87	
	1	Idrissa Adam (CMR)	–	–	DNS
				Wind: +0.6 m/s	

=== Heat 2 ===
Rank	Lane	Name	Reaction Time	Result	Notes
1	3	Jason Livermore (JAM)	0.169	10.26	Q
2	8	Jason Rogers (SKN)	0.160	10.39	Q
3	4	Timothy Abeyie (GHA)	0.164	10.50	
4	1	Banuve Tabakaucoro (FIJ)	0.141	10.51	
5	7	Calvin Kang (SIN)	0.148	10.77	
6	2	Solomon Bockarie (SLE)	0.206	10.83	
7	5	Ruwan Gunasinghe (PNG)	0.211	11.03	
8	6	Kimorie Shearman (SVG)	0.190	11.04	
				Wind: −0.4 m/s	

=== Heat 3 ===
Rank	Lane	Name	Reaction Time	Result	Notes
1	2	Mark Jelks (NGR)	0.169	10.28	Q
2	6	Warren Fraser (BAH)	0.156	10.31	Q
3	5	Richard Thompson (TRI)	0.168	10.33	q
4	8	Muhammad Elfi Bin Mustapa (SIN)	0.174	10.94	
5	9	Kieron Rogers (AIA)	0.180	11.11	
6	4	Neddy Marie (SEY)	0.173	11.14	
7	3	Alphonse Binam Nlend (CMR)	0.243	11.34	
	1	Leon Reid (NIR)	–	–	DQ
	7	Tahir Walsh (ANT)	–	–	DQ
				Wind: −0.6 m/s	

=== Heat 4 ===
Rank	Lane	Name	Reaction Time	Result	Notes
1	1	Kemar Hyman (CAY)	0.174	10.20	Q
2	6	Antoine Adams (SKN)	0.154	10.31	Q
3	8	Harry Aikines-Aryeetey (ENG)	0.214	10.33	q
4	4	Bruno Matsenjwa (SWZ)	0.172	10.56	
5	5	Jason Smyth (NIR)	0.167	10.66	
6	2	Kupun Wisil (PNG)	0.222	10.86	
7	7	Courtney Carl Williams (SVG)	0.156	10.95	
8	3	Joshua Jeremiah (NRU)	0.212	11.46	
				Wind: +1.1 m/s	

=== Heat 5 ===
Rank	Lane	Name	Reaction Time	Result	Notes
1	2	Nickel Ashmeade (JAM)	0.218	10.40	Q
2	6	Adam Harris (GUY)	0.159	10.45	Q
3	8	Adrian Griffith (BAH)	0.216	10.46	
4	4	Ncincilili Titi (RSA)	0.158	10.48	=PB
5	5	Solomon Afful (GHA)	0.183	10.66	
6	9	Gary Yeo (SIN)	0.145	10.82	
7	1	Tony Chirchir (KEN)	0.172	10.85	
8	7	Alford Dyett (MNT)	0.175	11.13	PB
9	3	Shanoi Richardson (AIA)	0.176	11.56	SB
				Wind: +0.9 m/s	

=== Heat 6 ===
Rank	Lane	Name	Reaction Time	Result	Notes
1	1	Adam Gemili (ENG)	0.169	10.15	Q
2	2	Monzavous Edwards (NGR)	0.163	10.40	Q
3	7	Jonathan Permal (MRI)	0.159	10.46	PB
4	6	Titus Kafunda (ZAM)	0.140	10.53	
5	5	Jeremy Bascom (GUY)	0.151	10.58	
6	4	Siueni Filimone (TON)	0.192	10.72	PB
7	3	Eddie Hereme (SAM)	0.185	10.92	
	8	Darrel Brown (TRI)	–	–	DNS
				Wind: −0.8 m/s	

=== Heat 7 ===
Rank	Lane	Name	Reaction Time	Result	Notes
1	3	Daniel Bailey (ANT)	0.173	10.30	Q
=2	8	Richard Kilty (ENG)	0.150	10.34	Q
=2	4	Simon Magakwe (RSA)	0.201	10.34	Q
4	6	Corneil Lionel (LCA)	0.173	10.72	
5	7	Gibrilla Bangura (SLE)	0.151	10.79	
6	1	Lester Ryan (MNT)	0.163	10.99	
7	9	Michael Wilson (GRN)	0.192	11.00	
8	2	Mlandvo Shongwe (SWZ)	0.217	11.06	
9	5	Jerai Torres (GIB)	0.203	11.54	SB
				Wind: +0.5 m/s	

=== Heat 8 ===
Rank	Lane	Name	Reaction Time	Result	Notes
1	6	Akani Simbine (RSA)	0.141	10.32	Q
2	8	Ogho-Oghene Egwero (NGR)	0.170	10.38	Q
3	5	Aaron Brown (CAN)	0.207	10.39	q
4	7	Harold Houston (BER)	0.143	10.72	
5	3	Hassan Saaid (MDV)	0.133	10.79	
6	2	Chavaughn Walsh (ANT)	0.167	10.88	
7	1	Adel Sesay (SLE)	0.227	11.02	
8	4	Mark Anderson (BIZ)	0.196	11.23	
				Wind: −0.6 m/s	

=== Heat 9 ===
Rank	Lane	Name	Reaction Time	Result	Notes
1	5	Keston Bledman (TRI)	0.160	10.16	Q
2	1	Shavez Hart (BAH)	0.152	10.32	Q
3	8	Dontae Richards-Kwok (CAN)	0.167	10.36	q, SB
4	7	Brijesh Lawrence (SKN)	0.173	10.43	q
5	2	Julius Morris (MNT)	0.163	10.55	SB
6	4	Paul Williams (GRN)	0.182	10.70	
7	6	Stephen Wafula Barasa (KEN)	0.174	10.81	
8	9	Leroy Henriette (SEY)	0.219	11.12	
9	3	Nooa Takooa (KIR)	0.141	11.56	
				Wind: +0.2 m/s	

== Semifinals ==
Three semi-finals were held, with automatic qualification restricted to the first two finishers in each heat, and the next two fastest athletes across the three semi-finals. Kemar Bailey-Cole was the fastest qualifier in 10.00 seconds.

=== Heat 1 ===
Rank	Lane	Name	Reaction Time	Result	Notes
1	6	Warren Fraser (BAH)	0.163	10.21	Q
2	5	Nickel Ashmeade (JAM)	0.151	10.21	Q
3	3	Keston Bledman (TRI)	0.148	10.24	
4	2	Harry Aikines-Aryeetey (ENG)	0.162	10.25	
5	1	Jason Rogers (SKN)	0.164	10.30	
6	4	Kemar Hyman (CAY)	0.155	10.31	
7	8	Simon Magakwe (RSA)	0.158	10.33	
8	7	Ogho-Oghene Egwero (NGR)	0.159	10.40	
				Wind: 0.0	

=== Heat 2 ===
Rank	Lane	Name	Reaction Time	Result	Notes
1	5	Adam Gemili (ENG)	0.174	10.07	Q
2	4	Jason Livermore (JAM)	0.140	10.11	Q
3	3	Mark Jelks (NGR)	0.161	10.13	q, =SB
4	7	Ramon Gittens (BAR)	0.145	10.15	Q
5	8	Aaron Brown (CAN)	0.162	10.17	
6	2	Adam Harris (GUY)	0.165	10.23	
7	6	Shavez Hart (BAH)	0.151	10.29	
8	1	Brijesh Lawrence (SKN)	0.158	10.49	
				Wind: +0.7 m/s	

=== Heat 3 ===
Rank	Lane	Name	Reaction Time	Result	Notes
1	4	Kemar Bailey-Cole (JAM)	0.175	10.00	q, SB
2	3	Antoine Adams (SKN)	0.128	10.18	Q
3	2	Richard Thompson (TRI)	0.155	10.19	
4	5	Akani Simbine (RSA)	0.138	10.21	
5	6	Daniel Bailey (ANT)	0.159	10.22	
6	7	Richard Kilty (ENG)	0.130	10.27	
7	1	Monzavous Edwards (NGR)	0.171	10.30	
8	8	Dontae Richards-Kwok (CAN)	0.149	10.42	
				Wind: −0.5 m/s	

== Final ==
Rank	Lane	Name	Reaction Time	Result	Notes
1st place, gold medalist(s)	5	Kemar Bailey-Cole (JAM)	0.190	10.00	=SB
2nd place, silver medalist(s)	4	Adam Gemili (ENG)	0.144	10.10	
3rd place, bronze medalist(s)	8	Nickel Ashmeade (JAM)	0.145	10.12	
4	7	Antoine Adams (SKN)	0.154	10.16	
5	1	Mark Jelks (NGR)	0.151	10.17	
6	6	Jason Livermore (JAM)	0.139	10.18	
7	3	Warren Fraser (BAH)	0.168	10.20	
8	2	Ramon Gittens (BAR)	0.158	10.25	
				Wind: 0.0	
