= 2014 African Championships in Athletics – Men's 100 metres =

The men's 100 metres event at the 2014 African Championships in Athletics was held August 10–11 on Stade de Marrakech.

== Medalists ==
Gold	Silver	Bronze
Hua Wilfried Koffi; Ivory Coast	Mark Jelks; Nigeria	Monzavous Edwards; Nigeria

== Results ==
=== Heats ===
Qualification: First 3 of each heat (Q) and the next 3 fastest (q) qualified for the semifinals.

Wind: Heat 1: -0.3 m/s, Heat 2: -0.6 m/s, Heat 3: -0.7 m/s, Heat 4: -1.1 m/s, Heat 5: -0.4 m/s, Heat 6: -1.3 m/s, Heat 7: +0.6 m/s

Rank	Heat	Name	Nationality	Time	Notes
1	2	Hua Wilfried Koffi	Ivory Coast	10.29	Q
2	6	Ogho-Oghene Egwero	Nigeria	10.34	Q
3	7	Akani Simbine	South Africa	10.35	Q
4	5	Simon Magakwe	South Africa	10.38	Q
5	7	Emmanuel Dassor	Ghana	10.41	Q
5	3	Mark Jelks	Nigeria	10.41	Q
7	7	Idrissa Adam	Cameroon	10.43	Q
8	4	Solomon Afful	Ghana	10.44	Q
9	3	Tim Abeyie	Ghana	10.46	Q
10	1	Jammeh Adama	Gambia	10.49	Q
10	4	Monzavous Edwards	Nigeria	10.49	Q
10	5	Aziz Ouhadi	Morocco	10.49	Q
13	6	Béranger Aymard Bosse	Central African Republic	10.55	Q
14	6	Titus Kafunda	Zambia	10.55	Q
15	4	Henricho Bruintjies	South Africa	10.55	Q
16	1	Moustapha Traoré	Mali	10.58	Q
17	6	Jonathan Permal	Mauritius	10.60	q
17	7	Yendoutien Tiebekabe	Togo	10.60	q
19	2	Skander Djamil Athmani	Algeria	10.62	Q
19	7	Holder da Silva	Guinea-Bissau	10.62	q
21	7	Stephen Barasa	Kenya	10.66	
22	5	Pierre Paul Bissek	Cameroon	10.67	Q
22	6	Yateya Kambepera	Botswana	10.67	
24	6	Francis Zimwara	Zimbabwe	10.68	
25	5	Gogbeu Francis Koné	Ivory Coast	10.69	
26	1	Gue Arthur Cissé	Ivory Coast	10.72	Q
26	5	Moulaye Sonko	Senegal	10.72	
28	3	Even Tjiviju	Namibia	10.74	Q
29	2	Sibusiso Matsenjwa	Swaziland	10.76	Q
30	5	Jean Yann de Grace	Mauritius	10.78	
31	4	Dannys Assoumou	Gabon	10.80	
32	2	Jean Tarcisus Batambock	Cameroon	10.84	
33	4	Mohamed El Shushin	Libya	10.87	
34	4	Brisso Bahorou Akim	Benin	10.94	
35	5	Tonny Chirchir	Kenya	10.95	
35	2	Leeroy Henriette	Seychelles	10.95	
37	3	Didier Kiki	Benin	10.96	
38	1	Zenebe Madfu	Ethiopia	11.00	
39	3	João Manu de Barros	São Tomé and Príncipe	11.03	
40	2	Abyot Lencho	Ethiopia	11.08	
40	4	Hamza Mlaab	Morocco	11.08	
42	6	Dylan Sicobo	Seychelles	11.22	
43	3	Jidou El Moctar	Mauritania	11.58	
44	1	Osman Tahir	Eritrea	11.88	
45	6	Yanis Dallay	Comoros	12.84	
	7	Hamza Ouahbi	Morocco	DNF	
	3	Walter Moenga	Kenya	DQ	R162.6
	1	Mauro Gaspar	Angola	DNS	
	1	Alexandre Mandaba	Central African Republic	DNS	
	2	Oumar Sabour	Chad	DNS	
	4	Osvaldo Alexandre	Angola	DNS	

=== Semifinals ===
Qualification: First 2 of each semifinal (Q) and the next 2 fastest (q) qualified for the final.

Wind: Heat 1: -1.2 m/s, Heat 2: +1.6 m/s, Heat 3: -0.2 m/s

Rank	Heat	Name	Nationality	Time	Notes
1	2	Mark Jelks	Nigeria	10.16	Q
2	1	Hua Wilfried Koffi	Ivory Coast	10.17	Q
3	2	Akani Simbine	South Africa	10.27	Q
4	2	Aziz Ouhadi	Morocco	10.33	q
5	3	Simon Magakwe	South Africa	10.36	Q
6	3	Ogho-Oghene Egwero	Nigeria	10.37	Q
7	1	Monzavous Edwards	Nigeria	10.38	Q
7	2	Tim Abeyie	Ghana	10.38	q
9	1	Jammeh Adama	Gambia	10.41	
10	1	Henricho Bruintjies	South Africa	10.44	
11	1	Solomon Afful	Ghana	10.46	
12	2	Jonathan Permal	Mauritius	10.49	
13	2	Idrissa Adam	Cameroon	10.50	
14	3	Béranger Aymard Bosse	Central African Republic	10.52	
15	3	Emmanuel Dassor	Ghana	10.52	
16	2	Titus Kafunda	Zambia	10.58	
17	3	Yendoutien Tiebekabe	Togo	10.63	
18	1	Even Tjiviju	Namibia	10.66	
19	1	Holder da Silva	Guinea-Bissau	10.66	
20	1	Moustapha Traoré	Mali	10.74	
21	2	Sibusiso Matsenjwa	Swaziland	10.80	
21	3	Skander Djamil Athmani	Algeria	10.80	
23	3	Gue Arthur Cissé	Ivory Coast	10.86	
	3	Pierre Paul Bissek	Cameroon	DNS	

=== Final ===
Wind: +0.4 m/s

Rank	Lane	Name	Nationality	Time	Notes
1st place, gold medalist(s)	3	Hua Wilfried Koffi	Ivory Coast	10.05	NR
2nd place, silver medalist(s)	6	Mark Jelks	Nigeria	10.07	
3rd place, bronze medalist(s)	7	Monzavous Edwards	Nigeria	10.16	
4	5	Simon Magakwe	South Africa	10.19	
5	8	Ogho-Oghene Egwero	Nigeria	10.28	
6	1	Aziz Ouhadi	Morocco	10.29	
7	2	Tim Abeyie	Ghana	10.40	
8	4	Akani Simbine	South Africa	13.14	
