= Athletics at the 2014 Commonwealth Games – Men's 4 × 100 metres relay =

Men's 4 × 100 metres relay at the Commonwealth Games

The Men's 4 × 100 metres relay at the 2014 Commonwealth Games, as part of the athletics programme, took place at Hampden Park on 1 and 2 August 2014.

== Heats ==
=== Heat 1 ===
Rank	Nation	Members	Result	Notes	Qual.
1	Trinidad and Tobago	Keston Bledman; Marc Burns; Rondel Sorrillo; Richard Thompson	38.33		Q
2	Canada	Gavin Smellie; Aaron Brown; Dontae Richards-Kwok; Andre De Grasse	38.41		Q
3	Bahamas	Adrian Griffith; Warren Fraser; Shavez Hart; Teray Smith	38.52		q
4	Kenya	Walter Moenga; Carvin Nkanata; Tony Chirchir; Collins Omae Gichana	40.32		
5	Cayman Islands	Kemar Hyman; Tyrell Cuffy; David Hamil; Troy Long	40.50		
6	Sierra Leone	Adel Sesay; Gibrilla Bangura; Jimmy Thoronka; Soloman Bockarie	40.55		

=== Heat 2 ===
Rank	Nation	Members	Result	Notes	Qual.
1	Jamaica	Kimmari Roach; Julian Forte; Nickel Ashmeade; Usain Bolt	38.99		Q
2	Nigeria	Ogho-Oghene Egwero; Monzavous Edwards; Obinna Metu; Mark Jelks	39.11		Q
3	Singapore	Calvin Kang; Muhammad Elfi Bin Mustapa; Chengwei Lee; Muhammad Naqib Bin Asmin	40.05		
4	Saint Vincent and the Grenadines	Josh Hamilton; Courtney Carl Williams; Kimorie Shearman; Reuberth Boyde	40.47		
5	Australia	Nicholas Hough; Jarrod Geddes; Jake Hammond; Tim Leathart	DQ		
6	Montserrat	Arlen Skerritt; Ryan Lester; Julius Morris; Alford Dyett	DQ		

=== Heat 3 ===
Rank	Nation	Members	Result	Notes	Qual.
1	England	James Ellington; Harry Aikines-Aryeetey; Richard Kilty; Andrew Robertson	38.78		Q
2	South Africa	Henricho Bruintjies; Simon Magakwe; Ncincilili Titi; Simbine Akani	38.91		Q
3	Antigua and Barbuda	Cejhae Greene; Daniel Bailey; Kasheem Colbourne; Miguel Francis	39.48		q
4	Papua New Guinea	Nelson Stone; Wala Gime; Theo Piniau; Kupun Wisil	41.07		
5	Saint Kitts and Nevis	Delwayne Delaney; Jason Rogers; Brijesh Lawrence; Allistar Clarke	DNF		
6	Guyana	Jeremy Bascom; Stephan James; Winston George; Adam Harris	DQ		

== Finals ==
Rank	Nation	Members	Result	Notes
1st place, gold medalist(s)	Jamaica	Jason Livermore; Kemar Bailey-Cole; Nickel Ashmeade; Usain Bolt	37.58	GR
2nd place, silver medalist(s)	England	Adam Gemili; Harry Aikines-Aryeetey; Richard Kilty; Danny Talbot	38.02	
3rd place, bronze medalist(s)	Trinidad and Tobago	Keston Bledman; Marc Burns; Rondel Sorrillo; Richard Thompson	38.10	
4	South Africa	Henricho Bruintjies; Simon Magakwe; Ncincilili Titi; Akani Simbine	38.35	
5	Bahamas	Adrian Griffith; Shavez Hart; Warren Fraser; Teray Smith	39.16	
6	Nigeria	Ejowvokoghene Oduduru; Monzavous Edwards; Obinna Metu; Mark Jelks	40.17	
7	Antigua and Barbuda	Cejhae Greene; Daniel Bailey; Kasheem Colbourne; Miguel Francis	40.45	
8	Canada	Gavin Smellie; Aaron Brown; Dontae Richards-Kwok; Andre De Grasse	DNF	
