= 2014 African Championships in Athletics – Men's 4 × 100 metres relay =

The men's 4 × 100 metres relay event at the 2014 African Championships in Athletics was held August 11–12 on Stade de Marrakech.

== Medalists ==
Gold	Silver	Bronze
Nigeria; Ogho-Oghene Egwero; Monzavous Edwards; Obinna Metu; Mark Jelks; Divine Oduduru*; Seye Ogunlewe*	Ghana; Daniel Gyasi; Solomon Afful; Emmanuel Dassor; Tim Abeyie	Algeria; Mahmoud Hammoudi; Ali Bouguesba; Skander Djamil Athmani; Soufiane Bouhadda

* Athletes who competed in heats only and received medals.

== Results ==
=== Heats ===
Qualification: First 3 teams of each heat (Q) plus the next 2 fastest (q) qualified for the final.

Rank	Heat	Nation	Athletes	Time	Notes
1	1	Nigeria	Divine Oduduru, Monzavous Edwards, Obinna Metu, Seye Ogunlewe	39.51	Q
2	1	Ghana	Daniel Gyasi, Solomon Afful, Emmanuel Dassor, Tim Abeyie	39.64	Q
3	2	Algeria	Mahmoud Hammoudi, Ali Bouguesba, Skander Djamil Athmani, Soufiane Bouhadda	40.43	Q
4	2	Kenya	Stephen Barasa, Solomon Buoga, Tony Chirchir, Walter Moenga	40.58	Q
5	2	Senegal	Mamadou Gueye, Moulaye Sonko, Moussa Dembélé, Daouda Diagne	40.95	Q
6	1	Cameroon	Jean Tarcisus Batambock, Emmanuel Fortsi, Armand Tsoaoule, Idrissa Adam	41.06	Q
7	2	Angola	Mauro Gaspar, Osvaldo Alexandre, Prisca Baltazar, Kevin Oliveira	41.30	q
8	1	Seychelles	Dylan Sicobo, Ned Azemia, Neddy Marie, Leeroy Henriette	41.86	q
	2	South Africa	Henricho Bruintjies, Simon Magakwe, Akani Simbine, Ncincihli Titi	DQ	R170.7
	1	Ivory Coast		DNS	
	1	Mali		DNS	
	1	Morocco		DNS	
	2	Ethiopia		DNS	
	2	Republic of the Congo		DNS	

=== Final ===
Rank	Lane	Nation	Competitors	Time	Notes
1st place, gold medalist(s)	4	Nigeria	Ogho-Oghene Egwero, Monzavous Edwards, Obinna Metu, Mark Jelks	38.80	
2nd place, silver medalist(s)	6	Ghana	Daniel Gyasi, Solomon Afful, Emmanuel Dassor, Tim Abeyie	39.28	
3rd place, bronze medalist(s)	5	Algeria	Mahmoud Hammoudi, Ali Bouguesba, Skander Djamil Athmani, Soufiane Bouhadda	39.89	NR
4	3	Kenya	Stephen Barasa, Solomon Buoga, Tony Chirchir, Walter Moenga	40.10	
5	1	Angola	Mauro Gaspar, Osvaldo Alexandre, Prisca Baltazar, Kevin Oliveira	40.41	NR
5	8	Cameroon	Armand Tsoaoule, Jean Tarcisus Batambock, Pierre Paul Bissek, Idrissa Adam	40.42	
7	7	Senegal	Moussa Dembélé, Amadou Ndiaye, Daouda Diagne, Moulaye Sonko	40.50	
	2	Seychelles		DNS	
