= Divine Oduduru =

Nigerian sprinter (born 1996)

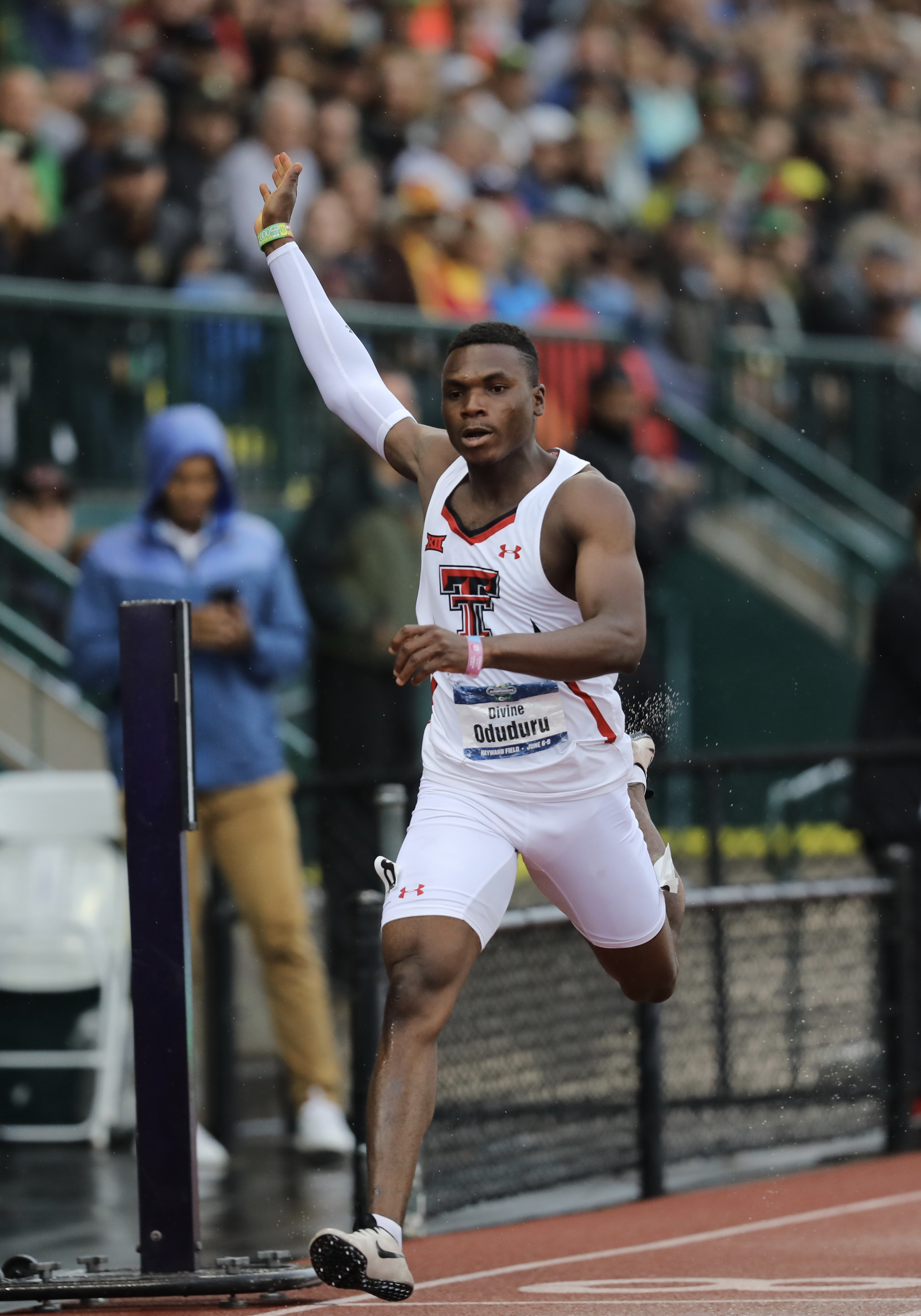
- Oduduru winning the 200 m at the 2018 NCAA Division I Championships

Personal information
- Full name: Ejowvokoghene Divine Oduduru
- Born: 7 October 1996 (age 29) Ughelli, Delta State, Nigeria
- Years active: 2007 – present
- Height: 170 cm (5 ft 7 in)
- Weight: 70 kg (154 lb)

Sport
- Country: Nigeria
- Sport: Athletics
- Sprints: 100 meters, 200 m
- College team: Texas Tech Red Raiders (2018, 2019)
- Team: Puma
- Turned pro: 2019
- Coached by: Wes Kittley; Calvin Robinson

Achievements and titles
- Personal bests: 100 m: 9.86 (2019); 200 m: 19.73 NR (2019); Indoors; 60 m: 6.52i (2019); 200 m: 20.08i NR (2019)
Medal record
Men's athletics
Representing Nigeria
African Championships
Gold medal – first place	2014 Marrakesh	4×100 m relay
Silver medal – second place	2018 Asaba	200 m
Silver medal – second place	2018 Asaba	4×100 m relay
African Games
Silver medal – second place	2015 Brazzaville	200 m
Silver medal – second place	2019 Rabat	4×100 m relay
Silver medal – second place	2019 Rabat	200 m
World Junior Championships
Silver medal – second place	2014 Oregon	200 m
African Junior Championships
Gold medal – first place	2015 Addis Ababa	100 m
Gold medal – first place	2015 Addis Ababa	200 m
Gold medal – first place	2013 Réduit	200 m
Gold medal – first place	2015 Addis Ababa	4×100 m relay
Gold medal – first place	2013 Réduit	4×100 m relay
African Youth Championships
Gold medal – first place	2013 Warri	100 m
Gold medal – first place	2013 Warri	200 m
Bronze medal – third place	2013 Warri	Medley relay
- Updated on 3 February 2023

Ejowvokoghene Divine Oduduru (born 7 October 1996) is a Nigerian sprinter specializing in the 100-meter and 200-meter dash. He holds personal bests of 9.86 seconds for the 100 m and 19.73 seconds for the 200 m. The latter is a Nigerian national record.

In age category competitions, he was a twice-champion at the African Youth Athletics Championships, a five-time African Junior Champion in the sprints and the 200 m silver medallist at the 2014 World Junior Championships. He represented his country as a senior athlete at the 2014 Commonwealth Games and 2014 African Championships in Athletics, before winning 200 m silver medals at the 2015 and 2019 African Games as well as the 2018 African Championships.

He is a two-time Nigerian national champion and is a four-time NCAA champion in American collegiate competition, running for the Texas Tech Red Raiders. He is sponsored by Puma.

Oduduru is currently serving a six-year ban set to expire in February 2029 for anti-doping rule violations.

== Career ==
=== Under-20 competition ===
He was the gold medalist in both the 100 metres and 200 metres at the 2013 African Youth Athletics Championships. He was a finalist in the 200 m at the 2013 World Youth Championships in Athletics. He won the 200 m at the 2013 African Junior Championships and was also a member of the Gold medal winning 4 × 100 m relay quartet. He successfully defended his 200 m title at the 2015 African Junior Championships and also added the 100 m and 4 × 100 m gold medals to his tally. This made him a five-time African Junior Champion.

Oduduru became known for his interviews, with his interviews at the 2013 World Youth Championships in Athletics gaining popularity among fans, including his phrase 'deadly day'. Memes and videos have been generated using his responses to journalists. He lamented the inadequate support for Nigerian athletes and made a plea for sponsorship during the 2016 Nigeria Championships.

In 2014, he dipped under 21 seconds for the first time. He became the Nigerian National Champion in the 200 metres. After setting a PB of 20.66 s in the semifinals at the 2014 World Junior Championships, he went on to win the silver medal in a windy 20.25 s behind Trentavis Friday of the US.

=== Senior career ===
He led off the Nigerian 4x100 metres relay team at the 2014 Commonwealth Games, a team supported by former American athletes, Monzavous Edwards and Mark Jelks, who were running for Nigeria in their first international relay.

Due to illness, he pulled out of the 2015 Nigerian Championships and could not defend his 200 m title. He, however, bounced back for the All-Africa Games in Brazzaville. Oduduru ran a PB of 20.45 s into a headwind of 1.2 m/s to win the silver medal behind Ivorian sprinter, Hua Wilfried Koffi. His team mate and 2015 Nigerian champion Tega Odele placed third. Oduduru was selected for the 200 m at the 2016 African Championships in Durban. After posting the second-fastest time in the semifinals, he did not run in the finals due to injury.

At the 2018 Michael Johnson Invitational meet in Waco, Texas, Divine improved his personal best in the 100 m to 10.10 s, improving the Texas Tech school record by 0.01 s. A year later at the same meet he improved his personal bests and set world-leading times of 9.94 s and 19.76 s, in the 100 m and 200 m respectively. His time in the 200 m broke the national record of 19.84 s set by Francis Obikwelu in 1999.

During 2019, he focused mainly on collegiate competition. He set a personal best in the 60-meter dash at the 2019 Big 12 Indoor Championships, running 6.52 seconds for the distance to win the regional title. He also won the 200 m Big 12 Indoor title. At the 2019 NCAA Division I Indoor Track and Field Championships he won the 200 m title and placed seventh in the 60 m final. At the Big 12 Outdoor Championships, he won the 100 m in 9.99 seconds, having broken the 10-second barrier for the first time at the earlier Michael Johnson Invitational meet. He also helped the Texas Tech Red Raiders to the 4 × 100 m relay title. At the 2019 NCAA Division I Outdoor Track and Field Championships, he won a sprint double in the 100 m and 200 m, as well as taking third in the 4 × 100 m relay. His 100 m time of 9.86 seconds was the fastest in the world at that point of the season, and his 200 m time of 19.73 seconds was a championships record.

Oduduru made his debut on the 2019 IAAF Diamond League circuit at the 2019 Herculis meet, but finished in last place.

=== Doping ban ===
In October 2023, Oduduru was issued with a six-year ban for anti-doping rule violations relating to use of human growth hormones and EPO. The ban is set to run until February 2029 with all of his results from July 12, 2021 were disqualified. The investigation was connected to the case of Blessing Okagbare, his compatriot who was banned for 11 years in 2022.

== Statistics ==
- Information from World Athletics profile.

=== Personal bests ===
Event	Time	Wind	Venue	Date	Notes
60 m indoor	6.52 i	—N/a	Lubbock, TX, U.S.	23 February 2019	
100 m	9.86	+0.8 m/s	Austin, TX, U.S.	7 June 2019	
200 m	19.73	+0.8 m/s	Austin, TX, U.S.	7 June 2019	NR
200 m indoor	20.08 i	—N/a	Lubbock, TX, U.S.	23 February 2019	NR #3 all time
4×100 m relay	38.45	—N/a	Austin, Texas, U.S.	7 June 2019	

=== Seasonal bests ===
Year	100 metres	200 metres
2013	10.61	21.13
2014	10.39	20.66
2015	10.37	20.45
2016	10.25	20.34
2017	10.09 w	20.45 w
2018	10.10	20.13
2019	9.86	19.73
2020	10.10	20.22
2021	10.05	19.88

=== International competitions ===
Representing Nigeria
Year	Competition	Venue	Position	Event	Time	Wind (m/s)	Notes
2013	African Youth Championships	Warri, Nigeria	1st	100 m	10.62	+0.7	
2013	African Youth Championships	Warri, Nigeria	1st	200 m	21.56	−1.5	PB
2013	African Youth Championships	Warri, Nigeria	3rd	Medley relay	1:54.58	—N/a	PB
2013	World Youth Championships	Donetsk, Ukraine	21st	100 m	11.05	−1.3	
2013	World Youth Championships	Donetsk, Ukraine	1st (semi 2)	Medley relay	1:52.90	—N/a	Q (Note: The team qualified for the final with Oduduru in the semis, but he was replaced in the final with another runner; The squad that ran in the final finished 7th.), PB
2013	World Youth Championships	Donetsk, Ukraine	6th	200 m	21.37	−1.0	
2013	African Junior Championships	Réduit, Mauritius	1st	4×100 m relay	40.36	—N/a	PB
2013	African Junior Championships	Réduit, Mauritius	1st	200 m	21.19	−3.6	
2014	World Junior Championships	Eugene, OR, United States	2nd	200 m	20.25 w	+2.3	Wind-assisted
2014	World Junior Championships	Eugene, OR, United States	5th	4×100 m relay	39.66	—N/a	PB
2014	Commonwealth Games	Glasgow, Scotland	6th	4×100 m relay	40.17	—N/a	
2014	African Championships	Marrakesh, Morocco	1st (semi 1)	4×100 m relay	39.51	—N/a	Q (Note: The team qualified for the final with Oduduru in the semis, but he was replaced with another runner in the final; The squad that ran in the final finished first, earning the team gold medals.), PB
2014	African Championships	Marrakesh, Morocco	6th	200 m	20.81	−0.8	
2015	African Junior Championships	Addis Ababa, Ethiopia	1st	100 m	10.44	−1.1	SB
2015	African Junior Championships	Addis Ababa, Ethiopia	1st	200 m	21.22	−2.3	
2015	African Junior Championships	Addis Ababa, Ethiopia	1st	4×100 m relay	39.99	—N/a	SB
2015	World Relays	Nassau, Bahamas	DQ (semi 1)	4×200 m relay	—	—N/a	Passing outside zone
2015	African Games	Brazzaville, Republic of the Congo	1st (semi 2)	4×100 m relay	38.97	—N/a	Q (Note: The team qualified for the final with Oduduru in the semis, but he was replaced with another runner in the final; The squad that ran in the final was disqualified.), PB
2015	African Games	Brazzaville, Republic of the Congo	2nd	200 m	20.45	−1.2	PB
2016	African Championships	Durban, South Africa	1st (semi 3)	200 m	20.48	+1.6	Q (Note: Qualified for the final, but did not start (DNS) in it.)
2016	Olympic Games	Rio de Janeiro, Brazil	20th	200 m	20.59	−0.3	
2018	African Championships	Asaba, Nigeria	2nd	4×100 m relay	38.74	—N/a	PB
2018	African Championships	Asaba, Nigeria	2nd	200 m	20.60	NWI	
2019	African Games	Rabat, Morocco	2nd	4×100 m relay	38.59	—N/a	
2019	African Games	Rabat, Morocco	2nd	200 m	20.54	−0.8	
2019	World Championships	Doha, Qatar	22nd (sf)	200 m	20.84	−0.1	
2021	Olympic Games	Tokyo, Japan	DQ (heat 5)	100 m	—	+0.6	False start
2021	Olympic Games	Tokyo, Japan	9th (sf)	200 m	20.16	−0.2	

=== National competitions ===
Representing the Texas Tech Red Raiders (2018–2019)
Year	Competition	Venue	Position	Event	Time	Wind (m/s)	Notes
2014	Nigerian Championships	Calabar, Cross River, Nigeria	6th	100 m	10.54	−2.3	
2014	Nigerian Championships	Calabar, Cross River, Nigeria	1st	200 m	20.87	−1.3	
2016	Nigerian Championships	Sapele, Delta, Nigeria	2nd	100 m	10.25	0.0	PB
2016	Nigerian Championships	Sapele, Delta, Nigeria	1st	200 m	20.51	0.0	
2018	NCAA Division I Indoor Championships	College Station, Texas, U.S.	6th	60 m	6.62	—N/a	
2018	NCAA Division I Indoor Championships	College Station, Texas, U.S.	2nd	200 m	20.21	—N/a	
2018	NCAA Division I Championships	Eugene, Oregon, U.S.	11th	100 m	10.12	+1.2	
2018	NCAA Division I Championships	Eugene, Oregon, U.S.	13th	4×100 m relay	39.37	—N/a	
2018	NCAA Division I Championships	Eugene, Oregon, U.S.	1st	200 m	20.28	0.0	
2019	NCAA Division I Indoor Championships	Birmingham, Alabama, U.S.	7th	60 m	6.62	—N/a	
2019	NCAA Division I Indoor Championships	Birmingham, Alabama, U.S.	1st	200 m	20.49	—N/a	
2019	NCAA Division I Championships	Austin, Texas, U.S.	3rd	4×100 m relay	38.45	—N/a	PB
2019	NCAA Division I Championships	Austin, Texas, U.S.	1st	100 m	9.86	+0.8	WL, PB
2019	NCAA Division I Championships	Austin, Texas, U.S.	1st	200 m	19.73	+0.8	NR, CR, PB

- NCAA results from Track & Field Results Reporting System.

=== Track records ===
As of September 2024, Oduduru holds the following track records for 100 metres and 200 metres.

==== 100 metres ====
Location	Time	Windspeed m/s	Date
Norman	9.99	+ 0.3	12/05/2019
Waco	9.94	+ 0.8	20/04/2019

==== 200 metres ====
Location	Time	Windspeed m/s	Date
Austin, Texas	19.73; NR	+ 0.8	07/06/2019
Waco	19.76	+ 0.8	20/04/2019

== See also ==
- 2019 in 100 metres
