= Athletics at the 2015 African Games – Men's 4 × 400 metres relay =

The men's 4 × 400 metres relay event at the 2015 African Games was held on 16 and 17 September.

== Medalists ==
Gold	Silver	Bronze
Kenya; Raymond Kibet; Alex Sampao; Kiprono Koskei; Boniface Mweresa	Botswana; Onkabetse Nkobolo; Nijel Amos; Leaname Maotoanong; Isaac Makwala	Algeria; Miloud Laradt; Miloud Rahmani; Sofiane Bouhedda; Abdelmalik Lahoulou

== Results ==
=== Heats ===
Qualification: First 3 teams of each heat (Q) plus the next 2 fastest (q) qualified for the final.

Rank	Heat	Nation	Athletes	Time	Notes
1	1	Kenya	Raymond Kibet, Alex Sampao, Kiprono Koskei, Boniface Mweresa	3:04.72	Q
2	1	Botswana	Onkabetse Nkobolo, Nijel Amos, Leaname Maotoanong, Isaac Makwala	3:05.55	Q
3	2	Nigeria	Samson Oghenewegba Nathaniel, Robert Simmonson, Henry Okorie, Orukpe Erayokan	3:07.33	Q
4	2	Ghana	George Effah, Daniel Gyasi, Alex Amankwah, Emmanuel Dasor	3:08.23	Q
5	2	Algeria	Miloud Laradt, Miloud Rahmani, Sofiane Bouhedda, Abdelmalik Lahoulou	3:09.12	Q
6	2	Ethiopia	Kenenisa Hailu, Mohammed Gemechu, Fikru Abu, Haji Ture	3:10.25	q
7	1	Senegal	Mathieu Faye, David Leon Basse, Ousmane Sidibé, Mamadou Gueye	3:10.73	Q
8	1	Uganda	Leonard Opiny, Denis Opio, Jimmy Adar, Musa Isabirje	3:12.07	q
9	2	Congo	Fleury Oboba, Gustave Ndadobo, Bamja Ikounga Ndinga, Gilles Anthony Afoumba	3:13.16	SB
10	1	Chad	Zakaria Djarma, Abdallah Albain Abbo, Haroun Oumar, Mahamat Bachir Ahmat	3:18.86	SB
	1	Sudan		DNS	

=== Final ===
Rank	Nation	Athletes	Time	Notes
1st place, gold medalist(s)	Kenya	Raymond Kibet, Alex Sampao, Kiprono Koskei, Boniface Mweresa	3:00.34	GR
2nd place, silver medalist(s)	Botswana	Onkabetse Nkobolo, Nijel Amos, Leaname Maotoanong, Isaac Makwala	3:00.95	NR
3rd place, bronze medalist(s)	Algeria	Miloud Laradt, Miloud Rahmani, Sofiane Bouhedda, Abdelmalik Lahoulou	3:03.07	
4	Nigeria	Samson Oghenewegba Nathaniel, Robert Simmonson, Henry Okorie, Orukpe Erayokan	3:03.52	
5	Ghana	George Effah, Daniel Gyasi, Alex Amankwah, Emmanuel Dasor	3:05.15	
6	Senegal	Mathieu Faye, David Leon Basse, Ousmane Sidibé, Mamadou Gueye	3:07.73	
7	Ethiopia	Kenenisa Hailu, Mohammed Gemechu, Fikru Abu, Haji Ture	3:09.75	
8	Uganda	Leonard Opiny, Denis Opio, Jimmy Adar, Musa Isabirje	3:11.53	
