= Athletics at the 2015 African Games – Men's 400 metres =

The men's 400 metres event at the 2015 African Games was held between 13 and 15 September.

== Medalists ==
Gold	Silver	Bronze
Isaac Makwala; Botswana	Boniface Mweresa; Kenya	Onkabetse Nkobolo; Botswana

== Results ==
=== Heats ===
Qualification: First 4 in each heat (Q) and the next 8 fastest (q) advanced to the semifinals.

Rank	Heat	Name	Nationality	Time	Notes
1	3	Onkabetse Nkobolo	Botswana	45.46	Q
2	4	Isaac Makwala	Botswana	45.63	Q
3	4	Boniface Mweresa	Kenya	45.83	Q
4	3	Orukpe Erayokan	Nigeria	45.84	Q
5	1	Sadam Elnour	Sudan	45.85	Q
6	2	Alex Sampao	Kenya	46.10	Q
7	3	Saviour Kombe	Zambia	46.12	Q
8	1	Samson Oghenewegba Nathaniel	Nigeria	46.24	Q
9	2	Emmanuel Dasor	Ghana	46.27	Q
10	4	Rodwell Ndhlovu	Zimbabwe	46.40	Q
11	3	Daniel Gyasi	Ghana	46.43	Q
12	4	Robert Simmonson	Nigeria	46.60	Q
13	1	Raymond Kibet	Kenya	46.67	Q
14	2	Ofentse Mogawane	South Africa	46.70	Q
15	1	George Effah	Ghana	46.79	Q
16	2	Ernst Narib	Namibia	47.07	Q
17	1	Leaname Maotoanong	Botswana	47.16	q
18	4	Kenenisa Hailu	Ethiopia	47.19	q
18	3	Mahamat Bachir Ahmat	Chad	47.19	q, SB
20	3	Denis Opio	Uganda	47.27	q
21	2	Diakalia Bamba	Mali	47.39	q
22	3	Mamadou Gueye	Senegal	47.49	q
23	1	Marie Heddy	Seychelles	47.70	q
24	4	Mohamed Khouaja	Libya	47.82	q
25	1	Leonard Opiny	Uganda	48.40	
26	4	Gustave Ndadobo	Republic of the Congo	48.59	
27	2	Haji Ture	Ethiopia	49.01	
28	1	Fasum Tesfahuney	Eritrea	49.54	
29	1	Joseph Sinkala	Zambia	49.55	
30	4	Ibdalazim Mohamed	Sudan	49.90	
31	3	Bockarie Sesay	Sierra Leone	50.17	
	2	Gilles Anthony Afoumba	Republic of the Congo	DQ	R162.8
	2	Retselistisoe Gsoeu	Lesotho	DNS	
	3	Fikru Abu	Ethiopia	DNS	
	4	Gatkuoth Ruben Yutchol	South Sudan	DNS	

=== Semifinals ===
Qualification: First 2 in each semifinal (Q) and the next 2 fastest (q) advanced to the final.

Rank	Heat	Name	Nationality	Time	Notes
1	1	Isaac Makwala	Botswana	44.87	Q
2	2	Orukpe Erayokan	Nigeria	44.95	Q
3	2	Onkabetse Nkobolo	Botswana	45.10	Q, SB
4	1	Boniface Mweresa	Kenya	45.15	Q, SB
5	3	Alex Sampao	Kenya	45.31	Q, SB
6	3	Sadam Elnour	Sudan	45.41	Q
7	3	Saviour Kombe	Zambia	45.57	q, SB
8	2	Raymond Kibet	Kenya	45.66	q, SB
9	1	Ofentse Mogawane	South Africa	45.75	
10	1	Samson Oghenewegba Nathaniel	Nigeria	45.80	
11	3	Leaname Maotoanong	Botswana	45.99	
12	2	Emmanuel Dasor	Ghana	46.02	
13	3	Rodwell Ndhlovu	Zimbabwe	46.04	
14	1	Daniel Gyasi	Ghana	46.45	
15	2	George Effah	Ghana	46.65	SB
16	2	Kenenisa Hailu	Ethiopia	46.83	
17	3	Diakalia Bamba	Mali	46.96	
18	2	Mahamat Bachir Ahmat	Chad	47.13	SB
19	3	Mamadou Gueye	Senegal	47.26	
20	1	Denis Opio	Uganda	47.39	
21	1	Ernst Narib	Namibia	47.49	
	1	Marie Heddy	Seychelles	DNS	
	2	Mohamed Khouaja	Libya	DNS	
	3	Robert Simmonson	Nigeria	DNS	

=== Final ===
Rank	Lane	Name	Nationality	Time	Notes
1st place, gold medalist(s)	5	Isaac Makwala	Botswana	44.35	
2nd place, silver medalist(s)	8	Boniface Mweresa	Kenya	45.01	SB
3rd place, bronze medalist(s)	6	Onkabetse Nkobolo	Botswana	45.50	
4	4	Alex Sampao	Kenya	45.59	
5	9	Sadam Elnour	Sudan	45.69	
6	7	Orukpe Erayokan	Nigeria	45.73	
7	3	Raymond Kibet	Kenya	45.79	
8	2	Saviour Kombe	Zambia	46.65	
