= Athletics at the 2011 All-Africa Games – Men's 4 × 100 metres relay =

The men's 4 x 100 metres relay event at the 2011 All-Africa Games was held on 13 September.

== Results ==
| Rank | Nation | Athletes | Time | Notes |
|---|---|---|---|---|
| 1st place, gold medalist(s) | Nigeria | Peter Emelieze, Obinna Metu, Benjamin Adukwu, Ogho-Oghene Egwero | 38.93 | |
| 2nd place, silver medalist(s) | Ghana | Aziz Zakari, Emmanuel Kubi, Ashhad Agyapong, Tim Abeyie | 38.95 | |
| 3rd place, bronze medalist(s) | Botswana | Pako Seribe, Fanuel Kenosi, Thapelo Ketlogetswe, Obakeng Ngwigwa | 39.09 | |
| 4 | Ivory Coast | ?, ?, ?, ? | 39.50 | |
| 5 | Mauritius | Fabrice Coiffic, Eric Milazar, ?, ? | 39.85 | |
| 6 | Cameroon | ?, ?, ?, ? | 40.16 | |
| 7 | Zimbabwe | ?, ?, ?, ? | 40.20 | |
| 8 | Kenya | ?, ?, ?, ? | 40.33 | |
