= Kemar Bailey-Cole =

Jamaican sprinter (born 1992)

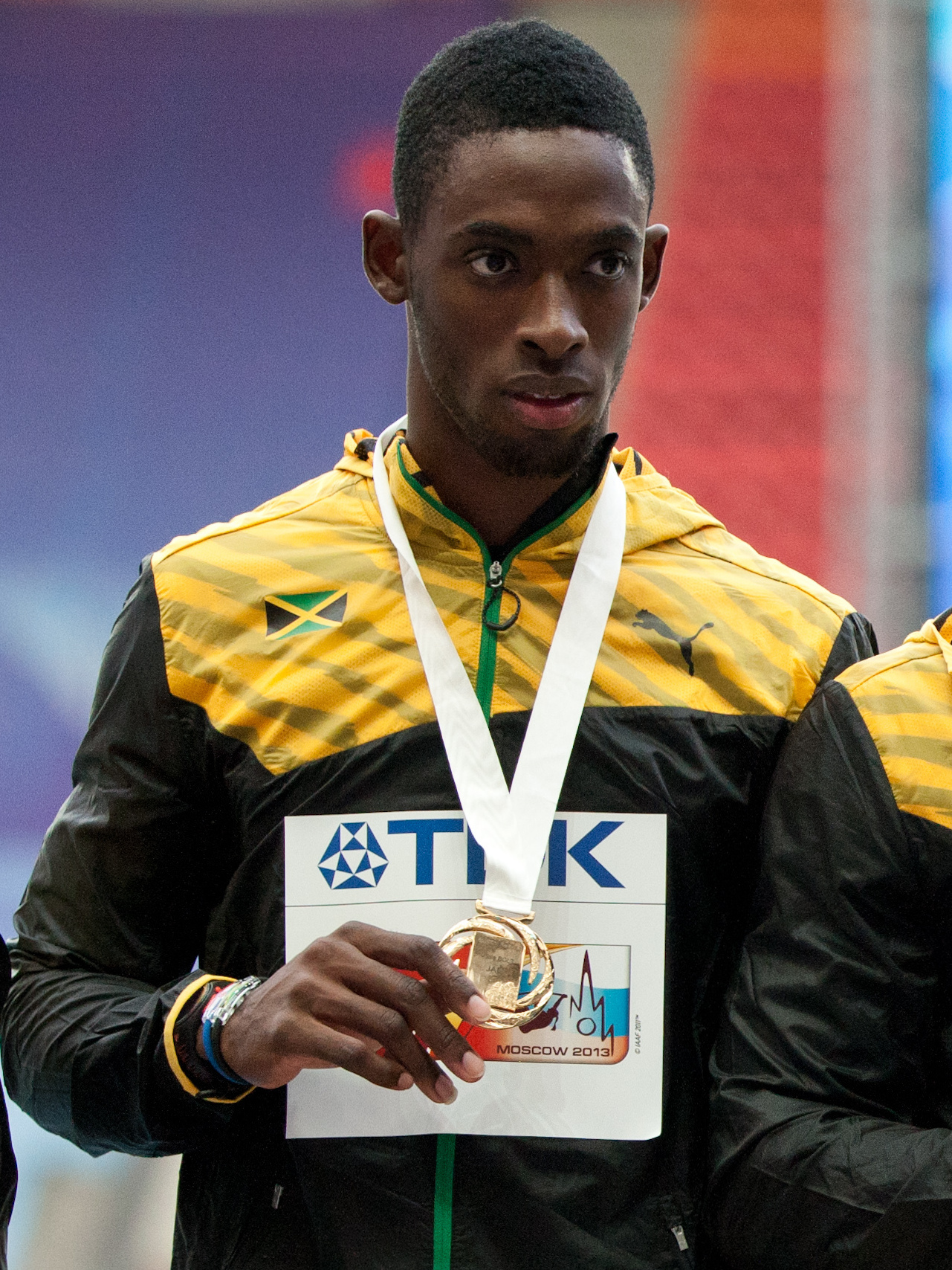

Personal information
- Born: 10 January 1992 (age 34) St. Catherine, Jamaica
- Height: 1.93 m (6 ft 4 in)
- Weight: 83 kg (183 lb)

Sport
- Sport: Track and field
- Event: Sprints
- Coached by: Glen Mills

Achievements and titles
- Personal bests: 100 m: 9.92 (London 2015); 200 m: 20.66 (Kingston 2015)
Medal record
Men's athletics
Representing Jamaica
Olympic Games
Gold medal – first place	2012 London	4 × 100 m relay
Gold medal – first place	2016 Rio de Janeiro	4 × 100 m relay
World Championships
Gold medal – first place	2013 Moscow	4 × 100 m relay
World Relay Championships
Silver medal – second place	2015 Nassau	4 × 100 m relay
Commonwealth Games
Gold medal – first place	2014 Glasgow	100 m
Gold medal – first place	2014 Glasgow	4 × 100 m relay
CARIFTA Games (U20)
Gold medal – first place	2009 Vieux Fort	4 × 100 m relay
Gold medal – first place	2010 George Town	4 × 100 m relay
Gold medal – first place	2011 Montego Bay	4 × 100 m relay
Silver medal – second place	2011 Montego Bay	100 m
Bronze medal – third place	2009 Vieux Fort	100 m

Kemar Bailey-Cole (born 10 January 1992) is a retired track and field athlete from Jamaica, who mainly competed in the 100 m. He is the 2014 Commonwealth Games champion in the 100 metres.

== Career ==
He qualified for the 2012 Summer Olympics running a personal best 10.00 sec at the Jamaican Olympic trials over 100 m coming 5th earning him a spot on the 4 × 100 relay for Jamaica at the 2012 Summer Olympics. He later improved his time to 9.97 in Brussels on 7 September 2012. He is coached by Glen Mills who also coaches Usain Bolt and Yohan Blake. In 2013 he once again improved his 100 m personal best to 9.96 seconds. In the 100 m final of the 2013 Jamaican National Championships, Bailey-Cole finished the race in 9.98 seconds, second only to Usain Bolt's 9.94, despite a 1.5 m/s headwind, where he earned a qualification to the 2013 World Championships in Athletics in Moscow. He set a personal best in the semi-final of the 2013 World Championships in Athletics of 9.93 seconds where he came second to teammate Nickel Ashmeade, however he could only manage 4th in the final, just outside the medal positions.

At the 2014 Commonwealth Games Bailey-Cole ran the 100 m final in 10.00 seconds to take the gold medal, beating England's Adam Gemili who took silver, and fellow countryman Nickel Ashmeade who took bronze. He was also part of the Jamaican team who won the 4 × 100 m relay in a Games record.

He was a part of the Jamaican relay team which won the gold medal at the 2016 Summer Olympics, running only in the heats.

== Personal bests ==
Event	Time	Venue	Date
100 m	9.92	London, United Kingdom	24 July 2015
200 m	20.83	Kingston, Jamaica	19 May 2012
