= Athmani =

Athmani is a surname. Notable people with the surname include:

- Skander Djamil Athmani (born 1992), Algerian athlete
