= Onyegbule =

- Gender: Male
- Language: Igbo

Origin
- Word/name: Nigeria
- Meaning: Never quit

Onyegbule is a surname of Igbo origin in south eastern Nigeria.

== Notable people with the surname include ==
- Chigozirim Onyegbule, Nigerian Anglican bishop
- Lovina Onyegbule, Nigerian athlete
