= Jason Livermore =

Jamaican sprinter (born 1988)

Personal information
- Born: 25 April 1988 (age 38) Kingston, Jamaica

Sport
- Sport: Track and field
Medal record
Representing Jamaica
Commonwealth Games
| Gold medal – first place | 2014 Glasgow | 4×100 m relay |
| Bronze medal – third place | 2014 Glasgow | 200 m |
CAC Championships
| Silver medal – second place | 2013 Morelia | 4×100 m relay |
| Bronze medal – third place | 2013 Morelia | 200 m |

Jason Livermore (born 25 April 1988) is a Jamaican track and field sprinter who competes in the 100 metres and 200 metres. He has personal bests of 10.05 seconds and 20.13 seconds for the distances, respectively. He was the bronze medallist in the 200 m at the 2014 Commonwealth Games.

He represented his country at the 2013 World Championships in Athletics and twice at the Pan American Games (2007 . Livermore has competed in the Jamaican relay team in the 4×100, 4×200 and 4×400 metres relay. He runs for Akan Track Club.

== Career ==
Born in Kingston, Jamaica, Livermore attended Calabar High School and ran for the school alongside other sprint alumni Warren Weir and Ramone McKenzie. He made his first international appearances at the age of nineteen. Having set a 100 m best of 10.64 seconds for fourth at the Jamaican High School Championships, he was chosen for the 2007 Pan American Games, but he did not get past the heats at the meet in Rio de Janeiro. He improved his 100 m best to 10.61 seconds in 2008, then 10.43 in 2010. A 200 m best of 21.61 seconds brought him eighth at the Jamaican Athletics Championships. He was part of the Jamaican 4×400 metres relay team for the 2010 NACAC Under-23 Championships in Athletics and the quartet including Roxroy Cato, Teo Bennett, and Ramone McKenzie placed fourth. Livermore ran 10.31 seconds at the 2011 Jamaican Championships, but could not progress beyond the quarter-finals due to the depth of Jamaican men's sprinting. He returned to the Pan American Games in 2011. He was eliminated in the first round of the 100 m, but ran a best of 20.73 seconds in 200 m qualifying, later being eliminated in the semi-finals. He ran in both sprint relay teams for Jamaica, but neither reached the final. He did not compete internationally in 2012 – his best race that year was a personal best-equalling time of 10.31 seconds in the 100 m.

Livermore was second to Kim Collins at the 2013 UTech Classic in Kingston, running 10.29 seconds. He made big improvements at the Jamaican Championships starting with a 100 m best of 10.07 seconds for fifth overall. He knocked over half a second off his 200 m best during the tournament and his time of 20.13 seconds in the final was enough for third behind Warren Weir and Nickel Ashmeade. This earned him the fourth 200 m spot on the Jamaican team at the 2013 World Championships in Athletics (defending champion Usain Bolt was automatically qualified). Prior to that event, he was a double medallist at the 2013 Central American and Caribbean Championships in Athletics: first he won the bronze in the 200 m, then he shared in the 4×100 metres relay silver medals after anchoring home a team of Oshane Bailey, Andrew Fisher, and Jermaine Brown. On his global senior debut in Moscow he reached the semi-finals of the World Championship 200 metres.

The inaugural 2014 IAAF World Relays saw Livermore on qualification duty in the 4×200 metres relay. He helped the team to a continental record of 1:20.15 minutes, which was soon broken by the world record-setting Jamaican team in the final. He started competing on the international track and field circuit and was second in the 200 m at the Rabat Meeting to Femi Ogunode. He peaked for the Jamaican Championships with a best of 10.05 seconds in the 100 m. He was the runner-up over 100 m and third in the 200 m. He was chosen to represent Jamaica at the 2014 Commonwealth Games and reached the final of both events. First, he placed sixth in the Commonwealth Games 100 m and then he took the bronze medal in a Jamaican medal sweep in the 200 m final, alongside Rasheed Dwyer and Weir. He then earned his first international gold medal, helping Jamaica to first place in the men's 4 × 100 m, setting a new games record of 37.58.

== Personal bests ==
- 100 metres – 10.03 sec (2016)
- 200 metres – 20.13 sec (2013)
