= Tega Odele =

Nigerian sprinter

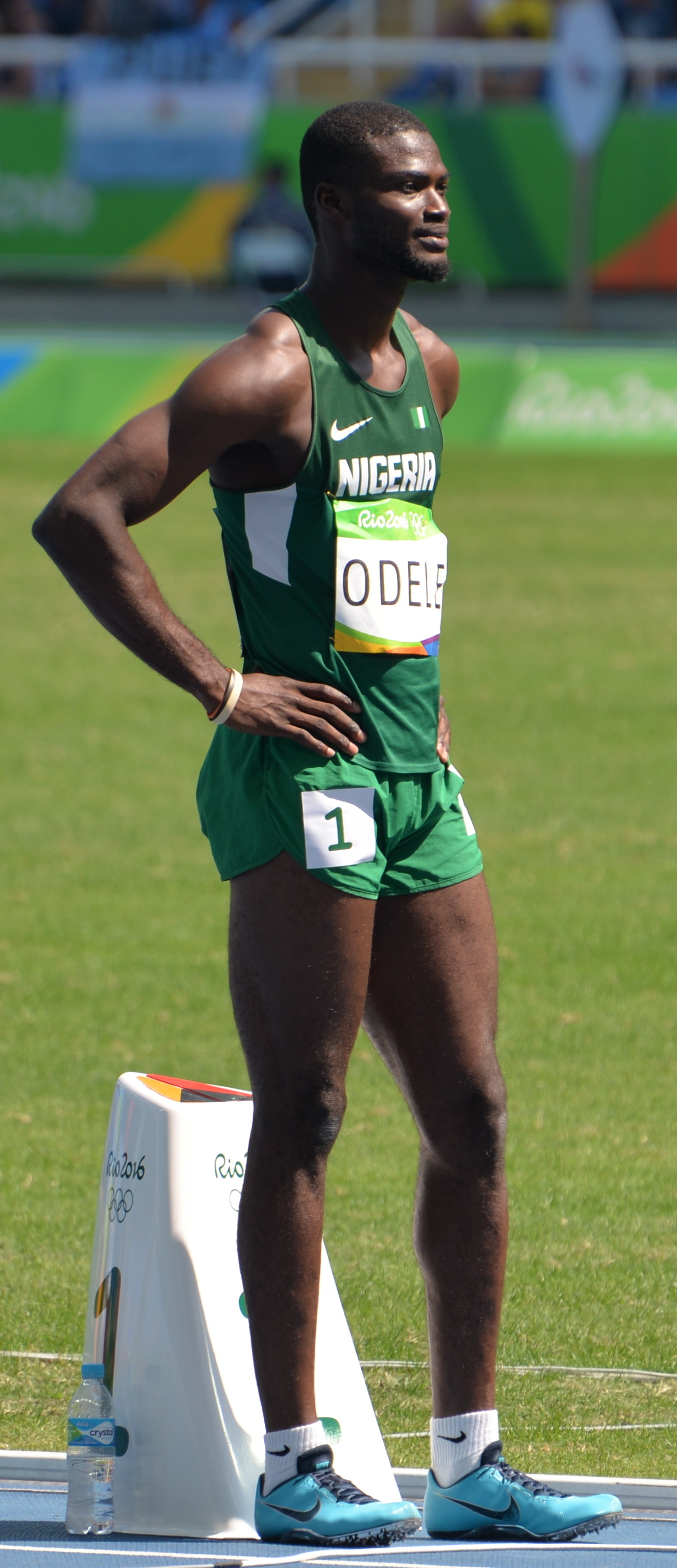
- Odele at the 2016 Olympics

Personal information
- Born: 6 December 1995 (age 30) Delta State, Nigeria
- Education: University of Benin
- Height: 1.88 m (6 ft 2 in)
- Weight: 80 kg (176 lb)

Sport
- Sport: Athletics
- Event: 200 metres

Achievements and titles
- Personal best: 200 m: 20.45 s (2015)
Medal record
Representing Nigeria
All-Africa Games
Bronze medal – third place	2015 Brazzaville	200 m
African Junior Championships
Gold medal – first place	2013 Bambous	4 x 100 m
- Updated on 15 August 2016

Tega Peter Odele (born 6 December 1995) is a Nigerian sprinter. He competed in the 200 metres at the 2015 World Championships in Beijing without qualifying for the semifinals. He was the 2015 African Games 200 m Bronze medallist.

He attended Noble Crest Nursery and Primary School, Ughelli and got his Senior School leaving Certificate at Federal Government College, Warri. Odele studied Business Administration at the University of Benin.

In 2012, he won the 200 m at the 18th Nigerian National Sports Festival. He was supposed to run at the 2014 World Junior Championships but did not start in his heat. He won the 200 m at the 2014 Nigerian Universities Games in Ile-Ife. He was also a member of the 4 x 100 and 4 x 400 winning teams. Odele won the 200 m at the 2015 Nigerian Championships in a personal best time of 20.47 s. He qualified for the 2015 World Championships with this run and was later selected to represent his country in Beijing. He placed 6th in his heat with a time of 20.49 s and did not progress to the semifinals.

He set a personal best of 20.45 s in his heat of the 200 m at the 2015 African Games. He later finished third in the final behind Divine Oduduru and Hua Wilfried Koffi.

== Competition record ==
Year	Competition	Venue	Position	Event	Notes
Representing Nigeria
2013	African Junior Championships	Bambous, Mauritius	4th	200 m	21.69
2013	African Junior Championships	Bambous, Mauritius	1st	4 × 100 m relay	40.36
2014	World Junior Championships	Eugene, United States	5th	4 × 100 m relay	39.66
2015	Universiade	Brazzaville, Republic of the Congo	11th (h)	4 × 100 m relay	40.45
2015	World Championships	Beijing, China	30th (h)	200 m	20.49
2015	African Games	Brazzaville, Republic of the Congo	3rd	200 m	20.58
2015	African Games	Brazzaville, Republic of the Congo	1st (h)	4 × 100 m relay	38.97^{1}
2016	Olympic Games	Rio de Janeiro, Brazil	70th (h)	200 m	21.25

^{1}Disqualified in the final
