= Athletics at the 2015 African Games =

Athletics at the XI African Games
- Dates: 13–17 September
- Host city: Brazzaville, Congo (Republic of the Congo)
- Venue: New Kintele Stadium
- Events: 74
- Participation: 564 athletes from 48 nations

The athletics competition at the 2015 African Games was held from 13 to 17 September 2015 at the New Kintele Stadium in Brazzaville, in the Republic of Congo.

The original winners of the long jump competitions, Chinaza Amadi and Samson Idiata of Nigeria, failed drugs tests at the competition and were disqualified.

== Medal summary ==
=== Men ===
Event	Gold		Silver		Bronze	
100 metres	Ben Youssef Meïté (CIV)	10.04 NR	Ogho-Oghene Egwero (NGR)	10.17	Hua Wilfried Koffi (CIV)	10.23
200 metres	Hua Wilfried Koffi (CIV)	20.42	Divine Oduduru (NGR)	20.45	Tega Odele (NGR)	20.58
400 metres	Isaac Makwala (BOT)	44.35	Boniface Mweresa (KEN)	45.01	Onkabetse Nkobolo (BOT)	45.50
800 metres	Nijel Amos (BOT)	1:50.45	Taoufik Makhloufi (ALG)	1:50.72	Job Kinyor (KEN)	1:50.79
1500 metres	Mekonnen Gebremedhin (ETH)	3:45.73	Abdi Waiss Mouhyadin (DJI)	3:45.98	Salim Keddar (ALG)	3:46.31
5000 metres	Getaneh Molla (ETH)	13:21.88	Leul Gebresilase (ETH)	13:22.13	Thomas Longosiwa (KEN)	13:22.72
10,000 metres	Tsebelu Zewude (ETH)	27:27.19	Leonard Barsoton (KEN)	27:27.55	Adugna Takele (ETH)	27:28.40
110 metres hurdles	Antonio Alkana (RSA)	13.32 GR	Lyès Mokdel (ALG)	13.49	Tyron Akins (NGA)	13.54
400 metres hurdles	Abdelmalik Lahoulou (ALG)	48.67	Miloud Rahmani (ALG)	49.27	Mohamed Sghaier (TUN)	49.32
3000 metres steeplechase	Clement Kemboi Kimutai (KEN)	8:20.31	Hillary Kemboi Cheserek (KEN)	8:22.96 SB	Hailemariyam Amare (ETH)	8:24.19 SB
4 × 100 metres relay	Ivory Coast; Christopher Naliali; Hua Wilfried Koffi; Arthur Cissé; Ben Youssef Meïté	38.93	Namibia; Even Tjiviju; Hitjivirue Kaanjuka; Dantago Gurirab; Jesse Urikhob	39.22	Ghana; Daniel Gyasi; Solomon Afful; Emmanuel Dasor; Shepard Agbeko	39.71
4 × 400 metres relay	Kenya; Raymond Kibet; Alex Sampao; Kiprono Koskei; Boniface Mweresa	3:00.34 GR	Botswana; Onkabetse Nkobolo; Nijel Amos; Leaname Maotoanong; Isaac Makwala	3:00.95	Algeria; Miloud Laradt; Miloud Rahmani; Sofiane Bouhedda; Abdelmalik Lahoulou	3:03.07
20 kilometres walk	Lebogang Shange (RSA)	1:26.43	Samuel Ireri Gathimba (KEN)	1:26.44	Wayne Snyman (RSA)	1:27.32
Half marathon	Zersenay Tadese (ERI)	1:03.11	Luka Kanda (KEN)	1:03.27	Hizkel Tewelde (ERI)	1:03.39
High jump	Kabelo Kgosiemang (BOT)	2.25	Ali Mohd Younes Idriss (SUD)	2.22	Chris Moleya (RSA)	2.22
Pole vault	Hichem Khalil Cherabi (ALG)	5.25	Jordan Yamoah (GHA)	5.20	Mohamed Romhdana (TUN)	5.10
Long jump	Ndiss Kaba Badji (SEN)	7.74	Mamadou Gueye (SEN)	7.69	Romeo N'tia (BEN)	7.44
Triple jump	Tosin Oke (NGA)	17.00	Olumide Olamigoke (NGA)	16.98	Mamadou Chérif Dia (MLI)	16.54
Shot put	Franck Elemba (CGO)	20.25 GR, NR	Mohamed Magdi Hamza (EGY)	19.78	Jaco Engelbrecht (RSA)	19.55
Discus throw	Russell Tucker (RSA)	60.41	Essohounamondom Tchalim (TOG)	52.72 NR	Franck Elemba (CGO)	50.30
Hammer throw	Mostafa Al-Gamel (EGY)	74.92	Chris Harmse (RSA)	73.49	Nicholas Li Yun Fong (MRI)	59.36
Javelin throw	Ihab El-Sayed (EGY)	85.37 GR	John Ampomah (GHA)	82.94	Phil-Mar van Rensburg (RSA)	76.85
Decathlon	Guillaume Thierry (MRI)	7591 NR	Atsu Nyamadi (GHA)	7478	Fredriech Pretorius (RSA)	7186

=== Women ===
Event	Gold		Silver		Bronze	
100 metres	Marie-Josée Ta Lou (CIV)	11.02 GR	Eunice Kadogo (KEN)	11.47 NR	Pon Karidjatou Traore (BFA); Adeline Gouenon (CIV)	11.49
200 metres	Marie-Josée Ta Lou (CIV)	22.57	Ngozi Onwumere (NGR)	23.24	Lawretta Ozoh (NGR)	23.37
400 metres	Kabange Mupopo (ZAM)	50.22 NR	Patience Okon George (NGR)	50.71	Tjipekapora Herunga (NAM)	51.55
800 metres	Caster Semenya (RSA)	2:00.97	Annet Mwanzi (KEN)	2:01.54	Chaltu Shume (ETH)	2:01.59
1500 metres	Dawit Seyaum (ETH)	4:16.69	Beso Sado (ETH)	4:18.86	Beatrice Chepkoech (KEN)	4:19.16
5000 metres	Margaret Chelimo Kipkemboi (KEN)	15:30.15	Rosemary Monica Wanjiru (KEN)	15:30.18	Alice Aprot Nawowuna (KEN)	15:31.82 SB
10,000 metres	Alice Aprot Nawowuna (KEN)	31:24.18	Gladys Kiptagelai (KEN)	31:36.87	Gelete Burka (ETH)	31:38.33
100 metres hurdles	Oluwatobiloba Amusan (NGR)	13.15	Gnima Faye (SEN)	13.28	Lindsay Lindley (NGR)	13.30
400 metres hurdles	Amaka Ogoegbunam (NGR)	55.86	Ajoke Odumosu (NGR)	57.63	Lilianne Klaasman (NAM)	58.68 NR
3000 metres steeplechase	Sofia Assefa (ETH)	9:51.30	Hiwot Ayalew (ETH)	9:51.94	Purity Cherotich (KEN)	9:52.54
4 × 100 metres relay	Nigeria; Cecilia Francis; Blessing Okagbare; Ngozi Onwumere; Lawretta Ozoh	43.10	Ghana; Flings Owusu-Agyapong; Gemma Acheampong; Beatrice Gyaman; Janet Amponsah	43.72	Ivory Coast; Roswita Okou; Adeline Gouenon; Adjona Triphene Kouame; Marie-Josée Ta Lou	43.98
4 × 400 metres relay	Nigeria; Rita Ossai; Funke Oladoye; Tosin Adeloye; Patience Okon George	3:27.12	Botswana; Lydia Mashila; Goitseone Seleka; Galefele Moroko; Christine Botlogetswe	3:32.84	Kenya; Hellen Syombua; Annet Mwanzi; Winnie Chebet; Maureen Nyatichi	3:35.91
20 kilometres walk	Grace Wanjiru Njue (KEN)	1:38.28 GR	Aynalem Eshetu Shefrawe (ETH)	1:36.49	Askale Tiksa (ETH)	1:42.25
Half marathon	Mamitu Deska (ETH)	1:12.42	Worknesh Degefa (ETH)	1:12.42	Yebergal Melese (ETH)	1:12.42
High jump	Lissa Labiche (SEY)	1.91	Doreen Amata (NGA)	1.85	Julia du Plessis (RSA)	1.80
Pole vault	Syrine Ebondo (TUN)	4.10 GR	Dorra Mahfoudhi (TUN)	4.10 =GR	Sinaly Ouattara (CIV)	3.40
Long jump	Joëlle Mbumi Nkouindjin (CMR)	6.31	Roumeissa Belabiod (ALG)	6.30	Lissa Labiche (SEY)	6.25
Triple jump	Joëlle Mbumi Nkouindjin (CMR)	13.75	Ibrahim Blessing Ibukun (NGA)	13.52	Nadia Eke (GHA)	13.40 NR
Shot put	Auriole Dongmo (CMR)	17.13	Claire Uke (NGR)	16.64	Sonia Smuts (RSA)	15.92
Discus throw	Claire Uke (NGR)	54.25	Ischke Senekal (RSA)	50.53	Julia Agawu (GHA)	49.08
Hammer throw	Lætitia Bambara (BFA)	66.91 GR	Amy Sène (SEN)	63.94	Jennifer Batu (CGO)	62.13 NR
Javelin throw	Kelechi Nwanaga (NGR)	52.70	Zuta Mary Nartey (GHA)	50.93	Jo-Ane van Dyk (RSA)	50.52
Heptathlon	Uhunoma Osazuwa (NGR)	5892	Odile Ahouanwanou (BEN)	5734	Marthe Koala (BUR)	5664

== Para-sport ==
=== Men ===
Event	Gold		Silver		Bronze	
100m T11	Ananias Shikongo (NAM)	11.45	Olusegun Francis Rotawo (NGA)	11.63	Charles Christol Atangana Ntsama (CMR)	11.84
100m T37	Fanie van der Merwe (RSA)	11.60	Sofiane Hamdi (ALG)	12.36	Oumar Sidibe (MLI)	12.81
100m T54	Fathi Zouinkhi (TUN)	14.88	Raphael Botsyo Nkegbe (GHA)	15.24	Maamar Harachif (ALG)	15.40
200m T11	Ananias Shikongo (NAM)	23.00	Olusegun Francis Rotawo (NGA)	23.68	Jose Chamoleia (ANG)	23.95
200m T12	Jonathan Ntutu (RSA)	22.47	Hilton Langenhoven (RSA)	22.69	Djamil Nasser (ALG)	22.99
400m T11	Ananias Shikongo (NAM)	51.63	Jose Chamoleia (ANG)	52.74	Samwel Kimani (KEN)	53.19
400m T12	Henry Nzungi (KEN)	49.84	Achraf Lahouel (TUN)	50.17	Bati Megeresa (ETH)	51.11
400m T13	Johannes Nambala (NAM)	48.49	Abdelatif Baka (ALG)	48.68	Demisse Tramiru (ETH)	49.61
400m T46	Cliff Muvunyi Hermas (RWA)	49.16	Elias Ndimulunde (NAM)	49.52	Jean-Luc Noumbo Kouame (CIV)	50.19
800m T54	Yassine Gharbi (TUN)	1:50.74	Patrick Yaw Obeng (GHA)	1:52.56	Fathi Zouinkhi (TUN)	1:52.81
1500m T46	Samir Nouiaua (ALG)	3:57.54	David Emong (UGA)	3:59.41	Steper Wanboua (KEN)	4:00.74
1500m T53/54	Yassine Gharbi (TUN)	3:36.91	Yaw Obeng Patrick (GHA)	3:37.95	Fathi Zouinkhi (TUN)	3:38.32
Javelin Throw F42/44	Márcio Fernandes (CPV)	50.91	Kheireddine Ougour (ALG)	39.95	Gbolahan Olaiya (NGR)	41.91
Javelin Throw F56/57	Youssoupha Diouf (SEN)	40.24	Ramadan Elattar Mahmoud (EGY)	39.42	Raed salem (EGY)	38.54
Discus Throw 43/44	Abdurraouf Said (LBA)	41.70	Márcio Fernandes (CPV)	40.07	Gbolahan Olaiya (NGA)	39.63
Discus Throw F54/56	Ibrahim Ibrahim (EGY)	37.95	Edosomwan Osahon (NGR)	29.73	Anthony Imbimoh (NGR)	28.69
Shot Put F42	Tyrone Pillay (RSA)	11.28	Waleed Ali Mousa Ashteebah (LBA)	10.50	Heugene Murray (RSA)	9.94
Shot Put F54/55	Rene Gobe Christian (CMR)	9.75	Mourad Bachir (ALG)	9.42	Osahon Edosomwan (NGR)	8.52
Shot Put F56/57	Amarakuo Solomon (NGR)	10.61	Emeka Kiyem (NGR)	11.70	Mohamed Ouchene (ALG)	11.33

=== Women ===
Event	Gold		Silver		Bronze	
100m T11	Lovina Onyegbule (NGA)	12.64	Fatimata Brigitte Diasso (CIV)	12.94	Esperanca Gilcaso (ANG)	13.12
100m T13	Christine Akullo (UGA)	13.34	Johanna Pretorius (RSA)	13.58	Laina Sithole (ZIM)	13.63
100m T37	Johanna Benson (NAM)	14.39	Neda Bahi (TUN)	14.64	none	
200m T11	Lovina Onyegbule (NGR)	25.27	Fatimata Brigitte Diasso (CIV)	26.08	Lahja Ishitile (NAM)	26.26
200m T12	Edmilsa Governo (MOZ)	25.62	Maria Muchavo (MOZ)	25.87	Najah Chouaya (TUN)	27.02
400m T13	Souhila Lounis (ALG)	59.62	Denise Dividas (MOZ)	1:01.20	Johanna Pretorius (RSA)	1:02.16
Javelin Throw F54/56	Hania Aidi (TUN)	16.94	Flora Ugwunwa (NGR)	13.93	Mariam Coulibaly (MLI)	12.97
Discus Throw F54/57	Flora Ugwunwa (NGR)	18.54	Nassima Saifi (ALG)	33.01	Njideka Iyiazi (NGR)	26.67
Shot Put F54-57	Nassima Saifi (ALG)	10.66	Safia Djalal (ALG)	10.65	Njideka Iyiazi (NGR)	10.46

== Medal tables ==
=== Elite competition ===
* Host nation (Congo)

As of 16 September 2015
Rank	Nation	Gold	Silver	Bronze	Total
1	Nigeria (NGR)	8	9	4	21
2	Ethiopia (ETH)	6	5	6	17
3	Kenya (KEN)	5	9	6	20
4	Ivory Coast (CIV)	5	0	4	9
5	South Africa (RSA)	4	2	8	14
6	Botswana (BOT)	3	2	1	6
7	Cameroon (CMR)	3	0	0	3
8	Algeria (ALG)	2	4	2	8
9	Egypt (EGY)	2	1	0	3
10	Senegal (SEN)	1	3	0	4
11	Tunisia (TUN)	1	1	2	4
12	Burkina Faso (BUR)	1	0	2	3
12	Congo (CGO)*	1	0	2	3
14	Eritrea (ERI)	1	0	1	2
14	Mauritius (MRI)	1	0	1	2
14	Seychelles (SEY)	1	0	1	2
17	Zambia (ZAM)	1	0	0	1
18	Ghana (GHA)	0	5	3	8
19	Namibia (NAM)	0	1	2	3
20	Benin (BEN)	0	1	1	2
21	Djibouti (DJI)	0	1	0	1
21	Sudan (SUD)	0	1	0	1
21	Togo (TOG)	0	1	0	1
24	Mali (MLI)	0	0	1	1
Totals (24 entries)		46	46	47	139

=== Para-sport competition ===
Rank	Nation	Gold	Silver	Bronze	Total
1	Namibia (NAM)	5	1	1	7
2	Nigeria (NGR)	4	5	6	15
3	Tunisia (TUN)	4	2	3	9
4	Algeria (ALG)	3	6	3	12
5	South Africa (RSA)	3	2	2	7
6	Mozambique (MOZ)	1	2	0	3
7	Egypt (EGY)	1	1	1	3
8	Cape Verde (CPV)	1	1	0	2
8	Libya (LBY)	1	1	0	2
8	Uganda (UGA)	1	1	0	2
11	Kenya (KEN)	1	0	2	3
12	Cameroon (CMR)	1	0	1	2
13	Rwanda (RWA)	1	0	0	1
13	Senegal (SEN)	1	0	0	1
15	Ghana (GHA)	0	3	0	3
16	Ivory Coast (CIV)	0	2	1	3
17	Angola (ANG)	0	1	2	3
18	Ethiopia (ETH)	0	0	2	2
18	Mali (MLI)	0	0	2	2
20	Zimbabwe (ZIM)	0	0	1	1
Totals (20 entries)		28	28	27	83

== Participating nations ==
According to an unofficial count, there were 564 athletes from 48 nations participating in the elite competition.

- Algeria (18)
- Angola (1)
- Benin (3)
- Botswana (17)
- Burkina Faso (10)
- Burundi (2)
- Cameroon (14)
- Cape Verde (1)
- Central African Republic (3)
- Chad (5)
- Democratic Republic of the Congo (9)
- Djibouti (5)
- Egypt (8)
- Equatorial Guinea (2)
- Eritrea (20)
- Ethiopia (64)
- Gambia (5)
- Ghana (20)
- Guinea (3)
- Ivory Coast (11)
- Kenya (61)
- Lesotho (11)
- Libya (1)
- Madagascar (2)
- Mali (7)
- Mauritania (2)
- Mauritius (14)
- Mozambique (4)
- Namibia (14)
- Niger (2)
- Nigeria (44)
- Republic of the Congo (41)
- Rwanda (4)
- São Tomé and Príncipe (2)
- Senegal (14)
- Seychelles (5)
- Sierra Leone (11)
- Somalia (3)
- South Africa (35)
- South Sudan (7)
- Sudan (13)
- Swaziland (3)
- Tanzania (4)
- Togo (4)
- Tunisia (8)
- Uganda (9)
- Zambia (11)
- Zimbabwe (7)
