= Daniel Gyasi =

Ghanaian sprinter (born 1994)

Personal information
- Nationality: Ghana
- Born: 25 September 1994 (age 31) Kumasi, Ghana

Sport
- Sport: Athletics
Medal record
Men's athletics
Representing Ghana
African Games
Bronze medal – third place	2015 Brazzaville	4x100 m relay
African Championships
Silver medal – second place	2014 Marrakesh	4×100 m
- Updated on 26 August 2016

Daniel Gyasi (born 25 September 1994) is a Ghanaian sprinter specialising in the 400 metres. He won relay medals at the 2014 African Championships and 2015 African Games.

His personal bests in the event are 46.45 seconds outdoors (Warri 2015) and 47.31 seconds indoors (Albuquerque 2015).

== Competition record ==
Year	Competition	Venue	Position	Event	Notes
Representing Ghana
2012	African Championships	Porto-Novo, Benin	16th (sf)	400 m	47.86
2012	African Championships	Porto-Novo, Benin	4th	4 × 400 m relay	3:10.43
2012	World Junior Championships	Barcelona, Spain	21st (sf)	400 m	47.78
2012	World Junior Championships	Barcelona, Spain	12th (h)	4 × 400 m relay	3:11.46
2014	Commonwealth Games	Glasgow, United Kingdom	25th (h)	400 m	47.07
2014	Commonwealth Games	Glasgow, United Kingdom	–	4 × 400 m relay	DQ
2014	African Championships	Marrakesh, Morocco	8th	400 m	46.94
2014	African Championships	Marrakesh, Morocco	2nd	4 × 100 m relay	39.28
2015	African Games	Brazzaville, Republic of the Congo	14th (sf)	400 m	46.45
2015	African Games	Brazzaville, Republic of the Congo	3rd	4 × 100 m relay	39.78
2015	African Games	Brazzaville, Republic of the Congo	5th	4 × 400 m relay	3:05.15
