= Adel Sesay =

Sierra Leonean sprinter

Personal information
- Born: 11 December 1990 (age 34) Freetown, Sierra Leone

Sport
- Sport: Athletics
- Event(s): 60 m, 100 m

Adel Sesay (born 11 December 1990) is a Sierra Leonean sprinter. He competed in the 60 metres at the 2016 IAAF World Indoor Championships. He also represented Sierra Leone at the 2018 IAAF World Indoor Championships in the United Kingdom and the 2014 Commonwealth Games in Glasgow, Scotland. He also competed in the Flander international athletics competition in Belgium.

Sesay is from Rugby, Warwickshire where he represented the Rugby & Northampton Athletics Club. He was the only athlete to have been chosen in 2016 by Sierra Leone.

== Competition record ==
Year	Competition	Venue	Position	Event	Notes
Representing Sierra Leone
2014	Commonwealth Games	Glasgow, United Kingdom	57th (h)	100 m	11.02
2014	Commonwealth Games	Glasgow, United Kingdom	13th (h)	4 × 100 m relay	40.55
2016	World Indoor Championships	Portland, United States	46th (h)	60 m	6.87
2018	World Indoor Championships	Birmingham, United Kingdom	41st (h)	60 m	7.08

== Personal bests ==
Outdoor

- 100 metres – 10.72 (+1.3 m/s, Tilburg 2014)
- 200 metres – 22.47(+1.3 m/s, Brussels 2014)

Indoor

- 60 metres – 6.87 (Ghent 2014)
