= Emmanuel Dasor =

Ghanaian sprinter (born 1995)

Personal information
- Born: 14 September 1995 (age 30) Accra, Ghana
- Education: Western Kentucky University

Sport
- Sport: Athletics
- Events: 200 m, 400 m
- College team: Western Kentucky Hilltoppers
Medal record
Men's athletics
Representing Ghana
African Games
Bronze medal – third place	2015 Brazzaville	4x100 m
African Championships
Silver medal – second place	2014 Marrakesh	4×100 m

Emmanuel Dasor (born 14 September 1995) is a Ghanaian sprinter specializing in the 200 meters and 400 meters races. He represented his country at the 2016 World Indoor Championships without advancing from the first round.

== Competition record ==
Year	Competition	Venue	Position	Event	Notes
Representing Ghana
2014	World Junior Championships	Eugene, United States	9th (sf)	200 m	20.75
2014	Commonwealth Games	Glasgow, United Kingdom	27th (h)	400 m	21.06
2014	Commonwealth Games	Glasgow, United Kingdom	–	4 × 400 m relay	DQ
2014	African Championships	Marrakesh, Morocco	15th (sf)	100 m	10.52
2014	African Championships	Marrakesh, Morocco	2nd	4 × 100 m relay	39.28
2015	African Games	Brazzaville, Republic of the Congo	12th (sf)	400 m	46.02
2015	African Games	Brazzaville, Republic of the Congo	3rd	4 × 100 m relay	39.78
2015	African Games	Brazzaville, Republic of the Congo	5th	4 × 400 m relay	3:05.15
2016	World Indoor Championships	Portland, United States	22nd (h)	400 m	47.86
2016	African Championships	Durban, South Africa	8th (sf)	200 m	20.92
2016	African Championships	Durban, South Africa	13th (sf)	400 m	47.12
2016	Olympic Games	Rio de Janeiro, Brazil	49th (h)	200 m	20.65

== Personal bests ==
Outdoor

- 100 metres – 10.41 (+1.6 m/s, Jonesboro 2014)
- 200 metres – 20.61 (+1.4 m/s, El Paso 2015)
- 400 metres – 45.61 (El Paso 2015)

Indoor

- 60 metres – 6.68 (Nashville 2016)
- 200 metres – 20.89 (Birmingham 2016)
- 400 metres – 46.21 (Birmingham 2016)
