= 2018 African Championships in Athletics – Men's 4 × 100 metres relay =

The men's 4 × 100 metres relay event at the 2018 African Championships in Athletics was held on 2 and 3 August in Asaba, Nigeria.

== Medalists ==
Gold	Silver	Bronze
South Africa; Henricho Bruintjies; Simon Magakwe; Emile Erasmus; Akani Simbine; Ncincihli Titi*	Nigeria; Ogho-Oghene Egwero; Ejowvokoghene Oduduru; Emmanuel Arowolo; Seye Ogunlewe; Enoch Olaoluwa Adegoke*	Ivory Coast; Néhémiah N'Goran Gnamien; Hua Wilfried Koffi; Arthur Cissé; Ben Youssef Méité

*Athletes who competed in heats only

== Results ==
=== Heats ===
Qualification: First 3 teams of each heat (Q) plus the next 2 fastest (q) qualified for the final.

Rank	Heat	Nation	Athletes	Time	Notes
1	2	South Africa	?, Simon Magakwe, Ncincihli Titi, Emile Erasmus	39.07	Q
2	2	Nigeria	Enoch Olaoluwa Adegoke, ?, ?, ?	39.18	Q
3	2	Ivory Coast	Ben Youssef Méité, Wilfried Koffi Hua, Néhémiah N'Goran Gnamien, Arthur Cissé	39.55	Q
4	1	Gambia	Alieu Joof, Assan Faye, Ebrahima Camara, Adama Jammeh	40.04	Q
5	1	Kenya	?, ?, ?, Mark Odhiambo	40.24	Q
6	2	Zimbabwe	Dickson Kapandura, Rodwel Ndlovu, Leon Tafirenyika, Tetenda Tsumba	40.37	q
7	1	Cameroon	?, ?, ?, Emmanuel Eseme	40.44	Q
8	1	Burkina Faso	Sidiki Ouedraogo, Idrissa Compaore, Hugues Zango, Innocent Bologo	40.74	q
9	1	Seychelles	?, ?, ?, ?	41.74	
10	2	Ethiopia	Nathan Abebe, ?, ?, ?	43.29	
	1	Senegal	?, ?, ?, ?	DNF	
	2	Ghana		DNS	

=== Final ===
Rank	Lane	Nation	Competitors	Time	Notes
1st place, gold medalist(s)	4	South Africa	Henricho Bruintjies, Simon Magakwe, Emile Erasmus, Akani Simbine	38.25	CR
2nd place, silver medalist(s)	5	Nigeria	Ogho-Oghene Egwero, Ejowvokoghene Oduduru, Emmanuel Arowolo, Seye Ogunlewe	38.74	
3rd place, bronze medalist(s)	7	Ivory Coast	Néhémiah N'Goran Gnamien, Wilfried Koffi Hua, Arthur Cissé, Ben Youssef Méité	38.92	
4	1	Zimbabwe	Leon Tafirenyika, ?, Dickson Kapandura, Ngoni Makusha	39.37	
5	3	Kenya	Peter Mwai, ?, Mike Mokamba Nyang'au, Mark Odhiambo	39.77	
6	6	Gambia	?, ?, Assan Faye, Adama Jammeh	39.88	
7	8	Cameroon	Tarcicuis Jean, Maxime Petnga, Emmanuel Eseme, Nsangou Tetndap	39.93	
8	2	Burkina Faso	Sidiki Ouedraogo, ?, ?, Innocent Bologo	40.96	
