= Ncincilili Titi =

South African sprinter

Medal record

Men's athletics

Representing South Africa

African Championships
Gold medal – first place	2018 Asaba	200 m
Gold medal – first place	2018 Asaba	4×100 m

Ncincilili Titi (born 15 December 1993) is a South African sprinter who competes primarily in the 200 metres events. He finished fourth at the 2014 African Championships, as well as at the 2015 Summer Universiade. He won the gold medal at the 2018 African Championships.

His personal bests in the event are 20.41 seconds outdoors (Pretoria 2014) and 20.87 seconds indoors (Fayetteville 2015).

He studies Public Health at the University of South Carolina. Ncincilili matriculated from Selborne College in East London.

== Competition record ==
Year	Competition	Venue	Position	Event	Notes
Representing South Africa
2014	African Championships	Marrakesh, Morocco	4th	200 m	20.63
2014	Commonwealth Games	Glasgow, United Kingdom	28th (h)	100 m	10.48
2014	Commonwealth Games	Glasgow, United Kingdom	6th (h)	200 m	20.66
2014	Commonwealth Games	Glasgow, United Kingdom	4th	4 × 100 m relay	38.35
2015	Universiade	Gwangju, South Korea	4th	200 m	20.68
2015	Universiade	Gwangju, South Korea	3rd	4 × 100 m relay	39.68
2017	Universiade	Taipei, Taiwan	4th	200 m	21.00
2018	African Championships	Asaba, Nigeria	1st	200 m	20.46
2018	African Championships	Asaba, Nigeria	1st*	4 × 100 m relay	39.07*

*Competed in heats only

== Personal bests ==
Outdoor

- 100 metres – 10.17 (+ 1.1 m/s) (Knoxville, 2018)
- 200 metres – 20.00 (+1.9 m/s) (Columbia, SC, 2018)

Indoor

- 200 metres – 20.87 (Fayetteville 2015)
