= Solomon Afful =

Ghanaian sprinter (born 1994)

Personal information
- Born: 28 July 1994 (age 31) Accra, Ghana
- Height: 6 ft 3 in (191 cm)
Medal record
Men's athletics
Representing Ghana
African Games
Bronze medal – third place	2015 Brazzaville	4x100 m
African Championships
Silver medal – second place	2014 Marrakesh	4x100 m

Solomon Afful (born 28 July 1994) is a Ghanaian sprinter who specializes in the 100 and 200 metres.

At the 2012 World Junior Championships he reached the semi-final of the 200 metres and competed in the 4 × 400 metres relay. At the 2014 Commonwealth Games he did not reach past the initial heat in the 100, 200 or relay.

At the 2014 African Championships he reached the semi-final in both 100 and 200 metres, and won a silver medal in the 4 × 100 metres relay. He then won another medal in the 4 × 100 metres relay at the 2015 African Games, a bronze medal.

His personal best times are 10.39 seconds in the 100 metres, achieved in May 2015 in Hutchinson; and 20.68 seconds in the 200 metres, achieved in May 2015 in El Dorado (counted by the IAAF despite having no wind information).
