= Athletics at the 2017 Summer Universiade – Men's 200 metres =

The men's 200 metres event at the 2017 Summer Universiade was held on 25 and 26 August at the Taipei Municipal Stadium in Taipei, Taiwan.

== Medalists ==
Gold	Silver	Bronze
Jeffrey John; France	James Linde; Canada	Ján Volko; Slovakia

== Results ==
=== Heats ===
Qualification: First 2 in each heat (Q) and next 6 fastest (q) qualified for the semifinals.

Wind:
Heat 1: +0.9 m/s, Heat 2: +0.3 m/s, Heat 3: -1.6 m/s, Heat 4: -1.9 m/s, Heat 5: -2.4 m/s
Heat 6: +1.5 m/s, Heat 7: +2.3 m/s, Heat 8: +2.0 m/s, Heat 9: -1.9 m/s

Rank	Heat	Name	Nationality	Time	Notes
1	8	Jacarias Martin	United States	20.87	Q
2	2	Aldemir da Silva Júnior	Brazil	20.92	Q
3	3	Jeffrey John	France	20.97	Q
3	8	Vladislav Grigoryev	Kazakhstan	20.97	Q
5	7	Jun Yamashita	Japan	21.02	Q
6	3	Dan-Neil Telesford	Trinidad and Tobago	21.04	Q
7	4	Ján Volko	Slovakia	21.05	Q
8	4	James Linde	Canada	21.07	Q
9	6	Yang Chun-han	Chinese Taipei	21.09	Q
10	6	Zhang Ruixuan	China	21.10	Q
11	2	Samuli Samuelsson	Finland	21.17	Q
12	6	Joachim Maartens	South Africa	21.20	q
13	3	Silvan Wicki	Switzerland	21.21	q
13	7	Skander Djamil Athmani	Algeria	21.21	Q
15	1	Ncincilili Titi	South Africa	21.34	Q
16	8	Bastien Mouthon	Switzerland	21.44	q
17	5	Sho Kitagawa	Japan	21.45	Q
18	1	Artur Zaczek	Poland	21.48	Q
19	1	Ionuţ Andrei Neagoe	Romania	21.57	q
20	4	Pius Adome	Uganda	21.60	q
21	5	Joseph Millar	New Zealand	21.62	Q
21	3	Šimon Bujna	Slovakia	21.62	q, PB
23	7	Ugnius Savickas	Lithuania	21.66	
23	8	Chan Yan Lam	Hong Kong	21.66	
25	6	Piotr Mitka	Poland	21.68	
26	4	Kostas Skrabulis	Lithuania	21.69	
27	2	Iván Moreno	Mexico	21.70	
28	4	Even Pettersen	Norway	21.78	PB
29	3	Markus Fuchs	Austria	21.79	
30	1	Christopher Naliali	Ivory Coast	21.82	
31	2	İzzet Safer	Turkey	21.84	
31	5	Aliffer Júnior dos Santos	Brazil	21.84	
33	6	Arturo Sepúlveda	Mexico	21.93	
34	1	Jakob Goroško	Estonia	21.95	
34	6	Benson Okot	Uganda	21.95	
36	3	Yeh Shou-po	Chinese Taipei	21.96	
37	4	Matías Robledo	Argentina	21.98	
37	8	Ko Seung-hwan	South Korea	21.98	
39	4	Andito Charles	Dominican Republic	22.04	
40	4	Stephen Opoku	Ghana	22.07	
41	3	Kendris Díaz	Dominican Republic	22.12	
41	5	Muhammad Aqil Yasmin	Malaysia	22.12	
43	1	Aleksa Kijanović	Serbia	22.16	
44	2	Curtis Brown	United States	22.21	
44	7	Lucanus Robinson	Canada	22.21	
46	8	Wijesundara Mudiyanselage	Sri Lanka	22.24	PB
47	6	Christophe Boulos	Lebanon	22.25	
48	5	Godfred Kofitse	Ghana	22.35	
48	5	Borislav Tonev	Bulgaria	22.35	
50	9	Abdelrahman Abualhummos	Jordan	22.37	Q
51	7	Ali Rashid Al-Marjabi	Oman	22.38	
52	9	Gideon Narib	Namibia	22.42	Q
53	6	Benele Dlamini	Swaziland	22.44	PB
54	1	Jorge Caracassis	Argentina	22.54	
55	8	Luis Iriarte	Peru	22.60	
56	3	Hallgeir Martinsen	Norway	22.70	
57	2	Samuel Mosabata	Botswana	22.78	
58	5	Emil Kaare Strøm	Denmark	22.79	
59	7	Faris Ibrahimpašić	Bosnia and Herzegovina	22.85	
60	1	Mohammed Mahnashi	Saudi Arabia	22.86	
61	7	Sean Michael Kaufman	Philippines	22.91	
62	2	Tang Cho Hin	Macau	22.93	
63	9	Ali Abdoulaye Yataga	Niger	22.96	
64	9	Khereng Nelson Khereng	Lesotho	23.12	
65	2	Krištof Knap	Slovenia	23.69	
	8	Ditiro Sebele	Botswana	DNF	
	7	Andrew Okoye	Nigeria	DQ	R163.3a
	5	Go Yuhei	Philippines	DNS	
	9	Edgar Silwimba	Zambia	DNS	

=== Semifinals ===
Qualification: First 2 in each heat (Q) and the next 2 fastest (q) qualified for the final.

Wind:
Heat 1: +3.1 m/s, Heat 2: +1.0 m/s, Heat 3: -3.2 m/s

Rank	Heat	Name	Nationality	Time	Notes
1	1	Ncincilili Titi	South Africa	20.70	Q
2	1	Yang Chun-han	Chinese Taipei	20.78	Q
3	1	James Linde	Canada	20.80	q
4	2	Ján Volko	Slovakia	20.82	Q
5	2	Joseph Millar	New Zealand	20.90	Q
6	2	Dan-Neil Telesford	Trinidad and Tobago	20.92	q
7	1	Jacarias Martin	United States	20.96	
8	2	Samuli Samuelsson	Finland	20.99	
9	1	Zhang Ruixuan	China	21.03	
10	2	Sho Kitagawa	Japan	21.05	
11	3	Jeffrey John	France	21.08	Q
12	3	Jun Yamashita	Japan	21.20	Q
13	3	Skander Djamil Athmani	Algeria	21.21	
14	3	Vladislav Grigoryev	Kazakhstan	21.23	
15	1	Joachim Maartens	South Africa	21.26	
16	2	Silvan Wicki	Switzerland	21.38	
17	1	Šimon Bujna	Slovakia	21.46	
18	3	Artur Zaczek	Poland	21.64	
19	2	Pius Adome	Uganda	21.74	
20	3	Bastien Mouthon	Switzerland	21.86	
21	3	Ionuţ Andrei Neagoe	Romania	21.87	
22	1	Gideon Narib	Namibia	21.91	
23	3	Abdelrahman Abualhummos	Jordan	22.19	
	2	Aldemir da Silva Júnior	Brazil	DQ	R163.3a

=== Final ===
Wind: -3.8 m/s

Official Video

Rank	Lane	Name	Nationality	Time	Notes
1st place, gold medalist(s)	3	Jeffrey John	France	20.93	
2nd place, silver medalist(s)	1	James Linde	Canada	20.96	
3rd place, bronze medalist(s)	6	Ján Volko	Slovakia	20.99	
4	5	Ncincilili Titi	South Africa	21.00	
5	2	Dan-Neil Telesford	Trinidad and Tobago	21.03	
6	7	Joseph Millar	New Zealand	21.04	
7	4	Yang Chun-han	Chinese Taipei	21.07	
8	8	Jun Yamashita	Japan	21.16	
