= Lovina Onyegbule =

Nigerian Paralympic athlete

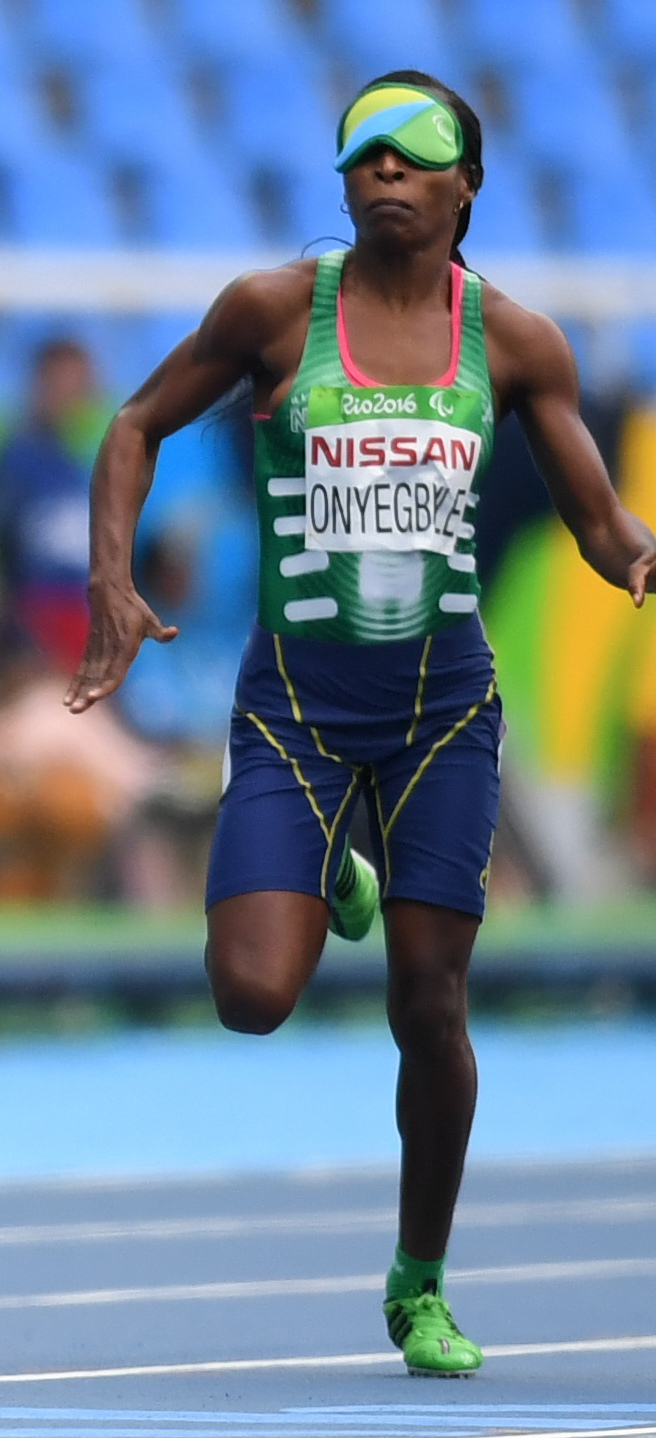

Personal information
- Nationality: Nigerian

Sport
- Country: Nigeria
- Sport: Athletics
Medal record
African Games
Gold medal – first place	2015 Brazzaville	100m T11
Gold medal – first place	2015 Brazzaville	200m T11

Lovina Onyegbule is a Nigerian athlete.

Onyegbule has a visual impairment and competes in T11 and F11 class races. She studied communications at Our Saviour Institute of Science and Technology.

She competed at the 2015 African Games, in Brazzaville, in the Republic of Congo, where she won gold medals in the 100m T11 and 200m T11 events, and at the 2016 Paralympics.
