= Raymond Kibet =

Kenyan sprinter (born 1996)

Personal information
- Born: February 4, 1996 (age 30)
- Education: Louisiana State University
- Height: 1.88 m (6 ft 2 in)
- Weight: 70 kg (150 lb)

Sport
- Country: Kenya
- Sport: Track and field
- Event(s): 400 m, 600 m

Achievements and titles
- Personal best: 45:21, 1:18.57
Medal record
Men's Athletics
Representing Kenya
African Games
Gold medal – first place	2015 Brazzaville	4 × 400 m relay

Raymond Kibet (born February 4, 1996) is a Kenyan sprinter specializing in the 400 m.

He won gold at the 2015 African Games as part of the 4 × 400 metre relay team.

Additionally, he was a finalist and finished 7th the 2015 African Games in the 400 metres. He competed at the 2016 Summer Olympics.
