= Alex Sampao =

Kenyan sprinter

Personal information
- Born: 31 December 1996 (age 29)

Sport
- Country: Kenya
- Sport: Athletics
Medal record
Men's Athletics
Representing Kenya
African Games
Gold medal – first place	2015 Brazzaville	4 x 400 m relay

Alex Sampao (born 31 December 1996) is a Kenyan sprinter.

He won gold at the 2015 African Games as part of the 4x400 metre relay team.

He competed in the men's 400 metres at the 2016 Summer Olympics.

He competed in the man's 800 metres at the 2017 Gavardo Memorial Max Corso (ITA)
