= Skander Djamil Athmani =

Algerian Paralympic athlete

Personal information
- Nationality: Algerian
- Born: 21 June 1992 (age 34) Constantine, Algeria

Sport
- Sport: Paralympic athletics
- Disability class: T13
- Events: 100m, 400m
Medal record
Men's Para-athletics
Representing Algeria
Paralympic Games
Gold medal – first place	2020 Tokyo	400m T13
Gold medal – first place	2024 Paris	100 m T13
Gold medal – first place	2024 Paris	400 m T13
Silver medal – second place	2020 Tokyo	100m T13
World Championships
Gold medal – first place	2024 Kobe	100m T13
Gold medal – first place	2024 Kobe	400m T13
Men's athletics
African Championships
Bronze medal – third place	2014 Marrakesh	4×100m

Skander Djamil Athmani (born 21 June 1992) is an Algerian Paralympic athlete. He made his first Paralympic appearance representing Algeria at the 2020 Summer Paralympics.

== Career ==
Skander initially competed in able-bodied competitions. He competed in the men's 100m, men's 4 × 100 m relay and men's 4 × 400 m relay events at the 2014 African Championships in Athletics. He was part of the men's 4 × 100 m team which claimed bronze medal at the 2014 African Championships. He also represented Algeria at the 2017 Summer Universiade and competed in men's 100m, men's 200m, men's 4×400 relay events.

He took part in the men's 100m T13 event at the 2020 Summer Paralympics and claimed a silver medal in a thrilling final. He clocked 10.54 seconds as he finished just 0.01 seconds behind defending Paralympic champion and veteran para-athlete Jason Smyth of Ireland. Later in that tournament he participated in the men's 400m T13 event where he claimed a gold medal and set a new world record at 46.70 seconds, finishing one second ahead of Morocco's Mohamed Amguoun, who had held the previous world record.
