= Mark Jelks =

American track and field athlete (born 1984)

Mark Elliott Jelks
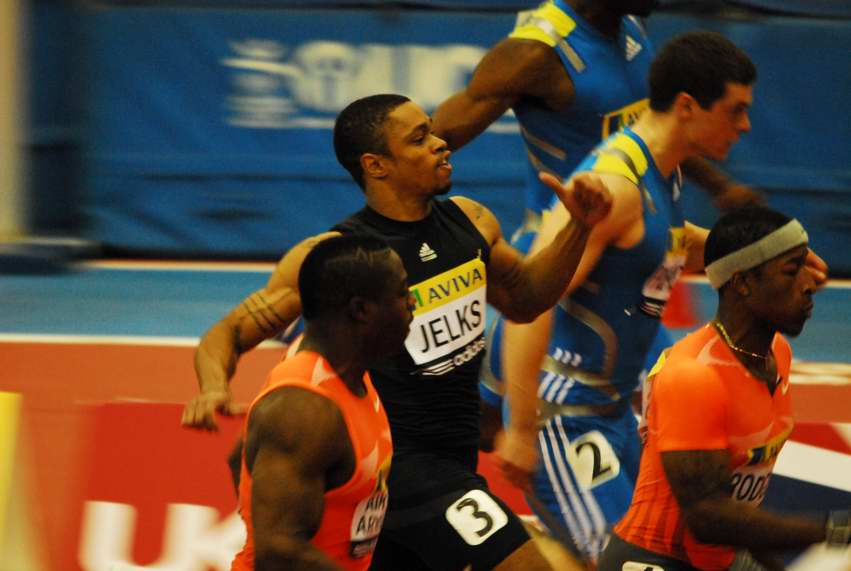
- Jelks at the 2010 Birmingham Indoor Grand Prix

Personal information
- Nationality: United States; Nigeria
- Born: 10 April 1984 (age 42)

Sport
- Sport: Athletics
- Event: Sprint
Medal record
Men's athletics
Representing Nigeria
African Championships
Gold medal – first place	2014 Marrakesh	4×100 m
Silver medal – second place	2014 Marrakesh	100 m
- Updated on 26 August 2016

Mark Elliott Jelks (born April 10, 1984) is an American track and field athlete who specializes in the 100-meter dash. He has a personal best of 9.99 seconds for the event and represented the United States at the 2007 World Championships in Athletics. In 2014, Jelks made a change in eligibility in order to represent Nigeria internationally. He represented his new country at the 2014 Commonwealth Games.

He also competes in the 60-meter dash and won the national title at the 2009 USA Indoor Track and Field Championships with a personal record of 6.51 seconds.

== Career ==
Born in Gary, Indiana, he competed in track and field from a young age and while studying at Gary's West Side High School he became a four-time high school All-American. In 2005 he qualified for six events at the high school state championships, reaching all the sprint and relay events as well as the long jump. After high school he studied at Texas Christian University then Kansas City Kansas Community College, competing for the Kansas City Kansas Blue Devils track and field team. Rather than take part in further collegiate competition, he turned professional in 2005, signing up with Nike.

In his debut professional track season he improved his personal records across the board – he ran 6.63 seconds for the 60-meter dash, 10.02 for the 100 m, and 20.58 seconds for the 200-meter dash. Competing in national events for the first time, he placed fourth in the 60 m at the USA Indoor Track and Field Championships and was fifth in the 100 m at the USA Outdoor Track and Field Championships. He did not perform as well in 2006, with his season highlight being an appearance in the semi-finals of the 200 m. He placed third at the 2007 Boston Indoor Games in a personal record of 6.60 seconds for the 60 m. He placed fourth in that event at the USA Indoors and after that he ran a season's best of 10.04 seconds in the 100 m heats of the USA Outdoors, before going on to finish fourth. The second and third-place finishers, collegiate sprinters Trindon Holliday and Walter Dix, passed up the chance to run at the 2007 World Championships in Athletics and Jelks got the opportunity to compete instead. In his first international appearance, he ended up injured in his first heat in Osaka and came last.

At the 2008 United States Olympic Trials, he broke the 10-second barrier for the first time. He ran 9.99 seconds for third place in the quarter-finals (the fastest ever by a former Indiana high school athlete), However, he was slower in the semi-finals and was eliminated from the Olympic Trials. He began 2009 in Europe and had podium finishes at the PSD Bank Meeting, BW-Bank Meeting and the Athens GP. He won his first national title in the 60 m at USA Indoor Championships with a run of 6.51 seconds – a time which ranked him fourth in the world that year. Turning to the outdoor season, he came first in the 100 m and 200 m at the Meeting Grand Prix IAAF de Dakar and was a semi-finalist at the USA Outdoors with a run of 10.06 seconds. At the Tsiklitiria meet in Athens, he was runner-up in the 100 m with a wind-assisted 9.99 seconds and set a personal best of 20.28 seconds to win the 200 m. He ran a season's best of 10.04 seconds for the 100 m a week later at the Vardinoyannia meet. As one of top 200 m performers that year, he was invited to the 2009 IAAF World Athletics Final and came seventh.

He began the 2010 indoor season in good form, winning the 60 m in Düsseldorf with a time of 6.56 seconds, but was suspended from competition for a doping violation in April. He had failed to notify the United States Anti-Doping Agency of his location on three separate occasions within an 18-month period and in line with World Anti-Doping Agency rules he received a two-year suspension, lasting from August 2010 to 2012.

== Nigeria ==
Mark Jelks switched his allegiance to Nigeria in 2014. He announced his arrival in June 2014 by winning the Nigerian national championships in the 100 metres. A month and a half later Jelks ran his first international competition in a Nigerian uniform, making the final in the 100 metes at the 2014 Commonwealth Games.
