= Kiprono Koskei =

Kenyan sprinter

Kiprono Koskei (born 1988) is a Kenyan sprinter.

He won gold at the 2015 African Games as part of the 4x400 metre relay team. He also competed at 2016 African Championships in Athletics as part of the 400 metres hurdles team.
