= Nickel Ashmeade =

Jamaican sprinter (born 1990)

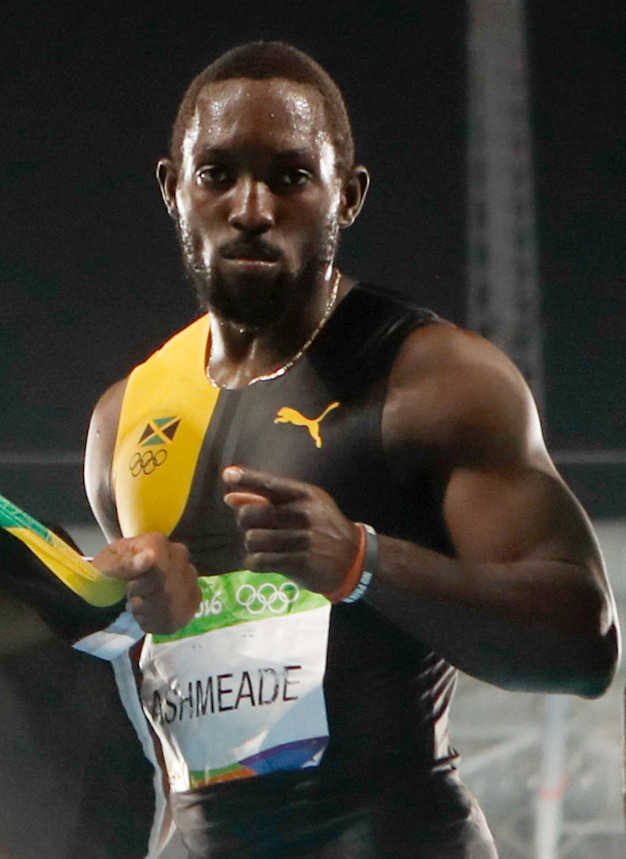
- Ashmeade during Rio 2016

Personal information
- Nationality: Jamaican
- Born: 7 April 1990 (age 36) Ocho Rios, Saint Ann Parish
- Height: 6 ft 0 in (183 cm)
- Weight: 169 lb (77 kg)

Sport
- Sport: Running
- Events: 100 metres, 200 metres

Achievements and titles
- Personal bests: 100 m: 9.90 (Moscow 2013); 200 m: 19.85 (Zurich 2012)
Medal record
Men's athletics
Representing Jamaica
Olympic Games
Gold medal – first place	2016 Rio de Janeiro	4 × 100 m relay
World Championships
Gold medal – first place	2013 Moscow	4 × 100 m relay
Gold medal – first place	2015 Beijing	4 × 100 m relay
World Relay Championships
Gold medal – first place	2015 Nassau	4 × 200 m relay
Silver medal – second place	2015 Nassau	4 × 100 m relay
Bronze medal – third place	2017 Nassau	4 × 200 m relay
Commonwealth Games
Gold medal – first place	2014 Glasgow	4 × 100 m relay
Bronze medal – third place	2014 Glasgow	100 m
Diamond League
First place	2012	200 m
World Junior Championships
Silver medal – second place	2008 Bydgoszcz	200 m
Silver medal – second place	2008 Bydgoszcz	4 × 100 m relay
World Youth Championships
Silver medal – second place	2007 Ostrava	100 m
Bronze medal – third place	2007 Ostrava	200 m
Bronze medal – third place	2007 Ostrava	Medley relay

Nickel Ashmeade (born 7 April 1990) is a retired Jamaican sprinter who specialised in the 100 and 200 meters.

Nickel Ashmeade ran the third leg for Jamaica's 4 × 100 m team at the 2013 World Championships in Moscow which won the gold medal. Nickel Ashmeade finished 5th at the 2013 World Championships in Athletics in the 100 m in Moscow and 4th in the 200 m.

== Career ==
A St. Jago High School teammate of Yohan Blake, Ashmeade first enjoyed success in the sprints as a junior athlete: at the 2006 Central American and Caribbean Junior Championships he beat compatriot Dexter Lee to the 100 m title, was runner-up to Ramone McKenzie over 200 m, and teamed up with the pair to bring Jamaica the 4 × 100 meter relay title. Another medal haul came for the young Jamaican at the 2007 World Youth Championships in Athletics, where he was second to Lee in the 100 m, ran a 200 m best of 20.76 seconds for the bronze medal, and helped the national team to another bronze in the sprint medley relay. He competed at the Penn Relays in 2008 and represented his school, St. Jago High School – an institution renowned for producing track and field athletes.

Ashmeade focused on the 200 m at the 2008 World Junior Championships in Athletics and he took the silver medal in the event, narrowly finishing behind France's Christophe Lemaitre. A second silver came in the 4 × 100 m relay and he departed from his usual oeuvre to help Jamaica to fourth place in the 4 × 400 m relay. The regional CARIFTA Games provided him the opportunity for further junior medals: he won the 200 m title and two relay gold medals at the 2008 edition and almost repeated the feat in 2009, with the sole difference being a 4 × 400 m relay silver. His final international outing as a junior athlete came at the 2009 Pan American Junior Athletics Championships in Port of Spain and he won the 200 m gold in a personal best of 20.40 seconds before going on to take a relay bronze medal.

He made the transition to the senior ranks at the 2009 Central American and Caribbean Championships in Athletics, where he won the 200 m race ahead of Rondel Sorrillo. After a quiet 2010, he made significant improvements at the start of the 2011 outdoor season. In May 2011, he completed his first 200 m in under 20 seconds in Kingston, running 19.96 seconds to surprise the more established Wallace Spearmon and improve upon his previous best by almost half a second. Ashmeade made similar progress in the 100 m at the Ponce Grand Prix later that month, setting a meet record to beat Justin Gatlin, 2004 Olympic and 2005 World champion, with a time of 10.05 seconds (an improvement of 0.24 seconds). Ashmeade competed in the 100 m, 200 m, and 4 × 100 m relay at the 2013 World Championships. After finishing 5th in the 100 m and narrowly coming 4th in the 200 m, Ashmeade was part of the Jamaican 4 × 100 m relay team which won gold.

Ashmeade represented Jamaica in the 2016 Summer Olympics in Rio de Janeiro, Brazil. During his first Olympic Games, he finished fifth place in the semifinal rounds of the men's 100 m with a time of 10.05s and fourth in the 200 m semifinals with 20.31s. He earned his first Olympic medal as the third leg of the 4 × 100 m relay team, anchored by Usain Bolt, with a time of 37.27s.

Ashmeade has won a total of five medals representing Jamaica at the IAAF World Relays. The most recent being at the 2017 edition of the event in which he won a bronze medal in the 4 × 200 m relay. At the 2014 edition, Ashmeade won two gold medals in the 4 × 100 m relay and the 4 × 200 m relay running the first and second leg respectively. At the 2015 edition Ashmeade won a gold and silver. The gold was won in the 4 × 200 m relay whilst running the first leg and the silver was won in the 4 × 100 m relay running the third leg.

== Personal bests ==
Distance	Time	Date	Venue
100 m	9.90 s (+0.4 m/s)	11 August 2013	Moscow, Russia
200 m	19.85 s (+0.0 m/s)	30 August 2012	Zurich, Switzerland

== Achievements ==
Year	Competition	Venue	Position	Event	Notes
Representing Jamaica
2006	Central American and Caribbean Junior Championships (U-17)	Port of Spain, Trinidad and Tobago	1st	100 m	10.60 (1.8 m/s)
2006	Central American and Caribbean Junior Championships (U-17)	Port of Spain, Trinidad and Tobago	2nd	200 m	21.30 (1.6 m/s)
2006	Central American and Caribbean Junior Championships (U-17)	Port of Spain, Trinidad and Tobago	1st	4 × 100 m relay	40.83
2007	World Youth Championships	Ostrava, Czech Republic	2nd	100 m	10.54 (−0.4 m/s)
2007	World Youth Championships	Ostrava, Czech Republic	3rd	200 m	20.76 (−0.2 m/s)
2007	World Youth Championships	Ostrava, Czech Republic	3rd	Medley relay (100 m + 200 m + 300 m + 400 m)	1:52.18
2008	CARIFTA Games (U-20)	Basseterre, Saint Kitts and Nevis	1st	200 m	20.16 w (5.2 m/s)
2008	CARIFTA Games (U-20)	Basseterre, Saint Kitts and Nevis	1st	4 × 100 m relay	39.80
2008	CARIFTA Games (U-20)	Basseterre, Saint Kitts and Nevis	1st	4 × 400 m relay	3:09.71
2008	World Junior Championships	Bydgoszcz, Poland	2nd	200 m	20.84 (−0.9 m/s)
2008	World Junior Championships	Bydgoszcz, Poland	2nd	4 × 100 m relay	39.25
2008	World Junior Championships	Bydgoszcz, Poland	4th	4 × 400 m relay	3:08.58
2009	CARIFTA Games (U-20)	Vieux Fort, Saint Lucia	1st	200 m	20.56 w (2.3 m/s)
2009	CARIFTA Games (U-20)	Vieux Fort, Saint Lucia	1st	4 × 100 m relay	40.05
2009	CARIFTA Games (U-20)	Vieux Fort, Saint Lucia	2nd	4 × 400 m relay	3:11.49
2011	2011 World Championships in Athletics	Daegu, South Korea	5th	200 m	20.29
2013	2013 World Championships in Athletics	Moscow, Russia	5th	100 m	9.98 (−0.3 m/s)
2013	2013 World Championships in Athletics	Moscow, Russia	4th	200 m	20.05 (0.0 m/s)
2013	2013 World Championships in Athletics	Moscow, Russia	1st	4 × 100 m relay	37.36
2014	2014 Commonwealth Games	Glasgow, Scotland	3rd	100 m	10.12 (0.0 m/s)
2014	2014 Commonwealth Games	Glasgow, Scotland	1st	4 × 100 m relay	37.58
2014	World Relay Championships	Nassau, Bahamas	1st	4 × 100 m relay	37.77
2014	World Relay Championships	Nassau, Bahamas	1st	4 × 200 m relay	1:18.63 WR
2015	World Relay Championships	Nassau, Bahamas	1st	4 × 200 m relay	1:20.97
2015	World Relay Championships	Nassau, Bahamas	2nd	4 × 100 m relay	37.68
2015	World Championships	Beijing, China	14th (sf)	100 m	10.06
2015	World Championships	Beijing, China	8th	200 m	20.33
2015	World Championships	Beijing, China	1st	4 × 100 m relay	37.36
2016	2016 Olympic Games	Rio de Janeiro, Brazil	1st	4 × 100 m relay	37.27
2017	World Relay Championships	Nassau, Bahamas, Bahamas	3rd	4 × 200 m relay	1:21.09 SB

=== Track records ===
As of September 2024, Ashmeade holds the following track records for 100 metres and 200 metres.

==== 100 metres ====
Location	Time	Windspeed m/s	Date	Notes
Claremont, Jamaica	9.91	+3.8	11/05/2013	
Glasgow	9.97	+0.3	11/07/2014	Track record shared with Mike Rodgers (USA) from the same race.

==== 200 metres ====
Location	Time	Windspeed m/s	Date
Basseterre	20.16	+5.2	24/03/2008
