= Tim Abeyie =

Ghanaian sprinter

Personal information
- Born: 7 November 1982 (age 43) Westminster, London, Great Britain
Medal record
Men's athletics
Representing Ghana
African Championships
Silver medal – second place	2014 Marrakesh	4×100 m relay
Bronze medal – third place	2012 Porto-Novo	4×100 m relay
Representing Great Britain
Summer Universiade
Bronze medal – third place	2005 Izmir	4x100 m relay
European U23 Championships
Gold medal – first place	2003 Bydgoszcz	4x100m relay

Timothy Akwesi Abeyie (born 7 November 1982 in Westminster, London) is a British-born Ghanaian former sprinter specialising in the 200 metres, who competes for Ghana.

He competed at the 2004 World Indoor Championships, the 2006 World Indoor Championships and the 2006 European Championships without reaching the final. He won a bronze medal in the 4 × 100 metres relay at the 2005 Summer Universiade.

His personal best time is 20.57 seconds, achieved in July 2008 at Eton, Berkshire.

Formerly representing Great Britain, and Wales at Commonwealth level competitions, since June 2011, Abeyie has been cleared to represent Ghana.

Abeyie recorded a positive response to an in-competition drugs test whilst competing in Kaiserslautern, Germany, on 4 July 2015. He was handed a four-year ban from competition on 12 December 2016, which has been retroactively applied. His ban is from 17 July 2015 to 16 July 2019.
