= Monzavous Edwards =

American sprinter

Personal information
- Nationality: United States
- Born: May 7, 1981 (age 45) Opelika, Alabama, U.S.
- Height: 6 ft 0 in (1.83 m)
- Weight: 174 lb (79 kg)

Sport
- Sport: Track and field
- Event: Sprints

Achievements and titles
- Personal bests: 100 m: 10.00 s (New York 2010); 200 m: 20.17 s (Belém 2009)
Medal record
Men's athletics
Representing the United States
Pan American Games
Bronze medal – third place	2007 Rio de Janeiro	4×100 m relay
Bronze medal – third place	2011 Guadalajara	4×100 m relay
NACAC Championships
Gold medal – first place	2007 San Salvador	4×100 m relay
Silver medal – second place	2007 San Salvador	100 m
Representing Nigeria
African Championships in Athletics
Gold medal – first place	2014 Marrakesh	4×100 m
Bronze medal – third place	2014 Marrakesh	100 m

Monzavous "Rae" Edwards (born May 7, 1981) is an American sprint athlete who specialises in the 100 meters.

== Career ==
Edwards began his career as a junior athlete in 2000, winning the USA Junior and Junior College (JUCO) championships in the 100 and 200 meters races.

Edwards competed for Bevill State Community College and Kansas City Kansas Community College in the NJCAA.

He competed at the 2000 World Junior Championships in Athletics and reached the semifinals of the 100 m and quarterfinals of the 200 m. He reached the final of the USA Outdoor Championships in Track and Field in 2003, setting a personal record of 10.09 seconds. He competed at the US Olympic trials for the 2004 Athens Olympics, but did not progress beyond the quarterfinals. He received a public warning that year from the United States Anti-Doping Agency after he tested positive for tetrahydrocannabinol, a compound found in marijuana, which is regarded as a minor infraction. At the 2005 US Outdoor Championships, he posted a personal record tying 10.09 s before finishing sixth in the 100 m final. As a result, he was selected as an alternate for the United States relay team at the 2005 World Championships in Athletics, but he did not compete. At the end of the 2005 season, he ran a new personal best of 10.08 seconds in Malmö, Sweden.

The 2006 and 2007 seasons were largely uneventful, although he was part of the bronze-medal winning relay team at the 2007 Pan American Games. Edwards returned in 2008 to compete at the US Olympic trials for the Beijing Games. He finished tenth in the semifinals but recorded a new best of 10.06 seconds in the qualifying rounds. At the start of the following outdoor season, he significantly improved his 200 m best from 20.46 to 20.17 seconds at the Grande Premio Brasil Caixa de Atletismo. The following month, he improved his 100 m record to 10.02 seconds at the Fanny Blankers-Koen Games in Hengelo, finishing second behind Churandy Martina. Edwards finished third in the national championships with a wind-aided run of 10.00 seconds, gaining qualification into his first ever major senior championships, the 2009 World Championships in Athletics, along with Mike Rodgers and Darvis Patton.

In August 2025, Edwards stated he is a serving a USADA provisional suspension for giving Marvin Bracy the phone number for a doctor that provides performance enhancing drugs. USADA and USATF have not publicly verified the suspension. Edwards alleges there is a large drug-dealing network among United States sprinters.

== Personal bests ==
Event	Time (sec)	Venue	Date
50 meters	5.78	Liévin, France	February 10, 2009
60 meters	6.57	Boston, United States	February 24, 2008
100 meters	10.00	New York City, United States	June 12, 2010
200 meters	20.17	Belém, Brazil	May 24, 2009

- All information taken from IAAF profile.

== See also ==
- List of doping cases in athletics
