= 2014 African Championships in Athletics =

2014 African Championships
- Championships logo
- Dates: 10 August – 14 August
- Host city: Marrakesh, Morocco
- Venue: Stade de Marrakech
- Events: 44
- Participation: 548 athletes from 47 nations
- Records set: Championship records

The 2014 African Championships in Athletics was held in Marrakesh, Morocco from 10 to 14 August 2014. The competition was the 19th edition of Africa senior championships. The competition served as preparation to African athletes for the next continental cup which is planned to hold on 13 and 14 September 2014 in Marrakech. It was the second time that Morocco had hosted the event.

== Medal summary ==
=== Men ===
Chronology: 2010 | 2012 | 2014 | 2016 | 2018

Event	Gold		Silver		Bronze	
100 metres	Wilfried Koffi Hua; Ivory Coast	10.05	Mark Jelks; Nigeria	10.07	Monzavous Edwards; Nigeria	10.16
200 metres	Wilfried Koffi Hua; Ivory Coast	20.25	Isaac Makwala; Botswana	20.51	Carvin Nkanata; Kenya	20.53
400 metres	Isaac Makwala; Botswana	44.23 CR	Wayde van Niekerk; South Africa	45.00	Boniface Mucheru; Kenya	45.07
800 metres	Nijel Amos; Botswana	1:48.54	Mohammed Aman; Ethiopia	1:48.56	Taoufik Makhloufi; Algeria	1:49.08
1500 metres	Ayanleh Souleiman; Djibouti	3:42.49	Asbel Kiprop; Kenya	3:42.58	Ronald Kwemoi; Kenya	3:42.59
5000 metres	Caleb Mwangangi Ndiku; Kenya	13:34.27	Isiah Koech; Kenya	13:35.73	Abrar Osman; Eritrea	13:36.42
10,000 metres	Nguse Tesfaldet Amlosom; Eritrea	28:11.07	Mustapha El Aziz; Morocco	28:11.36	Josphat Bett Kipkoech; Kenya	28:11.61
110 m hurdles	Tyron Akins; Nigeria	13.57	Alex Al-Ameen; Nigeria	13.78	Martins Ogieriakhi; Nigeria	13.80
400 m hurdles	Cornel Fredericks; South Africa	48.78	Cristian Morton; Nigeria	48.92	Nicholas Bett; Kenya	49.03
3000 m steeplechase	Jairus Birech; Kenya	8:34.79	Jonathan Ndiku; Kenya	8:37.67	Ezekiel Kemboi; Kenya	8:39.30
4 × 100 m relay	Nigeria; Ogho-Oghene Egwero; Monzavous Edwards; Obinna Metu; Mark Jelks	38.80	Ghana; Daniel Gyasi; Solomon Afful; Emmanuel Dasor; Tim Abeyie	39.28	Algeria; Mahmoud Hammoudi; Ali Bouguesba; Skander Djamil Athmani; Soufiane Bouhadda	39.89
4 × 400 m relay	Botswana; Pako Seribe; Nijel Amos; Leaname Maotoanong; Isaac Makwala	3:01.89	Nigeria; Noah Akwu; Robert Simmons; Miles Ukaoma; Cristian Morton	3:03.09	Kenya; Mark Mutai; Solomon Buoga; Nicholas Bett; Boniface Mucheru	3:07.35
20 km walk	Lebogang Shange; South Africa	1:26.58	Samuel Gathimba; Kenya	1:27.11	Mohamed Ameur; Algeria	1:27.48
High jump	Kabelo Kgosiemang; Botswana	2.28	Fernand Djoumessi; Cameroon	2.25	Younis Mohamed; Sudan	2.22
Pole vault	Cheyne Rahme; South Africa	5.41 CR	Mohamed Romdhana; Tunisia	5.00	Mouhcine Cheaouri; Morocco	5.00
Long jump	Zarck Visser; South Africa	8.08	Godfrey Khotso Mokoena; South Africa	8.02	Ruswahl Samaai; South Africa	7.84
Triple jump	Godfrey Khotso Mokoena; South Africa	17.03	Tosin Oke; Nigeria	16.97	Roger Haitengi; Namibia	16.72
Shot put	Orazio Cremona; South Africa	19.84	Jaco Engelbrecht; South Africa	18.87	Franck Elemba; Republic of the Congo	18.74
Discus throw	Victor Hogan; South Africa	62.87	Russell Tucker; South Africa	62.15	Stephen Mozia; Nigeria	57.11
Hammer throw	Mostafa Al-Gamel; Egypt	79.09 CR	Chris Harmse; South Africa	73.90	Driss Barid; Morocco	60.17
Javelin throw	Julius Yego; Kenya	84.72	Ihab Abdelrahman; Egypt	83.59	John Robert Oosthuizen; South Africa	77.81
Decathlon	Larbi Bourrada; Algeria	8311 CR	Guillaume Thierry; Mauritius	7312	Atsu Nyamadi; Ghana	6946

=== Women ===
Chronology: 2010 | 2012 | 2014 | 2016 | 2018

Event	Gold		Silver		Bronze	
100 metres	Blessing Okagbare; Nigeria	11.00 CR	Murielle Ahouré; Ivory Coast	11.03	Marie Josée Ta Lou; Ivory Coast	11.20
200 metres	Murielle Ahouré; Ivory Coast	22.36	Marie Josée Ta Lou; Ivory Coast	22.87	Dominique Duncan; Nigeria	22.98
400 metres	Folashade Abugan; Nigeria	51.21	Kabange Mupopo; Zambia	51.21	Patience Okon George; Nigeria	51.68
800 metres	Eunice Sum; Kenya	1:59.45	Janeth Jepkosgei; Kenya	1:59.74	Agatha Jeruto; Kenya	1:59.84
1500 metres	Hellen Obiri; Kenya	4:09.53	Dawit Seyaum; Ethiopia	4:10.92	Rababe Arafi; Morocco	4:12.08
5000 metres	Almaz Ayana; Ethiopia	15:32.72 CR	Genzebe Dibaba; Ethiopia	15:42.16	Janet Kisa; Kenya	15:54.04
10,000 metres	Joyce Chepkirui; Kenya	32:45.27	Emily Chebet; Kenya	32:45.28	Belaynesh Oljira; Ethiopia	32:49.39
100 m hurdles	Rikenette Steenkamp; South Africa	13.26	Rosvitha Okou; Ivory Coast	13.26	Nichole Denby; Nigeria	13.27
400 m hurdles	Wenda Nel; South Africa	55.32	Amaka Ogoegbunam; Nigeria	55.46	Francisca Koki Manunga; Kenya	55.84
3000 m steeplechase	Hiwot Ayalew; Ethiopia	9:29.54 CR	Sofia Assefa; Ethiopia	9:30.20	Salima El Ouali Alami; Morocco	9:33.02
4 × 100 m relay	Nigeria; Gloria Asumnu; Lawretta Ozoh; Dominique Duncan; Blessing Okagbare	43.56	Ivory Coast; Tryphene Kouame Adjoua; Mireille Parfaite Gaha; Adeline Gouenon; Marie Josée Ta Lou	43.99	Ghana; Flings Owusu-Agyapong; Gemma Acheampong; Beatrice Gyaman; Janet Amponsah	44.06
4 × 400 m relay	Nigeria; Patience Okon George; Regina George; Ada Benjamin; Folashade Abugan	3:28.87	Kenya; Jacinter Shikanda; Francisca Koki Manunga; Janeth Jepkosgei; Maureen Jelagat Maiyo	3:32.26	Botswana; Goitseone Seleka; Lydia Mashila; Loungo Matlhaku; Christine Botlogetswe	3:40.28
20 km walk	Grace Wanjiru Njue; Kenya	1:37.04	Emily Wamusyi Ngii; Kenya	1:38.12	Askale Tiksa; Ethiopia	1:40.05
High jump	Rhizlane Siba; Morocco	1.80	Besnet Mohamed; Egypt	1.80	Ariyat Dibow; Ethiopia	1.78
Pole vault	Syrine Balti; Tunisia	4.10	Nisrine Dinar; Morocco	3.80	Dorra Mahfoudhi; Tunisia	3.70
Long jump	Ese Brume; Nigeria	6.50	Chinaza Amadi; Nigeria	6.40	Joëlle Mbumi Nkouindjin; Cameroon	6.25
Triple jump	Joëlle Mbumi Nkouindjin; Cameroon	14.02	Nadia Eke; Ghana	13.40	Blessing Ibrahim; Nigeria	13.35
Shot put	Auriol Dongmo Mekemnang; Cameroon	16.84	Chinwe Okoro; Nigeria	16.40	Lezaan Jordaan; South Africa	15.31
Discus throw	Chinwe Okoro; Nigeria	59.79 CR	Nwanneka Okwelogu; Nigeria	51.66	Amina Moudden; Morocco	48.21
Hammer throw	Lætitia Bambara; Burkina Faso	65.44	Amy Sène; Senegal	64.66	Sarah Bensaad; Tunisia	60.97
Javelin throw	Sunette Viljoen; South Africa	65.32 CR	Zuta Mary Nartey; Ghana	52.57	Selma Rosun; Mauritius	48.04
Heptathlon	Marthe Koala; Burkina Faso	5454	Elizabeth Dadzie; Ghana	5286	Bianca Erwee; South Africa	5086

== Medal table ==
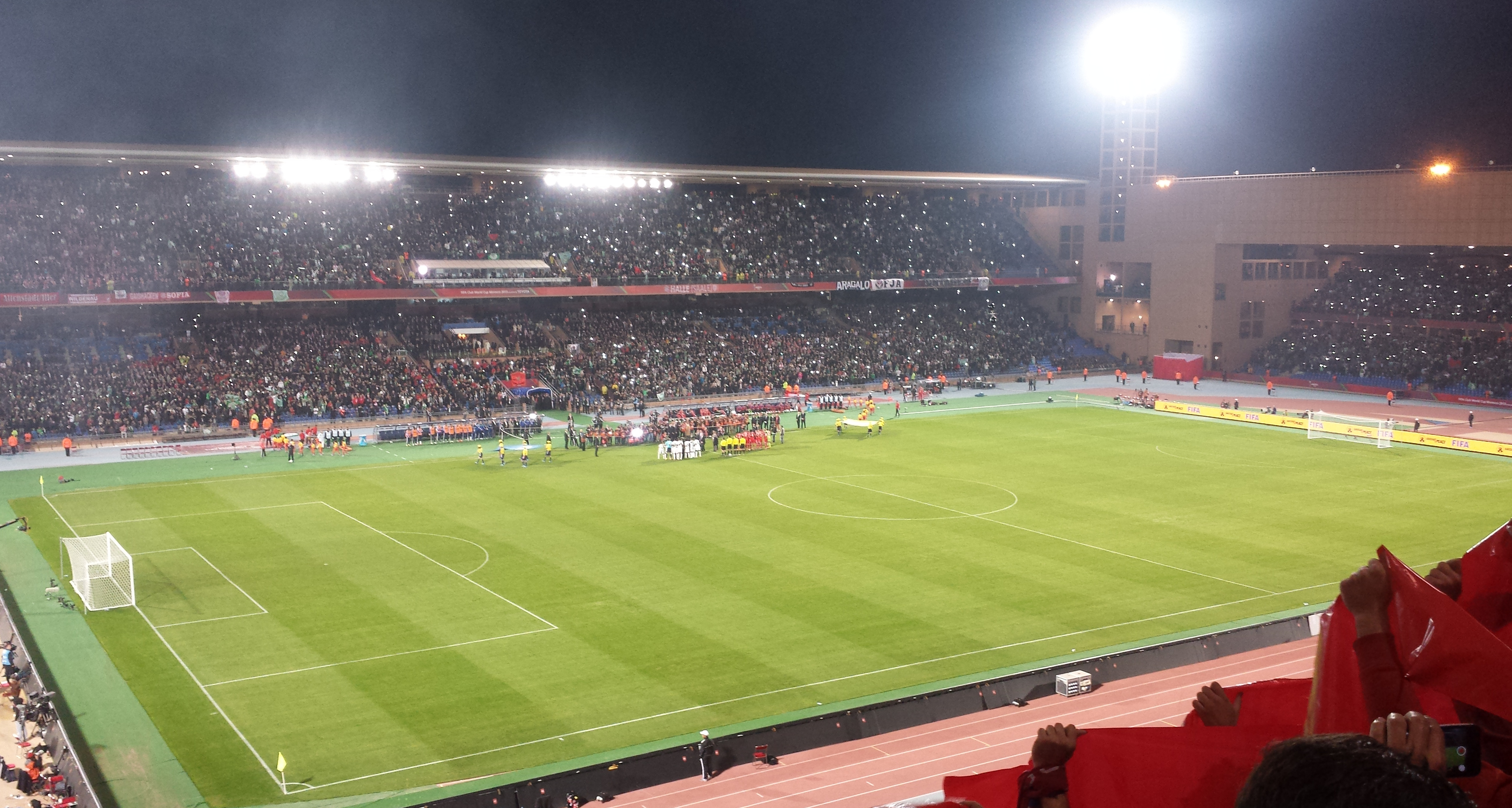
Host stadium in Marrakech.

* Host nation (Morocco)

Rank	Nation	Gold	Silver	Bronze	Total
1	South Africa (RSA)	10	5	4	19
2	Nigeria (NGR)	8	9	7	24
3	Kenya (KEN)	7	8	10	25
4	Botswana (BOT)	4	1	1	6
5	Ivory Coast (CIV)	3	4	1	8
6	Ethiopia (ETH)	2	4	2	8
7	Cameroon (CMR)	2	1	1	4
8	Burkina Faso (BUR)	2	0	0	2
9	Morocco (MAR)*	1	2	5	8
10	Egypt (EGY)	1	2	0	3
11	Tunisia (TUN)	1	1	2	4
12	Algeria (ALG)	1	0	3	4
13	Djibouti (DJI)	1	0	1	2
13	Eritrea (ERI)	1	0	1	2
15	Ghana (GHA)	0	4	2	6
16	Mauritius (MRI)	0	1	1	2
17	Senegal (SEN)	0	1	0	1
17	Zambia (ZAM)	0	1	0	1
19	Congo (CGO)	0	0	1	1
19	Namibia (NAM)	0	0	1	1
19	Sudan (SUD)	0	0	1	1
Totals (21 entries)		44	44	44	132

== Participating nations ==
- Algeria (25)
- Angola (8)
- Benin (11)
- Botswana (16)
- Burkina Faso (5)
- Burundi (5)
- Cameroon (20)
- Cape Verde (1)
- Chad (1)
- Central African Republic (1)
- Comoros (4)
- Democratic Republic of the Congo (1)
- Djibouti (4)
- Egypt (12)
- Equatorial Guinea (2)
- Eritrea (11)
- Ethiopia (69)
- Gabon (1)
- Gambia (2)
- Ghana (24)
- Guinea (1)
- Guinea-Bissau (1)
- Ivory Coast (11)
- Kenya (55)
- Lesotho (1)
- Libya (7)
- Madagascar (3)
- Mali (11)
- Mauritania (2)
- Mauritius (9)
- Morocco (host) (55)
- Mozambique (1)
- Namibia (6)
- Nigeria (41)
- Republic of the Congo (18)
- São Tomé and Príncipe (1)
- Senegal (14)
- Seychelles (8)
- South Africa (37)
- Sudan (1)
- Swaziland (2)
- Tanzania (2)
- Togo (2)
- Tunisia (20)
- Uganda (6)
- Zambia (8)
- Zimbabwe (2)

== See also ==
- 2014 European Athletics Championships
