= Simon Magakwe =

South African sprinter

Medal record

Men's athletics

Representing South Africa

African Championships
Gold medal – first place	2010 Nairobi	4×100 m
Gold medal – first place	2012 Porto-Novo	100 m
Gold medal – first place	2012 Porto-Novo	4×100 m
Gold medal – first place	2018 Asaba	4×100 m
Bronze medal – third place	2010 Nairobi	100 m
Bronze medal – third place	2010 Nairobi	200 m
Bronze medal – third place	2018 Asaba	100 m

World Relays
Silver medal – second place	2019 Yokohama	4×200 m

Simon Petrus Magakwe (25 May 1986 in Itsoseng) is a sprinter from South Africa. In 2010 he competed at the 2010 African Championships in Nairobi and won the bronze medal in both the 100 metres and the 200 metres. He was the first South African to run under 10 second, with a personal best of 9.98 seconds.

== Doping rule violation ==
On 22 December 2014 Magakwe refused to submit to out-of-competition testing. He was subsequently handed a two-year ban from sport for the anti-doping rule violation.
