= Ogho-Oghene Egwero =

Nigerian sprinter (born 1988)

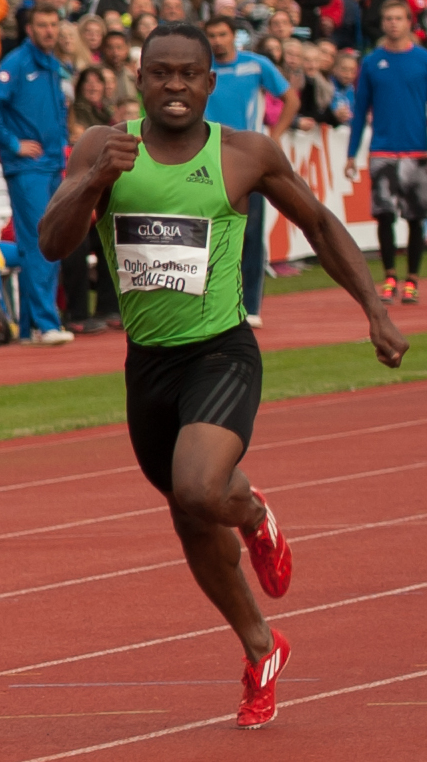
- Ogho-Oghene Egwero in 2015

Personal information
- Born: 26 November 1988 (age 37) Enugu, Nigeria
- Height: 1.67 m (5 ft 5 1/2 in)
- Weight: 65 kg (143 lb)
Medal record
Men's athletics
Representing Nigeria
All-Africa Games
Silver medal – second place	2015 Brazzaville	100 m
African Championships
Gold medal – first place	2014 Marrakesh	4×100 m
Silver medal – second place	2010 Nairobi	4×100 m
Silver medal – second place	2012 Porto-Novo	4×100 m
Silver medal – second place	2018 Asaba	4×100 m

Ogho-Oghene Omano Egwero (born 26 November 1988) is a Nigerian sprinter who specializes in the 100 metres.

He competed at the 2009, 2011 and 2013 World Championships and the 2010 and 2016 World Indoor Championships. He represented Nigeria at the 2012 and 2016 Olympics and the 2014 Commonwealth Games.

His personal best times are 6.60 seconds in the 60 metres (indoor), achieved in February 2011 in Düsseldorf; and 10.06 seconds in the 100 metres, achieved first in 2011 in Maputo and again in 2015 in Brazzaville.
