= 2003 World Youth Championships in Athletics =

- Host city: Sherbrooke, Quebec, Canada
- Events: 39
- Dates: 9–13 July
- Main venue: Université de Sherbrooke Stadium

The 2003 World Youth Championships in Athletics was the third edition of the international athletics competition for youth (under-18) athletes organised by the IAAF. It was held in Sherbrooke, Canada from the 9–13 July at the Université de Sherbrooke Stadium.

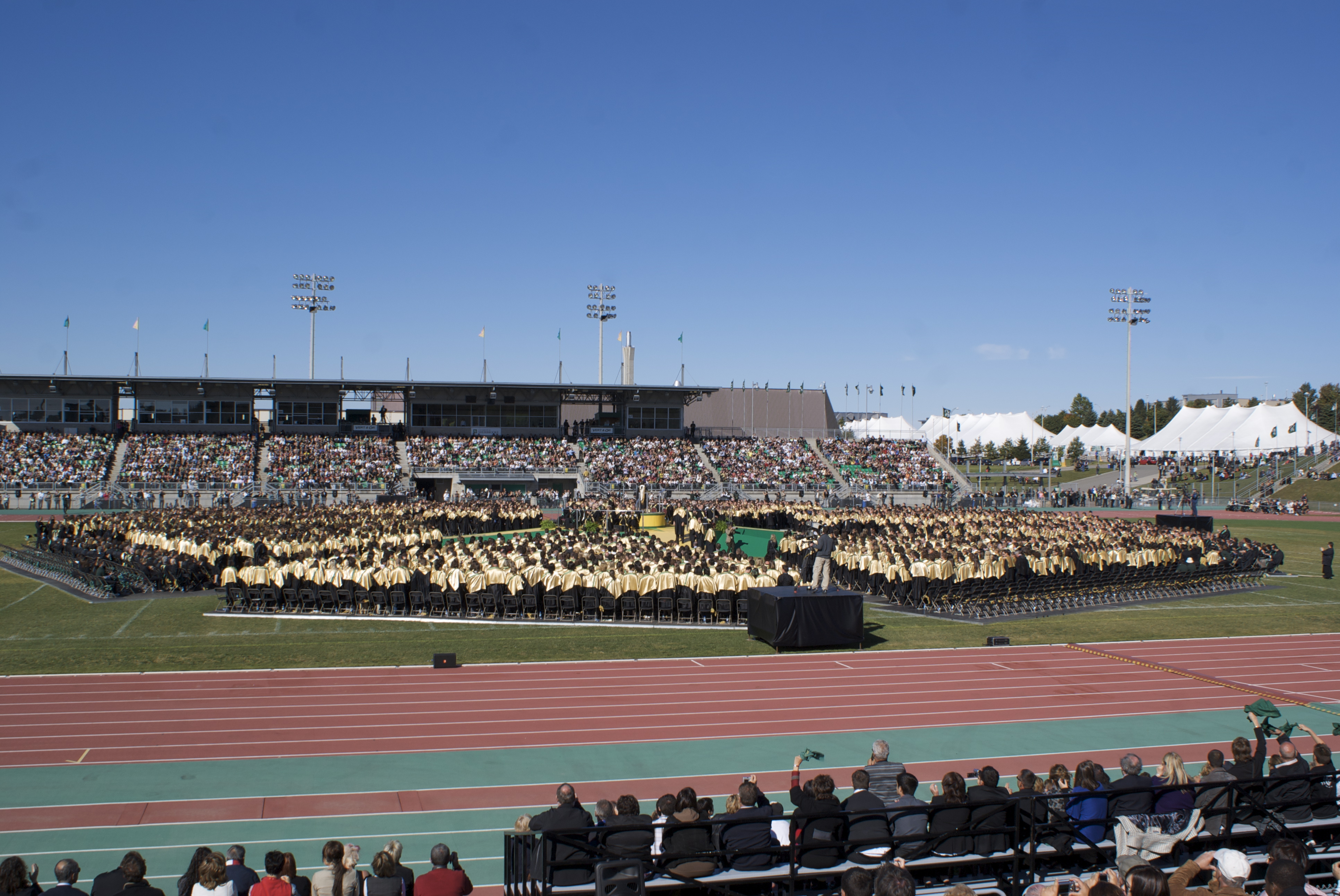
Host stadium in Sherbrooke.

== Results ==
=== Boys ===
Event	Gold		Silver		Bronze	
100 metres	Yahya Al-Gahes; Saudi Arabia	10.69	Yahya Hassan I. Habeeb; Saudi Arabia	10.73	Craig Pickering; Great Britain	10.85
200 metres	Usain Bolt; Jamaica	20.40 CR	Michael Grant; United States	21.04	Jamahl Alert; Great Britain	21.35
400 metres	Nagmeldin Ali Abubakr; Sudan	46.10 CR	Demiko Goodman; United States	46.42	Željko Vincek; Croatia	47.45
800 metres	Mohammed Al-Salhi; Saudi Arabia	1:48.79 CR	Bernard Kiptanui; Kenya	1:49.14	Abraham Kipngetich; Kenya	1:49.17
1500 metres	Benson Marrianyi; Kenya	3:44.94 PB	Samson Kiplangat; Kenya	3:45.13	Isaac Mboyaza; South Africa	3:48.05 PB
3000 metres	Augustine Choge; Kenya	7:52.53	Tariku Bekele; Ethiopia	7:54.71 PB	Shimelis Girma; Ethiopia	7:55.12 PB
2000 m steeplechase	Ronald Kipchumba; Kenya	5:30.27 WYR	Justus Kipchirchir; Kenya	5:31.24 PB	Chris Winter; Canada	5:44.23 PB
110 m hurdles 91.4 cm	Jason Richardson; United States	13.29 WYL	Mubarak Al-Mabadi; Saudi Arabia	13.41 PB	Alexander John; Germany	13.50 PB
400 m hurdles 84.0 cm	Jason Richardson; United States	49.91 WYL	Wouter le Roux; South Africa	50.85 PB	Jamaal Charles; United States	51.48 PB
10,000 m track walk	Aleksandr Prokhorov; Russia	42:16.16 CR	Makoto Sawada; Japan	42:17.62 PB	Vyacheslav Golovin; Russia	42:37.15 SB
Medley relay	United States; Jay Cooper; Michael Grant; Jamaal Charles; Cedric Goodman	1:52.03 WYL	Poland; Dariusz Kuć; Kamil Witkowski; Rafał Błocian; Ziemowit Ryś	1:53.08 SB	Japan; Shinya Saburi; Kenji Fujimitsu; Naohiro Shinada; Go Tanabe	1:53.11 SB
High jump	Martin Gunther; Germany	2.11	Oleksandr Nartov; Ukraine	2.11	Hikaru Tsuchiya; Japan	2.11
Pole vault	Germán Chiaraviglio; Argentina	5.15	Dmitry Starodubtsev; Russia	5.10 PB	Steven Lewis; Great Britain	5.05 PB
Long jump	Naohiro Shinada; Japan	7.61	Yves Renaux; France	7.44	Andrejs Maskancevs; Latvia	7.05
Triple jump	Dennis Fernández; Cuba	15.77	Mousa Abdou Alkam Qarqaran; Saudi Arabia	15.60 PB	Mohamed Abbas Darwish; United Arab Emirates	15.55
Shot put 5 kg	Liu Feng; China	21.45 WYR	Kyle Helf; Canada	20.79 PB	Ameen Al-Aradi; Saudi Arabia	19.69 PB
Discus throw 1.5 kg	Ronnie Buckley; Australia	64.34 CR	Wu Jian; China	63.18 PB	Yao-Hui Wang; Chinese Taipei	60.00
Hammer throw 5 kg	Mikhail Levin; Russia	76.41	Kristóf Németh; Hungary	75.59	Sándor Pálhegyi; Hungary	75.47 PB
Javelin throw 700 g	Julio Cesar de Oliveira; Brazil	81.16 CR	John Robert Oosthuizen; South Africa	81.07 PB	Raldu Potgieter; South Africa	75.56 PB
Octathlon	Andrés Silva; Uruguay	6456 WYR	Andrei Krauchanka; Belarus	6366	Lukaš Patera; Czech Republic	6316 PB

=== Girls ===
Event	Gold		Silver		Bronze	
100 metres	Jessica Onyepunuka; United States	11.31 CR	Krystin Lacy; United States	11.50	Kelly-Ann Baptiste; Trinidad and Tobago	11.58
200 metres	Anneisha McLaughlin; Jamaica	23.26	Courtney Champion; United States	23.56	Cleo Tyson; United States	23.67
400 metres	Natasha Hastings; United States	53.41	Antonina Krivoshapka; Russia	53.54 PB	Jaimee-Lee Hoebergen; Australia	53.78 PB
800 metres	Mariya Shapaeva; Russia	2:03.40 CR	Olga Cristea; Moldova	2:04.30 PB	Larisa Arcip; Romania	2:04.31 PB
1500 metres	Alem Techale; Ethiopia	4:17.41 PB	Jelena Ština; Latvia	4:17.43	Joyce Jepkosgei Musungu; Kenya	4:17.65 PB
3000 metres	Siham Hilali; Morocco	9:12.70 PB	Pasalia Kipkoech Chepkorir; Kenya	9:13.77	Yuko Nohara; Japan	9:14.82
100 metres hurdles 76.2 cm	Sally McLellan; Australia	13.42	LaToya Greaves; Jamaica	13.49	Domenique Manning; United States	13.60
400 metres hurdles	Zuzana Hejnova; Czech Republic	57.54 CR	Yekaterina Kostetskaya; Russia	58.37	Mackenzie Hill; United States	59.15
5000 m track walk	Vera Sokolova; Russia	22:50.23	Ann Loughnane; Ireland	23:37.00 PB	Noriko Nishide; Japan	23:50.69
Medley relay	United States; Jessica Onyepunuka; Alexandria Anderson; Krystin Lacy; Natasha Hastings	2:03.87 WYL	Jamaica; Samantha Henry-Robinson; Sherline Duncan; Sonita Sutherland; Anneisha McLaughlin	2:07.05 PB	Russia; Yelena Kremneva; Yelena Khvashchevskaya; Anastasiya Shuvalova; Antonina Krivoshapka	2:07.52 PB
High jump	Iryna Kovalenko; Ukraine	1.92 CR	Annett Engel; Germany; Svetlana Shkolina; Russia	1.86 PB; 1.86	–	
Pole vault	Lisa Ryzih; Germany	4.05	Sviatlana Makarevich; Belarus	4.00 PB	Charmaine Lucock; Australia	4.00 PB
Long jump	Cristine Spataru; Romania	6.41 CR	Denisa Ščerbová; Czech Republic	6.40 PB	Hanna Demydova; Ukraine	6.15
Triple jump	Cristine Spataru; Romania	13.86 CR	Elina Sorsa; Finland	12.95	Aliki-Yvoni Askitopoulou; Greece	12.93 PB
Shot put	Jiang Limin; China	15.60 WYL	Magdalena Sobieszek; Poland	15.42 PB	Marli Knoetze; South Africa	15.10
Discus throw	Lisandra Rodriguez; Cuba	48.56	Julie Bennell; Australia	48.32	Kristina Gehrig; Germany	48.31
Hammer throw	Valentina Srša; Croatia	61.18	Mariya Bespalova; Russia	57.81	Johanna Hoppe; Germany	56.46
Javelin throw	Xue Juan; China	56.82 CR	Bo-Ra Shin; South Korea	53.74 PB	Vivian Zimmer; Germany	52.20
Heptathlon	Marisa De Aniceto; France	5458	Sarah Kern; Germany	5445	Marina Ponyarova; Russia	5338 PB

== Medals table ==
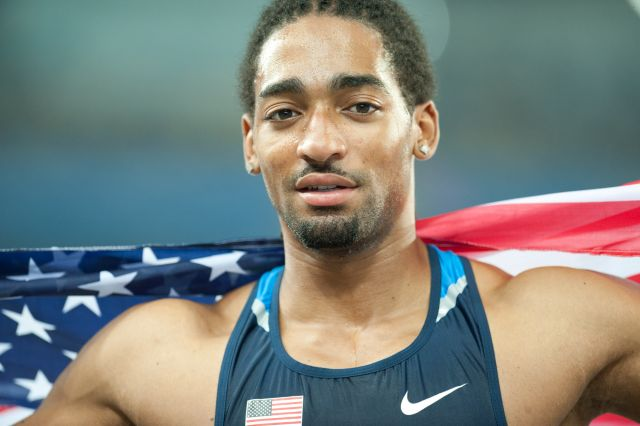
Jason Richardson of the United States won the 110/400m hurdles double.

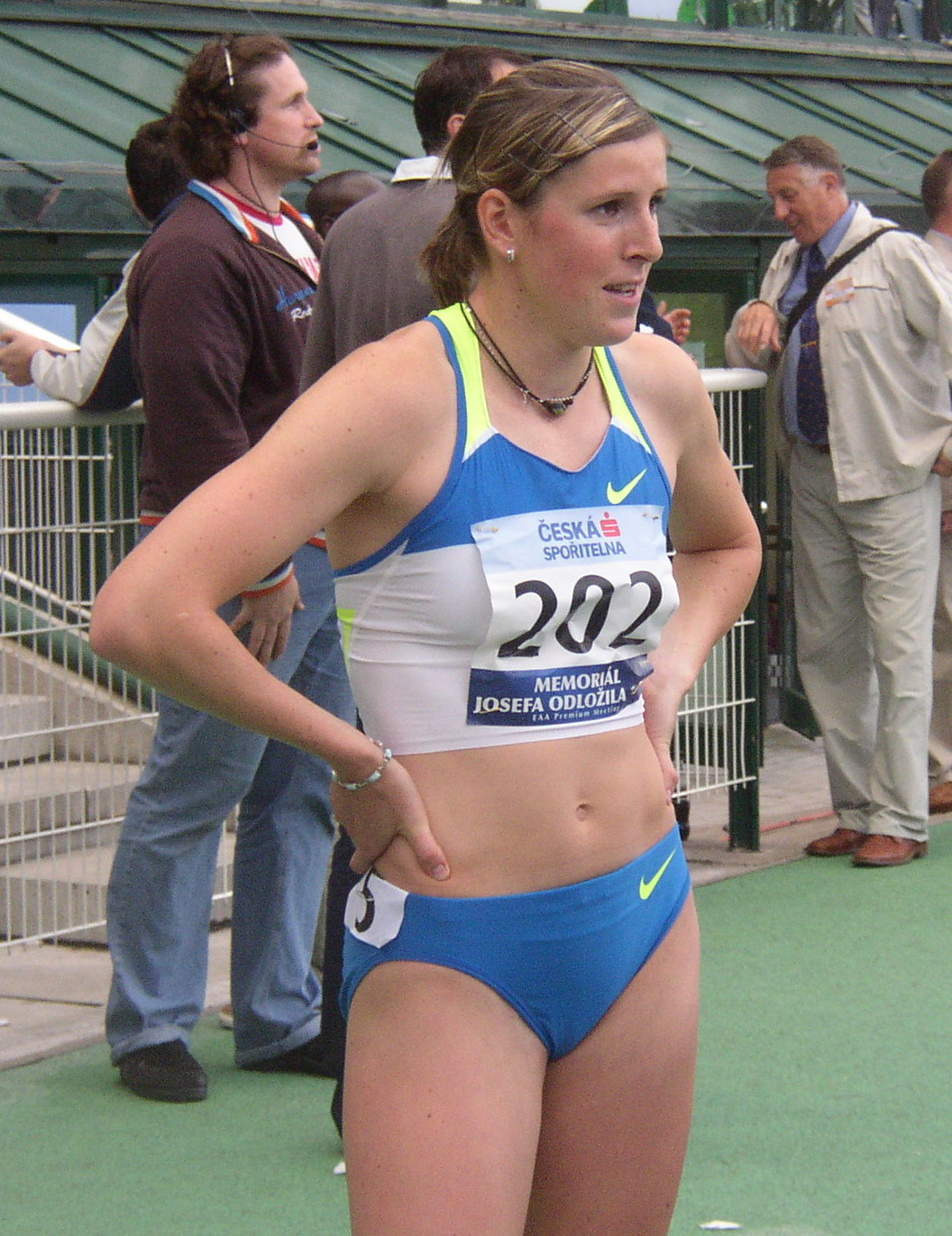
Zuzana Hejnová won the gold for the Czech Republic in the women's 400 metres hurdles.

Rank	Nation	Gold	Silver	Bronze	Total
1	United States (USA)	6	4	4	14
2	Russia (RUS)	4	5	3	12
3	Kenya (KEN)	3	4	2	9
4	China (CHN)	3	1	0	4
5	Saudi Arabia (KSA)	2	3	1	6
6	Germany (GER)	2	2	4	8
7	Jamaica (JAM)	2	2	0	4
8	Australia (AUS)	2	1	2	5
9	Romania (ROM)	2	0	1	3
10	Cuba (CUB)	2	0	0	2
11	Japan (JPN)	1	1	4	6
12	Czech Republic (CZE)	1	1	1	3
12	Ethiopia (ETH)	1	1	1	3
12	Ukraine (UKR)	1	1	1	3
15	France (FRA)	1	1	0	2
16	Croatia (CRO)	1	0	1	2
17	Argentina (ARG)	1	0	0	1
17	Brazil (BRA)	1	0	0	1
17	Morocco (MAR)	1	0	0	1
17	Sudan (SUD)	1	0	0	1
17	Uruguay (URU)	1	0	0	1
22	South Africa (RSA)	0	2	3	5
23	Belarus (BLR)	0	2	0	2
23	Poland (POL)	0	2	0	2
25	Canada (CAN)	0	1	1	2
25	Hungary (HUN)	0	1	1	2
25	Latvia (LAT)	0	1	1	2
28	Finland (FIN)	0	1	0	1
28	Ireland (IRL)	0	1	0	1
28	Moldova (MDA)	0	1	0	1
28	South Korea (KOR)	0	1	0	1
32	Great Britain (GBR)	0	0	3	3
33	Chinese Taipei (TPE)	0	0	1	1
33	Greece (GRE)	0	0	1	1
33	Trinidad and Tobago (TRI)	0	0	1	1
33	United Arab Emirates (UAE)	0	0	1	1
Totals (36 entries)		39	40	38	117
