= Lisandra =

Lisandra is a given name. Notable people with the name include:

- Lisandra Espinosa (born 1986), Cuban team handball player
- Lisandra Guerra (born 1987), Cuban racing cyclist
- Lisandra Ramos Martinez (born 1987), artist and designer from Cuba
- Lisandra Rodriguez (born 1986), Cuban female discus thrower
- Lisandra Salvador (born 1990), Angolan handball player
- Lisandra Tena, American actress
- Lisandra Teresa Ordaz Valdés (born 1988), Cuban chess player
