= Reggie Wyatt =

American hurdler (born 1990)

Personal information
- Nationality: American
- Born: September 17, 1990 (age 36) Torrance, California, U.S.
- Height: 6 ft 5 in (1.96 m)

Sport
- Sport: Running
- Events: 400 metres, 400 metres hurdles
- College team: USC Trojans

Achievements and titles
- Personal bests: 400 m: 46.13 (Clovis 2009); 400 m hurdles: 49.17 (Los Angeles 2013)
Medal record
Men's athletics
Representing the United States
Pan American Junior Championships
Bronze medal – third place	2009 Port of Spain	400 m hurdles
World Youth Championships
Silver medal – second place	2007 Ostrava	400 m hurdles

Reginald Wyatt (born September 17, 1990) is an American hurdler. He is the current holder of the NFHS (United States High School) record in the 300 meters intermediate hurdles at 35.02, set while winning a preliminary race at the CIF California State Meet on June 5, 2009 at Buchanan High School in Clovis, California. Wyatt won the State Meet the following day, but his time of 36.71 was not destined to be record material after he also won the 400 metres in 46.13 earlier at the same meet.

Wyatt ran his senior year for La Sierra High School in Riverside, California. His points from the meet led La Sierra to a four way tie for the State team title. He started his hurdling career running for John W. North High School and made a controversial transfer between the schools for his junior year, which cost him a year of eligibility. As a sophomore at North, Wyatt pushed Jeshua Anderson into breaking the national record that had been held by George Porter for 22 years. Wyatt's time was 35.90, the national sophomore record. Later in 2007, Wyatt was part of the national youth record setting 4 × 400 metres relay team. Wyatt was the silver medalist at the 2007 World Youth Championships in Athletics in Ostrava, Czech Republic behind American William Wynne.

As a junior in 2008, Wyatt was relegated to running the 400 meters hurdles against non-high school competition. He ran unattached in the Adidas Track Classic and held his own against elite level competition, finishing in 50.54 from lane one.

In 2009, he won the USATF Junior Outdoor Track & Field Championships in 50.02 and he ran 49.78, the fifth best high school time for 400 hurdles, while winning the United States Junior Olympics. At the 2009 Pan American Junior Athletics Championships in Port of Spain, Trinidad he again lost to rival Wynne but still took home a bronze medal.

2010 brought Wyatt to the University of Southern California. As a freshman, he improved his time to 49.46, while qualifying for the NCAA Men's Outdoor Track and Field Championship at the West Region prelims, which currently ranks him number 7 on the USC all-time list, behind Porter, Olympian, one time world record holder Geoff Vanderstock and World and Olympic Champion Felix Sanchez. While qualifying for the final, he finished last well behind Johnny Dutch, Jeshua Anderson and his previous times.

In 2013 Wyatt, running for the University of Southern California won the 400 hurdles at the NCAA championships at Eugene, OR. In 2014, he graduated from USC.

== Personal life ==
On May 29, 2021, Wyatt married Tyreebee Whaley.
