= D'Angelo Cherry =

American sprinter (born 1990)

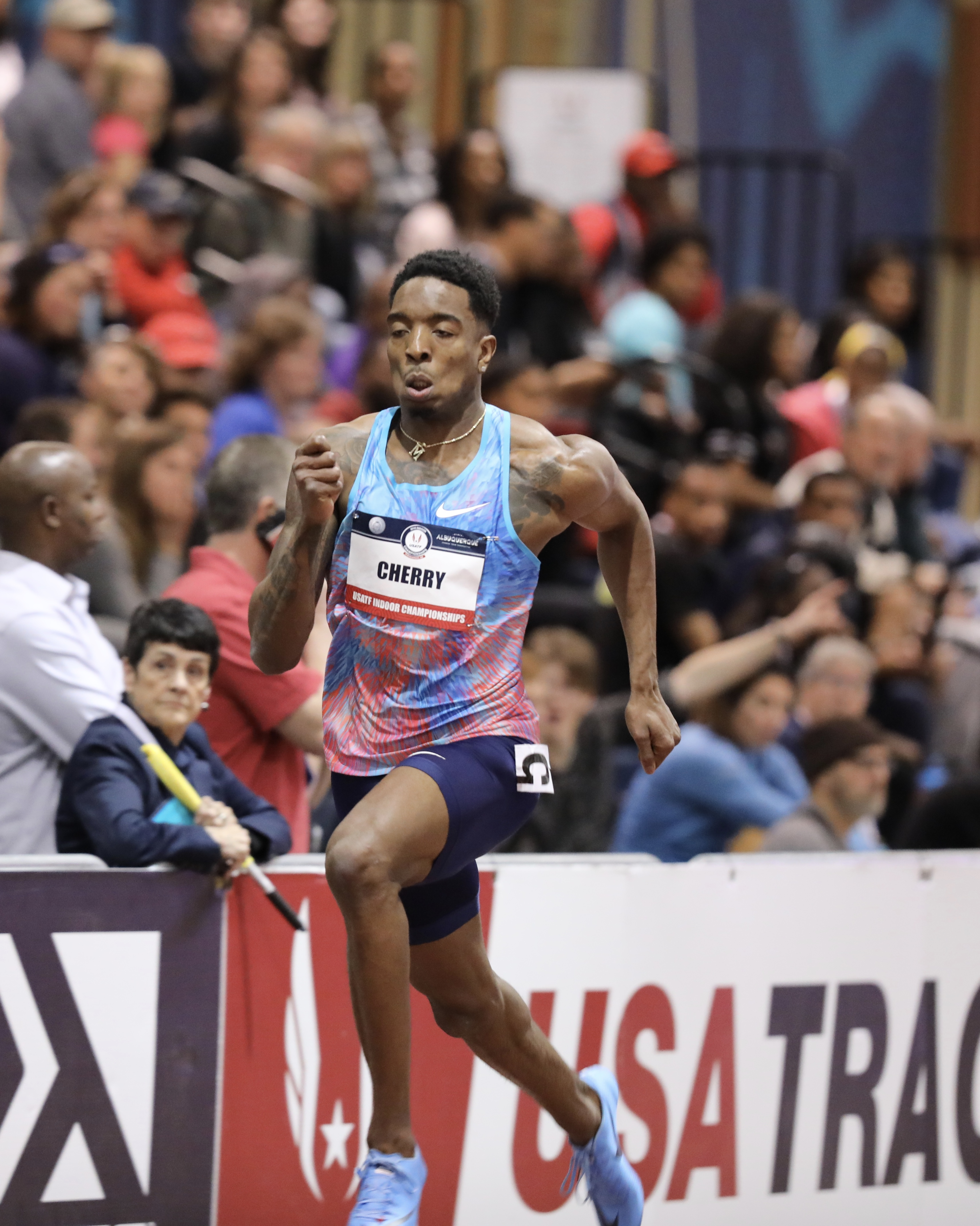
- Cherry at the 2018 USA Indoor Track and Field Championships

Personal information
- Nationality: United States
- Born: August 1, 1990 (age 36) Biloxi, Mississippi
- Height: 5 ft 4 in (1.63 m)
- Weight: 136 lb (62 kg)

Sport
- Sport: Track and field
- Events: 60 meters, 100 meters, 200 meters

Achievements and titles
- Personal bests: 100 m: 10.04 s (Fayetteville 2009); 200 m: 20.96 s (Jonesboro 2008)
Medal record
Men's athletics
Representing the United States
Pan American Junior Championships
Gold medal – first place	2009 Port-of-Spain	4×100 m relay
Silver medal – second place	2009 Port-of-Spain	100 m

D'Angelo Cherry (born August 1, 1990) is an American sprinter, who specializes in the 60, 100 and 200 meters. He graduated from Mississippi State University in December 2012. Cherry was recruited by Steve Dudley in Jonesboro, Georgia in 2008.

== Career ==
Cherry took part in the 2009 Pan American Junior Athletics Championships in Port-of-Spain, where he won a silver medal over 100 meters in 10.17 seconds, only behind Marcus Rowland. He also helped the United States 4 × 100 m relay squad to a gold medal.

Cherry also set the record in the 2008 National Scholastic Indoor Championship in the 60 m (6.64) and holds the fastest time ever run for a high school athlete ENROUTE in the 55-meter dash which also stands as the 55 m record at the national scholastic meet (6.14). He was also the Georgia state record holder in the 100 m 4AAAA (10.33) and held the all-time record for Georgia (10.24)(10.16 w).

In 2009, Cherry set the United States American junior record in the 60 m dash at the 2009 USA Boston Indoor Championships placing second (6.52). He was one hundredth of a second off the world junior record. His personal best in the 55 m dash in 6.14, in 60 m is 6.49, and 100 m is 10.04 seconds, which is the fourth fastest ever run by a junior athlete. He also became a three-time All-American in the 100 m dash, 60 m dash and 4x1 which placed fifth. 2009 Track and field championships.

Cherry was the 2009 and 2011 USA indoor silver medalist (6.52, 6.54). He qualified for the 2012 USA indoor championship, placing as the bronze medalist against Trell Kimmons and Justin Gatlin. Cherry began college at Mississippi State University in 2009, and did not compete in the NCAA indoor championships until 2011 due to the title 9 rule which states men and women must have an equal amount of sports. From 2003 until 2011 the men's indoor track and field team were not eligible to compete indoors at the SEC or NCAA indoor championships under Mississippi State University, but were free to compete at the USA indoor championships. Owing to this technicality Cherry will never compete at SEC championships indoors. Mississippi State men indoor track and field team became eligible again in 2011 to compete at the NCAA level, but not the SEC championships due to the men's indoor team not being part of the SEC conference. After great deliberation in 2012 by the NCAA clearing house, Cherry was granted two more years of eligibility to compete indoors because he had not competed at the NCAA championships until 2011. Other SEC schools attempted to form a petition for Cherry not to compete at the 2013 NCAA championships due to eligibility reasons, and the fact that the week prior he competed at the 2013 USA indoor championships and took the gold medal at the 2013 USA Indoor championships running a USA leading time of 6.49, just one hundredths of a second off the world's fastest time in 2013. Despite the petition he went on and then competed at the 2013 NCAA indoor championships the following weekend, and was crowned the 2013 NCAA 60 Indoor Champion. Cherry made his name in collegiate history by being the first man in history technically to ever win the USA Indoor Championships and the NCAA Indoor Championships in the 60 m in the same year since the metric system converted yards to meters. He was also the first to double in an event since the year of 1995. His 6.49 also is the fastest performance in collegiate since the year 2001, and marks the sixth fastest time in college history in the 60 m.

Still having another attempt to compete indoors for Mississippi State, Cherry signed with the Asics America in California shortly after his indoor season in June 2013 (2013-2015). He was the only American based Asics signed Professional sprinter since Tim Montgomery.

== Personal best ==
Distance	Time	Venue
60 m	6.49 s	Albuquerque, New Mexico, USA (March 3, 2013)
100 m	10.04 s	Fayetteville, Arkansas, USA (June 10, 2009)
200 m	20.89 s	Jonesboro, Georgia, USA (April 2, 2008)
