= Mac Fleet =

American mid-distance runner (born 1990)

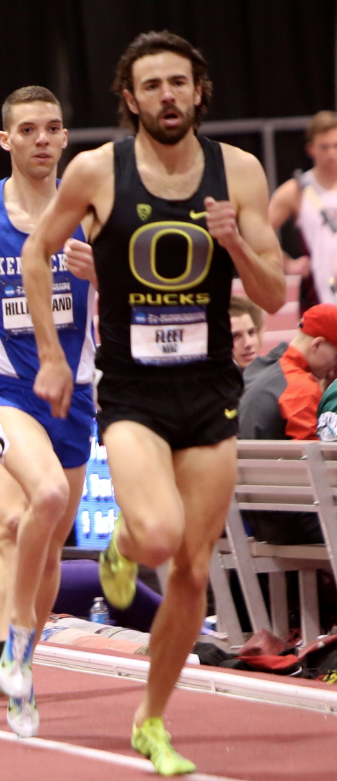
- Mac Fleet competing in the 1500m event at the 2014 NCAA Division I Indoor Track and Field Championships.

Personal information
- Nationality: American
- Born: October 17, 1990 (age 36) San Diego, California, U.S.
- Height: 1.90 m (6 ft 3 in)

Sport
- Country: United States
- Sport: Track, middle-distance running
- Events: 1500 meters, mile, 10,000 meters
- College team: Oregon Ducks
- Club: The Mission Athletics Club
- Team: Nike
- Turned pro: 2014
- Coached by: Jen Rhines

Achievements and titles
- Personal bests: 1500 m: 3:38.35; 2013; 800 m: 1:46.32; 2013; 10 km road: 30:09; 2016
Medal record
Men's athletics
Representing the United States
Pan American Junior Championships
Gold medal – first place	2009 Port-of-Spain	1500 m

Mac Fleet (born October 17, 1990, in San Diego, California) is an American mid-distance runner. Fleet won two 1500 m NCAA titles in the 2013 NCAA Division I Outdoor Track and Field Championships and 2014 NCAA Division I Outdoor Track and Field Championships. Mac Fleet won in 1500 meters at 2009 Pan American Junior Athletics Championships.

== Competition Record ==
At 2015 Morton Games, Fleet placed 7th in mile in 3:58.48. In 2016, Fleet placed 8th in the Hoka One One USATF Middle Distance Classic 1500 m in 3:40.20 and 9th in the Prefontaine Classic mile in 4:06.10. In 2017, Fleet placed 6th in Dana Point 10 km road race in 30:19, 14th in Carlsbad 5000 road race in 14:38, 9th in the Portland Track Festival 1500 m in 3:39.49. In 2018, Fleet placed 8th in the Millrose Games Mile in 4:03.14, and 8th in the Sydney Athletics Grand Prix 1500 m in 3:45.08.

Year	Competition	Venue	Position	Event	Notes
Representing United States
2009	Pan American Junior Athletics Championships	Port of Spain	1st	1500 m	3:48.04
US Championships
2017	USATF Outdoor Championships	Sacramento, California	15th	1500 m	3:41.42
2015	USATF Outdoor Championships	Hayward Field	17th	1500 m	3:46.55
2013	USATF Outdoor Championships	Des Moines, Iowa	6th	1500 m	3:46.06
2009	USA Junior Outdoor Track & Field Championships	Hayward Field	1st	1500 m	3:47.44
2009	Nike Outdoor Nationals Track & Field Championships	North Carolina A&T State University	4th	800 m	1:51.58
2009	Nike Indoor Nationals	Reggie Lewis Track and Athletic Center	3rd	Mile	4:08.65

== NCAA ==
Mac Fleet is a 3 time Pac-12 team champion. As a freshman, Fleet was part of a team at University of Oregon won a 2010 Penn Relays wheel in the DMR in 9:30.69. At the 2012 NCAA Division I Cross Country Championships, Fleet helped Oregon Ducks to place 20th as a team. At the 2013 NCAA Division I Cross Country Championships, Fleet helped Oregon Ducks to place 5th as a team. Fleet won two 1500 m NCAA titles in the 2013 NCAA Division I Outdoor Track and Field Championships and 2014 NCAA Division I Outdoor Track and Field Championships. After a senior year in July 2014 Heusden-Zolder KBC Night of Athletics Belgium, ran 1500 m in 3:38.62.

Representing Oregon Ducks
Year	Pac-12 Conference Cross Country	NCAA Cross Country	MPSF indoor	NCAA indoor	Pac-12 Conference Outdoor	NCAA Outdoor
2013-14	25:23.0 10th	31:05.0 77th		Mile 4:02.96 3rd	800 m 1:50.67 3rd	1500 m 3:39.09 1st
2012-13		32:04.9 220th		Mile 4:02.18 12th	1500 m 3:42.20 3rd	1500 m 3:50.25 1st
2011-12						
2010-11			DMR 9:26.78 1st	Mile 4:08.16 16th		
2010-11			DMR 9:26.78 1st	DMR 9:48.00 10th		
2009-10	24:11.8 33rd			Mile 4:01.63 2nd	1500 m 3:43.21 6th	1500 m 3:45.08 31st

== University City High school (San Diego) ==
Mac Fleet won 2008 California state Cross country Division 3 title for University City High School (San Diego). Fleet won 2009 CIF California State Meet 1600 m in 4:05.33.

Mac Fleet graduated from University City High School (San Diego) as a 2-time California Interscholastic Federation state champion. His father, Dale Fleet, was also a CIF State Champion, winning the 1971 CIF California State Meet in the 2 mile run running for Clairemont High School.

Representing University City High School (San Diego) at California Interscholastic Federation state championship
Year	Cross Country Div 3	Outdoor Track
2008-09	1st 15:08.0	1st in the 1600 m (4:05.33)
2008-09	1st 15:08.0	CIF San Diego Section 1st 1600 m (4:09.46)
2007-08		3rd in the 1600 m (4:13.33)
2007-08		CIF San Diego Section 1st 1600 m (4:12.81)
2007-08		CIF San Diego Section 6th 4 × 400 m (3:25.49)
2006-07	9th 15:37.0	2nd in the 1600 m (4:08.09)
2006-07	9th 15:37.0	CIF San Diego Section 2nd 1600 m (4:14.49)
2005-06		
2005-06		CIF San Diego Section 1st 800 m (1:55.72)
