= Chalonda Goodman =

American sprinter (born 1990)

Personal information
- Nationality: American
- Born: September 29, 1990 (age 35) Newnan, Georgia

Sport
- Sport: Running
- Event: Sprints
- College team: Texas Longhorns

Achievements and titles
- Personal bests: 100m: 11.22 (Port of Spain 2009); 200m: 22.85 (Gainesville 2012)
Medal record
Women's athletics
Representing the United States
Pan American Junior Championships
Gold medal – first place	2009 Port of Spain	100 m
Gold medal – first place	2009 Port of Spain	200 m
Gold medal – first place	2009 Port of Spain	4×100 m relay
World Youth Championships
Gold medal – first place	2007 Ostrava	Medley relay
Silver medal – second place	2007 Ostrava	200 m

Chalonda Deatrice Goodman (born September 29, 1990) is an American sprinter who specializes in the 100 meters and 200 metres. She participated in the 2007 World Youth Championships in Athletics, winning a silver in the 200 metres.

A native of Newnan, Georgia, Goodman attended Newnan High School, where she was a two-time All-USA track and field selection by USA Today. She now attends the University of Texas at Austin.

Her older brother, Demiko Goodman, is also a successful track athlete.
