= Feng Liu =

Feng Liu may refer to:

- Liu Feng, Chinese Han dynasty general
- Liu Feng (athlete), Chinese shot putter
- Feng Liu (physicist), material physicist
