= Liu Feng =

Liu Feng may refer to:

- Liu Feng (athlete) (Chinese: 刘锋; born 1987), Chinese male shot putter
- Liu Feng (general) (Chinese: 刘封; died 220), Chinese general and adopted son of Liu Bei
- Liu Feng (politician) (Chinese: 刘枫; born 1937), Chinese politician
