= Keyth Talley =

American sprinter (1990–2019)

Personal information
- Nationality: American
- Born: March 13, 1990 Tuscaloosa, Alabama
- Died: October 23, 2019 (aged 29) Round Rock, Texas
- Height: 6 ft 0 in (1.83 m)
- Weight: 160 lb (73 kg)

Sport
- Sport: Running
- Event(s): 100 metres, 200 metres
- College team: LSU Tigers

Achievements and titles
- Personal best(s): 100 m: 10.19s (Austin Tx 2011); 200 m: 20.78 s (Port of Spain, 2009)
Medal record
Men's athletics
Representing the United States
Pan American Junior Championships
Gold medal – first place	2009 Port of Spain	4 × 100 m relay
Silver medal – second place	2009 Port of Spain	200 m

Keyth Talley (born March 13, 1990 – October 23, 2019) was a United States sprinter who specialized in the 100 and 200 meters races. Talley spent his freshman and sophomore year at the University of North Texas and his junior and senior seasons at Louisiana State University.

In his freshman year at North Texas, Talley was named the Sun Belt Conference Freshman of the Year in both the indoor and outdoor seasons, the only male athlete to accomplish that feat in school history. He also became the first athlete in North Texas history to win gold at the National Junior Championship, winning the 200-meter dash (20.86).

At the 2009 Pan American Junior Athletics Championships in Port of Spain, Trinidad and Tobago, Talley won a silver medal in the 200 meters with a personal best of 20.78 seconds. He also helped the U.S. squad to a gold medal in the 4 × 100 meters relay. Talley was the first North Texas Mean Green athlete to medal at the Pan American Junior Athletics Championships.
