= Sean Keveren =

American long-distance runner

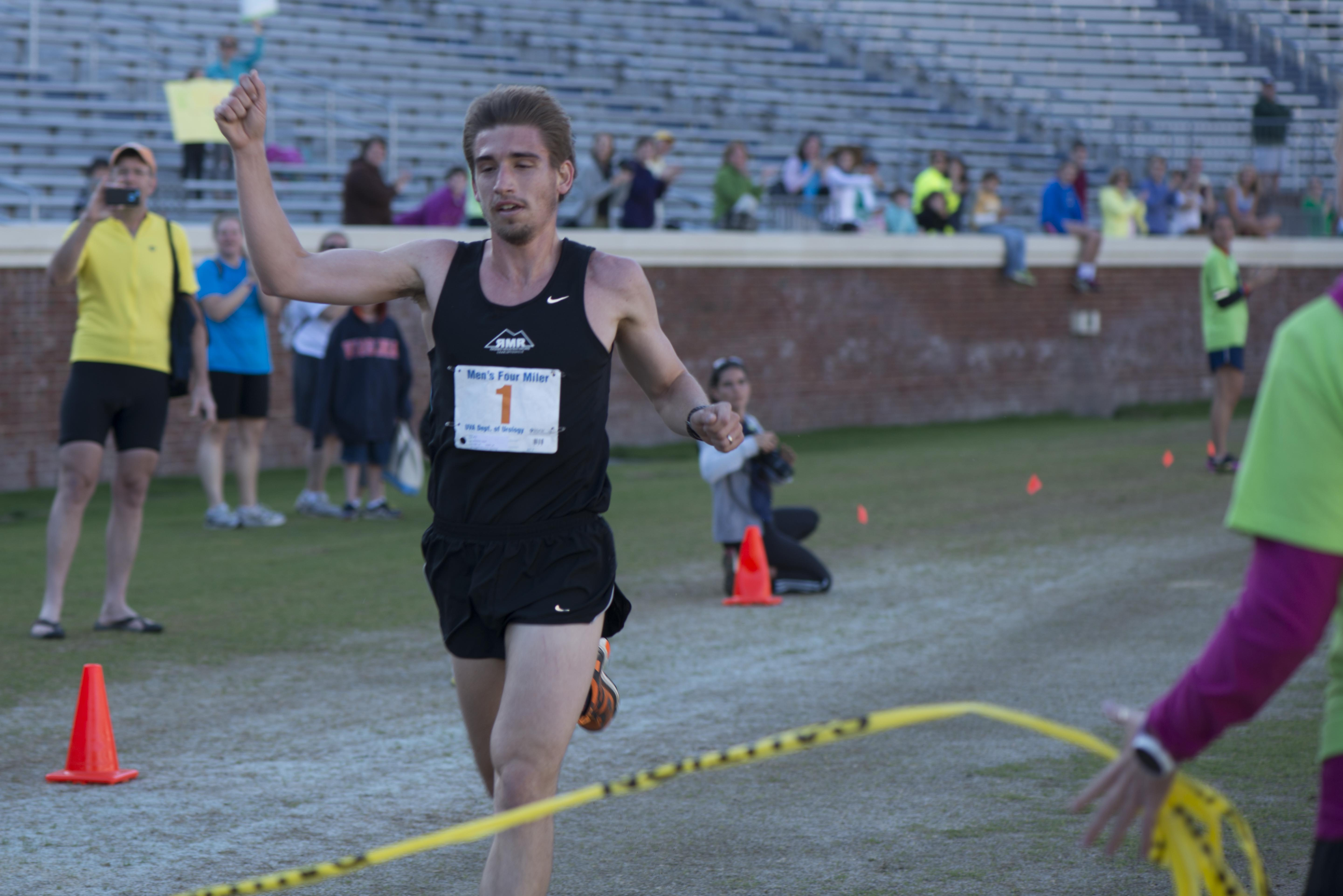
- Keveren winning the 2014 Charlottesville Men's Four Miler

Personal information
- Nationality: American
- Born: June 17, 1990 (age 36) Brentwood, Tennessee, U.S.

Sport
- Sport: Track
- Events: 5000 meters, 10,000 meters
- College team: Virginia
- Club: Ragged Mountain Racing

Achievements and titles
- Personal bests: Mile: 4:02.98; 5000m: 13:39.26; 10,000m: 29:09.33
Medal record
Men's athletics
Representing United States
Pan American Junior Championship
Silver medal – second place	2009 Port of Spain	Men's 5000 meters
- Updated on September 13, 2015

Sean Keveren (born 17 June 1990) is an American runner who specializes in long-distance disciplines. He represented the United States at the 2009 Pan American Junior Athletics Championships.

== Running career ==
=== Youth career ===
Keveren ran for Brentwood High in Brentwood, Tennessee. He was coached by David Milner. He won two AAA state XC championships, two AAA state 1,600m championships, and two AAA state 3,200m championships. As Keveren became recognized as one of the top high school athletes in the country, he ran for the United States in the boy's 5000-meter race at the 2009 Pan American Junior Athletics Championships, where he placed second, finishing in a time of 14:14.46 (min:sec).

=== Collegiate ===
Keveren ran for University of Virginia, where he would specialize in the 5000 meters and 10,000 meters distances. He was redshirted in his freshman year, but still finished ahead of all of his upper-classmen teammates in the 2009 Cavalier Open. He finished in 18th in the men's 10,000 meter-race with a time of 29:31.86 (min:sec) at the 2012 NCAA Outdoor Track Championship, earning All-American honors. In 2013, he graduated and did not compete in his last year at University of Virginia.

=== Post-collegiate ===
After graduating, he joined Ragged Mountain Racing and began racing at various invitationals and road races. He was a member of the RMR squad which competed at the 2014 USATF Club Cross Country Championships, where he finished the men's 10K in 30:53.08, placing 74th overall. On March 21, 2015, Keveren won the Charlottesville 10-Miler and broke the course record which was previously set in 1989 by Ken Frenette.

== Personal life ==
Sean resides in Franklin, TN just south of Nashville with his wife and son. He is an avid University of Virginia Basketball fan.
