= Demiko Goodman =

American sprinter (born 1986)

Personal information
- Nationality: American
- Born: March 17, 1986 (age 40) Newnan, Georgia
- Height: 6 ft 2 in (1.88 m)
- Weight: 190 lb (86 kg)

Sport
- Sport: Running
- Event: Sprints
- College team: Georgia Bulldogs

Achievements and titles
- Personal bests: 200m: 20.80 (Albuquerque 2004); 400m: 45.94 (Mobile 2004)
Medal record
Men's athletics
Representing the United States
World Youth Championships
| Gold medal – first place | 2003 Sherbrooke | Medley relay |
| Silver medal – second place | 2003 Sherbrooke | 400 m |

Cedric Demiko Goodman (born March 17, 1986) is an American sprinter who specializes in the 200 meters and 400 metres. He participated in the 2003 World Youth Championships in Athletics, winning a silver in the 400 metres.

A native of Newnan, Georgia, Goodman attended Newnan High School. Goodman later attended the University of Georgia, where he also played football besides competing in track. He was part of the 2008 Bulldogs team that started the season as preseason No. 1.

Goodman was available in the 2009 NFL draft, but went undrafted. He was later signed by the Pittsburgh Steelers, but was released before the 2009 season began.

He now attends Austin Graduate School of Theology and has signed a sponsorship deal with Adidas, pursuing a spot on the 2012 U.S. Olympic squad.

His younger sister, Chalonda Goodman, is also a successful track athlete.
