= William Wynne (hurdler) =

American hurdler (born 1990)

Personal information
- Nationality: American
- Born: January 30, 1990 (age 36) Marietta, Georgia, U.S.

Sport
- Sport: Running
- College team: Florida Gators

Achievements and titles
- Personal bests: 110m hurdles: 13.64 (Gainesville 2009); 400m hurdles: 49.01 (Ostrava 2007)
Medal record
Men's athletics
Representing the United States
Pan American Junior Championships
Gold medal – first place	2009 Port-of-Spain	400 m hurdles
World Youth Championships
Gold medal – first place	2007 Ostrava	400 m hurdles
Gold medal – first place	2007 Ostrava	medley relay
Silver medal – second place	2007 Ostrava	110 m hurdles

William Wynne (born January 30, 1990) is an American hurdler who specializes in the 400 metre hurdles. He currently holds the world youth best in the 400 m hurdles (84 cm) with a time of 49.01 seconds, 0.85 seconds under the previous record set by South Africa's Marnus Kritzinger in 1999. He won two gold medals and a silver medal at the 2007 World Youth Championships in Athletics, which also earned him the 2007 USATF Youth Athlete of the Year award. Wynne is a graduate of McEachern High School in Powder Springs, Georgia.

Awards
Preceded by Gabrielle Mayo	USA Track & Field Youth Athlete of the Year; 2007	Succeeded by Jordan Hasay
