= George Porter (hurdler) =

American hurdler (born 1966)

Personal information
- Born: December 19, 1966 (age 59) Lompoc, California, United States

Sport
- Sport: Track and field
Medal record
Representing United States
Summer Universiade
Silver medal – second place	1989 Duisburg	4x400m relay

George Porter (born December 19, 1966) is a retired American hurdler. While running for Cabrillo High School in Lompoc, California, he set the NFHS (United States High School) record in the 300 meters intermediate hurdles at 35.32 on May 24, 1985, in the CIF Southern Section Masters Meet (a qualifying meet for the CIF California State Meet). Porter's record in the hurdles lasted until the State Meet in 2007, when Jeshua Anderson of Taft High School improved the record by .04 of a second. Reggie Wyatt has since improved the record again to 35.02, set at the same meet in 2009. Porter went on to win the State Meet with a time of 35.50.

Porter's key to success was his ability to run 13 steps between hurdles, the same trait as Olympic champion Edwin Moses. Moses could run 13 steps between all ten hurdles of the 400 metres hurdles race, while Porter was able to do it for six as a junior, adding the last two hurdles the high school race his senior year.

Porter continued hurdling in college, running for the University of Southern California, but did not perform as well. He managed to run 49.19, number 5 on USC's all-time list. Porter entered the American top ten in the 400 hurdles twice, in 1989 and 1990.
