= University City High School (San Diego) =

Public high school in San Diego, California, United States

University High School
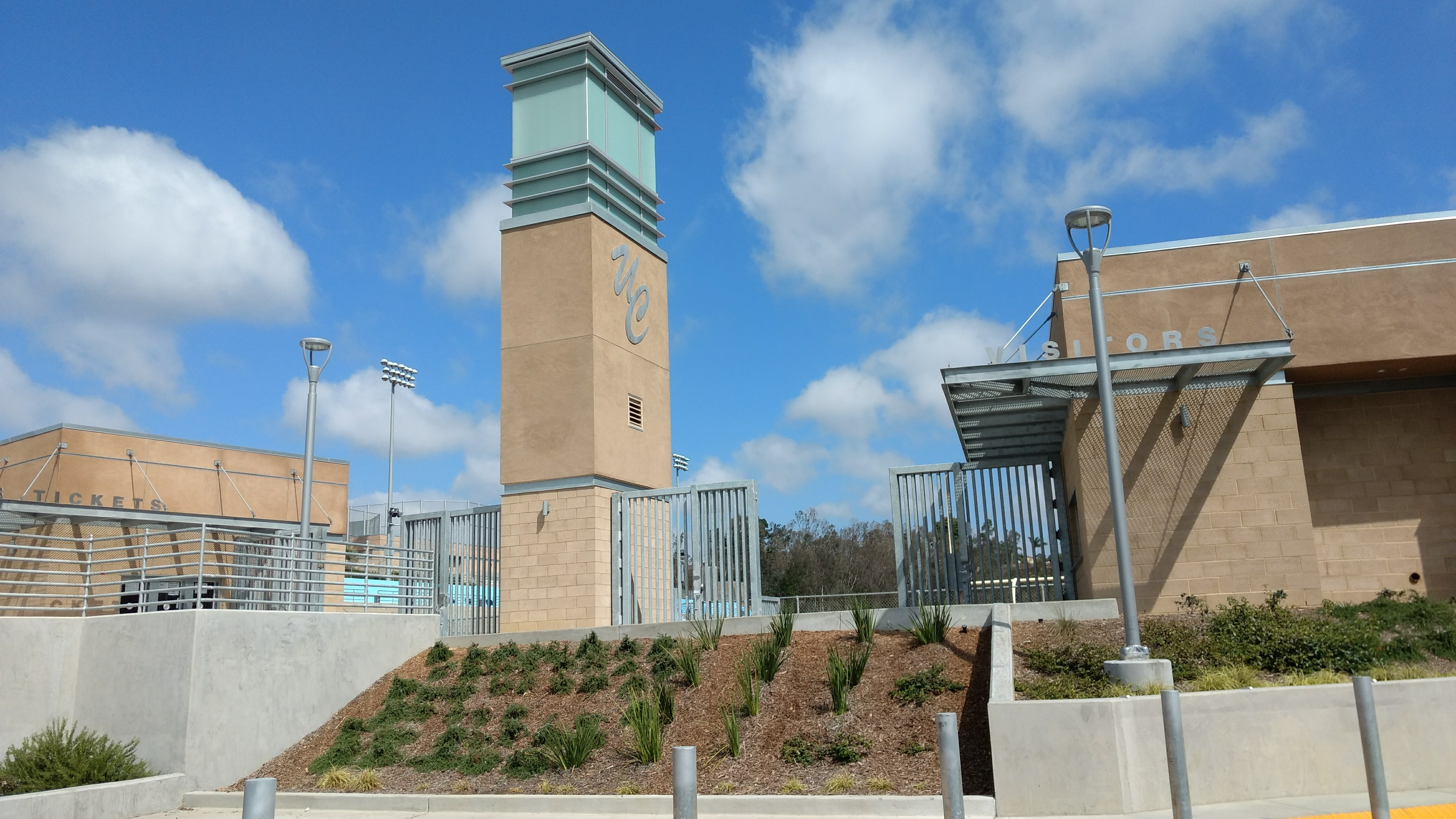
- Stadium entrance

Location
- 6949 Genesee Avenue; San Diego, California 92122; United States; 32°51′38.80″N 117°12′13.22″W

Information
- Type: Public
- Motto: Carpe diem (Seize the day)
- Established: 1981
- School district: San Diego Unified School District
- Principal: Michael Paredes
- Grades: 9–12
- Gender: Coeducational
- Enrollment: 1,505 (2023–2024)
- Colors: Columbia blue, navy and white
- Athletics conference: CIF San Diego Section; City League
- Team name: Centurions
- Website: uchs.sandiegounified.org

University City High School (UCHS) is a comprehensive four-year public high school in the University City section of San Diego, California, United States. It is part of San Diego Unified School District. The school opened its doors in September 1981. It was ranked 222nd in 2008 and 297th in 2009 on Newsweek's list of Best U.S. Public High Schools. In 2013, The Washington Post ranked UCHS as the 602nd most challenging high school in America.

== Academic assessment ==
UCHS offers a wide range of instructional programs. The Advanced Placement Program, Gifted and Talented Education (GATE) Program, the seminar program, and the special education program address the needs of identified students. UCHS students have the opportunity to take visual and performing arts courses and practical arts courses.

The school offers 15 AP classes: Biology, Chemistry, Environmental Science, Physics C, Statistics, US Government, US History, World History, English Language and Composition, English Literature and Composition, Art History, Studio Art, Psychology, Computer science, and Spanish Language. The school also participates in the Accelerated College Program with San Diego Mesa College to offer Calculus, Linear Algebra, Discrete Mathematics, and Political Science. These classes are taught by Mesa College professors on the University City High School campus. The school also provides some performance programs, such as breakdancing and freestyle dance.

== Sports ==
University City High School offers sports programs for student-athletes.

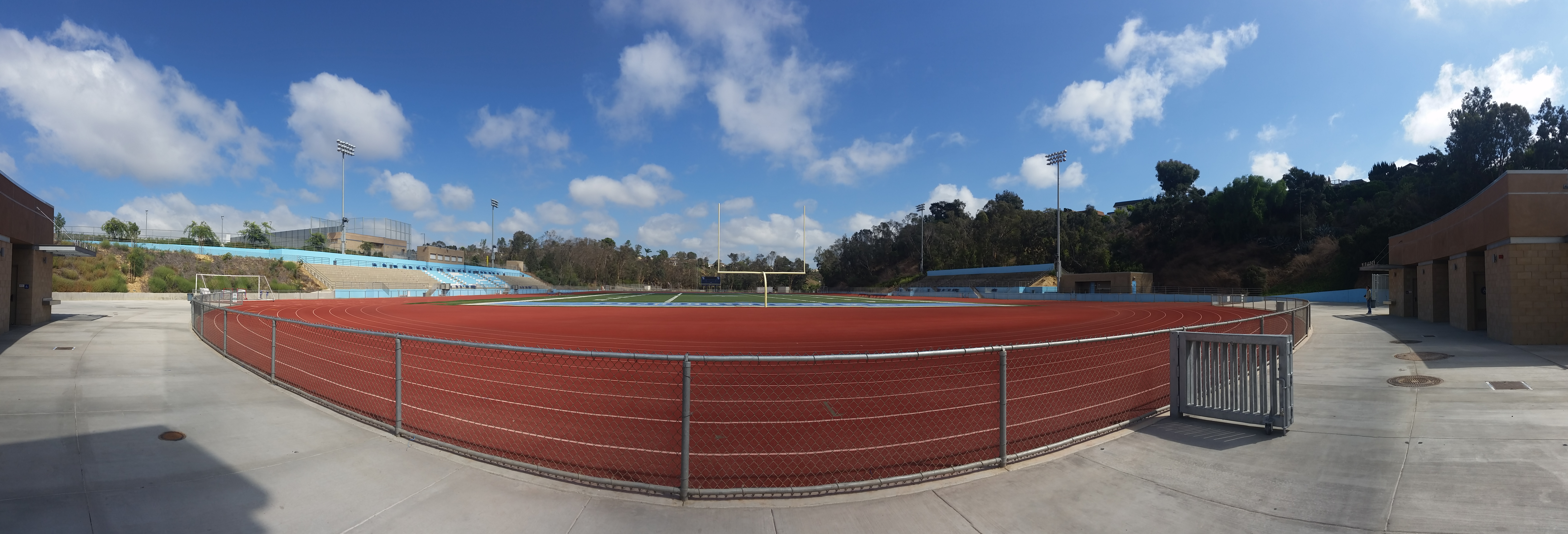
University City High School stadium

=== Fall sports ===
- Boys' and girls' cross country
- Field hockey
- Football
- Girls' tennis
- Girls' volleyball
- Boys' water polo
- Color guard
- Marching band
- Boys’ beach volleyball
- Girls’ golf

=== Winter sports ===
- Boys' and girls' basketball
- Boys' and girls' soccer
- Wrestling
- Girls' water polo

=== Spring sports ===
- Badminton
- Baseball
- Golf
- Lacrosse
- Softball
- Swimming
- Boys' tennis
- Track and field
- Boys' volleyball
- Color guard
- Girls’ beach volleyball

== Logos and school colors ==
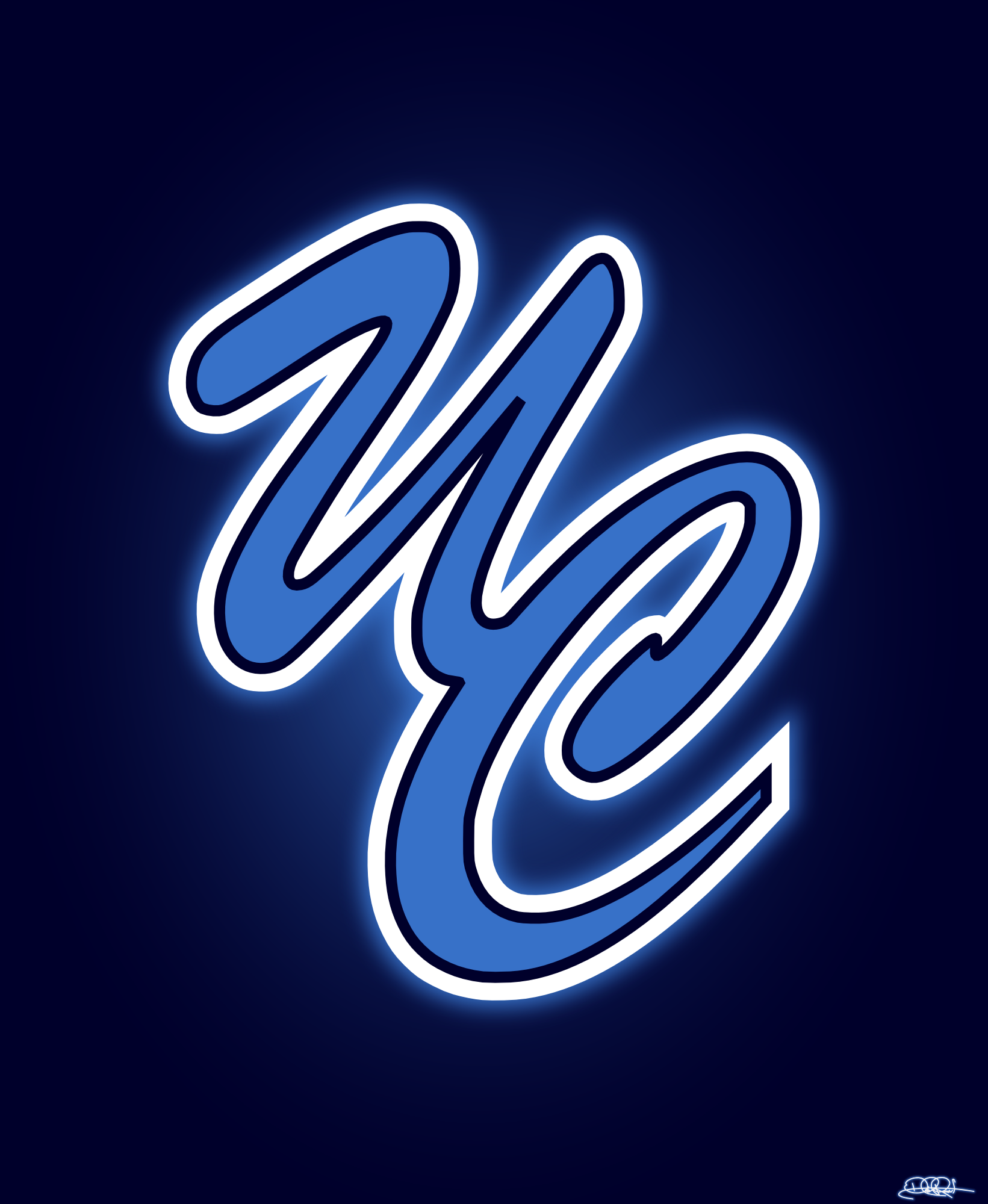
UCHS script logo

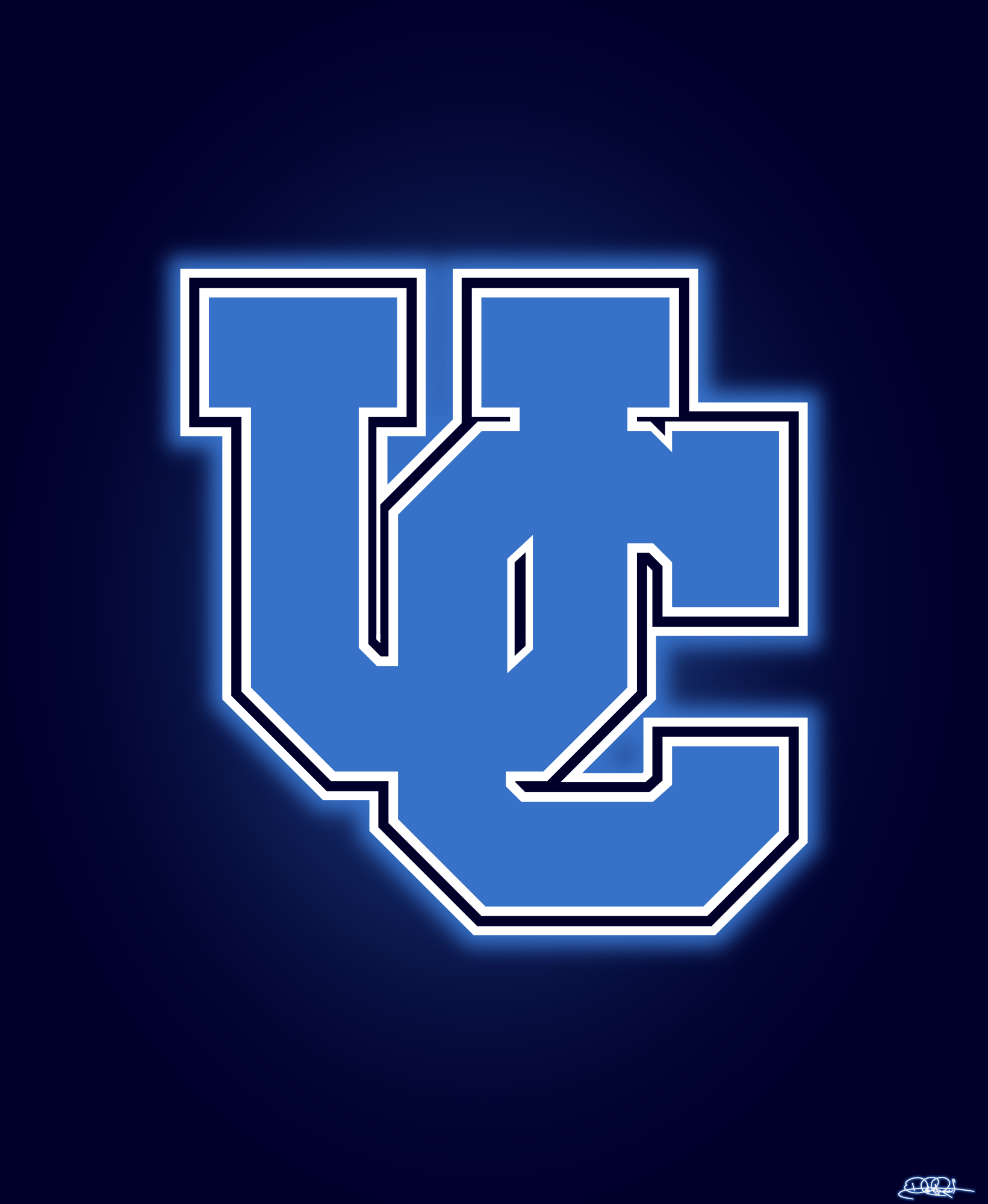
UCHS block logo

The color palette of the school, as well as their three primary logos, the UC Script, the Centurion, and the UC block logo, are given below. The block logo is used as the "varsity letter" style for all varsity letter-earning athletes.

=== Marine Corps JROTC ===
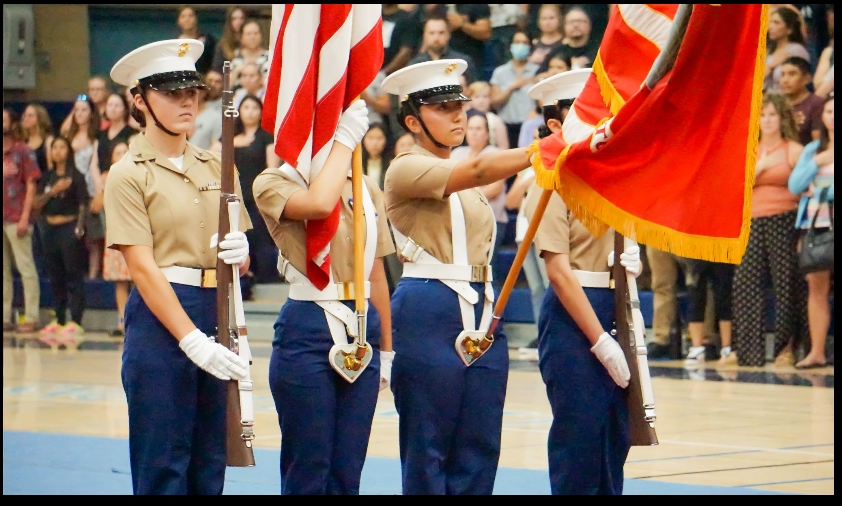
USMC JROTC Color Guard presenting for the national anthem at a pep rally

University City High School hosts a Marine Corps Junior Reserve Officers' Training Corps (MCJROTC) unit. The program is part of the Junior Reserve Officers' Training Corps programs operating within the San Diego Unified School District. The MCJROTC program focuses on leadership development, citizenship, physical fitness, and community service.

Cadets participate in a variety of extracurricular teams and activities including drill team, color guard, Raddiers, and academic competitions. The unit also participates in community service events and regional drill competitions throughout the San Diego area.

This is the only Marine Corps JROTC unit within the San Diego Unified School District.

== Notable alumni ==
- Yari Allnutt – 2-time Olympic soccer player
- Rhett Bernstein – soccer player
- Matt Brock – professional football player in the National Football League
- Mac Fleet – professional track & field athlete, 2-time NCAA track and field National Champion in the 1500m for the University of Oregon
- Jennifer Gross – college basketball coach
- Kyle Holder – Major League Baseball shortstop
- Kent Ninomiya – TV news anchor, reporter and executive
- Tim Patrick – NFL wide receiver for the Detroit Lions
- Mike Saipe – Major League Baseball pitcher
- Tyler Saladino – Major League Baseball infielder
- Félix Sánchez – two-time Olympic gold medalist in the 400 meter hurdles, representing the Dominican Republic
- Stuart Schuffman – travel writer and creator of Broke Ass Stuart's Guide to Living Cheaply in San Francisco
- Ashley Nell Tipton – Project Runway contestant
- Ken Waldichuk – Major League Baseball pitcher
- Brandon Zambrano – soccer player
