= Jeshua Anderson =

American sprinter and hurdler (born 1989)

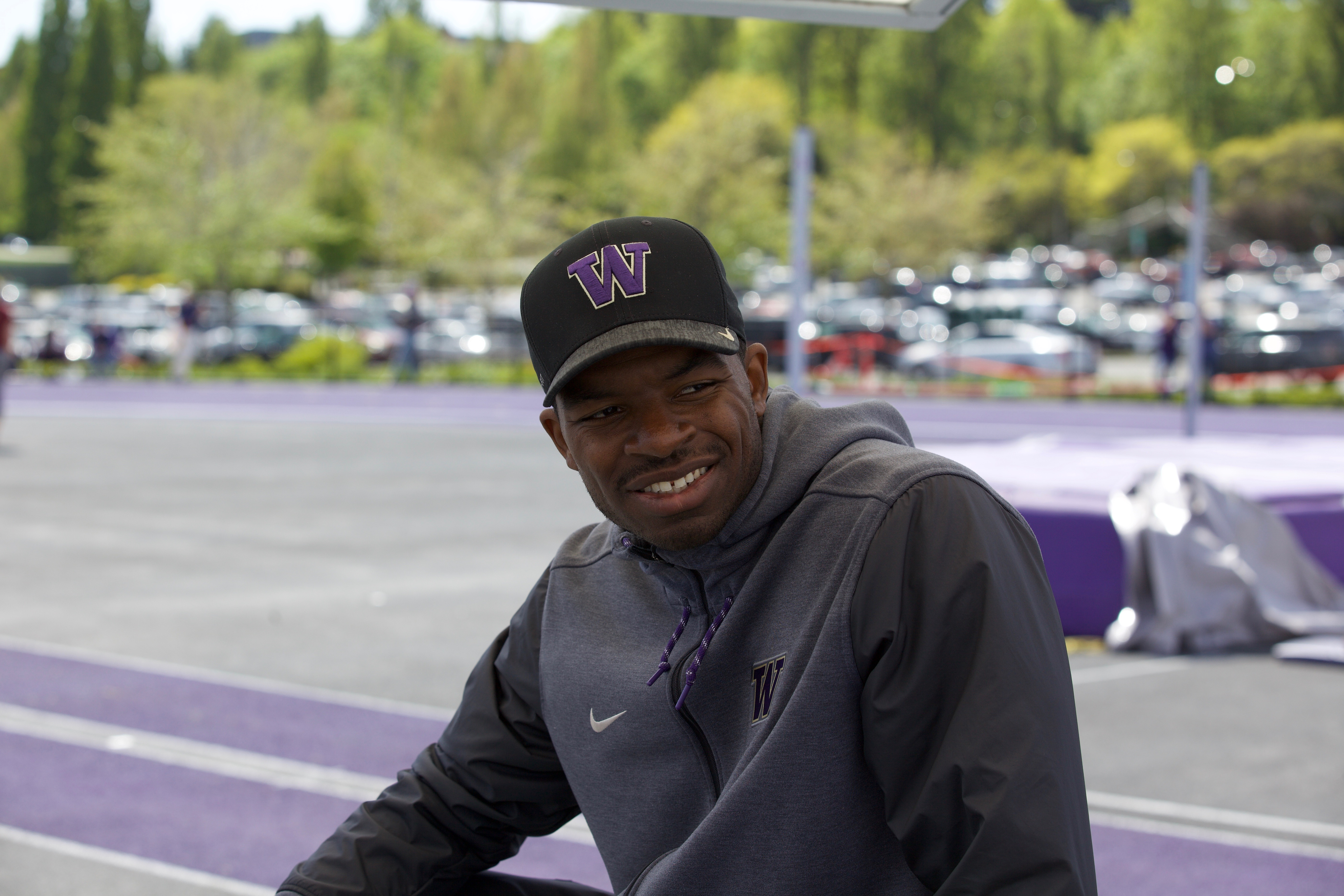
- Anderson in 2019

Personal information
- Nationality: American
- Born: June 22, 1989 (age 37) Woodland Hills, California, U.S.
- Education: Washington State University
- Height: 6 ft 2 in (1.88 m)
- Weight: 190 lb (86 kg)

Sport
- Sport: Sprinting
- Events: 400 metres, 400 metres hurdles

Achievements and titles
- Personal bests: 400 m: 46.08 s (Seattle 2009); 400 m hurdles: 47.93 s (Eugene 2011)
Medal record
Men's athletics
Representing the United States
Pan American Games
Bronze medal – third place	2015 Toronto	4×400 m relay
Summer Universiade
Gold medal – first place	2011 Shenzhen	400 m hurdles
World Junior Championships
Gold medal – first place	2008 Bydgoszcz	400 m hurdles
Gold medal – first place	2008 Bydgoszcz	4×400 m relay

Jeshua Anderson (born June 22, 1989) is an American retired sprinter, who specializes in the 400 meter hurdles. He is a 3 time NCAA champion in the 400m hurdles and was the second freshman from Washington State University to ever win the NCAA title. In 2008 Anderson was 400 meter hurdles Junior World Champion and holds the second fastest high school time recorded in the 300m hurdles. He was born and raised in Woodland Hills, California and attended Taft High School. After winning the 2011 Outdoor Championships, Anderson had the competed for team USA at the world championships. He also participated in the 2016 Olympic trials in which he finished as a finalist.

After college, Anderson pursued a professional career as a sponsored athlete of Nike and sought to qualify for the 2012 Olympic games in London but suffered a torn hamstring that limited his performance.

Jeshua has now stepped down from his career as a competitor to pursue coaching at the University of Washington and focuses on the sprints and hurdle events. Coaching alongside his own college hurdle coach, Mark McDonald, Anderson now is going into his fourth year with the Huskies. At the start of his coaching position at UW, Jeshua led 2 of his athletes to break school records and receive All-American honors.

== Track and Field Career ==
=== 2007 ===
At the 2007 CIF State Track and Field Championships, he set the National High School Record in the 300 m hurdles in 35.28 seconds, breaking the previous record mark of 35.32 established by George Porter in 1985. Two years later, at the same meet, Reggie Wyatt, runner up in Anderson's record race, improved upon the record by running 35.02.

=== 2008 ===
At the 2008 World Junior Championships in Athletics in Bydgoszcz, Poland, Anderson won a gold medal in the 400 meter hurdles and 4x400 meter relay. At the latter qualifying race in Ohio, Anderson set a new stadium record at the Jesse Owens Memorial stadium with a time of 49.28 that was in place since 2003.

Anderson also won the 400m hurdle NCAA title that year with a time of 48.69, becoming only the second WSU freshman to win an NCAA title as freshman.

Jeshua was also the champion of the Pac-10 400m Hurdle Champion with a time of 49.55

=== 2009 ===
Anderson becomes the 2009 NCAA 400m hurdle champion with a time of 48.47 as well as the Pac-10 400m champion (48.90).

=== 2010 ===
2010 NCAA 400m Hurdle Runner-up and Pac-10 Champion (48.63).

=== 2011 ===
Jeshua won the 400m hurdles during the 2011 Pac-10 championships with a Pac-10 Meet Record 48.13 in May 2011, and was awarded the Pac-10 Men's Track Athlete of the Year. He followed that up by winning his third NCAA Men's Outdoor Track and Field Championships with a time of 48.56. He then won the USA Outdoor Track and Field Championships, qualifying him to run in the IAAF World Championships in Athletics where he placed 12th in the 2011 World Championships in Athletics – Men's 400 metres hurdles. After becoming a finalist for the Bowerman Award, he went on to run at the 2011 World University Games in Shenzhen, China winning a gold medal in the 400m hurdles.

=== 2012 ===
In April of that year just before the 2012 London Olympics, at the Mt. Sac Relays, Jeshua pulled his hamstring during his race in the 400m Hurdles. After an extensive effort to recover from the injury he was not able to qualify for the Olympic Team that year.

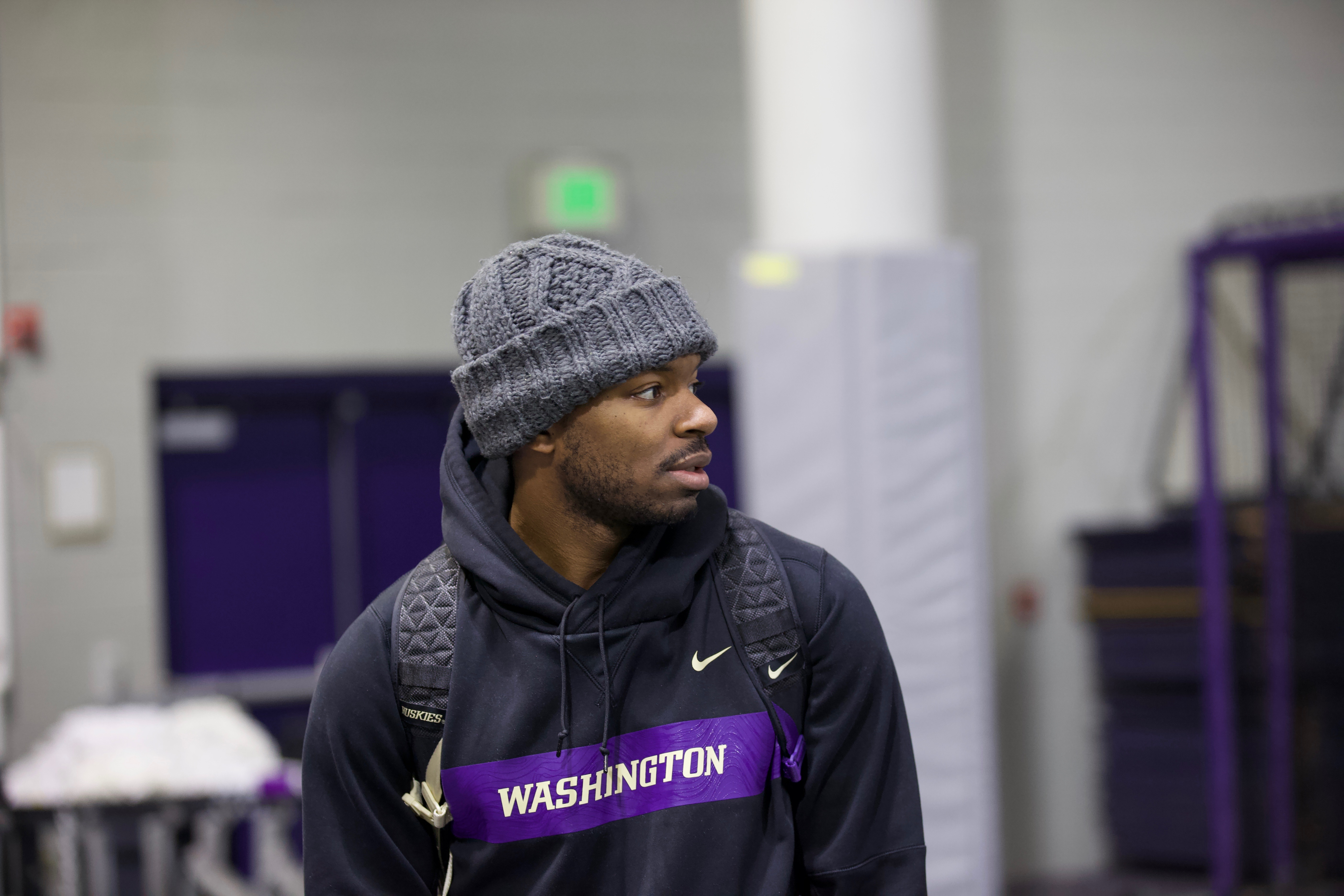
Jeshua Anderson Coaching in the Dempsey Indoor Track

=== 2015 ===
Anderson finished 5th in the 400 hurdles in a time of 49.22 at the 2015 USA Outdoor Track and Field Championships, earned a bronze medal in the Athletics at the 2015 Pan American Games – Men's 4 × 400 metres relay and ran a season best 48.95 in Athletics at the 2015 Pan American Games – Men's 400 metres hurdles.

=== 2016 ===
Still dealing with the hamstring injury that occurred in 2012, Jeshua finished as a finalist in the 2016 Olympic Trials.

== Football career ==
In his freshman and sophomore years at Washington State, Anderson also played wide receiver for the Washington State Cougars football team. As a freshman, he caught 12 passes for 372 yards and two touchdowns. In his sophomore year, he had 33 receptions for 305 yards and two touchdowns. By his junior year, however, Anderson left the football team to focus on his track career.

Anderson had also played football during his prep career at W. H. Taft High School, and was rated a three-star prospect by Rivals.com. He had 40 receptions for 1013 yards and 10 touchdowns.

== Personal best ==
Distance	Time	Venue
400 m	46.08 s	Seattle, United States (May 2, 2009)
400 m hurdles	47.93 s	Eugene, United States (June 26, 2011)
