= 2007 World Youth Championships in Athletics =

- Host city: Ostrava, Czech Republic
- Events: 40
- Dates: 11–15 July
- Main venue: Městský stadion

The 2007 World Youth Championships in Athletics were the fifth edition of the IAAF World Youth Championships in Athletics. They were held on 11–15 July 2007 in Ostrava, Czech Republic.

== Results ==
=== Boys ===
Event	Gold		Silver		Bronze	
100 m	Dexter Lee; Jamaica	10.51	Nickel Ashmeade; Jamaica	10.54	Kenneth Gilstrap; United States	10.65
200 m	Ramone McKenzie; Jamaica	20.67	Ramil Guliyev; Azerbaijan	20.72	Nickel Ashmeade; Jamaica	20.76 PB
400 m	Christopher Clarke; United Kingdom	46.74	Kirani James; Grenada	46.96 PB	Vladimir Krasnov; Russia	47.03
800 m	Geoffrey Kibet; Kenya	1:49.99	Ali Al-Deraan; Saudi Arabia	1:50.10	Amine El Manaoui; Morocco	1:50.12 PB
1500 m	Fredrick Ndunge Musyoki; Kenya	3:44.27 PB	Josphat Kithii Mitunga; Kenya	3:44.68	Dawit Wolde; Ethiopia	3:45.03 PB
3000 m	Daniel Salel Lemashon; Kenya	7:57.18 PB	Lucas Rotich; Kenya	7:59.67 PB	Hicham El Amrani; Morocco	8:00.98 PB
2000 m st.	Legese Lamiso; Ethiopia	5:30.81 WYL	Silas Kitum Kosgei; Kenya	5:32.88 PB	Abdellah Dacha; Morocco	5:34.49 PB
110 m H 91.4 cm	Wayne Davis; United States	13.18 WYR	William Wynne; United States	13.44 PB	Denis Semyonov; Kazakhstan	13.82 PB
400 m H 84.0 cm	William Wynne; United States	49.01 WYR	Reginald Wyatt; United States	50.33 PB	Amaurys R. Valle; Cuba	50.37 PB
10,000 m track walk	Stanislav Emelyanov; Russia	41:49.91 CR	Daniel Pedro Gomez; Mexico	43:11.87 PB	Vito Di Bari; Italy	43:36.13 PB
Medley relay	United States; Isaiah Sweeney; Kenneth Gilstrap; William Wynne; Danzell Fortson	1:51.34 WYL	Japan; Seiya Hane; Daizo Hamano; Hiroyuki Kubota; Akihiro Urano	1:51.42 PB	Jamaica; Dexter Lee; Ramone McKenzie; Nickel Ashmeade; Dwayne Extol	1:52.18 PB
High jump	Wang Chen; China	2.22 WYL	Sergey Mudrov; Russia	2.22 WYL	Josh Hall; Australia	2.20 PB
Pole vault	Nico Weiler; Germany	5.26 CR	Manuel Concepción; Spain; Shota Doi; Japan	4.85	no Bronze Medal	
Long jump	Yasumichi Konishi; Japan	7.52	Daisuke Yoshiyama; Japan	7.32	Christian Taylor; United States	7.29 PB
Triple jump	Christian Taylor; United States	15.98 WYL	Aleksey Fyodorov; Russia	15.59 PB	Gennadiy Chudinov; Russia	15.54 PB
Shot put 5 kg	David Storl; Germany	21.40 WYL	Marin Premeru; Croatia	20.42	Dmytro Savytskyy; Ukraine	20.15
Discus 1.500 kg	Mykyta Nesterenko; Ukraine	68.54	Marin Premeru; Croatia	64.20 PB	Andrius Gudžius; Lithuania	61.59 PB
Hammer 5 kg	Andriy Martynyuk; Ukraine	76.09	Daniel Szabo; Hungary	75.30 PB	Richard Olbrich; Germany	75.18
Javelin 700 g	Tuomas Laaksonen; Finland	79.71 WYL	Hamish Peacock; Australia	76.31 PB	Edgars Rūtiņš; Latvia	74.65 PB
Octathlon	Shane Brathwaite; Barbados	6261 WYL	Jaroslav Hedvičák; Czech Republic	6212 PB	Adam Bevis; Australia	6212 PB
WR world record | AR area record | CR championship record | GR games record | NR national record | OR Olympic record | PB personal best | SB season best | WL world leading (in a given season)

=== Girls ===
Event	Gold		Silver		Bronze	
100 m	Asha Philip; United Kingdom	11.46	Rosângela Santos; Brazil	11.46 PB	Ashleigh Nelson; United Kingdom	11.58
200 m	Barbara Leoncio; Brazil	23.50 PB	Chalonda Goodman; United States	23.54	Nivea Smith; Bahamas	23.69
400 m	Yuliya Baraley; Ukraine	53.57	Latoya McDermott; Jamaica	54.12	Alexandra Štuková; Slovakia	54.46
800 m	Elena Mirela Lavric; Romania	2:04.29	Alison Leonard; United Kingdom	2:05.36	Juana Ivis Mendez; Cuba	2:05.42 PB
1500 m	Sammary Cherotich; Kenya	4:15.47 PB	Jordan Hasay; United States	4:17.24	Sheila Chepkirui Kiprotich; Kenya	4:19.26 SB
3000 m	Mercy Cherono; Kenya	8:53.94 CR	Mahlet Melese; Ethiopia	8:56.98 PB	Sule Utura; Ethiopia	9:06.48 PB
100 m H 76.2 cm	Julian Purvis; United States	13.41 PB	Shermaine Williams; Jamaica	13.48	Anne Zagre; Belgium	13.58 PB
400 m H	Dalilah Muhammad; United States	57.25	Andreea Ionescu; Romania	57.33 PB	Ryann Krais; United States	57.50
2000 m st.	Caroline Tuigong; Kenya	6:22.30 CR	Christine Mayanga; Kenya	6:22.49 PB	Karoline Bjerkeli Grøvdal; Norway	6:25.30 SB
5000 m track walk	Tatyana Kalmykova; Russia	20:28.05 WYR	Irina Yumanova; Russia	21:21.14 PB	Panayiota Tsinopoulou; Greece	22:49.15 PB
Medley relay	United States; Chalonda Goodman; Ashton Purvis; Ryann Krais; Erica Alexander	2:05.74 WYL	Jamaica; Gayon Evans; Jura Levy; Shana-Gaye Tracey; Latoya McDermott	2:06.77 PB	Canada; Loudia Laarman; Christabel Nettey; Alyssa Johnson; Natalie Geiger	2:09.08 SB
High jump	Natalya Mamlina; Russia	1.89 WYL	Misha-Gaye DaCosta; Jamaica	1.84 PB	Aleksandrina Klimentinova; Bulgaria; Elena Vallortigara; Italy	1.81
Pole vault	Vicky Parnov; Australia	4.35 CR	Ekaterini Stefanidi; Greece	4.25 SB	Petra Olsen; Sweden	4.05
Long jump	Darya Klishina; Russia	6.47 CR	Ivana Španović; Serbia	6.41 SB	Mariya Shumilova; Russia	6.29
Triple jump	Dailenis Alcantara; Cuba	13.63	Yosleidis Rivalta; Cuba	13.32 SB	Maja Bratkic; Slovenia	12.96
Shot put	Aliona Hryshko; Belarus	15.91 PB	Samira Burkhardt; Germany	15.36	Sophie Kleeberg; Germany	14.94 PB
Discus	Julia Fischer; Germany	51.39 PB	Sandra Perković; Croatia	51.25	Jin Yuanyan; China	51.20
Hammer	Bianca Perie; Romania	64.61 CR	Andriana Papadopoulou-Fatala; Greece	56.32	Barbara Špiler; Slovenia	55.97
Javelin	Tazmin Brits; South Africa	51.71	Carita Hinkka; Finland	51.61	Sini Kiiski; Finland	50.75 SB
Heptathlon	Kateřina Cachová; Czech Republic	5641 WYL	Carolin Schäfer; Germany	5544 PB	Elisa-Sophie Dobel; Germany	5494 PB
WR world record | AR area record | CR championship record | GR games record | NR national record | OR Olympic record | PB personal best | SB season best | WL world leading (in a given season)

== Medals table ==
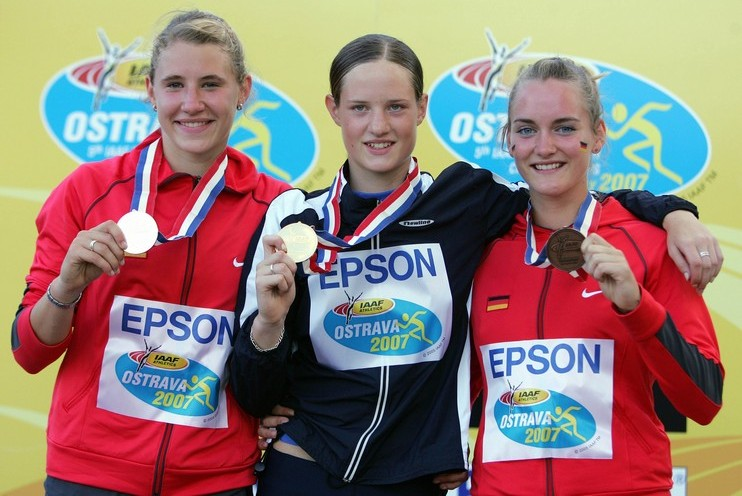
The heptathlon podium, left to right: Carolin Schäfer (GER), Kateřina Cachová (CZE), Elisa-Sophie Dobel (GER).

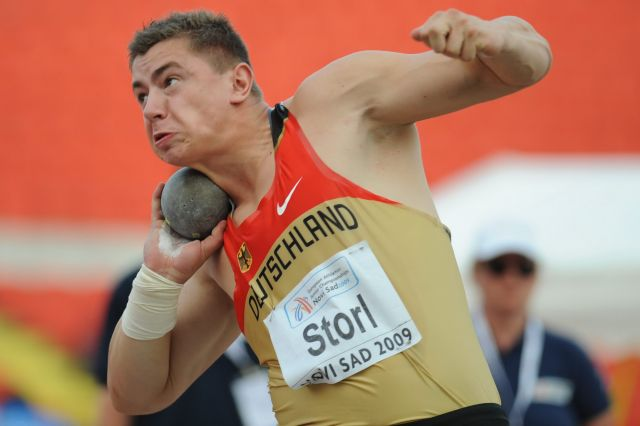
David Storl won the shot put gold for Germany.

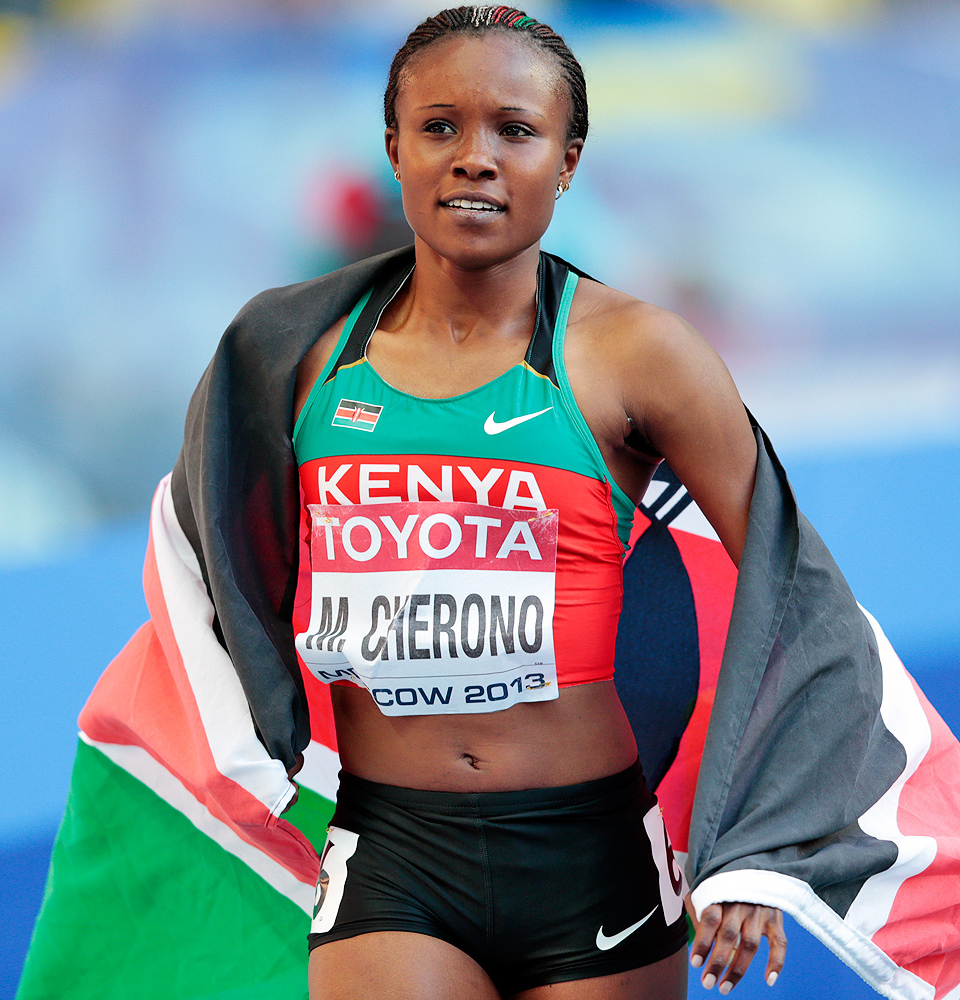
Mercy Cherono of Kenya won the 3000 metres title.

Rank	Nation	Gold	Silver	Bronze	Total
1	United States (USA)	7	4	3	14
2	Kenya (KEN)	6	4	1	11
3	Russia (RUS)	4	3	3	10
4	Germany (GER)	3	2	3	8
5	Ukraine (UKR)	3	0	1	4
6	Jamaica (JAM)	2	5	2	9
7	Great Britain (GBR)	2	1	1	4
8	Romania (ROU)	2	1	0	3
9	Japan (JPN)	1	3	0	4
10	Australia (AUS)	1	1	2	4
10	Cuba (CUB)	1	1	2	4
10	Ethiopia (ETH)	1	1	2	4
13	Finland (FIN)	1	1	1	3
14	Brazil (BRA)	1	1	0	2
14	Czech Republic (CZE)	1	1	0	2
16	China (CHN)	1	0	1	2
17	Barbados (BAR)	1	0	0	1
17	Belarus (BLR)	1	0	0	1
17	South Africa (RSA)	1	0	0	1
20	Croatia (CRO)	0	3	0	3
21	Greece (GRE)	0	2	1	3
22	Azerbaijan (AZE)	0	1	0	1
22	Grenada (GRN)	0	1	0	1
22	Hungary (HUN)	0	1	0	1
22	Mexico (MEX)	0	1	0	1
22	Saudi Arabia (KSA)	0	1	0	1
22	Serbia (SRB)	0	1	0	1
22	Spain (ESP)	0	1	0	1
29	Morocco (MAR)	0	0	3	3
30	Italy (ITA)	0	0	2	2
30	Slovenia (SLO)	0	0	2	2
32	Bahamas (BAH)	0	0	1	1
32	Belgium (BEL)	0	0	1	1
32	Bulgaria (BUL)	0	0	1	1
32	Canada (CAN)	0	0	1	1
32	Kazakhstan (KAZ)	0	0	1	1
32	Latvia (LAT)	0	0	1	1
32	Lithuania (LTU)	0	0	1	1
32	Norway (NOR)	0	0	1	1
32	Slovakia (SVK)	0	0	1	1
32	Sweden (SWE)	0	0	1	1
Totals (41 entries)		40	41	40	121

== See also ==
- 2007 in athletics (track and field)
