= Wayne Davis (hurdler) =

American athlete (born 1991)

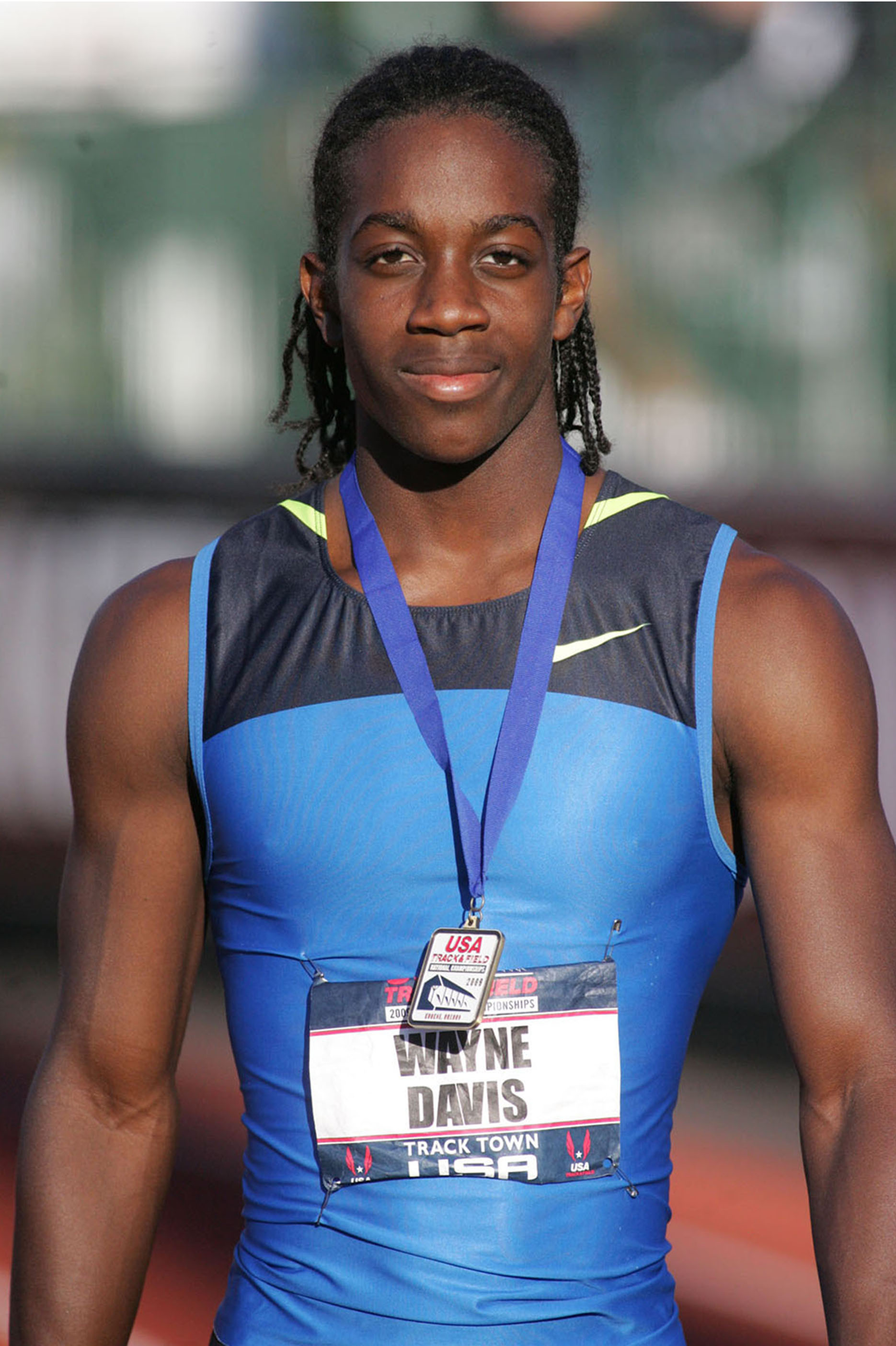

Personal information
- Born: August 22, 1991 (age 34) Raleigh, North Carolina, U.S.
- Height: 5 ft 10 in (1.78 m)
- Weight: 178 lb (81 kg)

Sport
- Sport: Running
- Event: Hurdles
- College team: Texas A&M Aggies

Achievements and titles
- Personal best: 110 mH: 13.08 s (Port-of-Spain 2009)
Medal record
Men's athletics
Representing Trinidad and Tobago
CAC Championships
Silver medal – second place	2013 Morelia	110 m hurdles
Representing the United States
Pan American Junior Championships
Gold medal – first place	2009 Port-of-Spain	110 m hurdles
World Youth Championships
Gold medal – first place	2007 Ostrava	110 m hurdles

Wayne Courtney Davis II (born August 22, 1991) is an American athlete, now representing Trinidad and Tobago, who specializes in the 110 metre hurdles. He currently holds the world youth record, world junior record and the US high school record in the 39" 110 m hurdles with a time of 13.08 seconds. He is a graduate of Southeast Raleigh Magnet High School in Raleigh, North Carolina.

== Career ==
Davis broke the World Youth 110 hurdles record (36") on July 12, 2007, at the 2007 World Youth Championships in Athletics in Ostrava, Czech Republic. Two years later, on July 31, 2009, he broke the World Junior 110 m hurdles record (39") at the 2009 Pan American Junior Athletics Championships in Port-of-Spain, Trinidad beating the previous mark of 13.12 seconds set by 2004 Olympic gold medalist Liu Xiang in 2002. He competed at the 2014 Commonwealth Games.

== Eligibility ==
Davis' parents are both natives of Trinidad and Tobago. On August 4, 2011, Davis officially transferred his eligibility to compete for Trinidad and Tobago. His sister Dannielle also competes internationally for Trinidad and Tobago. As a member of the Trinidad and Tobago 2012 Olympic Team he finished sixth in his semi-final of the 110 metres hurdles.

Records
Preceded by (Poland) Artur Noga	Men's World Junior Record Holder, 110 metres hurdles 31 July 2009 – 24 July 2014	Succeeded by (France) Wilhem Belocian
Preceded by (Greece) Konstadinos Douvalidis	Boys' World Youth Best Holder, 110 metres hurdles 12 July 2007 – 21 July 2012	Succeeded by (France) Wilhem Belocian
