= 2009 Pan American Junior Athletics Championships =

XV Pan American Junior Athletics Championships
- Dates: 31 July - 2 August
- Host city: Port of Spain, Trinidad and Tobago
- Venue: Hasely Crawford Stadium
- Level: Junior
- Events: 44
- Participation: about 397 athletes from 32 nations

The 2009 Pan American Junior Championships were held in Port of Spain, Trinidad and Tobago at the Hasely Crawford Stadium on July 31 to August 2, 2009. A report on the results was given.

== Participation (unofficial) ==
Detailed result lists can be found. An unofficial count yields the number of about 397 athletes from about 32 countries: Argentina (10), Aruba (1), Bahamas (13), Barbados (5), Bermuda (8), Bolivia (1), Brazil (34), British Virgin Islands (6), Canada (51), Chile (11), Colombia (9), Costa Rica (10), Cuba (6), Dominican Republic (12), El Salvador (3), Grenada (5), Guyana (6), Jamaica (27), Mexico (23), Netherlands Antilles (3), Panama (2), Paraguay (1), Peru (1), Puerto Rico (9), Saint Kitts and Nevis (9), Saint Lucia (3), Saint Vincent and the Grenadines (2), Suriname (1), Trinidad and Tobago (32), Turks and Caicos (2), United States (82), Venezuela (9).

== Medal summary ==
Complete results can be found Complete results can be found on the Athletics Canada website, on the C.F.P.I. Timing website, on the USA Track & Field website, on the Tilastopaja website, and on the "World Junior Athletics History" website.

=== Men ===
Event	Gold		Silver		Bronze	
100 m (Wind: 0.7 m/s)	Marcus Rowland (USA)	10.03 PB WJL CR	D'Angelo Cherry (USA)	10.17	Diego Cavalcanti (BRA)	10.30 PB
200 m (Wind: 1.4 m/s)	Nickel Ashmeade (JAM)	20.40 PB	Keyth Talley (USA)	20.78 PB	Ramone McKenzie (JAM)	20.79
400 m	Kirani James (GRN)	45.43	Tavaris Tate (USA)	45.50	Rondell Bartholomew (GRN)	46.61
800 m	Raidel Acea (CUB)	1:48.09	Gavyn Nero (TRI)	1:48.90	Joseph Abbot (USA)	1:48.99
1500 m	Mac Fleet (USA)	3:48.04	Jeremy Rae (CAN)	3:48.29	Iván López (CHI)	3:48.45
5000 m	Mohammed Ahmed (CAN)	14:12.11 PB	Sean Keveren (USA)	14:14.46	Colby Lowe (USA)	14:14.57
10,000 m	Victor Aravena (CHI)	31:01.70	Ederson Pereira (BRA)	31:20.38	Parker Stinson (USA)	31:48.35
110 m hurdles (Wind: 2.0 m/s)	Wayne Davis (USA)	13.08 WJR, CR	Booker Nunley (USA)	13.32	Shane Brathwaite (BAR)	13.41
400 m hurdles	William Wynne (USA)	49.31 PB	Jehue Gordon (TRI)	50.08	Reggie Wyatt (USA)	50.61
3000 m steeplechase	Mattias Wolter (CAN)	9:05.28	Sean Soderman (USA)	9:10.75	Derlis Ra Ayala Sanchez (PAR)	9:14.77
4×100 m relay	United States (USA); Keyth Talley; D'Angelo Cherry; Trevante Rhodes; Marcus Rowland	39.06 WJL	Brazil (BRA); Gustavo dos Santos; Eric de Jesús; Diego Cavalcanti; Jefferson Liberato Lucindo	39.64 =NJR	Jamaica (JAM); Deuce Carter; Ramone McKenzie; Nickel Ashmeade; Dexter Lee	40.06
4×400 m relay	United States (USA); Clayton Parros; Duane Walker; Joey Hughes; Tavaris Tate	3:03.25 WJL	Trinidad and Tobago (TRI); Jevon Matthew; Deon Lendore; Kevin Haynes; Jehue Gordon	3:07.70 SB	Canada (CAN); Michael Trnkus; Gabriel El Hanbli; Andre Hamilton; Rohan Stewart	3:09.05 NJR
10,000 m race walk	Pedro Daniel Gómez (MEX)	42:19.56	Caio Bonfim (BRA)	42:43.58	Giovanni Torres (MEX)	42:46.89
High jump	Derek Drouin (CAN)	2.27 m PB	Erik Kynard (USA); Edgar Alejandro Rivera (MEX)	2.10 m		
Pole vault	Jack Whitt (USA)	5.20 m	Michael Arnold (USA)	5.10 m	K'Don Samuels (JAM)	4.85 m
Long jump	Jhamal Bowen (PAN)	7.89m (1.3 m/s)	Marquise Goodwin (USA)	7.85m (1.2 m/s)	Lourival Almeida Neto (BRA)	7.66 m (0.9 m/s)
Triple jump	Will Claye (USA)	16.57 m (0.7 m/s)	Jean Rosa (BRA)	16.03 m (1.9 m/s)	Albert Johnson (USA)	15.89 m (2.1 m/s)
Shot put	Mason Finley (USA)	20.36 m PB	Jordan Clarke (USA)	19.97 m	Tim Nedow (CAN)	19.00 m
Discus throw	Mason Finley (USA)	65.34 m PB	Quincy Wilson (TRI)	57.90 m	Travis Smikle (JAM)	57.18 m
Hammer throw	Reinier Mejías Cabrera (CUB)	78.38 m PB	Jean Rosario (PUR)	71.70 m	Justin Welch (USA)	68.22 m
Javelin throw	Braian Toledo (ARG)	69.84 m	Sam Crouser (USA)	67.90 m	Matthew Byers (USA)	65.83 m
Decathlon	Curtis Beach (USA)	7377	Gray Horn (USA)	6982	Taylor Corney (CAN)	6764

=== Women ===
Event	Gold		Silver		Bronze	
100 m (Wind: 0.8 m/s)	Chalonda Goodman (USA)	11.22 CR, PB	Amber Purvis (USA)	11.38	Jura Levy (JAM)	11.51
200 m (Wind: 1.3 m/s)	Chalonda Goodman (USA)	23.08	Tasha Allen (USA)	23.51	Jura Levy (JAM)	23.93
400 m	Jennifer Padilla (COL)	53.60	Alejandra Cherizola (MEX)	53.81	Jodi-Ann Muir (JAM)	53.93
800 m	Rose Mary Almanza Blanco (CUB)	2:03.83	Chanelle Price (USA)	2:05.13	Helen Crofts (CAN)	2:05.19
1500 m	Jordan Hasay (USA)	4:26.26	Laura Esther Galván (MEX)	4:30.72	Taylor Wallace (USA)	4:31.76
3000 m	Laura Esther Galván (MEX)	10:02.32	Julieta Bautista (MEX)	10:02.66	Elizabeth Hynes (USA)	10:04.92
5000 m	Sarah Andrews (USA)	16:42.38	Aisling Cuffe (USA)	16:47.45	Julieta Bautista (MEX)	17:04.91
100 m hurdles (Wind: 2.2 m/s)	Shermaine Williams (JAM)	13.22	Rosemarie Carty (JAM)	13.34	Raven Clay (USA)	13.44
400 meter hurdles	Nikita Tracey (JAM)	57.82	Dalilah Muhammad (USA)	58.42	Danielle Dowie (JAM)	58.92
3000 m steeplechase	Yoslin Ocampo Bueno (CUB)	10:32.38	Florencia Borelli (ARG)	10:40.46	Jessica Furlan (CAN)	10:56.22
4×100 m relay	United States (USA); Jessica Davis; Amber Purvis; Tasha Allen; Chalonda Goodman	44.09	Jamaica (JAM); Audrea Segree; Antonique Campbell; Gayon Evans; Jura Levy	44.96	Trinidad and Tobago (TRI); Kirlene Roberts; Kai Selvon; Deborah John; Nyoka Giles	45.38
4×400 m relay	United States (USA); Alishea Usery; Angele Cooper; Kellie Schueler; Diamond Richardson	3:36.34	Jamaica (JAM); Jodi-Ann Muir; Amoy Blake; Danielle Dowie; Nikita Tracey	3:37.65	Bahamas (BAH); Rashan Brown; Katrina Seymour; Katarina Smith; Shaunae Miller	3:42.17
10,000 m race walk	Erandi Magdalena Uribe (MEX)	50:07.00 PB	María Del Pilar Rayo (COL)	50:23.60	Anlly Pineda (COL)	50:36.40
High jump	Maya Pressley (USA)	1.76 m	Krystle Schade (USA)	1.76 m	Michelle Theophille (CAN)	1.76 m
Pole vault	Natalie Willer (USA)	4.30 m PB	Shade Weygandt (USA)	4.25 m	Ariane Beaumont-Courteau (CAN)	4.00 m
Long jump	Alitta Boyd (USA)	6.08 m (-1.9 m/s)	Christabel Nettey (CAN)	6.05 m (-1.2 m/s)	Lauryn Newson (USA)	5.98 m (-0.9 m/s)
Triple jump	Dailenis Alcántara Pacheco (CUB)	13.17 m (0.8 m/s)	Alitta Boyd (USA)	12.94 m (2.6 m/s)	Yudelsy González (VEN)	12.76 m (3.4 m/s)
Shot put	Anastasia Jelmini (USA)	16.37 m	Julie Labonté (CAN)	16.29 m	Geisa Arcanjo (BRA)	15.69 m
Discus throw	Andressa Morais (BRA)	55.28 m	Anastasia Jelmini (USA)	54.91 m	Erin Pendleton (USA)	48.01 m
Hammer throw	Yirisleydi Ford Carnonell (CUB)	63.92 m	Andressa Morais (BRA)	55.01 m	Elizabeth Rohl (USA)	54.24 m
Javelin throw	María Lucelly Murillo (COL)	51.76 m	Rafaela Gonçalves (BRA)	47.47 m	Jucilene de Lima (BRA)	47.10 m
Heptathlon	Vanessa Spínola (BRA)	5574 PB	Ryann Krais (USA)	5454 PB	Cynthia Alves (BRA)	5164

== Medal table ==
The medal count has been published.

* Host nation (Trinidad and Tobago)

Rank	Nation	Gold	Silver	Bronze	Total
1	United States	21	22	13	56
2	Cuba	6	0	0	6
3	Mexico	3	4	2	9
4	Jamaica	3	3	8	14
5	Canada	3	3	7	13
6	Brazil	2	6	5	13
7	Colombia	2	1	1	4
8	Argentina	1	1	0	2
9	Chile	1	0	1	2
9	Grenada	1	0	1	2
11	Panama	1	0	0	1
12	Trinidad and Tobago*	0	4	1	5
13	Puerto Rico	0	1	0	1
14	Bahamas	0	0	1	1
14	Barbados	0	0	1	1
14	Paraguay	0	0	1	1
14	Venezuela	0	0	1	1
Totals (17 entries)		44	45	43	132
