= Mariya Bespalova =

Russian hammer thrower (born 1986)

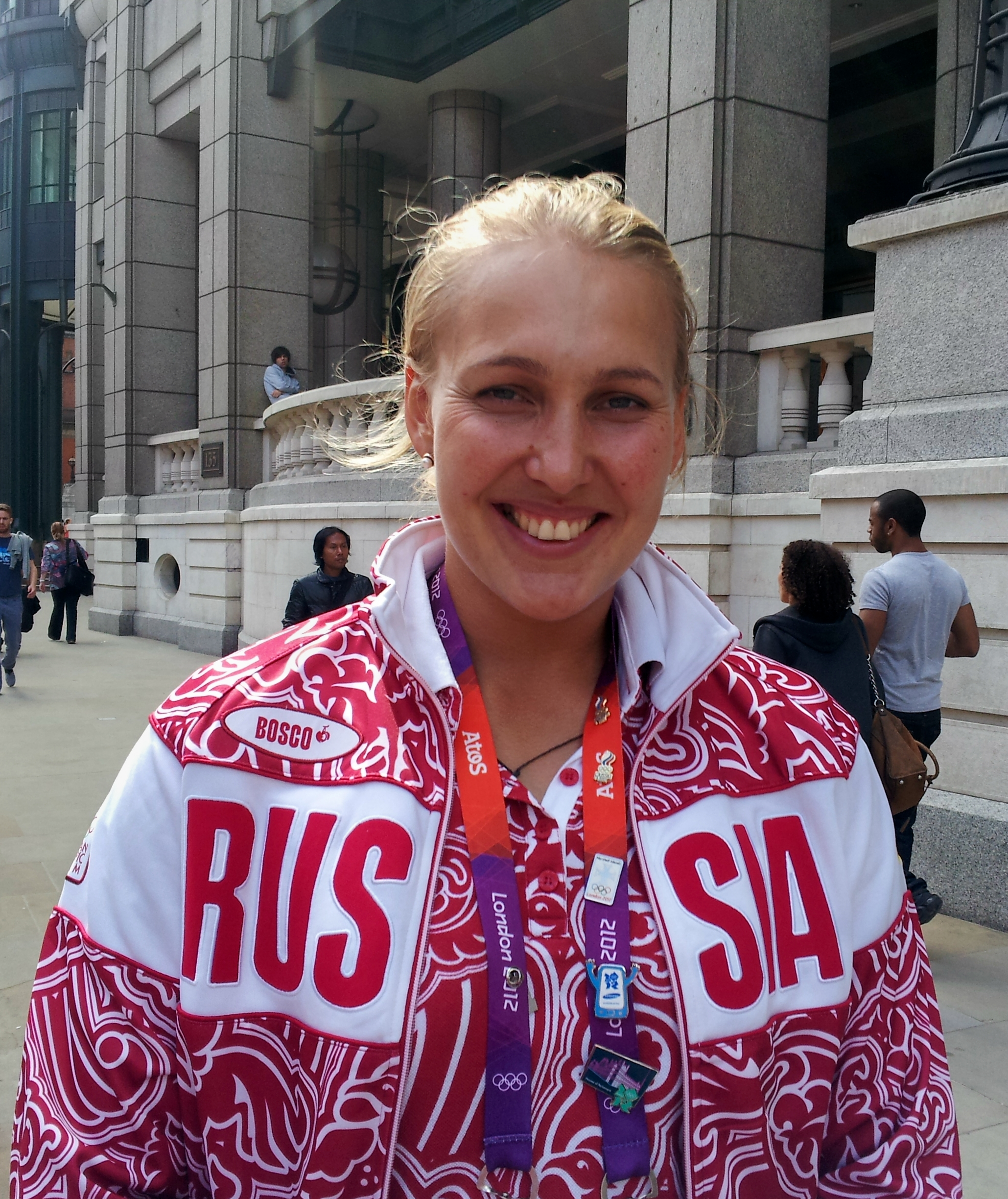
- Mariya Bespalova at the 2012 London Summer Olympics

Personal information
- Born: May 21, 1986 (age 40) Leningrad, Soviet Union
- Height: 1.83 m (6 ft 0 in)
- Weight: 85 kg (187 lb)

Sport
- Country: Russia
- Sport: Athletics
- Event: Hammer throw

Achievements and titles
- Personal best: 76.72 m (2012)

Mariya Aleksandrovna Bespalova (Russian: Мария Апександровна Беспалова; born 21 May 1986 in Leningrad) is a Russian hammer thrower. She competed in the hammer throw event at the 2012 Summer Olympics. On 30 March 2017, her 2012 Olympic results were annulled, after her second probe tested positive for banned substances.

In 2015, Bespalova was suspended for four years after she failed a drug test for dehydrochlormethyltestosterone doping.
