= Lipscomb University Austin Center =

Private Christian seminary in Texas

Coordinates: 30.3439°N 97.7117°W

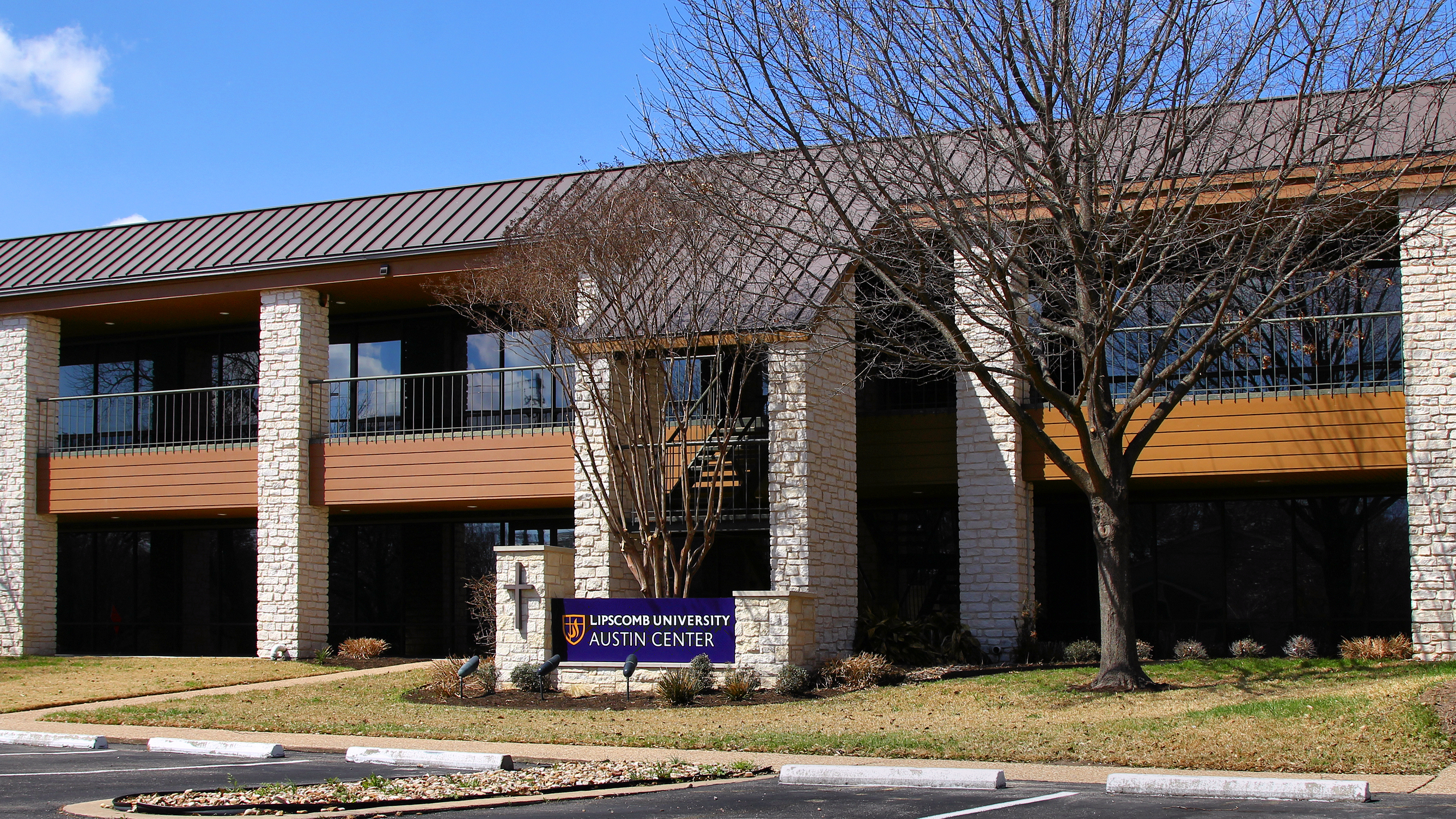
- Type: private seminary
- Established: 1917
- Religious affiliation: Churches of Christ
- Director: Michael Ross
- Location: Austin, Texas, US
- Website: lipscomb.edu/austin-center

Lipscomb University Austin Center, formerly known as the Austin Graduate School of Theology, and the Institute for Christian Studies, was a private Christian seminary associated with the Churches of Christ and located in Austin, Texas, United States. It was accredited by the Southern Association of Colleges and Schools Commission on Colleges to award bachelor's and master's degrees.

On January 1, 2021, the merger with Lipscomb University was completed and Austin Graduate School of Theology became known as Lipscomb University Austin Center (LUAC). LUAC was a wholly owned subsidiary of Lipscomb. Under the merger, the graduate offerings would be expanded to include Master of Divinity and Doctorate of Ministry programs.

On November 9, 2022, the office of the president of Lipscomb University announced the closure of the Austin center at the end of the Spring 2023 semester, citing a "number of challenges to successfully reviving the school" including the fallout of the COVID-19 pandemic and the economic environment. Coincidentally, LUAC Director Michael Ross served as President of Ohio Valley University at its closure in the fall of 2021.
