= Jiang Limin =

Chinese shot putter

Personal information
- Born: 20 February 1988 (age 38)

Sport
- Country: China
- Sport: Athletics
- Event: Shot put

Achievements and titles
- Personal best: Shot put: 17.51 m (2004)

Jiang Limin (Chinese: 江丽敏, born 29 February 1988) is a Chinese female shot putter who won two individual gold medal at the Youth World Championships.
