= Mansiche Sports Complex =

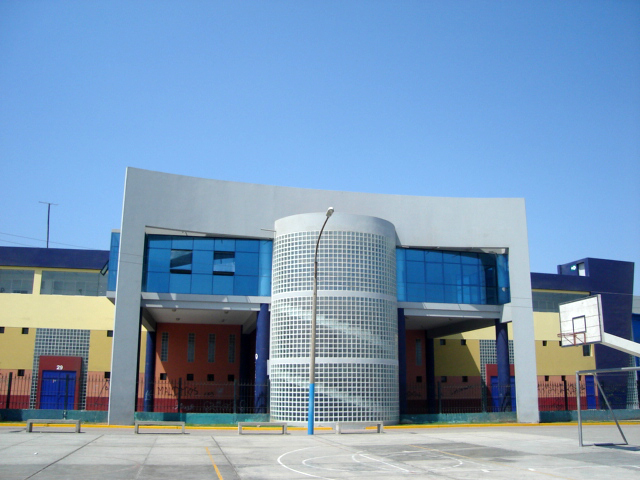
Estadio mansiche trujillo

The Sports complex Mansiche is the current home of Trujillo's professional sports teams, a city of northern Peru. This sport complex will be the main site of 2013 Bolivarian Games that will be held in the city in November 2013. It is located near the old and traditional town of San Salvador de Mansiche.

== Sport facilities ==
- Estadio Mansiche
- Coliseo Gran Chimu
- Swimming Pool, etc.

== See also ==
- San Salvador de Mansiche
- Historic Centre of Trujillo
- Chan Chan
- Huanchaco
- Puerto Chicama
- Chimu
- Pacasmayo beach
- Plaza de Armas of Trujillo
- Moche
- Víctor Larco Herrera District
- Vista Alegre
- Buenos Aires
- Las Delicias beach
- Independence of Trujillo
- Wall of Trujillo
- Santiago de Huamán
- Lake Conache
- Marinera Festival
- Trujillo Spring Festival
- Wetlands of Huanchaco
- Association of Breeders and Owners of Paso Horses in La Libertad
- Salaverry beach
- Puerto Morín
- Virú culture
- Marcahuamachuco
- Wiracochapampa
