= Marcus Rowland (athlete) =

American sprinter (born 1990)

Personal information
- Nationality: United States
- Born: March 11, 1990 (age 36) Spartanburg, S. C.

Sport
- Sport: Running
- Event(s): 100 metres, 200 metres
- College team: Auburn Tigers

Achievements and titles
- Personal best(s): 100 m: 10.03 (Port-of-Spain 2009); 200 m: 20.49 (Louisville 2009)
Medal record
Men's athletics
Representing the United States
Pan American Junior Championships
Gold medal – first place	2009 Port-of-Spain	100 m
Gold medal – first place	2009 Port-of-Spain	4×100 m relay

Marcus Rowland (born March 11, 1990) is an American sprinter who specialises in the 100 and 200 metres. He attended Auburn University and took part in the 2009 Pan American Junior Athletics Championships in Port-of-Spain, where he won a gold medal over 100 metres in 10.03 seconds, which as of April 2017 is the sixth-fastest ever run by a junior athlete.

== High school career ==
Rowland attended Paul M. Dorman High School in Roebuck, South Carolina, where he was a two-time South Carolina state champion in the 100 and 200 metres and broke a 17-year-old state record in the 100 metres, previously held by Stephen Davis of Spartanburg High School. At the 2008 Taco Bell Invitational in Columbia, he won the 100 m and 200 m with personal bests of 10.28 and 21.07, respectively. He was an All-American track and field selection by USA Today in 2008. Rowland also competed at the USA Junior National Championships in 2008.

== College career ==
In his first year at Auburn, Rowland finished third in the 200 meters at the 2009 NCAA Championships, clocking a time of 20.82 in the finals into a headwind while running from lane 1. He finished third in both the 100m and 200m at the 2009 SEC Outdoor Championships, and ran on both relays. In the 100 meters, his time in the finals of 10.13 seconds ranks fourth best in Auburn history.

Following the Auburn track season, Rowland won the 100 meters at the U.S. Junior National Championships, as he clocked a wind-aided time of 10.02 sec. He took part in the 2009 Pan American Junior Athletics Championships in Port-of-Spain, where he won a gold medal over 100 metres in 10.03 seconds, which as of April 2017 is the sixth-fastest ever run by a junior athlete. He also helped the United States 4×100 metres relay squad to a gold medal. Rowland was named " SEC Male Freshman Runner of the Year" in May 2009.

At the 2010 NCAA Indoor Track and Field Championships, Rowland finished second in the 60 metres, behind only Jeffery Demps, with a personal best of 6.58 seconds.

== Personal best ==
Distance	Time	venue
100 m	10.03 s	Port-of-Spain, Trinidad and Tobago (31 July 2009)
200 m	20.49 s	Louisville, Kentucky, USA (30 May 2009)
