= Cristine Spataru =

Romanian triple jumper

Personal information
- Born: 4 February 1986 (age 40)

Sport
- Country: Romania
- Sport: Athletics
- Event: Triple jump

Achievements and titles
- Personal best: Triple jump: 14.03 m (2004)

Cristine Spataru (born 4 February 1986) is a Romanian female triple jumper, who won an individual gold medal at the Youth World Championships.
