= Lisandra Ramos =

Cuban artist

- Born: August 22, 1987 (age 38); Havana, Cuba
- Occupations: Artist and Designer

Lisandra Ramos Martinez (born 1987) is an artist and designer from Cuba known for her assemblage and period costume design. Known for work in El Compañante and Ultimos dias en La Habana. Her work is on display in Havana, Cuba at the Fábrica de Arte.

== Early life and education ==
Lisandra Ramos was born in Havana, Cuba where she lives and works. She is a Graduate in Industrial Design. Superior Institute of Industrial Design. ISDI (Curse 2005- 2010). Her early experiences include the; Department of the design at the creative center FAME, completion 2012, Chandler. Independent Company of Teathre. 2009, Cooperation with the Theatre Company GAIA, completion 2009, Fura dels Baus and the Company of contemporary dance Retazos 2008.

== Work ==
1. Fábrica de Arte variety of art on display.
2. "Alicina" at Teatro Lírico Nacional de Cuba.
3. Contemporany dance show “EL MONTE”, of the Rosario Cardenas Dance Company, based on the texts by Lidia Cabrera “El Monte”. 2013.
4. GAIA theatre Group at sunset “God whose not Antonioni”. (Completation 2012).
5. German Co-production film “The Cut” by Turkish- German filmmaker Fatih Akim and producer Fifth Avenue. 2013.
6. Short film “The Beach” of the Hungary Filmmaker Adam Breier. 2013.
7. Short film “La Trucha” by the filmmaker Luis Ernesto Doñas. 2013.
8. Germany co-production film “The man without shadow” directed by Carlo Rola, and the production Company Fifth Avenue. 2014.
9. Video by the singer Grettel Barreiro, and directed by Josef Ross. 2014.
10. The film “The Companion” directed by Pavel Giroud. 2014-2015.
11. -Film “Last Days in Havana”, directed by Fernando Pérez. 2015.
