= Lisandra Rodriguez =

Cuban discus thrower

Personal information
- Born: 14 October 1986 (age 39)

Sport
- Country: Cuba
- Sport: Athletics
- Event: Discus throw

Achievements and titles
- Personal best: Discus throw: 59.08 m (2010)

Lisandra Rodriguez (born 14 October 1986) is a Cuban female discus thrower, who won an individual gold medal at the Youth World Championships.
