= Liu Feng (athlete) =

Chinese shot putter

Personal information
- Born: 1 March 1987 (age 38)

Sport
- Country: China
- Sport: Athletics
- Event: Shot put

Liu Feng (Chinese: 刘锋, born 1 March 1987) is a Chinese male shot putter who won two individual gold medal at the Youth World Championships.
