= Pan American U20 Athletics Championships =

Biennial sports event for track and field

The Pan American U20 Athletics Championships are a biennial sports event for track and field organized by the Association of Panamerican Athletics (APA) open for junior (U20) athletes from member and associate member associations. They were first held in 1980. Before the 2017 edition, the event was known as Pan American Junior Athletics Championships.

== Editions ==
#	Year	City	Country	Events	Date	Venue
1	1980	Sudbury	Canada	38	29–31 August	
2	1982	Barquisimeto	Venezuela	38	30 July – 1 August	
3	1984	Nassau	Bahamas	38	23–25 August	
4	1986	Winter Park	United States	38	4–6 July	
5	1989	Santa Fe	Argentina	40	23–25 June	Centro de Alto Rendimiento Deportivo Pedro Candioti
6	1991	Kingston	Jamaica	41	18–20 July	
7	1993	Winnipeg	Canada	41	15–17 July	
8	1995	Santiago	Chile	42	1–3 September	
9	1997	Havana	Cuba	43	18–20 July	
10	1999	Tampa	United States	43	9–11 July	
11	2001	Santa Fe	Argentina	43	18–20 October	Centro de Alto Rendimiento Deportivo Pedro Candioti
12	2003	Bridgetown	Barbados	43	18–20 July	Barbados National Stadium
13	2005	Windsor	Canada	44	29–31 July	University of Windsor Stadium
14	2007	São Paulo	Brazil	44	6–8 July	Estádio Ícaro de Castro Melo
15	2009	Port of Spain	Trinidad and Tobago	44	31 July – 2 August	Hasely Crawford Stadium
16	2011	Miramar	United States	44	22–24 July	Ansin Sports Complex
17	2013	Medellín	Colombia	44	23–25 August	Atanasio Girardot Sports Complex
18	2015	Edmonton	Canada	44	31 July–2 August	Foote Field
19	2017	Trujillo	Peru	44	21–23 July	Mansiche Sports Complex
20	2019	San José	Costa Rica	44	19–21 July	Estadio Nacional
21	2023	Mayagüez	Puerto Rico	44	4–6 August	Mayagüez Athletics Stadium
22	2025	Bogotá	Colombia	44	3–5 October	Estadio de Atletismo El Salitre

== Medals (1980-2019) ==
Pan American U20 Athletics Championships
Rank	Nation	Gold	Silver	Bronze	Total
1	United States	404	333	206	943
2	Cuba	111	76	57	244
3	Canada	81	123	143	347
4	Brazil	54	62	86	202
5	Jamaica	42	76	67	185
6	Mexico	40	36	36	112
7	Colombia	16	16	35	67
8	Argentina	11	15	25	51
9	Peru	11	8	13	32
10	Trinidad and Tobago	10	20	16	46
11	Bahamas	9	14	31	54
12	Ecuador	9	12	14	35
13	Chile	9	12	11	32
14	Venezuela	6	15	33	54
15	Puerto Rico	3	5	10	18
16	Cayman Islands	3	1	2	6
17	Antigua and Barbuda	2	2	2	6
17	El Salvador	2	2	2	6
19	Dominican Republic	2	1	3	6
19	Panama	2	1	3	6
21	Grenada	2	1	1	4
22	Bermuda	1	2	4	7
23	Paraguay	1	2	3	6
24	Saint Lucia	1	2	0	3
25	Bolivia	1	1	2	4
26	Guatemala	1	0	6	7
27	Uruguay	1	0	3	4
28	Anguilla	1	0	0	1
28	Netherlands Antilles	1	0	0	1
30	Barbados	0	7	12	19
31	Saint Kitts and Nevis	0	2	2	4
32	Guyana	0	0	3	3
33	Costa Rica	0	0	1	1
33	Dominica	0	0	1	1
33	Nicaragua	0	0	1	1
33	Saint Vincent and the Grenadines	0	0	1	1
Totals (36 entries)		837	847	835	2,519

== Championships records ==
=== Men ===
Event	Record	Athlete	Nationality	Date	Meet	Place	Ref.
100 m	10.03 (+0.7 m/s)	Marcus Rowland	United States	2009	2009 Championships	Port of Spain, Trinidad and Tobago	
200 m	20.13 (+0.0 m/s)	Usain Bolt	Jamaica	July 2003	2003 Championships	Bridgetown, Barbados	
400 m	44.99	Jamal Walton	Cayman Islands	21 July 2017	2017 Championships	Trujillo, Peru	
800 m	1:46.41	Ryan Sánchez	Puerto Rico	22 July 2017	2017 Championships	Trujillo, Peru	
1500 m	3:43.16	Eric van der Els	United States	23 July 2017	2017 Championships	Trujillo, Peru	
5000 m	14:12.11	Mohammed Ahmed	Canada	2009	2009 Championships	Port of Spain, Trinidad and Tobago	
10,000 m	29:28.6	Alejandro Villanueva	Mexico	June 1989	1989 Championships	Santa Fe, Argentina	
110 m hurdles (99.0 cm)	13.08 (+2.0 m/s) WJR	Wayne Davis	United States	2009	2009 Championships	Port of Spain, Trinidad and Tobago	
400 m hurdles	48.49 A	Alison Santos	Brazil	21 July 2019	2019 Championships	San José, Costa Rica	
3000 m steeplechase	8:43.96	José Alberto Sánchez	Cuba	July 2005	2005 Championships	Windsor, Canada	
High jump	2.27 m	Javier Sotomayor	Cuba	July 1986	1986 Championships	Winter Park, United States	
Pole vault	5.50 m	Lawrence Johnson	United States	July 1993	1993 Championships	Winnipeg, Canada	
Long jump	8.16 m	Dion Bentley	United States	June 1989	1989 Championships	Santa Fe, Argentina	
Triple jump	16.93 m (−0.5 m/s)	David Giralt	Cuba	July 2003	2003 Championships	Bridgetown, Barbados	
Shot put (6 kg)	22.02 m	Jordan Geist	United States	23 July 2017	2017 Championships	Trujillo, Peru	
Discus throw (1.75 kg)	66.58 m	Travis Smikle	Jamaica	July 2011	2011 Championships	Miramar, United States	
Hammer throw (6 kg)	80.21 m	Humberto Mansilla	Chile	2 August 2015	2015 Championships	Edmonton, Canada	
Javelin throw	76.95 m A	Tzuriel Pedigo	United States	20 July 2019	2019 Championships	San José, Costa Rica	
Decathlon	8037 pts	Harrison Williams	United States	31 July – 1 August 2015	2015 Championships	Edmonton, Canada	
Decathlon	100m / Long jump / Shot put / High jump / 400m / 110m H / Discus / Pole vault / Javelin / 1500m; 10.67 (+2.9 m/s) / 6.98 m (+3.7 m/s) / 13.71 m / 2.03 m / 48.28 / 14.41 (−1.0 m/s) / 39.68 m / 5.00 m / 51.77 m / 4:29.20						
5000 m walk (track)	20:42.31 A	Iván Oña	Ecuador	3 October 2025	2025 Championships	Bogotá, Colombia	
10,000 m walk (track)	39:50.73	Jefferson Pérez	Ecuador	July 1993	1993 Championships	Winnipeg, Canada	
4 × 100 m relay	38.62 A WU20R	Arian Smith; Justin Ofotan; Marcellus Moore; Matthew Boling	United States	20 July 2019	2019 Championships	San José, Costa Rica	
4 × 400 m relay	2:59.30 A WU20R	Frederick Lewis; Matthew Boling; Matthew Moorer; Justin Robinson	United States	21 July 2019	2019 Championships	San José, Costa Rica	

=== Women ===
Event	Record	Athlete	Nationality	Date	Meet	Place	Ref.
100 m	11.22 (+0.8 m/s)	Chalonda Goodman	United States	2009	2009 Championships	Port of Spain, Trinidad and Tobago	
200 m	22.35 (+1.6 m/s)	Shawnti Jackson	United States	6 August 2023	2023 Championships	Mayagüez, Puerto Rico	
400 m	51.46	Roxana Gomez	Cuba	21 July 2017	2017 Championships	Trujillo, Peru	
800 m	2:03.70	Mairelín Fuentes	Cuba	July 1997	1997 Championships	Havana, Cuba	
1500 m	4:16.07	Fabiana Da Silva	Brazil	July 1997	1997 Championships	Havana, Cuba	
3000 m	9:05.78	Ellie Shea	United States	6 August 2023	2023 Championships	Mayagüez, Puerto Rico	
5000 m	16:23.35	Rachael Reddy	United States	1 August 2015	2015 Championships	Edmonton, Canada	
100 m hurdles	13.01 (+0.4 m/s)	Tia Jones	United States	21 July 2017	2017 Championships	Trujillo, Peru	
400 m hurdles	55.94 A	Jessica de Oliveira	Brazil	21 July 2019	2019 Championships	San José, Costa Rica	
3000 m steeplechase	10:04.71	Sabine Heitling	Brazil	July 2005	2005 Championships	Windsor, Canada	
High jump	1.96 m =WYB	Vashti Cunningham	United States	1 August 2015	2015 Championships	Edmonton, Canada	
Pole vault	4.41 m	Rachel Baxter	United States	21 July 2017	2017 Championships	Trujillo, Peru	
Long jump	6.46 m (−0.4 m/s)	Yudelkis Fernández	Cuba	July 2003	2003 Championships	Bridgetown, Barbados	
Triple jump	14.08 m (±0.0 m/s)	Liadagmis Povea	Cuba	2 August 2015	2015 Championships	Edmonton, Canada	
Shot put	18.27 m	Raven Saunders	United States	31 July 2015	2015 Championships	Edmonton, Canada	
Discus throw	59.53 m A	Melany del Pilar Matheus	Cuba	20 July 2019	2019 Championships	San José, Costa Rica	
Hammer throw	64.80 m	Arasay Tondike	Cuba	July 2005	2005 Championships	Windsor, Canada	
Javelin throw	63.86 m WJR	Yuleimis Aguilar	Cuba	2 August 2015	2015 Championships	Edmonton, Canada	
Heptathlon	5847 pts A (Note: wind-assisted score. Her wind-legal leap of 5.49m in the long jump gives her a record-eligible score of 5829)	Anna Hall	United States	20–21 July 2019	2019 Championships	San José, Costa Rica	
Heptathlon	100m H / High jump / Shot put / 200m / Long jump / Javelin / 800m; 14.11 (−0.7 m/s) / 1.82 m / 12.53 m / 24.22 (+0.9 m/s) / 5.55 m (+5.1 m/s) (w) / 33.70 m / 2:10.11						
5000 m walk (track)	23:40.16 A	Ruby Segura	Colombia	3 October 2025	2025 Championships	Bogotá, Colombia	
10,000 m walk (track)	44:43.89	Alegna González	Mexico	23 July 2017	2017 Championships	Trujillo, Peru	
4 × 100 m relay	42.88	Kaila Jackson; Camryn Dickson; Avery Lewis; Shawnti Jackson	United States	5 August 2023	2023 Championships	Mayagüez, Puerto Rico	
4 × 400 m relay	3:24.04 A	Alexis Holmes; Kimberly Harris; Ziyah Holman; Kayla Davis	United States	21 July 2019	2019 Championships	San José, Costa Rica	

=== Mixed ===
Event	Record	Athlete	Nationality	Date	Meet	Place	Ref.
4 × 400 m relay	3:18.07	George Garcia; Madison Whyte; Max De Angelo; JaMeesia Ford	United States	4 August 2023	2023 Championships	Mayagüez, Puerto Rico	
