= 2021 European Athletics U23 Championships – Men's 400 metres hurdles =

Men's 400 metres hurdles at the 2021 European Athletics U23 Championships
- Venue: Kadriorg Stadium, Tallinn
- Dates: 8–10 July
- Competitors: 29 from 20 nations
- Winning time: 48.42

Medalists
gold medal	Alessandro Sibilio	Italy
silver medal	Emil Agyekum	Germany
bronze medal	Ramsey Angela	Netherlands

The men's 400 metres hurdles event at the 2021 European Athletics U23 Championships was held in Tallinn, Estonia, at Kadriorg Stadium on 8, 9 and 10 July.

== Records ==
Prior to the competition, the records were as follows:

European U23 record	Karsten Warholm (NOR)	47.64	Berlin, Germany	9 August 2018
Championship U23 record	Karsten Warholm (NOR)	48.37	Bydgoszcz, Poland	16 July 2017

== Results ==
=== Round 1 ===
Qualification rule: First 3 in each heat (Q) and the next 4 fastest (q) advance to the Semi-Finals.

Rank	Heat	Name	Nationality	Time	Notes
1	3	Ramsey Angela	Netherlands	50.26	Q
2	1	Alex Knibbs	Great Britain	50.27	Q
3	1	Emil Agyekum	Germany	50.39	Q
4	1	Matej Baluch	Slovakia	50.70	Q, PB
5	2	Sebastian Urbaniak	Poland	50.82	q, =PB
6	2	Alessandro Sibilio	Italy	50.88	Q
7	3	Krzysztof Hołub	Poland	51.02	Q
8	4	Patrik Dӧmӧtӧr	Slovakia	51.07	Q, PB
9	2	Alastair Chalmers	Great Britain	51.21	Q
10	2	Iker Alfonso de Miguel	Spain	51.21	Q, SB
11	4	Omri Shiff	Israel	51.25	Q, PB
12	1	Johan Claeson	Sweden	51.29	q, PB
13	3	Julien Bonvin	Switzerland	51.31	Q
14	4	Tuur Bras	Belgium	51.34	Q
15	4	Jesús David Delgado	Spain	51.35	q
16	2	Sales Inglin	Switzerland	51.36	q
17	3	Leonardo Puca	Italy	51.60	
18	3	Filip Ličman	Czech Republic	51.66	PB
19	4	Michele Bertoldo	Italy	51.85	
20	1	Lukas Lessel	Estonia	51.88	PB
21	4	Yuben Gonçalves Munary	Turkey	51.94	PB
22	1	Jack Mitchell	Ireland	52.07	
23	4	Nahom Yirga	Switzerland	52.20	
24	3	Darius Marian Făgăraș	Romania	52.28	
25	2	Uladzimir Zhadzka	Belarus	52.30	
26	2	Michal Hušek	Czech Republic	52.39	
27	3	Leo Köhldorfer	Austria	52.72	
28	1	Ierotheos Dritsas	Greece	52.85	
29	2	Nikolasz Csókás	Hungary	54.20	
	4	Carl Bengtström	Sweden	DNS	

=== Semifinals ===
Qualification rule: First 3 in each heat (Q) and the next 2 fastest (q) advance to the Final.

Rank	Heat	Name	Nationality	Time	Notes
1	1	Ramsey Angela	Netherlands	49.17	Q, PB
2	2	Alessandro Sibilio	Italy	49.79	Q
3	2	Alex Knibbs	Great Britain	50.00	Q
4	1	Alastair Chalmers	Great Britain	50.11	Q
5	2	Julien Bonvin	Switzerland	50.31	Q
6	1	Emil Agyekum	Germany	50.42	Q
7	2	Matej Baluch	Slovakia	50.59	q, PB
8	2	Jesús David Delgado	Spain	50.69	q
9	2	Krzysztof Hołub	Poland	50.89	PB
10	1	Tuur Bras	Belgium	51.00	
11	1	Sebastian Urbaniak	Poland	51.03	
12	1	Iker Alfonso de Miguel	Spain	51.61	
13	2	Omri Shiff	Israel	51.67	
14	2	Johan Claeson	Sweden	51.74	
15	1	Patrik Dӧmӧtӧr	Slovakia	51.75	
	1	Sales Inglin	Switzerland	DQ	TR22.6.3

=== Final ===
Rank	Lane	Name	Nationality	Time	Notes
1st place, gold medalist(s)	5	Alessandro Sibilio	Italy	48.42	EU23L, PB
2nd place, silver medalist(s)	8	Emil Agyekum	Germany	48.96	PB
3rd place, bronze medalist(s)	3	Ramsey Angela	Netherlands	49.07	PB
4	6	Alex Knibbs	Great Britain	49.37	PB
5	7	Julien Bonvin	Switzerland	49.56	PB
6	4	Alastair Chalmers	Great Britain	49.84	SB
7	2	Matej Baluch	Slovakia	51.17	
8	1	Jesús David Delgado	Spain	52.86	
