= 2019 European Athletics U23 Championships – Men's 400 metres hurdles =

The men's 400 metres hurdles event at the 2019 European Athletics U23 Championships was held in Gävle, Sweden, at Gavlehov Stadium Park on 12, 13 and 14 July.

== Medalists ==
Gold	Silver	Bronze
Wilfried Happio; France	Nick Smidt; Netherlands	Emil Agyekum; Germany

== Result ==
=== Heats ===
Qualification: First 3 in each heat (Q) and next 4 fastest (q) qualified for the semifinals.

Rank	Heat	Name	Nationality	Time	Notes
1	2	Constantin Preis	Germany	50.85	Q
2	2	Aleix Porras	Spain	51.09	Q
3	2	Victor Coroller	France	51.10	Q
4	2	Vladimir Lysenko	Authorised Neutral Athletes	51.16	q
5	4	Alex Knibbs	Great Britain	51.24	Q
6	4	Dylan Owusu	Belgium	51.25	Q
7	1	Maksims Sinčukovs	Latvia	51.26	Q
8	4	Wilfried Happio	France	51.32	Q
9	1	Nick Smidt	Netherlands	51.36	Q
10	4	Dmytro Romanyuk	Ukraine	51.50	q, PB
11	3	Ivan Loginov	Authorised Neutral Athletes	51.58	Q
12	4	Jesús David Delgado	Spain	51.69	q
13	3	Emil Agyekum	Germany	51.77	Q
14	3	Ramsey Angela	Netherlands	51.82	Q
15	2	Adam Yakobi	Israel	51.89	q
16	2	Karl Erik Nazarov	Estonia	52.14	SB
17	1	Matěj Mach	Czech Republic	52.19	Q
18	1	Alessandro Sibilio	Italy	52.23	
19	3	Sinan Ören	Turkey	52.44	
20	1	Julien Bonvin	Switzerland	52.53	
21	3	Sales Inglin	Switzerland	52.72	
22	1	Sebastian Gaugl	Austria	53.08	
23	1	Dániel Varga	Hungary	53.11	
24	2	Erik Jelínek	Czech Republic	54.15	
25	4	William Frobe	Sweden	55.26	
26	4	Anastasios Vasileiou	Cyprus	55.74	
	3	Iļja Petrušenko	Latvia	DQ	R168.7(a)

=== Semifinals ===
Qualification: First 3 in each heat (Q) and next 2 fastest (q) qualified for the final.

Rank	Heat	Name	Nationality	Time	Notes
1	2	Constantin Preis	Germany	50.03	Q
2	2	Nick Smidt	Netherlands	50.05	Q
3	1	Emil Agyekum	Germany	50.17	Q, PB
4	1	Wilfried Happio	France	50.26	Q
5	1	Maksims Sinčukovs	Latvia	50.44	Q, SB
6	2	Aleix Porras	Spain	50.50	Q
7	1	Alex Knibbs	Great Britain	50.56	q
8	1	Ramsey Angela	Netherlands	50.72	q
9	2	Victor Coroller	France	50.89	
10	2	Dmytro Romanyuk	Ukraine	50.92	PB
11	2	Ivan Loginov	Authorised Neutral Athletes	51.20	
12	1	Jesús David Delgado	Spain	51.34	
13	1	Vladimir Lysenko	Authorised Neutral Athletes	51.50	
14	2	Matěj Mach	Czech Republic	53.31	
15	1	Dylan Owusu	Belgium	53.55	
	2	Adam Yakobi	Israel	DQ	R168.7

=== Final ===
Rank	Lane	Name	Nationality	Time	Notes
1st place, gold medalist(s)	6	Wilfried Happio	France	49.03	EU23L, PB
2nd place, silver medalist(s)	4	Nick Smidt	Netherlands	49.49	PB
3rd place, bronze medalist(s)	5	Emil Agyekum	Germany	49.69	PB
4	3	Constantin Preis	Germany	49.92	
5	7	Maksims Sinčukovs	Latvia	50.04	NU23R
6	8	Aleix Porras	Spain	50.45	
7	1	Ramsey Angela	Netherlands	50.51	
8	2	Alex Knibbs	Great Britain	50.82	
