= 2018 IAAF World U20 Championships – Men's 400 metres hurdles =

Men's 400 metres hurdles at the 2018 World U20 Championships
- Venue: Ratina Stadium
- Dates: 12, 13 and 14 July
- Competitors: 42 from 31 nations
- Winning time: 49.42

Medalists
gold medal	Sokwakhana Zazini	South Africa
silver medal	Bassem Hemeida	Qatar
bronze medal	Alison dos Santos	Brazil

The men's 400 metres hurdles at the 2018 IAAF World U20 Championships was held at Ratina Stadium on 12, 13 and 14 July.

== Records ==
Standing records prior to the 2021 World Athletics U20 Championships
World U20 Record	Danny Harris (USA)	48.02	Los Angeles, United States	17 June 1984
Championship Record	Kerron Clement (USA)	48.51	Grosseto, Italy	16 July 2004
World U20 Leading	Sokwakhana Zazini (RSA)	49.32	Pretoria, South Africa	17 March 2018

== Results ==
=== Heats ===
Qualification: First 3 of each heat (Q) and the 6 fastest times (q) qualified for the semifinals.

Rank	Heat	Name	Nationality	Time	Note
1	4	Moitalel Mpoke Naadokila	Kenya	50.87	Q, PB
2	3	Rasheeme Griffith	Barbados	51.02	Q, SB
3	4	Alison dos Santos	Brazil	51.08	Q
4	2	Alastair Chalmers	United Kingdom	51.16	Q
5	5	Sokwakhana Zazini	South Africa	51.21	Q
6	5	Alex Knibbs	United Kingdom	51.29	Q
7	4	Carl Bengtström	Sweden	51.35	Q
8	4	Ierotheos Dritsas	Greece	51.39	q, PB
9	6	Malik James-King	Jamaica	51.54	Q
10	2	Alessandro Sibilio	Italy	51.59	Q SB
11	2	Julien Bonvin	Switzerland	51.64	Q, PB
12	3	Leonardo Ledgister	Jamaica	51.65	Q
13	3	Quivell Jordan	United States	51.75	Q
14	3	Aleix Porras	Spain	51.83	q
15	2	Ramsey Angela	Netherlands	51.95	q
16	4	Nathan Fergusson	Barbados	52.02	q, PB
17	6	Yusuke Shirao	Japan	52.09	Q
18	1	Cory Poole	United States	52.12	Q
19	5	Jesús David Delgado	Spain	52.13	Q
20	4	Mahdi Pirjahan	Iran	52.18	q
21	3	Ismail Manyani	Morocco	52.24	q
22	1	Bassem Hemeida	Qatar	52.35	Q
23	1	Lourens Steenekamp	South Africa	52.35	Q
24	6	Boaz Madeus	Haiti	52.38	Q
25	1	Hayata Goto	Japan	52.48	
26	5	Gadisa Bayu	Ethiopia	52.59	
27	6	Samuele Licata	Italy	52.60	
28	5	Emil Agyekum	Germany	52.70	
29	1	Karl Erik Nazarov	Estonia	52.80	
30	6	Fu Jiahao	China	52.82	PB
31	2	James Mucheru	Kenya	52.88	
32	3	Harvey Murrant	Australia	53.02	
33	2	Dániel Huller	Hungary	53.13	
34	3	Vesa Kittilä	Finland	53.21	PB
35	5	Damián Moretta	Argentina	53.43	
36	5	Fahd Benammar	Tunisia	53.71	
37	4	Nathaniel St. Romain	Canada	53.85	
38	1	Anton Bertilsson	Sweden	54.82	
39	1	Branson Rolle	Bahamas	1:08.85	
	2	Sergio Armando Esquivel	Mexico	DNF	
	6	Norman Mukwada	Zimbabwe	DQ	
	6	Justus Ringel	Germany	DQ	

=== Semifinals ===
Qualification: First 2 of each heat (Q) and the 2 fastest times (q) qualified for the final.

Rank	Heat	Name	Nationality	Time	Note
1	3	Sokwakhana Zazini	South Africa	49.43	Q
2	3	Alastair Chalmers	United Kingdom	50.11	Q, NJR
3	3	Leonardo Ledgister	Jamaica	50.13	q, PB
4	2	Malik James-King	Jamaica	50.34	Q
5	3	Alessandro Sibilio	Italy	50.73	q, SB
6	3	Quivell Jordan	United States	50.86	
7	1	Alison dos Santos	Brazil	50.90	Q
8	2	Mahdi Pirjahan	Iran	50.98	Q, NJR
9	2	Alex Knibbs	United Kingdom	50.99	
10	2	Rasheeme Griffith	Barbados	51.02	SB
11	1	Bassem Hemeida	Qatar	51.14	Q
12	2	Yusuke Shirao	Japan	51.21	
13	2	Lourens Steenekamp	South Africa	51.26	
14	1	Cory Poole	United States	51.27	
15	1	Carl Bengtström	Sweden	51.55	
16	2	Julien Bonvin	Switzerland	51.83	
17	1	Moitalel Mpoke Naadokila	Kenya	51.94	
18	3	Ramsey Angela	Netherlands	51.99	
19	3	Jesús David Delgado	Spain	52.18	
20	1	Ierotheos Dritsas	Greece	52.38	
21	1	Boaz Madeus	Haiti	54.45	
22	3	Nathan Fergusson	Barbados	54.58	
	1	Ismail Manyani	Morocco	DQ	
	2	Aleix Porras	Spain	DNS	

=== Final ===
Rank	Lane	Name	Nationality	Time	Note
1st place, gold medalist(s)	4	Sokwakhana Zazini	South Africa	49.42	
2nd place, silver medalist(s)	7	Bassem Hemeida	Qatar	49.59	PB
3rd place, bronze medalist(s)	6	Alison dos Santos	Brazil	49.78	PB
4	2	Leonardo Ledgister	Jamaica	49.93	PB
5	3	Malik James-King	Jamaica	50.25	
6	5	Alastair Chalmers	United Kingdom	50.27	
7	8	Mahdi Pirjahan	Iran	51.15	
8	1	Alessandro Sibilio	Italy	52.38	
