= 2026 European Athletics Championships – Men's 400 metres hurdles =

Men's 400 metres hurdles at the 2026 European Athletics Championships
- Venue: Alexander Stadium
- Location: Birmingham, United Kingdom
- Dates: 11 August 2026 (round 1); 12 August 2026 (semi-finals); 14 August 2026 (final)
- Competitors: 36 (target)
- Winning time: 46.63 CR

Medalists
gold medal	Karsten Warholm	Norway
silver medal	Emil Agyekum	Germany
bronze medal	İsmail Nezir	Turkey

The men's 400 metres hurdles at the 2026 European Athletics Championships took place over three rounds at the Alexander Stadium in Birmingham, United Kingdom, from 11 to 14 August 2026.

== Background ==
Records before the 2026 European Athletics Championships
Record	Athlete (nation)	Time	Location	Date
World record	Karsten Warholm (NOR)	45.94	Tokyo, Japan	3 August 2021
European record	Karsten Warholm (NOR)	45.94	Tokyo, Japan	3 August 2021
Championship record	Karsten Warholm (NOR)	46.98	Rome, Italy	11 June 2024
European leading	Karsten Warholm (NOR)	46.61	London, United Kingdom	18 July 2026
World leading	Alison dos Santos (BRA)	46.48	São Paulo, Brazil	26 July 2026

== Qualification ==
For the men's 400 metres hurdles, the qualification period was from 27 July 2025 to 26 July 2026. Athletes qualified by running the entry standard of 49.00 or faster, by wildcard for the 2024 European Athletics Champion, or by their position on the World Athletics Rankings for the event. The target number was 36 athletes.

Qualification standings per 31 July 2026
QP	CP	Country	Athlete	Status	Details
1	1	Norway	Karsten Warholm	Qualified by Wild Card	Defending European Champion
2	1	Germany	Emil Agyekum	Qualified by Entry Standard	47.45 - Olympic Stadium, London (GBR) - 18 JUL 2026
3	2	Germany	Owe Fischer-Breiholz	Qualified by Entry Standard	48.08 - Lohrheidestadion, Wattenscheid, Bochum (GER) - 26 JUL 2026
4	1	Spain	Jesús David Delgado	Qualified by Entry Standard	48.11 - Mestský Stadion, Ostrava (CZE) - 16 JUN 2026
5	1	Sweden	Carl Bengtström	Qualified by Entry Standard	48.11 - Sola Arena, Karlstad (SWE) - 08 JUL 2026
6	1	Slovenia	Matic Ian Guček	Qualified by Entry Standard	48.16 - Mestský Stadion, Ostrava (CZE) - 16 JUN 2026
7	1	Turkey	İsmail Nezir	Qualified by Entry Standard	48.25 - National Stadium, Tokyo (JPN) - 17 MAY 2026
8	2	Sweden	Oskar Edlund	Qualified by Entry Standard	48.26 - Sola Arena, Karlstad (SWE) - 08 JUL 2026
9	1	France	Clement Ducos	Qualified by Entry Standard	48.49 - Cushing Stadium, College Station, TX (USA) - 06 JUN 2026
10	1	Italy	Alessandro Sibilio	Qualified by Entry Standard	48.49 - Estadio Vallehermoso, Madrid (ESP) - 16 JUL 2026
11	1	Great Britain & N.I.	Alastair Chalmers	Qualified by Entry Standard	48.53 - Paavo Nurmen Stadion, Turku (FIN) - 03 JUN 2026
12	2	Great Britain & N.I.	Jake Minshull	Qualified by Entry Standard	48.53 - Sola Arena, Karlstad (SWE) - 08 JUL 2026
13	2	Turkey	Berke Akçam	Qualified by Entry Standard	48.68 - National Stadium, Tokyo (JPN) - 15 SEP 2025
14	3	Great Britain & N.I.	Seamus Derbyshire	Qualified by Entry Standard	48.71 - Ratinan Stadion, Tampere (FIN) - 12 JUL 2026
reserve	4	Great Britain & N.I.	Joshua Faulds	Qualified by Entry Standard	48.78 - Estadio Vallehermoso, Madrid (ESP) - 16 JUL 2026
15	1	Switzerland	Julien Bonvin	Qualified by Entry Standard	48.93 - Stade L. Masson, Tarare (FRA) - 20 JUN 2026
16	1	Slovakia	Patrik Dömötör	Qualified by Entry Standard	48.94 - Štadión SNP, Banská Bystrica (SVK) - 08 AUG 2025
17	1	Austria	Niklas Strohmayer-Dangl	Qualified by World Rankings	19th - 1210 points
18	2	Slovakia	Matej Baluch	Qualified by World Rankings	22nd - 1203 points
19	2	Switzerland	Dany Brand	Qualified by World Rankings	25th - 1187 points
20	1	Finland	Antti Sainio	Qualified by World Rankings	27th - 1179 points
21	1	Denmark	Sebastian Monneret	Qualified by World Rankings	28th - 1178 points
22	1	Portugal	Diogo Barrigana	Qualified by World Rankings	29th - 1178 points
23	1	Belgium	Julien Watrin	Qualified by World Rankings	30th - 1176 points
24	1	Serbia	Mihajlo Katanić	Qualified by World Rankings	33rd - 1170 points
25	2	Italy	Giacomo Bertoncelli	Qualified by World Rankings	36th - 1169 points
26	3	Italy	Alessio Sommacal	Qualified by World Rankings	39th - 1159 points
27	2	Spain	Javier Lorente	Qualified by World Rankings	40th - 1159 points
reserve	4	Italy	Michele Bertoldo	Qualified by World Rankings	41st - 1158 points
28	1	Israel	Omri Shiff	Qualified by World Rankings	45th - 1154 points
29	1	Hungary	Csaba Molnár	Qualified by World Rankings	49th - 1148 points
reserve	5	Italy	Riccardo Berrino	Qualified by World Rankings	51st - 1145 points
30	1	Greece	Dimitris Levantinos	Qualified by World Rankings	56th - 1134 points
31	2	Finland	Jere Haapalainen	Qualified by World Rankings	59th - 1131 points
32	3	Finland	Tuomas Lehtonen	Qualified by World Rankings	61st - 1129 points
33	2	Hungary	Árpád Bánóczy	Qualified by World Rankings	62nd - 1129 points
34	2	Portugal	Mikael Antonio De Jesús	Qualified by World Rankings	63rd - 1127 points
35	2	Austria	Leo Köhldorfer	Qualified by World Rankings	66th - 1117 points
36	2	Slovenia	Mitja Zubin	Qualified by World Rankings	67th - 1113 points
reserve	3	Sweden	Karl Wållgren	Next best by World Rankings	78th - 1107 points

Bye to semi-finals	Reserve activated	Withdrawal / reserve unused

== Schedule ==
Date	Time	Round
11 August 2026	12:40	Round 1
12 August 2026	12:55	Semi-finals
14 August 2026	20:40	Final

All times are local times (UTC+1)

== Results ==
=== Round 1 ===
Round 1 was held on 11 August 2026, at 12:40 in the afternoon. 13 best performers (q) advanced to the semi-finals.

==== Heat 1 ====
Place	Lane	Athlete	Nation	Time	Notes
1	2	Joshua Faulds	Great Britain & N.I.	48.90	q
2	5	Matej Baluch	Slovakia	48.94	q, =NR
3	4	Dany Brand	Switzerland	49.07	q, SB
4	8	Alessio Sommacal	Italy	49.40	q
5	3	Mihajlo Katanić	Serbia	49.66	q, =PB
6	7	Dimitris Levantinos	Greece	50.03	PB
7	6	Mikael Antonio de Jesus	Portugal	50.20	SB
8	9	Jere Haapalainen	Finland	50.37	SB

==== Heat 2 ====
Place	Lane	Athlete	Nation	Time	Notes
1	9	Julien Watrin	Belgium	49.24	q
2	7	Niklas Strohmayer-Dangl	Austria	49.39	q
3	8	Antti Sainio	Finland	49.70	q, SB
4	6	Patrik Dömötör	Slovakia	49.71	q
5	2	Sebastian Monneret	Denmark	49.94	q
6	3	Mitja Zubin	Slovenia	50.61	
7	4	Árpád Bánóczy	Hungary	50.78	
—	5	Omri Shiff	Israel	DQ	

==== Heat 3 ====
Place	Lane	Athlete	Nation	Time	Notes
1	6	Berke Akçam	Turkey	49.18	q, SB
2	3	Diogo Barrigana	Portugal	49.77	q
3	7	Giacomo Bertoncelli	Italy	49.82	q
4	5	Julien Bonvin	Switzerland	50.49	
5	4	Javier Lorente	Spain	50.50	
6	9	Tuomas Lehtonen	Finland	50.83	
7	2	Csaba Molnár	Hungary	50.85	
8	8	Leo Köhldorfer	Austria	51.02	

=== Semi-finals ===
The semi-finals were held on 12 August 2026, at 12:55 in the afternoon. First 2 in each heat (Q) and the next 2 by time (q) qualified for the final.

==== Heat 1 ====
Place	Lane	Athlete	Nation	Time	Notes
1	7	Oskar Edlund	Sweden	47.81	Q, NR
2	8	Owe Fischer-Breiholz	Germany	48.23	Q
3	5	Jesús David Delgado	Spain	48.37	q
4	4	Berke Akçam	Turkey	48.56	SB
5	6	Jake Minshull	Great Britain & N.I.	48.73	
6	9	Niklas Strohmayer-Dangl	Austria	49.20	
7	2	Patrik Dömötör	Slovakia	49.67	
8	3	Giacomo Bertoncelli	Italy	50.41	

==== Heat 2 ====
Place	Lane	Athlete	Nation	Time	Notes
1	5	Emil Agyekum	Germany	48.17	Q
2	6	Alessandro Sibilio	Italy	48.44	Q, SB
3	7	Carl Bengtström	Sweden	48.47	
4	9	Dany Brand	Switzerland	48.96	=PB
5	4	Julien Watrin	Belgium	49.39	
6	3	Mihajlo Katanić	Serbia	49.61	PB
7	8	Alastair Chalmers	Great Britain & N.I.	49.71	
8	2	Sebastian Monneret	Denmark	50.17	

==== Heat 3 ====
Place	Lane	Athlete	Nation	Time	Notes
1	7	Karsten Warholm	Norway	48.01	Q
2	8	Matic Ian Guček	Slovenia	48.03	Q, NR
3	6	İsmail Nezir	Turkey	48.16	q, PB
4	9	Matej Baluch	Slovakia	49.19	
5	5	Joshua Faulds	Great Britain & N.I.	49.26	
6	2	Diogo Barrigana	Portugal	50.01	
7	4	Alessio Sommacal	Italy	50.12	
8	3	Antti Sainio	Finland	50.64	

=== Final ===
The final was held on 14 August 2026, at 20:40 in the evening.

Place	Lane	Athlete	Nation	Time	Notes
1st place, gold medalist(s)	6	Karsten Warholm	Norway	46.63	CR
2nd place, silver medalist(s)	7	Emil Agyekum	Germany	47.87	
3rd place, bronze medalist(s)	2	İsmail Nezir	Turkey	48.26	
4	7	Oskar Edlund	Sweden	48.36	
5	9	Owe Fischer-Breiholz	Germany	48.56	
6	3	Jesús David Delgado	Spain	48.66	
7	5	Matic Ian Guček	Slovenia	48.76	
8	4	Alessandro Sibilio	Italy	49.83	
