= 2023 World Athletics Championships – Men's 400 metres hurdles =

Men's 400 metres hurdles at the 2023 World Championships
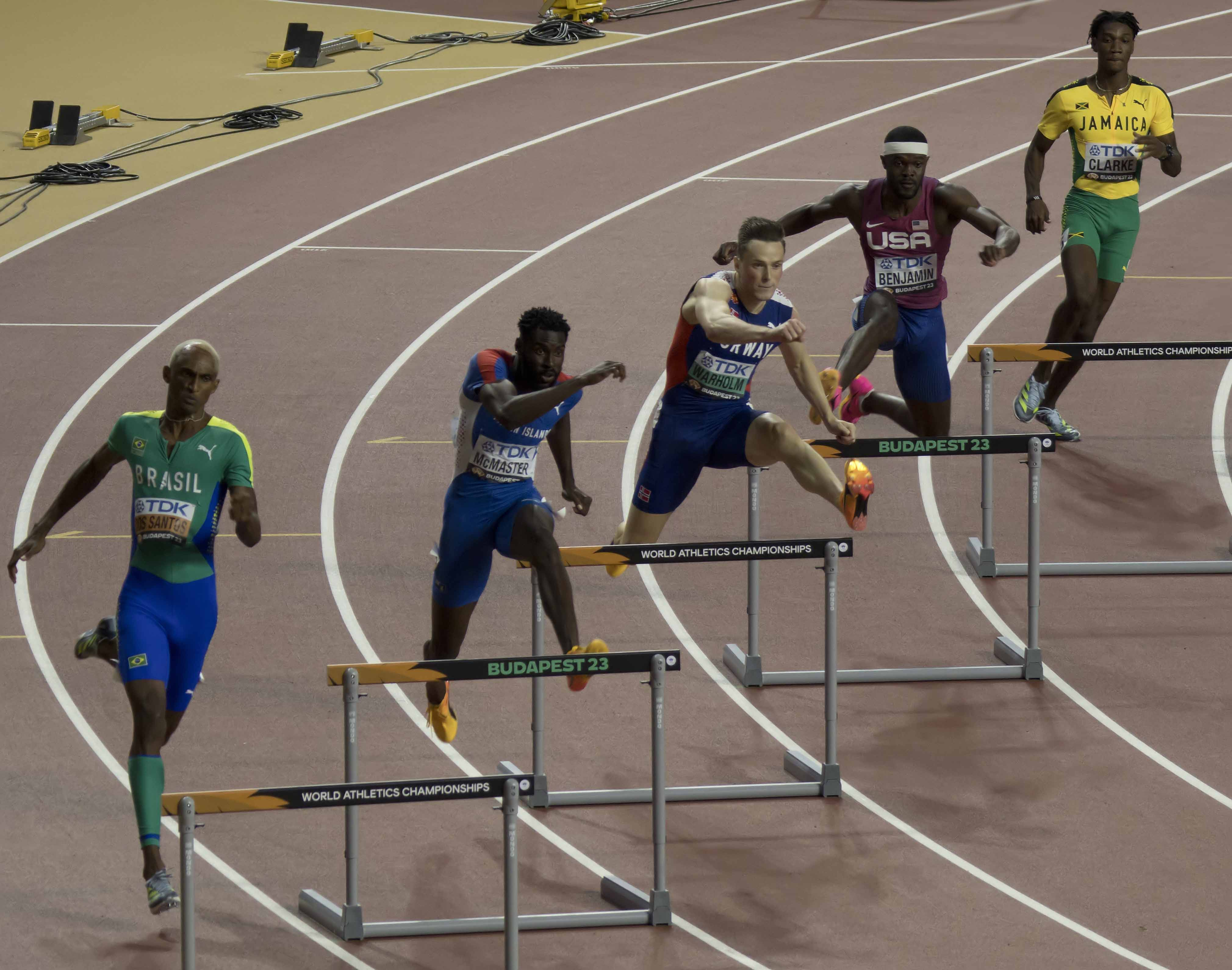
- The final underway.
- Venue: National Athletics Centre
- Dates: 20 August (heats); 21 August (semi-finals); 23 August (final)
- Competitors: 43 from 31 nations
- Winning time: 46.89

Medalists
gold medal	Karsten Warholm	Norway
silver medal	Kyron McMaster	British Virgin Islands
bronze medal	Rai Benjamin	United States

The men's 400 metres hurdles at the 2023 World Athletics Championships was held at the National Athletics Centre in Budapest, Hungary from 20 to 23 August 2023.

== Summary ==
World record holder #1 Karsten Warholm was back. With three time silver medalist #2 Rai Benjamin and defending champion #3 Alison dos Santos, the top three of all time were there. And don't forget #8 Kyron McMaster. During the semi-finals, 18 year old Roshawn Clarke got inspired trying to chase Warholm, and the result was a new World Junior Record, now called a U20 Record, and #13 of all time. Trevor Bassitt moved to #18 all time with his performance in the semis just to be a time qualifier behind Warholm and Clarke.

Warholm was assigned his favorite lane 7. Outside of him was McMaster in 8 and dos Santos in 9. With Benjamin in 6 and Clarke in 5, all the major players were on the outside of the track. As expected, Warholm took it out hard. Unexpectedly, Benjamin also took it out hard, marginally ahead of Warholm, and McMaster was right there with them. The three were virtually even at the halfway point, and then Warholm started to edge ahead. Down the home stretch, unlike previous meetings, Benjamin was not coming from behind, but instead was watching Warholm pulling away from him. And it was McMaster coming from behind to catch Benjamin before the line for silver. Warholm's winning time of 46.89 was the eighth time he has run under 47 seconds, a time that had only been achieved once before 2018. It was Warholm's third World Championship gold medal in this event.

== Records ==
Before the competition, records were as follows:

Record	Athlete & Nat.	Perf.	Location	Date
World record	Karsten Warholm (NOR)	45.94	Tokyo, Japan	3 August 2021
Championship record	Alison dos Santos (BRA)	46.29	Eugene, United States	19 July 2022
World Leading	Karsten Warholm (NOR)	46.51	Monte Carlo, Monaco	21 July 2023
African Record	Samuel Matete (ZAM)	47.10	Zürich, Switzerland	7 August 1991
Asian Record	Abderrahman Samba (QAT)	46.98	Paris, France	30 June 2018
North, Central American and Caribbean record	Rai Benjamin (USA)	46.17	Tokyo, Japan	3 August 2021
South American Record	Alison dos Santos (BRA)	46.29	Eugene, United States	19 July 2022
European Record	Karsten Warholm (NOR)	45.94	Tokyo, Japan	3 August 2021
Oceanian record	Rohan Robinson (AUS)	48.28	Atlanta, United States	31 July 1996

== Qualification standard ==
The standard to qualify automatically for entry was 48.70.

== Schedule ==
The event schedule, in local time (UTC+2), was as follows:

Date	Time	Round
20 August	11:25	Heats
21 August	19:33	Semi-finals
23 August	21:50	Final

== Results ==
=== Heats ===
The first four athletes in each heat (Q) and the next four fastest (q) qualified to the semi-finals.

Rank	Heat	Name	Nationality	Time	Notes
1	1	Alison dos Santos	Brazil	48.12	Q
2	1	Ludvy Vaillant	France	48.27	Q
3	4	Joshua Abuaku	Germany	48.32	Q, PB
4	5	Rai Benjamin	United States	48.35	Q
5	4	CJ Allen	United States	48.36	Q
6	4	Roshawn Clarke	Jamaica	48.39	Q
7	2	Kyron McMaster	British Virgin Islands	48.47	Q
8	4	Ezekiel Nathaniel	Nigeria	48.47	Q, SB
9	2	Rasmus Mägi	Estonia	48.58	Q
10	5	Jaheel Hyde	Jamaica	48.63	Q
11	3	Wilfried Happio	France	48.63	Q
12	5	Kazuki Kurokawa	Japan	48.71	Q, SB
13	4	Julien Watrin	Belgium	48.72	q, SB
14	2	Trevor Bassitt	United States	48.73	Q
15	5	Gerald Drummond	Costa Rica	48.73	Q
16	3	Karsten Warholm	Norway	48.76	Q
17	5	Yasmani Copello	Turkey	48.92	q
18	5	Emil Agyekum	Germany	49.00	q
19	4	Mario Lambrughi	Italy	49.05	q, SB
20	2	Wiseman Were Mukhobe	Kenya	49.10	Q
21	1	Julien Bonvin	Switzerland	49.19	Q, SB
22	1	Xie Zhiyu	China	49.25	Q
23	2	Sergio Fernández	Spain	49.26	
24	4	Vít Müller	Czech Republic	49.37	
25	1	Matic Ian Gucek	Slovenia	49.40	SB
26	1	Constantin Preis	Germany	49.45	
27	3	Bassem Hemeida	Qatar	49.50	Q
28	3	Alessandro Sibilio	Italy	49.50	Q
29	5	Shakeem Hall-Smith	Bahamas	49.61	
30	3	Dany Brand	Switzerland	49.69	
31	2	Ismail Nezir	Turkey	49.92	
32	3	Pablo Andrés Ibáñez	El Salvador	50.01	
33	4	Yusaku Kodama	Japan	50.18	
34	2	Eric Cray	Philippines	50.27	
35	5	Árpád Bánóczy	Hungary	50.31	PB
36	3	Santhosh Kumar Tamilarasan	India	50.46	
37	5	Jun Jie Calvin Quek	Singapore	50.53	
38	3	Marc Anthony Ibrahim	Lebanon	50.62	
39	3	Malique Smith	U.S. Virgin Islands	50.86	
40	2	Takayuki Kishimoto	Japan	50.90	
41	2	Andrea Ercolani Volta	San Marino	52.69	
	1	Abdelmalik Lahoulou	Algeria	DNF	
	1	Assinie Wilson	Jamaica	DNF	

=== Semi-finals ===
The first 2 athletes in each heat (Q) and the next 2 fastest (q) qualified to the final.

Rank	Heat	Name	Nationality	Time	Notes
1	3	Karsten Warholm	Norway	47.09	Q
2	2	Rai Benjamin	United States	47.24	Q
3	3	Roshawn Clarke	Jamaica	47.34	Q, WU20R, NR
4	3	Trevor Bassitt	United States	47.38	q, PB
5	2	Alison dos Santos	Brazil	47.38	Q, SB
6	1	Kyron McMaster	British Virgin Islands	47.72	Q
7	1	Rasmus Mägi	Estonia	48.30	Q
8	3	Joshua Abuaku	Germany	48.39	q
9	3	Alessandro Sibilio	Italy	48.43	
10	1	CJ Allen	United States	48.44	
11	2	Ludvy Vaillant	France	48.48	
12	1	Jaheel Hyde	Jamaica	48.49	
13	2	Kazuki Kurokawa	Japan	48.58	PB
14	3	Yasmani Copello	Turkey	48.66	SB
15	2	Emil Agyekum	Germany	48.71	PB
16	3	Wilfried Happio	France	48.83	
17	1	Julien Watrin	Belgium	48.94	
18	1	Ezekiel Nathaniel	Nigeria	49.22	
19	3	Gerald Drummond	Costa Rica	49.31	
20	2	Wiseman Were Mukhobe	Kenya	49.40	
21	1	Bassem Hemeida	Qatar	49.50	
22	2	Xie Zhiyu	China	49.57	
23	2	Julien Bonvin	Switzerland	49.75	
24	1	Mario Lambrughi	Italy	DQ	TR16.8

=== Final ===
The final was started on 23 August at 21:50.

Rank	Lane	Name	Nationality	Time	Notes
1st place, gold medalist(s)	7	Karsten Warholm	Norway	46.89	
2nd place, silver medalist(s)	8	Kyron McMaster	British Virgin Islands	47.34	
3rd place, bronze medalist(s)	6	Rai Benjamin	United States	47.56	
4	5	Roshawn Clarke	Jamaica	48.07	
5	9	Alison dos Santos	Brazil	48.10	
6	3	Trevor Bassitt	United States	48.22	
7	4	Rasmus Mägi	Estonia	48.33	
8	2	Joshua Abuaku	Germany	48.53	
