= Julien Bonvin =

Swiss hurdler and sprinter (born 1999)

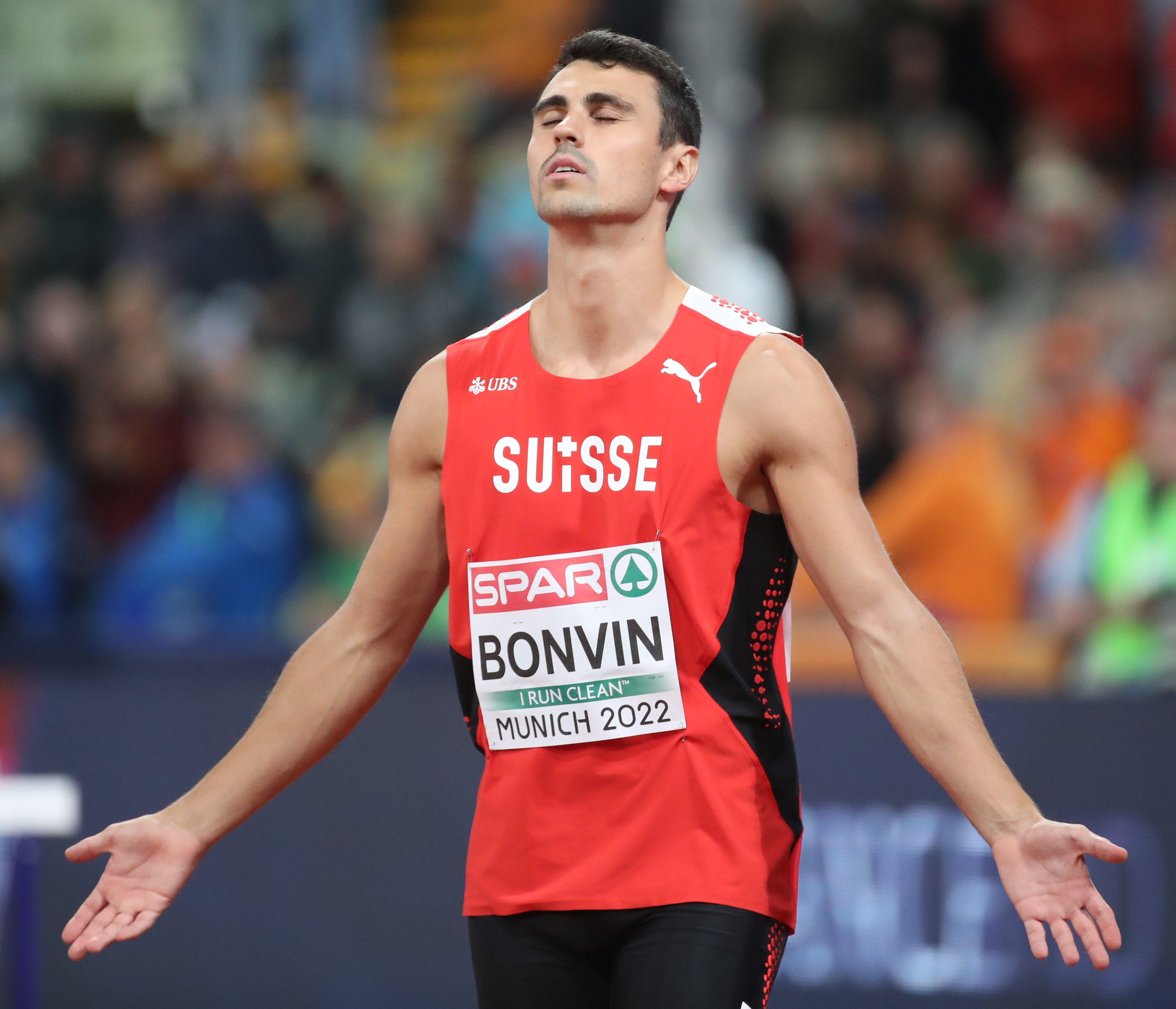
- Bonvin at the 2022 European Championships

Personal information
- Born: 10 January 1999 (age 27) Sierre, Valais, Switzerland
- Education: University of Lausanne

Sport
- Country: Switzerland
- Sport: Athletics
- Events: 200 metres, 400 metres hurdles
- Club: CA Sierre
- Coached by: Julien Quennoz

Achievements and titles
- Personal best: 400 m hurdles: 49.10 (Munich 2021)

Julien Bonvin (born 10 January 1999) is a Swiss sprinter who specialises in the 400 metres hurdles. He has been the national champion in the 400 metres hurdles ever since 2021, earning the title consecutively three times in a row. He is also the 2023 Swiss champion for the indoor 200 metres.

== Early life and career ==
Julien Bonvin was born on 10 January 1999 in Sierre, Switzerland. His passion for athletics developed at the age of 14. Immediately, he fell in love with the 400 metres hurdles.

=== 2016 ===
He won his first national title, as a junior, at the Swiss U18 Championships in September 2016. He competed in the 300 metres hurdles and came in first place.

Also, he made his international debut at the 2016 European U18 Championships in Tbilisi, Georgia and finished in fifth place during the semi-finals. However, he was eliminated before he could advance to the final round.

=== 2017–2019 ===
He claimed additional national titles in the 400 metres hurdles at the Swiss U20 Championships in 2017 and 2018. He kept up his winning streak for another year at the 2019 Swiss U23 Championships, where he finished in first place in the 400 metres hurdles.

=== 2021 ===
He participated in the 2021 U23 Championships in Tallinn, Estonia. He finished in fifth place and reached a new personal best of 49.56 in the 400 metres hurdles. However, the 4 × 400 m relay group that he was a part of did not finish in the event. He ran the first leg during the final heat, but as the race neared the end, the Dutch runner pushed his British competitor which caused him to trip the Swiss athlete as a result.

=== 2022 ===
He attended the 2022 World Championships in Eugene, OR, United States. However, he was eliminated during the preliminary rounds of the third heat after he finished in sixth place. The following month, in August, he went to the 2022 European Championships in Munich, Germany and finished in seventh place.

=== 2023 ===
He was selected, alongside 38 others, to represent Switzerland at the 2023 World Championships in Budapest, Hungary. Although he finished in third place during the preliminary rounds, thus qualifying for the semi-finals, he was eliminated in the second heat before he could advance to the final round.

== Achievements ==
Information from his World Athletics profile unless otherwise noted.

=== Personal bests ===
- 60 metres indoor — (Magglingen 2023)

- 100 metres — 11.09 (-2.9 m/s, Sion 2022)
- 200 metres — 21.31 (Bern 2021)
  - 200 metres indoor – 21.23 (St. Gallen 2023)
- 400 metres hurdles — 49.10 (Munich 2022)
  - 400 metres indoor – 46.58 (Magglingen 2022)

=== International competitions ===
Year	Competition	Venue	Position	Event	Time	Notes
Representing Switzerland
2016	European U18 Championships	Tbilisi, Georgia	5th (sf)	400 m hurdles	55.27	Semi-final 1
2017	European U20 Championships	Grosseto, Italy	6th (h)	400 m hurdles	53.75	Heat 2
2017	European U20 Championships	Grosseto, Italy	6th	4 × 400 m relay	3:11.67	
2018	World U20 Championships	Tampere, Finland	16th (sf)	400 m hurdles	51.83	
2018	World U20 Championships	Tampere, Finland	9th (h)	4 × 400 m relay	3:09.48	NU20R
2019	European U23 Championships	Gävle, Sweden	20th (h)	400 m hurdles	52.53	
2021	European Team Championships First League	Cluj-Napoca, Romania	6th	400 m hurdles	51.39	
2021	European U23 Championships	Tallinn, Estonia	5th	400 m hurdles	49.56	PB SB
2021	European U23 Championships	Tallinn, Estonia	— (f)	4 × 400 m relay	DNF	
2022	World Championships	Eugene, United States	28th (h)	400 m hurdles	50.40	
2022	European Championships	Munich, Germany	7th	400 m hurdles	50.24	
2023	World Championships	Budapest, Hungary	23rd (sf)	400 m hurdles	49.75	
2024	European Championships	Rome, Italy	20th (sf)	400 m hurdles	49.95	
2024	European Championships	Rome, Italy	–	4 × 400 m relay	DQ	
2024	Olympic Games	Paris, France	11th (rep)	400 m hurdles	49.08	
2025	World Championships	Tokyo, Japan	31st (h)	400 m hurdles	49.53	
2026	European Championships	Birmingham, United Kingdom	17th (h)	400 m hurdles	50.49	

=== National titles ===
- Swiss Championships (3)
  - 400 m hurdles: 2021, 2022, 2023
- Swiss Indoor Championships (2)
  - 200 metres: 2023
  - 400 metres: 2022
- Swiss U23 Championships
  - 400 m hurdles: 2019
- Swiss U20 Championships
  - 400 m hurdles: 2017, 2018
- Swiss U18 Championships
  - 300 m hurdles: 2016

== See also ==
- List of Swiss records in athletics
