= Athletics at the 2024 Summer Olympics – Men's 400 metres hurdles =

Men's 400 metres hurdles at the Games of the XXXIII Olympiad
- Venue: Stade de France, Paris, France
- Dates: 5 August 2024 (round 1); 6 August 2024 (repechage round); 7 August 2024 (semi-finals); 9 August 2024 (final)
- Competitors: 39
- Winning time: 46.46

Medalists
1st place, gold medalist(s)		Rai Benjamin	United States
2nd place, silver medalist(s)		Karsten Warholm	Norway
3rd place, bronze medalist(s)		Alison dos Santos	Brazil

The men's 400 metres hurdles at the 2024 Summer Olympics was held in four rounds at the Stade de France in Paris, France, from 5 to 9 August 2024. This was 28th time that the men's 400 metres hurdles was contested at the Summer Olympics. A total of 40 athletes were able to qualify for the event by entry standard or ranking.

== Summary ==
In the build up to the Games, World Athletics touted reigning Olympic champion and world record holder Karsten Warholm, 2020 Olympic silver medallist and world leader Rai Benjamin, and 2022 world champion Alison Dos Santos for a battle for the gold. Other athletes seen as medal contenders included 2023 world silver medallist Kyron McMaster, 2023 world fourth-placer Roshawn Clarke and fellow Jamaican Malik James-King.

Rain on the day of the final may have precluded the possibility of a world record. In the final, Warholm went out to the fastest start, reaching the third hurdle first in 12.73 s. Clarke and Benjamin following in second (12.77 s). By the halfway mark at the fifth hurdle, dos Santos has passed Clement Ducos for the third placed spot. Benjamin took the lead over the eighth hurdle, with Warholm in second and dos Santos in third. They maintained their positions up until the line.

== Background ==
The men's 400 m hurdles has been present on the Olympic athletics programme since 1900, with a sole gap at the 1912 Summer Olympics.

Global records before the 2024 Summer Olympics
Record	Athlete (Nation)	Time (s)	Location	Date
World record	Karsten Warholm (NOR)	45.94	Tokyo, Japan	3 August 2021
Olympic record	Karsten Warholm (NOR)	45.94	Tokyo, Japan	3 August 2021
World leading	Rai Benjamin (USA)	46.46	Eugene, United States	30 June 2024

Area records before the 2024 Summer Olympics
Area Record	Athlete (Nation)	Time (s)
Africa (records)	Samuel Matete (ZAM)	47.10
Asia (records)	Abderrahman Samba (QAT)	46.98
Europe (records)	Karsten Warholm (NOR)	45.94 WR
North, Central America and Caribbean (records)	Rai Benjamin (USA)	46.17
Oceania (records)	Rohan Robinson (AUS)	48.28
South America (records)	Alison dos Santos (BRA)	46.29

== Qualification ==
For the men's 400 metres hurdles event, the qualification period was between 1 July 2023 and 30 June 2024. Forty athletes were able to qualify for the event, with a maximum of three athletes per nation, by running the entry standard of 48.70 seconds or faster or by their World Athletics Ranking for this event.

== Results ==
=== Round 1 ===
Round 1 was held on 5 August, starting at 10:05 (UTC+2) in the morning.

Qualification Rules: First 3 in each heat (Q) and the next 3 fastest (q) advance to the semifinals. All others advance to Repechage round (except DNS, DNF, DQ).

==== Heat 1 ====
Rank	Lane	Athlete	Nation	Reaction	Time	Notes
1	7	Rai Benjamin	United States	0.190	48.82	Q
2	6	Jaheel Hyde	Jamaica	0.175	49.08	Q
3	2	Kyron McMaster	British Virgin Islands	0.166	49.24	Q
4	4	Carl Bengtström	Sweden	0.172	49.34	
5	5	Bassem Hemeida	Qatar	0.141	49.82	SB
6	8	Daiki Ogawa	Japan	0.174	50.21	
7	3	Matic Ian Guček	Slovenia	0.147	50.30	

==== Heat 2 ====
Rank	Lane	Athlete	Nation	Reaction	Time	Notes
1	5	Karsten Warholm	Norway	0.148	47.57	Q
2	9	Clément Ducos	France	0.157	47.69	Q, PB
3	7	Abderrahman Samba	Qatar	0.182	48.35	Q
4	8	Yeral Nuñez	Dominican Republic	0.187	48.67	
5	4	Trevor Bassitt	United States	0.185	49.38	
6	2	Vít Müller	Czech Republic	0.150	49.44	
7	6	Oskar Edlund	Sweden	0.188	49.74	
8	3	Xie Zhiyu	China	0.191	49.90	

==== Heat 3 ====
Rank	Lane	Athlete	Nation	Reaction	Time	Notes
1	5	Rasmus Mägi	Estonia	0.196	48.62	Q
2	6	CJ Allen	United States	0.144	48.64	Q
3	2	Alison dos Santos	Brazil	0.165	48.75	Q
4	9	Emil Agyekum	Germany	0.207	49.38	
5	3	Victor Ntweng	Botswana	0.138	49.59	
6	8	Julien Bonvin	Switzerland	0.167	49.82	
7	7	Kaito Tsutsue	Japan	0.149	50.50	
8	4	Yasmani Copello	Turkey	0.224	50.72	

==== Heat 4 ====
Rank	Lane	Athlete	Nation	Reaction	Time	Notes
1	8	Roshawn Clarke	Jamaica	0.191	48.17	Q
2	3	Ezekiel Nathaniel	Nigeria	0.181	48.38	Q
3	7	Wilfried Happio	France	0.152	48.42	Q
4	4	Alessandro Sibilio	Italy	0.157	48.43	q
5	5	Wiseman Were Mukhobe	Kenya	0.198	48.58	q
6	9	Nick Smidt	Netherlands	0.168	48.64	q, SB
7	6	Gerald Drummond	Costa Rica	0.213	48.80	
8	2	Constantin Preis	Germany	0.221	49.99	

==== Heat 5 ====
Rank	Lane	Athlete	Nation	Reaction	Time	Notes
1	2	Malik James-King	Jamaica	0.150	48.21	Q
2	6	Matheus Lima	Brazil	0.180	48.90	Q, SB
3	9	Alastair Chalmers	Great Britain	0.179	48.98	Q
4	7	Joshua Abuaku	Germany	0.151	49.00	
5	3	Berke Akçam	Turkey	0.143	49.48	
6	4	Ken Toyoda	Japan	0.136	53.62	
	8	Ismail Doudai Abakar	Qatar	0.177	DNF	
	5	Peng Ming-yang	Chinese Taipei	0.209	DNF	

=== Repechage round ===
The repechage round was held on 6 August, starting at 12:00 (UTC+2) in the afternoon.

==== Heat 1 ====
Rank	Lane	Athlete	Nation	Reaction	Time	Notes
1	6	Trevor Bassitt	United States	0.177	48.64	Q
2	4	Emil Agyekum	Germany	0.194	48.67	Q
3	7	Vít Müller	Czech Republic	0.157	48.96	
4	8	Oskar Edlund	Sweden	0.168	48.99	
5	3	Daiki Ogawa	Japan	0.136	49.25	
6	2	Bassem Hemeida	Qatar	0.146	49.64	SB
	5	Yasmani Copello	Turkey		DNS	

==== Heat 2 ====
Rank	Lane	Athlete	Nation	Reaction	Time	Notes
1	8	Carl Bengtström	Sweden	0.171	48.63	Q
2	4	Gerald Drummond	Costa Rica	0.216	48.78	Q
3	5	Victor Ntweng	Botswana	0.168	48.88	
4	7	Matic Ian Guček	Slovenia	0.146	49.06	
5	6	Constantin Preis	Germany	0.218	51.02	
	3	Kaito Tsutsue	Japan		DNS	

==== Heat 3 ====
Rank	Lane	Athlete	Nation	Reaction	Time	Notes
1	5	Berke Akçam	Turkey	0.146	48.72	Q
2	6	Joshua Abuaku	Germany	0.159	48.87	Q, SB
3	3	Julien Bonvin	Switzerland	0.165	49.08	
4	8	Xie Zhiyu	China	0.224	49.59	
5	7	Yeral Nuñez	Dominican Republic	0.204	53.68	
	4	Ken Toyoda	Japan		DNS	

=== Semi-finals ===
The semi-finals were held on 7 August, starting at 19:35 (UTC+2) in the evening.

==== Semifinal 1 ====
Rank	Lane	Athlete	Nation	Time	Notes
1	7	Karsten Warholm	Norway	47.67	Q
2	6	Clément Ducos	France	47.85	Q
3	9	Alison dos Santos	Brazil	47.95	q
4	2	Trevor Bassitt	United States	48.29	
5	5	Ezekiel Nathaniel	Nigeria	48.65	
6	4	Nick Smidt	Netherlands	49.61	
7	8	Jaheel Hyde	Jamaica	50.03	
8	3	Joshua Abuaku	Germany	50.19	

==== Semifinal 2 ====
Rank	Lane	Athlete	Nation	Time	Notes
1	4	Kyron McMaster	British Virgin Islands	48.15	Q
2	7	Rasmus Mägi	Estonia	48.16	Q
3	5	Abderrahman Samba	Qatar	48.20	q
4	8	CJ Allen	United States	48.44	
5	3	Emil Agyekum	Germany	48.78	
6	9	Alessandro Sibilio	Italy	48.79	
7	6	Malik James-King	Jamaica	48.85	
8	2	Berke Akçam	Turkey	49.12	

==== Semifinal 3 ====
Rank	Lane	Athlete	Nation	Time	Notes
1	5	Rai Benjamin	United States	47.85	Q
2	8	Roshawn Clarke	Jamaica	48.34	Q
3	7	Wilfried Happio	France	48.66	
4	6	Matheus Lima	Brazil	49.08	
5	4	Wiseman Mukhobe	Kenya	49.22	
6	3	Carl Bengtström	Sweden	49.56	
7	2	Gerald Drummond	Costa Rica	49.68	
8	9	Alastair Chalmers	Great Britain	56.52	

=== Final ===
The final was held on 9 August, starting at 21:45 (UTC+2) in the evening.

Rank	Lane	Athlete	Nation	Time	Notes
1st place, gold medalist(s)	8	Rai Benjamin	United States	46.46	=SB
2nd place, silver medalist(s)	7	Karsten Warholm	Norway	47.06	
3rd place, bronze medalist(s)	3	Alison dos Santos	Brazil	47.26	
4	5	Clément Ducos	France	47.76	
5	6	Kyron McMaster	British Virgin Islands	47.79	SB
6	2	Abderrahman Samba	Qatar	47.98	
7	4	Rasmus Mägi	Estonia	52.53	
-	9	Roshawn Clarke	Jamaica	DNF	
