= 2022 European Athletics Championships – Men's 400 metres hurdles =

Men's 400 metres hurdles at the 2022 European Athletics Championships
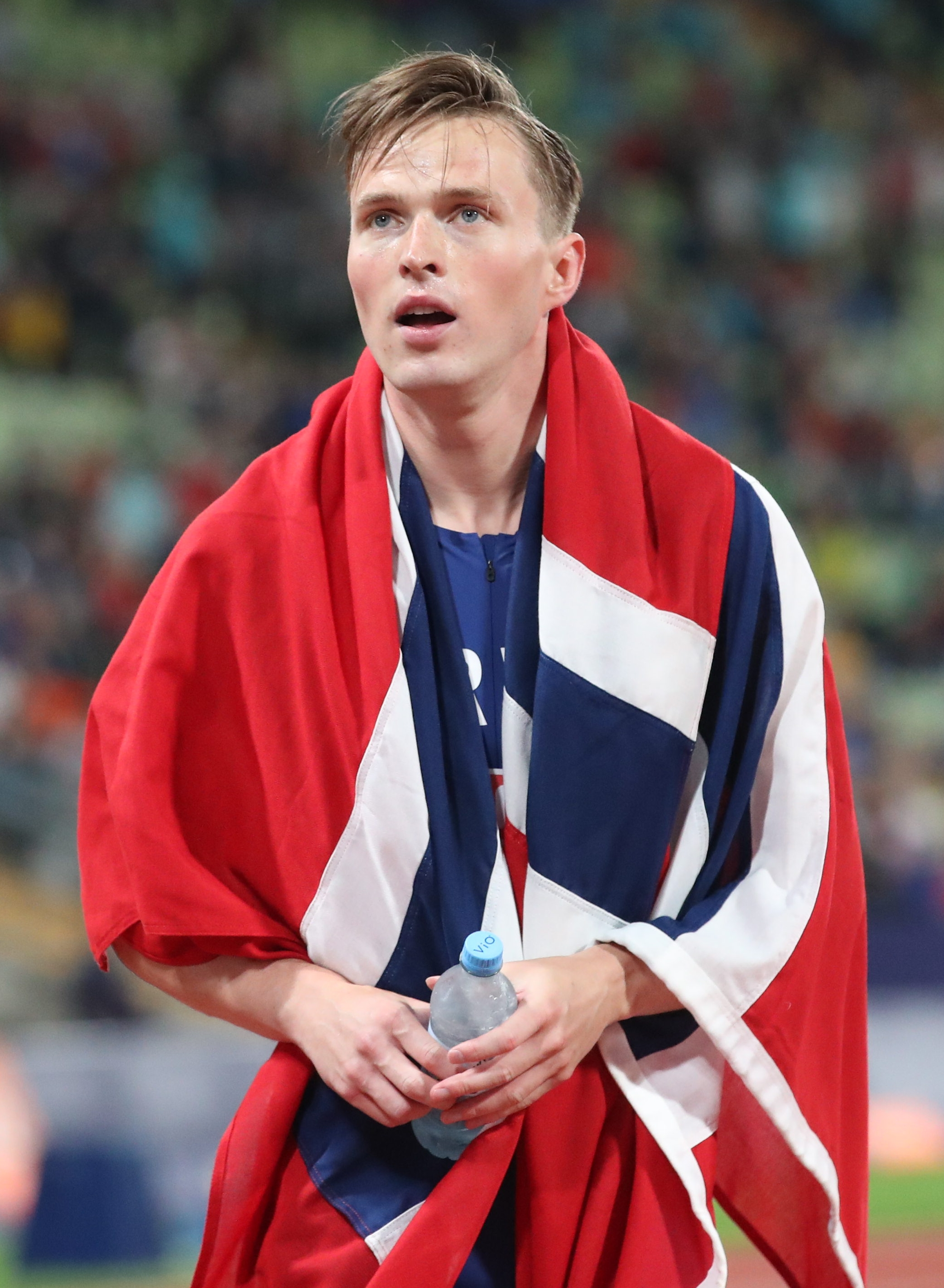
- Venue: Olympiastadion
- Location: Munich
- Dates: 17 August (round 1); 18 August (semifinals); 19 August (final)
- Competitors: 36 from 19 nations
- Winning time: 47.12 CR

Medalists
| gold medal | Karsten Warholm | Norway |
| silver medal | Wilfried Happio | France |
| bronze medal | Yasmani Copello | Turkey |

The men's 400 metres hurdles at the 2022 European Athletics Championships took place at the Olympiastadion on 17, 18 and 19 August.

== Records ==
Standing records prior to the 2022 European Athletics Championships
| World record | Karsten Warholm (NOR) | 45.94 | Tokyo, Japan | 3 August 2021 |
| European record | Karsten Warholm (NOR) | 45.94 | Tokyo, Japan | 3 August 2021 |
| Championship record | Harald Schmid (FRG) | 47.48 | Athina, Greece | 8 September 1982 |
| World Leading | Alison dos Santos (BRA) | 46.29 | Eugene, Oregon, United States | 19 July 2022 |
| Europe Leading | Wilfried Happio (FRA) | 47.41 | Eugene, Oregon, United States | 19 July 2022 |

== Schedule ==
| Date | Time | Round |
|---|---|---|
| 17 August 2022 | 11:05 | Round 1 |
| 18 August 2022 | 11:25 | Semifinals |
| 19 August 2022 | 22:00 | Final |

All times are local times (UTC+2)

== Results ==
=== Round 1 ===
First 3 in each heat (Q) and the next 2 fastest (q) advanced to the Semifinals.The 10 highest ranked athletes received a bye into the semifinals

| Rank | Heat | Lane | Name | Nationality | Time | Note |
|---|---|---|---|---|---|---|
| 1 | 1 | 7 | Victor Coroller | France | 49.35 | Q |
| 2 | 1 | 6 | Jacob Paul | Great Britain | 49.40 | Q, PB |
| 3 | 1 | 5 | Julien Bonvin | Switzerland | 49.41 | Q |
| 4 | 2 | 2 | Thomas Barr | Ireland | 49.49 | Q |
| 5 | 2 | 3 | Ramsey Angela | Netherlands | 49.51 | Q |
| 6 | 4 | 7 | Constantin Preis | Germany | 49.63 | Q, SB |
| 7 | 1 | 2 | Vít Müller | Czech Republic | 49.86 | q |
| 8 | 4 | 6 | Nick Smidt | Netherlands | 50.06 | Q |
| 9 | 4 | 2 | Seamus Derbyshire | Great Britain | 50.08 | Q |
| 10 | 4 | 3 | Martin Tuček | Czech Republic | 50.09 | q |
| 11 | 4 | 8 | Krzysztof Hołub | Poland | 50.12 | =PB |
| 12 | 3 | 8 | Mario Lambrughi | Italy | 50.27 | Q |
| 13 | 4 | 4 | Dany Brand | Switzerland | 50.30 | |
| 14 | 2 | 4 | Matej Baluch | Slovakia | 50.49 | Q |
| 15 | 3 | 7 | Jesús David Delgado | Spain | 50.61 | Q |
| 16 | 2 | 6 | Sebastian Urbaniak | Poland | 50.69 | |
| 17 | 2 | 5 | Aleix Porras | Spain | 50.77 | |
| 18 | 1 | 4 | Martin Kučera | Slovakia | 50.82 | |
| 19 | 3 | 5 | Dries Van Nieuwenhove | Belgium | 50.85 | Q |
| 20 | 3 | 2 | Niklas Strohmayer-Dangl | Austria | 51.21 | |
| 21 | 3 | 6 | Joshua Faulds | Great Britain | 51.21 | |
| 22 | 2 | 7 | Nahom Yirga | Switzerland | 51.55 | |
| 23 | 3 | 3 | Jakub Olejniczak | Poland | 51.77 | |
| 24 | 1 | 3 | Giacomo Bertoncelli | Italy | 51.86 | |
| 25 | 4 | 5 | Andrea Ercolani Volta | San Marino | 52.59 | SB |
| 26 | 3 | 4 | Tuomas Lehtonen | Finland | 52.75 | |

=== Semifinals ===
First 2 in each semifinal (Q) and the next 2 fastest (q) advance to the Final.

| Rank | Heat | Lane | Name | Nationality | Time | Note |
|---|---|---|---|---|---|---|
| 1 | 2 | 6 | Karsten Warholm | Norway | 48.38 | Q |
| 2 | 2 | 4 | Ludvy Vaillant | France | 48.52 | Q, SB |
| 3 | 2 | 5 | Julien Watrin | Belgium | 48.81 | q, PB |
| 4 | 1 | 6 | Wilfried Happio | France | 48.89 | Q |
| 5 | 1 | 4 | Joshua Abuaku | Germany | 49.05 | Q |
| 6 | 2 | 3 | Julien Bonvin | Switzerland | 49.10 | q, PB |
| 7 | 1 | 6 | Thomas Barr | Ireland | 49.30 | |
| 8 | 3 | 3 | Yasmani Copello | Turkey | 49.34 | Q |
| 9 | 3 | 5 | Victor Coroller | France | 49.46 | Q |
| 10 | 2 | 3 | Jacob Paul | Great Britain | 49.48 | |
| 11 | 2 | 7 | Mario Lambrughi | Italy | 49.50 | |
| 11 | 3 | 5 | José Reynaldo Bencosme de Leon | Italy | 49.50 | |
| 13 | 3 | 1 | Carl Bengström | Sweden | 49.52 | |
| 14 | 3 | 8 | Constantin Preis | Germany | 49.55 | SB |
| 15 | 1 | 8 | Seamus Derbyshire | Great Britain | 49.75 | |
| 16 | 1 | 7 | İsmail Nezir | Turkey | 49.78 | |
| 17 | 3 | 1 | Vít Müller | Czech Republic | 49.78 | |
| 18 | 3 | 1 | Matic Ian Guček | Slovenia | 49.93 | |
| 19 | 3 | 2 | Ramsey Angela | Netherlands | 49.99 | |
| 20 | 1 | 2 | Nick Smidt | Netherlands | 50.29 | |
| 21 | 2 | 4 | Martin Tuček | Czech Republic | 50.32 | |
| 22 | 2 | 7 | Jesús David Delgado | Spain | 50.32 | |
| 23 | 1 | 2 | Matej Baluch | Slovakia | 50.93 | |
| 24 | 1 | 8 | Dries Van Nieuwenhove | Belgium | 51.15 | |

=== Final ===
| Rank | Lane | Name | Nationality | Time | Note |
|---|---|---|---|---|---|
| 1st place, gold medalist(s) | 6 | Karsten Warholm | Norway | 47.12 | CR |
| 2nd place, silver medalist(s) | 3 | Wilfried Happio | France | 48.56 | |
| 3rd place, bronze medalist(s) | 6 | Yasmani Copello | Turkey | 48.78 | |
| 4 | 5 | Ludvy Vaillant | France | 48.79 | |
| 5 | 7 | Joshua Abuaku | Germany | 48.79 | PB |
| 6 | 2 | Julien Watrin | Belgium | 48.98 | |
| 7 | 1 | Julien Bonvin | Switzerland | 50.24 | |
| 8 | 8 | Victor Coroller | France | 50.46 | |
