= Ramsey Angela =

Dutch sprinter (born 1999)

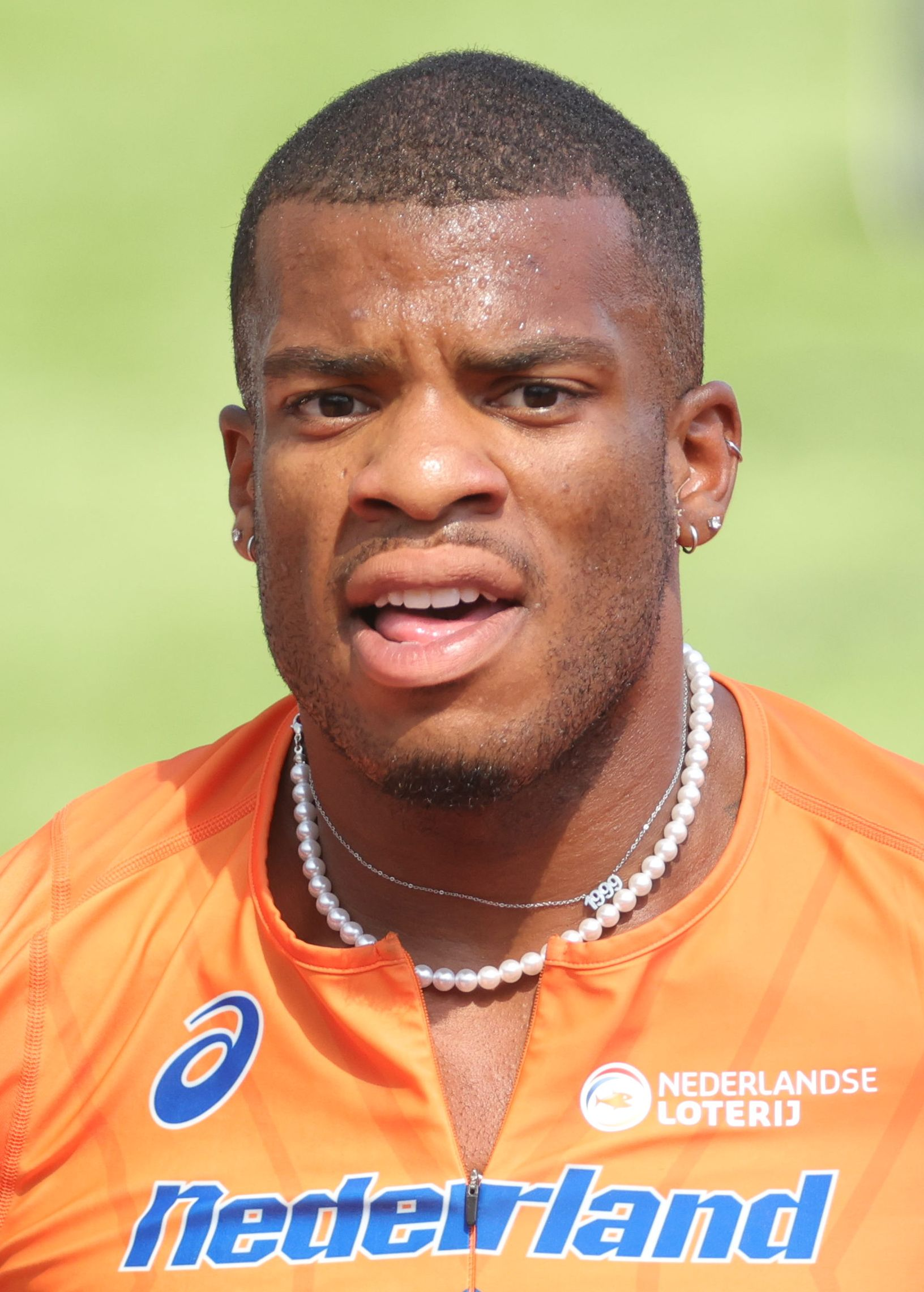
- Angela at the 2022 European Athletics Championships

Personal information
- Born: 6 November 1999 (age 26) Capelle aan den IJssel, Netherlands
- Height: 1.77 m (5 ft 10 in)

Sport
- Country: Netherlands
- Sport: Athletics
- Events: 400 metres, 400 m hurdles
- Club: PAC Rotterdam
- Coached by: Laurent Meuwly
Medal record
Men's athletics
Representing Netherlands
Olympic Games
Silver medal – second place	2020 Tokyo	4 × 400 m relay
World Relays
Gold medal – first place	2021 Chorzów	4 × 400 m relay
European Indoor Championships
Gold medal – first place	2021 Toruń	4 × 400 m relay
Bronze medal – third place	2023 Istanbul	4 × 400 m relay
European U23 Championships
Bronze medal – third place	2021 Tallinn	400 m hurdles

Ramsey Angela (born 6 November 1999) is a Dutch sprinter specialising in the 400 metres and 400 metres hurdles. He won the bronze medal in the 400 m hurdles at the 2021 European Under-23 Championships. Angela earned four major medals as part of Dutch men's 4 × 400 m relays, including silver at the 2020 Tokyo Olympics.

He won three Dutch national titles (400 m hurdles).

== Career ==
Angela comes from Rotterdam and represents PAC Rotterdam.

With the Dutch men's team he became European Champion in the 4 × 400 m relay at the 2021 European Indoor Championships held in Toruń, Poland.

He is openly gay.

== Statistics ==
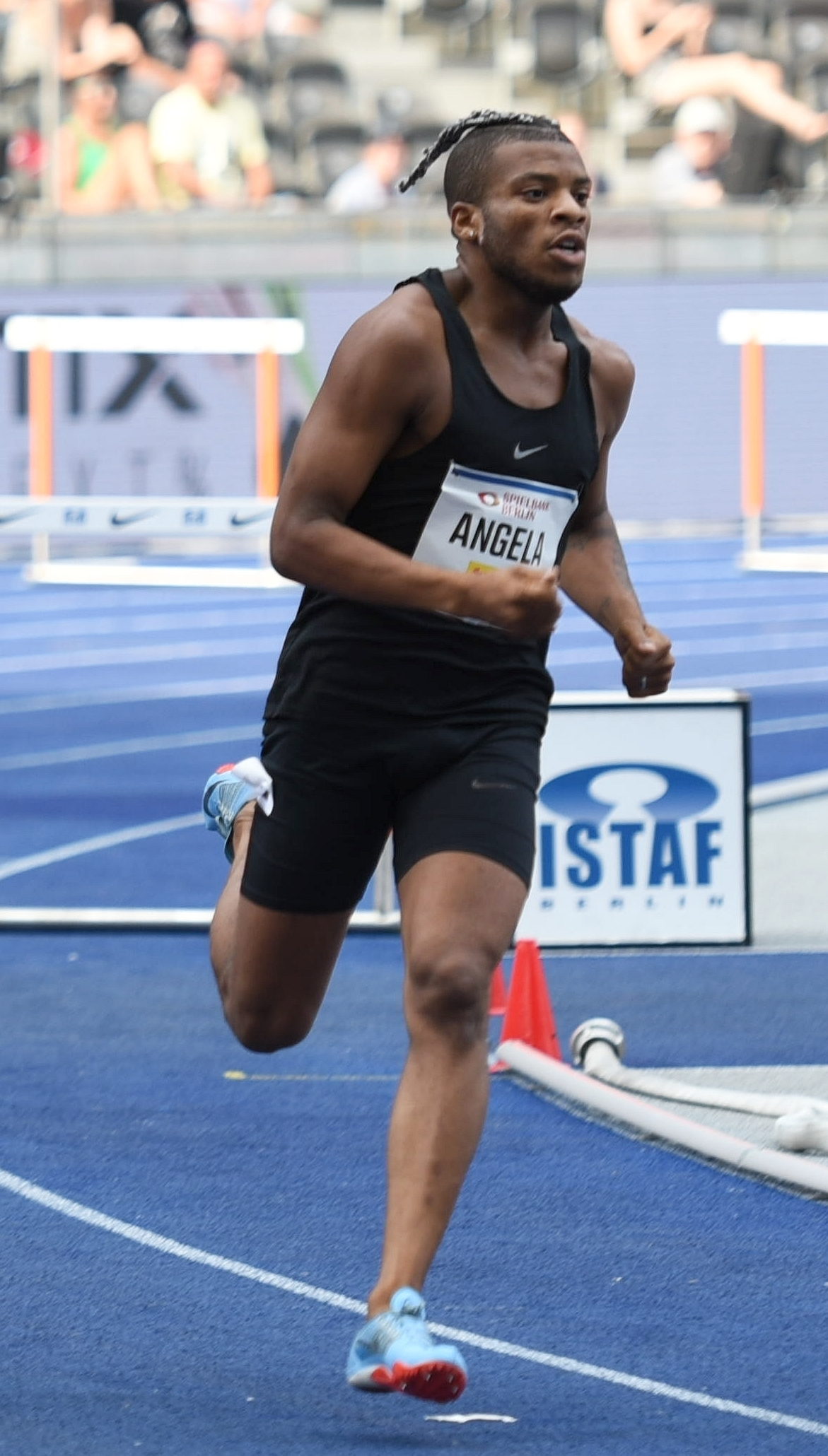
Angela races at the ISTAF Berlin meeting in 2019.

=== International competitions ===
Representing the Netherlands
Year	Competition	Venue	Position	Event	Time
2017	European U20 Championships	Grosseto, Italy	– (h)	400 m hurdles	DNF
2018	World U20 Championships	Tampere, Finland	18th (sf)	400 m hurdles	51.99
2018	European Championships	Berlin, Germany	9th (h)	4 × 400 m relay	3:04.93
2019	World Relays	Yokohama, Japan	10th (h)	4 × 400 m relay	3:04.30^{1}
2019	European U23 Championships	Gävle, Sweden	7th	400 m hurdles	50.51
2021	European Indoor Championships	Toruń, Poland	1st	4 × 400 m relay	3:06.06 EL NR
2021	World Relays	Chorzów, Poland	1st	4 × 400 m relay	3:03.45
2021	European Team Championships 1st League	Cluj-Napoca, Romania	2nd	4 × 400 m relay	3:02.49
2021	European U23 Championships	Tallinn, Estonia	3rd	400 m hurdles	49.07 PB
2021	European U23 Championships	Tallinn, Estonia	– (f)	4 × 400 m relay	DQ
2021	Olympic Games	Tokyo, Japan	2nd	4 × 400 m relay	2:57.18 NR
2021	Olympic Games	Tokyo, Japan	4th	4 × 400 m mixed	3:10.36 NR
2022	World Championships	Eugene, OR, United States	17th (sf)	400 m hurdles	49.77
2022	World Championships	Eugene, OR, United States	9th (h)	4 × 400 m relay	3:03.14 SB
2022	European Championships	Munich, Germany	19th (sf)	400 m hurdles	49.99
2022	European Championships	Munich, Germany	5th	4 × 400 m relay	3:01.34 SB
2023	European Indoor Championships	Istanbul, Turkey	3rd	4 × 400 m relay	3:06.59 SB
2023	World Championships	Budapest, Hungary	6th	4 × 400 m relay	3:00.40
2024	World Indoor Championships	Glasgow, United Kingdom	3rd	4 × 400 m relay	3:04.25
2024	European Championships	Rome, Italy	9th (h)	4 × 400 m relay	3:03.50
2025	World Championships	Tokyo, Japan	8th	4 × 400 m relay	3:04.84

=== Personal bests ===
- 100 metres – 10.95 (+0.0 m/s, Leiden 2020)
  - 200 metres indoor – 21.89 (Vienna 2021)
- 400 metres – 45.58 (Bern 2021)
  - 400 metres indoor – 46.48 (Apeldoorn 2021)
- 400 m hurdles – 49.07 (Tallinn 2021)

=== National titles ===
- Dutch Athletics Championships
  - 400 m hurdles: 2021, 2023, 2026

== See also ==
- Homosexuality in modern sports
