= Trevor Bassitt =

American sprinter (born 1998)

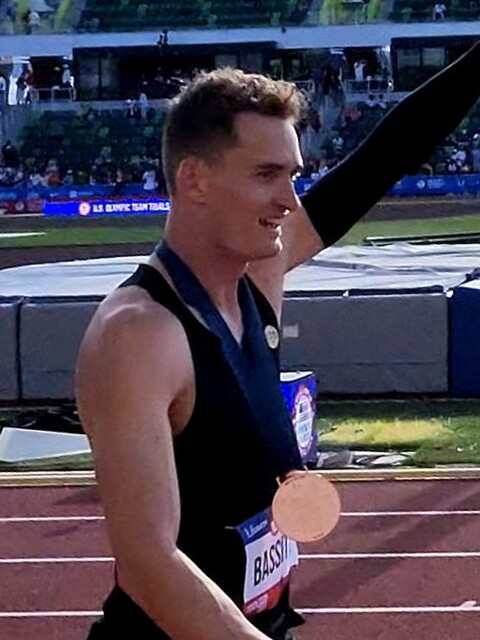
- Bassitt in 2024

Personal information
- Born: February 26, 1998 (age 28) Bluffton, Ohio, U.S.

Sport
- Country: United States
- Sport: Track and field
- Events: 110 metres hurdles, 400 metres hurdles, 400 metres
- College team: Ashland Eagles
Medal record
Men's athletics
Representing the United States
World Championships
Gold medal – first place	2022 Eugene	4 × 400 m relay
Gold medal – first place	2023 Budapest	4 × 400 m relay
Bronze medal – third place	2022 Eugene	400 m hurdles
World Indoor Championships
Silver medal – second place	2022 Belgrade	400 m

Trevor Bassitt (born February 26, 1998) is an American track and field athlete.

== Collegiate career ==
Trevor competed at Ashland University, an NCAA Division II school. He was coached by Jud Logan. Prior to Ashland, he attended, Bluffton High School. While at Ashland, Bassit earned 10 National Championships and 21 All-American awards in various events. He would also help lead the Ashland Eagles to three consecutive NCAA National Championships. He finished his Division II career with 2 NCAA DII records (Indoor 200 m-20.40, Indoor 400 m-45.27) and with 3 USTFCCA National Athlete Of The Year awards.

== Professional career ==
Previously [] an unsponsored athlete, and without a permanent coach following the death of Jud Logan in the winter of 2022, Bassitt won the gold medal in the men's 400 metres event at the 2022 USA Indoor Track and Field Championships held in Spokane, Washington.

He finished 2nd at the 2022 USA Outdoor Track and Field Championships in the 400 m hurdles with a time of 47.47 s, to qualify for the 2022 World Athletics Championships.

He won the bronze medal in the men's 400 metres hurdles event at the 2022 World Athletics Championships held in Eugene, Oregon, United States. Following this individual medal, Trevor was selected as a member of the team USA 4 × 400 m relay to compete in the qualifying heats. As the anchor leg of the relay, the team won their heat in 2:58.96 to qualify for the finals. While not a member of the team competing in the finals, he also earned a gold medal by virtue of team USA winning the 4 × 400 m event. He won the silver medal in the men's 400 metres event at the 2022 World Athletics Indoor Championships held in Belgrade, Serbia.

In November 2022 Bassitt moved to Florida to train under coach Mike Holloway. He finished 3rd in the 400 meter hurdles at the 2023 USA Outdoor Track and Field Championships to secure his spot on his 3rd consecutive National Team. He would go on to run a personal best of 47.38 during the semi-final round of the 2023 World Athletics Championships in Budapest, Hungary. He ended up placing 6th in the final with a time of 48.22. To conclude the meet he ran the lead off leg for Team USA during the heats of the 4 × 400 meter relay that would go on to run 2:58.47. Similar to the 2022 championships he did not compete in the final but still earned a gold medal for his work in the heats.

He became sponsored by Adidas in 2025.

== Statistics ==
=== Circuit performances ===
Grand Slam Track results
Slam	Race group	Event	Pl.	Time	Prize money
2025 Miami Slam	Long hurdles	400 m hurdles	4th	49.49	US$20,000
2025 Miami Slam	Long hurdles	400 m	4th	45.31	US$20,000
2025 Philadelphia Slam	Long hurdles	400 m hurdles	2nd	48.25	US$100,000
2025 Philadelphia Slam	Long hurdles	400 m	1st	45.47	US$100,000

=== International competitions ===
Year	Competition	Venue	Position	Event	Notes
Representing United States
2022	World Indoor Championships	Belgrade, Serbia	2nd	400 m i	45.05
2022	World Championships	Eugene, United States	3rd	400 m hurdles	47.39
2023	World Championships	Budapest, Hungary	6th	400 m hurdles	48.22
2023	World Championships	Budapest, Hungary	1st (h)	4 × 400 m relay	2:58.47
2024	World Indoor Championships	Glasgow, United Kingdom	1st (h)	4 × 400 m relay	3:05.56
2024	Olympic Games	Paris, France	8th (sf)	400 m hurdles	48.29
2026	World Ultimate Championship	Budapest, Hungary	13th (h)	400 m hurdles	48.59

=== Personal bests ===
Outdoor

- 100 m – 10.52 (Cleveland 2021)
- 200 m – 20.52 (Cleveland 2021)
- 400 m – 45.25 (Gainesville 2023)
- 110 mH – 13.59 (Raleigh 2021)
- 400 mH – 47.38 (Budapest 2023)

Indoor

- 60 m – 6.71 (Ashland 2022)
- 200 m – 20.40 (Saginaw Valley State 2021)
- 400 m – 45.05 (Belgrade 2022)
- 60 mH – 7.67 (Saginaw Valley State 2021)
