= Constantin Preis =

German hurdler

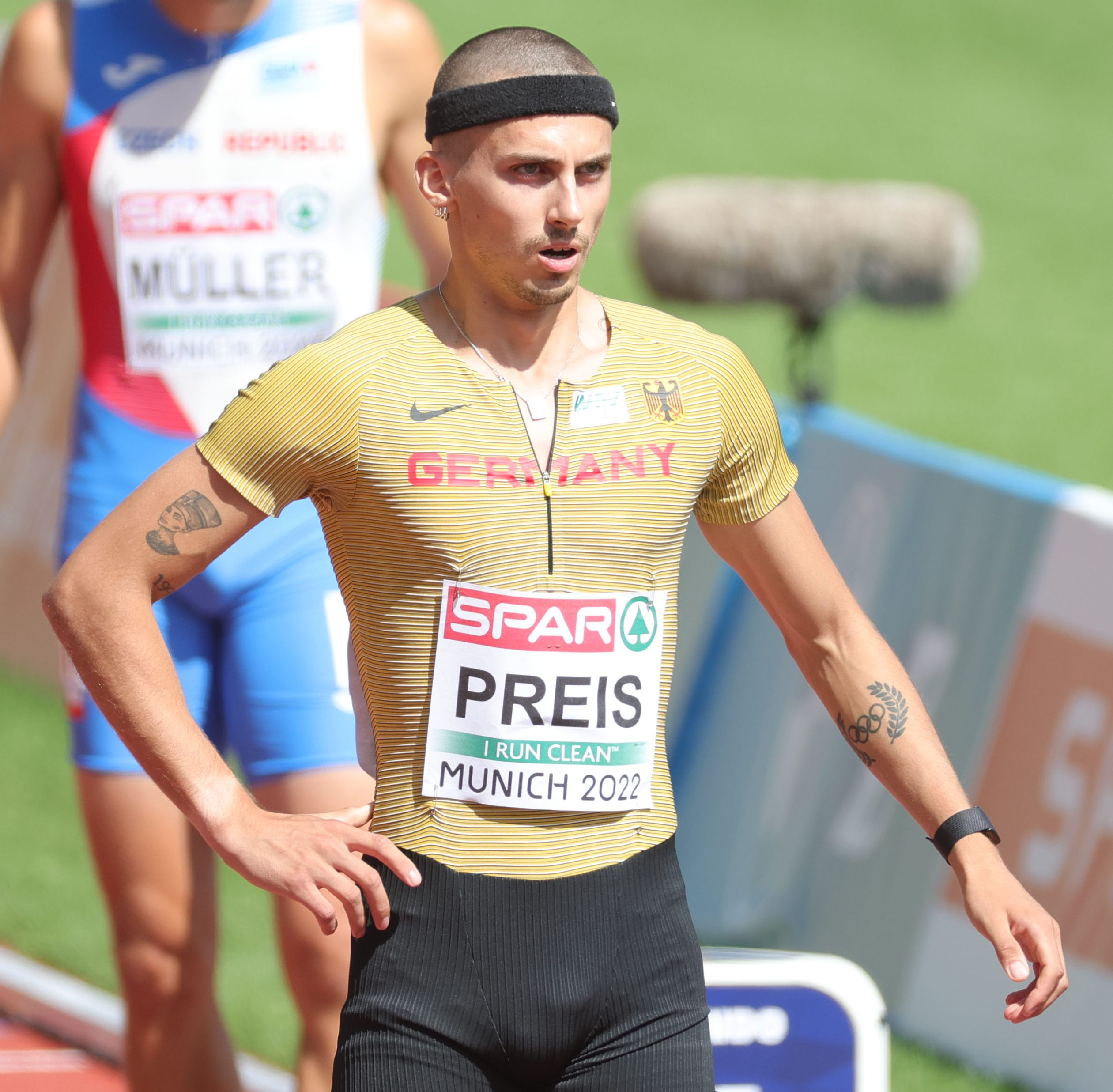

Personal information
- Born: 16 May 1998 (age 28) Chișinău, Moldova

Sport
- Sport: Athletics
- Event: 400 metres hurdles
- Club: VFL Sindelfingen

Constantin Preis (born 16 May 1998) is a German athlete specialising in the 400 metres hurdles. He represented his country at the 2019 World Championships in Doha without advancing from the first round.

His personal best in the event was 49.23 seconds set in Zürich in 2019, he improved it to 48.60 at Centre sportif Bout-du-Monde, in Geneva (SUI) on 12 June 2021.

== Personal life ==
Born in Moldova, Preis moved to Germany at the age of 11.

== International competitions ==
Year	Competition	Venue	Position	Event	Notes
Representing Germany
2017	European U20 Championships	Grosseto, Italy	10th (sf)	400 m hurdles	52.14
2019	European U23 Championships	Gävle, Sweden	4th	400 m hurdles	49.92
2019	World Championships	Doha, Qatar	31st (h)	400 m hurdles	50.93
2021	Olympic Games	Tokyo, Japan	17th (sf)	400 m hurdles	49.10
2022	European Championships	Munich, Germany	14th (sf)	400 m hurdles	49.55
2023	World Championships	Budapest, Hungary	26th (h)	400 m hurdles	49.45
2024	European Championships	Rome, Italy	17th (sf)	400 m hurdles	49.68
2024	Olympic Games	Paris, France	15th (rep)	400 m hurdles	51.02
