= Jesús David Delgado =

Spanish hurdler (born 1999)

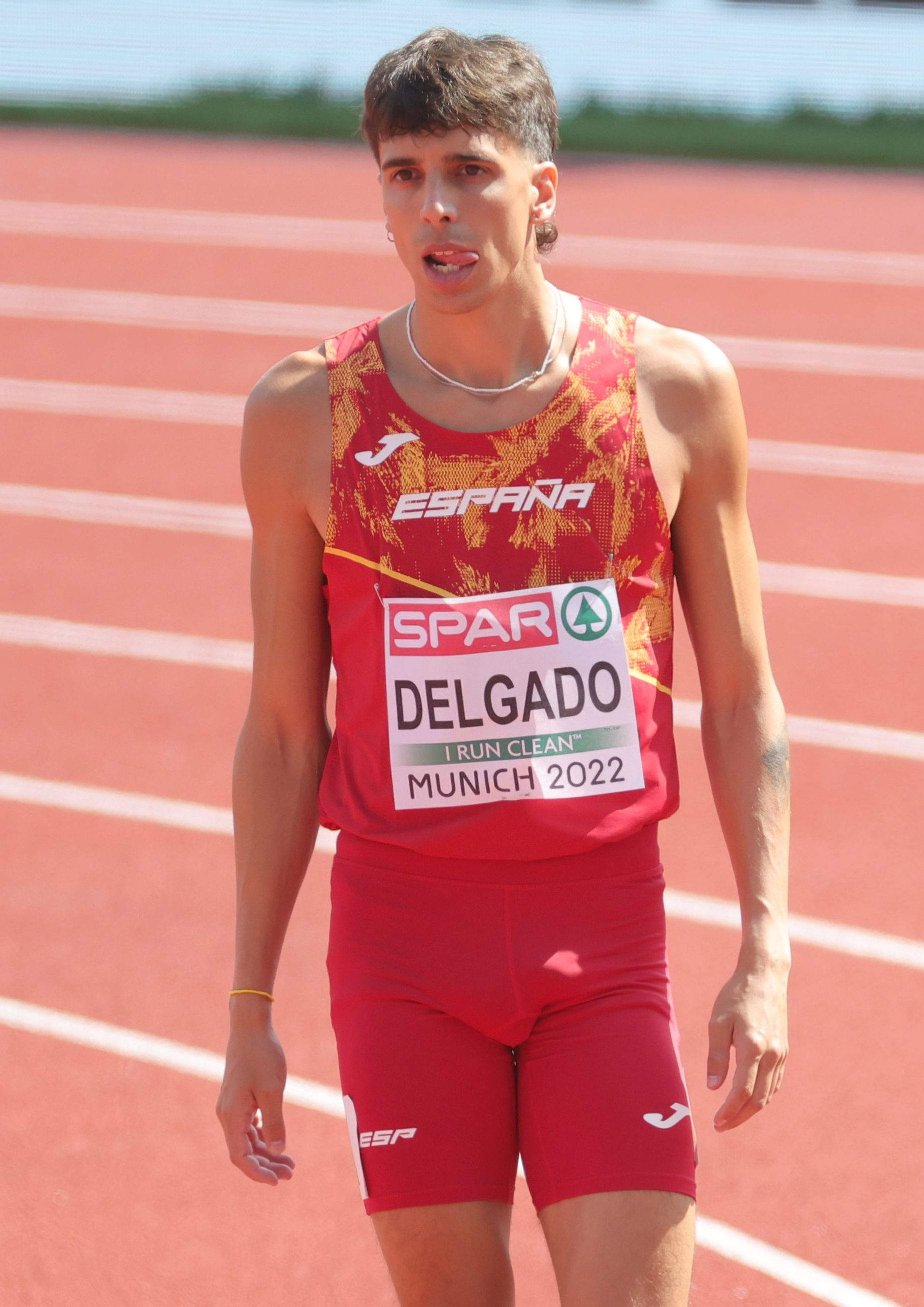
- Jesús David Delgado in Munich 2022

Personal information
- Full name: Jesús David Delgado Pérez
- Born: June 17, 1999 (age 27) Las Palmas, Gran Canaria, Spain

Sport
- Sport: Athletics
- Event: 400 metres hurdles
- Club: TenerifeCajaCanarias
- Coached by: Alex Codina; Germán Millan

Jesús David Delgado Pérez (born 17 June 1999) is a Spanish athlete specialising in the 400 metres hurdles. He won a bronze medal at the 2022 Ibero-American Championships.

== Career ==
In June 2026, at the Ostrava Golden Spike he set a Spanish record of 48.11 to finish second in the men's 400m hurdle race. The previous record (48.87) belonged to Sergio Fernández and had stood for 10 years.

== International competitions ==
Year	Competition	Venue	Position	Event	Notes
Representing Spain
2018	World U20 Championships	Tampere, Finland	19th (sf)	400 m hurdles	52.18
2019	European U23 Championships	Gävle, Sweden	12th (sf)	400 m hurdles	51.34
2021	European U23 Championships	Tallinn, Estonia	8th	400 m hurdles	52.86
2021	European U23 Championships	Tallinn, Estonia	10th (h)	4 × 400 m relay	3:09.14
2022	Ibero-American Championships	La Nucía, Spain	3rd	400 m hurdles	49.82
2022	European Championships	Munich, Germany	22nd (sf)	400 m hurdles	50.32
2023	European Games	Chorzów, Poland	18th	400 m hurdles	50.78
2024	European Championships	Rome, Italy	13th (sf)	400 m hurdles	49.38
2025	World Championships	Tokyo, Japan	19th (sf)	400 m hurdles	49.41
2026	European Championships	Birmingham, United Kingdom	6th	400 m hurdles	48.66

== Personal bests ==
Outdoor

- 400 metres – 48.08 (Nerja 2022)
- 400 metres hurdles – 48.11 (Ostrava 2026)

Indoor

- 400 metres – 47.83 (Salamanca 2020)
