= 2024 European Athletics Championships – Men's 400 metres hurdles =

Men's 400 metres hurdles at the 2024 European Athletics Championships
- Venue: Stadio Olimpico
- Location: Rome
- Dates: 9 June (heats); 10 June (semifinals); 11 June (final)
- Competitors: 36 from 22 nations
- Winning time: 46.98 CR

Medalists
gold medal	Karsten Warholm	Norway
silver medal	Alessandro Sibilio	Italy
bronze medal	Carl Bengtström	Sweden

The men's 400 metres hurdles at the 2024 European Athletics Championships took place at the Stadio Olimpico from 9 to 11 June.

== Records ==
Standing records prior to the 2024 European Athletics Championships
World record	Karsten Warholm (NOR)	45.94	Tokyo, Japan	3 August 2021
European record	Karsten Warholm (NOR)	45.94	Tokyo, Japan	3 August 2021
Championship record	Karsten Warholm (NOR)	47.12	Munich, Germany	19 August 2022
World Leading	Alison dos Santos (BRA)	46.63	Oslo, Norway	30 May 2024
Europe Leading	Karsten Warholm (NOR)	46.70	Oslo, Norway	30 May 2024

== Schedule ==
Date	Time	Round
9 June 2024	13:20	Round 1
10 June 2024	12:40	Semifinals
11 June 2024	21:05	Final

All times are local times (UTC+2)

== Results ==
=== Round 1 ===
The next 12 fastest (q) advance to the semifinals.

Rank	Heat	Lane	Name	Nationality	Time	Note
1	1	5	Thomas Barr	Ireland	49.31	q, SB
2	2	4	Berke Akçam	Turkey	49.32	q
3	1	6	Vít Müller	Czech Republic	49.38	q, SB
4	1	4	Giacomo Bertoncelli	Italy	49.41	q
5	2	3	Julien Bonvin	Switzerland	49.41	q, SB
6	1	9	Mikael Antonio de Jesus	Portugal	49.41	q
7	2	7	Alastair Chalmers	Great Britain	49.71	q
8	3	8	Mario Lambrughi	Italy	49.74	q, SB
9	3	7	David Thid	Sweden	49.81	q, PB
10	2	2	Jesús David Delgado	Spain	49.82	q
11	3	6	Árpád Bánóczy	Hungary	49.95	q
12	3	2	Sergio Fernández	Spain	49.98	q
13	3	3	Dany Brand	Switzerland	49.99	
14	3	5	Krzysztof Hołub	Poland	50.42	
15	1	2	Nikola Kostić	Serbia	50.48	
16	2	5	Adam Smolka	Czech Republic	50.48	SB
17	2	8	Tuomas Lehtonen	Finland	50.50	SB
18	1	8	Dimitris Levantinos	Greece	51.13	
19	1	7	Patrik Dömötör	Slovakia	51.16	
20	3	9	Martín Tuček	Czech Republic	51.27	
21	2	9	Leo Köhldorfer	Austria	51.52	
22	2	6	Matej Baluch	Slovakia	52.17	
23	3	4	Jere Haapalainen	Finland	52.18	
	1	3	Karl Wållgren	Sweden	DNF	

=== Semifinals ===
The first 2 in each heat (Q) and the next 2 fastest (q) advance to the final.

Rank	Heat	Lane	Name	Nationality	Time	Note
1	3	7	Alessandro Sibilio*	Italy	48.07	Q, SB
2	3	4	Berke Akçam	Turkey	48.14	Q, EU23L
3	3	8	Matic Ian Guček*	Slovenia	48.34	q, NR
4	3	6	Emil Agyekum*	Germany	48.36	q, PB
5	2	7	Rasmus Mägi*	Estonia	48.43	Q, SB
6	2	8	Carl Bengtström*	Sweden	48.51	Q
7	3	5	Wilfried Happio*	France	48.55	SB
8	1	8	Karsten Warholm*	Norway	48.75	Q
9	2	9	Alastair Chalmers	Great Britain	48.76	PB
10	2	5	Joshua Abuaku*	Germany	49.13	
11	3	9	Vít Müller	Czech Republic	49.25	SB
12	2	4	Sergio Fernández	Spain	49.34	SB
13	3	3	Jesús David Delgado	Spain	49.38	
14	3	2	David Thid	Sweden	49.52	PB
15	1	5	Nick Smidt*	Netherlands	49.57	Q
16	1	4	Thomas Barr	Ireland	49.61	
17	1	7	Constantin Preis*	Germany	49.68	
18	2	2	Mikael Antonio de Jesus	Portugal	49.72	
19	2	3	Giacomo Bertoncelli	Italy	49.83	
20	1	3	Julien Bonvin	Switzerland	49.95	
21	1	9	Mario Lambrughi	Italy	50.03	
22	1	2	Árpád Bánóczy	Hungary	50.14	
23	2	6	Yasmani Copello*	Turkey	50.57	SB
24	1	6	İsmail Nezir*	Turkey	51.29	

*Athletes that received a bye into the semifinal

=== Final ===
Rank	Lane	Name	Nationality	Time	Note
1st place, gold medalist(s)	8	Karsten Warholm	Norway	46.98	CR
2nd place, silver medalist(s)	7	Alessandro Sibilio	Italy	47.50	NR
3rd place, bronze medalist(s)	9	Carl Bengtström	Sweden	47.94	NR
4	5	Rasmus Mägi	Estonia	48.13	
5	6	Berke Akçam	Turkey	48.17	
6	3	Emil Agyekum	Germany	48.42	
7	2	Matic Ian Guček	Slovenia	48.87	
8	4	Nick Smidt	Netherlands	49.43	
