= Carl Bengtström =

Swedish hurdler

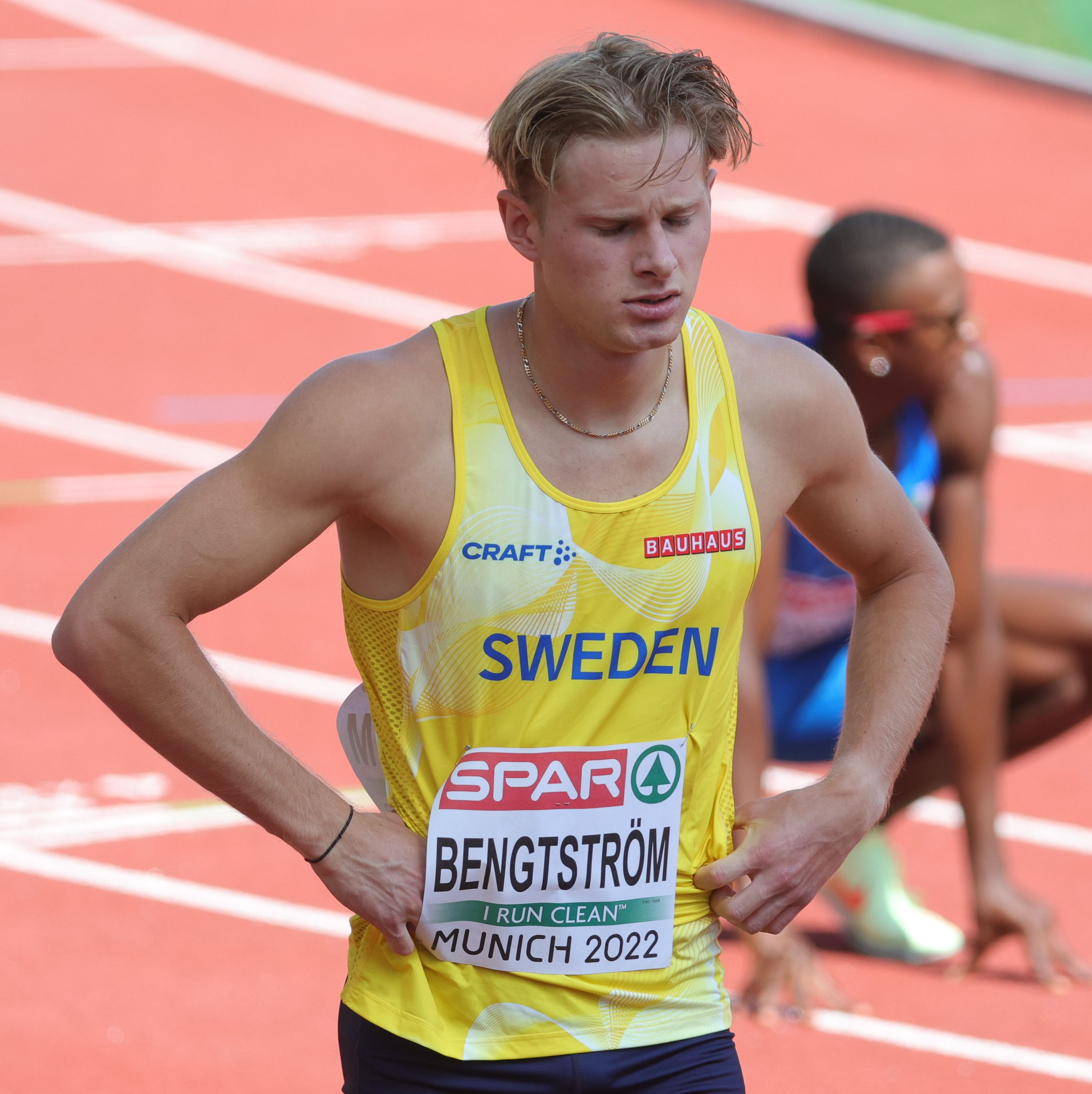
- Bengtström in 2022

Personal information
- Born: 13 January 2000 (age 26) Landvetter, Sweden

Sport
- Sport: Athletics
- Event: 400 metres hurdles
- Club: Örgryte IS
Medal record
Men's athletics
Representing Sweden
World Indoor Championships
Bronze medal – third place	2022 Belgrade	400 m
European Championships
Bronze medal – third place	2024 Rome	400 m hurdles
European Indoor Championships
Bronze medal – third place	2023 Istanbul	400 m
European U20 Championships
Gold medal – first place	2019 Borås	400 m hurdles

Carl Bengtström (born 13 January 2000) is a Swedish athlete in the 400 metres and 400 metres hurdles. He represented his country at the 2021 European Indoor Championships finishing fourth in the final and narrowly missing a medal. He got bronze medals at the 2022 World Indoor Championships and the 2023 European Indoor Championships. He earlier won a gold medal at the 2019 European U20 Championships.

== International competitions ==
Year	Competition	Venue	Position	Event	Notes
Representing Sweden
2016	European Youth Championships	Tbilisi, Georgia	12th (h)	400 m	49.22
2016	European Youth Championships	Tbilisi, Georgia	7th	Medley relay	1:56.29
2017	European U20 Championships	Grosseto, Italy	16th (sf)	400 m	48.08
2018	World U20 Championships	Tampere, Finland	15th (sf)	400 m hurdles	51.55
2018	European Championships	Berlin, Germany	–	4 × 400 m relay	DQ
2019	European Indoor Championships	Glasgow, United Kingdom	20th (h)	400 m i	49.50
2019	European U20 Championships	Borås, Sweden	1st	400 m hurdles	50.32
2021	European Indoor Championships	Toruń, Poland	4th	400 m i	46.42
2022	World Indoor Championships	Belgrade, Serbia	3rd	400 m i	45.33
2022	World Championships	Eugene, United States	9th (sf)	400 m hurdles	48.75
2023	European Indoor Championships	Istanbul, Turkey	3rd	400 m i	45.77
2023	World Championships	Budapest, Hungary	–	400 m	DQ
2024	European Championships	Rome, Italy	3rd	400 m hurdles	47.94
2024	Olympic Games	Paris, France	19th (sf)	400 m hurdles	49.56
2025	World Championships	Tokyo, Japan	34th (h)	400 m hurdles	49.74
2026	European Championships	Birmingham, United Kingdom	9th (sf)	400 m hurdles	48.47

== Personal bests ==
Outdoor

- 100 metres – 10.70 (-0.9 m/s, Skara 2021)
- 200 metres – 20.95 (-1.1 m/s, Linköping 2021)
- 400 metres – 45.98 (Stockholm 2021)
- 800 metres – 1:51.85 (Gothenburg 2020)
- 400 metres hurdles – 48.53 (Bellinzona 2021)

Indoor

- 60 metres – 6.88 (Gothenburg 2021)
- 400 metres – 45.33 (Belgrade 2022)
