= Wilfried Happio =

French hurdler

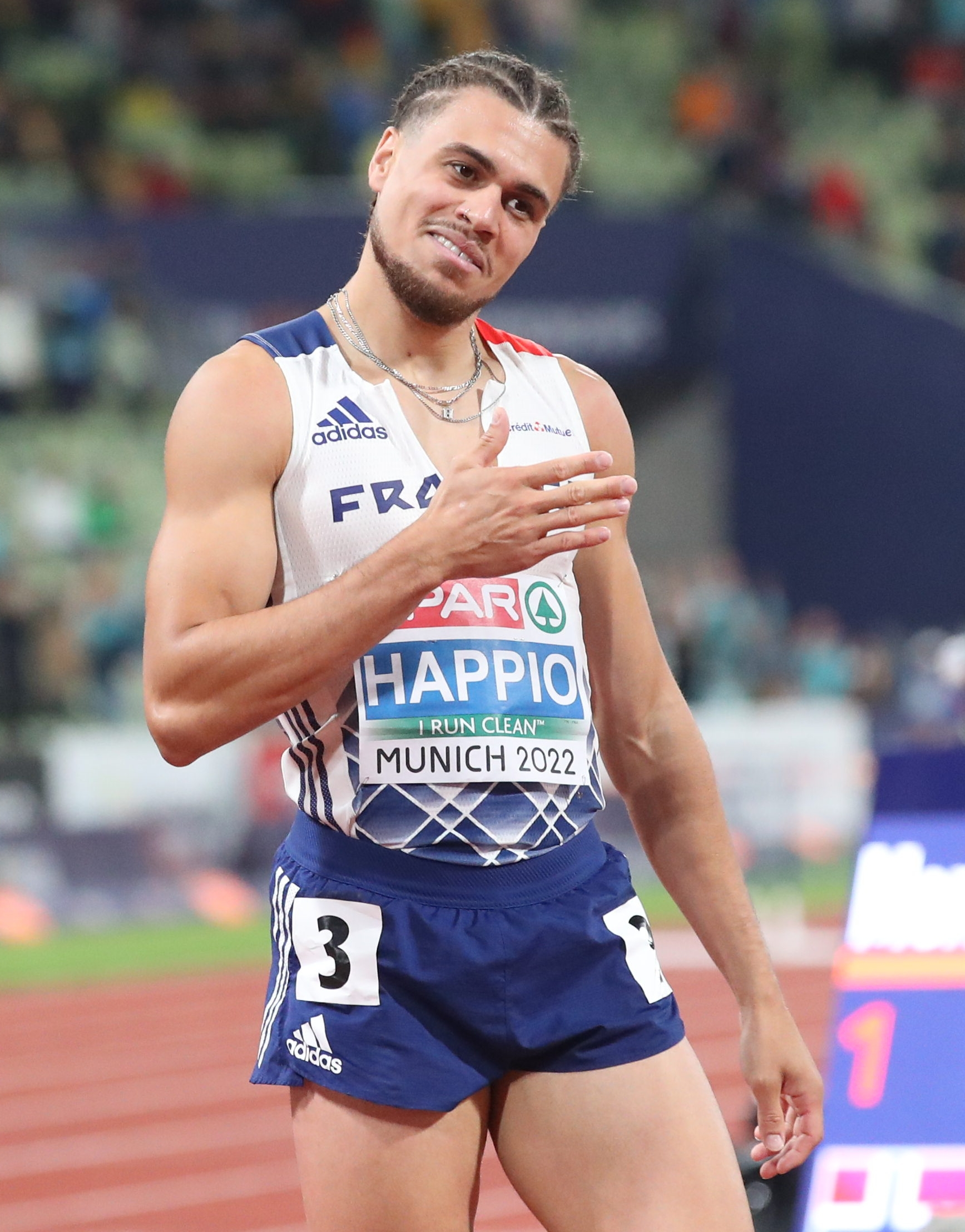
- Happio in 2022

Personal information
- Born: 22 September 1998 (age 28) Bourg-la-Reine, France
- Height: 1.87 m (6 ft 2 in)

Sport
- Sport: Athletics
- Event: 400 metres hurdles
- Club: C.A. L'Haÿ-les-Roses
- Coached by: Tony Renia
Medal record
European Championships
Silver medal – second place	2022 Munich	400 m hurdles
European U23 Championships
Gold medal – first place	2019 Gävle	400 m hurdles
European U20 Championships
Gold medal – first place	2017 Grosseto	400 m hurdles
Mediterranean U23 Championships
Silver medal – second place	2018 Jesolo	400 m hurdles

Wilfried Happio (born 22 September 1998) is a French athlete specialising in the 400 metres hurdles. Born by a Martinican mother and a father from Metropolitan France, he won gold medals at the 2017 European U20 and 2019 European U23 Championships.

His personal best in the event is 47.41 seconds set in Eugene Oregon in 2022.

In June 2025, Happio was served with an 18-month competition ban backdated to January 2025 for an anti-doping rule violation in relation to three missed tests ("whereabouts failures").

== Personal life ==
In 2020, Happio is accused of assaulting triple jump athlete Janet Scott, with whom he had a brief romantic relationship. The commission considered, after its judgment, that the facts were "not sufficiently established", and said it was unable "to establish whether Mr. Happio assaulted Ms. Scott or whether he acted in self-defense. "

In 2022, he is the subject of a complaint for acts of sexual assault dating back to 2021 which were allegedly committed against another athlete resident at INSEP, a specialist in triple jump. He is eventually taken into custody on 20 December as part of the investigation for "sexual assault".

== International competitions ==
Year	Competition	Venue	Position	Event	Notes
Representing France
2015	World Youth Championships	Cali, Colombia	20th (sf)	400 m hurdles (84 cm)	53.42
2017	European U20 Championships	Grosseto, Italy	1st	400 m hurdles	49.93
2018	Mediterranean U23 Championships	Jesolo, Italy	2nd	400 m hurdles	50.65
2019	European U23 Championships	Gävle, Sweden	1st	400 m hurdles	49.03
2019	World Championships	Doha, Qatar	33rd (h)	400 m hurdles	51.25
2021	Olympic Games	Tokyo, Japan	21st (sf)	400 m hurdles	49.49
2022	World Championships	Eugene, United States	4th	400 m hurdles	47.41
2022	European Championships	Munich, Germany	2nd	400 m hurdles	48.56
2023	World Championships	Budapest, Hungary	16th (sf)	400 m hurdles	48.83
2024	European Championships	Rome, Italy	7th (sf)	400 m hurdles	48.55
2024	Olympic Games	Paris, France	12th (sf)	400 m hurdles	48.66
