= Emil Agyekum =

German athlete (born 1999)

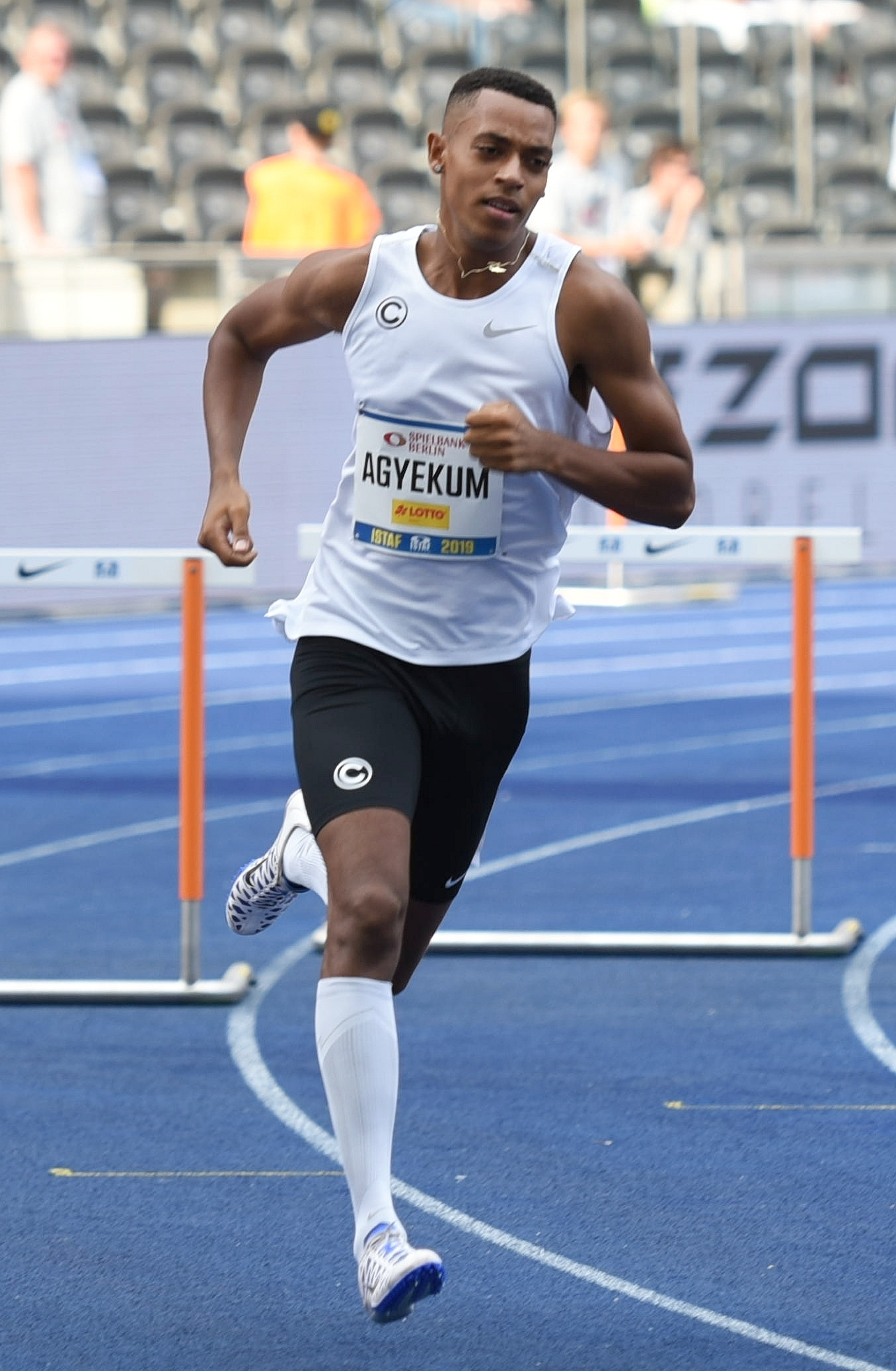
- Agyekum in 2019

Personal information
- Nationality: German
- Born: 22 May 1999 (age 27)

Sport
- Sport: Athletics
- Event: Hurdles

Achievements and titles
- Personal bests: 300 m hurdles 34.58 (Oslo, 2025); 400 m hurdles: 47.10 (Budapest, 2026) NR
Medal record
Men's athletics
Representing Germany
European Championships
Silver medal – second place	2026 Birmingham	400 m hurdles
Bronze medal – third place	2024 Rome	4 × 400 m relay
European U23 Championships
Silver medal – second place	2021 Tallinn	400 m hurdles
Bronze medal – third place	2021 Tallinn	4 × 400 m relay
Bronze medal – third place	2019 Gävle	400 m hurdles
European Youth Championships
Bronze medal – third place	2016 Tbilisi	400 m hurdles

Emil Agyekum (born 22 May 1999) is a German hurdler and sprinter. He is the German national record holder in the 400 metres hurdles. He won the silver medal at the 2026 European Championships in the 400 metres hurdles and a bronze medal in the Men's 4 × 400 m relay at the 2024 European Championships.

== Biography ==
In Tbilisi in 2016, he was a European U18 Championships bronze medallist in the 400 m hurdles. In 2019, he was a European U23 Championships bronze medallist in the 400 m hurdles in Gävle, Sweden. In Tallinn in 2021, he was European U23 Championships silver medallist in the 400 m hurdles. At the same event he was a bronze medalist in the 4 × 400 m relay.

Agyekum reached the semifinals of the 400 m hurdles at the 2023 World Athletics Championships in Budapest. He ran a personal best time of 48.47 in the 400m hurdles in Berlin in September 2023. The time meet the minimum standard for the 2024 Olympic Games in Paris.

Agyekum ran as part of the German Mixed 4 × 400 m relay team and Men's 4 × 400 m relay team at the 2024 World Relays Championships in Nassau, Bahamas. At the event, both those German teams qualified for the 2024 Paris Olympics.

In May 2024, he was selected for the 2024 European Athletics Championships in Rome and reached the final with a personal best time of 48.36 seconds. He placed sixth overall in the final, running 48.42 seconds. At the same championships, he ran the anchor leg for the German 4 × 400 metres team that won the bronze medal.

He competed at the 2024 Summer Olympics in Paris in August 2024, in the 400 metres hurdles, reaching the semi-finals. He also competed in the men's 4 × 400 m relay at the Games.

He competed at the 2025 World Athletics Relays in China in the Mixed 4 × 400 metres relay in May 2025. He ran a personal best of 34.58 seconds for the 300 metres hurdles at the 2025 Bislett Games in Oslo on 12 June 2025. That month, he finished fourth in the 400 metres hurdles in Stockholm at the 2025 BAUHAUS-galan, part of the 2025 Diamond League.

He was selected for the German team for the 2025 World Athletics Championships in Tokyo, Japan, running on the opening day in the mixed 4 × 400 metres relay. He was a finalist in the men's 400 metres hurdles, running a personal best 47.83 seconds in the semi-final before placing sixth overall.

On 7 June 2026, he set a new personal best in finishing third at the 2026 Bauhausgalan in Stockholm in 47.72 seconds. On 14 July, he ran a meeting record 47.58 seconds to win the 400 m hurdles at the István Gyulai Memorial, in Budapest. Competing at the 2026 London Athletics Meet on 18 July, he ran 47.75 seconds for the 400 m hurdles to beat Harald Schmid's long-standing German national record from 1982. In August, he won the silver medal behind Karsten Warholm in the 400 metres hurdles final at the 2026 European Championships in Birmingham, running 47.87 seconds. At the 2026 Diamond League Final in Brussels in September, he placed fourth in the 400 metres hurdles. Competing at the inaugural World Ultimate Championship in Budapest on 13 September, Agyekum broke his own national record with 47.10 seconds to finish in fourth.

== Personal life ==
Born in Germany, Agyekum is of mixed German and Ghanaian descent.
