= 2016 European Athletics Youth Championships =

European athletics competition

1st European Athletics Youth Championships
- Dates: 14–17 July 2016
- Host city: Tbilisi, Georgia
- Venue: Athletics Stadium of Tbilisi
- Level: Youth
- Events: 40
- Participation: 900 athletes from 46 nations

The 2016 European Athletics Youth Championships was the first edition of the biennial, continental athletics competition for European athletes aged fifteen to seventeen. It was held in Tbilisi, Georgia from 14 to 17 July and was established following the 2013 Congress of the EAA in Skopje. The event programme mirrored that of the previous IAAF World Youth Championships in Athletics, with the exception of a boy's decathlon, rather than the octathlon. Around 900 athletes from 46 European Athletics Member Federations took part.

This was the only edition of the championships to be described as "Youth Championships". World and European Athletics hereafter changed their nomenclature from "Youth" and "Junior" to "Under-18" and "Under-20" respectively.

== Medal summary ==
=== Men ===
Event	Gold		Silver		Bronze	
100 metres	Marvin Schulte; Germany	10.56 PB	Henrik Larsson; Sweden	10.57 PB	Samuel Purola; Finland	10.62 =PB
200 metres	Jona Efoloko; Great Britain	21.15	Kasper Kadestål; Sweden	21.18 PB	Pol Retamal; Spain	21.24
400 metres	Ihar Zubko; Belarus	47.16 PB	Mihai Cristian Pislaru; Romania	47.46	Mahsum Korkmaz; Turkey	47.69
800 metres	George Mills; Great Britain	1:48.82 PB	Andrea Romani; Italy	1:49.58	Simone Barontini; Italy	1:49.78
1500 metres	Jake Heyward; Great Britain	4:00.64	Pierre Proust; France	4:01.62	Enrique Herreros; Spain	4:02.06
3000 metres	Elzan Bibić; Serbia	8:09.06	Annasse Mahboub El Hamdouini; Spain	8:20.20 PB	Adrian Garcea; Romania	8:20.94 PB
110 metres hurdles	Dániel Eszes; Hungary	13.39 PB	Tuur Bras; Belgium	13.42 PB	Jason Nicholson; Great Britain	13.45 PB
400 metres hurdles	Alessandro Sibilio; Italy	51.46 PB	Aleix Porras; Spain	51.56	Emil Agyekum; Germany	51.80 PB
2000 metres steeplechase	Tim Van de Velde; Belgium	5:53.77	Stefan Schmid; Austria	5:54.79 PB	Rémi Schyns; Belgium	5:55.06 PB
Medley relay	Italy; Lorenzo Paissan; Mario Marchei; Alessandro Sibilio; Andrea Romani	1:52.78 PB	Spain; Sergio López; Jesús Gómez; Pol Retamal; Ivan Alba	1:53.62 PB	Poland; Damian Sztejkowski; Rafał Pająk; Szymon Kreft; Maciej Wójcik	1:53.80 PB
10,000 m walk	Łukasz Niedziałek; Poland	44:06.49	Abdulselam Imük; Turkey	45:30.41	David Kuster; France	45:42.09
High jump	Lucas Mihota; Germany	2.18 PB	Adonios Merlos; Greece	2.16 =PB	Dmytro Nikitin; Ukraine	2.16 PB
Pole vault	Emmanouil Karalis; Greece	5.45	Bo Kanda Lita Baehre; Germany	5.30 =PB	Sondre Guttormsen; Norway	5.05 PB
Long jump	Panayiotis Mantzouroyiannis; Greece	7.60	Enzo Hodebar; France	7.54	Bogdan Sitoianu; Romania	7.31 PB
Triple jump	Martin Lamou; France	16.03 PB	Andrea Dallavalle; Italy	15.74 PB	Răzvan Cristian Grecu; Romania	15.62 SB
Shot put	Odisseas Mouzenidis; Greece	21.51 NYR	Dzmitry Karpuk; Belarus	21.24 PB	Eero Ahola; Finland	21.24
Discus throw	Georgios Koniarakis; Cyprus	62.16	Tim Ader; Germany	60.84 PB	Jan Vasco Bringmann; Germany	60.62 PB
Hammer throw	Myhaylo Havrylyuk; Ukraine	82.26 NYR	Jake Norris; Great Britain	79.20 PB	Ragnar Carlsson; Sweden	75.71 PB
Javelin throw	Kristaps Jaunpujens; Latvia	77.01	Alexei Oleinik; Moldova	74.49 PB	Matiss Velps; Latvia	74.47 PB
Decathlon	Manuel Wagner; Germany	7382 PB	Jorg Vanlierde; Belgium	7311 PB	Leon Okafor; Austria	7232

=== Women ===
Event	Gold		Silver		Bronze	
100 metres	Keshia Kwadwo; Germany	11.76	Gina Akpe-Moses; Ireland	11.80 PB	Klaudia Adamek; Poland	11.82
200 metres	Marine Mignon; France	23.35 PB	Alisha Rees; Great Britain	23.70	Nikola Bendová; Czech Republic	24.00
400 metres	Andrea Miklós; Romania	52.70 PB	Karolina Łozowska; Poland	54.56	Josefine Tomine Eriksen; Norway	55.26
800 metres	Isabelle Boffey; Great Britain	2:07.19	Anna Burt; Great Britain	2:08.54	Gabriela Gajanová; Slovakia	2:09.43
1500 metres	Delia Sclabas; Switzerland	4:22.51 PB	Sabrina Sinha; Great Britain	4:23.10	Erin Wallace; Great Britain	4:28.17
3000 metres	Delia Sclabas; Switzerland	9:23.44 PB	Stine Wangberg; Norway	9:26.65 PB	Lucy Pygott; Great Britain	9:28.15 PB
100 metres hurdles	Desola Oki; Italy	13.30 =PB	Viktoryia Zakharchuk; Belarus	13.48 PB	Molly Scott; Ireland	13.51
400 metres hurdles	Viivi Lehikoinen; Finland	58.28	Yasmin Giger; Switzerland	58.39 PB	Sara Gallego; Spain	58.73 PB
2000 metres steeplechase	Anna Mark Helwigh; Denmark	6:34.52 PB	Tíra Pavuk; Hungary	6:41.70	Lora Ontl; Croatia	6:43.60 PB
Medley relay	France; Cyrena Samba-Mayela; Éloïse de la Taille; Marine Mignon; Iman Jean	2:08.48 PB	Poland; Klaudia Adamek; Alicja Potasznik; Martyna Kotwiła; Karolina Łozowska	2:08.57 PB	Italy; Camilla Maestrini; Zaynab Dosso; Valeria Simonelli; Letizia Tiso	2:08.99 PB
5000 m walk	Meryem Bekmez; Turkey	22:50.22 PB	Ayşe Tekdal; Turkey	22:58.17 PB	Marina Peña; Spain	23:05.90
High jump	Maja Nilsson; Sweden	1.82 PB	Urte Baikstyte; Lithuania	1.79	Despina Maltabe; Greece	1.75
Pole vault	Alina Strömberg; Finland	4.15 PB	Meritxell Benito; Spain	4.05	Amálie Švábíková; Czech Republic	4.05
Long jump	Holly Mills; Great Britain	6.19	Maja Bedrač; Slovenia	6.19	Marisa Carvalho; Portugal	6.08
Triple jump	Georgiana Iuliana Anitei; Romania	13.19	Eva Pepelnak; Slovenia	13.03 PB	Tene Cisse; France	12.79
Shot put	Alexandra Emelianova; Moldova	18.50 PB	Jule Steuer; Germany	17.97 PB	Sydney Giampietro; Italy	17.45
Discus throw	Alexandra Emelianova; Moldova	58.09 PB	Amelie Döbler; Germany	50.14	Helena Leveelahti; Finland	49.34 PB
Hammer throw	Kateřina Skypalová; Czech Republic	66.58 PB	Tatsiana Ramanouvich; Belarus	66.16	Kiira Väänänen; Finland	66.00
Javelin throw	Arianne Duarte Morais; Norway	60.89 PB	Carolina Visca; Italy	59.10	Elina Kinnunen; Finland	57.40 PB
Heptathlon	Alina Shukh; Ukraine	6186 WYB	Sarah Lagger; Austria	6175 NYR	Niamh Emerson; Great Britain	5919

== Medal table ==
Rank	Nation	Gold	Silver	Bronze	Total
1	Great Britain (GBR)	5	4	4	13
2	Germany (GER)	4	4	2	10
3	Italy (ITA)	3	3	3	9
4	France (FRA)	3	2	2	7
5	Greece (GRE)	3	1	1	5
6	Romania (ROU)	2	1	3	6
7	Moldova (MDA)	2	1	0	3
7	Switzerland (SUI)	2	1	0	3
9	Finland (FIN)	2	0	5	7
10	Ukraine (UKR)	2	0	1	3
11	Belarus (BLR)	1	3	0	4
12	Poland (POL)	1	2	2	5
13	Belgium (BEL)	1	2	1	4
13	Sweden (SWE)	1	2	1	4
13	Turkey (TUR)	1	2	1	4
16	Norway (NOR)	1	1	2	4
17	Hungary (HUN)	1	1	0	2
18	Czech Republic (CZE)	1	0	2	3
19	Latvia (LAT)	1	0	1	2
20	Cyprus (CYP)	1	0	0	1
20	Denmark (DEN)	1	0	0	1
20	Serbia (SRB)	1	0	0	1
23	Spain (ESP)	0	4	4	8
24	Austria (AUT)	0	2	1	3
25	Slovenia (SLO)	0	2	0	2
26	Ireland (IRL)	0	1	1	2
27	Lithuania (LTU)	0	1	0	1
28	Croatia (CRO)	0	0	1	1
28	Portugal (POR)	0	0	1	1
28	Slovakia (SVK)	0	0	1	1
Totals (30 entries)		40	40	40	120

== Participating nations ==
- Andorra (AND) (5)
- Armenia (ARM) (4)
- Austria (AUT) (17)
- Azerbaijan (AZE) (1)
- Belarus (BLR) (31)
- Belgium (BEL) (18)
- Bosnia and Herzegovina (BIH) (4)
- Bulgaria (BUL) (16)
- Croatia (CRO) (15)
- Cyprus (CYP) (3)
- Czech Republic (CZE) (32)
- Denmark (DEN) (12)
- Estonia (EST) (21)
- Finland (FIN) (26)
- France (FRA) (37)
- Georgia (GEO) (14) (host)
- Germany (GER) (46)
- Gibraltar (GIB) (3)
- Great Britain (GBR) (33)
- Greece (GRE) (20)
- Hungary (HUN) (39)
- Iceland (ISL) (3)
- Ireland (IRL) (30)
- Israel (ISR) (8)
- Italy (ITA) (55)
- Kosovo (KOS) (4)
- Latvia (LAT) (15)
- Lithuania (LTU) (20)
- Luxembourg (LUX) (4)
- Macedonia (MKD) (2)
- Malta (MLT) (2)
- Moldova (MDA) (2)
- Monaco (MON) (1)
- Norway (NOR) (28)
- Poland (POL) (40)
- Portugal (POR) (15)
- Romania (ROU) (31)
- San Marino (SMR) (4)
- Serbia (SRB) (17)
- Slovakia (SVK) (16)
- Slovenia (SLO) (37)
- Spain (ESP) (43)
- Sweden (SWE) (23)
- Switzerland (SUI) (30)
- Turkey (TUR) (37)
- Ukraine (UKR) (46)
