= Alex Knibbs =

English sprinter (born 1999)

Personal information
- Nationality: British (English)
- Born: 26 April 1999 (age 26)

Sport
- Sport: Athletics
- Event: 400 metres
- Club: Amber Valley
- Coached by: Nick Dakin

Alex Knibbs (born 26 April 1999) is an English athlete specialising in the 400 metre hurdles.

He became British champion when winning the 400 metres event at the 2020 British Athletics Championships in a time of 46.65 secs.

== Personal life ==
Knibbs was born in England and is of Jamaican descent through his paternal grandparents. Knibbs' dad, Ralph Knibbs is a former elite rugby union player for Bristol. His brother is professional footballer Harvey Knibbs, who plays for Charlton Athletic FC .
