= Yasmani Copello =

Cuban-born track & field hurdler (born 1987)

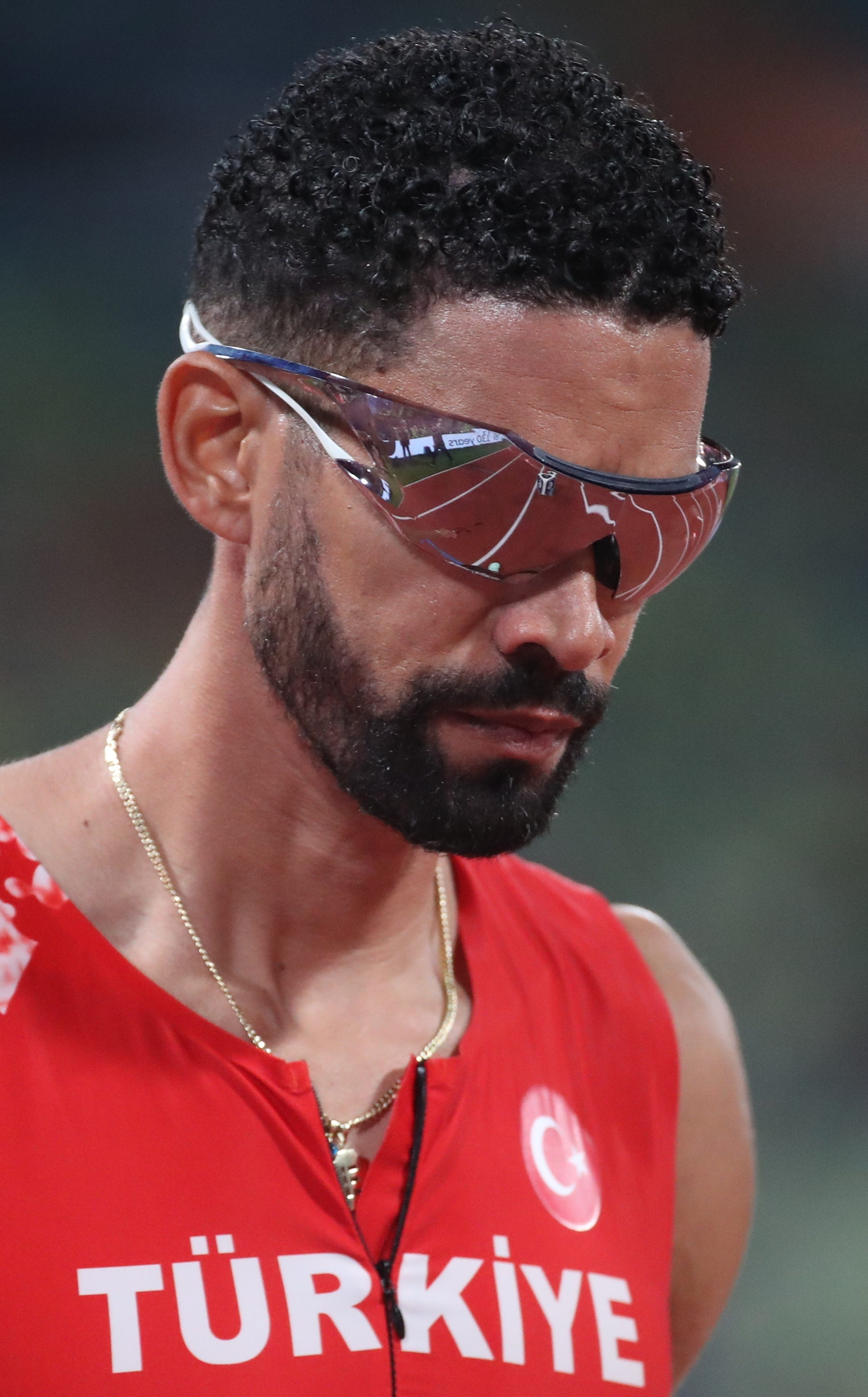
- Copello in 2022

Personal information
- Full name: Yasmani Copello Escobar
- Nationality: Cuban/Turkish
- Born: 15 April 1987 (age 39) Havana, Cuba
- Height: 191 cm (6 ft 3 in)
- Weight: 85 kg (187 lb)

Sport
- Country: Turkey
- Sport: Athletics
- Event: 400 m hurdles
- Club: Enka SK
Medal record
Men's athletics
Representing Turkey
Olympic Games
Bronze medal – third place	2016 Rio de Janeiro	400 m hurdles
World Championships
Silver medal – second place	2017 London	400 m hurdles
European Championships
Gold medal – first place	2016 Amsterdam	400 m hurdles
Silver medal – second place	2018 Berlin	400 m hurdles
Bronze medal – third place	2022 Munich	400 m hurdles
European Team Championships
Silver medal – second place	2017 Lille	400 m hurdles
Mediterranean Games
Gold medal – first place	2022 Oran	400 m hurdles
Silver medal – second place	2018 Tarragona	400 m hurdles
Silver medal – second place	2022 Oran	4 × 400 m relay
Islamic Solidarity Games
Silver medal – second place	2021 Konya	400 m hurdles
Representing Cuba
CAC Championships
Silver medal – second place	2008 Cali	400 m hurdles
Ibero-American Championships
Gold medal – first place	2008 Iquique	4 × 400 m relay

Yasmani Copello Escobar (born 15 April 1987) is a Cuban-born track and field hurdler who represents Turkey internationally. His personal best for the 400 metres hurdles is 47.81 seconds, set in the final of the 2018 European Athletics Championships in Berlin.

While representing Cuba he won a silver medal at the 2008 Central American and Caribbean Championships and was a gold medallist in the 4 × 400 metres relay team at the 2008 Ibero-American Championships in Athletics. He won two silver medals in the hurdles and two relay gold medals at the ALBA Games in 2007 and 2009. He moved to Turkey in 2012 and began representing his adopted country in 2014.

== Career ==
In Cuba

He began competing at national level in Cuba as a teenager in 2006. That year he placed fourth in the 400 metres hurdles at the Cuban Athletics Championships and came fifth at the Olimpiada Cubana. He began 2007 with a series of personal bests. He improved in the 400 metres flat to record 47.48 seconds at the Rafael Fortun National Meeting and a 400 m hurdles run of 50.43 seconds in Havana. In his first international appearance he came runner-up to fellow Cuban Omar Cisneros to take silver at the 2007 ALBA Games in a new best of 49.99 seconds. He teamed up with Cisneros to help Cuba to the gold medals in the 4 × 400 metres relay at the event. Copello won another title with the Cuban relay team at the 2008 Ibero-American Championships in Athletics. He ran individually at the 2008 Central American and Caribbean Championships, securing the silver 400 m hurdles medal behind Jamaica's Isa Phillips as well as running in the heats of the 110 metres hurdles. He was provisionally named in the relay squad for Cuba at the 2008 Summer Olympics, but ultimately did not compete.

At the 2009 ALBA Games he repeated his finishes of two years earlier, coming second to Cisneros before sharing in a relay victory. His return at the 2009 Central American and Caribbean Championships in Athletics was less successful however, as he finished out of the medals in fifth place – the medallists, Javier Culson, Félix Sánchez and Jehue Gordon were all finalists at the 2009 World Championships in Athletics. That year brought new heights in performance, however, as in February in Havana he ran 21.44 seconds for the 200 metres, 46.77 seconds for the 400 m, and 49.56 seconds for the 400 m hurdles.

Copello competing sparingly in 2010, with highlights being a second place at Cuba's Barrientos Memorial and a win at the 2010 Olimpiada Cubana. He won the 2011 Copa Cuba meet, but that proved to be his last win in his home nation. He moved to Turkey in 2012 and began competing for Fenerbahçe Athletics, winning at the national club championships. At the 2013 Meeting Val de Reuil in France, he achieved a personal best and Cuban record of 49.54 seconds for the uncommonly held indoor 400 m hurdles. This made his indoor best faster than his outdoor one – a highly unusual feat for a 400 m hurdler.

In Turkey

He opted for Turkish nationality in October 2013, and on 30 April 2014, he became eligible to represent Turkey internationally.

== Personal bests ==
- 200 metres – 21.44 seconds (2009)
- 400 metres – 46.77 seconds (2009)
- 110 metres hurdles – 14.35A seconds (2008)
- 400 metres hurdles (outdoor) – 47.81 seconds (2018)
- 400 metres hurdles (indoor) – 49.54 seconds (2013)
