= Aleix Porras =

Spanish 400 m hurdler

Personal information
- Nationality: Spanish

Sport
- Sport: Athletics
- Event: 400 m hurdles

Aleix Porras Cantons is a Spanish 400 metres hurdler. He won silver in the boys' 400 m hurdles at the 2016 European Athletics U18 Championships in Tbilisi and placed sixth at the 2017 European Athletics U20 Championships. Later he competed in the men's 4 × 400 m relay at the 2018 IAAF World Indoor Championships in Birmingham and in the 400 m hurdles at the 2022 European Athletics Championships in Munich. Porras won the Spanish national title in 2022, setting a personal best of 49.68 s in Nerja.
