= Alessandro Sibilio =

Italian sprinter

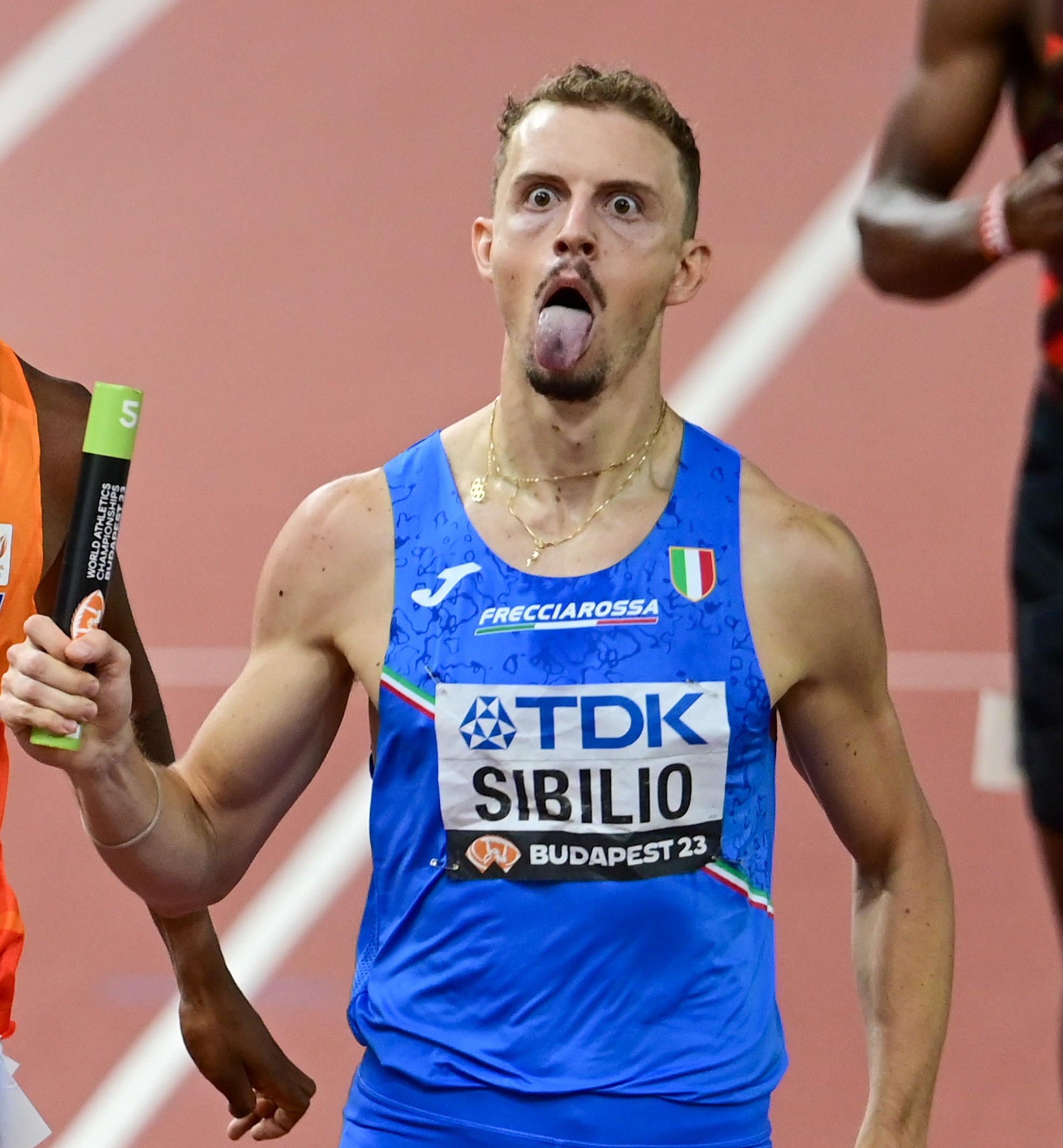
- Sibilio at Budapest 2023.

Personal information
- National team: Italy: 2 caps
- Born: 27 April 1999 (age 27) Naples, Italy
- Height: 1.87 m (6 ft 2 in)
- Weight: 74 kg (163 lb)

Sport
- Sport: Athletics
- Events: 400 metres 400 m hs
- Club: Atletica Riccardi; G.S. Fiamme Gialle
- Coached by: Gianpaolo Ciappa

Achievements and titles
- Personal bests: 400 m: 45.08 (2022); 400 m hs: 47.50 (2024)
Medal record
Men's athletics
Representing Italy
European Championships
Silver medal – second place	2024 Rome	400 m hurdles
European Games
Gold medal – first place	2023 Kraków-Małopolska	400 m hurdles
Gold medal – first place	2021 Chorzów	400 m hurdles
European U23 Championships
Gold medal – first place	2021 Tallinn	400 m hurdles
Silver medal – second place	2021 Tallinn	4 × 400 m relay
World U20 Championships
Gold medal – first place	2018 Tampere	4 × 400 m relay
European U20 Championships
Silver medal – second place	2017 Grosseto	400 m hurdles
Gold medal – first place	2017 Grosseto	4 × 400 m relay
European 18 Championships
Gold medal – first place	2016 Tbilisi	400 m hurdles
Gold medal – first place	2016 Tbilisi	Medley relay

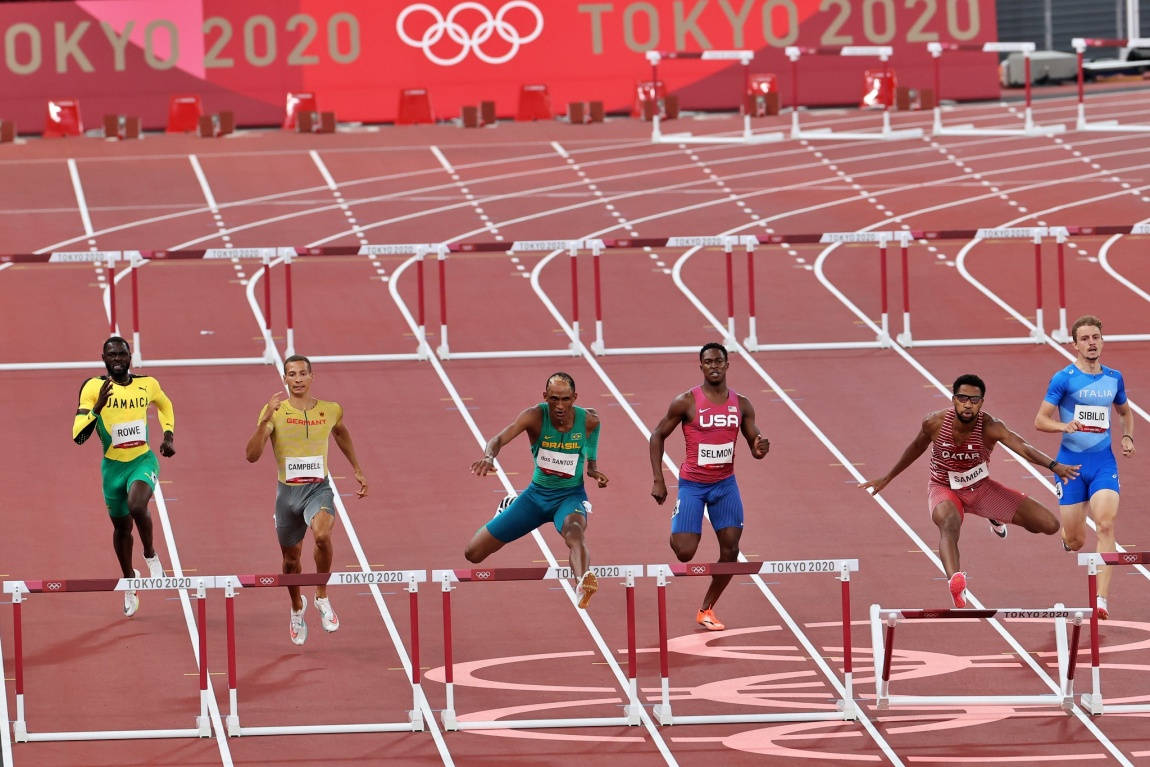
Sibilio (first from right) in the semifinal of the 400 m hs at Tokyo 2020.

Alessandro Sibilio (born 27 April 1999) is an Italian sprinter and hurdler, who competes in the 400 metres hurdles and 400 metres. He won a gold medal at the 2018 IAAF World U20 Championships. He competed at the 2020 Summer Olympics, in 400 m hurdles.

Sibilio also competed for Italy at the 2024 Summer Olympics in the men's 400 metres hurdles and men's 4 × 400 metres relay events.

== Personal bests ==
- 400 metres: 45.08 ( (Italy) Nocera Inferiore, 18 June 2022)
- 400 metres hurdles: 47.50 ( (Italy) Roma, 11 June 2024)

== Progression ==
Personal best

400 m hs

Year (age)	Performance	Venue	Date
2022 (23)	45.08	(Italy) Nocera Inferiore	18 JUN 2022
2021 (22)	46.13	(Italy) Rome	16 APR 2021
2020 (21)	50.46	(Italy) Grosseto	20 SEP 2020
2019 (20)	50.72	(Italy) Conegliano	21 JUN 2019
2018 (19)	50.73	(Finland) Tampere	13 JUL 2018
2017 (18)	50.34	(Italy) Grosseto	23 JUL 2017

== Achievements ==
Year	Competition	Venue	Position	Event	Time	Notes
2017	European U20 Championships	(Italy) Grosseto	2nd	400 metres hurdles	50.34	PB
2017	European U20 Championships	(Italy) Grosseto	1st	4 × 400 metres relay	3:08.68	WJL
2018	World U20 Championships	(Finland) Tampere	8th	400 metres hurdles	52.38	
2018	World U20 Championships	(Finland) Tampere	1st	4 × 400 metres relay	3:04.05	WJL, AJR
2021	2020 Olympic Games	(Japan) Tokyo	8th	400 metres hurdles	48.77	
2024	2024 European Championships	(Italy) Rome	2nd	400 metres hurdles	47.50	NR

== National titles ==
Sibilio won two national championships at individual senior level.

- Italian Athletics Championships
  - 400 m hs: 2019, 2021 (2)
  - 4 × 400 m relay: 2019

== See also ==
- List of Italian records in athletics
- Italy at the 2019 IAAF World Relays
- List of European junior records in athletics
- Italian all-time lists - 400 metres hurdles
