= List of Botswana records in athletics =

The following are the national records in athletics in Botswana maintained by its national athletics federation: Botswana Athletics Association (BAA).

== Outdoor ==
Key: Awaiting ratification Record not kept by BAA Not ratified or later rescined by BAA

=== Men ===
Event	Record	Athlete	Date	Meet	Place	Ref.
100 m	9.86 (+1.0 m/s)	Letsile Tebogo	4 August 2024	Olympic Games	Saint-Denis, France	
150 m	16.09 (+0.5 m/s)	Thalosang Tshireletso	25 January 2022	ACNW Open Meeting	Potchefstroom, South Africa	
200 m	19.46 (+0.4 m/s)	Letsile Tebogo	8 August 2024	Olympic Games	Saint-Denis, France	
300 m	30.69 A	Letsile Tebogo	17 February 2024	Simbine Curro Classic Shoot-Out	Pretoria, South Africa	
400 m	43.39	Collen Kebinatshipi	12 September 2026	World Athletics Ultimate Championship	Budapest, Hungary	
500 m (road)	59.26	Nijel Amos	9 September 2017	Great City Games	Newcastle, Great Britain	
600 m	1:14.92	Masilo Boitumelo	11 March 2023	Athletics Central North West Championships	Potchefstroom, South Africa	
800 m	1:41.73	Nijel Amos	9 August 2012	Olympic Games	London, United Kingdom	
1000 m	2:19.19	Mbiganyi Thee	20 January 1990		Auckland, New Zealand	
1500 m	3:39.60	Glody Dube	24 May 2001		Nijmegen, Netherlands	
3000 m	7:51.8 h	Matthews Motshwarateu	15 February 1979		Stellenbosch, South Africa	
5000 m	13:29.6 h	Matthews Motshwarateu	14 April 1978		Stellenbosch, South Africa	
10,000 m	27:48.2 h	Matthews Motshwarateu	7 May 1979		Stellenbosch, South Africa	
10 km (road)	28:00	Matthews Motshwarateu	4 October 1980		Purchase, United States	
15 km (road)	43:20	Matthews Motshwarateu	31 August 1992		East London, South Africa	
Half marathon	1:01:21	Matthews Motshwarateu	23 July 1989		Durban, South Africa	
Marathon	2:14:57	James John	25 July 2004		Selebi-Phikwe, Botswana	
110 m hurdles	13.92 A (+0.5 m/s)	Kemorena Tisang	6 July 2019	CAA Southern Region Championships	Réduit, Mauritius	
110 m hurdles	13.92 A (−0.9 m/s)	Kemorena Tisang	14 March 2020	University of Botswana Athletics Club Track Meet	Gaborone, Botswana	
110 m hurdles	13.90 A	Kemorena Tisang	17 May 2024	Botswana Championships	Gaborone, Botswana	
400 m hurdles	49.80 A	Victor Ntweng	12 March 2022		Gaborone, Botswana	
400 m hurdles	48.59 A	Kemorena Tisang	31 May 2025	Kip Keino Classic	Nairobi, Kenya	
3000 m steeplechase	8:44.1 h	Reuben Rathedi	29 May 1981		Wichita, United States	
High jump	2.34 m	Kabelo Kgosiemang	4 May 2008	African Championships	Addis Ababa, Ethiopia	
Pole vault	2.80 m A (Note: record set during decathlon competition)	Gobe Khanda	13 May 2011	African Junior Championships	Gaborone, Botswana	
Long jump	8.27 m (+0.9 m/s)	Gable Garenamotse	20 August 2006		Rhede, Germany	
Triple jump	16.20 m (−1.0 m/s)	Thalosang Tshireletso	27 March 2021	CGA Championships	Boksburg, South Africa	
Triple jump	16.66 m A (±0.0 m/s)	Gable Garenamotse	3 July 1999		Gaborone, Botswana	
Triple jump	16.77 m (+1.9 m/s)	Thalosang Tshireletso	15 May 2022	Botswana Championships	Francistown, Botswana	
Triple jump	16.65 m (±0.0 m/s)	Thalosang Tshireletso	11 June 2022	African Championships	Saint Pierre, Mauritius	
Shot put	13.75 m A	Omphile Phokoje	31 May 2015		Gaborone, Botswana	
Discus throw	46.50 m	Tonic Taubobong	12 June 2010		Molepolole, Botswana	
Hammer throw	24.94 m A	Jeffrey Dambe	25 July 1987		Gaborone, Botswana	
Javelin throw	80.49 m A	Adriaan Stephanus Beukes	31 May 2015		Gaborone, Botswana	
Decathlon	5886 pts A	Gobe Khanda	12–13 May 2011	African Junior Championships	Gaborone, Botswana	
Decathlon	100m (wind) / Long jump (wind) / Shot put / High jump / 400m / 110m H (wind) / Discus / Pole vault / Javelin / 1500m; 11.14 (+0.1 m/s) / 6.88 m (−0.1 m/s) / 10.69 m / 1.90 m / 52.39 / 14.74 (−1.1 m/s) / 26.25 m / 2.80 m / 31.12 m / 5:24.71					
20 km walk (road)						
50 km walk (road)						
4 × 100 m relay	37.96	Botswana; Jayson Game Mandoze; Prince Phaezel Selepe; Godiraone Lobatlamang; Letsile Tebogo	2 May 2026	World Relays	Gaborene, Botswana	
4 × 400 m relay	2:54.47	Botswana; Lee Eppie; Letsile Tebogo; Bayapo Ndori; Collen Kebinatshipi	3 May 2026	World Relays	Gaborene, Botswana	

=== Women ===
Event	Record	Athlete	Date	Meet	Place	Ref.
100 m	11.24 A (+0.4 m/s)	Leungo Matlhaku	20 February 2021	Sports View meet	Gaborone, Botswana	
200 m	22.89 (±0.0 m/s)	Amantle Montsho	3 May 2012	Shizuoka International Meet	Fukuroi, Japan	
300 m	37.44	Amantle Montsho	28 March 2017	Sasol-NWU International Meeting	Sasolburg, South Africa	
400 m	49.33	Amantle Montsho	19 July 2013	Herculis	Fontvieille, Monaco	
800 m	1:56.76	Oratile Nowe	16 August 2025	Kamila Skolimowska Memorial	Chorzów, Poland	
1500 m	4:11.50 A	Oratile Nowe	15 February 2025	AGN Track & Field 3( U16, U18, U20 & Seniors)	Pretoria, South Africa	
3000 m	9:45.58	Idah Simon	30 May 2010	Southern Africa Region Junior Championships	Maputo, Mozambique	
5000 m	16:24.10	Onneile Dintwe	6 February 2009		Durban, South Africa	
10,000 m	39:41.52	Onkemetse Solotate	6 September 2003		Windhoek, Namibia	
10 km (road)	34:17	Onneille Dintwe	8 February 2009		Durban, South Africa	
Marathon	2:51:32	Onkemetse Solotate	10 February 2008		Durban, South Africa	
100 m hurdles	13.66 (+1.3 m/s)	Oarabile Babolayi	16 May 2015	Missouri Valley Conference Championships	Normal, United States	
400 m hurdles	1:00.35	Oarabile Babolayi	15 December 2010		Manzini, Swaziland	
3000 m steeplechase	10:32.15	Onneille Dintwe	10 April 2011	Yellow Pages Championships	Durban, South Africa	
High jump	1.69 m	Martha Nthshambiwe	12 June 2010		Molepolole, Botswana	
Pole vault						
Long jump	6.36 m	Tsoseletso Nkala	18 July 1998		Harare, Zimbabwe	
Triple jump	12.78 m A (+1.8 m/s)	Titose Chilume	29 April 2018	International Meet	Gaborone, Botswana	
Shot put	10.69 m A	T. Matale	19 July 1988		Gaborone, Botswana	
Discus throw	34.98 m A	Tebogo Tapologo	31 May 2015		Gaborone, Botswana	
Hammer throw	25.94 m A	Andina Tapaphiwa	14 May 2011	African Junior Championships	Gaborone, Botswana	
Javelin throw	44.61 m A	Lefitile Kenaope	2 June 2013		Gaborone, Botswana	
Heptathlon	4509 pts	Bonolo Maretele	10–11 April 2010	Meeting International de Maurice	Réduit, Mauritius	
Heptathlon	100m H (wind) / High jump / Shot put / 200m (wind) / Long jump (wind) / Javelin / 800m; 14.55 / 1.54 m / 9.32 m / 26.26 / 5.57 m / 24.45 m / 2:38.60					
20 km walk (road)						
4 × 100 m relay	46.10	Botswana; Ontiretse Molapisi; Lydia Jele; Loungo Mathlaku; Goitseone Seleka	24 June 2016	African Championships	Durban, South Africa	
4 × 400 m relay	3:26.86	Botswana; Galefele Moroko; Christine Botlogetswe; Loungo Matlhaku; Amantle Montsho	14 April 2018	Commonwealth Games	Gold Coast, Australia	

=== Mixed ===
Event	Record	Athlete	Date	Meet	Place	Ref.
4 × 400 m relay	3:13.99	Botswana; Collen Kebinatshipi; Lydia Jele; Bayapo Ndori; Obakeng Kamberuka	19 March 2024	African Games	Accra, Ghana	

== Indoor ==
=== Men ===
Event	Record	Athlete	Date	Meet	Place	Ref.
60 m	6.84	Obakeng Ngwigwa	7 March 2008		Charleston, United States	
60 m	6.62	Stephen Abosi	19 March 2022	World Championships	Belgrade, Serbia	
60 m	6.61	Stephen Abosi	19 March 2022	World Championships	Belgrade, Serbia	
200 m	21.36	Garologelwang Masheto	1 March 2009		College Station, United States	
400 m	45.74	California Molefe	10 March 2006	World Championships	Moscow, Russia	
500 m	1:00.71	Onkabetse Nkobolo	17 February 2016	Globen Galan	Stockholm, Sweden	
800 m	1:46.13	Otukile Lekote	10 March 2001	NCAA Division I Championships	Fayetteville, United States	
800 m	1:45.56	Tshepiso Masalela	3 February 2024	Meeting Metz Moselle Athlélor	Metz, France	
1500 m	3:44.33	Mbiganyi Thee	6 March 1987	World Championships	Indianapolis, United States	
3000 m	8:13.54	Matthews Motshwarateu	10 February 1984		Boston, United States	
60 m hurdles	9.12	Calvin Dikomane	17 January 2015		Montpellier, France	
High jump	2.28 m	Kabelo Kgosiemang	6 February 2010	Hochsprung mit Musik	Arnstadt, Germany	
High jump	2.28 m	Kabelo Kgosiemang	14 March 2010	World Championships	Doha, Qatar	
Pole vault						
Long jump	8.01 m	Gable Garenamotse	3 February 2002		Cardiff, United Kingdom	
Triple jump	16.00 m	Goabaone Mosheleketi	8 December 2017	Winter Break Meet	Indianapolis, United States	
Shot put						
Heptathlon						
Heptathlon	60m / Long jump / Shot put / High jump / 60m H / Pole vault / 1000m					
5000 m walk						
4 × 400 m relay	3:13.21	Botswana; Thapelo Ketlogetswe; Isaac Makwala; Pako Seribe; Zacharia Kamberuka	10 March 2012	World Championships	Istanbul, Turkey	

=== Women ===
Event	Record	Athlete	Date	Meet	Place	Ref.
60 m						
200 m						
300 m	36.33	Amantle Montsho	5 March 2010	Meeting Pas de Calais	Liévin, France	
400 m	52.34	Amantle Montsho	12 March 2010	World Championships	Doha, Qatar	
600 m	1:34.32	Oarabile Babolayi	18 January 2013	Missouri Invitational	Columbia, United States	
800 m						
1500 m						
3000 m						
55 m hurdles	8.43	Oarabile Babolayi	2 December 2012	Arkansas State Kickoff Classic	Jonesboro, United States	
60 m hurdles	8.51	Oarabile Babolayi	1 March 2015	Missouri Valley Conference Championships	Cedar Falls, United States	
High jump						
Pole vault						
Long jump						
Triple jump						
Shot put						
Pentathlon						
Pentathlon	60m H / High jump / Shot put / Long jump / 800m					
3000 m walk						
4 × 400 m relay						
