= 2026 World Athletics Ultimate Championship – Men's 400 metres hurdles =

Men's 400 metres hurdles at the 2026 World Athletics Ultimate Championship
- Venue: National Athletics Centre
- Location: Budapest, Hungary
- Dates: 12 September 2026 (semi-finals); 13 September 2026 (final)
- Competitors: 16 from 11 nations
- Winning time: 45.98 s

Champion
- Alison dos Santos; Brazil

The men's 400 metres hurdles was held over two rounds at the 2026 World Athletics Ultimate Championship at the National Athletics Centre in Budapest, Hungary on 12 and 13 September 2026. It was the first time the World Ultimate Championship is held. Athletes qualified by wildcard or by their world ranking.

== Background ==
Global records before the 2026 World Athletics Ultimate Championship
Record	Time	Athlete (nation)	Location	Date
World record	45.94	Karsten Warholm (NOR)	Tokyo, Japan	3 August 2021
World record	45.80 (Note: Awaiting ratification as the world record.)	Alison dos Santos (BRA)	Zurich, Switzerland	27 August 2026
World lead	45.80	Alison dos Santos (BRA)	Zurich, Switzerland	27 August 2026

Area records before the 2026 World Athletics Ultimate Championship
Record	Time	Athlete (nation)	Location	Date
African record	47.10	Samuel Matete (ZAM)	Zürich, Switzerland	7 August 1991
Asian record	46.98	Abderrahman Samba (QAT)	Paris, France	30 June 2018
European record	45.94	Karsten Warholm (NOR)	Tokyo, Japan	3 August 2021
North, Central American, and Caribbean record	46.17	Rai Benjamin (USA)	Tokyo, Japan	3 August 2021
Oceanian record	48.28	Rohan Robinson (AUS)	Atlanta, United States	31 July 1996
South American record	45.80	Alison dos Santos (BRA)	Zurich, Switzerland	27 August 2026

== Qualification ==
For the 400 metres hurdles, sixteen athletes qualified, up to three by wildcard for winners of the event at the 2024 Summer Olympic, the 2025 World Athletics Championships, or the 2026 Diamond League final and the others by their position at the World Athletics Rankings for the event on 3 September 2026.

== Results ==
=== Semi-finals ===
The semi-finals were held on 12 September at 19:57 (UTC+2). First 4 of each heat (Q) qualified to the final.

==== Heat 1 ====
Place	Lane	Athlete	Nation	Time	Notes
1	6	Alison dos Santos	Brazil	47.25	Q
2	3	Rai Benjamin	United States	47.49	Q
3	5	Emil Agyekum	Germany	47.75	Q
4	7	Abderrahman Samba	Qatar	47.83	Q
5	2	Oskar Edlund	Sweden	48.13	
6	9	Matic Ian Guček	Slovenia	48.17	
7	4	Yeral Núñez	Dominican Republic	48.27	
8	8	Trevor Bassitt	United States	48.59	

==== Heat 2 ====
Place	Lane	Athlete	Nation	Time	Notes
1	5	Karsten Warholm	Norway	47.68	Q
2	6	Ezekiel Nathaniel	Nigeria	47.75	Q
3	7	Matheus Lima	Brazil	47.91	Q
4	9	İsmail Nezir	Turkey	48.01	Q, PB
5	4	Bassem Hemeida	Qatar	48.12	
6	3	Kemorena Tisang	Botswana	49.21	
	2	Owe Fischer-Breiholz	Germany	DQ	TR17.2.3
	8	Caleb Dean	United States	DNS	

=== Final ===
The final was held on 13 September at 18:36 (UTC+2).

Place	Lane	Athlete	Nation	Time	Notes
1st place, gold medalist(s)	7	Alison dos Santos	Brazil	45.98	
2	6	Rai Benjamin	United States	46.40	SB
3	8	Karsten Warholm	Norway	46.78	
4	9	Emil Agyekum	Germany	47.10	NR
5	3	Abderrahman Samba	Qatar	47.78	
6	5	Ezekiel Nathaniel	Nigeria	48.23	
7	4	Matheus Lima	Brazil	48.67	
8	2	İsmail Nezir	Turkey	49.04	
