= 2021 World Athletics U20 Championships – Men's 400 metres hurdles =

Men's 400 metres hurdles at the 2021 World Athletics U20 Championships
- Venue: Kasarani Stadium
- Dates: 19 August (heats); 21 August (semifinals); 22 August (final)
- Competitors: 29 from 23 nations
- Winning time: 49.38

Medalists
gold medal	Berke Akçam	Turkey
silver medal	Denis Novoseltsev	Authorised Neutral Athletes
bronze medal	Devontie Archer	Jamaica

The men's 400 metres hurdles at the 2021 World Athletics U20 Championships was held at the Kasarani Stadium on 19, 21 and 22 August.

== Records ==
Standing records prior to the 2021 World Athletics U20 Championships
World U20 Record	Danny Harris (USA)	48.02	Los Angeles, United States	17 June 1984
Championship Record	Kerron Clement (USA)	48.51	Grosseto, Italy	16 July 2004
World U20 Leading	Sean Burrell (USA)	47.85	Eugene, United States	11 June 2021

== Results ==
=== Heats ===
Qualification: First 4 of each heat (Q) and the 4 fastest times (q) qualified for the semifinals.

Rank	Heat	Name	Nationality	Time	Note
1	2	Denis Novoseltsev	Authorised Neutral Athletes	50.88	Q
2	1	Roshawn Clarke	Jamaica	50.93	Q, PB
3	1	Matic Ian Guček	Slovenia	51.27	Q
4	2	Peter Kithome	Kenya	51.31	Q, PB
5	1	Alocias Kipngetich	Kenya	51.41	Q, PB
6	1	Ezekiel Nathaniel	Nigeria	51.63	Q, PB
7	4	Devontie Archer	Jamaica	52.17	Q
8	4	Gabriel Alves dos Santos	Brazil	52.25	Q, PB
9	3	Berke Akçam	Turkey	52.40	Q
10	3	Dmitrijs Ļašenko	Latvia	52.57	Q
11	4	Jakub Sobura-Durma	Poland	52.58	Q
12	4	Amir Moghaddami	Iran	52.68	Q, PB
13	3	Jorge García	Spain	52.73	Q
14	5	Oskar Edlund	Sweden	52.77	Q
15	4	Árpád Bánóczy	Hungary	52.79	q, PB
16	5	Neider Abello	Colombia	52.87	Q
17	2	Christiaan Venter	South Africa	52.91	Q
18	4	Marc Anthony Ibrahim	Lebanon	52.95	q
19	3	Dominik Škorjanc	Croatia	52.97	Q
20	2	Stjepan Jan Cik	Croatia	53.21	Q
21	3	Rostyslav Holubovych	Ukraine	53.35	q
22	2	César Parra	Venezuela	53.47	q
23	5	Danial Bibak	Iran	54.27	Q
24	5	Rohan Gautam Kamble	India	55.00	Q
25	2	Samuel Ibáñez	El Salvador	57.03	
26	1	Hardeep Kumar	India	1:12.80	
	5	Amar Ebed	Qatar	DQ	TR16.8
	1	Ismail Doudai Abakar	Qatar	DQ	TR17.3.1
	3	Dhahir Ali Al-Hamd	Iraq	DQ	TR17.3.1
	3	Dillon Leacock	Trinidad and Tobago	DNS	
	4	Andre Erasmus	South Africa	DNS	
	2	Michal Krátký	Czech Republic	DNS	
	5	Saad Hinti	Morocco	DNS	

=== Semifinals ===
Qualification: First 2 of each heat (Q) and the 2 fastest times (q) qualified for the final.

Rank	Heat	Name	Nationality	Time	Note
1	1	Berke Akçam	Turkey	49.73	Q, NU20R
2	1	Devontie Archer	Jamaica	49.93	Q, PB
3	2	Denis Novoseltsev	Authorised Neutral Athletes	50.31	Q, PB
4	2	Matic Ian Guček	Slovenia	50.56	Q, PB
5	3	Oskar Edlund	Sweden	50.70	Q, SB
6	2	Peter Kithome	Kenya	50.90	q, PB
7	1	Ezekiel Nathaniel	Nigeria	51.39	q, PB
8	2	Dominik Škorjanc	Croatia	51.63	
9	3	Stjepan Jan Cik	Croatia	51.83	Q
10	1	Marc Anthony Ibrahim	Lebanon	51.90	NU20R
11	3	Alocias Kipngetich	Kenya	51.93	
12	3	Roshawn Clarke	Jamaica	51.95	
13	2	Jakub Sobura-Durma	Poland	51.99	
14	2	César Parra	Venezuela	52.12	PB
15	1	Neider Abello	Colombia	52.34	PB
16	3	Amir Moghaddami	Iran	52.40	PB
17	1	Dmitrijs Ļašenko	Latvia	52.49	
18	2	Rohan Gautam Kamble	India	52.88	
19	1	Árpád Bánóczy	Hungary	53.47	
20	3	Rostyslav Holubovych	Ukraine	54.04	
21	3	Christiaan Venter	South Africa	54.71	
22	3	Gabriel Alves dos Santos	Brazil	56.09	
	1	Danial Bibak	Iran	DQ	TR17.3.1
	2	Jorge García	Spain	DQ	TR22.6.2

=== Final ===
The final was held on 22 August at 15:00. Swedish athlete Oskar Edlund crossed the line first in a time of 49.20 seconds, but was later disqualified for pulling one of his legs outside his lane to clear a hurdle.

Rank	Lane	Name	Nationality	Time	Note
1st place, gold medalist(s)	3	Berke Akçam	Turkey	49.38	NU20R
2nd place, silver medalist(s)	6	Denis Novoseltsev	Authorised Neutral Athletes	49.62	PB
3rd place, bronze medalist(s)	5	Devontie Archer	Jamaica	49.78	PB
4	1	Ezekiel Nathaniel	Nigeria	49.89	PB
5	8	Matic Ian Guček	Slovenia	50.80	
6	2	Peter Kithome	Kenya	50.94	
7	7	Stjepan Jan Cik	Croatia	52.60	
	4	Oskar Edlund	Sweden	DQ	TR22.6.2
