= 2022 World Athletics U20 Championships – Men's 400 metres hurdles =

Men's 400 metres hurdles at the 2022 World Athletics U20 Championships
- Venue: Estadio Olímpico Pascual Guerrero
- Dates: 3 August (heats); 4 August (semifinal); 5 August (final)
- Competitors: 49 from 35 nations
- Winning time: 48.84

Medalists
| gold medal | İsmail Nezir | Turkey |
| silver medal | Matic Ian Guček | Slovenia |
| bronze medal | Roshawn Clarke | Jamaica |

The men's 400 metres hurdles at the 2022 World Athletics U20 Championships was held at the Estadio Olímpico Pascual Guerrero in Cali, Colombia on 3, 4 and 5 August 2022.

== Records ==
U20 standing records prior to the 2022 World Athletics U20 Championships were as follows:

| Record | Athlete & Nationality | Mark | Location | Date |
|---|---|---|---|---|
| World U20 Record | Sean Burrell (USA) | 47.85 | Eugene, United States | 11 June 2021 |
| Championship Record | Kerron Clement (USA) | 48.51 | Grosseto, Italy | 16 July 2004 |
| World U20 Leading | Emmanuel Wanyonyi (KEN) | 48.42 | Lubbock, United States | 15 May 2022 |

== Results ==
=== Round 1 ===
Qualification: First 3 of each heat (Q) and the 3 fastest times (q) qualified for the semifinals.

| Rank | Heat | Name | Nationality | Time | Note |
|---|---|---|---|---|---|
| 1 | 5 | Yan Manuel Vázquez | Puerto Rico | 50.66 | Q, PB |
| 2 | 5 | Matic Ian Guček | Slovenia | 50.68 | Q |
| 3 | 2 | Roshawn Clarke | Jamaica | 50.71 | Q |
| 4 | 3 | Mimoun Abdoul Wahab | Belgium | 50.92 | Q, PB |
| 5 | 3 | Sojiro Moritaka | Japan | 51.04 | Q |
| 6 | 2 | Grant Williams | United States | 51.12 | Q |
| 7 | 2 | Onyekachukwu Okoh | Great Britain | 51.13 | Q, PB |
| 8 | 7 | İsmail Nezir | Turkey | 51.25 [.241] | Q |
| 9 | 5 | Jermaine Kleine | Netherlands | 51.25 [.247] | Q, PB |
| 10 | 1 | Ismail Doudai Abakar | Qatar | 51.29 | Q |
| 11 | 4 | Matheus Lima | Brazil | 51.34 | Q |
| 12 | 4 | Chen Jian-rong | Chinese Taipei | 51.37 | Q, SB |
| 13 | 7 | Dhanuka Darshana Katapana Mud | Sri Lanka | 51.41 | Q, NU20R |
| 14 | 4 | Owe Fischer-Breiholz | Germany | 51.45 | Q, PB |
| 15 | 1 | Peter Kithome Muthoka | Kenya | 51.52 [.511] | Q, SB |
| 16 | 4 | Daiki Ogawa | Japan | 51.52 [.514] | q |
| 17 | 7 | Sonny Gandrey | France | 51.53 | Q |
| 18 | 1 | Bruno Agustín de Genaro | Argentina | 51.59 | Q, PB |
| 19 | 7 | Riccardo Ganz | Italy | 51.96 | q |
| 20 | 7 | Azzam Ibrahim Abu Bakr | Saudi Arabia | 52.16 | q, PB |
| 21 | 2 | Diogo Barrigana | Portugal | 52.17 | PB |
| 22 | 5 | Ben Tilson | Canada | 52.20 | |
| 23 | 2 | Egbert Espinoza | Venezuela | 52.22 | |
| 24 | 6 | Antonio Forbes | Jamaica | 52.45 | Q |
| 25 | 6 | Csaba Molnár | Hungary | 52.49 | Q |
| 26 | 6 | Mahamat Abakar Abdrahman | Qatar | 52.50 [.497] | Q, PB |
| 27 | 3 | Kody Blackwood | United States | 52.50 [.500] | Q |
| 28 | 1 | Lucas Vivin | France | 52.55 | |
| 29 | 6 | Lin Chung-wei | Chinese Taipei | 52.64 | |
| 30 | 3 | Wernich van Rensburg | South Africa | 52.80 | |
| 31 | 7 | Vojtěch Cihlář | Czech Republic | 52.83 | |
| 32 | 7 | Shimar Bain | Bahamas | 52.88 | |
| 33 | 3 | Hardeep Kumar | India | 52.91 | |
| 34 | 2 | Levente Soos | Hungary | 53.02 | |
| 35 | 2 | Sebastián Mosquera | Colombia | 53.07 | |
| 36 | 6 | Luca Ostanello | Italy | 53.10 | |
| 37 | 5 | Lucca Campbell | Brazil | 53.21 | |
| 38 | 1 | Maximilian Köhler | Germany | 53.23 | |
| 39 | 4 | Nikola Kostić | Serbia | 53.26 | |
| 40 | 6 | Alocias Kipngetich | Kenya | 53.28 | |
| 41 | 5 | Ruan Oosthuizen | South Africa | 53.58 | |
| 42 | 5 | Aleks Pelcmanis | Latvia | 53.76 | |
| 43 | 3 | Ahmed Jamal Aldirawi | Iraq | 54.05 | |
| 44 | 6 | Aryan Kashyapa | India | 54.13 | |
| 45 | 4 | Mohamed Benmansour | Algeria | 54.26 | |
| 46 | 1 | Dominic Panozzo | Australia | 54.65 | |
| 47 | 3 | Samuel José Ibáñez Guevara | El Salvador | 55.11 | |
| 48 | 3 | Muhammadrizoi Mirzozoda | Tajikistan | 56.18 | |
| | 1 | Dillon Leacock | Trinidad and Tobago | DQ | TR23.7.2, TR17.4.3 |
| | 4 | Kyle Bennett | Australia | DNS | |

=== Semifinals ===
Qualification: First 2 of each heat (Q) and the 2 fastest times (q) qualified for the final.

| Rank | Heat | Name | Nationality | Time | Note |
|---|---|---|---|---|---|
| 1 | 3 | Roshawn Clarke | Jamaica | 49.35 | Q, PB |
| 2 | 3 | Ismail Doudai Abakar | Qatar | 49.48 | Q, PB |
| 3 | 3 | Matic Ian Guček | Slovenia | 49.72 | Q, NU20R |
| 4 | 2 | İsmail Nezir | Turkey | 50.12 | Q |
| 5 | 1 | Yan Manuel Vázquez | Puerto Rico | 50.37 | Q, NU20R |
| 6 | 2 | Mimoun Abdoul Wahab | Belgium | 50.45 | Q, PB |
| 7 | 1 | Sonny Gandrey | France | 50.59 | Q, PB |
| 8 | 2 | Sojiro Moritaka | Japan | 50.62 | q, PB |
| 9 | 2 | Grant Williams | United States | 50.82 | PB |
| 10 | 1 | Peter Kithome Muthoka | Kenya | 50.84 | SB |
| 11 | 1 | Bruno Agustín de Genaro | Argentina | 50.86 | NU20R |
| 12 | 2 | Onyekachukwu Okoh | Great Britain | 50.95 | PB |
| 13 | 1 | Matheus Lima | Brazil | 51.11 | |
| 14 | 3 | Kody Blackwood | United States | 51.15 | |
| 15 | 3 | Daiki Ogawa | Japan | 51.22 | |
| 16 | 2 | Jermaine Kleine | Netherlands | 51.35 | |
| 17 | 1 | Antonio Forbes | Jamaica | 51.42 | |
| 18 | 1 | Dhanuka Darshana Katapana Mud | Sri Lanka | 51.59 | |
| 19 | 3 | Owe Fischer-Breiholz | Germany | 51.65 | |
| 20 | 3 | Csaba Molnár | Hungary | 51.72 | PB |
| 21 | 2 | Riccardo Ganz | Italy | 52.58 | |
| 22 | 3 | Chen Jian-rong | Chinese Taipei | 52.61 | |
| 23 | 1 | Azzam Ibrahim Abu Bakr | Saudi Arabia | 52.63 | |
| 24 | 2 | Mahamat Abakar Abdrahman | Qatar | 52.97 | |

=== Final ===
The final was held on 5 August at 17:49.

| Rank | Lane | Name | Nationality | Time | Note |
|---|---|---|---|---|---|
| 1st place, gold medalist(s) | 5 | İsmail Nezir | Turkey | 48.84 | NU20R |
| 2nd place, silver medalist(s) | 1 | Matic Ian Guček | Slovenia | 48.91 | NR |
| 3rd place, bronze medalist(s) | 3 | Roshawn Clarke | Jamaica | 49.62 | |
| 4 | 4 | Yan Manuel Vázquez | Puerto Rico | 50.18 [.177] | NU20R |
| 5 | 6 | Ismail Doudai Abakar | Qatar | 50.18 [.179] | |
| 6 | 7 | Mimoun Abdoul Wahab | Belgium | 50.20 | PB |
| 7 | 8 | Sonny Gandrey | France | 50.86 | |
| 8 | 2 | Sojiro Moritaka | Japan | 51.23 | |
