= Athletics at the 2019 European Youth Summer Olympic Festival =

- Venue: Tofig Bahramov Stadium
- Dates: 22–27 July
- Competitors: 598 from 45 nations

Athletics at the 2019 European Youth Summer Olympic Festival was held at Tofig Bahramov Stadium, Baku, Azerbaijan from 22 to 27 July 2019.

== Medalists ==
=== Boys ===
==== Track ====
Event	Gold		Silver		Bronze	
100 m	Umut Uysal; Turkey	10.47	Matteo Melluzzo; Italy	10.48	Felix Kunstein; Germany	10.53
200 m	Federico Guglielmi; Italy	21.11	Tazana Kamanga-Dyrbak; Denmark	21.15	Oliwer Wdowik; Poland	21.26
400 m	Emil Johansson; Sweden	47.69	Patryk Grzegorzewicz; Poland	47.91	Attila Molnár; Hungary	48.09
800 m	Jakub Davidík; Czech Republic	1:51.02	Krzysztof Różnicki; Poland	1:53.01	David Carranza; Spain	1:53.38
1500 m	Jędrzej Poczwardowski; Poland	3:54.64	Adil Espasa; France	3:55.19	Fikadu González; Spain	3:55.73
3000 m	Adisu Guadie; Israel	8:35.04	Luc Le Baron; France	8:38.19	Vid Botolin; Slovenia	8:39.74
110 m hurdles	Mario Revenga; Spain	13.59	Tomáš Oberndorfer; Czech Republic	13.64	Márk Pap; Hungary	13.70
400 m hurdles	Oskar Edlund; Sweden	51.41	Ignacio Sáez; Spain	51.68	Berke Akçam; Turkey	52.30
2000 m steeplechase	Pol Oriach; Spain	5:49.56	Dzmitry Savin; Belarus	5:57.05	Giovanni Silli; Italy	5:58.06
Medley relay	Poland; Mateusz Górny; Oliwer Wdowik; Wiktor Gruzd; Patryk Grzegorzewicz; Oskar Łucki*; Maciej Kopeć*	1:53.39 CR	Sweden; Emil Carlsson; Sidney Léger; Emil Johansson; Oskar Edlund; Zion Eriksson*	1:54.03	Spain; Joaquim Rodríguez; Mario Revenga; Alejandro Guerrero; Ignacio Sáez; Fikadu González*	1:54.68
10000 m walk	Gabriele Gamba; Italy	45:15.74 CR	Paul McGrath; Spain	45:51.64	Mustafa Tekdal; Turkey	46:06.57

* Medalists who participated in heats only.

==== Field ====
Event	Gold		Silver		Bronze	
High jump	Yahor Huptar; Belarus	2.18	Paul Metayer; France	2.10	Roman Petruk; Ukraine	2.10
Pole vault	Anthony Ammirati; France	4.95	Juho Alasaari; Finland	4.90	Dzmitry Marfushkin; Belarus Jules Vanlangenaker; Belgium	4.80
Long jump	Oluwatosin Ayodeji; Austria	7.31	Alexis Duvivier; France	7.29	Tomislav Isailović; Serbia	7.26
Triple jump	Grigoris Nikolaou; Cyprus	15.45	Vladislav Aleksandrin; Russia	15.38	Simon Gore; France	15.33
Shot put	Muhamet Ramadani; Kosovo	19.75	Semen Borodayev; Russia	18.83	Jesper Ahlin; Sweden	18.71
Discus throw	Raman Khartanovich; Belarus	63.09	Steffen Melheim; Norway	59.66	Matteo Maulana; Germany	59.33
Hammer throw	Valentin Andreev; Bulgaria	82.72	Merlin Hummel; Germany	81.06	Jean-Baptiste Bruxelle; France	78.44
Javelin throw	Eryk Kołodziejczak; Poland	77.02	Giovanni Frattini; Italy	75.25	Artur Felfner; Ukraine	73.14

==== Combined ====
Event	Gold		Silver		Bronze	
Decathlon	Sander Skotheim; Norway	7761 CR	Jente Hauttekeete; Belgium	7540	Paul Kallenberg; Germany	7423

=== Girls ===
==== Track ====
Event	Gold		Silver		Bronze	
100 m	Rhasidat Adeleke; Ireland	11.70	Johanna Kylmänen; Finland	11.89	Cheyenne Kuhn; Germany	11.93
200 m	Rhasidat Adeleke; Ireland	23.92	Mira Kőszegi; Hungary	24.15	Serena Kouassi; France	24.40
400 m	Olesya Soldatova; Russia	53.57	Liefde Schoemaker; Belgium	53.85	Lakeri Ertzgaard; Norway	54.56
800 m	Sophia Volkmer; Germany	2:05.62	Valentina Rosamilia; Switzerland	2:06.30	Lucía Pinacchio; Spain	2:06.66
1500 m	Antje Pfüller; Germany	4:28.89	Maria Sfârghiu; Romania	4:29.60	Mireya Arnedillo; Spain	4:30.16
3000 m	Olimpia Breza; Poland	9:48.23	Ina Halle Haugen; Norway	9:49.54	María Forero; Spain	9:50.07
100 m hurdles	Léa Vendôme; France	13.52	Franziska Schuster; Germany	13.53	Ditaji Kambundji; Switzerland	13.63
400 m hurdles	Salma Paralluelo; Spain	57.95	Andrea Rooth; Norway	59.05	Madeline Abega; France	59.28
2000 m steeplechase	Blanka Dörfel; Germany	6:39.02 CR	Gréta Varga; Hungary	6:46.95	Sigrid Alvik; Norway	6:47.44
Medley relay	Spain; Laura Pintiel; Esperança Cladera; Carmen Avilés; Salma Paralluelo	2:08.53 CR	Greece; Markella Papandreou; Polyniki Emmanouilidou; Anna Chatzipourgani; Stela Konstantinidou	2:09.16	Switzerland; Selina Furler; Seraina Joho; Lea Ammann; Valentina Rosamilia; Debby Schenk*	2:10.32
5000 m walk	Jekaterina Mirotvortseva; Estonia	22:26.01 CR	Lizaveta Hryshkevich; Belarus	23:33.23	Alicia Lumbreras; Spain	23:43.04

* Medalists who participated in heats only.

==== Field ====
Event	Gold		Silver		Bronze	
High jump	Adelina Khalikova; Russia	1.86	Marithé Engondo; Switzerland	1.82	Styliana Ioannidou; Cyprus	1.80
Pole vault	Sarah Vogel; Germany	4.06	Clara Fernández; Spain	3.85	Klara Loessl; Denmark Rebecka Krüeger; Sweden	3.85
Long jump	Mariia Horielova; Ukraine	6.21	Mia Lien; Norway	6.15	Nea Lento; Finland	5.98
Triple jump	Maja Åskag; Sweden	13.26	Lesly Raffin; France	13.08	Iuliana Dabija; Moldova	12.98
Shot put	Pinar Akyol; Turkey	17.88	Nina Căpățînă; Moldova	17.16	Sina Prüfer; Germany	16.84
Discus throw	Violetta Ignatyeva; Russia	55.37 CR	Pia Northoff; Germany	54.38	Özlem Becerek; Turkey	53.43
Hammer throw	Silja Kosonen; Finland	72.35 CR	Rachele Mori; Italy	69.04	Esther Imariagbee; Germany	68.98
Javelin throw	Gabriela Andrukonis; Poland	58.77	Vivian Suominen; Finland	56.24	Esra Türkmen; Turkey	54.62

==== Combined ====
Event	Gold		Silver		Bronze	
Heptathlon	Saga Vanninen; Finland	5913 CR	Henriette Jæger; Norway	5835	Anastasia Dragomirova; Greece	5817

== Medal table ==
* Host nation (Azerbaijan)

Rank	Nation	Gold	Silver	Bronze	Total
1	Poland (POL)	5	2	1	8
2	Spain (ESP)	4	3	7	14
3	Germany (GER)	4	3	6	13
4	Russia (RUS)	3	2	0	5
5	Sweden (SWE)	3	1	2	6
6	France (FRA)	2	5	4	11
7	Finland (FIN)	2	3	1	6
7	Italy (ITA)	2	3	1	6
9	Belarus (BLR)	2	2	1	5
10	Turkey (TUR)	2	0	4	6
11	Ireland (IRL)	2	0	0	2
12	Norway (NOR)	1	5	2	8
13	Czech Republic (CZE)	1	1	0	2
14	Ukraine (UKR)	1	0	2	3
15	Cyprus (CYP)	1	0	1	2
16	Austria (AUT)	1	0	0	1
16	Bulgaria (BUL)	1	0	0	1
16	Estonia (EST)	1	0	0	1
16	Israel (ISR)	1	0	0	1
16	Kosovo (KOS)	1	0	0	1
21	Hungary (HUN)	0	2	2	4
21	Switzerland (SUI)	0	2	2	4
23	Belgium (BEL)	0	2	1	3
24	Denmark (DEN)	0	1	1	2
24	Greece (GRE)	0	1	1	2
24	Moldova (MDA)	0	1	1	2
27	Romania (ROU)	0	1	0	1
28	Serbia (SRB)	0	0	1	1
28	Slovenia (SLO)	0	0	1	1
Totals (29 entries)		40	40	42	122
