= 2023 European Athletics U23 Championships – Men's 400 metres hurdles =

Men's 400 metres hurdles at the 2023 European Athletics U23 Championships
- Venue: Leppävaara Stadium
- Location: Espoo, Finland
- Dates: 14 July (heats); 15 July (semi-finals); 16 July (final)
- Competitors: 28 from 21 nations
- Winning time: 49.19

Medalists
gold medal	İsmail Nezir	Turkey
silver medal	Berke Akçam	Turkey
bronze medal	Oskar Edlund	Sweden

The men's 400 metres hurdles event at the 2023 European Athletics U23 Championships was held in Espoo, Finland, at Leppävaara Stadium on 14 and 15 July.

== Records ==
Prior to the competition, the records were as follows:

European U23 record	Karsten Warholm (NOR)	47.64	Berlin, Germany	9 August 2018
Championship U23 record	Karsten Warholm (NOR)	48.37	Bydgoszcz, Poland	16 July 2017

== Results ==
=== Heats ===
First 3 in each heat (Q) and the next 4 fastest (q) advance to the semi-finals.

==== Heat 1 ====
Place	Athlete	Nation	Time	Notes
1	Berke Akçam	Turkey	51.00	Q
2	Árpád Bánóczy	Hungary	51.20	Q
3	Pablo Drees	Spain	51.25	Q
4	Clément Ducos	France	51.49	q
5	Tobias Eberhard	Switzerland	52.18	
6	Alberto Montanari	Italy	52.28	
7	Sebastian Monneret	Denmark	54.40	

==== Heat 2 ====
Place	Athlete	Nation	Time	Notes
1	İsmail Nezir	Turkey	50.86	Q
2	Fantin Crisci	France	50.96	Q
3	David Thid	Sweden	51.55	Q
4	Riccardo Berrino	Italy	51.61	q
5	Andreas Haara Bakketun	Norway	52.98	
6	Charalampos Nikolaos Charatsidis	Greece	53.23	
—	Niklas Strohmayer-Dangl	Austria	DNS	

==== Heat 3 ====
Place	Athlete	Nation	Time	Notes
1	Matic Ian Guček	Slovenia	51.18	Q
2	Karl Wållgren	Sweden	51.30	Q
3	George Seery	Great Britain	51.33	Q
4	Hugo Menin	France	51.39	q
5	Daan Kneppers	Netherlands	52.11	
6	Diogo Barrigana	Portugal	52.61	
7	Dmitrijs Ļašenko	Latvia	52.82	

==== Heat 4 ====
Place	Athlete	Nation	Time	Notes
1	Michele Bertoldo	Italy	50.37	Q
2	Oskar Edlund	Sweden	50.75	Q
3	Nahom Yirga	Switzerland	51.27	Q
4	Jaakko Linnus	Finland	51.49	q, PB
5	Leo Köhldorfer	Austria	51.84 [.837]	
6	Rostyslav Holubovych	Ukraine	51.84 [.839]	
7	Denis Bartek	Slovakia	53.79	

=== Semi-finals ===
First 3 in each heat (Q) and the next 2 fastest (q) advance to the dinal.

==== Heat 1 ====
Place	Athlete	Nation	Time	Notes
1	Matic Ian Guček	Slovenia	50.08	Q
2	Michele Bertoldo	Italy	50.12	Q
3	Berke Akçam	Turkey	50.13	Q
4	David Thid	Sweden	50.63	q, PB
5	Hugo Menin	France	50.72	
6	Karl Wållgren	Sweden	50.92	
7	Jaakko Linnus	Finland	51.41	
8	Pablo Drees	Spain	51.46	

==== Heat 2 ====
Place	Athlete	Nation	Time	Notes
1	İsmail Nezir	Turkey	50.23	Q
2	Oskar Edlund	Sweden	50.28	Q
3	Fantin Crisci	France	50.39	Q
4	Clément Ducos	France	50.57	q
5	Riccardo Berrino	Italy	51.14	PB
6	George Seery	Great Britain	51.25	
7	Nahom Yirga	Switzerland	51.98	
8	Árpád Bánóczy	Hungary	53.01	

=== Final ===
Place	Athlete	Nation	Time	Notes
1st place, gold medalist(s)	İsmail Nezir	Turkey	49.19	
2nd place, silver medalist(s)	Berke Akçam	Turkey	49.48	SB
3rd place, bronze medalist(s)	Oskar Edlund	Sweden	49.57	PB
4	Matic Ian Guček	Slovenia	49.70	
5	Michele Bertoldo	Italy	50.12	
6	David Thid	Sweden	51.10	
7	Fantin Crisci	France	51.30	
—	Clément Ducos	France	DQ	TR 22.6.1
