= Wernich van Rensburg =

South African athlete (born 2004)

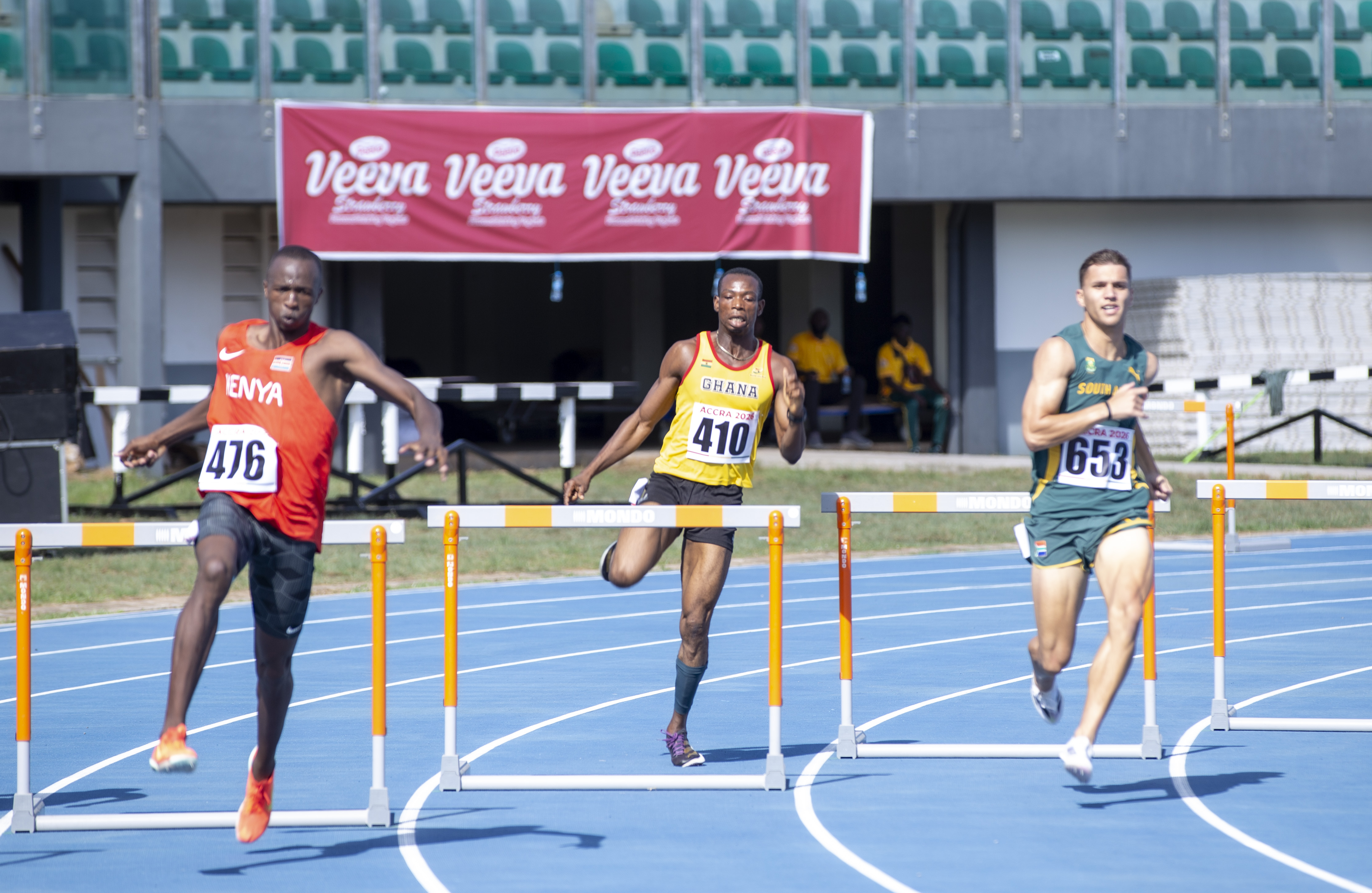
- At the 2026 African Championships

Personal information
- Nationality: South African
- Born: 28 July 2004 (age 21)

Sport
- Sport: Athletics
- Event: Hurdler

Achievements and titles
- Personal best: 400m hurdles: 49.12 (2026)
Medal record
Men's athletics
Representing South Africa
African Championships
Bronze medal – third place	2026 Accra	400 m hurdles
Summer World University Games
Silver medal – second place	2025 Bochum	4 × 400 m mixed
Bronze medal – third place	2021 Chengdu	4 × 400 m relay
African U20 Championships
Gold medal – first place	2023 Ndola	400 m hurdles
Bronze medal – third place	2023 Ndola	4 × 400 m relay

Wernich van Rensburg (born 28 July 2004) is a South African sprinter and hurdler. He won the South African national title in 2026 over 400 metres hurdles and was the bronze medalist at the 2026 African Championships in Athletics.

== Biography ==
A student at South Africa’s University of the Free State (UFS), he became South African U20 champion in Ndola, Zambia in 2023. He also won a medal with the 4 x 400 metres relay. In August 2023, he represented South Africa at the delayed 2021 Summer World University Games in Chengdu, China, and won a bronze medal with the men's 4 x 400 metres team.

In March 2025, he set a personal best 49.24 seconds to win the 400 metres hurdles at the ASA Grand Prix 2. In April 2025, he placed fourth in the 400 metres hurdles at the South African Athletics championships in Potchefstroom, running 49.90 seconds. In May, he won for UFS at the South African University Championships, in the men’s 400m hurdles, running 49.95 seconds. In July 2025, he competed as part of the South Africa team at the 2025 Summer World University Games in Bochum, Germany, winning a silver medal with the mixed 4 x 400 metres team.

In April 2026, he won the South African national title in the 400 metres hurdles at the South African Athletics championships in Stellenbosch. In May 2026, he won the bronze medal in the 400 metres hurdles at the 2026 African Championships in Athletics in Accra, Ghana, running 49.35 seconds behind Botswana pair Tisang Kemorena and Victor Ntweng.
