= Athletics at the 2021 Summer World University Games – Men's 4 × 400 metres relay =

The men's 4 × 400 metres relay event at the 2021 Summer World University Games was held on 5 and 6 August 2023 at the Shuangliu Sports Centre Stadium in Chengdu, China.

== Medalists ==
Gold	Silver	Bronze
Turkey; İlyas Çanakçı; Kubilay Ençü; Berke Akçam; İsmail Nezir	Poland; Adam Łukomski; Patryk Grzegorzewicz; Daniel Sołtysiak; Mateusz Rzeźniczak; Krzysztof Hołub; Jakub Olejniczak	South Africa; Nhlanhla Maseko; Tjaart van der Walt; Wernich van Rensburg; Lindukuhle Gora

== Results ==
=== Round 1 ===
Qualification: First 3 in each heat (Q) and the next 2 fastest (q) advance to final.

Rank	Heat	Nation	Athletes	Time	Notes
1	1	Turkey	İlyas Çanakçı, Kubilay Ençü, Berke Akçam, İsmail Nezir	3:06.43	Q
2	1	South Africa	Wernich van Rensburg, Lindukuhle Gora, Tjaart van der Walt, Nhlanhla Maseko	3:06.97	Q
3	1	Malaysia	Abdul Waify Roslan, Muhammad Firdaus bin Mohamed Zemi, Rusleen Roseli, Umar Osman	3:10.98	Q
4	2	Poland	Daniel Sołtysiak, Krzysztof Hołub, Jakub Olejniczak, Patryk Grzegorzewicz	3:11.45	Q
5	2	China	Zhou Haowen, Li Xinwang, Song Jiahui, Xie Zhiyu	3:11.48	Q
6	1	Uganda	Godfrey Chanwengo, Emmanuel Otim, Santos Okabo, Justin Eyit	3:16.67	q
7	2	Burundi	Hervé Orly Cubahiro, Léandre Hamenyimana, James Manamugabe, Billy Carl Ingabire	3:28.40	Q
–	1	India	Theerthesh Shetty, Harpreet Singh Gill, Shrinath Dalavi, Nitin Kumar	DQ	TR24.19
–	1	United States	Joseph Taylor, Kayron Johnson, Vincent Lopez, Davonte Vanterpool	DQ	TR24.19
–	1	Zambia	Patrick Banda, Innocent Kanyala, Moses Chileshe, Jonathan Musunga	DQ	TR24.19
–	2	Japan		DNS	
–	2	Kazakhstan		DNS	
–	2	Brazil		DNS	

=== Final ===
Rank	Nation	Athletes	Time	Notes
1st place, gold medalist(s)	Turkey	İlyas Çanakçı, Kubilay Ençü, Berke Akçam, İsmail Nezir	3:03.46	
2nd place, silver medalist(s)	Poland	Adam Łukomski, Patryk Grzegorzewicz, Daniel Sołtysiak, Mateusz Rzeźniczak	3:05.10	
3rd place, bronze medalist(s)	South Africa	Nhlanhla Maseko, Tjaart van der Walt, Wernich van Rensburg, Lindukuhle Gora	3:05.17	
4	China	Zhou Haowen, Li Xinwang, Xie Zhiyu, Song Jiahui	3:05.56	
5	Malaysia	Abdul Waify Roslan, Muhammad Firdaus bin Mohamed Zemi, Rusleen Roseli, Umar Osman	3:10.30	
–	Uganda	Godfrey Chanwengo, Peter Akemkwene, Santos Okabo, Justin Eyit	DQ	TR17.3.1
–	Burundi	Billy Carl Ingabire, James Manamugabe, Hervé Orly Cubahiro, Léandre Hamenyimana	DQ	TR24.7
