= Athletics at the 2023 African Games – Men's 400 metres hurdles =

Men's 400 metres hurdles at the 2023 African Games
- Venue: Legon Sports Stadium
- Location: Accra, Ghana
- Dates: 21 March (heats); 22 March (final)
- Competitors: 21 from 12 nations
- Winning time: 48.82 NR

Medalists
gold medal	Saad Hinti	Morocco
silver medal	Victor Ntweng	Botswana
bronze medal	Kemorena Tisang	Botswana

The men's 400 metres hurdles event at the 2023 African Games was held on 21 and 22 March 2024 in Accra, Ghana.

== Results ==
=== Heats ===
Qualification: First 2 in each heat (Q) and the next 2 fastest (q) advanced to the final.

Rank	Heat	Name	Nationality	Time	Notes
1	3	Wiseman Mukhobe	Kenya	49.41	Q
2	1	Victor Ntweng	Botswana	49.45	Q
3	3	Kemorena Tisang	Botswana	50.15	Q
4	2	Saad Hinti	Morocco	50.65	Q
5	2	Abdelmalik Lahoulou	Algeria	50.71	Q
6	2	Lindokuhle Gora	South Africa	50.75	q
7	1	El Mehdi Dimocrati	Morocco	50.98	Q
8	3	Ousmane Sidibé	Senegal	51.28	q
9	1	Derese Tesfaye	Ethiopia	51.39	
10	3	Samson Nathaniel	Nigeria	51.59	
11	3	Kipkorir Rotich	Kenya	51.60	
12	1	Busani Ndlovu	Zimbabwe	52.08	
13	1	Nicholas Kessio	Kenya	52.27	
14	3	Yohannes Getaneh	Ethiopia	52.64	
15	1	Peter Antiedu	Ghana	52.65	
16	3	Bienvenu Sawadogo	Burkina Faso	53.04	
17	2	Barnabas Domprey	Ghana	53.07	
18	2	Emmanuel Tamba Elengha	Republic of the Congo	53.08	
19	1	Timothee Simaga	Mali	55.17	
20	2	Geraud Houessou	Benin	55.74	
21	2	Abebe Lemecha	Ethiopia	57.28	

=== Final ===
Rank	Lane	Name	Nationality	Time	Notes
1st place, gold medalist(s)	5	Saad Hinti	Morocco	48.82	NR
2nd place, silver medalist(s)	3	Victor Ntweng	Botswana	49.38	
3rd place, bronze medalist(s)	6	Kemorena Tisang	Botswana	50.09	
4	4	Wiseman Mukhobe	Kenya	50.10	
5	1	Lindokuhle Gora	South Africa	50.13	
6	2	Abdelmalik Lahoulou	Algeria	50.34	
7	8	Ousmane Sidibé	Senegal	51.43	
8	7	El Mehdi Dimocrati	Morocco	51.47	
