= Buse Savaşkan =

Turkish Cypriot high jumper (born 1999)

Personal information
- Born: 24 February 1999 (age 27) Northern Cyprus

Sport
- Country: Turkey
- Sport: Track and field
- Event: High Jump
- Club: Enka SK
Medal record
Women's Athletics
Representing Turkey
Balkan Championships
Gold medal – first place	2024 İzmir	high jump
Bronze medal – third place	2023 Kraljevo	high jump
Bronze medal – third place	2021 Istanbul	Indoor high jump
World Continental Tour
Gold medal – first place	2024 Huelva	high jump

Buse Savaşkan (born 24 February 1999) is a Turkish Cypriot track and field athlete who competes in the high jump. Of Turkish Cypriot origin, she represents Turkey in the sport.

== Early years in sport ==
Savaşkan started her athletics career participating at the first edition of the European Athletics Youth Championship in Tbilisi, Georgia in 2016. She was eliminated with her jump over 1.75 m. In 2018, she placed second with 1.74 m at the Turkish University Championships in Adana.

She missed the finals at the 2019 European Athletics U23 Championships in Gävle, Sweden by her jump of 1.68 m.

== Sport career ==
Savaşkan is a member of Enka SK in Istanbul, Turkey. She became many times Turkish champion.

=== 2021 ===
She jumped over 1.80 m at the 2021 Balkan Athletics Indoor Championships in Istanbul, Turkey and took the bronze medal.

=== 2023 ===
At the 2023 European Athletics Team Championships in Chorzów, Poland, she placed third in the Category B with 1.87 m.

She took part at the 2023 World Athletics Continental Tour, and won the champions title in the Challenger Meeting at Białystok, Poland with 1.88 m as well as in the Bronze Meeting at Jyväskylä, Finland also with 1.88 m. She received the bronze medal at the 2023 Balkan Athletics Championships in Kraljevo, Serbia jumping over 1.89 m.

=== 2024 ===
Savaşkan jumped 1.91 m at the Wuppertaler Hochsprungmeeting in Germany, and placed third. At the Internationales Hochsprungmeeting in Berlin, Germany, Germany, she junped 1.90 m and placed second in the Bronze Meeting of the 2024 World Athletics Continental Tour. At the 2024 Balkan Athletics Championships in İzmir, Turkey, she captured the gold medal reaching 1.92 m.Jumping 1.89 m, she placed sixth at the 2024 European Athletics Championships in Rome, Italy. In 2024, she junped over 1.90 m at the Meeting Iberoamericano de Atletismo of the World Athletics Continental Tour in Huelva, Spain, and became champion.

During the Turkish Championships in 2024, she suffered a muscle tear, leaving her using crutches during recovery

Savaşkan was qualified to represent Turkey at the 2024 Summer Olympics in Paris, France.

In November, Savaşkan's next interest was reportedly in the next European Championship.

== Achievements ==
Year	Competition	Venue	Position	Notes
Representing Turkey
2021	Balkan Indoor Cahampionships	Istanbul, Turkey	3rd place, bronze medalist(s)	1.80 m
2022	Islamic Solidarity Games	Konya, Turkey	4th	1.82 m
2022	Mediterranean Games	Oran, Algeria	5th	1.84 m
2023	European Team Championships	Chorzów, Poland	(bronze); Category B	1.87 m
2023	World Athletics Continental Tour	Białystok, Poland	(gold); Challemger	1.88 m
2023	World Athletics Continental Tour	Jyväskylä, Finland	(gold); Bronze Meeting	1.88 m
2023	European Games	Kraków, Poland	4th	1.87 m
2023	Balkan Championships	Kraljevo, Serbia	3rd place, bronze medalist(s)	1.89 m
2024	Villa de Madrid Indoor Meeting	Madrid, Spain	4th	1.85 m
2024	Diamond League	Marrakesh, Morocco	4th	1.87 m
2024	Wuppertaler Hochsprungmeeting	Wuppertal, Germany	3rd place, bronze medalist(s)	1.91 m
2024	World Athletics Continental Tour	Berlin, Germany	(silver); Bronze Meeting	1.90 m
2024	Balkan Championships	İzmir, Turkey	1st place, gold medalist(s)	1.92 m
2024	European Championships	Rome, Italy	6th	1.89 m
2024	World Athletics Continental Tour	Huelva, Spain	(gold); Category C	1.90 m
2024	Olympic Games	Paris, France	10th	1.95 m

== Personal life ==
Buse Savaşkan was born in Northern Cyprus to Faika and İlhan Savaşkan on 24 February 1999. Since 2017, she has been living in Turkey away from her family.

She studies sports coaching at the Cyprus Health and Social Sciences University in Güzelyurt District, Northern Cyprus.
