= Clément Ducos =

French athlete (born 2001)

Clement Ducos
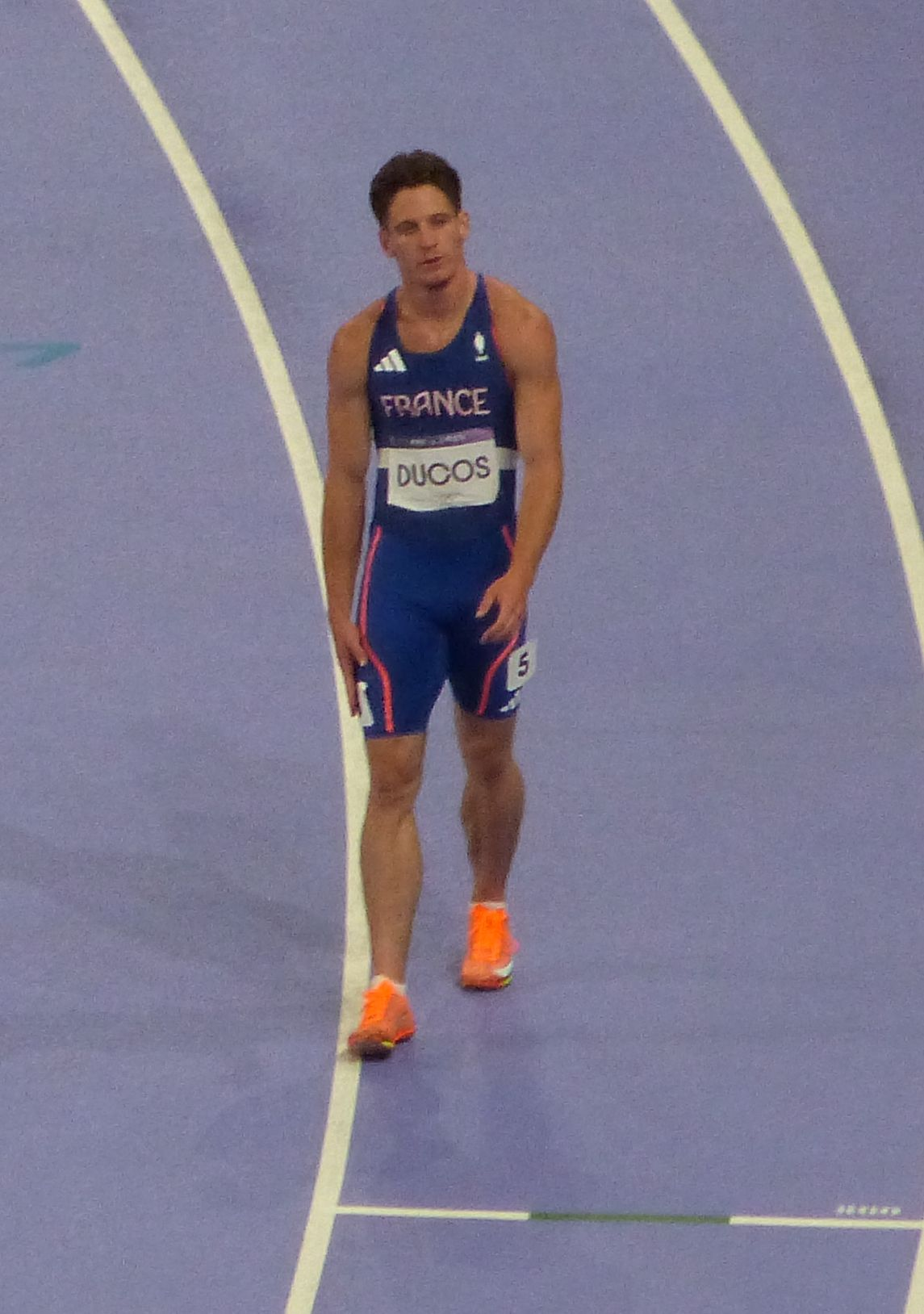

Personal information
- Nationality: French
- Born: 4 March 2001 (age 25)

Sport
- Sport: Athletics
- Event: Hurdles

Achievements and titles
- Personal bests: 400m: 46.79 (Orlando, 2023); 400m hurdles: 47.42 (Chorzow, 2024)

Clément Ducos (born 4 March 2001) is a French hurdler. He finished 4th in the 400 metres hurdles at the 2024 Summer Olympics.

== Early life ==
From Bordeaux, he is a member of Bordeaux Etudiant Club.

== Career ==
Ducos reached the final of the 400m hurdles at the 2017 European Youth Olympic Festival in Győr, Hungary.

Ducos was a surprise winner of the French national indoor championships in 2022 over 400 metres. He was selected for the 400 metres hurdles at the 2023 European Athletics U23 Championships.

On 5 April 2024, in Knoxville, United States, he set a new personal best in the 400 m hurdles of 49.03 seconds. The following week, in Gainesville, United States he improved his personal best by going under 49 seconds for the first time. His time of 48.26 seconds placed him as the 5th best French performer of all time in the 400m hurdles and achieved the qualifying standard for the 2024 Paris Olympics.

Ducos ran at the SEC Outdoor Championships in May 2024, and was times at 47.69 for the 400m hurdles but was disqualified for a lane infringement. He ran 48.64 to qualify for the final of the NCAA Outdoor Championships in Eugene, United States on 5 June 2024.

He competed at the 2024 Summer Olympics in Paris in August 2024. He broke his personal best for the 400 metres hurdles in reaching the final, and placed fourth overall.

In September 2024, it was announced that he had signed up for the inaugural season of the Michael Johnson founded Grand Slam Track in the Long Hurdles category.

== Personal life ==
Ducos attended the University of Tennessee in the United States.

== Statistics ==
Grand Slam Track results
Slam	Race group	Event	Pl.	Time	Prize money
2025 Kingston Slam	Long hurdles	400 m hurdles		DQ	
2025 Kingston Slam	Long hurdles	400 m		DNS	
2025 Philadelphia Slam	Long hurdles	400 m hurdles	8th	50.53	US$10,000
2025 Philadelphia Slam	Long hurdles	400 m	7th	47.59	US$10,000
