= 2021 Balkan Athletics Indoor Championships =

- Dates: 20 February
- Host city: Istanbul, Turkey
- Venue: Ataköy Athletics Arena
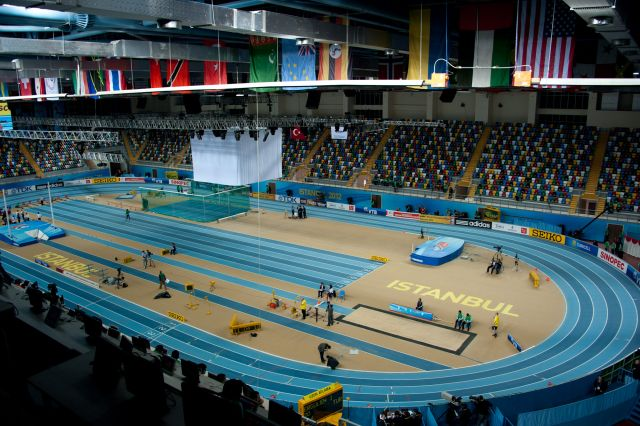
- Level: Senior
- Events: 24
- Participation: 21 nations

The 2021 Balkan Athletics Indoor Championships was the 26th edition of the annual indoor track and field competition for athletes from the Balkans, organised by Balkan Athletics. It was held on 20 February at the Ataköy Athletics Arena in Istanbul, Turkey.

== Medal summary ==
=== Men ===
Event	Gold		Silver		Bronze	
60 m	Kayhan Özer; Turkey	6.69	Oleksandr Sokolov; Ukraine	6.72	Stanislav Kovalenko; Ukraine	6.75
400 m	İlyas Çanakçı; Turkey	46.91 PB	Franko Burraj; Albania	47.00 SB	Luka Janežič; Slovenia	47.16 SB
800 m	Oleh Myronets; Ukraine	1:48.19 PB	Žan Rudolf; Slovenia	1:48.29 SB	Abedin Mujezinović; Bosnia and Herzegovina	1:49.60
1500 m	Mitko Tsenov; Bulgaria	3:45.97	Nikola Bursać; Serbia	3:46.91 SB	Yuriy Kishchenko; Ukraine	3:46.97 SB
3000 m	Dario Ivanovski; Moldova	8:03.95 SB	Cihat Ulus; Turkey	8:10.69 PB	Vid Botolin; Slovenia	8:10.76 PB
60 m hurdles	Mikdat Sevler; Turkey	7.77	Stanislav Stankov; Bulgaria	7.80	Bohdan Chornomaz; Ukraine	7.89
4 × 400 m relay	Turkey; Akın Özyürek; İsmail Nezir; Ali Aksu; Oğuzhan Kaya	3:13.70	Romania; Vlad Dulcescu; Mihai Dringo; Cristian Voicu; Denis Toma	3:16.09	Bulgaria; Silyan Peshev; Velin Kovalenko; Alex Vassilev; Yordan Gyurov	3:18.28
High jump	Tihomir Ivanov; Bulgaria	2.25 =SB	Enes Talha Şenses; Turkey	2.15	Alperen Acet; Turkey	2.10
Pole vault	Ersu Şaşma; Turkey	5.60	Vladyslav Malykhin; Ukraine	5.50 =SB	Ivan Yeryomin; Ukraine	5.40
Long jump	Izmir Smajlaj; Albania	7.91 SB	Gabriel Bitan; Romania	7.90	Marko Čeko; Croatia	7.72
Triple jump	Nazim Babayev; Azerbaijan	16.57 SB	Nikolaos Andrikopoulos; Greece	16.39 PB	Dimitrios Tsiamis; Greece	16.29
Shot put	Armin Sinančević; Serbia	20.63 SB	Mesud Pezer; Bosnia and Herzegovina	20.07	Andrei Toader; Romania	19.87

=== Women ===
Event	Gold		Silver		Bronze	
60 m	Inna Eftimova; Bulgaria	7.33	Marina Baboi; Romania	7.40	Milana Tirnanić; Serbia	7.41
400 m	Andrea Miklós; Romania	51.92 PB	Anna Ryzhykova; Ukraine	52.38 PB	Anita Horvat; Slovenia	53.44 SB
800 m	Svitlana Zhulzhyk; Ukraine	2:05.84	Claudia Bobocea; Romania	2:06.05 SB	Jerneja Smonkar; Slovenia	2:06.85
1500 m	Maruša Mišmaš-Zrimšek; Slovenia	4:09.43 SB	Orysya Demyanyuk; Ukraine	4:17.19 SB	Claudia Bobocea; Romania	4:17.47 SB
3000 m	Klara Lukan; Slovenia	8:58.73 PB	Roxana Rotaru; Romania	9:10.26 SB	Burcu Subatan; Turkey	9:15.53 PB
60 m hurdles	Anamaria Nesteriuc; Romania	8.18	Hanna Plotitsyna; Ukraine	8.19	Ivana Lončarek; Croatia	8.24 SB
4 × 400 m relay	Ukraine; Alina Lohvynenko; Viktoriya Tkachuk; Anastasiia Bryzhina; Anna Ryzhykova	3:38.16	Turkey; Elif Polat; Nevin İnce; Zeynep Kuran; Emel Şanlı-Kırçın	3:41.25	Slovenia; Maja Pogorevc; Veronika Sadek; Maruša Mišmaš-Zrimšek; Anita Horvat	3:41.50 NR
High jump	Marija Vuković; Montenegro	1.90	Lia Apostolovski; Slovenia	1.85	Buse Savaşkan; Turkey	1.80
Pole vault	Yana Hladiychuk; Ukraine	4.60	Maryna Kylypko; Ukraine	4.50 SB	Mesure Tutku Yılmaz; Turkey	4.40 NR
Long jump	Ivana Španović; Serbia	6.75 SB	Filippa Fotopoulou; Cyprus	6.53 NR	Florentina Iusco; Romania	6.50 =SB
Triple jump	Tuğba Danışmaz; Turkey	13.97 NR	Neja Filipič; Slovenia	13.86	Diana Ion; Romania	13.47
Shot put	Emel Dereli; Turkey	18.13 SB	Pınar Akyol; Turkey	16.02	Andreea Huzum-Vitan; Romania	15.03 SB

== Medal table ==
The host country is highlighted in lavender blue

Rank	Nation	Gold	Silver	Bronze	Total
1	Turkey*	7	4	4	15
2	Ukraine	4	6	4	14
3	Bulgaria	3	1	1	5
4	Romania	2	5	5	12
5	Slovenia	2	3	5	10
6	Serbia	2	1	1	4
7	Albania	1	1	0	2
8	Azerbaijan	1	0	0	1
8	Moldova	1	0	0	1
8	Montenegro	1	0	0	1
11	Bosnia and Herzegovina	0	1	1	2
11	Greece	0	1	1	2
13	Cyprus	0	1	0	1
14	Croatia	0	0	2	2
Totals (14 entries)		24	24	24	72
