= 2026 African Championships in Athletics – Men's 400 metres hurdles =

Men's 400 metres hurdles at the 2026 African Championships in Athletics
- Venue: Legon Sports Stadium
- Location: Accra, Ghana
- Dates: 12–14 May
- Winning time: 48.66

Medalists
gold medal	Kemorena Tisang	Botswana
silver medal	Victor Ntweng	Botswana
bronze medal	Wernich van Rensburg	South Africa

The men's 400 metres hurdles event at the 2026 African Championships in Athletics was held on 12 and 14 May in Accra, Ghana.

== Results ==
=== Heats ===
First 3 of each heat (Q) and the next 2 fastest (q) qualified for the final.

Rank	Heat	Athlete	Nationality	Time	Notes
1	2	Kipkorir Rotich	Kenya	49.22	Q
2	2	Victor Ntweng	Botswana	49.72	Q
3	1	Kemorena Tisang	Botswana	50.01	Q
4	1	Baba Seidu Mohammed	Ghana	51.06	Q
5	1	Edward Ngunjiri	Kenya	51.31	Q
6	2	Wernich van Rensburg	South Africa	50.36	Q
7	2	El Mehdi Dimokrati	Morocco	50.83	q
8	1	Zegue Badra Ali Berte	Burkina Faso	51.92	q
9	2	Osborn Turkson	Ghana	52.11	
10	1	Getahun Tadese	Ethiopia	53.31	
11	1	Ibrahim Adamou Mahmat Sani	Chad	54.31	
	2	Emmanuel Tamba Elenga	Republic of the Congo	DNS	

=== Final ===
Rank	Heat	Athlete	Nationality	Time	Notes
1st place, gold medalist(s)	6	Kemorena Tisang	Botswana	48.66	
2nd place, silver medalist(s)	7	Victor Ntweng	Botswana	49.21	
3rd place, bronze medalist(s)	3	Wernich van Rensburg	South Africa	49.35	
4	8	El Mehdi Dimokrati	Morocco	50.29	
5	4	Baba Seidu Mohammed	Ghana	51.29	
6	1	Zegue Badra Ali Berte	Burkina Faso	51.49	
7	2	Edward Ngunjiri	Kenya	51.49	
8	5	Kipkorir Rotich	Kenya	1:08.56	
