= Owe Fischer-Breiholz =

German athlete (born 2004)

Personal information
- Nationality: German
- Born: 5 May 2004 (age 22)

Sport
- Sport: Athletics
- Event: Hurdling

Achievements and titles
- Personal bests: 400 m: 47.11s (2024); 400 mH: 48.01s (2025)
Medal record
Men's athletics
Representing Germany
European U23 Championships
Gold medal – first place	2025 Bergen	400 m hurdles

Owe Fischer-Breiholz (born 5 May 2004) is a German hurdler. He is a two-time German under-23 champion and European U23 champion in the 400 metres hurdles.

== Biography ==
He was runner-up at the senior German Athletics Championships behind Emil Agyekum in June 2024 in Braunschweig in a time of 49.52 seconds. He won the German under-23 title in the 400 metres hurdles in Monchengladbach the following month.

Having run previously as a member of SC Schwerin, he joined Königsteiner LV from 2025. He lowered his personal best to 48.76 seconds for the 400 metres hurdles in July 2025 at the German U23 Championships in Ulm, where he retained his title. The result almost moved him to first in the European under-23 rankings. He competed for Germany at the 2025 European Athletics U23 Championships in Bergen, Norway, winning the gold medal and breaking Karsten Warholm's championship record from 2017, and defeating defending champion Ismail Nezir.

He competed at the 2025 World Athletics Championships in the men's 400 metres hurdles in Tokyo, Japan in September 2025 but was forced to withdraw prior to his semi-final. In September 2025, he was nominated for the European Athletics male rising star award.

On 2 May 2026, he represented Germany at the 2026 World Athletics Relays in Gaborone, Botswana, running in the men's 4 × 400 metres as the team ran the fastest time recorded by a German team since 1993. In September, he competed in the 400 m hurdles at the inaugural World Ultimate Championship in Budapest.

== Personal life ==
He was educated in Schwerin.
