= Matic Ian Guček =

Slovenian athlete (born 2003)

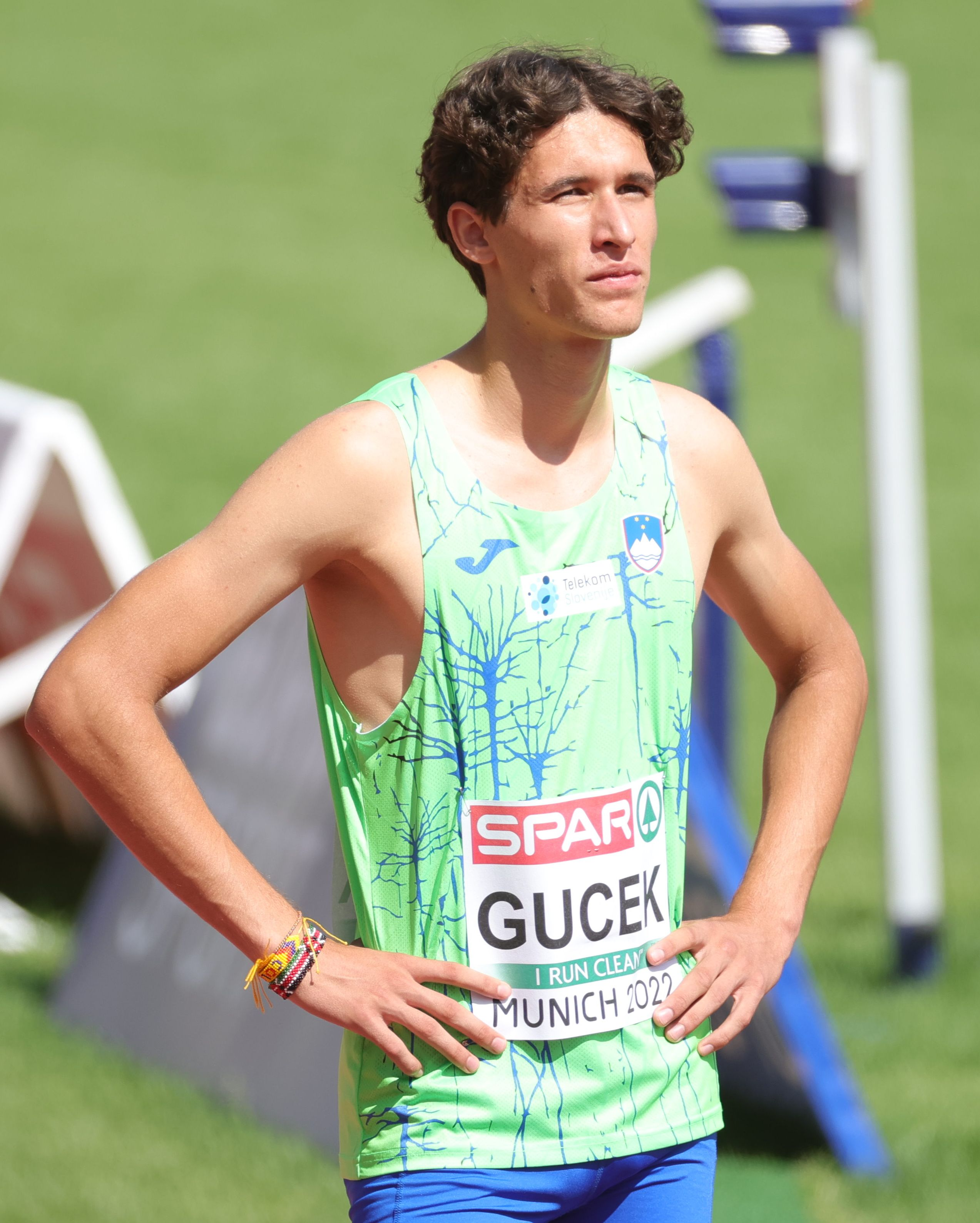
- Guček at the 2022 European Athletics Championships

Personal information
- Nationality: Slovenian
- Born: 20 September 2003 (age 22)

Sport
- Sport: Athletics
- Event: 400m hurdles

Achievements and titles
- Personal bests: 400m: 46.60 (Nova Gorica, 2022); 400m hurdles: 47.80 (Zurich, 2026) NR
Medal record
Men's athletics
Representing Slovenia
European U23 Championships
Bronze medal – third place	2025 Bergen	400m hurdles
World U20 Championships
Silver medal – second place	2022 Cali	400m hurdles

Matic Ian Guček (born 20 September 2003) is a Slovenian hurdler. He is a multiple-time national champion and national record holder over 400 metres hurdles.

== Biography ==
He won his first Slovenian national title in 2021, winning indoors over 60 metres hurdles. In June of that year, he won the Slovenian 400m hurdles title for the first time. He qualified for the final and placed fifth overall in the Men's 400 metres hurdles at the 2021 World Athletics U20 Championships in Nairobi.

He was a silver medalist in the Men's 400 metres hurdles at the 2022 World Athletics U20 Championships in Cali in 2022, running a 48.91. He also set a senior Slovenian national record with the time, beating the previous best which was held by Rok Kopitar and had stood for 42 years. He was subsequently selected for the 2022 European Athletics Championships in Munich.

In 2023, he represented Slovenia in the 400 metres hurdles at the 2023 European Athletics Team Championships in which he finished second in Division II. He raced at the European Athletics U23 Championships in Espoo in which he finished fourth, and the 2023 World Athletics Championships in Budapest.

He lowered his own Slovenian national record over 400 metres hurdles in May 2024 in Kranj, running 48.66, which met the qualifying standard for the 2024 Paris Olympics. He finished sixth in 49.13 at the 2024 Diamond League event in Stockholm.

He ran a personal best 48.34 seconds to reach the final of the 400m hurdles at the 2024 European Athletics Championships in Rome. In his major championship final debut he placed seventh overall, running 48.87 seconds. He competed at the 2024 Summer Olympics in Paris in August 2024, in the 400 metres hurdles.

He finishes third in the 400 metres hurdles in May 2025 at the 2025 Doha Diamond League. He equalled his national record of 48.34 seconds in winning bronze at the 2025 European Athletics U23 Championships in Bergen, Norway, running under Karsten Warholm's championship record from 2017. He finished third in the 400 metres hurdles at the 2025 Athletissima in wet conditions in Lausanne.

Selected for the 2025 World Athletics Championships in Tokyo, Japan, in September 2025, he was a semi-finalist in the men's 400 metres hurdles.

In May 2026, he placed fifth in the 300 m hurdles at the 2026 Shanghai Diamond League. Competing at the Paavo Nurmi Games in Finland on 3 June, Matic Gucek won with 48.47 seconds for the 400 m hurdles. On the 16th June at the Ostrava Golden Spike, he lowered his 400m hurdle national record to 48.16, finishing in third place overall. On 12 August, he ran a national record of 48.03 seconds in the semi-finals of the 2026 European Athletics Championships in Birmingham, England. 0n 27 August, he ran a new Slovenian record 47.80 seconds at the 2026 Weltklasse Zürich. At the 2026 Diamond League Final in Brussels in September, he placed seventh in the 400 metres hurdles. Later that month, he competed in the 400 m hurdles at the inaugural World Ultimate Championship in Budapest.

== Personal life ==
Guček is from Celje in Styria.
