= 2025 European Athletics U23 Championships – Men's 400 metres hurdles =

Men's 400 metres hurdles at the 2025 European Athletics U23 Championships
- Venue: Fana Stadion
- Location: Bergen, Norway
- Dates: 17 July (heats); 18 July (semi-finals); 19 July (final)
- Competitors: 37 from 22 nations
- Winning time: 48.01 CR, PB

Medalists
gold medal	Owe Fischer-Breiholz	Germany
silver medal	İsmail Nezir	Turkey
bronze medal	Matic Ian Guček	Slovenia

The men's 400 metres hurdles event at the 2025 European Athletics U23 Championships was held in Bergen, Norway, at Fana Stadion on 17, 18 and 19 July.

== Records ==
Prior to the competition, the records were as follows:

Record	Athlete (nation)	Time (s)	Location	Date
European U23 record	Karsten Warholm (NOR)	47.64	Berlin, Germany	9 August 2018
Championship U23 record	Karsten Warholm (NOR)	48.37	Bydgoszcz, Poland	16 July 2017

== Results ==
=== Heats ===
First 4 in each heat (Q) and the next 4 fastest (q) qualified for the semi-finals.

==== Heat 1 ====
Place	Athlete	Nation	Time	Notes
1	Jake Minshull	Great Britain	50.03	Q
2	Simon Deschamps	France	50.33	Q
3	Victor Blanco	Spain	50.34	Q
4	Levente Soos	Hungary	50.64	Q
5	Mustafa Çinpolat	Turkey	51.26	q, PB
6	Lasse Schmitt	Germany	51.87	
7	Thierry Cajeux	Switzerland	51.99	

==== Heat 2 ====
Place	Athlete	Nation	Time	Notes
1	Owe Fischer-Breiholz	Germany	50.01	Q
2	Csaba Molnár	Hungary	50.93	Q
3	Harry Barton	Great Britain	50.97	Q
4	Mitja Zubin	Slovenia	51.04	Q
5	Abdulkeri̇m İran	Turkey	51.34	q
6	Eloi Vilella Escolano	Andorra	52.72	
7	Fintan Dewhirst	Ireland	56.24	

==== Heat 3 ====
Place	Athlete	Nation	Time	Notes
1	Mimoun Abdoul Wahab	Belgium	49.57	Q, PB
2	İsmail Nezir	Turkey	50.16	Q
3	David Thid	Sweden	50.19	Q
4	Dario Bressanello	Italy	50.69	Q, PB
5	Maximilian Köhler	Germany	51.03	q
6	Danilo Küchler	Switzerland	51.56	
7	Matan Dan	Israel	52.70	

==== Heat 4 ====
Place	Athlete	Nation	Time	Notes
1	Antti Sainio	Finland	49.87	Q
2	Vittorio Ghedina	Italy	50.10	Q
3	Sebastian Monneret	Denmark	50.58	Q, PB
4	Aymeric Dutrevis	France	50.75	Q
5	Tijm Oosterom	Netherlands	50.87	q, PB
6	Mihajlo Katanić	Serbia	51.47	
7	Petros Papagiannis	Greece	52.05	SB
8	Denis Bartek	Slovakia	52.71	

==== Heat 5 ====
Place	Athlete	Nation	Time	Notes
1	Matic Ian Guček	Slovenia	50.42	Q
2	Diogo Barrigana	Portugal	50.69	Q
3	Jere Haapalainen	Finland	50.94	Q, SB
4	Gergő Takács	Hungary	51.15	Q
5	Davide Capobianco	Italy	51.46	
6	David Friedrich	Luxembourg	52.33	PB
7	Lucas Grimstad Nilsen	Norway	54.30	
8	Tobias Eberhard	Switzerland	57.00	

=== Semi-finals ===
First 2 in each heat (Q) and the next 2 fastest (q) qualified for the semi-finals.

==== Heat 1 ====
Place	Athlete	Nation	Time	Notes
1	Owe Fischer-Breiholz	Germany	49.30	Q
2	Jake Minshull	Great Britain	49.39	Q
3	Diogo Barrigana	Portugal	49.69	
4	Csaba Molnár	Hungary	50.55	
5	Jere Haapalainen	Finland	51.11	
6	Mustafa Çinpolat	Turkey	51.20	PB
7	Tijm Oosterom	Netherlands	51.67	
8	Aymeric Dutrevis	France	52.04	

==== Heat 2 ====
Place	Athlete	Nation	Time	Notes
1	Antti Sainio	Finland	48.97	Q, NR
2	Matic Ian Guček	Slovenia	49.29	Q, SB
3	Simon Deschamps	France	49.42	q, PB
4	David Thid	Sweden	49.60	q, SB
5	Gergő Takács	Hungary	50.38	
6	Harry Barton	Great Britain	50.60	
7	Dario Bressanello	Italy	50.96	
8	Abdulkeri̇m İran	Turkey	51.48	

==== Heat 3 ====
Place	Athlete	Nation	Time	Notes
1	İsmail Nezir	Turkey	49.52	Q
2	Vittorio Ghedina	Italy	49.61	Q, PB
3	Mimoun Abdoul Wahab	Belgium	50.24	
4	Levente Soos	Hungary	50.31	PB
5	Victor Blanco	Spain	50.73	
6	Maximilian Köhler	Germany	50.92	
7	Sebastian Monneret	Denmark	51.04	
8	Mitja Zubin	Slovenia	51.88	

=== Final ===
Place	Athlete	Nation	Time	Notes
1st place, gold medalist(s)	Owe Fischer-Breiholz	Germany	48.01	CR, PB
2nd place, silver medalist(s)	İsmail Nezir	Turkey	48.33	PB
3rd place, bronze medalist(s)	Matic Ian Guček	Slovenia	48.34	=NR
4	Antti Sainio	Finland	48.61	NR
5	Jake Minshull	Great Britain	49.18	
6	Simon Deschamps	France	49.72	
7	Vittorio Ghedina	Italy	49.85	
8	David Thid	Sweden	49.85	
