= Roshawn Clarke =

Jamaican athlete

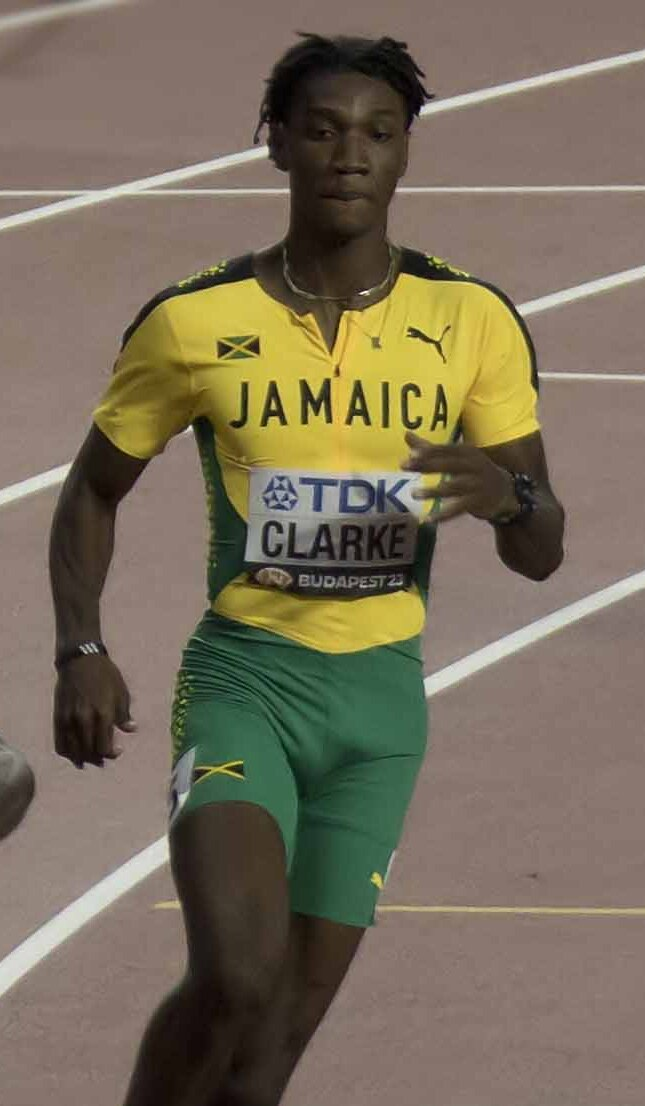
- Roshawn Clarke in 2023

Personal information
- Nationality: Jamaican
- Born: 1 July 2004 (age 22)

Sport
- Sport: Athletics
- Event: 400m hurdles
- Club: Swept
- Coached by: Okeil Stewart

Achievements and titles
- Personal bests: 400m hurdles: 47.34 (Budapest, 2023) WU20R; 400m: 45.24 (Kingston, 2023)
Medal record
Men's athletics
Representing Jamaica
World U20 Championships
Bronze medal – third place	2022 Cali	400m hurdles
NACAC U18 Championships
Gold medal – first place	2021 San José	400m hurdles
Gold medal – first place	2021 San José	Mixed relay
CARIFTA Games Junior (U20)
Gold medal – first place	2022 Kingston	400m hurdles
Gold medal – first place	2023 Nassau	400m hurdles
Gold medal – first place	2022 Kingston	4×400m relay
Gold medal – first place	2023 Nassau	4×400m relay

Roshawn Clarke (born 1 July 2004) is a Jamaican track and field athlete. In 2023 and 2025 he won the Jamaican Athletics Championships over 400m hurdles.

== Early life ==
Clarke attended Camperdown High School, in Kingston, Jamaica. He runs for the Swept Track Club.

== Career ==
2022

In April 2022, Clarke ran a new championship record time of 49.50 for the 400m hurdles, to win the title at the Boys and Girls' Athletics Championships held in Kingston, Jamaica.

In 2022, he was a bronze medalist in the 400m hurdles at the 2022 World Athletics U20 Championships.

== 2023 ==
Clarke won gold at the 2022 CARIFTA Games in the u-20 boys 400m hurdles, and defended that title at the 2023 CARIFTA Games, running 49.92 at the Thomas A. Robinson Stadium in Nassau, Bahamas. He also contributed to the Jamaican team winning the mile relay, and was given the Austin Sealy Award for the most outstanding performer at the Games.

Competing at the Jamaican national championships, Clarke qualified for the 400m hurdles final with the fastest time. In the final, he won the event in 47.85s, a time which tied with Sean Burrell for the world junior record he had set in 2021. He became only the second Jamaican to run under 48 seconds for the event, and the time placed him fourth-fastest in the world for the year.

He lowered his personal best and set a new world under-20 record at the 2023 World Athletics Championships in Budapest, running 47.34 seconds in his semi-final. He finished fourth overall in the final.

== 2024 ==
In April 2024, he was selected as part of the Jamiacan team for the 2024 World Athletics Relays in Nassau, Bahamas. In June 2024, he finished second at the Jamaican Athletics Championships in the 400m hurdles in Kingston.

He competed at the 2024 Summer Olympics in Paris in August 2024, reaching the final of the 400 metres hurdles, but did not finish.

In October 2024, it was announced that he had signed up for the inaugural season of the Michael Johnson founded Grand Slam Track.

== 2025 ==
In the opening race of the first slam held in Kingston, he finished second over 400m hurdles in 48.20 seconds. In the second 2025 Grand Slam Track event in Miami he suffered an injury and could not finish the race. He returned from injury to run 48.66 seconds to win the 400m hurdles on 7 June 2025, at the Racers Grand Prix, a World Athletics Continental Tour Silver meeting, in Kingston, Jamaica. He won the 400 metres hurdles final at the 2025 Jamaican Athletics Championships in 48.02 seconds. Selected for the 2025 World Athletics Championships in Tokyo, Japan, in September 2025, he was a semi-finalist in the men's 400 metres hurdles.

== 2026 ==
At the 2026 Camperdown Classics, he won the 60 metres in 6.62 (-1.4) for first place. He competed at Velocity Fest 18 in kingston in March finishing the 200 metres in 20.41 (+0.2) in 1st. Clarke was named in the Jamaica squad for the 2026 World Athletics Relays in Gaborone, Botswana, but later withdrew from the team. On 21 June, he placed third over 200 metres at the 2026 Jamaican Athletics Championships. In July, he was a semi-finalist in the 200 metres at the 2026 Commonwealth Games in Glasgow, Scotland.

== Statistics ==
Grand Slam Track results
Slam	Race group	Event	Pl.	Time	Prize money
2025 Kingston Slam	Long hurdles	400 m hurdles	2nd	48.20	US$50,000
2025 Kingston Slam	Long hurdles	400 m	4th	45.73	US$50,000
2025 Miami Slam	Long hurdles	400 m hurdles		DNF	
2025 Miami Slam	Long hurdles	400 m		DNS	
