= Matthews Motshwarateu =

South African long-distance runner

Medal record

Men's athletics

Representing South Africa

African Championships
| Silver medal – second place | 1992 Belle Vue Harel | 10,000 m |

Matthews Motshwarateu (1958–2001) was a South African track, cross country, and road runner.

In 1978 Matthews Motshwarateu won the South African 5000m championship, setting a new South African record for the event. He retained his title the following year.

Nicknamed 'Loop en Val' (Afrikaans for 'walk and fall') for his awkward style, he set a world 10 km road record of 27:59.3 in Purchase, New York, in 1980. Running for the University of Texas at El Paso, he won the 1981 NCAA Cross Country Championship, defeating teammates; future Olympic bronze medalist Mike Musyoki and reigning Olympic silver medallist in the 5000 metres the year before, Suleiman Nyambui. He won the silver medal in the 10,000 metres at the 1992 African Championships.

He died in Soweto, outside Johannesburg, in 2001 from wounds sustained in a shooting outside his family home in Molapo, Soweto. The culprits have never been apprehended.

Motshwarateu competed for Botswana during the late 1980s as South Africans couldn't compete internationally. He still holds national records in both Botswana and South Africa.
