= 2022 African Championships in Athletics – Men's triple jump =

The men's triple jump event at the 2022 African Championships in Athletics was held on 11 June in Port Louis, Mauritius.

== Results ==
Rank	Athlete	Nationality	#1	#2	#3	#4	#5	#6	Result	Notes
1st place, gold medalist(s)	Hugues Fabrice Zango	Burkina Faso	17.34w	x	16.46w	16.86w	–	15.37	17.34w	
2nd place, silver medalist(s)	Thalosang Tshireletso	Botswana	16.77w	15.72w	16.53	x	x	16.65 NR	16.77w	
3rd place, bronze medalist(s)	Yasser Triki	Algeria	16.58w	16.33w	x	13.79	15.63w	16.34	16.58w	
4	Alexandre Gentil	Mauritius	16.25w	16.21w	x	15.99w	–	16.10w	16.25w	
5	Lleyton Davids	South Africa	x	15.18w	16.04w	16.20w	x	x	16.20w	
6	Isaac Kirwa	Kenya	15.09w	15.72w	16.04	15.74	16.02w	16.11w	16.11w	
7	Gilbert Pkemoi	Kenya	15.81w	15.73w	15.63w	15.97w	x	15.40	15.97w	
8	Hossam Shoman	Egypt	15.93w	x	15.38	x	15.42	15.49w	15.93w	
9	Derick Chiambah Gama	Cameroon	15.80	14.04w	15.65				15.80	
10	Mohamed Hammadi	Morocco	13.65w	x	15.54				15.54	
11	Guy Lebon Attoungbre	Ivory Coast	14.38w	15.46w	15.34w				15.46w	
12	Roger Haitengi	Namibia	15.29w	15.31w	15.45w				15.45w	
13	Yacouba Loue	Burkina Faso	14.83w	15.08w	15.18w				15.18w	
14	Lazare Simklina	Togo	13.61w	13.79w	14.84w				14.84w	
15	Amath Faye	Senegal	x	x	14.80				14.80	
16	Tshwanelo Aabobe	Botswana	13.73w						13.73w	
17	Emile Conde	Guinea	13.08w						13.08w	
