= 2022 African Championships in Athletics – Men's long jump =

The men's long jump event at the 2022 African Championships in Athletics was held on 9 June in Port Louis, Mauritius.

== Results ==
Rank	Athlete	Nationality	#1	#2	#3	#4	#5	#6	Result	Notes
1st place, gold medalist(s)	Thalosang Tshireletso	Botswana	7.61w	7.82w	7.82w	x	x	x	7.82w	
2nd place, silver medalist(s)	Cheswill Johnson	South Africa	x	x	7.78w	x	x	x	7.78w	
3rd place, bronze medalist(s)	Amath Faye	Senegal	7.39w	x	x	x	7.70w	7.70w	7.70w	
4	Adel Cupidon	Mauritius	x	x	7.32w	7.60w	7.57w	x	7.60w	
5	Yann Randrianasolo	Réunion	7.40w	x	7.22w	x	7.57w	7.37w	7.57w	
6	Thapelo Monaiwa	Botswana	7.38w	7.25w	7.43w	7.55w	6.84w	6.99w	7.55w	
7	Roméo N'Tia	Benin	6.81w	x	7.38w	7.05w	7.44w	x	7.44w	
8	Isaac Kirwa	Kenya	7.27w	7.36w	7.37w	x	x	x	7.37w	
9	Norman Chibane	Botswana	7.29w	7.06w	7.21w				7.29w	
10	Lys Mendy	Senegal	7.04w	7.21w	7.01w				7.21w	
11	Lazare Simklina	Togo	7.19w	x	x				7.19w	
12	Jovan van Vuuren	South Africa	x	x	7.15w				7.15w	
13	Appolinaire Yinra	Cameroon	x	6.62w	7.08w				7.08w	
14	Emile Condé	Guinea	5.92w	x	6.02w				6.02w	
