= Ezekiel Nathaniel =

Nigerian hurdler (born 2003)

Nathaniel Ezekiel
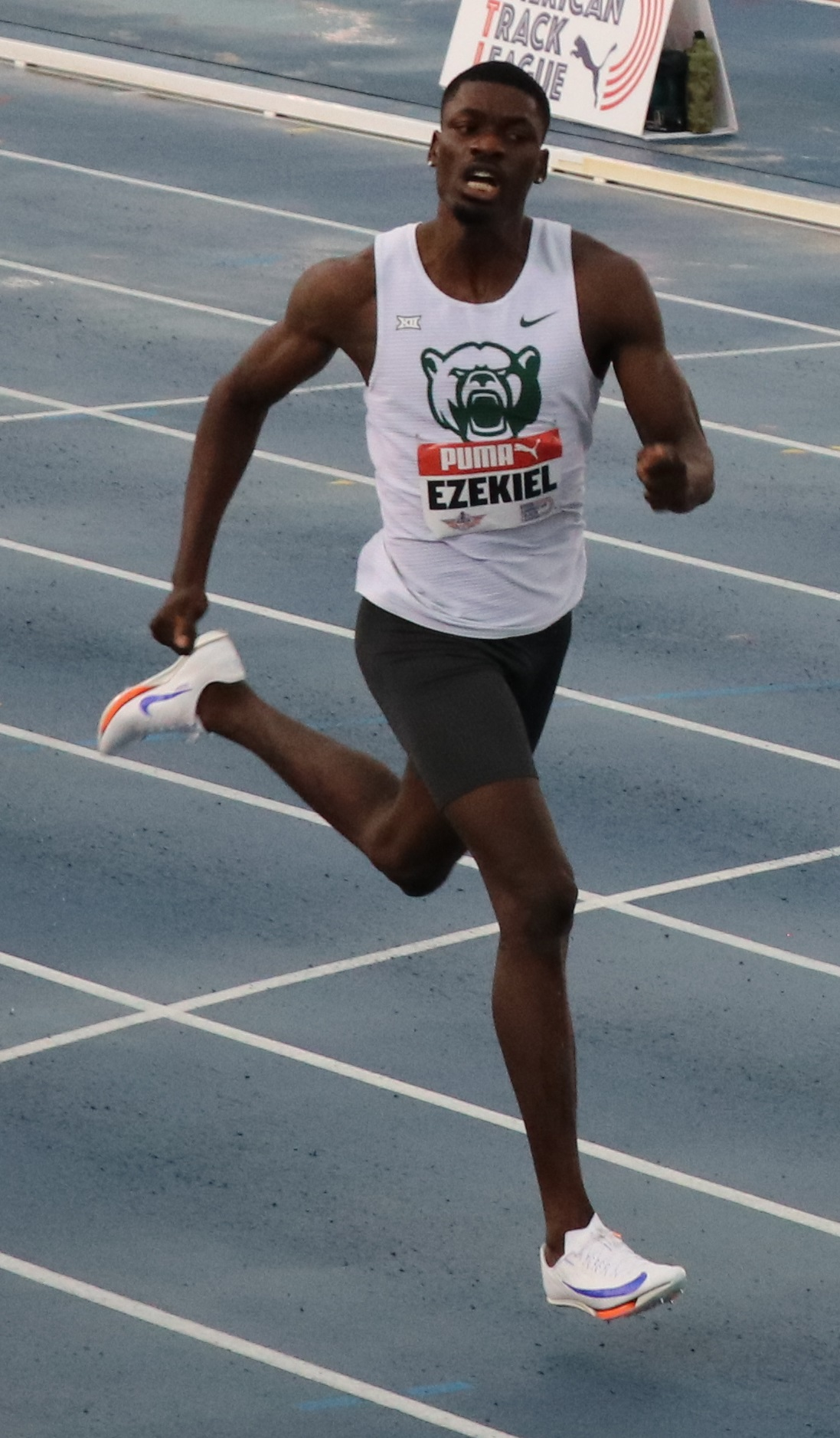

Personal information
- Nationality: Nigerian
- Born: 20 June 2003 (age 23)

Sport
- Sport: Track and Field
- Event: 400 metres hurdles

Achievements and titles
- Personal bests: Outdoor; 400 mH: 47.11 (Tokyo, 2025) NR; Indoor; 400 m: 44.74 (Lubbock, 2025) AR
Medal record
Men's athletics
Representing Nigeria
Commonwealth Games
Gold medal – first place	2026 Glasgow	400m hurdles
Bronze medal – third place	2026 Glasgow	4×400m Mixed

Nathaniel Ezekiel (born 20 June 2003) is a Nigerian sprinter and 400 metres hurdler. In 2025, he set a Nigerian national record for the 400 metres hurdles at the 2025 World Championships, placing fourth overall, and also set the African indoor record over 400 metres. He won the 2026 Commonwealth Games and 2025 NCAA Outdoor Championships over 400 metres hurdles.

== Biography ==
Nathaniel studied at Baylor University in Texas. In May 2022, during his freshman year, he ran the 400 metres hurdles in a personal best time of 48.42, winning the Big 12 Conference title and breaking the Nigerian record set by Henry Amike in 1987. Subsequently at the 2022 World Athletics Championships in Eugene, Oregon, he ran his first-round heat in 49.64, qualifying for the semi finals.

In Budapest, competing at the 2023 World Athletics Championships in August 2023, he reached the semi finals.

He competed at the 2024 Summer Olympics in Paris in August 2024, in the 400 metres hurdles, reaching the semi-finals. He also competed in the men's 4 × 400 m relay at the Games.

He won the men’s 400 metres in an African indoor record of 44.74 to move to eighth on the world indoor all-time list at the Southeastern Conference Indoor Track & Field Championships in Texas on 1 March 2025. He set a meet record of 47.89 seconds to win the 400 metres hurdles at the Big 12 Conference finals in May 2025 to win the title for the second consecutive year. In June 2025, he also won the 2025 NCAA Outdoor Championships 400 metres title in Eugene, Oregon in a time of 47.49 seconds ahead of Ja'Qualon Scott. He was named men's track athlete of the year at the 2025 NCAA Division I Outdoor Track & Field National Awards.

He placed third in the 400 metres hurdles at the 2025 Prefontaine Classic on 5 July behind Alison Dos Santos and Rai Benjamin. The following month, he ran a 47.31 seconds national record to finish runner-up to Karsten Warholm at the 2025 Kamila Skolimowska Memorial, part of the 2025 Diamond League. He won the 400 metres hurdles at the 2025 Athletissima in wet conditions in Lausanne. He placed third in 47.56 for the 400 metres hurdles at the Diamond League Final in Zurich on 28 August.

Selected for the 2025 World Athletics Championships in Tokyo, Japan, in September 2025, he was a finalist in the men's 400 metres hurdles, placing fourth overall in a new national record time of 47.11 seconds. In December he was one of three finalist for the 2025 Bowerman Award, ultimately won by Jordan Anthony.

On 6 June 2026 he ran 47.37 seconds to win the USATF Lone Star Grand Prix in College Station, Texas in a photo finish with Trevor Bassitt. On 31 July, he won the gold medal in the 400 metres hurdles at the 2026 Commonwealth Games in Glasgow, Scotland. Later also winning a bronze medal in the mixed 4 × 400 m relay. 0n 27 August, he placed third in 47.50 seconds at the 2026 Weltklasse Zürich. In September, he was a finalist competing in the 400 m hurdles at the inaugural World Ultimate Championship in Budapest, placing sixth overall.
