= Thalosang Tshireletso =

Botswana athlete

Personal information
- Nationality: Botswana
- Born: 14 May 1991 (age 35)

Sport
- Sport: Track and Field
- Event: Long jump

Achievements and titles
- Personal best(s): Long Jump: 8.04 (2022); Triple Jump: 16.77 (2022)
Medal record
Men's athletics
Representing Botswana
African Championships
Gold medal – first place	2022 Mauritius	Long jump
Silver medal – second place	2022 Mauritius	Triple jump

Thalosang Tshireletso (born 14 May 1991) is a Botswana athlete who predominantly competes in the long jump and triple jump.

He won the gold medal at the 2022 African Championships in Athletics in Port Louis in June 2022.

== International competition record ==
Year	Competition	Venue	Position	Event	Notes
2011	Universiade	Shenzhen, China	35th (h)	Long jump	6.90 m
2011	Universiade	Shenzhen, China	32nd (h)	Triple jump	13.65 m
2013	Universiade	Kazan, Russia	20th (h)	Triple jump	14.27 m
2022	African Championships	Saint Pierre, Mauritius	1st	Long jump	7.82 m (w)
2022	African Championships	Saint Pierre, Mauritius	2nd	Triple jump	16.77 m (w)
