= Oskar Edlund =

Swedish hurdler (born 2002)

Personal information
- Nationality: Sweden
- Born: 16 November 2002 (age 23)
- Home town: Stockholm, Sweden
- Education: Östra Real; Texas Tech University
- Height: 190 cm (6 ft 3 in)
- Weight: 75 kg (165 lb)

Sport
- Sport: Athletics
- Events: 400 metres hurdles 600 metres
- College team: Texas Tech Red Raiders

Achievements and titles
- National finals: 2017 Swedish Indoor U16s; • Long jump, 2nd (silver); • 60 m hurdles, DQ; 2017 Swedish U16s; • 3 × 800 m, 1st (gold); 2017 Swedish U16s; • 300 m hurdles, 1st (gold); • Long jump, 6th; • 80 m hurdles, DNF; 2019 Swedish Indoor U18s; • Long jump, 2nd (silver); • 400 m, 2nd (silver); 2019 Swedish U18s; • Swedish relay, 1st (gold); • 4 × 100 m, 1st (gold); 2019 Swedish U18s; • 200 m, 2nd (silver); • 300 m hurdles, 1st (gold); 2020 Swedish Champs; • 400 m hurdles, 1st (gold); 2020 Swedish U20s; • 400 m hurdles, 1st (gold)
- Personal bests: 400 m hs: 49.57 (2023) 600 m: 1:17.55 sh (2022)
Medal record
Men's athletics
Representing Sweden
European Youth Olympic Festival
Gold medal – first place	2019 Baku	400 m hurdles
Silver medal – second place	2019 Baku	Medley relay
European U20 Championships
Silver medal – second place	2021 Tallinn	400 m hurdles
World U20 Championships
Disqualified	2021 Nairobi	400 m hurdles
European U23 Championships
Bronze medal – third place	2023 Espoo	400 m hurdles
- Updated on 15 January 2024

Oskar Edlund (born 16 November 2002) is a Swedish hurdler specializing in the 400 metres hurdles. He was for a moment the gold medalist at the 2021 World U20 Championships, but he was later disqualified due to a protest.

== Career ==
Though Edlund began competing in athletics in 2015, he did not debut in the 400 metres hurdles until 2019. After winning the Swedish U20 championships in the shorter 300 m hurdles, Edlund qualified to represent Sweden at the 2019 European Youth Olympic Festival. At the festival, Edlund won the gold medal in the 400 m hurdles and a silver in the Swedish medley relay. Edlund finished his 2019 season by winning the Finnkampen U18 race in the 300 m hurdles. His time of 37.09 was a new championship record, despite knocking over a hurdle and leaping over the finish line in a manner described as similar to that of Charles Paddock.

Edlund won his first senior national title at the 2020 Swedish Athletics Championships in the 400 m hurdles. In doing so, he ran 50.15 seconds to beat Carl Bengtström in a "dramatic race", setting the Swedish U20 record by five hundredths of a second. He followed this up by winning the Finnkampen 4 × 400 m.

In 2021, Edlund didn't open his season until 3 July due to injuries. He competed at the European U20 Championships, and by virtue of his silver medal there he was able to represent Sweden at the 2021 World U20 Championships. Edlund advanced past the heats and semi-finals as the number five seed. In the finals, Edlund crossed the finish line first, initially appearing that he had surprisingly won the gold medal in a new Swedish U20 record of 49.20 seconds. However, he was later disqualified due to pulling his trail leg outside his lane while clearing a hurdle due to a protest from the Jamaica Athletics Administrative Association. Sweden appealed the disqualification, claiming that the action did not impede any other runners, but they did not succeed.

In the fall of 2021, Edlund moved to the United States where he competed on the Texas Tech Red Raiders track and field team. As a sophomore, he qualified for the 2023 NCAA Division I Outdoor Track and Field Championships, but did not advance beyond the semi-finals. After a 7th-place finish at the 2023 BAUHAUS-galan, Edlund competed at his first European Athletics U23 Championships. In the 400 m hurdles final, he led the race at the third hurdle, but slowed down at the end. He attempted a new strategy of taking 13 steps to the 7th hurdle, which he had not ever done before. Nonetheless, he won the bronze medal, setting a new official personal best of 49.57 seconds.

== Personal life ==
Edlund is from Stockholm, Sweden, where he attended Östra Real secondary school.

== Statistics ==
=== Personal best progression ===
400 m hurdles (84 cm) progression
#	Mark	Pl.	Competition	Venue	Date	Ref
1	51.49	1st place, gold medalist(s)	SAYO	Sollentuna, Sweden	7 Jun 2019	
2	51.41	1st place, gold medalist(s)	Athletics at the European Youth Summer Olympic Festival	Baku, Azerbaijan	25 Jul 2019	

400 m hurdles progression
#	Mark	Pl.	Competition	Venue	Date	Ref
1	50.90	1st place, gold medalist(s)	Täby Sommartävling	Täby, Sweden	4 Aug 2020	
2	50.15	1st place, gold medalist(s)	Swedish Athletics Championships	Uppsala, Sweden	15 Aug 2020	
3	49.94	3rd place, bronze medalist(s)	Big 12 Outdoor Track & Field Championships	Norman, OK	13 May 2023	
4	49.57	3rd place, bronze medalist(s)	European Athletics U23 Championships	Espoo, Finland	15 Jul 2023	
