= Meeting Iberoamericano de Atletismo =

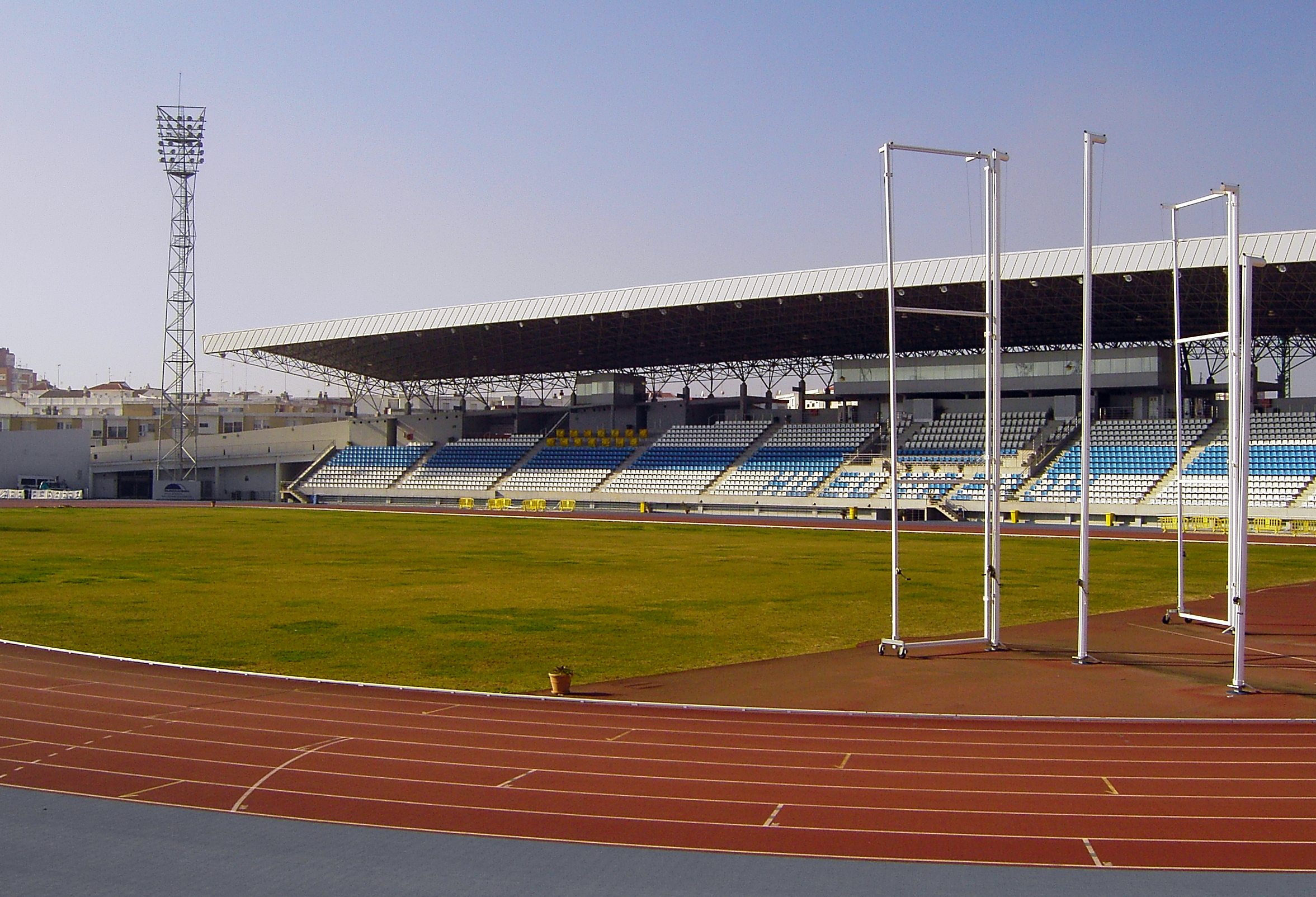
- The host stadium
- Date: June
- Location: Estadio Iberoamericano de Huelva, Huelva, Spain
- Event type: Track and field
- Established: 2005

The Meeting Iberoamericano de Atletismo (transl. Ibero-American Athletics Meeting) is an annual track and field meeting held at the Estadio Iberoamericano in Huelva, Spain since 2005 by the Royal Spanish Athletics Federation. It is typically held in mid-June.

The name of the meeting stems from the 2004 Ibero-American Championships in Athletics which was held at the same location and began the tradition of athletics at the stadium.

== Meeting records ==
=== Men ===
Men's meeting records of the Meeting Iberoamericano de Atletismo
Event	Record	Athlete	Nation	Date	Ref.
100 m	10.19	Francis Obikwelu	Portugal	20 June 2006	
400 m	45.04	Brandon Simpson	United States	20 June 2006	
800 m	1:45.38	Florent Lacasse	France	20 June 2006	
1500 m	3:32.40	Sadik Mikhou	Bahrain	3 June 2016	
3000 m	7:42.16	Juan Carlos de la Ossa	Spain	7 June 2005	
5000 m	12:58.41	Sileshi Sihine	Ethiopia	13 June 2008	
110 m hurdles	13.45	Tyrone Akins	United States	9 June 2010	
400 m hurdles	48.87	Rasmus Mägi	Estonia	3 June 2021	
3000 m steeplechase	8:11.36	Tareq Mubarak Taher	Bahrain	20 June 2006	
High jump	2.35 m	Aleksey Dmitrik	Ukraine	2 June 2011	
Pole vault	5.40 m	Igor Bychkov	Spain	9 June 2010	
Pole vault	5.40 m	Lázaro Borges	Cuba	9 June 2010	
Long jump	8.16 m	James Beckford	Jamaica	20 June 2006	
Triple jump	17.10 m (+1.8 m/s)	Cristian Napoles	Cuba	6 June 2023	
Shot put	21.32 m	Christian Cantwell	United States	7 June 2005	
Discus throw	65.99 m	Mario Pestano	Spain	20 June 2006	
Javelin throw	83.70 m	Guillermo Martínez	Cuba	20 June 2006	
4 × 100 m relay	38.62		Brazil	7 August 2004	

=== Women ===
Women's meeting records of the Meeting Iberoamericano de Atletismo
Event	Record	Athlete	Nation	Date	Ref.
100 m	11.43	Ivet Lalova	Bulgaria	13 September 2007	
200 m	23.34	Yelizaveta Bryzhina	Ukraine	9 June 2010	
400 m	49.78	Salwa Eid Naser	Bahrain	6 June 2023	
800 m	1:58.18	Zulia Calatayud	Cuba	20 June 2006	
1000 m	2:33.06	Mayte Martínez	Spain	13 September 2007	
1500 m	4:03.87	Mary Kuria Wangari	Kenya	7 June 2012	
3000 m	8:35.86	Natalia Rodríguez	Spain	10 June 2009	
5000 m	15:10.13	Alemitu Hawi	Ethiopia	3 June 2016	
100 m hurdles	12.82	Josephine Onyia	Spain	13 June 2008	
400 m hurdles	54.40	Viivi Lehikoinen	Finland	6 June 2023	
3000 m steeplechase	9:11.18	Eunice Jepkorir	Kenya	13 June 2008	
High jump	1.98 m	Ruth Beitia	Spain	13 June 2008	
Pole vault	4.82 m	Holly Bradshaw	Great Britain	3 June 2021	
Long jump	6.85 m (+0.6 m/s)	Tara Davis-Woodhall	United States	6 June 2023	
Triple jump	14.78 m	Yargelis Savigne	Cuba	20 June 2006	
Shot put	19.75 m	Auriol Dongmo	Portugal	3 June 2021	
Discus throw	64.13 m	Darya Pishchalnikova	Russia	13 June 2008	
Hammer throw	72.85 m	Jennifer Dahlgren	Argentina	9 June 2010	
Javelin throw	63.18 m	Osleidys Menéndez	Cuba	20 June 2006	
4 × 100 m relay	38.62	Carmen Mora; Paula García; Paula López-Vieja; Jael Bestúe	Spain	6 June 2023	
