= Botswana Athletics Association =

Sports governing body in Botswana

Botswana Athletics Association (BAA) is an IAAF recognised member officially representing Botswana as the national governing body for the sport of Athletics.

== History ==
Less than six years after the independence of Botswana, the Botswana Athletics Association was formed at a meeting at the Gaborone Secondary School on June 18, 1972. The organization was registered in June 1979, naming Lt. General Mompati Merafhe as its president. After he retired from the military, Merafhe became Botswana's Minister of Foreign Affairs and Vice-President of Botswana from 2008 to 2012. The organization's responsibility covers the same broad umbrella of Athletics events as the world governing body, the IAAF, with the goal of athletes competing on the international stage.

The current president is Phaphane Botlhale. Botswana athletes have found success in long sprinting and middle distance events; Nijel Amos won the first Olympic medal as a junior athlete, finishing with a silver medal in the 800 metres at the 2012 Olympics behind David Rudisha's world record. He was banned for 3 years of doping. Amos remain the World Junior Recordholder from that performance. Amantle Montsho is the 2011 World Champion at 400 meters. Isaac Makwala is the seventh fastest 400 meter runner in history and he leads a promising 4 × 400 metres relay team that was in contention to medal at the 2016 Olympics until the closing steps of the race.
