= Patryk Grzegorzewicz =

Polish sprinter

Patryk Grzegorzewicz (born 26 May 2002 in Raciborz) is a Polish sprinter.

He was selected to participate in the 2020 Tokyo Summer Olympics.

== Stats ==
| Event | Date | Competition | Country | Place | Result |
| 400m | 20 FEB 2021 | Polish Ind. Ch., Toruń | POL | 2. | 47.67 |
| 400m | 14 FEB 2021 | Polish U20 Ind. Ch., Toruń | POL | 1. | 47.92 |
| 400m | 13 FEB 2021 | Polish U20 Ind. Ch., Toruń | POL | 1. | 47.95 |
| 400m | 16 JUL 2021 | European Athletics U20 Championships, Tallinn | EST | 7. | 47.10 |
| 400m | 16 FEB 2020 | Polish U20 Ind. Ch., Toruń | POL | 1. | 48.09 |
| 400m | 03 JUL 2021 | Polish U20 Ch., Lublin | POL | 1. | 47.16 |
| 400m | 15 JUL 2021 | European Athletics U20 Championships, Tallinn | EST | 3. | 47.17 |
| 400m | 07 JUL 2018 | European Athletics U18 Championships, Györ | HUN | 1. | - |
