= Victor Ntweng =

Botswanan athlete

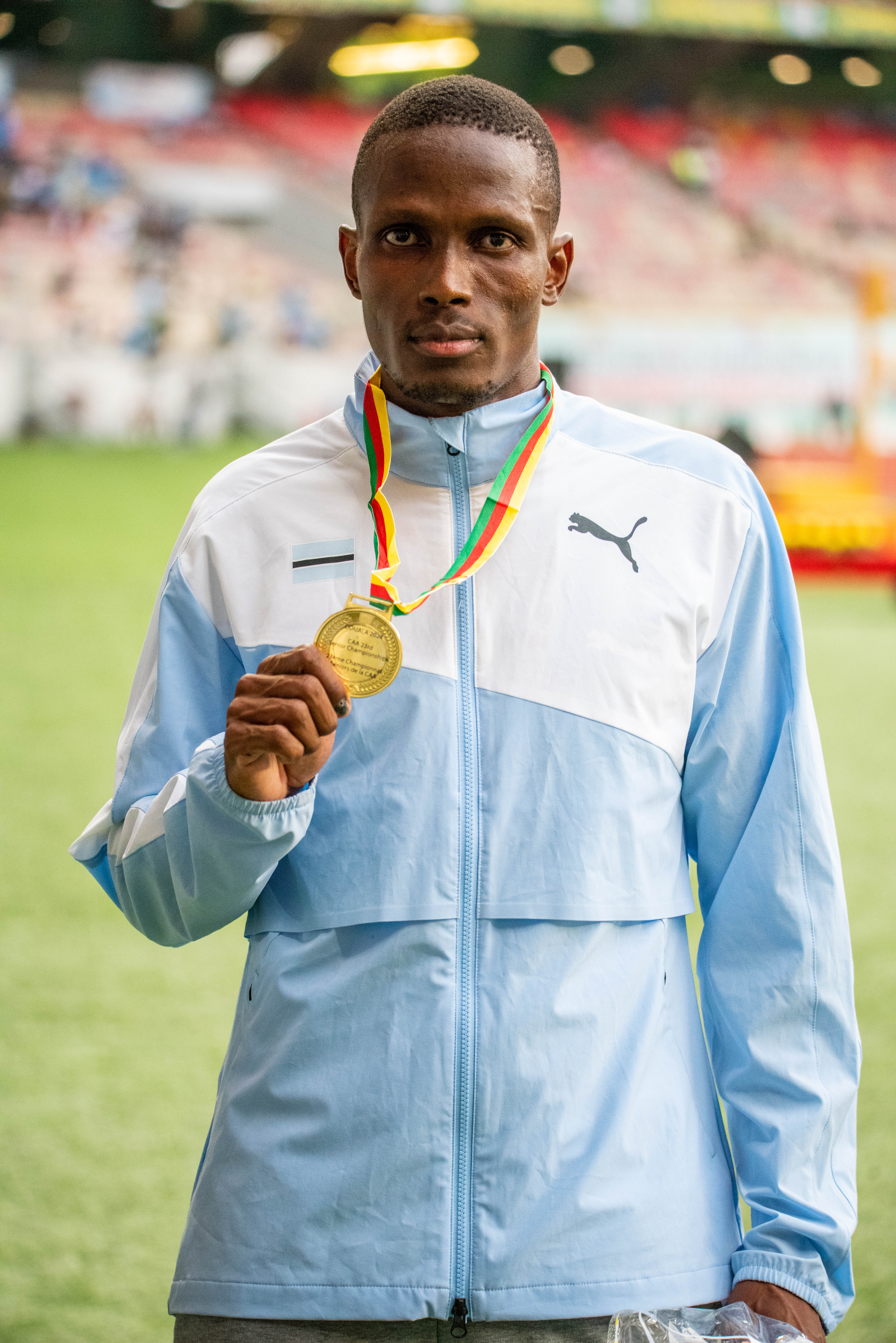
- Ntweng at the 2024 African Championships

Personal information
- Full name: Victor Bonnye Ntweng
- Nationality: Botswana
- Born: 1 December 1995 (age 30)

Sport
- Sport: Athletics
- Event: 400 m hurdles

Achievements and titles
- Personal bests: 400mH: 48.54 (Tokyo, 2025)
Medal record
Men's athletics
Representing Botswana
African Championships
Gold medal – first place	2024 Douala	400 m hurdles
Silver medal – second place	2026 Accra	400 m hurdles
African Games
Silver medal – second place	2023 Accra	400 m hurdles

Victor Bonnye Ntweng (born 1 December 1995) is a track and field athlete. He is a former national record holder over 400 metres hurdles for Botswana.

== Biography ==
A member of Maun BDF athletics club he is coached by Kebonyemodisa Mosimanyane. Ntweng was initially a 400 metres flat runner before transitioning to 400m hurdles. He set a new national record time of 49.80 seconds for the 400m hurdles in 2022. He finished seventh at the 2022 African Championships in Athletics in Saint Pierre, Mauritius in June 2022. He was selected to represent Botswana at the 2022 Commonwealth Games in Birmingham.

In February 2024, he lowered his personal best and national record to 49.14 seconds. He won a silver medal at the 2023 African Games in Accra in 49.38 seconds.

In June 2024, he won gold in the 400 metres hurdles at the African Championships in Douala, Cameroon. He competed at the 2024 Summer Olympics in Paris in August 2024, in the 400 metres hurdles.

He competed at the 2025 World Athletics Relays in China in the Mixed 4 × 400 metres relay in May 2025. Selected for the 2025 World Athletics Championships in Tokyo, Japan, in September 2025, he was a semi-finalist in the men's 400 metres hurdles, running a personal best 48.54 seconds in the preliminary round.

In May 2026, he won the silver medal in the 400 metres hurdles at the 2026 African Championships in Athletics in Accra, Ghana.
