= Berke Akçam =

Turkish hurdler (born 2002)

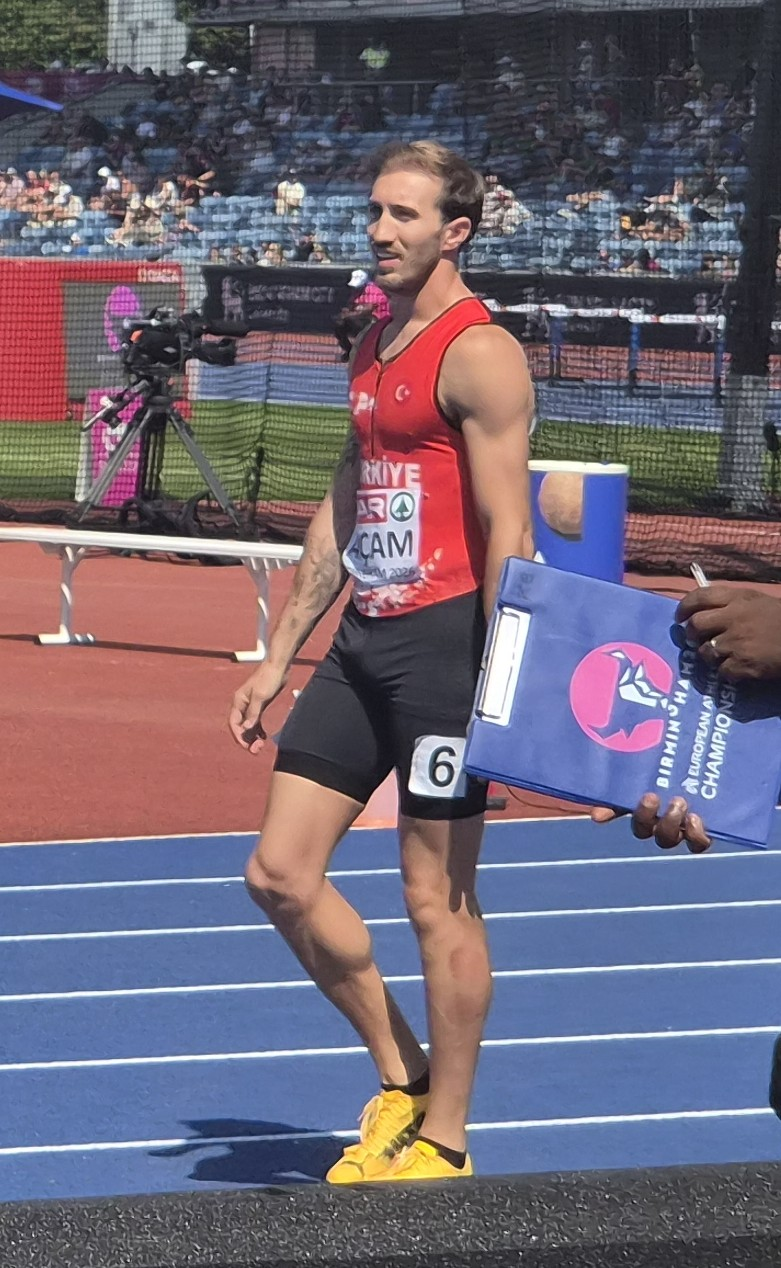
- 2026 European Championships

Personal information
- Nationality: Turkish
- Born: 10 April 2002 (age 24) Bursa, Turkey
- Education: Bursa Uludağ University

Sport
- Country: Turkey
- Sport: Athletics
- Events: 400 metres hurdles, 400 m, 4×400 m relay

Achievements and titles
- Personal bests: 400 m: 46.46 (2021); 400 m (indoor): 46.22 (2024); 400 m hurdles: 48.14 (2024)
Medal record
Men's athletics
Representing Turkey
Summer World University Games
Gold medal – first place	2023 Chengdu	4×400 m relay
Gold medal – first place	2025 Chengdu	400 m hurdles
Bronze medal – third place	2025 Rhine-Ruhr	4 × 400 m relay
European Athletics U23 Championships
Silver medal – second place	2023 Espoo	400 m hurdles
Silver medal – second place	2023 Espoo	4×400 m relay
World U20 Championships
Gold medal – first place	2021 Nairobi	400 m hurdles
European Athletics U20 Championships
Gold medal – first place	2019 Borås	4×400 m relay
Gold medal – first place	2021 Tallinn	400 m hurdles
Islamic Solidarity Games
Gold medal – first place	2025 Riyadh	400 m hurdles
Mediterranean Games
Gold medal – first place	2026 Taranto	4 × 400 m relay
Bronze medal – third place	2026 Taranto	400 m hurdles
Balkan Athletics Championships
Gold medal – first place	2020 Cluj-Napoca	400 m hurdles
Gold medal – first place	2020 Cluj-Napoca	4×400 m relay
Gold medal – first place	2023 İzmir	400 m hurdles
Silver medal – second place	2023 Kraljevo	400 m hurdles

Berke Akçam (born 10 April 2002) is a Turkish track and field athlete who specializes in the 400 metres hurdles and sprint events. He became the **2021 World Athletics U20 champion** in the 400 metres hurdles, winning Turkey's first-ever world title in this event. He is also a double Universiade gold medalist, having won in 2023 (4×400 m relay) and 2025 (400 m hurdles).

== Career ==
Akçam began athletics in his early teens, focusing on sprint and hurdles events. He first represented Turkey at the 2018 European Athletics U18 Championships, where he placed seventh in the 400 m hurdles.

In 2019, he won gold with the Turkish 4 × 400 m relay at the European Athletics U20 Championships in Borås, Sweden. He also took bronze in the 400 m hurdles at the 2019 European Youth Olympic Festival in Baku, Azerbaijan.

In 2020, Akçam won gold in the 400 m hurdles and the 4 × 400 m relay at the Balkan Athletics Championships in Cluj-Napoca, Romania.

In 2021, he became the European U20 champion in the 400 m hurdles in Tallinn, Estonia, and later that year, won the gold medal in the 400 m hurdles at the World Athletics U20 Championships in Nairobi, Kenya, setting a Turkish U20 record of 49.38 seconds.

At senior level, he competed at the 2021 European Indoor Championships and the 2021 World Athletics Relays. In 2023, Akçam set a Turkish national record (3:09.41) in the 4 × 400 m relay at the European Indoor Championships in Istanbul, finishing sixth.

That same year, he won double silver at the European U23 Championships in Espoo, Finland: in the 400 m hurdles (49.48 s) and with the Turkish 4 × 400 m relay team. He also won silver at the 2023 Balkan Athletics Championships in the 400 m hurdles and gold with the Turkish relay.

At the postponed 2021 Summer World University Games in Chengdu (held in August 2023), Akçam placed fourth in the 400 m hurdles and won gold in the men's 4 × 400 m relay.

In 2024, he won the Balkan Indoor Championships in the 400 m and relay, and took silver in the 400 m hurdles at the U23 Mediterranean Championships in Ismailia. At the 2024 European Athletics Championships in Rome, he placed fifth in the 400 m hurdles final with a new personal best of 48.14 seconds.

He represented Turkey at the 2024 Summer Olympics in Paris, reaching the semifinals in the men's 400 metres hurdles.

Akçam has also won multiple Turkish national titles in the 400 m hurdles and the 400 m indoor.

== Achievements ==
- World Athletics U20 Championships
  - Gold: 400 m hurdles, 2021 (Nairobi)
- Summer World University Games
  - Gold: 4 × 400 m relay, 2021 (Chengdu, held 2023)
- European Athletics U23 Championships
  - Silver: 400 m hurdles, 2023 (Espoo)
  - Silver: 4 × 400 m relay, 2023 (Espoo)
- European Athletics U20 Championships
  - Gold: 4 × 400 m relay, 2019 (Borås)
  - Gold: 400 m hurdles, 2021 (Tallinn)
- Balkan Athletics Championships
  - Multiple medals in 400 m hurdles and relays
- National Championships
  - Turkish champion in 400 m hurdles (2020, 2021)
  - Turkish indoor champion in 400 m (2021, 2023, 2024)
