= İsmail Nezir =

Turkish hurdler and sprinter (born 2003)

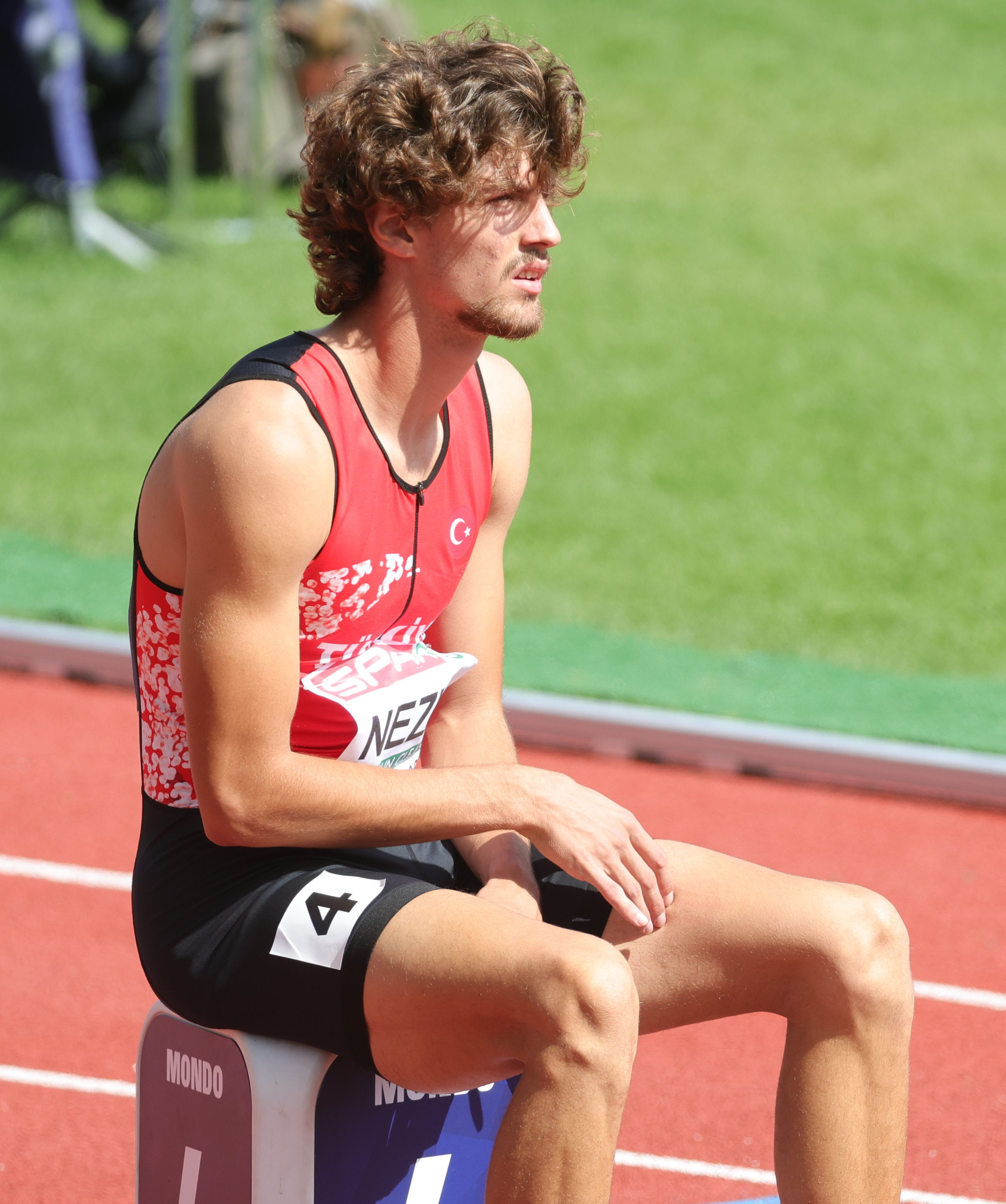
- Nezir at the 2022 European Championships 400 metres hurdles semi-finals

Personal information
- Nationality: TUR
- Born: 22 January 2003 (age 23)
- Home town: Buca, Turkey
- Education: Ege University

Sport
- Sport: Athletics
- Events: 400 metres hurdles 400 metres
- Club: Galatasaray Athletics
- Coached by: Güner Güngör

Achievements and titles
- National finals: 2021 Turkish Indoors; • 300 m, 3rd (bronze); 2021 Turkish U20s; • 400 m hurdles, 2nd (silver); • 200 m, 2nd (silver); 2021 Turkish Champs; • 400 m, 8th; 2022 Turkish Indoors; • 400 m, 1st (gold); 2022 Turkish Champs; • 400 m, 1st (gold); • 400 m hurdles, 1st (gold); 2023 Turkish U23s; • 400 m hurdles, 1st (gold); • 400 m, 1st (gold)
- Personal bests: 400 mH: 48.72 NU23R (2023) 400 m: 45.83 NU20R (2022) 400 m sh: 46.76 NU20R (2022)
Medal record
Men's athletics
Representing Turkey
European Championships
Bronze medal – third place	2026 Birmingham	400 m hurdles
World University Games
Gold medal – first place	2023 Chengdu	4 × 400 m relay
Silver medal – second place	2023 Chengdu	400 m hurdles
Bronze medal – third place	2025 Rhine-Ruhr	4 × 400 m relay
Islamic Solidarity Games
Bronze medal – third place	2025 Riyadh	400 m hurdles
Mediterranean Games
Gold medal – first place	2026 Taranto	4 × 400 m relay
Gold medal – first place	2026 Taranto	4 × 400 m mixed relay
Silver medal – second place	2026 Taranto	400 m hurdles
Bronze medal – third place	2022 Oran	4 × 400 m relay
Balkan Indoor Championships
Gold medal – first place	2021 Istanbul	4 × 400 m relay
Silver medal – second place	2022 Istanbul	400 m
Bronze medal – third place	2022 Istanbul	4 × 400 m relay
European U23 Championships
Gold medal – first place	2023 Espoo	400 m hurdles
Silver medal – second place	2023 Espoo	4 × 400 m relay
Silver medal – second place	2025 Bergen	400 m hurdles
World U20 Championships
Gold medal – first place	2022 Cali	400 m hurdles
- Updated on 15 August 2026

İsmail Nezir (born 22 January 2003) is a Turkish hurdler and sprinter. He was a part of the Turkish record-holding 4 × 400 m relay team, and he won the individual gold medal at the 2022 World U20 Championships in the 400 m hurdles. Lastly, he won bronze medal in the 2026 European Athletics Championships.

== Biography ==
Nezir is from Buca, Turkey. He is part of the Galatasaray Athletics club, where he is trained by Güner Güngör.

Nezir gained his first international experience in 2021, when he won the bronze medal in the 400 metres in 49.05 seconds at the U20 Balkan Indoor Championships in Sofia and won the gold medal with the Turkish 4 × 400 m relay team in 3:18.11. He then won the relay again in 3:13.70 at the 2021 Balkan Athletics Indoor Championships in Istanbul. In July, he competed in the 400 metres hurdles at the 2021 European Athletics U20 Championships and was eliminated in the semi-finals with a time of 51.51 seconds.

The following year, he won in 47.87 seconds at the 2022 Balkan U20 Indoor Athletics Championships in Belgrade over 400 metres and finished fourth in the relay event in 3:24.35. He then won the silver medal in the 400 metres at the 2022 Balkan Athletics Indoor Championships in Istanbul in 46.76 seconds behind his compatriot İlyas Çanakçı and won the bronze medal in the 4 × 400 m with a new national record of 3:10.76, behind the teams from Romania and Slovenia.

In July, Nezir began his outdoor 2022 season with a seventh-place hurdles finish at the 2022 Mediterranean Games in Oran in 50.09 seconds. He won the bronze medal in the relay in 3:04.55, behind Algeria and Italy. Later that month he won the 2022 Balkan U20 Athletics Championships in Denizli in 50.86 seconds, followed by his most significant win yet – a gold medal at the World U20 Championships in 48.84 seconds. The time was also a Turkish under-20 record, and Nezir was congratulated by the mayor of Buca after his return home.

Nezir ended his 2022 season by competing at the Islamic Solidarity Games in Konya, where he was disqualified, and he then did not advance past the semi-finals of the hurdles (49.75 seconds) or the relay (3:06.68) at the 2022 European Athletics Championships.

In 2023, Nezir competed in the 4 × 400 m relay at the 2023 European Athletics Indoor Championships and finished sixth in a new national record of 3:09.41. In June, he won the B final of the First League of the European Team Championships in 48.84 seconds, securing the bronze medal overall behind Alessandro Sibilio and Rasmus Mägi. He then won the 2023 European Athletics U23 Championships with a time of 49.19, and he earned the silver relay medal in 3:03.04 behind only Italy. In August, he won another silver medal at the World University Games in 48.72 seconds behind Peng Ming-yang, also winning the relay in 3:03.46. Nezir secured his first global championships berth at the 2023 World Athletics Championships, where he eliminated from the hurdles in the first round with a time of 49.92 seconds.

In 2022, Nezir became the Turkish champion in the 400 metres as well as over 400 metres hurdles. He was also the 2022 Turkish Indoor Athletics Championships champion.

In 2026, at the 2026 European Athletics Championships, in the 400-metres hurdles, he set his personal season best with a time of 48.16 in the semifinals and advanced to the final. In the final, he finished third with a time of 48.26 and earned the bronze medal.

== Statistics ==
=== Best performances ===
Event	Mark	Place	Competition	Venue	Date	Ref
400 metres hurdles	48.72 NU23R	2nd place, silver medalist(s)	World University Games	Chengdu, China	4 August 2023	
400 metres	45.83 NU20R NU23R	= (gold) (Heat #6)	International Sprint & Relay Cup	Erzurum, Turkey	4 June 2022	
400 metres (short track)	46.76 sh NU20R	(gold) (Round B)	Balkan Indoor Championships	Istanbul, Turkey	5 March 2022	
