= Sean Burrell =

American athlete (born 2002)

Personal information
- Born: February 23, 2002 (age 24) Zachary, Louisiana, United States

Sport
- Country: United States
- Sport: Track and field
- Events: 100m, 200m, 400m hurdles
- College team: LSU Tigers

Achievements and titles
- Personal bests: 200 m: 20.79 (Baton Rouge 2019); 400 m: 45.42 (Austin 2021); 400 mH: 47.85 (Eugene 2021)

Sean Burrell (born February 23, 2002) is an American athlete who has competed in the 200m, 400m and 400m hurdles.

== Career ==
A native of Zachary, Louisiana, Burrell competes at the collegiate level for the LSU Tigers. He ran 47.85 for the 400m hurdles to win the 2021 NCAA Division I Outdoor Track and Field Championships at Hayward Field, Eugene, Oregon which made him the junior world record holder in that event, beating the record which had been set by Danny Harris in 1984. At the time of the race, the fourth fastest time recorded by anyone in the world that year, and was ultimately the seventh fastest time of 2021.

== Personal life ==
His father Keltrin Burrell Sr. and mother Jacqueline Burrell were high school runners. His brother Jon Burrell competed in the throwing of the javelin at Zachary High School and Louisiana Tech University.
