= Kemorena Tisang =

Botswana hurdler (born 1995)

Personal information
- Born: 25 April 1995 (age 31) Botswana

Sport
- Country: Botswana
- Sport: Athletics
- Events: 110 metres hurdles, 400 metres hurdles
- Club: Botswana Athletics Association

Achievements and titles
- Personal bests: 110 m hurdles: 13.90 (Gaborone 2024); 400 m hurdles: 48.42 (Oordegem 2025) NR
Medal record
Men's athletics
Representing Botswana
African Games
| Bronze medal – third place | 2024 Accra | 400 metres hurdles |
African Championships in Athletics
| Gold medal – first place | 2026 Accra | 400 metres hurdles |
| Silver medal – second place | 2024 Douala | 400 metres hurdles |

Kemorena Tisang (born 25 April 1995) is a Motswana track and field athlete specializing in the 110 m hurdles and 400 m hurdles. He is a multiple-time national champion and has earned medals in the 400 m hurdles at major African competitions. He holds the national records in both 110 m and 400 m hurdles.

At the 2023 African Games in Accra, Ghana, Tisang claimed the bronze medal in the men's 400 m hurdles, marking a historic result for Botswana in hurdles events. At the 2024 African Championships in Athletics in Douala, Cameroon, he improved to win the silver medal in the same event. At the Debswana BAA National Championships in Gaborone, Tisang accomplished a hurdles double. He won the 110 m hurdles in 13.90 s and broke the Botswana national record in the 400 m hurdles with a time of 48.76 s. On 9 August 2025, at the IFAM Oordegem meet in Belgium, Tisang clocked a personal best and new Botswana national record of 48.42 s in the 400 m hurdles, earning qualification for the 2025 World Athletics Championships in Tokyo.
