= British Virgin Islands at the World Athletics Championships =

- Flag of British Virgin Islands
- WA code: IVB
- Medals: Gold 0 Silver 1 Bronze 0 Total 1

World Athletics Championships appearances (overview)
- 1983; 1987; 1991; 1993; 1995; 1997; 1999; 2001; 2003; 2005; 2007; 2009; 2011; 2013; 2015; 2017; 2019; 2022; 2023; 2025

The British Virgin Islands have competed in every World Athletics Championships edition. Since then, it has only been on the podium once, by hurdler Kyron McMaster in 2023, who placed second in the men's 400 metres hurdles. Kyron had narrowly missed the podium four years before, finishing 4th in the same event.

== Medalists ==
Medal	Name	Year	Event
Silver	Kyron Mcmaster	2023 Budapest	Men's 400 meters hurdles

=== By event ===
Event	Gold	Silver	Bronze	Total
400 meters hurdles	0	1	0	1
Totals (1 entries)	0	1	0	1

=== By gender ===
Gender	Gold	Silver	Bronze	Total
Men	0	1	0	1
Women	0	0	0	0

== See also ==
- British Virgin Islands at the Olympics
- British Virgin Islands at the Paralympics
