= 2015 World Youth Championships in Athletics – Boys' 400 metres hurdles =

Boys' 400 metres hurdles at the 2015 World Youth Championships in Athletics
- Venue: Estadio Olímpico Pascual Guerrero
- Dates: 15, 16 and 18 July
- Competitors: 48 from 36 nations
- Winning time: 49.11

Medalists
gold medal	Norman Grimes	United States
silver medal	Ryusei Fujii	Japan
bronze medal	Masaki Toyoda	Japan

The boys' 400 metres hurdles at the 2015 World Youth Championships in Athletics was held at the Estadio Olímpico Pascual Guerrero in Cali, Colombia on 15, 16 and 18 July 2015.

== Records ==
Prior to the competition, the following records were as follows.

World Youth Best	L. J. van Zyl (RSA)	48.89	Kingston, Jamaica	19 July 2002
Championship Record	William Wynne (USA)	49.01	Ostrava, Czech Republic	15 July 2007
World Youth Leading	Rivaldo Leacock (BAR)	51.34	Basseterre, Saint Kitts and Nevis	5 April 2015

== Results ==
=== Round 1 ===
First 3 in each heat (Q) and the next 6 fastest (q) advance to the semifinals.

Rank	Heat	Name	Nationality	Time	Note
1	2	Ryusei Fujii	Japan	50.87	Q, WYL
2	5	Norman Grimes	United States	50.95	Q, PB
3	6	Rivaldo Leacock	Barbados	51.35	Q
4	4	Emmanuel Kipyegon Langat	Kenya	51.70	Q, PB
5	4	Hrvoje Čukman	Croatia	52.09	Q
6	2	Morné van As	South Africa	52.16	Q
7	2	Jauavney James	Jamaica	52.38	Q, PB
8	4	Federico Cesati	Italy	52.68	Q, PB
9	3	Mohamed Amine Touati	Tunisia	52.71	Q, PB
10	1	Wilfried Happio	France	52.73	Q, PB
11	4	Maksims Sinčukovs	Latvia	52.83	q, PB
12	5	Masaki Toyoda	Japan	52.87	Q, PB
13	3	Cory Poole	United States	52.98	Q
14	1	Gianni Lombard	South Africa	52.99	Q
15	2	Kim Hyun-bin	South Korea	53.01	q
16	1	Cody Pauli	Canada	53.13	Q, PB
17	3	Aleix Porras	Spain	53.14	Q
18	1	José Bermúdez	Guatemala	53.28	q, PB
19	3	Pablo Andrés Ibáñez	El Salvador	53.35	q
20	6	Vladimir Lysenko	Russia	53.46	Q
21	6	Darshana Kumarabatagalla	Sri Lanka	53.60	Q
22	6	Akram Bekhtaoui	Algeria	53.62	q, PB
23	6	Mattia Di Panfilo	Italy	53.64	q
24	4	Osmar Torres	Mexico	53.65	
25	1	Yolver Cumache	Venezuela	53.66	
26	5	Huang Mingjian	China	53.68	Q
27	2	Yeóryios Kaloyerákis	Greece	53.71	
28	2	Ricardo Ortiz	El Salvador	53.74	PB
29	2	Alisher Pulotov	Tajikistan	53.87	PB
30	5	Nicholas Kiprotich Chirchir	Kenya	54.13	
31	3	Sandi Omeradžič	Slovenia	54.14	
32	5	Fernando Vega	Mexico	54.27	
33	1	Cristóbal Muñoz	Chile	54.29	PB
34	6	Aljani Bridgewater	Saint Kitts and Nevis	54.60	
35	3	Tim Nemeth	Austria	54.63	
36	3	Scott Chalupiak	Canada	54.64	PB
37	5	Santhosh Kumar Tamilarasan	India	54.92	
38	3	Muath Al-Saad	Saudi Arabia	55.04	
39	6	Quek Lee Yong	Malaysia	55.36	PB
40	4	Branson Rolle	Bahamas	55.70	
41	1	Wei Bin Ow Yeong	Singapore	55.99	
42	6	Samo Stankovič	Slovenia	56.19	
43	4	Adam Yakobi	Israel	56.56	
44	5	Juan Durán	Colombia	58.52	
45	4	Mohamed Faleh	Tunisia	59.21	
–	2	Ali Binate	Algeria	DQ	
–	5	Shokhrukh Baratov	Uzbekistan	DQ	
–	1	Leonardo Ledgister	Jamaica	DNS	

=== Semifinal ===
First 2 in each heat (Q) and the next 2 fastest (q) advance to the final.

Rank	Heat	Name	Nationality	Time	Note
1	1	Masaki Toyoda	Japan	50.72	Q, WYL
2	1	Emmanuel Kipyegon Langat	Kenya	51.13	Q, PB
3	1	Rivaldo Leacock	Barbados	51.20	q, PB
4	2	Ryusei Fujii	Japan	51.21	Q
5	3	Norman Grimes	United States	51.41	Q
6	3	Mohamed Amine Touati	Tunisia	51.92	Q, PB
7	2	Jauavney James	Jamaica	51.96	Q, PB
7	3	Morné van As	South Africa	51.96	q
9	2	Hrvoje Čukman	Croatia	52.33	
10	1	Aleix Porras	Spain	52.38	
11	1	José Bermúdez	Guatemala	52.39	PB
12	3	Kim Hyun-bin	South Korea	52.51	PB
13	1	Cody Pauli	Canada	52.52	PB
14	2	Gianni Lombard	South Africa	52.53	
15	1	Pablo Andrés Ibáñez	El Salvador	52.56	PB
16	2	Maksims Sinčukovs	Latvia	52.63	PB
17	3	Vladimir Lysenko	Russia	52.75	PB
18	3	Federico Cesati	Italy	52.87	
19	1	Cory Poole	United States	52.88	
20	2	Wilfried Happio	France	53.42	
21	3	Darshana Kumarabatagalla	Sri Lanka	53.95	
22	3	Akram Bekhtaoui	Algeria	53.96	
23	2	Mattia Di Panfilo	Italy	54.35	
24	2	Huang Mingjian	China	57.79	

=== Final ===
Rank	Name	Nationality	Time	Note
1st place, gold medalist(s)	Norman Grimes	United States	49.11	WYL
2nd place, silver medalist(s)	Ryusei Fujii	Japan	50.33	PB
3rd place, bronze medalist(s)	Masaki Toyoda	Japan	50.53	PB
4	Rivaldo Leacock	Barbados	51.13	PB
5	Emmanuel Kipyegon Langat	Kenya	52.15	
6	Mohamed Amine Touati	Tunisia	52.73	
7	Morné van As	South Africa	1:10.74	
–	Jauavney James	Jamaica	DQ	
