= List of United States Virgin Islands records in athletics =

The following are the national records in track and field in the United States Virgin Islands maintained by the Virgin Islands Track & Field Federation (VITFF).

== Outdoor ==
Key to tables: Awaiting ratification Record not kept by VITFF Not ratified or later rescinded by VITFF

=== Men ===
Event	Record	Athlete	Date	Meet	Place	Ref.
100 m	10.20 (+0.5 m/s)	Greg Barnes	June 17, 1988	TAC T&F Championships	Tampa, United States	
200 m	20.66 (+0.6 m/s)	Calvin Dascent	May 7, 2011	MEAC Championships	Greensboro, United States	
400 m	44.77	Tabarie Henry	May 23, 2009	NJCAA T&F Championships	Hutchinson, United States	
800 m	1:49.15	Seymour Walter	June 9, 2012	American Miler's Club Series, Meet #2	Indianapolis, United States	
1500 m	3:47.75	Billy Bohlke	April 13, 2002		Tempe, United States	
3000 m	8:37.74 (Note: outdoor best; indoor mark ratified as absolute record)	Billy Bohlke	March 23, 2002		Baton Rouge, United States	
5000 m	14:10.83 (Note: outdoor best; indoor mark ratified as absolute record)	Eduardo Garcia	April 28, 2016	Penn Relays	Philadelphia, United States	
5 km (road)	14:48	Eduardo Garcia	August 25, 2018	Edouard Michelin Memorial 5k	Greenville, United States	
10,000 m	29:18.25	Eduardo Garcia	28 May 2021	Portland Track Festival	Portland, United States	
10 km (road)	30:16	Eduardo Garcia	September 15, 2018	Great Cow Harbor 10k	Northport, United States	
15 km (road)	46:05	Eduardo Garcia	March 11, 2017	Gate River Run	Jacksonville, United States	
20 km (road)	1:03:57+	Eduardo Garcia	April 9, 2017	Rotterdam Marathon	Rotterdam, Netherlands	
Half marathon	1:05:37	Eduardo Garcia	November 10, 2018	Markel Richmond Half Marathon	Richmond, United States	
25 km (road)	1:20:09+	Eduardo Garcia	April 9, 2017	Rotterdam Marathon	Rotterdam, Netherlands	
30 km (road)	1:36:49+	Eduardo Garcia	April 9, 2017	Rotterdam Marathon	Rotterdam, Netherlands	
Marathon	2:17:45 (Note: by World Athletics source, 2:17:44 by official result source)	Eduardo Garcia	2 December 2021 (Note: by World Athletics source, 5 December 2021 by official result source)	California International Marathon	Sacramento, United States	
110 m hurdles	13.31 (+1.5 m/s)	Eddie Lovett	August 8, 2015	NACAC Championships	San José, Costa Rica	
400 m hurdles	49.83	Leslie Murray	June 11, 2009	NCAA Division I Championships	Fayetteville, United States	
3000 m steeplechase	9:25.30	Juan Robles	24 April 2009		Ponce, Puerto Rico	
High jump	2.03 m	Patrick Moore	June 24, 1984		San Juan, Puerto Rico	
Pole vault	5.20 m (Note: outdoor best; indoor mark ratified as absolute record)	Brion Morrisette	August 6, 1984	Olympic Games	Los Angeles, United States	
Long jump	8.11 m (+0.4 m/s)	Leon Hunt	18 June 2011		Tallahassee, United States	
Triple jump	16.99 m (+0.4 m/s)	Muhammad Halim	April 23, 2016	MSU Legacy Meet	Baltimore, United States	
Shot put	12.49 m	Darren Giddings	April 22, 2004		Arkansas City, United States	
Discus throw	33.18 m	Leroy Merchant	April 3, 1983	CARIFTA Games	Fort-de-France, Martinique	
Hammer throw						
Javelin throw	62.05 m	Avery Joseph	10 May 2018	Mid-American Conference Championships	Buffalo, United States	
Decathlon	5416 pts h	Nathan Taylor	July 10–11, 1981	Central American and Caribbean Championships	Santo Domingo, Dominican Republic	
Decathlon	100m / Long jump / Shot put / High jump / 400m / 110m H / Discus / Pole vault / Javelin / 1500m; 12.1 / 6.05 m / 9.67 m / 1.75 m / 55.8 / 16.7 / 29.78 m / 3.40 m / 50.72 m / 5:15.7					
20 km walk (road)	1:43:58	Henry Klein	September 18, 1976		Malmö, Sweden	
50 km walk (road)	5:09:04	Henry Klein	September 18, 1976		Malmö, Sweden	
4 × 100 m relay	39.89	United States Virgin Islands; Adrian Durant; Tabarie Henry; David Walters; Calvin Dascent	July 4, 2009	Central American and Caribbean Championships	Havana, Cuba	
4 × 200 m relay	1:25.01	United States Virgin Islands; Tabarie Henry; Leslie Murray; David Walters; Leon Hunt	24 May 2014	IAAF World Relays	Nassau, Bahamas	
4 × 400 m relay	3:07.05	United States Virgin Islands; Calvin Dascent; Tabarie Henry; Leslie Murray; Terry Charles	July 5, 2009	Central American and Caribbean Championships	Havana, Cuba	

=== Women ===
Event	Record	Athlete	Date	Meet	Place	Ref.
100 m	11.07 (+1.3 m/s)	LaVerne Jones-Ferrette	August 3, 2012	Olympic Games	London, United Kingdom	
200 m	22.46 (+0.3 m/s)	LaVerne Jones-Ferrette	June 1, 2009	Fanny Blankers-Koen Games	Hengelo, Netherlands	
400 m	51.47	LaVerne Jones-Ferrette	April 21, 2007	Kansas Relays	Lawrence, United States	
800 m	2:08.43	Ninfa Barnard	May 11, 2013	Georgia Tech Invitational	Atlanta, United States	
1500 m	4:35.43	Rachel Conhoff	8 May 2022		Collegeville, United States	
3000 m	10:11.44 (Note: outdoor best; indoor mark ratified as absolute record)	Jackie Morgan	April 10, 1999		San Diego, United States	
5000 m	17:31.37	Jackie Morgan	July 10, 1999		Tampa, United States	
10,000 m	36:27.71	Jackie Morgan	April 16, 1999	Mt. SAC Relays	Walnut, United States	
Marathon	2:43:59	Lisha Hamilton	June 6, 2004		San Diego, United States	
100 m hurdles	13.33 (+0.5 m/s)	Flora Hyacinth	May 17, 1987		Tuscaloosa, United States	
400 m hurdles	57.55	Flora Hyacinth	June 30, 1986		Santiago, Dominican Republic	
3000 m steeplechase	11:21.78	Rachel Conhoff	7 May 2022		Collegeville, United States	
High jump	1.81 m	Yashira Rhymer-Stuart	6 April 2019		Bowling Green, United States	
Pole vault	2.74 m	Zhondra Carty	2 April 2011		Cedar Hill, United States	
Long jump	6.72 m (+0.1 m/s)	Flora Hyacinth	May 23, 1998		Mexico City, Mexico	
Triple jump	13.73 m NWI	Flora Hyacinth	May 17, 1987		Tuscaloosa, United States	
Shot put	17.33 m	Maia Campbell	16 May 2021		Murfreesboro, United States	
Discus throw	47.54 m	Maia Campbell	17 April 2021		San Antonio, United States	
Hammer throw	54.69 m	Maia Campbell	10 April 2021		College Station, United States	
Javelin throw	29.00 m	Shanice Cazaubon	May 22, 2015	United States Virgin Islands Championships	Saint Croix, United States Virgin Islands	
Heptathlon	4950 pts	Wanetta Kirby	16–17 July 2011	Central American and Caribbean Championships	Mayagüez, Puerto Rico	
Heptathlon	100m H / High jump / Shot put / 200m / Long jump / Javelin / 800m; 13.76 (+2.3 m/s) / 1.71 m / 9.49 m / 24.58 (−1.3 m/s) / 5.89 m (+1.6 m/s) / 21.22 m / 2:44.72					
20 km walk (road)						
50 km walk (road)						
4 × 100 m relay	45.84	United States Virgin Islands	July 15, 1996		Nassau, The Bahamas	
4 × 400 m relay	3:50.15	United States Virgin Islands	April 24, 2000	CARIFTA Games	St. George's, Grenada	

=== Mixed ===
Event	Record	Athlete	Date	Meet	Place	Ref.
4 × 400 m relay	3:42.22	Malique Smith; Faith Eatmon; Omar Simpson; Michelle Smith	29 June 2024	Tabarie Henry Virgin Islands Championships	Saint Thomas, Virgin Islands	

== Indoor ==
=== Men ===
Event	Record	Athlete	Date	Meet	Place	Ref.
60 m	6.66 A	David Walters	2 February 2013		Albuquerque, United States	
200 m	21.13	Tabarie Henry	January 16, 2010	Texas A&M Invitational	College Station, United States	
200 m	21.09 OT	Tabarie Henry	March 6, 2009	NJCAA Championships	Lubbock, United States	
400 m	45.81	Tabarie Henry	January 30, 2010	Texas A&M Challenge	College Station, United States	
500 m	1:01.28	Tabarie Henry	February 4, 2011	New Balance Collegiate Invitational	New York City, United States	
600 m	1:18.73	Tabarie Henry	March 9, 2008		Charleston, United States	
600 m	1:18.39 OT	Tabarie Henry	March 6, 2009	NJCAA Championships	Lubbock, United States	
800 m	1:51.03	Alexshandro Rodriguez	March 6, 2016		Boston, United States	
1500 m						
3000 m	8:16.15	Eduardo Garcia	January 30, 2016	Razorback Invitational	Fayetteville, United States	
5000 m	14:10.83	Eduardo García	February 27, 2016	SEC Championships	Fayetteville, United States	
5000 m	14:06.17 OT	Eduardo García	February 12, 2016	Iowa State Classic	Ames, United States	
60 m hurdles	7.57 A	Eddie Lovett	March 14, 2014	NCAA Division I Championships	Albuquerque, United States	
60 m hurdles	7.57	Eddie Lovett	February 11, 2017	Millrose Games	New York City, United States	
High jump						
Pole vault	5.22 m	Brian Morrisette	February 4, 1984		Bloomington, United States	
Long jump	7.94 m	Vaughn Walwyn	March 8, 2002	NCAA Division I Championships	Fayetteville, United States	
Triple jump	16.87 m	Muhammad Halim	December 3, 2011	Cornell Relays	Ithaca, United States	
Shot put						
Heptathlon						
Heptathlon	60m / Long jump / Shot put / High jump / 60m H / Pole vault / 1000m					
5000 m walk						
4 × 400 m relay						

=== Women ===
Event	Record	Athlete	Date	Meet	Place	Ref.
50 m	6.14+	LaVerne Jones-Ferrette	February 14, 2012	Meeting Pas de Calais	Liévin, France	
55 m	6.96	Courtney Cerene Patterson	January 14, 2012	Jimmy Carnes College Invitational	Gainesville, United States	
60 m	6.97	LaVerne Jones-Ferrette	February 6, 2010	Sparkassen Cup	Stuttgart, Germany	
200 m	22.95	Allison Peter	March 9, 2012	NCAA Division I Championships	Nampa, United States	
400 m	51.60	LaVerne Jones	February 3, 2007	Sparkassen Cup	Stuttgart, Germany	
800 m	2:12.64	Ninfa Barnard	February 23, 2014	SWAC Championships	Birmingham, United States	
1500 m	4:59.46 y	Ninfa Barnard	February 8, 2014	Samford Multi and Invitational Indoor	Birmingham, United States	
Mile run	4:59.46	Ninfa Barnard	February 8, 2014	Samford Multi and Invitational Indoor	Birmingham, United States	
3000 m	10:00.34	Ninfa Barnard	February 22, 2014	SWAC Championships	Birmingham, United States	
60 m hurdles	8.38	Flora Hyacinth	February 7, 1987		Baton Rouge, United States	
High jump	1.80 m	Yashira Rhymer-Stuart	18 January 2019		Indianapolis, United States	
Pole vault						
Long jump	6.38 m	Flora Hyacinth	March 8, 1997	World Championships	Paris, France	
Triple jump	13.52 m	Flora Hyacinth	March 13, 1993	World Championships	Toronto, Canada	
Shot put	8.83 m (Note: record set during pentathlon competition)	Wanetta Kirby	January 30, 2009		Newport News, United States	
Pentathlon	3288 pts	Wanetta Kirby	January 30, 2016	Patriot Games	Fairfax, United States	
Pentathlon	60m H / High jump / Shot put / Long jump / 800m; 8.91 / 1.66 m / 8.59 m / 5.48 m / 2:54.24					
3000 m walk						
4 × 400 m relay						
