= Fernando Vega =

Fernando Vega may refer to:

- Fernando Vega (athlete) (born 1998), Mexican hurdler
- Fernando Vega (footballer, born 1984), Spanish defender
- Fernando Vega (footballer, born 1995), Argentine midfielder
- Fernando Vega (painter) (1932–1965), Peruvian painter; married to Janine Pommy Vega
