= Athletics at the 2020 Summer Olympics – Men's 400 metres hurdles =

Men's 400 metres hurdles at the Games of the XXXII Olympiad
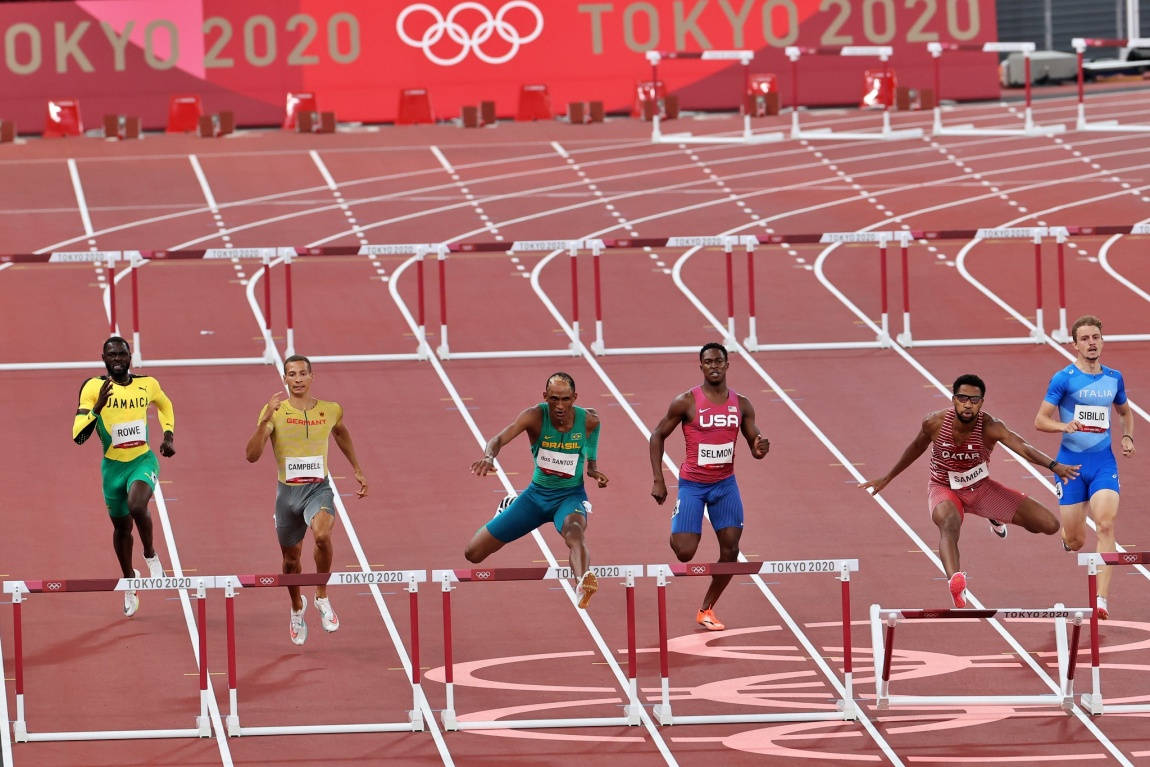
- Semifinal 2
- Venue: Olympic Stadium
- Dates: 30 July 2021 (quarterfinals); 1 August 2021 (semifinals); 3 August 2021 (final)
- Competitors: 36 from 26 nations
- Winning time: 45.94 WR

Medalists
1st place, gold medalist(s)		Karsten Warholm	Norway
2nd place, silver medalist(s)		Rai Benjamin	United States
3rd place, bronze medalist(s)		Alison dos Santos	Brazil

Official Video Highlights

The men's 400 metres hurdles event at the 2020 Summer Olympics took place between 30 July and 3 August 2021 at the Olympic Stadium. 36 athletes from 26 nations competed.

In what has been described as one of the greatest races in Olympic history, Karsten Warholm of Norway won the gold medal, setting a new world record of 45.94 seconds. He beat his own previous record, set a month before, by 0.76 seconds; silver medalist Rai Benjamin of the United States beat the previous record by 0.53 seconds. Brazilian hurdler Alison dos Santos took bronze and would have bettered the almost 30-year-old Olympic record in the final by 0.06 seconds. The medals were the first ever in the event for both Norway and Brazil; the United States' podium streak in the event stretched to four Games.

== Summary ==
Following more than a decade of dominance by Edwin Moses, Kevin Young set the world record at 46.78 in the 1992 Olympic Final, being the first man to break 47 seconds (Moses' best time had been 47.02).

The 47-second barrier would not be broken again until 2018, by Abderrahman Samba, then in 2019, Karsten Warholm and Rai Benjamin broke it in the same race.

In 2021, at the United States Olympic Trials, Benjamin narrowly missed Young's world record, and a week later, Warholm broke it, stopping the clock at 46.70. It was expected it would take a world record to win the Olympic gold medal.

Both Benjamin and Warholm drew each other in the first semifinal: Warholm sped up at the finish to take the win in 47.30, while Alison dos Santos ran 47.31 to win the second semifinal over Samba.

In the final, Warholm started quickly, gaining a slight advantage over the first barrier. One lane to his inside, Benjamin was able to see the position of his opponent. By the fifth hurdle, Warholm had a half a stride advantage, but through the final turn, Benjamin pulled that back in steadily.

Benjamin, with the momentum, cleared the final hurdle even with Warholm, but Warholm opened up in the 40 metre dash to the finish line, winning by two metres.

Warholm's time was 45.94 – breaking the 46-second barrier – and also demolishing his existing world record by 0.76 seconds. Benjamin ran 46.17, more than half a second faster than the previous world record, to win silver, and bronze medalist dos Santos ran 46.72, just 0.02 slower than Warholm's previous world record. If not for Warholm's performance, Benjamin's time would have been the greatest improvement in this event's world record since 1968. Warholm's new record improved his previous record by 1.6%, the largest improvement by percentage in a men's track world record since Michael Johnson lowered the 200m world record by 1.7% in 1996. Also, using World Athletics scoring tables in an attempt to compare the quality of Warholm's performance to other men's track world records, the only world-record performances superior to that of Warholm were Usain Bolt's records in the 100m and 200m.

The all-time list saw Young move down to No. 4 as all three broke his Olympic record; further to this, all three medalists broke their respective continental records, six of the eight competitors in the race set new national records, and all eight finalists recorded the best times in history for their respective placements in the race.

This race was one of the few times in which all three medalists broke the existing Olympic record and the top two finishers also broke the existing world record; and the same outcome occurred in the women's 400m hurdles final the next day.

== Background ==
This was the 27th appearance of the event, which was introduced in 1900. It was left off the 1912 program, but has been contested at every Games since the post-World War I return of the Olympics in 1920.

The reigning world champion was Karsten Warholm of Norway. The reigning Olympic champion Kerron Clement of the United States did not compete.

The British Virgin Islands competed in the men's 400 metres hurdles for the first time. The United States made its 26th appearance, most of any nation, having missed only the boycotted 1980 Games.

== Qualification ==
Approximately forty athletes were expected to compete; the exact number depended on how many nations used universality places to enter athletes in addition to the 40 qualifying through time or ranking (1 universality place was used in 2016).

A National Olympic Committee (NOC) could enter up to 3 qualified athletes in the men's 400 metres hurdles event if all athletes met the entry standard or qualified by ranking during the qualifying period. (The limit of 3 had been in place since the 1930 Olympic Congress.) The qualifying standard was 48.90 seconds. This standard was "set for the sole purpose of qualifying athletes with exceptional performances unable to qualify through the IAAF World Rankings pathway." The world rankings, based on the average of the best five results for the athlete over the qualifying period and weighted by the importance of the meet, was used thereafter to qualify athletes until the cap of 40 is reached.

The qualifying period was originally from 1 May 2019 to 29 June 2020. Due to the COVID-19 pandemic, the period was suspended from 6 April 2020 to 30 November 2020, with the end date extended to 29 June 2021. The world rankings period start date was also changed from 1 May 2019 to 30 June 2020. Athletes who had met the qualifying standard during that time were still qualified, but those using world rankings would not be able to count performances during that time. The qualifying time standards could be obtained in various meets during the given period that have the approval of the IAAF. Only outdoor meets were eligible. The most recent Area Championships could be counted in the ranking, even if they didn't take place during the qualifying period.

NOCs could also use their universality place—each NOC could enter one male athlete regardless of time if they had no male athletes meeting the entry standard for an athletics event—in the 400 metres hurdles.

Entry number: 40.

Qualification standard	No. of athletes	NOC	Nominated athletes
Entry standard – 48.90	3	Jamaica	Jaheel Hyde; Kemar Mowatt; Shawn Rowe
Entry standard – 48.90	3	Japan	Takatoshi Abe; Kazuki Kurokawa; Hiromu Yamauchi
Entry standard – 48.90	3	United States	Rai Benjamin; David Kendziera; Kenny Selmon
Entry standard – 48.90	2	Brazil	Alison dos Santos; Márcio Teles
Entry standard – 48.90	1	Algeria	Abdelmalik Lahoulou
Entry standard – 48.90	1	British Virgin Islands	Kyron McMaster
Entry standard – 48.90	1	Estonia	Rasmus Mägi
Entry standard – 48.90	1	France	Ludvy Vaillant
Entry standard – 48.90	1	Germany	Constantin Preis
Entry standard – 48.90	1	Ireland	Thomas Barr
Entry standard – 48.90	1	Kenya	Moitalel Naadokila
Entry standard – 48.90	1	Norway	Karsten Warholm
Entry standard – 48.90	1	Poland	~~Patryk Dobek~~
Entry standard – 48.90	1	Qatar	Abderrahman Samba
Entry standard – 48.90	1	South Africa	Sokwakhana Zazini
Entry standard – 48.90	1	Switzerland	Kariem Hussein
Entry standard – 48.90	1	Turkey	Yasmani Copello
World ranking	2	Germany	Joshua Abuaku; Luke Campbell
World ranking	1	Chinese Taipei	Chen Chieh
World ranking	1	Costa Rica	Gerald Drummond
World ranking	1	Czech Republic	Vít Müller
World ranking	1	France	Wilfried Happio
World ranking	1	Great Britain	Chris McAlister
World ranking	1	Hungary	Máté Koroknai
World ranking	1	India	M. P. Jabir
World ranking	1	Iran	Mahdi Pirjahan
World ranking	1	Italy	Alessandro Sibilio
World ranking	2	Netherlands	Ramsey Angela; Nick Smidt
World ranking	1	Spain	Sergio Fernández
World ranking	1	Tunisia	Mohamed Touati
Universality Places	1	Cape Verde	Jordin Andrade
Universality Places	1	Mozambique	Creve Armando Machava
Universality Places	1	Seychelles	Ned Justeen Azemia
Total	40		

== Competition format ==
The event continued to use the three-round format used previously in every Games since 1908 (except for a four-round competition in 1952).

== Records ==
Prior to this competition, the existing global and area records were as follows:

World record	Karsten Warholm (NOR)	46.70	Oslo, Norway	1 July 2021
Olympic record	Kevin Young (USA)	46.78	Barcelona, Spain	6 August 1992
World Leading	Karsten Warholm (NOR)	46.70	Oslo, Norway	1 July 2021

Area	Athlete	Time	Nation
Africa (records)	Samuel Matete	47.10	Zambia
Asia (records)	Abderrahman Samba	46.98	Qatar
Europe (records)	Karsten Warholm	46.70 WR	Norway
North, Central America and Caribbean (records)	Kevin Young	46.78	United States
Oceania (records)	Rohan Robinson	48.28	Australia
South America (records)	Alison dos Santos	47.34	Brazil

=== New records ===
The following new World and Olympic records were set during this competition:

World record	Karsten Warholm (NOR)	45.94	Tokyo, Japan	3 August 2021
Olympic record	Karsten Warholm (NOR)	45.94	Tokyo, Japan	3 August 2021

The following new Area (continental) records were set during this competition:

Area	Athlete	Time	Nation
Europe (records)	Karsten Warholm	45.94 WR	Norway
North, Central America and Caribbean (records)	Rai Benjamin	46.17	United States
South America (records)	Alison dos Santos	46.72	Brazil

The following national records were set during this competition:

Country	Athlete	Round	Time	Notes
Brazil	Alison dos Santos	Semifinals	47.31	AR
Brazil	Alison dos Santos	Final	46.72	AR
Estonia	Rasmus Mägi	Semifinals	48.36	
Estonia	Rasmus Mägi	Final	48.11	
Norway	Karsten Warholm	Final	45.94	WR, OR, AR
United States	Rai Benjamin	Final	46.17	AR
British Virgin Islands	Kyron McMaster	Final	47.08	
Turkey	Yasmani Copello	Final	47.81	

== Schedule ==
All times are Japan Standard Time (UTC+9)

The men's 400 metres hurdles took place over three separate days.

Date	Time	Round
Friday, 30 July 2021	9:00	Quarterfinals
Sunday, 1 August 2021	21:05	Semifinals
Tuesday, 3 August 2021	9:00	Final

== Results ==
=== Round 1 ===
Qualification rule: first 4 of each heat (Q) plus the 4 fastest times (q) qualified.

==== Heat 1 ====
Rank	Lane	Athlete	Nation	Reaction	Time	Notes
1	2	Abderrahman Samba	Qatar	0.200	48.38	Q
2	6	Alison dos Santos	Brazil	0.152	48.42	Q
3	8	Abdelmalik Lahoulou	Algeria	0.149	48.83	Q, SB
4	4	Kemar Mowatt	Jamaica	0.139	49.06	Q
5	5	Ludvy Vaillant	France	0.152	49.23	q
6	7	Máté Koroknai	Hungary	0.151	49.80	
7	3	Chen Chieh	Chinese Taipei	0.158	50.96	=SB

==== Heat 2 ====
Rank	Lane	Athlete	Nation	Reaction	Time	Notes
1	4	Jaheel Hyde	Jamaica	0.184	48.54	Q
2	7	Kenneth Selmon	United States	0.185	48.61	Q
3	8	Hiromu Yamauchi	Japan	0.184	49.21	Q
4	9	Constantin Preis	Germany	0.215	49.73	Q
5	6	Creve Armando Machava	Mozambique	0.159	50.37	SB
6	2	Mohamed Amine Touati	Tunisia	0.152	50.58	
7	5	Sergio Fernández	Spain	0.152	51.51	
8	3	Ned Azemia	Seychelles	0.151	51.67	

==== Heat 3 ====
Rank	Lane	Athlete	Nation	Reaction	Time	Notes
1	8	Karsten Warholm	Norway	0.157	48.65	Q
2	7	Thomas Barr	Ireland	0.147	49.02	Q
3	3	Alessandro Sibilio	Italy	0.126	49.11	Q
4	4	Luke Campbell	Germany	0.145	49.19	Q, SB
5	5	Wilfried Happio	France	0.152	49.39	q
6	6	Márcio Teles	Brazil	0.154	49.70	SB
7	2	Gerald Drummond	Costa Rica	0.183	49.92	

==== Heat 4 ====
Rank	Lane	Athlete	Nation	Reaction	Time	Notes
1	2	Kyron McMaster	British Virgin Islands	0.184	48.79	Q
2	5	Yasmani Copello	Turkey	0.188	49.00	Q
3	4	Shawn Rowe	Jamaica	0.157	49.18	Q, SB
4	6	David Kendziera	United States	0.192	49.23	Q
5	8	Joshua Abuaku	Germany	0.169	49.50	q, SB
6	3	Kazuki Kurokawa	Japan	0.154	50.30	
7	7	Jordin Andrade	Cape Verde	0.202	50.64	SB

==== Heat 5 ====
Rank	Lane	Athlete	Nation	Reaction	Time	Notes
1	6	Rai Benjamin	United States	0.209	48.60	Q
2	4	Rasmus Mägi	Estonia	0.160	48.73	Q
3	2	Sokwakhana Zazini	South Africa	0.147	49.51	Q, SB
4	7	Nick Smidt	Netherlands	0.181	49.55	Q
5	3	Vít Müller	Czech Republic	0.143	49.59	q
6	8	Takatoshi Abe	Japan	0.166	49.98	
7	5	M. P. Jabir	India	0.167	50.77	

=== Semifinals ===
Qualification rule: first 2 of each heat (Q) plus the 2 fastest times (q) qualified.

==== Semifinal 1 ====
Rank	Lane	Athlete	Nation	Reaction	Time	Notes
1	7	Karsten Warholm	Norway	0.156	47.30	Q
2	5	Rai Benjamin	United States	0.184	47.37	Q
3	4	Yasmani Copello	Turkey	0.183	47.88	q, SB
4	6	Thomas Barr	Ireland	0.151	48.26	SB
5	9	Kemar Mowatt	Jamaica	0.166	48.95	
6	8	Sokwakhana Zazini	South Africa	0.150	48.99	SB
7	3	Ludvy Vaillant	France	0.162	49.02	SB
8	2	Joshua Abuaku	Germany	0.179	49.93	

==== Semifinal 2 ====
Rank	Lane	Athlete	Nation	Reaction	Time	Notes
1	7	Alison dos Santos	Brazil	0.171	47.31	Q, AR
2	5	Abderrahman Samba	Qatar	0.188	47.47	Q, SB
3	4	Alessandro Sibilio	Italy	0.123	47.93	q, PB
4	6	Kenneth Selmon	United States	0.225	48.58	
5	8	Luke Campbell	Germany	0.153	48.62	PB
6	9	Shawn Rowe	Jamaica	0.204	48.83	PB
7	2	Nick Smidt	Netherlands	0.164	49.35	SB
8	3	Vít Müller	Czech Republic	0.145	49.69	

==== Semifinal 3 ====
Rank	Lane	Athlete	Nation	Reaction	Time	Notes
1	7	Kyron McMaster	British Virgin Islands	0.179	48.26	Q
2	6	Rasmus Mägi	Estonia	0.156	48.36	Q, NR
3	9	David Kendziera	United States	0.190	48.67	
4	2	Constantin Preis	Germany	0.186	49.10	
5	5	Abdelmalik Lahoulou	Algeria	0.125	49.14	
6	8	Hiromu Yamauchi	Japan	0.192	49.35	
7	3	Wilfried Happio	France	0.130	49.49	
8	4	Jaheel Hyde	Jamaica	0.159	1:27.38	

=== Final ===
Rank	Lane	Athlete	Nation	Reaction	Time	Notes
1st place, gold medalist(s)	6	Karsten Warholm	Norway	0.145	45.94	WR
2nd place, silver medalist(s)	5	Rai Benjamin	United States	0.168	46.17	AR
3rd place, bronze medalist(s)	7	Alison dos Santos	Brazil	0.156	46.72	AR
4	4	Kyron McMaster	British Virgin Islands	0.157	47.08	NR
5	8	Abderrahman Samba	Qatar	0.186	47.12	SB
6	3	Yasmani Copello	Turkey	0.166	47.81	=NR
7	9	Rasmus Mägi	Estonia	0.167	48.11	NR
8	2	Alessandro Sibilio	Italy	0.144	48.77	
