= U.S. Virgin Islands at the 2011 World Championships in Athletics =

Virgin Islands at the 2011 World Championships in Athletics
- WA code: ISV
- National federation: Virgin Islands Track & Field Federation
- Website: www.virginislandstrackandfield.org

in Daegu
- Competitors: 3
- Medals: Gold 0 Silver 0 Bronze 0 Total 0

World Championships in Athletics appearances
- 1976; 1980; 1983; 1987; 1991; 1993; 1995; 1997; 1999; 2001; 2003; 2005; 2007; 2009; 2011; 2013; 2015; 2017; 2019; 2022; 2023; 2025

The United States Virgin Islands competed at the 2011 World Championships in Athletics from August 27 to September 4 in Daegu, South Korea. A team of 3 athletes was announced to represent the country in the event. The team is led by sprinter Tabarie Henry.

== Results ==
=== Men ===
Athlete	Event	Preliminaries		Heats		Semifinals		Final	
Athlete	Event	Time Width Height	Rank	Time Width Height	Rank	Time Width Height	Rank	Time Width Height	Rank
Calvin Dascent	200 metres			21.15	42	Did not advance			
Tabarie Henry	400 metres			45.22	10	45.53	10	45.55	7

=== Women ===
Athlete	Event	Preliminaries		Heats		Semifinals		Final	
Athlete	Event	Time Width Height	Rank	Time Width Height	Rank	Time Width Height	Rank	Time Width Height	Rank
Allison Peter	200 metres			23.17	20	23.56	21	Did not advance	
