= U.S. Virgin Islands at the 2022 World Athletics Championships =

Virgin Islands at the 2022 World Championships in Athletics
- Flag of the U.S. Virgin Islands
- WA code: ISV

in Eugene, Oregon 24 July 2022
- Competitors: 1
- Medals: Gold 0 Silver 0 Bronze 0 Total 0

World Championships in Athletics appearances
- 1976; 1980; 1983; 1987; 1991; 1993; 1995; 1997; 1999; 2001; 2003; 2005; 2007; 2009; 2011; 2013; 2015; 2017; 2019; 2022; 2023; 2025

The United States Virgin Islands competed at the 2022 World Athletics Championships in Eugene, Oregon, United States, which were held from 15 to 24 July 2022. The athlete delegation of the country was composed of one competitor, Eduardo Terrance Garcia. There, he competed in the men's marathon. Overall, he placed 53rd out of the 63 long-distance runners that competed and 54 that completed the race.

== Background ==
The 2022 World Athletics Championships in Eugene, Oregon, United States, were held from 15 to 24 July 2022. To qualify for the World Championships, athletes had to reach an entry standard (e.g. time and distance), place in a specific position at select competitions, be a wild card entry, or qualify through their World Athletics Ranking at the end of the qualification period.

As the United States Virgin Islands did not meet any of the four standards, they could send either one male or one female athlete in one event of the Championships who has not yet qualified. The Virgin Islands Track & Field Federation selected long-distance runner Eduardo Terrance Garcia who held a personal best of 2:18:50 in the men's marathon, his entered event. His participation at the World Championships would be his first marathon in 2022. This was Garcia's first participation for the United States Virgin Islands at the World Championships.

== Results ==
=== Men ===
Garcia competed in the men's marathon on 17 July 2022 against 62 other competitors. There, he recorded a time of 2:23:16 for a season's best and placed 53rd out of the 54 long-distance runners that completed the race.

Track and road events

Athlete	Event	Final	
Athlete	Event	Result	Rank
Eduardo Terrance Garcia	Marathon	53	2:23.16 SB
