= U.S. Virgin Islands at the 1983 World Championships in Athletics =

- Flag of the United States Virgin Islands
- WA code: ISV

in Helsinki, Finland August 7–14, 1983
- Competitors: 2 (1 man and 1 woman) in 3 events
- Medals: Gold 0 Silver 0 Bronze 0 Total 0

World Championships in Athletics appearances (overview)
- 1976; 1980; 1983; 1987; 1991; 1993; 1995; 1997; 1999; 2001; 2003; 2005; 2007; 2009; 2011; 2013; 2015; 2017; 2019; 2022; 2023; 2025

The United States Virgin Islands competed at the 1983 World Championships in Athletics in Helsinki, Finland, which were held from 7 to 14 August 1983. The athlete delegation consisted of two athletes, sprinters Neville Hodge and Iyieachia Petrus. Hodge competed in the men's 100 metres and 200 metres while Petrus competed in the women's 400 metres. Neither of them won a medal.

== Background ==
The 1983 World Championships in Athletics were held at the Helsinki Olympic Stadium in Helsinki, Finland. Under the auspices of the International Amateur Athletics Federation, this was the first edition of the World Championships. It was held from 7 to 14 August 1983 and had 41 different events. Among the competing nations was the United States Virgin Islands. For this edition of the World Championships in Athletics, sprinters Neville Hodge and Iyieachia Petrus competed.

== Results ==
=== Men ===
Hodge first competed in the qualifying heats of the men's 100 metres on 7 August in the eighth heat, competing against six other athletes. There, he recorded a time of 10.59 seconds and placed sixth, not advancing to the quarterfinals. He then competed in the qualifying heats of the men's 200 metres on 12 August in the eighth heat, competing against six other athletes. There, he recorded a time of 21.38 seconds and placed fourth, qualifying for the quarterfinals. In the quarterfinals held the same day, Hodge competed in the fourth round against six other athletes. He recorded a time of 21.38 seconds and placed last, failing to advance further into competition.

Track and road events

Athlete	Event	Heat		Quarterfinal		Semifinal		Final	
Athlete	Event	Result	Rank	Result	Rank	Result	Rank	Result	Rank
Neville Hodge	100 metres	10.59w	6	Did not advance					
Neville Hodge	200 metres	21.38	4 q	21.38	7	Did not advance			

=== Women ===
Petrus competed in the qualifying heats of the women's 400 metres on 7 August in the fourth heat, competing against six other athletes. There, she recorded a time of 55.87 seconds and placed fifth, advancing further. The quarterfinals were held the following day and Petrus competed in the second round against six other athletes. She recorded a time of 57.24 seconds and placed last, not advancing to the semifinals. In an interview with Wallace Williams in 2010, she stated that her stint at the Championships was one of her best all-time performances.

Track and road events

Athlete	Event	Heat		Quarterfinal		Semifinal		Final	
Athlete	Event	Result	Rank	Result	Rank	Result	Rank	Result	Rank
Iyieachia Petrus	400 metres	55.87	5 Q	57.24	7	Did not advance			
