= United States Virgin Islands at the World Athletics Championships =

Virgin Islands at the World Athletics Championships
- WA code: ISV
- National federation: Virgin Islands Track & Field Federation
- Website: www.virginislandsolympics.org/sports/athletics/
- Medals: Gold 0 Silver 0 Bronze 0 Total 0

World Athletics Championships appearances
- 1976; 1980; 1983; 1987; 1991; 1993; 1995; 1997; 1999; 2001; 2003; 2005; 2007; 2009; 2011; 2013; 2015; 2017; 2019; 2022; 2023; 2025

The United States Virgin Islands has competed at the World Athletics Championships on fifteen occasions, skipping the 2001 edition. It also competed at the 1976 World Championships in Athletics. Its competing country code is ISV. The country has not won any medals at the competition. As of 2017 the country's athletes have reached a final of an event on two occasions. Its best performance is fourth place, by Tabarie Henry in the 2009 men's 400 metres final.
