= British Virgin Islands at the 2025 World Athletics Championships =

- Flag of the British Virgin Islands
- WA code: IVB

in Tokyo, Japan 13 September 2025 – 21 September 2025
- Competitors: 6 (4 men and 2 women)
- Medals: Gold 0 Silver 0 Bronze 0 Total 0

World Athletics Championships appearances (overview)
- 1983; 1987; 1991; 1993; 1995; 1997; 1999; 2001; 2003; 2005; 2007; 2009; 2011; 2013; 2015; 2017; 2019; 2022; 2023; 2025

The British Virgin Islands competed at the 2025 World Athletics Championships in Tokyo, Japan, from 13 to 21 September 2025. The British Virgin Islands entered 6 athletes: 4 men and 2 women.

== Results ==
Key

- Q = Qualified for the next round
- q = Qualified for the next round as a fastest loser or, in field events, by position without achieving the qualifying target
- NR = National record
- PB = Personal best
- SB = Season best
- N/A = Round not applicable for the event

=== Men ===
Track and road events

Athlete	Event	Heat		Semifinal		Final	
Athlete	Event	Result	Rank	Result	Rank	Result	Rank
Rikkoi Brathwaite	100 metres	10.23	4	Did not advance			
Jaleel Croal	200 metres	20.46	4	Did not advance			
Kyron McMaster	400 metres hurdles	49.89	6	Did not advance			

Field events

Athlete	Event	Qualification		Final	
Athlete	Event	Distance	Position	Distance	Position
Djimon Gumbs	Shot put	NM		Did not advance	

=== Women ===
Track and road events

Athlete	Event	Heat		Semifinal		Final	
Athlete	Event	Result	Rank	Result	Rank	Result	Rank
Beyoncé Defreitas	200 metres	23.30	5	Did not advance			

Field events

Athlete	Event	Qualification		Final	
Athlete	Event	Distance	Position	Distance	Position
Chantel Malone	Long jump	6.62	10 q	6.33	12
