= Athletics at the 2019 Summer Universiade – Men's 4 × 400 metres relay =

The men's 4 × 400 metres relay event at the 2019 Summer Universiade was held on 12 and 13 July at the Stadio San Paolo in Naples.

== Medalists ==
Gold	Silver	Bronze
Mexico; Fernando Arodi Vega; José Ricardo Jiménez; Édgar Ramírez; Valente Mendoza	South Africa; Gardeo Isaacs; Zakhithi Nene; Kefilwe Mogawane; Sokwakhana Zazini; Jon Seeliger*	Poland; Wiktor Suwara; Dariusz Kowaluk; Kajetan Duszyński; Patryk Dobek; Patryk Adamczyk*

*Athletes who competed in heats only

== Results ==
=== Heats ===
Qualification: First 2 teams in each heat (Q) and the next 2 fastest (q) qualified for the final.

Rank	Heat	Nation	Athletes	Time	Notes
1	3	South Africa	Kefilwe Mogawane, Zakhithi Nene, Jon Seeliger, Gardeo Isaacs	3:06.38	Q
2	3	Japan	Mitsuki Kawauchi, Jun Yamashita, Yoshihiro Someya, Naoki Kitadani	3:06.74	Q
3	3	Thailand	Apisit Chamsri, Nattapong Kongkraphan, Thipthanet Sripha, Phitchaya Sunthonthuam	3:06.75	q
4	2	Mexico	Fernando Arodi Vega, José Ricardo Jiménez, Édgar Ramírez, Valente Mendoza	3:07.31	Q
5	2	Poland	Kajetan Duszyński, Dariusz Kowaluk, Patryk Adamczyk, Wiktor Suwara	3:09.24	Q
6	1	Kazakhstan	Vyacheslav Zems, Andrey Sokolov, David Yefremov, Mikhail Litvin	3:09.44	Q, NR
7	1	Botswana	Lesedi Omondi, Xholani Talane, Thabiso Sekgopi, Cliffton Meshack	3:10.05	Q
8	2	Czech Republic	Michal Tlustý, Martin Tuček, Jan Friš, Vít Müller	3:10.77	q
9	1	Ghana	Etiam Kwaku Torgbenu, Baba Seidu Mammoudu, Neeyi Akesseh Arthur, Abdul Razak	3:11.08	
10	2	Australia	Sean Fitzsimmons, Mason Cohen, Zach Holdsworth, Jye Perrott	3:11.23	
11	1	South Korea	Mo Il-hwan, Seo Jae-yeong, Lee Jun-hyeok, Kim Hyun-bin	3:12.01	
12	1	China	Gong Kewei, Li Runyu, Wu Lei, Zhu Zilong	3:12.28	
13	3	Uganda	Joshua Jagalo, Williamson Oroma, Yahaya Maliamungu, Benson Okot	3:14.71	
14	2	Chile	Rodrigo Opazo, Rafael Muñoz, Enzo Faulbaum, Esteban González	3:20.32	
15	2	Sri Lanka	Kushan Dhanska, Ishan Olidurage, Yohan Range, Laknath Kavindu	3:21.89	
	3	Denmark	Frederik Peschardt, Emil Sondergaard, Nicolai Hartling, Mathias Mork	DQ	R170.20
	3	United States	Isaiah Palmer, Jahquez Durham, Michael Todd, Miles Green	DQ	R163.3a
	1	Senegal		DNS	
	1	Zambia		DNS	
	2	Saudi Arabia		DNS	
	3	Algeria		DNS	

=== Final ===
Rank	Nation	Athletes	Time	Notes
1st place, gold medalist(s)	Mexico	Fernando Arodi Vega, José Ricardo Jiménez, Édgar Ramírez, Valente Mendoza	3:02.89	NR
2nd place, silver medalist(s)	South Africa	Gardeo Isaacs, Zakhithi Nene, Kefilwe Mogawane, Sokwakhana Zazini	3:03.23	
3rd place, bronze medalist(s)	Poland	Wiktor Suwara, Dariusz Kowaluk, Kajetan Duszyński, Patryk Dobek	3:03.35	
4	Japan	Mitsuki Kawauchi, Jun Yamashita, Naoki Kitadani, Masaki Toyoda	3:04.34	
5	Czech Republic	Martin Tuček, Lukáš Hodboď, Filip Šnejdr, Vít Müller	3:06.78	
6	Thailand	Apisit Chamsri, Nattapong Kongkraphan, Thipthanet Sripha, Jirayu Pleenaram	3:07.00	
7	Botswana	Thabiso Sekgopi, Cliffton Meshack, Lesedi Omondi, Xholani Talane	3:07.03	
8	Kazakhstan	Vyacheslav Zems, Andrey Sokolov, David Yefremov, Mikhail Litvin	3:07.66	NR
