= Hiromu Yamauchi =

Japanese hurdler

Personal information
- Born: 24 August 1999 (age 26) Aizuwakamatsu, Japan

Sport
- Country: Japan
- Sport: Athletics
- Event: Hurdles

Hiromu Yamauchi (山内 大夢, born 24 August 1999) is a Japanese athlete. He competed in the men's 400 metres hurdles event at the 2020 Summer Olympics.
