= Shawn Rowe =

Jamaican athlete

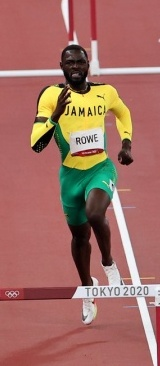
- Shawn Rowe competing in 2021

Personal information
- Nationality: Jamaican
- Born: 7 December 1992 (age 33)

Sport
- Sport: Track and field
- Event: 400m hurdles
- Coached by: Sandy Chapman

Shawn Rowe (born 7 December 1992) is a Jamaican athlete who competes predominantly in the 400 metres hurdles.

== Career ==
Rowe attended Saint Augustine's University in North Carolina where he was a four-time NCAA Division II national champion and six-time first-team All-American, as well as earning a criminal justice degree.

After finishing second in the Jamaican Olympic trials in June 2021, Rowe was selected in the Jamaican team for the delayed 2020 Summer Games in Tokyo. He ran a 49.18 seasons best to reach the semi-finals. He was also a fourth-place finisher and CAC and NACAC championships in 2018.

He is also an author of a book called Hurdling My Barriers.
