= Luke Campbell (hurdler) =

German-American hurdler

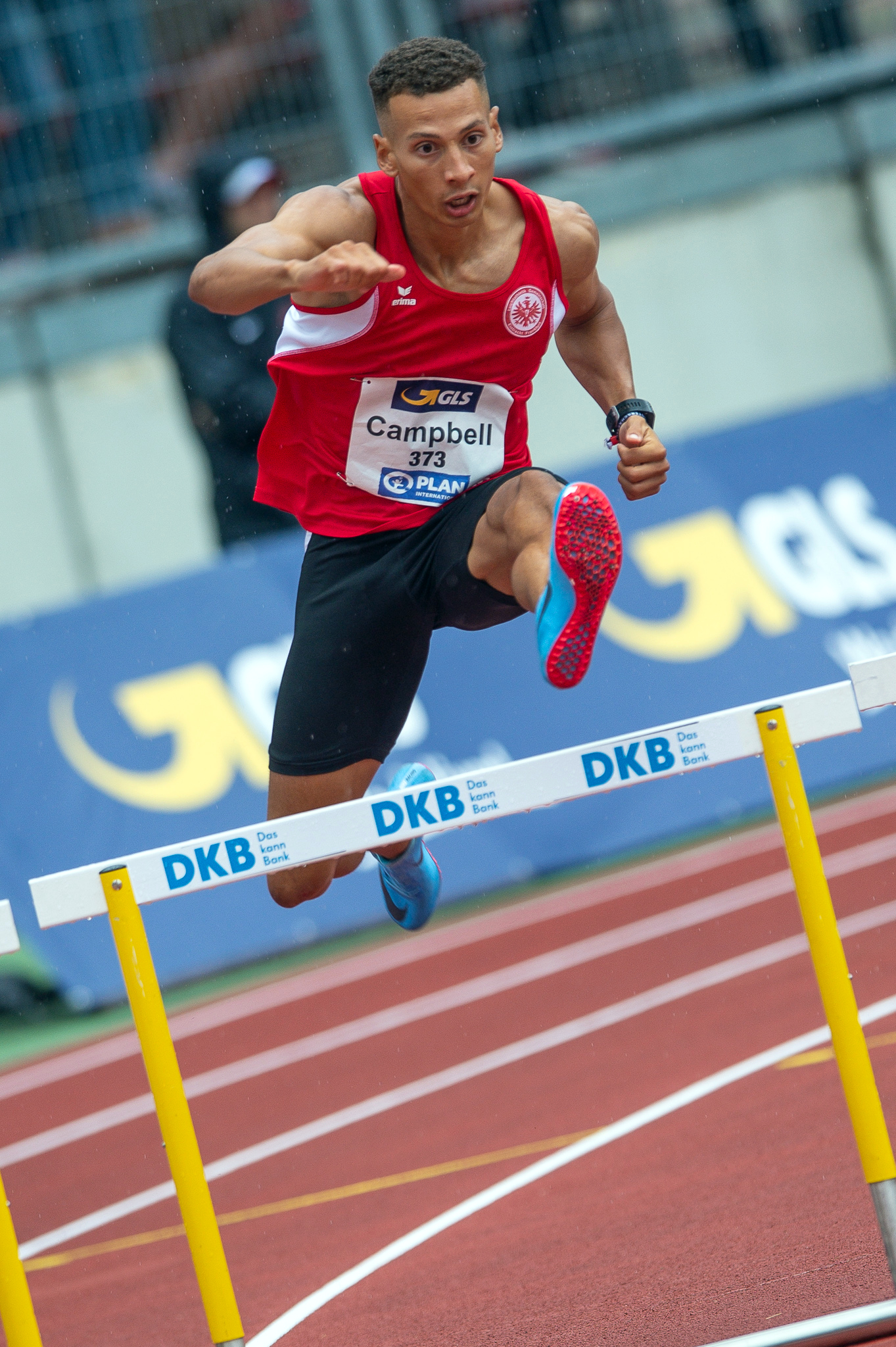
- Luke Campbell in 2018

Personal information
- Born: 22 November 1994 (age 31) Meschede, Germany
- Education: Salisbury University
- Height: 1.88 m (6 ft 2 in)
- Weight: 79 kg (174 lb)

Sport
- Sport: Athletics
- Event: 400 metres hurdles
- Club: LG Eintracht Frankfurt

Luke Campbell (born 22 November 1994) is a German athlete specialising in the 400 metres hurdles. He represented Germany at the 2018 European Championships in Berlin narrowly missing the final. He later competed at the 2019 World Championships in Doha reaching the semifinals.

He has an American father and a German mother.

His personal best in the event is 49.14 seconds set in La Chaux-de-Fonds in 2018.

== International competitions ==
Year	Competition	Venue	Position	Event	Notes
Representing Germany
2018	European Championships	Berlin, Germany	9th (sf)	400 m hurdles	49.20
2019	World Championships	Doha, Qatar	21st (sf)	400 m hurdles	50.00
2021	Olympic Games	Tokyo, Japan	11th (sf)	400 m hurdles	48.62
2021	Olympic Games	Tokyo, Japan	16th (h)	4 × 400 m relay	3:03.62
