= Alison dos Santos =

Brazilian hurdler (born 2000)

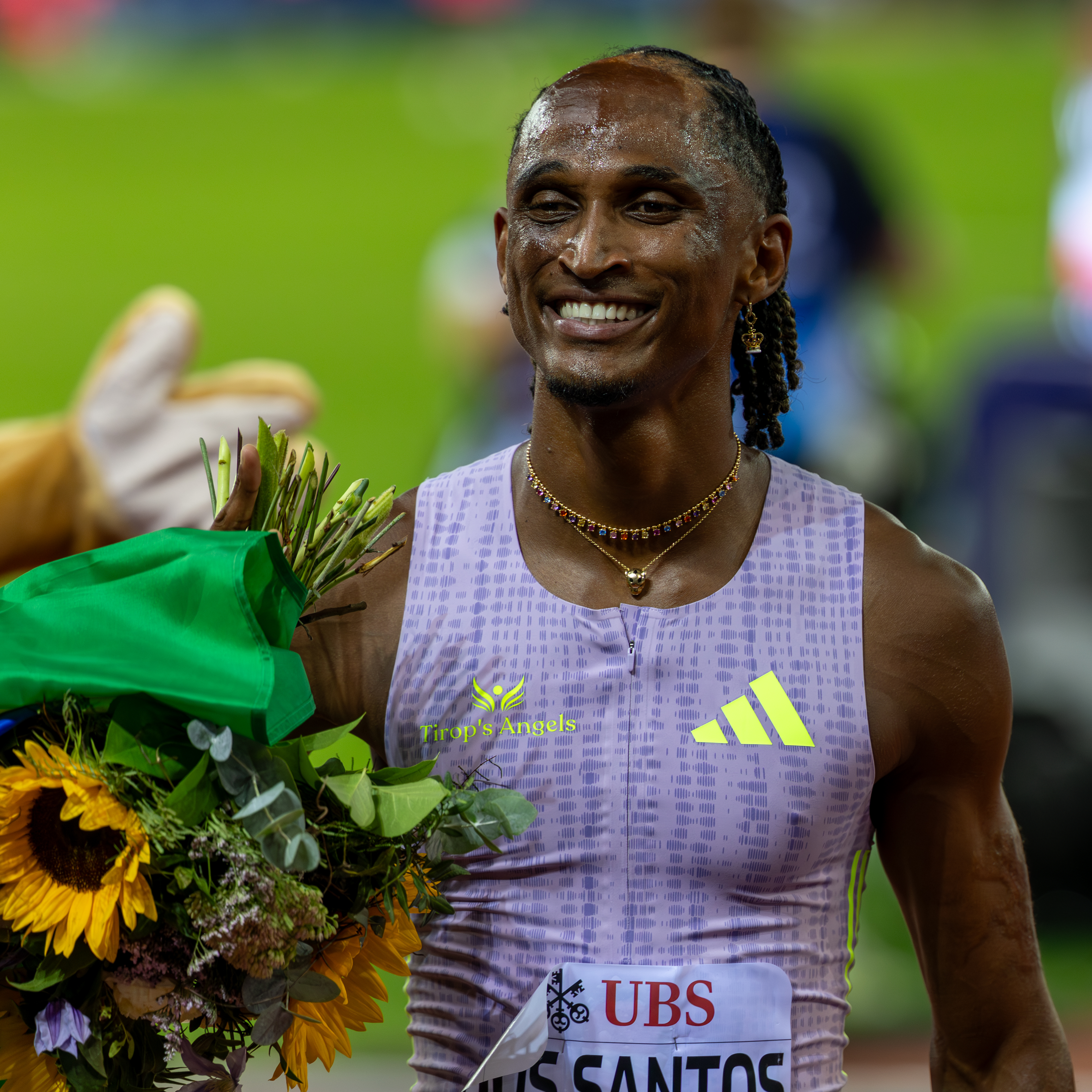
- Dos Santos at the 2026 Weltklasse Zürich

Personal information
- Full name: Alison Brendom Alves dos Santos
- Nickname: Piu
- Born: 3 June 2000 (age 26) São Joaquim da Barra, São Paulo, Brazil
- Height: 2.00 m (6 ft 7 in)

Sport
- Country: Brazil
- Sport: Athletics
- Event: 400 m hurdles
- Club: Pinheiros-SP
- Coached by: Felipe de Siqueira da Silva

Achievements and titles
- Highest world ranking: 1st (2024)
- Personal bests: 400 m hurdles: 45.80 WR (Zurich 2026); 300 m hurdles: 33.01 AR (Shaoxing 2026); 400 m: 44.38 (Gainesville 2026); 200 m: 20.39 (Gainesville 2026)
Medal record
Men's athletics
Representing Brazil
Olympic Games
Bronze medal – third place	2020 Tokyo	400 m hurdles
Bronze medal – third place	2024 Paris	400 m hurdles
World Championships
Gold medal – first place	2022 Eugene	400 m hurdles
Silver medal – second place	2025 Tokyo	400 m hurdles
World Ultimate Championship
First place	2026 Budapest	400 m hurdles
World Relays
Silver medal – second place	2021 Chorzów	4 × 400 m mixed
Diamond League
First place	2022	400 m hurdles
First place	2024	400 m hurdles
First place	2026	400 m hurdles
Pan American Games
Gold medal – first place	2019 Lima	400 m hurdles
South American Games
Gold medal – first place	2026 Santa Fe	400 m
South American Championships
Gold medal – first place	2019 Lima	400 m hurdles
Silver medal – second place	2019 Lima	4 × 400 m relay
South American U23 Championships
Gold medal – first place	2018 Cuenca	400 m hurdles
Silver medal – second place	2018 Cuenca	400 m
Silver medal – second place	2018 Cuenca	4 × 400 m relay
World U20 Championships
Bronze medal – third place	2018 Tampere	400 m hurdles
Pan American U20 Championships
Gold medal – first place	2019 San José	400 m hurdles
South American U20 Championships
Gold medal – first place	2019 Cali	400 m
World U18 Championships
Gold medal – first place	2017 Nairobi	4 × 400 m mixed
Universiade
Gold medal – first place	2019 Naples	400 m hurdles

Alison Brendom Alves dos Santos (born 3 June 2000) is a Brazilian hurdler and sprinter specialising in the 400 metres hurdles. Competing in the 400 metres hurdles, he is the 2022 world champion and won the bronze medal at the 2020 and 2024 Summer Olympics. On 27 August 2026, dos Santos broke the world record in the event with a time of 45.80 seconds.

In addition to his world record, dos Santos holds the South American under-20 record in the 400 metres hurdles and the world best in the rarely run 200 metres hurdles. A gold medalist at the Pan American Games and South American Championships in 2019, he was also the 2022, 2024 and 2026 Diamond League champion.

== Early life ==
Dos Santos was born on 3 June 2000 in São Joaquim da Barra, São Paulo, Brazil, to father Gerson and mother Sueli. Dos Santos has three sisters named Drieli, Andrieli, and Anieli. His parents later separated.

At 10 months old, while spending time at his grandparents' home, dos Santos suffered third-degree burns after accidentally tipping over a pan of hot oil, which his grandmother prepared to fry fish; she also suffered severe burns when trying to intervene. Dos Santos was rushed to hospital by his grandfather, where he would stay for the next four months. The incident left him with visible scars on his forehead, scalp, face, chest, and left arm. He wears a cap or hat on his head during training to protect the area from the sun.

Dos Santos was shy growing up, partly due to his scars, and stayed in his room alone until he started to become involved in sports. As a child, he practised judo from age six to fourteen. Although he loved judo, the high cost associated with each training session caused him to abandon it. A childhood friend soon convinced him to switch to athletics. Dos Santos began athletics in 2013 at Pedro Badran State Technical School (ETEC) and was coached by Ana Fidélis. Within months, he no longer did athletics out of a financial need but because he truly enjoyed it and even made friends throughout the city, states, and country. At the age of 16, he was already competing among adults. Dos Santos earned the nickname "Piu" early in his career. Explaining the nickname's origin, he recounted joining a local athletics project one week after the departure of a different athlete. This athlete resembled a homeless man named Piu known to people in São Joaquim da Barra, so teammates jokingly decided to call dos Santos by the same name.

== Career ==
=== 2017 ===
Dos Santos competed at the 2017 IAAF World U18 Championships in the 400 metres hurdles, finishing fifth in the final.

=== 2018 ===
Dos Santos won a bronze medal at the 2018 World U20 Championships in the 400 m hurdles with a time of 49.78 seconds, a personal best at the time.

=== 2019 ===
At just 19 years old, he participated in the 2019 Pan American Games, held in Lima, Peru, where he won the 400 m hurdles event, breaking the South American under-20 record with a time of 48.45. It was the fourth best time in the world at that moment, and with that, dos Santos qualified for the 2020 Summer Olympics. He had already won gold in the same event, at the 2019 Summer Universiade, weeks before.

In September 2019, dos Santos went to the 2019 World Athletics Championships in Doha, Qatar, where he won the 400 m hurdles semifinal in 48.35, breaking his personal record again and going to the final with the second best overall time. The last time a Brazilian had reached the final of this event in the Worlds was with Eronilde de Araújo, in 1999. In the final, he broke his personal record again, finishing in seventh place with a time of 48.28.

=== 2021 ===
In April 2021, he broke his own Brazilian record again with a time of 48.15 in Des Moines, Iowa, United States. On 9 May 2021, he broke the South American record that had belonged to Panama's Bayano Kamani (47.84) since 2005. Dos Santos obtained the 47.68 mark in the Mt.Sac stage of the Continental Athletics Tour in California. On 28 May 2021, he again broke the South American record with a time of 47.57 in Doha, participating in the 2021 Diamond League. This time placed him as third in the world ranking. He even topped the list in April. The time of 47.57 already placed him as 22nd best runner in the race of all time. On 1 July 2021, in the Oslo stage of the Diamond League, he again lowered his own South American record, with a time of 47.38. This time placed him as the 15th-best runner in the history of the race. He improved this record with 47.34, three days later, winning in Stockholm.

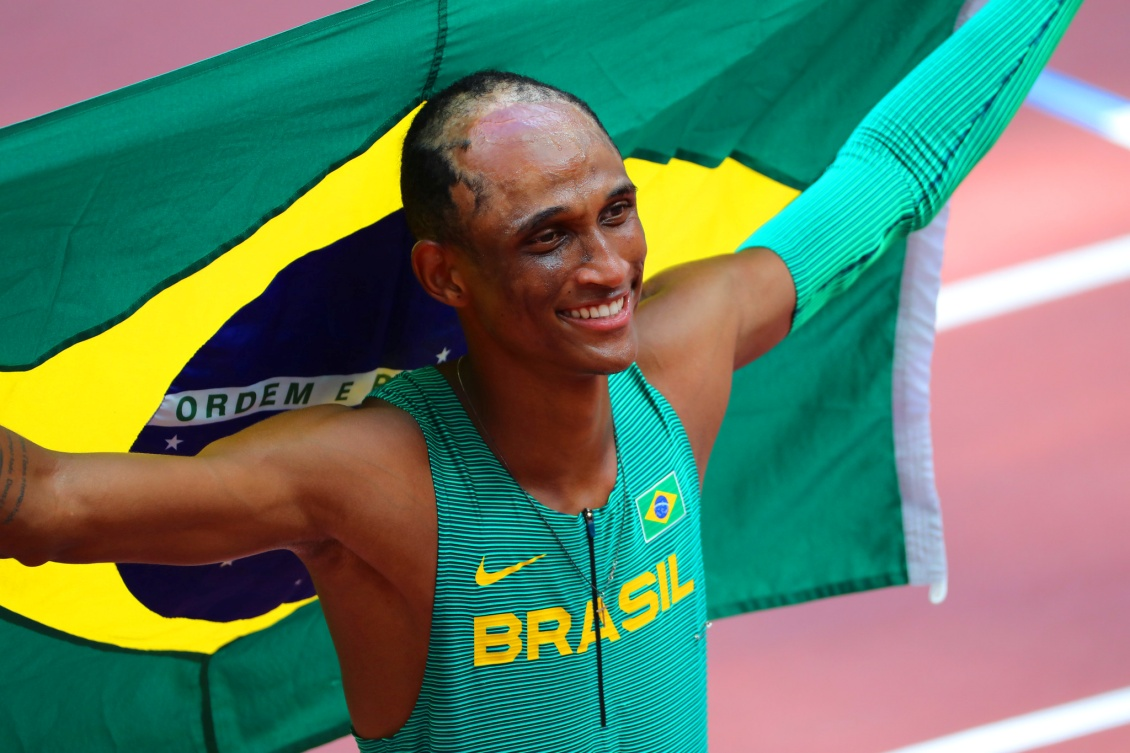
Dos Santos celebrating his bronze medal at the 2021 Summer Olympics

At the delayed 2020 Summer Olympics in Tokyo, dos Santos qualified for the final of the 400 metres hurdles, breaking the South American record with a time of 47.31. In the final, he won the bronze medal, breaking the South American record again by a large margin, with a time of 46.72, lowering his time by 0.6 seconds. The race was the strongest in 400 m hurdles history, with the three medalists—Karsten Warholm, Rai Benjamin and dos Santos—running the three best times in the history of the event, all beating Kevin Young's old world record which had lasted almost 30 years and had only fallen a month before the Olympics. Dos Santos became the third best in the history of the race at just 21 years old.

=== 2022 ===
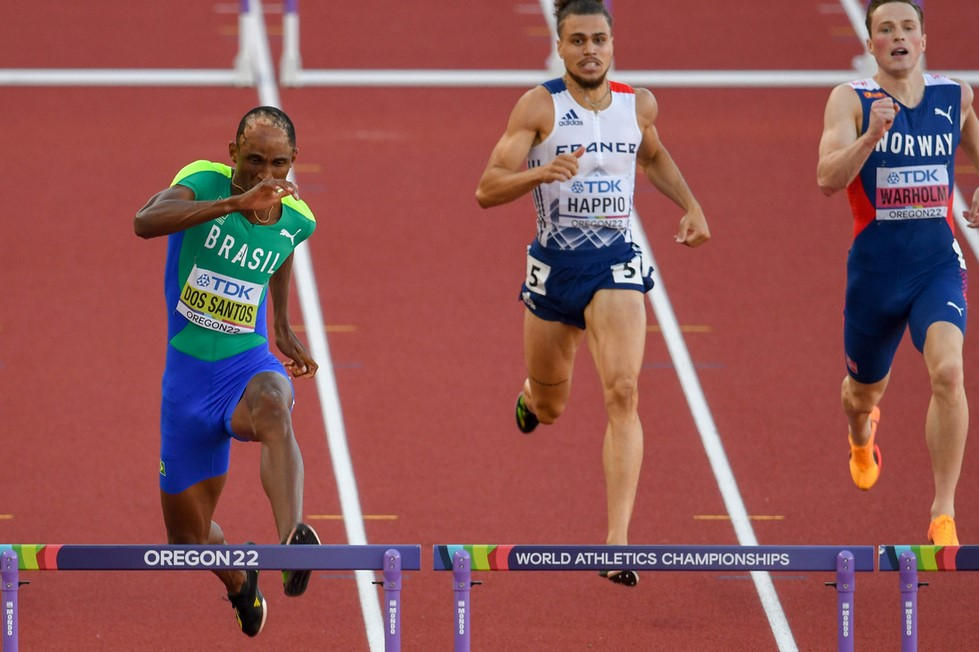
Dos Santos (left) racing at the 2022 World Athletics Championships

In April 2022, he made the second best Brazilian mark in history in the 400 m with a time of 44.54 seconds. In May 2022, he won a gold medal in the Doha stage of the Diamond League with a time of 47.24, defeating Rai Benjamin. In June 2022, he won a gold medal in the Stockholm stage of the Diamond League with a time of 46.80.

On 19 July 2022, in the 2022 World Athletics Championships in Eugene, Oregon, he broke the South American record again and the World Championship record in the 400 metres hurdles with a time of 46.29, becoming the world champion, defeating Warholm and Benjamin. It was the first men's gold in the history of Brazil in the World Athletics Championships, and he became only the second Brazilian in history to be the world champion in outdoor athletics, the first being the pole vaulter Fabiana Murer eleven years earlier in Daegu, South Korea. Dos Santos was 0.13s from breaking Benjamin's Americas record and 0.36s from breaking Warholm's world record. At the Diamond Race final in Zürich in September, he became the Diamond League champion in his specialist event.

=== 2023 ===
On 14 February 2023, he underwent surgery to correct a meniscus tear in his right knee. His recovery period was expected to last between 8 and 12 weeks. He came back on 16 July 2023, with his first race of the season being the Silesia stage of the Diamond League. He ran in the 400 m and finished in third place with a time of 44.73. Close to a week after, he improved upon this when he ran the 400 m hurdles in the Monaco stage of the Diamond League and finished in second place on 21 July 2023. Next, the 2023 World Athletics Championships in Budapest, Hungary followed in August. He won his 400 metres hurdles heat in 48.12 to qualify for the semifinal where he finished second with a time of 47.38. During the final, he hit two barriers (in the eighth and tenth) and finished in fifth place with a time of 48.10. He asked to be exempt from the 2023 Pan American Games so as not to jeopardize his preparation for the Olympics.

=== 2024 ===
On 10 May, at the Doha Stage of the 2024 Diamond League, he crossed the finish line with a time of 46.86 and took 1st place, breaking the league record.

On 31 May, at the Oslo stage of the Diamond League, he defeated Warholm within his own country and took the lead in the 400 m hurdles ranking for the year, with a time of 46.63.

He won the bronze medal at the 2024 Summer Olympics with a time of 47.26 to finish behind Benjamin and Warholm.

In September 2024, it was announced that he had signed up for the inaugural season of the Michael Johnson founded Grand Slam Track.

=== 2025 ===
Dos Santos was crowned the Grand Slam champion in the "long hurdles" race group at the league's first two meets in Kingston and Miami. On 17 May 2025, dos Santos set a new world best time of 21.85 seconds in the rarely run 200 metres hurdles. At the Philadelphia Slam, he finished second in his race group behind Trevor Bassitt.

Following victory at the Prefontaine Classic in July, dos Santos won the 400 metres hurdles silver medal at the 2025 World Athletics Championships, running 46.84 to finish second behind Benjamin.

=== 2026 ===
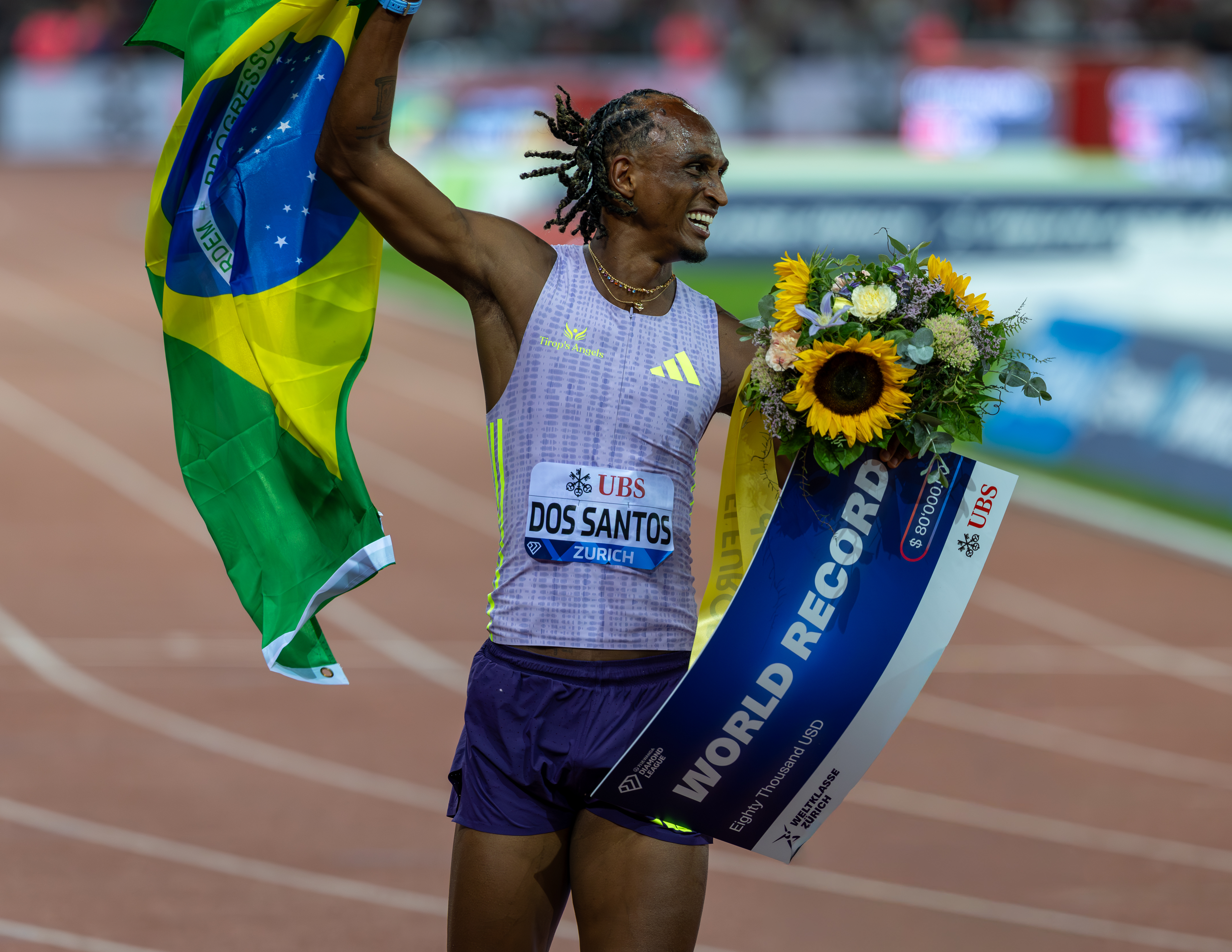
Dos Santos celebrating after breaking the men's 400 metres hurdles world record at the 2026 Weltklasse Zürich

Dos Santos opened his 2026 season in Gainesville, Florida, where he set new personal bests in the 200 metres and the 400 metres, almost breaking the Brazilian record in the latter event. At the 2026 Shanghai Diamond League, he beat Warholm on his way to setting another personal best, this time in the 300 metres hurdles.

On 27 August 2026, at the Zürich Diamond League, dos Santos broke the 400 metres hurdles world record with a time of 45.80 seconds, ahead of the previous record holder, Warholm. Dos Santos became the second man to run under 46 seconds in the event. It was one of two world records achieved in Zürich, with Masai Russell breaking the 100 metres hurdles record later in the meet. Reflecting on his strong season, dos Santos noted that tactical changes in training allowed him to execute his race plan and break the world record. "I felt like [I could break the world record] throughout the whole season. Today I was able to execute," dos Santos said, explaining that "I’m starting faster, I’m finishing stronger, and that is what I had to do to break a world record."

In September, he won the 2026 World Athletics Ultimate Championship with another sub-46 time, defeating Warholm and Benjamin and clocking the third-fastest time in the event's history: 45.98 seconds.

== Achievements ==
Information taken from World Athletics profile unless otherwise noted.

=== Personal bests ===
Personal best times of Alison dos Santos
Event	Time	Location	Date	Record	Notes
200 metres	20.39	Gainesville, Florida, U.S.	17 April 2026		(Wind: +0.7 m/s)
400 metres	44.38	Gainesville, Florida, U.S.	18 April 2026		
200 metres hurdles straight	21.85	Atlanta, U.S.	17 May 2025	WB	(Wind: +1.5 m/s)
300 metres hurdles	33.01	Shaoxing, China	16 May 2026	AR	
400 metres hurdles	45.80	Zürich, Switzerland	27 August 2026	WR	
400 metres hurdles (84.0cm)	52.45	Bragança Paulista, Brazil	25 June 2017		
4 × 400 metres relay	3:02.99	Gainesville, Florida, U.S.	30 March 2024		
Mixed 4 × 400 metres relay	3:16.53	Chorzów, Poland	1 May 2021		

=== International competitions ===
Representing Brazil
Year	Competition	Venue	Position	Event	Time	Notes
2017	World U18 Championships	Nairobi, Kenya	5th	400 m hurdles	53.98	
2017	World U18 Championships	Nairobi, Kenya	1st	4 × 400 m mixed	3:21.71	
2018	World U20 Championships	Tampere, Finland	3rd	400 m hurdles	49.78	
2018	South American U23 Championships	Cuenca, Ecuador	2nd	400 m	45.97	
2018	South American U23 Championships	Cuenca, Ecuador	1st	400 m hurdles	50.56	
2018	South American U23 Championships	Cuenca, Ecuador	2nd	4 × 400 m relay	3:09.90	
2019	South American Championships	Lima, Peru	1st	400 m hurdles	49.88	
2019	South American Championships	Lima, Peru	2nd	4 × 400 m relay	3:04.13	
2019	South American U20 Championships	Cali, Colombia	1st	400 m	45.78	CR
2019	Universiade	Naples, Italy	1st	400 m hurdles	48.57	AU20R
2019	Pan American U20 Championships	San José, Costa Rica	1st	400 m hurdles	48.49	AU20R
2019	Pan American Games	Lima, Peru	1st	400 m hurdles	48.45	AU20R
2019	World Championships	Doha, Qatar	7th	400 m hurdles	48.28	AU20R
2021	World Relays	Chorzów, Poland	2nd	4 × 400 m mixed	3:17.54	
2021	Olympic Games	Tokyo, Japan	3rd	400 m hurdles	46.72	AR
2022	World Championships	Eugene, United States	1st	400 m hurdles	46.29	CR AR
2023	World Championships	Budapest, Hungary	5th	400 m hurdles	48.10	
2024	Olympic Games	Paris, France	3rd	400 m hurdles	47.26	
2025	World Championships	Tokyo, Japan	2nd	400 m hurdles	46.84	
2025	World Championships	Tokyo, Japan	–	4 × 400 m relay	DQ	
2026	World Ultimate Championship	Budapest, Hungary	1st	400 m hurdles	45.98	
2026	South American Games	Santa Fe, Argentina	1st	400 m	44.61	GR

=== Circuit performances ===
- Diamond League

400 metres hurdles champion (2): 2022, 2024
400 metres hurdles wins, other events specified in parentheses:

- 2021 (2): Stockholm Bauhausgalan (AR), Brussels Memorial Van Damme
- 2022 (7): Doha Diamond League (MR WL), Eugene Prefontaine Classic (WL), Oslo Bislett Games, Stockholm (MR WL), Chorzów Kamila Skolimowska Memorial (MR), Brussels, Zürich Weltklasse
- 2024 (6): Doha (MR WL), Oslo (WL), Stockholm, Meeting de Paris, London Athletics Meet, Brussels
- 2025 (1): Eugene (SB)
- 2026 (6): Shanghai Diamond League (300 metres hurdles; AR WL), Xiamen Diamond League (WL), Stockholm, Oslo, Chorzów (WL), Zürich (WR)

Grand Slam Track results
Slam	Race group	Event	Pl.	Time	Prize money
2025 Kingston Slam	Long hurdles	400 m hurdles	1st	47.61	US$100,000
2025 Kingston Slam	Long hurdles	400 m	1st	45.52	US$100,000
2025 Miami Slam	Long hurdles	400 m hurdles	1st	47.97	US$100,000
2025 Miami Slam	Long hurdles	400 m	1st	44.53	US$100,000
2025 Philadelphia Slam	Long hurdles	400 m hurdles	1st	48.11	US$50,000
2025 Philadelphia Slam	Long hurdles	400 m	3rd	45.63	US$50,000

Records
Preceded by (Norway) Karsten Warholm	Men's 400 m hurdles world record holder 27 August 2026 – present	Incumbent
