= U.S. Virgin Islands at the 2017 World Championships in Athletics =

Virgin Islands at the 2017 World Championships in Athletics
- Flag of the United States Virgin Islands
- WA code: ISV
- National federation: Virgin Islands Track & Field Federation
- Website: virginislandspace.org/vitff.html

in London, United Kingdom 4–13 August 2017
- Competitors: 1 (1 man and 0 women) in 1 event
- Medals: Gold 0 Silver 0 Bronze 0 Total 0

World Championships in Athletics appearances
- 1976; 1980; 1983; 1987; 1991; 1993; 1995; 1997; 1999; 2001; 2003; 2005; 2007; 2009; 2011; 2013; 2015; 2017; 2019; 2022; 2023; 2025

The United States Virgin Islands competed at the 2017 World Championships in Athletics in London, United Kingdom, from 4–13 August 2017.

== Results ==
=== Men ===
Track and road events

Athlete	Event	Heat		Semifinal		Final	
Athlete	Event	Result	Rank	Result	Rank	Result	Rank
Eddie Lovett	110 metres hurdles	13.41 SB	12 Q	13.67	18	Did not advance	
