= U.S. Virgin Islands at the 2009 World Championships in Athletics =

Virgin Islands at the 2009 World Championships in Athletics
- WA code: ISV

in Berlin
- Medals: Gold 0 Silver 0 Bronze 0 Total 0

World Championships in Athletics appearances
- 1976; 1980; 1983; 1987; 1991; 1993; 1995; 1997; 1999; 2001; 2003; 2005; 2007; 2009; 2011; 2013; 2015; 2017; 2019; 2022; 2023; 2025

The United States Virgin Islands compete at the 2009 World Championships in Athletics from 15–23 August in Berlin.

== Team selection ==
Track and road events

Event	Athletes	
Event	Men	Women
100 metres	Adrian Durant	LaVerne Jones-Ferrette; Courtney Patterson
200 metres		LaVerne Jones-Ferrette
400 metres	Tabarie Henry	
