= Patryk Adamczyk =

Polish athletics competitor

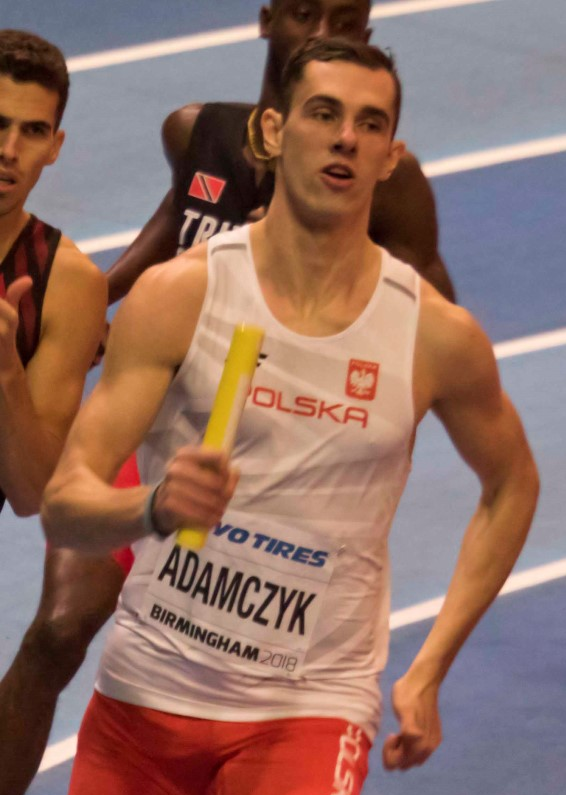

Personal information
- Born: 5 January 1994 (age 32)
- Height: 1.92 m (6 ft 4 in)
- Weight: 80 kg (176 lb)

Sport
- Sport: Athletics
- Event: 400 metres hurdles
- Club: UKS Kusy Warszawa (–2013); RLTL ZTE Radom (2016–)
- Coached by: Robert Kędziora
Medal record
World Indoor Championships
Gold medal – first place	2018 Birmingham	4 × 400 m
Summer Universiade
Bronze medal – third place	2019 Naples	400 m relay

Patryk Adamczyk (born 5 January 1994) is a Polish athlete competing in the 400 metres hurdles. He represented his country at the 2016 European Championships reaching the semifinals.

== International competitions ==
Year	Competition	Venue	Position	Event	Notes
Representing Poland
2013	European Junior Championships	Rieti, Italy	4th	400 m hurdles	50.89
2016	European Championships	Amsterdam, Netherlands	18th (sf)	400 m hurdles	50.12
2018	World Indoor Championships	Birmingham, United Kingdom	3rd (h)	4 × 400 m relay	3:05.24
2019	Universiade	Naples, Italy	14th (sf)	400 m hurdles	51.04
2019	Universiade	Naples, Italy	5th (h)	4 × 400 m relay	3:09.24

== Personal bests ==
Outdoor

- 400 metres – 47.48 (Siedlce 2016)
- 400 metres hurdles – 49.72 (Jelenia Góra 2016)

Indoor

- 400 metres – 46.96 (Toruń 2018)
