= Jon Seeliger =

South African sprinter

Personal information
- Born: 27 April 1995 (age 31)
- Education: University of Pretoria
- Height: 1.78 m (5 ft 10 in)
- Weight: 74 kg (163 lb)

Sport
- Sport: Track and field
- Event: 400 metres
Medal record
Men's athletics
Representing South Africa
World Relays
Silver medal – second place	2019 Yokohama	4×200 m
African Championships
Bronze medal – third place	2016 Durban	4×400 m
Summer Universiade
Silver medal – second place	2019 Naples	4×400 m

Jon Randolph Seeliger (born 27 April 1995) is a South African sprinter. He competed in the 4 × 400 metres relay at the 2016 IAAF World Indoor Championships.

== Competition record ==
Year	Competition	Venue	Position	Event	Notes
Representing South Africa
2013	African Junior Championships	Bambous, Mauritius	5th	400 m	47.89
2014	World Junior Championships	Eugene, United States	49th (h)	200 m	21.70
2014	World Junior Championships	Eugene, United States	12th (h)	4 × 100 m relay	40.64
2014	World Junior Championships	Eugene, United States	7th (h)	4 × 400 m relay	3:09.11^{1}
2015	Universiade	Gwangju, South Korea	9th (h)	400 m	46.31
2015	Universiade	Gwangju, South Korea	1st (h)	4 × 400 m relay	3:04.79^{1}
2016	World Indoor Championships	Portland, United States	7th (h)	4 × 400 m relay	3:08.45
2016	African Championships	Durban, South Africa	3rd	4 × 400 m relay	3:04.73
2019	World Relays	Yokohama, Japan	2nd (h)	4 × 200 m relay	1:20.64
2019	Universiade	Naples, Italy	20th (sf)	400 m	47.60
2019	Universiade	Naples, Italy	–	4 × 100 m relay	DNF
2019	Universiade	Naples, Italy	1st (h)	4 × 400 m relay	3:06.38

^{1}Disqualified in the final

== Personal bests ==
Outdoor

- 200 metres – 20.71 (+0.2 m/s, Pretoria 2014)
- 400 metres – 45.85 (Stellenbosch 2015)
