= Athletics at the 2019 Summer Universiade – Men's 400 metres hurdles =

Athletics competition

The men's 400 metres hurdles event at the 2019 Summer Universiade was held on 9, 10 and 11 July at the Stadio San Paolo in Naples.

== Medalists ==
Gold	Silver	Bronze
Alison Santos; Brazil	Sokwakhana Zazini; South Africa	Patryk Dobek; Poland

== Results ==
=== Heats ===
Qualification: First 3 in each heat (Q) and next 4 fastest (q) qualified for the semifinals.

Rank	Heat	Name	Nationality	Time	Notes
1	4	Patryk Dobek	Poland	49.65	Q
2	2	Sokwakhana Zazini	South Africa	50.44	Q
3	2	Fernando Arodi Vega	Mexico	50.46	Q
4	4	Vít Müller	Czech Republic	50.50	Q, SB
5	4	Masaki Toyoda	Japan	50.67	Q
6	4	Joshua Abuaku	Germany	50.80	q
7	3	Kakeru Inoue	Japan	50.88	Q
8	2	Patryk Adamczyk	Poland	50.89	Q, SB
9	1	Emmanuel Niño	Costa Rica	50.97	Q
10	2	Alain-Hervé Mfomkpa	Switzerland	51.05	q
11	4	Yu Chia-hsuan	Chinese Taipei	51.05	q
12	3	Alison Santos	Brazil	51.05	Q
13	1	Constant Pretorius	South Africa	51.10	Q
14	1	Peng Ming-yang	Chinese Taipei	51.21	Q
15	1	Dany Brand	Switzerland	51.24	q
16	3	Nicolai Hartling	Denmark	51.25	Q
17	3	Miles Green	United States	51.29	
18	1	Baba Seidu Mammoudu	Ghana	51.41	
19	2	Martin Tuček	Czech Republic	51.56	
20	3	Kim Hyun-bin	South Korea	52.28	
21	2	Ow Yeong Wei Bin	Singapore	52.44	NR
22	2	Vlad Dulcescu	Romania	52.52	
23	1	Jakub Bottlik	Slovakia	52.52	
24	3	Shokhrukh Baratov	Uzbekistan	52.69	
25	4	Joachim Sandberg	Norway	53.51	
26	3	Hassan Al-Muryhil	Saudi Arabia	58.17	
27	1	Yahya Jahwa	Saudi Arabia	58.99	
28	4	Ragheb Raad	Lebanon	1:01.83	

=== Semifinals ===
Qualification: First 3 in each heat (Q) and next 2 fastest (q) qualified for the final.

Rank	Heat	Name	Nationality	Time	Notes
1	2	Sokwakhana Zazini	South Africa	49.46	Q
2	1	Patryk Dobek	Poland	49.70	Q
3	2	Alison Santos	Brazil	49.72	Q
4	1	Masaki Toyoda	Japan	49.80	Q, SB
5	2	Vít Müller	Czech Republic	49.84	Q, SB
6	1	Dany Brand	Switzerland	50.15	Q
7	1	Fernando Arodi Vega	Mexico	50.19	q
8	2	Joshua Abuaku	Germany	50.24	q, SB
9	1	Yu Chia-hsuan	Chinese Taipei	50.35	
10	1	Emmanuel Niño	Costa Rica	50.50	
11	1	Nicolai Hartling	Denmark	50.51	
12	2	Kakeru Inoue	Japan	50.82	
13	1	Constant Pretorius	South Africa	51.01	
14	2	Patryk Adamczyk	Poland	51.04	
15	2	Peng Ming-yang	Chinese Taipei	51.54	
	2	Alain-Hervé Mfomkpa	Switzerland	DNF	

=== Final ===
Official Video

Rank	Lane	Name	Nationality	Time	Notes
1st place, gold medalist(s)	3	Alison Santos	Brazil	48.57	AU20R
2nd place, silver medalist(s)	4	Sokwakhana Zazini	South Africa	48.73	AU20R
3rd place, bronze medalist(s)	5	Patryk Dobek	Poland	48.99	
4	6	Masaki Toyoda	Japan	49.27	SB
5	1	Fernando Arodi Vega	Mexico	49.32	NR
6	8	Dany Brand	Switzerland	49.83	
7	2	Joshua Abuaku	Germany	50.44	
8	7	Vít Müller	Czech Republic	50.86	
