= Sokwakhana Zazini =

South African athlete (born 2000)

Personal information
- Born: January 23, 2000 (age 26) Burgersdorp

Sport
- Sport: Athletics
- Event: 400 m hurdles
Medal record
Men's athletics
Representing South Africa
African Championships
Gold medal – first place	2022 Mauritius	400 m hurdles
Summer Universiade
Silver medal – second place	2019 Napoli	400 m hurdles
Silver medal – second place	2019 Napoli	4 × 400 m relay
World U20 Championships
Gold medal – first place	2018 Tampere	400 m hurdles
African U20 Championships
Gold medal – first place	2019 Abidjan	400 m hurdles
World U18 Championships
Gold medal – first place	2017 Nairobi	400 m hurdles

Sokwakhana Zazini (born 23 January 2000) is a South African athlete specialising in the 400 metres hurdles. He won gold medals at the 2017 World U18 Championships and the 2018 World U20 Championships. In 2019, he won a silver medal at the Universiade.

He competed in the men's 400 metres hurdles at the 2020 Summer Olympics.

== International competitions ==
Year	Competition	Venue	Position	Event	Notes
Representing South Africa
2017	World U18 Championships	Nairobi, Kenya	1st	400 m hurdles	49.27
2018	World U20 Championships	Tampere, Finland	1st	400 m hurdles	49.42
2019	African U20 Championships	Abidjan, Ivory Coast	1st	400 m hurdles	50.35
2019	Universiade	Naples, Italy	2nd	400 m hurdles	48.73
2019	Universiade	Naples, Italy	2nd	4 × 400 m relay	3:03.23
2019	African Games	Rabat, Morocco	–	400 m hurdles	DQ
2021	Olympic Games	Tokyo, Japan	15th (sf)	400 m hurdles	48.99
2022	African Championships	Saint Pierre, Mauritius	1st	400 m hurdles	49.42
2022	World Championships	Eugene, United States	20th (sf)	400 m hurdles	50.22

== Personal bests ==
Outdoor

- 400 metres – 45.86 (Paarl 2018)
- 400 metres hurdles – 48.73 (Napoli 2019)
