= 2019 World Athletics Championships – Men's 400 metres hurdles =

Men's 400 metres hurdles at the 2019 World Championships
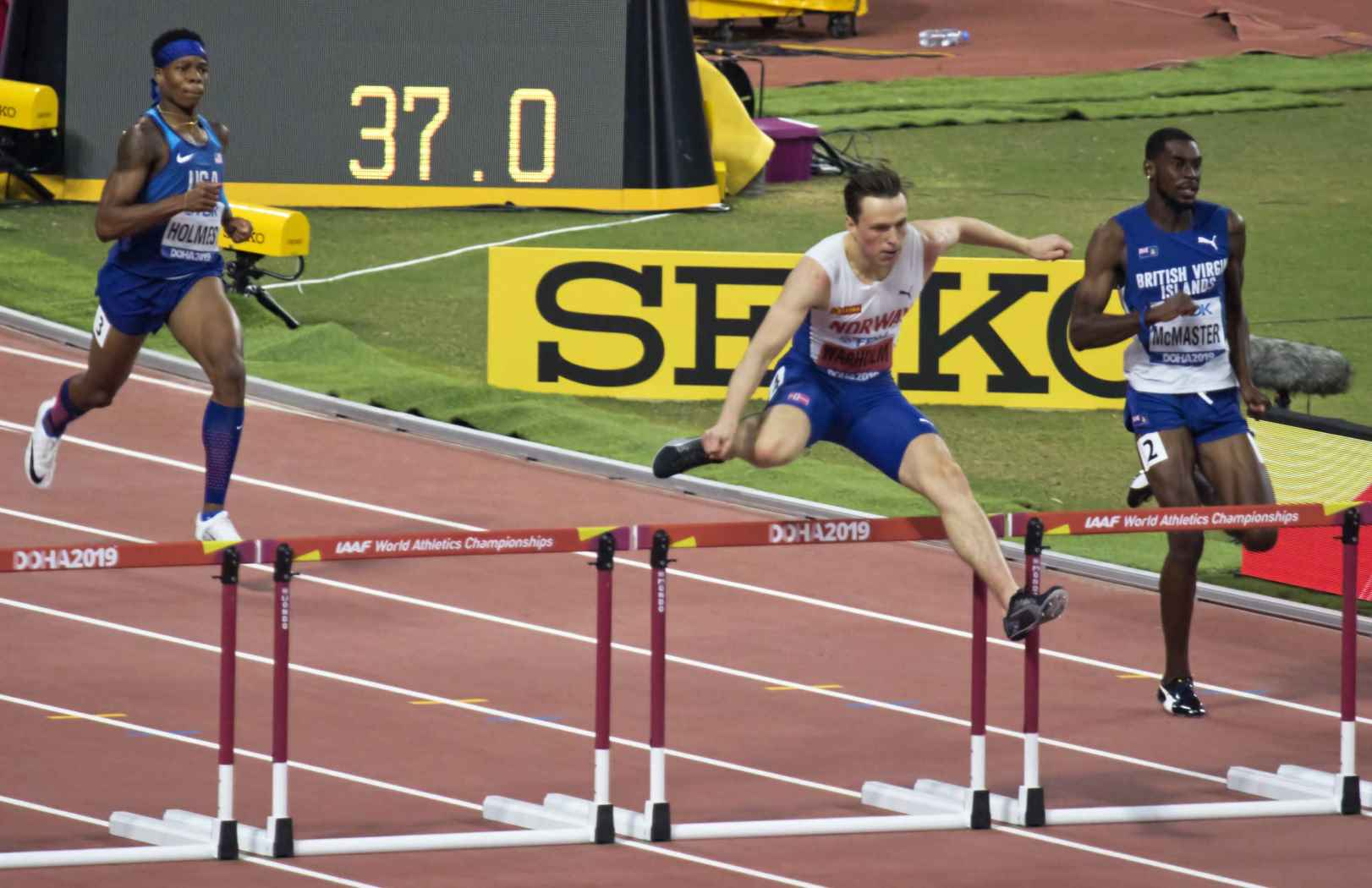
- 400mH final men
- Venue: Khalifa International Stadium
- Dates: 27 September (heats); 28 September (semi-finals); 30 September (final)
- Competitors: 39 from 31 nations
- Winning time: 47.42

Medalists
| gold medal | Karsten Warholm | Norway |
| silver medal | Rai Benjamin | United States |
| bronze medal | Abderrahman Samba | Qatar |

Video on YouTube Official Video

The men's 400 metres hurdles at the 2019 World Athletics Championships was held at the Khalifa International Stadium in Doha from 27 to 30 September 2019.

== Summary ==
Before these Championships, only four men had run under 47 seconds. World-record holder Kevin Young, now 53, never officially retired but has largely been a spectator for the past two decades. The other three achieved the feat within the past year, with two doing so this season in the same race. All three were in Doha, setting up a highly anticipated showdown.

It took 48.93 to make the final. Abdelmalik Lahoulou set the Algerian national record and Alison dos Santos a personal best to get there.

In the final, Rai Benjamin in lane 7 appeared to get a better start, making up the stagger on Lahoulou to his outside, but that may have been deceptive. Down the backstretch, defending champion Karsten Warholm started to take charge. All alone in lane 9, the third of the big 3 Abderrahman Samba, was getting passed by. Through the turn, Warholm held his advantage over Benjamin which revealed to be a full stride coming off the turn. Kyron McMaster looked to be in third place. Benjamin made a run at Warholm down the stretch but stretched for the final hurdle, landing awkwardly and losing momentum and his last opportunity to try to catch Warholm. In front of a home crowd, Samba was able to get past McMaster to take the bronze.

== Records ==
Before the competition records were as follows:

| World record | Kevin Young (USA) | 46.78 | Barcelona, Spain | 6 August 1992 |
| Championship record | Kevin Young (USA) | 47.18 | Stuttgart, Germany | 19 August 1993 |
| World leading | Karsten Warholm (NOR) | 46.92 | Zürich, Switzerland | 29 August 2019 |
| African record | Samuel Matete (ZAM) | 47.10 | Zürich, Switzerland | 7 August 1991 |
| Asian record | Abderrahman Samba (QAT) | 46.98 | Paris, France | 30 June 2018 |
| North, Central American and Caribbean record | Kevin Young (USA) | 46.78 | Barcelona, Spain | 6 August 1992 |
| South American record | Bayano Kamani (PAN) | 47.84 | Helsinki, Finland | 7 August 2005 |
| European record | Karsten Warholm (NOR) | 46.92 | Zürich, Switzerland | 29 August 2019 |
| Oceanian record | Rohan Robinson (AUS) | 48.28 | Atlanta, United States | 31 July 1996 |

== Qualification standard ==
The standard to qualify automatically for entry was 49.30.

== Schedule ==
The event schedule, in local time (UTC+3), was as follows:

| Date | Time | Round |
|---|---|---|
| 27 September | 20:35 | Heats |
| 28 September | 18:05 | Semi-finals |
| 30 September | 22:40 | Final |

== Results ==
=== Heats ===
Qualification: First 4 in each heat (Q) and the next 4 fastest (q) advanced to the semi-finals.

| Rank | Heat | Name | Nationality | Time | Notes |
|---|---|---|---|---|---|
| 1 | 3 | Abderrahman Samba | Qatar | 49.08 | Q |
| 2 | 3 | Takatoshi Abe | Japan | 49.25 | Q |
| 3 | 1 | Karsten Warholm | Norway | 49.27 | Q |
| 4 | 5 | Rasmus Mägi | Estonia | 49.34 | Q, SB |
| 5 | 1 | Thomas Barr | Ireland | 49.41 | Q |
| 6 | 5 | Ludvy Vaillant | France | 49.49 | Q |
| 7 | 3 | TJ Holmes | United States | 49.50 | Q |
| 8 | 5 | Abdelmalik Lahoulou | Algeria | 49.54 | Q |
| 9 | 2 | Kyron McMaster | British Virgin Islands | 49.60 | Q |
| 10 | 4 | Rai Benjamin | United States | 49.62 | Q |
| 11 | 1 | Jabir Madari Pillyalil | India | 49.62 | Q |
| 12 | 1 | Kemar Mowatt | Jamaica | 49.63 | Q |
| 13 | 2 | Alison dos Santos | Brazil | 49.66 | Q |
| 14 | 1 | Amere Lattin | United States | 49.72 | q |
| 15 | 5 | Chris McAlister | Great Britain & N.I. | 49.73 | Q |
| 16 | 5 | Yasmani Copello | Turkey | 49.75 | q |
| 17 | 4 | Mohamed Amine Touati | Tunisia | 49.76 | Q |
| 18 | 4 | Patryk Dobek | Poland | 49.89 | Q |
| 19 | 2 | Chen Chieh | Chinese Taipei | 49.95 | Q |
| 19 | 1 | Fernando Vega | Mexico | 49.95 | q |
| 21 | 3 | Rilwan Alowonle | Nigeria | 50.04 | Q |
| 22 | 4 | Vít Müller | Czech Republic | 50.15 | Q |
| 23 | 2 | Luke Campbell | Germany | 50.20 | Q |
| 24 | 4 | Masaki Toyoda | Japan | 50.34 | q |
| 25 | 1 | Mehdi Pirjahan | Iran | 50.46 | |
| 26 | 3 | Nick Smidt | Netherlands | 50.54 | |
| 27 | 5 | Dharun Ayyasamy | India | 50.55 | |
| 28 | 3 | Kariem Hussein | Switzerland | 50.62 | |
| 29 | 4 | Sergio Fernández | Spain | 50.71 | |
| 30 | 2 | Creve Armando Machava | Mozambique | 50.76 | |
| 31 | 5 | Constantin Preis | Germany | 50.93 | |
| 32 | 4 | Márcio Teles | Brazil | 51.02 | |
| 33 | 3 | Wilfried Happio | France | 51.25 | |
| 34 | 1 | Artur Terezan | Brazil | 51.52 | SB |
| 35 | 2 | Lindsay Hanekom | South Africa | 51.71 | |
| 36 | 2 | Ned Justeen Azemia | Seychelles | 52.58 | |
| 37 | 3 | Andrea Ercolani Volta | San Marino | 52.60 | NR |
| 38 | 5 | Malique Smith | U.S. Virgin Islands | 59.45 | |
| | 2 | Bienvenu Sawadogo | Burkina Faso | DSQ | 163.3(a) |

=== Semi-finals ===
Qualification: First 2 in each heat (Q) and the next 2 fastest (q) advanced to the Final.

| Rank | Heat | Name | Nationality | Time | Notes |
|---|---|---|---|---|---|
| 1 | 2 | Karsten Warholm | Norway | 48.28 | Q |
| 2 | 1 | Alison dos Santos | Brazil | 48.35 | Q, PB |
| 3 | 1 | Yasmani Copello | Turkey | 48.39 | Q, SB |
| 4 | 2 | Abdelmalik Lahoulou | Algeria | 48.39 | Q, NR |
| 5 | 1 | Kyron McMaster | British Virgin Islands | 48.40 | q |
| 6 | 3 | Rai Benjamin | United States | 48.52 | Q |
| 7 | 2 | TJ Holmes | United States | 48.67 | q |
| 8 | 3 | Abderrahman Samba | Qatar | 48.72 | Q |
| 9 | 1 | Rasmus Mägi | Estonia | 48.93 | SB |
| 10 | 3 | Takatoshi Abe | Japan | 48.97 | |
| 11 | 3 | Thomas Barr | Ireland | 49.02 | SB |
| 12 | 2 | Ludvy Vaillant | France | 49.10 | |
| 13 | 1 | Mohamed Amine Touati | Tunisia | 49.14 | PB |
| 14 | 2 | Chris McAlister | Great Britain & N.I. | 49.18 | PB |
| 15 | 1 | Amere Lattin | United States | 49.20 | |
| 16 | 1 | Kemar Mowatt | Jamaica | 49.32 | |
| 17 | 3 | Jabir Madari Pillyalil | India | 49.71 | |
| 18 | 3 | Fernando Vega | Mexico | 49.96 | |
| 19 | 3 | Vít Müller | Czech Republic | 49.97 | |
| 20 | 1 | Chen Chieh | Chinese Taipei | 50.00 | |
| 21 | 2 | Luke Campbell | Germany | 50.00 | |
| 22 | 2 | Patryk Dobek | Poland | 50.18 | |
| 23 | 2 | Masaki Toyoda | Japan | 50.30 | |
| 24 | 3 | Rilwan Alowonle | Nigeria | 52.01 | |

=== Final ===
The final was started on 30 September at 22:41.

| Rank | Lane | Name | Nationality | Time | Notes |
|---|---|---|---|---|---|
| 1st place, gold medalist(s) | 4 | Karsten Warholm | Norway | 47.42 | |
| 2nd place, silver medalist(s) | 7 | Rai Benjamin | United States | 47.66 | |
| 3rd place, bronze medalist(s) | 9 | Abderrahman Samba | Qatar | 48.03 | |
| 4 | 2 | Kyron McMaster | British Virgin Islands | 48.10 | SB |
| 5 | 3 | TJ Holmes | United States | 48.20 | PB |
| 6 | 6 | Yasmani Copello | Turkey | 48.25 | SB |
| 7 | 5 | Alison dos Santos | Brazil | 48.28 | PB |
| 8 | 8 | Abdelmalik Lahoulou | Algeria | 49.46 | |
