= British Virgin Islands at the 2023 World Athletics Championships =

- Flag of the British Virgin Islands
- WA code: IVB

in Budapest, Hungary 19 August 2023 – 27 August 2023
- Competitors: 3 (2 men and 1 woman) in 3 events
- Medals Ranked 27th: Gold 0 Silver 1 Bronze 0 Total 1

World Athletics Championships appearances (overview)
- 1983; 1987; 1991; 1993; 1995; 1997; 1999; 2001; 2003; 2005; 2007; 2009; 2011; 2013; 2015; 2017; 2019; 2022; 2023; 2025

The British Virgin Islands competed at the 2023 World Athletics Championships in Budapest, Hungary, from 19 to 27 August 2023.

== Medalists ==
Medal	Athlete	Event	Date
Silver	Kyron McMaster	Men's 400 metres hurdles	August 23

== Results ==
Key

- Q = Qualified for the next round
- q = Qualified for the next round as a fastest loser or, in field events, by position without achieving the qualifying target
- NR = National record
- PB = Personal best
- SB = Season best
- NM = No mark
- N/A = Round not applicable for the event

=== Men ===
Track and road events

Athlete	Event	Heat		Semifinal		Final	
Athlete	Event	Result	Rank	Result	Rank	Result	Rank
Rikkoi Brathwaite	100 metres	10.18	5	Did not advance			
Kyron McMaster	400 metres hurdles	48.47	1 Q	47.72	1 Q	47.34	2nd place, silver medalist(s)

=== Women ===
Track and road events

Athlete	Event	Heat		Semifinal		Final	
Athlete	Event	Result	Rank	Result	Rank	Result	Rank
Adeajah Hodge	200 metres	22.82	4 q	22.96	7	Did not advance	
