= British Virgin Islands at the 2013 World Championships in Athletics =

- WA code: IVB

in Moscow
- Competitors: 3
- Medals: Gold 0 Silver 0 Bronze 0 Total 0

World Championships in Athletics appearances
- 1983; 1987; 1991; 1993; 1995; 1997; 1999; 2001; 2003; 2005; 2007; 2009; 2011; 2013; 2015; 2017; 2019; 2022; 2023; 2025

The British Virgin Islands competed at the 2013 World Championships in Athletics from August 10 to August 18 in Moscow, Russia. A team of three athletes was announced to represent the territory in the event.

== Results ==
(q – qualified, NM – no mark, SB – season best)

=== Women ===
Athlete	Event	Heats		Semifinals		Final	
Athlete	Event	Time	Rank	Time	Rank	Time	Rank
Tahesia Harrigan	100 metres	11.61	31	did not advance			
Karene King	200 metres	23.97	40	did not advance			
Chantel Malone	Long jump	6.40	21	—N/a		did not advance	
