= U.S. Virgin Islands at the 2013 World Championships in Athletics =

Virgin Islands at the 2013 World Championships in Athletics
- WA code: ISV

in Moscow
- Competitors: 1
- Medals: Gold 0 Silver 0 Bronze 0 Total 0

World Championships in Athletics appearances
- 1976; 1980; 1983; 1987; 1991; 1993; 1995; 1997; 1999; 2001; 2003; 2005; 2007; 2009; 2011; 2013; 2015; 2017; 2019; 2022; 2023; 2025

The United States Virgin Islands competed at the 2013 World Championships in Athletics in Moscow, Russia, from 10–18 August 2013. Eddie Lovett was the Virgin Islands' sole athlete, competing in the 110m hurdles. Lovett was eliminated in the heats.
