= Mohamed Amine Touati =

Tunisian hurdler (born 1998)

Mohamed Touati
Personal information
- Full name: Mohamed Amine Touati
- Born: 9 September 1998 (age 27)

Sport
- Sport: Athletics
- Event: 400 metres hurdles
Medal record
Men's athletics
Representing Tunisia
African Games
Bronze medal – third place	2019 Rabat	400 m hurdles

Mohamed Amine Touati (Arabic: محمد أمين تواتي, born 9 September 1998) is a Tunisian athlete specialising in the 400 metres hurdles. He won a bronze medal at the 2019 African Games. He competed at the 2020 Summer Olympics.

His personal best in the event is 49.14 seconds set in Doha in 2019.

== International competitions ==
Year	Competition	Venue	Position	Event	Notes
Representing Tunisia
2015	World Youth Championships	Cali, Colombia	6th	400 m hurdles (84 cm)	52.73
2016	Arab Junior Championships	Tlemcen, Algeria	2nd	400 m hurdles	52.97
2016	World U20 Championships	Bydgoszcz, Poland	36th (h)	400 m hurdles	53.79
2018	Mediterranean U23 Championships	Jesolo, Italy	4th	400 m hurdles	51.40
2019	African Games	Rabat, Morocco	3rd	400 m hurdles	49.29
2019	World Championships	Doha, Qatar	13th (sf)	400 m hurdles	49.14
2021	Olympic Games	Tokyo, Japan	31st (h)	400 m hurdles	50.58
2022	African Championships	Port Louis, Mauritius	9th (h)	400 m hurdles	51.62
2022	African Championships	Port Louis, Mauritius	5th	4 × 400 m relay	3:11.31
2022	Mediterranean Games	Oran, Algeria	8th	400 m hurdles	50.13
2023	Arab Games	Oran, Algeria	6th	400 m hurdles	64.86
2023	Jeux de la Francophonie	Kinshasa, DR Congo	6th	400 m hurdles	52.42
