= Fernando Vega (footballer, born 1995) =

Argentine professional footballer

Personal information
- Full name: Fernando Ariel Vega
- Date of birth: 7 May 1995 (age 31)
- Place of birth: Argentina
- Position: Midfielder

Team information
- Current team: Ferrocarril Midland

Senior career*
Years	Team	Apps	(Gls)
2015–2019	Almirante Brown	26	(0)
2020–	Ferrocarril Midland	6	(0)
- * Club domestic league appearances and goals as of 19:07, 26 August 2020 (UTC)

Fernando Ariel Vega (born 7 May 1995) is an Argentine professional footballer who plays as a midfielder for Ferrocarril Midland.

== Career ==
Vega's career started with Almirante Brown. He featured in Primera B Metropolitana fixtures with Defensores de Belgrano and Villa San Carlos in 2015, though didn't play in the subsequent 2016 season. Vega appeared in nine matches in each of the following 2016–17 and 2017–18 campaigns. In January 2020, after zero appearances in 2019–20, Vega moved to Primera C Metropolitana with Ferrocarril Midland.

== Career statistics ==
As of 26 August 2020.

Appearances and goals by club, season and competition
Club	Season	League			Cup		League Cup		Continental		Other		Total	
Club	Season	Division	Apps	Goals	Apps	Goals	Apps	Goals	Apps	Goals	Apps	Goals	Apps	Goals
Almirante Brown	2015	Primera B Metropolitana	2	0	0	0	—		—		0	0	2	0
Almirante Brown	2016	Primera B Metropolitana	0	0	0	0	—		—		0	0	0	0
Almirante Brown	2016–17	Primera B Metropolitana	9	0	0	0	—		—		0	0	9	0
Almirante Brown	2017–18	Primera B Metropolitana	9	0	0	0	—		—		0	0	9	0
Almirante Brown	2018–19	Primera B Metropolitana	6	0	0	0	—		—		0	0	6	0
Almirante Brown	2019–20	Primera B Metropolitana	0	0	0	0	—		—		0	0	0	0
Almirante Brown	Total		26	0	0	0	—		—		0	0	26	0
Ferrocarril Midland	2019–20	Primera C Metropolitana	6	0	0	0	—		—		0	0	6	0
Career total			32	0	0	0	—		—		0	0	32	0
