= Masaki Toyoda =

Japanese hurdler

Personal information
- Born: 17 January 1998 (age 28) Kagoshima Prefecture, Japan
- Education: Hosei University
- Height: 1.80 m (5 ft 11 in)
- Weight: 72 kg (159 lb)

Sport
- Sport: Athletics
- Event: 400 metres hurdles

Masaki Toyoda (豊田 将樹, Toyoda Masaki; born 17 January 1998) is a Japanese athlete specialising in the 400 metres hurdles. He represented his country at the 2019 World Championships reaching the semifinals. Early in his career he won a bronze medal at the 2015 World Youth Championships.

His personal best in the event is 49.05 set in Fukuoka in 2019.

== International competitions ==
Year	Competition	Venue	Position	Event	Notes
Representing Japan
2015	World Youth Championships	Cali, Colombia	3rd	400 m hurdles (84 cm)	50.53
2019	Universiade	Naples, Italy	4th	400 m hurdles	49.27
2019	Universiade	Naples, Italy	4th	4 × 400 m relay	3:04.34
2019	World Championships	Doha, Qatar	23rd (sf)	400 m hurdles	50.30
