= British Virgin Islands at the 2017 World Championships in Athletics =

- Flag of the British Virgin Islands
- WA code: IVB
- National federation: British Virgin Islands Athletics Association
- Website: bvi.milesplit.com

in London, United Kingdom 4–13 August 2017
- Competitors: 3 (1 man and 2 women) in 3 events
- Medals: Gold 0 Silver 0 Bronze 0 Total 0

World Championships in Athletics appearances
- 1983; 1987; 1991; 1993; 1995; 1997; 1999; 2001; 2003; 2005; 2007; 2009; 2011; 2013; 2015; 2017; 2019; 2022; 2023; 2025

British Virgin Islands competed at the 2017 World Championships in Athletics in London, United Kingdom, 4–13 August 2017.

== Results ==
=== Men ===
Track and road events

Athlete	Event	Heat		Semifinal		Final	
Athlete	Event	Result	Rank	Result	Rank	Result	Rank
Kyron McMaster	400 metres hurdles	DQ	–	Did not advance			

=== Women ===
Track and road events

Athlete	Event	Heat		Semifinal		Final	
Athlete	Event	Result	Rank	Result	Rank	Result	Rank
Ashley Kelly	400 metres	52.70	37 Q	54.50	24	Did not advance	

Field events

Athlete	Event	Qualification		Final	
Athlete	Event	Distance	Position	Distance	Position
Chantel Malone	Long jump	6.52	7 q	6.57	7
