= Chris McAlister (hurdler) =

British hurdler

Personal information
- Nationality: British (English)
- Born: 3 December 1995 (age 30)

Sport
- Sport: Athletics
- Event: 400m hurdles
- Club: Thames Valley Harriers

Chris McAlister (born 3 December 1995) is a British athlete specialising in the 400m hurdles.

== Biography ==
McAlister represented Great Britain in the men's 400m hurdles event at the 2019 World Athletics Championships. as well as the 2019 European Team Championships in Bydgoszcz, Poland.

His personal best is 49.16 seconds, achieved in BAUHAUS-galan, Stockholm in 2021.

McAlister had podiumed three times at the British Athletics Championships in 2019, 2020 and 2022.

Outside of athletics, he works as a full-time civil servant and has been a private secretary for the Minister of Sport.
