= British Virgin Islands at the 1983 World Championships in Athletics =

- Flag of the British Virgin Islands
- WA code: IVB

in Helsinki, Finland August 7–14, 1983
- Competitors: 2 (1 man and 1 woman) in 5 events
- Medals: Gold 0 Silver 0 Bronze 0 Total 0

World Championships in Athletics appearances
- 1983; 1987; 1991; 1993; 1995; 1997; 1999; 2001; 2003; 2005; 2007; 2009; 2011; 2013; 2015; 2017; 2019; 2022; 2023; 2025

The British Virgin Islands competed at the 1983 World Championships in Athletics in Helsinki, Finland, which were held from 7 to 14 August 1983. The athlete delegation consisted of two athletes, sprinter Dean Greenaway and sprinter and long jumper Rose Phillips-King. Greenaway competed in the men's 200 metres and 400 metres, while Phillips-King competed in the women's 100 metres, 200 metres, and long jump. Neither of them advanced from the preliminaries of their entered events.

== Background ==
The 1983 World Championships in Athletics were held at the Helsinki Olympic Stadium in Helsinki, Finland. Under the auspices of the International Amateur Athletics Federation, this was the first edition of the World Championships. It was held from 7 to 14 August 1983 and had 41 different events. Among the competing nations was the British Virgin Islands. For this edition of the World Championships in Athletics, sprinter Dean Greenaway and sprinter and long jumper Rose Phillips-King competed for the nation.

== Results ==
=== Men ===
Greenaway first competed in the third qualifying heat of the men's 400 metres on 7 August against five other athletes. There, he recorded a time of 48.26 seconds and placed last in the heat, failing to advance further. He then competed in the fifth qualifying heat of the men's 200 metres on 12 August against three other athletes. There, he recorded a time of 22.24 seconds and again placed last in his heat, failing to advance further.

Track and road events

| Athlete | Event | Heat | | Quarterfinal | | Semifinal | | Final | |
| Athlete | Event | Result | Rank | Result | Rank | Result | Rank | Result | Rank |
|---|---|---|---|---|---|---|---|---|---|
| Dean Greenaway | 200 metres | 22.24 | 6 | Did not advance | | | | | |
| Dean Greenaway | 400 metres | 48.26 | 4 | Did not advance | | | | | |

=== Women ===
Phillips-King first competed in the first qualifying heat of the women's 100 metres on 7 August against six other athletes. There, she recorded a time of 12.87 seconds and placed last, failing to advance further. She then competed in the second qualifying heat of the women's 200 metres held on 12 August against six other athletes. There, she recorded a time of 28.50 seconds and placed sixth, again failing to advance further. Her final event was the women's long jump, where she competed in the qualification round in Group B on 13 August. She recorded her largest distance of 5.40 metres and placed 11th in her qualification group, failing to advance to the finals.

Track and road events

| Athlete | Event | Heat | | Quarterfinal | | Semifinal | | Final | |
| Athlete | Event | Result | Rank | Result | Rank | Result | Rank | Result | Rank |
|---|---|---|---|---|---|---|---|---|---|
| Rose Phillips-King | 100 metres | 12.87 | 42 | Did not advance | | | | | |
| Rose Phillips-King | 200 metres | 28.50 | 40 | Did not advance | | | | | |

Field events

| Athlete | Event | Qualification | | Final | |
| Athlete | Event | Distance | Position | Distance | Position |
|---|---|---|---|---|---|
| Rose Phillips-King | Long jump | 5.40 | 23 | Did not advance | |
