= British Virgin Islands at the 2009 World Championships in Athletics =

- WA code: IVB

in Berlin
- Competitors: 1
- Medals: Gold 0 Silver 0 Bronze 0 Total 0

World Championships in Athletics appearances
- 1983; 1987; 1991; 1993; 1995; 1997; 1999; 2001; 2003; 2005; 2007; 2009; 2011; 2013; 2015; 2017; 2019; 2022; 2023; 2025

The British Virgin Islands competed at the 2009 World Championships in Athletics in Berlin, Germany, which were held from 15 to 23 August 2009. The athlete delegation consisted of one competitor, sprinter Tahesia Harrigan. Harrigan competed in the women's 100 metres, competing until the semifinals where she was eliminated.

== Background ==
The 2009 World Championships in Athletics were held at the Olympiastadion in Berlin, Germany. Under the auspices of the International Amateur Athletic Federation, this was the twelfth edition of the World Championships. It was held from 15 to 23 August 2009 and had 47 different events. Among the competing teams was the British Virgin Islands. For this edition of the World Championships in Athletics, Tahesia Harrigan competed for the nation in the women's 100 metres.

== Results ==
She first competed in the qualifying heats of the women's 100 metres on 16 August 2009 in the seventh heat against six other competitors. There, she recorded a time of 11.39 seconds and placed second, advancing further to the quarterfinals held the same day. She was then entered in the second round of the quarterfinals against seven other competitors. There, she recorded a time of 11.21 seconds and placed third, advancing further to the semifinals as she was in the top three of her heat. Finally, she competed in the first semifinal held the next day against seven other competitors. There, she recorded a time of 11.34 seconds and placed seventh, failing to advance further as only the top four athletes of each heat would be able to.

Event	Athletes	Heats		Quarterfinals		Semifinals		Final	
Event	Athletes	Result	Rank	Result	Rank	Result	Rank	Result	Rank
100 metres	Tahesia Harrigan	11.39	2 Q	11.21	3 Q	11.34	7	did not advance	
