= Henry Klein (athlete) =

American racewalker

Personal information
- Nickname: Hank
- Nationality: American Virgin Islander
- Born: September 17, 1952 (age 73)
- Height: 1.75 m (5 ft 9 in)
- Weight: 59 kg (130 lb)

Sport
- Sport: Athletics
- Event: Racewalking

Henry "Hank" Klein (born September 17, 1952) a racewalker who represents the United States Virgin Islands. He competed in the men's 20 kilometres walk at the 1976 Summer Olympics. He also competed in the 50K race walk at the 1976 World Championships in Athletics. The first ever World Championships in Athletics was necessitated by the International Olympic Committee eliminating the 50 kilometers race walk from the Olympic program in 1976.

As Hank Klein, he has continued as an active race walker in Masters athletics competitions.

== Personal bests ==
- 20 kilometres walk – 1:43:58 (1976)
