= Wallace Williams (runner) =

American long-distance runner

Personal information
- Nationality: American Virgin Islander
- Born: October 23, 1946 (age 79)

Sport
- Sport: Long-distance running
- Event: Marathon

Wallace Williams (born October 23, 1946) is a long-distance runner who represents the United States Virgin Islands. He competed in the men's marathon at the 1988 Summer Olympics.

== Career ==
He started training for marathons in 1977 and represented the Virgin Islands in races such as the Boston Marathon, New York City Marathon, Chicago Marathon, and World Cross Country Championships. He also competed in the men's marathon at the 1988 Summer Olympics finishing 81st in the rank.

In 1978, he founded the Virgin Islands Pace Runners and began organizing road races ranging from one-mile sprints to marathons. Over the years, Williams has organized approximately 20 races annually, becoming a prominent figure in the local running community. He is also known for starting the Women Race for The Women's Coalition in 1985, which has grown from 100 participants in its first race to nearly 500 participants in recent years.

Apart from running, Williams has also served as librarian. He retired from the V.I. library system after 30 years of service but considered books more than just a job. Prior to retiring in 2007, Williams served as Department of Planning and Natural Resources director of Libraries, Archives and Museums for the Virgin Islands.

In 2020, A Resolution of the Legislature of the Virgin Islands (Bill #33-0247) was passed for honoring Williams for his career.
