= Eduardo Garcia (runner) =

American and Virgin Islander runner

Personal information
- Full name: Eduardo Terrance Garcia
- Nickname: Eddie Garcia
- National team: Virgin Islands
- Born: November 20, 1992 (age 33) Jacksonville, Florida, U.S.
- Education: Mandarin High School; University of Florida

Sport
- Sport: Running

Eduardo Terrance Garcia (born November 20, 1992) is an American and Virgin Islander runner.

== Biography ==
Garcia was born in Jacksonville, Florida, with dual eligibility to represent the US and the Virgin Islands. He attended Mandarin High School, then studied at the University of Florida, majoring in Sports Management and graduating in 2016.

During his time at Florida University, Garcia represented the Florida Gators in competition. He competed in both track running and cross-country running. In 2015, he was the 10,000m SEC Outdoor Champion.

After graduating from Florida University, Garcia began competing for the Virgin Islands due to his dual citizenship, relocating to South Carolina to start running for the Greenville Track Club elite program. By 2018 he had transitioned to road racing, running half-marathons and marathons with the goal of competing in the 2020 Summer Olympics; he broke the Virgin Islands national half-marathon record with a time of 1:05.37 while running the Richmond Half-Marathon in November of that year.

In January 2019, Garcia ran the Houston Marathon with a time of 2:18:50, beating the Olympics qualifying time of 2:19:00. This was the fastest marathon ever ran by a Virgin Islander.

Garcia holds multiple Virgin Islands national records, including a time of 29:18.25 in the 10,000m event set at the Portland Track Festival in May 2021.

Garcia competed in the marathon at the 2024 Summer Olympics, but did not finish the race.
