= Fernando Vega (athlete) =

Mexican hurdler

Personal information
- Full name: Fernando Arodi Vega Félix
- Born: 19 February 1998 (age 28) Culiacán
- Education: Monterrey Institute of Technology and Higher Education

Sport
- Sport: Athletics
- Event: 400 metres hurdles
- Coached by: Gabriel Enrique Germán

Fernando Arodi Vega Félix (born 19 February 1998) is a Mexican athlete specialising in the 400 metres hurdles. He represented his country at the 2019 World Championships reaching the semifinals.

His personal best in the event is 49.32 seconds set in Naples in 2019. This is the current national record.

== International competitions ==
Year	Competition	Venue	Position	Event	Notes
Representing Mexico
2014	Central American and Caribbean; Junior Championships (U18)	Morelia, Mexico	7th	400 m hurdles (84 cm)	55.72
2015	World Youth Championships	Cali, Colombia	32nd (h)	400 m hurdles (84 cm)	54.27
2017	Pan American U20 Championships	Trujillo, Peru	2nd	400 m hurdles	49.96
2018	Central American and Caribbean Games	Barranquilla, Colombia	5th	400 m hurdles	49.85
2019	Universiade	Naples, Italy	5th	400 m hurdles	49.32
2019	Universiade	Naples, Italy	1st	4 × 400 m relay	3:02.89
2019	World Championships	Doha, Qatar	18th (sf)	400 m hurdles	49.96
