= Virgin Islands Track & Field Federation =

- Sport: Athletics
- Jurisdiction: Association
- Abbreviation: VITFF
- Founded: 1963
- Affiliation: IAAF
- Affiliation date: 1966
- Regional affiliation: NACAC
- Headquarters: Christiansted, St. Croix
- President: Ronald Russell
- Secretary: Wallace Williams

Official website
- vitrackandfield.com
- (United States Virgin Islands)

The Virgin Islands Track & Field Federation (VITFF) is the governing body for the sport of athletics in the United States Virgin Islands. Current president is Ronald Russell.

== History ==
VITFF was founded in 1963 and was affiliated to the IAAF in 1966.

== Affiliations ==
VITFF is the national member federation for the United States Virgin Islands in the following international organisations:

- International Association of Athletics Federations (IAAF)
- North American, Central American and Caribbean Athletic Association (NACAC)
- Association of Panamerican Athletics (APA)
- Central American and Caribbean Athletic Confederation (CACAC)
- Leeward Islands Athletics Association (LIAA)

Moreover, it is part of the following national organisations:

- Virgin Islands Olympic Committee (VIOC)

== National records ==
VITFF maintains the United States Virgin Islands records in track and field.
