= Tabarie Henry =

United States Virgin Islands sprinter (born 1987)

Personal information
- Born: 1 December 1987 (age 38) Saint Thomas, U.S. Virgin Islands
- Height: 1.85 m (6 ft 1 in)
- Weight: 77 kg (170 lb)

Sport
- Country: United States Virgin Islands
- Sport: Athletics
- Event: 400 metres

Tabarie Joil Henry (born 1 December 1987) is a United States Virgin Islands sprinter who specializes in the 400 metres. His personal best time is 20.71 seconds in the 200 metres and 44.77 in the 400 metres, achieved in April 2009 in Arkansas City, Kansas, and in May 2009 in Hutchinson, Kansas respectively. He is affiliated with Barton County Community College and Texas A&M University, where he was a national champion in 2010 and 2011.

He competed in the 400 metres event at the 2008 Olympic Games, but did not reach the final round. He did however achieve a personal best time of 45.19 seconds. He also competed in the 2009 World Championships in Berlin, Germany, where he placed 4th in the finals, and 2011 World Championships in Daegu, South Korea, where he placed 7th. In 2012 he took part in the men's 400 metres at the 2012 Olympic Games in London, where he placed 6th in the first heat of the semi-finals.

== Achievements ==
Year	Competition	Venue	Position	Event	Notes
Representing United States Virgin Islands
2008	Central American and Caribbean Championships	Cali, Colombia	17th (h)	200 m	21.20
2008	Central American and Caribbean Championships	Cali, Colombia	8th	400 m	DNF
2008	NACAC U-23 Championships	Toluca, Mexico	10th (h)	200m	21.52 (wind: -1.4 m/s) A
2008	NACAC U-23 Championships	Toluca, Mexico	2nd	400m	45.37 A
2008	Olympic Games	Beijing, China	17th (sf)	400 m	45.19
2009	Central American and Caribbean Championships	Havana, Cuba	8th (h)	200 m	21.07
2009	Central American and Caribbean Championships	Havana, Cuba	6th	4 × 100 m relay	39.89
2009	Central American and Caribbean Championships	Havana, Cuba	7th	4 × 400 m relay	3:07.05
2009	World Championships	Berlin, Germany	4th	400 m	45.42
2010	Central American and Caribbean Games	Mayagüez, Puerto Rico	2nd	400 m	45.07
2011	World Championships	Daegu, South Korea	7th	400 m	45.55
2012	World Indoor Championships	Istanbul, Turkey	4th	400 m	45.96
2012	Olympic Games	London, United Kingdom	13th (sf)	400 m	45.19
2014	World Indoor Championships	Sopot, Poland	16th (h)	400 m	46.87

Hall of Fame
Year	
2019 Inaugural Class	US Virgin Islands Olympic Hall of Fame
