= Turkey at the 2026 European Athletics Championships =

- Flag of Turkey
- WA code: TUR

in Birmingham, United Kingdom 10–16 August 2026
- Competitors: 50 (31 men and 19 women)
- Medals: Gold 0 Silver 0 Bronze 1 Total 1

European Athletics Championships appearances (overview)
- 1950; 1954; 1958; 1962; 1966; 1969; 1971; 1974; 1978; 1982; 1986; 1990; 1994; 1998; 2002; 2006; 2010; 2012; 2014; 2016; 2018; 2022; 2024; 2026

Turkey competed at the 2026 European Athletics Championships in Birmingham, United Kingdom from 10–16 August 2026.

== Medallists ==
Medal	Name	Event	Date
Bronze	İsmail Nezir	Men's 400 metres hurdles	14 August

== Results ==
Turkey entered the following athletes.

Key

- Q = Qualified for the next round
- q = Qualified for the next round as a fastest loser or, in field events, by position without achieving the qualifying target
- NR = National record
- PB = Personal best
- SB = Season best
- N/A = Round not applicable for the event

=== Men ===
Track and road events

Athlete	Event	Heat		Semifinal		Final	
Athlete	Event	Result	Rank	Result	Rank	Result	Rank
Kayhan Özer	100 m	10.51	7 q	DNS		Did not advance	
Ertan Özkan	100 m	10.73	21	Did not advance			
Kubilay Ençü	200 m	21.06	16	Did not advance			
Deniz Kaan Kartal	200 m	21.02	13 q	20.84	7	Did not advance	
Oğuz Uyar	200 m	—N/a		20.62	5	Did not advance	
Kubilay Ençü	400 m	46.13	14	Did not advance			
Ömer Faruk Bozdağ	800 m	1:48.41	6	Did not advance			
Salih Teksöz	1500 m	3:42.99	11	—N/a		Did not advance	
Kaan Kigen Özbilen	Marathon	—N/a					
Mikdat Sevler	110 m hurdles	DQ		Did not advance			
Berke Akçam	400 m hurdles	49.18 SB	4 q	48.56	10	Did not advance	
İsmail Nezir	400 m hurdles	Bye		48.16	4 q	48.26	3rd place, bronze medalist(s)
Cuma Özcan	3000 m steeplechase	8:59.34	15	—N/a		Did not advance	
Abdullah Tuğluk	3000 m steeplechase	8:43.77	10	—N/a		Did not advance	
Mazlum Demir	Half marathon walk	—N/a				DNF	
Salih Korkmaz	Half marathon walk	—N/a				1:24:45	5
Hayrettin Yıldız	Half marathon walk	—N/a				1:32:14	21
Ozan Bayram	Marathon walk	—N/a				3:21:39	25
Harun Bilir	Marathon walk	—N/a				DNF	
Batuhan Altıntaş; Emre Ergün; Deniz Kaan Kartal; Kayhan Özer; Ertan Özkan; Mikdat Sevler; Oğuz Uyar	4 × 100 m relay			—N/a			
İhsan Selçuk; Kubilay Ençü; Oğuzhan Kaya; Berke Akçam	4 × 400 m relay	3:02.96 SB	6	—N/a		Did not advance	

Field events

Athlete	Event	Qualification		Final	
Athlete	Event	Distance	Position	Distance	Position
Ersu Şaşma	Pole vault	NM		Did not advance	
Mesut Bülbül	Triple jump	16.08	11 q		
Necati Er	Triple jump	16.45	6 q		
Can Özüpek	Triple jump	16.30	8 q		
Ali Peker	Shot put	18.53	24	Did not advance	
Ömer Şahin	Discus throw	57.74	21	Did not advance	
Özkan Baltacı	Hammer throw	68.90	28	Did not advance	
Halil Yılmazer	Hammer throw	69.53	27	Did not advance	

=== Women ===
Track and road events

Athlete	Event	Heat		Semifinal		Final	
Athlete	Event	Result	Rank	Result	Rank	Result	Rank
Sıla Koloğlu	200 m	23.65	7	Did not advance			
Elif Polat	200 m	23.43	5	Did not advance			
Şilan Ayyıldız	1500 m	4:11.33	19	—N/a		Did not advance	
Sümeyye Erol	3000 m steeplechase	10:05.71	16	—N/a		Did not advance	
Derya Kunur	3000 m steeplechase	9:54.68	13	—N/a		Did not advance	
Tuğba Güvenç Yenigün	3000 m steeplechase	9:33.27	7 Q	—N/a		9:59.15	16
Meryem Bekmez	Half marathon walk	—N/a					
Emine Ceylan	Half marathon walk	—N/a					
Kader Dost	Half marathon walk	—N/a					
Ayşe Aslan	Marathon walk	—N/a					
Kader Güvenç	Marathon walk	—N/a					
Esma Öztekin	Marathon walk	—N/a					

Field events

Athlete	Event	Qualification		Final	
Athlete	Event	Distance	Position	Distance	Position
Berra Aygün	High jump	1.80	28	Did not advance	
Yasemin Zehra Börekçi	Long jump				
Tuğba Danışmaz	Triple jump	14.23 SB	5 Q	14.33	5
Kadriye Dilek Durmuş	Triple jump	NM		Did not advance	
Özlem Becerek	Discus throw	58.48	12 q	57.27	11
Eda Tuğsuz	Javelin throw	51.29	28	Did not advance	
Esra Türkmen	Javelin throw	60.43	4 q		
