= 2023 European Athletics Indoor Championships =

- Organisers: EAA
- Edition: 37th
- Dates: 2–5 March
- Host city: Istanbul, Turkey
- Venue: Ataköy Arena
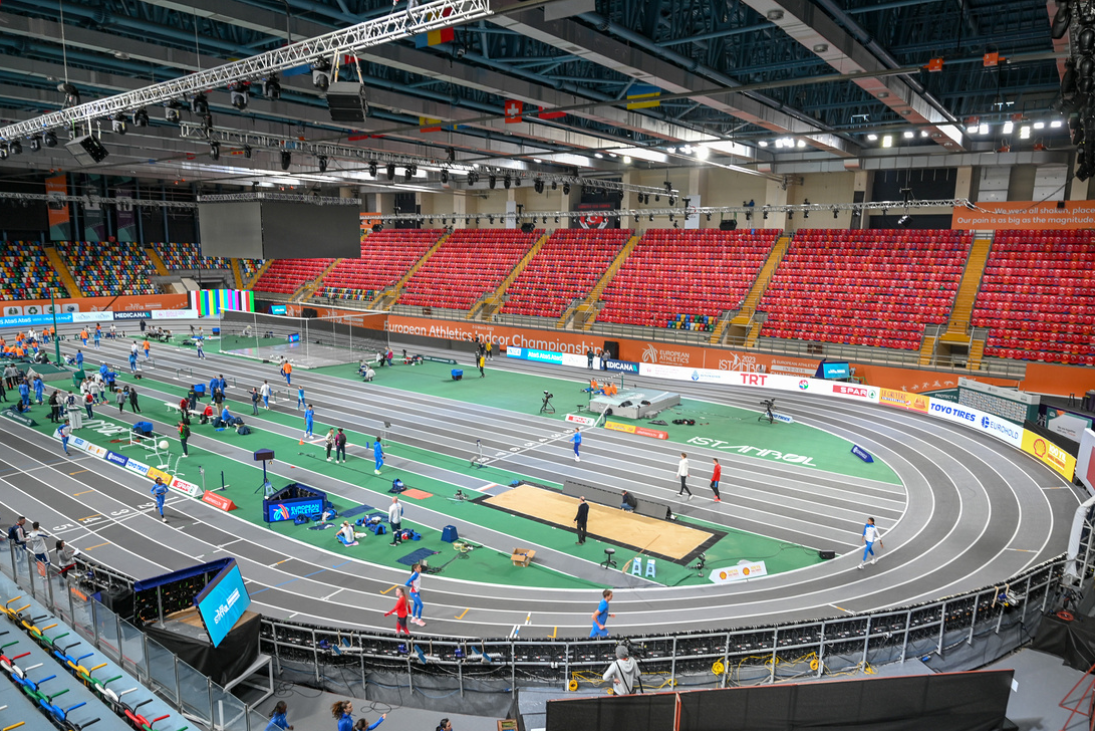
- Level: Senior
- Type: Indoor
- Events: 26
- Participation: 550 athletes from 47 nations
- Official website: EAA; LOC

The 2023 European Athletics Indoor Championships was held from 2 to 5 March 2023 at the Ataköy Arena in Istanbul, Turkey, the first time the event took place in this country although the venue did stage the 2012 World Indoor Championships for which this 7000-seater was specifically built. The four-day competition was held during the centenary year of the Republic of Turkey, and featured 13 men's and 13 women's athletics events over three morning and four afternoon sessions.

On 11 November 2020, the European Athletic Association (EAA) chose Istanbul at its 160th Council Meeting held online due to the COVID-19 pandemic. The city was the only candidate that applied for the organization of this championships.

In a statement issued on 21 February 2023, European Athletics announced that the championships would take place as planned despite the Turkey–Syria earthquake, which struck southern and central Turkey on 6 February and affected 16 percent of country's population with more than 45,900 deaths, albeit with limitations on usual celebratory side-events and activities as well as no local promotion. Turkish Athletic Federation announced that all proceeds from ticket sales in the championship would be donated to the victims of the earthquake.

While 550 athletes from 47 European Athletics Member Federations competed in Ataköy Arena, it was the first time ever at a major European athletics championship that the number of female athletes competing (278) exceeded the number of male athletes (274). Norway topped the medal table for the first time in European Athletics Indoor Championships history with four gold and one silver medal. The Netherlands and Great Britain and Northern Ireland earned three gold medals each, while Italy, Belgium, Portugal, Switzerland and Finland secured two gold medals respectively. In the placing table, Italy came first with 84 points, while Norway placed ninth with 45 points.

== Schedule ==
All times are local (UTC+3).

Q	Qualification	H	Heats	R1	Round 1	S	Semi-finals	F	Final
M = morning session, E = evening session

Men
Date →	2 Mar	3 Mar		4 Mar			5 Mar	
Event ↓	E	M	E	M	E		M	E
60 m				H	S	F		
400 m		H	S		F			
800 m	H						S	F
1500 m	R1		F					
3000 m				R1				F
60 m hurdles				H			S	F
4 × 400 m								F
High jump			Q					F
Pole vault				Q				F
Long jump		Q					F	
Triple jump	Q		F					
Shot put	Q		F					
Heptathlon				F				

Women
Date →	2 Mar	3 Mar			4 Mar		5 Mar	
Event ↓	E	M	E		M	E	M	E
60 m		H	S	F				
400 m		H	S			F		
800 m	H					S		F
1500 m		R1				F		
3000 m	R1		F					
60 m hurdles					H		S	F
4 × 400 m								F
High jump	Q						F	
Pole vault		Q				F		
Long jump					Q			F
Triple jump		Q				F		
Shot put	Q		F					
Pentathlon		F						

Event detailed schedule
Day 1 — Thursday, 2 March 2023
Time	Event	Gender	Round
19:00	800 metres	M	Heats
19:05	High Jump	W	Qualification
19:12	Shot Put	M	Qualification
19:40	800 metres	W	Heats
19:53	Triple Jump	M	Qualification
20:30	3000 metres	W	Heats
20:40	Shot Put	W	Qualification
21:05	1500 metres	M	Heats
Day 2 — Friday, 3 March 2023
Time	Event	Gender	Round
09:00	60 metres hurdles	W	Pentathlon
09:10	Long Jump	M	Qualification
09:15	Pole Vault	W	Qualification
09:45	High Jump	W	Pentathlon
09:50	400 metres	M	Heats
10:40	400 metres	W	Heats
11:10	Triple Jump	W	Qualification
11:30	1500 metres	W	Heats
12:05	60 metres	W	Heats
12:30	Shot Put	W	Pentathlon
19:00	High Jump	M	Qualification
19:05	60 metres	W	Semifinals
19:10	Long Jump	W	Pentathlon
19:25	Shot Put	M	Final
19:35	400 metres	M	Semifinals
19:55	400 metres	W	Semifinals
20:18	3000 metres	W	Final
20:35	Triple Jump	M	Final
20:40	1500 metres	M	Final
20:53	Shot Put	W	Final
21:05	800 metres	W	Pentathlon Final
21:45	60 metres	W	Final
Day 3 — Saturday, 4 March 2023
Time	Event	Gender	Round
09:00	60 metres	M	Heptathlon
09:04	Pole Vault	M	Qualification
09:20	60 metres	M	Heats
09:40	Long Jump	M	Heptathlon
10:00	3000 metres	M	Heats
10:35	60 metres hurdles	W	Heats
11:05	Shot Put	M	Heptathlon
11:10	Long Jump	W	Qualification
11:20	60 metres hurdles	M	Heats
18:35	High Jump	M	Heptathlon
18:45	60 metres	M	Semifinals
19:05	Pole Vault	W	Final
19:15	800 metres	W	Semifinals
19:35	800 metres	M	Semifinals
19:50	Triple Jump	W	Final
20:00	1500 metres	W	Final
20:20	400 metres	M	Final
20:30	400 metres	W	Final
20:55	60 metres	M	Final
Day 4 — Sunday, 5 March 2023
Time	Event	Gender	Round
10:00	60 metres hurdles	M	Heptathlon
10:12	Long Jump	M	Final
10:20	High Jump	W	Final
10:35	60 metres hurdles	M	Semifinals
10:55	60 metres hurdles	W	Semifinals
11:08	Pole Vault	M	Heptathlon
19:05	High Jump	M	Final
19:10	4 × 400 metres	M	Final
19:18	Pole Vault	M	Final
19:25	4 × 400 metres	W	Final
19:40	1000 metres	M	Heptathlon Final
19:50	Long Jump	W	Final
20:00	3000 metres	M	Final
20:22	800 metres	M	Final
20:35	800 metres	W	Final
20:55	60 metres hurdles	W	Final
21:05	60 metres hurdles	M	Final

== Qualification criteria ==
In individual events athletes could qualify by achieving the Entry Standard within the qualification period or by virtue of the World Athletics Rankings' position achieved at the end of the qualification period. About 50 percent of the athletes should have qualified via the Entry Standards, while the remaining participants were determined via the World Rankings. The qualification period ran 12 months from 20 February 2022 to 19 February 2023, except for the combined events where it ran 18 months from 20 August 2021 to 19 February 2023. Each nation could enter up to four qualified athletes in each individual event of whom up to three could participate. Countries who had no athletes who had achieved the Entry Standard and athletes who had been potentially qualified by World Rankings, could enter one unqualified male athlete and/or one unqualified female athlete in one individual event of the championships. Six national teams could take part in each 4 × 400 m relay event: one place was allocated to the team of the host nation, three places were allocated to best official teams in 4 × 400 m outdoor lists for 2022, while the remaining two places (or three if the host country did not take its allocated place as the Turkish women's relay) were allocated to teams with best accumulated 400 m times of individual athletes from 2023 indoor season as of 20 February 2023.

All athletes born before and including 2007 (aged at least 16 years on 31 December 2023) were eligible to compete, except for the men's shot put where the limit was 2005 (athletes aged at least 18 years on 31 December 2023).

Entry Standards and target numbers of athletes / teams per event
Event	Men		Women		Quota
Event	Indoor	Outdoor	Indoor	Outdoor	Quota
60 metres	6.63	10.08 for 100 m	7.24	11.10 for 100 m	40
400 metres	46.35	45.15	52.20	50.80	30
800 metres	1:46.75	1:44.70	2:02.20	1:59.00	30
1500 metres	3:37.40	3:32.80	4:09.00	4:02.50	27
3000 metres	7:44.00	7:37.00	8:48.00	8:39.00	24
60 m hurdles	7.64	13.30 for 110 mH	8.03	12.90 for 100 mH	32
High jump	2.30 m (7 ft 6 1/2 in)		1.96 m (6 ft 5 in)		18
Pole vault	5.82 m (19 ft 1 in)		4.70 m (15 ft 5 in)		18
Long jump	8.12 m (26 ft 7 1/2 in)		6.75 m (22 ft 1 1/2 in)		18
Triple jump	17.02 m (55 ft 10 in)		14.32 m (46 ft 11 3/4 in)		18
Shot put	21.20 m (69 ft 6 1/2 in)		18.60 m (61 ft 1/4 in)		18
Pentathlon	—N/a		4580 pts	6650 for heptathlon	14
Heptathlon	6140 pts	8400 for decathlon	—N/a		14
4 × 400 m relay	see above				6

== Highlights ==
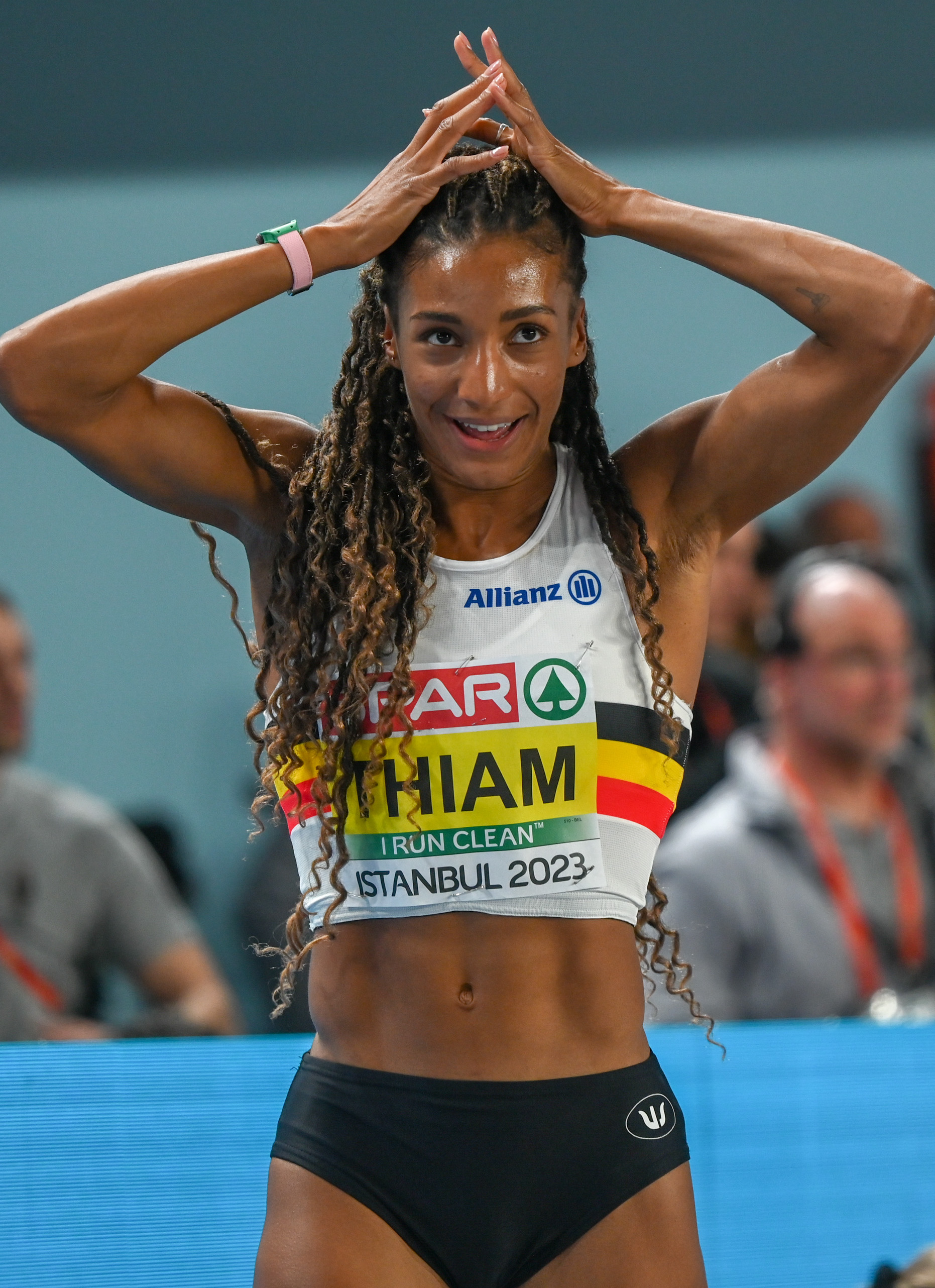
Nafissatou Thiam broke the pentathlon world record

On 3 March, Belgium's Nafissatou Thiam broke the pentathlon world record of 5013 points set by Nataliya Dobrynska of Ukraine during the 2012 World Indoor Championships at the same Ataköy Arena, totalling a score of 5055 points. It was the first world record at the European Indoor Championships since 2011, making Thiam the first ever Belgian woman to set an official athletics world record (indoor or outdoor). In addition, with her third European indoor title, she became the most successful female pentathlete in history of this championships, retaining also her gold medal from the 2021 edition. Poland's Adrianna Sułek also went above previous record with a score of 5014 points and basically was the world record-holder for about six seconds, finishing first the 800 metres run, the final of the five events in pentathlon.

Two additional championship records were broken: Norway's Jakob Ingebrigtsen ran a time 3:33.95 in the 1500 metres and Dutch women's 4 × 400 m relay team achieved a mark of 3:25.66, making them the third-fastest national team in history. One men's heptathlon and one women's pentathlon championship best as well as 39 national indoor records were set. There were four world-leading marks and eight European-leading marks.

Ingebrigtsen completed the 1500 m/3000 m 'double-double', successfully defending both his titles from 2021 to increase his overall tally to six medals, including five golds. Greece's Miltiadis Tentoglou became the first man to win three consecutive long jump titles. Portugal's Pedro Pichardo in the triple jump and France's Kevin Mayer in the heptathlon also retained their titles.

On the women's side, Netherlands' Femke Bol secured the 400 m/4 × 400 m golden double as in previous edition. Great Britain's Keely Hodgkinson in the 800 metres, Ukraine's Yaroslava Mahuchikh in the high jump and Portugal's Auriol Dongmo in the shot put also retained their titles. Laura Muir won a British record fifth title, taking victory in the 1500 m, after her historic 1500 m/3000 m 'double-double' from 2017 and 2019. Finland's Reetta Hurske claimed gold in the 60 metres hurdles, the first ever medal for her nation in the event.

== Men's results ==
=== Track ===
Chronology: 2019 | 2021 | 2023 | 2025 | 2027

Event	Gold		Silver		Bronze	
60 metres	Samuele Ceccarelli; Italy	6.48	Marcell Jacobs; Italy	6.50 SB	Henrik Larsson; Sweden	6.53 NR
400 metres	Karsten Warholm; Norway	45.35	Julien Watrin; Belgium	45.44 NR	Carl Bengtström; Sweden	45.77
800 metres	Adrián Ben; Spain	1:47.34 (.335)	Benjamin Robert; France	1:47.34 (.338)	Eliott Crestan; Belgium	1:47.65
1500 metres	Jakob Ingebrigtsen; Norway	3:33.95 CR	Neil Gourley; Great Britain	3:34.23	Azeddine Habz; France	3:35.39
3000 metres	Jakob Ingebrigtsen; Norway	7:40.32 NR	Adel Mechaal; Spain	7:41.75 SB	Elzan Bibić; Serbia	7:44.03
60 metres hurdles	Jason Joseph; Switzerland	7.41 EL	Jakub Szymański; Poland	7.56	Just Kwaou-Mathey; France	7.59
4 × 400 metres relay	Belgium; Dylan Borlée; Alexander Doom; Kevin Borlée; Julien Watrin	3:05.83 EL	France; Gilles Biron; Téo Andant; Victor Coroller; Muhammad Abdallah Kounta	3:06.52 SB	Netherlands; Isayah Boers; Isaya Klein Ikkink; Ramsey Angela; Liemarvin Bonevacia	3:06.59 SB

=== Field ===
Chronology: 2019 | 2021 | 2023 | 2025 | 2027

Event	Gold		Silver		Bronze	
High jump	Douwe Amels; Netherlands	2.31 =NR	Andriy Protsenko; Ukraine	2.29	Thomas Carmoy; Belgium	2.29 PB
Pole vault	Sondre Guttormsen; Norway	5.80	Emmanouil Karalis; Greece Piotr Lisek; Poland SB	5.80	Not awarded	
Long jump	Miltiadis Tentoglou; Greece	8.30	Thobias Montler; Sweden	8.19 SB	Gabriel Bitan; Romania	8.00
Triple jump	Pedro Pichardo; Portugal	17.60 WL NR	Nikolaos Andrikopoulos; Greece	16.58 SB	Max Heß; Germany	16.57
Shot put	Zane Weir; Italy	22.06 EL NR	Tomáš Staněk; Czech Republic	21.90 SB	Roman Kokoshko; Ukraine	21.84 NR

=== Combined ===
Chronology: 2019 | 2021 | 2023 | 2025 | 2027

Event	Gold		Silver		Bronze	
Heptathlon	Kevin Mayer; France	6,348 EL	Sander Skotheim; Norway	6,318 NR	Risto Lillemets; Estonia	6,079 SB

== Women's results ==
=== Track ===
Chronology: 2019 | 2021 | 2023 | 2025 | 2027

Event	Gold		Silver		Bronze	
60 metres	Mujinga Kambundji; Switzerland	7.00 CR	Ewa Swoboda; Poland	7.09 =SB	Daryll Neita; Great Britain	7.12
400 metres	Femke Bol; Netherlands	49.85	Lieke Klaver; Netherlands	50.57	Anna Kiełbasińska; Poland	51.25 SB
800 metres	Keely Hodgkinson; Great Britain	1:58.66	Anita Horvat; Slovenia	2:00.54	Agnès Raharolahy; France	2:00.85
1500 metres	Laura Muir; Great Britain	4:03.40	Claudia Bobocea; Romania	4:03.76 PB	Sofia Ennaoui; Poland	4:04.06 PB
3000 metres	Hanna Klein; Germany	8:35.87 PB	Konstanze Klosterhalfen; Germany	8:36.50	Melissa Courtney-Bryant; Great Britain	8:41.19
60 metres hurdles	Reetta Hurske; Finland	7.79 =NR	Nadine Visser; Netherlands	7.84 SB	Ditaji Kambundji; Switzerland	7.91
4 × 400 metres relay	Netherlands; Lieke Klaver; Eveline Saalberg; Cathelijn Peeters; Femke Bol	3:25.66 WL CR NR	Italy; Alice Mangione; Ayomide Folorunso; Anna Polinari; Eleonora Marchiando	3:28.61 NR	Poland; Anna Kiełbasińska; Marika Popowicz-Drapała; Alicja Wrona-Kutrzepa; Anna Pałys	3:29.31 SB

=== Field ===
Chronology: 2019 | 2021 | 2023 | 2025 | 2027

Event	Gold		Silver		Bronze	
High jump	Yaroslava Mahuchikh; Ukraine	1.98	Britt Weerman; Netherlands	1.96 =NR	Kateryna Tabashnyk; Ukraine	1.94
Pole vault	Wilma Murto; Finland	4.80 NR	Tina Šutej; Slovenia	4.75	Amálie Švábíková; Czech Republic	4.70
Long jump	Jazmin Sawyers; Great Britain	7.00 WL NR	Larissa Iapichino; Italy	6.97 NR	Ivana Vuleta; Serbia	6.91
Triple jump	Tuğba Danışmaz; Turkey	14.31 NR	Dariya Derkach; Italy	14.20	Patrícia Mamona; Portugal	14.16
Shot put	Auriol Dongmo; Portugal	19.76 EL	Sara Gambetta; Germany	18.83 SB	Fanny Roos; Sweden	18.42

=== Combined ===
Chronology: 2019 | 2021 | 2023 | 2025 | 2027

Event	Gold		Silver		Bronze	
Pentathlon	Nafissatou Thiam; Belgium	5055 WR	Adrianna Sułek; Poland	5014 NR	Noor Vidts; Belgium	4823 SB

== Legend ==
WR: world record | ER: European record | CR: championship record | NR: national record | WL: world leading | EL: European leading | PB: personal best | SB: seasonal best

== Medal table ==
* Host nation (Turkey)

Rank	Nation	Gold	Silver	Bronze	Total
1	Norway	4	1	0	5
2	Netherlands	3	3	1	7
3	Great Britain	3	1	2	6
4	Italy	2	4	0	6
5	Belgium	2	1	3	6
6	Portugal	2	0	1	3
6	Switzerland	2	0	1	3
8	Finland	2	0	0	2
9	France	1	2	3	6
10	Germany	1	2	1	4
11	Greece	1	2	0	3
12	Ukraine	1	1	2	4
13	Spain	1	1	0	2
14	Turkey*	1	0	0	1
15	Poland	0	4	3	7
16	Slovenia	0	2	0	2
17	Sweden	0	1	3	4
18	Czech Republic	0	1	1	2
18	Romania	0	1	1	2
20	Serbia	0	0	2	2
21	Estonia	0	0	1	1
Totals (21 entries)		26	27	25	78

== Placing table ==
The top eight finalists in each event scored points for their nation, with 8 points going to the gold medalists down to one point for each 8th-place finisher. Non-finishers and disqualified athletes received zero points.

Rank	Country	1st place, gold medalist(s)	2nd place, silver medalist(s)	3rd place, bronze medalist(s)	4	5	6	7	8	Finalists	Points
1	Italy	2	4	-	3	2	3	2	4	20	84
2	Great Britain	3	1	2	-	3	4	2	2	17	72.50
3	Netherlands	3	3	1	1	1	2	1	1	13	69
4	Germany	1	2	1	4	-	1	4	2	15	61
5	France	1	2	3	-	3	1	1	1	12	58
6	Poland	-	4	3	1	1	1	-	-	10	57.50
7	Belgium	2	1	3	1	-	2	2	1	12	57
8	Spain	1	1	-	5	1	1	2	1	12	52
9	Norway	4	1	-	-	-	1	1	1	8	45
10	Portugal	2	-	1	2	1	1	-	2	9	41
11	Switzerland	2	-	1	-	1	3	1	-	8	37
12	Czech Republic	-	1	1	1	3	2	-	1	9	37
13	Sweden	-	1	3	-	1	-	2	2	9	35
14	Ukraine	1	1	2	-	1	-	-	-	5	31
15	Greece	1	2	-	1	-	-	1	-	5	28.50
16	Slovenia	-	2	-	-	1	-	-	1	4	19
17	Romania	-	1	1	-	1	-	1	-	4	18.50
18	Finland	2	-	-	-	-	-	1	-	3	18
19	Serbia	-	-	2	1	-	-	-	1	4	18
20	Ireland	-	-	-	1	1	1	-	-	3	12
21	Turkey	1	-	-	-	-	1	-	-	2	11
22	Luxembourg	-	-	-	-	2	-	-	1	3	9
23	Hungary	-	-	-	-	1	1	1	-	3	9
24	Austria	-	-	-	1	-	-	1	-	2	7
24	Bosnia and Herzegovina	-	-	-	1	-	-	1	-	2	7
26	Estonia	-	-	1	-	-	-	-	-	1	6
27	Bulgaria	-	-	-	1	-	-	-	-	1	5
27	Croatia	-	-	-	1	-	-	-	-	1	5
27	Denmark	-	-	-	1	-	-	-	-	1	5
30	Azerbaijan	-	-	-	-	1	-	-	-	1	4
30	Slovakia	-	-	-	-	1	-	-	-	1	4
32	Lithuania	-	-	-	-	-	1	-	-	1	3
33	Moldova	-	-	-	-	-	-	1	-	1	2

== Participating nations ==
550 athletes from 47 member federations competed in the championships. In brackets the number of athletes participating.

- Albania (1)
- Andorra (2)
- Armenia (2)
- Austria (3)
- Azerbaijan (2)
- Belgium (20)
- Bosnia and Herzegovina (3)
- Bulgaria (5)
- Croatia (6)
- Cyprus (4)
- Czech Republic (14)
- Denmark (8)
- Estonia (6)
- Finland (20)
- France (38)
- Georgia (2)
- Germany (28)
- Gibraltar (2)
- Great Britain (29)
- Greece (18)
- Hungary (15)
- Iceland (2)
- Ireland (12)
- Italy (49)
- Kosovo (2)
- Latvia (3)
- Lithuania (6)
- Luxembourg (5)
- Malta (2)
- Moldova (1)
- Monaco (1)
- Montenegro (1)
- Netherlands (29)
- North Macedonia (2)
- Norway (18)
- Poland (25)
- Portugal (22)
- Romania (14)
- San Marino (2)
- Serbia (12)
- Slovakia (3)
- Slovenia (12)
- Spain (29)
- Sweden (20)
- Switzerland (23)
- Turkey (17) (hosts)
- Ukraine (10)

== Media coverage ==
The European Athletics agreed broadcasting agreements with 26 countries, with remaining areas receiving coverage direct from the European Athletics via the Eurovision All Athletics platform.

- Austria: ORF Sport +
- Belgium: RTBF, VRT
- Croatia: HRT (evening sessions 3 & 4 March + all sessions 5 March) and All Athletics (remaining sessions)
- Czech Republic: CT
- Denmark: DR
- Estonia: ERR
- Finland: Yle
- France: France TV (evening sessions 3, 4 & 5 March) and All Athletics (remaining sessions)
- Greece: ERT
- Hungary: M4 Sport
- Iceland: RÚV (all sessions 3, 4, 5 March) and All Athletics (all sessions 2 March)
- Ireland: RTÉ
- Israel: The Sport Channel
- Italy: RAI
- Lithuania: LRT (evening sessions 3 & 4 March + all sessions 5 March) and All Athletics (remaining sessions)
- Netherlands: NOS
- Norway: NRK (evening sessions 3, 4 & 5 March) and All Athletics (remaining sessions)
- Poland: TVP
- Portugal: RTP and All Athletics
- Serbia: RTS (all evening sessions + morning session 5 March) and All Athletics (remaining sessions)
- Spain: RTVE
- Sweden: SVT
- Switzerland: SRG
- Turkey: TRT Spor Yildiz
- Ukraine: PBC
- United Kingdom: BBC
