= Turkey at the European Athletics Championships =

- WA code: TUR
- National federation: Turkish Athletic Federation
- Website: www.taf.org.tr
- Medals Ranked 19th: Gold 11 Silver 8 Bronze 9 Total 28

European Athletics Championships appearances (overview)
- 1950; 1954; 1958; 1962; 1966; 1969; 1971; 1974; 1978; 1982; 1986; 1990; 1994; 1998; 2002; 2006; 2010; 2012; 2014; 2016; 2018; 2022; 2024

Turkey has been participating at the European Athletics Championships since its 4th edition in 1950.

== Medalists ==
#	Medal	Name	Year	Event
1	Gold	Süreyya Ayhan	2002 Munich	Women's 1500 metres
2	Gold	Nevin Yanıt	2010 Barcelona	Women's 100 metres hurdles
3	Gold	Elvan Abeylegesse	2010 Barcelona	Women's 5000 metres
4	Gold	Elvan Abeylegesse	2010 Barcelona	Women's 10,000 metres
5	Gold	Gülcan Mıngır	2012 Helsinki	Women's 3000 metres steeplechase
6	Gold	Polat Kemboi Arıkan	2012 Helsinki	Men's 10,000 metres
7	Gold	Polat Kemboi Arıkan	2016 Amsterdam	Men's 10,000 metres
8	Gold	Yasmani Copello	2016 Amsterdam	Men's 400 metres hurdles
9	Gold	Yasemin Can	2016 Amsterdam	Women's 5000 metres
10	Gold	Yasemin Can	2016 Amsterdam	Women's 10,000 metres
11	Gold	Ramil Guliyev	2018 Berlin	Men's 200 metres
12	Silver	Tarık Langat Akdağ	2012 Helsinki	Men's 3000 metres steeplechase
13	Silver	Jak Ali Harvey	2016 Amsterdam	Men's 100 metres
14	Silver	Ramil Guliyev	2016 Amsterdam	Men's 200 metres
15	Silver	Ali Kaya	2016 Amsterdam	Men's 10,000 metres
16	Silver	Kaan Kigen Özbilen	2016 Amsterdam	Men's half marathon
17	Silver	Aras Kaya	2016 Amsterdam	Men's 3000 metres steeplechase
18	Silver	Yasmani Copello	2018 Berlin	Men's 400 metres hurdles
19	Silver	Emre Zafer Barnes; Jak Ali Harvey; Yiğitcan Hekimoğlu; Ramil Guliyev	2018 Berlin	Men's 4 x 100 metres relay
20	Bronze	Ruhi Sarıalp	1950 Brussels	Men's triple jump
21	Bronze	Elvan Abeylegesse	2006 Gothenburg	Women's 5000 metres
22	Bronze	Polat Kemboi Arıkan	2012 Helsinki	Men's 5000 metres
23	Bronze	Ali Kaya	2014 Zürich	Men's 10,000 metres
24	Bronze	Turkey	2016 Amsterdam	Women's half marathon
25	Bronze	Özlem Kaya	2016 Amsterdam	Women's 3000 metres steeplechase
26	Bronze	Emel Dereli	2016 Amsterdam	Women's shot put
27	Bronze	Jak Ali Harvey	2018 Berlin	Men's 100 metres
28	Bronze	Yasemin Can	2018 Berlin	Women's 5000 metres

== Summary ==
Championships	Athletes	Gold	Silver	Bronze	Total	Rank
(Belgium) 1950 Brussels	10	0	0	1	1	14
(Switzerland) 1954 Bern	16	0	0	0	0	–
(Sweden) 1958 Stockholm	5	0	0	0	0	–
(Socialist Federal Republic of Yugoslavia) 1962 Belgrade	11	0	0	0	0	–
(Hungary) 1966 Budapest	10	0	0	0	0	–
(Greece) 1969 Athens	10	0	0	0	0	–
(Finland) 1971 Helsinki	9	0	0	0	0	–
(Italy) 1974 Rome	Did not participate					
(Czechoslovakia) 1978 Prague	5	0	0	0	0	–
(Greece) 1982 Athens	2	0	0	0	0	–
(West Germany) 1986 Stuttgart	6	0	0	0	0	–
(Socialist Federal Republic of Yugoslavia) 1990 Split	8	0	0	0	0	–
(Finland) 1994 Helsinki	6	0	0	0	0	–
(Hungary) 1998 Budapest	Did not participate					
(Germany) 2002 Munich	8	1	0	0	1	17
(Sweden) 2006 Gothenburg	15	0	0	1	1	30
(Spain) 2010 Barcelona	20	3	0	0	3	6
(Finland) 2012 Helsinki	44	2	1	1	4	8
(Switzerland) 2014 Zürich	29	0	0	1	1	23
(Netherlands) 2016 Amsterdam	44	4	5	2	11	4
(Germany) 2018 Berlin	38	1	2	2	5	13
(Germany) 2022 Munich	41	1	1	1	3	16
Total		12	9	9	30	22

== See also ==
- Turkey at the World Championships in Athletics
