= Turkey at the 2016 European Athletics Championships =

- WA code: TUR

in Amsterdam
- Medals Ranked 4th: Gold 4 Silver 5 Bronze 3 Total 12

European Athletics Championships appearances (overview)
- 1950; 1954; 1958; 1962; 1966; 1969; 1971; 1974; 1978; 1982; 1986; 1990; 1994; 1998; 2002; 2006; 2010; 2012; 2014; 2016; 2018; 2022; 2024

Turkey competed at the 2016 European Athletics Championships in Amsterdam, Netherlands, between 6 and 10 July 2016.

Turkey participated at the championship with 55 athletes winning a total of twelve medals (four gold, five silver and three bronze). One of the bronze medals was awarded to the team in half marathon.

== Medals by event ==
Event	Men				Women				Total			
Event	G	S	B	Total	G	S	B	Total	G	S	B	Total
100 m	-	1	-	1	-	-	-	0	-	1	-	1
200 m	-	1	-	1	-	-	-	0	-	1	-	1
5,000 m	-	-	-	0	1	-	-	1	1	-	-	1
10,000 m	1	1	-	2	1	-	-	1	2	1	-	3
Half marathon	-	1	-	1	-	-	1	1	-	1	1	2
400 m hurdles	1	-	-	1	-	-	-	0	1	-	-	1
3,000 m steeplechase	-	1	-	1	-	-	1	1	-	1	1	2
Shot put	-	-	-	0	-	-	1	1	-	-	1	1
Total	2	5	0	7	2	0	3	5	4	5	3	12

== Results ==
=== Men ===
==== Track and road events ====
Event	Athletes	Heat Round 1		Heat Round 2		Semifinal		Final	
Event	Athletes	Result	Rank	Result	Rank	Result	Rank	Result	Rank
100 m	Ramil Guliyev	10.21	1	—		10.07	4	10.23	6
100 m	Jak Ali Harvey	10.04	2	—		10.04	2	10.07	2nd place, silver medalist(s)
200 m	Ramil Guliyev	—				20.69	8	20.51	2nd place, silver medalist(s)
400 m	Batuhan Altıntaş	47.23	15	—		Did not advance			
400 m	Yavuz Can	—				45.51 NR	7	Did not advance	
1,500 m	Levent Ateş	3:43.25	19	—				Did not advance	
10,000 m	Polat Kemboi Arıkan	—						28:18.52	1st place, gold medalist(s)
10,000 m	Ali Kaya	—						28:21.42	2nd place, silver medalist(s)
Half marathon	Kaan Kigen Özbilen	—						1:02:27	2nd place, silver medalist(s)
400 m hurdles	Yasmani Copello	—				48.42 NR	1	48.98	1st place, gold medalist(s)
3,000 m steeplechase	Tarık Langat Akdağ	8:43.81	18	—				Did not advance	
3,000 m steeplechase	Hakan Duvar	8:33.13 SB	8	—				8:44.03	12
3,000 m steeplechase	Aras Kaya	8:33.11	7	—				8:29.91 PB	2nd place, silver medalist(s)
4 × 400 m relay	Halit Kılıç; Yasmani Copello Escobar; Batuhan Altıntaş; Yavuz Can	3:04.65	9	—				Did not advance	

==== Field events ====
Event	Athletes	Heat Round 1		Heat Round 2		Semifinal		Final	
Event	Athletes	Result	Rank	Result	Rank	Result	Rank	Result	Rank
Triple jump	Şeref Osmanoğlu	16.81	3	—				16.55	6
Triple jump	Aşkın Karaca	16.19	21	—				Did not advance	
Discus throw	Ercüment Olgundeniz	NM		—				Did not advance	
Hammer throw	Eşref Apak	NM		—				Did not advance	
Hammer throw	Özkan Baltacı	70.67	8	—				71.35	9

=== Women ===
==== Track and road events ====
Event	Athletes	Heat Round 1		Heat Round 2		Semifinal		Final	
Event	Athletes	Result	Rank	Result	Rank	Result	Rank	Result	Rank
5,000 m	Yasemin Can	—						15:18.15	1st place, gold medalist(s)
10,000 m	Yasemin Can	—						31:12.86 EL, EU23	1st place, gold medalist(s)
Half marathon	Esma Aydemir	—						1:11:49	5
Half marathon	Sultan Haydar	—						1:12:34	11
Half marathon	Sevilay Eytemis	—						1:15:36	43
Half marathon	Turkey	—						3:39:59	3rd place, bronze medalist(s)
400 m hurdles	Elif Yıldırım	58.40	20	—		Did not advance			
3,000 m steeplechase	Meryem Akda	9:45.69	9	—				9:55.42	13
3,000 m steeplechase	Özlem Kaya	9:44.41	7	—				9:35.05	3rd place, bronze medalist(s)
3,000 m steeplechase	Elif Karabulut	Did not finish		—				Did not advance	
4 × 400 m relay	Berfe Sancak; Meryem Kasap; Emel Şanlı; Elif Yıldırım	3:38.47	16	—				Did not advance	

==== Field events ====
Event	Athletes	Heat Round 1		Heat Round 2		Semifinal		Final	
Event	Athletes	Result	Rank	Result	Rank	Result	Rank	Result	Rank
Long jump	Karin Melis Mey	6.55	4	—				6.62	5
Shot put	Emel Dereli	17.88	2	—				18.22	3rd place, bronze medalist(s)
Javelin throw	Eda Tuğsuz	58.13	12	—				56.97	11
Hammer throw	Kıvılcım Salman	65.97	17	—				Did not advance	
Hammer throw	Tuğçe Şahutoğlu	62.37	28	—				Did not advance	
