= 2021 Turkish Indoor Athletics Championships =

- Dates: 5–7 February
- Host city: Istanbul
- Venue: Ataköy Athletics Arena
- Events: 26

The 2021 Turkish Indoor Athletics Championships was the tenth edition of Turkey's national championship in indoor athletics. It was held from 5–7 February in Istanbul at the Ataköy Athletics Arena.

In the men's pole vault, Ersu Şaşma set a Turkish indoor record of 5.72 m.

== Results ==
=== Men ===
Event	Gold		Silver		Bronze	
60 metres	Kayhan Özer	6.67 s PB	Aykut Ay	6.79 s	Aşkın Sadi Aşkın	6.87 s PB
200 metres	Oğuz Uyar	21.25 s PB	Batuhan Altıntaş	21.35 s SB	Cafer Güneş	21.86 s
400 metres	Berke Akçam	47.46 s	Yavuz Can	47.64 s SB	Kubilay Ençü	47.75 s PB
800 metres	Murat Yalçınkaya	1:51.76 min	Abdullah Özdemir	1:52.11 min PB	Mehmet Körpe	1:53.50 min
1500 metres	Devrim Kazan	3:47.61 min PB	Abdullah Özdemir	3:49.09 min	Levent Ateş	3:49.88 min SB
3000 metres	Abdurrahman Gedikoğlu	7:57.43 min PB	Devrim Kazan	8:07.04 min PB	Cihat Ulus	8:22.26 min SB
60 m hurdles	Mikdat Sevler	7.80 s	Furkan Aktaş	7.86 s PB	Tibet Sancak	8.10 s
High jump	Alperen Acet	2.22 m =SB	Enes Talha Şenses	2.18 m	Metin Doğu	2.15 m SB
Pole vault	Ersu Şaşma	5.72 m NR	Zeki Cem Tenekebüken	5.10 m SB	Mustafa Berkay Gürmerıc	4.80 m =SB
Long jump	Muammer Demir	7.74 m SB	Alper Kulaksız	7.53 m	Musa Tüzen	7.44 m PB
Triple jump	Can Özüpek	16.41 m SB	Mert Çiçek	15.56 m SB	Ali Çolak	14.56 m
Shot put	Melih Yersel	16.67 m PB	Hasan Saygi	16.50 m PB	Kadir Koratosun	13.22 m PB

=== Women ===
Event	Gold		Silver		Bronze	
60 metres	Mizgin Ay	7.44 s SB	Yudum İlıksız	7.56 s	Burcu Erdemir	7.58 s
200 metres	Elif Polat	24.51 s PB	Edanur Kılıç	25.03 s PB	Şerife Uysal	26.22 s PB
400 metres	Emel Şanlı-Kırçın	54.12 s SB	Elif Polat	56.77 s	Ecem Ece	57.38 s PB
800 metres	Tuğba Toptaş	2:09.38 min	Damla Çelik	2:14.33 min	Kübra Tatar	2:15.01 min SB
1500 metres	Emine Hatun Mechaal	4:26.40 min SB	Rahime Tekın	4:29.04 min SB	Fatma Arik	4:29.87 min SB
3000 metres	Gamze Bulut	9:27.30 min PB	Burcu Subatan	9:29.72 min	Rümeysa Coşkun	9:34.56 min PB
60 m hurdles	Özge Soylu-Can	8.54 s	Hayrun Nisa Kapar	9.02 s PB	Seda Albayrak	9.35 s PB
High jump	Buse Savaşkan	1.82 m	Kadriye Aydın	1.79 m SB	Merve Menekşe	1.76 m SB
Pole vault	Mesure Tutku Yılmaz	4.30 m =PB	Buse Arıkazan	4.25 m =SB	Sumeyye Kinar	3.20 m
Long jump	Emine Selda Kırdemir	5.82 m PB	Cemre Bıtgın	5.71 m SB	Seyma Bırıncı	5.29 m SB
Triple jump	Beyza Gülenç	13.24 m	Esra Yılmaz	12.76 m SB	?	
Shot put	Emel Dereli	17.50 m SB	Pınar Akyol	16.15 m SB	Aysel Yılmaz	14.97 m

== See also ==
- Turkish Athletics Championships
- Turkish Indoor Athletics Championships
