= Turkey at the 2022 European Athletics Championships =

- Flag of Turkey
- WA code: TUR
- National federation: Turkish Athletic Federation

in Munich, Germany 15 August 2022 – 21 August 2022
- Competitors: 40 (25 men and 15 women) in 27 events
- Medals Ranked 16th: Gold 1 Silver 1 Bronze 1 Total 3

European Athletics Championships appearances (overview)
- 1950; 1954; 1958; 1962; 1966; 1969; 1971; 1974; 1978; 1982; 1986; 1990; 1994; 1998; 2002; 2006; 2010; 2012; 2014; 2016; 2018; 2022; 2024; 2026

Turkey competed at the 2022 European Athletics Championships in Munich, Germany, between 15 and 21 August 2022

== Medallists ==
Medal	Name	Event	Date
Gold	Yasemin Can	Women's 10,000 metres	16 August
Silver	Yasemin Can	Women's 5000 metres	18 August
Bronze	Yasmani Copello	Men's 400 metres hurdles	19 August

== Results ==
Turkey entered the following athletes.

Key

- Q = Qualified for the next round
- q = Qualified for the next round as a fastest loser or, in field events, by position without achieving the qualifying target
- NR = National record
- PB = Personal best
- SB = Season best
- N/A = Round not applicable for the event

=== Men ===
Track and road events

Athlete	Event	Heat		Semifinal		Final	
Athlete	Event	Result	Rank	Result	Rank	Result	Rank
Kayhan Özer	100 m	10.31	6 Q	10.34	20	Did not advance	
Emre Zafer Barnes	100 m	10.33	7 Q	10.41	22	Did not advance	
Jak Ali Harvey	100 m	Bye		DQ		Did not advance	
Ramil Guliyev	200 m	Bye		20.44	9 Q	DNF	
Aras Kaya	10,000 m	—N/a				28:23.77	16
Ömer Alkanoğlu	Marathon	—N/a				DNF	
Polat Kemboi Arıkan	Marathon	—N/a				DNF	
Mikdat Sevler	110 m hurdles	Bye		DNS		Did not advance	
Yasmani Copello	400 m hurdles	Bye		49.34	8 Q	48.78	3rd place, bronze medalist(s)
İsmail Nezir	400 m hurdles	Bye		49.78	16	Did not advance	
Hillary Yego	3000 m steeplechase	8:43.76	23	—N/a		Did not advance	
Salih Korkmaz	20 km walk	—N/a				1:20:50 PB	7
Abdulselam İmük	20 km walk	—N/a				DNF	
Şahin Şenoduncu	20 km walk	—N/a				DQ	
Emre Zafer Barnes; Jak Ali Harvey; Kayhan Özer; Ertan Özkan	4 × 100 m relay	38.98	7 q	—N/a		39.20	7
Oğuzhan Kaya; Kubilay Ençü; Batuhan Altıntaş; İsmail Nezir	4 × 400 m relay	3:06.68	14	—N/a		Did not advance	

Field events

Athlete	Event	Qualification		Final	
Athlete	Event	Distance	Position	Distance	Position
Enes Talha Şenses	High jump	2.12	23	Did not advance	
Ersu Şaşma	Pole vault	5.50	19	Did not advance	
Necati Er	Triple jump	NM		Did not advance	
Alperen Karahan	Shot put	19.25	20	Did not advance	
Özkan Baltacı	Hammer throw	70.34	22	Did not advance	
Emin Öncel	Javelin throw	68.97	24	Did not advance	

=== Women ===
Track and road events

Athlete	Event	Heat		Semifinal		Final	
Athlete	Event	Result	Rank	Result	Rank	Result	Rank
Ekaterina Guliyev	800 m	2:01.59	3 Q	2:01.32	10	Did not advance	
Yasemin Can	5000 m	—N/a				14:56.91	2nd place, silver medalist(s)
Yasemin Can	10,000 m	—N/a				30:32.57 SB	1st place, gold medalist(s)
Tuğba Güvenç	3000 m steeplechase	9:31.86 SB	2 Q	—N/a		9:25.58 PB	5
Ruken Tek	3000 m steeplechase	10:31.84	31	—N/a		Did not advance	
Meryem Bekmez	20 km walk	—N/a				1:39:30	17
Kader Dost	20 km walk	—N/a				1:42:26	19
Ayşe Tekdal	20 km walk	—N/a				DNF	

Field events

Athlete	Event	Qualification		Final	
Athlete	Event	Distance	Position	Distance	Position
Buse Arıkazan	Pole vault	NM		Did not advance	
Gizem Akgöz	Triple jump	13.40	18	Did not advance	
Tuğba Danışmaz	Triple jump	NM		Did not advance	
Emel Dereli	Shot put	16.56	21	Did not advance	
Pınar Akyol	Shot put	15.89	23	Did not advance	
Özlem Becerek	Discus throw	56.01	19	Did not advance	
Kıvılcım Kaya	Hammer throw	67.68	12 q	67.04	11
Eda Tuğsuz	Javelin throw	56.33	15	Did not advance	
