= Turkey at the 2024 European Athletics Championships =

- Flag of Turkey
- WA code: TUR

in Rome, Italy 7 June 2024 – 12 June 2024
- Competitors: 42 (23 men and 19 women)
- Medals Ranked 22nd: Gold 0 Silver 1 Bronze 1 Total 2

European Athletics Championships appearances (overview)
- 1950; 1954; 1958; 1962; 1966; 1969; 1971; 1974; 1978; 1982; 1986; 1990; 1994; 1998; 2002; 2006; 2010; 2012; 2014; 2016; 2018; 2022; 2024

Turkey competed at the 2024 European Athletics Championships in Rome, Italy from 7–12 June 2024.

== Medallists ==
Medal	Name	Event	Date
Silver	Tuğba Danışmaz	Women's triple jump	9 June
Bronze	Ersu Şaşma	Men's pole vault	12 June

== Results ==
Turkey entered the following athletes.

Key

- Q = Qualified for the next round
- q = Qualified for the next round as a fastest loser or, in field events, by position without achieving the qualifying target
- NR = National record
- PB = Personal best
- SB = Season best
- N/A = Round not applicable for the event

=== Men ===
Track and road events

Athlete	Event	Heat		Semifinal		Final	
Athlete	Event	Result	Rank	Result	Rank	Result	Rank
Kayhan Özer	100 metres	10.34	9 q	10.45	22	Did not advance	
Ramil Guliyev	200 metres	20.66 SB	5 q	20.87	17	Did not advance	
Salih Teksöz	800 metres	1:47.80	29	Did not advance			
Mehmet Çelik	1500 metres	3:44.65	20	—N/a		Did not advance	
Polat Kemboi Arıkan	Half marathon	—N/a				DNF	
Sezgin Ataç	Half marathon	—N/a				DNF	
İlham Tanui Özbilen	Half marathon	—N/a				1:04:42 SB	35
Polat Kemboi Arıkan; Sezgin Ataç; İlham Tanui Özbilen	Half marathon team	—N/a				DNF	
Mikdat Sevler	110 metres hurdles	13.72	8 q	13.68	14	Did not advance	
Berke Akçam	400 metres hurdles	49.32	2 q	48.14 EU23L	2 Q	48.17	5
Yasmani Copello	400 metres hurdles	Bye		50.57 SB	23	Did not advance	
İsmail Nezir	400 metres hurdles	Bye		51.29	24	Did not advance	
Abdullah Tuğluk	3000 metres steeplechase	8:56.54	30	—N/a		Did not advance	
Mazlum Demir	20 kilometres walk	—N/a				1:26:33	24
Salih Korkmaz	20 kilometres walk	—N/a				DNF	
Hayrettin Yıldız	20 kilometres walk	—N/a				DNF	
Kayhan Özer; Oğuz Uyar; Batuhan Altintaş; Mustafa Kemal Ay	4 × 100 metres relay	39.57	14	—N/a		Did not advance	

Field events

Athlete	Event	Qualification		Final	
Athlete	Event	Distance	Position	Distance	Position
Alperen Acet	High jump	2.21	13 q	2.22	10
Ersu Şaşma	Pole vault	5.60	6 q	5.82 =SB	3rd place, bronze medalist(s)
Necati Er	Triple jump	16.75 SB	7 Q	16.61	9
Can Özüpek	Triple jump	16.68	10 Q	16.23	10
Özkan Baltacı	Hammer throw	71.58	25	Did not advance	

=== Women ===
Track and road events

Athlete	Event	Heat		Semifinal		Final	
Athlete	Event	Result	Rank	Result	Rank	Result	Rank
Dilek Koçak	800 metres	2:02.87	25	Did not advance			
Emine Hatun Mechaal	5000 metres	—N/a				15:31.30	18
Burcu Subatan	5000 metres	—N/a				16:16:89	20
Bahar Atalay	10,000 metres	—N/a				DNF	
Yonca Kutluk	10,000 metres	—N/a				34:01.21	25
Meryem Erdoğan	Half marathon	—N/a				DNF	
Özlem Kaya Alıcı	Half marathon	—N/a				1:16:04	56
Tuğba Güvenç	3000 metres steeplechase	9:53.37	25	—N/a		Did not advance	
Sümeyye Erol	3000 metres steeplechase	9:45.36	22	—N/a		Did not advance	
Derya Kunur	3000 metres steeplechase	9:44.51	20	—N/a		Did not advance	
Meryem Bekmez	20 kilometres walk	—N/a				DNF	
Ayşe Tekdal	20 kilometres walk	—N/a				DQ	

Field events

Athlete	Event	Qualification		Final	
Athlete	Event	Distance	Position	Distance	Position
Buse Savaşkan	High jump	1.89	11 q	1.86	10
Gizem Akgöz	Triple jump	13.47	22	Did not advance	
Tuğba Danışmaz	Triple jump	14.27	2 Q	14.57 NR	2nd place, silver medalist(s)
Emel Dereli	Shot put	17.66	11 q	17.52	11
Özlem Becerek	Discus throw	55.73	21	Did not advance	
Eda Tuğsuz	Javelin throw	53.29	20	Did not advance	
Esra Türkmen	Javelin throw	52.05	28	Did not advance	
