= Turkish Indoor Athletics Championships =

Annual track and field competition

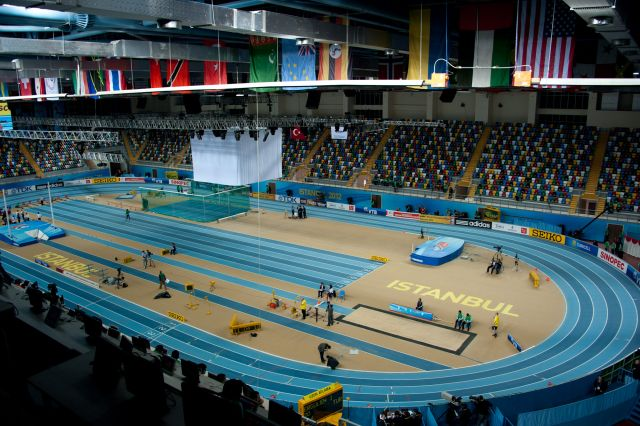
- The host stadium, Ataköy Athletics Arena
- Sport: Track and field
- Founded: 2012
- Country: Turkey

The Turkish Indoor Athletics Championships is an annual indoor track and field competition organised by the Turkish Athletic Federation, which serves as the national championship for the sport in Turkey.

The competition was first held in 2012, following the construction of the country's first international quality indoor track and field stadium – the Ataköy Athletics Arena. This venue was constructed to host the 2012 IAAF World Indoor Championships.

== Events ==
The following athletics events feature as standard on the Turkish Indoor Championships programme:

- Sprint: 60 m, 200 m, 400 m
- Distance track events: 800 m, 1500 m, 3000 m
- Hurdles: 60 m hurdles
- Jumps: long jump, triple jump, high jump, pole vault
- Throws: shot put
- Combined events: heptathlon (men), pentathlon (women)

== Editions ==
| Ed. | Year | Location | Dates | Venue | Events |
|---|---|---|---|---|---|
| 1st | 2012 | Istanbul | 26–28 January | Ataköy Athletics Arena | 16 |
| 2nd | 2013 | Istanbul | 26–27 January | Ataköy Athletics Arena | |
| 3rd | 2014 | Istanbul | 15–16 February | Ataköy Athletics Arena | |
| 4th | 2015 | Istanbul | | Ataköy Athletics Arena | |
| 5th | 2016 | Istanbul | | Ataköy Athletics Arena | |
| 6th | 2017 | Istanbul | | Ataköy Athletics Arena | |
| 7th | 2018 | Istanbul | | Ataköy Athletics Arena | |
| 8th | 2019 | Istanbul | | Ataköy Athletics Arena | |
| 9th | 2020 | Istanbul | | Ataköy Athletics Arena | |
| 10th | 2021 | Istanbul | 5–7 February | Ataköy Athletics Arena | |
| 11th | 2022 | Istanbul | 25–27 February | Ataköy Athletics Arena | |
| 12th | 2023 | Istanbul | 14–15 March | Ataköy Athletics Arena | |
| 13th | 2024 | Istanbul | 17–18 February | Ataköy Athletics Arena | |

== Championships records ==
=== Men ===
| Event | Record | Athlete/Team | Date | Championships | Place | Ref. |
|---|---|---|---|---|---|---|
| Pole vault | 5.72 m NR | Ersu Şaşma | 7 February 2021 | 2021 Championships | Istanbul | |
| Triple jump | 16.62 m NR | Can Ozupek | 3 February 2019 | 2019 Championships | Istanbul | |
| 5000 m walk | 19:13.59 NR | Salih Korkmaz | 11 January 2020 | 2020 Championships | Istanbul | |

=== Women ===
| Event | Record | Athlete/Team | Date | Championships | Place | Ref. |
|---|---|---|---|---|---|---|
| 300 m | 38.20 NR | Elif Polat | 14 March 2023 | 2023 Championships | Istanbul | |
| 1500 m | 4:07.94 | Gamze Bulut | 15 February 2014 | 2014 Championships | Istanbul | |
| 3000 m walk | 12:31.08 NR | Meryem Bekmez | 11 January 2020 | 2020 Championships | Istanbul | |

== See also ==
- Turkish Athletics Championships
- 2021 Turkish Indoor Athletics Championships
