= 2015 European Athletics U23 Championships – Men's 10,000 metres =

The men's 10,000 metres event at the 2015 European Athletics U23 Championships was held in Tallinn, Estonia, at Kadriorg Stadium on 9 July.

== Medalists ==
Gold	Ali Kaya; Turkey
Silver	Mikhail Strelkov; Russia
Bronze	Yassine Rachik; Italy

== Results ==
=== Final ===
9 July

Rank	Name	Nationality	Time	Notes
1st place, gold medalist(s)	Ali Kaya	Turkey	27:53.38	
2nd place, silver medalist(s)	Mikhail Strelkov	Russia	28:53.94	PB
3rd place, bronze medalist(s)	Yassine Rachik	Italy	28:53.99	SB
4	Bart van Nunen	Netherlands	28:59.90	PB
5	Damke Teshala	Israel	29:10.86	
6	Marc Scott	United Kingdom	29:21.99	
7	Dominik Notz	Germany	29:24.63	PB
8	Jaime Escriche	Spain	29:26.84	PB
9	Daniele D'Onofrio	Italy	29:27.34	PB
10	Dino Bošnjak	Croatia	29:45.86	
11	Kevin Dooney	Ireland	29:58.41	
12	Brandon Hargreaves	Ireland	30:06.73	
13	Sonmez Dag	Turkey	30:15.16	
14	Iliass Aouani	Italy	30:20.86	
15	Akoya Darsach	Israel	30:43.47	
16	Paweł Szostak	Poland	30:52.81	
17	Lahsene Bouchikhi	Belgium	30:53.62	
18	Reinis Hartmanis	Latvia	31:14.59	PB
19	Artur Bossy	Spain	31:46.20	
20	Hlynur Andrésson	Iceland	31:53.34	
	Mohamed Jelloul	Spain	DNF	
	Kieran Clements	United Kingdom	DNF	
	Samuel Barata	Portugal	DNF	

== Participation ==
According to an unofficial count, 23 athletes from 15 countries participated in the event.

- Belgium (1)
- Croatia (1)
- Germany (1)
- Iceland (1)
- Ireland (2)
- Israel (2)
- Italy (3)
- Latvia (1)
- Netherlands (1)
- Poland (1)
- Portugal (1)
- Russia (1)
- Spain (3)
- Turkey (2)
- United Kingdom (2)
