= Ersin Tacir =

Turkish racewalker

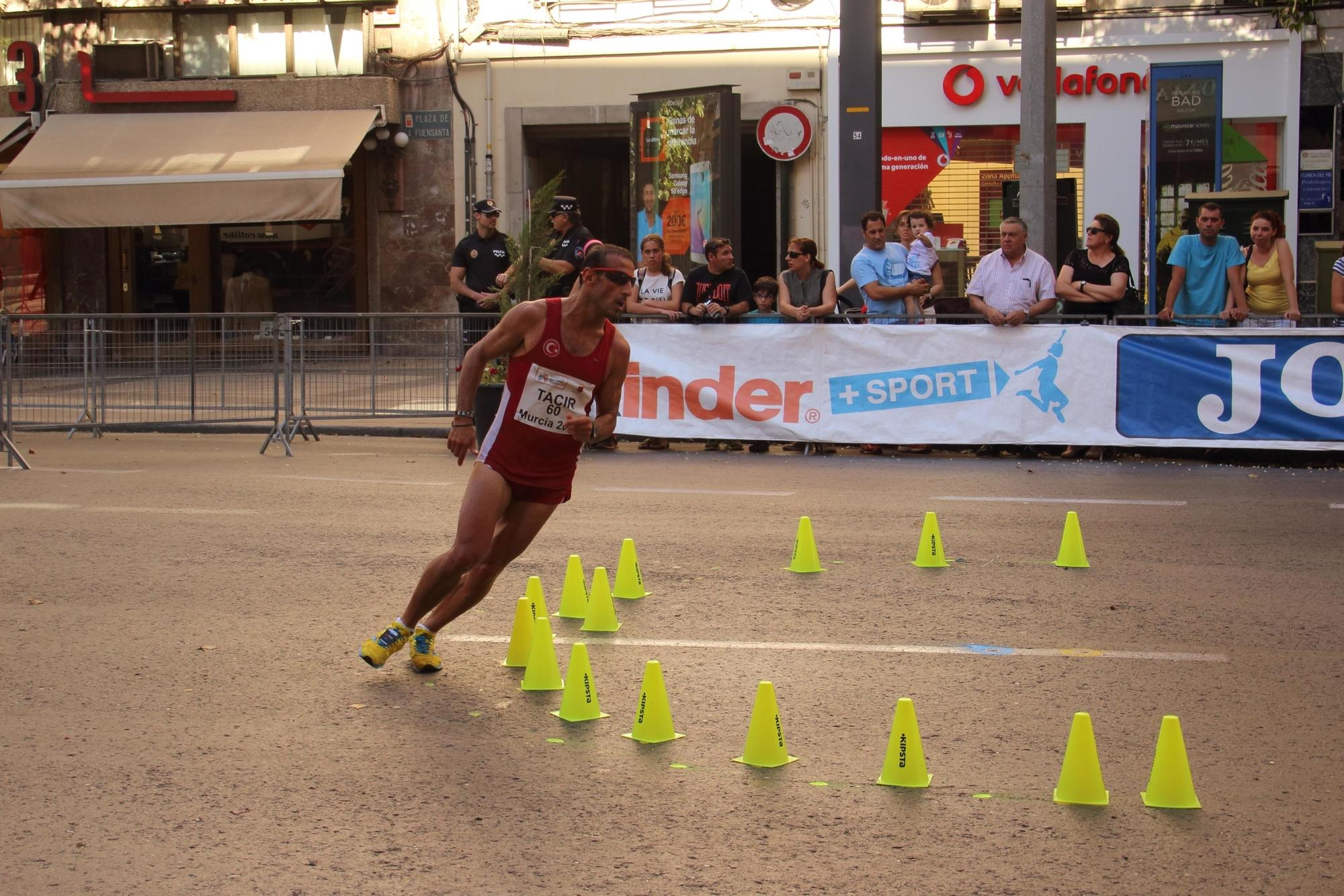
- Tacir in 2015

Personal information
- Nationality: Turkey
- Born: 1 April 1985 (age 40) Van, Turkey

Sport
- Sport: Race walker
- Club: PTT SK

Ersin Tacir (born 1 April 1985 in Van, Turkey) is a Turkish racewalker. He is a member of PTT SK.

He earned a quota spot for 2016 Summer Olympics with his performance in the 20 km race walk event at the European Athletics Poděbrady Walking 2016 in the Czech Republic. His time of 1:22:19 is a new national record as well.
