= European Athletics Indoor Championships =

International European track and field athletics indoor competitions

- Status: active
- Genre: sports event
- Frequency: biennial
- Location: various
- Inaugurated: 1970
- Most recent: 2025
- Next event: 2027
- Organiser: European Athletic Association
- Website: european-athletics.com

The European Athletics Indoor Championships is a biennial indoor track and field competition for European athletes that is organised by the European Athletic Association. It was held for the first time in 1970, replacing the European Indoor Games, its predecessor event first held in 1966.

The championships was an annual event until 1990, when it was changed to its current biennial format. A gap of three years occurred after the 2002 edition to synchronize the event with the other major championships of international athletics. The event is hosted by a different European city each year.

== Editions ==
=== European Indoor Games ===
Ed.	Year	Host city	Host country	Dates	Venue	Events	Nations	Athletes	Top of the medal table
1	1966	Dortmund	West Germany	27 March	Westfalenhalle	21	22	186	West Germany
2	1967	Prague	Czechoslovakia	11–12 March	Sportovni hala	23	23	244	Soviet Union
3	1968	Madrid	Spain	9–10 March	Palacio de los Deportes	23	20	205	Soviet Union
4	1969	Belgrade	Yugoslavia	8–9 March	Hala I Beogradskog sajma	23	22	220	East Germany

=== European Indoor Championships ===
Ed.	Year	Host city	Host country	Dates	Venue	Events	Nations	Athletes	Top of the medal table
1	1970	Vienna	Austria	14–15 March	Stadthalle	22	22	279	Soviet Union
2	1971	Sofia	Bulgaria	13–14 March	Festivalna	23	23	323	Soviet Union
3	1972	Grenoble	France	11–12 March	Palais des Sports	23	23	263	East Germany
4	1973	Rotterdam	Netherlands	10–11 March	Ahoy	23	24	307	West Germany
5	1974	Gothenburg	Sweden	9–10 March	Scandinavium	21	25	263	Poland
6	1975	Katowice	Poland	8–9 March	Spodek	21	24	270	East Germany
7	1976	Munich	West Germany	21–22 February	Olympiahalle	19	25	226	Soviet Union
8	1977	San Sebastián	Spain	12–13 March	Velódromo de Anoeta	19	24	240	East Germany
9	1978	Milan	Italy	11–12 March	Palasport di San Siro	19	25	252	East Germany
10	1979	Vienna	Austria	24–25 February	Ferry-Dusika-Hallenstadion	19	24	208	East Germany
11	1980	Sindelfingen	West Germany	1–2 March	Glaspalast Sindelfingen	19	26	234	West Germany
12	1981	Grenoble	France	21–22 February	Palais des Sports	20	23	255	East Germany
13	1982	Milan	Italy	6–7 March	Palasport di San Siro	23	23	282	West Germany
14	1983	Budapest	Hungary	5–6 March	Budapest Sportcsarnok	23	24	261	Soviet Union
15	1984	Gothenburg	Sweden	3–4 March	Scandinavium	22	26	240	Czechoslovakia
16	1985	Piraeus	Greece	2–3 March	Peace and Friendship Stadium	22	26	290	East Germany
17	1986	Madrid	Spain	22–23 February	Palacio de los Deportes	22	26	270	East Germany
18	1987	Liévin	France	21–22 February	Stade Couvert Régional	24	26	339	Soviet Union
19	1988	Budapest	Hungary	5–6 March	Budapest Sportcsarnok	24	27	358	East Germany
20	1989	The Hague	Netherlands	18–19 February	Houtrust	24	27	323	Soviet Union
21	1990	Glasgow	United Kingdom	3–4 March	Kelvin Hall Arena	25	28	370	Soviet Union
22	1992	Genoa	Italy	28 February – 1 March	Palasport di Genova	27	35	439	Unified Team
23	1994	Paris	France	11–13 March	Palais omnisports de Paris-Bercy	27	40	499	Russia
24	1996	Stockholm	Sweden	8–10 March	Globen	26	44	463	Germany
25	1998	Valencia	Spain	27 February – 1 March	Palau Velódrom Lluís Puig	26	39	484	Germany
26	2000	Ghent	Belgium	25–27 February	Flanders Sports Arena	28	44	546	Russia
27	2002	Vienna	Austria	1–3 March	Ferry-Dusika-Hallenstadion	28	45	558	Russia
28	2005	Madrid	Spain	4–6 March	Palacio de los Deportes	28	41	563	Russia
29	2007	Birmingham	United Kingdom	2–4 March	National Indoor Arena	26	47	519	Great Britain
30	2009	Turin	Italy	6–8 March	Oval Lingotto	26	45	530	Russia
31	2011	Paris	France	4–6 March	Palais omnisports de Paris-Bercy	26	46	577	France
32	2013	Gothenburg	Sweden	1–3 March	Scandinavium	26	47	578	Russia
33	2015	Prague	Czech Republic	5–8 March	O2 Arena	26	49	614	Russia
34	2017	Belgrade	Serbia	3–5 March	Belgrade Arena	26	48	525	Poland
35	2019	Glasgow	United Kingdom	1–3 March	Emirates Arena	26	47	582	Poland
36	2021	Toruń	Poland	4–7 March	Arena Toruń	26	46	659	Netherlands
37	2023	Istanbul	Turkey	2–5 March	Ataköy Athletics Arena	26	47	550	Norway
38	2025	Apeldoorn	Netherlands	6–9 March	Omnisport Apeldoorn	27	46	570	Netherlands
39	2027	Valencia	Spain	4–7 March	Palau Velódrom Lluís Puig				
40	2029	Toruń	Poland	1–4 March	Kujawsko-Pomorska Arena Toruń				

== Championship records ==
=== Men ===
Event	Record	Name	Nation	Date	Venue	Notes	Ref.	Video
60 m	6.42	Dwain Chambers	Great Britain	8 March 2009	2009 Turin			
400 m	45.05	Karsten Warholm	Norway	2 March 2019	2019 Glasgow			
800 m	1:44.78	Paweł Czapiewski	Poland	3 March 2002	2002 Vienna			
1500 m	3:33.95	Jakob Ingebrigtsen	Norway	3 March 2023	2023 Istanbul			
3000 m	7:38.42	Ali Kaya	Turkey	7 March 2015	2015 Prague			
60 m hurdles	7.39	Colin Jackson	Great Britain	12 March 1994	1994 Paris			
High jump	2.40 m	Stefan Holm	Sweden	6 March 2005	2005 Madrid			
Pole vault	6.05 m	Armand Duplantis	Sweden	7 March 2021	2021 Toruń			
Long jump	8.71 m	Sebastian Bayer	Germany	8 March 2009	2009 Turin			
Triple jump	17.92 m (2nd jump)	Teddy Tamgho	France	6 March 2011	2011 Paris			
Triple jump	17.92 m (4th jump)	Teddy Tamgho	France	6 March 2011	2011 Paris			
Shot put	22.19 m	Ulf Timmermann	East Germany	21 February 1987	1987 Liévin			
Heptathlon	6558 pts	Sander Skotheim	Norway	7 March 2025	2025 Apeldoorn			
Heptathlon	60m / Long jump / Shot put / High jump / 60m H / Pole vault / 1000m; 6.93 / 7.95 m / 14.39 m / 2.19 m / 8.04 m / 5.10 m / 2:32.72							
4 × 400 m relay	3:02.87	Julien Watrin; Dylan Borlée; Jonathan Borlée; Kevin Borlée	Belgium	8 March 2015	2015 Prague			

=== Women ===
Event	Record	Name	Nation	Date	Venue	Notes	Ref.
60 m	7.00	Nelli Cooman	Netherlands	23 February 1986	1986 Madrid		
60 m	7.00	Mujinga Kambundji	Switzerland	3 March 2023	2023 Istanbul		
400 m	49.59	Jarmila Kratochvílová	Czechoslovakia	7 March 1982	1982 Milan		
800 m	1:55.82	Jolanda Čeplak	Slovenia	3 March 2002	2002 Vienna		
1500 m	4:02.39	Laura Muir	Great Britain	4 March 2017	2017 Belgrade		
3000 m	8:30.61	Laura Muir	Great Britain	1 March 2019	2019 Glasgow		
60 m hurdles	7.67	Ditaji Kambundji	Switzerland	7 March 2025	2025 Apeldoorn		
High jump	2.05 m	Tia Hellebaut	Belgium	3 March 2007	2007 Birmingham		
Pole vault	4.90 m	Yelena Isinbayeva	Russia	6 March 2005	2005 Madrid		
Long jump	7.30 m	Heike Drechsler	East Germany	5 March 1988	1988 Budapest		
Triple jump	15.16 m	Ashia Hansen	Great Britain	28 February 1998	1998 Valencia		
Shot put	21.46 m	Helena Fibingerová	Czechoslovakia	13 March 1977	1977 San Sebastián		
Pentathlon	5055 pts	Nafissatou Thiam	Belgium	3 March 2023	2023 Istanbul		
Pentathlon	60m H / High jump / Shot put / Long jump / 800m; 8.23 / 1.92 m / 15.54 m / 6.59 m / 2:13.60						
4 × 400 m relay	3:24.34	Lieke Klaver; Nina Franke; Cathelijn Peeters; Femke Bol	Netherlands	9 March 2025	2025 Apeldoorn		

=== Mixed ===
Event	Record	Name	Nation	Date	Championships	Place	Ref.
4 × 400 m relay	3:15.63	Nick Smidt; Eveline Saalberg; Tony van Diepen; Femke Bol	Netherlands	6 March 2025	2025 Championships	Apeldoorn, Netherlands	

=== Heptathlon disciplines ===
Event	Record	Athlete	Nation	Date	Championships	Place	Ref.
60 m	6.75	Karl Saluri	Estonia	2 March 2019	2019 Championships	Glasgow, United Kingdom	
60 m	6.75	Simon Ehammer (Note: Result doesn't count if the athlete doesn't finish his heptathlon.)	Switzerland	6 March 2021	2021 Championships	Toruń, Poland	
Long jump	8.20 m	Simon Ehammer	Switzerland	7 March 2025	2025 Championships	Apeldoorn, Netherlands	
Shot put	16.82 m	Tomáš Dvořák	Czech Republic	26 February 2000	2000 Championships	Ghent, Belgium	
High jump	2.19 m	Sander Skotheim	Norway	4 March 2023	2023 Championships	Istanbul, Turkey	
High jump	2.19 m	Sander Skotheim	Norway	7 March 2025	2025 Championships	Apeldoorn, Netherlands	
60 m hurdles	7.67	Arthur Abele	Germany	8 March 2015	2015 Championships	Prague, Czech Republic	
Pole vault	5.60 m	Alex Averbukh	Russia	1 March 1998	1998 Championships	Valencia, Spain	
1000 m	2:32.72	Sander Skotheim	Norway	8 March 2025	2025 Championships	Apeldoorn, Netherlands	

=== Pentathlon disciplines ===
Event	Record	Athlete	Nation	Date	Championships	Place	Ref.
60 m hurdles	8.09	Solène Ndama	France	1 March 2019	2019 Championships	Glasgow, United Kingdom	
High jump	1.96 m	Nafissatou Thiam	Belgium	3 March 2017	2017 Championships	Belgrade, Serbia	
High jump	1.96 m	Katarina Johnson-Thompson	Great Britain	1 March 2019	2019 Championships	Glasgow, United Kingdom	
Shot put	17.53 m	Austra Skujytė	Lithuania	4 March 2011	2011 Championships	Paris, France	
Long jump	6.89 m	Katarina Johnson-Thompson	Great Britain	6 March 2015	2015 Championships	Prague, Czech Republic	
800 m	2:07.17	Adrianna Sułek	Poland	3 March 2023	2023 Championships	Istanbul, Turkey	

=== By country ===
Nation	Male	Female	Total
Great Britain	2	3	5
Belgium	1	2	3
Norway	3	0	3
Netherlands	0	2	3
Switzerland	0	2	2
East Germany	1	1	2
Sweden	2	0	2
France	1	0	1
Germany	1	0	1
Poland	1	0	1
Turkey	1	0	1
Russia	0	1	1
Slovenia	0	1	1

== Records in defunct events ==
=== Men's events ===
Event	Record	Name	Nation	Date	Venue	Notes	Ref.
50 m	5.65	Marian Woronin	Poland	21 February 1981	1981 Grenoble		
200 m	20.36	Bruno Marie-Rose	France	22 February 1987	1987 Liévin		
50 m hurdles	6.47	Arto Bryggare	Finland	21 February 1981	1981 Grenoble		
5000 m walk	18:19.97	Giovanni De Benedictis	Italy	28 February 1992	1992 Genova		

=== Women's events ===
Event	Record	Name	Nation	Date	Venue	Notes	Ref.
50 m	6.17†	Linda Haglund	Sweden	22 February 1981	1981 Grenoble		
50 m	6.17†	Sofka Popova	Bulgaria	22 February 1981	1981 Grenoble		
50 m	6.17†	Linda Haglund	Sweden	22 February 1981	1981 Grenoble		
200 m	22.39	Marita Koch	East Germany	5 March 1983	1983 Budapest		
50 m hurdles	6.74	Zofia Bielczyk	Poland	22 February 1981	1981 Grenoble		
3000 m walk	11:49.99	Alina Ivanova	Unified Team	29 February 1992	1992 Genova		

† Haglund ran this time in the semifinals, and again with Popova in the final; the photofinish gave Popova first and Haglund second, with each woman being credited as having equalled the championship record.

== All-time medal table ==
Medal table includes 1966–2025.

Rank	Nation	Gold	Silver	Bronze	Total
1	Soviet Union	116	107	104	327
2	East Germany	87	83	58	228
3	Great Britain	78	73	57	208
4	West Germany	72	72	58	202
5	Poland	70	66	83	219
6	Russia	59	50	42	151
7	France	55	46	76	177
8	Italy	39	42	35	116
9	Spain	35	50	40	125
10	Netherlands	32	22	25	79
11	Czechoslovakia	31	32	36	99
12	Germany	30	45	46	121
13	Bulgaria	30	32	36	98
14	Romania	26	37	41	104
15	Sweden	23	29	28	80
16	Belgium	22	19	15	56
17	Hungary	17	23	20	60
18	Switzerland	17	13	13	43
19	Portugal	17	10	7	34
20	Ukraine	15	16	20	51
21	Czech Republic	14	17	22	53
22	Finland	13	9	14	36
23	Norway	13	7	9	29
24	Unified Team	12	8	7	27
25	Greece	9	17	12	38
26	Ireland	9	5	14	28
27	Belarus	8	8	10	26
28	Austria	7	9	13	29
29	Yugoslavia	6	6	13	25
30	Latvia	5	1	1	7
31	Serbia	4	2	4	10
32	Turkey	3	5	1	9
33	Estonia	3	0	3	6
34	Denmark	2	2	2	6
35	Azerbaijan	2	2	0	4
36	Slovakia	2	1	3	6
37	Serbia and Montenegro^{[a]}	2	1	2	5
38	Iceland	2	0	4	6
–	Authorised Neutral Athletes	2	0	1	3
39	Slovenia	1	7	4	12
40	Cyprus	1	2	0	3
41	Lithuania	1	1	1	3
42	Israel	1	0	1	2
43	Albania	1	0	0	1
44	Croatia	0	1	2	3
45	Bosnia and Herzegovina	0	1	0	1
46	Armenia	0	0	1	1
46	Luxembourg	0	0	1	1
46	Moldova	0	0	1	1
Totals (48 entries)		994	979	986	2,959

- ^[a] Includes medal of Dragan Perić, a Serbian athlete who competed during the Yugoslav Wars as an Independent European Participant.

== Multiple medallists ==
A total of 11 men and 12 women have won six or more medals at the competition.

- List does not include medals won in the four editions of the predecessor event, the European Indoor Games

=== Men ===
Name	Country	Years	Total	Gold	Silver	Bronze
Thomas Wessinghage	West Germany	1972–1986	12	6	5	1
Jakob Ingebrigtsen	Norway	2019–2025	8	7	1	0
Dietmar Mögenburg	West Germany	1980–1990	8	5	1	2
Valeriy Borzov	Soviet Union	1970–1977	7	7	0	0
Viktor Saneyev	Soviet Union	1970–1977	6	6	0	0
Marian Woronin	Poland	1975–1987	6	5	0	1
José Luís González	Spain	1982–1992	6	5	0	1
Roman Šebrle	Czech Republic	1998–2011	6	3	1	2
Geoff Capes	Great Britain	1971–1979	6	2	3	1
László Szalma	Hungary	1976–1990	6	2	3	1
Béla Bakosi	Hungary	1979–1988	6	2	1	3

=== Women ===
Name	Country	Years	Total	Gold	Silver	Bronze
Helena Fibingerová	Czechoslovakia	1970–1985	11	8	3	0
Marlies Göhr	East Germany	1977–1988	9	5	2	2
Nelli Fiere	Netherlands	1984–1994	8	6	0	2
Brigitte Kraus	West Germany	1976–1988	8	3	1	4
Doina Melinte	Romania	1982–1992	7	5	1	1
Heike Drechsler	East Germany & Germany	1982–2000	7	4	1	2
Grażyna Rabsztyn	Poland	1972–1982	7	2	4	1
Femke Bol	Netherlands	2021-2025	6	6	0	0
Laura Muir	Great Britain	2015–2023	6	5	0	1
Galina Chistyakova	Soviet Union	1985–1990	6	4	2	0
Marita Koch	East Germany	1977–1986	6	4	1	1
Lidia Chojecka	Poland	1998–2011	6	3	3	0
Yordanka Donkova	Bulgaria	1982–1994	6	3	0	3
Jarmila Nygrýnová	Czechoslovakia	1971–1980	6	2	3	1

== See also ==
- Greece at the European Athletics Indoor Championships
- Italy at the European Athletics Indoor Championships
