= Turkey at the 2006 European Athletics Championships =

- WA code: TUR

in Gothenburg
- Medals Ranked 30th: Gold 0 Silver 0 Bronze 1 Total 1

European Athletics Championships appearances (overview)
- 1950; 1954; 1958; 1962; 1966; 1969; 1971; 1974; 1978; 1982; 1986; 1990; 1994; 1998; 2002; 2006; 2010; 2012; 2014; 2016; 2018; 2022; 2024

Turkey sent 15 athletes, among them 8 women, to the 2006 European Athletics Championships held between August 7 and August 13, 2006 in Gothenburg, Sweden. It won 1 bronze medal. Elvan Abeylegesse won the bronze medal in the women's 5000 meter race.

== Results ==
2006 Gothenburg	Gold	Silver	Bronze	Total
Turkey (TUR)	0	0	1	1

List of Turkey's all results, including the performances in qualifications, quarter-finals and semi-finals.

Place	Athlete	Event	Result
3	Elvan Abeylegesse	5,000 m W	F: 14:59.29 SB
4	Halil Akkaş	5,000 m M	F: 13:46.53
12	Esen Kızıldağ	100 m Hurdles W	SF: 13.24
14	Gülay Kırşan Kılıç, Nevin Yanıt, Esen Kızıldağ, Saliha Memiş Özyurt	100 m Relay W	SF: 46.32
16	Recep Çelik	20 km Walk M	F: 1:27:18
16	Filiz Kadoğan	100 m Relay W	Q: 15.78
17	Tuncay Örs	400 m Hurdles M	SF: 51.14 SB
18	Selahattin Çobanlıoğlu	800 m M	R1: 1:49.07 PB
19	Eşref Apak	Hammer Throw M	Q: 70.17
23	Fatih Eryıldırım	Hammer Throw M	Q: 67.54
28	Türkan Erişmiş	3,000 m Steeplechase W	SF: 10:21.36
30	Özge Gürler	400 m Hurdles W	R1: 58.39
38	İsmail Aslan	100 m M	R1:10.71
DNF	Elvan Abeylegesse	10,000 m W	F: DNF
DNF	Nevin Yanıt	100 m Hurdles W	R1: DNF

R1: Round 1, Q: Qualification, SF: Semi-final, F: Final
DNF: Did not finish, PB: Personal best, SB: Seasonal best

== Competitors ==
=== Men ===
- 100 m: İsmail Aslan
- 800 m: Selahattin Çobanoğlu
- 5,000 m: Halil Akkaş
- 400 m Hurdles: Tuncay Örs
- 20 km Walk: Recep Çelik
- Hammer Throw: Eşref Apak, Fatih Eryıldırım

=== Women ===
- 100 m: Esen Kızıldağ, Saliha Özyurt
- 5,000 m: Elvan Abeylegesse
- 10,000 m: Elvan Abeylegesse
- 100 m Hurdles: Esen Kızıldağ, Nevin Yanıt
- 400 m Hurdles: Özge Gürler
- 4 × 100 m Relay: Gülay Kırşan Kılıç, Saliha Memiş Özyurt, Esen Kızıldağ, Nevin Yanıt
- 3,000 m Steeplechase: Türkan Erişmiş
- Shot Put: Filiz Kadoğan
