= Ataköy Athletics Arena =

Indoor sporting arena in Istanbul, Türkiye

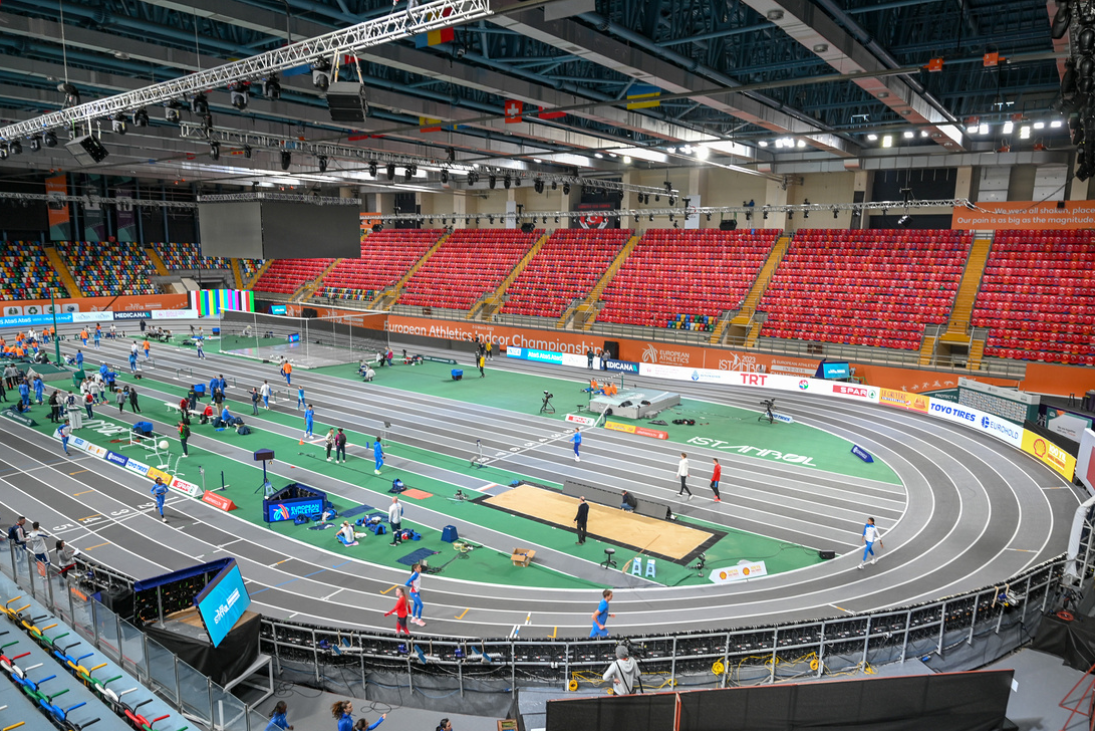
- Interactive map of Ataköy Athletics Arena
- Full name: Ataköy Atletizm Salonu
- Location: Ataköy, Bakırköy, Istanbul, Türkiye
- Coordinates: 40.98744°N 28.85558°E
- Owner: Turkish Athletic Federation
- Capacity: 7,450

Construction
- Built: September 2011
- Opened: 27 January 2012
- Cost: TL ₺ 32 million Euro 11 million

Tenant
- 2012 Balkan Indoor Championships; 2012 IAAF World Indoor Championships; 2023 European Indoor Championships

Ataköy Athletics Arena (Turkish: Ataköy Atletizm Salonu) is an indoor sporting arena for track and field athletics events located in Ataköy, Istanbul, Turkey.

== Construction ==
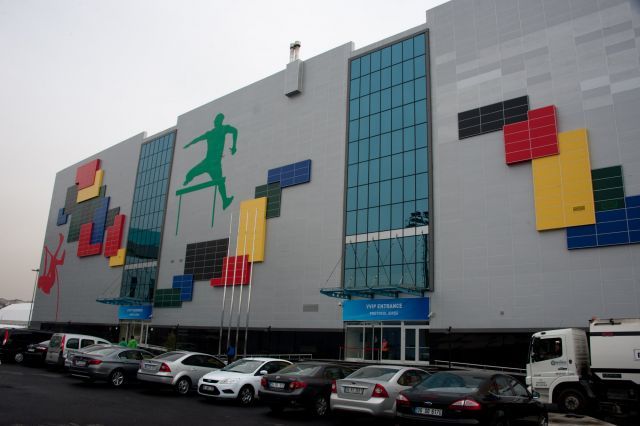
Exterior of the venue (March 2012)

The venue was built for the 2012 IAAF World Indoor Championships. It is situated next to the larger Sinan Erdem Dome which host's basketball among other sports. The arena was the first indoor athletics venue in the country.

As part of Istanbul bid for the 2020 Summer Olympics, it was the planned venue for the fencing and taekwondo events.

The building is 125 m (410 ft) long, 87 m (285 ft) wide and 27 m (89 ft) high, covering an area of 10,875 m^{2} (117,060 ft^{2}).

== Facilities ==
Ataköy Athletics Arena has a 200 m (660 ft) oval track with six lanes, a 60 m (200 ft) straight track with eight lanes for track events, and shot put, high jump, pole vault, long/triple jump sectors for field events.

It has a total seating capacity of 7,450 consisting of 5,040 spectator seats, 590 VIP seats, 206 VVIP seats, 141 seats with tables for TV commentators, 230 seats with tables for press, and 144 seats with desks for photo editors and press. In addition, there are 560 seats for team stands and 60 seats for coaches.

== Events hosted ==
Year	Tournament/Concert	Date
2012	Turkish National Indoor Championships	27–29 January
2012	Balkan Athletics Indoor Championships	18–20 February
2012	IAAF World Indoor Championships	9–11 March
2012	Sensation Turkey 'Wicked Wonderland'	13 October
2012	Jennifer Lopez	14 November
2012	Sting	26 November
2023	European Athletics Indoor Championships	2–5 March

== See also ==
- List of indoor arenas in Turkey

Preceded by Aspire Dome; Doha	IAAF World Indoor Championships in Athletics; Venue; 2012	Succeeded by Ergo Arena; Sopot
Preceded by Arena Toruń; Toruń	European Athletics Indoor Championships; Venue; 2023	Succeeded by Omnisport Apeldoorn; Apeldoorn
