= 2027 European Athletics Indoor Championships =

- Organisers: EAA
- Edition: 39th
- Dates: 4–7 March 2027
- Host city: Valencia, Spain
- Venue: Velódromo Luis Puig
- Level: Senior
- Type: Indoor
- Events: 27

The 2027 European Athletics Indoor Championships are scheduled to be held from 4 to 7 March 2027 at the Velódromo Luis Puig in Valencia, Spain. The four-day competition features thirteen men's, thirteen women's and one mixed athletics events over three morning and four afternoon sessions.

The event will be held at the Palau Velódrom Lluís Puig, which was renovated in 2023. It's the fifth time Spain will be hosting the European Indoor Championships, and the second time Valencia will be hosting the event, after 1998.

== Schedule ==
All times are local (UTC+1).

Q	Qualification	R1	Round 1	SF	Semi-finals	F	Final
M = morning session, E = evening session

Men
Date →	4 Mar	5 Mar		6 Mar			7 Mar	
Event ↓	E	M	E	M	E		M	E
60 m				R1	SF	F		
400 m	R1		SF	F				
800 m		R1			SF			F
1500 m	R1		F					
3000 m				R1			F	
60 m hurdles				R1			SF	F
4 × 400 m								F
High jump	Q			F				
Pole vault			Q					F
Long jump	Q		F					
Triple jump		Q			F			
Shot put							Q	F
Heptathlon		F						

Women
Date →	4 Mar	5 Mar		6 Mar		7 Mar		
Event ↓	E	M	E	M	E	M	E	
60 m						R1	SF	F
400 m	R1		SF	F				
800 m		R1			SF		F	
1500 m	R1		F					
3000 m				R1		F		
60 m hurdles	R1	SF	F					
4 × 400 m							F	
High jump		Q					F	
Pole vault	Q				F			
Long jump				Q		F		
Triple jump	Q		F					
Shot put				Q	F			
Pentathlon						F		

Mixed
Date →	4 Mar	5 Mar		6 Mar		7 Mar	
Event ↓	E	M	E	M	E	M	E
4 × 400 m					F		

== Medal summary ==
=== Men ===
Event	Gold	Silver	Bronze
60 metres			
400 metres			
800 metres			
1500 metres			
3000 metres			
60 metres hurdles			
4 × 400 metres relay			
High jump			
Pole vault			
Long jump			
Triple jump			
Shot put			
Heptathlon			
WR world record | AR area record | CR championship record | GR games record | NR national record | OR Olympic record | PB personal best | SB season best | WL world leading (in a given season)

=== Women ===
Event	Gold	Silver	Bronze
60 metres			
400 metres			
800 metres			
1500 metres			
3000 metres			
60 metres hurdles			
4 × 400 metres relay			
High jump			
Pole vault			
Long jump			
Triple jump			
Shot put			
Pentathlon			

=== Mixed ===
Event	Gold	Silver	Bronze
4 × 400 metres relay			
