= Ali Kaya (athlete) =

Kenyan long-distance runner who represented Turkey (b. 1994)

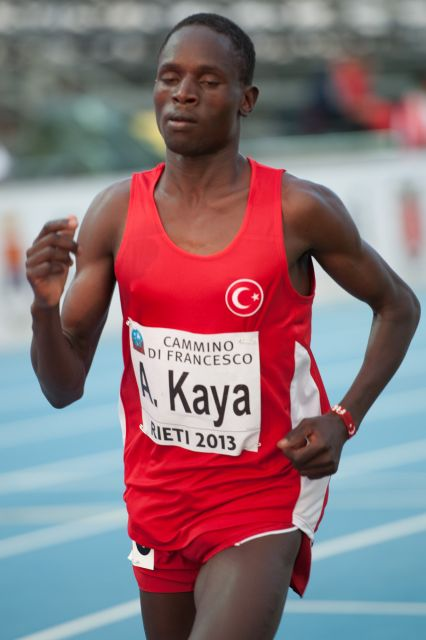
- Ali Kaya at the 2013 European Athletics Junior Championships in Rieti.

Personal information
- Nationality: Kenyan-Turkish
- Born: Stanley Kiprotich Mukche; 20 April 1994 (age 32) Eldoret, Uasin Gishu County, Kenya
- Height: 1.75 m (5 ft 9 in)
- Weight: 54 kg (119 lb)

Sport
- Country: Turkey
- Sport: Long-distance running
- Events: 5000 m, 10,000 m
- Coached by: Carol Santa
Medal record
Men's athletics
Representing Turkey
European Championships
Silver medal – second place	2016 Amsterdam	10,000 m
Bronze medal – third place	2014 Zürich	10,000 m
European Team Championships
Silver medal – second place	2017 Lille	3000 m
Gold medal – first place	2017 Lille	10,000 m
Bronze medal – third place	2014 Braunschweig	5000 m
European Indoor Championships
Gold medal – first place	2015 Prague	3000 m
European Cross Country Championships
Gold medal – first place	2015 Hyères	Individual
Silver medal – second place	2014 Samokov	Individual
Gold medal – first place	2013 Belgrade	Junior race
Islamic Solidarity Games
Gold medal – first place	2013 Palembang	10,000 m
Silver medal – second place	2013 Palembang	5000 m
Mediterranean Games
Gold medal – first place	2026 Taranto	Half marathon

Ali Kaya (born as Stanley Kiprotich Mukche on 20 April 1994) is a Kenyan long-distance runner who represented Turkey. He competed in the 5000 m and 10,000 m events and holds the 10,000 m European record for juniors, set in 2013.

== Career ==
He was born Stanley Kiprotich Mukche on 20 April 1994 in Eldoret, Uasin Gishu County, Kenya. In 2010, he moved to Turkey and adopted the Turkish name Ali Kaya. Following his naturalization in 2013, he became officially eligible to represent his new home country in international competitions on 20 June of the same year.

He won two gold medals, in the 5000 m and 10,000 m events, at the 2013 European Athletics Junior Championships held in Rieti, Italy. In the 10,000 m event, he set a new Turkish national record with a time of 28:31.16. He caused a scandal following the race when he abruptly left the championship for Kenya without showing up at the medal ceremony. Another Turkish athlete stood on the championship podium in Italy to receive his medal. According to the Turkish Athletics Federation, he travelled to Kenya in order to join a four-day training session in Kenya with his fellow countryman and naturalized Turk İlham Tanui Özbilen.

At the 2013 Islamic Solidarity Games held Palembang, Indonesia, Ali Kaya won a silver and a gold medal in the 5000-meter and 10,000-meter events, respectively.

In 2014, he competed at the European Athletics Team Championships Super League in Braunschweig, Germany, and won the bronze medal in the 5000 metres event with 13:56.64. At the European Championship in Zurich over 10.000 meters he competed against double Olympic champion Mo Farah, clinching a bronze medal after a fast finish. He became the youngest medalist ever in the European 10.000 final.

At the World Championships in Beijing 2015 he was one of only four athletes to reach the final of both the 10.000m and the 5000m. He finished 7th in 10000 m and 9th in 5000 m.

Kaya became the first Turkish person to win at the Istanbul Half Marathon in April 2016.

== International competitions ==
Year	Competition	Venue	Position	Event	Notes
2013	European Junior Championships	Rieti, Italy	1st	5000 m	13:49.76
2013	European Junior Championships	Rieti, Italy	1st	10,000 m	28:31.16 CR NJR
2013	Islamic Solidarity Games	Palembang, Indonesia	2nd	5000 m	14:04.59
2013	Islamic Solidarity Games	Palembang, Indonesia	1st	10,000 m	29:36.64
2013	European Cross Country Championships	Belgrade, Serbia	1st	Junior race	17:49
2014	European Team Championships Super League	Braunschweig, Germany	3rd	5000 m	13:56.64
2015	European Indoor Championships	Prague, Czech Republic	1st	3000 m	7:38.42 CR NR'
2015	European U23 Championships	Tallinn, Estonia	1st	5000 m	13:20.16
2015	European U23 Championships	Tallinn, Estonia	1st	10,000 m	27:53.38
2015	World Championships	Beijing, China	9th	5000 m	13:56.51
2015	World Championships	Beijing, China	7th	10,000 m	27:43.69
2015	European Cross Country Championships	Hyères, France	1st	Senior race	29:20
2015	European Cross Country Championships	Hyères, France	9th	Senior team	154 pts
2016	European Championships	Amsterdam, Netherlands	2nd	10,000 m	28:21.42
2016	Olympic Games	Rio de Janeiro, Brazil	39th (h)	5000 m	14:05.34
2016	Olympic Games	Rio de Janeiro, Brazil	–	10,000 m	DNF
2017	European Indoor Championships	Belgrade, Serbia	9th	3000 m	8:08.92
2017	Islamic Solidarity Games	Baku, Azerbaijan	5th	5000 m	13:30.24
2017	Islamic Solidarity Games	Baku, Azerbaijan	4th	10,000 m	27:54.41
2017	European Team Championships	Lille, France	2nd	3000 m	7:59.54
2017	European Team Championships	Lille, France	1st	10,000 m	13:36.75 CR
2026	Mediterranean Games	Taranto, Italy	1st	Half marathon	1:02:06
