= List of Turkish records in athletics =

The following are the national records in athletics in Turkey maintained by Turkey's national athletics federation: Türkiye Atletizm Federasyonu (TAF).

== Outdoor ==
Key to tables: Awaiting ratification Record not kept by TAF Not ratified or later rescinded by TAF

=== Men ===
| Event | Record | Athlete | Date | Meet | Place | Ref. |
|---|---|---|---|---|---|---|
| 100 m | 9.92 A (+0.9 m/s) | Jak Ali Harvey | 12 June 2016 | 2nd International Sprint And Relay Challenge | Erzurum, Turkey | |
| 100 m | 9.9 h NWI | Ramil Guliyev | 6 June 2017 | Clubs Super League | Ankara, Turkey | |
| 150 m | 15.38 (+0.5 m/s) | Ramil Guliyev | 8 September 2020 | Golden Spike Ostrava | Ostrava, Czech Republic | |
| 200 m | 19.76 (+0.7 m/s) | Ramil Guliyev | 9 August 2018 | European Championships | Berlin, Germany | |
| 300 m | 32.46 | Sinan Ören | 18 July 2020 | | Ankara, Turkey | |
| 400 m | 45.51 | Yavuz Can | 7 July 2016 | European Championships | Amsterdam, Netherlands | |
| 600 m | 1:16.70 | Salih Teksöz | 19 June 2024 | Meeting International de la Province de Liège | Liège, Belgium | |
| 600 m | 1:15.35 | Ömer Faruk Bozdağ | 3 May 2026 | ESET WMD-Night | Busto Arsizio, Italy | |
| 800 m | 1:44.00 | Ilham Tanui Özbilen | 29 June 2013 | Mediterranean Games | Mersin, Turkey | |
| 1000 m | 2:15.08 | Ilham Tanui Özbilen | 17 June 2014 | Golden Spike Ostrava | Ostrava, Czech Republic | |
| 1500 m | 3:31.30 | Ilham Tanui Özbilen | 19 July 2013 | Herculis | Fontvieille, Monaco | |
| Mile | 3:51.71 | Ilham Tanui Özbilen | 11 June 2014 | Bislett Games | Oslo, Norway | |
| 2000 m | 5:01.29 | Halil Akkaş | 3 June 2007 | | Istanbul, Turkey | |
| 3000 m | 7:38.65 | Ali Kaya | 17 July 2015 | Herculis | Fontvieille, Monaco | |
| 5000 m | 13:00.31 | Ali Kaya | 4 June 2015 | Golden Gala | Rome, Italy | |
| 5 km (road) | 14:10+ | Kaan Kigen Özbilen | 8 April 2018 | Istanbul Half Marathon | Istanbul, Turkey | |
| 10,000 m | 27:24.09 | Ali Kaya | 2 May 2015 | Turkish Championships | Mersin, Turkey | |
| 10 km (road) | 29:04 | Bekir Karayel | 26 October 2013 | | İzmit, Turkey | |
| 10 km (road) | 28:29 | Paul Kemboi | 9 March 2014 | | Taroudant, Morocco | |
| 10 km (road) | 28:09+ | Kaan Kigen Özbilen | 8 April 2018 | Istanbul Half Marathon | Istanbul, Turkey | |
| 15 km (road) | 42:16+ | Kaan Kigen Özbilen | 8 April 2018 | Istanbul Half Marathon | Istanbul, Turkey | |
| 15 km (road) | 42:16+ | Kaan Kigen Özbilen | 8 February 2019 | RAK Half Marathon | Ras Al Khaimah, United Arab Emirates | |
| 20 km (road) | 56:42+ | Kaan Kigen Özbilen | 8 February 2019 | RAK Half Marathon | Ras Al Khaimah, United Arab Emirates | |
| Half marathon | 59:48 | Kaan Kigen Özbilen | 8 February 2019 | RAK Half Marathon | Ras Al Khaimah, United Arab Emirates | |
| 25 km (road) | 1:13:34+ | Kaan Kigen Özbilen | 1 December 2019 | Valencia Marathon | Valencia, Spain | |
| 30 km (road) | 1:28:19+ | Kaan Kigen Özbilen | 1 December 2019 | Valencia Marathon | Valencia, Spain | |
| Marathon | 2:04:16 | Kaan Kigen Özbilen | 1 December 2019 | Valencia Marathon | Valencia, Spain | |
| 110 m hurdles | 13.42 (+1.8 m/s) | Mikdat Sevler | 5 June 2021 | Turkish Championships | Bursa, Turkey | |
| 300 m hurdles | 34.50 | Berke Akçam | 26 April 2025 | Xiamen Diamond League | Xiamen, China | |
| 400 m hurdles | 47.81 | Yasmani Copello | 9 August 2018 | European Championships | Berlin, Germany | |
| 400 m hurdles | 47.81 | Yasmani Copello | 3 August 2021 | Olympic Games | Tokyo, Japan | |
| 2000 m steeplechase | 6:05.55 | Abdullah Yildiz | 27 April 2019 | Spor Toto Kulüpler arası U18 Ligi 1.Kademe Yarışmaları | Antalya, Turkey | |
| 3000 m steeplechase | 8:17.85 | Tarik Langat Akdag | 3 August 2012 | Olympic Games | London, United Kingdom | |
| 3000 m steeplechase | 8:13.14 | Tarik Langat Akdag | 8 July 2011 | | Saint-Denis, France | |
| High jump | 2.31 m | Enes Talha Şenses | 22 June 2022 | Orhan Altan Anı Yarışması | Ankara, Turkey | |
| Pole vault | 5.92 m | Ersu Şaşma | 27 July 2025 | ISTAF Berlin | Berlin, Germany | |
| Long jump | 8.08 m (+0.8 m/s) | Mesut Yavaş | 24 June 2000 | | Istanbul, Turkey | |
| Triple jump | 17.37 m (+1.1 m/s) | Necati Er | 14 July 2019 | European U23 Championships | Gävle, Sweden | |
| Shot put | 20.42 m | Hüseyin Atıcı | 5 June 2012 | Turkish Super League | Ankara, Turkey | |
| Discus throw | 67.50 m | Ercüment Olgundeniz | 27 May 2012 | European Champion Clubs Cup | Vila Real de Santo António, Portugal | |
| Hammer throw | 81.45 m | Eşref Apak | 4 June 2005 | | Istanbul, Turkey | |
| Javelin throw | 85.60 m | Fatih Avan | 20 May 2012 | Turkish Super League | İzmir, Turkey | |
| Decathlon | 7757 pts h | Alper Kasapoğlu | 18–19 April 1996 | | Azusa, United States | |
| Decathlon | 100m (wind) / Long jump (wind) / Shot put / High jump / 400m / 110m H (wind) / Discus / Pole vault / Javelin / 1500m; 10.70 / 7.57 m w / 14.10 m / 1.95 m / 50.31 / 14.37w / 40.32 m / 4.80 m / 47.30 m / 4:46.04 | | | | | |
| Decathlon | 7818 pts (Note: wind-assisted under the rules of the day) | Alper Kasapoğlu | 23–24 May 1996 | | Marietta, United States | |
| Decathlon | 100m (wind) / Long jump (wind) / Shot put / High jump / 400m / 110m H (wind) / Discus / Pole vault / Javelin / 1500m | | | | | |
| 5000 m walk (track) | 19:30.79 | Salih Korkmaz | 29 August 2020 | | Bursa, Turkey | |
| 10,000 m walk (track) | 39:26.92 | Salih Korkmaz | 5 September 2020 | | Istanbul, Turkey | |
| 10 km walk (road) | 39:20+ | Salih Korkmaz | 16 February 2020 | | Antalya, Turkey | |
| 10 km walk (road) | 39:11+ | Salih Korkmaz | 6 March 2021 | Turkish Open Walking Championships | Antalya, Turkey | |
| 15 km walk (road) | 1:01:43+ | Ersin Tacir | 9 April 2016 | Poděbrady Walking Race | Poděbrady, Czech Republic | |
| 20,000 m walk (track) | 1:23:45 | Recep Çelik | 7 May 2011 | | Faro, Portugal | |
| 20 km walk (road) | 1:18:42 | Salih Korkmaz | 6 March 2021 | Turkish Open Walking Championships | Antalya, Turkey | |
| 50 km walk (road) | 4:44:46 | Ozan Pamuk | 8 May 2016 | World Race Walking Team Championships | Rome, Italia | |
| 4 × 100 m relay | 37.98 | Turkey; Emre Zafer Barnes; Jak Ali Harvey; Yiğitcan Hekimoğlu; Ramil Guliyev | 12 August 2018 | European Championships | Berlin, Germany | |
| 4 × 200 m relay | 1:23.55 | Turkey; Yavuz Can; Ramil Guliyev; Fatih Aktas; Ali Ekber Kayas | 3 May 2015 | IAAF World Relays | Nassau, Bahamas | |
| 4 × 400 m relay | 3:02.22 A | Turkey; Halit Kılıç; Yasmani Copello; Batuhan Altıntaş; Yavuz Can | 12 June 2016 | 2nd International Sprint And Relay Challenge | Erzurum, Turkey | |

=== Women ===
| Event | Record | Athlete | Date | Meet | Place | Ref. |
|---|---|---|---|---|---|---|
| 100 m | 11.25 (+1.6 m/s) | Nora Güner | 11 September 2001 | Mediterranean Games | Radès, Tunisia | |
| 200 m | 22.71 (−0.3 m/s) | Nora Güner | 12 May 2002 | | İzmir, Turkey | |
| 300 m | 36.87 | Nora Güner | 5 May 2002 | | Istanbul, Turkey | |
| 400 m | 52.15 | Birsen Engin | 30 July 2011 | | Ankara, Turkey | |
| 400 m | 51.53 | Pınar Saka | 30 July 2011 | Turkish Super League Final | Ankara, Turkey | |
| 800 m | 2:00.23 | Merve Aydın | 12 June 2012 | Olympic Champions Prizes | Minsk, Belarus | |
| 1000 m | 2:39.92 | Yeliz Kurt | 6 June 2009 | | Istanbul, Turkey | |
| 1500 m | 3:55.33 | Süreyya Ayhan | 5 September 2003 | Memorial Van Damme | Brussels, Belgium | |
| Mile | 4:31.28 | Esma Aydemir | 2 June 2012 | Yılmaz Sazak Memorial | Istanbul, Turkey | |
| Mile (road) | 4:41.46 | Emine Hatun Mechaal | 27 April 2024 | Adizero: Road to Records | Herzogenaurach, Germany | |
| 2000 m | 5:33.83 | Elvan Abeylegesse | 7 June 2003 | | Istanbul, Turkey | |
| 3000 m | 8:31.94 | Elvan Abeylegesse | 30 August 2002 | Memorial Van Damme | Brussels, Belgium | |
| 5000 m | 14:24.68 | Elvan Abeylegesse | 11 June 2004 | | Bergen, Norway | |
| 5 km (road) | 15:20+ Wo | Yasemin Can | 17 October 2020 | World Half Marathon Championships | Gdynia, Poland | |
| 10,000 m | 30:21.67 | Elvan Abeylegesse | 15 April 2006 | | Antalya, Turkey | |
| 10,000 m | 29:56.34 X | Elvan Abeylegesse | 15 August 2008 | Olympic Games | Beijing, China | |
| 10 km (road) | 30:47+ Wo | Yasemin Can | 17 October 2020 | World Half Marathon Championships | Gdynia, Poland | |
| 15 km (road) | 46:24+ Wo | Yasemin Can | 17 October 2020 | World Half Marathon Championships | Gdynia, Poland | |
| 15 km (road) | 46:05+ Mx | Nevin Can | 23 August 2026 | 21K Buenos Aires | Buenos Aires, Argentina | |
| 20 km (road) | 1:02:40+ Wo | Yasemin Can | 17 October 2020 | World Half Marathon Championships | Gdynia, Poland | |
| 20 km (road) | 1:01:42+ Mx | Nevin Can | 23 August 2026 | 21K Buenos Aires | Buenos Aires, Argentina | |
| Half marathon | 1:06:20 Wo | Yasemin Can | 17 October 2020 | World Half Marathon Championships | Gdynia, Poland | |
| Half marathon | 1:05:06 Mx | Nevin Can | 23 August 2026 | 21K Buenos Aires | Buenos Aires, Argentina | |
| 25 km (road) | 1:23:27+ | Sultan Haydar | 15 April 2012 | Paris Marathon | Paris, France | |
| 30 km (road) | 1:40:07+ | Sultan Haydar | 15 April 2012 | Paris Marathon | Paris, France | |
| Marathon | 2:24:44 | Sultan Haydar | 23 January 2015 | Dubai Marathon | Dubai, United Arab Emirates | |
| Marathon | 2:21:27 | Sultan Haydar | 3 December 2023 | Valencia Marathon | Valencia, Spain | |
| 100 m hurdles | 12.63 | Nevin Yanıt | 31 October 2010 | European Championships | Barcelona, Spain | |
| 100 m hurdles | 12.58 (+0.6 m/s) X | Nevin Yanıt | 7 August 2012 | Olympic Games | London, United Kingdom | |
| 100 m hurdles | 12.58 (−0.2 m/s) X | Nevin Yanıt | 7 August 2012 | Olympic Games | London, United Kingdom | |
| 400 m hurdles | 55.09 | Nagihan Karadere | 31 July 2011 | Turkish Super League Final | Ankara, Turkey | |
| 2000 m steeplechase | 6:16.79 | Sümeyye Erol | 10 September 2023 | Hanžeković Memorial | Zagreb, Croatia | |
| 3000 m steeplechase | 9:13.53 | Gülcan Mıngır | 9 June 2012 | International Athletics Meeting Pavel Pavlov | Sofia, Bulgaria | |
| High jump | 1.94 m | Burcu Ayhan | 16 July 2011 | European U23 Championships | Ostrava, Czech Republic | |
| Pole vault | 4.40 m | Buse Arıkazan | 19 June 2019 | | Istanbul, Turkey | |
| Long jump | 6.87 m (+1.7 m/s) | Karin Melis Mey | 1 August 2009 | | Leverkusen, Germany | |
| Long jump | 6.93 m (+1.6 m/s) | Karin Melis Mey | 7 July 2007 | | Bad Langensalza, Germany | |
| Long jump | 6.93 m (+0.6 m/s) | Karin Melis Mey | 7 June 2008 | | Bad Langensalza, Germany | |
| Triple jump | 14.16 m (−0.2 m/s) | Tuğba Danışmaz | 24 June 2023 | European Team Championships | Chorzów, Poland | |
| Shot put | 18.57 m | Emel Dereli | 6 May 2016 | Qatar Athletic Super Grand Prix | Doha, Qatar | |
| Discus throw | 64.25 m | Oksana Mert | 30 May 1999 | | Krasnodar, Russia | |
| Hammer throw | 74.17 m | Tuğçe Şahutoğlu | 19 May 2012 | Turkish Super League | İzmir, Turkey | |
| Javelin throw | 67.21 m | Eda Tuğsuz | 18 May 2017 | Islamic Solidarity Games | Baku, Azerbaijan | |
| Heptathlon | 6076 pts | Anzhela Kinet | 3–4 June 2000 | Hypo-Meeting | Götzis, Austria | |
| Heptathlon | 100m H (wind) / High jump / Shot put / 200m (wind) / Long jump (wind) / Javelin / 800m; 13.56 / 1.76 m / 13.25 m / 24.07 / 6.14 m / 39.11 m / 2:18.35 | | | | | |
| Heptathlon | 6078 pts (Note: wind-assisted under the rules of the day (though not necessarily under current rules)) | Anzhela Kinet | 5–6 June 2004 | | Arles, France | |
| Heptathlon | 100m H (wind) / High jump / Shot put / 200m (wind) / Long jump (wind) / Javelin / 800m | | | | | |
| 5000 m walk (track) | 21:35.87 | Meryem Bekmez | 25 May 2019 | | Ankara, Turkey | |
| 5 km walk (road) | 22:13+ | Meryem Bekmez | 11 August 2018 | European Championships | Berlin, Germany | |
| 10,000 m walk (track) | 44:17.69 | Meryem Bekmez | 14 July 2018 | World U20 Championships | Tampere, Finland | |
| 10 km walk (road) | 43:23 | Meryem Bekmez | 6 March 2021 | Turkish Open Walking Championships | Antalya, Turkey | |
| 20,000 m walk (track) | 1:44:16 | Semiha Mutlu | 31 July 2011 | | Ankara, Turkey | |
| 20 km walk (road) | 1:28:48 | Meryem Bekmez | 27 March 2021 | Balkan Race Walking Championships | Antalya, Turkey | |
| Marathon walk (road) | 3:43:29 | Ayse Aslan | 15 August 2026 | European Championships | Birmingham, United Kingdom | |
| 4 × 100 m relay | 44.38 | Turkey; Büşra Akay; Sila Koloğlu; Simay Özçiftçi; Beyzanur Seylan | 26 July 2025 | Summer World University Games | Wattenscheid, Germany | |
| 4 × 400 m relay | 3:33.11 | Sema Apak; Birsen Engin; Merve Aydın; Meliz Redif | 19 June 2011 | European Team Championships 1st League | İzmir, Turkey | |
| 4 × 400 m relay | 3:29.40 | Turkey; Birsen Engin; Merve Aydın; Meliz Redif; Pınar Saka | 19 June 2011 | European Team Championships 1st League | İzmir, Turkey | |

=== Mixed ===
| Event | Record | Athlete | Date | Meet | Place | Ref. |
|---|---|---|---|---|---|---|
| 4 × 400 m relay | 3:17.65 A | Turkey; Akçam Berke; Yıldırım Büşra; Polat Elif; Çanakcı İlyas | 13 June 2021 | International Sprint & Relay Cup | Erzurum, Turkey | |

== Indoor ==
=== Men ===
| Event | Record | Athlete | Date | Meet | Place | Ref. |
|---|---|---|---|---|---|---|
| 50 m | 5.70 | Erol Mutlusoy | 4 February 2001 | | İzmir, Turkey | |
| 60 m | 6.55 | Emre Zafer Barnes | 18 February 2018 | Istanbul Cup | Istanbul, Turkey | |
| 60 m | 6.55 | Emre Zafer Barnes | 10 February 2019 | Metz Moselle Athlelor | Metz, France | |
| 60 m | 6.4 h | Erol Mutlusoy | 14 January 2001 | | Istanbul, Turkey | |
| 200 m | 20.94 | Oğuz Uyar | 15 February 2025 | Jarvis Scott | Lubbock, United States | |
| 200 m | 20.81 A | Oğuz Uyar | 30 January 2025 | New Mexico Team Open | Albuquerque, United States | |
| 300 m | 32.80 | Berke Akçam | 7 January 2024 | | Bursa, Turkey | |
| 400 m | 46.20 | Yavuz Can | 25 February 2016 | | Istanbul, Turkey | |
| 600 m | 1:15.68 | Kerem Ayhan | 6 December 2025 | BU Sharon Colyear-Danville Season Opener | Boston, United States | |
| 800 m | 1:47.90 | Mehmet Çelik | 10 February 2023 | TTU Jarvis Scott Open | Lubbock, United States | |
| 1500 m | 3:34.76 | Ilham Tanui Özbilen | 12 February 2012 | BW-Bank Meeting | Karlsruhe, Germany | |
| Mile | 4:00.17 | Mevlüt Aras | 27 December 2025 | Selahattin Yildiz Cup | Istanbul, Turkey | |
| 2000 m | 5:05.85 | Halil Akkaş | 3 March 2006 | Meeting Pas de Calais | Liévin, France | |
| 3000 m | 7:38.42 (Note: outdoor mark ratified as absolute record) | Ali Kaya | 7 March 2015 | European Championships | Prague, Czech Republic | |
| 5000 m | 13:12.55 | Polat Kemboi Arıkan | 10 February 2012 | PSD Bank Meeting | Düsseldorf, Germany | |
| 50 m hurdles | 6.61 | Mikdat Sevler | 30 January 2021 | | Istanbul, Turkey | |
| 60 m hurdles | 7.70 | Mikdat Sevler | 20 March 2022 | World Championships | Belgrade, Serbia | |
| High jump | 2.26 m | Alperen Acet | 16 February 2019 | Balkan Championships | Istanbul, Turkey | |
| Pole vault | 5.90 m | Ersu Şaşma | 13 February 2025 | Meeting Hauts-de-France Pas-de-Calais | Liévin, France | |
| Pole vault | 5.90 m | Ersu Şaşma | 15 February 2025 | Perche en Or pole vault meeting | Roubaix, France | |
| Long jump | 8.09 m | Mesut Yavaş | 3 March 2000 | | Ames, United States | |
| Triple jump | 16.62 m | Can Ozupek | 3 February 2019 | Turkish Championships | Istanbul, Turkey | |
| Shot put | 19.59 m | Hüseyin Atıcı | 28 February 2013 | European Championships | Gothenburg, Sweden | |
| Heptathlon | 5578 pts | İlkay Aydemir | 30–31 January 2021 | | Istanbul, Turkey | |
| Heptathlon | 60m / Long jump / Shot put / High jump / 60m H / Pole vault / 1000m; 7.06 / 7.24 m / 11.10 m / 1.98 m / 8.42 / 5.20 m / 3:00.59 | | | | | |
| Heptathlon | 5612 pts | Alper Kasapoğlu | 1–2 February 1997 | | Monmouth, United Kingdom | |
| Heptathlon | 60m / Long jump / Shot put / High jump / 60m H / Pole vault / 1000m; 7.19 / 7.00 m / 13.07 m / 1.88 m / 8.13 / 4.46 m / 2:50.72 | | | | | |
| 3000 m walk | 11:30.29+ | Şahin Şenoduncu | 11 January 2020 | Turkish Championships | Istanbul, Turkey | |
| 5000 m walk | 19:13.59 | Salih Korkmaz | 11 January 2020 | Turkish Championships | Istanbul, Turkey | |
| 4 × 200 m relay | 1:29.93 | Cafer Güneş; Oğuzhan Kaya; Uğur Günaydın; Mustafa Sadıkoğlu | 22 December 2018 | | Istanbul, Turkey | |
| 4 × 400 m relay | 3:09.41 | Turkey; Oğuzhan Kaya; Berke Akçam; Kubilay Ençü; Ismail Nezir | 5 March 2023 | European Championships | Istanbul, Turkey | |

=== Women ===
| Event | Record | Athlete | Date | Meet | Place | Ref. |
|---|---|---|---|---|---|---|
| 50 m | 6.21 | Aksel Gürcan | 4 February 2001 | | İzmir, Turkey | |
| 60 m | 7.21 | Nora Güner | 27 January 2001 | BW-Bank Meeting | Karlsruhe, Germany | |
| 200 m | 23.05 | Nora Güner | 28 January 2003 | | Vienna, Austria | |
| 200 m | 23.05 | Nora Güner | 9 February 2003 | Indoor Flanders Meeting | Ghent, Belgium | |
| 300 m | 38.20 | Elif Polat | 14 March 2023 | Turkish Championships | Istanbul, Turkey | |
| 400 m | 53.04 | Pinar Saka | 7 February 2009 | | Lincoln, United States | |
| 400 m | 53.04 | Meliz Redif | 29 January 2011 | | Karlsruhe, Germany | |
| 400 m | 52.99 | Pinar Saka | 11 February 2011 | Lafayette/Rider Winter Games | New York City, United States | |
| 600 m | 1:33.88 | Eda Tulum | 17 December 2023 | | Bursa, Turkey | |
| 800 m | 2:01.19 | Merve Aydın | 9 March 2012 | World Championships | Istanbul, Turkey | |
| 1500 m | 4:05.66+ | Şilan Ayyildiz | 15 February 2025 | BU David Hemery Valentine Invitational | Boston, United States | |
| Mile | 4:23.46 | Şilan Ayyildiz | 15 February 2025 | BU David Hemery Valentine Invitational | Boston, United States | |
| 2000 m | 5:48.67 | Ebru Kavaklıoğlu | 13 February 2000 | | Liévin, France | |
| 3000 m | 8:43.46 | Yasemin Can | 5 March 2017 | European Championships | Belgrade, Serbia | |
| 3000 m | 8:42.29 | Şilan Ayyildiz | 24 January 2026 | New Balance Indoor Grand Prix | Boston, United States | |
| 5000 m | 14:46.44 | Alemitu Bekele Degfa | 10 February 2010 | GE Galan | Stockholm, Sweden | |
| 50 m hurdles | 7.12 | Özge Soylu | 29 February 2020 | | Istanbul, Turkey | |
| 60 m hurdles | 8.00 | Nevin Yanıt | 18 February 2007 | | Ghent, Belgium | |
| 60 m hurdles | 7.89 X | Nevin Yanıt | 1 March 2013 | European Championships | Gothenburg, Sweden | |
| High jump | 1.91 m | Buse Savaşkan | 26 January 2024 | | Wuppertal, Germany | |
| Pole vault | 4.43 m | Buse Arikazan | 4 February 2023 | | Bursa, Turkey | |
| Long jump | 6.66 m | Karin Melis Mey | 18 February 2012 | Aviva Indoor Grand Prix | Birmingham, United Kingdom | |
| Long jump | 6.68 m | Mirela Renda | 12 February 2000 | | Ploieşti, Romania | |
| Triple jump | 14.31 m | Tuğba Danişmaz | 4 March 2023 | European Championships | Istanbul, Turkey | |
| Shot put | 18.36 m | Emel Dereli | 25 February 2016 | | Istanbul, Turkey | |
| Pentathlon | 4577 pts | Anzhela Kinet | 25 January 2001 | | Gomel, Belarus | |
| Pentathlon | 60m H / High jump / Shot put / Long jump / 800m; 8.26 / 1.78 m / 13.31 m / 6.44 m / 2:20.39 | | | | | |
| 3000 m walk | 12:31.08 | Meryem Bekmez | 11 January 2020 | Turkish Championships | Istanbul, Turkey | |
| 5000 m walk | 21:00.97 | Ayşe Tekdal | 17 January 2021 | Turkish Walking Championships | Istanbul, Turkey | |
| 4 × 200 m relay | 1:40.85 | Rabia Çiçek; Emel Şanlı; Berfe Sancak; Nimet Karakuş | 26 December 2015 | | Istanbul, Turkey | |
| 4 × 400 m relay | 3:37.37 | Turkey; Pınar Saka; Özge Gürler; Meliz Redif; Yeliz Kurt | 8 March 2009 | European Championships | Turin, Italy | |
