= 2016 European Athletics Championships – Men's 10,000 metres =

Men's 10,000 metres at the 2016 European Athletics Championships
- Venue: Olympic Stadium
- Location: Amsterdam
- Dates: July 9 (final)
- Competitors: 12 from 7 nations
- Winning time: 28:18.52

Medalists
gold medal	Polat Kemboi Arıkan	Turkey
silver medal	Ali Kaya	Turkey
bronze medal	Antonio Abadía	Spain

The men's 10,000 metres at the 2016 European Athletics Championships were held at the Olympic Stadium on 8 July.

== Records ==
Standing records prior to the 2016 European Athletics Championships
World record	Kenenisa Bekele (ETH)	26:17.53	Brussels, Belgium	26 August 2005
European record	Mo Farah (GBR)	26:46.57	Eugene, United States	3 June 2011
Championship record	Martti Vainio (FIN)	27:30.99	Prague, Czechoslovakia	29 August 1978
World Leading	Mo Farah (GBR)	26:53.71	Eugene, United States	27 May 2016
European Leading	Mo Farah (GBR)	26:53.71	Eugene, United States	27 May 2016

== Schedule ==
Date	Time	Round
8 July 2016	20:45	Final

All times are local times (UTC+2)

== Results ==
=== Final ===
Rank	Name	Nationality	Time	Note
1st place, gold medalist(s)	Polat Kemboi Arikan	Turkey	28:18.52	
2nd place, silver medalist(s)	Ali Kaya	Turkey	28:21.42	
3rd place, bronze medalist(s)	Antonio Abadía	Spain	28:26.07	
4	Dmytro Lashyn	Ukraine	28:27.90	PB
5	Dewi Griffiths	Great Britain	28:28.55	PB
6	Juan Antonio Pérez	Spain	28:37.42	
7	Daniel Mateo	Spain	28:43.03	PB
8	Soufiane Bouchikhi	Belgium	29:03.74	
9	Ahmed El Mazoury	Italy	29:29.36	
	Aimeru Alemya	Israel	DNF	
	Girmaw Amare	Israel	DQ	
	Andy Vernon	Great Britain	DNS	
