= Polat Kemboi Arıkan =

Kenyan-Turkish long-distance runner

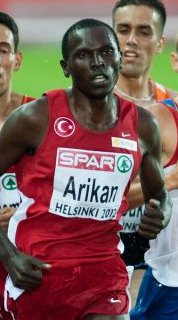
- Arıkan in 2012

Personal information
- Nationality: Turkish
- Born: Paul Kipkosgei Kemboi; 12 December 1990 (age 35) Cheptiret, Kenya
- Height: 1.70 m (5 ft 7 in)
- Weight: 60 kg (132 lb)

Sport
- Sport: Long distance
- Club: Enkaspor

Achievements and titles
- Personal bests: 3000 m indoor: 7:42:49 NR (2012); 5000 m: 13:05.98 NR (2011); 5000 m indoor: 13:12.55 NR (2012); 10000 m: 27:35.50 (2016)
Medal record
Men's athletics
Representing Turkey
European Championships
Gold medal – first place	2016 Amsterdam	10,000 m
Gold medal – first place	2012 Helsinki	10,000 m
Bronze medal – third place	2012 Helsinki	5000 m
European Cross Country Championships
Gold medal – first place	2014 Samokov	Individual
Silver medal – second place	2013 Belgrade	Individual
Mediterranean Games
Gold medal – first place	2013 Mersin	10,000 m

Polat Kemboi Arıkan (born 12 December 1990 in Cheptiret, Kenya) is a Turkish long-distance runner of Kenyan origin competing in the 3000 m and 5000 m events. The 1.70 m (5.6 ft) tall athlete, weighing 60 kg (130 lb), is a member of Enkaspor in the city of Istanbul.

== Turkish citizenship ==
He switched allegiance to Turkey on 8 June 2011, changing his name from Paul Kipkosgei Kemboi to Polat Kemboi Arıkan. Normally, he would have to wait for two years following his naturalization to be able to represent his adoptive country internationally, however, it was announced in February 2012 that he had received permission from the International Association of Athletics Federations (IAAF) to compete for Turkey starting with the 2012 World Indoor Championships in Istanbul.

== Achievements ==
Arıkan took part in the 5000 m event at the 2011 Memorial Van Damme Diamond League meeting in Brussels, Belgium setting a new Turkish national record with a time of 13:05.98; the record was previously held by Mert Girmalegese with a time of 13:26.14. Running this time entitled him to participate at the 2012 Olympic Games in London.

He is the indoor 3000 m and 5000 m national record holder with times of 7:42.49 for the 3000 m set in 2012 at the Balkan Championships in Istanbul and 13:12.55 for the 5000 m set at 2012 PSD Bank Meeting in Düsseldorf, Germany.

In 2012, he also won the 10,000m European Cup in Bilbao, setting a new personal best in the event. That year, he won the European 10,000 m title also. At the same European Championships, he also won the bronze medal in the 5,000 m. At the 2013 Mediterranean Games held in Mersin, Turkey, he became gold medalist in the 10,000 m event.

In 2016, he won the European 10,000 m title again, and set a new personal best in the 10000 m at the 2016 Summer Olympics.

In 2019, he competed in the men's marathon at the 2019 World Athletics Championships held in Doha, Qatar. He did not finish his race.
