= Turkish Athletic Federation =

National governing body for athletics in Turkey

- Sport: Athletics
- Abbreviation: TAF
- Founded: 1922
- Affiliation: World Athletics
- Regional affiliation: EAA
- Headquarters: Balgat, Ankara, Turkey
- Location: 39°56′24.34″N 32°50′44.45″E
- President: Ahmet Karadağ
- Secretary: Tekin Yaman

Official website
- taf.org.tr
- (Turkey)

The Turkish Athletic Federation (Turkish: Türkiye Atletizm Federasyonu, TAF) is the governing body for athletics in Turkey.

== Events ==
=== National ===
- Turkish Athletics Championships
- Istanbul Marathon
- Istanbul Half Marathon

=== Balkan ===
- Balkan Athletics
- Balkan Athletics Championships
- Balkan Athletics Indoor Championships
- Balkan Athletics U20 Championships
- Balkan Masters Athletics Championships

=== Euro ===
- European Athletic Association
- European Athletics Championships
- European Athletics Indoor Championships
- European Athletics U23 Championships
- European Athletics U20 Championships
- European Athletics U18 Championships
- European Team Championships
- European Throwing Cup
- European Cross Country Championships
- European Masters Athletics Championships
- Athletics at the European Youth Summer Olympic Festival

=== World ===
- World Athletics
- World Athletics Championships
- World Athletics Indoor Championships
- World Athletics Cross Country Championships
- World Athletics U20 Championships
- IAAF World U18 Championships in Athletics
- World Masters Athletics Championships

=== Islamic ===
- Athletics at the Islamic Solidarity Games

=== Mediterranean ===
- Athletics at the Mediterranean Games
- Mediterranean Athletics U23 Championships

== Records ==
- List of Turkish records in athletics

== See also ==
- List of naturalized sportspeople of Turkey national athletics teams
