= 2016 African Championships in Athletics – Men's 200 metres =

Athletic event

The men's 200 metres event at the 2016 African Championships in Athletics was held on 25 and 26 June in Kings Park Stadium.

== Medalists ==
Gold	Silver	Bronze
Wayde van Niekerk; South Africa	Adama Jammeh; Gambia	Emmanuel Matadi; Liberia

== Results ==
=== Heats ===
Qualification: First 3 of each heat (Q) and the next 3 fastest (q) qualified for the semifinals.

Wind:
Heat 1: +0.5 m/s, Heat 2: +0.6 m/s, Heat 3: +1.3 m/s, Heat 4: +0.1 m/s, Heat 5: 0.0 m/s, Heat 6: +1.2 m/s, Heat 7: +0.1 m/s

Rank	Heat	Name	Nationality	Time	Notes
1	4	Wayde van Niekerk	South Africa	20.34	Q
2	7	Emmanuel Matadi	Liberia	20.68	Q
3	5	Sydney Siame	Zambia	20.74	Q
4	2	Adama Jammeh	Gambia	20.84	Q
5	5	Clarence Munyai	South Africa	20.87	Q
6	4	Divine Oduduru	Nigeria	20.90	Q
7	1	Sibusiso Matsenjwa	Swaziland	21.08	Q
8	7	Fode Sissoko	Mali	21.10	Q
9	1	Ahmed Ali	Sudan	21.12	Q
9	6	Gabriel Mvumvure	Zimbabwe	21.12	Q
11	1	Martin Owusu-Antwi	Ghana	21.18	Q
12	2	Christopher Naliali	Ivory Coast	21.19	Q
13	6	Peter Mwai	Kenya	21.20	Q
14	6	Mangar Chep	South Sudan	21.20	Q
15	3	Emmanuel Dasor	Ghana	21.36	Q
16	6	Skander Djamil Athmani	Algeria	21.40	q
17	3	Hua Wilfried Koffi	Ivory Coast	21.41	Q
18	2	Innocent Bologo	Burkina Faso	21.46	Q
18	6	Fabrice Dabla	Togo	21.46	q
20	2	Gilbert Otieno	Kenya	21.47	q
21	5	Ngoni Makusha	Zimbabwe	21.61	Q
22	3	Jonathan Permal	Mauritius	21.64	Q
23	1	Leonard Opiny	Uganda	21.72	
24	7	Bienvenu Sawadogo	Burkina Faso	21.73	Q
25	5	Gilles Antony Afoumba	Congo	21.76	
26	4	Émilien Tchan Bi Chan	Ivory Coast	21.78	Q
27	7	Mike Mokamba Nyang'au	Kenya	21.83	
28	4	Pius Adome	Uganda	21.85	
29	6	Mohamed Dawoud	Egypt	21.94	
30	2	Basilius Karupu	Namibia	22.17	
31	1	Sidiki Ouedraogo	Burkina Faso	22.37	
32	2	Mohamed Abdelazim Mohamed	Sudan	22.50	
33	4	Awad El Karim Makki	Sudan	23.04	
34	2	Stephan Ukele	South Sudan	23.07	
35	5	Gilberto Leite	São Tomé and Príncipe	23.49	
36	1	Aziz Ouhadi	Morocco	23.72	
	1	Chidamba Hazemba	Zambia	DNS	
	1	Gogbeu Francis Koné	Ivory Coast	DNS	
	2	Akani Simbine	South Africa	DNS	
	3	Moulaye Sonko	Senegal	DNS	
	3	Abdusetar Kemal	Ethiopia	DNS	
	3	Karabo Mothibi	Botswana	DNS	
	3	Freddy Nguz	Democratic Republic of the Congo	DNS	
	4	Khumbo Makwakwa	Malawi	DNS	
	4	Tjimbatu Kauajo	Namibia	DNS	
	4	Connias Mudzingwa	Zimbabwe	DNS	
	5	Abdulie Azim	Gambia	DNS	
	5	Mlandvo Shongwe	Swaziland	DNS	
	6	Mosito Lehata	Lesotho	DNS	
	7	Abdoulie Assim	Gambia	DNS	
	7	Titus Kafunda	Zambia	DNS	
	7	Gatkuoth Wal	South Sudan	DNS	

=== Semifinals ===
Qualification: First 2 of each heat (Q) and the next 2 fastest (q) qualified for the final.

Wind:
Heat 1: +1.2 m/s, Heat 2: +2.0 m/s, Heat 3: +1.6 m/s

Rank	Heat	Name	Nationality	Time	Notes
1	1	Wayde van Niekerk	South Africa	20.03	Q
2	3	Divine Oduduru	Nigeria	20.48	Q
3	2	Emmanuel Matadi	Liberia	20.51	Q
4	1	Adama Jammeh	Gambia	20.52	Q
5	3	Sydney Siame	Zambia	20.75	Q
6	3	Gabriel Mvumvure	Zimbabwe	20.77	q
7	3	Hua Wilfried Koffi	Ivory Coast	20.82	q
8	1	Emmanuel Dasor	Ghana	20.92	
9	1	Christopher Naliali	Ivory Coast	20.97	
10	2	Clarence Munyai	South Africa	20.99	Q
11	2	Martin Owusu-Antwi	Ghana	21.02	
11	3	Fode Sissoko	Mali	21.02	
13	2	Peter Mwai	Kenya	21.18	
14	1	Skander Djamil Athmani	Algeria	21.28	
15	1	Jonathan Permal	Mauritius	21.31	
16	1	Ahmed Ali	Sudan	21.38	
16	3	Mangar Chep	South Sudan	21.38	
18	2	Fabrice Dabla	Togo	21.49	
19	3	Gilbert Otieno	Kenya	21.52	
20	2	Émilien Tchan Bi Chan	Ivory Coast	21.72	
21	2	Innocent Bologo	Burkina Faso	21.80	
22	3	Bienvenu Sawadogo	Burkina Faso	21.85	
23	1	Ngoni Makusha	Zimbabwe	21.98	
	2	Sibusiso Matsenjwa	Swaziland	DQ	

=== Final ===
Wind: +1.8 m/s

Rank	Lane	Athlete	Nationality	Time	Notes
1st place, gold medalist(s)	5	Wayde van Niekerk	South Africa	20.02	
2nd place, silver medalist(s)	3	Adama Jammeh	Gambia	20.45	
3rd place, bronze medalist(s)	6	Emmanuel Matadi	Liberia	20.55	
4	1	Gabriel Mvumvure	Zimbabwe	20.83	
5	8	Sydney Siame	Zambia	20.83	
6	2	Hua Wilfried Koffi	Ivory Coast	20.92	
	4	Divine Oduduru	Nigeria	DNS	
	7	Clarence Munyai	South Africa	DNS	
