= 2016 African Championships in Athletics – Men's 100 metres =

The men's 100 metres event at the 2016 African Championships in Athletics was held on 22 and 23 June in Kings Park Stadium.

== Medalists ==
Gold	Silver	Bronze
Ben Youssef Meïté; Ivory Coast	Mosito Lehata; Lesotho	Akani Simbine; South Africa

== Results ==
=== Heats ===
Qualification: First 3 of each heat (Q) and the next 6 fastest (q) qualified for the semifinals.

Wind:
Heat 1: +0.8 m/s, Heat 2: +2.0 m/s, Heat 3: +0.5 m/s, Heat 4: +2.3 m/s, Heat 5: +1.5 m/s, Heat 6: +1.6 m/s

Rank	Heat	Name	Nationality	Time	Notes
1	4	Ben Youssef Meïté	Ivory Coast	10.22	Q
2	4	Gerald Phiri	Zambia	10.23	Q
3	6	Emmanuel Matadi	Liberia	10.24	Q
4	2	Akani Simbine	South Africa	10.27	Q
5	5	Mosito Lehata	Lesotho	10.32	Q
6	5	Karabo Mothibi	Botswana	10.33	Q
7	5	Thando Roto	South Africa	10.36	Q
8	3	Arthur Gué Cissé	Ivory Coast	10.39	Q
8	4	Suwaibou Sanneh	Gambia	10.39	Q
10	1	Josh Swaray	Senegal	10.44	Q
10	3	Adama Jammeh	Gambia	10.44	Q
12	2	Gabriel Mvumvure	Zimbabwe	10.46	Q
13	1	Tlotliso Leotlela	South Africa	10.47	Q
13	2	Aziz Ouhadi	Morocco	10.47	Q
15	3	Brian Kasinda	Zambia	10.48	Q
16	3	Moulaye Sonko	Senegal	10.49	q
17	2	Mark Otieno	Kenya	10.51	q
18	1	Titus Kafunda	Zambia	10.53	Q
19	6	Christopher Naliali	Ivory Coast	10.57	Q
20	4	Kokoutse Fabrice Dabla	Togo	10.64	q
21	1	Mlandvo Shongwe	Swaziland	10.65	q
22	2	Keene Motukisi	Botswana	10.66	q
23	4	Jonathan Permal	Mauritius	10.70	q
23	5	Gilbert Otieno	Kenya	10.70	
25	2	Mohamed Dawoud	Egypt	10.72	
26	3	Even Tjiviju	Namibia	10.75	
27	5	Ngoni Makusha	Zimbabwe	10.80	
28	5	Shadrack Opoku-Agyeman	Ghana	10.88	
29	2	Dylan Sicobo	Seychelles	10.89	
30	1	Holder da Silva	Guinea-Bissau	10.93	
31	4	Abdusetar Kemal	Ethiopia	11.00	
32	1	Shingirai Hlanguyo	Zimbabwe	11.14	
33	5	Khumbo Makwakwa	Malawi	11.42	
34	4	Benetch Mulumba Kabongo	Democratic Republic of the Congo	11.50	
35	6	Didier Kiki	Benin	11.58	Q
36	3	Tjimbatu Kauajo	Namibia	11.64	
37	6	Gat Kuoth Wal	South Sudan	11.79	
38	3	Ben Okecha Paul	South Sudan	12.02	
	6	Desdmond Aree	Ghana	DQ	
	6	Gange Etemabeka	Republic of the Congo	DNF	
	1	Mike Mokamba Nyang'au	Kenya	DNS	
	1	Ebrima Camara	Gambia	DNS	
	2	Sidiki Ouedraogo	Burkina Faso	DNS	
	3	Sean Safo-Antwi	Ghana	DNS	
	4	Divine Oduduru	Nigeria	DNS	
	5	Gérard Kobéané	Burkina Faso	DNS	
	6	Idrissa Adam	Cameroon	DNS	
	6	Bediru Mehammed	Ethiopia	DNS	

=== Semifinals ===
Qualification: First 2 of each heat (Q) and the next 2 fastest (q) qualified for the final.

Wind:
Heat 1: +1.3 m/s, Heat 2: +0.6 m/s, Heat 3: +2.1 m/s

Rank	Heat	Name	Nationality	Time	Notes
1	1	Ben Youssef Meïté	Ivory Coast	10.15	Q
2	2	Mosito Lehata	Lesotho	10.20	Q
3	3	Emmanuel Matadi	Liberia	10.20	Q
4	2	Gerald Phiri	Zambia	10.24	Q
5	3	Akani Simbine	South Africa	10.25	Q
6	1	Thando Roto	South Africa	10.28	Q
7	1	Karabo Mothibi	Botswana	10.29	q
7	2	Tlotliso Leotlela	South Africa	10.29	q
7	2	Adama Jammeh	Gambia	10.29	
10	2	Josh Swaray	Senegal	10.31	
11	1	Gabriel Mvumvure	Zimbabwe	10.39	
12	1	Aziz Ouhadi	Morocco	10.40	
13	3	Suwaibou Sanneh	Gambia	10.41	
14	3	Brian Kasinda	Zambia	10.47	
15	3	Moulaye Sonko	Senegal	10.48	
16	2	Mark Otieno	Kenya	10.49	
16	3	Arthur Gué Cissé	Ivory Coast	10.49	
18	1	Titus Kafunda	Zambia	10.51	
19	3	Mlandvo Shongwe	Swaziland	10.56	
20	2	Keene Motukisi	Botswana	10.58	
21	2	Christopher Naliali	Ivory Coast	10.62	
22	1	Kokoutse Fabrice Dabla	Togo	10.74	
23	1	Jonathan Permal	Mauritius	10.74	
24	3	Didier Kiki	Benin	11.25	

=== Final ===
Wind: +2.4 m/s

Rank	Lane	Athlete	Nationality	Time	Notes
1st place, gold medalist(s)	3	Ben Youssef Meïté	Ivory Coast	9.95	
2nd place, silver medalist(s)	4	Mosito Lehata	Lesotho	10.04	
3rd place, bronze medalist(s)	7	Akani Simbine	South Africa	10.05	
4	1	Tlotliso Leotlela	South Africa	10.24	
5	5	Emmanuel Matadi	Liberia	10.24	
6	8	Karabo Mothibi	Botswana	10.36	
	6	Gerald Phiri	Zambia	DNS	
	2	Thando Roto	South Africa	DNS	
