= 2018 African Championships in Athletics – Men's 100 metres =

The men's 100 metres event at the 2018 African Championships in Athletics was held on 1 and 2 August in Asaba, Nigeria.

== Medalists ==
Gold	Silver	Bronze
Akani Simbine; South Africa	Arthur Cissé; Ivory Coast	Simon Magakwe; South Africa

== Results ==
=== Heats ===
Qualification: First 3 of each heat (Q) and the next 6 fastest (q) qualified for the semifinals.

Wind:
Heat 1: -0.5 m/s, Heat 2: -0.9 m/s, Heat 3: -0.2 m/s, Heat 4: -0.8 m/s, Heat 5: -1.1 m/s, Heat 6: -0.6 m/s

Rank	Heat	Name	Nationality	Time	Notes
1	4	Akani Simbine	South Africa	10.30	Q
2	5	Ngoni Makusha	Zimbabwe	10.37	Q
3	1	Ben Youssef Meite	Ivory Coast	10.41	Q
4	1	Simon Magakwe	South Africa	10.42	Q
4	6	Seye Ogunlewe	Nigeria	10.42	Q
6	2	Arthur Cissé	Ivory Coast	10.43	Q
7	6	Gilbert Hainuca	Namibia	10.44	Q
8	5	Karabo Mothibi	Botswana	10.46	Q
9	4	Tatenda Tsumba	Zimbabwe	10.48	Q
10	5	Emmanuel Yeboah	Ghana	10.50	Q
11	1	Ogho-Oghene Egwero	Nigeria	10.52	Q
11	3	Pius Adome	Uganda	10.52	Q
13	1	Ebrahima Camara	Gambia	10.54	q
14	5	Adama Jammeh	Gambia	10.55	q
15	1	Hazemba Chidamba	Zambia	10.56	q
16	4	Mark Odhiambo	Kenya	10.61	Q
17	2	Roscoe Engel	South Africa	10.62	Q
18	4	Enoch Adegoke	Nigeria	10.64	q
19	5	Emmanuel Eseme	Cameroon	10.66	q
20	6	Henry Bandiaky	Senegal	10.68	Q
21	3	Jonathan Bardotier	Mauritius	10.72	Q
22	5	Fabrice Dabla	Togo	10.74	q
23	3	Moulaye Sonko	Senegal	10.75	Q
24	2	Assan Faye	Gambia	10.78	Q
24	3	Keene Motukisi	Botswana	10.78	
26	5	Even Tjiviju	Namibia	10.81	
27	1	Jean-Yann de Grace	Mauritius	10.83	
28	3	Sharry Dodin	Seychelles	10.88	
29	4	Dylan Sicobo	Seychelles	10.90	
30	4	Gnamien Nehemie N'Goran	Ivory Coast	10.91	
31	2	Jean Tarcicius Batambock	Cameroon	10.92	
32	4	Titus Kafunda	Zambia	10.93	
33	6	Leeroy Henriette	Seychelles	10.94	
34	6	Romeo Manzila Mahambou	Republic of the Congo	11.00	
35	2	Didier Kiki	Benin	11.03	
36	4	Nathan Abebe	Ethiopia	11.06	
37	6	Bediru Mohammed	Ethiopia	11.22	
38	1	Maxime Petnga	Cameroon	11.23	
39	3	Abdusetar Kemal	Ethiopia	11.31	
40	5	Mobele Israel Vamtou	Chad	11.37	
41	6	Matar Mabrouk	Chad	11.49	
42	3	Remigio Santander Villa	Equatorial Guinea	11.73	
43	6	Pascual Ngomo Ochaga	Equatorial Guinea	11.98	
44	2	Alpha Diagana	Mauritania	12.26	
	5	Innocent Bologo	Burkina Faso	DQ	
	1	Peter Levo	South Sudan	DNS	
	2	Ali Gulam	Tanzania	DNS	
	2	Abderrahmane Aboubek	Mauritania	DNS	
	3	Alyman Elsaaid	Egypt	DNS	
	4	Ambdoul Karim Riffayn	Comoros	DNS	
	6	Mosito Lehata	Lesotho	DNS	

=== Semifinals ===
Qualification: First 2 of each semifinal (Q) and the next 2 fastest (q) qualified for the final.

Wind:
Heat 1: -0.8 m/s, Heat 2: -0.9 m/s, Heat 3: -0.7 m/s

Rank	Heat	Name	Nationality	Time	Notes
1	3	Arthur Cissé	Ivory Coast	10.29	Q
2	1	Akani Simbine	South Africa	10.32	Q
3	3	Ngoni Makusha	Zimbabwe	10.36	Q
4	2	Simon Magakwe	South Africa	10.37	Q
5	2	Seye Ogunlewe	Nigeria	10.39	Q
6	2	Ben Youssef Meite	Ivory Coast	10.42	q
7	3	Gilbert Hainuca	Namibia	10.43	q
8	2	Tatenda Tsumba	Zimbabwe	10.45	
8	3	Ogho-Oghene Egwero	Nigeria	10.45	
10	1	Karabo Mothibi	Botswana	10.47	Q
11	1	Emmanuel Yeboah	Ghana	10.49	
12	2	Ebrahima Camara	Gambia	10.59	
13	1	Hazemba Chidamba	Zambia	10.63	
13	3	Roscoe Engel	South Africa	10.63	
15	1	Jonathan Bardotier	Mauritius	10.64	
15	3	Adama Jammeh	Gambia	10.64	
15	3	Emmanuel Eseme	Cameroon	10.64	
18	1	Enoch Adegoke	Nigeria	10.68	
19	2	Mark Odhiambo	Kenya	10.69	
20	1	Assan Faye	Gambia	10.74	
21	2	Henry Bandiaky	Senegal	10.83	
22	2	Fabrice Dabla	Togo	10.88	
23	1	Pius Adome	Uganda	10.89	
24	3	Moulaye Sonko	Senegal	10.92	

=== Final ===
Wind: -2.1 m/s

Rank	Lane	Athlete	Nationality	Time	Notes
1st place, gold medalist(s)	5	Akani Simbine	South Africa	10.25	
2nd place, silver medalist(s)	3	Arthur Cissé	Ivory Coast	10.33	
3rd place, bronze medalist(s)	4	Simon Magakwe	South Africa	10.35	
4	1	Ben Youssef Meite	Ivory Coast	10.36	
5	7	Seye Ogunlewe	Nigeria	10.45	
6	6	Ngoni Makusha	Zimbabwe	10.45	
7	2	Gilbert Hainuca	Namibia	10.49	
8	8	Karabo Mothibi	Botswana	10.55	
