= 2016 African Championships in Athletics – Men's 4 × 100 metres relay =

The men's 4 × 100 metres relay event at the 2016 African Championships in Athletics was held on 24 June in Kings Park Stadium.

== Results ==
=== Heats ===
Qualification: First 3 of each heat (Q) and the next 6 fastest (q) qualified for the semifinals.

| Rank | Heat | Nation | Competitors | Time | Notes |
|---|---|---|---|---|---|
| 1 | 2 | Ivory Coast | Christopher Naliali, Hua Wilfried Koffi, Émilien Tchan Bi Chan, Ben Youssef Meïté | 39.70 | Q |
| 2 | 1 | Zambia | Hazemba Chindamba, Brian Kasinda, Titus Kafunda Mukhala, Sydney Siame | 39.86 | Q |
| 3 | 2 | South Africa | Antonio Alkana, Clarence Munyai, Gift Leotlela, Emile Erasmus | 40.04 | Q |
| 4 | 2 | Senegal | Boubacar Sakho, Ismaila Diop, Moulaye Sonko, Johs Swaray | 40.40 | Q |
| 5 | 1 | Botswana | Thabo Motsokona, Karabo Mothibi, Keene Motuktsi, Leaname Maotoanong | 40.50 | Q |
| 6 | 2 | Ghana | Stephen Opoku, Desmond Aryee, Martin Owusu-Antwi, Shadrack Opoku-Agyeman | 40.73 | q |
| 7 | 2 | Kenya | Mark Otieno, Gilbert Otieno, Peter Mwai, Alphas Kishoyian | 41.15 | q |
| 8 | 1 | Zimbabwe | Francis Zimwara, Connias Mudzingwa, Ngoni Makusha, Gabriel Mvumvure | 41.34 | Q |
| 9 | 1 | Swaziland | Sebenele Dlamini, Mcebo Dludlu, Mzambo Mngometulu, Mlandvo Shongwe | 41.79 | |
| | 1 | Republic of the Congo | | DNS | |
| | 1 | Namibia | | DNS | |
| | 1 | Gambia | | DNS | |
| | 1 | Burkina Faso | | DNS | |

=== Final ===
| Rank | Lane | Nation | Competitors | Time | Notes |
|---|---|---|---|---|---|
| 1st place, gold medalist(s) | 6 | South Africa | Emile Erasmus, Wayde van Niekerk, Tlotliso Leotlela, Akani Simbine | 38.84 | |
| 2nd place, silver medalist(s) | 3 | Ivory Coast | Arthur Gué Cissé, Hua Wilfried Koffi, Émilien Tchan Bi Chan, Ben Youssef Meïté | 38.98 | |
| 3rd place, bronze medalist(s) | 5 | Zambia | Hazemba Chindamba, Brian Kasinda, Titus Kafunda Mukhala, Sydney Siame | 39.77 | |
| 4 | 8 | Senegal | Ismaila Diop, Boubacar Sakho, Moulaye Sonko, Johs Swaray | 39.86 | |
| 5 | 1 | Kenya | Mark Otieno, Gilbert Otieno, Peter Mwai, Alphas Kishoyian | 39.97 | |
| 6 | 2 | Ghana | Stephen Opoku, Desmond Aryee, Martin Owusu-Antwi, Shadrack Opoku-Agyeman | 40.21 | |
| 7 | 4 | Botswana | Thabo Motsokona, Karabo Mothibi, Keene Motuktsi, Baboloki Thebe | 40.40 | |
| 8 | 7 | Zimbabwe | Francis Zimwara, Connias Mudzingwa, Ngoni Makusha, Gabriel Mvumvure | 41.02 | |
