= 2014 African Championships in Athletics – Men's 200 metres =

The men's 200 metres event at the 2014 African Championships in Athletics was held August 13–14 on Stade de Marrakech.

== Medalists ==
Gold	Silver	Bronze
Hua Wilfried Koffi; Ivory Coast	Isaac Makwala; Botswana	Carvin Nkanata; Kenya

== Results ==
=== Heats ===
Qualification: First 3 of each heat (Q) and the next 3 fastest (q) qualified for the semifinals.

Wind: Heat 1: -0.3 m/s, Heat 2: -0.7 m/s, Heat 3: +1.0 m/s, Heat 4: 0.0 m/s, Heat 5: +0.3 m/s, Heat 6: +0.1 m/s, Heat 7: -0.5 m/s

Rank	Heat	Name	Nationality	Time	Notes
1	2	Divine Oduduru	Nigeria	20.69	Q
2	2	Hua Wilfried Koffi	Ivory Coast	20.71	Q
3	1	Isaac Makwala	Botswana	20.79	Q
4	5	Idrissa Adam	Cameroon	20.84	Q
5	1	Ncincilili Titi	South Africa	20.87	Q
6	1	Jammeh Adama	Gambia	20.89	Q
7	5	Francis Zimwara	Zimbabwe	20.93	Q
8	4	Mosito Lehata	Lesotho	20.94	Q
9	5	Jonathan Permal	Mauritius	20.98	Q
10	4	Tim Abeyie	Ghana	20.99	Q
11	3	Titus Kafunda	Zambia	21.02	Q
12	7	Solomon Afful	Ghana	21.02	Q
13	6	Carvin Nkanata	Kenya	21.05	Q
14	5	Mark Jelks	Nigeria	21.12	q
15	3	Simon Magakwe	South Africa	21.13	Q
16	2	Even Tjiviju	Namibia	21.14	Q
17	4	Moustapha Traoré	Mali	21.18	Q
18	4	Yateya Kambepera	Botswana	21.21	q
19	3	Leaname Maotoanong	Botswana	21.35	Q
20	6	Seye Ogunlewe	Nigeria	21.39	Q
21	2	Collins Omae	Kenya	21.44	q
22	3	Jean Yann de Grace	Mauritius	21.49	
23	2	Daouda Diagne	Senegal	21.51	
24	3	Gyles Afoumba	Republic of the Congo	21.55	
25	1	Yendoutien Tiebekabe	Togo	21.57	
26	4	Béranger Aymard Bosse	Central African Republic	21.58	
27	1	Moulaye Sonko	Senegal	21.62	
28	4	Holder da Silva	Guinea-Bissau	21.65	
29	4	Brisso Bahorou Akim	Benin	21.66	
30	3	Mohamed El Shushin	Libya	21.68	
31	7	Christopher Naliali	Ivory Coast	21.68	Q
32	1	Leeroy Henriette	Seychelles	21.68	
33	6	Neddy Marie	Seychelles	21.70	Q
34	7	Rodwell Ndhlovu	Zimbabwe	21.82	Q
35	6	Kevin Oliveira	Angola	21.83	
36	7	Ahimed Abdela	Ethiopia	22.04	
37	4	Prisca Baltazar	Angola	22.13	
38	7	Didier Kiki	Benin	22.14	
39	6	Abyot Lencho	Ethiopia	22.15	
40	1	Hamza Mlaab	Morocco	22.15	
41	7	Mustapha Ghizlane	Morocco	22.37	
42	2	Tekle Berhane	Eritrea	22.40	
43	3	Dyland Sicobo	Seychelles	22.47	
44	2	Jannot Bacar	Comoros	22.60	
45	7	Ghyd Kermeliss Olonghot	Republic of the Congo	22.70	
	6	Aziz Ouhadi	Morocco	DNF	
	1	Jean Tarcisus Batambock	Cameroon	DNS	
	2	Denis Opio	Uganda	DNS	
	3	Pierre Paul Bissek	Cameroon	DNS	
	5	Emmanuel Dassor	Ghana	DNS	
	5	Tonny Chirchir	Kenya	DNS	
	5	Sibusiso Matsenjwa	Swaziland	DNS	
	5	Alseny Conde	Guinea	DNS	
	6	Alexandre Mandaba	Central African Republic	DNS	
	6	Mohamed Khwaja	Libya	DNS	
	7	Wayde van Niekerk	South Africa	DNS	

=== Semifinals ===
Qualification: First 2 of each semifinal (Q) and the next 2 fastest (q) qualified for the final.

Wind: Heat 1: -0.5 m/s, Heat 2: -0.9 m/s, Heat 3: -0.5 m/s

Rank	Heat	Name	Nationality	Time	Notes
1	2	Hua Wilfried Koffi	Ivory Coast	20.32	Q
2	2	Isaac Makwala	Botswana	20.34	Q
3	3	Carvin Nkanata	Kenya	20.47	Q
4	1	Ncincilili Titi	South Africa	20.48	Q
5	1	Jammeh Adama	Gambia	20.59	Q
6	1	Idrissa Adam	Cameroon	20.59	q
7	3	Divine Oduduru	Nigeria	20.72	Q
8	1	Francis Zimwara	Zimbabwe	20.83	q
9	1	Jonathan Permal	Mauritius	20.85	
10	3	Solomon Afful	Ghana	20.85	
11	3	Simon Magakwe	South Africa	20.87	
12	2	Titus Kafunda	Zambia	20.88	
13	2	Tim Abeyie	Ghana	20.93	
14	2	Even Tjiviju	Namibia	21.14	
15	3	Leaname Maotoanong	Botswana	21.22	
16	3	Moustapha Traoré	Mali	21.26	
17	2	Yateya Kambepera	Botswana	21.28	
18	3	Collins Omae	Kenya	21.32	
19	1	Neddy Marie	Seychelles	21.63	
20	3	Christopher Naliali	Ivory Coast	21.65	
21	2	Rodwell Ndhlovu	Zimbabwe	21.87	
	1	Mosito Lehata	Lesotho	DQ	R162.6
	1	Mark Jelks	Nigeria	DNS	
	2	Seye Ogunlewe	Nigeria	DNS	

=== Final ===
Wind: -0.8 m/s

Rank	Lane	Name	Nationality	Time	Notes
1st place, gold medalist(s)	3	Hua Wilfried Koffi	Ivory Coast	20.25	NR
2nd place, silver medalist(s)	6	Isaac Makwala	Botswana	20.51	
3rd place, bronze medalist(s)	5	Carvin Nkanata	Kenya	20.53	
4	4	Ncincilili Titi	South Africa	20.63	
5	7	Jammeh Adama	Gambia	20.80	
6	8	Divine Oduduru	Nigeria	20.81	
7	2	Idrissa Adam	Cameroon	20.84	
	1	Francis Zimwara	Zimbabwe	DNS	
