= Emile Erasmus =

South African sprinter (born 1992)

Personal information
- Nationality: South African
- Born: 3 April 1992 (age 34) Pretoria, South Africa
- Height: 192 cm (6 ft 3 1/2 in)
- Weight: 99 kg (218 lb)

Sport
- Country: South Africa
- Sport: Athletics
- Event: 100 metres

Achievements and titles
- Personal best: 100 m: 10.01 (2018)
Medal record
Men's athletics
Representing South Africa
African Championships
Gold medal – first place	2016 Durban	4×100 m
Gold medal – first place	2018 Asaba	4×100 m
Commonwealth Games
Silver medal – second place	2018 Gold Coast	4×100 m

Emile Erasmus (born 3 April 1992) is a South African male track and field sprinter who specialises in the 100 metres. He holds a personal best of 10.01 seconds for the distance.

His first international medal came at the 2011 African Junior Athletics Championships, where he won a bronze in the 100 m, while his compatriot Gideon Trotter took gold. He undertook a degree in civil engineering at the University of Pretoria and continued to train under coach Frans van Rooyen. Standing at 192 cm (6 ft 3 1/2 in), he admired Usain Bolt for proving that height was not necessarily an impediment to speed.

Erasmus improved his 100 m best to 10.23 seconds in the 2014 season, placing third at the South African Athletics Championships. He repeated that feat at the 2015 and 2016 national championships, earning him a place in the national team for the 2016 African Championships in Athletics. Leading off the 4 × 100 metres relay team with Wayde van Niekerk, Tlotliso Leotlela, and Akani Simbine, the quartet took the gold medal. He made an individual breakthrough in the 2017 season with a new 100 m best of 10.08 seconds in his native Pretoria. He spent June and July competing in European meetings that year.

He was selected to compete at the 2018 IAAF World Indoor Championships, but had to withdraw due to an Achilles tendon issue. Erasmus helped set a South African record of 38.24 seconds in the relay at the 2018 Commonwealth Games, taking the silver medals alongside Henricho Bruintjies, Anaso Jobodwana and Akani Simbine (Simbine and Bruintjies had previously completed a 1–2 individually).

== International competitions ==
Year	Competition	Venue	Position	Event	Notes
2011	African Junior Championships	Gaborone, Botswana	3rd	100 m	10.70
2016	African Championships	Durban, South Africa	1st	4 × 100 m relay	38.84
2018	Commonwealth Games	Gold Coast, Australia	2nd	4 × 100 m relay	38.24 NR
2018	African Championships	Asaba, Nigeria	34th (h)	200 m	21.85^{1}
2018	African Championships	Asaba, Nigeria	1st	4 × 100 m relay	38.25
2019	World Relays	Yokohama, Japan	9th (h)	4 × 100 m relay	38.66
2022	World Championships	Eugene, United States	6th	4 × 100 m relay	38.10

^{1}: Did not start in the semifinals
