= 2018 African Championships in Athletics – Men's 200 metres =

The men's 200 metres event at the 2018 African Championships in Athletics was held on 4 and 5 August in Asaba, Nigeria.

== Medalists ==
Gold	Silver	Bronze
Ncincihli Titi; South Africa	Divine Oduduru; Nigeria	Luxolo Adams; South Africa

== Results ==
=== Heats ===
Qualification: First 3 of each heat (Q) and the next 3 fastest (q) qualified for the semifinals.

Wind:
Heat 1: +0.4 m/s, Heat 2: -0.4 m/s, Heat 3: -1.4 m/s, Heat 4: -1.2 m/s, Heat 5: -0.1 m/s, Heat 6: 0.0 m/s, Heat 7: +0.1 m/s

Rank	Heat	Name	Nationality	Time	Notes
1	7	Sydney Siame	Zambia	20.67	Q
2	2	Tatenda Tsumba	Zimbabwe	20.72	Q
3	6	Peter Mwai	Kenya	20.83	Q
4	6	Jeremiah Jakpa	Nigeria	20.87	Q
5	2	Divine Oduduru	Nigeria	20.89	Q
6	5	Ncincihli Titi	South Africa	20.98	Q
7	1	Karabo Mothibi	Botswana	20.99	Q
8	1	Fode Sissoko	Mali	21.03	Q
8	6	Adama Jammeh	Gambia	21.03	Q
10	5	Emmanuel Arowolo	Nigeria	21.10	Q
11	3	Emmanuel Eseme	Cameroon	21.14	Q
12	7	Keene Motukisi	Botswana	21.21	Q
13	7	Assan Faye	Gambia	21.24	Q
14	5	Alieu Joof	Gambia	21.27	Q
15	5	Dickson Kapandura	Zimbabwe	21.28	q
16	2	Sibusiso Matsenjwa	Eswatini	21.29	Q
17	5	Jonathan Bardottier	Mauritius	21.30	q
18	7	Pius Adome	Uganda	21.36	q
19	2	Akeem Sirleaf	Liberia	21.38	
20	6	Lamine Diallo	Senegal	21.40	
21	5	Bienvenu Sawadogo	Burkina Faso	21.42	
22	2	Innocent Bologo	Burkina Faso	21.46	
22	3	Luxolo Adams	South Africa	21.46	Q
24	6	Fabrice Dabla	Togo	21.50	
25	4	Ngoni Makusha	Zimbabwe	21.55	Q
26	1	Orwin Emilien	Mauritius	21.60	Q
27	2	Mike Mokamba Nyang'au	Kenya	21.64	
28	6	Leaname Maotoanong	Botswana	21.65	
29	6	Even Tjiviju	Namibia	21.67	
30	7	Adrin Zedong	Cameroon	21.74	
31	1	Mcebo Mkhaliphi	Eswatini	21.76	
32	2	Jean-Yann de Grace	Seychelles	21.82	
32	6	Hamadou Bachirou	Cameroon	21.82	
34	3	Emile Erasmus	South Africa	21.85	Q
35	7	Ernst Narib	Namibia	21.92	
36	4	Leonard Opiny	Uganda	21.97	Q
37	1	Leeroy Henriette	Seychelles	22.01	
38	1	Gnamien Nehemie N'Goran	Ivory Coast	22.12	
39	4	Sidiki Ouedraogo	Burkina Faso	22.25	Q
40	7	Didier Kiki	Benin	22.38	
41	7	Nathan Abebe	Ethiopia	22.65	
42	4	Matar Mabrouk	Chad	22.95	
43	3	Gadisa Ashebir	Ethiopia	23.27	
44	1	Mobele Israel Vamtou	Chad	23.65	
45	4	Remigio Santander Villa	Equatorial Guinea	23.88	
46	1	Gabriel Olo Matomba	Equatorial Guinea	24.41	
	3	Henry Bandiaky	Senegal	DNS	
	3	Hazemba Chidamba	Zambia	DNS	
	4	Alpha Diagana	Mauritania	DNS	
	4	Sharry Dodin	Seychelles	DNS	
	4	Alyman Elsaaid	Egypt	DNS	
	5	Mosito Lehata	Lesotho	DNS	
	5	Arthur Cissé	Ivory Coast	DNS	
	7	Moulaye Sonko	Senegal	DNS	

=== Semifinals ===
Qualification: First 2 of each semifinal (Q) and the next 2 fastest (q) qualified for the final.

Wind:
Heat 1: +0.1 m/s, Heat 2: -0.3 m/s, Heat 3: +0.2 m/s

Rank	Heat	Name	Nationality	Time	Notes
1	1	Luxolo Adams	South Africa	20.44	Q
2	2	Ncincihli Titi	South Africa	20.57	Q
3	2	Divine Oduduru	Nigeria	20.60	Q
4	2	Peter Mwai	Kenya	20.65	q
5	2	Fode Sissoko	Mali	20.67	q
6	1	Adama Jammeh	Gambia	20.74	Q
6	3	Sydney Siame	Zambia	20.74	Q
8	3	Tatenda Tsumba	Zimbabwe	20.86	Q
9	1	Ngoni Makusha	Zimbabwe	20.94	
10	1	Emmanuel Eseme	Cameroon	21.04	
11	2	Sibusiso Matsenjwa	Eswatini	21.07	
12	3	Emmanuel Arowolo	Nigeria	21.13	
13	1	Jeremiah Jakpa	Nigeria	21.24	
14	2	Assan Faye	Gambia	21.29	
15	3	Karabo Mothibi	Botswana	21.31	
16	2	Dickson Kapandura	Zimbabwe	21.36	
17	3	Jonathan Bardottier	Mauritius	21.38	
18	1	Keene Motukisi	Botswana	21.54	
19	3	Alieu Joof	Gambia	21.57	
20	1	Orwin Emilien	Mauritius	21.74	
21	2	Sidiki Ouedraogo	Burkina Faso	22.29	
	1	Pius Adome	Uganda	DQ	
	3	Leonard Opiny	Uganda	DNS	
	3	Emile Erasmus	South Africa	DNS	

=== Final ===
Wind: ?

Rank	Lane	Athlete	Nationality	Time	Notes
1st place, gold medalist(s)	6	Ncincihli Titi	South Africa	20.46	
2nd place, silver medalist(s)	4	Divine Oduduru	Nigeria	20.60	
3rd place, bronze medalist(s)	3	Luxolo Adams	South Africa	20.70	
4	7	Tatenda Tsumba	Zimbabwe	20.70	
5	1	Fode Sissoko	Mali	20.72	
6	5	Sydney Siame	Zambia	20.79	
7	2	Peter Mwai	Kenya	20.80	
8	8	Adama Jammeh	Gambia	20.91	
