= Christopher Naliali =

Ivorian naturalized French sprinter (born 1992)

Personal information
- Born: 8 March 1992 (age 34)
- Height: 187 cm (6 ft 2 in)
- Weight: 80 kg (176 lb)
Medal record
Men's athletics
Representing Ivory Coast
African Games
Gold medal – first place	2015 Brazzaville	4x100 m relay
African Championships
Silver medal – second place	2016 Durban	4x100 m relay
Representing France
European Team Championships
Silver medal – second place	2019 Bydgoszcz	4x400 m relay

Christopher Naliali (born 8 March 1992) is an Ivorian naturalized French sprinter who specializes in the 100 and 200 metres.

In his main event, the 200 metres, he reached the semi-final of the 2014 African Championships and the 2016 African Championships (in the latter event he also reached the semi of the 100 metres. He was knocked out in the heats at the 2017 Summer Universiade.

As a part of the Ivorian 4 × 100 metres relay team he won a gold medal at the 2015 African Games and a silver medal (as a heats-only competitor) at the 2016 African Championships.

His personal best times are 6.68 seconds in the 60 metres (indoor), achieved in February 2016 in Aubière; 10.36 seconds in the 100 metres, achieved in June 2016 in Argentan; and 20.76 seconds in the 200 metres, achieved in June 2017 in New York City.
