= Athletics at the 2015 Summer Universiade – Men's 100 metres =

The men's 100 metres event at the 2015 Summer Universiade was held on 8 and 9 July at the Gwangju Universiade Main Stadium.

Senegal's quarterfinalist Daouda Diagne was disqualified and banned for four years after giving a positive doping test at the competition.

== Medalists ==
Gold	Silver	Bronze
Akani Simbine; South Africa	Kemarley Brown; Jamaica	Ramil Guliyev; Turkey

== Results ==
=== Heats ===
Qualification: First 3 in each heat (Q) and next 5 fastest (q) qualified for the quarterfinals.

Wind:
Heat 1: +0.8 m/s, Heat 2: +1.7 m/s, Heat 3: -0.4 m/s, Heat 4: +1.0 m/s, Heat 5: +1.2 m/s, Heat 6: +0.6 m/s, Heat 7: +0.8 m/s, Heat 8: +1.3 m/s, Heat 9: +0.6 m/s

Rank	Heat	Name	Nationality	Time	Notes
1	2	Ronald Baker	United States	10.18	Q
2	1	Akani Simbine	South Africa	10.23	Q
3	4	Jin Su Jung	Australia	10.27	Q, PB
4	6	Kim Kuk-young	South Korea	10.30	Q, SB
5	4	Kemarley Brown	Jamaica	10.32	Q
6	4	Tom Kling Baptiste	Sweden	10.35	Q, SB
6	6	Markesh Woodson	United States	10.35	Q
8	7	Mobolade Ajomale	Canada	10.41	Q
9	9	Yang Yang	China	10.42	Q
10	9	Gideon Trotter	South Africa	10.42	Q
11	2	Yuki Koike	Japan	10.43	Q
11	4	Rytis Sakalauskas	Lithuania	10.43	q, SB
13	1	Bismark Boateng	Canada	10.47	Q
13	5	Tom Gamble	Australia	10.47	Q
15	9	Emmanuel Appiah Kubi	Ghana	10.50	Q, SB
16	1	Tatsuro Suwa	Japan	10.51	Q
17	9	Adam Pawłowski	Poland	10.54	q, PB
18	5	Ramil Guliyev	Turkey	10.55	Q
19	6	Jonathan Nyepa	Malaysia	10.56	Q, PB
19	7	Jeffrey Vanan	Suriname	10.56	Q, PB
19	7	Aleksandr Brednev	Russia	10.56	Q
22	1	Dmitriy Lopin	Russia	10.57	q
23	5	Kim Woo-sam	South Korea	10.58	Q, PB
24	9	Chukwuma Onyeaku	Nigeria	10.61	q
25	8	Jakub Adamski	Poland	10.64	Q
25	9	Odain Rose	Sweden	10.64	q
27	2	LeSean Noel	Trinidad and Tobago	10.65	Q
28	3	Gao Ze	China	10.66	Q
28	5	Li Lut Yin	Hong Kong	10.66	
30	6	Rafael Vásquez	Venezuela	10.68	
31	3	Kristoffer Buhagen	Norway	10.69	Q
31	8	Daouda Diagne	Senegal	(10.69)	DQ
33	8	Martin Owusu Antwi	Ghana	10.72	Q
34	1	Ugnius Savickas	Lithuania	10.77	SB
34	1	Solomon Obuto	Uganda	10.77	
34	2	Fallon Forde	Barbados	10.77	
37	4	Gerren Muwishi	Zimbabwe	10.78	PB
37	7	Blaž Brulc	Slovenia	10.78	
39	4	Moulaye Sonko	Senegal	10.79	
40	9	Fred Dorsey III	United States Virgin Islands	10.81	
41	5	Harith Ammar Mohd Sobri	Malaysia	10.85	
42	6	Ronalds Arājs	Latvia	10.88	SB
43	6	Jorge Oscar Caracassis	Argentina	10.91	
44	9	Choi Ho Sing	Hong Kong	10.96	
45	8	Knight Chongo	Zambia	10.99	
46	3	Godwin Byamukama	Uganda	11.00	Q
47	8	Luke Bezzina	Malta	11.07	SB
48	7	Usama Al-Gheilani	Oman	11.09	
49	8	Saif Al-Obaidani	Oman	11.11	PB
50	8	Kago Ditiro Sebele	Botswana	11.19	
51	7	Mohamed Riad Allaoua	Algeria	11.29	
52	5	Abdel Rahim Rayess	Lebanon	11.36	
53	5	Watagodapitiye Gedara	Sri Lanka	11.46	
54	2	Mohammad Firoz	Bangladesh	11.60	
55	2	Jervo Barroga	Philippines	11.61	
56	1	Neuell Afable	Philippines	11.92	
57	3	Mustafa Mohammadi	Afghanistan	12.35	
58	4	Abdul Sediqi	Afghanistan	13.53	
	3	Nget Phearath	Cambodia	DQ	R162.7
	3	Yang Chun-han	Chinese Taipei	DQ	R162.7
	7	Diogo Antunes	Portugal	DQ	R162.7
	2	Alhaji Bah	Sierra Leone	DNS	
	3	Hua Wilfried Koffi	Ivory Coast	DNS	
	6	Tega Odele	Nigeria	DNS	
	8	Hassan Taftian	Iran	DNS	

=== Quarterfinals ===
Qualification: First 3 in each heat (Q) and the next 4 fastest (q) qualified for the semifinals.

Wind:
Heat 1: -0.8 m/s, Heat 2: -1.5 m/s, Heat 3: -1.1 m/s, Heat 4: -1.1 m/s

Rank	Heat	Name	Nationality	Time	Notes
1	4	Akani Simbine	South Africa	10.26	Q
2	3	Ronald Baker	United States	10.35	Q
3	2	Kim Kuk-young	South Korea	10.36	Q
4	1	Markesh Woodson	United States	10.38	Q
4	4	Kemarley Brown	Jamaica	10.38	Q
6	4	Ramil Guliyev	Turkey	10.40	Q
7	4	Tom Gamble	Australia	10.40	q
8	1	Jin Su Jung	Australia	10.48	Q
9	1	Yuki Koike	Japan	10.49	Q
10	2	Yang Yang	China	10.51	Q
11	4	Aleksandr Brednev	Russia	10.54	q
12	1	Bismark Boateng	Canada	10.55	q
12	2	Mobolade Ajomale	Canada	10.55	Q
14	4	Chukwuma Onyeaku	Nigeria	10.56	q
15	2	Gideon Trotter	South Africa	10.58	
16	1	Tom Kling Baptiste	Sweden	10.59	
17	2	Adam Pawłowski	Poland	10.60	
18	2	Emmanuel Appiah Kubi	Ghana	10.60	
19	2	Rytis Sakalauskas	Lithuania	10.64	
20	3	Jeffrey Vanan	Suriname	10.69	Q
21	1	Jonathan Nyepa	Malaysia	10.72	
22	1	Dmitriy Lopin	Russia	10.74	
22	3	LeSean Noel	Trinidad and Tobago	10.74	Q
24	3	Odain Rose	Sweden	10.75	
25	3	Kim Woo-sam	South Korea	10.78	
26	3	Jakub Adamski	Poland	10.84	
27	3	Gao Ze	China	10.96	
28	4	Martin Owusu Antwi	Ghana	10.97	
29	1	Godwin Byamukama	Uganda	11.19	
30	4	Daouda Diagne	Senegal	(11.25)	DQ
	2	Tatsuro Suwa	Japan	DQ	R162.7
	3	Kristoffer Buhagen	Norway	DNS	

=== Semifinals ===
Qualification: First 4 in each heat (Q) qualified for the final.

Wind:
Heat 1: +1.8 m/s, Heat 2: +0.3 m/s

Rank	Heat	Name	Nationality	Time	Notes
1	2	Akani Simbine	South Africa	10.00	Q, UR
2	1	Ronald Baker	United States	10.14	Q
3	1	Kim Kuk-young	South Korea	10.16	Q, NR
4	2	Ramil Guliyev	Turkey	10.19	Q
5	2	Kemarley Brown	Jamaica	10.19	Q
6	1	Yang Yang	China	10.24	Q, PB
7	2	Markesh Woodson	United States	10.26	Q
8	1	Jin Su Jung	Australia	10.28	Q
8	2	Tom Gamble	Australia	10.28	PB
10	1	Yuki Koike	Japan	10.35	SB
11	1	Bismark Boateng	Canada	10.37	PB
12	1	Mobolade Ajomale	Canada	10.43	
13	1	Aleksandr Brednev	Russia	10.51	
14	2	LeSean Noel	Trinidad and Tobago	10.54	
15	2	Chukwuma Onyeaku	Nigeria	10.55	SB
16	2	Jeffrey Vanan	Suriname	10.77	

=== Final ===
Wind: 0.0 m/s

Official Video

Rank	Lane	Name	Nationality	Time	Notes
1st place, gold medalist(s)	5	Akani Simbine	South Africa	9.97	UR
2nd place, silver medalist(s)	7	Kemarley Brown	Jamaica	10.12	
3rd place, bronze medalist(s)	6	Ramil Guliyev	Turkey	10.16	
4	4	Ronald Baker	United States	10.17	
5	1	Markesh Woodson	United States	10.19	
6	3	Kim Kuk-young	South Korea	10.31	
7	2	Jin Su Jung	Australia	10.33	
8	8	Yang Yang	China	10.41	
