= Akani Simbine =

South African sprinter (born 1993)

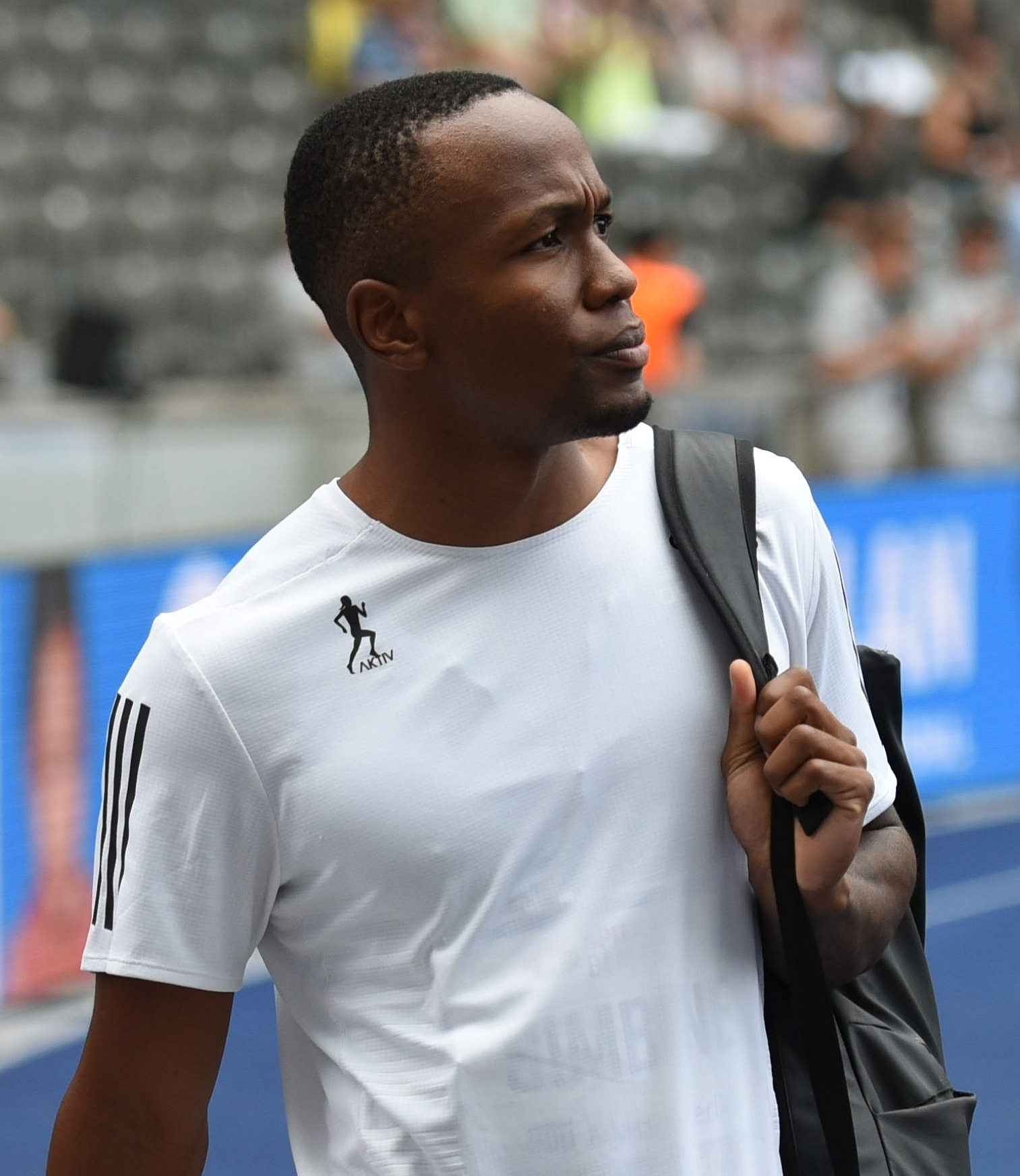
- Simbine in 2019

Personal information
- Nationality: South African
- Born: 21 September 1993 (age 33) Kempton Park, Gauteng, South Africa
- Height: 1.76 m (5 ft 9 in)
- Weight: 74 kg (163 lb)

Sport
- Country: South Africa
- Sport: Athletics
- Events: 100 m; 200 m
- University team: University of Pretoria Tuks HPC
- Coached by: Werner Prinsloo

Achievements and titles
- Personal bests: 100 m: 9.82 NR (Paris 2024); 150 m: 15.08 A (2020); 200 m: 19.95 A (2017)
Medal record
Men's athletics
Representing South Africa
Olympic Games
| Silver medal – second place | 2024 Paris | 4×100 m relay |
World Indoor Championships
| Bronze medal – third place | 2025 Nanjing | 60 metres |
World Relays
| Gold medal – first place | 2025 Guangzhou | 4×100 m relay |
| Disqualified | 2021 Chorzów | 4×100 m relay |
| Silver medal – second place | 2026 Gaborone | 4×100 m relay |
| Silver medal – second place | 2019 Yokohama | 4×200 m relay |
Commonwealth Games
| Gold medal – first place | 2018 Gold Coast | 100 m |
| Silver medal – second place | 2018 Gold Coast | 4×100 m relay |
| Silver medal – second place | 2022 Birmingham | 100 m |
African Championships
| Gold medal – first place | 2016 Durban | 4×100 m relay |
| Gold medal – first place | 2018 Asaba | 100 m |
| Gold medal – first place | 2018 Asaba | 4×100 m relay |
| Silver medal – second place | 2022 Mauritius | 100 m |
| Bronze medal – third place | 2016 Durban | 100 m |
Universiade
| Gold medal – first place | 2015 Gwangju | 100 m |
| Bronze medal – third place | 2015 Gwangju | 4×100 m relay |
Representing Africa
Continental Cup
| Bronze medal – third place | 2018 Ostrava | 100 m |

Akani Simbine (born 21 September 1993) is a South African sprinter specialising in the 100 metres event. He was fifth at the 2016 Summer Olympics in the men's 100 metres and was the 100 metres African record holder with a time of 9.84 seconds set in July 2021 until broken by Ferdinand Omanyala in September 2021.

Simbine was a World Championships finalist in the men's 100 metres in 2017 (fifth), 2019 (fourth), and 2022 (fifth) and was 100 metres champion at the 2018 African Championships and 2018 Commonwealth Games. In the 4 × 100 metres relay, he helped South Africa become champions at the African Championships in 2016 and 2018, and place second at the 2018 Commonwealth Games with a South African record time of 38.24 seconds. He anchored South Africa to gold at the 2021 World Relays. Simbine has finished inside the top 5 in the last four major championship 100m races, including 4th at the 2019 World Championships and 2020 Summer Olympics missing out on the bronze medal to Canadian sprinter Andre De Grasse.

After missing out on a medal yet again in the men's 100 metres at the 2024 Paris Olympics – finishing fourth with a new South African record time of 9.82, Simbine finally won an Olympic silver medal as part of South Africa's 4 × 100 metres relay team on 9 August 2024.

On 10 July 2024, the South African Olympic Committee designated him and the artistic gymnast Caitlin Rooskrantz as the flag bearers at the París 2024 Olympic Games.

== Career ==
=== 2013 World Championships ===
He competed in the 100 metres event at the 2013 World Championships in Athletics.

=== 2015 Universiade ===
Whilst an Information Science student at the University of Pretoria, Simbine equalled the South African 100m record and set an event record on 9 July 2015 in his gold medal-winning run at the 2015 Universiade in Gwangju, South Korea.

=== 2016 South African record and Olympic Games ===
Simbine again broke the South African 100m record with a time of 9.89 seconds at the Gyulai István Memorial in Székesfehérvár on 18 July 2016. He finished fifth in 9.94 seconds in the 100 m final of the 2016 Olympics in Rio de Janeiro on 14 August 2016.

=== 2017 ===
In the first meet of the 2017 IAAF Diamond League in Doha, Simbine won the 100 m event with a time of 9.99 seconds.

=== 2018 ===
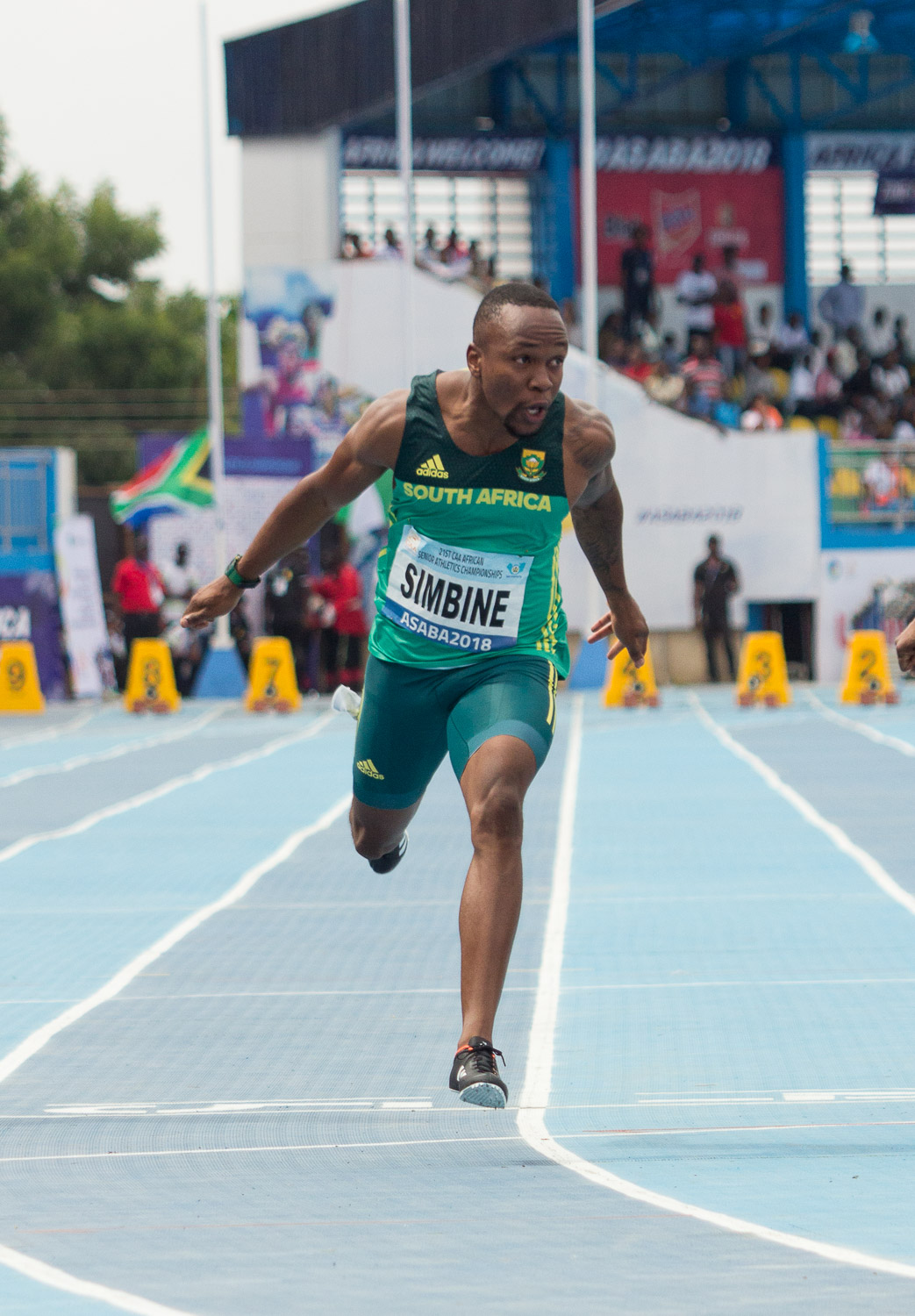
Simbine in 2018

Simbine won the 2018 Commonwealth Games 100 m final in 10.03 seconds, relegating pre-race favourite Yohan Blake into third.

=== 2020 ===
Simbine started his 2020 season with a 150 metre race at the University of Johannesburg Stadium on 14 February, equalling the South African record time (15.08) while jogging to the finish line, but with no wind information. He ran his first 100 m for the season on 14 March at the University of Pretoria Tuks Stadium. Unsure whether or not he would be able to compete later in the season because of the rapidly spreading COVID-19 pandemic, he pushed to the finish line in a world-leading time of 9.91 seconds in the heats.

Simbine stopped track training in March and didn't get permission to resume training again until July, weeks after other sports had resumed training after he pleaded with Athletics South Africa to allow athletes back onto the track. He would not be able to compete until leaving South Africa in mid-August for Europe, winning a series of 100 m competitions in Marseille, Rovereto, and Bellinzona in times of 10.19, 10.17, and 10.02 seconds respectively. He finished his season in September with a 100 m victory at the Rome Diamond League, trailing Arthur Cissé of the Ivory Coast for the first 85 m before passing to win in 9.96 seconds.

=== 2021 ===
Simbine started the season with a 10.00 seconds win in the 100 metres at the Athletix Invitational in Johannesburg on 23 March, which would have been a leading time but for the wind velocity, which was just over the allowable +2.0 m/s limit. He broke 10 seconds at the Gauteng North Championships at the University of Pretoria on 27 March, winning 9.99 seconds ahead of Gift Leotlela (10.20) into a –3.0 wind. According to SuperSport, Simbine claimed that the "windy conditions were some of the worst I ever raced in."

On 15 April at the South African Championships in Pretoria, Simbine competed in the men's 100 metres, finishing his first round heat in 10.11 seconds. He then won his semi-final in 9.82 seconds, the fastest he had ever run, but the wind was again over the limit for record purposes at +2.8 m/s. The next day, he clocked his 29th sub-10-second time with 9.99 seconds to win the final, finishing 0.17 seconds ahead of second placing Gift Leotlela's 10.16 seconds.

Two weeks later, on 2 May, Simbine anchored South Africa to gold in the men's 4 × 100 metres relay at the 2021 World Relays. He received the baton three metres behind Brazil's Paulo André de Oliveira but managed to close the gap and finish one-hundredth of a second ahead of Brazil with a time of 38.71 seconds.

On 6 July, racing at the Hungarian Athletics Grand Prix, Simbine set a new national and African record of 9.84 seconds in winning the final.

On 1 August, at the 2020 Summer Olympics, held in Tokyo, Japan, Simbine finished fourth in a time of 9.93 seconds, behind winner Lamont Marcell Jacobs of Italy, with a time of 9.80 seconds.

=== 2024 ===
On 4 August, Simbine missed a podium finish in his third consecutive Olympic 100-metre final at the 2024 Summer Olympics, setting a national record of 9.82 seconds in fourth place.

On 9 August, Simbine finally won an Olympic medal as part of the South African 4 × 100 metres relay team by claiming silver.

=== 2025 ===
In March 2025, Simbine won bronze at the World Indoor Championships at the 60m race with a time of 6.53s. This was his first global individual medal. He finished behind Lachlan Kennedy and Jeremiah Azu, with the latter taking gold.

On 19 April 2025, Simbine became the only athlete in history to run a sub-10 seconds over 100m for 11 consecutive years when he won gold over 100m at the Botswana Grand Prix in Gaborone. He won the race by running 9.90s over 100m, a world-lead for 2025. The record was previously held by Usain Bolt with 10 years.

In April 2025, Simbine ran 9.99s over 100m to win gold at the first Diamond League of the season in Xiamen, China.

In April 2025, Simbine was selected, by the Athletics South Africa (ASA), as the men's athletics team captain for Team SA for the World Athletics Relays championship to be held in Guangzhou, China on 10 and 11 May 2025.

In May 2025, Simbine anchored South Africa to win gold at the 100mx4 at the World Relays in Guangzhou. He also won the 100m race in Atlanta on 17 May 2025 with a time of 9.86s.

On 25 May 2025, Simbine took gold in 100m at the Rabat Diamond League by running 9.95s. Making it his 3rd Diamond League win of the session

== Statistics ==
Information from World Athletics profile unless otherwise noted.

=== Personal bests ===
| Event | Time (s) | Wind (m/s) | Venue | Date | Notes |
|---|---|---|---|---|---|
| 100 m | 9.82 | +1.0 | Saint-Denis, France | 4 August 2024 | |
| 100 m | 9.82 A w | +2.8 | Pretoria, South Africa | 15 April 2021 | Altitude-assisted and wind-assisted |
| 150 m | 15.08 A | NWI | Johannesburg, South Africa | 15 February 2020 | Altitude-assisted, no wind information |
| 200 m | 19.95 A | +1.7 | Pretoria, South Africa | 4 March 2017 | Altitude-assisted |
| 4×100 m relay | 37.65 | —N/a | Doha, Qatar | 4 October 2019 | African record (Note: Shared with Thando Dlodlo, Simon Magakwe, and Clarence Munyai for South Africa. Simbine anchored.) |
| 4×200 m relay | 1:20.42 | —N/a | Yokohama, Japan | 12 May 2019 | African record (Note: Shared with Simon Magakwe, Chederick van Wyk, and Sinesipho Dambile. Simbine anchored.) |

=== International championship results ===
Representing South Africa and Africa (Continental Cup only)
| Year | Competition | Venue | Position | Event | Time | Wind (m/s) | Notes |
|---|---|---|---|---|---|---|---|
| 2013 | Universiade | Kazan, Russia | 9th | 100 m | 10.49 | −0.4 | |
| 2013 | Universiade | Kazan, Russia | 7th | 4×100 m relay | 45.82 | —N/a | |
| 2013 | World Championships | Moscow, Russia | 37th | 100 m | 10.38 | −0.3 | |
| 2014 | Commonwealth Games | Glasgow, Scotland | 11th | 100 m | 10.21 | −0.5 | |
| 2014 | Commonwealth Games | Glasgow, Scotland | 5th | 200 m | 20.37 | +0.5 | PB |
| 2014 | Commonwealth Games | Glasgow, Scotland | 4th | 4×100 m relay | 38.35 | —N/a | NR (Note: Shared with Henricho Bruintjies, Simon Magakwe, and Ncincilili Titi for South Africa. Simbine anchored.) |
| 2014 | African Championships | Marrakesh, Morocco | 8th | 100 m | 13.14 | +0.4 | |
| 2015 | Universiade | Gwangju, Korea | 1st | 100 m | 9.97 | 0.0 | NR, GR |
| 2015 | Universiade | Gwangju, Korea | 3rd | 4×100 m relay | 39.68 | —N/a | Anchor |
| 2015 | World Championships | Beijing, China | 11th | 100 m | 10.02 | +0.9 | |
| 2015 | World Championships | Beijing, China | 17th | 200 m | 20.37 | +0.4 | |
| 2015 | World Championships | Beijing, China | DNF (semi 2) | 4×100 m relay | — | —N/a | |
| 2016 | African Championships | Durban, South Africa | 3rd | 100 m | 10.05 w | +2.4 | Wind-assisted |
| 2016 | African Championships | Durban, South Africa | 1st | 4×100 m relay | 38.84 | —N/a | |
| 2016 | Olympic Games | Rio de Janeiro, Brazil | 5th | 100 m | 9.94 | +0.2 | |
| 2017 | World Championships | London, England | 5th | 100 m | 10.01 | −0.8 | |
| 2017 | World Championships | London, England | 18th | 200 m | 20.62 w | +2.1 | Wind-assisted |
| 2018 | Commonwealth Games | Gold Coast, Australia | 1st | 100 m | 10.03 | +0.8 | SB |
| 2018 | Commonwealth Games | Gold Coast, Australia | 2nd | 4×100 m relay | 38.24 | —N/a | NR (Note: Shared with Henricho Bruintjies, Emile Erasmus, and Anaso Jobodwana for South Africa. Simbine anchored.) |
| 2018 | African Championships | Asaba, Nigeria | 1st | 100 m | 10.25 | −2.1 | |
| 2018 | African Championships | Asaba, Nigeria | 1st | 4×100 m relay | 38.25 | —N/a | Anchor |
| 2018 | Continental Cup | Ostrava, Czech Republic | 3rd | 100 m | 10.11 | 0.0 | |
| 2018 | Continental Cup | Ostrava, Czech Republic | DNF | 4×100 m relay | — | —N/a | |
| 2019 | World Relays | Yokohama, Japan | 9th | 4×100 m relay | 38.66 | —N/a | |
| 2019 | World Relays | Yokohama, Japan | 2nd | 4×200 m relay | 1:20.42 | —N/a | AR |
| 2019 | World Championships | Doha, Qatar | 4th | 100 m | 9.93 | +0.6 | |
| 2019 | World Championships | Doha, Qatar | 5th | 4×100 m relay | 37.73 | —N/a | |
| 2021 | World Relays | Chorzów, Poland | 1st (stripped) | 4×100 m relay | 38.71 | —N/a | Anchor |
| 2021 | Olympic Games | Tokyo, Japan | 4th | 100 m | 9.93 | +0.1 | |
| 2021 | Olympic Games | Tokyo, Japan | – | 4×100 m relay | DNF | —N/a | |
| 2022 | African Championships | Port Louis, Mauritius | 2nd | 100 m | 9.93 | +4.5 | |
| 2022 | African Championships | Port Louis, Mauritius | 6th (h) | 4×100 m relay | 40.99 | —N/a | |
| 2022 | World Championships | Eugene, United States | 5th | 100 m | 10.01 | −0.1 | |
| 2022 | World Championships | Eugene, United States | 6th | 4 × 100 m relay | 38.10 | —N/a | |
| 2023 | World Championships | Budapest, Hungary | 3rd (h) | 100 m | 9.97^{1} | | |
| 2023 | World Championships | Budapest, Hungary | 5th (h) | 4 × 100 m relay | 37.72^{2} | | |
| 2024 | Olympic Games | Paris, France | 4th | 100 m | 9.82 | +1.0 | NR |
| 2024 | Olympic Games | Paris, France | 2nd | 4 × 100 m relay | 37.57 | | AR |
| 2025 | World Indoor Championships | Nanjing, China | 3rd | 60 m | 6.54 | —N/a | |
| 2025 | World Championships | Tokyo, Japan | 7th | 100 m | 10.04 | +0.3 | |
| 2025 | World Championships | Tokyo, Japan | 13th (h) | 4 × 100 m relay | 38.64 | —N/a | |
| 2026 | Commonwealth Games | Glasgow, United Kingdom | 1st (h) | 4 × 100 m relay | 38.30^{3} | —N/a | |
| 2026 | World Ultimate Championship | Budapest, Hungary | 8th | 100 m | 10.09 | −0.6 | |

^{1}Disqualified in the semifinals

^{2}Did not finish in the final

^{3}Disqualified in the final

=== Circuit wins and national titles ===
- Diamond League (100 m)
  - Doha: 2017
  - London: 2019
  - Rome: 2020
- South African Championships
  - 100 m: 2015, 2017, 2021
  - 200 m: 2019

=== Seasonal bests ===
| Year | 100 m | 200 m |
|---|---|---|
| 2010 | 10.61 | 21.91 |
| 2011 | 10.57 | 21.27 |
| 2012 | 10.19 | 20.68 |
| 2013 | 10.36 | 20.79 |
| 2014 | 10.02 | 20.37 |
| 2015 | 9.97 | 20.23 |
| 2016 | 9.89 | 20.16 |
| 2017 | 9.92 | 19.95 |
| 2018 | 9.93 | — |
| 2019 | 9.92 | 20.27 |
| 2020 | 9.91 A | — |
| 2021 | 9.84 | 20.29 A w |
| 2024 | 9.82 | — |

=== Track records ===
As of 9 September 2024, Simbine holds the following track records for 100 metres.

| Location | Time | Windspeed m/s | Date | Notes |
|---|---|---|---|---|
| Gold Coast, Queensland | 10.03 | + 0.8 | 09/04/2018 | |
| Gwangju | 9.97 | 0.0 | 09/07/2015 | |
| Karlstad | 10.09 | + 2.7 | 22/07/2015 | |
| Kladno | 10.07 | + 0.3 | 13/06/2023 | |
| Paarl | 10.08 | – 0.4 | 22/03/2018 | |
| Pietermaritzburg | 10.01 | – 0.5 | 19/04/2024 | |
| Potchefstroom | 9.92 | + 0.6 | 30/03/2023 | |
| Pretoria | 9.82 | + 2.8 | 15/04/2021 | |
| Roodepoort | 10.00 | + 2.1 | 23/03/2021 | |
| Saint Pierre | 9.93 | + 4.5 | 09/06/2022 | Track record shared with Kenyan sprinter Ferdinand Omanyala from the same race. |
| Stellenbosch | 10.06 | – 0.1 | 15/04/2016 | |
| Suzhou | 10.01 | – 0.1 | 27/04/2024 | |
| Székesfehérvár | 9.84 | + 1.2 | 06/07/2021 | |

== See also ==
- 2020 in 100 metres

== Notes ==
Olympic Games
| Preceded by Phumelela Mbande; Chad le Clos | Flagbearer for South Africa; París 2024; With: Caitlin Rooskrantz | Succeeded by Incumbent |
