= Ahmed Ali (Sudanese sprinter) =

Sudanese sprinter

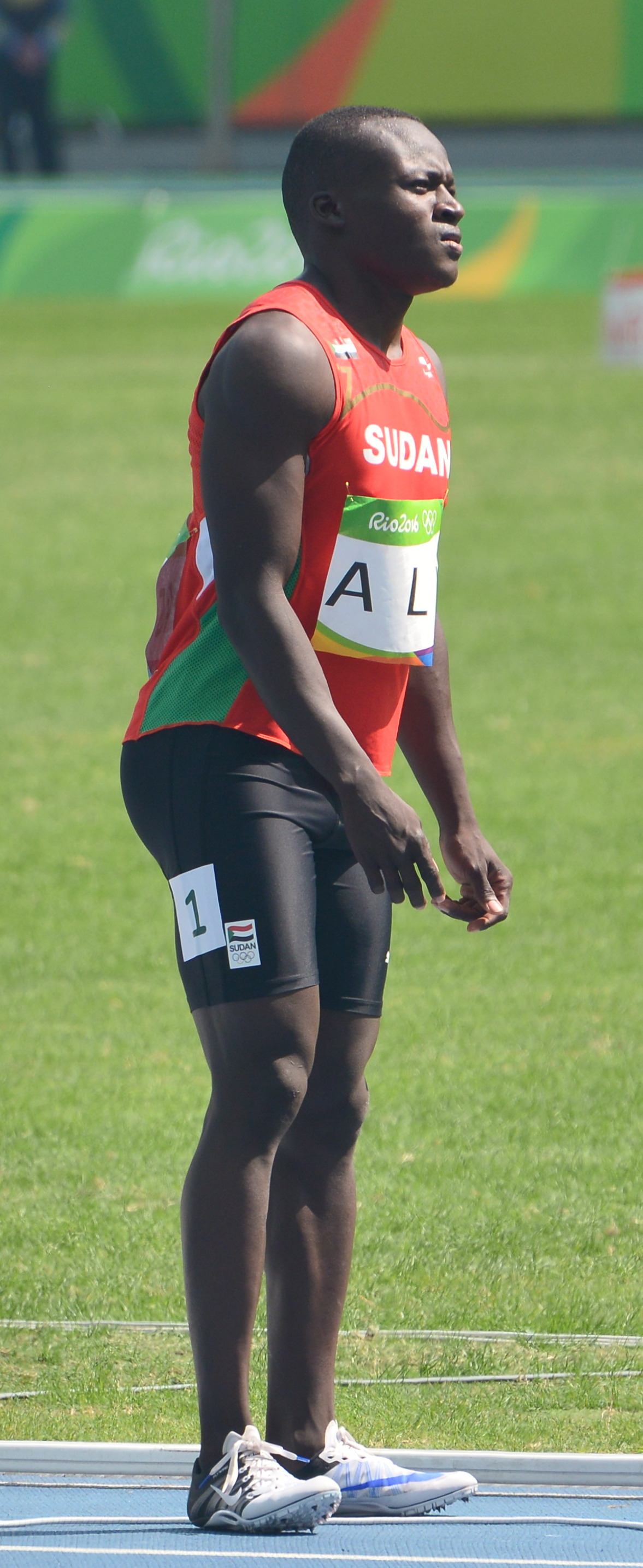
- Ali at the 2016 Olympics

Personal information
- Born: 15 November 1993 (age 32) Houston, Texas, U.S.
- Education: South Plains College; University of Alabama
- Height: 1.80 m (5 ft 11 in)
- Weight: 80 kg (176 lb)

Sport
- Country: Sudan
- Sport: Track and field
- Events: 100 m, 200 m
- Coached by: Dan Waters

Achievements and titles
- Personal bests: 60 m – 6.66 (2013); 100 m – 10.23 (2013); 200 m – 20.16 (2016)
- Updated on 29 August 2015

Ahmed Ali (born 15 November 1993) is a Sudanese sprinter. He competed in the 200 metres at the 2015 World Championships in Beijing, but was disqualified in the first round. He also competed in the 200 at the 2016 Olympics, finishing in a seventh place tie with Jaysuma Saidy Ndure in the opening round.

Ali attended and ran for Alief Hastings High School in Houston, Texas, South Plains College and the University of Alabama.

== International competitions ==
Year	Competition	Venue	Position	Event	Notes
Representing Sudan
2015	World Championships	Beijing, China	–	200 m	DQ
2016	African Championships	Durban, South Africa	16th (sf)	200 m	21.38
2016	Olympic Games	Rio de Janeiro, Brazil	58th (h)	200 m	20.78
2017	World Championships	London, United Kingdom	30th (h)	200 m	20.64
