= Brian Kasinda =

Zambian sprinter

Personal information
- Born: 31 December 1997 (age 28)

Sport
- Sport: Athletics
- Event(s): 60 m, 100 m, 200 m
Medal record
Men's athletics
Representing Zambia
African Championships
Bronze medal – third place	2016 Durban	4×100 m

Brian Kasinda (born 31 December 1997) is a Zambian sprinter. He competed in the 60 metres at the 2016 IAAF World Indoor Championships without advancing from the first round.

== Competition record ==
Year	Competition	Venue	Position	Event	Notes
Representing Zambia
2013	African Youth Championships	Warri, Nigeria	7th	100 m	11.45
2013	African Youth Championships	Warri, Nigeria	5th	200 m	22.37
2013	World Youth Championships	Donetsk, Ukraine	35th (h)	200 m	22.12
2014	African Youth Games	Gaborone, Botswana	2nd	200 m	21.02
2014	World Junior Championships	Eugene, United States	40th (h)	200 m	21.58
2014	Youth Olympic Games	Nanjing, China	5th	200 m	21.61
2015	African Junior Championships	Addis Ababa, Ethiopia	14th (sf)	100 m	11.17
2015	African Junior Championships	Addis Ababa, Ethiopia	7th (h)	4 × 100 m relay	42.08^{1}
2015	African Games	Brazzaville, Republic of the Congo	6th	100 m	10.47
2015	African Games	Brazzaville, Republic of the Congo	3rd (h)	4 × 100 m relay	39.31^{2}
2016	World Indoor Championships	Portland, United States	36th (h)	60 m	6.80
2016	African Championships	Durban, South Africa	14th (sf)	100 m	10.47
2016	African Championships	Durban, South Africa	3rd	4 × 100 m relay	39.77

^{1}Did not start in the final

^{2}Disqualified in the final

== Personal bests ==
Outdoor

- 100 metres – 10.20 (+0.1 m/s, Lusaka 2016)
- 200 metres – 21.02 (+1.0 m/s, Gaborone 2014)

Indoor

- 60 metres – 6.80 (Portland 2016)
