= Clarence Munyai =

South African sprinter

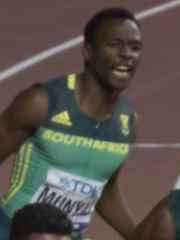
- Munyai in 2019

Personal information
- Nationality: South African
- Born: 20 February 1998 (age 28) Johannesburg, South Africa
- Agent: Lee-Roy Newton
- Height: 1.73 m (5 ft 8 in)

Sport
- Country: South Africa
- Sport: Athletics
- Event: Sprints
- Coached by: Werner Prinsloo

Achievements and titles
- World finals: 2019; 4x100 m, 5th 2022; 4x100 m, 6th
- Personal bests: 100 m: 10.04 (Pretoria, 2022); 200 m: 19.69 NR (Pretoria, 2018); 300 m: 31.61 WU20B (Ostrava, 2017)
Medal record
Men's athletics
Representing South Africa
World Relays
Disqualified	2021 Chorzów	4×100 m relay
African Championships
Bronze medal – third place	2022 Mauritius	200 m
African U20 Championships
Gold medal – first place	2017 Tlemcen	200 m

Clarence Munyai (born 20 February 1998) is a South African sprinter. He is the current South African record holder in the 200 metres, with a time of 19.69, set on 16 March 2018 at the South African national championships. He is ranked 16th in the world for 200 metres and tied for 11th for 300 metres. He competed in the men's 200 metres at the 2016 Summer Olympics. He finished 3rd in his heat with a time of 20.66 seconds and did not qualify for the semifinals.

He competed in the men's 200 metres and the men's 4 x 100 metres relay at the 2020 Summer Olympics.

Munyai competed at the 2026 Enhanced Games.

== Statistics ==
=== Personal bests ===
Event	Time	Competition	Venue	Date	Notes
100 metres	10.04	AGN Championships	Pretoria, South Africa	12 March 2022	A
200 metres	19.69	South African Championships	Pretoria, South Africa	16 March 2018	A NR
300 metres	31.61	Golden Spike	Ostrava, Czech Republic	28 June 2017	WJR
4 × 100 metres relay	37.65	IAAF World Athletics Championships	Doha, Qatar	4 October 2019	A NR

=== Season's bests ===
Year	100 metres	200 metres
2014	10.77	21.61
2015	10.56	20.77
2016	10.28	20.36
2017	10.20	20.10
2018	10.10	19.69
2019	10.31	20.04
2020	10.22	20.23
2021	10.25	20.49
2022	10.04	20.33

=== International competitions ===
Year	Competition	Venue	Position	Event	Notes
Representing South Africa
2016	African Championships	Durban, South Africa	10th (sf)	200 m	20.99 Q
2016	African Championships	Durban, South Africa	3rd (h)	4 × 100 m relay	40.04
2016	World U20 Championships	Bydgoszcz, Poland	4th	200 m	20.77
2016	Olympic Games	Rio de Janeiro, Brazil	52nd (h)	200 m	20.66
2017	African U20 Championships	Tlemcen, Algeria	1st	200 m	20.22
2017	World Championships	London, England	–	200 m	DQ
2018	Commonwealth Games	Gold Coast, Australia	4th	200 m	20.58
2019	World Championships	Doha, Qatar	17th (sf)	200 m	20.55
2019	World Championships	Doha, Qatar	5th	4 × 100 m relay	37.73
2021	World Relays	Chorzów, Poland	1st	4 × 100 m relay	38.71
2021	Olympic Games	Tokyo, Japan	19th (sf)	200 m	20.49
2021	Olympic Games	Tokyo, Japan	–	4 × 100 m relay	DNF
2022	African Championships	Port Louis, Mauritius	3rd	200 m	20.69
2022	World Championships	Eugene, United States	44th (h)	100 m	10.47
2022	World Championships	Eugene, United States	6th	4 × 100 m relay	38.10
2023	World Championships	Budapest, Hungary	5th (h)	4 × 100 m relay	37.72

Qualified for the final, but did not start (DNS).

=== National titles ===
- South African Championships
  - 200 metres: 2016
- South African U23/U20/U18/U16 Championships
  - 200 metres: 2016

=== Track records ===
As of 10 September 2024, Munyai holds the following track records for 200 metres.

Location	Time	Windspeed m/s	Date
Cape Town	20.03	+ 2.3	22/04/2022
Germiston	20.33	+ 2.7	02/04/2016
Pretoria	19.69; NR	– 0.5	16/03/2018
