= Carvin Nkanata =

Kenyan-American sprinter

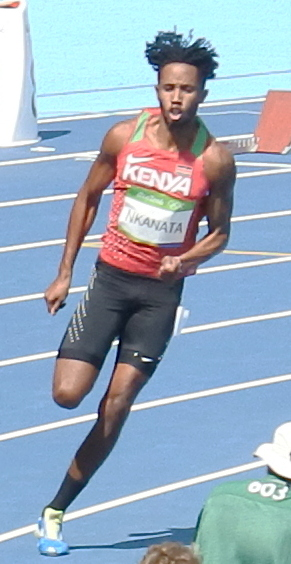
- Nkanata at the 2016 Olympics

Personal information
- Born: 6 May 1991 (age 35) Summerville, South Carolina, U.S.
- Education: University of Pittsburgh

Sport
- Sport: Athletics
- Event: 200 m

Achievements and titles
- Personal best: 20.14 (2015)
Medal record
Men's athletics
Representing Kenya
African Championships
Bronze medal – third place	2014 Marrakesh	200 m

Carvin Nkanata (born 6 May 1991) is a Kenyan-American athlete specialising in the sprinting events. He won the bronze medal in the 200 metres at the 2014 African Championships. His personal best in the 200 metres (20.14, set in 2015) is the current Kenyan record.

== Competition record ==
Year	Competition	Venue	Position	Event	Notes
Representing Kenya
2014	IAAF World Relays	Nassau, Bahamas	5th	4 × 200 m relay	1:22.35
2014	Commonwealth Games	Glasgow, United Kingdom	10th (sf)	200 m	20.65
2014	Commonwealth Games	Glasgow, United Kingdom	10th (h)	4 × 100 m relay	40.32
2014	African Championships	Marrakesh, Morocco	3rd	200 m	20.53
2015	World Championships	Beijing, China	27th (h)	200 m	20.43
2016	Olympic Games	Rio de Janeiro, Brazil	72nd (h)	200 m	21.43
