= Émilien Tchan Bi Chan =

Ivorian sprinter (born 1996)

Medal record

Men's athletics

Representing Ivory Coast

African Championships
Silver medal – second place	2016 Durban	4×100 m

Émilien Aurel Tchan Bi Chan (born 28 May 1996) is an Ivorian sprinter who specializes in the 100 and 200 metres.

As a part of the Ivorian 4 × 100 metres relay team he won a silver medal at the 2016 African Championships, a gold medal at the 2017 Jeux de la Francophonie and a bronze medal at the 2017 Islamic Solidarity Games.

Individually at the 2017 Jeux de la Francophonie, he finished 5th in the 100 metres and 7th in the 200 metres. He competed at the 2016 African Championships and the 2017 Islamic Solidarity Games without reaching the final.

His personal best times are 10.46 seconds in the 100 metres, achieved in July 2017 in Abidjan; and 21.33 seconds in the 200 metres, also achieved in July 2017 in Abidjan.

He will be competing for Indian Hills Community College in Ottumwa, Iowa for the upcoming 2021 track and field season.
