= Karabo Mothibi =

Botswana sprinter

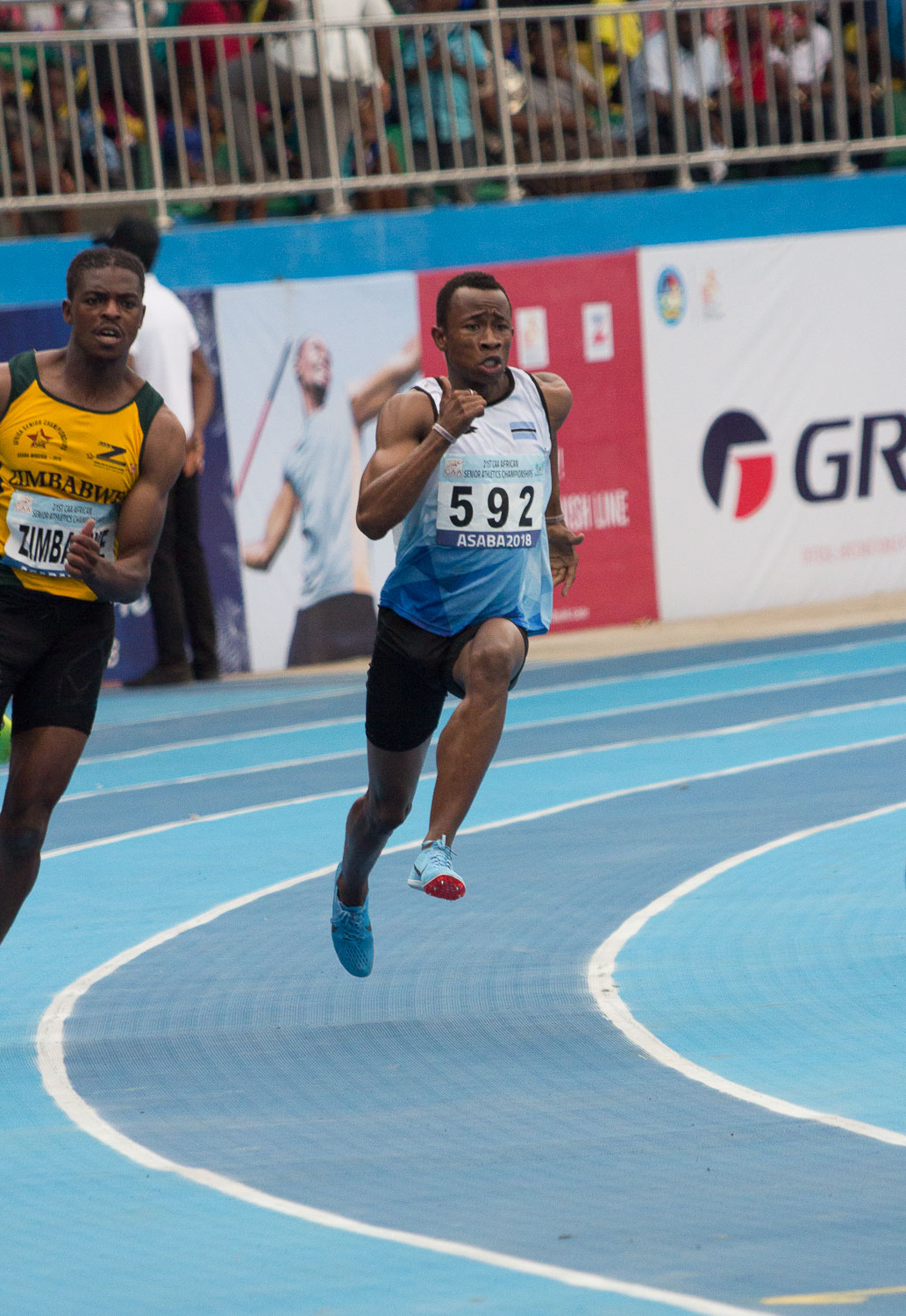
- Karabo Mothibi at the 2018 African Athletics Championships

Personal information
- Born: 15 October 1996 (age 29) Jwaneng, Botswana
- Height: 1.68 m (5 ft 6 in)
- Weight: 74 kg (163 lb)

Sport
- Sport: Athletics
- Event(s): 100 m, 200 m

Karabo Mothibi (born 15 October 1996) is a sprinter from Botswana.

== International competitions ==
Year	Competition	Venue	Position	Event	Notes
Representing Botswana
2013	World Youth Championships	Donetsk, Ukraine	19th (sf)	100 m	11.00
2013	World Youth Championships	Donetsk, Ukraine	59th (h)	200 m	22.47
2014	World Junior Championships	Eugene, United States	22nd (sf)	200 m	21.54
2014	World Junior Championships	Eugene, United States	10th (h)	4 × 100 m relay	40.53
2015	African Junior Championships	Addis Ababa, Ethiopia	2nd	4 × 100 m relay	40.95
2016	African Championships	Durban, South Africa	6th	100 m	10.36 (w)
2016	African Championships	Durban, South Africa	7th	4 × 100 m relay	40.40
2018	Commonwealth Games	Gold Coast, Australia	23rd (h)	100 m	10.42
2018	African Championships	Asaba, Nigeria	8th	100 m	10.55
2018	African Championships	Asaba, Nigeria	15th (sf)	200 m	21.31
2019	African Games	Rabat, Morocco	15 (sf)	100 m	10.55
2019	African Games	Rabat, Morocco	23rd (h)	200 m	21.25
2019	African Games	Rabat, Morocco	5th	4 × 100 m relay	39.52
2021	World Relays	Chorzów, Poland	13th (h)	4 × 100 m relay	39.55

Did not start in the final

== Personal bests ==
Outdoor

- 100 metres – 10.16 (Francistown 2016)
- 200 metres – 20.70 (+1.4 m/s, Gaborone 2016)
