= Gabriel Mvumvure =

Zimbabwean athlete

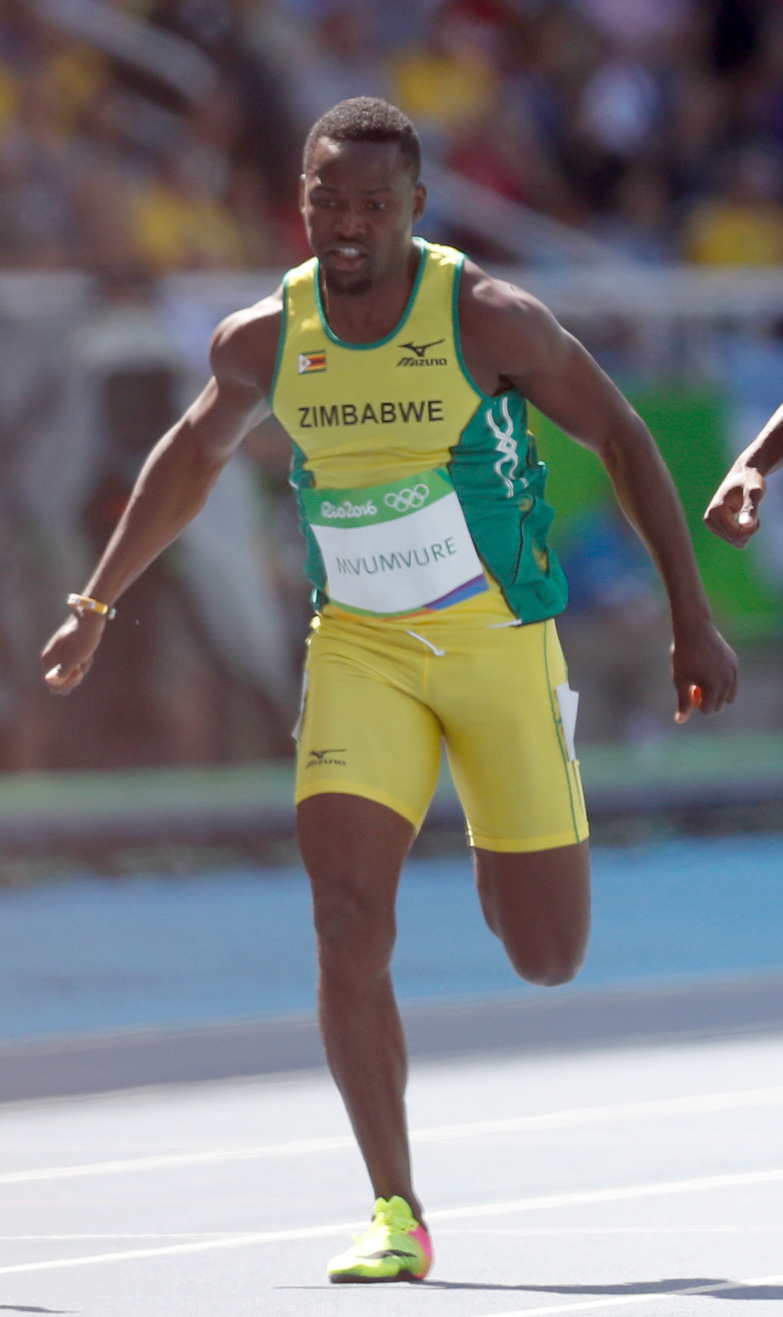
- Mvumvure at the 2016 Olympics

Personal information
- Born: 23 February 1988 (age 38) Harare, Zimbabwe
- Education: Louisiana State University
- Height: 1.70 m (5 ft 7 in)
- Weight: 70 kg (150 lb)

Sport
- Sport: Athletics
- Events: 60 m, 100 m, 200 m
- College team: LSU Tigers

Gabriel Mvumvure (born 23 February 1988) is a Zimbabwean sprinter. He represented his country at three outdoor and two indoor World Championships.

== Personal bests ==
Outdoor

- 100 metres – 9.98 (+1.9 m/s, Montverde 2013)
- 200 metres – 20.67 (+1.8 m/s, Coral Gables 2011)

Indoor

- 60 metres – 6.60 (Sopot 2014)
- 200 metres – 20.96 (Fayetteville 2011)

== Competition record ==
Year	Competition	Venue	Position	Event	Notes
Representing Zimbabwe
2006	World Junior Championships	Beijing, China	59th (h)	100 m	10.93
2006	World Junior Championships	Beijing, China	200 m	22.08	
2007	All-Africa Games	Algiers, Algeria	12th (sf)	100 m	10.50
2007	All-Africa Games	Algiers, Algeria	6th	200 m	21.22
2007	All-Africa Games	Algiers, Algeria	3rd	4 × 100 m relay	39.16
2007	African Junior Championships	Ouagadougou, Burkina Faso	1st	100 m	10.51
2007	African Junior Championships	Ouagadougou, Burkina Faso	1st	200 m	21.03
2009	World Championships	Berlin, Germany	59th (h)	200 m	22.67
2011	World Championships	Daegu, South Korea	43rd (h)	100 m	10.63
2011	World Championships	Daegu, South Korea	41st (h)	200 m	21.11
2013	World Championships	Moscow, Russia	19th (h)	100 m	10.21
2014	World Indoor Championships	Sopot, Poland	11th (sf)	60 m	6.60
2016	World Indoor Championships	Portland, United States	19th (sf)	60 m	6.68
2016	African Championships	Durban, South Africa	11th (sf)	100 m	10.39
2016	African Championships	Durban, South Africa	4th	200 m	20.83
2016	Olympic Games	Rio de Janeiro, Brazil	37th (h)	100 m	10.28
