= Titus Kafunda =

Zambian sprinter (born 1993)

Medal record

Men's athletics

Representing Zambia

African Championships
Bronze medal – third place	2016 Durban	4×100 m

Titus Kafunda Mukhala (born 3 August 1993) is a Zambian sprinter who specialized in the 100 and 200 metres. He is best known for winning a bronze medal in relay at the 2016 African Championships.

== 100 metres ==
Having competed overseas since 2011, Kafunda spent time in Switzerland in 2013–14. During his time in Switzerland, he qualified for the 2014 Commonwealth Games "by European standards". Following good times posted at the IAAF World Challenge in Dakar in 2015, Kafunda was invited to Germany along with Sydney Siame.

In the 100 metres, Kafunda finished sixth at the 2011 African Junior Championships. He also competed at the 2010 African Championships, the 2012 African Championships,the 2012 World Junior Championships, the 2014 Commonwealth Games, the 2014 African Championships, the 2015 African Games, the 2016 African Championships and the 2018 African Championships without reaching the final.

== 200 metres ==
In the 200 metres, Kafunda finished eighth at the 2011 African Junior Championships. He also competed at the 2010 African Championships, the 2012 African Championships, the 2012 World Junior Championships, the 2014 Commonwealth Games and the 2014 African Championships without reaching the final.

His personal best times are 10.26 in the 100 metres, achieved in July 2013 in Bulle; and 20.88 seconds in the 200 metres, achieved in August 2014 in Marrakesh.

== Relay ==
In the relay, Kafunda finished eighth at the 2010 African Championships (4 × 100), eighth at the 2014 Commonwealth Games (4 × 400), won a bronze medal with 2016 African Championships (4 × 100) and finished fourth at the 2018 African Championships (4 × 400). He also competed at the 2015 African Games without reaching the final. The time of 39.31 seconds that the team achieved here is nonetheless the Zambian record.
