= Mlandvo Shongwe =

Swazi sprinter (born 1993)

Mlandvo Shongwe (born 20 September 1993) is a Swazi sprinter who specializes in the 100 and 200 metres.

He reached the B final of the 200 metres at the 2010 Youth Olympics. He competed 100 and 200 metres event at the 2014 Commonwealth Games without reaching the semi-final, and at the 2015 African Games he competed 100 metres and 200 metres in semi-final. At the 2016 African Championships he reached the semi-final in the 100 metres but missed the final of the 4 × 100 metres relay.

His personal best times are 10.57 seconds in the 100 metres, achieved in May 2016 in Bloemfontein; and 21.32 seconds in the 200 metres, achieved at the 2015 African Games in Brazzaville.
