= Gift Leotlela =

South African sprinter

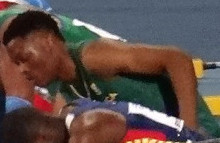
- Leotlela in 2016

Personal information
- Nationality: South Africa
- Born: 12 May 1998 (age 28) Phuthaditjhaba, South Africa
- Height: 1.78 m (5 ft 10 in)
- Weight: 74 kg (163 lb)

Sport
- Sport: Athletics
- Event: Sprint
- Coached by: Werner Prinsloo

Achievements and titles
- Personal bests: 100 m: 9.87 (2025); 150 m: 15.37 (2020); 200 m: 20.20 (2017)
Medal record
Men's athletics
Representing South Africa
World Relays
Disqualified	2021 Chorzów	4×100 m
African Championships
Gold medal – first place	2016 Durban	4×100 m
- Updated on 27 August 2016

Tlotliso Gift Leotlela (born 12 May 1998) is a South African sprinter. He competed at the 2016 Summer Olympics in the men's 200 metres race; his time of 20.59 seconds in the heats did not qualify him for the semifinals.

He competed at the 2020 Summer Olympics in the men's 100 metres event.

== International competitions ==
Year	Competition	Venue	Position	Event	Notes
Representing South Africa
2015	African Youth Championships	Reduit, Mauritius	1st	100 m	10.38 (w)
2015	African Youth Championships	Reduit, Mauritius	1st	200 m	20.84
2015	African Youth Championships	Reduit, Mauritius	1st	Medley relay	1:53.60
2015	Commonwealth Youth Games	Apia, Samoa	1st	100 m	10.20
2015	Commonwealth Youth Games	Apia, Samoa	1st	200 m	20.56 (w)
2016	African Championships	Durban, South Africa	4th	100 m	10.24
2016	African Championships	Durban, South Africa	1st	4 × 100 m relay	38.84
2016	World U20 Championships	Bydgoszcz, Poland	4th	100 m	10.28
2016	World U20 Championships	Bydgoszcz, Poland	2nd	200 m	20.59
2016	Olympic Games	Rio de Janeiro, Brazil	42nd (h)	200 m	20.59
2021	World Relays	Chorzów, Poland	1st	4 × 100 m relay	38.71
2021	Olympic Games	Tokyo, Japan	11th (sf)	100 m	10.03
2022	World Championships	Eugene, United States	30th (h)	100 m	10.19
2022	World Championships	Eugene, United States	6th	4 × 100 m relay	38.10
2025	World Championships	Tokyo, Japan	5th	100 m	9.95
2026	Commonwealth Games	Glasgow, United Kingdom	4th	100 m	9.91
2026	World Ultimate Championship	Budapest, Hungary	6th	100 m	9.98
