= Wayde van Niekerk =

South African sprinter (born 1992)

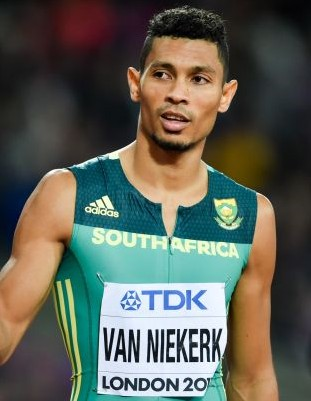
- van Niekerk at the 2017 World Championships

Personal information
- Nationality: South African
- Born: 15 July 1992 (age 34) Kraaifontein, Cape Province, South Africa
- Height: 1.83 m (6 ft 0 in)
- Weight: 70 kg (154 lb)
- Relative: Cheslin Kolbe (cousin)

Sport
- Sport: Track and field
- Event: Sprints
- Team: Adidas
- Coached by: Lance Brauman (2021–present); Anna Botha (2012–2021)

Achievements and titles
- Highest world ranking: 1st (400 m, 2023)
- Personal bests: 100 m: 9.94 (2017); 200 m: 19.84 (2017); 300 m: 30.81 NB (2017); 400 m: 43.03 WR (2016)
Medal record
Men's athletics
Representing South Africa
Olympic Games
| Gold medal – first place | 2016 Rio de Janeiro | 400 m |
World Championships
| Gold medal – first place | 2015 Beijing | 400 m |
| Gold medal – first place | 2017 London | 400 m |
| Silver medal – second place | 2017 London | 200 m |
| Bronze medal – third place | 2025 Tokyo | 4 × 400 m relay |
African Championships
| Gold medal – first place | 2016 Durban | 200 m |
| Gold medal – first place | 2016 Durban | 4 × 100 m relay |
| Silver medal – second place | 2014 Marrakesh | 400 m |
Commonwealth Games
| Silver medal – second place | 2014 Glasgow | 400 m |
Universiade
| Silver medal – second place | 2013 Kazan | 4 × 400 m relay |
Representing Africa
Continental Cup
| Gold medal – first place | 2014 Marrakesh | 4 × 400 m relay |

Wayde van Niekerk (South African English: /ˈweɪd fʌn niːˈkɛərk/, Afrikaans: [fan ˈnikærk]; born 15 July 1992) is a South African track and field sprinter who competes in the 200 and 400 metres. In the 400 metres, he is the current world and Olympic record holder, having set the record when he won the event at the 2016 Olympics.

Van Niekerk was the silver medallist in the 400 m at the 2014 Commonwealth Games and took silver in the 4 × 400 metres relay at the 2013 Summer Universiade. He also represented South Africa at the 2013 and 2015 Athletics World Championships. At the 2015 World Championships, he won the gold medal in the 400 metres. He defended his title two years later, in London, where he also won the silver medal in the 200 metres race.

In the 2016 Olympic Games men's 400 m, Van Niekerk won the gold medal with a world record time of 43.03 seconds, beating the time of 43.18 seconds set by Michael Johnson in 1999.

In 2016, Van Niekerk became the first sprinter in history to have run the 100 metres in under 10 seconds, 200 metres in under 20 seconds, and 400 metres in under 44 seconds. In 2017, after a 30.81 seconds victory in the seldom-run 300 metres distance, breaking Michael Johnson's world-best time of 30.85 which was set in 2000, Van Niekerk became the only sprinter in history to have run sub-10, sub-20, sub-31 and sub-44 performances at 100 m, 200 m, 300 m and 400 m respectively.

== Early life ==
Van Niekerk was born in Kraaifontein to Wayne van Niekerk and sprinter Odessa Swarts (née Krause). He was born prematurely and needed a blood transfusion. Van Niekerk attended Bellville Primary and Simonberg Primary until he and his mother moved to Bloemfontein in 2005. There he went to Grey College before going on to study marketing at the University of the Free State.

== Career ==
He made his international debut at the 2010 World Junior Championships in Athletics, where he placed fourth in the 200 m with a personal best time of 21.02 seconds. He also ran in the 4 × 100 metres relay heats with the national team, alongside Gideon Trotter. His senior breakthrough came at the age of eighteen at the 2011 South African Athletics Championships when he won the 200 m title in a new personal best time of 20.57 seconds. He competed in the same event at the 2011 African Junior Athletics Championships, but did not make the final. He ran sparingly in 2012 but began to show a talent for the 400 metres, setting a best time of 46.43 seconds.

The 2013 season marked Van Niekerk's emergence as a 400 m runner. He won the second national title of his career over that distance at the 2013 South African Championships, winning with a sub-46-second time. He won the IAAF Meeting de Dakar before travelling to Europe and placing second to Olympic champion Kirani James at the Golden Spike Ostrava, improving his best time to 45.09 seconds in the process. He entered the 400 metres at the 2013 Summer Universiade and narrowly missed out on the final as the fastest non-qualifier. He managed to reach the podium and receive his first international medal in the 4 × 400 metres relay as the South African men took the silver. His performances earned him a place in the 400 m at the 2013 World Championships, where he did not progress past the heats.

A national title win in April 2014 saw Van Niekerk top the world rankings with a best of 44.92 seconds—his first sub-45-second run. After a win at the FBK Games in the Netherlands, he ran at the New York Diamond League race and placed second to LaShawn Merritt. His time of 44.38 seconds was a new South African record, bettering Arnaud Malherbe and Hendrick Mokganyetsi's shared record from March 1999 and September 2000, respectively. A 200 m best of 20.19 seconds followed by a fourth-place finish at the Athletissima meet. He entered both sprint events at the 2014 Commonwealth Games and won his first individual senior medal over 400 m, placing behind Kirani James with a time of 44.68 seconds—his second-fastest run at that point. He reached the semi-final of the 200 m but did not repeat his success of the longer sprint.

2015 was the start of Van Niekerk's status as a sprinting phenom. On July 4, 2015, Van Niekerk lowered his South African record to below 44 seconds with a 43.96 at the Meeting Areva and ranked himself in the all-time top 12 whilst beating Kirani James for the first time. Ten days later, on July 14, 2015, he won a 200 m race at the Luzern Spitzen Leichtathletik in 19.94 seconds, his first 200 m run under 20 seconds. This also made him the second man in history to have gone under 20 seconds for the 200 m and 44 seconds for the 400 m. A month later, Van Niekerk represented South Africa at the 2015 World Championships in Athletics, focusing solely on the 400 m. Winning his heat, Van Niekerk beat LaShawn Merritt, with the defending champion taking second. The results repeated in the final, as he won gold in 43.48 seconds, making him the fourth-fastest runner of all time, ahead of Merritt who was running his personal best as the sixth-fastest in 43.65. Kirani James finished third in 43.78 seconds, a season's best.

On 12 March 2016, Van Niekerk became the 107th athlete to break the 10-second barrier in the 100 metres. That made him the first individual to break 10 seconds for 100 metres, 20 seconds for 200 metres, and 44 seconds for 400 metres. Van Niekerk qualified for the 2016 Summer Olympics and was the flag bearer for South Africa.

Van Niekerk won the gold medal in the 400 metres at the 2016 Summer Olympics with a world record time of 43.03 seconds, breaking Michael Johnson's set at the 1999 World Championships in Athletics. His reaction time was 0.181 s and he was aged 24 years and 30 days. Van Niekerk became the only man to have won the Olympic or world 400 metres from lane eight: usually, runners in this lane are at a disadvantage due to the staggered start. Van Niekerk's Olympic win set off a racial debate after a tweet storm when Coloured South Africans celebrated his win by creating a hashtag #ColouredExcellence. In November, he won the Association of National Olympic Committees Best Male Athlete of the Rio 2016 Olympics award.

On 8 August 2017, Van Niekerk successfully defended his 400 metres world title at the 2017 World Championships in Athletics in London with a time of 43.98 seconds. Two days later, he finished second in the 200 m in 20.11 seconds at the World Championships. He became the first South African athlete to land two individual sprint medals at a single meet.

On 7 October 2017, Van Niekerk participated in a celebrity tag rugby match at Newlands Stadium in Cape Town before a Rugby Championship test match. While playing, he made an inverted cut and tore his anterior cruciate ligament. He began treatment immediately after surgery, and due to this injury, he was unable to attend any meets during 2018. Van Niekerk had been in intense rehabilitation throughout 2018, to prepare himself for the beginning of the 2019 season and 2020 Tokyo Olympics. On 31 May 2019, it was announced that he would run at the IAAF Diamond League event in London in July, his first major race since his comeback from injury. He did not eventually compete in the 2019 World Championships and failed to reach the 400 m final in the 2020 Olympic Games but finished 5th in the 400 m final in the 2022 World Championships.

Van Niekerk was coached by Ans Botha, known to her athletes as Tannie Ans, Afrikaans for Aunty Ans, until 2021. His manager is Peet van Zyl. In 2021 he moved to the United States to train with the Pure Athletics training group in Florida, coached by Lance Brauman.

In the run-up to the 2024 Paris Olympics, Van Niekerk declined to compete in the 400 m race, instead focusing on the 200 m event. He finished last in the semifinals of that event in Paris.

== Personal life ==
Van Niekerk married Chesney Campbell on 29 October 2017. He is the cousin of South African World Cup-winning rugby union and rugby sevens player Cheslin Kolbe. He first started using his speed while playing rugby in junior school in Cape Town. He and his cousin, Kolbe, were on the same team. More than 12 years later, they were both in the South African Olympic Team in Rio, with Kolbe playing in the Sevens.

Van Niekerk's biological parents are divorced, and he was living with his mother, Odessa Swarts and step-father Steven Swarts, in Bloemfontein as of 2016. His sister, Kayla Swarts, is an international hockey player at the FIH Nations Cup and at Junior Africa cup.

He is a Christian, tweeting "Jesus Did It" and "GOD IS POWER" after setting the world record for the 400 metres. He is also an avid supporter of Premier League club Liverpool F.C.

== Statistics ==
Information from World Athletics profile, unless otherwise noted.

=== Personal bests ===
| Event | Time | Venue | Date | Notes |
|---|---|---|---|---|
| 100 m | 9.94 | Velenje, Slovenia | 20 June 2017 | |
| 200 m | 19.84 | Kingston, Jamaica | 10 June 2017 | Former NR |
| 300 m | 30.81 | Ostrava, Czech Republic | 28 June 2017 | National Best |
| 400 m | 43.03 | Rio de Janeiro, Brazil | 14 August 2016 | WR, OR |
| 4 × 100 m relay | 38.84 | Durban, South Africa | 24 June 2016 | |
| 4 × 400 m relay | 3:00.02 | Marrakesh, Morocco | 14 September 2014 | |

=== 400 metre world record split times ===
Van Niekerk ran the opening 200 metres in 20.54 seconds and the closing 200 metres in 22.49 seconds, giving a differential of 1.95 seconds. The 100-metre-long-section beginning after the first 100 metres was completed in 9.78 seconds.

=== International championship results ===
| Year | Competition | Venue | Position | Event | Time | Notes |
Representing South Africa and Africa (Continental Cup only)
| 2010 | World Junior Championships | Moncton, New Brunswick | 4th | 200 m | 21.02 | PB |
| 2010 | World Junior Championships | Moncton, New Brunswick | 11th | 4 × 100 m relay | 40.32 | PB |
| 2011 | African Junior Championships | Gaborone, Botswana | DNF | 200 m | — | |
| 2013 | Universiade | Kazan, Russia | 9th | 400 m | 46.39 | |
| 2013 | Universiade | Kazan, Russia | 2nd | 4 × 400 m relay | 3:06.19 | PB |
| 2013 | World Championships | Moscow, Russia | 26th | 400 m | 46.37 | |
| 2014 | Commonwealth Games | Glasgow, Scotland | 2nd | 400 m | 44.68 | |
| 2014 | Commonwealth Games | Glasgow, Scotland | 13th | 200 m | 20.69 | |
| 2014 | African Championships | Marrakesh, Morocco | 2nd | 400 m | 45.00 | |
| 2014 | Continental Cup | Marrakesh, Morocco | 4th | 400 m | 45.27 | |
| 2014 | Continental Cup | Marrakesh, Morocco | 1st | 4 × 400 m relay | 3:00.02 | PB |
| 2015 | World Championships | Beijing, China | 1st | 400 m | 43.48 | WL, NR, PB |
| 2016 | African Championships | Durban, South Africa | 1st | 4 × 100 m relay | 38.84 | PB |
| 2016 | African Championships | Durban, South Africa | 1st | 200 m | 20.02 | SB |
| 2016 | Olympic Games | Rio de Janeiro, Brazil | 1st | 400 m | 43.03 | WR, OR |
| 2017 | World Championships | London, England | 1st | 400 m | 43.98 | |
| 2017 | World Championships | London, England | 2nd | 200 m | 20.11 | |
| 2021 | Olympic Games | Tokyo, Japan | 12th (sf) | 400 m | 45.14 | |
| 2022 | World Championships | Eugene, United States | 5th | 400 m | 44.97 | |
| 2023 | World Championships | Budapest, Hungary | 7th | 400 m | 45.11 | |
| 2024 | Olympic Games | Paris, France | 20th (sf) | 200 m | 20.72 | |
| 2025 | World Championships | Tokyo, Japan | 11th (sf) | 200 m | 20.12 | |
| 2025 | World Championships | Tokyo, Japan | 3rd | 4 × 400 m relay | 2:57.83 | |

=== Circuit wins ===
- Diamond League (400 m; Other events specified in parentheses)
  - Birmingham: 2015 (300 m)
  - New York: 2015
  - Paris: 2015
  - London: 2015
  - Rome: 2016
  - Monaco: 2016, 2017
  - Lausanne: 2017
  - Silesia: 2023
  - Oslo: 2023
  - London: 2023

=== Seasonal bests ===
The three highlighted times are track records. Van Niekerk also holds a fourth track record. He ran 43.73 seconds at Monaco in July 2017.

| Year | 200 metres | 400 metres |
|---|---|---|
| 2010 | 21.02 | — |
| 2011 | 20.57 | — |
| 2012 | 20.91 | 46.43 |
| 2013 | 20.84 | 45.09 |
| 2014 | 20.19 | 44.38 |
| 2015 | 19.94 | 43.48 (Beijing) |
| 2016 | 20.02 | 43.03 (Rio de Janeiro) |
| 2017 | 19.84 | 43.62 (Lausanne) |
| 2018 | — | — |
| 2019 | — | 47.28 |
| 2020 | 20.31 | 45.58 |
| 2021 | 20.38 | 44.56 |
| 2022 | — | 44.33 |
| 2023 | — | 44.08 <diamond league silesia> |
| 2024 | 20.29 | 44.74 |
| 2025 | 20.07 | 44.91 |

=== National titles ===
- South African Championships
  - 200 metres: 2011, 2017, 2021
  - 400 metres: 2013, 2014, 2015, 2016
- South African Junior Championships
  - 100 metres: 2011
  - 200 metres: 2011

Records
| Preceded by (United States) Michael Johnson | Men's 400 metres world record holder 14 August 2016 – present | Incumbent |
| Preceded by (Botswana) Isaac Makwala | Men's 400 metres African record holder 26 August 2015 – present | Incumbent |
Achievements
| Preceded by (Grenada) Kirani James | Men's 400 metres season's best 2015, 2016, 2017 | Succeeded by (United States) Michael Norman |
Awards
| Preceded by (United States) Ashton Eaton | Men's Track & Field News Athlete of the Year; 2016 | Succeeded by (Qatar) Mutaz Essa Barshim |
Olympic Games
| Preceded by Caster Semenya | Flagbearer for South Africa; Rio de Janeiro 2016 | Succeeded by Connor Wilson |
