= Martin Owusu-Antwi =

Ghanaian sprinter (born 1995)

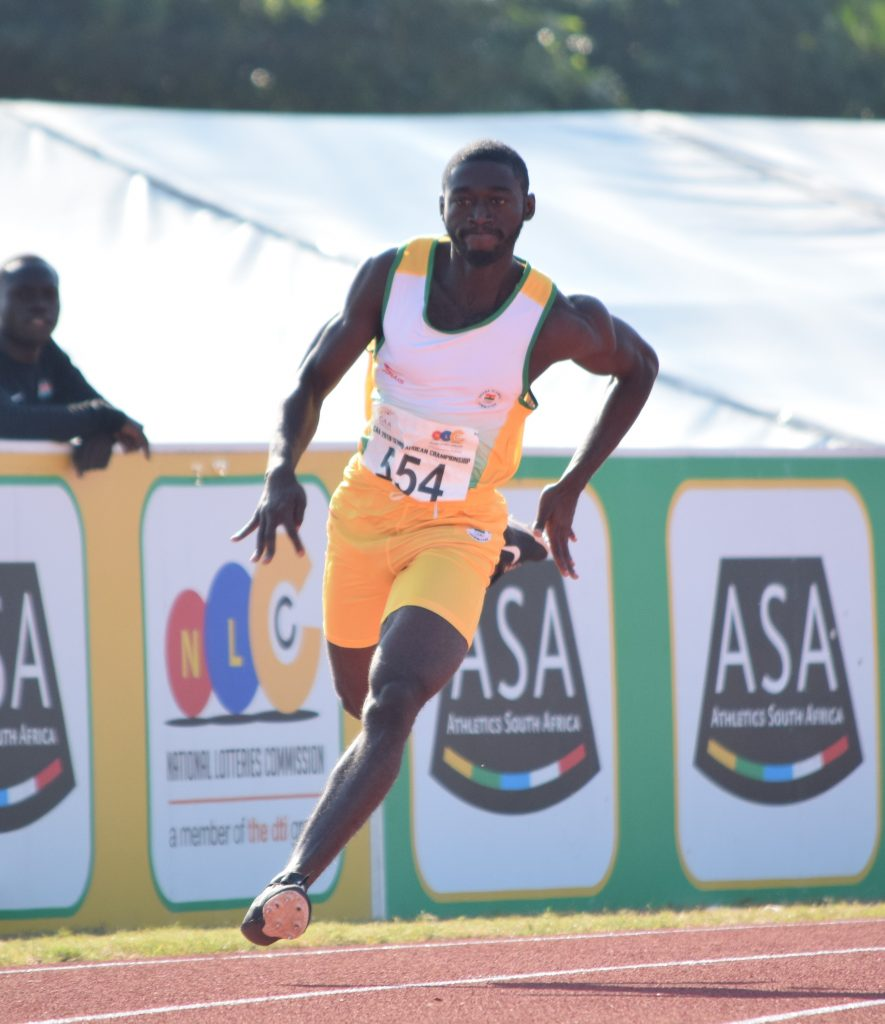

Personal information
- Full name: Martin Owusu-Antwi
- Born: 15 April 1995 (age 31) Kumasi, Ghana
- Height: 5 ft 07in (170 cm)
- Weight: 152 (69 kg)

Sport
- Country: Ghana
- Sport: Track and field
- Events: 100 m, 4 × 100 m, 200 m
- College team: Coppin State Eagles

Achievements and titles
- Personal best: 60 m: 6.84 s (25 February 2018) 100 m: 10.45 s (11 May 2019) 200 m: 20.79 s (25 February 2018) 200 m: 20.70 s (24 May 2019)
Medal record
Men's athletics
Representing Ghana
African Games
Gold medal – first place	2019 Rabat	4 × 100 m relay

Martin Owusu-Antwi (born 15 April 1995) is a Ghanaian sprinter specializing in the 100 meters and 200 meters. He gained his first international experience in the 2015 Summer Universiade in Gwangju and also in the Ghana 4 × 100 meters relay. He also took part in the 2018 Commonwealth Games in the Australian Gold Coast running in the 200 meter race. He then went on to participate for the first time in the African Games in Rabat where he reached the semifinals and won his first Gold medal in the Men's 4 × 100 metres relay.

== Athletics ==
Martin Owusu-Antwi won his first international experience at the 2015 Summer Universiade in Gwangju, where he was eliminated in the 100-meter race with 10.97 seconds in the quarterfinals and with the Ghana 4-by-100-meter relay with 39, Eliminated in the preliminary round in 99s. The following year he retired from the Durban African Championship in the 200-meter race with 21.02 s in the semi-finals and finished sixth in the relay in 40.21 s. In 2018 he participated in the Commonwealth Games on the Australian Gold Coast, over 200 meters, and there he reached the semifinals, where he was eliminated with 25.95 seconds. In 2019 he participated for the first time in the African Games in Rabat and reached the semifinals of more than 200 meters, in which he was eliminated with 20.97 s and won the gold medal with the relay with a new player record of 38, 30 s. This gave him a starting place in the Doha World Championship relay, in which 38.24 seconds were not enough for a final. Martin Owusu-Antwi is a student at Coppin State University in Baltimore.

== Personal bests ==
- 100 meters: 10.45 s (+0.6 m/s), 11 May 2019 in Charlotte
- 60 meters (hall): 6.72 s, 25 February 2018 in Boston
- 200 meters: 20.70 s (+0.3 m/s), 24 May 2019 in Jacksonville
- 200 meters (hall): 20.79 s, 25 February 2018 in Boston

== International competitions ==
Year	Competition	Country	Event	Result	Time
2015	Summer Universiade	(South Korea) Gwangju	100 m floors	Quarter Finals	10"79
2015	Summer Universiade	(South Korea) Gwangju	4 × 100 m	Batteria	39"99
2016	African Championships	(South Africa) Durban	200 m floors	Semifinal	21"02
2016	African Championships	(South Africa) Durban	4 × 100 m	6º	40"21
2018	Commonwealth Games	(Australia) Gold Coast	200 m floors	Semifinal	25"95
2019	African Games	(Morocco) Rabat	200 m floors	Semifinal	20"97
2019	African Games	(Morocco) Rabat	4 × 100 m	Gold	38"30
2019	World Athletics Championships	(Qatar) Doha	4 × 100 m	Batteria	38"24

== Collegiate competitions ==
=== Representing Coppin State Eagles ===
Year	Competition	Position	Event	Time	Wind	Venue
2019	NCAA Division I Outdoor Track & Field Championships	12th	4 × 100	39.24	N/A	Austin, United States
2019	Conference USA Outdoor Championships	3rd	100 m	10.49	+1.1	Charlotte, United States
2019	Conference USA Outdoor Championships	2nd	100 m	10.45	+0.6	Charlotte, United States
2019	Conference USA Outdoor Championships	2nd	200 m	20.87	-0.1	Charlotte, United States
2019	Conference USA Outdoor Championships	1st	4 × 100	39.35	N/A	Charlotte, United States
2019	Conference USA Outdoor Championships	1st	4 × 100	3:14:50	N/A	Charlotte, United States
2019	NCAA Division I East Region Preliminary Rounds	16th	200 m	20.73	+1.4	Jacksonville, United States
2019	NCAA Division I East Region Preliminary Rounds	19th	200 m	20.70	+0.3	Jacksonville, United States
2019	NCAA Division I East Region Preliminary Rounds	10th	4 × 100	39.22	N/A	Jacksonville, United States
2019	NCAA Division I East Region Preliminary Rounds	2nd	4 × 100	3:04.09	N/A	Jacksonville, United States
