= Seye Ogunlewe (athlete) =

Nigerian sprinter (born 1991)

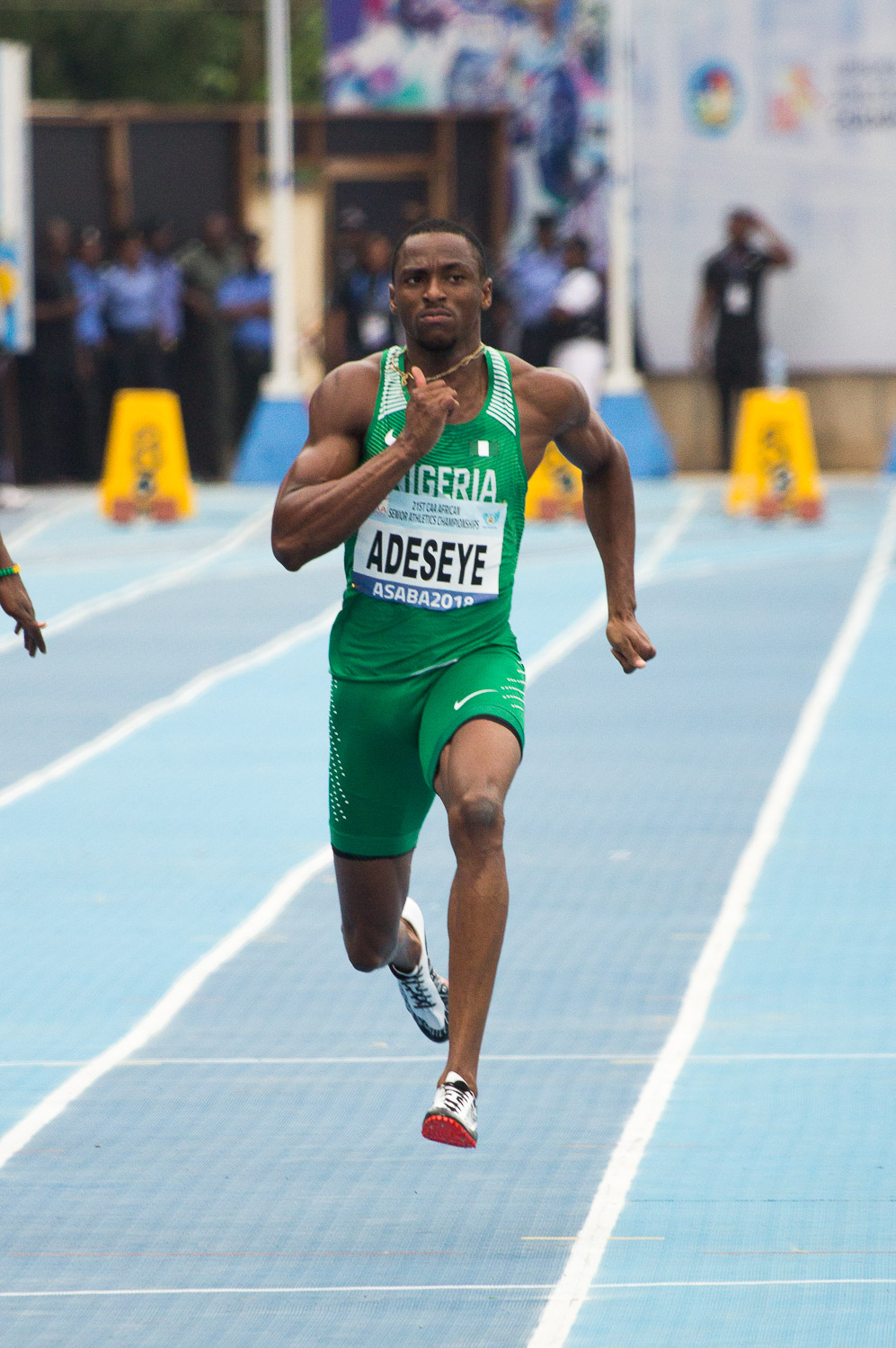
- Seye Ogunlewe at the 2018 African Championships

Personal information
- Full name: Adeseye Akinola Ogunlewe
- Born: 30 August 1991 (age 34) Lagos, Nigeria
- Education: The King's Hospital; University of Essex
- Height: 1.89 m (6 ft 2 1/2 in)
- Weight: 84 kg (185 lb)

Sport
- Country: Nigeria
- Sport: Sprint
- Event: 100 m

Achievements and titles
- Personal best: 100 m: 10.03 s (2024)
Medal record
Men's athletics
Representing Nigeria
African Championships
Silver medal – second place	2018 Asaba	4×100 m
- Updated on 27 February 2019

Adeseye "Seye" Akinola Ogunlewe (born 30 August 1991) is a Nigerian track and field sprinter who specialises in the 100 metres. He was a finalist in the 100 m and 4 × 100 m at the 2015 All-Africa Games. He won the 100 m at the Nigerian Championships in 2015 and 2016.

== Early life and education ==
He was born on 30 August 1991, in Lagos, the last child of Adeseye and Kemi Ogunlewe. He attended Atlantic Hall School, Epe. He initially started out playing football but was advised to sprint by his teacher. He moved to Ireland in 2008 and won the Irish Schools Championships in 2009 and 2010.

== Career ==
He placed second in the 60 m at the British Universities & Colleges Sport (BUCS) Indoor championships in 2011 behind Sven Knipphals. He remained the second-place finisher in 2012 and 2013 but eventually won the title in 2014. He was also the 2013 BUCS champion in the 100 m. In 2014, he was not successful in defending his title as he placed second behind Adam Gemili.

Ogunlewe represented his country at the 2014 Commonwealth Games, running in the 200 m. He finished 4th in his heat and did not progress to the semifinals. He ran the anchor leg for Nigeria in the 4 × 100 m final at the 2015 Brazzaville African Games. The team finished second but were eventually disqualified for a faulty baton change.

At the 2016 Nigerian Championships, he successfully defended his national title. He won the 100 m in a personal best of 10.12 s ahead of Divine Oduduru and Ogho-oghene Egwero, and thereby qualified for the Rio Olympic Games. After the championships, he used social media to lament the insufficient support of athletes by Nigerian organisations. In 2019, he improved on his best time by recording a new personal record of 10.11.
