= Jonathan Permal =

Mauritian sprinter

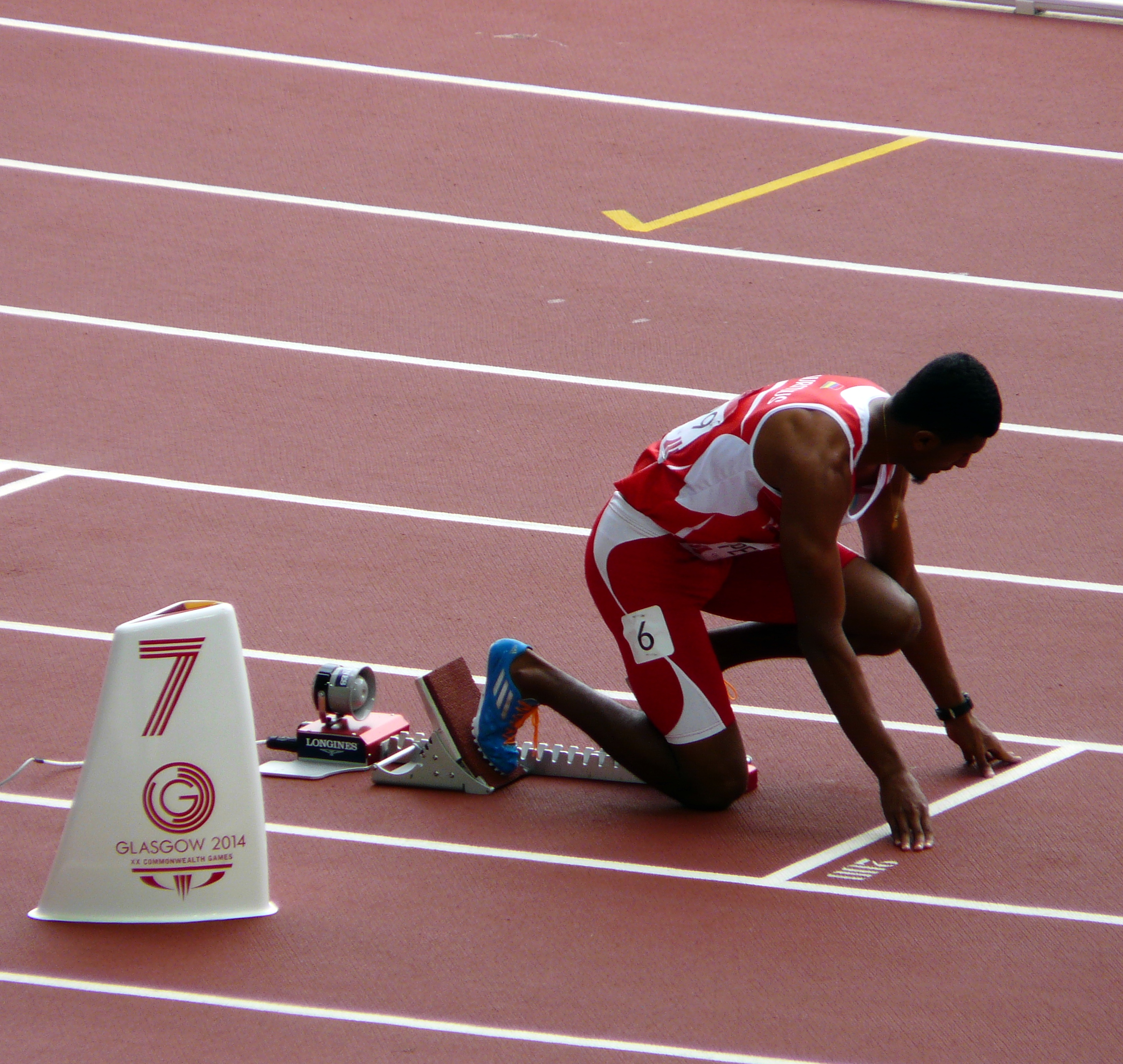
Jonathan Permal at the 2014 Commonwealth Games

Jonathan Olivier Permal (born 15 January 1994 in Flacq District) is a Mauritian track and field athlete competing in the 100 metres and 200 metres. At the 2013 Jeux de la Francophonie, he won a bronze medal in the 200 m. He also reached the semifinals of both the 100 m and 200 m at the 2014 African Athletics Championships in Marrakesh, Morocco.

Permal is the third fastest Mauritian sprinter in the 200 m with a time of 20.85 seconds after Stephan Buckland's 20.06 and Eric Milazar's 20.66. He retired from track and field and is working at Four Seasons Resort in Anahiti.

== Personal bests ==
Event	Time	Date	Venue
100 metres	10.46	27 August 2014	Glasgow, United Kingdom
200 metres	20.85	27 August 2014	Marrakesh, Morocco
4 x 100 meter relay	39.98	15 September 2015	Brazzaville, Republic of the Congo

== International competition record ==
Year	Competition	Venue	Position	Event	Notes
2011	World Youth Championships	Lille, France	6th (heats)	100 m	11.28
2011	World Youth Championships	Lille, France	3rd (heats)	200 m	22.01
2011	Commonwealth Youth Games	Douglas, Isle of Man	4th (heats)	100 m	11.12
2011	Commonwealth Youth Games	Douglas, Isle of Man	5th	200 m	21.96
2012	World Junior Championships	Barcelona, Spain	4th (heats)	200 m	21.58
2013	African Junior Championships	Bambous, Mauritius	3rd	100 m	10.65
2013	African Junior Championships	Bambous, Mauritius	2nd	200 m	21.26
2013	African Junior Championships	Bambous, Mauritius	2nd	4 × 100 m relay	40.86
2013	Jeux de la Francophonie	Nice, France	3rd	200 m	21.35
2014	Commonwealth Games	Glasgow, United Kingdom	3rd (heats)	100 m	10.46
2014	Commonwealth Games	Glasgow, United Kingdom	4th (heats)	200 m	21.21
2014	African Championships	Marrakesh, Morocco	5th (semis)	100 m	10.49
2014	African Championships	Marrakesh, Morocco	5th (semis)	200 m	20.85
