= Moulaye Sonko =

Senegalese sprinter

Moulaye Sonko (born 1 March 1988) is a Senegalese sprinter who specializes in the 100 and 200 meters.

In the 100 meters he competed at the 2013 Summer Universiade, the 2014 African Championships, the 2015 Summer Universiade, the 2015 African Games, the 2016 African Championships and the 2017 Jeux de la Francophonie without reaching the semi-final or the final.

In the 200 meters he competed at the 2013 Summer Universiade (quarter-final), the 2014 African Championships and the 2015 Summer Universiade (quarter-final).

As a part of the Senegalese 4 × 100 meters relay team he finished seventh at the 2014 African Championships and fourth at the 2016 African Championships.

His personal best times are 10.34 seconds in the 100 meters, achieved in June 2017 in Bamako; and 21.21 seconds in the 200 meters, achieved in April 2014 in Abidjan.
