= Mark Odhiambo =

Kenyan sprinter

Personal information
- Full name: Mark Otieno Odhiambo
- Born: 11 May 1993 (age 33) Kajiado County, Kenya
- Height: 210 cm (6 ft 11 in) (2018)
- Weight: 75 kg (165 lb) (2018)

Sport
- Sport: Athletics
- Events: 100 metres, 200 metres
- Coached by: Andrew Kock (South Africa)
Medal record
Men's athletics
Representing Kenya
World Relays
Silver medal – second place	2021 Silesia	4×200 metres relay
Kenyan Championships
Gold medal – first place	2015	100 metres
Gold medal – first place	2016	100 metres
Gold medal – first place	2017	100 metres
Gold medal – first place	2017	200 metres
Gold medal – first place	2018	100 metres
Gold medal – first place	2018	200 metres
Silver medal – second place	2024	100 metres

Mark Otieno Odhiambo (born 11 May 1993) is a Kenyan sprinter who specializes in the 100 metres and 200 metres. He is a multi-time national champion and represented Kenya at the 2017 World Championships and the 2020 Summer Olympics.

== Early life ==
Otieno was born and raised in Kajiado County, a region traditionally known for distance runners. Despite this, he focused on sprinting and quickly emerged as one of Kenya's top talents in the discipline.

== Career ==
=== Early career and 2014 season ===
In 2014, Otieno began gaining attention in Kenyan sprinting. He reached the semifinals at the Kenyan National Championships and won bronze in the 100 metres at the East African Athletics Championships with a time of 10.45 seconds.

=== 2015–2016: International competitions and national success ===
Otieno represented Kenya at the 2015 IAAF World Relays in Nassau, Bahamas, in the 4 × 200 metres relay.

Later in 2015, he competed at the African Games in Brazzaville, advancing to the 100 metres semifinals with 10.56 seconds.

In 2016, he ran in Kenya's 4 × 100 metres relay team at the African Championships in Durban, finishing fifth in the final (39.97s). He also finished second in the national 100 metres final behind Mike Mokamba (10.39s).

=== 2017–2020: World Championships and Olympic qualification ===
At the 2017 World Championships in London, Otieno ran 10.40 seconds in the 100 metres preliminaries and 10.37 seconds in the heats. He also clocked 20.74 seconds in the 200 metres.

In 2018, he competed at the African Championships in Asaba, Nigeria.

He qualified for the 2020 Tokyo Olympics by running a personal best of 10.05 seconds.

=== 2021–present: Comeback and continued competition ===
Otieno was part of the Kenyan 4 × 200 metres relay team that won silver at the 2021 World Athletics Relays in Silesia.

In 2024, Otieno returned to strong form, clocking 10.42 seconds at the Athletics Kenya weekend meet and earned selection to the World Athletics Relays in Nassau. He currently trains under South African coach Andrew Kock, whose technical guidance has been pivotal to his resurgence.

Later that year, he finished second in the 100 metres final at the Kenyan National Championships with a time of 10.37 seconds. He ended the season with a 10.12-second mark and currently ranks as the second-fastest Kenyan sprinter behind Ferdinand Omanyala.

== Personal bests ==
- 100m: 10.05 seconds (17 June 2021)
- 200m: 20.41 seconds (10 June 2021)
