= Fabrice Dabla =

Togolese sprinter (born 1992)

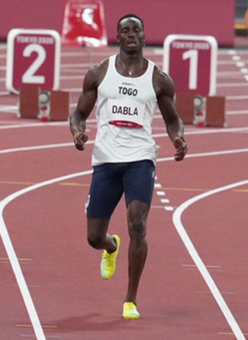
- Fabrice Dabla in 2021

Personal information
- Nationality: Togo
- Born: Fabrice Dabla; 30 November 1992 (age 33)

Sport
- Sport: Track and Field
- Events: 100m, 200m

Achievements and titles
- Personal bests: 100 m: 10.36 (2021); 200 m: 20.98 (2017)

Kokoutse Fabrice Dabla (born 20 November 1992) is an athlete from Togo who represented his country at the 2016 and 2020 Summer Olympics.

He competed in the 2016 Men's 200 metres track race, but finished seventh in his heat with a time of 21.63 seconds and did not advance. Although there were eight entrants in the heat, Kenyan Mike Nyang'au did not start, meaning Dabla finished last among those who did. He fared better in the Athletics at the 2020 Summer Olympics – Men's 100 metres in which he qualified from the preliminary races in a time of 10.57 seconds.
