= 2016 African Championships in Athletics =

2016 African Championships
- Dates: 22 June – 26 June
- Host city: Durban, South Africa
- Venue: Kings Park Stadium
- Events: 44
- Records set: Championship records

The 20th African Championships in Athletics was held in Durban, South Africa from 22 to 26 June 2016. It was the second time that Durban and South Africa hosted this competition. 720 athletes from 43 African national federations participated.

== Medal summary ==
=== Men ===
Chronology: 2012 | 2014 | 2016 | 2018 | 2020

Event	Gold		Silver		Bronze	
100 metres (wind: +2.4 m/s)	Ben Youssef Meïté; Ivory Coast	9.95	Mosito Lehata; Lesotho	10.04	Akani Simbine; South Africa	10.05
200 metres (wind: +1.8 m/s)	Wayde van Niekerk; South Africa	20.02	Adama Jammeh; Gambia	20.45 NR	Emmanuel Matadi; Liberia	20.55
400 metres	Baboloki Thebe; Botswana	44.70	Karabo Sibanda; Botswana	45.40	Chidi Okezie; Nigeria	45.80
800 metres	Nijel Amos; Botswana	1:45.11	Jacob Rozani; South Africa	1:45.38	Reinhardt van Rensburg; South Africa	1:46.15
1500 metres	Fouad Elkaam; Morocco	3:39.49	Timothy Cheroiyet; Kenya	3:39.71	Vincent Letting; Kenya	3:40.78
5000 metres	Douglas Kipserem; Kenya	13:13.35	Elroy Gelant; South Africa	13:15.13	Mangata Ndiwa; Kenya	13:16.85
10,000 metres	Stephen Mokoka; South Africa	28:02.97	Wilfred Kimitei; Kenya	28:03.18	Namakwe Nkhasi; Lesotho	28:06.33
110 metres hurdles (wind: 0.0 m/s)	Antonio Alkana; South Africa	13.43 'CR'	Tyron Akins; Nigeria	13.74	Mohamed Koussi; Morocco	13.94
400 metres hurdles	Boniface Tumuti; Kenya	49.20	Amadou Ndiaye; Senegal	49.40	Haron Koech; Kenya	49.40
3000 metres steeplechase	Chala Beyo; Ethiopia	8:21.02	Tolosa Nurgi; Ethiopia	8:22.79	Abraham Kibiwot; Kenya	8:24.19
4 × 100 metres relay	South Africa; Emile Erasmus; Wayde van Niekerk; Tlotliso Leotlela; Akani Simbine	38.84	Ivory Coast; Arthur Cissé; Wilfried Koffi Hua; Émilien Tchan Bi Chan; Ben Youssef Meïté	38.98	Zambia; Hazemba Chidamba; Brian Kasinda; Titus Kafunda Mukhala; Sydney Siame	39.77
4 × 400 metres relay	Botswana; Karabo Sibanda; Baboloki Thebe; Onkabetse Nkobolo; Leaname Maotoanong	3:02.20	Kenya; Boniface Tumuti; Alphas Kishoyian; Boniface Mweresa; Haron Koech	3:04.25	South Africa; Jon Seeliger; Shaun de Jager; Ofentse Mogawane; LJ van Zyl	3:04.73
20 kilometres walk	Samuel Gathimba; Kenya	1:19:24 'CR', NR	Hassanine Sebei; Tunisia	1:20:57	Lebogang Shange; South Africa	1:21:41
High jump	Mathieu Sawe; Kenya	2.21	Keagan Fourie; South Africa	2.18	Fernand Djoumessi; Cameroon	2.15
Pole vault	Hichem Khalil Cherabi; Algeria	5.30 m	Mohamed Romdhana; Tunisia	5.20 m	Jordan Yamoah; Ghana	5.00 m
Long jump	Ruswahl Samaai; South Africa	8.40w	Luvo Manyonga; South Africa	8.23w	Ruri Rammkolodi; Botswana	7.90w
Triple jump	Tosin Oke; Nigeria	17.13 (+1.0 m/s)	Fabrice Zango; Burkina Faso	16.81 (+1.2 m/s)	Khotso Mokoena; South Africa	16.77 (+1.7 m/s)
Shot put	Jaco Engelbrecht; South Africa	20.00	Franck Elemba; Congo	19.89	Stephen Mozia; Nigeria	19.84
Discus throw	Russell Tucker; South Africa	61.44	Stephen Mozia; Nigeria	59.16	Dewaald van Heerden; South Africa	58.44
Hammer throw	Eslam Ahmed Taha Ibrahim; Egypt	68.92	Chris Harmse; South Africa	67.67	Tshepang Makhethe; South Africa	65.54
Javelin throw	Phil-Mar van Rensburg; South Africa	76.04	John Ampomah; Ghana	75.22	Alex Kiprotich; Kenya	74.08
Decathlon	Fredriech Pretorius; South Africa	7780	Atsu Nyamadi; Ghana	7501	Ali Kamé; Madagascar	6892

=== Women ===
Chronology: 2012 | 2014 | 2016 | 2018 | 2020

Event	Gold		Silver		Bronze	
100 metres (wind: +2.0 m/s)	Murielle Ahouré; Ivory Coast	10.99 CR	Carina Horn; South Africa	11.07	Marie-Josée Ta Lou; Ivory Coast	11.15
200 metres (wind: +1.2 m/s)	Marie-Josée Ta Lou; Ivory Coast	22.81	Alyssa Conley; South Africa	22.84	Gina Bass; Gambia	22.92 NR
400 metres	Kabange Mupopo; Zambia	51.56	Margaret Wambui; Kenya	52,24	Patience Okon George; Nigeria	52.33
800 metres	Caster Semenya; South Africa	1:58.20	Malika Akkaoui; Morocco	2:00.24	Emily Cherotich; Kenya	2:00.70
1500 metres	Caster Semenya; South Africa	4:01.99 CR	Rabab Arafi; Morocco	4:03.95	Adanech Anbesa; Ethiopia	4:05.22
5000 metres	Sheila Chepkirui; Kenya	15:05.45 CR	Margaret Chelimo; Kenya	15:07.56	Dera Dida; Ethiopia	15:15.26
10,000 metres	Alice Aprot; Kenya	30:26.94 CR	Jackline Chepngeno; Kenya	31:27.7	Joyline Jepkosgei; Kenya	31:28.3
100 metres hurdles (wind: +1.6 m/s)	Claudia Heunis; South Africa	13.35	Marthe Koala; Burkina Faso	13.36	Maryke Brits; South Africa	13.47
400 metres hurdles	Wenda Nel; South Africa	54.86	Maureen Jelegat; Kenya	56.12	Tameka Jameson; Nigeria	57.17
3000 metres steeplechase	Norah Jeruto; Kenya	9:25.07 CR	Agnes Chesang; Kenya	9:27.22	Weyneshet Ansa; Ethiopia	9:39.89
4 × 100 metres relay	South Africa; Tebogo Mamathu; Alyssa Conley; Tamzin Thomas; Carina Horn	43.66	Ghana; Flings Owusu-Agyapong; Gemima Acheampong; Beatrice Gyaman; Janet Amponsah	44.05	Ivory Coast; Adeline Gouenon; Marie-Josée Ta Lou; Nene Kanaté; Murielle Ahouré	44.29
4 × 400 metres relay	South Africa; Jeanelle Griesel; Wenda Nel; Justine Palframan; Caster Semenya	3:28.49 CR NR	Nigeria; Omolara Omotosho; Regina George; Yinka Ajayi; Patience Okon George	3:29.94	Kenya; Jacinta Shikanda; Maureen Jelagat; Maureen Thomas; Margaret Wambui	3:30.21
20 kilometres walk	Grace Wanjiru; Kenya	1:30:43 CR, AR	Yehualeye Beleew; Ethiopia	1:31:58 NR	Chahinez Nasri; Tunisia	1:34:45
High jump	Lissa Labiche; Seychelles	1.85 m	Doreen Amata; Nigeria	1.82 m	Basant Hassan; Egypt	1.79 m
Pole vault	Syrine Balti; Tunisia	4.00 m	Dora Mahfoudi; Tunisia	3.80 m	Nisrine Dinar; Morocco	3.60 m
Long jump	Ese Brume; Nigeria	6.57 m (w) (+ 2.8 m/s)	Joëlle Mbumi Nkouindjin; Cameroon	6.39 m (w) (+ 2.6 m/s)	Sarah Ngongoa; Cameroon	6.34 m (w) (+ 2.7 m/s)
Triple jump	Nadia Eke; Ghana	13.42 m w	Joëlle Mbumi Nkouindjin; Cameroon	13.37 m (+0.8 m/s)	Patience Ntshingila; South Africa	13.24 m (+0.8 m/s)
Shot put	Auriol Dongmo; Cameroon	17.64 m	Nwanneka Okwelogu; Nigeria	17.07 m	Chioma Onyekwere; Nigeria	15.71 m
Discus throw	Nwanneka Okwelogu; Nigeria	56.75 m	Chinwe Okoro; Nigeria	55.67 m	Chioma Onyekwere; Nigeria	53.91 m
Hammer throw	Amy Sène; Senegal	68.35 m CR	Lætitia Bambara; Burkina Faso	68.12 m	Sarah Bensaad; Tunisia	62.53 m
Javelin throw	Sunette Viljoen; South Africa	64.08 m	Jo-ane Van Dyk; South Africa	56.22 m	Pascaline Adanhoegbe; Benin	54.88 m NR
Heptathlon	Uhunoma Osazuwa; Nigeria	6153 pts CR	Marthe Koala; Burkina Faso	5952 pts	Elizabeth Dadzie; Ghana	5730 pts

== Medal table ==
* Host nation (Host nation)

Rank	Nation	Gold	Silver	Bronze	Total
1	South Africa (RSA)*	16	9	8	33
2	Kenya (KEN)	8	8	8	24
3	Nigeria (NGR)	4	5	7	16
4	Ivory Coast (CIV)	3	1	2	6
5	Botswana (BOT)	3	1	1	5
6	Ghana (GHA)	1	3	2	6
6	Tunisia (TUN)	1	3	2	6
8	Ethiopia (ETH)	1	2	3	6
9	Cameroon (CMR)	1	2	2	5
9	Morocco (MAR)	1	2	2	5
11	Senegal (SEN)	1	1	0	2
12	Egypt (EGY)	1	0	1	2
12	Zambia (ZAM)	1	0	1	2
14	Algeria (ALG)	1	0	0	1
14	Seychelles (SEY)	1	0	0	1
16	Burkina Faso (BUR)	0	4	0	4
17	Gambia (GAM)	0	1	1	2
17	Lesotho (LES)	0	1	1	2
19	Congo (CGO)	0	1	0	1
20	Benin (BEN)	0	0	1	1
20	Liberia (LBR)	0	0	1	1
20	Madagascar (MAD)	0	0	1	1
Totals (22 entries)		44	44	44	132

== See also ==
- 2016 European Athletics Championships
