= Athletics at the 2009 Jeux de la Francophonie – Results =

These are the official results of the athletics competition at the 2009 Jeux de la Francophonie which took place on 1–6 October 2009 in Beirut, Lebanon.

== Men's results ==
=== 100 meters ===
Heats – October 1
Wind:
Heat 1: +2.3 m/s, Heat 2: +3.5 m/s, Heat 3: +0.3 m/s, Heat 4: +0.9 m/s, Heat 5: +0.3 m/s

Rank	Heat	Name	Nationality	Time	Notes
1	1	Ben Youssef Meité	Ivory Coast	10.30	Q
2	4	Stéphan Buckland	Mauritius	10.33	Q
3	1	Idrissa Adam	Cameroon	10.35	Q
4	2	Hank Palmer	Canada	10.36	Q
5	4	Mouhamadou Lamine Niang	Senegal	10.38	Q
6	2	Emmanuel Ngom Priso	France	10.43	Q
6	4	Wilfried Koffi Hua	Ivory Coast	10.43	Q
8	2	Fabrice Coiffic	Mauritius	10.44	Q
9	3	Aziz Ouhadi	Morocco	10.45	Q
10	1	Delivert Arsene Kimbembe	Republic of the Congo	10.48	Q
11	4	Gérard Kobéané	Burkina Faso	10.49	Q
12	5	Amr Ibrahim Mostafa Seoud	Egypt	10.51	Q
13	5	Nicolas Macrozonaris	Quebec	10.54	Q
14	1	Innocent Bologo	Burkina Faso	10.56	Q
15	2	Jean-Marie Louis	Wallonia	10.57	Q
15	1	Holder da Silva	Guinea-Bissau	10.57	q
17	2	Rikam Mwala	Cameroon	10.60	q
18	2	Alassane Diallo	Senegal	10.62	q
19	3	Éric Pacôme N'Dri	Ivory Coast	10.65	Q
19	5	Oudéré Kankarafou	France	10.65	Q
21	3	Idrissa Sanou	Burkina Faso	10.66	Q
22	2	Mohamad Siraj Tamim	Lebanon	10.72	q
23	3	Abdourahim Haroun	Chad	10.73	Q
24	4	David Pednault	Quebec	10.74	
25	5	Modibo Diarra	Mali	10.75	Q
26	1	Ahmed Bongo	Mauritius	10.77	
27	5	Nourou-Dine Boni	Benin	10.93	
28	4	Moumi Sebergue	Chad	10.97	
29	3	Malang Amati Sane	Senegal	11.04	
30	3	Ulrich Allazoum	Central African Republic	11.13	
31	5	Hugues Tshiyinga	Democratic Republic of the Congo	11.18	
32	1	Bonifacio Esono Abaga	Equatorial Guinea	11.43	
	2	Jone Fernando Co	Guinea-Bissau	DQ	FS

Semi-finals – October 1
Wind:
Heat 1: +2.1 m/s, Heat 2: +2.4 m/s, Heat 3: +2.5 m/s

Rank	Heat	Name	Nationality	Time	Notes
1	2	Aziz Ouhadi	Morocco	10.23	Q
2	3	Ben Youssef Meité	Ivory Coast	10.30	Q
3	2	Hank Palmer	Canada	10.32	Q
4	3	Mouhamadou Lamine Niang	Senegal	10.32	Q
5	2	Nicolas Macrozonaris	Quebec	10.33	q
6	3	Idrissa Adam	Cameroon	10.35	q
7	1	Amr Ibrahim Mostafa Seoud	Egypt	10.44	Q
8	2	Gérard Kobéané	Burkina Faso	10.45	
9	3	Fabrice Coiffic	Mauritius	10.47	
10	3	Delivert Arsene Kimbembe	Republic of the Congo	10.47	
11	1	Emmanuel Ngom Priso	France	10.50	Q
12	1	Wilfried Koffi Hua	Ivory Coast	10.52	
13	1	Stéphan Buckland	Mauritius	10.55	
14	2	Holder da Silva	Guinea-Bissau	10.55	
15	3	Innocent Bologo	Burkina Faso	10.59	
16	3	Mohamad Siraj Tamim	Lebanon	10.61	
17	2	Éric Pacôme N'Dri	Ivory Coast	10.63	
18	3	Abdourahim Haroun	Chad	10.64	
19	2	Oudéré Kankarafou	France	10.65	
20	2	Rikam Mwala	Cameroon	10.66	
21	1	Idrissa Sanou	Burkina Faso	10.71	
22	1	Modibo Diarra	Mali	10.71	
23	1	Alassane Diallo	Senegal	10.73	
24	1	Jean-Marie Louis	Wallonia	10.85	

Final – October 2
Wind: +4.6 m/s

Rank	Lane	Name	Nationality	Time	Notes
1st place, gold medalist(s)	5	Ben Youssef Meité	Ivory Coast	10.15	
2nd place, silver medalist(s)	4	Aziz Ouhadi	Morocco	10.31	
3rd place, bronze medalist(s)	8	Mouhamadou Lamine Niang	Senegal	10.32	
4	2	Idrissa Adam	Cameroon	10.32	
5	1	Nicolas Macrozonaris	Quebec	10.32	
6	6	Amr Ibrahim Mostafa Seoud	Egypt	10.42	
7	7	Emmanuel Ngom Priso	France	10.45	
8	3	Hank Palmer	Canada	10.49	

=== 200 meters ===
Heats – October 4
Wind:
Heat 1: -2.3 m/s, Heat 2: -2.5 m/s, Heat 3: -1.9 m/s, Heat 4: -3.3 m/s

Rank	Heat	Name	Nationality	Time	Notes
1	3	Stéphan Buckland	Mauritius	21.05	Q
2	3	Idrissa Adam	Cameroon	21.11	Q
3	2	Fabrice Coiffic	Mauritius	21.48	Q
4	2	Abdourahmane Ndour	Senegal	21.49	Q
5	2	Rohan Stewart	Canada	21.53	Q
5	3	Khalid Zougari	Morocco	21.53	Q
7	4	Samuel William	Ivory Coast	21.66	Q
8	3	Delivert Arsene Kimbembe	Republic of the Congo	21.67	q
9	2	Abdourahim Haroun	Chad	21.69	q
10	4	Ahmed Bongo	Mauritius	21.71	Q
11	3	Hua Wilfrieds Serg Koffi	Ivory Coast	21.72	q
11	4	Holder da Silva	Guinea-Bissau	21.72	Q
13	2	Siapade Marius Loua	Ivory Coast	21.91	q
14	4	Mohamad Siraj Tamim	Lebanon	21.95	
15	1	Ben Youssef Meité	Ivory Coast	22.17	Q
16	1	Serge Tcheuko Siewe	Cameroon	22.33	Q
17	1	Hugues Tshiyinga	Democratic Republic of the Congo	22.51	Q
18	4	Moumi Sebergue	Chad	22.54	
19	4	Jules Bonyafala	Democratic Republic of the Congo	22.68	
20	2	Jone Fernando Co	Guinea-Bissau	23.95	
21	3	Oumar Loum	Senegal	24.59	
	1	Ulrich Allazoum	Central African Republic	DNS	
	1	Jean-Marie Louis	Wallonia	DNS	
	1	Amr Ibrahim Mostafa Seoud	Egypt	DNS	
	3	Omer Kowal Ingasse	Central African Republic	DNS	
	4	Rikam Mwala	Cameroon	DNS	

Semi-finals – October 4
Wind:
Heat 1: -1.5 m/s, Heat 2: +0.6 m/s

Rank	Heat	Name	Nationality	Time	Notes
1	1	Stéphan Buckland	Mauritius	20.78	Q
2	1	Ben Youssef Meité	Ivory Coast	20.86	Q
3	2	Khalid Zougari	Morocco	21.13	Q
4	2	Fabrice Coiffic	Mauritius	21.22	Q
5	2	Abdourahmane Ndour	Senegal	21.28	Q
6	1	Delivert Arsene Kimbembe	Republic of the Congo	21.29	Q
7	2	Hua Wilfrieds Serg Koffi	Ivory Coast	21.46	q
8	1	Ahmed Bongo	Mauritius	21.51	q
9	2	Samuel William	Ivory Coast	21.52	
10	2	Abdourahim Haroun	Chad	21.59	
11	1	Siapade Marius Loua	Ivory Coast	22.00	
12	2	Serge Tcheuko Siewe	Cameroon	22.10	
13	1	Hugues Tshiyinga	Democratic Republic of the Congo	22.25	
14	2	Holder da Silva	Guinea-Bissau	22.26	
	1	Rohan Stewart	Canada	DNF	
	1	Idrissa Adam	Cameroon	DQ	FS

Final – October 5
Wind: -0.2 m/s

Rank	Lane	Name	Nationality	Time	Notes
1st place, gold medalist(s)	4	Ben Youssef Meité	Ivory Coast	20.37	
2nd place, silver medalist(s)	3	Stéphan Buckland	Mauritius	20.59	
3rd place, bronze medalist(s)	6	Khalid Zougari	Morocco	20.77	
4	5	Fabrice Coiffic	Mauritius	20.99	
5	7	Delivert Arsene Kimbembe	Republic of the Congo	21.10	
6	8	Abdourahmane Ndour	Senegal	21.12	
7	1	Hua Wilfrieds Serg Koffi	Ivory Coast	21.31	
8	2	Ahmed Bongo	Mauritius	21.70	

=== 400 meters ===
Heats – October 2

Rank	Heat	Name	Nationality	Time	Notes
1	1	Mathieu Gnanligo	Benin	46.58	Q
2	1	Marouane Maadadi	Morocco	47.08	Q
3	2	Eric Milazar	Mauritius	47.58	Q
4	1	Fernando Augustin	Mauritius	47.69	Q
5	2	Jounes Belkhaifa	Morocco	48.37	Q
6	2	Ian Monet	Mauritius	48.58	Q
7	2	Aram Davtyan	Armenia	48.76	q
8	1	Ramzi Naim	Lebanon	49.51	q
9	1	Sengwa Kibambe	Democratic Republic of the Congo	50.50	
10	2	Nouha Badji	Senegal	50.53	
11	1	Omer Kowal Ingasse	Central African Republic	51.57	
12	1	Florent Battistel	Monaco	52.27	
	2	Seyni Maikido Rachidatou	Niger	DNS	

Final – October 3

Rank	Lane	Name	Nationality	Time	Notes
1st place, gold medalist(s)	5	Eric Milazar	Mauritius	46.00	
2nd place, silver medalist(s)	3	Mathieu Gnanligo	Benin	46.03	
3rd place, bronze medalist(s)	6	Marouane Maadadi	Morocco	46.54	
4	4	Jounes Belkhaifa	Morocco	46.77	
5	7	Fernando Augustin	Mauritius	46.81	
6	1	Aram Davtyan	Armenia	47.95	
7	8	Ian Monet	Mauritius	48.09	
8	2	Ramzi Naim	Lebanon	49.88	

=== 800 meters ===
Heats – October 4

Rank	Heat	Name	Nationality	Time	Notes
1	1	Amine Laâlou	Morocco	1:51.15	Q
2	2	Abdoulaye Wagne	Senegal	1:51.33	Q
3	2	Fouad Elkaam	Morocco	1:51.43	Q
4	1	Mouhcine El Amine	Morocco	1:51.45	Q
5	1	Florent Lacasse	France	1:51.50	Q
6	2	Kévin Hautcœur	France	1:51.69	Q
7	1	Mamadou Gueye	Senegal	1:51.72	q
8	1	Severin Sahinkuye	Burundi	1:51.83	q
9	2	Geoffrey Harris	Canada	1:51.97	
10	2	Oscar Bouba	Cameroon	1:52.08	
11	1	Brian Roppelt	Canada	1:52.43	
12	2	Aram Davtyan	Armenia	1:53.17	
13	1	Jean-Marc Doiron	New Brunswick	1:54.38	
14	2	Adam Currie	Canada	1:54.40	
15	1	Salifou Oumarou	Niger	1:54.77	
16	1	Osmat Ghreyzi	Lebanon	1:55.08	
17	2	Vicente Ntutumu	Equatorial Guinea	1:58.62	

Final – October 5

Rank	Name	Nationality	Time	Notes
1st place, gold medalist(s)	Amine Laâlou	Morocco	1:46.68	
2nd place, silver medalist(s)	Abdoulaye Wagne	Senegal	1:47.48	
3rd place, bronze medalist(s)	Mouhcine El Amine	Morocco	1:47.76	
4	Fouad Elkaam	Morocco	1:48.43	
5	Kévin Hautcœur	France	1:48.94	
6	Florent Lacasse	France	1:49.07	
7	Mamadou Gueye	Senegal	1:49.25	
8	Severin Sahinkuye	Burundi	1:50.09	

=== 1500 meters ===
October 2

Rank	Name	Nationality	Time	Notes
1st place, gold medalist(s)	Amine Laâlou	Morocco	3:51.59	
2nd place, silver medalist(s)	Fouad Elkaam	Morocco	3:51.85	
3rd place, bronze medalist(s)	Matthew Lincoln	Canada	3:53.61	
4	Timothy Konoval	Canada	3:53.71	
5	Abdelslam Kenouche	France	3:55.50	
6	Audace Baguma	Burundi	3:56.04	
7	Mounir Yemmouni	France	3:56.41	
8	Christian Thielen	Luxembourg	3:56.68	
9	Noureddine Smaïl	France	3:56.71	
10	Hassan Ayanleh	Djibouti	3:57.40	
11	Adam Kellar	New Brunswick	3:58.49	
12	Osmat Ghreyzi	Lebanon	4:04.25	
13	Junior Komna	Central African Republic	4:24.90	

=== 5000 meters ===
October 4

Rank	Name	Nationality	Time	Notes
1st place, gold medalist(s)	Chakir Boujattaoui	Morocco	13:42.72	
2nd place, silver medalist(s)	Anis Selmouni	Morocco	13:43.73	
3rd place, bronze medalist(s)	Hicham Bellani	Morocco	13:45.53	
4	Stéphane Lefrand	France	13:53.33	
5	Godfrey Rutayisire	Rwanda	14:00.23	
6	Audace Baguma	Burundi	14:00.92	
7	Yoahan Durand	France	14:12.78	
8	Simon Pierre Niyukuri	Burundi	14:29.37	
9	Moktar Benhari	France	14:41.80	
10	Hussein Awada	Lebanon	14:58.68	
11	Hem Bunting	Cambodia	15:39.28	
	Bernard Bizimana	Burundi	DNS	
	Dieudonné Disi	Rwanda	DNS	

=== 10,000 meters ===
October 1

Rank	Name	Nationality	Time	Notes
1st place, gold medalist(s)	Dieudonné Disi	Rwanda	29:38.68	
2nd place, silver medalist(s)	Anis Selmouni	Morocco	29:39.07	
3rd place, bronze medalist(s)	Hicham Bellani	Morocco	29:43.39	
4	Godfrey Rutayisire	Rwanda	29:46.19	
5	Denis Mayaud	France	29:48.51	
6	Bernard Bizimana	Burundi	29:53.99	
7	Etienne Bizimana	Burundi	30:02.87	
	Hussein Awada	Lebanon	DNS	

=== Marathon ===
October 4

Rank	Name	Nationality	Time	Notes
1st place, gold medalist(s)	Zaid Laroussi	Morocco	2:24:08	
2nd place, silver medalist(s)	Felix Ntirenganya	Rwanda	2:24:23	
3rd place, bronze medalist(s)	Ahmed Nasif	Morocco	2:24:44	
4	Omar Issa	Lebanon	2:35:29	
5	Ngoy Alain Nkulu	Democratic Republic of the Congo	2:38:06	
6	Emmanuel David	France	2:44:27	
	Sevak Yeghikyan	Armenia	DNF	
	Mande Ilunga	Democratic Republic of the Congo	DNF	

=== 110 meters hurdles ===
October 5
Wind: -0.1 m/s

Rank	Lane	Name	Nationality	Time	Notes
1st place, gold medalist(s)	4	Jared MacLeod	Canada	13.56	GR
2nd place, silver medalist(s)	3	Alexandru Mihailescu	Romania	13.92	
3rd place, bronze medalist(s)	6	Aymen Ben Ahmed	Tunisia	14.07	
4	2	Claude Godart	Luxembourg	14.21	
5	8	Quentin Ruffacq	Wallonia	14.26	
6	7	Ahmad Hazer	Lebanon	14.38	
7	5	Thomas Martinot-Lagarde	France	14.61	

=== 400 meters hurdles ===
Heats – October 1

Rank	Heat	Name	Nationality	Time	Notes
1	2	Gabriel El Hanbli	Canada	51.32	Q
2	2	Mamadou Kasse Hann	Senegal	51.43	Q
3	2	Fadel Bellaabouss	France	51.48	Q
4	2	Mohamed Sghaier	Tunisia	51.51	q
5	2	Barnabe Bationo	Burkina Faso	51.60	q
6	1	Sébastien Maillard	France	51.83	Q
7	1	Nigel Joseph	Canada	52.15	Q
8	1	Ibrahim Maïga	Mali	52.32	Q
9	1	Jean Antonio Vieillesse	Mauritius	52.43	
10	1	Assane Thiam	Senegal	53.00	
11	2	Houssein Nour Ali	Djibouti	56.46	
	1	Hugo Grillas	France	DNF	
	2	Vu Van Tinh	Vietnam	DNF	
	1	Ahmad Hazer	Lebanon	DQ	FS

Final – October 2

Rank	Lane	Name	Nationality	Time	Notes
1st place, gold medalist(s)	7	Fadel Bellaabouss	France	50.23	
2nd place, silver medalist(s)	6	Sébastien Maillard	France	50.35	
3rd place, bronze medalist(s)	3	Mamadou Kasse Hann	Senegal	50.69	
4	1	Barnabe Bationo	Burkina Faso	50.91	
5	4	Gabriel El Hanbli	Canada	51.02	
6	8	Ibrahim Maïga	Mali	51.17	
7	5	Nigel Joseph	Canada	51.87	
8	2	Mohamed Sghaier	Tunisia	54.67	

=== 3000 meters steeplechase ===
October 3

Rank	Name	Nationality	Time	Notes
1st place, gold medalist(s)	Abdelatif Chemlal	Morocco	8:40.18	
2nd place, silver medalist(s)	Chakir Boujattaoui	Morocco	8:41.06	
3rd place, bronze medalist(s)	Amor Yahya	Tunisia	8:48.30	
4	Timothee Bommier	France	8:55.43	
5	Joshua Karanja	Canada	8:59.90	
6	Joël Bourgeois	New Brunswick	9:01.47	
7	Alex Genest	Canada	9:12.08	
8	Mohammed Ajami	Lebanon	9:51.55	

=== 4 × 100 meters relay ===
Heats – October 3

Rank	Heat	Nation	Competitors	Time	Notes
1st place, gold medalist(s)	2	Cameroon	Serge Tcheuko Siewe, Idrissa Adam, François Belinga, Joseph Batangdon	40.23	Q
2nd place, silver medalist(s)	2	Mauritius	Fabrice Coiffic, Eric Milazar, Henrico Louis, Stéphan Buckland	40.25	Q
3rd place, bronze medalist(s)	1	Senegal	Alassane Diallo, Mouhamadou Lamine Niang, Oumar Loum, Abdourahmane Ndour	40.35	Q
4	1	Burkina Faso	Siaka Son, Idrissa Sanou, Innocent Bologo, Gérard Kobéané	40.41	Q
5	1	Canada	Nigelo Joseph, Gabriel El Hanbli, Rohan Stewart, Hank Palmer	40.91	Q
6	2	Ivory Coast	Hua Wilfrieds Serg Koffi, Samuel William, Siapade Marius Loua, Ben Youssef Meité	41.22	Q
7	1	France	Emmanuel Biron, Emmanuel Ngom Priso, Oudéré Kankarafou, Sébastien Maillard	41.30	q
8	2	Lebanon	Mohammad Chouayb, Michel Zinati, Dany Nasser, Ramzi Naim	43.58	q
	2	Morocco	Smail Daif, Aziz Ouhadi, Khalid Zougari, Yahya Berrabah	DNF	

Final – October 3

Rank	Lane	Nation	Competitors	Time	Notes
1st place, gold medalist(s)	3	Burkina Faso	Siaka Son, Idrissa Sanou, Innocent Bologo, Gérard Kobéané	39.57	NR
2nd place, silver medalist(s)	4	Mauritius	Fabrice Coiffic, Eric Milazar, Henrico Louis, Stéphan Buckland	39.60	
3rd place, bronze medalist(s)	5	Senegal	Alassane Diallo, Mouhamadou Lamine Niang, Oumar Loum, Abdourahmane Ndour	39.87	
4	7	Ivory Coast	Hua Wilfrieds Serg Koffi, Samuel William, Siapade Marius Loua, Ben Youssef Meité	39.91	
5	6	Cameroon	Serge Tcheuko Siewe, Idrissa Adam, François Belinga, Joseph Batangdon	40.07	
6	8	Canada	Nigelo Joseph, Gabriel El Hanbli, Rohan Stewart, Hank Palmer	40.67	
7	2	France	Emmanuel Biron, Emmanuel Ngom Priso, Oudéré Kankarafou, Sébastien Maillard	40.73	
8	1	Lebanon	Mohammad Chouayb, Michel Zinati, Dany Nasser, Ramzi Naim	43.12	

=== 4 × 400 meters relay ===
October 5

Rank	Nation	Competitors	Time	Notes
1st place, gold medalist(s)	Senegal	Mamadou Kasse Hann, Abdoulaye Wagne, Assane Thiam, Mamadou Gueye	3:06.93	
2nd place, silver medalist(s)	Morocco	Smail Daif, Abdekerim Khoudri, Jounes Belkhaifa, Amine Laâlou	3:07.46	
3rd place, bronze medalist(s)	Mauritius	Jean Antonio Vieillesse, Fernando Augustin, Jean Ian Monet, Eric Milazar	3:08.29	
4	France	Sébastien Maillard, Florent Lacasse, Kévin Hautcœur, Fadel Bellaabouss	3:11.43	
5	Canada	Geoffrey Harris, Gabriel El Hanbli, Nigel Joseph, Rohan Stewart	3:11.65	
6	Cameroon	François Belinga, Oscar Bouba, Serge Tcheuko Siewe, Idrissa Adam	3:14.49	
7	Lebanon	Ahmad Hazer, Thomas Semaan, Khaled Mansour, Ramzi Naim	3:15.73	

=== 20 kilometers walk ===
October 3

Rank	Name	Nationality	Time	Notes
1st place, gold medalist(s)	Hervé Davaux	France	1:25:35	
2nd place, silver medalist(s)	Hassanin Sebai	Tunisia	1:28:30	
3rd place, bronze medalist(s)	Bertrand Moulinet	France	1:31:02	
4	Jocelyn Ruest	New Brunswick	1:47:46	
5	Kalamba Beya	Democratic Republic of the Congo	1:48:49	
	Inaki Gomez	Canada	DNF	

=== High jump ===
October 5

Rank	Name	Nationality	2.00	2.05	2.10	2.15	2.20	2.24	Result	Notes
1st place, gold medalist(s)	Mihai Donisan	Romania	–	o	o	o	o	o	2.24	
2nd place, silver medalist(s)	Mathias Cianci	France	–	o	o	o	o	xxx	2.20	
3rd place, bronze medalist(s)	Mark Dillon	Canada	–	–	o	o	xo	xxx	2.20	
3rd place, bronze medalist(s)	Fabrice Saint-Jean	France	–	–	o	o	xo	xxx	2.20	
5	Karim Samir Lofty	Egypt	–	o	o	xo	xxo	xxx	2.20	
6	Jean-Claude Rabbath	Lebanon	o	o	o	xo	xxx		2.15	
6	Derek Watkins	Canada	–	–	o	xo	xxx		2.15	
8	William Woodcock	Seychelles	o	o	xxo	xo	xxx		2.15	

=== Pole vault ===
October 4

Rank	Name	Nationality	4.90	5.00	5.10	5.20	5.25	5.40	5.55	Result	Notes
1st place, gold medalist(s)	Vincent Favretto	France	–	xo	–	xxo	–	o	xxx	5.40	
2nd place, silver medalist(s)	Kristian Wilson	Canada	xo	o	o	–	xxx			5.10	
3rd place, bronze medalist(s)	David Foley	Canada	xo	xo	xxx					5.00	
4	Joshua Kirkpatrick	Canada	o	xxx						4.90	

=== Long jump ===
October 2

Rank	Name	Nationality	#1	#2	#3	#4	#5	#6	Result	Notes
1st place, gold medalist(s)	Yahya Berrabah	Morocco	x	x	7.71	8.40	x	x	8.40	GR
2nd place, silver medalist(s)	Ndiss Kaba Badji	Senegal	8.28	x	8.32	8.12	8.21	8.26	8.32	
3rd place, bronze medalist(s)	Julien Fivaz	Switzerland	x	7.58	x	7.76	x	5.99	7.76	
4	Christopher Greenaway	Canada	6.94	7.63w	7.48	7.40	7.58	7.72	7.72	
5	Abdelhakim Mlaab	Morocco	7.09	7.28	7.29w	5.53w	7.38	x	7.38	
6	Emmanuel Biron	France	7.33w	x	x	x	x	x	7.33w	
7	Marc Habib	Lebanon	x	7.22	6.93	x	6.91	7.16	7.22	
8	Jonathan Chimier	Mauritius	x	6.99	x	6.94	7.09	x	7.09	
9	Nicolas Stempnick	Wallonia	4.03w	x	4.48				4.48	
	Bonifacio Esono Abaga	Equatorial Guinea							DNS	

=== Triple jump ===
October 4

Rank	Name	Nationality	#1	#2	#3	#4	#5	#6	Result	Notes
1st place, gold medalist(s)	Hugo Mamba-Schlick	Cameroon	16.40	16.78	x	–	x	16.52	16.78	
2nd place, silver medalist(s)	Alin Anghel	Romania	16.07	15.80	x	x	16.24	x	16.24	
3rd place, bronze medalist(s)	Julien Kapek	France	15.98	x	16.23	16.15	–	14.62	16.23	
4	Thierry Adanabou	Burkina Faso	16.05	x	15.36	15.30	x	x	16.05	
5	Oussama Naddaf	Lebanon	14.38	14.27	x	14.05	x	14.05	14.38	
	Ndiss Kaba Badji	Senegal							DNS	

=== Shot put ===
October 5

Rank	Name	Nationality	#1	#2	#3	#4	#5	#6	Result	Notes
1st place, gold medalist(s)	Tumatai Dauphin	France	17.16	17.38	16.93	x	18.32	18.63	18.63	
2nd place, silver medalist(s)	Yasser Ibrahim Farag	Egypt	17.59	17.97	18.09	x	x	x	18.09	
3rd place, bronze medalist(s)	Laurentiu Popa	Romania	17.17	17.03	x	x	x	x	17.17	
4	Badri Obeid	Lebanon	16.56	16.55	16.15	16.87	16.94	16.83	16.94	
5	Matthew Doherty	Canada	15.39	15.69	15.35	x	15.54	15.29	15.69	
6	Andrew Ysebaert	Canada	x	15.60	x	14.73	15.24	15.51	15.60	
7	Franck Elemba Owaka	Republic of the Congo	14.14	13.69	13.27	13.84	15.09	14.97	15.09	
8	Owen Williems	Canada	14.65	14.75	x	14.47	14.38	14.53	14.75	

=== Discus throw ===
October 1

Rank	Name	Nationality	#1	#2	#3	#4	#5	#6	Result	Notes
1st place, gold medalist(s)	Omar Ahmed El Ghazaly	Egypt	60.89	x	60.57	59.93	60.33	61.01	61.01	
2nd place, silver medalist(s)	Yasser Ibrahim Farag	Egypt	57.47	58.71	59.09	59.56	57.04	x	59.56	
3rd place, bronze medalist(s)	Jean-François Aurokiom	France	55.58	x	58.10	59.46	58.30	56.16	59.46	
4	Nabil Kiram	Morocco	53.90	53.54	47.88	52.38	55.80	54.18	55.80	
5	Greg Pilling	Canada	x	54.96	x	52.74	54.94	x	54.96	
6	Owen Williems	Canada	50.96	x	x	50.48	50.13	49.73	50.96	
7	Michael Ransky	Canada	x	x	x	50.96	49.89	x	50.96	
8	Georges Hachem	Lebanon	x	43.66	41.91	x	42.53	44.96	44.96	
9	Franck Elemba Owaka	Republic of the Congo	x	39.44	40.95				40.95	

=== Hammer throw ===
October 2

Rank	Name	Nationality	#1	#2	#3	#4	#5	#6	Result	Notes
1st place, gold medalist(s)	Mohsen Mohamed Anani	Egypt	x	70.12	x	x	69.95	71.30	71.30	
2nd place, silver medalist(s)	Frédéric Pouzy	France	x	x	68.24	66.05	67.63	x	68.24	
3rd place, bronze medalist(s)	Jerome Bortoluzzi	France	x	68.03	x	x	x	x	68.03	
4	Cosmin Sorescu	Romania	x	x	62.68	65.30	x	66.97	66.97	
5	Hassan Mohamed Mahmoud	Egypt	62.40	63.33	62.70	63.46	64.65	65.95	65.95	
6	Driss Barid	Morocco	63.04	62.30	x	63.27	62.87	x	63.27	
7	Matthew Doherty	Canada	x	59.72	x	x	61.88	61.43	61.88	
8	Sean Steacy	Canada	x	57.79	x	x	54.81	57.71	57.79	
9	Alexander Bespalov	Quebec	55.83	x	x				55.83	
10	Nicolas Li Yun Fong	Mauritius	51.36	53.85	x				53.85	
11	Mohammad El Khatib	Lebanon	39.17	39.30	38.13				39.30	
	Nolan Henderson	Canada	x	x	x				NM	
	Mostafa Al-Gamel	Egypt							DNS	

=== Javelin throw ===
October 5

Rank	Name	Nationality	#1	#2	#3	#4	#5	#6	Result	Notes
1st place, gold medalist(s)	Ihab Abdelrahman El Sayed	Egypt	77.33	76.58	72.42	75.15	72.58	77.25	77.33	GR
2nd place, silver medalist(s)	Curtis Moss	Canada	75.74	72.48	x	68.34	71.76	75.71	75.74	
3rd place, bronze medalist(s)	Levente Bartha	Romania	71.28	74.65	74.58	x	72.90	74.13	74.65	
4	Vitolio Tipotio	France	72.30	74.19	x	69.48	68.94	67.39	74.19	
5	Sadek Anani	Egypt	65.32	71.08	67.69	x	x	68.66	71.08	
6	Kyle Nielsen	Canada	x	70.81	69.84	66.08	71.01	71.01		
7	Caleb Jones	New Brunswick	65.98	x	63.32	63.89	64.61	57.68	65.98	
8	Taleb El Hassan	Lebanon	60.86	57.87	x	57.29	56.01	57.21	60.86	

=== Decathlon ===
October 1–2

The highest mark recorded in each event is highlighted in yellow

Rank	Athlete	Nationality	100m	LJ	SP	HJ	400m	110m H	DT	PV	JT	1500m	Points	Notes
1st place, gold medalist(s)	Massimo Bertocchi	Canada	10.84	7.45w	14.31	1.99	49.00	14.46	47.08	4.70	52.78	4:43.74	8053	
2nd place, silver medalist(s)	François Gourmet	Wallonia	10.78	7.19	13.91	1.87	49.78	15.51	41.81	4.60	51.72	4:27.41	7660	
3rd place, bronze medalist(s)	Jamie Adjetey-Nelson	Canada	10.90	7.23	14.27	2.02	50.91	15.12	44.52	4.30	55.28	5:01.87	7602	
4	Gaël Quérin	France	11.23	7.14w	11.83	1.93	48.97	14.92	38.26	4.60	47.67	4:21.75	7488	
5	Patrick Thierry	Mauritius	11.44	6.69w	12.06	1.87	52.04	15.75	41.04	4.40	61.97	4:59.94	7032	
6	Reid Gustavson	Canada	11.37	6.99	11.78	1.96	50.60	16.67	32.13	4.10	47.26	4:41.15	6770	
7	Ali Hazer	Lebanon	10.97	6.31	11.34	1.87	49.53	14.69	34.95	3.50	44.45	4:42.33	6716	

== Women's results ==
=== 100 meters ===
Heats – October 1
Wind:
Heat 1: +1.3 m/s, Heat 2: +0.4 m/s, Heat 3: +4.9 m/s

Rank	Heat	Name	Nationality	Time	Notes
1	1	Geneviève Thibault	Canada	11.67	Q
2	1	Andreea Ograzeanu	Romania	11.67	Q
3	3	Kadiatou Camara	Mali	11.77	Q
4	3	Teneshia Peart	Canada	11.79	Q
5	2	Chantal Grant	Canada	11.89	Q
6	1	Marie-Jane Vincent	Mauritius	11.98	q
7	2	Stephanie Belibi	Cameroon	12.01	Q
8	3	Hinikissia Ndikert	Chad	12.03	q
9	1	Jamaa Chnaik	Morocco	12.04	
10	1	Esther Ndoumbe	Cameroon	12.11	
11	2	Ayodelé Ikuesan	France	12.14	
12	1	Charlenne Adjele	Benin	12.20	
13	2	Lorène Bazolo	Republic of the Congo	12.29	
14	2	Chantal Hayen	Luxembourg	12.60	
15	2	Maha El Mouallem	Lebanon	12.85	
16	3	Allisson Howatt	New Brunswick	13.00	
17	3	Fathia Ali Bouralew	Djibouti	14.16	
	1	Barira Ibrahim	Niger	DQ	FS
	2	Adja Arette Ndiaye	Senegal	DNS	

Final – October 2
Wind:
+2.2 m/s

Rank	Lane	Name	Nationality	Time	Notes
1st place, gold medalist(s)	5	Geneviève Thibault	Canada	11.55	
2nd place, silver medalist(s)	4	Kadiatou Camara	Mali	11.73	
3rd place, bronze medalist(s)	3	Chantal Grant	Canada	11.74	
4	6	Andreea Ograzeanu	Romania	11.74	
5	7	Teneshia Peart	Canada	11.94	
6	1	Marie-Jane Vincent	Mauritius	11.98	
7	8	Stephanie Belibi	Cameroon	12.04	
8	2	Hinikissia Ndikert	Chad	12.35	

=== 200 meters ===
Heats – October 4
Wind:
Heat 1: +1.3 m/s, Heat 2: +2.1 m/s

Rank	Heat	Name	Nationality	Time	Notes
1	1	Kimberly Hyacinthe	Canada	23.26	Q
2	1	Kaltouma Nadjina	Chad	23.55	Q
3	2	Esther Akinsulie	Canada	23.81	Q
4	2	Kadiatou Camara	Mali	23.91	Q
5	2	Amandine Ellard	France	24.11	Q
6	2	Andreea Ograzeanu	Romania	24.21	q
7	1	Lina Jacques-Sébastien	France	24.61	Q
8	1	Esther Ndoumbe	Cameroon	24.73	q
9	2	Lorène Bazolo	Republic of the Congo	24.74	
10	2	Hinikissia Ndikert	Chad	25.09	
11	1	Souliath Saka	Benin	25.24	
12	1	Thielien Dong	Vietnam	25.73	
13	1	Aziza Sbeyti	Lebanon	25.97	
14	1	Allisson Howatt	New Brunswick	26.40	
15	2	Gertrudis Luna	Equatorial Guinea	27.39	
	2	Stephanie Belibi	Cameroon	DQ	FS

Final – October 5
Wind:
-0.8 m/s

Rank	Lane	Name	Nationality	Time	Notes
1st place, gold medalist(s)	6	Kaltouma Nadjina	Chad	23.09	
2nd place, silver medalist(s)	4	Kimberly Hyacinthe	Canada	23.15	
3rd place, bronze medalist(s)	3	Esther Akinsulie	Canada	23.63	
4	3	Kadiatou Camara	Mali	23.88	
5	7	Amandine Ellard	France	23.99	
6	8	Lina Jacques-Sébastien	France	24.80	
7	1	Esther Ndoumbe	Cameroon	25.02	
	2	Andreea Ograzeanu	Romania	DNS	

=== 400 meters ===
Heats – October 2

Rank	Heat	Name	Nationality	Time	Notes
1	2	Kaltouma Nadjina	Chad	53.27	Q
2	1	Esther Akinsulie	Canada	54.72	Q
3	1	Fatou Bintou Fall	Senegal	54.75	Q
4	2	Ndeye Fatou Soumah	Senegal	54.92	Q
5	1	Vicki Tolton	Canada	55.26	Q
6	2	Kate Ruediger	Canada	55.29	Q
7	1	Sylvie Zimbere	Cameroon	55.44	q
8	2	Fatou Diabaye	Senegal	55.87	q
9	2	Naima Ibrahimi	Morocco	56.65	
10	1	Claudine Yemalin	Benin	58.02	
11	1	Rachida Seyni Maikido	Niger	1:00.95	
	2	Symphora Béhi	France	DNS	
	2	Laury Tachejian	Lebanon	DNS	

Final – October 3

Rank	Lane	Name	Nationality	Time	Notes
1st place, gold medalist(s)	4	Kaltouma Nadjina	Chad	51.04	
2nd place, silver medalist(s)	3	Fatou Bintou Fall	Senegal	52.90	
3rd place, bronze medalist(s)	6	Ndeye Fatou Soumah	Senegal	53.21	
4	5	Esther Akinsulie	Canada	53.57	
5	2	Fatou Diabaye	Senegal	54.79	
6	7	Vicki Tolton	Canada	54.80	
7	8	Kate Ruediger	Canada	54.82	
8	1	Sylvie Zimbere	Cameroon	55.30	

=== 800 meters ===
Heats – October 1

Rank	Heat	Name	Nationality	Time	Notes
1	3	Seltana Aït Hammou	Morocco	2:04.60	Q
2	3	Linda Marguet	France	2:05.87	Q
3	1	Halima Hachlaf	Morocco	2:06.16	Q
4	1	Monica Augustin-Vogel	Switzerland	2:06.56	Q
5	2	Fanjanteino Félix	France	2:06.57	Q
6	2	Tudorita Popescu	Romania	2:06.85	Q
7	3	Karine Belleau-Béliveau	Quebec	2:06.86	q
8	2	Melissa Bishop	Canada	2:07.07	q
9	1	Annabelle Lascar	Mauritius	2:08.51	
10	1	Leanna Maclean	Canada	2:08.89	
11	3	Seynabou Paye	Senegal	2:10.24	
12	3	Jennifer Kemp	Canada	2:10.51	
13	1	Martine Nobili	Luxembourg	2:11.78	
14	1	Nadine Frost	New Brunswick	2:13.11	
15	2	Haoua Besme	Chad	2:17.78	
16	1	Manale Tayyar	Lebanon	2:20.75	
17	2	Huguette Mujinga	Democratic Republic of the Congo	2:21.89	
18	3	Jeanne D'Arc Uwamahoro	Rwanda	2:21.92	
19	2	Tatiana Guella	Central African Republic	2:27.81	
20	2	Mariam Idriss Djibril	Djibouti	2:50.83	

Final – October 3

Rank	Name	Nationality	Time	Notes
1st place, gold medalist(s)	Seltana Aït Hammou	Morocco	2:02.62	
2nd place, silver medalist(s)	Halima Hachlaf	Morocco	2:02.76	
3rd place, bronze medalist(s)	Linda Marguet	France	2:03.15	
4	Fanjanteino Félix	France	2:03.49	
5	Monica Augustin-Vogel	Switzerland	2:06.07	
6	Karine Belleau-Béliveau	Quebec	2:06.25	
7	Tudorita Popescu	Romania	2:06.54	
8	Melissa Bishop	Canada	2:06.77	

=== 1500 meters ===
October 5

Rank	Name	Nationality	Time	Notes
1st place, gold medalist(s)	Btissam Lakhouad	Morocco	4:21.39	
2nd place, silver medalist(s)	Siham Hilali	Morocco	4:21.56	
3rd place, bronze medalist(s)	Seltana Aït Hammou	Morocco	4:21.79	
4	Monica Augustin-Vogel	Switzerland	4:25.81	
5	Laurane Picoche	France	4:26.36	
6	Karine Belleau-Béliveau	Quebec	4:26.92	
7	Nadine Frost	New Brunswick	4:33.51	
8	Bentille Alassane	Benin	4:33.89	
9	Jeanne D'arc Uwamahoro	Rwanda	4:34.50	
10	Marie-Chantal Ininahazwe	Burundi	4:34.83	
11	Huguette Mujinga	Democratic Republic of the Congo	4:58.09	
	Sibylle Duerrenmatt	Switzerland	DNF	
	Mariam Idriss Djibril	Djibouti	DNS	
	Sarah Awali	Lebanon	DNS	

=== 5000 meters ===
October 5

Rank	Name	Nationality	Time	Notes
1st place, gold medalist(s)	Bouchra Chaabi	Morocco	16:23.05	
2nd place, silver medalist(s)	Hanane Ouhaddou	Morocco	16:27.51	
3rd place, bronze medalist(s)	Thérese Ngono Etoundi	Cameroon	16:31.08	
6	Christine Bardelle	France	16:41.26	
8	Helene Guet	France	16:49.36	
?	Maria Lahrissi	Morocco	?	
?	Claudette Mukasakindi	Rwanda	?	
?	Jacqueline Murekatete	Rwanda	?	
?	Maria Pia Nehme	Lebanon	?	
?	Pauline Niyongere	Burundi	?	

=== 10,000 meters ===
October 2

Rank	Name	Nationality	Time	Notes
1st place, gold medalist(s)	Claudette Mukasakindi	Rwanda	35:32.60	
2nd place, silver medalist(s)	Bouchra Chaabi	Morocco	35:32.87	
3rd place, bronze medalist(s)	Maria Lahrissi	Morocco	37:53.14	
	Maria Pia Nehme	Lebanon	DNF	
	Epiphanie Nyirabarame	Rwanda	DNS	

=== Marathon ===
October 4

Rank	Name	Nationality	Time	Notes
1st place, gold medalist(s)	Epiphanie Nyirabarame	Rwanda	2:44:36	
2nd place, silver medalist(s)	Adeline Roche	France	3:03:18	
	Marie El Amm	Lebanon	DNS	

=== 100 meters hurdles ===
Heats – October 1
Wind:
Heat 1: +1.3 m/s, Heat 2: +1.2 m/s

Rank	Heat	Name	Nationality	Time	Notes
1	2	Anne Zagré	Wallonia	13.42	Q
2	2	Gnima Faye	Senegal	13.48	Q
3	1	Elisabeth Davin	Wallonia	13.50	Q
4	2	Solene Hamelin	France	13.51	Q
5	2	Carole Kaboud Mebam	Cameroon	13.57	q
6	1	Aurore Ruet	France	13.70	Q
7	1	Marie-Eve Dugas	Canada	13.92	Q
8	1	Adja Arette Ndiaye	Senegal	14.04	q
9	1	Alima Soura	Burkina Faso	14.08	
10	2	Jillian Drouin	Canada	14.15	
11	1	Gaëlle Fumeaux	Switzerland	14.30	
12	1	Laurence Beaudet	Quebec	14.32	
13	1	Yamina Hjaji	Morocco	14.73	
	2	Ariane Beaumont-Courteau	Quebec	DNF	
	2	Diala El Chab	Lebanon	DNF	

Final – October 2
Wind:
+1.0 m/s

Rank	Lane	Name	Nationality	Time	Notes
1st place, gold medalist(s)	5	Elisabeth Davin	Wallonia	13.32	
2nd place, silver medalist(s)	3	Gnima Faye	Senegal	13.35	
3rd place, bronze medalist(s)	6	Anne Zagré	Wallonia	13.37	
4	4	Aurore Ruet	France	13.53	
5	1	Carole Kaboud Mebam	Cameroon	13.55	
6	8	Solene Hamelin	France	13.62	
7	2	Adja Arette Ndiaye	Senegal	13.89	
8	7	Marie-Eve Dugas	Canada	13.89	

=== 400 meters hurdles ===
October 4

Rank	Lane	Name	Nationality	Time	Notes
1st place, gold medalist(s)	1	Hayat Lambarki	Morocco	58.40	
2nd place, silver medalist(s)	3	Lamiae Lhabze	Morocco	58.81	
3rd place, bronze medalist(s)	7	Carole Kaboud Mebam	Cameroon	58.85	
4	6	Mame Fatou Faye	Senegal	58.85	
5	4	Laetitia Denis	France	58.99	
6	2	Kim Reuland	Luxembourg	1:00.87	
7	8	Aïssata Soulama	Burkina Faso	1:00.93	
8	5	Miel Aydeou	Benin	1:01.77	

=== 3000 meters steeplechase ===
October 4

Rank	Name	Nationality	Time	Notes
1st place, gold medalist(s)	Ancuța Bobocel	Romania	10:05.01	
2nd place, silver medalist(s)	Hanane Ouhaddou	Morocco	10:07.40	
3rd place, bronze medalist(s)	Elsa Delaunay	France	10:48.29	
4	Dana Buchanan	Canada	11:01.92	
	Meredith MacGregor	Canada	DNS	
	Melissa Rizk	Lebanon	DNS	
	Maria Lahrissi	Morocco	DNS	

=== 4 × 100 meters relay ===
October 3

Rank	Lane	Nation	Competitors	Time	Notes
1st place, gold medalist(s)	4	Canada	Chantal Grant, Kimberly Hyacinthe, Teneshia Peart, Geneviève Thibault	44.78	
2nd place, silver medalist(s)	2	France	Lina Jacques-Sébastien, Ayodelé Ikuesan, Amandine Ellard, Aurore Ruet	45.19	
3rd place, bronze medalist(s)	5	Cameroon	Stephanie Belibi, Esther Ndoumbe, Joséphine Mbarga-Bikié, Carole Waboud	46.24	
4	6	Benin	Charlenne Adjele, Claudine Yemalin, Clemence Kombeto, Souliath Saka	48.19	
5	3	Lebanon	Maha El Mouallem, Laura Saliba, Diala El Khazen, Aziza Sbeyti	49.81	
	7	Senegal		DNS	

=== 4 × 400 meters relay ===
October 5

Rank	Nation	Competitors	Time	Notes
1st place, gold medalist(s)	Canada	Vicki Tolton, Kate Ruediger, Kimberly Hyacinthe, Esther Akinsulie	3:35.95	
2nd place, silver medalist(s)	Senegal	Fatou Diabaye, Mame Fatou Faye, Fatou Bintou Fall, Ndeye Fatou Soumah	3:36.27	
3rd place, bronze medalist(s)	Morocco	Naima Ibrahimi, Hayat Lambarki, Lamiae Lhabze, Halima Hachlaf	3:37.72	
4	France	Laetitia Denis, Amandine Ellard, Fanjanteino Félix, Linda Marguet	3:39.09	
5	Benin	Souliath Saka, Clemence Kombeto, Claudine Yemalin, Miel Aydeou	3:44.71	
6	Luxembourg	Chantal Hayen, Martine Nobili, Kim Reuland, Charline Mathias	3:47.54	
	Lebanon	Mirvate Hamze, Elsa Khoury, Françoise Nehme, Manale Tayyar	DQ	FS
	Cameroon		DNS	

=== 10 kilometers walk ===
October 3

Rank	Name	Nationality	Time	Notes
1st place, gold medalist(s)	Chaima Trabelsi	Tunisia	48:27	
2nd place, silver medalist(s)	Christine Guinaudeau	France	49:10	
3rd place, bronze medalist(s)	Megan Huzzey	Canada	50:15	
4	Marina Crivello	Canada	54:19	

=== High jump ===
October 2

Rank	Name	Nationality	1.55	1.65	1.70	1.75	1.80	1.84	1.87	Result	Notes
1st place, gold medalist(s)	Sandrine Champion	France	–	–	o	o	o	xxo	xxx	1.84	
2nd place, silver medalist(s)	Beatrice Lundmark	Switzerland	–	–	o	o	xxo	xxo	xxx	1.84	
3rd place, bronze medalist(s)	Nicole Forrester	Canada	–	–	–	–	o	xxx		1.80	
4	Jillian Drouin	Canada	–	o	o	o	xxx			1.75	
4	Lara Kronauer	Switzerland	–	o	o	o	xxx			1.75	
6	Sarah Boyle	Canada	–	o	o	xxx				1.70	
6	Liz Kuffer	Luxembourg	–	o	o	xxx				1.70	
8	Lissa Labiche	Seychelles	o	o	xxo	xxx				1.70	
9	Karine Bouchakjian	Lebanon	o	xxx						1.55	

=== Pole vault ===
October 2

Rank	Name	Nationality	3.30	3.50	3.70	3.80	3.90	4.00	4.10	4.20	4.25	4.37	Result	Notes
1st place, gold medalist(s)	Telie Mathiot	France	–	–	–	o	–	o	o	xo	o	xxx	4.25	
2nd place, silver medalist(s)	Gabriella Duclos-Lasner	Canada	–	–	–	–	o	–	o	xo	xxx		4.20	
3rd place, bronze medalist(s)	Leanna Wellwood	Canada	–	–	–	o	–	xo	o	xxx			4.10	PB
4	Mélanie Blouin	Quebec	–	o	o	xxx							3.70	
4	Nisrine Dinar	Morocco	–	o	o	–	xxx						3.70	
6	Dayna Maaten	Canada	–	xo	o	xxx							3.70	
6	Petra Pechstein	Switzerland	–	xo	o	xxx							3.70	
8	Stéphanie Vieillevoye	Luxembourg	o	xxo	xxx								3.50	
9	Laetitia Berthier	Burundi	o	xxx									3.30	
	Ariane Beaumont-Courteau	Quebec											DNS	

=== Long jump ===
October 3

Rank	Name	Nationality	#1	#2	#3	#4	#5	#6	Result	Notes
1st place, gold medalist(s)	Alina Militaru	Romania	x	6.49w	6.28	6.24	x	x	6.49w	
2nd place, silver medalist(s)	Vanessa Gladone	France	x	5.97	6.12w	6.24	6.30	6.28	6.30	
3rd place, bronze medalist(s)	Cristina Sandu	Romania	6.27w	3.42w	x	x	x	x	6.27w	
4	Jamaa Chnaik	Morocco	6.26w	5.95	5.98w	6.09	x	x	6.26w	
5	Yah Soucko Koïta	Mali	5.89	6.07w	5.01w	5.82	5.64	5.85w	6.07w	
6	Stéphanie Vaucher	Switzerland	6.01w	x	6.06	5.89	5.88	5.65	6.06	
7	Joséphine Mbarga-Bikié	Cameroon	5.21w	5.65w	6.04	5.76	5.91	5.89	6.04	
8	Yamina Hjaji	Morocco	x	5.90w	5.45	x	5.39	x	5.90w	
9	Naffissa Dkhissi	Morocco	5.51	5.69	5.62				5.69	
10	Beklaryan Haykanush	Armenia	x	5.42	5.66w				5.66w	
11	Pamela Mouele Mboussi	Republic of the Congo	x	x	5.43w				5.43w	
	Kristelle Saneh	Lebanon							DNS	

=== Triple jump ===
October 5

Rank	Name	Nationality	#1	#2	#3	#4	#5	#6	Result	Notes
1st place, gold medalist(s)	Vanessa Gladone	France	12.81	13.40	13.25	x	x	x	13.40	
2nd place, silver medalist(s)	Jamaa Chnaik	Morocco	13.29	13.12	13.17	13.05w	13.10	13.35w	13.35w	
3rd place, bronze medalist(s)	Amy Zongo	France	13.10	13.23	12.87	x	13.27	x	13.27	
4	Kadidia Soura	Burkina Faso	x	12.53	12.58	12.82	12.81	12.68	12.82	
5	Worokia Sanou	Burkina Faso	12.77	12.45	x	12.78	x	12.69w	12.78	
6	Stéphanie Vaucher	Switzerland	12.28	12.59	12.71	x	12.39	12.09	12.71	
7	Beklaryan Haykanush	Armenia	12.66	x	x	x	x	x	12.66	
8	Naffissa Dkhissi	Morocco	12.47	12.65	12.20	x	12.41	12.52	12.65	
	Cristina Sandu	Romania	x	x	x				NM	
	Françoise Mbango Etone	Cameroon							DNS	
	Kristelle Saneh	Lebanon							DNS	

=== Shot put ===
October 1

Rank	Name	Nationality	#1	#2	#3	#4	#5	#6	Result	Notes
1st place, gold medalist(s)	Anca Heltne	Romania	17.80	x	17.21	17.34	x	x	17.80	
2nd place, silver medalist(s)	Jessica Cérival	France	16.99	17.14	16.39	16.61	16.30	17.14	17.14	
3rd place, bronze medalist(s)	Julie Labonté	Canada	14.26	15.93	x	15.68	15.01	x	15.93	
4	Stephanie Jackson	Canada	13.27	14.05	13.68	13.52	13.56	13.97	14.05	
5	Walaa Eldakak	Egypt	13.79	x	13.88	13.83	13.95	13.56	13.95	
6	Maggie Mullen	Canada	12.42	13.45	12.83	12.99	13.04	12.80	13.45	
7	Leyla Karhani	Lebanon	9.74	10.75	11.03	10.87	10.75	11.49	11.49	
	Alifatou Djibril	Togo							DNS	

=== Discus throw ===
October 3

Rank	Name	Nationality	#1	#2	#3	#4	#5	#6	Result	Notes
1st place, gold medalist(s)	Ileana Sorescu	Romania	54.28	52.34	50.86	53.11	x	50.82	54.28	
2nd place, silver medalist(s)	Kazai Suzanne Kragbé	Ivory Coast	47.07	x	53.07	x	53.68	49.04	53.68	
3rd place, bronze medalist(s)	Coralie Glatre	France	41.56	50.26	x	43.23	46.53	51.55	51.55	
4	Alifatou Djibril	Togo	44.65	45.34	x	46.92	51.55	48.73	51.55	
5	Haseib Sara	Egypt	49.93	44.91	47.70	x	47.33	45.88	49.93	
6	Marie-Josée Le Jour	Canada	x	48.49	x	48.69	x	47.64	48.69	
7	Aurélie Meyer	France	46.13	47.31	45.62	x	x	x	47.31	
8	Chantal Spies	Canada	47.03	42.89	x	41.49	x	45.14	47.03	
9	Joeane Jadotte	Haiti	x	44.00	43.82				44.00	
10	Isabelle Boudreau	Quebec	42.03	x	42.39				42.39	
11	Alanna Kovacs	Canada	x	41.64	x				41.64	
12	Myriam Dumont-Breton	Quebec	x	40.27	41.46				41.46	

=== Hammer throw ===
October 4

Rank	Name	Nationality	#1	#2	#3	#4	#5	#6	Result	Notes
1st place, gold medalist(s)	Manuela Montebrun	France	66.57	66.50	68.99	70.26	66.68	x	70.26	GR
2nd place, silver medalist(s)	Bianca Perie	Romania	67.67	66.41	64.01	63.82	62.98	65.55	67.67	
3rd place, bronze medalist(s)	Amélie Perrin	France	66.17	x	60.45	x	62.23	62.96	66.17	
4	Megann Vandervliet	Canada	60.17	x	62.10	60.92	61.02	x	62.10	
5	Taha Rana	Egypt	59.18	57.27	56.24	x	59.62	x	59.62	
6	Hussin Maruia	Egypt	x	58.42	57.53	55.42	x	56.61	58.42	
7	Heather Steacy	Canada	57.62	56.15	x	x	x	x	57.62	
8	Florence Ezeh	Togo	55.49	x	53.25	x	57.19	55.62	57.19	
9	Elisabeth Dubourt	Canada	x	51.05	x				51.05	
10	Kamal Nehal	Egypt	x	46.00	x				46.00	
	Annie Larose	Quebec	x	x	x				NM	
	Joeane Jadotte	Haiti							DNS	

=== Javelin throw ===
October 1

Rank	Name	Nationality	#1	#2	#3	#4	#5	#6	Result	Notes
1st place, gold medalist(s)	Lindy Agricole	Seychelles	54.44	53.23	x	54.64	57.48	x	57.48	GR
2nd place, silver medalist(s)	Hana'a Ramadhan Omar	Egypt	51.22	53.48	52.71	54.03	55.89	51.85	55.89	
3rd place, bronze medalist(s)	Maria Negoita	Romania	53.44	52.92	54.97	55.17	52.67	54.64	55.17	
4	Brooke Pighin	Canada	50.95	48.71	48.73	47.07	51.87	51.72	51.87	
5	Alexia Kogut Kubiak	France	46.51	47.24	50.05	48.70	48.25	48.81	50.05	
6	Deanna Zelinka	Canada	47.57	x	49.44	48.60	49.54	45.72	49.54	
7	Elise Petitjean	Canada	48.74	44.45	46.36	44.18	45.58	x	48.74	
8	Catherine Manigley	Switzerland	x	44.42	44.41	45.60	46.17	39.87	46.17	
9	Monique Djikada	Cameroon	43.61	42.32	41.34				43.61	
10	Jeannette Saiid	Lebanon	30.42	33.74	31.91				33.74	

=== Heptathlon ===
October 3–4

The highest mark recorded in each event is highlighted in yellow

Rank	Athlete	Nationality	100m H	HJ	SP	200m	LJ	JT	800m	Points	Notes
1st place, gold medalist(s)	Gabriella Kouassi	France	14.28	1.73	13.58	27.04	5.40	42.48	2:24.00	5460	
2nd place, silver medalist(s)	Jennifer Cotten	Canada	14.29	1.64	9.88	25.34	5.94	27.01	2:15.92	5230	
3rd place, bronze medalist(s)	Béatrice Kamboulé	Burkina Faso	14.18	1.52	9.60	25.40	5.71	33.37	2:36.99	4861	
4	Nana Blakime	Togo	15.73	1.49	10.37	25.40	5.82	29.08	2:33.26	4669	
5	Bibiana Olama	Equatorial Guinea	16.74	1.46	11.07	28.14	4.45	33.04	2:34.93	4005	
6	Diala El Chab	Lebanon	16.81	1.28	7.80	27.34	4.80	24.14	2:33.88	3594	
