= 2009 French Athletics Championships =

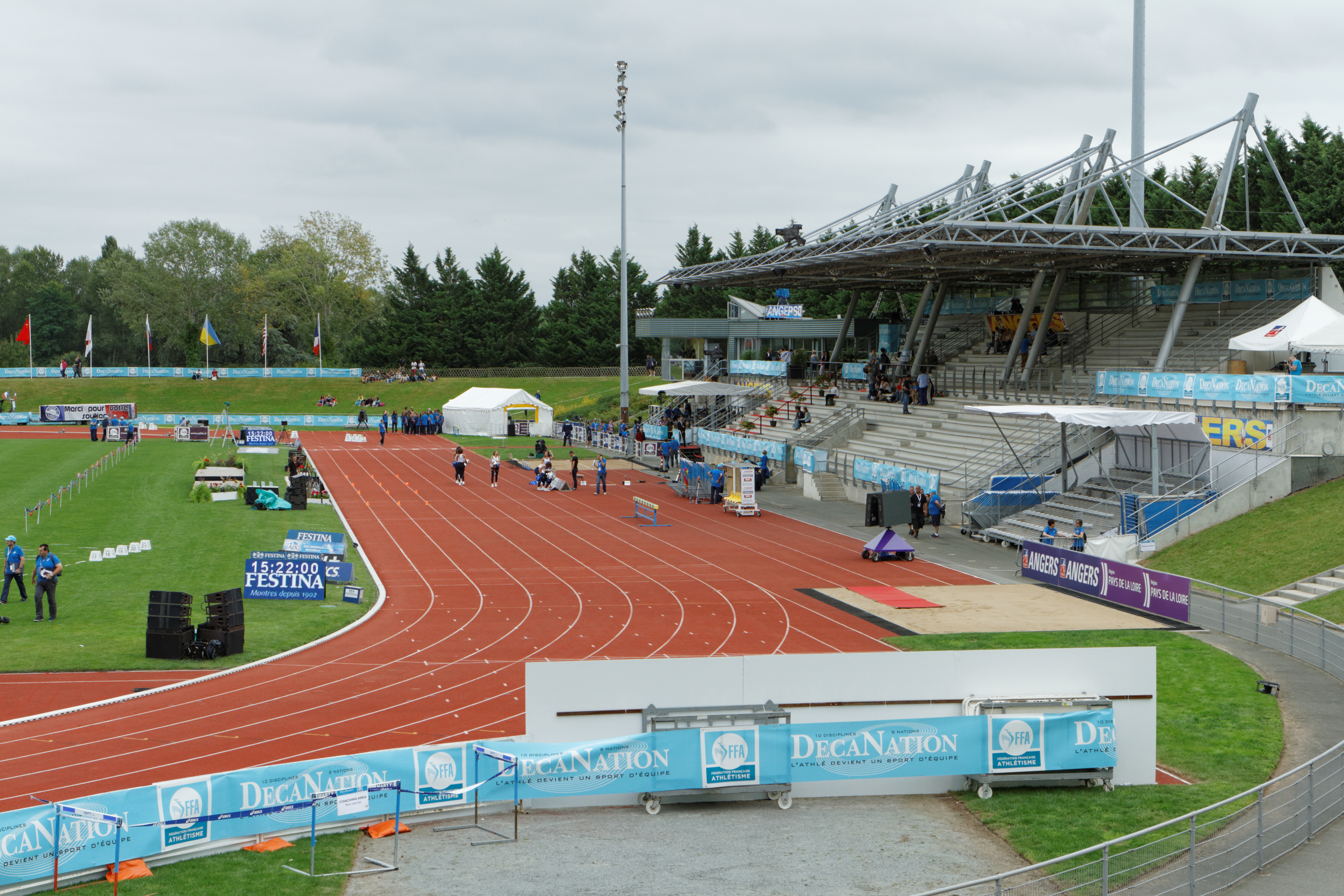
- The host stadium
- Dates: 23–25 July
- Host city: Angers
- Venue: Stade du Lac de Maine
- Events: 38

The 2009 French Athletics Championships was the 121st edition of the national championship in outdoor track and field for France, organised by the French Athletics Federation. It was held on 23–25 July at the Stade du Lac de Maine in Angers. A total of 38 events (divided evenly between the sexes) were contested over the three-day competition. Hind Dehiba won a women's middle-distance double while Vanessa Gladone won both the horizontal jumps.

== Results ==
=== Men ===
Event	Gold		Silver		Bronze	
100 metres	Ronald Pognon	10.39	Emmanuel Ngom Priso	10.46	Oudéré Kankarafou	10.62
200 metres	Martial Mbandjock	20.58	Eddy De Lépine	20.81	David Alerte	20.97
400 metres	Leslie Djhone	45.61	Teddy Venel	45.89	Yoann Décimus	46.51
800 metres	Jeff Lastennet	1:47.01	Kévin Hautcœur	1:48.25	Florent Lacasse	1:48.26
1500 metres	Mehdi Baala	3:45.92	Bouabdellah Tahri	3:46.56	Mounir Yemmouni	3:47.41
5000 metres	Noureddine Smaïl	13:55.81	Mokhtar Benhari	13:56.73	Yohan Durand	13:57.84
10,000 m walk	Yohann Diniz	1:22:50	Antonin Boyez	1:27:05.	Sébastien Biche	1:29:11
110 m hurdles	Dimitri Bascou	13.41	Cédric Lavanne	13.46	Garfield Darien	13.48
400 m hurdles	Héni Kechi	49.93	Sébastien Maillard	50.07	Hugo Grillas	50.40
3000 m s'chase	Vincent Zouaoui-Dandrieux	8:33.80	Vincent Le Dauphin	8:37.19	Irba Lakhal	8:40.06
High jump	Mickaël Hanany	2.28 m	Fabrice Saint-Jean	2.20 m	Mathias Cianci	2.20 m
Pole vault	Romain Mesnil	5.70 m	Renaud Lavillenie	5.55 m	Damiel Dossévi	5.55 m
Long jump	Salim Sdiri	8.11 m	Kafétien Gomis	8.01 m	Frédéric Erin	7.75 m
Triple jump	Teddy Tamgho	17.11 m	Julien Kapek	16.49 m	Karl Taillepierre	16.42 m
Shot put	Yves Niaré	19.39 m	Gaëtan Bucki	19.11 m	Tumatai Dauphin	17.16 m
Discus throw	Bertrand Vili	61.14 m	Jean-François Aurokiom	58.70 m	Jean-Claude Retel	55.75 m
Hammer throw	Jérôme Bortoluzzi	71.80 m	Frédérick Pouzy	69.14 m	Nicolas Figère	68.44 m
Javelin throw	Vitolio Tipotio	77.55 m	Bérenger Demerval	76.75 m	Jean-Baptiste Arnaud	74.50 m
Decathlon	Nadir El Fassi	7733 pts	Franck Logel	7453 pts	Wilfried Gouacide	6983 pts

=== Women ===
Event	Gold		Silver		Bronze	
100 metres	Myriam Soumaré	11.56	Muriel Hurtis-Houairi	11.60	Christine Arron	11.69
200 metres	Johanna Danois	23.07	Lina Jacques-Sébastien	23.14	Muriel Hurtis-Houairi	23.14
400 metres	Solen Désert	52.31	Symphora Béhi	52.91	Aurélie Kamga	53.19
800 metres	Hind Dehiba	2:06.24	Élodie Guégan	2:06.42	Linda Marguet	2:06.46
1500 metres	Hind Dehiba	4:11.87	Fanjanteino Félix	4:12.77	Sophie Duarte	4:15.53
5000 metres	Christine Bardelle	16:35.24	Hélène Guet	16:38.69	Karine Pasquier	16:45.63
20 km walk	Christine Guinaudeau	1:39:59	Anne-Gaëlle Retout	1:43:20	Violaine Averous	1:45:22
100 m hurdles	Sandra Gomis	13.15	Aurore Ruet	13.39	Aisseta Diawara	13.46
400 m hurdles	Aurore Kassambara	56.43	Phara Anacharsis	56.60	Laetitia Denis	57.40
3000 m s'chase	Élodie Olivarès	9:39.39	Elsa Delaunay	10:21.35	Jenny Leonard	10:22.04
High jump	Melanie Melfort	1.92 m	Sandrine Champion	1.86 m	Anne Gaëlle Jardin	1.80 m
Pole vault	Sandra-Helena Tavares	4.35 m	Maria Leonor Tavares	4.30 m	Télie Mathiot	4.25 m
Long jump	Vanessa Gladone	6.40 m	Éloyse Lesueur	6.36 m	Haoua Kessely	6.25 m
Triple jump	Vanessa Gladone	14.13 m	Teresa Nzola Meso Ba	14.10 m	Amy Zongo	13.58 m
Shot put	Jessica Cérival	17.55 m	Laurence Manfredi	17.28 m	Myriam Lixfe	15.25 m
Discus throw	Mélina Robert-Michon	59.30 m	Aurélie Meyer	52.15 m	Coralie Glatre	50.40 m
Hammer throw	Stéphanie Falzon	70.56 m	Manuela Montebrun	69.21 m	Amélie Perrin	69.13 m
Javelin throw	Nadia Vigliano	55.52 m	Alexia Kogut Kubiak	53.21 m	Romina Ugatai	52.70 m
Heptathlon	Marisa De Aniceto	6080 pts	Antoinette Nana Djimou	6032 pts	Gabriela Kouassi	5549 pts
