= 2010 French Indoor Athletics Championships =

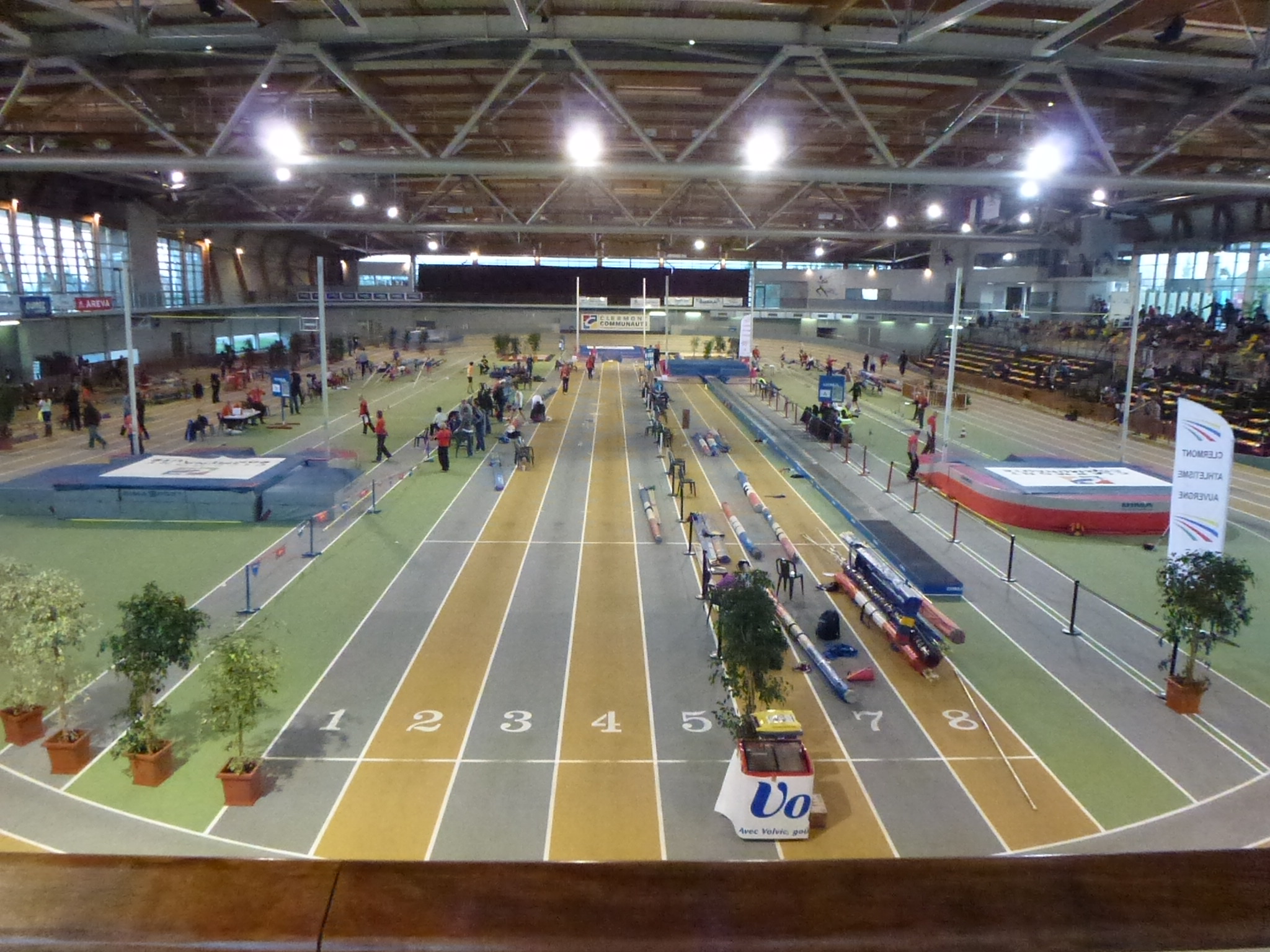
- The host stadium
- Edition: 39th
- Dates: 27–28 February
- Host city: Paris
- Venue: Palais Omnisports de Paris-Bercy
- Events: 26

The 2010 French Indoor Athletics Championships was the 39th edition of the national championship in indoor track and field for France, organised by the French Athletics Federation. It was held on 27–28 February at the Palais Omnisports de Paris-Bercy in Paris. A total of 26 events (divided evenly between the sexes) were contested over the two-day competition.

Three national indoor records were set at the competition. Leslie Djhone broke the French record in the men's 400 metres with a time of 45.85 seconds, Larbi Bourrada set an Algerian record of 5911 points for the men's indoor heptathlon, and Binta Diagana set a Mauritanian record of 14.89 m in the women's shot put.

== Results ==
=== Men ===
Event	Gold		Silver		Bronze	
60 metres	Christophe Lemaitre	6.56	Ronald Pognon	6.61	Teddy Tinmar	6.72
200 metres	Imaad Hallay	21.44 PB	Bruno Naprix	21.48	Antony Couffe	21.70
400 metres	Leslie Djhone	45.85 NR	Nicolas Fillon	46.89 PB	Richard Maunier	47.15 PB
800 metres	Kévin Hautcœur	1:48.61	Samir Dahmani	1:49.13 NJR	Florent Lacasse	1:49.24
1500 metres	Abdelkader Bakhtache	3:42.97	Yoann Kowal	3:43.39	Noureddine Smaïl	3:44.15
60 m hurdles	Ladji Doucouré	7.58	Garfield Darien	7.62 PB	Cédric Lavanne	7.70
5000 m walk	Antonin Boyez	20:00.00	Cédric Houssaye	20:32.42	Franck Baudet	20:40.39
High jump	Mickaël Hanany	2.28 m PB	Abdoulaye Diarra	2.24 m	Mathias Cianci	2.20 m
Pole vault	Renaud Lavillenie	5.85 m PB	Jérôme Clavier	5.60 m	Damiel Dossévi	5.60 m
Long jump	Salim Sdiri	8.24 m	Kafétien Gomis	8.21 m PB	Ndiss Kaba Badji (SEN)	8.01 m PB
Triple jump	Colomba Fofana	17.16 m PB	Teddy Tamgho	17.01 m	Benjamin Compaoré	16.93 m PB
Shot put	Gaëtan Bucki	19.05 m	Tumatai Dauphin	18.51 m	Jean-Luc Mastromauro	17.55 m
Heptathlon	Larbi Bourrada (ALG)	5911 pts NR	Nadir El Fassi	5883 pts	Franck Logel	5787 pts

=== Women ===
Event	Gold		Silver		Bronze	
60 metres	Myriam Soumaré	7.21	Véronique Mang	7.21 PB	Céline Distel	7.32 PB
200 metres	Lina Jacques-Sébastien	23.39	Cornnelly Calydon	24.23 PB	Wendy Pascal	24.32
400 metres	Virginie Michanol	52.90 PB	Laetitia Denis	53.29 PB	Marie-Angélique Lacordelle	53.98 PB
800 metres	Linda Marguet	2:04.54 PB	Jennifer Lozano	2:06.04	Clarisse Moh	2:07.21
1500 metres	Fanjanteino Félix	4:15.50	Hind Dehiba	4:16.09	Laura Miclo	4:18.74 PB
60 m hurdles	Alice Decaux	8.06 PB	Aisseta Diawara	8.18 PB	Cindy Billaud	8.20
3000 m walk	Christine Guinaudeau	13:05.63 PB	Melissa Cartier	13:49.97	Anne-Gaëlle Retout	13:55.92
High jump	Deirdre Ryan (IRL)	1.90 m	Mélanie Melfort	1.90 m	Sandrine Champion	1.84 m PB
Pole vault	Marion Buisson	4.30 m	Telie Mathiot	4.20 m	Sandra-Hélèna Homo (POR)	4.15 m
Long jump	Vanessa Gladone	6.48 m PB	Eunice Barber	6.37 m	Kathy Turlepin	6.28 m PB
Triple jump	Teresa Nzola Meso Ba	13.93 m	Nelly Tchayem	13.50 m	Sokhna Galle	13.27 m PB
Shot put	Laurence Manfredi	17.46 m	Jessica Cérival	17.22 m PB	Myriam Lixfe	15.52 m PB
Pentathlon	Antoinette Nana Djimou	4633 pts PB	Gabriela Kouassi	4273 pts PB	Marisa De Aniceto	4251 pts PB
