= Athletics at the 2009 Jeux de la Francophonie =

Athletic competition

Athletics at the VI Francophonie Games
- Dates: 1–6 October 2009
- Host city: Beirut, Lebanon
- Venue: Camille Chamoun Sports City Stadium
- Events: 46
- Participation: 398 athletes from 36 nations
- Records set: 5 Games records

At the 2009 Jeux de la Francophonie, the athletics events were held at the Camille Chamoun Sports City Stadium from 1 to 6 October. A total of 46 track and field events were contested.

== Medal summary ==
=== Men ===
Event	Gold		Silver		Bronze	
100 metres	Ben Youssef Meité (CIV)	10.15 (w)	Aziz Ouhadi (MAR)	10.31 (w)	Mamadou Lamine Niang (SEN)	10.32 (w)
200 metres	Ben Youssef Meité (CIV)	20.37	Stéphan Buckland (MRI)	20.59	Khalid Zougari (MAR)	20.77
400 metres	Eric Milazar (MRI)	46.00	Mathieu Gnanligo (BEN)	46.03	Marouane Maadadi (MAR)	46.54
800 metres	Amine Laâlou (MAR)	1:46.68	Abdoulaye Wagne (SEN)	1:47.48	Mohcine El Amine (MAR)	1:47.76
1500 metres	Amine Laâlou (MAR)	3:51.59	Fouad Elkaam (MAR)	3:51.85	Matthew Lincoln (CAN)	3:53.61
5000 metres	Chakir Boujattaoui (MAR)	13:42.72	Anis Selmouni (MAR)	13:43.73	Hicham Bellani (MAR)	13:45.53
10,000 metres	Dieudonné Disi (RWA)	29:38.68	Anis Selmouni (MAR)	29:39.07	Hicham Bellani (MAR)	29:43.39
110 metres hurdles	Jared MacLeod (CAN)	13.56 GR	Alexandru Mihăilescu (ROU)	13.92	Aymen Ben Ahmeda (TUN)	14.07
400 metres hurdles	Fadil Bellaabouss (FRA)	50.23	Sébastien Maillard (FRA)	50.35	Mamadou Kassé Hanne (SEN)	50.69
3000 metres steeplechase	Abdellatif Chamlal (MAR)	8:40.18	Chakir Boujattaoui (MAR)	8:41.06	Amor Yahya (TUN)	8:48.30
4 × 100 metres relay	Burkina Faso (BUR); Siaka Son; Idrissa Sanou; Innocent Bologo; Gérard Kobiane	39.57	Mauritius (MRI); Fabrice Coiffic; Eric Milazar; Henrico Louis; Stéphan Buckland	39.60	Senegal (SEN); Alassane Diallo; Mamadou Lamine Niang; Niang Oumar; Abdourahmane Ndour	39.87
4 × 400 metres relay	Senegal (SEN); Mamadou Kassé Hanne; Abdoulaye Wagne; Assane Thiam; Mamadou Gueye	3:06.93	Morocco (MAR); Ismael Daif; Abdelkrim Khoudri; Younés Belkaifa; Amine Laâlou	3:07.46	Mauritius (MRI); Antonio Vieillesse; Fernando Augustin; Ian Monet; Eric Milazar	3:08.29
Marathon	Zäid Laâroussi (MAR)	2:24:08	Felix Ntirenganya (RWA)	2:24:23	Ahmed Nasef (MAR)	2:24:44
20 km walk	Hervé Davaux (FRA)	1:25:35	Hassanine Sebei (TUN)	1:28:30	Bertrand Moulinet (FRA)	1:31:02
High jump	Mihai Donisan (ROU)	2.24 m	Mathias Cianci (FRA)	2.20 m	Mark Dillon (CAN)	2.20 m
Pole vault	Vincent Favretto (FRA)	5.40 m	Kristian Wilson (CAN)	5.10 m	David Foley (CAN)	5.00 m
Long jump	Yahya Berrabah (MAR)	8.40 m GR, NR	Ndiss Kaba Badji (SEN)	8.32 m	Julien Fivaz (SUI)	7.76 m
Triple jump	Hugo Mamba Schlick (CMR)	16.78 m	Alin Anghel (ROU)	16.24 m	Julien Kapek (FRA)	16.23 m
Shot put	Tumatai Dauphin (FRA)	18.63 m	Yasser Ibrahim Farag (EGY)	18.09 m	Laurențiu Popa (ROU)	17.17 m
Discus throw	Omar Ahmed El Ghazaly (EGY)	61.01 m	Yasser Ibrahim Farag (EGY)	59.56 m	Jean-François Aurokiom (FRA)	59.46 m
Hammer throw	Mohsen El Anany (EGY)	71.30 m	Frédérick Pouzy (FRA)	68.24 m	Jérôme Bortoluzzi (FRA)	68.03 m
Javelin throw	Ihab Al Sayed Abdelrahman (EGY)	77.33 m GR	Curtis Moss (CAN)	75.74 m	Levente Bartha (ROU)	74.65 m
Decathlon	Massimo Bertocchi (CAN)	8053 pts	François Gourmet (Wallonia)	7660 pts	Jamie Adjetey-Nelson (CAN)	7602 pts

=== Women ===
Event	Gold		Silver		Bronze	
100 metres	Geneviève Thibault (CAN)	11.55 (w)	Kadiatou Camara (MLI)	11.73 (w)	Chantal Grant (CAN)	11.74 (w)
200 metres	Kaltouma Nadjina (CHA)	23.09	Kimberly Hyacinthe (CAN)	23.15	Esther Akinsulie (CAN)	23.63
400 metres	Kaltouma Nadjina (CHA)	51.04	Fatou Bintou Fall (SEN)	52.90	Ndeye Fatou Soumah (SEN)	53.21
800 metres	Seltana Ait Hammou (MAR)	2:02.62	Halima Hachlaf (MAR)	2:02.76	Linda Marguet (FRA)	2:03.15
1500 metres	Btissam Lakhouad (MAR)	4:21.56	Siham Hilali (MAR)	4:21.56	Seltana Ait Hammou (MAR)	4:21.79
5000 metres	Bouchra Chaabi (MAR)	16:23.05	Hanane Ouhaddou (MAR)	16:27.51	Thérese Ngono Etoundi (CMR)	16:31.08
10,000 metres	Claudette Mukasakindi (RWA)	35:32.60	Bouchra Chaâbi (MAR)	35:32.87	Maria Laghrissi (MAR)	37:53.14
100 metres hurdles	Élisabeth Davin (Wallonia)	13.32	Gnima Faye (SEN)	13.35	Anne Zagré (Wallonia)	13.37
400 metres hurdles	Hayat Lambarki (MAR)	58.40	Lamiae Lhabze (MAR)	58.81	Carole Kaboud Mebam (CMR)	58.85
3000 metres steeplechase	Ancuța Bobocel (ROU)	10:05.01	Hanane Ouhaddou (MAR)	10:07.40	Elsa Delaunay (FRA)	10:48.29
4 × 100 metres relay	Canada (CAN); Chantal Grant; Kimberly Hyacinthe; Teneshia Peart; Geneviève Thibault	44.78	France (FRA); Lina Jacques-Sébastien; Ayodelé Ikuesan; Amandine Elard; Aurore Ruet	45.19	Cameroon (CMR); Stephanie Belibi; Esther Ndoumbe; Joséphine Mbarga-Bikié; Carole Waboud	46.24
4 × 400 metres relay	Canada (CAN); Vicki Tolton; Kate Ruediger; Kimberly Hyacinthe; Esther Akinsulie	3:35.95	Senegal (SEN); Fatou Diabaye; Mame Fatou Faye; Fatou Bintou Fall; Ndeye Fatou Soumah	3:36.27	Morocco (MAR); Naima Ibrahimi; Hayat Lambarki; Lamiae Lhabze; Halima Hachlaf	3:37.72
Marathon	Epiphanie Nyirabaramé (RWA)	2:44:36	Adeline Roche (FRA)	3:03:18	Not awarded	
10 km walk	Chaima Trabelsi (TUN)	48:27	Christine Guinaudeau (FRA)	49:10	Megan Huzzey (CAN)	50.15
High jump	Sandrine Champion (FRA)	1.84 m	Beatrice Lundmark (SUI)	1.84 m	Nicole Forrester (CAN)	1.80 m
Pole vault	Télie Mathiot (FRA)	4.25 m	Gabriella Duclos-Lasnier (CAN)	4.20 m	Leanna Wellwood (CAN)	4.10 m
Long jump	Alina Militaru (ROU)	6.49 m	Vanessa Gladone (FRA)	6.30 m	Cristina Sandu (ROU)	6.27 m
Triple jump	Vanessa Gladone (FRA)	13.40 m	Jamaa Chnaik (MAR)	13.35 m	Amy Zongo (FRA)	13.27 m
Shot put	Anca Heltne (ROU)	17.80 m	Jessica Cérival (FRA)	17.14 m	Julie Labonté (CAN)	15.93 m
Discus throw	Ileana Sorescu (ROU)	54.28 m	Kazai Suzanne Kragbé (CIV)	53.68 m	Coralie Glatre (FRA)	51.55 m
Hammer throw	Manuela Montebrun (FRA)	70.26 m GR	Bianca Perie (ROU)	67.67 m	Amelie Perrin (FRA)	66.17 m
Javelin throw	Lindy Leveau-Agricole (SEY)	57.48 m GR	Hana'a Ramadhan Omar (EGY)	55.89 m	Maria Negoiță (ROU)	55.17 m
Heptathlon	Gabriella Kouassi (FRA)	5460 pts	Jennifer Cotten (CAN)	5230 pts	Béatrice Kamboulé (BUR)	4861 pts

== Medal table ==
Rank	Nation	Gold	Silver	Bronze	Total
1	Morocco	10	13	9	32
2	France	9	8	10	27
3	Canada	5	5	10	20
4	Romania	5	3	4	12
5	Egypt	3	3	0	6
6	Rwanda	3	1	0	4
7	Ivory Coast	2	1	0	3
8	Chad	2	0	0	2
9	Senegal	1	5	4	10
10	Mauritius	1	2	1	4
11	Tunisia	1	1	2	4
12	(Wallonia) French Community of Belgium	1	1	1	3
13	Cameroon	1	0	3	4
14	Burkina Faso	1	0	1	2
15	Seychelles	1	0	0	1
16	Switzerland	0	1	1	2
17	Benin	0	1	0	1
17	Mali	0	1	0	1
Totals (18 entries)		46	46	46	138

== Games records ==
Name	Event	Country	Record
Jared MacLeod	110 metres hurdles	Canada	13.56 seconds
Yahya Berrabah	Long jump	Morocco	8.40 m
Ihab Al Sayed Abdelrahman	Javelin throw	Egypt	77.33 m
Lindy Agricole	Javelin throw	Seychelles	57.48 m
Manuela Montebrun	Hammer throw	France	70.26 m

== Participation ==
Key: Country (no. of athletes)

- Armenia (3)
- (Wallonia) French Community of Belgium (6)
- Benin (8)
- Burkina Faso (11)
- Burundi (8)
- Cambodia (1)
- Cameroon (15)
- Canada (65)
  - New Brunswick (7)
  - Quebec (10)
- Central African Republic (4)
- Chad (5)
- Ivory Coast (6)
- Democratic Republic of the Congo (7)
- Djibouti (4)
- Egypt (14)
- Equatorial Guinea (4)
- France (55)
- Guinea-Bissau (2)
- Haiti (1)
- Lebanon (34) (host)
- Luxembourg (8)
- Mali (4)
- Mauritius (13)
- Monaco (1)
- Morocco (33)
- Niger (2)
- Republic of the Congo (4)
- Romania (15)
- Rwanda (7)
- Senegal (18)
- Seychelles (3)
- Switzerland (9)
- Togo (3)
- Tunisia (5)
- Vietnam (2)
