= Chakir Boujattaoui =

Moroccan long-distance runner

Medal record

Men's athletics

Representing Morocco

Mediterranean Games
Silver medal – second place	2009 Pescara	3000 m st.

Jeux de la Francophonie
Gold medal – first place	2009 Beirut	5000 m
Silver medal – second place	2009 Beirut	3000 m st.

Chakir Boujattaoui (born 16 January 1983 in Nador) is a Moroccan long-distance runner who specialises in cross country running, and the 5000 metres and steeplechase on the track.

He won his first medal at the 2009 Mediterranean Games, taking the silver in the 5000 m. At the 2009 World Championships in Athletics, he finished eleventh, before finishing his year with the 5000 m gold and the 3000 m steeplechase silver at the 2009 Jeux de la Francophonie. Boujattaoui has competed at the IAAF World Cross Country Championships and finished eighth at the 2009 race and twelfth in 2010. He was disqualified from the 2010 event after failing a test for the banned substance MIRCERA and he was suspended from competition for two years.

== Career ==
A late comer to professional athletics, Boujattaoui began to compete internationally in 2008. His first major competition was the 2008 IAAF World Cross Country Championships, where he finished in 40th place. The following year he had much improved and finished in eighth place at the 2009 IAAF World Cross Country Championships, leading the Moroccan men's team to sixth place in the rankings. He then represented his country at the 2009 Mediterranean Games and he recorded a personal best of 8:13.83 minutes in the 3000 metres steeplechase for the silver medal. He was beaten to the gold by teammate Jamel Chatbi, who failed a drugs test two months later (testing positive for clenbuterol).

Boujattaoui recorded a new 5000 metres personal best of 13:09.62 at the Golden Gala a week later, and he was selected to represent Morocco at the 2009 World Championships in Athletics. He made it to the 5000 metres final of the World Championships and finished in eleventh position, beating more experienced compatriot Anis Selmouni. He closed the year with a performance at the 2009 Jeux de la Francophonie where he claimed the silver in the steeplechase, before going on to win the gold medal in the 5000 m.

At the 2010 IAAF World Cross Country Championships, he finished in twelfth position (again leading the Moroccan team which finished fourth on this occasion). However, his performance did not stand as he failed a pre-competition drugs test for MIRCERA (an variant on the banned blood booster EPO). He was banned from competition for two years, with the suspension lasting until May 2012. His disqualification also meant Morocco were moved to fifth in the team rankings at the World Cross Country Championships.

== Personal bests ==
Event	Time (sec)	Venue	Date
3000 metres	7:41.21	Lausanne, Switzerland	7 July 2009
3000 metres steeplechase	8:13.83	Rome, Italy	10 July 2009
5000 metres	13:09.62	Pescara, Italy	2 July 2009

- All information taken from IAAF profile.

== Competition record ==
Year	Competition	Venue	Position	Event	Notes
2008	World Cross Country Championships	Edinburgh, Scotland	40th	Senior race	Individual
2009	World Cross Country Championships	Amman, Jordan	8th	Senior race	Individual
2009	World Cross Country Championships	Amman, Jordan	6th	Senior race	Team
2009	Mediterranean Games	Pescara, Italy	2nd	5000 m	
2009	World Championships in Athletics	Berlin, Germany	11th	5000 m	
2009	Jeux de la Francophonie	Beirut, Lebanon	2nd	3000 m st	8:41.06
2009	Jeux de la Francophonie	Beirut, Lebanon	1st	5000 m	13:42.72
2010	World Cross Country Championships	Bydgoszcz, Poland	12th (DQ)	Senior race	Individual
2010	World Cross Country Championships	Bydgoszcz, Poland	4th (DQ)	Senior race	Team

== See also ==
- List of doping cases in athletics
