= 2008 African Championships in Athletics – Men's 100 metres =

The men's 100 metres event at the 2008 African Championships in Athletics was held at the Addis Ababa Stadium on April 30–May 1.

== Medalists ==
Gold	Silver	Bronze
Olusoji Fasuba; Nigeria	Uchenna Emedolu; Nigeria	Hannes Dreyer; South Africa

== Results ==
=== Heats ===
Qualification: First 3 of each heat (Q) and the next 6 fastest (q) qualified for the semifinals.

Wind: Heat 1: -3.9 m/s, Heat 2: -1.2 m/s, Heat 3: -1.4 m/s, Heat 4: -0.5 m/s, Heat 5: -0.5 m/s, Heat 6: -0.4 m/s

Rank	Heat	Name	Nationality	Time	Notes
1	3	Amr Ibrahim Mostafa Seoud	Egypt	10.35	Q, NR
2	4	Hannes Dreyer	South Africa	10.38	Q
3	5	Uchenna Emedolu	Nigeria	10.39	Q
4	5	Aziz Ouhadi	Morocco	10.43	Q
5	2	Suwaibou Sanneh	Gambia	10.43	Q, NR
5	3	Katim Touré	Senegal	10.43	Q
7	4	Hitjivirue Kaanjuka	Namibia	10.44	Q
8	3	Tom Musinde	Kenya	10.47	Q
9	2	Khalid Idrissi Zougari	Morocco	10.47	Q
10	2	Isaac Uche	Nigeria	10.48	Q
11	4	Idrissa Sanou	Burkina Faso	10.50	Q
12	5	Allah Laryea-Akrong	Ghana	10.51	Q
13	2	Eric Nkansah	Ghana	10.52	q
14	1	Béranger Aymard Bosse	Central African Republic	10.52	Q
15	1	Wilfried Bingangoye	Gabon	10.52	Q
16	5	Fabrice Coiffic	Mauritius	10.57	q
17	6	Stéphan Buckland	Mauritius	10.59	Q
18	6	Wetere Galcha	Ethiopia	10.61	Q, NR
19	1	Olusoji Fasuba	Nigeria	10.62	Q
20	3	Alain Olivier Nyounai	Cameroon	10.66	q
21	6	Abdourahmane Ndour	Senegal	10.72	Q
22	6	Youssouf Mhadjou	Comoros	10.72	q
23	4	Abyot Lencho	Ethiopia	10.72	q
24	6	Nabie Foday Fofanah	Guinea	10.74	q
25	3	Okatakyie Akwasi Afrifa	Ghana	10.75	
26	2	Idrissa Adam	Cameroon	10.76	
27	1	Roger Angouono-Moke	Republic of the Congo	10.80	
28	2	Mohammed-jud Misbah	Ethiopia	10.81	
29	1	Tidiane Coulibaly	Mali	11.04	
30	4	Éric Pacôme N'Dri	Ivory Coast	11.08	
31	3	Isaac Jones	Gambia	11.09	
32	5	Seydou Ouédraogo	Ivory Coast	11.11	
33	6	Ghyd-Kermeliss-Holly Olonghot	Republic of the Congo	11.14	
34	5	Ismaïla Tcheuko	Cameroon	11.19	
35	4	Islam Mulinda	Rwanda	11.36	
36	5	Moussa Camara	Guinea	11.40	
37	4	Mohamed Hassan Ali	Somalia	12.49	
	1	Mussa Mlekwa	Tanzania	DNS	
	1	Temba Ncube	Zimbabwe	DNS	
	2	Yasini Mihndini	Tanzania	DNS	
	3	Haita Bonyafala	Democratic Republic of the Congo	DNS	
	3	Francis Zimwara	Zimbabwe	DNS	
	4	Moumi Sebergue	Chad	DNS	
	6	David Tinago	Zimbabwe	DNS	

=== Semifinals ===
Qualification: First 2 of each semifinal (Q) and the next 2 fastest (q) qualified for the final.

Wind: Heat 1: +0.4 m/s, Heat 2: +0.5 m/s, Heat 3: +0.5 m/s

Rank	Heat	Name	Nationality	Time	Notes
1	3	Olusoji Fasuba	Nigeria	10.27	Q
2	1	Hannes Dreyer	South Africa	10.36	Q
2	2	Uchenna Emedolu	Nigeria	10.36	Q
4	2	Idrissa Sanou	Burkina Faso	10.38	Q
5	3	Aziz Ouhadi	Morocco	10.40	Q
6	3	Amr Ibrahim Mostafa Seoud	Egypt	10.40	q
7	2	Hitjivirue Kaanjuka	Namibia	10.40	q
8	1	Wilfried Bingangoye	Gabon	10.48	Q
9	1	Allah Laryea-Akrong	Ghana	10.48	
10	1	Isaac Uche	Nigeria	10.49	
11	1	Katim Touré	Senegal	10.50	
12	3	Eric Nkansah	Ghana	10.51	
13	3	Stéphan Buckland	Mauritius	10.54	
14	1	Béranger Aymard Bosse	Central African Republic	10.58	
15	2	Khalid Idrissi Zougari	Morocco	10.58	
16	2	Suwaibou Sanneh	Gambia	10.63	
17	3	Nabie Foday Fofanah	Guinea	10.65	
18	3	Tom Musinde	Kenya	10.66	
19	2	Youssouf Mhadjou	Comoros	10.68	
20	1	Fabrice Coiffic	Mauritius	10.72	
21	1	Abyot Lencho	Ethiopia	10.81	
22	3	Wetere Galcha	Ethiopia	10.81	
23	2	Abdourahmane Ndour	Senegal	10.90	
24	2	Alain Olivier Nyounai	Cameroon	10.92	

=== Final ===
Wind: +1.2 m/s

Rank	Lane	Name	Nationality	Time	Notes
1st place, gold medalist(s)	6	Olusoji Fasuba	Nigeria	10.10	SB
2nd place, silver medalist(s)	5	Uchenna Emedolu	Nigeria	10.21	SB
3rd place, bronze medalist(s)	3	Hannes Dreyer	South Africa	10.24	PB
4	4	Idrissa Sanou	Burkina Faso	10.41	
5	1	Hitjivirue Kaanjuka	Namibia	10.50	
6	8	Wilfried Bingangoye	Gabon	10.54	
7	7	Aziz Ouhadi	Morocco	11.13	
	2	Amr Ibrahim Mostafa Seoud	Egypt	DNS	
