= 2014 Pan American Combined Events Cup =

- Organisers: APA
- Edition: 9th
- Date: July 16–18
- Host city: Ottawa, Ontario, Canada
- Venue: Terry Fox Stadium
- Participation: 41 + 48 guests athletes from 10 nations

The 2014 Pan American Combined Events Cup was held in Ottawa, Ontario, Canada, at the Terry Fox Stadium on July 16–18, 2014. The event was hosted by the Ottawa Lions Track and Field Club, and served also as the Canadian Championships. For the first time, junior categories were included in the cup, while there were also three Canadian competitors in a youth category.

A detailed report on the event and an appraisal of the results was given.

Complete results were published.

== Medallists ==
Event	Gold		Silver		Bronze	
Men's Decathlon Senior	Yordanis García; Cuba	8179	José Mendieta; Cuba	7559	James Turner; Canada	7408
Women's Heptathlon Senior	Natasha Jackson; Canada	5928	Lindsay Schwartz; United States	5835	Rachael McIntosh; Canada	5763
Men's Decathlon Junior	Steele Wasik; United States	7004	Hellerson Pereira da Costa; Brazil	6853	Vincent Lanctôt-Reeves; Canada	6647
Women's Heptathlon Junior	Genevieve Gagné; Canada	5028	Lais da Silva Pereira; Brazil	4886	Allison Frantz; Canada	4718

== Results ==
=== Men's Decathlon Senior ===
Key

The highest mark recorded in each event is highlighted in yellow

Rank	Athlete	Overall points	100 m	LJ	SP	HJ	400 m	110 m H	DT	PV	JT	1500 m
1st place, gold medalist(s)	Yordanis García; Cuba	8179	926; 10.71 s w:1.1	795; 6.92 m w:1.6	801; 15.19 m	850; 2.05 m	899; 48.20 s	934; 14.32 s w:1.5	628; 38.18 m	790; 4.60 m	857; 67.90 m	699; 4:36.98 min
2nd place, silver medalist(s)	José Mendieta; Cuba	7559	810; 11.23 s w:1.1	862; 7.20 m w:1.8	789; 14.99 m	714; 1.90 m	807; 50.16 s	887; 14.69 s w:1.5	638; 38.67 m	702; 4.30 m	732; 59.61 m	618; 4:50.12 min
3rd place, bronze medalist(s)	James Turner; Canada	7408	854; 11.03 s w:0.6	814; 7.00 m w:2.3	626; 12.32 m	636; 1.81 m	831; 49.65 s	854; 14.96 s w:1.7	699; 41.67 m	645; 4.10 m	678; 55.99 m	771; 4:25.95 min
4	Pat Arbour; Canada	7385	776; 11.39 s w:3.8	792; 6.91 m w:0.9	766; 14.61 m	740; 1.93 m	683; 52.97 s	817; 15.27 s w:0.5	794; 46.30 m	731; 4.40 m	735; 59.81 m	551; 5:01.51 min
5	Juan Carlos de la Cruz; Dominican Republic	7247	878; 10.92 s w:3.8	807; 6.97 m w:2.6	658; 12.85 m	740; 1.93 m	759; 51.23 s	841; 15.07 s w:1.2	597; 36.66 m	673; 4.20 m	637; 53.24 m	657; 4:43.67 min
6	Devin Dick; United States	7133	759; 11.47 s w:0.6	788; 6.89 m w:3.5	737; 14.14 m	714; 1.90 m	757; 51.26 s	787; 15.53 s w:1.5	585; 36.05 m	819; 4.70 m	601; 50.85 m	586; 4:55.41 min
7	Kurtis Brondyke; United States	7090	778; 11.38 s w:0.6	760; 6.77 m w:1.2	687; 13.32 m	740; 1.93 m	735; 51.77 s	852; 14.98 s w:1.7	698; 41.64 m	673; 4.20 m	579; 49.37 m	588; 4:55.20 min
–	Craig Thomas; University of Calgary Athletics Club/Canada	7041	711; 11.70 s w:1.1	723; 6.61 m w:1.9	681; 13.23 m	740; 1.93 m	658; 53.56 s	827; 15.19 s w:1.7	626; 38.12 m	790; 4.60 m	580; 49.39 m	705; 4:36.15 min
8	Derek Masterson; United States	6954	736; 11.58 s w:3.8	668; 6.37 m w:2.9	702; 13.57 m	687; 1.87 m	718; 52.16 s	753; 15.82 s w:0.5	640; 38.80 m	790; 4.60 m	688; 56.67 m	572; 4:57.83 min
–	Roman Garibay; Aldebaran Track and Field/Mexico	6821	782; 11.36 s w:0.6	682; 6.43 m w:2.3	676; 13.15 m	687; 1.87 m	714; 52.25 s	655; 16.71 s w:1.2	662; 39.85 m	562; 3.80 m	804; 64.41 m	597; 4:53.69 min
9	Ivan Staeheli; Canada	6685	786; 11.34 s w:3.8	716; 6.58 m w:3.5	609; 12.04 m	687; 1.87 m	725; 52.00 s	666; 16.61 s w:1.7	484; 30.98 m	645; 4.10 m	672; 55.59 m	695; 4:37.66 min
–	Chris Robertson; Athlétisme Sud-est/South-East Athletics/Canada	6598	719; 11.66 s w:1.1	716; 6.58 m w:1.1	554; 11.14 m	636; 1.81 m	746; 51.52 s	791; 15.49 s w:1.2	648; 39.20 m	562; 3.80 m	608; 51.29 m	618; 4:50.13 min
10	Manuel Alejandro González; Cuba	6493	767; 11.43 s w:1.1	828; 7.06 m w:1.8	716; 13.80 m	661; 1.84 m	0 DQ	873; 14.81 s w:0.5	575; 35.57 m	731; 4.40 m	600; 50.76 m	742; 4:30.33 min
–	Jay Petsch; Unattached/United States	6485	782; 11.36 s w:0.6	778; 6.85 m w:3.5	554; 11.13 m	636; 1.81 m	762; 51.16 s	773; 15.65 s w:0.5	482; 30.87 m	760; 4.50 m	515; 44.97 m	443; 5:21.41 min
–	Dylan Golow; Saint-Laurent Sélect/Canada	6371	622; 12.15 s w:1.1	691; 6.47 m w:0.1	595; 11.82 m	661; 1.84 m	638; 54.04 s	693; 16.36 s w:2.1	547; 34.16 m	617; 4.00 m	566; 48.45 m	741; 4:30.62 min
–	Shawn Beaudoin; Windsor Legion Track & Field Club/Canada	6284	806; 11.25 s w:3.8	584; 5.99 m w:3.7	510; 10.40 m	585; 1.75 m	806; 50.18 s	741; 15.93 s w:2.1	444; 28.97 m	590; 3.90 m	466; 41.65 m	752; 4:28.81 min
–	Matthew Johnson; Ottawa Lions Track and Field Club/Canada	6265	693; 11.79 s w:0.9	673; 6.39 m w:2.3	456; 9.50 m	636; 1.81 m	714; 52.24 s	656; 16.70 s w:1.7	440; 28.74 m	702; 4.30 m	522; 45.48 m	773; 4:25.73 min
–	Jason Mackenzie; Athlétisme Sud-est/South-East Athletics/Canada	6153	697; 11.77 s w:1.1	632; 6.21 m w:1.6	537; 10.86 m	636; 1.81 m	698; 52.61 s	744; 15.90 s w:2.1	478; 30.70 m	406; 3.20 m	480; 42.61 m	845; 4:15.18 min
–	Justin Conlon; Waterloo Track Club/Canada	6008	705; 11.73 s w:0.9	637; 6.23 m w:3.1	637; 12.51 m	661; 1.84 m	651; 53.72 s	608; 17.16 s w:2.1	525; 33.08 m	535; 3.70 m	485; 42.97 m	564; 4:59.22 min
–	Kerinde Silva; Powerade Brazil/Brazil	5940	823; 11.17 s w:1.1	753; 6.74 m w:1.3	559; 11.21 m	687; 1.87 m	770; 50.99 s	781; 15.58 s w:1.2	475; 30.54 m	0 NH	442; 40.00 m	650; 4:44.94 min
DNF	Rodrigo Sagaon; Aldebaran Track and Field/Mexico	5725	808; 11.24 s w:1.1	619; 6.15 m w:1.9	612; 12.10 m	585; 1.75 m	902; 48.15 s	823; 15.22 s w:1.5	759; 44.61 m	617; 4.00 m	0 DNS	DNS
–	Zachary Quevillon; Ottawa Lions Track and Field Club/Canada	5662	728; 11.62 s w:1.1	619; 6.15 m w:1.7	533; 10.79 m	536; 1.69 m	705; 52.45 s	384; 19.57 s w:2.1	543; 33.96 m	457; 3.40 m	559; 47.98 m	598; 4:53.39 min
–	Kevin Nault; Ottawa Lions Track and Field Club/Canada	5479	819; 11.19 s w:3.8	584; 5.99 m w:1.9	552; 11.10 m	585; 1.75 m	651; 53.73 s	726; 16.06 s w:2.1	320; 22.55 m	333; 2.90 m	390; 36.39 m	519; 5:07.28 min
DNF	Martín Cedeño; Dominican Republic	5154	843; 11.08 s w:1.1	673; 6.39 m w:-0.4	634; 12.46 m	560; 1.72 m	794; 50.44 s	687; 16.41 s w:1.2	557; 34.67 m	406; 3.20 m	0 DNS	DNS
–	Michael Przystupa; Unattached/Canada	4989	725; 11.63 s w:1.1	641; 6.25 m w:1.1	431; 9.08 m	560; 1.72 m	694; 52.70 s	715; 16.16 s w:1.2	349; 24.05 m	309; 2.80 m	0 NM	565; 4:59.05 min
–	Ethan Turpen; Arkansas State University/United States	4592	721; 11.65 s w:0.6	707; 6.54 m w:1.5	630; 12.39 m	687; 1.87 m	679; 53.05 s	612; 17.12 s w:0.5	556; 34.63 m	0 DNS	0 DNS	DNS
DNF	Juan Chávez; Peru	3716	740; 11.56 s w:3.8	635; 6.22 m w:1.5	600; 11.90 m	560; 1.72 m	676; 53.14 s	0 DNF	505; 32.05 m	0 DNS	0 DNS	DNS
–	Damian Warner; London Western Track and Field Club/Canada	3403	992; 10.43 s w:1.1	881; 7.28 m w:1.8	736; 14.12 m	794; 1.99 m	0 DNS	DNS				
DNF	Victor de Souza Santos; Brazil	3216	823; 11.17 s w:0.6	950; 7.56 m w:2.9	651; 12.74 m	794; 1.99 m	0 DNS	DNS				
–	Wyatt Eyford; Winnipeg Optimist Athletic Club/Canada	2572	725; 11.63 s w:0.6	736; 6.67 m w:0.2	526; 10.67 m	585; 1.75 m	0 DNS	DNS				
–	Michael Rabbitt; Cornell University/United States	2009	827; 11.15 s w:1.1	684; 6.44 m w:-0.5	498; 10.20 m	0 DNS	DNS					
–	Ryan Croy; Winnipeg Optimist Athletic Club/Canada	721	721; 11.65 s w:1.1	0 DNS	0 DNS	0 DNS	DNS					
–	Junior Solomon; Project Athletics Track & Field/Canada	663	663; 11.94 s w:0.9	0 NM	0 DNS	0 DNS	DNS					
–	Branden Wilhelm; University of Windsor/Canada	558	558; 12.49 s w:3.8	0 DNS	0 DNS	0 DNS	DNS					
–	Massar Justin; University of Windsor/Canada	0	0 DNS	0 DNS	0 DNS	0 DNS	DNS					
–	Peter Nsaka Malonge; University of Windsor/Canada	0	0 DNS	0 DNS	0 DNS	0 DNS	DNS					

=== Women's Heptathlon Senior ===
Key

The highest mark recorded in each event is highlighted in yellow

Rank	Athlete	Overall points	100 m H	HJ	SP	200 m	LJ	JT	800 m
–	Jillian Drouin; Sarnia Athletics Southwest TFC/Canada	5972	1004; 13.82 s w:1.2	1067; 1.87 m	717; 12.85 m	863; 25.26 s w:1.9	798; 5.83 m w:1.8	714; 42.44 m	809; 2:21.09 min
1st place, gold medalist(s)	Natasha Jackson; Canada	5928	1060; 13.43 s w:2.5	991; 1.81 m	596; 11.01 m	946; 24.36 s w:2.0	877; 6.09 m w:2.3	539; 33.30 m	919; 2:13.15 min
2nd place, silver medalist(s)	Lindsay Schwartz; United States	5835	988; 13.93 s w:2.5	842; 1.69 m	671; 12.15 m	954; 24.28 s w:2.0	819; 5.90 m w:1.9	667; 40.01 m	894; 2:14.91 min
3rd place, bronze medalist(s)	Rachael McIntosh; Canada	5763	939; 14.28 s w:1.2	806; 1.66 m	694; 12.49 m	909; 24.76 s w:2.0	774; 5.75 m w:1.5	728; 43.14 m	913; 2:13.54 min
4	Lindsay Lettow; United States	5715	1011; 13.77 s w:2.5	842; 1.69 m	664; 12.04 m	890; 24.97 s w:2.0	813; 5.88 m w:1.0	611; 37.04 m	884; 2:15.62 min
5	Deanna Latham; United States	5668	1058; 13.45 s w:2.5	736; 1.60 m	641; 11.69 m	914; 24.71 s w:2.0	850; 6.00 m w:1.8	672; 40.23 m	797; 2:21.99 min
6	Yusleidys Mendieta; Cuba	5626	1011; 13.77 s w:1.2	879; 1.72 m	788; 13.91 m	945; 24.37 s w:2.0	715; 5.55 m w:0.7	747; 44.17 m	541; 2:42.85 min
7	Ana Camila Pirelli; Paraguay	5548	981; 13.98 s w:2.5	736; 1.60 m	723; 12.94 m	873; 25.15 s w:1.9	654; 5.34 m w:2.4	744; 44.00 m	837; 2:19.04 min
8	Nicole Oudenaarden; Canada	5531	843; 14.99 s w:2.2	736; 1.60 m	722; 12.92 m	859; 25.30 s w:1.9	771; 5.74 m w:1.2	820; 47.94 m	780; 2:23.26 min
9	Yilian Durruthy; Cuba	5495	978; 14.00 s w:2.5	806; 1.66 m	789; 13.93 m	971; 24.10 s w:2.0	735; 5.62 m w:0.9	559; 34.34 m	657; 2:32.92 min
–	Rachel Machin; University of Calgary Athletics Club/Canada	5372	943; 14.25 s w:1.2	1029; 1.84 m	640; 11.68 m	755; 26.49 s w:2.4	756; 5.69 m w:1.7	561; 34.45 m	688; 2:30.36 min
10	Jessamyn Sauceda; Mexico	5294	950; 14.20 s w:1.2	842; 1.69 m	558; 10.44 m	854; 25.36 s w:1.9	747; 5.66 m w:1.3	559; 34.35 m	784; 2:22.96 min
–	Jenna Mann; Saskatoon TF Club/Canada	5245	1017; 13.73 s w:2.5	771; 1.63 m	562; 10.50 m	888; 24.99 s w:1.9	683; 5.44 m w:1.2	536; 33.15 m	788; 2:22.63 min
–	Amber Metoyer; USATF/United States	5234	844; 14.98 s w:0.3	842; 1.69 m	756; 13.43 m	809; 25.87 s w:1.9	645; 5.31 m w:1.7	662; 39.71 m	676; 2:31.34 min
11	Giovana Cavaletti; Brazil	5190	939; 14.28 s w:0.3	771; 1.63 m	664; 12.05 m	883; 25.04 s w:2.4	717; 5.56 m w:1.5	515; 32.02 m	701; 2:29.34 min
–	Alana Battiston; Saint-Laurent Sélect/Canada	5162	839; 15.02 s w:0.3	771; 1.63 m	597; 11.03 m	762; 26.41 s w:2.4	640; 5.29 m w:1.3	675; 40.39 m	878; 2:16.04 min
–	Leanna Carriere; Running Room Athletic Club/Canada	5006	840; 15.01 s w:2.2	701; 1.57 m	609; 11.21 m	805; 25.91 s w:2.4	753; 5.68 m w:2.3	558; 34.27 m	740; 2:26.31 min
12	Karla Schleske; Mexico	4867	851; 14.93 s w:2.2	806; 1.66 m	625; 11.45 m	704; 27.10 s w:2.4	603; 5.16 m w:1.5	566; 34.73 m	712; 2:28.47 min
13	Melissa Arana; Peru	4776	822; 15.15 s w:2.2	701; 1.57 m	601; 11.09 m	752; 26.52 s w:2.4	631; 5.26 m w:1.3	464; 29.33 m	805; 2:21.38 min
–	Lauren Taylor; Unattached/Canada	4771	818; 15.18 s w:2.2	879; 1.72 m	501; 9.57 m	713; 26.98 s w:2.4	645; 5.31 m w:2.8	504; 31.45 m	711; 2:28.60 min
–	Michele Krech; Ottawa Lions Track and Field Club/Canada	4767	868; 14.80 s w:0.3	632; 1.51 m	536; 10.10 m	771; 26.30 s w:2.4	595; 5.13 m w:1.1	424; 27.20 m	941; 2:11.65 min
–	Zarria Storm; London Western Track and Field Club/Canada	4647	844; 14.98 s w:0.3	771; 1.63 m	556; 10.40 m	745; 26.61 s w:2.4	581; 5.08 m w:2.0	448; 28.49 m	702; 2:29.26 min
–	Chantel Pilon; Waterloo Track Club/Canada	4509	713; 16.01 s w:2.2	632; 1.51 m	581; 10.78 m	768; 26.34 s w:2.4	530; 4.89 m w:2.3	452; 28.68 m	833; 2:19.33 min
DNF	Tamara Alexandrino de Sousa; Brazil	4458	991; 13.91 s w:1.2	991; 1.81 m	773; 13.68 m	911; 24.74 s w:1.9	792; 5.81 m w:0.1	0 DNS	DNS
–	Karen Lopes; Powerade Brazil/Brazil	4060	912; 14.48 s w:1.2	632; 1.51 m	538; 10.13 m	817; 25.78 s w:2.4	546; 4.95 m w:1.5	615; 37.26 m	0 DNS
–	Maddie Buttinger; University of Toronto/Canada	3211	858; 14.88 s w:0.3	879; 1.72 m	712; 12.77 m	762; 26.41 s w:2.4	0 DNS	0 DNS	DNS
–	Brooke Rowland; York University Track and Field Club/Canada	1771	855; 14.90 s w:0.3	916; 1.75 m	0 NM	0 DNS	DNS		

=== Men's Decathlon Junior ===
Key

The highest mark recorded in each event is highlighted in yellow

Rank	Athlete	Overall points	100 m	LJ	SP	HJ	400 m	110 m H	DT	PV	JT	1500 m
1st place, gold medalist(s)	Steele Wasik; United States	7004	830; 11.14 s w:0.5	753; 6.74 m w:2.3	687; 13.33 m	794; 1.99 m	785; 50.65 s	944; 14.24 s w:1.5	579; 35.74 m	457; 3.40 m	589; 50.06 m	586; 4:55.48 min
2nd place, silver medalist(s)	Hellerson Pereira da Costa; Brazil	6853	804; 11.26 s w:1.0	693; 6.48 m w:1.5	703; 13.59 m	661; 1.84 m	709; 52.37 s	868; 14.85 s w:1.5	623; 37.93 m	731; 4.40 m	529; 45.95 m	532; 5:04.87 min
3rd place, bronze medalist(s)	Vincent Lanctôt-Reeves; Canada	6647	845; 11.07 s w:0.5	739; 6.68 m w:2.2	575; 11.48 m	661; 1.84 m	778; 50.80 s	858; 14.93 s w:1.8	509; 32.25 m	617; 4.00 m	478; 42.44 m	587; 4:55.34 min
4	Vinicius de Souza Fontenele; Brazil	6505	810; 11.23 s w:0.5	790; 6.90 m w:1.9	614; 12.13 m	585; 1.75 m	756; 51.30 s	814; 15.30 s w:1.5	441; 28.80 m	509; 3.60 m	546; 47.13 m	640; 4:46.43 min
5	Jonah Elbaz; Canada	6227	736; 11.58 s w:0.5	604; 6.08 m w:0.4	661; 12.89 m	512; 1.66 m	721; 52.09 s	724; 16.08 s w:1.8	678; 40.65 m	535; 3.70 m	537; 46.49 m	519; 5:07.25 min
–	Cale Hernandez; Powell River T&F Club/Canada	6140	723; 11.64 s w:1.0	610; 6.11 m w:2.6	600; 11.89 m	585; 1.75 m	715; 52.23 s	760; 15.76 s w:1.8	679; 40.70 m	431; 3.30 m	413; 38.01 m	624; 4:49.05 min
6	Pierce Lepage; Canada	6101	847; 11.06 s w:0.5	729; 6.64 m w:1.9	600; 11.90 m	714; 1.90 m	707; 52.41 s	761; 15.75 s w:1.5	588; 36.19 m	509; 3.60 m	318; 31.36 m	328; 5:45.10 min
7	Eddie Tolentino; Puerto Rico	6014	774; 11.40 s w:0.5	652; 6.30 m w:0.9	524; 10.64 m	610; 1.78 m	737; 51.72 s	841; 15.07 s w:1.5	405; 26.96 m	431; 3.30 m	449; 40.45 m	591; 4:54.70 min
8	Andre Campos; Costa Rica	5377	707; 11.72 s w:1.0	533; 5.75 m w:3.3	531; 10.76 m	636; 1.81 m	629; 54.26 s	586; 17.37 s w:1.8	477; 30.62 m	333; 2.90 m	381; 35.73 m	564; 4:59.19 min
DNF	Orlan Rivero; Cuba	5186	723; 11.64 s w:1.0	702; 6.52 m w:1.4	693; 13.43 m	878; 2.08 m	720; 52.11 s	868; 14.85 s w:1.5	602; 36.91 m	0 DNS	0 DNS	0 DNS
–	Austin Ost; University of Calgary Athletics Club/Canada	4348	697; 11.77 s w:1.0	650; 6.29 m w:1.1	579; 11.54 m	661; 1.84 m	0 DNF	754; 15.81 s w:1.8	498; 31.72 m	509; 3.60 m	0 DNS	0 DNS
–	Rostam Turner; Okanagan Athletics Club/Canada	1404	748; 11.52 s w:1.0	0 NM	656; 12.82 m	0 DNS	0 DNS	0 DNS	0 DNS	0 DNS	DNS	

=== Women's Heptathlon Junior ===
Key

The highest mark recorded in each event is highlighted in yellow

Rank	Athlete	Overall points	100 m H	HJ	SP	200 m	LJ	JT	800 m
1st place, gold medalist(s)	Genevieve Gagné; Canada	5028	823; 15.14 s w:1.3	842; 1.69 m	524; 9.92 m	792; 26.06 s w:1.8	697; 5.49 m w:-0.4	593; 36.11 m	757; 2:25.00 min
2nd place, silver medalist(s)	Lais da Silva Pereira; Brazil	4886	823; 15.14 s w:1.3	771; 1.63 m	425; 8.39 m	892; 24.94 s w:1.8	674; 5.41 m w:0.9	473; 29.81 m	828; 2:19.66 min
–	Katelyn Lehner; Unattached/Canada	4879	914; 14.46 s w:1.3	771; 1.63 m	468; 9.06 m	843; 25.48 s w:1.8	674; 5.41 m w:1.2	408; 26.35 m	801; 2:21.65 min
–	Keely Watts-Watling; Okanagan A.C./Canada	4853	897; 14.59 s w:2.6	736; 1.60 m	537; 10.12 m	721; 26.89 s w:1.5	640; 5.29 m w:1.4	562; 34.50 m	760; 2:24.77 min
3rd place, bronze medalist(s)	Allison Frantz; Canada	4718	884; 14.68 s w:1.3	771; 1.63 m	492; 9.42 m	797; 26.00 s w:1.8	717; 5.56 m w:3.2	349; 23.20 m	708; 2:28.83 min
4	Kimberly Cardoza; Peru	4628	764; 15.60 s w:2.6	701; 1.57 m	552; 10.35 m	761; 26.42 s w:1.8	567; 5.03 m w:2.5	494; 30.90 m	789; 2:22.59 min
–	Bridget Deveau; Chebucto Athletics/Canada	4469	767; 15.58 s w:2.6	632; 1.51 m	522; 9.89 m	676; 27.43 s w:1.5	492; 4.75 m w:1.7	627; 37.91 m	753; 2:25.30 min
–	Maude Léveillé; Adrénaline/Canada	4387	825; 15.13 s w:2.6	666; 1.54 m	467; 9.05 m	791; 26.07 s w:1.8	511; 4.82 m w:2.7	427; 27.37 m	700; 2:29.47 min
–	Dallyssa Huggins; Unattached/Canada	4229	740; 15.79 s w:2.6	771; 1.63 m	516; 9.80 m	769; 26.32 s w:1.8	535; 4.91 m w:1.0	0 NM	898; 2:14.63 min
–	Pascale Tardif; Dynamique Laval/Canada	3610	456; 18.32 s w:1.1	534; 1.42 m	441; 8.64 m	607; 28.30 s w:1.5	524; 4.87 m w:1.0	370; 24.34 m	678; 2:31.21 m
–	Bridget Hayes; Ottawa Lions Track and Field Club/Canada	3516	750; 15.71 s w:2.6	0 NH	385; 7.78 m	725; 26.84 s w:1.5	464; 4.64 m w:0.2	313; 21.29 m	879; 2:15.98 min
–	Claudia Gagnon; C.A. Univ. Laval/Canada	2747	312; 19.88 s w:1.1	566; 1.45 m	453; 8.83 m	0 DQ w:1.5	338; 4.13 m w:-1.1	477; 30.03 m	601; 2:37.60 min
DNF	Betsy Gardnes; Cuba	52	52; 24.13 s w:1.3	0 DNS	0 DNS	DNS			

== Medal table ==
* Host nation (Canada)

Rank	Nation	Gold	Silver	Bronze	Total
1	Canada*	2	0	4	6
2	Cuba	1	1	0	2
2	United States	1	1	0	2
4	Brazil	0	2	0	2
Totals (4 entries)		4	4	4	12

== Participation ==
An unofficial count yields the participation of 41 athletes (plus 48 guests and locals) from 10 countries.

- Brazil (6 + 2 guests)
- Canada (11 + 40 guests)
- Costa Rica (1)
- Cuba (7)
- Dominican Republic (2)
- Mexico (2 + 2 guests)
- Paraguay (1)
- Peru (3)
- Puerto Rico (1)
- United States (7 + 4 guests)

== See also ==
- 2014 in athletics (track and field)
