= André Campos =

Brazilian water polo player

Personal information
- Born: 21 November 1960 (age 64); Rio de Janeiro, Brazil

Sport
- Sport: Water polo

André Campos (born 21 November 1960) is a Brazilian water polo player. He competed in the men's tournament at the 1984 Summer Olympics.
