= Hank Palmer =

Canadian sprinter (born 1985)

Hank Palmer (born 16 March 1985) is a Canadian sprinter. He was born in Montreal. Palmer's best place to date was a fourth place at the 2004 World Junior Championships. He is uncommonly known by his self-appointed nicknames Black Phoenix and Legend.

Palmer represented Canada at the 2008 Summer Olympics in Beijing. He competed at the 4 × 100 metres relay together with Pierre Browne, Anson Henry, and Jared Connaughton. In their qualification heat they placed second behind Jamaica, but in front of Germany and China. Their time of 38.77 was the fourth out of sixteen participating nations in the first round and they qualified for the final. There they sprinted to a time of 38.66 seconds, which was the sixth time.
