= Jacqueline Murekatete =

Jacqueline Murekatete is a human rights activist, and founder of the NGO Genocide Survivors Foundation. Aged nine Murekatete lost the majority of her family during the Rwandan genocide against the Tutsi, she was granted asylum in 1995 in the US, where she was brought up by her uncle. Murekatete began to tell her story after David Gewirtzman, a survivor of The Holocaust, spoke of his experiences at her school.

Murekatete's nonprofit, Genocide Survivors Foundation educates people about Genocide and other mass atrocity crimes, and raises funds to support genocide survivors.

Murekatete was honoured by New York University in 2011 with the Distinguished Young Alumna Award, and she was one of the grant recipients and award winner of the 2010 VH1 Do Something Awards. She is also a recipient of the Global Peace and Tolerance Award from the United Nations.

== Bibliography ==
- Birkner, Gabrielle (4 April 2005). "David Gewirtzman United By Horror". The Jewish Week. Archived from the original on 4 March 2016.
- Brown, Jeffrey (9 April 2004). "Remembering the Past". PBS. Archived from the original on 23 December 2013.
- "Meet Do Something Award Winner Jacqueline Murekatete". Do Something. 2010. Archived from the original on 7 October 2013.
- Huang, Nancy (18 April 2012). "Jacqueline Murekatete, 27". Time Out.
- "Jacqueline Murekatete (CAS '07) chosen for Distinguished Young Alumna Award". New York University. 10 October 2011.
- Sambira, Jocelyne (5 April 2013). "Rwanda genocide survivors struggle to rebuild their lives". Africa Renewal.
- Salamone, Gina (18 July 2010). "Jacqueline Murekatete, survivor of 1994 Rwandan Genocide, to be honored for activism by VH1". New York Daily News. Archived from the original on March 6, 2016.
- Singer, Alan J. (2008). Social Studies for Secondary Schools: Teaching to Learn, Learning to Teach (3rd ed.). Routledge. ISBN 978-0805864465.
- Urban Walker, Margaret (2006). Moral Repair: Reconstructing Moral Relations After Wrongdoing. Cambridge University Press. ISBN 978-0521009256.
