= Fanjanteino Félix =

French middle-distance runner (born 1980)

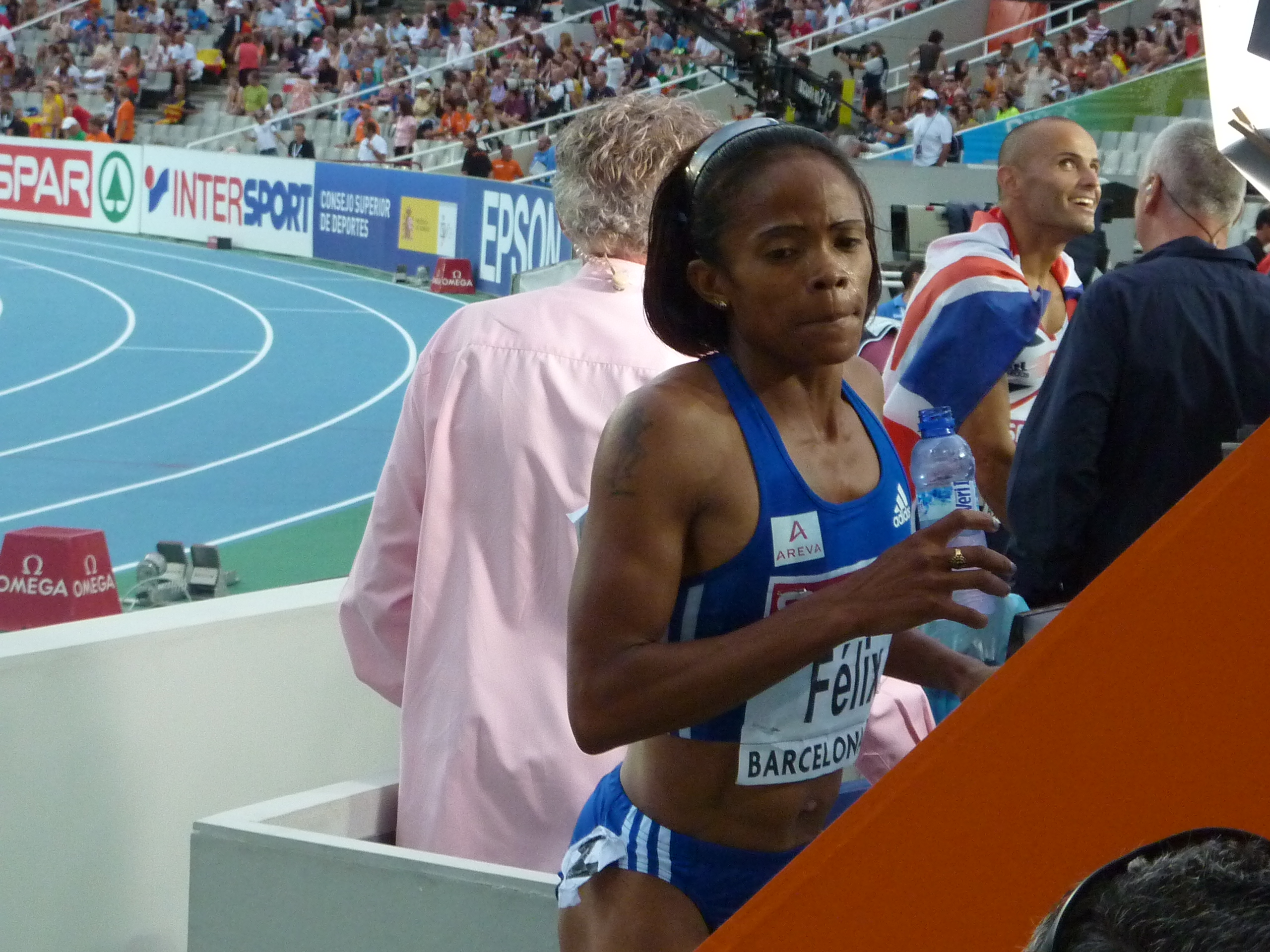
- Félix at the 2010 European Championships

Personal information
- Nationality: French
- Born: 26 January 1980 (age 45) Antanimena, Madagascar
- Years active: 2009-2013
- Height: 1.54 m (5 ft 1 in)
- Weight: 45 kg (99 lb)

Sport
- Event(s): 800 m, 1 500 m
- Club: Stade sottevillais 76
- Coached by: Christian Feuillepain

Fanjanteino Félix (née Rakotomalala; born 26 January 1980) is a French middle distance runner. She originally competed for Madagascar and remains the country's national indoor record holder over 800 metres and 1500 metres. She competed in the heats of the 800 m at the 2008 IAAF World Indoor Championships. She was seventh in the 1500 m at the 2009 Mediterranean Games, and just missed out on a medal at the 2009 Jeux de la Francophonie taking fourth in the 800 m.

She set a personal best over 800 m at the Notturna di Milano meeting in September 2010, where she finished third in a time of 2:00.18 minutes.

Winner of the Indoor National 800m and 1500m Championships in 2010, she was selected for France to attend the 2010 World Indoor Championships.

== Achievements ==
Year	Competition	Venue	Position	Event	Notes
Representing France
2009	Mediterranean Games	Pescara, Italy	7th	1500 m	4:15.96
2009	Jeux de la Francophonie	Beirut, Lebanon	4th	800 m	2:03.49
2009	Jeux de la Francophonie	Beirut, Lebanon	4th	4 × 400 m relay	3:39.09
2010	World Indoor Championships	Doha, Qatar	10th (h)	1500 m	4:14.62
2010	European Championships	Barcelona, Spain	8th	1500 m	4:04.16
2011	European Indoor Championships	Paris, France	16th (h)	1500 m	4:13.31

=== National ===
- French Athletic Championships :
  - winner of 800 m in 2008, of 1,500 m in 2010. winner of 1,500 m Indoors in 2010.

=== Personal Bests ===
Event	Performance	Location	Date
800 m (Indoors)	2 min 04 s 48	Bordeaux	29 January 2011
800 m (Outdoors)	2 min 00 s 18	Milan	9 September 2010
1,500 m (Indoors)	4 min 08 s 76	Stuttgart	5 February 2011
1,500 m (Outdoors)	4 min 01 s 17	Paris	16 July 2010
