= Leanna Carriere-Wellwood =

Canadian pole vaulter and heptathlete (born 1985)

Medal record

Women's athletics

Representing Canada

Jeux de la Francophonie
Bronze medal – third place	2009 Beirut	Pole vault

Leanna Carriere (born 3 April 1985) is a Canadian pole vaulter and heptathlete.

At the 2009 Francophonie Games she won the bronze medal with a personal best of 4.10 m (13 ft 5 1/4 in).

After suffering a shoulder injury she turned to the heptathlon instead and placed seventeenth at the 2014 Pan American Combined Events Cup with a total of 5006 points – a new personal best.

In June 2014, Carriere-Wellwood scored 6846 points at a women's decathlon in Burlington, Vermont to set a Canadian record in the event.

She has a personal best of 4.22 m (13 ft 10 in) in the pole vault, set in 2015.
