= Anis Selmouni =

Moroccan middle-distance runner

Anis Selmouni (born 15 of March 1979) is a Moroccan athlete, specialist middle distance.

He won the 5000m gold medal at the 2009 Mediterranean Games.

== Achievements ==
Year	Competition	Venue	Position	Event	Notes
Representing Morocco
2003	World Indoor Championships	Birmingham, United Kingdom	11th (h)	1500 m	3:41.99
2007	World Cross Country Championships	Mombasa, Kenya	14th	Senior race	Individual
2007	World Cross Country Championships	Mombasa, Kenya	2nd	Senior race	Team
2008	Olympic Games	Beijing, China	12th (h)	5000 m	13:55.98
2009	Mediterranean Games	Pescara, Italy	1st	5000 m	13:55.98
2009	World Championships	Berlin, Germany	14th	5000 m	13:44.59
2009	Jeux de la Francophonie	Beirut, Lebanon	2nd	5000 m	13:43.73
2009	Jeux de la Francophonie	Beirut, Lebanon	2nd	10,000 m	29:39.07

== Personal bests ==
- 1500 metres - 3:35.35 min (2003)
- Mile - 3:52.66 min (2003)
- 3000 metres - 7:47.68 min (2006)
