= Levente Bartha =

Romanian bobsledder

Personal information
- Full name: Levente Andrei Bartha
- Nationality: Romanian
- Born: 8 March 1977 (age 48)
- Height: 1.90 m (6 ft 3 in)
- Weight: 99 kg (218 lb)

Sport
- Sport: Bobsleigh, Athletics
- Event(s): Two-man, javelin throw

Levente Andrei Bartha (born 8 March 1977) is a Romanian former bobsledder and javelin thrower. He competed in the 2006 and 2018 Winter Olympics.

In the javelin, he won gold at the 2007 Military World Games, a bronze medal at the 2009 Francophonie Games and was a three-time champion at the Balkan Athletics Championships. At national level, he won at least twelve titles at the Romanian Athletics Championships.
