= Sébastien Maillard =

French hurdler

Sébastien Maillard (born 2 May 1981, in Migennes) is a male hurdler from France.

He finished 5th in the 400m hurdles final at the 2006 European Athletics Championships in Gothenburg. He was a semi-finalist in the same event at the 2003 World Championships in Paris. As a junior, he competed in the decathlon.

== Achievements ==
Year	Competition	Venue	Position	Event	Notes
Representing France
1999	European Junior Championships	Riga, Latvia	6th	400 m hurdles	52.55
2000	World Junior Championships	Santiago, Chile	—	Decathlon	DNF
2001	European U23 Championships	Amsterdam, Netherlands	7th	Decathlon	7562 pts
2003	European U23 Championships	Bydgoszcz, Poland	6th	400 m hurdles	50.28
2003	European U23 Championships	Bydgoszcz, Poland	5th	4 × 400 m relay	3:06.79
2003	World Championships	Paris, France	23rd (sf)	400 m hurdles	50.70
2005	Mediterranean Games	Almería, Spain	4th	400 m hurdles	50.71
2006	World Indoor Championships	Moscow, Russia	6th	4 × 400 m relay	3:09.55
2006	European Championships	Gothenburg, Sweden	5th	400 m hurdles	49.54
2009	Mediterranean Games	Pescara, Italy	1st	400 m hurdles	49.80
2009	Jeux de la Francophonie	Beirut, Lebanon	2nd	400 m hurdles	50.35
2009	Jeux de la Francophonie	Beirut, Lebanon	7th	4 × 100 m relay	40.73
2009	Jeux de la Francophonie	Beirut, Lebanon	4th	4 × 400 m relay	3:11.43
2010	European Championships	Barcelona, Spain	14th (sf)	400 m hurdles	51.26
