= Abdourahmane Ndour =

Senegalese sprinter

Abdourahmane Ndour (born 18 November 1986) is a Senegalese sprinter who specializes in the 100 and 200 metres.

In the 100 metres he competed at the 2008 African Championships (semi-final) and the 2011 All-Africa Games (heats).

He finished sixth in the 200 metres at the 2009 Jeux de la Francophonie. He competed in the same event at the 2007 All-Africa Games (heats), the 2008 African Championships (semi-final), the 2010 African Championships (semi-final) and the 2011 All-Africa Games (semi-final).

With the Senegalese relay team he won a bronze medal in the 4 x 100 metres relay at the 2009 Jeux de la Francophonie and finished fifth in the 4 x 400 metres relay at the 2010 African Championships.

His personal best times are 10.39 seconds in the 100 metres, achieved in July 2006 in Dakar; and 21.12 seconds in the 200 metres, achieved in October 2009 in Beirut.
