= Aziz Ouhadi =

Moroccan sprinter (born 1984)

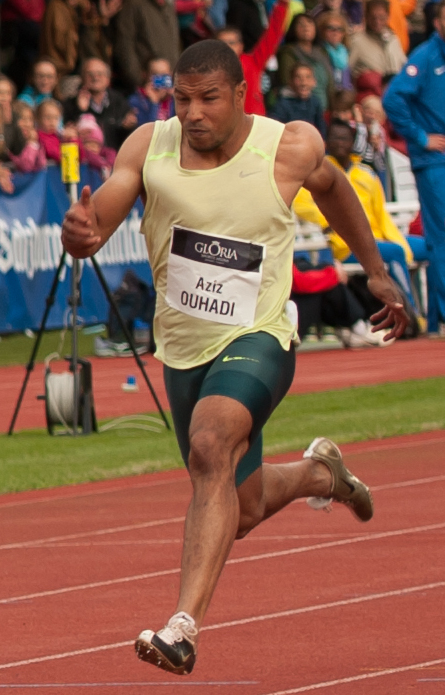
- Ouhadi in 2015

Personal information
- Born: 24 July 1984 (age 41)
- Height: 1.68 m (5 ft 6 in)
- Weight: 72 kg (159 lb)
Medal record
Military World Games
Silver medal – second place	2011 Rio de Janeiro	100 m
Silver medal – second place	2011 Rio de Janeiro	200 m
Pan Arab Games
Gold medal – first place	2011 Doha	200 m
Bronze medal – third place	2011 Doha	100 m

Aziz Ouhadi (Arabic: عزيز أوحادي; born 24 July 1984 in Khemisset) is a Moroccan track and field athlete who competes in the 100 metres and 200 metres. His 100 m personal best of 10.09 seconds is the Moroccan national record. He was part of the Morocco team for the 2012 London Olympics. He represented his country at the 2009 and 2011 World Championships and 2012 World Indoor Championships and has won medals at the Jeux de la Francophonie and the Military World Games.

== Career ==
He won his first national title in the 100 m in 2005. Having run a personal best of 10.25 seconds in Sofia in 2009, he was selected for the Moroccan national squad and came fourth in his heat at the 2009 World Championships in Athletics. At the 2009 Jeux de la Francophonie a month later, he took the silver medal over 100 m behind Ben Youssef Meité. He competed in both the 100 m and 200 m at the 2010 African Championships in Athletics and came sixth and fourth in the respective finals.

In 2011, Ouhadi improved the Moroccan record three times early in the season, culminating in a 10.09-second victory at the Meeting Grand Prix IAAF de Dakar. He won the 100 m at the IAAF Rabat Meeting and headed to Europe, where he won at the Memorial Primo Nebiolo and Josef Odlozil Memorial. He ran in both the sprints at the 2011 Military World Games and won two silver medals, finishing behind Qatar's Femi Ogunode on both occasions. He reached the final of the men's 60 metres at the 2012 World Indoor Championships.

In 2017, he tested positive for SARMs and was banned from competition for four years between 17 April 2017 and 19 May 2021.
