= Linda Marguet =

French middle-distance runner

Personal information
- Nationality: French
- Born: 11 September 1983 (age 42)
- Years active: 2010s

Sport
- Event: 800 m

Linda Marguet (born 11 September 1983) is a French runner who specializes in the 800 metres

== Biography ==
In 2011, she qualified for the European Indoor Championships in Paris-Bercy and placed initially 4th in the final with a run of 2 min 01 s 61, failing by 80 hundredths of a second from third place. But in July 2012, the Russian Yevgeniya Zinurova, who won the race, was stripped of her title for doping. Linda Marguet thus received the bronze medal. In 2013, she was reclassified again, gaining second in the race, following the positive doping test of Iuliia Stepanova. At the French national championships of 2012 Linda won the 800 meter race, running 2:03.79.

== Achievements ==
Year	Competition	Venue	Position	Event	Notes
Representing France
2009	Mediterranean Games	Pescara, Italy	4th	800 m	2:01.73
2009	Jeux de la Francophonie	Beirut, Lebanon	3rd	800 m	2:03.15
2009	Jeux de la Francophonie	Beirut, Lebanon	4th	4 × 400 m relay	3:39.09
2011	European Indoor Championships	Paris, France	2nd	800 m	2:01.61

=== Personal Bests ===
Records personnels
Event		Performance	Location	Date
800 mètres	Outdoors	2 min 01 s 20	Liège	13 July 2010
800 mètres	Indoors	2 min 01 s 32	Paris	5 March 2011
