= Assane Thiam =

Senegalese basketball player

Personal information
- Nationality: Senegalese
- Born: 22 November 1948 (age 76)

Sport
- Sport: Basketball

Assane Thiam (born 22 November 1948) is a Senegalese basketball player. He competed in the men's tournament at the 1972 Summer Olympics.
