= Curtis Moss =

Canadian javelin thrower (born 1987)

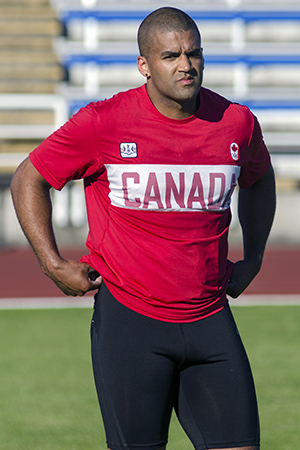

Personal information
- Nationality: Canadian
- Born: April 12, 1987 (age 39) New Westminster, British Columbia, Canada
- Height: 1.83 m (6 ft 0 in)
- Weight: 100 kg (220 lb)

Sport
- Sport: Athletics
- Event: Javelin throw

Achievements and titles
- Personal bests: 81.21, Victoria, 2012

Curtis Moss (born April 12, 1987, in New Westminster, British Columbia) is a Canadian track and field athlete competing in the javelin throw. He competed in the javelin throw event at the 2012 Summer Olympics where he finished 22nd with a throw of 78.22 m. He came in first at the 2012 Canadian National Championships in Calgary, achieving an Olympic "A" Standard. He finished 15th at the 2006 IAAF World Junior Championships in Beijing, China. On May 12, 2012, he set an event record for the javelin throw at the Ponce Grand Prix in Ponce, Puerto Rico, with a distance of 75.32 metres. His personal best is a distance of 81.21 metres, set on June 13, 2012, in Victoria, British Columbia, Canada.

Moss was suspended in 2015 for a banned substance, methylphenidate, detected in June 2015. His proposed sanction ended January 4, 2016.

== Seasonal bests by year ==
- 2003 – 53.21
- 2004 – 57.41
- 2005 – 68.37
- 2006 – 57.77
- 2009 – 78.32
- 2010 – 74.76
- 2011 – 75.53
- 2012 – 81.21
- 2013 – 76.86
