= Kévin Hautcœur =

French middle-distance runner

Kévin Hautcœur (born 17 January 1985) is a French runner who specializes in the 800 metres.

He was born in Nantes. He finished fourth at the 2004 World Junior Championships, and won the gold medal at the 2005 European U23 Championships. He competed at the 2010 World Indoor Championships without reaching the final.

His personal best time is 1:46.29 minutes, achieved in June 2011 in Tomblaine.
