= Sandrine Champion =

French high jumper

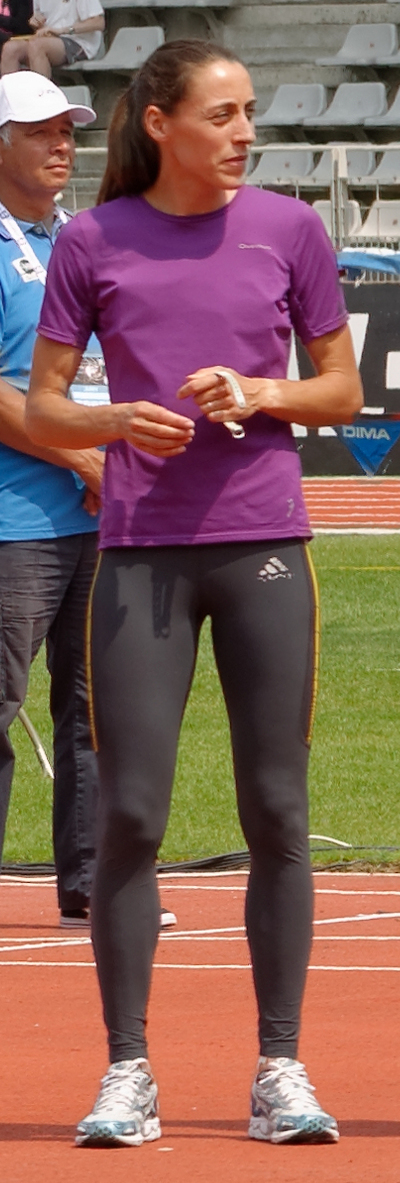
- Champion in 2013

Personal information
- Born: 29 August 1980 (age 46) Saint-Quentin, Aisne, France
- Height: 1.72 m (5 ft 8 in)
- Weight: 58 kg (128 lb)

Sport
- Country: France
- Sport: Athletics (track and field)
- Event: High jump
- Club: Amiens UC
Medal record
Jeux de la Francophonie
Gold medal – first place	2009 Beirut	High jump

Sandrine Champion (born 29 August 1980 at Saint-Quentin) is a French athlete, who specializes in the high jump.

== Biography ==
She won two French championship titles in the high jump: one in Outdoors in 2015 and one Indoors in 2008.

In 2009, she won the gold medal in the High Jump at the Francophone Games at Beirut with a leap of 1.84 m.

Her personal best, established in 2009 in Angers, is 1.86 m.

=== Prize list ===
- French Championships in Athletics:
  - winner of the high jump in 2015; 2nd in 2009 and 2013; 3rd in 2010 and 2011.
- French Indoors Athletics Championships:
  - winner of the high jump in 2008

=== Records ===
Personal records
Event	Performance	Location	Date
High jump	1.86 m	Angers	25 July 2009
