= Christine Guinaudeau =

French racewalker

Personal information
- Nationality: French
- Born: 20 June 1978 (age 47) Cholet
- Years active: 2000s
- Height: 1.62 m (5 ft 4 in)

Sport
- Event: race walking

Christine Guinaudeau (born 20 June 1978 at Cholet) is a French athlete, who specializes in race walking.

== Biography ==
She won eight champion of France walking titles. On the road, for the 10 km walk in 2010 and two for the 20 km walk in 2005 and 2009. She also won five Indoor French national titles for the 3,000 m walk.

She is the current holder of the France record for the 20 000 m walk (on track) walking 1:34.57, on 26 April 2009 at La Londe-les-Maures.

=== Prize list ===
- French Championships in Athletics :
  - winner of the 10 km walk in 2010
  - winner of the 20 km walk in 2005 and 2009
- French Indoor Athletics Championships:
  - winner of 3000 m walk in 2006, 2007, 2008, 2009 and 2010

=== Records ===
Personal Bests
Event	Performance	Location	Date
20 km walk (on road)	1:35.49	Dublin	26 June 2005
20 000 m walk (on track)	1:34.57	La Londe-les-Maures	26 April 2009
