= Vanessa Gladone =

French athlete (born 1982)

Personal information
- Nationality: France
- Born: 3 June 1982 (age 44) Schœlcher

Sport
- Events: Triple Jump, Long Jump

Vanessa Gladone (born 3 June 1982 in Schœlcher) is a former French athlete, who specialized in the triple jump and Long jump.

== Biography ==
In 2009, she won French national championships in the triple jump and Long jump.

She was also an accomplished High Jump athlete with a best of 1.83m in 2009 and her best performance in the Heptathlon was 5622 points

Retired from track since 2012, she now hosts on TV.

=== prize list ===
- French Championships in Athletics :
  - winner of the triple jump 2009
  - winner of the long jump 2009
- French Indoors Athletics Championships:
  - winner of the long jump 2010

=== Records ===
personal records
Event	Performance	Location	Date
Long jump	6.59 m	Reims	July 14, 2009
Triple jump	14.13 m	Angers	July 23, 2009
