= Athletics at the 2015 African Games – Men's 200 metres =

The men's 200 metres event at the 2015 African Games was held on 16 and 17 September.

== Medalists ==
Gold	Silver	Bronze
Hua Wilfried Koffi; Ivory Coast	Divine Oduduru; Nigeria	Odele Tega; Nigeria

== Results ==
=== Heats ===
Qualification: First 3 in each heat (Q) and the next 3 fastest (q) advanced to the semifinals.

Wind:
Heat 1: -0.1 m/s, Heat 2: -0.6 m/s, Heat 3: +0.2 m/s, Heat 4: +0.8 m/s, Heat 5: -0.3 m/s, Heat 6: +0.8 m/s, Heat 7: +0.4 m/s

Rank	Heat	Name	Nationality	Time	Notes
1	6	Tega Odele	Nigeria	20.45	Q
2	5	Divine Oduduru	Nigeria	20.56	Q
3	4	Obinna Metu	Nigeria	20.72	Q
4	2	Idrissa Adam	Cameroon	20.97	Q
5	4	Roscoe Engel	South Africa	21.00	Q
6	5	Jesse Urikhob	Namibia	21.01	Q
7	6	Adama Jammeh	Gambia	21.06	Q
8	2	Shepard Agbeko	Ghana	21.08	Q, SB
9	1	Sydney Siame	Zambia	21.09	Q
9	2	Sibusiso Matsenjwa	Swaziland	21.09	Q
11	7	Hua Wilfried Koffi	Ivory Coast	21.11	Q
12	3	Jonathan Permal	Mauritius	21.12	Q
13	5	Peter Mwai	Kenya	21.13	Q
14	7	Hitjivirue Kaanjuka	Namibia	21.19	Q
15	5	Abodoulie Assim	Gambia	21.26	q
16	1	Ali Khamis Gulam	Tanzania	21.27	Q, NR
17	5	Pako Seribe	Botswana	21.34	q
17	6	Mahamat Goubaye Youssouf	Chad	21.34	Q, SB
19	5	Mlandvo Shongwe	Swaziland	21.36	q
20	4	Tony Chirchir	Kenya	21.37	Q
20	7	Gilles Anthony Afoumba	Republic of the Congo	21.37	Q, SB
22	7	Gérard Kobéané	Burkina Faso	21.39	
23	1	Even Tjiviju	Namibia	21.41	Q
24	4	Chidamba Hazemba	Zambia	21.47	
25	6	Katim Touré	Senegal	21.55	
26	2	Yendoutien Tiebekabe	Togo	21.56	
27	3	Hurel Tchan Bi Chan	Ivory Coast	21.56	Q
28	6	Bienvenu Sawadogo	Burkina Faso	21.57	SB
29	1	Jonathan Bardottier	Mauritius	21.60	
30	3	Leeroy Henriette	Seychelles	21.65	Q
31	7	Kwadjo Acheampong	Ghana	21.70	
32	1	Yateya Kambepera	Botswana	21.74	
33	4	Rodwell Ndhlovu	Zimbabwe	21.81	
34	3	Fikru Abu	Ethiopia	21.95	
35	4	Moustapha Traoré	Senegal	21.97	
36	5	Dorian Obba	Republic of the Congo	22.07	SB
37	1	Hugues Tshiyinga Mafo	DR Congo	22.11	
38	6	Henok Beranu	Ethiopia	22.34	
39	2	Kasongo Mpingo	DR Congo	22.37	
40	5	Jean Thierry Ferdinand	Mauritius	22.43	
41	7	Mohamed Lamine Dansoko	Guinea	22.64	SB
42	2	Edmilson Lima	São Tomé and Príncipe	22.90	SB
43	1	Osman Tahir	Eritrea	23.01	
44	3	Juan Carlos Eraul Loeri	Equatorial Guinea	23.57	
	2	Kenneth Chibwana	Zimbabwe	DQ	R162.8
	7	Abdulsetar Kemal	Ethiopia	DQ	R162.8
	7	Felipe Chainite	Mozambique	DQ	R162.8
	1	Florentin Pombo	Central African Republic	DNS	
	2	Sakaria Kambemka	Botswana	DNS	
	3	Solomon Afful	Ghana	DNS	
	3	Bockarie Sesay	Sierra Leone	DNS	
	3	Gatkuoth Ruben Yutchol	South Sudan	DNS	
	4	Mosito Lehata	Lesotho	DNS	
	4	Ishmail Kamara	Sierra Leone	DNS	
	4	Christopher Naliali	Ivory Coast	DNS	
	6	Brian Kasinda	Zambia	DNS	
	6	Francis Zimwara	Zimbabwe	DNS	

=== Semifinals ===
Qualification: First 2 in each semifinal (Q) and the next 2 fastest (q) advanced to the final.

Wind:
Heat 1: 0.0 m/s, Heat 2: 0.0 m/s, Heat 3: +0.1 m/s

Rank	Heat	Name	Nationality	Time	Notes
1	2	Divine Oduduru	Nigeria	20.51	Q
2	1	Obinna Metu	Nigeria	20.55	Q
3	1	Adama Jammeh	Gambia	20.83	Q
4	1	Sibusiso Matsenjwa	Swaziland	20.84	q
5	3	Hua Wilfried Koffi	Ivory Coast	20.85	Q
6	2	Sydney Siame	Zambia	20.91	Q
7	1	Idrissa Adam	Cameroon	20.95	q
8	3	Tega Odele	Nigeria	20.98	Q
9	2	Roscoe Engel	South Africa	20.99	
10	3	Jonathan Permal	Mauritius	21.00	
11	3	Hitjivirue Kaanjuka	Namibia	21.00	
12	1	Jesse Urikhob	Namibia	21.05	
13	1	Peter Mwai	Kenya	21.16	
14	3	Gilles Anthony Afoumba	Republic of the Congo	21.26	SB
15	2	Shepard Agbeko	Ghana	21.27	
16	3	Mlandvo Shongwe	Swaziland	21.32	
17	2	Abodoulie Assim	Gambia	21.40	
18	2	Mahamat Goubaye Youssouf	Chad	21.43	
19	3	Ali Khamis Gulam	Tanzania	21.47	
20	2	Even Tjiviju	Namibia	21.56	
21	2	Hurel Tchan Bi Chan	Ivory Coast	21.62	
22	3	Tony Chirchir	Kenya	21.64	
23	1	Leeroy Henriette	Seychelles	21.90	
	1	Pako Seribe	Botswana	DQ	R162.8

=== Final ===
Wind: -1.2 m/s

Rank	Lane	Name	Nationality	Time	Notes
1st place, gold medalist(s)	4	Hua Wilfried Koffi	Ivory Coast	20.42	
2nd place, silver medalist(s)	7	Divine Oduduru	Nigeria	20.45	
3rd place, bronze medalist(s)	8	Tega Odele	Nigeria	20.58	
4	5	Adama Jammeh	Gambia	20.74	
5	6	Obinna Metu	Nigeria	20.74	
6	3	Sibusiso Matsenjwa	Swaziland	20.93	
7	9	Sydney Siame	Zambia	21.21	
8	2	Idrissa Adam	Cameroon	21.26	
