= Kaanjuka =

Kaanjuka is a surname. Notable people with the surname include:

- Bernard Kaanjuka, Namibian football manager
- Hitjivirue Kaanjuka (born 1987), Namibian sprinter
