= Athletics at the 2010 Commonwealth Games – Men's 200 metres =

Men's 200 metres at the Commonwealth Games

The Men's 200 metres at the 2010 Commonwealth Games as part of the athletics programme was held at the Jawaharlal Nehru Stadium on Saturday 9 October and Sunday 10 October 2010.

== Records ==
World Record	19.19	Usain Bolt	JAM	Berlin, Germany	20 August 2009
Games Record	19.97	Frank Fredericks	NAM	Victoria, Canada	1994

== Round 1 ==
First 3 in each heat (Q) and 8 best performers (q) advance to the Round 2.

=== Heat 1 ===
Rank	Lane	Name	Reaction Time	Result	Notes
1	6	Leon Baptiste (ENG)	0.192	21.06	Q
2	4	Jamial Rolle (BAH)	0.192	21.25	Q
3	3	Nelson Stone (PNG)	0.241	21.37	Q
4	8	Richard Richardson (ANT)	0.234	21.37	q, PB
5	5	Jean Milazar (SIN)	0.188	21.46	q
6	2	Hussain Inaas (IND)	0.198	23.06	
–	7	Robert Ibeh (MRI)			DNS

=== Heat 2 ===
Rank	Lane	Name	Reaction Time	Result	Notes
1	7	Aziz Zakari (GHA)	0.185	21.32	Q
2	6	Steve Slowly (JAM)	0.178	21.50	Q
3	3	Bockarie Sesay (SLE)	0.154	22.69	Q
4	8	Saidi Ndayisaba (RWA)	0.186	22.85	
5	2	George Pine (KIR)	0.164	22.95	PB
6	4	Hywel Robinson (GUE)	0.216	22.98	
–	9	Bryan Barnett (CAN)	0.213		DNF
–	5	Chavaughn Walsh (ANT)			DNS

=== Heat 3 ===
Rank	Lane	Name	Reaction Time	Result	Notes
1	2	Jared Connaughton (CAN)	0.187	20.97	Q
2	5	Alli Ngaimoko (UGA)	0.208	21.21	Q
3	6	Louis Coiffic (MRI)	0.166	21.45	Q
4	4	Nana Samm (GHA)	0.193	21.63	q
5	7	Abdoulie Assim (GAM)	0.226	21.91	q
6	3	Neddy Marie (SEY)	0.281	22.68	
–	8	Desroy Findlay (ANG)	0.190	24.41	

=== Heat 4 ===
Rank	Lane	Name	Reaction Time	Result	Notes
1	8	Allah Laryea-Akrong (GHA)	0.190	21.08	Q
2	4	Christian Malcolm (WAL)	0.170	21.14	Q
3	3	Harold Houston (BER)	0.157	21.42	Q
4	2	David Hamil (CAY)	0.186	22.01	q
5	7	Shanoi Richardson (ANG)	0.182	22.96	
–	5	Jack Iroga (SOL)	F^{1}		DSQ
–	6	Delano Williams (TCI)			DNS

=== Heat 5 ===
Rank	Lane	Name	Reaction Time	Result	Notes
1	8	Anderson Mutegi (KEN)	0.365	21.40	Q
2	2	Suwaibou Sanneh (GAM)	0.192	21.48	Q
3	3	Dharambir (IND)	0.213	21.48	Q
4	5	Matt Davies (AUS)	0.179	21.54	q
5	4	John Rivan (PNG)	0.218	22.36	
6	7	Ibrahim Turay (SLE)	0.215	22.54	
7	6	Dylan Ogotau (NIU)	0.267	24.81	

=== Heat 6 ===
Rank	Lane	Name	Reaction Time	Result	Notes
1	3	Marlon Devonish (ENG)	0.166	21.15	Q
2	8	Kipkemoi Soy (KEN)	0.213	21.30	Q
3	4	Idrissa Adam (CMR)	0.215	21.66	Q
4	6	Ahmed Ondimba (MRI)	0.165	21.68	q
5	2	Lester Ryan (MNT)	0.153	22.53	
6	7	Felix Mwango (MAW)	0.199	23.58	
–	9	Xavier Niuia-Tofa (NIU)			DNS

=== Heat 7 ===
Rank	Lane	Name	Reaction Time	Result	Notes
1	5	Rasheed Dwyer (JAM)	0.210	21.23	Q
2	4	Stephen Barasa (KEN)	0.171	21.29	Q, SB
3	2	Antoine Adams (SKN)	0.197	21.72	Q
4	7	Ousman Gibba (GAM)	0.193	22.03	
5	8	Saaid Hassan (MDV)	0.187	22.07	NR
6	3	Adison Alfred (SOL)	0.258	22.84	SB
–	6	Abdul Qureshi (IND)	F^{1}		DSQ

=== Heat 8 ===
Rank	Lane	Name	Reaction Time	Result	Notes
1	6	Mosito Lehata (LES)	0.191	21.02	Q, PB
2	3	Lansford Spence (JAM)	0.275	21.12	Q
3	7	Emmanuel Callender (TRI)	0.186	21.16	Q
4	8	Shehan Abeyptiya (SRI)	0.197	21.17	q, PB
5	4	Shernyl Burns (MNT)	0.183	22.50	
6	2	Chris Walasi (SOL)	0.219	22.81	
7	9	Musa Sandy (SLE)	0.206	23.19	
8	5	Ponifasio Tahamaka (NIU)	0.187	24.40	

== Round 2 ==
First 3 in each heat (Q) and 4 best performers (q) advance to the Semifinals.

=== Heat 1 ===
Rank	Lane	Name	Reaction Time	Result	Notes
1	5	Marlon Devonish (ENG)	0.173	20.90	Q
2	6	Jamial Rolle (BAH)	0.203	21.03	Q
3	2	Shehan Abeyptiya (SRI)	0.218	21.12	Q, PB
4	4	Allah Laryea-Akrong (GHA)	0.192	21.16	q
5	8	Louis Coiffic (MRI)	0.163	21.19	SB
6	9	Dharambir (IND)	0.214	21.20	PB
7	3	Matt Davies (AUS)	0.168	21.42	
8	7	Stephen Barasa (KEN)	0.208	21.50	

=== Heat 2 ===
Rank	Lane	Name	Reaction Time	Result	Notes
1	7	Jared Connaughton (CAN)	0.172	20.60	Q, SB
2	4	Lansford Spence (JAM)	0.200	20.60	Q, PB
3	8	Emmanuel Callender (TRI)	0.171	20.91	Q
4	6	Mosito Lehata (LES)	0.188	20.97	q, PB
5	5	Anderson Mutegi (KEN)	0.252	21.31	
6	3	Nana Samm (GHA)	0.191	21.52	
7	2	Abdoulie Assim (GAM)	0.214	21.90	
8	9	Bockarie Sesay (SLE)	0.178	22.63	

=== Heat 3 ===
Rank	Lane	Name	Reaction Time	Result	Notes
1	4	Christian Malcolm (WAL)	0.177	20.93	Q
2	7	Aziz Zakari (GHA)	0.177	21.00	Q
3	9	Nelson Stone (PNG)	0.201	21.30	Q
4	3	Jean Milazar (SIN)	0.160	21.41	
5	5	Suwaibou Sanneh (GAM)	0.200	21.52	
6	6	Steve Slowly (JAM)	0.173	21.54	
7	8	Antoine Adams (SKN)	0.182	21.69	
8	2	David Hamil (CAY)	0.201	22.32	

=== Heat 4 ===
Rank	Lane	Name	Reaction Time	Result	Notes
1	7	Leon Baptiste (ENG)	0.141	20.68	Q
2	6	Rasheed Dwyer (JAM)	0.181	20.93	Q
3	8	Harold Houston (BER)	0.164	21.06	Q
4	4	Kipkemoi Soy (KEN)	0.197	21.16	q
5	5	Alli Ngaimoko (UGA)	0.196	21.17	q
6	2	Ahmed Ondimba (MRI)	0.182	21.64	
7	3	Richard Richardson (ANT)	0.225	21.65	
8	9	Idrissa Adam (CMR)	0.236	21.69	

== Semifinals ==
First 3 in each heat (Q) and 2 best performers (q) advance to the Final.

=== Semifinal 1 ===
Rank	Lane	Name	Reaction Time	Result	Notes
1	4	Leon Baptiste (ENG)	0.177	20.43	Q, PB
2	6	Christian Malcolm (WAL)	0.203	20.53	Q
3	5	Lansford Spence (JAM)	0.206	20.54	Q, PB
4	9	Emmanuel Callender (TRI)	0.247	21.05	q
5	7	Jamial Rolle (BAH)	0.202	21.17	
6	8	Nelson Stone (PNG)	0.249	21.30	
7	2	Allah Laryea-Akrong (GHA)	0.191	21.45	
8	3	Alli Ngaimoko (UGA)	0.168	21.61	

=== Semifinal 2 ===
Rank	Lane	Name	Reaction Time	Result	Notes
1	6	Jared Connaughton (CAN)	0.161	20.65	Q
2	4	Marlon Devonish (ENG)	0.148	20.70	Q
3	5	Aziz Zakari (GHA)	0.186	21.00	Q
4	3	Mosito Lehata (LES)	0.161	21.05	q
5	7	Rasheed Dwyer (JAM)	0.201	21.13	
6	9	Harold Houston (BER)	0.167	21.25	
7	2	Kipkemoi Soy (KEN)	0.224	21.50	
–	8	Shehan Abeyptiya (SRI)			DNS

== Final ==
Rank	Lane	Name	Reaction Time	Result	Notes
1st place, gold medalist(s)	4	Leon Baptiste (ENG)	0.175	20.45	PB
2nd place, silver medalist(s)	9	Lansford Spence (JAM)	0.201	20.49	PB
3rd place, bronze medalist(s)	6	Christian Malcolm (WAL)	0.190	20.52	
4	7	Jared Connaughton (CAN)	0.156	20.62	
5	5	Marlon Devonish (ENG)	0.152	20.75	
6	8	Aziz Zakari (GHA)	0.184	21.08	
7	2	Emmanuel Callender (TRI)	0.166	21.12	
8	3	Mosito Lehata (LES)	0.185	21.13	
