= Athletics at the 2015 African Games – Men's 100 metres =

Olympic event

The men's 100 metres event at the 2015 African Games was held on 13 and 14 September.

== Medalists ==
Gold	Silver	Bronze
Ben Youssef Meïté; Ivory Coast	Ogho-Oghene Egwero; Nigeria	Hua Wilfried Koffi; Ivory Coast

== Results ==
=== Heats ===
Qualification: First 3 in each heat (Q) and the next 6 fastest (q) advanced to the semifinals.

Wind:
Heat 1: +0.4 m/s, Heat 2: -0.8 m/s, Heat 3: +0.2 m/s, Heat 4: -0.3 m/s, Heat 5: 0.0 m/s, Heat 6: +0.9 m/s

Rank	Heat	Name	Nationality	Time	Notes
1	5	Ben Youssef Meïté	Ivory Coast	10.21	Q
2	4	Ogho-Oghene Egwero	Nigeria	10.25	Q
3	3	Seye Ogunlewe	Nigeria	10.31	Q
3	6	Brian Kasinda	Zambia	10.31	Q
5	5	Nicholas Imhoaperamhe	Nigeria	10.32	Q
6	1	Anaso Jobodwana	South Africa	10.35	Q
6	3	Sydney Siame	Zambia	10.35	Q
6	5	Dantago Gurirab	Namibia	10.35	Q, SB
9	2	Hua Wilfried Koffi	Ivory Coast	10.38	Q
10	1	Mosito Lehata	Lesotho	10.41	Q
10	4	Roscoe Engel	South Africa	10.41	Q
12	3	Hitjivirue Kaanjuka	Namibia	10.42	Q
13	3	Idrissa Adam	Cameroon	10.45	q
14	1	Jesse Urikhob	Namibia	10.46	Q
15	2	Gérard Kobéané	Burkina Faso	10.47	Q
16	4	Sibusiso Matsenjwa	Swaziland	10.48	Q
17	1	Arthur Gué Cissé	Ivory Coast	10.53	q
18	2	Yateya Kambepera	Botswana	10.56	Q
18	2	Jammeh Adama	Gambia	10.56	q
18	4	Mark Otieno	Kenya	10.56	q
21	4	Titus Kafunda	Zambia	10.58	q
22	4	Francis Zimwara	Zimbabwe	10.58	q
23	5	Ebrima Camara	Gambia	10.60	SB
24	5	Mlandvo Shongwe	Swaziland	10.61	
25	3	Katim Touré	Senegal	10.62	
25	6	Gilbert Otieno Osure	Kenya	10.62	Q
27	6	Kenneth Chibwana	Zimbabwe	10.63	Q
28	5	Dorian Celeste Keletela	Republic of the Congo	10.68	
29	6	Ali Khamis Gulam	Tanzania	10.72	
29	4	Yendoutien Tiebekabe	Togo	10.72	
31	4	Fabrice Coiffic	Mauritius	10.73	
32	3	Tony Chirchir	Kenya	10.74	
33	1	Julien Miguel Meuniere	Mauritius	10.76	
34	2	Moulaye Sonko	Senegal	10.77	
34	3	Ishmail Kamara	Sierra Leone	10.77	
36	2	Mahamat Goubaye Youssouf	Chad	10.78	SB
37	5	Sidiki Ouedraogo	Burkina Faso	10.81	
38	1	Musa Isabirje	Uganda	10.84	
39	6	Mohamed Lamine Dansoko	Guinea	10.93	SB
40	6	Jean Tarcisius Batambock	Cameroon	10.96	
41	1	Hugues Tshiyinga Mafo	DR Congo	10.97	
42	2	Vivian Williams	Sierra Leone	10.98	
43	6	Abdulsetar Kemal	Ethiopia	11.05	
44	1	Durel Effeind	Republic of the Congo	11.17	
44	2	Florentin Pombo	Central African Republic	11.17	
46	1	Jidou El Moctar	Mauritania	11.23	
47	2	Samuel Angelico	Eritrea	11.34	
48	6	Edmilson Lima	São Tomé and Príncipe	11.35	
49	4	Juan Carlos Eraul Loeri	Equatorial Guinea	11.78	
	3	Henok Beranu	Ethiopia	DQ	R162.8
	3	Jean Thierie Ferdinand	Mauritius	DQ	R162.8
	5	Kasongo Mpingo	DR Congo	DQ	R162.8
	5	Moustapha Traoré	Mali	DNS	
	6	Leeroy Henriette	Seychelles	DNS	

=== Semifinals ===
Qualification: First 2 in each semifinal (Q) and the next 2 fastest (q) advanced to the final.

Wind:
Heat 1: +0.3 m/s, Heat 2: +0.3 m/s, Heat 3: +0.3 m/s

Rank	Heat	Name	Nationality	Time	Notes
1	2	Ogho-Oghene Egwero	Nigeria	10.06	Q
2	1	Ben Youssef Meïté	Ivory Coast	10.12	Q
3	2	Hua Wilfried Koffi	Ivory Coast	10.14	Q
4	3	Brian Kasinda	Zambia	10.29	Q
5	3	Roscoe Engel	South Africa	10.32	Q
6	3	Seye Ogunlewe	Nigeria	10.35	q
7	3	Mosito Lehata	Lesotho	10.35	q
8	1	Nicholas Imhoaperamhe	Nigeria	10.39	Q
9	1	Dantago Gurirab	Namibia	10.39	
10	3	Jammeh Adama	Gambia	10.40	SB
11	2	Mark Otieno	Kenya	10.41	SB
12	2	Gérard Kobéané	Burkina Faso	10.44	
13	3	Sibusiso Matsenjwa	Swaziland	10.46	
14	1	Titus Kafunda	Zambia	10.49	
14	3	Jesse Urikhob	Namibia	10.49	
16	2	Francis Zimwara	Zimbabwe	10.50	
17	1	Gilbert Otieno Osure	Kenya	10.54	
18	3	Arthur Gué Cissé	Ivory Coast	10.55	
19	1	Idrissa Adam	Cameroon	10.58	
20	2	Yateya Kambepera	Botswana	10.64	
21	1	Kenneth Chibwana	Zimbabwe	10.91	
	2	Hitjivirue Kaanjuka	Namibia	DQ	R162.8
	2	Sydney Siame	Zambia	DQ	R162.8
	1	Anaso Jobodwana	South Africa	DNS	

=== Final ===
Wind: -2.1 m/s

Rank	Lane	Name	Nationality	Time	Notes
1st place, gold medalist(s)	4	Ben Youssef Meïté	Ivory Coast	10.04	NR
2nd place, silver medalist(s)	6	Ogho-Oghene Egwero	Nigeria	10.17	
3rd place, bronze medalist(s)	5	Hua Wilfried Koffi	Ivory Coast	10.23	
4	8	Roscoe Engel	South Africa	10.45	
5	3	Seye Ogunlewe	Nigeria	10.45	
6	7	Brian Kasinda	Zambia	10.47	
7	9	Nicholas Imhoaperamhe	Nigeria	10.52	
8	2	Mosito Lehata	Lesotho	10.56	
