= 2012 African Championships in Athletics – Men's 200 metres =

The men's 200 metres at the 2012 African Championships in Athletics was held at the Stade Charles de Gaulle on 30 June and 1 July.

== Medalists ==
Gold	Ben Youssef Meité; Ivory Coast
Silver	Amr Ibrahim Mostafa Seoud; Egypt
Bronze	Noah Akwu; Nigeria

== Records ==
Standing records prior to the 2012 African Championships in Athletics
World record	Usain Bolt (JAM)	19.19	Berlin, Germany	20 August 2009
African record	Frankie Fredericks (NAM)	19.68	Atlanta, United States	1 August 1996
Championship record	Frankie Fredericks (NAM)	19.99	Dakar, Senegal	22 August 1998

== Schedule ==
Date	Time	Round
30 June 2012	14:00	Round 1
30 June 2012	15:20	Semifinals
1 July 2012	16:10	Final

== Results ==
=== Round 1 ===
First 2 in each heat (Q) and 8 best performers (q) advance to the Semifinals.

Wind:
Heat 1: 0.0 m/s, Heat 2: +0.4 m/s, Heat 3: 0.0 m/s, Heat 4: 0.0 m/s, Heat 5: +0.1 m/s, Heat 6: -0.3 m/s, Heat 7 -0.3 m/s, Heat 8: -0.6 m/s

Rank	Heat	Lane	Name	Nationality	Time	Note
1	7	6	Thuso Mpuang	South Africa	20.95	Q
2	2	5	Noah Akwu	Nigeria	20.98	Q
3	7	3	Adama Jammeh	Gambia	21.04	q
4	3	1	Obakeng Ngwigwa	Botswana	21.07	Q
5	4	1	Idrissa Adam	Cameroon	21.09	Q
6	7	8	Hitjivirue Kaanjuka	Namibia	21.11	q
7	5	7	Amr Ibrahim Mostafa Seoud	Egypt	21.12	Q
8	6	5	Tim Abeyie	Ghana	21.14	Q
8	8	8	Mosito Lehata	Lesotho	21.14	Q
10	1	5	Simon Magakwe	South Africa	21.15	Q
11	6	7	Anaso Jobodwana	South Africa	21.19	Q
12	2	7	Ben Youssef Meité	Ivory Coast	21.20	Q
12	8	1	Shepherd Kofi Agbeko	Ghana	21.20	Q
14	6	8	Titus Kafunda Mukhala	Zambia	21.21	q
15	1	4	Innocent Bologo	Burkina Faso	21.22	Q
16	4	6	Ali Ngaimoko	Uganda	21.31	Q
17	7	2	Fabrice Coiffic	Mauritius	21.32	q
18	8	7	Francis Zimwara	Zimbabwe	21.34	q
19	8	3	Gérard Kobéané	Burkina Faso	21.38	q
20	4	2	Ashhad Agyapong	Ghana	21.42	q
21	3	6	Stanley Azie	Nigeria	21.45	Q
22	2	3	Tony Chirchir	Kenya	21.49	Q
23	5	2	Sibusiso Matsenjwa	Swaziland	21.50	Q
24	2	5	Delivert Arsene Kimbembe	Republic of the Congo	21.64	q
25	3	4	Frank Puriza	Namibia	21.72	
26	2	4	Brian Dzingai	Zimbabwe	21.74	
27	8	6	Jean-Yves Esparon	Seychelles	21.75	
28	2	8	Assim Abdoule	Gambia	21.81	
29	5	1	Adam Yarou	Benin	21.95	
30	4	7	Fanuel Kenosi	Botswana	21.96	
31	5	4	Lingo Obanga Ojulu	Ethiopia	21.98	
32	1	2	Touray Ibrahim	Sierra Leone	22.00	
33	6	3	Yendountien Tiebekabe	Togo	22.02	
34	1	8	Neddy Marie	Seychelles	22.03	
34	3	8	Marvin Lewis	Liberia	22.03	
36	7	4	Leeroy Henriette	Seychelles	22.07	
37	3	7	Isaac Jones	Gambia	22.08	
38	2	2	Abyot Lencho	Ethiopia	22.09	
39	5	5	Thierie Ferdinand	Mauritius	22.25	
40	7	7	Marvini Bonde	Zimbabwe	22.29	
41	4	3	Wetere Galcha	Ethiopia	22.46	
42	6	4	Abdallah Al Bain Abbo	Chad	22.57	
43	6	6	Kassimou Amadou Tidjani	Benin	22.70	
44	3	5	Mahamat Modou Moussa	Chad	22.72	
45	4	5	Christ Bitsindou	Republic of the Congo	22.75	
46	5	3	Narcisse Dingamyo	Chad	22.87	
47	5	8	Saifeldel Ali	Libya	22.90	
48	1	3	Kabeya Mukendi	Democratic Republic of the Congo	23.64	
49	7	1	Reginaldo Montenguba	Equatorial Guinea	24.24	
	3	2	Pierre Paul Bissek	Cameroon	DNF	
	6	2	Mohamed Khouaja	Libya	DNF	
	4	8	Rosel Kafwa Lusanga	Democratic Republic of the Congo	DSQ	
	8	5	Boubavir Tawerghi	Libya	DSQ	
	1	6	Tekle Berhane	Eritrea	DNS	
	1	7	Richard Chitambi	Zambia	DNS	
	2	6	Obinna Metu	Nigeria	DNS	
	3	3	Jiddou Ould Haye	Mauritania	DNS	
	4	4	Siapade Marius Loua	Ivory Coast	DNS	
	5	6	Jean Tarcicius Batambok	Cameroon	DNS	
	8	2	Hua Wilfried Koffi	Ivory Coast	DNS	

=== Semifinals ===
First 2 in each heat (Q) and 2 best performers (q) advance to the Final.

Wind:
Heat 1: -0.2 m/s, Heat 2: -1.2 m/s, Heat 3: -1.0 m/s

Rank	Heat	Lane	Name	Nationality	Time	Note
1	2	5	Ben Youssef Meité	Ivory Coast	20.61	Q
2	3	3	Amr Ibrahim Mostafa Seoud	Egypt	20.62	Q
3	1	5	Mosito Lehata	Lesotho	20.63	Q, NR
4	1	6	Simon Magakwe	South Africa	20.66	Q
5	2	4	Thuso Mpuang	South Africa	20.70	Q
6	3	5	Noah Akwu	Nigeria	20.74	Q
7	3	6	Idrissa Adam	Cameroon	20.78	q
8	1	3	Obakeng Ngwigwa	Botswana	20.83	q
9	2	4	Tim Abeyie	Ghana	20.98	
10	1	7	Adama Jammeh	Gambia	21.02	
11	2	8	Ali Ngaimoko	Uganda	21.07	
12	2	7	Hitjivirue Kaanjuka	Namibia	21.08	
13	2	2	Titus Kafunda Mukhala	Zambia	21.11	
14	2	6	Innocent Bologo	Burkina Faso	21.12	
15	1	4	Shepherd Kofi Agbeko	Ghana	21.20	
16	3	8	Sibusiso Matsenjwa	Swaziland	21.21	
17	3	7	Tony Chirchir	Kenya	21.34	
18	1	2	Fabrice Coiffic	Mauritius	21.38	
18	3	2	Francis Zimwara	Zimbabwe	21.38	
19	1	1	Gérard Kobéané	Burkina Faso	21.52	
21	2	1	Delivert Arsene Kimbembe	Republic of the Congo	21.70	
22	1	8	Stanley Azie	Nigeria	21.83	
	3	1	Ashhad Agyapong	Ghana	DNS	
	3	4	Anaso Jobodwana	South Africa	DNS	

=== Final ===
Wind: -1.4 m/s

Rank	Lane	Name	Nationality	Time	Note
1st place, gold medalist(s)	6	Ben Youssef Meité	Ivory Coast	20.62	
2nd place, silver medalist(s)	4	Amr Ibrahim Mostafa Seoud	Egypt	20.76	
3rd place, bronze medalist(s)	7	Noah Akwu	Nigeria	20.83	
4	5	Simon Magakwe	South Africa	20.87	
5	2	Obakeng Ngwigwa	Botswana	21.01	
6	1	Idrissa Adam	Cameroon	21.09	
7	3	Mosito Lehata	Lesotho	21.11	
8	8	Thuso Mpuang	South Africa	21.39	
