= Athletics at the 2011 All-Africa Games – Men's 100 metres =

The Men's 100 metres at the 2011 All-Africa Games took place on 11–12 September at the Estádio Nacional do Zimpeto.

The final held at 7:10 p.m. local time.

== Medalists ==
| Gold | Amr Ibrahim Mostafa Seoud (EGY) |
| Silver | Ben Youssef Meite (CIV) |
| Bronze | Obinna Metu (NGR) |

== Records ==
Prior to this competition, the existing World, African record and World leading were as follows:

| World record | Usain Bolt (JAM) | 9.58 | Berlin, Germany | 16 August 2009 |
| World Leading | Asafa Powell (JAM) | 9.78 | Lausanne, Switzerland | 30 June 2011 |
| African Record | Olusoji Fasuba (NGA) | 9.85 | Doha, Qatar | 12 May 2006 |

== Schedule ==
| Date | Time | Round |
|---|---|---|
| September 11, 2011 | 10:20 | Heats |
| September 12, 2011 | 17:20 | Semifinals |
| September 12, 2011 | 19:10 | Final |

== Results ==
| KEY: | q | Fastest non-qualifiers | Q | Qualified | NR | National record | PB | Personal best | SB | Seasonal best |

=== Heats ===
Qualification: First 3 in each heat (Q) and the next 3 fastest (q) advance to the semifinals.

Wind:
Heat 1: +0.4 m/s, Heat 2: -0.6 m/s, Heat 3: +2.6 m/s, Heat 4: −0.8 m/s, Heat 5: −0.2 m/s, Heat 6: +0.3 m/s

| Rank | Heat | Name | Nationality | Time | Notes |
|---|---|---|---|---|---|
| 1 | 4 | Idrissa Adam | Cameroon | 10.2 | Q |
| 2 | 6 | Amr Ibrahim Mostafa Seoud | Egypt | 10.2 | Q |
| 3 | 3 | Gérard Kobéané | Burkina Faso | 10.3 | Q |
| 4 | 5 | Obinna Metu | Nigeria | 10.3 | Q |
| 5 | 6 | Peter Emelieze | Nigeria | 10.34 | Q |
| 6 | 1 | Ben Youssef Meité | Ivory Coast | 10.4 | Q |
| 7 | 3 | Gogbeu Francis Koné | Ivory Coast | 10.4 | Q |
| 8 | 3 | Jesse Urikhob | Namibia | 10.4 | Q |
| 9 | 6 | Wilfried Koffi Hua | Ivory Coast | 10.4 | Q |
| 10 | 1 | Aziz Zakari | Ghana | 10.5 | Q |
| 11 | 1 | Innocent Bologo | Burkina Faso | 10.5 | Q |
| 12 | 2 | Ogho-Oghene Egwero | Nigeria | 10.5 | Q |
| 13 | 2 | Hitjivirue Kaanjuka | Namibia | 10.5 | Q |
| 14 | 4 | Tim Abeyie | Ghana | 10.5 | Q |
| 15 | 5 | Lamine Niang | Senegal | 10.5 | Q |
| 16 | 6 | Emmanuel Kubi | Ghana | 10.55 | q |
| 17 | 6 | Sibusiso Matsenjwa | Swaziland | 10.59 | q |
| 18 | 2 | Fabrice Coiffic | Mauritius | 10.6 | Q |
| 19 | 4 | Dantago Gurirab | Namibia | 10.6 | Q |
| 20 | 6 | Tonny Chirchir Kipruto | Kenya | 10.6 | |
| 21 | 6 | Abdouraim Haroun | Chad | 10.6 | |
| 22 | 5 | Tinashe Mutanga | Zimbabwe | 10.61 | Q |
| 23 | 5 | Pierre Paul Bissek | Cameroon | 10.62 | q |
| 24 | 3 | Sékou Diassana | Mali | 10.65 | q |
| 25 | 1 | Ibrahim Muya | Kenya | 10.66 | q |
| 26 | 2 | Francis Zimwara | Zimbabwe | 10.66 | q |
| 27 | 1 | Delivert Arsene Kimbembe | Republic of the Congo | 10.68 | |
| 28 | 1 | Abdourahmane Ndour | Senegal | 10.7 | |
| 29 | 3 | Abdoulie Assim | Gambia | 10.7 | |
| 30 | 5 | Adama Jammeh | Gambia | 10.7 | |
| 31 | 4 | Kudzanai Alberto | Mozambique | 10.8 | |
| 32 | 6 | Enrico Louis | Mauritius | 10.8 | |
| 33 | 5 | Emmanuel Letykunye | Kenya | 10.84 | |
| 34 | 2 | Awad el Karim Makki | Sudan | 11.0 | |
| 35 | 3 | Nair Jensen | Liberia | 11.0 | |
| 36 | 5 | Mohamed Abdelazim | Sudan | 11.0 | |
| 37 | 2 | Jean Tarcisius Batamboc | Cameroon | 11.03 | |
| 38 | 5 | Prisca Baltazar | Angola | 11.1 | |
| 39 | 1 | Antimo-constantino Oyono-nchama | Equatorial Guinea | 11.2 | |
| 40 | 2 | Antonio Figia | Mozambique | 11.22 | |
| 41 | 4 | Mondouma Dziambou | Gabon | 11.41 | |
| 42 | 2 | Ould Mohamed Ahmed Tal | Mauritania | 11.7 | |
| | 4 | Thierry Ferdinand | Mauritius | DQ | |
| | 1 | Mosito Lehata | Lesotho | DNS | |
| | 3 | Emmanuel Letykunye | Kenya | DNS | |
| | 3 | Ouldrenira Nourdine | Mauritania | DNS | |
| | 4 | Abe Morlu | Liberia | DNS | |

=== Semifinals ===
Qualification: First 2 in each heat (Q) and the next 2 fastest (q) advance to the Final.

Wind:
Heat 1: +1.8 m/s, Heat 2: +2.0 m/s, Heat 3: +3.2 m/s

| Rank | Heat | Name | Nationality | Time | Notes |
|---|---|---|---|---|---|
| 1 | 2 | Ogho-Oghene Egwero | Nigeria | 10.06 | Q, PB |
| 2 | 3 | Obinna Metu | Nigeria | 10.12 | Q |
| 3 | 1 | Amr Ibrahim Mostafa Seoud | Egypt | 10.13 | Q, NR |
| 4 | 1 | Idrissa Adam | Cameroon | 10.14 | Q, NR |
| 5 | 3 | Ben Youssef Meité | Ivory Coast | 10.14 | Q |
| 6 | 3 | Aziz Zakari | Ghana | 10.20 | q |
| 7 | 3 | Mouhamadou Lamine Niang | Senegal | 10.25 | q |
| 8 | 2 | Gérard Kobéané | Burkina Faso | 10.29 | Q, PB |
| 9 | 2 | Tim Abeyie | Ghana | 10.30 | |
| 10 | 1 | Peter Emelieze | Nigeria | 10.31 | |
| 11 | 1 | Hitjivirue Kaanjuka | Namibia | 10.36 | |
| 12 | 1 | Emmanuel Kubi | Ghana | 10.37 | |
| 13 | 3 | Pierre Paul Bisseck | Cameroon | 10.37 | |
| 14 | 1 | Wilfried Koffi Hua | Ivory Coast | 10.38 | |
| 15 | 2 | Gogbeu Francis Koné | Ivory Coast | 10.39 | |
| 16 | 2 | Fabrice Coiffic | Mauritius | 10.40 | |
| 17 | 2 | Jesse Urikhob | Namibia | 10.42 | |
| 18 | 2 | Sibusiso Matsenjwa | Swaziland | 10.43 | NR |
| 19 | 1 | Francis Zimwara | Zimbabwe | 10.50 | |
| 20 | 2 | Ibrahim Muya | Kenya | 10.50 | |
| 21 | 3 | Innocent Bologo | Burkina Faso | 10.62 | |
| 22 | 3 | Sékou Diassana | Mali | 10.71 | |
| 23 | 3 | Tinashe Mutanga | Zimbabwe | 10.72 | |
| 24 | 1 | Dantago Gurirab | Namibia | 10.73 | |

=== Final ===
Wind: −0.4 m/s

| Rank | Name | Nationality | Time | Notes |
|---|---|---|---|---|
| 1st place, gold medalist(s) | Amr Ibrahim Mostafa Seoud | Egypt | 10.20 | |
| 2nd place, silver medalist(s) | Ben Youssef Meité | Ivory Coast | 10.28 | |
| 3rd place, bronze medalist(s) | Obinna Metu | Nigeria | 10.29 | |
| 4 | Ogho-Oghene Egwero | Nigeria | 10.31 | |
| 5 | Mouhamadou Lamine Niang | Senegal | 10.32 | |
| 6 | Idrissa Adam | Cameroon | 10.32 | |
| 7 | Aziz Zakari | Ghana | 10.42 | |
| 8 | Gérard Kobéané | Burkina Faso | 10.45 | |
