= Dantago Gurirab =

Namibian sprinter (born 1990)

International medals

Men's athletics

African Games
Silver medal – second place	2015 Brazzaville	4x100 m relay

Dantago Gurirab (born 9 March 1990) is a Namibian sprinter who specialized in the 100 and 200 metres.

At the 2011 All-Africa Games he reached the semi-final in both 100 and 200 metres, and at the 2015 African Games he barely missed out on the 100 metres final.

His career highlight came when taking the silver medal in the 4 × 100 metres relay at the 2015 African Games, together with teammates Even Tjiviju, Hitjivirue Kaanjuka and Jesse Urikhob. Their time of 39.22 seconds is the Namibian record.

His personal best times are 6.68 seconds in the 60 metres, achieved in January 2015 in Kingston, Jamaica; 10.35 seconds in the 100 metres, achieved at the 2015 African Games in Brazzaville; and 21.10 seconds in the 200 metres, achieved in May 2015 in Kingston.
