= Urikhob =

Urikhob is a surname. Notable people with the surname include:

- Jesse Urikhob (born 1991), Namibian athlete
- Sadney Urikhob (born 1992), Namibian footballer
