= Athletics at the 2011 All-Africa Games – Men's 200 metres =

The men's 200 metres event at the 2011 All-Africa Games was held on 14–15 September.

== Medalists ==
| Gold | Silver | Bronze |
|---|---|---|
| Idrissa Adam; Cameroon | Ben Youssef Meité; Ivory Coast | Obakeng Ngwigwa; Botswana |

== Results ==
=== Heats ===
Qualification: First 3 of each heat (Q) and the next 6 fastest (q) qualified for the semifinals.

Wind:
Heat 1: -1.1 m/s, Heat 2: -0.1 m/s, Heat 3: +0.1 m/s, Heat 4: -4.1 m/s, Heat 5: -3.0 m/s, Heat 6: -2.8 m/s

| Rank | Heat | Name | Nationality | Time | Notes |
|---|---|---|---|---|---|
| 1 | 2 | Idrissa Adam | Cameroon | 20.84 | Q |
| 2 | 2 | Obinna Metu | Nigeria | 20.92 | Q |
| 3 | 2 | Obakeng Ngwigwa | Botswana | 20.96 | Q |
| 4 | 2 | Ben Youssef Meité | Ivory Coast | 20.98 | q |
| 5 | 2 | Hitjivirue Kaanjuka | Namibia | 21.31 | q |
| 6 | 3 | Tim Abeyie | Ghana | 21.33 | Q |
| 7 | 3 | Hua Wilfrieds Serg Koffi | Ivory Coast | 21.35 | Q |
| 8 | 3 | Sibusiso Matsenjwa | Swaziland | 21.38 | Q |
| 9 | 5 | Shepherd Kofi Agbeko | Ghana | 21.39 | Q |
| 10 | 3 | Adama Jammeh | Gambia | 21.48 | Q |
| 11 | 5 | Mouhamadou Lamine Niang | Senegal | 21.50 | Q |
| 12 | 3 | Mosito Lehata | Lesotho | 21.51 | q |
| 13 | 3 | Fabrice Coiffic | Mauritius | 21.53 | q |
| 14 | 6 | Ashhad Agyapong | Ghana | 21.54 | Q |
| 15 | 5 | Gérard Kobéané | Burkina Faso | 21.55 | Q |
| 16 | 3 | Abdouraim Haroun | Chad | 21.58 | q |
| 17 | 6 | Tonny Chirchir Kipruto | Kenya | 21.63 | Q |
| 18 | 1 | Dantago Gurirab | Namibia | 21.71 | Q |
| 19 | 1 | Francis Zimwara | Zimbabwe | 21.73 | Q |
| 19 | 4 | Fanuel Kenosi | Botswana | 21.73 | Q |
| 21 | 4 | Ali Ngaimoko | Uganda | 21.74 | Q |
| 22 | 3 | Abdourahmane Ndour | Senegal | 21.76 | q |
| 23 | 1 | Delivert Arsène Kimbembe | Republic of the Congo | 21.81 | |
| 23 | 4 | Jesse Urikhob | Namibia | 21.81 | Q |
| 25 | 4 | Lebogang Moeng | South Africa | 21.88 | Q |
| 26 | 1 | Benjamin Adukwu | Nigeria | 21.89 | |
| 27 | 6 | Abdoulie Assim | Gambia | 22.11 | |
| 28 | 1 | François Belinga | Cameroon | 22.13 | |
| 29 | 2 | Baptiste Brasse | Mauritius | 22.14 | |
| 30 | 5 | Emmanuel Letykunye | Kenya | 22.19 | |
| 30 | 6 | Innocent Bologo | Burkina Faso | 22.19 | |
| 32 | 4 | Eric Milazar | Mauritius | 22.26 | |
| 33 | 4 | Pierre Paul Bisseck | Cameroon | 22.36 | |
| 34 | 3 | Mohamed Abdelazim | Sudan | 22.41 | |
| 35 | 1 | Mafo Tshihinga | Democratic Republic of the Congo | 22.55 | |
| 36 | 4 | Prisca Baltazar | Angola | 23.29 | |
| 37 | 1 | Antimo-constantino Oyono-nchama | Equatorial Guinea | 23.77 | |
| | 3 | Nair Jensen | Liberia | DQ | |

=== Semifinals ===
Qualification: First 2 of each semifinal (Q) and the next 2 fastest (q) qualified for the final.

Wind:
Heat 1: -1.9 m/s, Heat 2: -1.5 m/s, Heat 3: -2.8 m/s

| Rank | Heat | Name | Nationality | Time | Notes |
|---|---|---|---|---|---|
| 1 | 1 | Idrissa Adam | Cameroon | 21.12 | Q |
| 2 | 1 | Ben Youssef Meité | Ivory Coast | 21.27 | Q |
| 3 | 2 | Tim Abeyie | Ghana | 21.29 | Q |
| 4 | 2 | Obakeng Ngwigwa | Botswana | 21.41 | Q |
| 4 | 3 | Shepherd Kofi Agbeko | Ghana | 21.41 | Q |
| 6 | 3 | Francis Zimwara | Zimbabwe | 21.42 | Q |
| 7 | 1 | Fanuel Kenosi | Botswana | 21.45 | q |
| 8 | 3 | Sibusiso Matsenjwa | Swaziland | 21.49 | q |
| 9 | 2 | Hitjivirue Kaanjuka | Namibia | 21.53 | |
| 10 | 1 | Jesse Urikhob | Namibia | 21.54 | |
| 11 | 2 | Abdouraim Haroun | Chad | 21.56 | |
| 12 | 1 | Adama Jammeh | Gambia | 21.63 | |
| 13 | 3 | Fabrice Coiffic | Mauritius | 21.67 | |
| 14 | 3 | Gérard Kobéané | Burkina Faso | 21.69 | |
| 15 | 1 | Abdourahmane Ndour | Senegal | 21.70 | |
| 16 | 1 | Lebogang Moeng | South Africa | 21.73 | |
| 17 | 2 | Tonny Chirchir Kipruto | Kenya | 21.74 | |
| 18 | 1 | Ashhad Agyapong | Ghana | 21.78 | |
| 19 | 3 | Mosito Lehata | Lesotho | 21.91 | |
| 20 | 3 | Dantago Gurirab | Namibia | 21.93 | |
| 21 | 2 | Ali Ngaimoko | Uganda | 22.19 | |
| 22 | 2 | Hua Wilfrieds Serg Koffi | Ivory Coast | 31.52 | |
| | 2 | Obinna Metu | Nigeria | DNS | |
| | 3 | Mouhamadou Lamine Niang | Senegal | DNS | |

=== Final ===
Wind: +1.7 m/s

| Rank | Name | Nationality | Time | Notes |
|---|---|---|---|---|
| 1st place, gold medalist(s) | Idrissa Adam | Cameroon | 20.66 | |
| 2nd place, silver medalist(s) | Ben Youssef Meité | Ivory Coast | 20.76 | |
| 3rd place, bronze medalist(s) | Obakeng Ngwigwa | Botswana | 20.94 | |
| 4 | Fanuel Kenosi | Botswana | 20.98 | |
| 5 | Francis Zimwara | Zimbabwe | 20.98 | |
| 6 | Shepherd Kofi Agbeko | Ghana | 20.99 | |
| 7 | Sibusiso Matsenjwa | Swaziland | 21.08 | |
| | Tim Abeyie | Ghana | DNS | |
