= Even Tjiviju =

Namibian sprinter (born 1992)

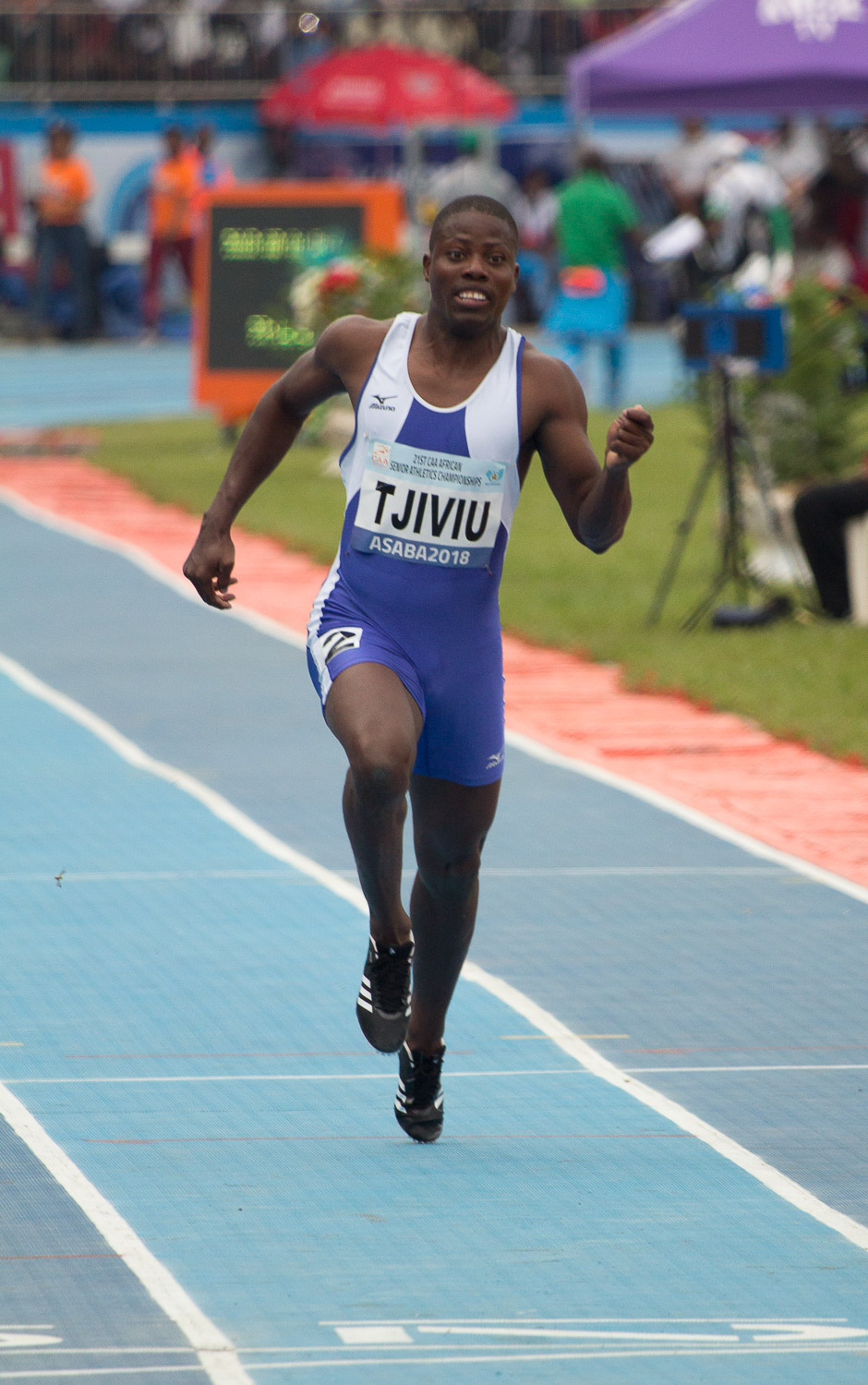
- Tjiviju at 2018 African Championships

Personal information
- Born: 2 February 1992 (age 34)

Sport
- Sport: Track and field
Medal record
Representing Namibia
African Games
Silver medal – second place	2015 Brazzaville	4x100 m relay

Even Tjiviju (born 2 February 1992) is a Namibian sprinter who specializes in the 100 and 200 metres.

In the 100 metres he reached the semi-final at the 2014 African Championships and competed at the 2016 and 2018 African Championships without reaching the final. In the 200 metres he reached the semi-final at the 2014 African Championships and the 2015 African Games. He has also been the guide for prolific Paralympic athlete Ananias Shikongo.

His career highlight came when taking the silver medal in the 4 × 100 metres relay at the 2015 African Games, together with teammates Hitjivirue Kaanjuka, Dantago Gurirab and Jesse Urikhob. Their time of 39.22 seconds is the Namibian record.

His personal best times are 10.58 seconds in the 100 metres, achieved in May 2014 in Potchefstroom; 21.14 seconds in the 200 metres, achieved in August 2014 in Marrakesh; and 47.92 seconds in the 400 metres, achieved in February 2013 in Windhoek.
