= Athletics at the 2015 African Games – Men's 4 × 100 metres relay =

The men's 4 × 100 metres relay event at the 2015 African Games was held on 15 and 16 September.

== Medalists ==
Gold	Silver	Bronze
Ivory Coast; Christopher Naliali; Hua Wilfried Koffi; Arthur Gué Cissé; Ben Youssef Meité	Namibia; Even Tjiviju; Hitjivirue Kaanjuka; Dantago Gurirab; Jesse Urikhob	Ghana; Daniel Gyasi; Solomon Afful; Emmanuel Dasor; Shepard Agbeko

== Results ==
=== Heats ===
Qualification: First 3 teams of each heat (Q) plus the next 2 fastest (q) qualified for the final.

Rank	Heat	Nation	Athletes	Time	Notes
1	2	Nigeria	Odele Tega, Obinna Metu, Divine Oduduru, Ogho Oghene Egwero	38.97	Q
2	2	Ivory Coast	Christopher Naliali, Hua Wilfried Koffi, Ben Youssef Meité, Arthur Gué Cissé	39.07	Q
3	2	Zambia	Chidamba Hazemba, Brian Kasinda, Titus Kafunda, Sydney Siame	39.31	Q, NR
4	1	Namibia	Even Tjiviju, Hitjivirue Kaanjuka, Dantago Gurirab, Jesse Urikhob	39.35	Q, NR
5	1	Kenya	Peter Mwai, Gilbert Otieno Osure, Mark Otieno, Tony Chirchir	39.71	Q
6	2	Ghana	Daniel Gyasi, Solomon Afful, Emmanuel Dasor, Shepard Agbeko	39.86	q
7	2	Botswana	Yateya Kambepera, Sakaria Kambemka, Leaname Maotoanong, Pako Seribe	39.95	q
8	1	Mauritius	Julien Miguel Meuniere, Jonathan Permal, Fabrice Coiffic, Jonathan Bardottier	40.02	Q
9	1	Gambia	Abodoulie Assim, Ebrima Camara, Faye Assan, Jammeh Adama	40.09	
10	1	Republic of the Congo	Gange Etemabeka, Gilles Anthony Afoumba, Dorian Obba, Dorian Celeste Keletela	40.82	SB
11	2	Sierra Leone	Rahman Abdul Tarawally, Bockarie Sesay, Ishmail Kamara, Vivian Williams	42.66	
12	1	Burkina Faso	Sidiki Ouedraogo, Bienvenu Wendla Sawadogo, Gérard Kobéané, Ziem Esau Somda	48.18	

=== Final ===
Rank	Lane	Nation	Athletes	Time	Notes
1st place, gold medalist(s)	6	Ivory Coast	Christopher Naliali, Hua Wilfried Koffi, Arthur Gué Cissé, Ben Youssef Meité	38.93	
2nd place, silver medalist(s)	7	Namibia	Even Tjiviju, Hitjivirue Kaanjuka, Dantago Gurirab, Jesse Urikhob	39.22	NR
3rd place, bronze medalist(s)	2	Ghana	Daniel Gyasi, Solomon Afful, Emmanuel Dasor, Shepard Agbeko	39.78	
4	5	Kenya	Peter Mwai, Gilbert Otieno Osure, Mark Otieno, Tony Chirchir	39.78	
5	3	Botswana	Yateya Kambepera, Pako Seribe, Leaname Maotoanong, Sakaria Kambemka	39.83	
6	8	Mauritius	Julien Miguel Meuniere, Jonathan Permal, Fabrice Coiffic, Jonathan Bardottier	39.98	
	4	Nigeria	Odele Tega, Obinna Metu, Ogho Oghene Egwero, Seye Ogunlewe	DQ	R170.7
	9	Zambia	Chidamba Hazemba, Brian Kasinda, Titus Kafunda, Sydney Siame	DQ	R170.7
