= Swaziland at the 2017 World Championships in Athletics =

Eswatini at the 2017 World Championships in Athletics
- WA code: SWZ

in London
- Competitors: 1
- Medals: Gold 0 Silver 0 Bronze 0 Total 0

World Championships in Athletics appearances
- 1983; 1987; 1991; 1993; 1995; 1997; 1999; 2001; 2003; 2005; 2007; 2009; 2011; 2013; 2015; 2017; 2019; 2022; 2023; 2025

Swaziland competed at the 2017 World Championships in Athletics held in London, United Kingdom, from 4 to 13 August 2017.

== Results ==
(q – qualified, NM – no mark, SB – season best)

=== Men ===
Track and road events

| Athlete | Event | Heat | | Semifinal | | Final | |
| Athlete | Event | Result | Rank | Result | Rank | Result | Rank |
|---|---|---|---|---|---|---|---|
| Sibusiso Matsenjwa | 200 metres | 20.67 | 32 | Did not advance | | | |
