= 2012 IAAF World Indoor Championships – Men's 60 metres =

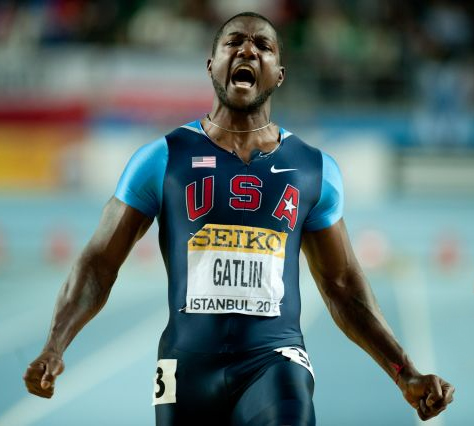
Gold medal winner Justin Gatlin celebrating his win.

The men's 60 metres at the 2012 IAAF World Indoor Championships took place March 9 and 10 at the Ataköy Athletics Arena.

== Medalists ==
Gold	Silver	Bronze
Justin Gatlin; United States	Nesta Carter; Jamaica	Dwain Chambers; Great Britain

== Records ==
Standing records prior to the 2012 IAAF World Indoor Championships
World record	Maurice Greene (USA)	6.39	Madrid, Spain	3 February 1998
World record	Maurice Greene (USA)	6.39	Atlanta, United States	3 March 2001
Championship record	Maurice Greene (USA)	6.42	Maebashi, Japan	7 March 1999
World Leading	Trell Kimmons (USA)	6.45	Albuquerque, United States	26 February 2012
African record	Leonard Myles-Mills (GHA)	6.45	Colorado Springs, United States	20 February 1999
Asian record	Talal Mansour (QAT)	6.51	Karlsruhe, Germany	6 March 1993
European record	Dwain Chambers (GBR)	6.42	Turin, Italy	7 March 2009
North and Central American and Caribbean record	Maurice Greene (USA)	6.39	Madrid, Spain	3 February 1998
North and Central American and Caribbean record	Maurice Greene (USA)	6.39	Atlanta, United States	3 March 2001
Oceanian Record	Matt Shirvington (AUS)	6.52	Maebashi, Japan	7 March 1999
South American record	José Carlos Moreira (BRA)	6.52	Paris, France	13 February 2009

== Qualification standards ==
Indoor	Outdoor
6.67	10.20 (100 m)

== Schedule ==
Date	Time	Round
March 9, 2012	17:35	Heats
March 10, 2012	17:30	Semifinals
March 10, 2012	20:00	Final

== Results ==
=== Heats ===
Qualification: First 2 of each heat (Q) and 8 fastest qualified (q). 59 athletes from 56 countries participated. Two athletes did not start the competition.

Rank	Heat	Name	Nationality	Time	Notes
1	4	Ángel David Rodríguez	Spain	6.64	Q
1	7	Justin Gatlin	United States	6.64	Q
3	8	Dwain Chambers	Great Britain	6.65	Q
4	2	Emmanuel Biron	France	6.68	Q
4	3	Simone Collio	Italy	6.68	Q
6	5	Marc Burns	Trinidad and Tobago	6.69	Q
7	6	Trell Kimmons	United States	6.70	Q
8	2	Christian Blum	Germany	6.74	Q
8	4	Nesta Carter	Jamaica	6.74	Q
8	8	Michael LeBlanc	Canada	6.74	Q
11	5	Justyn Warner	Canada	6.75	Q
12	4	Ben Youssef Meité	Côte d'Ivoire	6.77	q
13	8	Su Bingtian	China	6.84	SB, q
14	1	Peter Emelieze	Nigeria	6.85	Q
15	1	Gerald Phiri	Zambia	6.86	Q
16	1	Nilson André	Brazil	6.86	PB, q
17	6	Rytis Sakalauskas	Lithuania	6.87	Q
17	7	Reza Ghasemi	Iran	6.87	Q
19	8	Amr Ibrahim Mostafa Seoud	Egypt	6.89	q
20	1	Foo Ee Yeo	Singapore	6.90	q
20	5	Jeremy Bascom	Guyana	6.90	q
22	4	Aziz Ouhadi	Morocco	6.91	SB
22	5	Mateo Edward	Panama	6.91	PB
24	7	Holder da Silva	Guinea-Bissau	6.95	SB
25	2	Idrissa Adam	Cameroon	6.96	PB
26	7	Chun Ho Lai	Hong Kong	6.97	
27	4	Hasanain Hasan Zubaiyen	Iraq	6.98	NR
28	3	Brijesh Lawrence	Saint Kitts and Nevis	7.00	Q
28	7	Mosito Lehata	Lesotho	7.00	NR
30	6	Battulgyn Achitbileg	Mongolia	7.03	PB
31	1	Mesbah Ahmmed	Bangladesh	7.04	NR
31	3	Sibusiso Matsenjwa	Swaziland	7.04	NR
31	4	Keiron Rogers	Anguilla	7.04	NR
34	3	Lerone Clarke	Jamaica	7.05	
34	7	Jean Thierie Ferdinand	Mauritius	7.05	PB
36	1	Cristian Leguizamón	Paraguay	7.13	PB
37	5	Roy Ravana	Fiji	7.17	NR
38	2	Raihau Maiau	French Polynesia	7.18	NR
39	2	Rodman Teltull	Palau	7.20	NR
40	8	Imran Khan	Pakistan	7.21	PB
41	2	Ibrahim Kabia	Sierra Leone	7.33	
41	6	Ahmed Azneem	Maldives	7.33	PB
43	4	Courtney Carl Williams	Saint Vincent and the Grenadines	7.35	PB
44	2	Valeriy Ponomarev	Kyrgyzstan	7.38	
45	6	Roman Cress	Marshall Islands	7.43	SB
46	1	Chris Meke Walasi	Solomon Islands	7.47	PB
47	1	Ghislain Nsimba Mandualika	Democratic Republic of the Congo	7.47	PB
48	8	Shakyll Lourens	Aruba	7.49	PB
49	4	Joshua Jeremiah	Nauru	7.50	PB
49	7	Dominic Carroll	Gibraltar	7.50	SB
51	5	Mikel de Sa	Andorra	7.51	
52	3	Federico Gorrieri	San Marino	7.54	SB
53	3	Nooa Takooa	Kiribati	7.57	PB
54	8	Tavevele Noa	Tuvalu	7.61	NR
55	5	Joseph Andy Lui	Tonga	7.71	PB
56	3	Dayne O'Hara	Norfolk Island	7.75	PB
57	8	Alhassane Keita	Guinea	8.12	PB
	6	John Howard	Federated States of Micronesia	DSQ	FS
	6	Tim Abeyie	Ghana	DSQ	FS
	2	Innocent Bologo	Burkina Faso	DNS	
	5	Chencho Gyeltshen	Bhutan	DNS	

=== Semifinals ===
Qualification: First 2 of each heat (Q) and 2 fastest times (q) qualified. 22 athletes from 21 countries participated. One athlete did not start the competition.

Rank	Heat	Name	Nationality	Time	Notes
1	1	Justin Gatlin	United States	6.50	Q
2	2	Nesta Carter	Jamaica	6.56	Q
3	3	Trell Kimmons	United States	6.61	Q
4	2	Dwain Chambers	Great Britain	6.62	Q
4	3	Marc Burns	Trinidad and Tobago	6.62	Q
6	2	Emmanuel Biron	France	6.65	q
7	3	Justyn Warner	Canada	6.67	q
8	1	Aziz Ouhadi	Morocco	6.68	NR, Q
9	1	Rytis Sakalauskas	Lithuania	6.69	
10	1	Michael LeBlanc	Canada	6.71	
10	1	Simone Collio	Italy	6.71	
10	1	Ben Youssef Meité	Côte d'Ivoire	6.71	
10	3	Ángel David Rodríguez	Spain	6.71	
14	3	Su Bingtian	China	6.74	SB
15	2	Jeremy Bascom	Guyana	6.77	
16	2	Christian Blum	Germany	6.79	
17	2	Reza Ghasemi	Iran	6.79	
18	2	Brijesh Lawrence	Saint Kitts and Nevis	6.80	
19	1	Peter Emelieze	Nigeria	6.81	
20	1	Amr Ibrahim Mostafa Seoud	Egypt	6.83	
21	3	Mateo Edward	Panama	6.91	PB
22	2	Foo Ee Yeo	Singapore	6.93	
22	3	Nilson André	Brazil	6.93	
	3	Gerald Phiri	Zambia	DNS	

=== Final ===
8 athletes from 7 countries participated. The final began at 20:05.

Rank	Name	Nationality	Time	Notes
1st place, gold medalist(s)	Justin Gatlin	United States	6.46	SB
2nd place, silver medalist(s)	Nesta Carter	Jamaica	6.54	
3rd place, bronze medalist(s)	Dwain Chambers	Great Britain	6.60	
4	Trell Kimmons	United States	6.60	
5	Marc Burns	Trinidad and Tobago	6.62	
6	Emmanuel Biron	France	6.63	
7	Justyn Warner	Canada	6.65	
8	Aziz Ouhadi	Morocco	6.72	
