= Agbeko =

Agbeko is a surname. Notable people with the surname include:

- Joseph Agbeko (born 1980), Ghanaian boxer
- Shepherd Agbeko (born 1985), Ghanaian sprinter
