= Gérard Kobéané =

Burkinabé sprinter

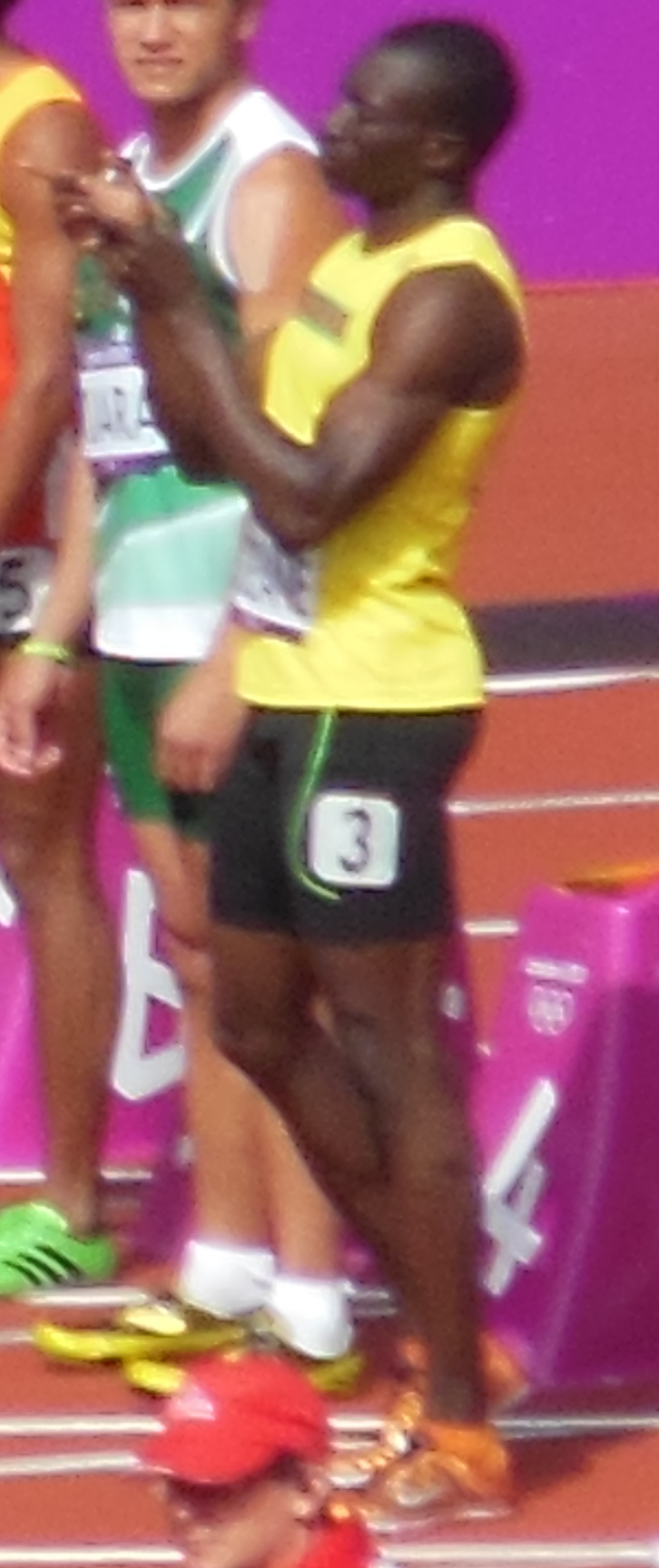
- Kobéané at the 2012 Summer Olympics

Personal information
- Born: 24 April 1988 (age 38) Karangasso-Vigué Department, Burkina Faso
- Height: 1.79 m (5 ft 10 in)
- Weight: 74 kg (163 lb)

Sport
- Sport: Athletics
- Events: 100 m, 200 m

Gérard Kobéané (born 24 April 1988) is a Burkinabé sprinter. At the 2012 Summer Olympics, he competed in the 100 metres preliminaries advancing to the first round where he was eliminated.

== Competition record ==
Year	Competition	Venue	Position	Event	Notes
Representing Burkina Faso
2007	African Junior Championships	Ouagadougou, Burkina Faso	10th (sf)	100 m	11.08
2009	Universiade	Belgrade, Serbia	14th (sf)	100 m	10.53
2009	Jeux de la Francophonie	Beirut, Lebanon	8th (sf)	100 m	10.45
2009	Jeux de la Francophonie	Beirut, Lebanon	1st	4 × 100 m relay	39.57
2010	African Championships	Nairobi, Kenya	11th (sf)	100 m	10.45
2010	African Championships	Nairobi, Kenya	7th	4 × 100 m relay	40.25 (Note: Disqualified in the final)
2011	Universiade	Shenzhen, China	24th (qf)	100 m	10.57
2011	World Championships	Daegu, South Korea	39th (h)	100 m	10.59
2011	All-Africa Games	Maputo, Mozambique	8th	100 m	10.45
2011	All-Africa Games	Maputo, Mozambique	14th (sf)	200 m	21.69
2012	African Championships	Porto-Novo, Benin	11th (sf)	100 m	10.56
2012	African Championships	Porto-Novo, Benin	19th (h)	200 m	21.52
2012	African Championships	Porto-Novo, Benin	–	4 × 100 m relay	DNF
2012	Olympic Games	London, United Kingdom	43rd (h)	100 m	10.48
2013	Jeux de la Francophonie	Nice, France	7th	100 m	10.74
2013	Jeux de la Francophonie	Nice, France	7th	200 m	21.63
2013	Jeux de la Francophonie	Nice, France	4th	4 × 100 m relay	40.35
2015	African Games	Brazzaville, Republic of the Congo	12th (sf)	100 m	10.44
2015	African Games	Brazzaville, Republic of the Congo	22nd (h)	200 m	21.39
2015	African Games	Brazzaville, Republic of the Congo	12th (h)	4 × 100 m relay	48.18
2016	World Indoor Championships	Portland, United States	34th (h)	60 m	6.80
2017	Jeux de la Francophonie	Abidjan, Ivory Coast	14th (h)	100 m	10.70
2017	Jeux de la Francophonie	Abidjan, Ivory Coast	–	200 m	DQ
2017	Jeux de la Francophonie	Abidjan, Ivory Coast	7th	4 × 100 m relay	41.21
2017	Jeux de la Francophonie	Abidjan, Ivory Coast	6th	4 × 400 m relay	3:18.13

== Personal bests ==
Outdoor

- 100 metres – 10.29 (+2.0 m/s, Maputo 2011)
- 200 metres – 21.38 (-0.6 m/s, Porto Novo 2012)

Indoor

- 60 metres – 6.76 (Birmingham 2016)
