= Katim Touré =

Senegalese sprinter

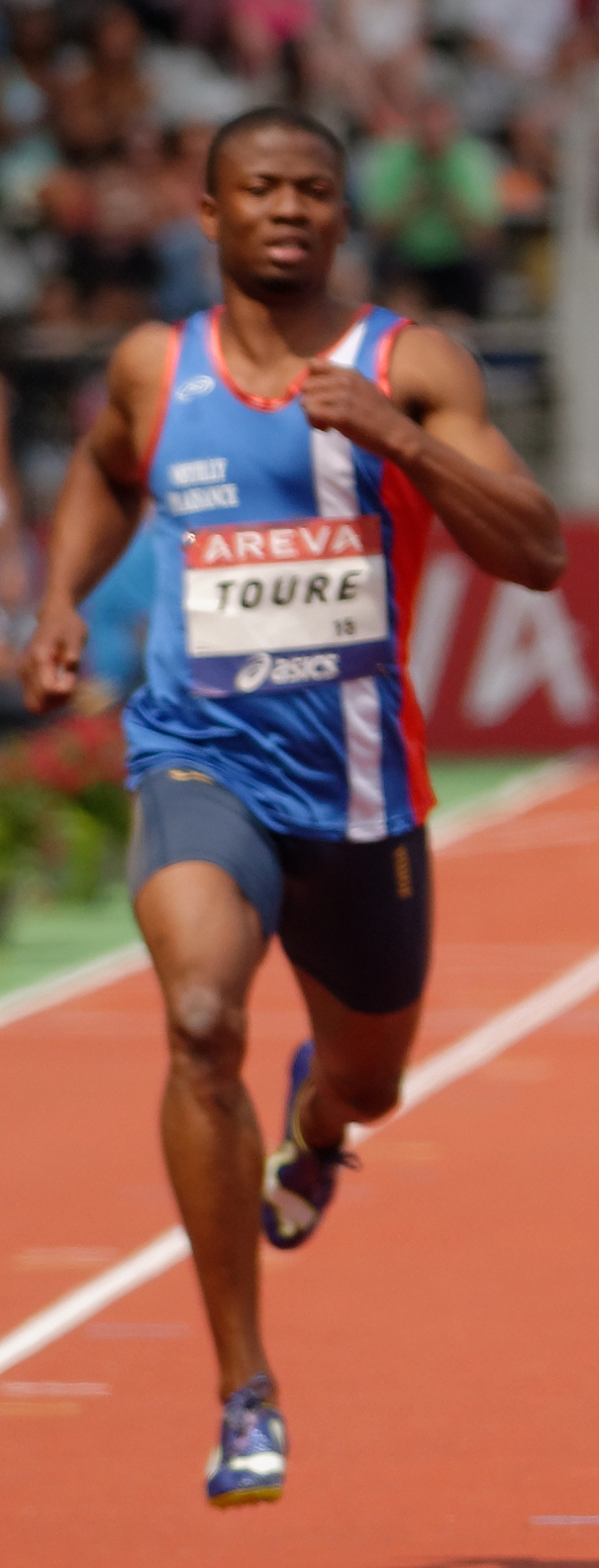
Katim Touré (2013)

Katim Touré (born 2 January 1987) is a Senegalese sprinter who specializes in the 100 and 200 metres.

Touré was a star of the 2005 African Junior Championships, where he won the 100 metres gold as well as 200 meters and relay silver medals. In the same year he competed at the 2005 Islamic Solidarity Games, and while still a junior he competed in three events at the 2006 World Junior Championships.

He reached the semi-final in the 100 metres at the 2007 All-Africa Games and the 2008 African Championships. At the 2015 African Games he competed in the heats of the 100 and 200 metres.

His personal best times are 10.39 seconds in the 100 metres, achieved in June 2013 in Montgeron; and 21.02 seconds in the 200 metres, achieved in June 2015 in Ivry-sur-Seine.
