= Adama Jammeh (sprinter) =

Gambian sprinter (born 1993)

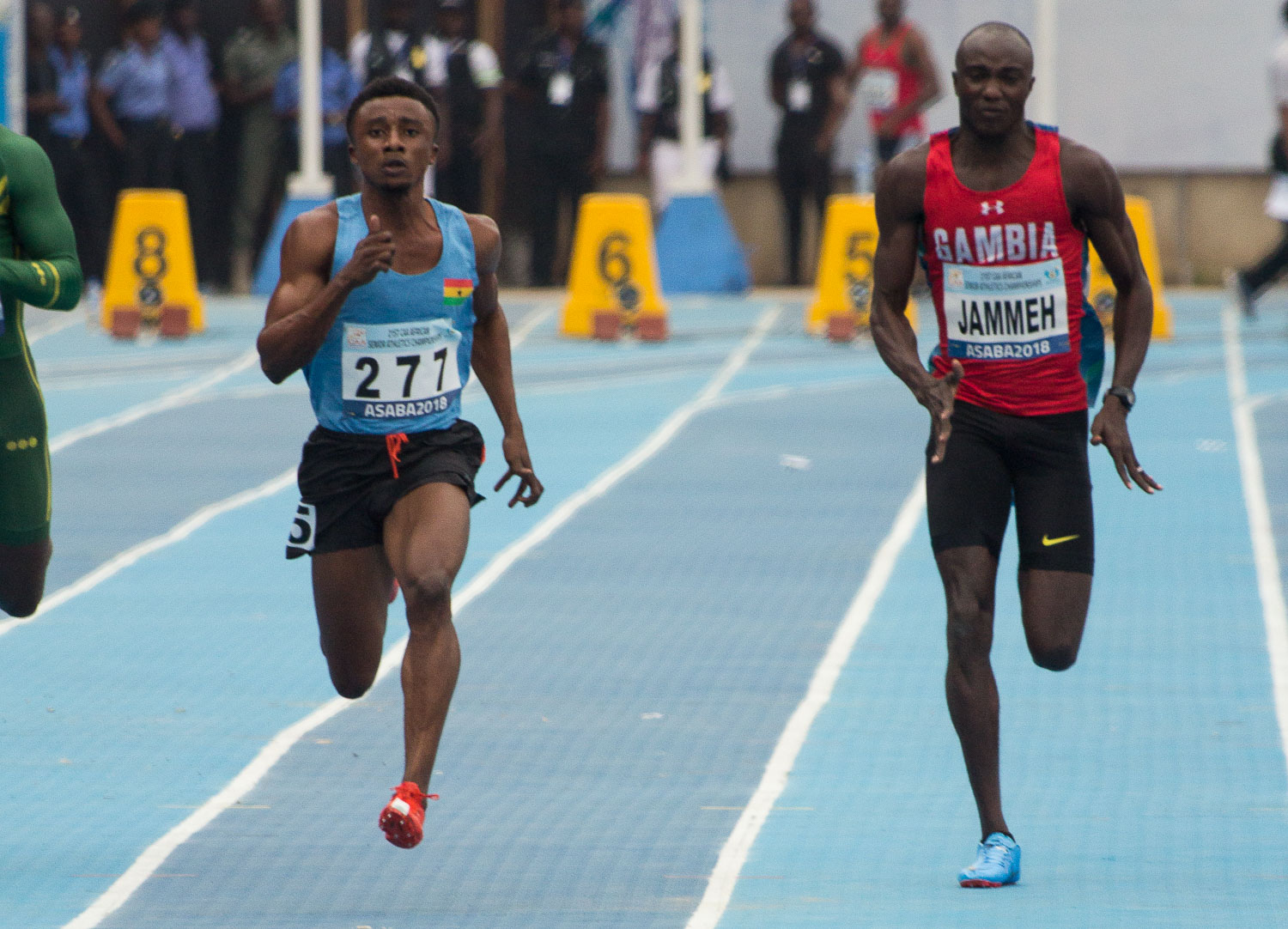
- Adama Jammeh (r) at the 2018 African Championships

Personal information
- Born: 10 June 1993 (age 33)

Sport
- Sport: Athletics
- Events: 100 m, 200 m
Medal record
Men's athletics
Representing Gambia
African Championships
Silver medal – second place	2016 Durban	200 m

Adama Jammeh (born 10 June 1993) is a Gambian sprinter. He competed in the 200 metres at the 2015 World Championships in Beijing without advancing from the first round.

== Competition record ==
Year	Competition	Venue	Position	Event	Notes
Representing Gambia
2011	All-Africa Games	Maputo, Mozambique	30th (h)	100 m	10.7
2011	All-Africa Games	Maputo, Mozambique	12th (sf)	200 m	21.63
2012	African Championships	Porto-Novo, Benin	16th (sf)	100 m	10.65
2012	African Championships	Porto-Novo, Benin	10th (sf)	200 m	21.02
2012	African Championships	Porto-Novo, Benin	7th (h)	4 × 100 m relay	40.42 (Note: Disqualified in the final)
2013	Islamic Solidarity Games	Palembang, Indonesia	6th	100 m	10.59
2013	Islamic Solidarity Games	Palembang, Indonesia	5th	200 m	21.34
2014	African Championships	Marrakesh, Morocco	9th (sf)	100 m	10.41
2014	African Championships	Marrakesh, Morocco	5th	200 m	20.80
2015	World Championships	Beijing, China	42nd (h)	200 m	20.81
2015	African Games	Brazzaville, Republic of the Congo	10th (sf)	100 m	10.40
2015	African Games	Brazzaville, Republic of the Congo	4th	200 m	20.74
2015	African Games	Brazzaville, Republic of the Congo	9th (h)	4 × 100 m relay	40.09
2016	African Championships	Durban, South Africa	8th (sf)	100 m	10.29
2016	African Championships	Durban, South Africa	2nd	200 m	20.45
2016	Olympic Games	Rio de Janeiro, Brazil	38th (h)	200 m	20.55
2017	Islamic Solidarity Games	Baku, Azerbaijan	9th (sf)	100 m	10.48
2017	Islamic Solidarity Games	Baku, Azerbaijan	4th	200 m	20.86
2017	Islamic Solidarity Games	Baku, Azerbaijan	4th	4 × 100 m relay	40.20
2017	World Championships	London, United Kingdom	35th (h)	200 m	20.79
2018	Commonwealth Games	Gold Coast, Australia	37th (h)	100 m	10.59
2018	Commonwealth Games	Gold Coast, Australia	25th (h)	200 m	21.11
2018	African Championships	Asaba, Nigeria	15th (sf)	100 m	10.64
2018	African Championships	Asaba, Nigeria	8th	200 m	20.91
2019	African Games	Rabat, Morocco	15th (sf)	100 m	10.49 (Note: Did not finish in the semifinal)
2022	African Championships	Port Louis, Mauritius	32nd (h)	100 m	10.59
2022	African Championships	Port Louis, Mauritius	9th (h)	4 × 100 m relay	41.93
2022	Islamic Solidarity Games	Konya, Turkey	4th	4 × 100 m relay	39.27
2024	African Games	Accra, Ghana	14th (sf)	100 m	10.57
2024	African Games	Accra, Ghana	7th	200 m	21.14
2024	African Games	Accra, Ghana	5th	4 × 100 m relay	39.24
2024	African Championships	Douala, Cameroon	14th (sf)	100 m	10.31
2024	African Championships	Douala, Cameroon	14th (sf)	200 m	21.23
2024	African Championships	Douala, Cameroon	3rd (h)	4 × 100 m relay	39.79
2025	Islamic Solidarity Games	Riyadh, Saudi Arabia	10th (h)	200 m	21.63

== Personal bests ==
Outdoor

- 100 metres – 10.25 (+0.9 m/s, Montgeron 2016)
- 200 metres – 20.58 (-0.3 m/s, Remire Montjoly 2016)
