= Amr Ibrahim Mostafa Seoud =

Egyptian sprinter

Medal record

Men's athletics

Representing Egypt

All-Africa Games
Gold medal – first place	2011 Maputo	100 m

African Championships
Gold medal – first place	2010 Nairobi	200 m
Silver medal – second place	2012 Porto-Novo	100 m
Silver medal – second place	2012 Porto-Novo	200 m

Mediterranean Games
Gold medal – first place	2009 Pescara	200 m

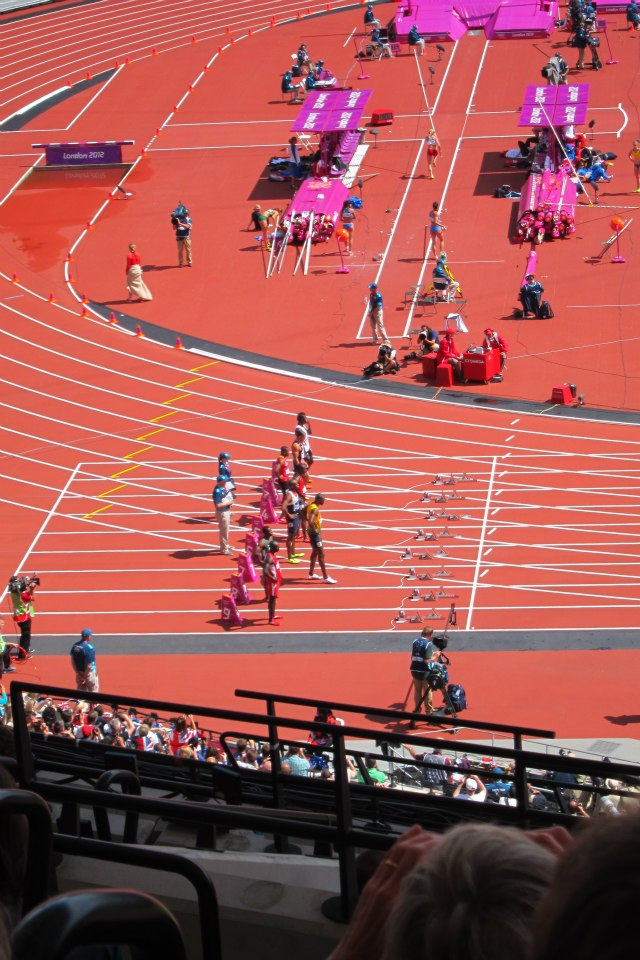
Before the start of the first round in the 100 m at the 2012 Summer Olympics

Amr Ibrahim Mostafa Seoud (born 10 June 1986 in Damietta) is an Egyptian sprinter who specializes in 100 and 200 metres. His personal best times are 10.13 and 20.36 seconds in the 100 and 200 metres.

He ranked sixth in the 100 metres at the 2006 African Championships. In the 200 metres, he won the 2007 Summer Universiade, and competed at the 2007 World Championships without reaching the final round. He also competed in 60 metres at the World Indoor Championships in 2003 and 2008.

Seoud represented Egypt at the 2008 Summer Olympics in Beijing. He competed at the 200 metres and placed fifth in his first round heat in a time of 20.75 seconds. His record was among the ten best losing times, which granted him a slot in the second round. He improved his time in the second round to 20.55 seconds, placing sixth. This performance was not enough to qualify for the semi-finals.

At the 2012 Summer Olympics he competed in both the 100 and 200 metres, but did not qualify from the heats.

== Achievements ==
Year	Competition	Venue	Position	Event	Notes
Representing Egypt
2003	World Indoor Championships	Birmingham, United Kingdom	44th (h)	60 m	6.93
2003	World Youth Championships	Sherbrooke, Canada	35th (h)	100 m	11.06
2003	World Youth Championships	Sherbrooke, Canada	12th (sf)	200 m	21.89
2003	African Junior Championships	Garoua, Cameroon	4th	100 m	10.66 (w)
2003	African Junior Championships	Garoua, Cameroon	2nd	200 m	21.40 (w)
2005	Mediterranean Games	Almería, Spain	–	200 m	DNF
2005	Jeux de la Francophonie	Niamey, Niger	3rd	100 m	10.55
2005	Jeux de la Francophonie	Niamey, Niger	6th (h)	200 m	21.29
2006	African Championships	Bambous, Mauritius	6th	100 m	10.81
2006	African Championships	Bambous, Mauritius	10th (sf)	200 m	21.32
2007	All-Africa Games	Algiers, Algeria	13th (sf)	100 m	10.52
2007	All-Africa Games	Algiers, Algeria	4th	200 m	21.07
2007	Universiade	Bangkok, Thailand	7th	100 m	10.53
2007	Universiade	Bangkok, Thailand	1st	200 m	20.74
2007	World Championships	Osaka, Japan	20th (qf)	200 m	20.72
2007	Pan Arab Games	Cairo, Egypt	1st	100 m	10.38 (NR)
2007	Pan Arab Games	Cairo, Egypt	1st	200 m	20.69
2007	Pan Arab Games	Cairo, Egypt	4th	4 × 100 m relay	40.17 (NR)
2008	World Indoor Championships	Valencia, Spain	14th (sf)	60 m	6.69 (NR)
2008	Olympic Games	Beijing, China	15th (qf)	200 m	20.45
2009	Mediterranean Games	Pescara, Italy	7th	100 m	10.45
2009	Mediterranean Games	Pescara, Italy	1st	200 m	20.78
2009	Universiade	Belgrade, Serbia	2nd	100 m	10.31
2009	Universiade	Belgrade, Serbia	2nd	200 m	20.52
2009	World Championships	Berlin, Germany	51st (h)	200 m	21.44
2009	Jeux de la Francophonie	Beirut, Lebanon	6th	100 m	10.42 (w)
2010	African Championships	Nairobi, Kenya	4th	100 m	10.18
2010	African Championships	Nairobi, Kenya	1st	200 m	20.36 (NR)
2011	World Championships	Daegu, South Korea	18th (sf)	200 m	21.15
2011	All-Africa Games	Maputo, Mozambique	1st	100 m	10.20 (NR)
2012	World Indoor Championships	Istanbul, Turkey	20th (sf)	60 m	6.83
2012	African Championships	Porto-Novo, Benin	2nd	100 m	10.34
2012	African Championships	Porto-Novo, Benin	2nd	200 m	20.76
2012	Olympic Games	London, United Kingdom	22nd (h)	100 m	10.22
2012	Olympic Games	London, United Kingdom	36th (h)	200 m	20.81
2013	Mediterranean Games	Mersin, Turkey	6th	100 m	10.40
2013	Mediterranean Games	Mersin, Turkey	6th	200 m	20.84
2013	Islamic Solidarity Games	Palembang, Indonesia	5th	100 m	10.56
