= Swaziland at the 1983 World Championships in Athletics =

Eswatini at the 1983 World Championships in Athletics
- Flag of Eswatini
- WA code: SWZ

in Helsinki, Finland August 7–14, 1983
- Competitors: 2 (1 man and 1 woman) in 2 events
- Medals: Gold 0 Silver 0 Bronze 0 Total 0

World Championships in Athletics appearances
- 1983; 1987; 1991; 1993; 1995; 1997; 1999; 2001; 2003; 2005; 2007; 2009; 2011; 2013; 2015; 2017; 2019; 2022; 2023

Swaziland (now known as Eswatini) competed at the 1983 World Championships in Athletics in Helsinki, Finland, from August 7 to 14, 1983.

== Men ==
Track and road events

Athlete	Event	Final	
Athlete	Event	Result	Rank
Samuel Hlawe	Marathon	2:26:42	49

== Women ==
Track and road events

Athlete	Event	Heat		Quarterfinal		Semifinal		Final	
Athlete	Event	Result	Rank	Result	Rank	Result	Rank	Result	Rank
Annah Mathunjwa	200 metres	29.38	41	Did not advance					
