= Coblenz, Namibia =

Coblenz
- Village
- Location in Namibia
- Coordinates: 20°6′S 18°10′E
- Country: Namibia
- Region: Otjozondjupa Region
- Constituency: Okakarara Constituency
- Time zone: UTC+2 (SAST)
- Climate: BSh

Coblenz is a settlement with about 1000 inhabitants (as of 2009) in the Otjozondjupa Region of northeastern Namibia. Coblenz is situated about 65 kilometres (40 mi) south of Grootfontein by road. It belongs to the Okakarara electoral constituency.

== History ==
Due to its location at the confluence of two rivers, the town was given the name Coblenz in the days of German South West Africa, in reference to the German city of Koblenz on the Rhine and Moselle, which was still spelled Coblenz until 1926.

== Landmarks ==
The settlement is a regional center of the San and has amenities such as a community school, clinic and retail outlets. A police station was completed in 2013.

== Notable people ==
- Hitjivirue Kaanjuka (born 1987) - sprinter
