= Hitjivirue Kaanjuka =

Namibian sprinter (born 1987)

Personal information
- Nationality: Namibian
- Born: 29 December 1987 (age 38) Coblenz, Namibia

Sport
- Sport: Athletics
- Event: Sprints

Achievements and titles
- Personal bests: 10.36 s (100 m), 20.69 s (200 m)
Medal record
Men's Athletics
African Games
Silver medal – second place	2015 Brazzaville	4x100 m relay

Hitjivirue Kaanjuka (born 29 December 1987) is a Namibian sprinter who competed in the 100 and 200 metres events. He competed at one Commonwealth Games, two World Championships and six African Championships and Games, winning a silver medal in the relay at his last African Games.

== Career ==
In 2005 he received a N$3 000 grant from the Frankie Fredericks Foundation. His first international victory came at the African Southern Region Championships in 2005, where he won the 200 metres. He finished second in the same event in 2007. He also competed in the 200 metres races at the 2006 Commonwealth Games (disqualified), 2007 World Championships and the 2007 All-Africa Games (as well as the 2007 All-Africa Games 100 metres without reaching the final.

At the 2008 African Championships he finished fifth in the 100 metres race and seventh in the 200 metres. In both competitions, he ran faster in the semi-final—recording 10.40 seconds versus 10.50 in the final. In the 200 metres, his final time of 21.28 seconds was overshadowed by both his heat time of 21.18 and the semi-final time of 21.22 which was recorded in a –3.6 m/s headwind. He also competed at the Meeting Grand Prix IAAF de Dakar in 2008.

Kaanjuka missed most of 2009, but returned in 2010. Mainly competing out of South Africa, he participated out-of-competition at the South African Championships before winning his first Namibian Championship, in the 200 metres. He subsequently competed at the 2010 African Championships, reaching the semi-final in both 100 and 200 metres.

Having started 2011 in South Africa as well, he competed extensively in Austria and Germany in June and July before the 2011 All-Africa Games in September. Again he reached the semi-final in both 100 and 200 metres. His stay in Europe in June–July 2012 included Finland, Germany and Switzerland, but intermittently, the 2012 African Championships took place in Benin, where he yet again bowed out in the semi-finals of both the 100 and 200 metres. Back-to-back titles in 100 and 200 metres at the 2013 Namibian Championships were followed by spells in South Africa and Central Europe before Kaanjuka was able to return to the World Championships after six years. He did not progress past the heats, however.

In late 2013, a Namibian Athletics Development Programme was set up in Kingston, Jamaica, with several members of the national team training there. 2014 therefore saw Kaanjuka competing in the United States and Jamaica for the first time, but no major championships. He did however continue there in 2015, which also saw the 2015 IAAF World Relays held on the same continent, in the Bahamas. Participating in the 4 × 200 metres relay, his team was disqualified. They fared better in the 4 × 100 metres relay at the 2015 African Games, where Kaanjuka won the silver medal together with teammates Even Tjiviju, Dantago Gurirab and Jesse Urikhob. Their time of 39.22 seconds is the Namibian record. Individually at the 2015 African Games, Kaanjuka only reached the heat and semi-final of the 100 and 200 metres respectively. His last major competition was the 2016 Penn Relays.

His personal best times were 10.36 seconds in the 100 metres, achieved at the 2011 All-Africa Games in Maputo; and 20.69 seconds in the 200 metres, achieved at the 2013 Namibian Championships in Windhoek.

== Personal life ==
He was born in Coblenz near Grootfontein. His athletic talent was discovered in school, with him joining the Cheetahs Athletics Club and in 2001 the Welwitschia Athletics Club under coach Letu Hamhola. After the 2006 Commonwealth Games, he turned down an athletic scholarship from the US and instead took a scholarship at the High Performance Centre, University of Pretoria.

He is nicknamed Hitch. In 2013 he took a job as a police constable.
