= Okakarara Constituency =

Electoral constituency in Namibia

Coordinates: 20°35′S 17°26′E

Okakarara constituency (red) in the Otjozondjupa Region

Okakarara Constituency is an electoral constituency in the Otjozondjupa Region of Namibia. It had 21,336 inhabitants in 2004 and 16,221 registered voters in 2020. The constituency consists of the town of Okakarara and the surrounding rural area, including the settlements of Coblenz, Okondjatu and Okatjoruu.

== Politics ==
Okakarara is one of the few Namibian constituencies that are not dominated by the SWAPO Party. In the 2004 regional election, Vetaruhe Kandorozu of the National Unity Democratic Organisation (NUDO) received 3,647 of the 6,472 votes cast and became councillor.

In the 2015 regional election councillor Kandorozu (NUDO) was reelected with 3,628 votes, followed by Jonathan Tjakuva (SWAPO) with 2,126 votes and Abdal Mutjavikua of the Democratic Turnhalle Alliance (DTA) with 1,702 votes. Mujazu Urika of the South West Africa National Union (SWANU) also ran and gained 100 votes. Kandorozu was expelled from NUDO in October 2020 after losing the election for the party's presidency to Esther Muinjangue and subsequently supporting independent presidential candidate Panduleni Itula in her stead.

The NUDO candidate also won the 2020 regional election. Abdal Mutjavikua received 2,813 votes, well ahead of Gebhard Kandango (SWAPO) with 1,544 votes. Uamunika Murangi of the Popular Democratic Movement (PDM, the new name of the DTA, 350 votes) came third with 1,455 votes, and independent candidate Ambrosius Mundjindjiri gained 1,385 votes.
