= Athletics at the 2003 All-Africa Games – Men's 4 × 100 metres relay =

The men's 4 × 100 metres relay event at the 2003 All-Africa Games was held on October 14–15.

== Medalists ==
Gold	Silver	Bronze
Ghana; Christian Nsiah; Eric Nkansah; Aziz Zakari; Leonard Myles-Mills	Nigeria; Aaron Egbele; Tamunosiki Atorudibo; Musa Deji; Deji Aliu	Senegal; Oumar Loum; Félou Doudou Sow; Gora Diop; Abdou Demba Lam

== Results ==
=== Heats ===
Qualification: First 3 teams of each heat (Q) plus the next 2 fastest (q) qualified for the final.

Rank	Heat	Nation	Athletes	Time	Notes
1	2	Nigeria	Deji Aliu, Tamunosiki Atorudibo, Musa Deji, Aaron Egbele	39.23	Q
2	1	Senegal	Abdou Demba Lam, Félou Doudou Sow, Gora Diop, Oumar Loum	39.99	Q
3	1	Ghana	Ernest Osei, Eric Nkansah, Leonard Myles-Mills, Christian Nsiah	40.01	Q
4	2	South Africa	Godfrey Khotso Mokoena, Mathew Quinn, Frikkie van Zyl, Clinton Venter	40.41	Q
5	1	Cameroon	Emmanuel Ngom Priso, Dieudonné Tiekim, Alain Olivier Nyounai, Joseph Batangdon	40.52	Q
6	2	Liberia	Koiyan Morlu, Joseph Brent, Kouty Mawenh, Augustine Schmader	40.79	Q
7	1	Sierra Leone	Lamin Tucker, Alie Dady Bangura, David Aruna, Samuel Randall	40.80	q
8	1	Ivory Coast	Tiecoura Kouassi, Marius Loua, Arsene Koffi, Ben-Youssef Meïté	40.81	q
9	2	Republic of the Congo	Roger Angouono-Moke, Chelly Goualetou-Nomala, Devilert Kimbembe, David Nkoua	41.60	
10	2	Benin	Souhalia Alamou, Josias Mevognon, Abdoulaye Chérif Issa, Gerald-James Tchiakpe	41.63	
	2	Zimbabwe		DNS	

=== Final ===
Rank	Nation	Athletes	Time	Notes
1st place, gold medalist(s)	Ghana	Christian Nsiah, Eric Nkansah, Aziz Zakari, Leonard Myles-Mills	38.63	
2nd place, silver medalist(s)	Nigeria	Aaron Egbele, Tamunosiki Atorudibo, Musa Deji, Deji Aliu	38.70	
3rd place, bronze medalist(s)	Senegal	Oumar Loum, Félou Doudou Sow, Gora Diop, Abdou Demba Lam	38.79	
4	Cameroon	Emmanuel Ngom Priso, Dieudonné Tiekim, Alain Olivier Nyounai, Joseph Batangdon	39.94	
5	South Africa	Godfrey Khotso Mokoena, Mathew Quinn, Frikkie van Zyl, Clinton Venter	40.06	
6	Liberia	Koiyan Morlu, Joseph Brent, Kouty Mawenh, Augustine Schmader	40.49	
7	Ivory Coast	Ben-Youssef Meïté, Tiecoura Kouassi, Arsene Koffi, Marius Loua	40.81	
8	Sierra Leone	Lamin Tucker, Alah Yambasu, Sandy Walker, Alie Dady Bangura	40.87	
