= Francis Zimwara =

Zimbabwean sprinter

Francis Zimwara (born 22 June 1986) is a retired Zimbabwean sprinter who specialized in the 100 and 200 metres.

In the 100 metres he competed at the 2011 All-Africa Games, the 2012 African Championships, the 2014 African Championships and the 2015 African Games without reaching the final, but reaching the semi-final in 2011 and 2015.

In the 200 metres he finished fifth at the 2011 All-Africa Games, reached the semi-final at the 2012 African Championships and reached the final without starting the final race at the 2014 African Championships.

He also finished eighth in the 4 × 100 metres relay at the 2016 African Championships. His personal best times were 10.38 seconds in the 100 metres, achieved in May 2012 in Pretoria; 20.83 seconds in the 200 metres, achieved in August 2014 in Marrakesh; and 47.45 seconds in the 400 metres, achieved in March 2014 in Bambous, Mauritius.
