= Bernard Kaanjuka =

Namibian football manager

Personal information
- Place of birth: Namibia

Managerial career
- Years: Team
- 2011–2013: Namibia

Bernard Kaanjuka is a former manager of the Namibia national football team, a role he held on an interim basis from September 2011 until resigning in March 2013.
