= Solomon Islands at the 2010 Commonwealth Games =

Sporting event delegation

Flag of the Solomon Islands

Solomon Islands competed in the 2010 Commonwealth Games held in Delhi, India, from 3 to 14 October 2010.

The country was represented by twelve athletes, competed in athletics, boxing, tennis, weightlifting and wrestling.

== See also ==
- 2010 Commonwealth Games
