= Wilfried Koffi Hua =

Ivorian sprinter (born 1987)

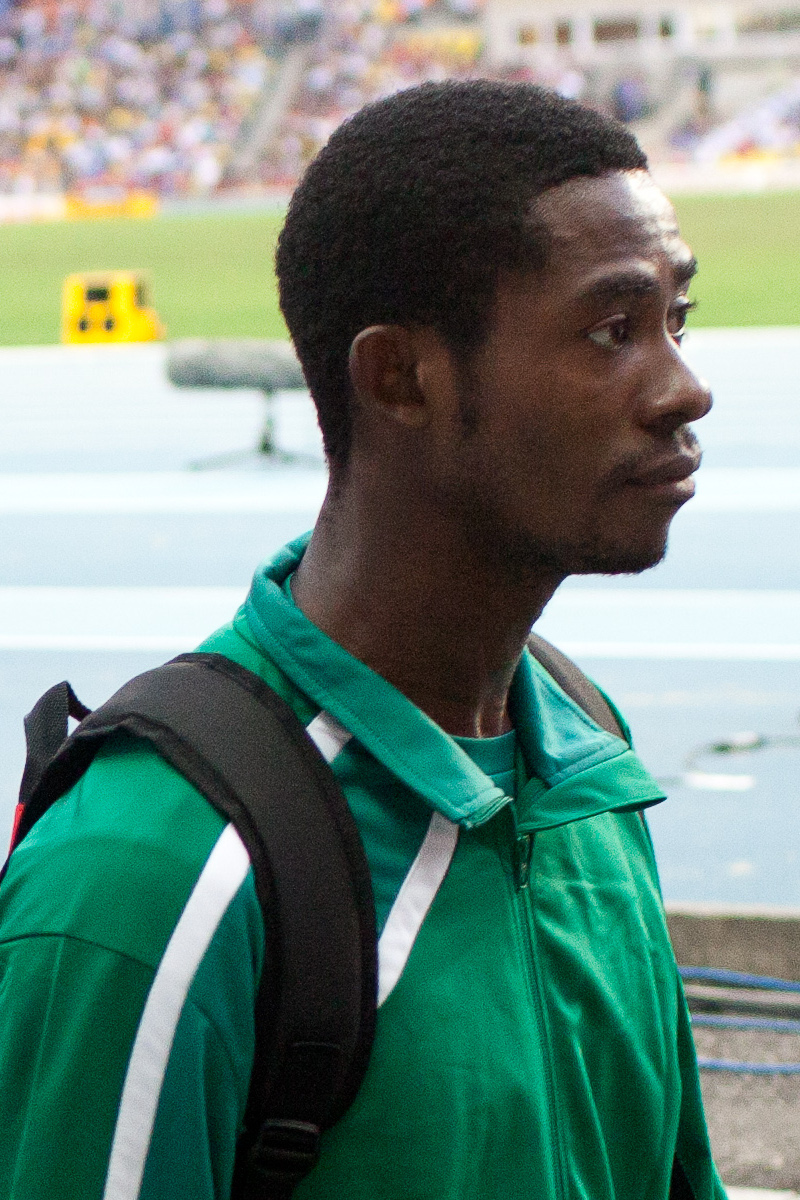
- Koffi at the 2013 World Championships

Personal information
- Nationality: Ivory Coast
- Born: 12 October 1987 (age 38)
- Height: 1.86 m (6 ft 1 in)
- Weight: 88 kg (194 lb)

Sport
- Sport: Athletics
- Event: 100 m / 200 m
- College team: Shanghai University
Medal record
Men's athletics
Representing Ivory Coast
All-Africa Games
Gold medal – first place	2015 Brazzaville	200 m
Gold medal – first place	2015 Brazzaville	4x100 m
Bronze medal – third place	2015 Brazzaville	100 m
African Championships
Gold medal – first place	2014 Marrakesh	100 m
Gold medal – first place	2014 Marrakesh	200 m
Silver medal – second place	2016 Durban	4×100 m
Bronze medal – third place	2012 Porto-Novo	100 m
Bronze medal – third place	2018 Asaba	4×100 m
Summer Universiade
Gold medal – first place	2015 Gwangju	200 m
Bronze medal – third place	2013 Kazan	100 m

Hua Wilfried Serge Koffi (born 12 October 1987) is an Ivorian athlete specializing in sprinting events. He won the bronze medal at the 2013 and the gold at the 2015 Summer Universiade in addition to multiple medals on the continental level.

== Competition record ==
Year	Competition	Venue	Position	Event	Notes
Representing Ivory Coast
2009	Jeux de la Francophonie	Beirut, Lebanon	12th (sf)	100 m	10.52
2009	Jeux de la Francophonie	Beirut, Lebanon	7th	200 m	21.31
2009	Jeux de la Francophonie	Beirut, Lebanon	4th	4 × 100 m relay	39.91
2010	African Championships	Nairobi, Kenya	19th (h)	100 m	10.60
2010	African Championships	Nairobi, Kenya	23rd (h)	200 m	21.52
2010	African Championships	Nairobi, Kenya	6th	4 × 100 m relay	40.77
2011	Universiade	Shenzhen, China	15th (sf)	100 m	10.50
2011	Universiade	Shenzhen, China	7th	200 m	21.02
2011	All-Africa Games	Maputo, Mozambique	14th (sf)	100 m	10.38
2011	All-Africa Games	Maputo, Mozambique	22nd (sf)	200 m	31.52
2012	African Championships	Porto-Novo, Benin	3rd	100 m	10.37
2012	African Championships	Porto-Novo, Benin	4th	4 × 100 m relay	40.10
2013	Universiade	Kazan, Russia	3rd	100 m	10.21
2013	Universiade	Kazan, Russia	6th	200 m	20.73
2014	African Championships	Marrakesh, Morocco	1st	100 m	10.05
2014	African Championships	Marrakesh, Morocco	1st	200 m	20.25
2015	Universiade	Gwangju, South Korea	1st	200 m	20.41
2015	World Championships	Beijing, China	35th (h)	100 m	10.29
2015	World Championships	Beijing, China	24th (h)	200 m	20.39
2015	African Games	Brazzaville, Republic of the Congo	3rd	100 m	10.23
2015	African Games	Brazzaville, Republic of the Congo	1st	200 m	20.42
2015	African Games	Brazzaville, Republic of the Congo	1st	4 × 100 m relay	38.93
2016	World Indoor Championships	Portland, United States	14th (sf)	60 m	6.63
2016	African Championships	Durban, South Africa	6th	200 m	20.92
2016	African Championships	Durban, South Africa	2nd	4 × 100 m relay	38.98
2016	Olympic Games	Rio de Janeiro, Brazil	51st (h)	100 m	10.37
2016	Olympic Games	Rio de Janeiro, Brazil	29th (h)	200 m	20.48
2017	Jeux de la Francophonie	Abidjan, Ivory Coast	1st	200 m	20.73
2017	Jeux de la Francophonie	Abidjan, Ivory Coast	1st	4 × 100 m relay	39.39
2017	World Championships	London, United Kingdom	23rd (sf)	200 m	20.80
2018	African Championships	Asaba, Nigeria	3rd	4 × 100 m relay	38.92

== Personal bests ==
Outdoor

- 100 metres – 10.01 (+1.1) (Tempe, AZ 2016)
- 200 metres – 20.25 (+0.8) (Marrakech 2014)

Indoor

- 60 metres – 6.62 (Flagstaff 2016)
- 200 metres – 20.99 (Nanjing 2014)
