= Ben Youssef Meïté =

Ivorian sprinter (born 1986)

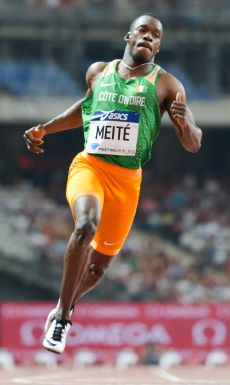

Personal information
- Born: November 11, 1986 (age 39) Séguéla, Ivory Coast
- Height: 1.80 m (5 ft 11 in)
- Weight: 84 kg (185 lb)

Sport
- Country: Ivory Coast
- Sport: Athletics
- Events: 100 metres 200 metres
Medal record
Men's athletics
Representing Ivory Coast
All-Africa Games
Gold medal – first place	2015 Brazzaville	100 m
Gold medal – first place	2015 Brazzaville	4×100 m relay
Silver medal – second place	2011 Maputo	100 m
Silver medal – second place	2011 Maputo	200 m
African Championships
Gold medal – first place	2010 Nairobi	100 m
Gold medal – first place	2012 Porto-Novo	200 m
Gold medal – first place	2016 Durban	100 m
Silver medal – second place	2010 Nairobi	200 m
Silver medal – second place	2016 Durban	4×100 m
Bronze medal – third place	2018 Asaba	4×100 m
- Updated on 17 September 2015

Ben Youssef Meïté (born November 11, 1986) is an Ivorian sprinter. He competed at the 2010 African Championships in Nairobi and won the gold medal with a time of 10.08 seconds. He went on to compete in the 2016 Summer Olympics in Rio de Janeiro, Brazil, where he finished sixth in the 100 meter dash with a personal best and national record of 9.96. He also won African Championship golds in the 200 m and the 100 m in 2012 and 2016, respectively.

== Competition record ==
Year	Competition	Venue	Position	Event	Notes
Representing the Ivory Coast
2003	All-Africa Games	Abuja, Nigeria	7th	4 × 100 m relay	40.81
2004	African Championships	Brazzaville, Republic of the Congo	20th (h)	200 m	22.18
2005	Islamic Solidarity Games	Mecca, Saudi Arabia	7th	100 m	10.63
2005	Islamic Solidarity Games	Mecca, Saudi Arabia	3rd	4 × 100 m relay	40.87
2005	Jeux de la Francophonie	Niamey, Niger	6th	100 m	10.64
2005	Jeux de la Francophonie	Niamey, Niger	1st	200 m	20.99
2005	Jeux de la Francophonie	Niamey, Niger	1st	4 × 100 m relay	39.79
2007	All-Africa Games	Algiers, Algeria	13th (sf)	100 m	10.52
2007	All-Africa Games	Algiers, Algeria	10th (sf)	200 m	21.18
2007	All-Africa Games	Algiers, Algeria	–	4 × 100 m relay	DQ
2009	World Championships	Berlin, Germany	37th (h)	100 m	10.41
2009	World Championships	Berlin, Germany	20th (qf)	200 m	20.78
2009	Jeux de la Francophonie	Beirut, Lebanon	1st	100 m	10.15 (w)
2009	Jeux de la Francophonie	Beirut, Lebanon	1st	200 m	20.37
2009	Jeux de la Francophonie	Beirut, Lebanon	4th	4 × 100 m relay	39.91
2010	World Indoor Championships	Split, Croatia	21st	60 m	6.76
2010	African Championships	Nairobi, Kenya	1st	100 m	10.08
2010	African Championships	Nairobi, Kenya	2nd	200 m	20.39
2010	African Championships	Nairobi, Kenya	6th	4 × 100 m relay	40.77
2010	IAAF Continental Cup	Split, Croatia	3rd	200 m	20.51
2011	World Championships	Daegu, South Korea	28th (h)	100 m	10.45
2011	World Championships	Daegu, South Korea	33rd (h)	200 m	20.97
2011	All-Africa Games	Maputo, Mozambique	2nd	100 m	10.28
2011	All-Africa Games	Maputo, Mozambique	2nd	200 m	20.76
2012	World Indoor Championships	Istanbul, Turkey	10th (sf)	60 m	6.71
2012	African Championships	Porto-Novo, Benin	1st	200 m	20.62
2012	African Championships	Porto-Novo, Benin	4th	4 × 100 m relay	40.10
2012	Olympic Games	London, United Kingdom	16th (sf)	100 m	10.13
2015	World Championships	Beijing, China	18th (sf)	100 m	10.17
2015	African Games	Brazzaville, Republic of the Congo	1st	100 m	10.04
2015	African Games	Brazzaville, Republic of the Congo	1st	4 × 100 m relay	38.93
2016	African Championships	Durban, South Africa	1st	100 m	9.95 (w)
2016	African Championships	Durban, South Africa	2nd	4 × 100 m relay	38.98
2016	Olympic Games	Rio de Janeiro, Brazil	6th	100 m	9.96
2017	World Championships	London, United Kingdom	10th (sf)	100 m	10.12
2018	World Indoor Championships	Birmingham, United Kingdom	10th (sf)	60 m	6.59
2018	African Championships	Asaba, Nigeria	4th	100 m	10.36
2018	African Championships	Asaba, Nigeria	3rd	4 × 100 m relay	38.92

Olympic Games
Preceded by Amandine Allou Affoue	Flagbearer for Ivory Coast; London 2012	Succeeded by Murielle Ahouré
