= Shepherd Agbeko =

Ghanaian sprinter

International medals

Men's athletics

African Games
Bronze medal – third place	2015 Brazzaville	4x100 m relay

Shepherd Kofi Agbeko (born 11 October 1985) is a Ghanaian sprinter who specializes in the 200 metres.

He finished sixth at the 2011 All-Africa Games, and also reached the semi-final at the 2008 African Championships, the 2012 African Championships and the 2015 African Games

He also won a bronze medal in the 4 × 100 metres relay at the 2015 African Games.

His personal best times are 10.70 seconds in the 100 metres, achieved in May 2012 in Ouagadougou; and 20.92 seconds in the 200 metres, achieved in August 2011 in Kumasi.
