= Mosito Lehata =

Mosotho sprinter (born 1989)

Personal information
- Born: 8 April 1989 (age 37) Ha Moima, Maseru District, Lesotho
- Height: 1.74 m (5 ft 9 in)
- Weight: 73 kg (161 lb)

Sport
- Sport: Athletics
- Event: 200 metres
- Coached by: Stéphan Buckland
Medal record
Men's athletics
Representing Lesotho
African Championships
Silver medal – second place	2016 Durban	100 m

Mosito Lehata (born 8 April 1989) is a Mosotho athlete competing in sprinting events. He is the current holder of the Lesotho national record for the 100-meter at 10.11 seconds, and has won the national track championships on shorter tracks.

Has two daughters Lintle Stephanie Lehata and Karabo Jollie Lehata

== Career ==
He was eliminated in the first round of the men's 200 m event at the 2012 Summer Olympics. At the 200 m event at the 2013 World Championships in Athletics, he reached the semifinals. Lehata set a new national record in the 200 m at the 2014 Commonwealth Games, finishing in 4th.

At the 2016 Summer Olympics, Lehata competed in the 100 m and 200 m events. He finished 4th in his heat for the 100 m with a time of 10.25 seconds and did not qualify for the semifinals. He finished 7th in his heat for the 200 m with a season best time of 20.65 seconds, but did not qualify for the semifinals. He was the flagbearer for Lesotho during the Parade of Nations.

=== Anti-doping ban ===
In 2021, Lehata received a five year competition ban for two anti-doping rule violations after testing positive salbutamol and attempting to tamper with the doping control process.

== Competition record ==
Year	Competition	Venue	Position	Event	Notes
Representing Lesotho
2008	World Junior Championships	Bydgoszcz, Poland	53rd (h)	100 m	11.09
2010	Commonwealth Games	Delhi, India	25th (qf)	100 m	10.63
2010	Commonwealth Games	Delhi, India	8th	200 m	21.13
2011	World Championships	Daegu, South Korea	36th (h)	200 m	21.03 (Note: Did not start in the semifinals)
2011	All-Africa Games	Maputo, Mozambique	19th (sf)	200 m	21.91
2012	World Indoor Championships	Istanbul, Turkey	28th (h)	60 m	7.00
2012	African Championships	Porto-Novo, Benin	5th	100 m	10.40
2012	African Championships	Porto-Novo, Benin	7th	200 m	21.11
2012	Olympic Games	London, United Kingdom	36th (h)	200 m	20.74
2013	World Championships	Moscow, Russia	23rd (sf)	200 m	20.68
2014	Commonwealth Games	Glasgow, United Kingdom	4th	200 m	20.36
2014	African Championships	Marrakesh, Morocco	8th (h)	200 m	20.94 (Note: Disqualified in the semifinals)
2015	World Championships	Beijing, China	48th (h)	200 m	21.43
2015	African Games	Brazzaville, Republic of the Congo	8th	100 m	10.56
2016	African Championships	Durban, South Africa	2nd	100 m	10.04 (w)
2016	Olympic Games	Rio de Janeiro, Brazil	32nd (h)	100 m	10.25
2016	Olympic Games	Rio de Janeiro, Brazil	49th (h)	200 m	20.65
2017	World Championships	London, United Kingdom	-	100 m	DQ
2018	Commonwealth Games	Gold Coast, Australia	27th (sf)	100 m	10.50 (Note: Did not finish in the semifinals)
2019	African Games	Rabat, Morocco	11th (sf)	100 m	10.44
2019	African Games	Rabat, Morocco	10th (sf)	200 m	20.87

== Personal bests ==
Outdoor

- 100 metres – 10.11 (+1.4 m/s, Réduit 2015)
- 200 metres – 20.36 (+0.5 m/s, Glasgow 2014)

Indoor

- 60 metres – 7.00 (Istanbul 2012)

Olympic Games
Preceded by Mamorallo Tjoka	Flagbearer for Lesotho; 2016 Rio de Janeiro	Succeeded by None
