= Ismail Kamara =

Sierra Leonean sprinter

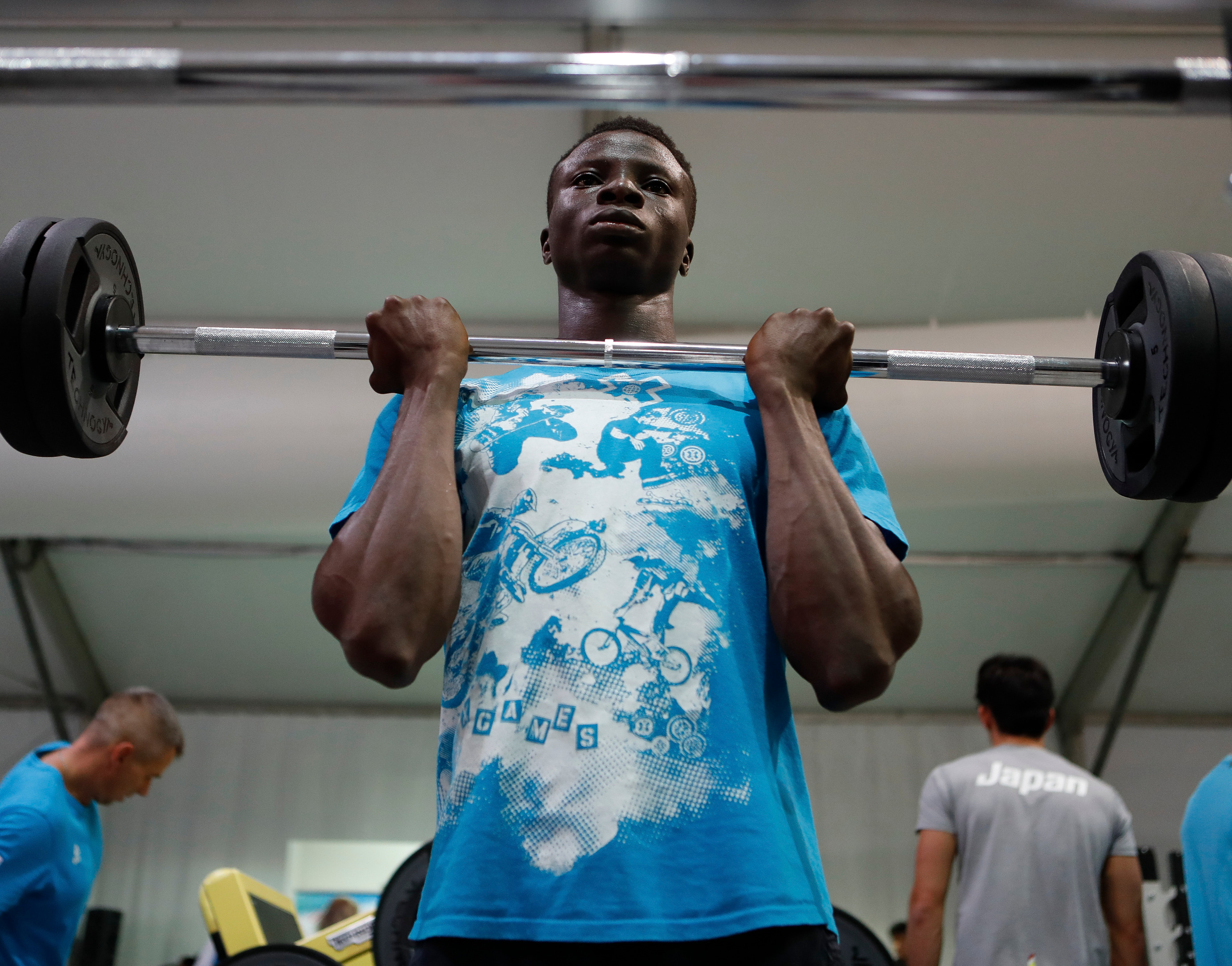
- Kamara at the 2016 Olympics

Personal information
- Born: 14 February 1997 (age 29)

Sport
- Sport: Athletics
- Event: 100 m
- Coached by: Joseph Lahai

Achievements and titles
- Personal best: 10.77 (2015)

Ismail Kamara (born 14 February 1997) is a Sierra Leonean sprinter. He competed at the 2016 Summer Olympics in the 100 metres race; his time of 10.95 seconds in the preliminary round did not qualify him for the first round.
