= Jesse Urikhob =

Namibian sprinter

Personal information
- Born: 19 March 1991 (age 35)
- Education: International University of Management
- Height: 1.75 m (5 ft 9 in)
- Weight: 76 kg (168 lb)

Sport
- Sport: Track and field
- Event(s): 100 metres, 200 metres
Medal record
Men's Athletics
Representing Namibia
African Games
| Silver medal – second place | 2015 Brazzaville | 4x100 m relay |

Jesse Urikhob (born 19 March 1991) is a Namibian athlete specialising in the sprinting events. He won a silver medal in the 4 × 100 metres relay at the 2015 African Games.

His personal bests are 10.42 in the 100 metres (+2.0 m/s, Maputo 2011) and 20.85 in the 200 metres (+0.9 m/s, Kingston 2015).

== Competition record ==
| Year | Competition | Venue | Position | Event | Notes |
Representing Namibia
| 2010 | African Championships | Nairobi, Kenya | 22nd (sf) | 100 m | 10.78 |
| 2010 | African Championships | Nairobi, Kenya | 28th (h) | 200 m | 21.64 |
| 2011 | Universiade | Shenzhen, China | 30th (qf) | 100 m | 10.70 |
| 2011 | Universiade | Shenzhen, China | 16th (sf) | 200 m | 21.39 |
| 2011 | Universiade | Shenzhen, China | 13th (h) | 4 × 100 m relay | 41.51 |
| 2011 | All-Africa Games | Maputo, Mozambique | 17th (sf) | 100 m | 10.42 |
| 2011 | All-Africa Games | Maputo, Mozambique | 10th (sf) | 200 m | 21.54 |
| 2013 | Universiade | Kazan, Russia | 35th (h) | 100 m | 10.95 |
| 2013 | Universiade | Kazan, Russia | 21st (qf) | 200 m | 21.59 |
| 2015 | IAAF World Relays | Nassau, Bahamas | – | 4 × 200 m relay | DQ |
| 2015 | African Games | Brazzaville, Republic of the Congo | 14th (sf) | 100 m | 10.49 |
| 2015 | African Games | Brazzaville, Republic of the Congo | 12th (sf) | 200 m | 21.05 |
| 2015 | African Games | Brazzaville, Republic of the Congo | 2nd | 4 × 100 m relay | 39.22 |
