= Idrissa Adam =

Cameroonian sprinter (born 1984)

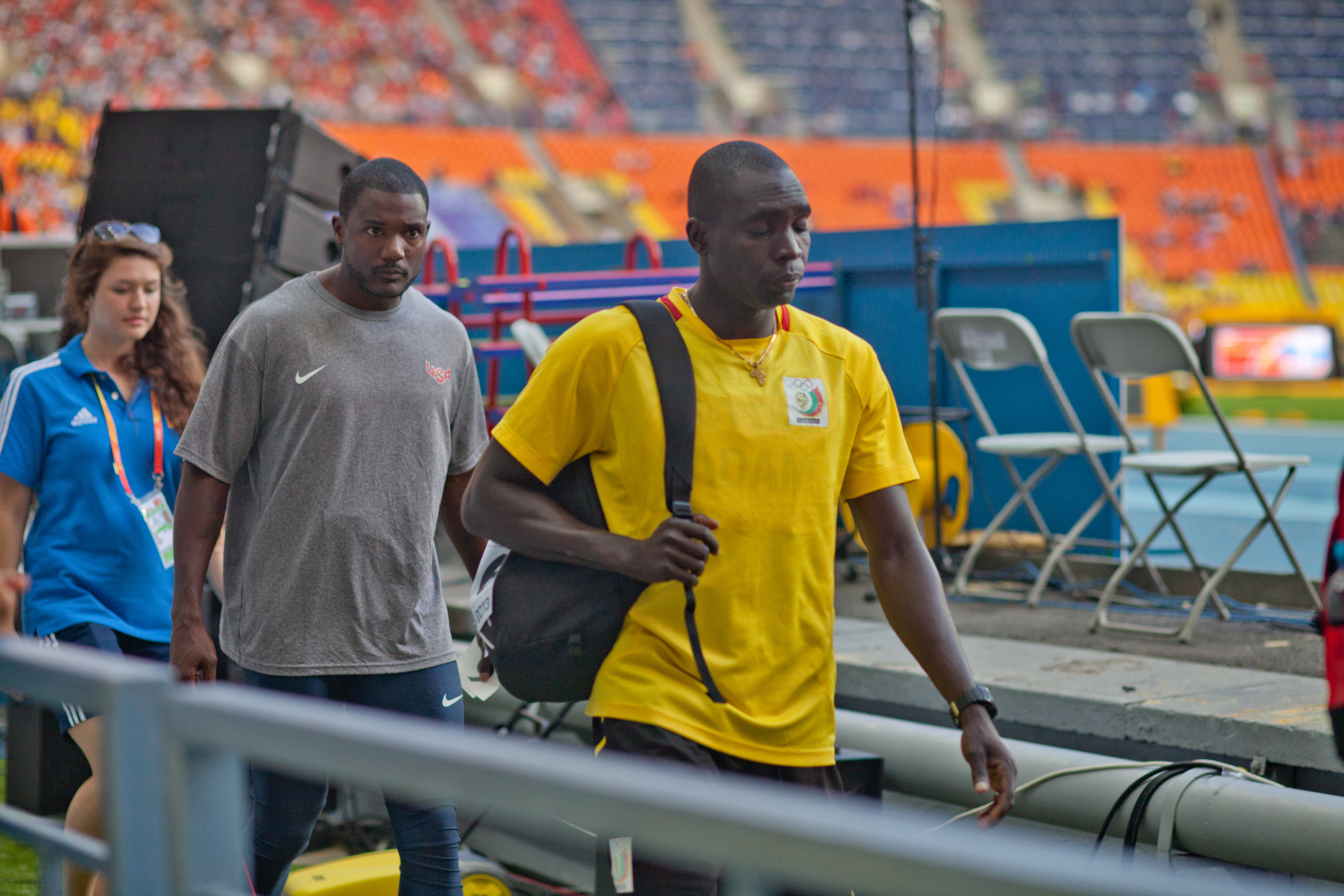
- Adam at the 2013 World Championships

Medal record

Men's athletics

Representing Cameroon

All-Africa Games
Gold medal – first place	2011 Maputo	200 m

African Championships
Bronze medal – third place	2004 Brazzaville	4×100 m
Bronze medal – third place	2008 Addis Ababa	4×100 m

Idrissa Adam (born 28 December 1984) is a Cameroonian sprinter who competes in the 100 metres and 200 metres.

His first international outing came at the African Junior Athletics Championships in 2003, where he was fifth in the 100 m final. He won his first continental level medal the following year, taking the bronze medal in the 4×100 metres relay at the 2004 African Championships in Athletics in a team including Joseph Batangdon. It was another four years before he won another major medal: at the 2008 African Championships he and Batangdon again claimed the relay bronze for Cameroon. He came fourth in that event at the 2009 Jeux de la Francophonie.

He represented Cameroon in the 100 and 200 m at both the 2010 African Championships in Athletics and the 2010 Commonwealth Games, but did not progress beyond the early rounds. He established himself as an individual runner at the 2011 All-Africa Games, where he ran a Cameroonian record of 10.14 seconds in the 100 m semi-finals (later finishing sixth) and was the surprise winner of the 200 m gold medal ahead of Ben Youssef Meité.
