= Sibusiso Matsenjwa =

Swazi sprinter (born 1988)

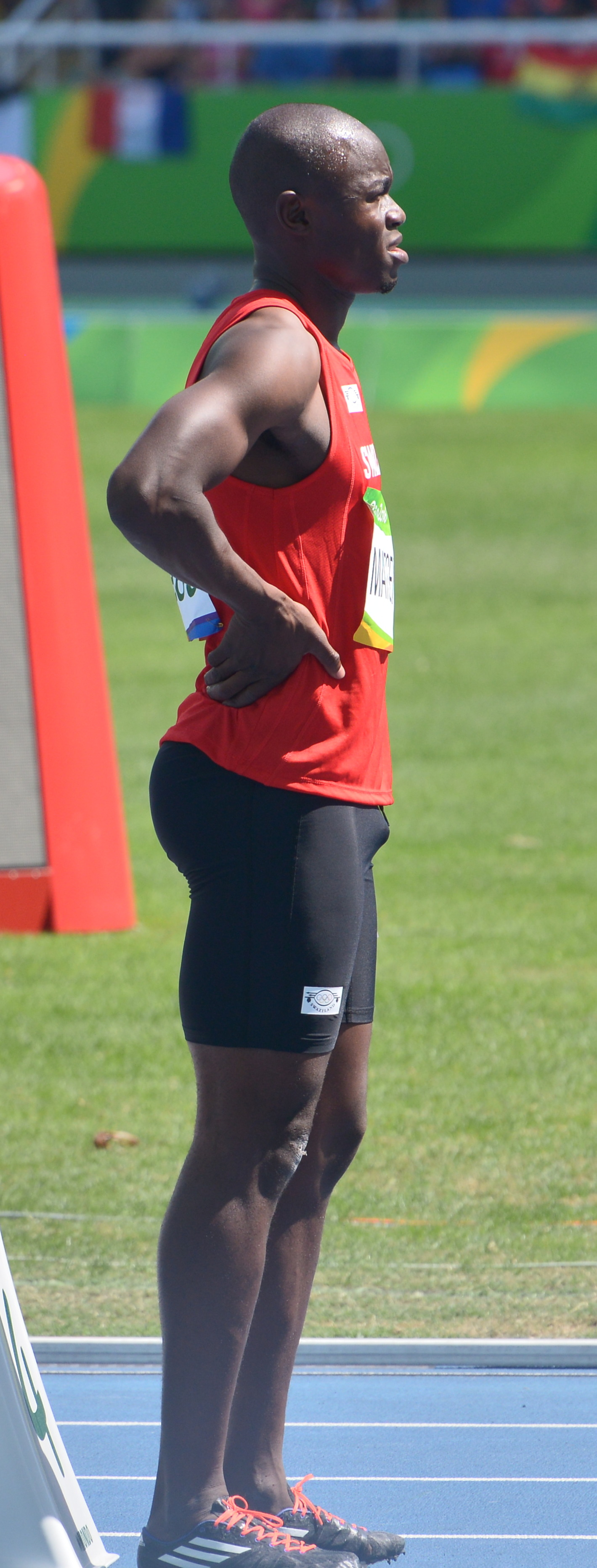
- Matsenjwa at the 2016 Olympics

Personal information
- Born: 2 May 1988 (age 38) Siteki, Eswatini
- Education: Gwamile Vocational and Commercial Training Institute; Polytechnic University of the Philippines
- Height: 1.80 m (5 ft 11 in)
- Weight: 82 kg (181 lb)

Sport
- Sport: Athletics
- Events: 100 m, 200 m
- Club: Royal Swaziland Police
- Coached by: Muzi Mabuza

Sibusiso Bruno Matsenjwa (born 2 May 1988) is a Swazi sprinter. He competed in the 200 metres at the 2012 and 2016 Olympics, but failed to reach the finals. He broke the national record on both occasions and served as the flag bearer for Eswatini during the opening ceremony in 2016. Matsenjwa holds national records over 100–400 m distances. He represented his country at three outdoor and three indoor world championships. Sibusiso also competed at the 2018 Gold Coast Commonwealth Games.

He competed in the men's 200m at the 2020 Summer Olympics.

== Competition record ==
Year	Competition	Venue	Position	Event	Notes
Representing Eswatini
2009	World Championships	Berlin, Germany	55th (h)	200 m	21.93
2010	World Indoor Championships	Doha, Qatar	45th (h)	60 m	7.39
2011	World Championships	Daegu, South Korea	47th (h)	200 m	21.29
2011	All-Africa Games	Maputo, Mozambique	18th (sf)	100 m	10.43
2011	All-Africa Games	Maputo, Mozambique	7th	200 m	21.08
2012	World Indoor Championships	Istanbul, Turkey	31st (h)	60 m	7.04
2012	African Championships	Porto-Novo, Benin	30th (h)	100 m	10.91
2012	African Championships	Porto-Novo, Benin	16th (h)	200 m	21.21
2012	Olympic Games	London, United Kingdom	40th (h)	200 m	20.93
2013	Universiade	Kazan, Russia	16th (qf)	100 m	10.53
2013	Universiade	Kazan, Russia	8th	200 m	20.99
2014	World Indoor Championships	Sopot, Poland	34th (h)	60 m	6.88
2014	Commonwealth Games	Glasgow, United Kingdom	33rd (h)	100 m	10.56
2014	Commonwealth Games	Glasgow, United Kingdom	29th (h)	200 m	21.08
2014	African Championships	Marrakesh, Morocco	21st (sf)	100 m	10.80
2015	World Championships	Beijing, China	41st (h)	200 m	20.78
2015	African Games	Brazzaville, Republic of the Congo	13th (sf)	100 m	10.46
2015	African Games	Brazzaville, Republic of the Congo	6th	200 m	20.93
2016	World Indoor Championships	Portland, United States	44th (h)	60 m	6.95
2016	African Championships	Durban, South Africa	7th (h)	200 m	21.08^{1}
2016	Olympic Games	Rio de Janeiro, Brazil	47th (h)	200 m	20.63
2017	World Championships	London, United Kingdom	32nd (h)	200 m	20.67
2018	World Indoor Championships	Birmingham, United Kingdom	30th (h)	60 m	6.82
2018	Commonwealth Games	Gold Coast, Australia	16th (sf)	100 m	10.37
2018	Commonwealth Games	Gold Coast, Australia	19th (sf)	200 m	21.16
2018	African Championships	Asaba, Nigeria	11th (sf)	200 m	21.07
2019	African Games	Rabat, Morocco	13th (sf)	100 m	10.31
2019	African Games	Rabat, Morocco	5th	200 m	20.83
2019	World Championships	Doha, Qatar	40th (h)	200 m	20.85
2021	Olympic Games	Tokyo, Japan	11th (sf)	200 m	20.22
2022	African Championships	Port Louis, Mauritius	18th (sf)	100 m	10.41
2022	African Championships	Port Louis, Mauritius	25th (h)	200 m	21.08
2022	African Championships	Port Louis, Mauritius	7th (h)	4 × 100 m relay	41.25
2022	World Championships	Eugene, United States	29th (h)	200 m	20.60
2023	World Championships	Budapest, Hungary	37th (h)	200 m	20.88
2024	World Indoor Championships	Glasgow, United Kingdom	30th (h)	60 m	6.74
2024	African Games	Accra, Ghana	5th	200 m	21.12
2024	African Championships	Douala, Cameroon	22nd (sf)	100 m	10.66
2024	African Championships	Douala, Cameroon	5th	200 m	20.95
2024	African Championships	Douala, Cameroon	4th (h)	4 × 100 m relay	39.82
2024	Olympic Games	Paris, France	55th (h)	100 m	10.39

^{1}Disqualified in the semifinals

== Personal bests ==
Outdoor

- 100 metres – 10.22 (+0.3 m/s, Réduit 2018, NR)
- 200 metres – 20.22 (+0.2 m/s, Tokyo 2021, NR)
- 400 metres – 46.79 (Pretoria 2018)

Indoor

- 60 metres – 6.74 (Glasgow 2024)

Olympic Games
Preceded by Luke Hall	Flag bearer for Eswatini; 2016 Rio	Succeeded by Thabiso Dlamini; Robyn Young
