= Athletics at the 2017 Jeux de la Francophonie – Results =

These are the official results of the athletics competition at the 2017 Jeux de la Francophonie which took place at the Stade Félix Houphouët-Boigny between 23 and 27 July 2017 in Abidjan, Ivory Coast.

== Men's results ==
=== 100 metres ===
Heats – 23 July
Wind:
Heat 1: +0.9 m/s, Heat 2: +0.3 m/s, Heat 3: -0.4 m/s

Rank	Heat	Name	Nationality	Time	Notes
1	3	Arthur Gue Cissé	Ivory Coast	10.22	Q
2	1	Dylan Sicobo	Seychelles	10.33	Q, NR
3	2	Bismark Boateng	Canada	10.43	Q
4	2	Émilien Aurele Tchan Bi Chan	Ivory Coast	10.46	Q
5	1	Benjamin Williams	Canada	10.47	Q
6	2	Kokoutse Fabrice Dabla	Togo	10.48	q
7	3	Petre Rezmives	Romania	10.50	Q
8	1	Jean-Yan Degrace	Mauritius	10.53	q
9	3	Elie Jonathan Bardottier	Mauritius	10.54	
10	1	Likembe Molango	Canada	10.56	
11	2	Sylvain Chuard	Switzerland	10.61	
12	2	Jean Daniel Lozereau	Mauritius	10.69	
13	1	Guy Maganga Gorra	Gabon	10.69	
14	2	Gérard Kobéane	Burkina Faso	10.70	
15	1	Gogbeu Francis Koné	Ivory Coast	10.76	
16	3	Sharry Dodin	Seychelles	10.77	
17	3	Eskilson Nascimento	Cape Verde	10.81	
18	2	Rossen Mpingo Kasongo	DR Congo	10.88	
19	1	Tommy Harold Tadahy	Madagascar	10.95	
20	3	Mahmoud Daou	Lebanon	11.14	
21	3	Moulaye Sonko	Senegal	42.92	

Final – 24 July
Wind:
+0.1 m/s

Rank	Lane	Name	Nationality	Time	Notes
1st place, gold medalist(s)	5	Dylan Sicobo	Seychelles	10.33	=NR
2nd place, silver medalist(s)	4	Arthur Gue Cissé	Ivory Coast	10.34	
3rd place, bronze medalist(s)	3	Bismark Boateng	Canada	10.41	
4	7	Petre Rezmives	Romania	10.46	
5	6	Émilien Aurele Tchan Bi Chan	Ivory Coast	10.53	
6	2	Kokoutse Fabrice Dabla	Togo	10.56	
7	1	Jean-Yan Degrace	Mauritius	10.58	
8	8	Benjamin Williams	Canada	10.58	

=== 200 metres ===
Heats – 26 July
Wind:
Heat 1: -1.7 m/s, Heat 2: -1.7 m/s, Heat 3: -2.2 m/s

Rank	Heat	Name	Nationality	Time	Notes
1	3	Arthur Gue Cissé	Ivory Coast	21.02	Q
2	3	Bastien Mouthon	Switzerland	21.20	Q
3	1	Hua Wilfried Koffi	Ivory Coast	21.21	Q
4	2	Petre Rezmives	Romania	21.27	Q
5	2	Ousmane Ismael Diop	Senegal	21.29	Q
6	2	Émilien Aurele Tchan Bi Chan	Ivory Coast	21.33	q
7	2	Benjamin Williams	Canada	21.37	q
8	1	Kokoutse Fabrice Dabla	Togo	21.39	Q
9	2	Guy Maganga Gorra	Gabon	21.41	
10	3	Eskilson Nascimento	Cape Verde	21.65	NR
11	3	Lucanus Robinson	Canada	21.66	
12	1	Likembe Molango	Canada	21.75	
13	3	Henry Bandiaky	Senegal	21.88	
14	2	Elie Jonathan Bardottier	Mauritius	21.89	
15	2	Mahmoud Daou	Lebanon	22.02	
16	1	Al Bein Ben Abbo	Chad	22.57	
17	3	Adechina Aminou	Togo	22.96	
18	1	Joplin Legrand Djalla	Central African Republic	23.19	
	3	Gange Bertrand Etemabeka	Congo	DNF	
	1	Gérard Kobéané	Burkina Faso	DQ	R162.6
	1	Dylan Sicobo	Seychelles	DNS	

Final – 27 July
Wind:
-1.0 m/s

Rank	Lane	Name	Nationality	Time	Notes
1st place, gold medalist(s)	4	Hua Wilfried Koffi	Ivory Coast	20.73	
2nd place, silver medalist(s)	5	Arthur Gue Cissé	Ivory Coast	20.93	SB
3rd place, bronze medalist(s)	3	Bastien Mouthon	Switzerland	21.20	
4	7	Ousmane Ismael Diop	Senegal	21.28	
5	6	Petre Rezmives	Romania	21.29	
6	8	Kokoutse Fabrice Dabla	Togo	21.34	
7	1	Émilien Aurele Tchan Bi Chan	Ivory Coast	21.43	
8	2	Benjamin Williams	Canada	21.43	

=== 400 metres ===
Heats – 25 July

Rank	Heat	Name	Nationality	Time	Notes
1	2	Benjamin Ayesu-Attah	Canada	46.89	Q
2	2	Bienvenu Sawadogo	Burkina Faso	47.13	Q
3	2	Ibrahima Mbengue	Senegal	47.19	Q, SB
4	2	Mahmat Ahmat Bachir	Chad	47.21	q, SB
5	1	Orwin Emilien	Mauritius	47.85	Q
6	2	Tigran Mkrtchyan	Armenia	48.36	q
7	2	Todisoa Rabearison	Madagascar	48.41	
8	1	Daniel Kelloway	Canada	48.55	Q
9	1	Rayshaun Franklin	Canada	48.55	Q
10	1	Tidiane Minougou	Burkina Faso	49.19	
11	1	Ezekiel Kra Kouakou	Ivory Coast	49.24	
12	2	Arthur Epsilon Boali	Ivory Coast	49.90	
13	1	Daniel Gopre Gahourou	Ivory Coast	50.40	
14	1	Facinet Bangoura	Guinea	51.70	
	2	Adechina Aminou	Togo	DNS	

Final – 26 July

Rank	Lane	Name	Nationality	Time	Notes
1st place, gold medalist(s)	4	Benjamin Ayesu-Attah	Canada	46.43	
2nd place, silver medalist(s)	3	Bienvenu Sawadogo	Burkina Faso	46.89	NR
3rd place, bronze medalist(s)	8	Ibrahima Mbengue	Senegal	47.10	SB
4	5	Orwin Emilien	Mauritius	47.20	
5	2	Mahmat Ahmat Bachir	Chad	47.97	
6	6	Daniel Kelloway	Canada	48.16	
7	7	Rayshaun Franklin	Canada	48.70	
8	1	Tigran Mkrtchyan	Armenia	48.72	

=== 800 metres ===
Heats – 23 July

Rank	Heat	Name	Nationality	Time	Notes
1	2	Mostafa Smaili	Morocco	1:48.48	Q
2	2	Riadh Chninni	Tunisia	1:49.59	Q
3	2	Astrit Kryeziu	Kosovo	1:49.74	Q, SB
4	2	Corey Bellemore	Canada	1:50.16	q
5	2	Brendon Restall	Canada	1:51.78	q
6	1	Oussama Nabil	Morocco	1:54.01	Q
7	2	Moussa Zaroumeye	Niger	1:55.33	
8	1	Alexander Ullman	Canada	1:55.42	Q
9	1	Valentin Voicu	Romania	1:55.67	Q
10	1	Abakar Haroun Oumar	Chad	1:58.90	SB
11	2	Mzembaba Elarif	Comoros	2:25.08	
	1	Tigran Mkrtchyan	Armenia	DNS	
	1	Abdelati El Guesse	Morocco	DNS	
	1	Samorn Kieng	Cambodia	DNS	
	1	Brice Etès	Monaco	DNS	
	2	Eric Nzikwinkunda	Burundi	DNS	

Final – 24 July

Rank	Name	Nationality	Time	Notes
1st place, gold medalist(s)	Oussama Nabil	Morocco	1:46.14	SB
2nd place, silver medalist(s)	Mostafa Smaili	Morocco	1:46.73	
3rd place, bronze medalist(s)	Riadh Chninni	Tunisia	1:47.39	
4	Astrit Kryeziu	Kosovo	1:48.67	SB
5	Corey Bellemore	Canada	1:49.91	
6	Alexander Ullman	Canada	1:51.52	
7	Brendon Restall	Canada	1:51.80	
8	Valentin Voicu	Romania	2:01.90	

=== 1500 metres ===
Heats – 25 July

Rank	Heat	Name	Nationality	Time	Notes
1	2	Hicham Ouladha	Morocco	3:51.39	Q
2	2	Brahim Kaazouzi	Morocco	3:51.57	Q
3	2	Nicholas Falk	Canada	3:52.75	Q
4	2	Hassan Mahdi Djama	Djibouti	3:53.06	Q
5	2	Mohammad Dookun	Mauritius	3:54.88	q
6	1	Fouad Elkaam	Morocco	3:54.96	Q
7	2	Bob Bertemes	Luxembourg	3:55.43	q
8	1	Alex Ngouari Mouissi	Congo	3:55.60	Q
9	1	Martin Casse	France	3:55.75	Q
10	2	Donne Efanomezantsoa	Madagascar	3:56.10	q
11	1	Musa Hajdari	Kosovo	3:56.29	Q
12	1	Jean-Samuel Lapointe	Quebec	3:56.96	q
13	1	Nicolas Morin	Quebec	3:58.04	
14	1	Yervand Mkrtchyan	Armenia	3:58.58	
15	1	Justin Kent	Canada	3:58.63	
16	2	Marc-André Raiche	Quebec	3:58.70	
17	1	Andrea Baratte	Luxembourg	3:59.03	
18	2	Aimé Yelity Yeguelet	Central African Republic	4:02.94	
19	2	Bachir Moutari	Niger	4:03.18	
20	2	Samorn Kieng	Cambodia	4:03.66	
	1	Mohamed Ismail Ibrahim	Djibouti	DNS	
	1	Riadh Chninni	Tunisia	DNS	
	2	Youssouf Hiss Bachir	Djibouti	DNS	

Final – 27 July

Rank	Name	Nationality	Time	Notes
1st place, gold medalist(s)	Fouad Elkaam	Morocco	3:46.42	
2nd place, silver medalist(s)	Brahim Kaazouzi	Morocco	3:47.13	
3rd place, bronze medalist(s)	Hicham Ouladha	Morocco	3:48.14	
4	Martin Casse	France	3:51.13	
5	Alex Ngouari Mouissi	Congo	3:52.05	
6	Musa Hajdari	Kosovo	3:52.93	
7	Jean-Samuel Lapointe	Quebec	3:53.47	
8	Nicholas Falk	Canada	3:53.80	
9	Mohammad Dookun	Mauritius	3:56.49	
10	Bob Bertemes	Luxembourg	3:57.12	
11	Hassan Mahdi Djama	Djibouti	3:58.12	
12	Donne Efanomezantsoa	Madagascar	4:02.72	

=== 5000 metres ===
27 July

Rank	Name	Nationality	Time	Notes
1st place, gold medalist(s)	Younès Essalhi	Morocco	14:11.60	
2nd place, silver medalist(s)	Soufiyan Bouqantar	Morocco	14:11.62	
3rd place, bronze medalist(s)	Youssouf Hiss Bachir	Djibouti	14:11.98	
4	Jamal Hitrane	Morocco	14:12.22	
5	François Barrer	France	14:12.91	
6	Yves Sikubwabo	Canada	14:23.14	
7	Felix Bour	France	14:26.42	
8	Barry Britt	New Brunswick	14:28.33	
9	Ahmat Abdou Daouad	Chad	14:29.89	SB
10	Ibrahim Hassan Bouh	Djibouti	14:32.21	
11	Thomas Coughler	Canada	14:35.17	
12	Mike Tate	Canada	14:43.06	
13	Makorobondo Salukombo	DR Congo	14:46.17	
14	Soumaila Traore	Ivory Coast	14:48.19	SB
	Yervand Mkrtchyan	Armenia	DNF	
	Alex Ngouari Mouissi	Congo	DNS	
	Andraino Semedo	Cape Verde	DNS	

=== 10,000 metres ===
23 July

Rank	Name	Nationality	Time	Notes
1st place, gold medalist(s)	Soufiyan Bouqantar	Morocco	29:39.07	
2nd place, silver medalist(s)	Jamal Hitrane	Morocco	29:40.25	
3rd place, bronze medalist(s)	Mohamed Reda El Aaraby	Morocco	29:42.12	
4	Arsène Guillorel	France	29:42.55	
5	Ibrahim Hassan Bouh	Djibouti	29:54.94	
6	Kevin Tree	Canada	30:06.75	
7	Ahmat Abdou Daouad	Chad	30:16.43	SB
8	Soumaila Traoré	Ivory Coast	31:37.23	
9	Anthony Larouche	Quebec	32:08.03	

=== Marathon ===
23 July

Rank	Name	Nationality	Time	Notes
1st place, gold medalist(s)	Makorobondo Salukombo	DR Congo	2:27:54	SB
2nd place, silver medalist(s)	Abdenasir Fatihi	Morocco	2:28:06	
3rd place, bronze medalist(s)	Daouda Korongou	Benin	2:41:16	
4	Thierry Serge Yao Kouamé	Ivory Coast	2:51:44	
5	Boris Konan Kouakou	Ivory Coast	3:07:28	
	Siaka Fofana	Ivory Coast	DNF	
	Athoumani Ismael	Comoros	DNF	
	Fouad Fakri	Comoros	DNF	
	Adam Tamari	Niger	DNF	

=== 110 metres hurdles ===
25 July
Wind: +1.5 m/s

Rank	Lane	Name	Nationality	Time	Notes
1st place, gold medalist(s)	5	Loïc Herkenrath	France	13.74	
2nd place, silver medalist(s)	6	Sekou Kaba	Canada	13.81	
3rd place, bronze medalist(s)	8	Nicolas Borome	France	13.94	
4	4	Brian Richards	Canada	14.09	
5	2	Cosmin Dumitrache	Romania	14.32	
6	3	Ahmad Hazer	Lebanon	14.63	
7	7	Anousone Xaysa	Laos	14.75	
8	1	Florian Tinsa Somé	Burkina Faso	14.88	

=== 400 metres hurdles ===
24 July

Rank	Lane	Name	Nationality	Time	Notes
1st place, gold medalist(s)	8	Jordin Andrade	Cape Verde	49.66	
2nd place, silver medalist(s)	6	Amadou Ndiaye	Senegal	50.17	
3rd place, bronze medalist(s)	3	Thomas Delmestre	France	50.66	SB
4	5	Mickaël François	France	51.03	
5	7	Ned Azemia	Seychelles	51.35	
6	1	Pierrick Godefroy	France	51.36	
7	4	Oumar Babou	Senegal	53.11	
8	2	Esaii Somda	Burkina Faso	53.51	

=== 3000 metres steeplechase ===
24 July

Rank	Name	Nationality	Time	Notes
1st place, gold medalist(s)	Mohamed Tindouft	Morocco	8:44.69	
2nd place, silver medalist(s)	Hicham Sigueni	Morocco	8:45.27	
3rd place, bronze medalist(s)	Mohamed Amin Jhinaoui	Tunisia	8:53.76	
4	John Gay	Canada	8:55.41	
5	Ryan Brockerville	Canada	8:56.58	
6	Thomas Coughler	Canada	9:03.68	
7	Patrice Labonté	Quebec	9:15.44	
8	Hery Rakotoarimanana	Madagascar	9:15.49	SB
9	Nicolas Rakotoniaina	Madagascar	9:24.56	SB

=== 4 × 100 metres relay ===
25 July

Rank	Lane	Nation	Competitors	Time	Notes
1st place, gold medalist(s)	4	Ivory Coast	Francis Koné Gogbeu, Arthur Gue Cissé, Émilien Aurel Tchan Bi Chan, Hua Wilfried Koffi	39.39	
2nd place, silver medalist(s)	6	Canada	Lucanus Robinson, Likembe Molango, Bismark Boateng, Benjamin Williams	40.16	
3rd place, bronze medalist(s)	2	Seychelles	Sharry Dodin, Dylan Sicobo, Ned Azemia, Leeroy Henriette	40.31	NR
4	1	France	Nicolas Borome, Loïc Herkenrath, Pierrick Godefroy, Thomas Delmestre	40.44	
5	7	Senegal	Léon David Basse, Ousmane Ismael Diop, Henry Bandiaky, Mamadou Cissé Ndiaye	40.75	
6	3	Madagascar	Jaony Randrianarivo, Tommy Harold Tadahy, Stenny Randriatiana, Florent Ravelomanana	41.10	
7	8	Burkina Faso	Florian Tinsa Somé, Bienvenu Sawadogo, Sidiki Ouédraogo, Gérard Kobéané	41.21	
8	5	Lebanon	Ramzi Niam, Ahmad Hazer, Christophe Boulos, Mahmoud Daou	42.66	

=== 4 × 400 metres relay ===
Heats – 26 July

Rank	Heat	Nation	Competitors	Time	Notes
1	2	Switzerland	Daniele Angelella, Silvan Lutz, Vincent Notz, Joël Burgunder	3:11.41	Q
2	1	Canada	Brendon Restall, Corey Bellomore, Alexander Ullman, Benjamin Ayesu-Attah	3:15.73	Q
3	1	Madagascar	Todisoa Rabearison, Tahina Rakotoarivelo, Lucka Raherindrainy, Jean Robert Bezara	3:16.04	Q
4	2	France	Nicolas Borome, Mickaël François, Pierrick Godefroy, Thomas Delmestre	3:16.45	Q
5	2	Burkina Faso	Tidiane Minougou, Esaii Somda, Bienvenu Sawadogo, Gérard Kobéané	3:18.86	Q
6	1	Senegal	David Leon Basse, Oumar Babou, Mamadou Cissé Ndiaye, Ibrahima Mbengue	3:19.49	Q
7	2	Lebanon	Mohammed Mortadu, Mahmoud Daou, Ramzi Niam, Mohammed Hannauf	3:29.55	q
8	1	Chad	Zakaria Djarma, Abakar Haroun Oumar, Al Bein Ben Abbo, Mahmat Ahmat Bachir	3:37.25	q
	2	Ivory Coast	Bathye Erick Lion Kouame, Ezekiel Kra Kouakou, Daniel Si Gopre Gahourou, Kophi Alphonse Kouassi	DQ	R170.20
	1	Quebec		DNS	

Final – 27 July

Rank	Nation	Competitors	Time	Notes
1st place, gold medalist(s)	Switzerland	Bastien Mouthon, Joël Burgunder, Silvan Lutz, Daniele Angelella	3:10.70	
2nd place, silver medalist(s)	Senegal	David Leon Basse, Ibrahima Mbengue, Mamadou Cissé Ndiaye, Amadou Ndiaye	3:10.98	
3rd place, bronze medalist(s)	France	Loïc Herkenrath, Mickaël François, Pierrick Godefroy, Thomas Delmestre	3:12.23	
4	Canada	Daniel Kelloway, Corey Bellomore, Rayshaun Franklin, Benjamin Ayesu-Attah	3:14.29	
5	Madagascar	Todisoa Rabearison, Tahina Rakotoarivelo, Lucka Raherindrainy, Jean Robert Bezara	3:15.88	
6	Burkina Faso	Sidiki Ouédraogo, Tidiane Minougou, Esaii Somda, Gérard Kobéané	3:18.13	
7	Chad	Zakaria Djarma, Abakar Haroun Oumar, Al Bein Ben Abbo, Mahmat Ahmat Bachir	3:19.82	
8	Lebanon	Mohammed Hannauf, Christophe Boulos, Ramzi Niam, Mohammed Mortadu	3:29.14	

=== 20 kilometres walk ===
27 July

Rank	Name	Nationality	Time	Notes
1st place, gold medalist(s)	Antonin Boyez	France	1:30:44	
2nd place, silver medalist(s)	Andrei Gafita	Romania	1:35:12	
3rd place, bronze medalist(s)	Jérôme Caprice	Mauritius	1:39:06	

=== High jump ===
25 July

Rank	Name	Nationality	1.90	1.95	2.00	2.05	2.08	2.11	2.14	2.16	2.18	2.20	2.22	Result	Notes
1st place, gold medalist(s)	Sean Cate	Canada	–	–	o	xo	–	xxo	xxo	o	o	xo	xxx	2.20	
2nd place, silver medalist(s)	Fernand Djoumessi	Cameroon	–	–	–	–	–	o	o	o	o	xx–	x	2.18	
3rd place, bronze medalist(s)	Alhaji Mansaray	Canada	–	–	o	o	–	o	xxo	xxo	xxx			2.16	SB
4	Paul Galas	Canada	–	–	o	o	o	–	xxx					2.08	
5	Alexander Witmer	New Brunswick	–	o	o	xo	xxo	xxx						2.08	
6	Jean-Paul Masanga Mekombo	DR Congo	–	–	o	o	xxx							2.05	
7	Fabiano Kalandula	Wallonia	–	o	xo	o	xxx							2.05	

=== Pole vault ===
27 July

Rank	Name	Nationality	4.50	4.70	4.90	5.10	5.20	5.30	5.40	5.50	Result	Notes
1st place, gold medalist(s)	Baptiste Boirie	France	–	–	–	–	o	o	o	xxx	5.40	
2nd place, silver medalist(s)	Stanley Joseph	France	–	–	–	xo	–	xo	o	xxx	5.40	
3rd place, bronze medalist(s)	Deryk Theodore	Canada	–	–	–	xo	–	xo	xxx		5.30	SB
4	Mohamed Amine Romdhana	Tunisia	–	–	o	xo	xo	xx–	x		5.20	
5	Spencer Allen	Canada	–	–	xo	o	xxx				5.10	
6	Tristan Slater	Canada	o	o	o	xxx					4.90	
7	David Foley	Quebec	–	o	xxo	xxx					4.90	
8	Joe Seil	Luxembourg	o	xo	xxx						4.70	

=== Long jump ===
27 July

Rank	Name	Nationality	#1	#2	#3	#4	#5	#6	Result	Notes
1st place, gold medalist(s)	Raihau Maiau	France	7.23	7.70w	7.90w	7.80	7.69	6.12	7.90w	
2nd place, silver medalist(s)	Mamadou Gueye	Senegal	7.47	7.68	x	7.85	7.86w	7.60w	7.86w	
3rd place, bronze medalist(s)	Mouhcine Khoua	Morocco	7.46	7.64	x	7.65w	x	7.56	7.65w	
4	Adrian Vasile	Romania	7.23	7.63	x	7.31w	7.42	7.56	7.63	
5	Marcel Richard Mayack II	Cameroon	7.11	7.57w	7.48	7.29	7.17w	7.05w	7.57	
6	Thierry Konan	Ivory Coast	6.77	x	7.41	7.40	7.53	7.46	7.53	
7	Arren Young	Canada	x	x	7.31	7.23	x	7.37	7.37	
8	Bryson Patterson-Blasse	Canada	7.33	x	7.14	7.03	x	x	7.33	
9	Raymond Nkwemy Tchomfa	Cameroon	7.26	7.05	7.14				7.26	
10	Christopher Ullmann	Switzerland	7.19w	x	7.11				7.19w	
11	Cheikh Abba Badji	Senegal	x	x	7.09				7.09	
12	Romeo N'tia	Benin	x	6.91	x				6.91	
	Jonathan Drack	Mauritius							DNS	

=== Triple jump ===
24 July

Rank	Name	Nationality	#1	#2	#3	#4	#5	#6	Result	Notes
1st place, gold medalist(s)	Hugues Fabrice Zango	Burkina Faso	x	16.65	16.62	x	16.92w	x	16.92w	
2nd place, silver medalist(s)	Kevin Luron	France	15.90w	16.76	x	x	16.65w	16.46w	16.76	SB
3rd place, bronze medalist(s)	Mamadou Chérif Dia	Mali	15.50	16.23	16.43	16.24	x	16.59	16.59	
4	Adil Gandou	Morocco	x	x	16.31	x	–	–	16.31	
5	Jonathan Drack	Mauritius	15.80	x	x	16.05	15.24	15.81	16.05	
6	Cristi Nicuşor Boboc	Romania	x	x	15.42	15.58	x	x	15.58	
7	Cheickh Abba Badji	Senegal	15.47	15.53	x	x	x	15.50	15.53	
8	Levon Aghasyan	Armenia	15.41	x	15.52	x	x	x	15.52	
9	Marcel Richard Mayack II	Cameroon	15.21	15.37	15.36				15.37	SB

=== Shot put ===
23 July

Rank	Name	Nationality	#1	#2	#3	#4	#5	#6	Result	Notes
1st place, gold medalist(s)	Franck Elemba	Congo	19.04	19.69	19.68	x	19.99	19.65	19.99	
2nd place, silver medalist(s)	Bob Bertemes	Luxembourg	x	19.08	19.30	19.32	x	19.55	19.55	
3rd place, bronze medalist(s)	Bernard Henry Baptiste	Mauritius	16.99	17.56	17.28	17.06	17.24	16.84	17.56	SB
4	Siegfried-Luccioni Mve	Gabon	x	x	15.84	x	x	15.58	15.84	
5	Essohounamondom Tchalim	Togo	14.68	15.55	x	x	x	15.25	15.55	
6	Jonathan Gionet	New Brunswick	x	x	x	x	15.40	x	15.40	

=== Discus throw ===
26 July

Rank	Name	Nationality	#1	#2	#3	#4	#5	#6	Result	Notes
1st place, gold medalist(s)	Elbachir Mbarki	Morocco	53.46	51.26	56.51	57.14	55.04	56.52	57.14	SB
2nd place, silver medalist(s)	Marc-Antoine Lafrenaye-Dugas	Quebec	x	49.07	51.10	50.79	x	49.23	51.10	
3rd place, bronze medalist(s)	Essohounamondom Tchalim	Togo	x	45.84	49.45	50.47	46.87	x	50.47	
4	Christopher Sophie	Mauritius	48.33	48.25	49.17	50.15	x	48.52	50.15	SB

=== Javelin throw ===
25 July

Rank	Name	Nationality	#1	#2	#3	#4	#5	#6	Result	Notes
1st place, gold medalist(s)	George Zaharia	Romania	74.67	68.98	67.69	x	72.05	x	74.67	
2nd place, silver medalist(s)	Alexandru Novac	Romania	x	x	68.85	x	x	x	68.85	
3rd place, bronze medalist(s)	Tom Reuter	Luxembourg	64.40	63.95	61.57	x	64.21	63.97	64.40	

=== Decathlon ===
25–26 July

The highest mark recorded in each event is highlighted in yellow

Rank	Athlete	Nationality	100m	LJ	SP	HJ	400m	110m H	DT	PV	JT	1500m	Points	Notes
1st place, gold medalist(s)	Taylor Stewart	Canada	10.87	7.53	14.51	2.00	51.98	14.40	42.96	4.80	53.85	4:55.31	7852	
2nd place, silver medalist(s)	Ruben Gado	France	10.96	7.14	12.23	1.97	48.79	15.08	38.80	5.10	57.03	4:30.50	7839	
3rd place, bronze medalist(s)	Rostam Turner	Canada	11.22	6.36	13.44	1.88	50.50	16.17	44.75	4.40	55.58	4:37.54	7235	
4	Flavien Antille	Switzerland	11.58	7.31	12.29	2.00	51.74	15.62	36.01	4.50	54.92	4:51.20	7180	
5	Fabrice Rajah	Mauritius	11.80	6.62	12.79	1.97	53.83	15.16	36.67	4.10	51.03	4:48.41	6797	
6	Christopher Robertson	New Brunswick	11.77	6.62	10.97	1.94	53.25	15.63	38.45	4.10	50.28	4:48.32	6661	

== Women's results ==
=== 100 metres ===
Heats – 23 July
Wind:
Heat 1: -0.1 m/s, Heat 2: +0.4 m/s, Heat 3: +0.8 m/s

Rank	Heat	Name	Nationality	Time	Notes
1	3	Samantha Dagry	Switzerland	11.62	Q, SB
2	3	Leah Walkeden	Canada	11.70	Q
3	2	Natacha Ngoye Akamabi	Congo	11.72	Q, SB
4	2	Marie Gisèle Eleme Asse	Cameroon	11.73	Q
5	1	Assia Raziki	Morocco	11.81	Q, SB
6	1	Fanny Appes Ekanga	Cameroon	11.89	Q
7	3	Charifa Abdoullahi Labarang	Cameroon	11.89	q
8	2	Émy Béliveau	Canada	11.91	q
9	1	Nanzie Adeline Gouenon	Ivory Coast	12.01	
10	2	Mariam Bance	Burkina Faso	12.07	
11	2	Aziza Sbaity	Lebanon	12.08	
12	3	Marcelle Bouele Bondo	Congo	12.13	
13	1	Marie Joanilla Janvier	Mauritius	12.18	
14	1	Yenoukounme Midomide	Benin	12.25	SB
15	3	Françoise Dedy Tsaravola	Madagascar	12.27	
16	3	Adjoua Tryphene Kouame	Ivory Coast	12.28	
17	2	Prenam Pesse	Togo	12.32	
18	1	Yah Soucko Koïta	Mali	12.34	
	1	Christel Luntadila Mbaku	DR Congo	DQ	R162.6
	3	Eveline Sanches	Cape Verde	DQ	R162.6

Final – 24 July
Wind:
-0.5 m/s

Rank	Lane	Name	Nationality	Time	Notes
1st place, gold medalist(s)	3	Natacha Ngoye Akamabi	Congo	11.56	PB
2nd place, silver medalist(s)	8	Marie Gisèle Eleme Asse	Cameroon	11.59	PB
3rd place, bronze medalist(s)	4	Samantha Dagry	Switzerland	11.68	SB
4	6	Assia Raziki	Morocco	11.78	SB
5	5	Leah Walkeden	Canada	11.80	
6	2	Émy Béliveau	Canada	11.87	
7	7	Fanny Appes Ekanga	Cameroon	11.88	
8	1	Charifa Abdoullahi Labarang	Cameroon	11.95	

=== 200 metres ===
Heats – 26 July
Wind:
Heat 1: -1.0 m/s, Heat 2: -0.3 m/s, Heat 3: -1.8 m/s

Rank	Heat	Name	Nationality	Time	Notes
1	1	Natacha Ngoye Akamabi	Congo	23.39	Q, SB
2	2	Sarah Atcho	Switzerland	23.67	Q
3	1	Naomi Van den Broeck	Wallonia	23.85	Q, SB
4	1	Germaine Abessolo Bivina	Cameroon	23.91	q
5	1	Fanette Humair	Switzerland	24.03	q
6	1	Maya Stephens	Canada	24.09	SB
7	3	Elise Trynkler	France	24.33	Q
8	3	Mireille-Parfaite Gaha	Ivory Coast	24.38	Q
9	2	Charifa Abdoullahi Labarang	Cameroon	24.49	Q
10	2	Natasha Brown	Canada	24.82	
11	3	Marcelle Bouele Bondo	Congo	24.92	
12	2	Adjoua Tryphene Kouame	Ivory Coast	24.92	
13	1	Eveline Sanches	Cape Verde	25.24	SB
14	3	Aurelie Alcindor	Mauritius	25.25	
15	2	Prenam Pesse	Togo	25.92	
16	2	Afi Valérie Hounkpeto	Benin	26.58	
17	1	Ketura Ndoye Ti Nzapa	Central African Republic	26.59	
	1	Nanzie Adeline Gouenon	Ivory Coast	DNF	
	2	Assia Raziki	Morocco	DNF	
	3	Khadija Ouardi	Morocco	DNF	
	2	Aziza Sbaity	Lebanon	DNS	
	3	Khadijah Valentine	Canada	DNS	
	3	Fanny Appes Ekanga	Cameroon	DNS	

Final – 27 July
Wind:
-1.2 m/s

Rank	Lane	Name	Nationality	Time	Notes
1st place, gold medalist(s)	4	Natacha Ngoye Akamabi	Congo	23.69	PB
2nd place, silver medalist(s)	3	Sarah Atcho	Switzerland	24.14	
3rd place, bronze medalist(s)	5	Naomi Van den Broeck	Wallonia	24.24	
4	7	Mireille-Parfaite Gaha	Ivory Coast	24.25	
5	6	Elise Trynkler	France	24.30	
6	1	Germaine Abessolo Bivina	Cameroon	24.36	
7	2	Fanette Humair	Switzerland	24.47	
8	8	Charifa Abdoullahi Labarang	Cameroon	24.68	

=== 400 metres ===
Heats – 25 July

Rank	Heat	Name	Nationality	Time	Notes
1	1	Natassha McDonald	Canada	53.71	Q
2	2	Djénébou Danté	Mali	53.91	Q
3	2	Assia Raziki	Morocco	54.00	Q
4	1	Khadija Ouardi	Morocco	54.51	Q
5	2	Mariama Mamoudou Ittatou	Niger	55.55	Q
6	2	Nafy Mane	Senegal	55.56	q
7	1	Audrey Nkamsao Mbonda	Cameroon	55.71	Q, SB
8	1	Vijona Kryeziu	Kosovo	57.00	q
9	1	Lilit Harutyunyan	Armenia	57.02	
10	2	Aurélie Alcindor	Mauritius	57.16	SB
11	2	Ketura Ndoye Ti Nzapa	Central African Republic	58.82	
12	1	Mariama Barry	Guinea	1:02.70	SB
13	1	Louise-Anne Bertheau Plain	France	DQ	R162.6
	2	Souhra Ali Ahmed	Djibouti	DNS	

Final – 26 July

Rank	Lane	Name	Nationality	Time	Notes
1st place, gold medalist(s)	5	Djénébou Danté	Mali	52.23	SB
2nd place, silver medalist(s)	3	Natassha McDonald	Canada	52.34	SB
3rd place, bronze medalist(s)	4	Assia Raziki	Morocco	52.98	SB
4	6	Khadija Ouardi	Morocco	53.74	SB
5	2	Nafy Mane	Senegal	54.73	
6	7	Mariama Mamoudou Ittatou	Niger	55.22	
7	8	Audrey Nkamsao Mbonda	Cameroon	55.74	
	1	Vijona Kryeziu	Kosovo	DNF	

=== 800 metres ===
Heats – 23 July

Rank	Heat	Name	Nationality	Time	Notes
1	1	Noélie Yarigo	Benin	2:03.75	Q
2	1	Malika Akkaoui	Morocco	2:04.05	Q
3	1	Clarisse Moh	France	2:05.07	Q
4	1	Maité Bouchard	Quebec	2:05.41	q
5	1	Oumaima Saoud	Morocco	2:05.49	q
6	1	Lindsey Butterworth	Canada	2:07.63	
7	2	Siham Hilali	Morocco	2:09.09	Q
8	2	Laurence Côté	Quebec	2:09.25	Q
9	2	Florina Perdevara	Romania	2:09.28	Q
10	2	Helen Crofts	Canada	2:09.63	
11	2	Liliane Milabaie Nguetsa	Cameroon	2:10.56	
12	2	Souhra Ali Ahmed	Djibouti	2:11.46	
13	1	Sitan Bouaré	Mali	2:11.53	
13	2	Jessica Smith	Canada	2:12.14	
14	2	Lilit Harutyunyan	Armenia	2:12.38	
15	1	Elisabeth Mandaba	Central African Republic	2:15.38	
16	1	Leonce Missamou Bafoundissa	Congo	2:17.26	

Final – 24 July

Rank	Name	Nationality	Time	Notes
1st place, gold medalist(s)	Malika Akkaoui	Morocco	2:00.71	CR
2nd place, silver medalist(s)	Noélie Yarigo	Benin	2:01.27	
3rd place, bronze medalist(s)	Siham Hilali	Morocco	2:02.40	
4	Clarisse Moh	France	2:03.08	
5	Maité Bouchard	Quebec	2:03.91	
6	Oumaima Saoud	Morocco	2:04.10	SB
7	Laurence Côté	Quebec	2:04.82	
8	Florina Perdevara	Romania	2:05.48	

=== 1500 metres ===
27 July

Rank	Name	Nationality	Time	Notes
1st place, gold medalist(s)	Rababe Arafi	Morocco	4:17.23	
2nd place, silver medalist(s)	Malika Akkaoui	Morocco	4:17.36	
3rd place, bronze medalist(s)	Siham Hilali	Morocco	4:18.87	
4	Florina Pierdevara	Romania	4:21.74	
5	Clarisse Moh	France	4:22.13	
6	Lindsey Butterworh	Canada	4:22.82	
7	Laurence Côté	Quebec	4:24.16	
8	Kendra Pomfret	Canada	4:24.49	
9	Liliane Milabaie Nguetsa	Cameroon	4:27.91	
10	Sitan Bouaré	Mali	4:49.82	
	Erica Digby	Canada	DNS	

=== 5000 metres ===
26 July

Rank	Name	Nationality	Time	Notes
1st place, gold medalist(s)	Soukaina Atanane	Morocco	16:00.36	SB
2nd place, silver medalist(s)	Kaoutar Farkoussi	Morocco	16:01.53	
3rd place, bronze medalist(s)	Roxana Bârcă	Romania	16:07.61	
4	Monica Madalina Florea	Romania	16:20.76	
5	Erica Digby	Canada	16:21.88	
6	Victoria Coates	Canada	16:24.90	
7	Ritha Tumaini Nzabava	DR Congo	17:36.40	
8	Emma Neigel	Canada	18:39.42	
	Fatima Zahra Gardadi	Morocco	DNF	
	Anne-Marie Gauthier	Quebec	DNS	

=== 10,000 metres ===
24 July

Rank	Name	Nationality	Time	Notes
1st place, gold medalist(s)	Roxana Bârcă	Romania	35:31.13	
2nd place, silver medalist(s)	Hanane Qallouj	Morocco	35:34.69	
3rd place, bronze medalist(s)	Monica Madalina Florea	Romania	35:38.37	
4	Amina Tahiri	Morocco	35:43.92	
5	Fatima Zahra Gardadi	Morocco	35:51.41	
6	Melanie Myrand	Canada	36:05.56	
	Ritha Tumaini Nzabava	DR Congo	DNF	

=== Marathon ===
23 July

Rank	Name	Nationality	Time	Notes
1st place, gold medalist(s)	Shelley Doucet	New Brunswick	2:51:14	
2nd place, silver medalist(s)	Fatiha Benchatki	Morocco	3:13:44	

=== 100 metres hurdles ===
Heats – 24 July
Wind:
Heat 1: +1.7 m/s, Heat 2: +1.5 m/s

Rank	Heat	Name	Nationality	Time	Notes
1	2	Marthe Koala	Burkina Faso	13.44	Q
2	1	Rosvitha Okou	Ivory Coast	13.55	Q
3	2	Pauline Lett	France	13.55	Q
4	1	Ashlea Maddex	Canada	13.67	Q
5	2	Sarah Hammond	Canada	13.90	Q
6	1	Devyani Biswal	Canada	13.94	Q
7	1	Siliane Vancauwemberghe	Wallonia	13.95	q
8	1	Lara Marx	Luxembourg	14.00	q
9	2	Manivanh Chanthavong	Laos	15.24	
10	1	Christel El Saneh	Lebanon	15.27	SB
	2	Karel Elodie Ziketh	Ivory Coast	DNF	
	2	Tania Bambi	Quebec	DNF	
	2	Sanae Zouine	Morocco	DNF	
	1	Odile Ahouanwanou	Benin	DNS	

Final – 25 July
Wind:
+0.3 m/s

Rank	Lane	Name	Nationality	Time	Notes
1st place, gold medalist(s)	4	Marthe Koala	Burkina Faso	13.32	
2nd place, silver medalist(s)	6	Pauline Lett	France	13.32	
3rd place, bronze medalist(s)	5	Ashlea Maddex	Canada	13.44	
4	3	Rosvitha Okou	Ivory Coast	13.59	
5	7	Devyani Biswal	Canada	13.62	SB
6	8	Sarah Hammond	Canada	13.80	
7	2	Siliane Vancauwemberghe	Wallonia	13.99	
8	1	Lara Marx	Luxembourg	14.33	

=== 400 metres hurdles ===
24 July

Rank	Lane	Name	Nationality	Time	Notes
1st place, gold medalist(s)	6	Maëva Contion	France	57.38	
2nd place, silver medalist(s)	7	Anaïs Lufutucu	France	58.24	
3rd place, bronze medalist(s)	4	Farah Clerc	France	58.60	
4	2	Rokia Fofana	Burkina Faso	1:00.45	
5	3	Audrey Nkamsao Mbonda	Cameroon	1:00.53	
6	5	Helena Reinfels	Canada	1:03.11	

=== 3000 metres steeplechase ===
25 July

Rank	Name	Nationality	Time	Notes
1st place, gold medalist(s)	Fadwa Sidi Madane	Morocco	9:44.11	
2nd place, silver medalist(s)	Oumaima Saoud	Morocco	10:10.53	
3rd place, bronze medalist(s)	Marwa Bouzayani	Tunisia	10:10.78	
4	Jessy Lacourse	Canada	10:12.09	
5	Ophélie Claude-Boxberger	France	10:24.67	
6	Emma Neigel	Canada	11:27.67	

=== 4 × 100 metres relay ===
25 July

Rank	Lane	Nation	Competitors	Time	Notes
1st place, gold medalist(s)	3	Ivory Coast	Karel Elodie Ziketh, Mireille-Parfaite Gaha, Nanzie Adeline Gouenon, Marie-Josée Ta Lou	44.22	
2nd place, silver medalist(s)	6	Cameroon	Germaine Abessolo Bivina, Marie Gisèle Eleme Asse, Charifa Abdoullahi Labarang, Fanny Appes Ekanga	45.23	
3rd place, bronze medalist(s)	1	Canada	Natasha Brown, Émy Béliveau, Leah Walkeden, Khadijah Valentine	45.84	
4	4	Congo	Jedilesse Baleba Tini, Natacha Ngoye Akamabi, Michèle Felie Mboyi, Marcelle Bouele Bondo	46.29	NR
5	8	France	Pauline Lett, Farah Clerc, Elise Trynkler, Maëva Contion	46.31	
	5	Benin	Rachidatou Zounon, Noélie Yarigo, Souliatou Saka, Yenoukounme Midomide	DNF	
	7	Burkina Faso		DNS	
	2	Morocco		DNS	

=== 20 kilometres walk ===
27 July

Rank	Name	Nationality	Time	Notes
1st place, gold medalist(s)	Marine Quennehen	France	1:45:35	
2nd place, silver medalist(s)	Amandine Marcou	France	1:50:30	
3rd place, bronze medalist(s)	Mihaela Pușcașu	Romania	1:53:45	

=== High jump ===
26 July

Rank	Name	Nationality	1.60	1.65	1.70	1.75	1.80	1.85	1.88	1.91	1.93	Result	Notes
1st place, gold medalist(s)	Lissa Labiche	Seychelles	–	–	–	o	o	o	o	xxo	xxx	1.91	
2nd place, silver medalist(s)	Claire Orcel	Wallonia	–	–	–	o	o	o	o	xxx		1.88	SB
3rd place, bronze medalist(s)	Cathy Zimmer	Luxembourg	o	o	xo	xxx						1.70	
	Odile Ahouanwanou	Benin										DNS	

=== Pole vault ===
24 July

Rank	Name	Nationality	3.40	3.55	3.70	3.80	3.95	4.00	4.10	4.20	Result	Notes
1st place, gold medalist(s)	Pascale Stöcklin	Switzerland	–	–	–	o	o	o	xxo	xxx	4.10	
2nd place, silver medalist(s)	Marion Lotout	France	–	–	–	–	–	o	–	xxx	4.00	
3rd place, bronze medalist(s)	Paige Ridout	Canada	–	–	–	o	o	–	xxx		3.95	
4	Ariane Beaumont-Courteau	Canada	–	–	xxo	o	o	–	xxx		3.95	
5	Edna Semedo	Luxembourg	–	xo	xxx						3.55	
6	Sinali Alima Ouattara	Ivory Coast	o	xxx							3.40	
	Robin Bone	Canada	–	–	–	xxx					NM	
	Ladina Kierdorf	Luxembourg	xxx								NM	
	Fanny Leimgruber	Switzerland									DNS	

=== Long jump ===
26 July

Rank	Name	Nationality	#1	#2	#3	#4	#5	#6	Result	Notes
1st place, gold medalist(s)	Marthe Koala	Burkina Faso	5.93	5.89	6.30w	–	6.52	–	6.52	NR
2nd place, silver medalist(s)	Joelle Mbumi Nkouindjin	Cameroon	5.76	x	5.85	6.12	6.34w	x	6.34w	
3rd place, bronze medalist(s)	Fatime Affessi	Switzerland	5.97	x	6.17	6.04w	5.96	x	6.17	
4	Pauline Lett	France	x	5.77	6.14	5.89	6.14	6.14w	6.14	SB
5	Emily Omahen	Canada	5.53	5.47	5.85	x	x	5.92w	5.92w	
6	Marlyne Sarah Ngo Ngoa	Cameroon	5.88	x	5.91	x	5.91w	5.48	5.91	
7	Divyajyoti Biswal	Canada	5.85	x	x	5.83w	x	x	5.85	
8	Sokhna Safietou Kante	Senegal	5.46	5.62	5.73	5.59w	5.60	5.42	5.73	
9	Yah Soucko Koïta	Mali	5.48	5.70w	5.52				5.70w	
10	Sangone Kandji	Senegal	5.69	x	5.67				5.69	
11	Mariam Issifou	Benin	5.63w	5.62	5.46				5.63w	
12	Jedilesse Baleba Tini	Congo	4.61	4.50w	5.02				5.02	
	Sanae Zouine	Morocco							DNS	

=== Triple jump ===
24 July

Rank	Name	Nationality	#1	#2	#3	#4	#5	#6	Result	Notes
1st place, gold medalist(s)	Caroline Ehrhardt	Canada	13.09	13.45	13.55	13.59	13.65	13.83w	13.83w	
2nd place, silver medalist(s)	Joelle Mbumi Nkouindjin	Cameroon	13.46	13.47	13.55	13.58	13.23	x	13.58	SB
3rd place, bronze medalist(s)	Cristina Bujin	Romania	x	x	x	x	x	13.20	13.20	
4	Divyajyoti Biswal	Canada	x	x	x	13.04w	13.07	13.13	13.13	
5	Sangoné Kandji	Senegal	12.44	12.95	x	x	12.94	13.05	13.05	
6	Sokhna Safiétou Kanté	Senegal	12.83	12.84	12.56	12.68	12.80	12.50w	12.84	
7	Fatimata Zoungrana	Burkina Faso	12.22w	12.03	12.15	12.63	12.40	12.63	12.63	
	Sanae Zouine	Morocco							DNS	

=== Shot put ===
25 July

Rank	Name	Nationality	#1	#2	#3	#4	#5	#6	Result	Notes
1st place, gold medalist(s)	Auriol Dongmo Mekemnang	Cameroon	17.20	17.68	17.64	x	x	x	17.68	
2nd place, silver medalist(s)	Carine Mekam Ndong	Gabon	14.70	15.02	15.08	15.34	x	14.85	15.34	
3rd place, bronze medalist(s)	Alex Porlier Langlois	Quebec	14.36	x	x	x	15.24	14.88	15.24	
4	Odile Ahouanwanou	Benin	14.66	14.49	x	14.56	14.78	14.19	14.78	SB
5	Stéphanie Krumlovsky	Luxembourg	12.77	13.00	x	12.47	12.89	12.83	13.00	
6	Mariama Keita	Guinea	8.85	9.70	9.68	9.92	x	9.30	9.92	SB

=== Hammer throw ===
27 July

Rank	Name	Nationality	#1	#2	#3	#4	#5	#6	Result	Notes
1st place, gold medalist(s)	Bianca Perie-Ghelber	Romania	67.79	64.34	67.66	66.73	x	67.51	67.79	
2nd place, silver medalist(s)	Lauren Stuart	Canada	64.31	x	65.48	64.57	63.91	x	65.48	
3rd place, bronze medalist(s)	Bianca Lazăr Fazecaş	Romania	61.72	x	63.56	62.70	60.87	x	63.56	
4	Jennifer Batu	Congo	x	60.06	x	58.04	62.79	56.01	62.79	SB
5	Nicole Zihlmann	Switzerland	59.96	59.76	61.21	60.06	x	x	61.21	
6	Lætitia Bambara	Burkina Faso	61.15	x	x	58.63	x	x	61.15	
7	Soukaina Zakkour	Morocco	55.34	x	57.66	56.30	56.78	58.59	58.59	
8	Elizabeth MacDonald	New Brunswick	50.58	49.40	x	50.37	x	52.18	52.18	SB
9	Geraldine Davin	Luxembourg	47.26	x	43.34				47.26	
10	Naomie Maltais	New Brunswick	x	42.56	x				42.56	

=== Javelin throw ===
26 July

Rank	Name	Nationality	#1	#2	#3	#4	#5	#6	Result	Notes
1st place, gold medalist(s)	Pascale Dumont	Quebec	x	x	44.33	43.38	47.82	52.16	52.16	
2nd place, silver medalist(s)	Kenefing Traoré	Mali	48.62	46.24	45.54	43.90	41.76	49.85	49.85	NR
3rd place, bronze medalist(s)	Nadja Marie Pasternack	Switzerland	x	x	x	x	45.76	49.20	49.20	
4	Jessika Rosun	Mauritius	47.51	46.84	48.02	x	46.53	46.72	48.02	
	Soukaina Zakkour	Morocco	x	r	–	–	–	–	NM	
