= 2024 African Championships in Athletics – Women's hammer throw =

Women's hammer throw at the 2024 African Championships in Athletics
- Venue: Japoma Stadium
- Location: Douala, Cameroon
- Dates: 22 June
- Competitors: 12 from 9 nations
- Winning distance: 67.82 m

Medalists
gold medal	Zahra Tatar	Algeria
silver medal	Sade Olatoye	Nigeria
bronze medal	Xena Ngomateke	Central African Republic

The women's hammer throw event at the 2024 African Championships in Athletics was held on 22 June in Douala, Cameroon.

== Records ==
Records before the 2024 African Athletics Championships
Record	Athlete (nation)	Distance (m)	Location	Date
World record	Anita Włodarczyk (POL)	82.98	Warsaw, Poland	28 August 2016
African record	Annette Echikunwoke (NGR)	75.49	Tucson, United States	22 May 2021
Championship record	Amy Sène (SEN)	68.35	Durban, South Africa	22 June 2016
World leading	Brooke Andersen (USA)	79.92	Tucson, United States	4 May 2024
African leading	Oyesade Olatoye (NGR)	71.88	Rathdrum, United States	1 June 2024

== Results ==
Rank	Athlete	Nationality	#1	#2	#3	#4	#5	#6	Result	Notes
1st place, gold medalist(s)	Zahra Tatar	Algeria	x	67.41	67.82	61.33	62.80	x	67.82	
2nd place, silver medalist(s)	Sade Olatoye	Nigeria	63.83	67.73	65.99	65.30	x	66.41	67.72	
~~3~~	Xena Ngomateke	Central African Republic	~~x~~	~~65.84~~	~~61.32~~	~~63.13~~	~~62.74~~	~~62.81~~	~~65.84~~	DQ, NR
3rd place, bronze medalist(s)	Zouina Bouzebra	Algeria							63.83	
4	Leandri Holtzhausen	South Africa	60.66	60.04	62.06	x	x	62.00	62.06	
5	Colette Uys	South Africa	x	56.14	61.12	x	x	x	61.12	
6	Annie Nabwe	Liberia	x	x	58.15	x	x	x	58.15	
7	Roselyn Nyachama Rakamba	Kenya	x	47.62	53.19	53.30	51.66	x	53.19	
8	Emilie Dia	Mali	51.33	x	x				51.33	
9	Lucy Anyango Omondi	Kenya	45.12	46.26	48.48				48.48	
10	Michelle Koussalouka Nkazi	Republic of the Congo	47.16	44.41	x				47.16	
11	Nancy Kanini	Kenya	x	x	44.97				44.97	
12	Nora Monie	Cameroon	x	32.37	x				32.37	

== See also ==
- Athletics at the 2023 African Games – Women's hammer throw
