= 2022 African Championships in Athletics – Women's hammer throw =

The women's hammer throw event at the 2022 African Championships in Athletics was held on 11 June in Port Louis, Mauritius.

== Results ==
Rank	Athlete	Nationality	#1	#2	#3	#4	#5	#6	Result	Notes
1st place, gold medalist(s)	Sade Olatoye	Nigeria	57.78	57.98	63.67	62.72	59.66	63.64	63.67	
2nd place, silver medalist(s)	Zouina Bouzebra	Algeria	59.86	59.66	62.36	63.48	x	53.46	63.48	
3rd place, bronze medalist(s)	Rawan Barakat	Egypt	58.98	60.36	59.62	62.67	62.45	60.85	62.67	
4	Zahra Tatar	Algeria	59.12	58.49	60.92	59.52	62.11	60.43	62.11	
5	Margaretha Cumming	South Africa	57.14	56.25	57.27	x	56.98	57.74	57.74	
6	Leandri Geel	South Africa	x	52.89	56.30	56.42	x	x	56.42	
7	Samira Addi	Morocco	x	51.24	x	53.87	53.55	55.78	55.78	
8	Emilie Dia	Mali	52.67	49.85	51.97	x	x	48.84	52.67	
9	Julianne Clair	Mauritius	x	x	50.25				50.25	
10	Fatou Diocou	Senegal	x	49.02	x				49.02	
11	Linda Oseso	Kenya	48.87	48.68	x				48.87	
12	Marinda Greyling	South Africa	48.60	47.45	x				48.60	
13	Lucy Omondi	Kenya	41.32	39.80	43.29				43.29	
	Queen Obisesan	Nigeria							DNS	
