= Athletics at the 2019 African Games – Women's hammer throw =

The women's hammer throw event at the 2019 African Games was held on 27 August in Rabat.

== Results ==
Rank	Name	Nationality	#1	#2	#3	#4	#5	#6	Result	Notes
1st place, gold medalist(s)	Lætitia Bambara	Burkina Faso	58.04	61.49	x	64.03	59.77	65.28	65.28	
2nd place, silver medalist(s)	Temi Ogunrinde	Nigeria	64.68	x	63.18	61.92	62.42	x	64.68	
3rd place, bronze medalist(s)	Zouina Bouzebra	Algeria	61.32	58.85	62.79	x	63.34	x	63.34	
4	Queen Obisesan	Nigeria	61.82	61.41	61.33	60.56	x	57.91	61.82	
5	Rawan Barakat	Egypt	60.45	60.60	59.74	60.93	61.17	60.73	61.17	
6	Chene Pretorius	South Africa	x	x	58.34	53.29	60.30	x	60.30	
7	Soukaina Zakkour	Morocco	58.52	59.48	59.54	x	57.58	x	59.54	
8	Samira Addi	Morocco	54.83	57.33	x				57.33	
9	Margaretha Cumming	South Africa	x	55.57	x				55.57	
10	Jennifer Batu	Republic of the Congo	x	x	54.04				54.04	
11	Fatou Diocou	Senegal	51.95	x	x				51.95	
12	Juliane Clair	Mauritius	x	47.90	45.91				47.90	
13	Roselyn Rakamba	Kenya	47.61	x	46.48				47.61	
14	Lucy Anyango Omondi	Kenya	44.96	47.37	47.52				47.52	
15	Emilie Dia	Mali	42.82	x	43.64				43.64	
DQ	Oyesade Olatoye	Nigeria	60.21	61.99	x	x	x	63.97	~~63.97~~	
