= 2018 African Championships in Athletics – Women's hammer throw =

The women's hammer throw event at the 2018 African Championships in Athletics was held on 2 August in Asaba, Nigeria.

== Results ==
Rank	Athlete	Nationality	#1	#2	#3	#4	#5	#6	Result	Notes
1st place, gold medalist(s)	Soukaina Zakkour	Morocco	68.28	x	x	64.43	x	x	68.28	NR
2nd place, silver medalist(s)	Temilola Ogunrinde	Nigeria	62.09	x	66.57	67.39	65.36	62.26	67.39	NR
3rd place, bronze medalist(s)	Jennifer Batu	Republic of the Congo	60.66	x	58.82	66.43	x	x	66.43	NR
4	Zouina Bouzebra	Algeria	64.48	x	x	64.09	64.49	62.64	64.49	NR
5	Queen Obisesan	Nigeria	x	63.02	x	49.76	62.02	62.44	63.02	
6	Margo Coetzee	South Africa	55.45	x	58.28	58.86	56.42	x	58.86	
7	Lætitia Bambara	Burkina Faso	56.35	x	–	–	–	–	56.35	
8	Roselyn Rakamba	Kenya	x	48.03	55.57	x	x	x	55.57	
	Fatou Diocou	Senegal	x	x	x				NM	
	Juliane Clair	Mauritius	x	x	x				NM	
