= Athletics at the 2011 All-Africa Games – Women's hammer throw =

The women's hammer throw event at the 2011 All-Africa Games was held on 12 September.

== Results ==
Rank	Athlete	Nationality	#1	#2	#3	#4	#5	#6	Result	Notes
1st place, gold medalist(s)	Ami Sene	Senegal	x	x	60.99	x	61.48	61.38	61.48	
2nd place, silver medalist(s)	Sarra Ben Saad	Tunisia	49,69	59.65	x	56.18	57.10	x	59.65	
3rd place, bronze medalist(s)	Rana Ahmed Ibrahim	Egypt	57.79	58.10	58.57	x	x	53.15	58.57	
4	Nehal Kamal Ahmed	Egypt	58.18	x	x	55.82	54.53	53.58	58.18	
5	Linda Benin	Ghana	55.96	56.15	57.71	x	56.31	55.48	57.71	
6	Queen Obisesan	Nigeria	50.11	54.80	51.50	55.62	52.27	57.02	57.02	
7	Sophie Nyakou	Togo	56.98	53.33	56.73	x	x	49.89	56.98	
8	Bidemi Balogun	Nigeria	x	53.69	54.14	53.85	52.10	x	54.14	
9	Elfna Madeline Ampsdu	Ghana	51.28	x	50.10				51.28	
10	Florence Ezeh	Togo	44.43	46.40	48.90				48.90	
11	Doris Ange Ratsimbazafy	Madagascar	47.11	46.04	x				47.11	
12	Mafuca Dimaketa	Angola	x	x	46.33				46.33	
