= Lætitia Bambara =

French-born Burkinabé hammer thrower

Personal information
- Full name: Lætitia Kimalou Bambara
- Nationality: Burkina Faso
- Born: 30 March 1984 (age 42) Bordeaux, France

Sport
- Sport: Athletics
- Event: Hammer Throw
Medal record
Women's Athletics
Representing Burkina Faso
African Games
Gold medal – first place	2015 Brazzaville	Hammer throw
Gold medal – first place	2019 Rabat	Hammer throw
African Championships
Gold medal – first place	2014 Marrakesh	Hammer throw
Silver medal – second place	2012 Porto-Novo	Hammer throw
Silver medal – second place	2016 Durban	Hammer throw
- Updated on 26 August 2016

Lætitia Kimalou Bambara (born 30 March 1984) is a French-born hammer thrower representing Burkina Faso. She won several medals on continental medal in addition to finishing fourth at the 2007 Summer Universiade.

Her personal best in the event is 68.59 metres (Sotteville-lès-Rouen, June 2016) is the current Burkinabé record and all time 2nd best in Africa.

== Competition record ==
Year	Competition	Venue	Position	Event	Notes
Representing France
2003	European Junior Championships	Tampere, Finland	19th (q)	Hammer throw	55.16 m
2005	European U23 Championships	Erfurt, Germany	14th (q)	Hammer throw	59.24 m
2007	Universiade	Bangkok, Thailand	4th	Hammer throw	65.34 m
Representing Burkina Faso
2012	African Championships	Porto-Novo, Benin	2nd	Hammer throw	65.08 m
2014	African Championships	Marrakesh, Morocco	1st	Hammer throw	65.44 m
2014	Continental Cup	Marrakesh, Morocco	7th	Hammer throw	58.22 m
2015	African Games	Brazzaville, Republic of the Congo	1st	Hammer throw	66.91 m
2016	African Championships	Durban, South Africa	2nd	Hammer throw	68.12 m
2017	Jeux de la Francophonie	Abidjan, Ivory Coast	6th	Hammer throw	61.15 m
2018	African Championships	Asaba, Nigeria	7th	Hammer throw	56.35 m
2019	African Games	Rabat, Morocco	1st	Hammer throw	65.28 m
