= Jean-Yann de Grace =

Mauritian sprinter

Personal information
- Born: 19 May 1995 (age 30) La Tour Koeing, Mauritius
- Height: 1.82 m (6 ft 0 in)
- Weight: 79 kg (174 lb)

Sport
- Sport: Athletics
- Event(s): 100 m, 200 m
- Club: Versoix Athlétisme

Marie Jean-Yann de Grace (born 19 May 1995) is a Mauritian sprinter. He represented his country in the 60 metres at the 2018 World Indoor Championships reaching the semifinals.

== International competitions ==
Year	Competition	Venue	Position	Event	Notes
Representing Mauritius
2013	African Junior Championships	Bambous, Mauritius	4th	100 m	10.81
2013	African Junior Championships	Bambous, Mauritius	2nd	4 × 100 m relay	40.86
2014	African Championships	Marrakesh, Morocco	30th (h)	100 m	10.78
2014	African Championships	Marrakesh, Morocco	22nd (h)	200 m	21.49
2017	Jeux de la Francophonie	Abidjan, Ivory Coast	7th	100 m	10.58
2018	World Indoor Championships	Birmingham, United Kingdom	29th (h)	60 m	6.82
2018	Commonwealth Games	Gold Coast, Australia	33rd (h)	100 m	10.53
2018	Commonwealth Games	Gold Coast, Australia	27th (h)	200 m	21.18
2018	African Championships	Asaba, Nigeria	27th (h)	100 m	10.83
2018	African Championships	Asaba, Nigeria	32nd (h)	200 m	21.82

== Personal bests ==
Outdoor

- 100 metres – 10.37 (-1.1 m/s, Bern 2017)
- 200 metres – 21.09 (+1.5 m/s, Réduit 2015)

Indoor

- 60 metres – 6.70 (Magglingen 2018)
- 200 metres – 20.95 (Aubiére 2018)
