= Athletics at the 2003 All-Africa Games – Women's hammer throw =

The women's hammer throw event at the 2003 All-Africa Games was held on October 11.

== Results ==
Rank	Name	Nationality	Result	Notes
1st place, gold medalist(s)	Marwa Ahmed Hussein	Egypt	64.28	
2nd place, silver medalist(s)	Olufunke Adeoye	Nigeria	58.86	
3rd place, bronze medalist(s)	Vivian Chukwuemeka	Nigeria	56.54	
4	Doris Ange Ratsimbazafy	Madagascar	53.18	
5	M. Borges	Cape Verde	36.69	
