= 2010 African Championships in Athletics – Women's hammer throw =

The women's hammer throw at the 2010 African Championships in Athletics was held on July 28.

== Results ==
Rank	Athlete	Nationality	#1	#2	#3	#4	#5	#6	Result	Notes
1st place, gold medalist(s)	Amy Sène	Senegal	61.77	61.59	X	64.11	62.21	62.92	64.11	NR
2nd place, silver medalist(s)	Marwa Hussein	Egypt	62.36	61.27	60.77	62.09	62.04	X	62.36	
3rd place, bronze medalist(s)	Florence Ezeh	Togo	57.51	57.74	57.94	56.48	X	57.58	57.94	
4	Fatine Oubourogaa	Morocco	57.27	X	57.70	X	X	X	57.70	
5	Linda Benin	Ghana	53.79	51.66	53.79	57.55	51.05	55.61	57.55	PB
6	Amina Saada	Algeria	56.78	57.20	56.03	X	56.06	54.16	57.20	
7	Zouina Bouzebra	Algeria	53.54	55.59	55.85	X	X	X	55.85	
8	Queen Obisesan	Nigeria	54.03	51.29	49.75	47.52	50.33	50.78	54.03	
9	Bolanle Ogun	Nigeria	49.66	X	53.51				53.51	
10	Sophia Nyakou	Togo	X	52.59	52.97				52.97	
11	Linda Ngendo Oseso	Kenya	X	X	48.30				48.30	SB
12	Mafuta Dimaketa	Angola	48.29	47.93	X				48.29	
13	Lucy Chemutai Kibet	Kenya	40.41	X	41.10				41.10	SB
14	Lucy Anyango Omondi	Kenya	40.54	38.72	X				40.54	
