= 2011 World Youth Championships in Athletics – Girls' 2000 metres steeplechase =

Girls' 2000 metres steeplechase at the 2011 World Youth Championships in Athletics
- Venue: Stadium Lille Métropole
- Dates: 8 July (heats); 10 July (final)
- Competitors: 28
- Winning time: 6:16.41 WYL

Medalists
gold medal	Norah Jeruto	Kenya
silver medal	Fadwa Sidi Madane	Morocco
bronze medal	Lilian Chemweno	Kenya

The girls' 2000 metres steeplechase at the 2011 World Youth Championships in Athletics was held at the Stadium Lille Métropole on 8 and 10 July.

== Medalists ==
Gold	Silver	Bronze
Norah Jeruto; Kenya	Fadwa Sidi Madane; Morocco	Lilian Chemweno; Kenya

== Records ==
Prior to the competition, the following records were as follows.

World Youth Best	Korahubish Itaa (ETH)	6:11.83	Bressanone, Italy	10 July 2009
Championship Record	Korahubish Itaa (ETH)	6:11.83	Bressanone, Italy	10 July 2009
World Youth Leading	Norah Jeruto (KEN)	6:25.8	Nairobi, Kenya	8 June 2011

== Heats ==
Qualification rule: first 4 of each heat (Q) plus the 4 fastest times (q) qualified.

=== Heat 1 ===
Rank	Name	Nationality	Time	Notes
1	Norah Jeruto	Kenya	6:20.67	Q, WYL
2	Motu Megersa	Ethiopia	6:30.81	Q, PB
3	Fadwa Sidi Madane	Morocco	6:34.10	Q, PB
4	Belén Casetta	Argentina	6:35.40	Q, PB
5	Nancy Cheptegei	Uganda	6:38.57	q, PB
6	Brianna Nerud	United States	6:38.80	q
7	Amy-Eloise Neale	Great Britain	6:46.07	q
8	Bianca Budaes	Romania	6:52.04	PB
9	Olja Nikolić	Serbia	6:54.99	PB
10	Iman Dumas	France	6:55.13	PB
11	Alicja Konieczek	Poland	6:55.31	
12	Tanya Humeniuk	Canada	6:59.30	PB
13	Beatriz Álvarez	Spain	6:59.66	
14	Shiivomwene Shilongo	Namibia	7:20.24	

=== Heat 2 ===
Rank	Name	Nationality	Time	Notes
1	Lilian Chemweno	Kenya	6:31.66	Q, PB
2	Madeleine Meyers	United States	6:34.80	Q
3	Tejinesh Gebisa	Ethiopia	6:35.22	Q, PB
4	Dana Loghin	Romania	6:41.96	Q, PB
5	Oona Kettunen	Finland	6:43.67	q, PB
6	Katelyn Hayward	Canada	6:47.78	PB
7	Viktoriia Kaliuzhna	Ukraine	6:48.24	PB
8	Zulema Arenas	Peru	6:49.33	PB
9	Solenn Riou	France	6:52.36	PB
10	Hadjer Soukhal	Algeria	6:54.28	PB
11	Rafika Abdennebi	Tunisia	6:56.77	PB
12	Elisa Hernández	Mexico	7:15.93	
13	Astrid Montuclard	French Polynesia	7:44.85	
	Sheila Marrón	Spain	DNF	

== Final ==
Rank	Name	Nationality	Time	Notes
1st place, gold medalist(s)	Norah Jeruto	Kenya	6:16.41	WYL
2nd place, silver medalist(s)	Fadwa Sidi Madane	Morocco	6:20.98	PB
3rd place, bronze medalist(s)	Lilian Chemweno	Kenya	6:21.85	PB
4	Motu Megersa	Ethiopia	6:28.21	PB
5	Tejinesh Gebisa	Ethiopia	6:29.08	PB
6	Madeleine Meyers	United States	6:29.20	PB
7	Brianna Nerud	United States	6:29.56	PB
8	Nancy Cheptegei	Uganda	6:34.38	PB
9	Oona Kettunen	Finland	6:34.71	PB
10	Belén Casetta	Argentina	6:35.47	
11	Amy-Eloise Neale	Great Britain	6:37.27	PB
12	Dana Loghin	Romania	6:40.83	PB
