= 2012 African Championships in Athletics – Women's hammer throw =

The women's hammer throw at the 2012 African Championships in Athletics was held at the Stade Charles de Gaulle on 29 June.

== Medalists ==
Gold	Amy Sène; Senegal
Silver	Lætitia Bambara; Burkina Faso
Bronze	Sarah Bensaad; Tunisia

== Records ==
Standing records prior to the 2012 African Championships in Athletics
World record	Betty Heidler (GER)	79.42	Halle, Germany	21 May 2011
African record	Amy Sène (SEN)	69.10	Angers, France	15 June 2012
Championship record	Marwa Hussein (EGY)	66.14	Brazzaville, Republic of the Congo	17 July 2004

== Schedule ==
Date	Time	Round
29 June 2012	16:30	Final

== Results ==
=== Final ===
Rank	Athlete	Nationality	#1	#2	#3	#5	#5	#6	Result	Notes
1st place, gold medalist(s)	Amy Sène	Senegal	65.49	65.05	x	65.55	x	63.10	65.55	
2nd place, silver medalist(s)	Lætitia Bambara	Burkina Faso	62.55	65.08	x	61.24	x	61.26	65.08	
3rd place, bronze medalist(s)	Sarah Bensaad	Tunisia	x	59.75	60.75	60.48	59.02	57.29	60.75	
4	Rana Ahmad Taha	Egypt	59.70	59.42	59.52	x	x	58.93	59.70	
5	Linda Oseso	Kenya	56.14	x	58.07	57.02	x	x	58.07	
6	Zouina Bouzebra	Algeria	55.57	56.42	55.84	56.67	56.66	57.31	57.31	
7	Effua Ampadu	Ghana	54.75	52.73	53.09	47.31	52.56	x	54.75	
8	Annemie Smith	South Africa	51.90	x	x	52.65	51.55	52.09	52.65	
	Ran Ibrahim	Egypt							DNS	
