= 2014 African Championships in Athletics – Women's hammer throw =

The women's hammer throw event at the 2014 African Championships in Athletics was held on August 10 on Stade de Marrakech.

== Results ==
Rank	Athlete	Nationality	#1	#2	#3	#4	#5	#6	Result	Notes
1st place, gold medalist(s)	Lætitia Bambara	Burkina Faso	62.37	64.33	64.54	64.24	x	65.44	65.44	
2nd place, silver medalist(s)	Amy Sène	Senegal	x	60.06	x	63.40	63.76	64.46	64.46	
3rd place, bronze medalist(s)	Sarah Bensaad	Tunisia	x	59.89	57.99	59.53	59.08	60.97	60.97	
4	Queen Obisesan	Nigeria	x	56.49	57.88	58.95	59.99	x	59.99	
5	Zouina Bouzebra	Algeria	55.85	53.83	58.71	58.48	x	x	58.71	
6	Nanette Stapelberg	South Africa	54.76	x	x	55.49	x	54.21	55.49	
7	Aya Ebrahem Adly	Egypt	x	49.67	52.61	x	50.10	x	52.61	
8	Lucy Omondi	Kenya	48.05	51.44	47.42	44.60	46.53	x	51.44	
9	Nabiha Gueddah	Tunisia	x	x	50.32				50.32	
10	Soukaina Zakour	Morocco	x	x	49.36				49.36	
11	Linda Oseso	Kenya	44.56	48.06	x				48.06	
12	Fatine Oubourougaa	Morocco	46.78	47.96	x				47.96	
13	Mafula Di Mareta	Angola	x	45.25	44.99				45.25	
14	Esther Melissa Arlanda	Mauritius	40.70	x	40.82				40.82	
	Julia Agawu	Ghana							DNS	
