= 2026 African Championships in Athletics – Women's hammer throw =

Women's hammer throw at the 2026 African Championships in Athletics
- Venue: Legon Sports Stadium
- Location: Accra, Ghana
- Dates: 13 May
- Competitors: 7 from 6 nations
- Winning time: 69.82

Medalists
gold medal	Zahra Tatar	Algeria
silver medal	Oyesade Olatoye	Nigeria
bronze medal	Leandri Holtzhausen	South Africa

The women's hammer throw event at the 2026 African Championships in Athletics was held on 13 May in Accra, Ghana.

== Results ==
Rank	Athlete	Nationality	#1	#2	#3	#4	#5	#6	Result	Notes
1st place, gold medalist(s)	Zahra Tatar	Algeria	x	69.82	x	69.34	x	61.67	69.82	CR
2nd place, silver medalist(s)	Oyesade Olatoye	Nigeria	x	68.23	68.51	69.60	67.54	x	69.60	
3rd place, bronze medalist(s)	Leandri Holtzhausen	South Africa	65.19	66.99	x	65.25	66.12	x	66.99	
4	Colette Uys	South Africa	63.76	63.83	64.17	x	61.23	x	64.17	
5	Rawan Ayman Ibrahim Barakat	Egypt	x	58.32	57.27	58.45	61.23	57.63	61.23	
6	Emilie Dia	Mali	49.09	x	46.47	53.01	49.69	50.66	53.01	
7	Juliane Clair	Mauritius	51.03	x	49.15	46.75	x	49.89	51.03	
	Michelle Koussalouka Nkazi	Republic of the Congo							DNS	
	Nora Monie	Cameroon							DNS	
