= Jennifer Batu =

Republic of the Congo athlete

Jennifer Batu Bawsita
Personal information
- Nationality: Republic of the Congo
- Born: 24 October 1993 (age 32)

Sport
- Sport: Athletics
- Event: Hammer Throw
Medal record
Women's athletics
Representing Republic of the Congo
African Games
Bronze medal – third place	2015 Brazzaville	Hammer throw
African Championships
Bronze medal – third place	2018 Asaba	Hammer throw

Jennifer Batu Bawsita (born 24 October 1993 at Montereau Fault Yonne), is a Franco-Congolese athlete, who specializes in the hammer throw.

== Biography ==
She began athletics in 2004 and competed for the club Us Nemours Saint Pierre athletics until 2011, then she was transferred to the club, l'Entente Franconville Césame Val d'Oise. In 2015, she finished third at the Africa Games at Brazzaville. With a hurl of 62.13m. She improved her own record and that of the Congo.

== International competitions ==
Year	Competition	Venue	Position	Event	Notes
Representing the Republic of the Congo
2015	African Games	Brazzaville, Republic of the Congo	3rd	Hammer throw	62.13 m
2016	African Championships	Durban, South Africa	6th	Hammer Throw	60.00 m
2017	Jeux de la Francophonie	Abidjan, Ivory Coast	4th	Hammer Throw	62.79 m
2018	African Championships	Asaba, Nigeria	3rd	Hammer throw	66.43 m
2019	African Games	Rabat, Morocco	11th	Hammer throw	54.04 m
