= 2006 African Championships in Athletics – Women's hammer throw =

The women's hammer throw event at the 2006 African Championships in Athletics was held at the Stade Germain Comarmond on August 9.

== Results ==
Rank	Name	Nationality	#1	#2	#3	#4	#5	#6	Result	Notes
1st place, gold medalist(s)	Marwa Hussein	Egypt	57.60	62.16	x	61.31	61.66	60.40	62.16	
2nd place, silver medalist(s)	Blessing Egwu	Nigeria	x	x	51.77	x	x	50.11	51.77	
3rd place, bronze medalist(s)	Menakshee Totah	Mauritius	x	36.68	x	x	x	x	36.68	
	Hayat El Ghazi	Morocco							DQ	

Note: Hayat El Ghazi who originally won the silver was later disqualified for doping.
