= 2008 African Championships in Athletics – Women's hammer throw =

The women's hammer throw event at the 2008 African Championships in Athletics was held at the Addis Ababa Stadium on April 30.

== Results ==
Rank	Athlete	Nationality	#1	#2	#3	#4	#5	#6	Result	Notes
1st place, gold medalist(s)	Marwa Hussein	Egypt	59.28	x	x	61.49	62.26	x	62.26	
2nd place, silver medalist(s)	Florence Ezeh	Togo	49.75	54.34	57.24	x	x	61.26	61.26	NR
3rd place, bronze medalist(s)	Susan Olufunke Adeoye	Nigeria	55.70	57.02	x	x	56.05	55.61	57.02	
4	Georgina Toth	Cameroon	x	51.84	54.56	51.43	x	55.72	55.72	NR
5	Marizette Badenhorst	South Africa	50.03	x	48.38	48.98	x	50.80	50.80	
6	Rana Taha	Egypt	x	50.34	x	46.37	47.49	x	50.34	
7	Mouna Dani	Morocco	x	x	47.67	x	x	x	47.67	
8	Karin le Roux	South Africa	44.47	x	46.02	x	x	47.37	47.37	
	Blessing Egwu	Nigeria							DNS	
