= Athletics at the 2007 All-Africa Games – Women's hammer throw =

The women's hammer throw at the 2007 All-Africa Games was held on July 19.

== Results ==
Rank	Athlete	Nationality	Result	Notes
1st place, gold medalist(s)	Marwa Hussein	Egypt	65.70	
2nd place, silver medalist(s)	Susan Olufunke Adeoye	Nigeria	64.04	
3rd place, bronze medalist(s)	Florence Ezeh	Togo	59.55	
4	Vivian Chukwuemeka	Nigeria	58.15	
5	Amina Saada	Algeria	51.71	
