= Florence Ezeh =

French athlete (born 1977)

Medal record

Women's athletics

Representing Togo

African Championships
Silver medal – second place	2008 Addis Ababa	Hammer throw
Bronze medal – third place	2010 Nairobi	Hammer throw

Florence Edem Apefa Ezeh (born 29 December 1977 in Lomé) is a female hammer thrower from Togo, who previously represented France during her career. She set her personal best (68.03 metres) on 9 August 2002 at the European Championships in Munich. Ezeh attended the Southern Methodist University in Dallas, Texas.

== Biography ==
A student at the Southern Methodist University at Dallas, she won the NCAA championships in 1999, 2000 and 2001. Competing for Athlé 78 up to 1995, then the Racing Club de France from 1996 to 2004, then the CA Montreuil 93 at the end of 1995, she had an outstanding season in 1999 by winning the Hammer Throw at the 1999 European Championships U23s, at Gothenburg, with a hurl of 64.56m. She set six times the Senior French record of the Hammer Throw: 56.52m 8 July 1995 at Bondoufle, 57.74m 29 June 1996 at Montgeron, 58.28m 31 July 1996 at Lamballe, 65.15m and 65.41m 20 March 1999 at Austin (Texas) and 66.13m 7 May 1999 at Denton.

In 2001, she won the Gold Medal at the Mediterranean Games, and made the final of the World Championships at Edmonton (7th). The following year, she was fourth at the European Championships at Munich and established the best hurl of her career (68.03m).

Possessing double nationality, (Franco-Togolese), she decided to compete for her country of birth at the end of season 2005. Seventh at the Games of the Francophony, she placed third representing Togo at the 2007 All-Africa Games with a medal winning distance of 59.55 metres (195 ft 4 in), but was given the silver medal after second placed Funke Adeyoye was disqualified after testing positive in a dope test. She subsequently placed third at the 2007 African Games, second at the 2008 African Championships, then third at the following African Championships, in 2010. She holds the Togo record for the Hammer Throw (62.75m).

== Achievements ==
Year	Competition	Venue	Position	Notes
Representing France
1998	European Championships	Budapest, Hungary	14th (q)	58.72 m
1999	European U23 Championships	Gothenburg, Sweden	1st	64.56 m
1999	World Championships	Seville, Spain	16th (q)	60.74 m
2001	Jeux de la Francophonie	Ottawa, Canada	3rd	64.53 m
2001	World Championships	Edmonton, Canada	7th	65.88 m
2001	World Student Games	Beijing, PR China	7th	63.59 m
2001	Mediterranean Games	Radès, Tunisia	1st	64.59 m
2002	European Championships	Munich, Germany	4th	68.03 m (PB)
2003	World Championships	Paris, France	28th (q)	62.12 m
Representing Togo
2005	Jeux de la Francophonie	Niamey, Niger	7th	56.12 m
2007	All-Africa Games	Algiers, Algeria	2nd	59.55 m
2008	African Championships	Addis Ababa, Ethiopia	2nd	61.26 m
2009	World Championships	Berlin, Germany	38th (q)	59.76 m
2009	Jeux de la Francophonie	Beirut, Lebanon	8th	57.19 m
2010	African Championships	Nairobi, Kenya	3rd	57.94 m
2011	All-Africa Games	Maputo, Mozambique	10th	48.90 m

== See also ==
- List of nationality transfers in athletics
