= Oyesade Olatoye =

Nigerian-American athlete (born 1997)

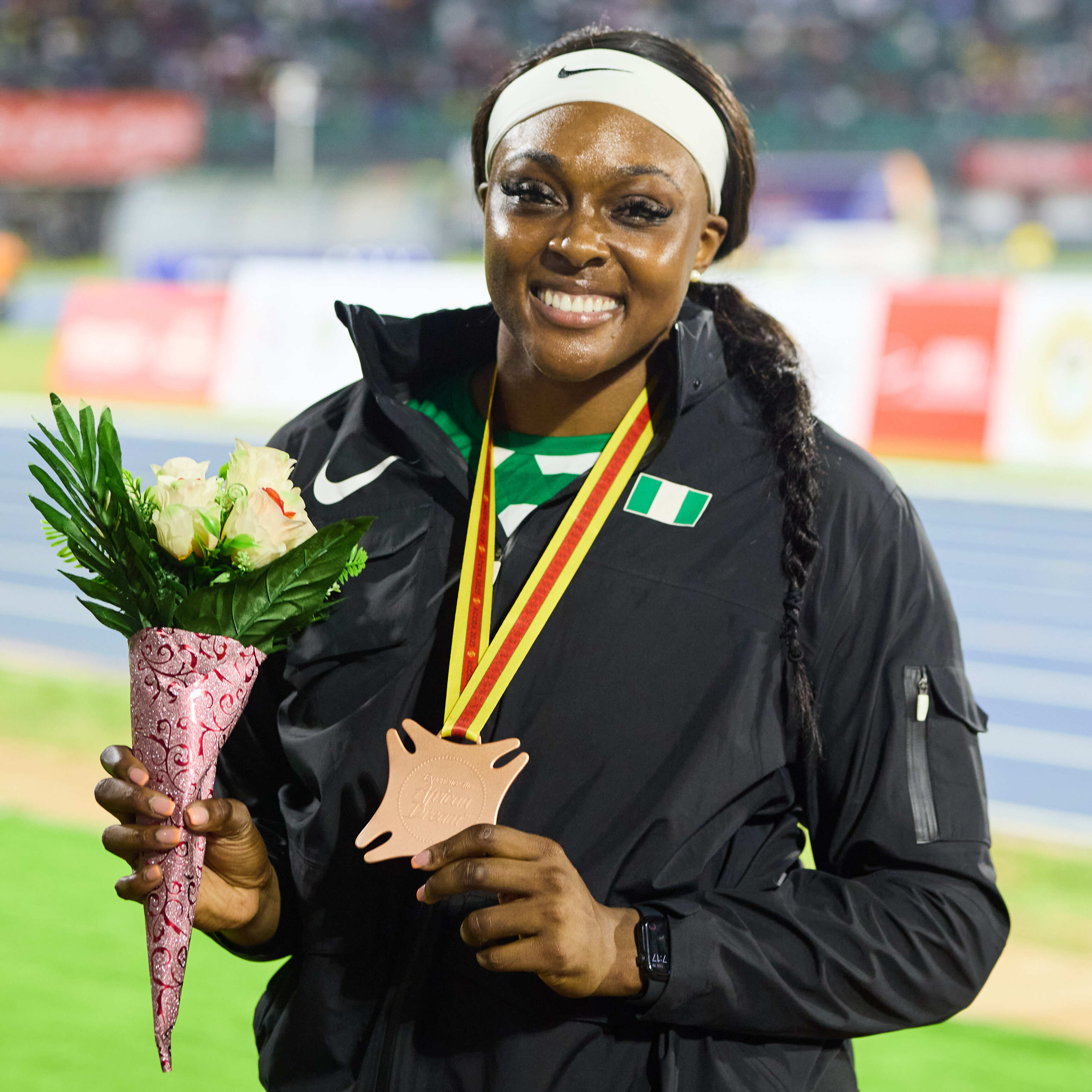
- Oyesade at the 2023 African Games

Personal information
- Nickname: Sade
- Nationality: American, Nigerian
- Born: 25 January 1997 (age 29) Cleveland, Ohio, U.S.
- Education: Ohio State University
- Height: 1.82 m (6 ft 0 in)

Sport
- Country: Nigeria
- Sport: Athletics
- Events: Shot put, hammer throw
- College team: Ohio State Buckeyes
Medal record
Women's athletics
Representing Nigeria
African Games
Silver medal – second place	2023 Accra	Shot put
Bronze medal – third place	2023 Accra	Hammer throw
African Championships
Gold medal – first place	2022 Saint Pierre	Hammer throw
Silver medal – second place	2024 Douala	Hammer throw
Silver medal – second place	2026 Accra	Hammer throw
Islamic Solidarity Games
Silver medal – second place	2025 Riyadh	Hammer throw

Oyesade "Sade" Olatoye (born 25 January 1997) is an Olympic athlete competing in the shot put and hammer throw. Born in the United States, she represents Nigeria internationally. She competed for her country of birth in 2016 at the IAAF World U20 Championships in Bydgoszcz, Poland. She switched allegiance from the United States to Nigeria in 2019. She represented Nigeria in the shot put at the 2019 World Championships in Doha, Qatar. Earlier that year, she won two medals at the 2019 African Games. Sade also competed at the 2024 Paris Olympics, representing Nigeria in the Hammer Throw.

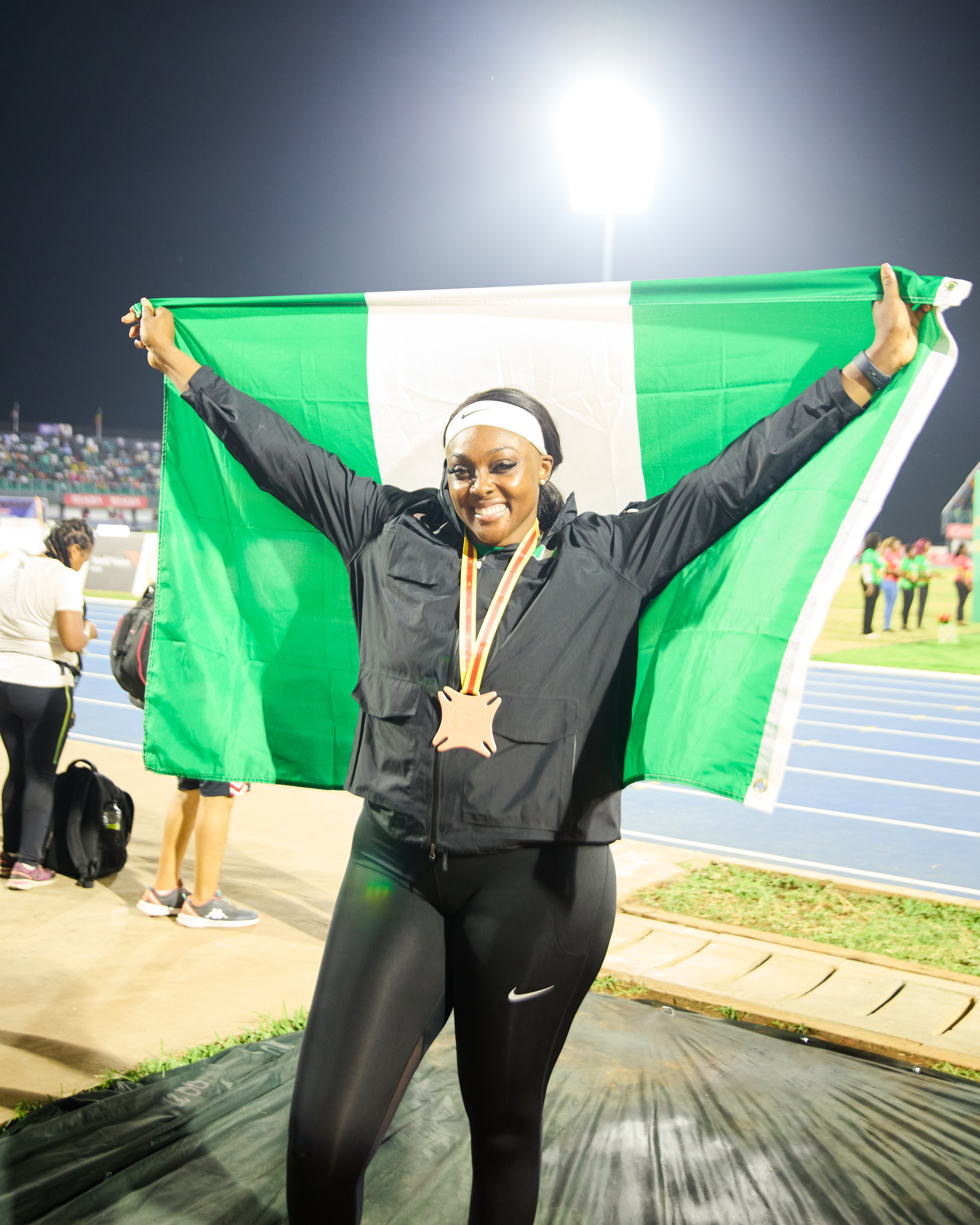
Oyesade pose with the Nigerian flag at the 2023 African Games in Accra, Ghana.

== Personal bests ==
Outdoor

- Shot put – 17.88 (Austin 2019)
- Discus throw – 56.68 (Bloomington 2021)
- Hammer throw – 69.89 (Columbus 2021)
- Weight throw – 25.32 (Nashville 2023)

Indoor

- Shot put – 17.88 (Ann Arbor 2019)

Event	Time/Mark	Venue	Date	Notes
Weight throw	24.46 m	Birmingham, Alabama, U.S.	9 March 2019	NCAA Champion, #3 All-time in the NCAA Weight list
Weight throw	25.32 m	Birmingham, Alabama, U.S.	10 February 2023	NR, #1 All-time
Shot Put (ind)	17.88 m	Big Ten Ch., Ann Arbor, Michigan, U.S.	23 February 2019	1st place, B1G Champion
Hammer throw	69.89 m	Jesse Owens Invitational, Jesse Owens Stadium, Columbus, Ohio, U.S.	30 April 2021	NR
Shot put (out)	17.88 m	NCAA Div. I Outdoor Championships, Austin, Texas, U.S.	6 June 2019	
Discus throw	56.68 m	Big Ten Invite #3, Billy Hayes T& F Complex, Bloomington, Indiana, U.S.	16 April 2021	

=== International competition ===
Year	Competition	Venue	Position	Event	Notes
Representing the United States
2016	World U20 Championships	Bydgoszcz, Poland	15th (q)	Hammer throw	58.52 m
Representing Nigeria
2019	African Games	Rabat, Morocco	DQ	Shot put	~~16.61 m~~
2019	African Games	Rabat, Morocco	DQ	Hammer throw	~~63.97 m~~
2019	World Championships	Doha, Qatar	26th (q)	Shot put	16.97 m
2022	African Championships	Port Louis, Mauritius	1st	Hammer throw	63.67 m
2022	World Championships	Eugene, United States	27th (q)	Hammer throw	65.71 m
2023	World Championships	Budapest, Hungary	30th (q)	Hammer throw	66.92 m
2024	African Games	Accra, Ghana	2nd	Shot put	16.61 m
2024	African Games	Accra, Ghana	3rd	Hammer throw	68.92 m
2024	African Championships	Douala, Cameroon	2nd	Hammer throw	67.72 m
2024	Olympic Games	Paris, France	29th (q)	Hammer throw	66.41 m
2025	World Championships	Tokyo, Japan	21st (q)	Hammer throw	68.82 m
2025	Islamic Solidarity Games	Riyadh, Saudi Arabia	2nd	Shot put	16.05 m
2025	Islamic Solidarity Games	Riyadh, Saudi Arabia	2nd	Hammer throw	63.34 m
2026	African Championships	Accra, Ghana	2nd	Hammer throw	69.60 m
2026	Commonwealth Games	Glasgow, United Kingdom	8th	Hammer throw	63.27 m

== Personal ==
Born to Oye and Ade Olatoye. Her parents are Nigerians from Ekiti State. She has three older siblings, Bisi, Femi And Deji Olatoye. Sade grew up in Ohio but visited Nigeria very frequently, during her childhood, to see her family. Coming from an athletically and academically gifted family, Olatoye excelled throughout her entire collegiate career on and off the field. She graduated from the School of Health and Rehabilitation sciences at the Ohio State University in Spring 2020 with a BSc in health and rehabilitation sciences. She pursued her master's degree at Ohio State during her last collegiate year of athletics, with a degree in bioethics through the College of Medicine. She completed her master's degree in the spring of 2023.

== Early life and development ==
Olatoye grew up in University Heights, Ohio a suburb of Cleveland, Ohio, concentrating mainly on basketball, only starting to participate in track and field in the seventh grade. She starred in both sports at Dublin Coffman High School. Though sidelined for 1/2 of her senior year by a torn ACL, she was an all-state basketball player while scoring and having over 1000 points and rebounds in her career. She holds her high school records in the shot put and discus and won 4 state individual championships in track and field. Olatoye was a scholarship athlete at the Ohio State University (OSU), starting her college career in 2016 as a track and field athlete.

== Career ==
=== Pre-collegiate ===
Olatoye attended Dublin Coffman High School in Dublin, Ohio. Olatoye was district champion several times and a three-time OHSAA Division I state outdoor champion (shot put, 2014–15 and discus, 2014), 2015 state runner-up in the discus, runner-up in the shot put at the 2013 OHSAA Championships and third as a freshman in 2012, fourth place in the discus and 14th in the shot put at the 2015 New Balance Outdoor Nationals, Ranked No. 7 in US in the girl's discus and No. 8 in the shot put as a senior in 2015.
