= 2004 African Championships in Athletics – Women's hammer throw =

The women's hammer throw event at the 2004 African Championships in Athletics was held in Brazzaville, Republic of the Congo on July 17.

== Results ==
Rank	Name	Nationality	Result	Notes
1st place, gold medalist(s)	Marwa Hussein	Egypt	66.14	CR
2nd place, silver medalist(s)	Mouna Dani	Morocco	59.78	
3rd place, bronze medalist(s)	Hayat El Ghazi	Morocco	57.67	
