= Xena Ngomateke =

Central African Republic athlete (born 1998)

Personal information
- Nationality: Central African Republic
- Born: 26 August 1998 (age 27)

Sport
- Sport: Athletics
- Event: Hammer throw

Achievements and titles
- Personal best(s): Hammer: 69.15m (Troyes, 2023)
Medal record
Women's athletics
Representing Central African Republic
African Championships
Bronze medal – third place	2024 Douala	Hammer

Xena Ngomateke (born 26 August 1998) is a hammer thrower who represents the Central African Republic. She was a bronze medalist at the 2024 African Championships.

== Career ==
Ngomateke is a member of the Entente Franconville Césame Val-d'Oise, in France. She finished third at the 2022 French Winter Throwing Championships in Salon-de-Provence. She won the silver medal in the hammer throw at the 2022 French Athletics Championships in Caen.

Ngomateke was runner-up in the hammer throw at the French Winter Throwing Championships in Salon-de-Provence in 2023. She threw a personal best of 69.15 metres on the 1 July 2023 in Troyes. She was runner-up again in the hammer throw at the 2023 French Athletics Championships in Albi in July 2023.

In June 2024, she was a bronze medalist in the hammer throw at the African Championships in Douala, Cameroon.
