= 2016 African Championships in Athletics – Women's hammer throw =

The women's hammer throw event at the 2016 African Championships in Athletics was held on 22 June in Kings Park Stadium.

== Results ==
| Rank | Athlete | Nationality | Result | Notes |
|---|---|---|---|---|
| 1st place, gold medalist(s) | Amy Sène | Senegal | 68.35 | CR |
| 2nd place, silver medalist(s) | Lætitia Bambara | Burkina Faso | 68.12 | |
| 3rd place, bronze medalist(s) | Sarah Bensaad | Tunisia | 62.53 | |
| 4 | Soukaina Zakkour | Morocco | 61.85 | |
| 5 | Zouina Bouzebra | Algeria | 61.62 | NR |
| 6 | Jennifer Batu | Congo | 60.00 | |
| 7 | Mara Cumming | South Africa | 55.48 | |
| 8 | Aya Adly | Egypt | 55.40 | |
| 9 | Chene Coetzee | South Africa | 50.46 | |
| 10 | Rebecca Kerubo | Kenya | 48.68 | |
| 11 | Andrea Vahoua | Ivory Coast | 48.18 | |
| 12 | Melissa Arlanda | Mauritius | 45.89 | |
| 13 | Adtridge Samoisy | Mauritius | 44.50 | |
| | Stefanie Greyling | South Africa | DNS | |
