= Sarah Bensaad =

French-Tunisian hammer thrower

Medal record

Women's athletics

Representing Tunisia

African Championships
Bronze medal – third place	2012 Porto-Novo	Hammer throw
Bronze medal – third place	2014 Marrakesh	Hammer throw
Bronze medal – third place	2016 Durban	Hammer throw

Sarah Bensaad (born 27 January 1987) is a French-Tunisian hammer thrower.

Representing France, she competed at the 2006 World Junior Championships without reaching the final and finished tenth at the 2009 European U23 Championships. She then switched her allegiance to Tunisia.

She won the gold medal at the 2011 Pan Arab Games, the silver medal at the 2011 All-Africa Games and the bronze medals at the 2012, 2014 and 2016 African Championships. She also finished ninth at the 2013 Jeux de la Francophonie

Her personal best throw is 65.93 metres, achieved in April 2014 in Bobigny.
