= Athletics at the 2015 African Games – Women's hammer throw =

The women's hammer throw event at the 2015 African Games was held on 14 September.

== Results ==
Rank	Name	Nationality	#1	#2	#3	#4	#5	#6	Result	Notes
1st place, gold medalist(s)	Lætitia Bambara	Burkina Faso	x	61.85	66.23	66.91	x	66.11	66.91	GR, NR
2nd place, silver medalist(s)	Amy Sène	Senegal	x	62.94	63.64	62.28	x	59.72	63.64	
3rd place, bronze medalist(s)	Jennifer Batu Bawsitika	Republic of the Congo	62.13	59.10	x	x	57.96	60.27	62.13	NR
4	Zouina Bouzebra	Algeria	59.16	55.57	x	x	x	53.04	59.16	
5	Precious Ogunleye	Nigeria	58.84	x	x	x	x	56.14	58.84	
6	Rebecca Kerubo	Kenya	45.03	x	51.19	x	x	48.13	51.19	SB
	Rebecca Famurewa	Nigeria							DNS	
