= Athletics at the 2023 African Games – Women's hammer throw =

The women's hammer throw event at the 2023 African Games was held on 19 March 2024 in Accra, Ghana.

== Medalists ==
Gold	Silver	Bronze
Zahra Tatar; Algeria	Zouina Bouzebra; Algeria	Oyesade Olatoye; Nigeria

== Results ==
Held on 19 March

Rank	Name	Nationality	#1	#2	#3	#4	#5	#6	Result	Notes
1st place, gold medalist(s)	Zahra Tatar	Algeria	x	68.53	x	x	69.65	x	69.65	GR
2nd place, silver medalist(s)	Zouina Bouzebra	Algeria	67.32	65.82	67.87	68.97	66.79	67.16	68.97	
3rd place, bronze medalist(s)	Oyesade Olatoye	Nigeria	61.12	58.88	68.56	68.23	63.34	68.92	68.92	
4	Collette Uys	South Africa	57.07	x	x	57.43	62.35	60.50	62.35	
5	Rawan Ayman	Egypt	58.57	59.11	57.71	58.96	60.82	60.73	60.82	
6	Roseline Rakamba	Kenya	x	53.00	47.47	53.28	54.28	x	54.28	
7	Emilie Dia	Mali	48.28	x	52.17	45.35	48.98	47.87	52.17	
8	Michelle Koussalouka	Republic of the Congo	x	x	x	47.59	46.96	45.81	47.59	
