= Amy Sène =

French-born Senegalese hammer thrower

Personal information
- Born: 6 April 1986 (age 40) Lorient, France
- Height: 1.70 m (5 ft 7 in)
- Weight: 65 kg (143 lb)

Sport
- Country: Senegal
- Sport: Athletics
- Event: Hammer throw
Medal record
Women's athletics
Representing Senegal
All-Africa Games
Gold medal – first place	2011 Maputo	Hammer throw
Silver medal – second place	2015 Brazzaville	Hammer throw
African Championships
Gold medal – first place	2010 Nairobi	Hammer throw
Gold medal – first place	2012 Porto-Novo	Hammer throw
Gold medal – first place	2016 Durban	Hammer throw
Silver medal – second place	2014 Marrakesh	Hammer throw
- Updated on 25 June 2016

Amy Sène (born 6 April 1986) is a French-born Senegalese track and field athlete who competes in the hammer throw. She is the African record holder with her personal best of 69.70 metres. Sène is a three-time winner at the African Championships and was the gold medallist at the 2011 All-Africa Games and silver medallist at the 2015 All-Africa Games. She also competed at the 2012 Summer Olympics and the 2016 Summer Olympics.

== Life and career ==
Born in Lorient to Senegalese parents, she opted to represent Senegal internationally from 2010 onwards. Training with the Stade Rennais Athletisme club, she was the 2005 French junior champion and competed for her country of birth at the 2007 European Athletics U23 Championships. She cleared sixty metres for the first time that year, setting a personal best of 62.00 m in June. She improved to 63.44 m in 2009 and won the French universities championship in Nice in 2010.

Following her transfer to Senegal at the end of 2009, she went on to break the Senegalese record five times in 2010, culminating in a personal best of 64.11 m to win the gold medal at the 2010 African Championships in Athletics. She brought an end to Marwa Hussein's eight-year dominance of the event. She bettered her own record four more times in 2011, with a throw of 68.45 m in Tomblaine being her season's best. She gained selection for the 2011 World Championships in Athletics and threw 66.15 m in the qualifiers in what was Senegal's first hammer throw appearance at the competition. She ended her year with a gold medal at the 2011 All-Africa Games.

Sène broke the African record at the 2012 French Athletics Championships with her clearance of 69.10 m for third place. Following her continental record, she retained her hammer title at the 2012 African Championships in Athletics.

After she lost her African double title (African Championships at Marrakesh 2014 and All Africa Games 2015), she came back and won the gold medal at 2016 African Championships in Athletics Durban 2016. She broke the African championships record of Marhwa Hussein with 68.35 m.

== Competition record ==
Year	Competition	Venue	Position	Notes
Representing France
2007	European U23 Championships	Debrecen, Hungary	16th (q)	57.85 m
Representing Senegal
2010	African Championships	Nairobi, Kenya	1st	64.11 m (NR)
2011	World Championships	Daegu, South Korea	23rd (q)	66.15 m
2011	All-Africa Games	Maputo, Mozambique	1st	61.48 m
2012	African Championships	Porto-Novo, Benin	1st	65.55 m
2012	Olympic Games	London, United Kingdom	32nd (q)	65.49 m
2013	World Championships	Moscow, Russia	23rd (q)	65.58 m
2013	Jeux de la Francophonie	Nice, France	7th	65.13 m
2014	African Championships	Marrakesh, Morocco	2nd	64.66 m
2015	African Games	Brazzaville, Republic of the Congo	2nd	63.64 m
2016	African Championships	Durban, South Africa	1st	68.35 m
2016	Olympic Games	Rio de Janeiro, Brazil	25th (q)	64.83 m
