= Athletics at the 2017 Jeux de la Francophonie =

Athletics at the 8th Jeux de la Francophonie
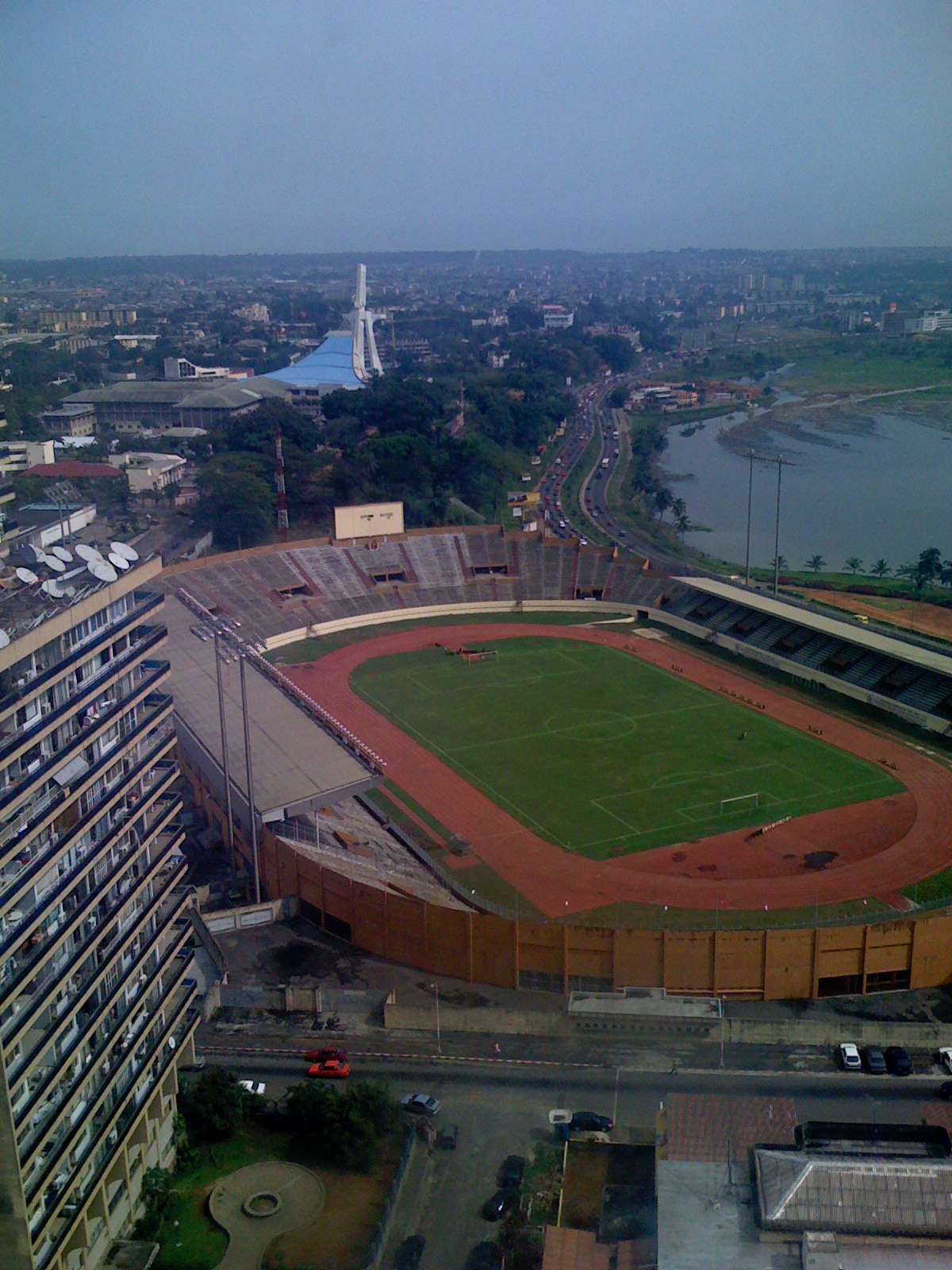
- Host stadium in Abidjan.
- Dates: 23–27 July 2017
- Host city: Abidjan, Ivory Coast
- Venue: Stade Félix Houphouët-Boigny
- Events: 42
- Participation: 347 athletes from 35 nations
- Records set: 1 GR

The athletics competition at the 2017 Jeux de la Francophonie took place in Stade Félix Houphouët-Boigny in Abidjan from 23 to 27 July 2017.

== Medalists ==
=== Men ===
Event	Gold		Silver		Bronze	
100 m	Dylan Sicobo; Seychelles	10.33 NR	Arthur Cissé; Ivory Coast	10.34	Bismark Boateng; Canada	10.41
200 m	Wilfried Koffi Hua; Ivory Coast	20.73	Arthur Cissé; Ivory Coast	20.93	Bastien Mouthon; Switzerland	21.20
400 m	Benjamin Ayesu-Attah; Canada	46.43	Bienvenue Sawadogo; Burkina Faso	46.89	Ibrahima Mbengue; Senegal	47.10
800 m	Oussama Nabil; Morocco	1:46.14	Mostafa Smaili; Morocco	1:46.73	Riadh Chninni; Tunisia	1:47.39
1500 m	Fouad Elkaam; Morocco	3:46.42	Brahim Kaazouzi; Morocco	3:47.13	Hicham Ouladha; Morocco	3:48.14
5000 m	Younès Essalhi; Morocco	14:11.60	Soufiyan Bouqantar; Morocco	14:11.62	Youssouf Hiss Bachir; Djibouti	14:11.98
10,000 m	Soufiyan Bouqantar; Morocco	29:39.07	Jamal Hitrane; Morocco	29:40.25	Mohamed Reda El Aaraby; Morocco	29:42.12
110 m hurdles	Loïc Herkenrath; France	13.74	Sekou Kaba; Canada	13.81	Nicolas Borome; France	13.94
400 m hurdles	Jordin Andrade; Cape Verde	49.66	Amadou Ndiaye; Senegal	50.17	Thomas Delmestre; France	50.66
3000 m steeplechase	Mohamed Tindouft; Morocco	8:44.69	Hicham Sigueni; Morocco	8:45.27	Mohamed Amin Jhinaoui; Tunisia	8:53.76
4 × 100 m relay	Ivory Coast; Francis Koné Gogbeu; Arthur Cissé; Émilien Tchan Bi Chan; Wilfried Koffi Hua	39.39	Canada; Lucanus Robinson; Likembe Francis Molango; Bismark Boateng; Benjamin Williams	40.16	Seychelles; Sharry Dodin; Dylan Sicobo; Ned Azemia; Leeroy Henriette	40.31 NR
4 × 400 m relay	Switzerland; Bastien Mouthon; Joël Burgunder; Silvan Lutz; Daniele Angelella; Vincent Notz*	3:10.70	Senegal; David Leon Basse; Ibrahima Mbengue; Mamadou Cissé Ndiaye; Amadou Ndiaye; Oumar Babou*	3:10.98	France; Loïc Herkenrath; Mickaël François; Pierrick Godefroy; Thomas Delmestre; Nicolas Borome*	3:12.23
Marathon	Makorobondo Salukombo; DR Congo	2:27:54	Fatihi Abdenasir; Morocco	2:28:06	Daouda Korongou; Benin	2:41:16
20 km race walk	Antonin Boyez; France	1:30:44	Andrei Gafita; Romania	1:35:12	Jerome Erick Caprice; Mauritius	1:39:06
High jump	Sean Cate; Canada	2.20 m	Fernand Djoumessi; Cameroon	2.18 m	Alhaji Mansaray; Canada	2.16 m
Pole vault	Baptiste Boirie; France	5.40 m	Stanley Joseph; France	5.40 m	Deryk Theodore; Canada	5.30 m
Long jump	Raihau Maiau; France	7.90 m	Mamadou Gueye; Senegal	7.86 m	Mouhcine Khoua; Morocco	7.65 m
Triple jump	Hugues Fabrice Zango; Burkina Faso	16.92 m	Kevin Luron; France	16.76 m	Mamadou Chérif Dia; Mali	16.59 m =NR
Shot put	Franck Elemba; Congo	19.99 m	Bob Bertemes; Luxembourg	19.55 m	Bernard Baptiste; Mauritius	17.56 m
Discus throw	El Bachir Mbarki; Morocco	57.14 m	Marc-Antoine Lafrenaye-Dugas; Quebec	51.10 m	Essohounamondom Tchalim; Togo	50.47 m
Javelin throw	George Zaharia; Romania	74.67 m	Alexandru Novac; Romania	68.85 m	Tom Reuter; Luxembourg	64.40 m
Decathlon	Taylor Stewart; Canada	7852 pts	Ruben Gado; France	7839 pts	Rostam Turner; Canada	7235 pts

* Medalists who participated in heats only.

=== Women ===
Event	Gold		Silver		Bronze	
100 m	Natacha Ngoye Akamabi; Congo	11.56	Marie Gisele Eleme Asse; Cameroon	11.59	Samantha Dagry; Switzerland	11.68
200 m	Natacha Ngoye Akamabi; Congo	23.69	Sarah Atcho; Switzerland	24.14	Naomi Van den Broeck; Wallonia	24.24
400 m	Djénébou Danté; Mali	52.23	Natassha McDonald; Canada	52.34	Assia Raziki; Morocco	52.98
800 m	Malika Akkaoui; Morocco	2:00.71 GR	Noélie Yarigo; Benin	2:01.27	Siham Hilali; Morocco	2:02.40
1500 m	Rababe Arafi; Morocco	4:17.23	Malika Akkaoui; Morocco	4:17.36	Siham Hilali; Morocco	4:18.87
5000 m	Soukaina Atanane; Morocco	16:00.36	Kaoutar Farkoussi; Morocco	16:01.53	Roxana Bârcă; Romania	16:07.61
10,000 m	Roxana Bârcă; Romania	35:31.13	Hanane Qallouj; Morocco	35:34.69	Monica Madalina Florea; Romania	35:38.37
100 m hurdles	Marthe Koala; Burkina Faso	13.32	Pauline Lett; France	13.32	Ashlea Elaine Maddex; Canada	13.44
400 m hurdles	Maëva Contion; France	57.38	Anaïs Lufutucu; France	58.24	Farah Clerc; France	58.60
3000 m steeplechase	Fadwa Sidi Madane; Morocco	9:44.11	Oumaima Saoud; Morocco	10:10.53	Marwa Bouzayani; Tunisia	10:10.78
4 × 100 m relay	Ivory Coast; Karel Elodie Ziketh; Mireille-Parfaite Gaha; Adeline Gouenon; Marie-Josée Ta Lou	44.22	Cameroon; Germaine Abessolo Bivina; Marie-Gisèle Eleme Asse; Charifa Abdoullahi Labarang; Fanny Appes Ekanga	45.23	Canada; Natasha Brown; Émy Béliveau; Leah Walkeden; Khadijah Valentine	45.84
Marathon	Shelley Doucet; New Brunswick	2:51:14	Fatiha Benchatki; Morocco	3:13:44	none awarded	
20 km race walk	Marine Quennehen; France	1:45:35	Amandine Marcou; France	1:50:30	Mihaela Puscasu; Romania	1:53:45
High jump	Lissa Labiche; Seychelles	1.91 m	Claire Orcel; Wallonia	1.88 m	Cathy Zimmer; Luxembourg	1.70 m
Pole vault	Pascale Stöcklin; Switzerland	4.10 m	Marion Lotout; France	4.00 m	Paige Ridout; Canada	3.95 m
Long jump	Marthe Koala; Burkina Faso	6.52 m NR	Joëlle Mbumi Nkouindjin; Cameroon	6.34 m	Fatim Affessi; Switzerland	6.17 m
Triple jump	Caroline Ehrhardt; Canada	13.83 m	Joëlle Mbumi Nkouindjin; Cameroon	13.58 m	Cristina Bujin; Romania	13.20 m
Shot put	Auriol Dongmo Mekemnang; Cameroon	17.68 m	Carine Mekam Ndong; Gabon	15.34 m	Alex Porlier-Langlois; Quebec	15.24 m
Hammer throw	Bianca Perie; Romania	67.79 m	Lauren Stuart; Canada	65.48 m	Bianca Lazar Fazecas; Romania	63.56 m
Javelin throw	Pascale Dumont; Quebec	52.16 m	Kénéfing Traoré; Mali	49.85 m	Nadja-Marie Pasternack; Switzerland	49.20 m

== Medal table ==
Rank	Nation	Gold	Silver	Bronze	Total
1	Morocco (MAR)	10	11	6	27
2	France (FRA)	6	7	4	17
3	Canada (CAN)	4	4	7	15
4	Romania (ROU)	3	2	5	10
5	Ivory Coast (CIV)	3	2	0	5
6	Burkina Faso (BUR)	3	1	0	4
7	Congo (CGO)	3	0	0	3
8	Switzerland (SUI)	2	1	4	7
9	Seychelles (SEY)	2	0	1	3
10	Cameroon (CMR)	1	5	0	6
11	Mali (MLI)	1	1	1	3
11	Quebec (QBC)	1	1	1	3
13	Cape Verde (CPV)	1	0	0	1
13	DR Congo (COD)	1	0	0	1
13	New Brunswick	1	0	0	1
16	Senegal (SEN)	0	3	1	4
17	Luxembourg (LUX)	0	1	2	3
18	Benin (BEN)	0	1	1	2
18	Wallonia	0	1	1	2
20	Gabon (GAB)	0	1	0	1
21	Tunisia (TUN)	0	0	3	3
22	Mauritius (MRI)	0	0	2	2
23	Djibouti (DJI)	0	0	1	1
23	Togo (TOG)	0	0	1	1
Totals (24 entries)		42	42	41	125

== Participating nations ==
- Armenia (4)
- Benin (9)
- Burkina Faso (12)
- Cambodia (1)
- Cameroon (12)
- Canada (56)
- Cape Verde (3)
- Central African Republic (4)
- Chad (5)
- Comoros (3)
- Congo (9)
- DR Congo (5)
- Djibouti (4)
- France (26)
- Gabon (3)
- Guinea (3)
- Ivory Coast (21)
- Kosovo (3)
- Laos (2)
- Lebanon (8)
- Luxembourg (11)
- Madagascar (12)
- Mali (5)
- Mauritius (13)
- Morocco (30)
- New Brunswick (7)
- Niger (4)
- Quebec (12)
- Romania (15)
- Senegal (13)
- Seychelles (5)
- Switzerland (15)
- Togo (4)
- Tunisia (4)
- Wallonia (4)
