= Élise Trynkler =

French sprinter

Personal information
- Nationality: French
- Born: 19 December 1992 (age 32)

Sport
- Sport: Athletics
- Event: Sprinting

Élise Trynkler (born 19 December 1992) is a French athlete. She competed in the women's 4 × 400 metres relay event at the 2019 World Athletics Championships.
