= Hayat El Ghazi =

Moroccan hammer thrower (born 1979)

Personal information
- Nationality: Moroccan
- Born: 1979 (age 46–47)
- Occupation: Moroccan hammer thrower
Medal record
Women's athletics
Representing Morocco
African Championships
| Bronze medal – third place | 2002 Radès | Hammer throw |
| Bronze medal – third place | 2004 Brazzaville | Hammer throw |

Hayat El Ghazi (born 1979) is a Moroccan hammer thrower.

She won the bronze medals at the 2002 and 2004 African Championships. In 2003, she threw a national record throw of 60.43 metres.

In 2007 El Ghazi was found guilty of norandrosterone doping. The sample was delivered on 10 August 2006 at the 2006 African Championships in Bambous, Mauritius, where she originally won the silver medal. She received a suspension from September 2006 to September 2008, as well as disqualification of all results accomplished since the day she was tested.

== See also ==
- List of sportspeople sanctioned for doping offenses
