= Bismark Boateng =

Canadian athlete (born 1992)

Personal information
- Nationality: Canadian
- Born: March 15, 1992 (age 34) Accra, Ghana
- Home town: Toronto, Ontario, Canada
- Height: 175 cm (5 ft 9 in)
- Weight: 76 kg (168 lb)

Sport
- Sport: Athletics
- Events: 100 m, 200 m

Achievements and titles
- Personal bests: 100 m: 10.14 (2018); 200 m: 20.67 (2021)
Medal record
Men's track and field
Representing Canada
NACAC Championships
Gold medal – first place	2018 Toronto	4 × 100 m relay
Jeux de la Francophonie
Silver medal – second place	2017 Abidjan	4 × 100 m relay
Bronze medal – third place	2017 Abidjan	100 m

Bismark Boateng (born March 15, 1992) is a Canadian track and field athlete specializing in the sprint events. Born in Ghana, Boateng moved to Canada when he was 14 for better opportunities and lives in Toronto, Ontario.

== Career ==
Bismark studied at Monsignor Percy Johnson Catholic Secondary School in Etobicoke. Boateng was originally a soccer player, but decided to switch to track and field after watching the 2012 Canadian Olympic trials. Boateng started running competitively in 2013.

Boateng's first major competition was the 2015 Summer Universiade, where he finished in eleventh in the 100 m and tenth in the 4x100 relay. Boateng competed at the 2018 Commonwealth Games, where he made the semi-finals in the 200 m and was disqualified in the 4x100 relay.

At the 2018 NACAC Championships in his hometown of Toronto, Boateng was part of the gold medal 4x100 relay winning team.

In July 2021, Boateng was named to Canada's 2020 Olympic team in the men's 100 metres and 4x100 relay. He placed sixth in his heat with a time of 10.47, and did not advance. Speaking afterward, Boateng attributed this to an injury sustained at his prior competition, and said he felt the race went "pretty well."
