= Soukaina Zakkour =

Moroccan hammer thrower

Medal record

Women's athletics

Representing Morocco

African Championships
Gold medal – first place	2018 Asaba	Hammer throw

Soukaina Zakkour (born 13 October 1993) is a Moroccan hammer thrower.

She finished tenth at the 2014 African Championships, fourth at the 2016 African Championships and won the gold medal at the 2018 African Championships.

On the regional scene she won the bronze medal at the 2017 Islamic Solidarity Games, won the silver medal at the 2017 Arab Championships (also in the javelin throw), finished seventh at the 2017 Jeux de la Francophonie and seventh at the 2018 Mediterranean Games..

Her personal best throw is 63.10 metres, achieved at the 2017 Islamic Solidarity Games in Baku. This is the Moroccan record.
