= Todisoa Rabearison =

Madagascan sprinter

Personal information
- Full name: Todisoa Franck Rabearison
- Nationality: Malagasy
- Born: 3 February 1992 (age 34)

Sport
- Sport: Track and Field
- Event: 400 m
Medal record
Men's athletics
Representing Madagascar
Indian Ocean Island Games
| Gold medal – first place | 2019 Mauritius | 400m |

Todisoa Franck Rabearison (born 3 February 1992) is a Madagascan Olympic athlete.

He won the gold medal at the 2019 Indian Ocean Island Games in the 400 metres. He competed at the Athletics at the 2020 Summer Olympics – Men's 400 metres running a seasons best 48.40 but did not qualify from his heat.
