= Zouina Bouzebra =

Algerian hammer thrower (born 1990)

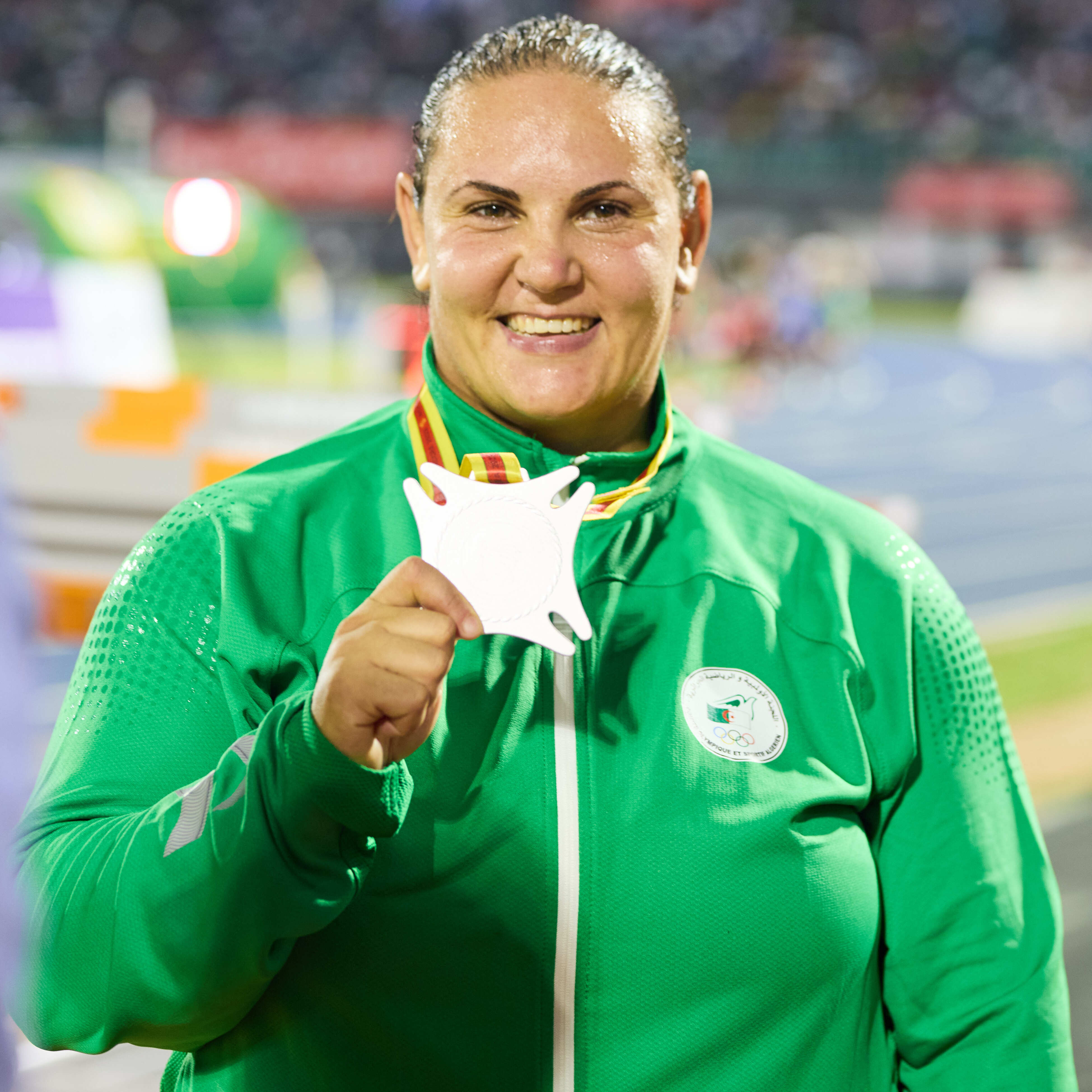
- Bouzebra at the 2023 African Games

Personal information
- Born: 3 October 1990 (age 35)

Sport
- Country: Algeria
- Sport: Athletics
- Event: Hammer throw
Medal record
Women's athletics
Representing Algeria
African Games
Silver medal – second place	2023 Accra	Hammer throw
Bronze medal – third place	2019 Rabat	Hammer throw
African Championships
Silver medal – second place	2022 Saint Pierre	Hammer throw
Bronze medal – third place	2024 Douala	Hammer throw
Mediterranean Games
Bronze medal – third place	2022 Oran	Hammer throw
Islamic Solidarity Games
Bronze medal – third place	2021 Konya	Hammer throw

Zouina Bouzebra (born 3 October 1990) is an Algerian hammer thrower.

== Career ==
Early in her career she doubled in the hammer throw and shot put, winning two medals at the 2009 African Junior Championships and achieving a seventh and sixth place at the 2010 African Championships.

Specializing in the hammer throw she finished sixth at the 2012 African Championships, fifth at the 2014 African Championships, fourth at the 2015 African Games and fifth at the 2016 African Championships. She has also won several medals at the Arab Athletics Championships, lastly a gold medal in 2017.

Her personal best throw is 65.20 metres, achieved in June 2021 in Radès This is the Algerian record.
