= Riadh Chninni =

Tunisian middle-distance runner

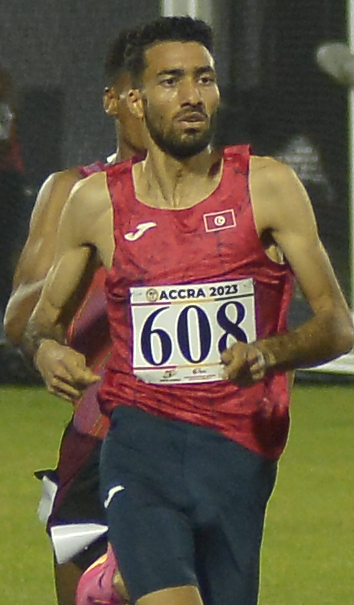
Riadh Chninni

Riadh Chninni (born 15 March 1997) is a Tunisian runner who specializes in the 800 metres.

In the 800 metres he finished fourth at the 2016 World U20 Championships, won the bronze medal at the 2017 Jeux de la Francophonie, the silver medal at the 2017 Islamic Solidarity Games, finished eighth at the 2018 Mediterranean Games and eighth at the 2018 African Championships. He also competed at the 2013 World Youth Championships (800 m) and the 2016 World U20 Championships (1500 m) without reaching the final.

His personal best times are 1:46.24 minutes in the 800 metres, achieved at the 2017 Islamic Solidarity Games in Baku; and 3:47.84 minutes in the 1500 metres, achieved at the 2016 World U20 Championships in Bydgoszcz.
