= Ben Williams (triple jumper) =

British triple jumper (born 1992)

Personal information
- Nationality: British (English)
- Born: 25 January 1992 (age 34) Stoke-on-Trent, England
- Height: 6’0
- Weight: 75 kg (165 lb)

Sport
- Sport: Athletics
- Event: Triple jump
- Club: Sale Harriers
- Coached by: Aston Moore and Femi Akinsanya

Achievements and titles
- Personal best: Triple jump: 17.27 m

Benjamin Williams (born 25 January 1992) is a British triple jumper, who won an individual gold medal at the 2009 World Youth Championships. He competed at the 2020 Summer Olympics.

== Biography ==
At the end of 2012 Williams won a scholarship to the University of Louisville in January 2013.

As a result of a knee injury, he has missed out on the London 2012 Olympic Games, the Rio 2016 Olympics, and the 2018 Commonwealth Games.

His personal best jump is 17.14m. He achieved this at the European Athletics Team Championships in Bydgoszcz, Poland on 11 August 2019, securing qualification for the World Championships in Doha, in September 2019, and for the 2020 Summer Olympics in Tokyo. His previous best was 16.74 metres, achieved in June 2015 in Eugene. He almost managed to equal that when jumping 16.73 metres at the 2017 European Team Championships Super League, finishing second.

Williams is a four-times British triple jump champion after winning the British Athletics Championships in 2017, 2019, 2021 and 2022.
