= Fadwa Sidi Madane =

Moroccan middle-distance runner

Personal information
- Nationality: Moroccan
- Born: 20 November 1994 (age 31)
- Height: 1.75 m (5 ft 9 in)
- Weight: 56 kg (123 lb)

Sport
- Country: Morocco
- Sport: Track and field
- Event: 3000 metres steeplechase
Medal record
Women's athletics
Representing Morocco
Jeux de la Francophonie
Gold medal – first place	2017 Abidjan	3000 m s'chase

Fadwa Sidi Madane (born 20 November 1994) is a Moroccan middle-distance runner. She competed in the 3000 metres steeplechase event at the 2015 World Championships in Athletics in Beijing, China.

In 2017, she competed in the women's 3000 metres steeplechase event at the 2017 World Championships in Athletics held in London, United Kingdom. She did not advance to the final.
