= Makorobondo Salukombo =

Congolese long-distance runner

Personal information
- Born: 13 August 1988 (age 37)

Sport
- Country: Democratic Republic of the Congo
- Sport: Athletics
- College team: Denison University

Kamongwa Makorobondo Salukombo (born 13 August 1988) is a Congolese long-distance runner who specialises in the marathon.

Born in Zaire, he and his family fled the DRC in 2001 during the Second Congo War. They then spent 3 years in Uganda at a refugee camp. He and his family resettled in the Cleveland, OH area in 2004.

After graduating from Lakewood High School, he attended Denison University and graduated in 2012.

He competed in the men's marathon at the 2016 Summer Olympics. He won the gold medal at the 2017 Jeux de la Francophonie.
