= Marwa Hussein =

Egyptian hammer thrower (born 1978)

Medal record

Women's athletics

Representing Egypt

African Championships
Gold medal – first place	2002 Radès	Hammer throw
Gold medal – first place	2004 Brazzaville	Hammer throw
Gold medal – first place	2006 Bambous	Hammer throw
Gold medal – first place	2008 Addis Ababa	Hammer throw
Silver medal – second place	1998 Dakar	Hammer throw
Silver medal – second place	2000 Algiers	Hammer throw
Silver medal – second place	2010 Nairobi	Hammer throw

Marwa Ahmed Hussein Arafat (born 19 June 1978) is an Egyptian hammer thrower. Her personal best throw is 68.48 metres, achieved in February 2005 in Cairo. This is the Egyptian record, a former African record, and ranks her as the second best African thrower after Amy Sène.

She failed a drug test at a competition in August 2010 and was banned from the sport for two years.

== Achievements ==
Year	Competition	Venue	Position	Notes
Representing Egypt
1998	African Championships	Dakar, Senegal	2nd	
1999	All-Africa Games	Johannesburg, South Africa	3rd	
1999	Pan Arab Games	Irbid, Jordan	1st	58.97 CR
2000	African Championships	Algiers, Algeria	2nd	
2001	World Championships	Edmonton, Canada	30th (q)	58.41 m
2002	African Championships	Radès, Tunisia	1st	61.64 CR
2002	World Cup	Madrid, Spain	9th	
2003	All-Africa Games	Abuja, Nigeria	1st	64.28 m = CR
2003	World Championships	Paris, France	20th (q)	64.53 m
2004	African Championships	Brazzaville, Congo	1st	66.14 m = CR
2004	Olympic Games	Athens, Greece	38th (q)	62.27 m
2004	Pan Arab Games	Algiers, Algeria	1st	62.78 m = CR
2006	African Championships	Bambous, Mauritius	1st	
2006	World Cup	Athens, Greece	9th	60.23 m
2007	All-Africa Games	Algiers, Algeria	1st	65.70 m
2007	Pan Arab Games	Cairo, Egypt	1st	62.83 m
2008	African Championships	Addis Ababa, Ethiopia	1st	62.26 m
2010	African Championships	Nairobi, Kenya	2nd	62.36 m

== See also ==
- List of doping cases in athletics
