= Leandri Holtzhausen =

South African athlete (born 1997)

Personal information
- Nationality: South African
- Born: Leandri Greel; 14 July 1997 (age 28)

Sport
- Sport: Athletics
- Event: Hammer throw

Achievements and titles
- Personal best(s): Hammer: 68.08 m (2025) Discus:50.95 m (2016); Shot Put: 12.70m (2015)
Medal record
Women's athletics
Representing South Africa
African Championships
Bronze medal – third place	2026 Accra	Hammer throw

Leandri Holtzhausen (née Greel born 14 July 1997) is a South African hammer and discus thrower.

== Biography ==
From Lindhaven, she was educated at Hoërskool Monument in Guateng. While competing as Leandri Greel in 2013, she was chosen to represent South Africa in the World Youth Athletics Championships, where she finished in seventh position in the girls discus throw and also represented South Africa at the 2014 Summer Youth Olympics. The following year, she won the discus throw at the 2015 African Junior Athletics Championships.

Greel placed sixth in the hammer throw at the 2022 African Athletics Championships in Saint Pierre, Mauritius. In April 2023, she set a new South African national record in the hammer throw of 66.11 metres, breaking the previous mark set by Phethisang Makhethe.

In 2024, she was the silver-medallist in the senior women's hammer throw at the South African Championships after throwing 61.32m to finish behind winner Colette Uys. She placed fourth in the hammer throw at the 2024 African Athletics Championships in Douala, Cameroon.

Holzhauser set a national record of 66.54m at a Central Gauteng Athletics league meeting in Germiston in February 2025. Competing in March 2025, she set another new South African record, throwing 67.95 metres in the hammer throw.

In April 2026, Holtzhausen won the women’s hammer throw at the South African Championships with a 67.70m throw. Holtzhausen won the bronze medal in the hammer throw at the 2026 African Championships in Athletics in Accra, Ghana.
