= Zahra Tatar =

Algerian hammer thrower (born 1992)

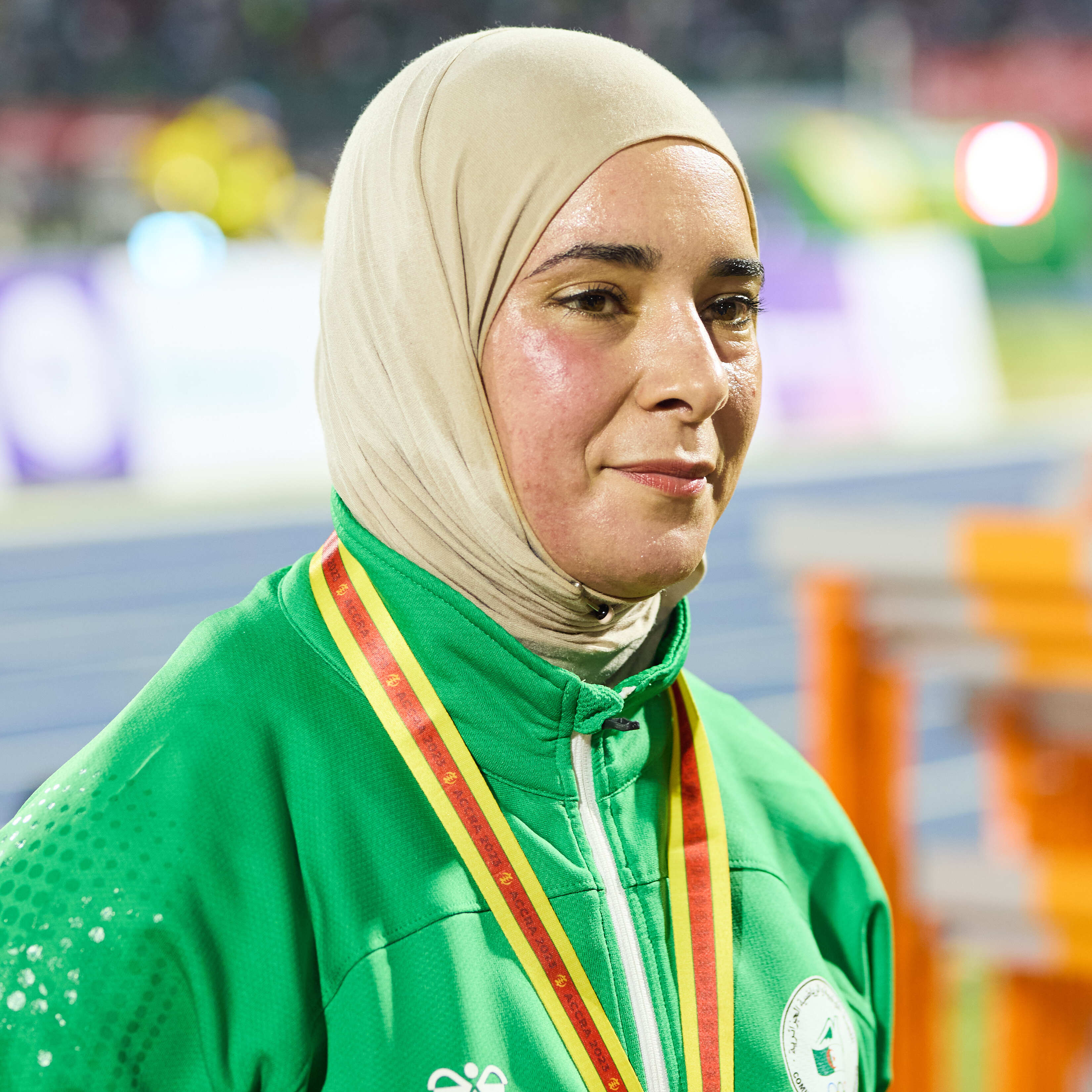
- Tatar at the 2023 African Games

Personal information
- Nationality: Algeria
- Born: 10 November 1992 (age 33)

Sport
- Sport: Athletics
- Event: Hammer throw
- Club: CR Belouizdad,(ALG)

Achievements and titles
- Personal best: Hammer throw 70.82 m RN(2025)
Medal record
Women's athletics
Representing Algeria
African Championships
Gold medal – first place	2026 Accra	Hammer throw
Gold medal – first place	2024 Yaoundé	Hammer throw
Arab Games
Gold medal – first place	2023 Algeria	Hammer throw
African Games
Gold medal – first place	2023 Ghana	Hammer throw
Islamic Solidarity Games
Gold medal – first place	2025 Riyadh	Hammer throw
Mediterranean Games
Bronze medal – third place	2026 Taranto	Hammer throw

Zahra Tatar (born 10 November 1992) is an Algerian hammer thrower. She competed in the 2024 Summer Olympics.
