= Queen Obisesan =

Nigerian hammer thrower

Personal information
- National team: Nigeria
- Born: September 15, 1982 (age 43) Festac Town
- Height: 178 cm (5 ft 10 in)
- Weight: 75 kg (165 lb)

Sport
- Country: Nigeria
- Sport: Hammer throw

Queen Obisesan (born 15 September 1982) is a Nigerian hammer thrower. She has competed at the African Championships in Athletics, the African Games and the Commonwealth Games.

== Early life ==
Obisesan was born on 15 September 1982, in Festac Town, Lagos State, Nigeria.

== Career ==
Obisesan came eighth in the 2010 African Championships in Athletics in the hammer throw. She set a new Nigerian national record in 2013, throwing 63.79 m. In 2014, in the Commonwealth Games in Glasgow she came thirteenth and in the African Championships in Marrakech her position was fourth. She came fifth in both the Commonwealth Games in Australia and the African Championships in 2018. She also beat her 2013 national record, throwing 65.01 m. In 2019, she came fifth in the 2019 African Games in Rabat and won the national competition with a throw of 65.19m.
