= 2018 IAAF Continental Cup – Results =

These are the results of the 2018 IAAF Continental Cup, which took place in Ostrava, Czech Republic on 8–9 September 2018.

== Men ==
=== Track ===
Events
100 m	200 m	400 m	800 m	1500 m	3000 m	110 m h	400 m h	3000 m st	4 × 100 m relay

==== Men's 100 metres ====
9 September

With a quick start, Su Bingtian gained the clear advantage, with =#2 of all time Yohan Blake the next contender. Blake steadily gained on Su, a metre up on a wall of the remaining competitors save a beaten Barakat Al-Harthi. Then 70 metres into the race, Blake suddenly pulled up, leaving Su all alone, with the year's new phenom Noah Lyles separating from the pack. Known more for the 200 metres, Lyles showed the late closing speed from the longer race, catching Su 5 metres out and on to the win. Akani Simbine separated from the group to take bronze.

Rank	Lane	Athlete	Nationality	Team	Result	Points	Notes
1	6	Noah Lyles	United States	Americas	10.01	8	
2	4	Su Bingtian	China	Asia-Pacific	10.03	7	
3	3	Akani Simbine	South Africa	Africa	10.11	6	
4	5	Jak Ali Harvey	Turkey	Europe	10.19	5	
5	7	Arthur Cissé	Ivory Coast	Africa	10.23	4	
6	8	Barakat Al-Harthi	Oman	Asia-Pacific	10.29	3	
7	1	Churandy Martina	Netherlands	Europe	10.36	2	
8	2	Yohan Blake	Jamaica	Americas	11.99	1	

Team Points

Rank	Team	Individual Points	Team Points	Notes
1	Asia-Pacific	10	7	
1	Africa	10	7	
3	Americas	9	4	
4	Europe	7	2	

==== Men's 200 metres ====
8 September

Ramil Guliyev came into the race with the fastest time of the field. From the gun, he took the lead, making up the stagger on Alonso Edward, to his outside 60 metres into the turn. Guliyev hit the straightaway with a metre lead, while Edward was just a nose ahead of Yuki Koike, Baboloki Thebe and Álex Quiñónez in the battle for second place. From there, rocking side to side, Edward powered away in a different gear from the others, catching Guliyev 30 metres from the finish line. Disadvantaged with the tight lane 1 turn, on the straightaway, Quiñónez was able to separate from Koike, while Thebe, known more for 400 metres, faded but still ran a personal best.

Rank	Lane	Athlete	Nationality	Team	Result	Points	Notes
1	5	Alonso Edward	Panama	Americas	20.19	8	
2	4	Ramil Guliyev	Turkey	Europe	20.28	7	
3	1	Álex Quiñónez	Ecuador	Americas	20.36	6	
4	3	Yuki Koike	Japan	Asia-Pacific	20.57	5	
5	8	Churandy Martina	Netherlands	Europe	20.68	4	
6	2	Ncincihli Titi	South Africa	Africa	20.78	3	
7	6	Baboloki Thebe	Botswana	Africa	20.79	2	SB
8	7	Joseph Millar	New Zealand	Asia-Pacific	21.68	1	

Team Points

Rank	Team	Individual Points	Team Points	Notes
1	Americas	14	8	
2	Europe	11	6	
3	Asia-Pacific	6	4	
4	Africa	5	2	

==== Men's 400 metres ====
9 September

Matthew Hudson-Smith took the lead through the first turn, marked by Abdalelah Haroun. Starting the race with his leg wrapped, Thapelo Phora pulled up 100 metres into the race, but rather than being assigned a DNF, he was disqualified for a lane violation for walking off the track. Down the back stretch, Haroun gained on Hudson-Smith taking the clear lead. Through the final turn, Baboloki Thebe asserted himself pull to even with Hudson-Smith 2 metres back of Haroun, with Luguelín Santos a metre back and Nathan Strother another metre behind him. Down the home stretch, Thebe made a run at Haroun, while Hudson-Smith and Santos went backward. Halfway down the home stretch, Thebe also started to tie up. Haroun glided across the line uncontested, Thebe's rush gave him enough of an advantage to hold off a fast closing Strother. And a late run by Mohammad Anas, caught Santos and almost caught Hudson-Smith, which became significant because this was the Asia-Pacific's Joker race, which they won and received the double points.

Rank	Lane	Athlete	Nationality	Team	Result	Points	Notes
1	4	Abdalelah Haroun	Qatar	Asia-Pacific	44.72	8	
2	3	Baboloki Thebe	Botswana	Africa	45.10	7	
3	6	Nathan Strother	United States	Americas	45.28	6	
4	5	Matthew Hudson-Smith	Great Britain	Europe	45.72	5	
5	8	Mohammad Anas	India	Asia-Pacific	45.72	4	
6	2	Luguelín Santos	Dominican Republic	Americas	45.81	3	
7	1	Kevin Borlée	Belgium	Europe	46.26	2	
	7	Thapelo Phora	South Africa	Africa	DQ	0	163.3(a)

Team Points

Rank	Team	Individual Points	Team Points	Notes
1	Asia-Pacific*	12	16	Joker
2	Americas	9	6	
3	Europe	7	3	
3	Africa	7	3	

==== Men's 800 metres ====
8 September

Andreas Kramer went to the lead at the break and held it through a modest 53.18 first lap, the rest of the field bunching up behind him. Down the back stretch, Emmanuel Korir edged into the lead, with Clayton Murphy on his shoulder and the field remaining bunched. Nijel Amos worked his way through the crowd to get to Murphy's back, the three starting to separate slightly from the rest of the pack. Amos moved to the outside to pass Murphy, but Murphy held his ground both athletes re-surging twice down the home stretch. Neither could make ground on the slight advantage of Korir who held on for the win, Murphy and Amos hitting the finish at the same time. The photo finish gave the silver to Murphy by 3 thousandths of a second.

Rank	Athlete	Nationality	Team	Result	Points	Notes
1	Emmanuel Korir	Kenya	Africa	1:46.50	8	
2	Clayton Murphy	United States	Americas	1:46.77	7	
3	Nijel Amos	Botswana	Africa	1:46.77	6	
4	Andreas Kramer	Sweden	Europe	1:47.03	5	
5	Michał Rozmys	Poland	Europe	1:47.05	4	
6	Jamal Hairane	Qatar	Asia-Pacific	1:47.93	3	
7	Jinson Johnson	India	Asia-Pacific	1:48.44	2	
8	Wesley Vázquez	Puerto Rico	Americas	1:49.60	1	

Team Points

Rank	Team	Individual Points	Team Points	Notes
1	Africa	14	8	
2	Europe	9	6	
3	Americas	8	4	
4	Asia-Pacific	5	2	

==== Men's 1500 metres ====
9 September

After the start sorted itself out, Drew Hunter emerged as the leader, trying to keep the field honest with a 60.76. After another 3/4 of a lap, Elijah Manangoi decided Hunter wasn't keeping up the pace and he went around. Seeing Manangoi hit the front, Jakob Ingebrigtsen played his hand and moved to the marking position, the two going through 800 in 2:03.52. As they approached the bell, Marcin Lewandowski moved to Ingebrigtsen's shoulder as the pace quickened. Bell at 2:47.08, 3 laps at 3:01.11. As they ran down the back stretch, Jinson Johnson moved into the lead group as four athletes began to separate. Johnson stayed to the outside of Lewandowski, running extra distance for the entire final turn. When they hit the final straightaway, Manangoi barely had half a meter on Lewandowski on his shoulder, with Ingebrigtsen but an arm's length behind him. As more of an 800-metre specialist, advantage might be expected to be with Lewandowski, but halfway down the straightaway, world champion Manangoi began to pull away to a two-metre victory. Manangoi was comfortable enough with his lead, he had time to salute the crowd before crossing the line. The 17 year old Ingebrigtsen faded four more metres back, but he was still able to hold off the late rush from Charles Philibert-Thiboutot and Ryan Gregson to retain bronze.

Rank	Athlete	Nationality	Team	Result	Points	Notes
1	Elijah Manangoi	Kenya	Africa	3:40.00	8	
2	Marcin Lewandowski	Poland	Europe	3:40.42	7	
3	Jakob Ingebrigtsen	Norway	Europe	3:40.80	6	
4	Charles Philibert-Thiboutot	Canada	Americas	3:40.90	5	
5	Ryan Gregson	Australia	Asia-Pacific	3:40.91	4	
6	Jinson Johnson	India	Asia-Pacific	3:41.72	3	
7	Drew Hunter	United States	Americas	3:43.95	2	
8	Ronald Musagala	Uganda	Africa	3:43.95	1	

Team Points

Rank	Team	Individual Points	Team Points	Notes
1	Europe	13	8	
2	Africa	9	6	
3	Asia-Pacific	7	3	
3	Americas	7	3	

==== Men's 3000 metres ====
9 September

Conducted as an elimination race, Paul Chelimo took the early lead, with the pack content to follow for 2 and a half laps. Then Stewart McSweyn chose to take up the point. As they came up to the first elimination lap, it was a wall of runners tied for the lead, with Edward Zakayo left behind, until the last few metres of the home stretch when he sprinted out to lane 4 to join the wall. Suddenly it was Birhanu Balew left a step behind the wall, to his surprise getting the red paddle on the backstretch. The next lap turned almost into a shoving match, with each athlete protecting their position. The end of the lap again turned into a wall of athletes sprinting to avoid elimination, with Getaneh Molla a mere step behind. After easing through the next half lap, the field again positioned for a sprint to the line, with Zakayo and Marc Scott left behind when Henrik Ingebrigtsen accelerated away. Realizing they were behind both turned into an all out sprint, dipping at the line with Scott the odd man out. After that action Zakayo was spent and jogged the next lap, far behind the remaining competitive four. Chelimo held the advantage at the bell, while Henrik Ingebrigtsen was last in the pack. As Chelimo and Mohammed Ahmed started to pull away, Ingebrigtsen went in chase, as he went around, McSweyn had noting to offer. Ahmed moved forward to challenge Chelimo, clipping his teammate's heels, but Chelimo was having none of the challenge, pulling away the last 200 to an easy victory, the U.S. Army runner saluting as he crossed the finish line. As a Joker race, again Africa squandered their opportunity.

Rank	Athlete	Nationality	Team	Result	Points	Notes
1	Paul Chelimo	United States	Americas	7:57.13	8	
2	Mohammed Ahmed	Canada	Americas	7:57.99	7	
3	Henrik Ingebrigtsen	Norway	Europe	7:58.85	6	
4	Stewart McSweyn	Australia	Asia-Pacific	8:02.01	5	
5	Edward Zakayo	Kenya	Africa	DNF	4	
6	Marc Scott	Great Britain	Europe	DNF	3	
7	Getaneh Molla	Ethiopia	Africa	DNF	2	
8	Birhanu Balew	Bahrain	Asia-Pacific	DNF	1	

Team Points

Rank	Team	Individual Points	Team Points	Notes
1	Americas	15	8	
2	Europe	9	6	
3	Asia-Pacific	6	3	
3	Africa*	6	3	Joker lost

==== Men's 110 metres hurdles ====
9 September

In the center of the track, Taioh Kanai and Antonio Alkana got off to good starts, while world leader Sergey Shubenkov seemed to be left in the blocks, Alkana had a clear advantage over the first hurdle. By the third hurdle, Ronald Levy had caught Alkana, barely ahead of a fast moving Shubenkov. It took two more hurdles for Shubenkov to catch Levy, with Pascal Martinot-Lagarde pulling even with Alkana. In this fast moving race of inches, Shubenkov was just snapping over the hurdles faster than Levy assuming the lead. Alkana rattled the seventh hurdle, just enough to give Martinot-Lagarde the advantage to carry across the line for bronze. More important for Europe, this was their Joker race, which they won handily with the 1-3 finish.

Rank	Lane	Athlete	Nationality	Team	Result	Points	Notes
1	2	Sergey Shubenkov	Authorised Neutral Athletes	Europe	13.03	8	
2	3	Ronald Levy	Jamaica	Americas	13.12	7	SB
3	6	Pascal Martinot-Lagarde	France	Europe	13.31	6	
4	4	Antonio Alkana	South Africa	Africa	13.36	5	
5	7	Devon Allen	United States	Americas	13.57	4	
6	5	Taioh Kanai	Japan	Asia-Pacific	13.72	3	
7	1	Ahmed Al-Muwallad	Saudi Arabia	Asia-Pacific	13.83	2	
8	8	Oyeniyi Abejoye	Nigeria	Africa	13.84	1	PB

Team Points

Rank	Team	Individual Points	Team Points	Notes
1	Europe*	14	16	Joker
2	Americas	11	6	
3	Africa	6	4	
4	Asia-Pacific	5	2	

==== Men's 400 metres hurdles ====
8 September

Known for his fast starts, Karsten Warholm was out fast. Less noticed, in lane 1, Annsert Whyte was flying, clearing hurdles ahead of Warholm. Down the back stretch, #2 in history and #1 in 2018, Abderrahman Samba was gaining on Warholm. Into the final turn, Samba began to edge ahead of Warholm, a step behind Whyte, with Yasmani Copello coming into contention with Warholm. Between the eighth and ninth hurdles, Samba finally passed Whyte. Samba pulled away to an easy win. Warholm labored the final two hurdles but maintained his advantage over Copello. Europe played a Joker and tied for the win to gain the points.

Rank	Lane	Athlete	Nationality	Team	Result	Points	Notes
1	3	Abderrahman Samba	Qatar	Asia-Pacific	47.37	8	CR
2	1	Annsert Whyte	Jamaica	Americas	48.46	7	SB
3	4	Karsten Warholm	Norway	Europe	48.56	6	
4	8	Yasmani Copello	Turkey	Europe	48.65	5	
5	6	Abdelmalik Lahoulou	Algeria	Africa	49.12	4	
6	7	Takatoshi Abe	Japan	Asia-Pacific	49.80	3	
7	2	Cornel Fredericks	South Africa	Africa	50.54	2	
8	5	Kyron McMaster	British Virgin Islands	Americas	52.62	1	

Team Points

Rank	Team	Individual Points	Team Points	Notes
1	Europe*	11	14	Joker
2	Asia-Pacific	11	7	
3	Americas	8	4	
4	Africa	6	2	

==== Men's 3000 metres steeplechase ====
8 September

This race was conducted in the "devil take the hindmost" fashion, though communication of the details did not make its way to the athletes. Evan Jager did not start, reducing the need for the first elimination, still the athletes sprinted with four laps to go. With just over 3 laps to go, as Soufiane El Bakkali was looking around he stepped on the concrete curb, twisting his ankle. He limped across the lap line in fourth place, then fell to the infield, John Kibet Koech was eliminated as the last place runner. With El Bakkali injured, the second lap elimination was no longer necessary, but after the second sprint of the race, Kosei Yamaguchi was spent, jogging two more laps to get the team points before being eliminated. Over the next two laps, the European athletes fell off the pace, while Matthew Hughes led until the penultimate water jump. From there, reigning World and Olympic champion Conseslus Kipruto separated from Hughes. With a comfortable 30 metre lead, Kipruto spent the last lap playing to the crowd, gesturing for them to cheer and holding his hands to his ears to hear them. This was Africa's Joker race, but without El Bakkali, they squandered the opportunity for double points.

Rank	Athlete	Nationality	Team	Result	Points	Notes
1	Conseslus Kipruto	Kenya	Africa	8:22.55	8	
2	Matthew Hughes	Canada	Americas	8:29.70	7	
3	Yohanes Chiappinelli	Italy	Europe	8:32.89	6	
4	Fernando Carro	Spain	Europe	8:33.76	5	
5	Kosei Yamaguchi	Japan	Asia-Pacific	DNF	4	
6	John Kibet Koech	Bahrain	Asia-Pacific	DNF	3	
	Soufiane El Bakkali	Morocco	Africa	DNF	0	
	Evan Jager	United States	Americas	DNS	0	

Team Points

Rank	Team	Individual Points	Team Points	Notes
1	Europe	11	8	
2	Africa*	8	6	Joker lost
3	Asia-Pacific	7	3	
3	Americas	7	3	

==== Men's 4 × 100 metres relay ====
8 September

First-leg runner for Africa, Henricho Bruintjies, pulled a muscle and fell to the ground shortly before the exchange zone resulting in 0 points for his team. Inside of him, Mike Rodgers put the Americas into the lead, handing off to the new American star Noah Lyles. With Africa, represented by an all South African team, out, the closest chasers were the Turkish team representing Europe, led by Jamaican ex-pats, Emre Zafer Barnes and Jak Ali Harvey. Lyles passing to Yohan Blake, Americas continued to expand their lead, handing off to Jamaica's new find for 2018, Tyquendo Tracey with a 7-metre lead. Turkey's star, Ramil Guliyev couldn't make any headway, taking half the straightaway just to pass Blake who jogged after Tracey after the handoff.

Rank	Lane	Team	Athletes	Time	Points	Notes
1	5	Americas	Mike Rodgers (USA); Noah Lyles (USA); Yohan Blake (JAM); Tyquendo Tracey (JAM)	38.05	8	
2	4	Europe	Emre Zafer Barnes (TUR); Jak Ali Harvey (TUR); Yiğitcan Hekimoğlu (TUR); Ramil Guliyev (TUR)	38.96	6	
3	3	Asia-Pacific	Trae Williams (AUS); Joseph Millar (NZL); Jin Su Jung (AUS); Jake Doran (AUS)	39.55	4	
	6	Africa	Henricho Bruintjies (RSA); Simon Magakwe (RSA); Emile Erasmus (RSA); Akani Simbine (RSA)	DNF	0	

Team Points

Rank	Team	Individual Points	Team Points	Notes
1	Americas	8	8	
2	Europe	6	6	
3	Asia-Pacific	4	4	
4	Africa	0	0	

=== Field ===
Events
High jump	Pole vault	Long jump	Triple jump	Shot put	Discus throw	Hammer throw	Javelin throw

==== Men's high jump ====
8 September

Because vertical jumps are already elimination style events, there was nothing unique about the scoring of these events. Donald Thomas kept a perfect round going to 2.27, to take the lead. Maksim Nedasekau had one miss at 2.24 but cleared 2.27 to move into second place, with Brandon Starc making the height on his second attempt to pull up into third. Already with 4 misses in the competition, Ilya Ivanyuk skipped 2.27 in order to try to make a heroic jump at 2.30 to snatch a higher place. Through two rounds of attempts at 2.30, nobody was able to make a clearance. On his final attempt, Thomas made it to retain the lead. After Nedasekau missed, Starc moved into second place by also clearing 2.30. Ivanyuk's bid failed, so Thomas and Starc moved on to try 2.33. After missing twice, already with the lead, Thomas preserved one more jump as protection. When Starc missed, the protection wasn't necessary, but he took a shot at it anyhow and missed. Still Thomas won on the tiebreaker.

Rank	Athlete	Nationality	Team	2.10	2.15	2.20	2.24	2.27	2.30	2.32	2.34	Result	Points	Notes
1	Donald Thomas	Bahamas	Americas	o	o	o	o	o	xxo	xx–	x	2.30	8	
2	Brandon Starc	Australia	Asia-Pacific	–	o	o	o	xo	xxo	xxx		2.30	7	
3	Maksim Nedasekau	Belarus	Europe	–	o	o	xo	o	xxx			2.27	6	
4	Majd Eddin Ghazal	Syria	Asia-Pacific	–	xo	o	o	xxx				2.24	5	
5	Ilya Ivanyuk	Authorised Neutral Athletes	Europe	o	xo	xo	xxo	–	xxx			2.24	4	
6	Bryan McBride	United States	Americas	–	o	o	xxx					2.20	3	
7	Chris Moleya	South Africa	Africa	xo	o	xxx						2.15	2	
8	Mathew Sawe	Kenya	Africa	–	xxo	xxx						2.15	1	

Team Points

Rank	Team	Individual Points	Team Points	Notes
1	Asia-Pacific*	12	16	Joker
2	Americas	11	6	
3	Europe	10	4	
4	Africa	3	2	

==== Men's pole vault ====
9 September

Asia-Pacific only had one competitor, he and the two African entrants were eliminated by 5.30. Of the remaining competitors, all 6 metre jumpers, only Shawnacy Barber even bothered to make an attempt at 5.30, which he cleared on his first. Barber and Timur Morgunov took two attempts while Sam Kendricks made his opener. World record holder Renaud Lavillenie waited until 5.65 to start, clearing it on his first attempt just after Barber had done the same. Kendricks matched Lavillenie, both still clean. Morgunov took two attempts to assume 4th place behind Barber and that was as high as either would go. Kendricks took two attempts to get over 5.75, Lavillenie didn't even bother taking an attempt. When Lavillenie and Kendricks both made 5.80, it was advantage Lavillenie. He lost the advantage by missing his first attempt at 5.85. Kendricks then won the competition by clearing 5.85 moments later. Further strategic maneuvering ensued but neither could clear another bar.

Rank	Athlete	Nationality	Team	4.70	4.90	5.10	5.30	5.50	5.65	5.75	5.80	5.85	5.90	6.01	Result	Points	Notes
1	Sam Kendricks	United States	Americas	–	–	–	–	o	o	xo	o	o	x–	xx	5.85	8	
2	Renaud Lavillenie	France	Europe	–	–	–	–	–	o	–	o	x–	xx		5.80	7	
3	Shawnacy Barber	Canada	Americas	–	–	–	o	xo	o	xx–	x				5.65	6	
4	Timur Morgunov	Authorised Neutral Athletes	Europe	–	–	–	–	xo	xo	–	xxx				5.65	5	
5	Stephen Clough	Australia	Asia-Pacific	–	xo	xxo	xxx								5.10	4	
6	Valko van Wyk	South Africa	Africa	o	xxo	xxo	xxx								5.10	3	
7	Mohamed Amin Romdhana	Tunisia	Africa	o	o	xxx									4.90	2	

Team Points

Rank	Team	Individual Points	Team Points	Notes
1	Americas	14	8	
2	Europe	12	6	
3	Africa	5	4	
4	Asia-Pacific	4	2	

==== Men's long jump ====
8 September

The preliminaries were a close competition. Ruswahl Samaai was the only athlete to exceed 8 metres, but four others jumped 7.95 or better. With only four going to the semi-final, Wang Jianan was the odd man out. Samaai won the semi-final with an 8.09, while Miltiadis Tentoglou did exactly 8 metres to go to the final With his fourth jump beyond 8 metres out of five attempts, Samaai won the final with an 8.10.

Rank	Athlete	Nationality	Team	#1	#2	#3	#semifinal	#final	Best	Points	Notes
1	Ruswahl Samaai	South Africa	Africa	8.05	8.16	x	8.09	8.10	8.16	8	
2	Miltiadis Tentoglou	Greece	Europe	x	x	7.95	8.00	7.92	8.00	7	
3	Jeff Henderson	United States	Americas	7.98	7.89	x	7.90		7.98	6	
4	Henry Frayne	Australia	Asia-Pacific	x	7.96	x	7.89		7.96	5	
5	Wang Jianan	China	Asia-Pacific	7.71	7.84	7.95			7.95	4	
6	Emiliano Lasa	Uruguay	Americas	7.59	7.73	x			7.73	3	
7	Serhiy Nykyforov	Ukraine	Europe	7.58	7.71	7.46			7.71	2	
8	Yahya Berrabah	Morocco	Africa	7.63	x	x			7.63	1	

Team Points

Rank	Team	Individual Points	Team Points	Notes
1	Europe	9	5	
1	Americas	9	5	
1	Asia-Pacific	9	5	
1	Africa	9	5	

==== Men's triple jump ====
9 September

Americas chose this as their Joker. Easy to anticipate, the best active jumper, #2 in history Christian Taylor jumped 17.59 on his first attempt. He was backed up by Cristian Nápoles jumping 17.07, to win the non-finalists. Only Hugues Fabrice Zango was able to exceed 17 metres, with his Burkina Faso National record 17.02 on his last preliminary attempt (though he had a superior pending record from a month earlier). In the semi-final round, it only took 16.44 for Zango to beat Arpinder Singh and Nelson Évora to get into the final. Taylor jumped almost a metre further. And Taylor won the final by 85 cm.

Rank	Athlete	Nationality	Team	#1	#2	#3	#semifinal	#final	Best	Points	Notes
1	Christian Taylor	United States	Americas	17.59	17.04	–	17.41	17.31	17.59	8	
2	Hugues Fabrice Zango	Burkina Faso	Africa	16.92	16.77	17.02	16.44	16.46	17.02	7	NR
3	Arpinder Singh	India	Asia-Pacific	16.59	16.45	16.06	16.33		16.59	6	
4	Nelson Évora	Portugal	Europe	16.58	x	–	16.28		16.58	5	
5	Cristian Nápoles	Cuba	Americas	16.56	17.07	x			17.07	4	
6	Ruslan Kurbanov	Uzbekistan	Asia-Pacific	16.10	16.34	16.33			16.34	3	
7	Godfrey Khotso Mokoena	South Africa	Africa	16.02	16.25	14.71			16.25	2	
8	Pablo Torrijos	Spain	Europe	15.27	15.42	x			15.42	1	

Team Points

Rank	Team	Individual Points	Team Points	Notes
1	Americas*	12	16	Joker
2	Asia-Pacific	9	5	
2	Africa	9	5	
4	Europe	6	2	

==== Men's shot put ====
8 September

With Olympic Champion Ryan Crouser on the team, Americas expected to do well here. Unexpectedly, Crouser threw more than a metre behind his personal best in the preliminaries while Darlan Romani threw just 6 cm off his personal best from earlier this season when he finished almost 2 feet behind Crouser at essentially Crouser's home meet, the Prefontaine Classic. Here, Romani became the semi-finalist while Crouser had to watch. Europe's semi finalist was even closer, European Champion Michał Haratyk 14 cm better than Tomáš Staněk. In the semi, world Indoor and Outdoor Champion Tomas Walsh was finally warmed up, getting to 21 metres exactly, enough to beat Haratyk while Chukwuebuka Enekwechi fouled. Romani's 21.07 won the round. In the final, Romani offered up a 21.68, Walsh threw his best of the day, but 21.43 wasn't good enough.

Rank	Athlete	Nationality	Team	#1	#2	#3	#semifinal	#final	Best	Points	Notes
1	Darlan Romani	Brazil	Americas	21.24	21.89	21.29	21.07	21.68	21.89	8	
2	Tomas Walsh	New Zealand	Asia-Pacific	20.82	x	20.02	21.00	21.43	21.43	7	
3	Michał Haratyk	Poland	Europe	x	20.94	21.36	20.77		21.36	6	
4	Chukwuebuka Enekwechi	Nigeria	Africa	19.91	20.82	20.72	x		20.82	5	
5	Ryan Crouser	United States	Americas	19.76	21.63	21.54			21.63	4	
6	Tomáš Staněk	Czech Republic	Europe	20.33	21.22	x			21.22	3	
7	Mohamed Magdi Hamza	Egypt	Africa	18.76	19.00	19.45			19.45	2	SB
8	Damien Birkinhead	Australia	Asia-Pacific	18.52	x	x			18.52	1	

Team Points

Rank	Team	Individual Points	Team Points	Notes
1	Americas	12	8	
2	Europe	9	6	
3	Asia-Pacific	8	4	
4	Africa	7	2	

==== Men's discus throw ====
8 September New Zealand sprinter Joseph Millar competed in order to gain points for his team, throwing a personal best 27.15m in the unfamiliar event against a world class field. Andrius Gudžius held the lead from the preliminary round with a 66.95. Starting anew in the semi-final round, only Fedrick Dacres and Matthew Denny could land a fair throw, so Gudžius' throw only served as a tiebreaker to give him the bronze medal. In the final, Dacres threw the best of the day, 67.97 while Denny had his worst throw of the day, still good enough for the silver.

Rank	Athlete	Nationality	Team	#1	#2	#3	#semifinal	#final	Best	Points	Notes
1	Fedrick Dacres	Jamaica	Americas	58.38	x	66.64	63.86	67.97	67.97	8	
2	Matthew Denny	Australia	Asia-Pacific	63.99	63.15	63.42	61.84	54.53	63.99	7	
3	Andrius Gudžius	Lithuania	Europe	x	66.95	x	x		66.95	6	
4	Victor Hogan	South Africa	Africa	x	60.05	63.49	x		63.49	5	
5	Daniel Ståhl	Sweden	Europe	64.84	x	x			64.84	4	
6	Reginald Jagers	United States	Americas	62.12	63.49	x			63.49	3	
7	Elbachir Mbarki	Morocco	Africa	x	54.03	x			54.03	2	
8	Joseph Millar	New Zealand	Asia-Pacific	20.66	24.93	27.15			27.15	1	PB

Team Points

Rank	Team	Individual Points	Team Points	Notes
1	Americas*	11	16	Joker
2	Europe	10	6	
3	Asia-Pacific	8	4	
4	Africa	7	2	

==== Men's hammer throw ====
9 September

Olympic champion Dilshod Nazarov's first effort was better than anyone but Diego del Real's best all day. From there Nazarov improved with every throw, winning all three rounds and the championship. After throwing 75.86 in the third round, del Real could only make 73.04 in the semi. With a 74.19, Mostafa Al-Gamel advanced to the final by throwing just 3 cm further than Bence Halász. There, his best of the day 74.22 was no match for Nazarov's best, 77.343.

Rank	Athlete	Nationality	Team	#1	#2	#3	#semifinal	#final	Best	Points	Notes
1	Dilshod Nazarov	Tajikistan	Asia-Pacific	75.05	76.09	76.54	76.87	77.34	77.34	8	
2	Mostafa Al-Gamel	Egypt	Africa	73.28	71.42	x	74.19	74.22	74.22	7	
3	Bence Halász	Hungary	Europe	x	72.62	74.80	74.16		74.80	6	
4	Diego del Real	Mexico	Americas	72.54	75.86	74.09	73.04		75.86	5	SB
5	Ashraf Amgad Elseify	Qatar	Asia-Pacific	74.08	73.87	72.55			74.08	4	
6	Wojciech Nowicki	Poland	Europe	x	x	71.74			71.74	3	
7	Tshepang Makhethe	South Africa	Africa	66.14	66.29	63.74			66.29	2	
	Sean Donnelly	United States	Americas	x	x	x			NM	0	

Team Points

Rank	Team	Individual Points	Team Points	Notes
1	Asia-Pacific	12	8	
2	Europe	9	5	
2	Africa	9	5	
4	Americas	5	2	

==== Men's javelin throw ====
9 September

The European position in the finals was competitive, well beyond the other teams. After first round fouls, Thomas Röhler threw 84.30 to lead after the second round. Jakub Vadlejch upped the ante throwing 84.76 to move ahead in the third, but Röhler confirmed his position with an 86.39. With a near 86 metre close sector foul on his third throw, Neeraj Chopra missed what would certainly have qualified him into the semi-final round. Instead, Cheng Chao-tsun took that position with an 82.60. Cheng then won the semi-final round with his best of the day 83.28, while Röhler only managed an 80.61, which was well within the range of his other semi-finalist competitors. But it was enough to get into the final, where Röhler threw his best of the day 87.07 to take the championship.

Rank	Athlete	Nationality	Team	#1	#2	#3	#semifinal	#final	Best	Points	Notes
1	Thomas Röhler	Germany	Europe	x	84.30	86.39	80.61	87.07	87.07	8	
2	Cheng Chao-tsun	Chinese Taipei	Asia-Pacific	76.25	76.99	82.06	83.28	81.81	83.28	7	
3	Anderson Peters	Grenada	Americas	74.49	80.86	77.97	78.42		80.86	6	
4	Julius Yego	Kenya	Africa	74.87	74.64	77.71	78.41		78.41	5	
5	Jakub Vadlejch	Czech Republic	Europe	x	79.67	84.76			84.76	4	
6	Neeraj Chopra	India	Asia-Pacific	80.24	79.76	x			80.24	3	
7	Phil-Mar van Rensburg	South Africa	Africa	74.68	76.23	76.23			76.23	2	
8	Arley Ibargüen	Colombia	Americas	67.63	x	71.08			71.08	1	

Team Points

Rank	Team	Individual Points	Team Points	Notes
1	Europe	12	8	
2	Asia-Pacific	10	6	
3	Americas	7	3	
3	Africa	7	3	

== Women ==
=== Track ===
Events
100 m	200 m	400 m	800 m	1500 m	3000 m	100 m h	400 m h	3000 m st	4 × 100 m relay

==== Women's 100 metres ====
8 September

The 100 featured the two co-fastest women of the year, both Marie-Josée Ta Lou and Dina Asher-Smith had run 10.85 earlier in the season. From the start, the two were out fastest, running neck and neck, with Ta Lou getting the win. Well behind them, Jenna Prandini and Dafne Schippers were in their own neck and neck battle, Prandini winning the bronze.

Rank	Lane	Athlete	Nationality	Team	Result	Points	Notes
1	3	Marie-Josée Ta Lou	Ivory Coast	Africa	11.14	8	
2	5	Dina Asher-Smith	Great Britain	Europe	11.16	7	
3	6	Jenna Prandini	United States	Americas	11.21	6	
4	1	Dafne Schippers	Netherlands	Europe	11.23	5	
5	2	Ángela Tenorio	Ecuador	Americas	11.44	4	
6	8	Wei Yongli	China	Asia-Pacific	11.51	3	
7	4	Hajar Alkhaldi	Bahrain	Asia-Pacific	11.52	2	
8	7	Janet Amponsah	Ghana	Africa	11.74	1	

Team Points

Rank	Team	Individual Points	Team Points	Notes
1	Europe	12	8	
2	Americas	10	6	
3	Africa	9	4	
4	Asia-Pacific	5	2	

==== Women's 200 metres ====
9 September

Dafne Schippers took the lead from the gun and held a full metre lead coming onto the straightaway. Edidiong Odiong held a marginal lead of the chase group, over Marie-Josée Ta Lou, Shericka Jackson and Shaunae Miller-Uibo. Sporting more conventional hair color just a week after wearing two tone pink and purple while winning the Diamond League Final, Miller-Uibo continued her season long pattern of turning 200 metres into a kicker's race, cruising past Schippers 30 metres out. The next three hit the line virtually at the same time with Ta Lou getting the knod for bronze.

Rank	Lane	Athlete	Nationality	Team	Result	Points	Notes
1	5	Shaunae Miller-Uibo	Bahamas	Americas	22.16	8	
2	4	Dafne Schippers	Netherlands	Europe	22.28	7	
3	6	Marie-Josée Ta Lou	Ivory Coast	Africa	22.61	6	
4	1	Shericka Jackson	Jamaica	Americas	22.62	5	
5	3	Edidiong Odiong	Bahrain	Asia-Pacific	22.62	4	NR
6	8	Ivet Lalova-Collio	Bulgaria	Europe	23.18	3	
7	2	Germaine Abessolo Bivina	Cameroon	Africa	24.08	2	
8	7	Viktoriya Zyabkina	Kazakhstan	Asia-Pacific	24.34	1	

Team Points

Rank	Team	Individual Points	Team Points	Notes
1	Americas*	13	16	Joker
2	Europe	10	6	
3	Africa	8	4	
4	Asia-Pacific	5	2	

==== Women's 400 metres ====
8 September

Going out hard, the long striding Shakima Wimbley opened up a gap from Justyna Święty-Ersetic staggered inside of her. Inside of Święty-Ersetic, the diminutive Salwa Eid Naser was gaining even faster, passing Święty-Ersetic before the end of the first turn. Wimbley caught up to Caster Semenya just before the half way mark, but Naser just cruised by moments later. Seeing Wimbley, Semenya sped up through the turn, the runner known for 800 metres reaching the home stretch about two strides behind Naser. Wimbley was swimming backward, but Semenya was gaining on Naser. On the inside, Stephenie Ann McPherson was picking off Wimbley's wreckage to take bronze. Semenya couldn't catch Naser, but her late run brought her well into the sub-50 club for the first time.

Rank	Lane	Athlete	Nationality	Team	Result	Points	Notes
1	4	Salwa Eid Naser	Bahrain	Asia-Pacific	49.32	8	
2	7	Caster Semenya	South Africa	Africa	49.62	7	NR
3	2	Stephenie Ann McPherson	Jamaica	Americas	50.82	6	
4	1	Lisanne de Witte	Netherlands	Europe	51.51	5	
5	6	Shakima Wimbley	United States	Americas	51.59	4	
6	5	Justyna Święty-Ersetic	Poland	Europe	51.64	3	
7	3	Christine Botlogetswe	Botswana	Africa	52.47	2	
8	8	Anneliese Rubie	Australia	Asia-Pacific	52.50	1	

Team Points

Rank	Team	Individual Points	Team Points	Notes
1	Americas	10	8	
2	Asia-Pacific	9	5	
2	Africa	9	5	
4	Europe	8	2	

==== Women's 800 metres ====
9 September

The gun went off, after being undefeated all season, Caster Semenya went to the front. After the break, Ajeé Wilson and Natoya Goule fell in behind Semenya. First 200 in 26.44, 400 in 55.93. Semenya slowed the third 200, 1:25.83 and for a moment it looked like she was giving Wilson and Goule a chance to catch her, but over the final straightaway, Semenya expanded the lead to finish in 1:54.77. While it was only Semenya's third best race of the season, it was still the eighth fastest 800 metres of all time. Only Pamela Jelimo has been under 1:55 more times in a career or season, all of her four sub 1:55's happening ten years earlier in the 2008 season.

Rank	Athlete	Nationality	Team	Result	Points	Notes
1	Caster Semenya	South Africa	Africa	1:54.77	8	
2	Ajeé Wilson	United States	Americas	1:57.16	7	
3	Natoya Goule	Jamaica	Americas	1:57.36	6	
4	Nataliya Pryshchepa	Ukraine	Europe	1:59.58	5	SB
5	Angie Petty	New Zealand	Asia-Pacific	2:01.26	4	
6	Anna Sabat	Poland	Europe	2:04.43	3	
7	Besu Sado	Ethiopia	Africa	2:08.59	2	SB
8	Brittany McGowan	Australia	Asia-Pacific	2:10.63	1	

Team Points

Rank	Team	Individual Points	Team Points	Notes
1	Americas	13	8	
2	Africa*	10	6	Joker lost
3	Europe	8	4	
4	Asia-Pacific	5	2	

==== Women's 1500 metres ====
8 September

Without the fear of elimination, the women jogged through in now common strategic fashion, Winny Chebet leading through opening laps of 73.05 and 76.31. Going into the bell, Linden Hall decided she wanted the lead, moving to the front with a lap and a half to go, but just before the bell, home town runner Simona Vrzalová made a rush to the lead to the cheer of the crowd. With Chibet in chase, Vrzalová finished the third lap in a significantly faster 63.90. Down the back stretch, Chibet assumed the lead with Rababe Arafi in her wake. Shelby Houlihan followed Arafi, then blew past her in the final turn. At the beginning of the straightway, it looked like it would be a sprint battle to the finish, but Chibet made short work of it, pulling away for the victory.

Rank	Athlete	Nationality	Team	Result	Points	Notes
1	Winny Chebet	Kenya	Africa	4:16.01	8	
2	Shelby Houlihan	United States	Americas	4:16.36	7	
3	Rababe Arafi	Morocco	Africa	4:17.19	6	
4	P. U. Chitra	India	Asia-Pacific	4:18.45	5	
5	Linden Hall	Australia	Asia-Pacific	4:18.82	4	
6	Simona Vrzalová	Czech Republic	Europe	4:19.46	3	
7	Sofia Ennaoui	Poland	Europe	4:22.56	2	
8	Angelín Figueroa	Puerto Rico	Americas	4:33.88	1	

Team Points

Rank	Team	Individual Points	Team Points	Notes
1	Africa	14	8	
2	Asia-Pacific	9	6	
3	Americas	8	4	
4	Europe	5	2	

==== Women's 3000 metres ====
8 September

The field was comfortable to let Konstanze Klosterhalfen hold the lead through most oil the last t and a half laps. With the threat of elimination, Sifan Hassan, Hellen Obiri and Senbere Teferi barely broke a sweat to move forward before the line, while the back of the pack sprinted for the line. Muriel Coneo the first odd woman out but Lauren Paquette was to be the second one eliminated one lap later. Even before the end of that lap, Nozomi Tanaka showed she couldn't keep up with the pack. On the penultimate lap, the pace accelerated to leave Genevieve LaCaze off the back, all in all a relatively painless process of elimination to reach the final four. With 500 metres to go, Hassan began to accelerate, taking the bell with a 5-metre advantage over Teferi with Obiri another 2 back. Hassan's lead broke the will of the chasing Africans, extending it all the way to a 40-metre advantage at the finish for an 8:27.50 win crushing Tirunesh Dibaba's Continental Cup record. While not achieving the anticipated win, Africa managed to tie for the event win and get points for their Joker.

Rank	Athlete	Nationality	Team	Result	Points	Notes
1	Sifan Hassan	Netherlands	Europe	8:27.50	8	CR, NR
2	Senbere Teferi	Ethiopia	Africa	8:32.49	7	PB
3	Hellen Obiri	Kenya	Africa	8:36.20	6	SB
4	Konstanze Klosterhalfen	Germany	Europe	8:38.04	5	SB
5	Genevieve LaCaze	Australia	Asia-Pacific	DNF	4	
6	Nozomi Tanaka	Japan	Asia-Pacific	DNF	3	
7	Lauren Paquette	United States	Americas	DNF	2	
8	Muriel Coneo	Colombia	Americas	DNF	1	

Team Points

Rank	Team	Individual Points	Team Points	Notes
1	Africa*	13	14	Joker
2	Europe	13	7	
3	Asia-Pacific	7	4	
4	Americas	3	2	

==== Women's 100 metres hurdles ====
8 September

From the gun the Americas team took the lead, both world record holder Kendra Harrison with the left leg lead and 2015 world champion Danielle Williams with the right, out together running virtually mirror images of each other on opposite sides of the track. By the fifth hurdle, Harrison looked to have a microscopic lead, but by the eighth, it was Williams with the microscopic edge. That was all it took, Williams was able to outlearn Harrison for the gold. Running in Harrison's wake, Pamela Dutkiewicz was able to nab bronze, three metres behind the leaders.

Rank	Lane	Athlete	Nationality	Team	Result	Points	Notes
1	7	Danielle Williams	Jamaica	Americas	12.49	8	
2	3	Kendra Harrison	United States	Americas	12.52	7	
3	2	Pamela Dutkiewicz	Germany	Europe	12.82	6	
4	6	Elvira Herman	Belarus	Europe	12.91	5	
5	4	Tobi Amusan	Nigeria	Africa	12.96	4	
6	5	Ayako Kimura	Japan	Asia-Pacific	13.39	3	
7	8	Marthe Koala	Burkina Faso	Africa	13.42	2	SB
8	1	Michelle Jenneke	Australia	Asia-Pacific	13.50	1	

Team Points

Rank	Team	Individual Points	Team Points	Notes
1	Americas	15	8	
2	Europe	11	6	
3	Africa	6	4	
4	Asia-Pacific	4	2	

==== Women's 400 metres hurdles ====
9 September

Aminat Yusuf Jamal went out hard from the start, holding the advantage until about the seventh hurdle, when she was caught by Shamier Little. Running a fast final turn in lane 1, Janieve Russell also caught both Little and Jamal by the eighth hurdle and sped away to victory over a spent Little. Jamal had nothing left for the final two hurdles, her form disintegrating as Hanna Ryzhykova pulled away for the bronze. Americas pulled off a perfect score in this race.

Rank	Lane	Athlete	Nationality	Team	Result	Points	Notes
1	1	Janieve Russell	Jamaica	Americas	53.62	8	
2	5	Shamier Little	United States	Americas	53.86	7	
3	8	Hanna Ryzhykova	Ukraine	Europe	54.47	6	SB
4	4	Meghan Beesley	Great Britain	Europe	55.58	5	
5	3	Aminat Yusuf Jamal	Bahrain	Asia-Pacific	55.65	4	
6	2	Wenda Nel	South Africa	Africa	56.54	3	
7	6	Lamiae Lhabze	Morocco	Africa	56.54	2	
8	7	Eri Utsunomiya	Japan	Asia-Pacific	58.92	1	

Team Points

Rank	Team	Individual Points	Team Points	Notes
1	Americas	15	8	
2	Europe	11	6	
3	Asia-Pacific	5	3	
3	Africa	5	3	

==== Women's 3000 metres steeplechase ====
9 September

Rank	Athlete	Nationality	Team	Result	Points	Notes
1	Beatrice Chepkoech	Kenya	Africa	9:07.92	0	CR
2	Courtney Frerichs	United States	Americas	9:15.22	7	
3	Winfred Mutile Yavi	Bahrain	Asia-Pacific	9:17.86	6	
4	Anna Emilie Møller	Denmark	Europe	9:42.57	5	
5	Aisha Praught-Leer	Jamaica	Americas	DNF	4	
6	Ophélie Claude-Boxberger	France	Europe	DNF	3	
7	Sudha Singh	India	Asia-Pacific	DNF	2	
	Weynshet Ansa	Ethiopia	Africa	DQ	0	125.5

Team Points

Rank	Team	Individual Points	Team Points	Notes
1	Americas	11	8	
2	Europe	8	5	
2	Asia-Pacific	8	5	
4	Africa	0	0	

==== Women's 4 × 100 metres relay ====
8 September

Europe represented by an all British team and Asia-Pacific represented by an all Chinese team chose to go with trained experience. Ángela Tenorio put Americas in the lead before handing off to Shaunae Miller-Uibo. Jenna Prandini continued the advantage while the two experienced teams battled to almost event going in to the anchor leg. Vitória Cristina Rosa took the baton with a 4-metre lead and held it as their fastest woman in the world this year, Dina Asher-Smith separated the British European team from Yuan Qiqi. Africa's already well beaten team added further insult when they were unable to negotiate the handoff to their equal fastest woman of the year, Marie-Josée Ta Lou.

Rank	Lane	Team	Athletes	Time	Points	Notes
1	5	Americas	Ángela Tenorio (ECU); Shaunae Miller-Uibo (BAH); Jenna Prandini (USA); Vitória Cristina Rosa (BRA)	42.11	8	
2	4	Europe	Kristal Awuah (GBR); Imani-Lara Lansiquot (GBR); Bianca Williams (GBR); Dina Asher-Smith (GBR)	42.55	6	
3	3	Asia-Pacific	Kong Lingwei (CHN); Wei Yongli (CHN); Ge Manqi (CHN); Yuan Qiqi (CHN)	42.93	4	
	6	Africa	Janet Amponsah (GHA); Blessing Okagbare (NGR); Tobi Amusan (NGR); Marie-Josée Ta Lou (CIV)	DQ	0	163.3(a)

Team Points

Rank	Team	Individual Points	Team Points	Notes
1	Americas	8	8	
2	Europe	6	6	
3	Asia-Pacific	4	4	
4	Africa	0	0	

=== Field ===
Events
High jump	Pole vault	Long jump	Triple jump	Shot put	Discus throw	Hammer throw	Javelin throw

==== Women's high jump ====
9 September

Rank	Athlete	Nationality	Team	1.62	1.67	1.72	1.77	1.82	1.87	1.91	1.93	1.95	1.97	2.00	2.05	Result	Points	Notes
1	Mariya Lasitskene	Authorised Neutral Athletes	Europe	–	–	–	–	o	o	o	o	o	xxo	o	xxx	2.00	8	
2	Svetlana Radzivil	Uzbekistan	Asia-Pacific	–	–	–	o	o	o	o	xxo	o	xxx			1.95	7	
3	Levern Spencer	Saint Lucia	Americas	–	–	–	–	o	o	xo	xo	xx–	x			1.93	6	
4	Marie-Laurence Jungfleisch	Germany	Europe	–	–	–	o	o	xo	xo	xxx					1.91	5	
5	Nicola McDermott	Australia	Asia-Pacific	–	–	–	–	o	xxo	xxx						1.87	4	
6	Inika McPherson	United States	Americas	–	–	–	–	o	xxx							1.82	3	
7	Erika Seyama	Eswatini	Africa	o	xo	xxo	xo	xxx								1.77	2	SB
8	Hoda Hagras	Egypt	Africa	o	o	o	xxx									1.72	1	SB

Team Points

Rank	Team	Individual Points	Team Points	Notes
1	Europe*	13	16	Joker
2	Asia-Pacific	11	6	
3	Americas	9	4	
4	Africa	3	2	

==== Women's pole vault ====
8 September

Rank	Athlete	Nationality	Team	3.60	3.80	4.00	4.15	4.30	4.45	4.55	4.65	4.70	4.75	4.80	4.85	4.90	Result	Points	Notes
1	Anzhelika Sidorova	Authorised Neutral Athletes	Europe	–	–	–	–	–	o	–	o	o	o	x–	xo	xxx	4.85	8	CR
2	Katerina Stefanidi	Greece	Europe	–	–	–	–	–	–	–	o	–	xxo	o	xo	xxx	4.85	7	CR
3	Sandi Morris	United States	Americas	–	–	–	–	–	o	o	o	xxo	xo	o	xo	xxx	4.85	6	CR
4	Yarisley Silva	Cuba	Americas	–	–	–	–	xo	o	xxo	xxx						4.55	5	
5	Lisa Campbell	Australia	Asia-Pacific	o	o	o	xxx										4.00	4	
6	Dorra Mahfoudhi	Tunisia	Africa	o	o	xo	xxx										4.00	3	
7	Donia El Tabagh	Egypt	Africa	xo	o	xxx											3.80	2	

Team Points

Rank	Team	Individual Points	Team Points	Notes
1	Europe	15	8	
2	Americas	11	6	
3	Africa	5	4	
4	Asia-Pacific	4	2	

==== Women's long jump ====
9 September

Rank	Athlete	Nationality	Team	#1	#2	#3	#semifinal	#final	Best	Points	Notes
1	Caterine Ibargüen	Colombia	Americas	6.68	6.76	x	6.85	6.93	6.93	8	NR
2	Brooke Stratton	Australia	Asia-Pacific	6.34	6.58	6.54w	6.71	6.52	6.71	7	
3	Malaika Mihambo	Germany	Europe	6.65	6.86	6.77	6.58		6.86	6	
4	Ese Brume	Nigeria	Africa	x	6.37	6.61	5.90		6.61	5	
5	Shara Proctor	Great Britain	Europe	6.57	6.63	x			6.63	4	
6	Marthe Koala	Burkina Faso	Africa	6.06	6.21	6.60			6.60	3	
7	Christabel Nettey	Canada	Americas	6.14	6.06	6.31			6.31	2	
8	Xu Xiaoling	China	Asia-Pacific	6.17	x	x			6.17	1	

Team Points

Rank	Team	Individual Points	Team Points	Notes
1	Europe	10	7	
1	Americas	10	7	
3	Asia-Pacific	8	3	
3	Africa	8	3	

==== Women's triple jump ====
8 September

Like the men's division, Americas took the Joker in the women's triple jump the best active jumper, #5 of all time, Caterine Ibargüen. Asia Pacific has #8 of all time Olga Rypakova so it was not a lock. In the preliminary round, Ibargüen barely qualified for the semi-final round, jumping exactly one metre less than her personal best and beating her Americas teammate Tori Franklin by only 4 cm. In the semi-final round, Ibargüen improved with her best of the day, a foot and a half further than the previous three efforts. Rypakova beat Paraskevi Papachristou by 4 cm to make the final, though she didn't actually beat Franklin's best. The final was no contest as Rypakova fouled. Ibargüen landed a 14.54 and Americas redeemed their Joker for double points.

Rank	Athlete	Nationality	Team	#1	#2	#3	#semifinal	#final	Best	Points	Notes
1	Caterine Ibargüen	Colombia	Americas	14.31	14.23	–	14.76	14.54	14.76	8	
2	Olga Rypakova	Kazakhstan	Asia-Pacific	14.11	13.86	14.18	14.26	x	14.26	7	SB
3	Paraskevi Papachristou	Greece	Europe	x	x	14.15	14.22		14.22	6	
4	Zinzi Chabangu	South Africa	Africa	x	12.89	x	r		12.89	5	
5	Tori Franklin	United States	Americas	x	13.89	14.27			14.27	4	
6	Kristin Gierisch	Germany	Europe	13.96	13.87	x			13.96	3	
7	Parinya Chuaimaroeng	Thailand	Asia-Pacific	13.53	13.12	12.65			13.53	2	
8	Odile Ahouanwanou	Benin	Africa	x	x	11.29			11.29	1	

Team Points

Rank	Team	Individual Points	Team Points	Notes
1	Americas*	12	16	Joker
2	Europe	9	5	
3	Asia-Pacific	9	5	
4	Africa	6	2	

==== Women's shot put ====
9 September

Rank	Athlete	Nationality	Team	#1	#2	#3	#semifinal	#final	Best	Points	Notes
1	Gong Lijiao	China	Asia-Pacific	19.17	19.58	19.44	19.63	19.25	19.63	8	
2	Raven Saunders	United States	Americas	x	18.38	19.74	19.27	18.39	19.74	7	SB
3	Christina Schwanitz	Germany	Europe	18.88	19.73	19.21	19.07		19.73	6	
4	Ischke Senekal	South Africa	Africa	16.17	17.10	x	16.54		17.10	5	
5	Paulina Guba	Poland	Europe	18.06	18.57	18.94			18.94	4	
6	Danniel Thomas-Dodd	Jamaica	Americas	x	16.96	x			16.96	3	
7	Noora Salem Jasim	Bahrain	Asia-Pacific	x	15.23	16.01			16.01	2	
8	Jessica Inchude	Guinea-Bissau	Africa	14.51	x	x			14.51	1	

Team Points

Rank	Team	Individual Points	Team Points	Notes
1	Europe	10	6	
1	Asia-Pacific	10	6	
1	Americas	10	6	
4	Africa	6	2	

==== Women's discus throw ====
8 September

Sandra Perković came in as the overwhelming favorite, having won all the major competitions, both Olympics and World Championships since 2012, save one blemish in the 2015 World Championships when Cuba's Denia Caballero suddenly became a world beater for that single season. Here she was against Cuba's other competitor from that competition, Yaime Pérez. Perković's 68.44m first effort easily qualified her to the semi-final, while Pérez hit exactly 65 metres to be the second best. Perković beat Pérez by a metre and a half in the semi while both advanced. In the final, Perković threw well beyond 65 metres, but stepped out of the ring in the process, the throw was a foul. At that point, Pérez could have won the competition by not dropping it on her foot and landing a fair throw in the sector. Instead, she went for broke, landing her best throw of the day, 65.30m to take the win. Asia Pacific thought their duo of the #2 thrower in the world, Dani Stevens and Chen Yang could overcome Perković, but they lost the Joker points when neither of their throwers was able to beat Pérez.

Rank	Athlete	Nationality	Team	#1	#2	#3	#semifinal	#final	Best	Points	Notes
1	Yaime Pérez	Cuba	Americas	62.27	65.00	63.02	64.01	65.30	65.30	8	
2	Sandra Perković	Croatia	Europe	68.44	x	64.92	65.57	x	68.44	7	
3	Chen Yang	China	Asia-Pacific	x	61.54	63.34	61.63		63.34	6	
4	Chioma Onyekwere	Nigeria	Africa	56.28	55.11	56.68	x		56.68	5	PB
5	Dani Stevens	Australia	Asia-Pacific	x	62.74	61.72			62.74	4	
6	Andressa de Morais	Brazil	Americas	x	x	58.44			58.44	3	
7	Nadine Müller	Germany	Europe	x	58.34	58.32			58.34	2	
8	Ischke Senekal	South Africa	Africa	x	50.21	x			50.21	1	

Team Points

Rank	Team	Individual Points	Team Points	Notes
1	Americas	11	8	
2	Asia-Pacific*	10	6	Joker lost
3	Europe	9	4	
4	Africa	6	2	

==== Women's hammer throw ====
8 September

Europe had the overwhelming favorite, Anita Włodarczyk and played their Joker. Anita Włodarczyk had 73 metres dialed in, good enough to beat everyone in the field, except DeAnna Price, who threw 75.13 to win the preliminary round. In the semi-final, Price again brushed just short of 75 metres, to beat Włodarczyk with both advancing to the final. In the final, Price threw her best of the day 75.46 m (247 ft 6 in), a Championship Record, while Włodarczyk threw another 73 metre throw to finish a surprising second. Europe was able to redeem their Joker points by tying for first because their other thrower, Alexandra Tavernier, beat the Americas other thrower Jennifer Dahlgren.

Rank	Athlete	Nationality	Team	#1	#2	#3	#semifinal	#final	Best	Points	Notes
1	DeAnna Price	United States	Americas	72.64	x	75.13	74.97	75.46	75.46	8	CR
2	Anita Włodarczyk	Poland	Europe	69.72	71.95	73.45	73.34	73.20	73.45	7	
3	Luo Na	China	Asia-Pacific	66.02	67.39	66.99	67.00		67.39	6	
4	Temi Ogunrinde	Nigeria	Africa	55.99	59.15	57.25	x		59.15	5	
5	Alexandra Tavernier	France	Europe	69.23	x	70.40			70.40	4	
6	Jennifer Dahlgren	Argentina	Americas	65.49	63.75	68.59			68.59	3	
7	Alexandra Hulley	Australia	Asia-Pacific	62.35	x	x			62.35	2	
8	Soukaina Zakkour	Morocco	Africa	58.09	x	x			58.09	1	

Team Points

Rank	Team	Individual Points	Team Points	Notes
1	Europe*	11	14	Joker
1	Americas	11	7	
3	Asia-Pacific	8	4	
4	Africa	6	2	

==== Women's javelin throw ====
9 September

Asia-Pacific played its Joker here and it almost backfired. Europe's Christin Hussong dominated the first round until Lü Huihui pulled out her best of the day 63.88m. At that point neither were in danger of not advancing to the semi-final. Kara Winger threw her best of the day in the semi-final, but both Lü and Hussong advance comfortably with 61 metre throws, Hussong winning the semi by a mere 7 cm. In the final, Lü threw her worst of the day 57.88m. Hussong answered with her worst of the day, more than 6 and a half metres less than any other throw, Lü winning the competition by less than 3 metres. Counting back to the preliminary round, in the second throw of the competition, Kelsey-Lee Roberts was able to beat the best throw Nikola Ogrodníková could muster, to give Asia-Pacific the victory.

Rank	Athlete	Nationality	Team	#1	#2	#3	#semifinal	#final	Best	Points	Notes
1	Lü Huihui	China	Asia-Pacific	58.97	61.18	63.88	61.69	57.88	63.88	8	
2	Christin Hussong	Germany	Europe	62.71	62.53	62.96	61.76	55.05	62.96	7	
3	Kara Winger	United States	Americas	60.37	57.18	57.68	60.38		60.38	6	
4	Jo-Ane van Dyk	South Africa	Africa	45.68	50.99	52.69	51.09		52.69	5	
5	Laila Domingos	Brazil	Americas	60.07	56.08	57.41			60.07	4	
6	Kelsey-Lee Roberts	Australia	Asia-Pacific	59.32	58.30	58.06			59.32	3	
7	Nikola Ogrodníková	Czech Republic	Europe	x	56.61	55.33			56.61	2	
8	Kelechi Nwanaga	Nigeria	Africa	51.66	50.04	51.97			51.97	1	

Team Points

Rank	Team	Individual Points	Team Points	Notes
1	Asia-Pacific*	11	16	Joker
2	Americas	10	6	
3	Europe	9	4	
4	Africa	6	2	

== Mixed ==
=== Mixed 4 × 400 metres relay ===
9 September

The mixed relay is a mix of strategy and talent. Starting with a one turn stagger, Steven Solomon led off an all Australian team for Asia-Pacific, gaining the advantage over triple jumper Christian Taylor and Matthew Hudson-Smith. Both Taylor and Hudson-Smith had competed earlier in the day, though arguably the Triple Jump might be considered less taxing. Down the home stretch, Hudson-Smith asserted himself, passing Taylor and Solomon, with Taylor almost catching Solomon by the handoff to Luguelín Santos. Santos quickly gained the advantage on Asia-Pacific's Murray Goodwin and set off chasing Kevin Borlée who he had beaten in the 400 final earlier in the day. After running their first woman, Christine Botlogetswe, Africa's Chidi Okezie was well behind. Borlée handed off to Lisanne de Witte in the lead, she barely took two steps and while switching hands, the baton went flying. As she went chasing it, the Americas' Stephenie Ann McPherson assumed the lead over Anneliese Rubie. Well behind, Africa handed off to their 800-metre star Caster Semenya. McPherson opened up a 30-metre lead before handing off to Olympic champion Shaunae Miller-Uibo. Semenya almost caught de Witte before handing off to the only male anchor, Baboloki Thebe. The fastest man in the field, Thebe made short work catching Europe's Justyna Święty-Ersetic and set sail after Ella Connolly who he caught with 200 metres to go, but Africa had no chance to make up the huge advantage of the Americas.

Rank	Lane	Team	Athletes	Time	Points	Notes
1	6	Americas	Christian Taylor (USA); Luguelín Santos (DOM); Stephenie Ann McPherson (JAM); Shaunae Miller-Uibo (BAH)	3:13.01	8	
2	3	Africa	Christine Botlogetswe (BOT); Chidi Okezie (NGR); Caster Semenya (RSA); Baboloki Thebe (BOT)	3:16.19	6	
3	4	Asia-Pacific	Steven Solomon (AUS); Murray Goodwin (AUS); Anneliese Rubie (AUS); Ella Connolly (AUS)	3:18.55	4	
	5	Europe	Matthew Hudson-Smith (GBR); Kevin Borlée (BEL); Lisanne de Witte (NED); Justyna Święty-Ersetic (POL)	DQ	0	170.6(c)

Team Points

Rank	Team	Individual Points	Team Points	Notes
1	Americas	8	8	
2	Africa	6	6	
3	Asia-Pacific	4	4	
4	Europe	0	0	
