= 2016 African Championships in Athletics – Men's 400 metres =

The men's 400 metres event at the 2016 African Championships in Athletics was held on 22, 23 and 24 June in Kings Park Stadium.

== Medalists ==
Gold	Silver	Bronze
Baboloki Thebe; Botswana	Karabo Sibanda; Botswana	Chidi Okezie; Nigeria

== Results ==
=== Heats ===
Qualification: First 4 of each heat (Q) and the next 4 fastest (q) qualified for the semifinals.

Rank	Heat	Name	Nationality	Time	Notes
1	5	Karabo Sibanda	Botswana	45.99	Q
2	2	Baboloki Thebe	Botswana	46.00	Q
3	5	Sadam Koumi	Sudan	46.04	Q
4	1	Isaac Makwala	Botswana	46.14	Q
5	2	Chidi Okezie	Nigeria	46.30	Q
6	3	Pieter Conradie	South Africa	46.45	Q
7	3	Alagie Salim Drammeh	Gambia	46.55	Q
8	1	Alphas Kishoyian	Kenya	46.56	Q
9	5	Stanley Kieti	Kenya	46.64	Q
10	3	Emmanuel Dasor	Ghana	46.71	Q
11	2	Raymond Kibet	Kenya	46.78	Q
12	3	Tubotein Taylor	Nigeria	46.93	Q
13	1	Gilles Antony Afoumba	Congo	47.08	Q
14	2	Leonard Opiny	Uganda	47.15	Q
15	1	Nigel Tom	Zimbabwe	47.45	Q
16	1	Thapelo Phora	South Africa	47.64	q
17	1	Louis Mashaba	Swaziland	47.92	q
18	4	Shaun de Jager	South Africa	48.06	Q
19	3	Orukpe Eraiyokan	Nigeria	48.10	q
20	2	Manqoba Nyoni	Swaziland	48.76	q
21	5	Basilius Karupu	Namibia	48.86	Q
22	5	Connias Mudzingwa	Zimbabwe	48.89	q
23	2	Saviour Kombe	Zambia	49.07	
23	3	Gemchu Alemu	Ethiopia	49.07	
25	4	Ahmat Mahamat Bachir	Chad	49.13	Q
26	1	Pius Adome	Uganda	49.44	
27	4	Abdelazim Mohamed	Sudan	50.42	Q
28	3	Gift Ngewnya	Zimbabwe	50.58	
29	2	Gilberto Leite	São Tomé and Príncipe	51.77	
	4	Onkabetse Nkobolo	Botswana	DQ	
	1	Papy Kibambe-Ngoy	Democratic Republic of the Congo	DNS	
	2	Abdallah Albein Abbo	Chad	DNS	
	4	Samuel Yaro	Ghana	DNS	
	4	Adekunle Fasasi	Nigeria	DNS	
	4	Abduraman Abdo	Ethiopia	DNS	
	5	Creve Machava	Mozambique	DNS	
	5	Stephan Ukele	South Sudan	DNS	

=== Semifinals ===
Qualification: First 2 of each heat (Q) and the next 2 fastest (q) qualified for the final.

Rank	Heat	Name	Nationality	Time	Notes
1	2	Baboloki Thebe	Botswana	45.75	Q
2	2	Chidi Okezie	Nigeria	45.80	Q
2	3	Sadam Koumi	Sudan	45.80	Q
4	3	Isaac Makwala	Botswana	45.96	Q
5	1	Karabo Sibanda	Botswana	46.23	Q
6	1	Alagie Salim Drammeh	Gambia	46.41	Q
7	2	Alphas Kishoyian	Kenya	46.51	q
8	1	Raymond Kibet	Kenya	46.70	q
9	3	Stanley Kieti	Kenya	46.81	
10	3	Orukpe Eraiyokan	Nigeria	46.84	
11	1	Pieter Conradie	South Africa	46.94	
12	1	Tubotein Taylor	Nigeria	47.00	
13	2	Emmanuel Dasor	Ghana	47.12	
14	2	Leonard Opiny	Uganda	47.40	
15	3	Gilles Antony Afoumba	Congo	47.62	
16	2	Thapelo Phora	South Africa	47.73	
17	3	Connias Mudzingwa	Zimbabwe	47.82	
18	1	Nigel Tom	Zimbabwe	47.93	
19	2	Manqoba Nyoni	Swaziland	48.08	
20	1	Louis Mashaba	Swaziland	48.33	
21	2	Basilius Karupu	Namibia	49.29	
22	3	Ahmat Mahamat Bachir	Chad	49.36	
	3	Shaun de Jager	South Africa	DQ	
	1	Abdelazim Mohamed	Sudan	DNS	

=== Final ===
Rank	Lane	Athlete	Nationality	Time	Notes
1st place, gold medalist(s)	4	Baboloki Thebe	Botswana	44.69	
2nd place, silver medalist(s)	5	Karabo Sibanda	Botswana	45.42	
3rd place, bronze medalist(s)	3	Chidi Okezie	Nigeria	45.76	
4	7	Isaac Makwala	Botswana	46.58	
5	8	Alagie Salim Drammeh	Gambia	46.71	
6	2	Raymond Kibet	Kenya	46.80	
7	1	Alphas Kishoyian	Kenya	46.95	
	6	Sadam Koumi	Sudan	DQ	
