= 2018 African Championships in Athletics – Men's 400 metres =

The men's 400 metres event at the 2018 African Championships in Athletics was held on 2 and 3 August in Asaba, Nigeria.

== Medalists ==
Gold	Silver	Bronze
Baboloki Thebe; Botswana	Thapelo Phora; South Africa	Chidi Okezie; Nigeria

== Results ==
=== Heats ===
Qualification: First 4 of each heat (Q) and the next 4 fastest (q) qualified for the semifinals.

Rank	Heat	Name	Nationality	Time	Notes
1	5	Baboloki Thebe	Botswana	45.94	Q
2	5	Thapelo Phora	South Africa	46.02	Q
3	5	Alphas Kishoyian	Kenya	46.24	Q
4	3	Chidi Okezie	Nigeria	46.33	Q
5	1	Leungo Scotch	Botswana	46.45	Q
6	5	Orukpe Erayokan	Nigeria	46.55	Q
7	3	Jared Momanyi	Kenya	46.69	Q
8	2	Onkabetse Nkobolo	Botswana	46.75	Q
9	3	Zakithi Nene	South Africa	46.82	Q
10	2	Mohamed Fares Jlassi	Tunisia	46.94	Q
11	4	Leonard Opiny	Uganda	47.04	Q
12	1	Slimane Moula	Algeria	47.12	Q
13	2	Nsangou Tetndap	Cameroon	47.22	Q
14	4	Momodou Bah	Gambia	47.24	Q
15	1	Ernst Narib	Namibia	47.29	Q
16	2	Thandaza Zwane	Eswatini	47.41	Q
17	4	Abdoraman Abdo	Ethiopia	47.44	Q
18	2	Mahmad Alexander Bock	Namibia	47.53	q
19	4	Daniel Mbewe	Zambia	47.54	Q
19	5	Bienvenu Sawadogo	Burkina Faso	47.54	q
21	3	Andile Lusenga	Eswatini	47.69	Q
22	4	Samson Nathaniel	Nigeria	47.84	q
23	1	Rodwell Ndlovu	Zimbabwe	47.88	Q
24	2	Mosisa Siyoum	Ethiopia	47.92	q
25	5	Leon Tafirenyika	Zimbabwe	48.13	
26	4	Pieter Conradie	South Africa	48.34	
27	3	Djibulou Malick	Senegal	48.41	
28	1	Rija Gardiner	Madagascar	48.58	
29	1	Ibrahima Mbengue	Senegal	48.59	
30	5	Mahamat Bachir	Chad	48.64	
31	2	Edmond Hounthon	Benin	48.83	
32	1	Efrem Mekonnen	Ethiopia	48.98	
32	3	Blessing Nyandoro	Zimbabwe	48.98	
34	4	Moussa Adamou Moustapha	Niger	49.54	
35	4	Stefano Bibi	Seychelles	49.68	
	3	Alhagie Salim Drammeh	Gambia	DNF	
	1	Boniface Mweresa	Kenya	DNS	
	2	Anas Beshr	Egypt	DNS	
	3	Moussa Zaroumeye	Niger	DNS	
	5	Abdelmalik Lahoulou	Algeria	DNS	

=== Semifinals ===
Qualification: First 2 of each semifinal (Q) and the next 2 fastest (q) qualified for the final.

Rank	Heat	Name	Nationality	Time	Notes
1	2	Thapelo Phora	South Africa	45.76	Q
2	3	Chidi Okezie	Nigeria	46.09	Q
3	2	Orukpe Erayokan	Nigeria	46.10	Q
4	3	Alphas Kishoyian	Kenya	46.14	Q
5	1	Baboloki Thebe	Botswana	46.25	Q
6	3	Onkabetse Nkobolo	Botswana	46.35	q
7	2	Momodou Bah	Gambia	46.76	q
8	1	Jared Momanyi	Kenya	46.79	Q
9	1	Nsangou Tetndap	Cameroon	46.84	
10	3	Thandaza Zwane	Eswatini	46.91	
11	1	Zakithi Nene	South Africa	46.94	
12	3	Ernst Narib	Namibia	47.11	
13	1	Leonard Opiny	Uganda	47.14	
14	1	Samson Nathaniel	Nigeria	47.22	
15	2	Leungo Scotch	Botswana	47.32	
16	2	Bienvenu Sawadogo	Burkina Faso	47.34	
17	2	Slimane Moula	Algeria	47.37	
18	2	Abdoraman Abdo	Ethiopia	47.76	
19	1	Daniel Mbewe	Zambia	47.82	
20	3	Rodwell Ndlovu	Zimbabwe	47.94	
21	2	Mahmad Alexander Bock	Namibia	48.02	
22	3	Mosisa Siyoum	Ethiopia	48.48	
	1	Andile Lusenga	Eswatini	DNF	
	3	Mohamed Fares Jlassi	Tunisia	DNF	

=== Final ===
Rank	Lane	Athlete	Nationality	Time	Notes
1st place, gold medalist(s)	5	Baboloki Thebe	Botswana	44.81	
2nd place, silver medalist(s)	3	Thapelo Phora	South Africa	45.14	
3rd place, bronze medalist(s)	4	Chidi Okezie	Nigeria	45.65	
4	8	Alphas Kishoyian	Kenya	46.08	
5	6	Orukpe Erayokan	Nigeria	46.38	
6	2	Onkabetse Nkobolo	Botswana	46.83	
7	7	Jared Momanyi	Kenya	47.54	
8	1	Momodou Bah	Gambia	47.75	
