= 2018 African Championships in Athletics – Men's 4 × 400 metres relay =

The men's 4 × 400 metres relay event at the 2018 African Championships in Athletics was held on 4 and 5 August in Asaba, Nigeria.

== Medalists ==
| Gold | Silver | Bronze |
|---|---|---|
| Kenya; Jared Momanyi; Alphas Kishoyian; Aron Koech; Emmanuel Korir | South Africa; Zakhiti Nene; Cornel Fredericks; Pieter Conradie; Thapelo Phora; Le Roux Hamman* | Nigeria; Orukpe Eraiyokan; Rilwan Alowonle; Isah Salihu; Chidi Okezie |

* Athletes who competed in heats only and received medals.

== Results ==
=== Heats ===
Qualification: First 3 teams of each heat (Q) plus the next 2 fastest (q) qualified for the final.

| Rank | Heat | Nation | Athletes | Time | Notes |
|---|---|---|---|---|---|
| 1 | 1 | South Africa | Thapelo Phora, Pieter Conradie, Le Roux Hamman, Zakhiti Nene | 3:05.36 | Q |
| 2 | 1 | Botswana | Leungo Scotch, Nijel Amos, Maotoanong Leaname, ? | 3:06.54 | Q |
| 3 | 1 | Nigeria | Daniel Atinaya, Sikiru Adwale Adeyemi, Henry Okorie, Isah Salihu | 3:07.02 | Q |
| 4 | 1 | Zambia | ?, Sydney Siame, Titus Kafunda Mukhala, ? | 3:09.11 | q |
| 5 | 1 | Eswatini | ?, Zwane Tantaza, Andile Vincent Lusenga, Sibusiso Matsenjwa | 3:09.11 | q |
| 6 | 1 | Ethiopia | Mosisa Siyoum, Efrem Mekonnen, Gadisa Bayu, ? | 3:11.95 | |
| | 1 | Cameroon | ?, Donald Nyanjua, Adbin Zoedong, Nsangou Tetndap | DQ | R170.20 |
| 1 | 2 | Kenya | ?, ?, Aron Koech, Alphas Kishoyian | 3:05.55 | Q |
| 2 | 2 | Algeria | ?, ?, Slimane Moula, ? | 3:08.15 | Q |
| 3 | 2 | Senegal | Frederic Mendy, ?, ?, Ibrahima Mbengue | 3:09.70 | Q |
| 4 | 2 | Uganda | Pius Adome, Rashid Etiau, ?, Geofrey Rutto | ?:??.?? | |
| 5 | 2 | Namibia | Mahmad Bock, Hardus Maritz, Even Tjiviju, Ernst Narib | 3:11.53 | NR |
| | 1 | Sudan | | DNS | |
| | 1 | Zimbabwe | | DNS | |

Note: Some information was gathered from the video of the races

=== Final ===
| Rank | Nation | Competitors | Time | Notes |
|---|---|---|---|---|
| 1st place, gold medalist(s) | Kenya | Jared Momanyi, Alphas Kishoyian, Aron Koech, Emmanuel Korir | 3:00.92 | CR |
| 2nd place, silver medalist(s) | South Africa | Zakhiti Nene, Cornel Fredericks, Pieter Conradie, Thapelo Phora | 3:03.50 | |
| 3rd place, bronze medalist(s) | Nigeria | Orukpe Eraiyokan, Rilwan Alowonle, Isah Salihu, Chidi Okezie | 3:04.88 | |
| 4 | Zambia | Daniel Mbewe, Sydney Siame, Titus Kafunda Mukhala, Kennedy Luchembe | 3:04.98 | NR |
| 5 | Algeria | ?, Slimane Moula, ?, Abdelmalik Lahoulou | 3:05.27 | |
| 6 | Senegal | Frederic Mendy, Ousmane Sidibé, Malick Djibulou, Ibrahima Mbengue | 3:11.04 | |
| | Botswana | ?, Nijel Amos, Maotoanong Leaname, ? | DNF | |
| | Eswatini | | DNS | |
