= Chidi Okezie =

Nigerian-American sprinter (born 1993)

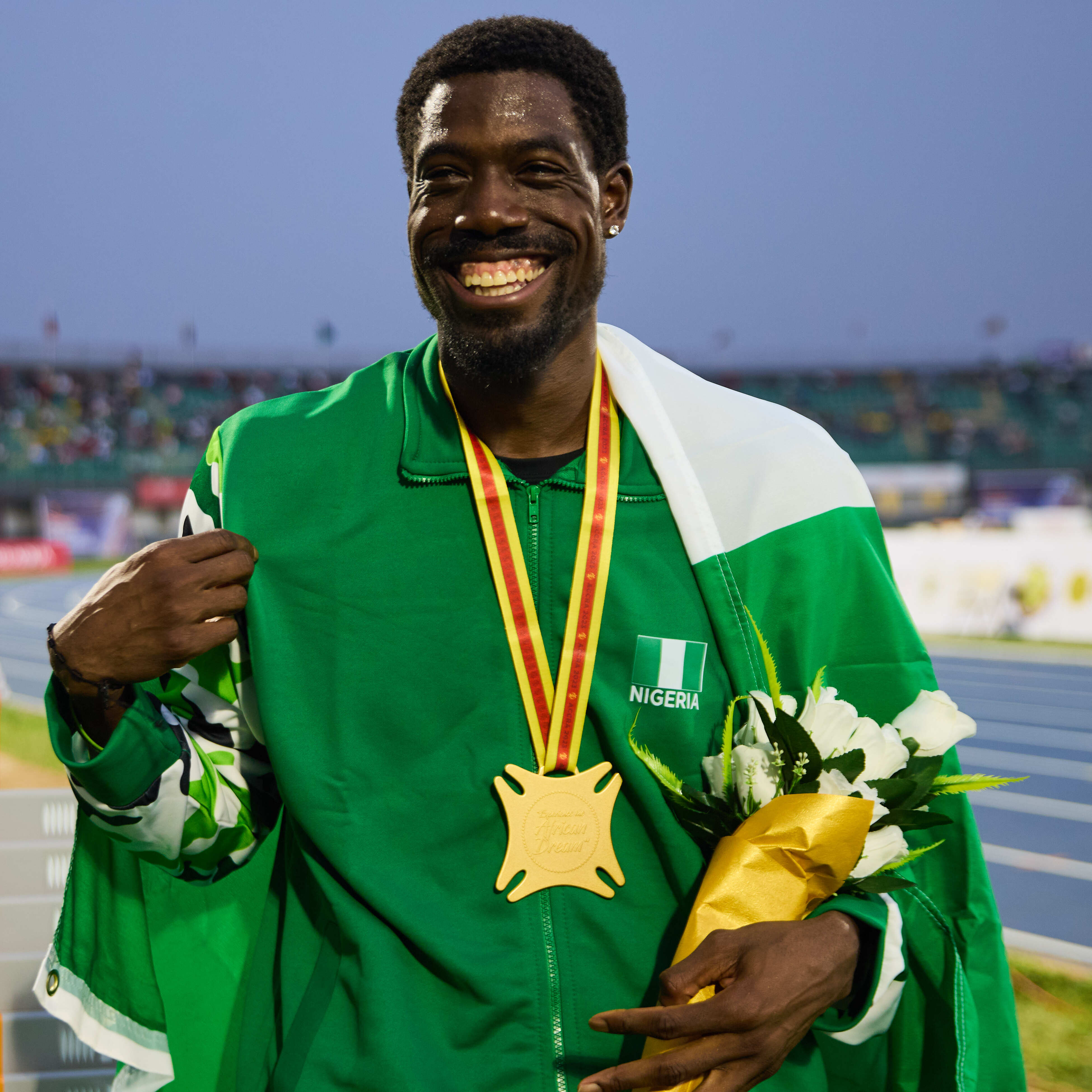
- Okezie at the 2023 African Games

Personal information
- Full name: Chidi Anthony Okezie
- Nationality: American, Nigerian
- Born: 8 August 1993 (age 32) Philadelphia, Pennsylvania, U.S.
- Height: 2.01 m (6 ft 7 in)
- Weight: 90 kg (198 lb)

Sport
- Country: Nigeria
- Sport: Running
- Event: 400 metres
- College team: Hampton Pirates
- Coached by: Aldrin Gray

Achievements and titles
- Personal best: 400 m: 44.97 (Canada 2024)
Medal record
Men's athletics
Representing the United States
World Junior Championships
Gold medal – first place	2012 Barcelona	4×400 m
Representing Nigeria
African Games
Gold medal – first place	2023 Accra	400 m
Bronze medal – third place	2019 Rabat	400 m
Bronze medal – third place	2019 Rabat	4×400 m
Bronze medal – third place	2023 Accra	4×400 m
African Championships
Bronze medal – third place	2016 Durban	400 m
Bronze medal – third place	2018 Asaba	400 m
Bronze medal – third place	2018 Asaba	4×400 m
Bronze medal – third place	2022 Saint Pierre	4×400 m

Chidi Anthony Okezie (born 8 August 1993) is a sprinter. Born in the United States, he competes internationally for Nigeria. He is a two-time African Championships bronze medallist in the 400 metres.

== Personal ==
His father, Moses Okezie is Nigerian and his mother Carol Morris is Jamaican. He has nine siblings. He graduated from Hampton University in 2015 and has a Master's in Sports Administration.

== Career ==
Okezie was part of the American 4 × 400 m relay team that won a gold medal at the 2012 World Junior Championships in Athletics in Barcelona.

He represented Nigeria at the 2018 Commonwealth Games and reached the semifinals of the 400 m. He also ran the anchor leg for the country in the 4 x 400 metres relay heats. The team finished second but were eventually disqualified for a lane infringement.

The 2018 African Championships were a success for Okezie. He won an individual bronze medal in the 400 metres behind Baboloki Thebe and Thapelo Phora. This made him a two-time African Championships bronze medallist as he had won a bronze medal at the 2016 Championships in Durban. He later anchored the Nigerian 4 x 400 m relay team to a bronze medal behind Kenya and South Africa. Okezie was also a member of the African quartet that placed second in the mixed 4 x 400 m relay at the 2018 IAAF Continental Cup.

In 2019, he won the bronze medal in the men's 4 × 400 metres relay at the 2019 African Games held in Rabat, Morocco. He also won the bronze medal in the men's 400 metres.

His personal best in the 400 metres is 45.24 s which he set at the 2018 Culturama Games in Nevis.

== Competition record ==
Year	Competition	Venue	Position	Event	Notes
Representing the United States
2012	World Junior Championships	Barcelona, Spain	1st	4 × 400 m relay	3:03.99
Representing Nigeria
2016	World Indoor Championships	Portland, United States	15th (h)	400 m	47.05
2016	World Indoor Championships	Portland, United States	5th	4 × 400 m relay	3:08.55
2016	African Championships	Durban, South Africa	3rd	400 m	45.76
2018	World Indoor Championships	Birmingham, United Kingdom	17th (sf)	400 m	48.53
2018	Commonwealth Games	Gold Coast, Australia	21st (sf)	400 m	47.33
2018	Commonwealth Games	Gold Coast, Australia	–	4 × 400 m relay	DQ
2018	African Championships	Asaba, Nigeria	3rd	400 m	45.65
2018	African Championships	Asaba, Nigeria	3rd	4 × 400 m relay	3:04.88
2019	African Games	Rabat, Morocco	3rd	400 m	45.61
2019	African Games	Rabat, Morocco	3rd	4 × 400 m relay	3:03.42
2022	African Championships	Port Louis, Mauritius	4th	200 m	21.02
2022	African Championships	Port Louis, Mauritius	3rd	4 × 400 m relay	3:07.05
2024	African Games	Accra, Ghana	1st	400 m	45.06
2024	African Games	Accra, Ghana	3rd	4 × 400 m relay	3:01.84
2024	African Championships	Douala, Cameroon	9th (sf)	400 m	45.96
2024	African Championships	Douala, Cameroon	4th	4 × 400 m relay	3:02.93
2024	Olympic Games	Paris, France	16th (rep)	400 m	45.92
2024	Olympic Games	Paris, France	–	4 × 400 m relay	DQ
2025	World Championships	Tokyo, Japan	39th (h)	400 m	45.66
2026	African Championships	Accra, Ghana	6th	200 m	20.99

== National titles ==
- 200 Metres - 20.62 (Gold), 2025
- 400 Metres - 45.83 (Gold), 2023
- 400 Metres - 46.21 (Gold), 2021

== Personal bests ==
Outdoor

- 400 metres – 44.97 (Edmonton, 2024)
- 200 metres – 20.62 (Abeokuta, 2025)
- 100 metres – 10.57 (Raleigh, 2017)

Indoor

- 200 metres – 21.02 (Boston 2016)
- 400 metres – 46.48 (Boston 2016)
