= Athletics at the 2019 African Games – Men's 400 metres =

The men's 400 metres event at the 2019 African Games was held on 26, 27 and 28 August in Rabat.

== Medalists ==
Gold	Silver	Bronze
Leungo Scotch; Botswana	Thapelo Phora; South Africa	Chidi Okezie; Nigeria

== Results ==
=== Heats ===
Qualification: First 3 in each heat (Q) and the next 6 fastest (q) advanced to the semifinals.

Rank	Heat	Name	Nationality	Time	Notes
1	4	Derrick Mokaleng	South Africa	46.41	Q
2	1	Ditiro Nzamani	Botswana	46.42	Q
3	1	Alphas Kishoyian	Kenya	46.46	Q
4	4	Ifeanyi Emmanuel Ojeli	Nigeria	46.48	Q
5	3	Chidi Okezie	Nigeria	46.65	Q
6	5	Thapelo Phora	South Africa	46.83	Q
7	3	Gilles Anthony Afoumba	Republic of the Congo	46.87	Q
8	1	Erayokan Orukpe	Nigeria	46.94	Q
9	4	Va-Sheku Sheriff	Sierra Leone	46.98	Q
10	4	Leonard Opiny	Uganda	47.05	q
11	5	Kennedy Luchembe	Zambia	47.07	Q
12	1	Gardeo Isaacs	South Africa	47.15	q
13	2	Leungo Scotch	Botswana	47.32	Q
14	3	Cheikh Tidiane Diouf	Senegal	47.39	Q
15	6	Joseph Poghisio Loshangar	Kenya	47.41	Q
16	4	Isaac Makwala	Botswana	47.48	q
17	3	Modou Lamin Bah	Gambia	47.51	q
18	3	Andile Lusenga	Eswatini	47.53	q
19	5	Sadam Koumi	Sudan	47.58	Q
20	3	Gideon Ernst Narib	Namibia	47.68	q
21	6	Said El Guebbaz	Morocco	47.72	Q
22	4	Leon Tafirenyika	Zimbabwe	47.73	
23	5	Alexander Bock	Namibia	47.78	
24	2	Haron Adoli	Uganda	47.87	Q
25	1	Djakaridia Bamba	Mali	47.98	
26	3	Nsangou Tetndap	Cameroon	48.06	
27	2	Frederick Mendy	Senegal	48.23	Q
28	5	Dickson Kapandura	Zimbabwe	48.42	
29	5	Moussa Zaroumey	Niger	48.46	
30	6	Jeremy Cotte	Mauritius	48.46	Q
31	1	Abduraman Abdo	Ethiopia	48.60	
32	2	Golden Gunde	Malawi	48.67	
33	6	Efrem Mekonnen	Ethiopia	48.67	
34	4	Raymond Kibet	Kenya	48.86	
35	4	Ali Khamis Gulam	Tanzania	48.96	
36	6	Stefano Bibi	Seychelles	49.04	
37	1	Rodwell Ndlovu	Zimbabwe	49.05	
38	2	Bachir Ahmat Mahamat	Chad	49.14	
39	2	Mustefa Edeo	Ethiopia	49.21	
40	1	Akoon Akoon	South Sudan	49.77	
41	6	Esmaiel Freitas	São Tomé and Príncipe	50.33	
42	2	Alford Conteh	Sierra Leone	50.35	
43	6	Benjamini Michael Kulwa	Tanzania	50.85	
	5	Younes Chattoui	Morocco	DNS	

=== Semifinals ===
Qualification: First 2 in each semifinal (Q) and the next 2 fastest (q) advanced to the final.

Rank	Heat	Name	Nationality	Time	Notes
1	1	Leungo Scotch	Botswana	45.52	Q
2	3	Thapelo Phora	South Africa	45.67	Q
3	3	Chidi Okezie	Nigeria	46.20	Q
4	1	Ifeanyi Emmanuel Ojeli	Nigeria	46.21	Q
5	3	Gilles Anthony Afoumba	Republic of the Congo	46.22	q
6	2	Ditiro Nzamani	Botswana	46.23	Q
7	1	Gardeo Isaacs	South Africa	46.52	q
8	3	Isaac Makwala	Botswana	46.55	
9	2	Alphas Kishoyian	Kenya	46.61	Q
10	3	Sadam Koumi	Sudan	46.63	
11	1	Va-Sheku Sheriff	Sierra Leone	46.66	
12	2	Derrick Mokaleng	South Africa	46.67	
13	1	Joseph Poghisio Loshangar	Kenya	46.69	
14	1	Andile Lusenga	Eswatini	46.78	
15	3	Cheikh Tidiane Diouf	Senegal	46.85	
16	3	Kennedy Luchembe	Zambia	46.98	
17	3	Modou Lamin Bah	Gambia	47.09	
18	1	Frederick Mendy	Senegal	47.41	
19	2	Leonard Opiny	Uganda	47.56	
20	1	Said El Guebbaz	Morocco	47.78	
21	2	Haron Adoli	Uganda	48.01	
	2	Gideon Ernst Narib	Namibia	DNF	
	2	Jeremy Cotte	Mauritius	DQ	
	2	Erayokan Orukpe	Nigeria	DNS	

=== Final ===
Rank	Lane	Name	Nationality	Time	Notes
1st place, gold medalist(s)	5	Leungo Scotch	Botswana	45.27	
2nd place, silver medalist(s)	3	Thapelo Phora	South Africa	45.59	
3rd place, bronze medalist(s)	4	Chidi Okezie	Nigeria	45.61	
4	2	Gilles Anthony Afoumba	Republic of the Congo	45.96	
5	7	Alphas Kishoyian	Kenya	45.97	
6	8	Ifeanyi Emmanuel Ojeli	Nigeria	46.05	
7	6	Ditiro Nzamani	Botswana	46.15	
8	1	Gardeo Isaacs	South Africa	46.79	
