= Onkabetse Nkobolo =

Botswana sprinter (born 1993)

Personal information
- Born: 23 July 1993 (age 32) Francistown, Botswana
- Education: Universidad Católica San Antonio de Murcia
- Height: 1.83 m (6 ft 0 in)
- Weight: 73 kg (161 lb)

Sport
- Sport: Athletics
- Event: 400 metres
- Coached by: Mogomotsi Otsetswe
Medal record
Men's athletics
Representing Botswana
All-Africa Games
Silver medal – second place	2015 Brazzaville	4x400 m relay
Bronze medal – third place	2015 Brazzaville	400 m
African Championships
Gold medal – first place	2016 Durban	4×400 m
Commonwealth Games
Gold medal – first place	2018 Gold Coast	4x400 m

Onkabetse Nkobolo (born 23 July 1993) is a Botswana sprinter specialising in the 400 metres. He competed at the 2015 World Championships in Beijing narrowly missing the semifinals. In addition, he won two medals at the 2015 African Games. His personal bests in the event are 45.10 seconds outdoors (Brazzaville 2015) and 46.86 seconds indoors (San Sebastián 2015).

== International competitions ==
Year	Competition	Venue	Position	Event	Notes
Representing Botswana
2011	African Junior Championships	Gaborone, Botswana	17th (h)	800 m	1:55.20
2014	African Championships	Marrakesh, Morocco	5th (h)	400 m	46.78^{1}
2015	IAAF World Relays	Nassau, Bahamas	8th	4 × 400 m relay	3:03.73
2015	World Championships	Beijing, China	23rd (h)	400 m	45.17
2015	World Championships	Beijing, China	9th (h)	4 × 400 m relay	2:59.95
2015	African Games	Brazzaville, Republic of the Congo	3rd	400 m	45.50
2015	African Games	Brazzaville, Republic of the Congo	2nd	4 × 400 m relay	3:00.95
2016	African Championships	Durban, South Africa	1st	4 × 400 m relay	3:02.20
2016	Olympic Games	Rio de Janeiro, Brazil	5th	4 × 400 m relay	2:59.06
2017	IAAF World Relays	Nassau, Bahamas	2nd	4 × 400 m relay	3:02.28
2017	World Championships	London, United Kingdom	14th (h)	4 × 400 m relay	3:06.50
2018	Commonwealth Games	Gold Coast, Australia	1st	4 × 400 m relay	3:01.78
2018	African Championships	Asaba, Nigeria	6th	400 m	46.83
2019	African Games	Rabat, Morocco	1st	4 × 400 m relay	38.80
2019	World Championships	Doha, Qatar	–	4 × 400 m relay	DQ

^{1}Did not finish in the semifinals
