= Tyquendo Tracey =

Jamaican sprinter (born 1993)

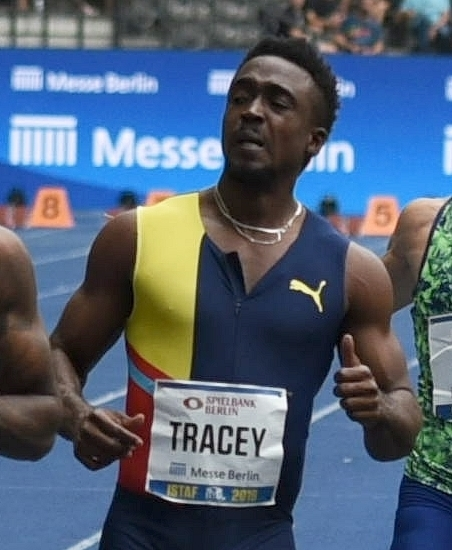
- Tracey at the 2019 ISTAF in Berlin

Personal information
- Born: 10 June 1993 (age 33) Trelawny, Jamaica
- Height: 1.81 m (5 ft 11 in)
- Weight: 81 kg (179 lb)

Sport
- Sport: Track and field
- Events: 100 m, 200 m
- College team: UTech
- Club: MVP; Swept; Dynamic Speed
- Coached by: Stephen Francis; Rana Reider; Okeil Stewart; Michael Frater

Achievements and titles
- Personal bests: 60 m: 6.61 (Spanish Town 2025); 100 m: 9.96 (London 2018); 200 m: 20.34 (Kingston 2021)
Medal record
Men's athletics
Representing Jamaica
Athletics World Cup (Note: Not to be confused with the IAAF World Cup, now known as the Continental Cup.)
Gold medal – first place	2018 London	100 m
Silver medal – second place	2018 London	4×100 m relay
NACAC Championships
Gold medal – first place	2018 Toronto	100 m
NACAC U-23 Championships
Silver medal – second place	2014 Kamloops	100 m
Silver medal – second place	2014 Kamloops	4×100 m relay
World Junior Championships
Silver medal – second place	2012 Barcelona	4×100 m relay
CAC Championships
Silver medal – second place	2026 Santo Domingo	4×100m relay
CAC Junior Championships
Gold medal – first place	2012 San Salvador	4×100 m relay
Silver medal – second place	2012 San Salvador	100 m
Representing the Americas
Continental Cup (Note: Formerly known as the IAAF World Cup, not to be confused with the Athletics World Cup.)
Gold medal – first place	2018 Ostrava	4×100 m relay

Tyquendo Tracey (born June 10, 1993 in Trelawny, Jamaica) is a Jamaican professional athlete competing in the sprints.

== Career ==
He is the 2018 Jamaican champion in the 100 m and the 2018 NACAC champion, setting the championship record of 10.03 s in the process. Just three weeks earlier, he became the 135th man and 20th Jamaican to break the 10-second barrier by running 9.96 s in a qualifying heat at the London Anniversary Games on July 21, 2018. Later that same day, he did it a second time, running 9.98 s in the finals. Tracey later anchored the Americas team to victory in the 4 × 100 m relay at the 2018 Continental Cup.

Tracey represented Jamaica at the 2020 Summer Olympics.

Bobsleding

In 2026, Tracey was part of Jamaica's four-man bobsled team at the 2026 Winter Olympics. At this winter games, Tyquendo is the first sub-10 sprinter to participate in any winter Olympic event. During the lead up to the Olympics, the bobsleigh team won a few medals including gold defeating stellar teams which helped them to qualify for a spot at the games.

== Biography ==
Tracey went to Garvey Maceo High School before enrolling at the Jamaican University of Technology in 2012. He joined the MVP Track Club where former 100 m world record holder Asafa Powell trains, coached by Stephen Francis. However, despite a successful 2018 season he was asked to leave before the year ended. He then trained in the U.S. under the tutelage of coach Rana Reider.

== Statistics ==
Information from World Athletics profile unless otherwise noted.

=== Personal bests ===
Event	Time	Wind (m/s)	Venue	Date
100 m	9.96	+0.2	London, England	July 21, 2018
200 m	20.34	+0.5	Kingston, Jamaica	June 27, 2021
4×100 m relay	37.95	n/a	London, England	August 12, 2017
4×200 m relay	1:23.24	n/a	Philadelphia, Pennsylvania, U.S.	April 30, 2016

=== 100 m seasonal bests ===
Year	Time	Wind (m/s)	Venue	Date
2011	10.73	+0.8	Kingston, Jamaica	March 12
2012	10.33 w	+3.3	Kingston, Jamaica	June 16
2012	10.61	+0.9	San Salvador, El Salvador	June 29
2013	10.35	+0.9	Kingston, Jamaica	June 20
2014	10.21	+0.2	Kamloops, British Columbia, Canada	August 8
2015	10.14	+0.8	Kingston, Jamaica	June 25
2016	10.27	−0.9	Kingston, Jamaica	July 1
2017	10.12	+0.5	Kingston, Jamaica	June 23
2018	9.96	+0.2	London, England	July 21
2019	10.00	+0.4	Kingston, Jamaica	June 21

=== International championship results ===
Year	Competition	Position	Event	Notes
Representing Jamaica
2012	CACAC Junior Championships	2nd	100 m	
2012	CACAC Junior Championships	1st	4×100 m relay	
2012	World Junior Championships	5th (quarter 4)	200 m	
2012	World Junior Championships	2nd	4×100 m relay	38.97 s, junior NR (Note: Shared with Odean Skeen, Jevaughn Minzie, and Jazeel Murphy for Jamaica.)
2014	NACAC U23 Championships	2nd	100 m	
2014	NACAC U23 Championships	2nd	4×100 m relay	
2017	Universiade	4th	100 m	
2017	World Championships	1st (semi 2)	4×100 m relay	Q (Note: Tyquendo Tracey did not run in the final.)
2018	Athletics World Cup	2nd	4×100 m relay	
2018	Athletics World Cup	1st	100 m	
2018	NACAC Championships	1st	100 m	
2018	NACAC Championships	4th	4×100 m relay	
2019	World Relays	3rd (semi 1)	4×100 m relay	q
2019	World Championships	4th (semi 3)	100 m	
2026	CAC Championships	2nd	4×100m relay	38.08
Representing the Americas
2018	Continental Cup	1st	4×100 m relay	

=== National titles ===
- Jamaican Championships
  - 100 m: 2018, 2021
