= Ditiro Nzamani =

Botswana sprinter (born 2000)

Personal information
- Born: 29 January 2000 (age 26)

Sport
- Sport: Athletics
- Event: 400 metres
Medal record
Men's athletics
Representing Botswana
World Relays
Bronze medal – third place	2021 Chorzów	4×400 m relay

Ditiro Nzamani (born 29 January 2000) is a sprinter from Botswana specialising in the 400 metres. He represented his country at the 2019 World Championships without advancing from the first round. Earlier that year he won a gold medal in the 4 × 400 metres relay at the 2019 African Games.

== International competitions ==
Year	Competition	Venue	Position	Event	Notes
Representing Botswana
2019	African Games	Rabat, Morocco	7th	400 m	46.15
2019	African Games	Rabat, Morocco	1st	4 × 400 m relay	3:02.55
2019	World Championships	Doha, Qatar	28th (h)	400 m	46.19
2021	World Relays	Chorzów, Poland	3rd	4 × 400 m relay	3:04.77

== Personal bests ==
Outdoor

- 400 metres – 45.07 (Yaoundé 2019)
