= 2016 African Championships in Athletics – Men's 4 × 400 metres relay =

The men's 4 × 400 metres relay event at the 2016 African Championships in Athletics was held on 26 June in Kings Park Stadium.

== Results ==
Rank	Nation	Competitors	Time	Notes
1st place, gold medalist(s)	Botswana	Karabo Sibanda, Baboloki Thebe, Onkabetse Nkobolo, Leaname Maotoanong	3:02.20	
2nd place, silver medalist(s)	Kenya	Boniface Mucheru, Alphas Kishoyian, Boniface Mweresa, Haron Koech	3:04.25	
3rd place, bronze medalist(s)	South Africa	Jon Seeliger, Shaun de Jager, Ofentse Mogawane, LJ van Zyl	3:04.73	
4	Algeria	Hicham Laaredj, Skander Djamil Athmani, Fethi Benchaa, Soufiane Bouhadda	3:07.32	
5	Swaziland	Mcebo Mkhaliphi, Manqoba Nyoni, Andile Lusenga, Louis Mashaba	3:12.64	NR
6	Sudan	Fathi Adam, Awad Makki, Mohamed Abdelazim Mohamed, Sadam Koumi	3:14.58	
7	Zimbabwe	Gift Ngwenya, Nigel Tom, Nyasha Mutsetse, Connias Mudzingwa	3:14.81	
8	South Sudan	Mangar Chep, Gatkuoth Chol, Santino Kenyi, Stephen Ukele	3:22.50	
