= Athletics at the 2019 African Games – Men's 4 × 400 metres relay =

The men's 4 × 400 metres relay event at the 2019 African Games was held on 30 August in Rabat.

== Results ==
Rank	Nation	Athletes	Time	Notes
1st place, gold medalist(s)	Botswana	Zibane Ngozi, Ditiro Nzamani, Onkabetse Nkobolo, Leungo Scotch	3:02.55	
2nd place, silver medalist(s)	South Africa	Gardeo Isaacs, Ranti Dikgale, Thapelo Phora, Derrick Mokaleng	3:03.18	
3rd place, bronze medalist(s)	Nigeria	Shedrack Akpeki, Samson Oghenewegba Nathaniel, Ifeanyi Emmanuel Ojeli, Chidi Okezie	3:03.42	
4	Kenya	Mike Mokamba, Joseph Poghisio Loshangar, Aron Kipchumba Koech, Alphas Kishoyian	3:05.71	
5	Senegal	Frederick Mendy, Mouhamadou Bamba Niang, Cheikh Tidiane Diouf, Ibrahima Mbengue	3:07.08	
6	Namibia	Thasiso Aochumub, Gideon Ernst Narib, Alexander Bock, Warren Goreseb	3:10.12	
7	Ethiopia	Efrem Mekonnen, Assefa Melkamu, Abduraman Abdo, Mustefa Edeo	3:11.58	
8	Zimbabwe	Leon Tafirenyika, Nyasha Mutsetse, Rodwell Ndlovu, Norman Mukwada	3:12.41	
