= Alphas Kishoyian =

Kenyan sprinter (born 1994)

Personal information
- Nationality: Kenyan
- Born: 12 October 1994 (age 32)
- Education: Shivaji University
- Height: 1.62 m (5 ft 4 in)
- Weight: 56 kg (123 lb)

Sport
- Sport: Running
- Event: 400 metres

Achievements and titles
- Personal best: 400 m: 44.75 (Nairobi 2015)
Medal record
Men's athletics
Representing Kenya
World Relay Championships
Silver medal – second place	2015 Nassau	Distance Medley Relay
African Championships
Gold medal – first place	2018 Asaba	4×400 m
Silver medal – second place	2016 Durban	4×400 m
African Junior Championships
Bronze medal – third place	2011 Gaborone	400 m
Summer Youth Olympics
Bronze medal – third place	2010 Singapore	400 m
World Youth Championships
Silver medal – second place	2011 Lille	400 m
Silver medal – second place	2011 Gaborone	4×400 m
Commonwealth Youth Games
Silver medal – second place	2011 Douglas	400 m

Alphas Leken Kishoyian (born 12 October 1994) is a Kenyan sprinter.

Kishoyian won a silver medal in the 400 metres at the 2011 World Youth Championships in Athletics, losing to Arman Hall. He also won a silver medal in the 400 m at the 2011 Commonwealth Youth Games, losing to Clovis Asong.

== International competitions ==
Year	Competition	Venue	Position	Event	Notes
Representing Kenya
2010	Youth Olympic Games	Singapore	3rd	400 m	47.24
2011	African Junior Championships	Gaborone, Botswana	3rd	400 m	46.71
2011	African Junior Championships	Gaborone, Botswana	2nd	4 × 400 m relay	3:10.17
2011	World Youth Championships	Lille, France	2nd	400 m	46.58
2011	Commonwealth Youth Games	Douglas, Isle of Man	2nd	400 m	48.28
2012	Olympic Games	London, United Kingdom	–	4 × 400 m relay	DQ
2013	World Championships	Moscow, Russia	17th (h)	4 × 400 m relay	3:06.29
2015	World Relays	Nassau, Bahamas	12th (h)	4 × 400 m relay	3:05.92
2015	World Relays	Nassau, Bahamas	2nd	Distance medley relay	9:17.20
2015	World Championships	Beijing, China	40th (h)	400 m	46.02
2016	African Championships	Durban, South Africa	7th	400 m	46.95
2016	African Championships	Durban, South Africa	2nd	4 × 400 m relay	3:04.25
2016	Olympic Games	Rio de Janeiro, Brazil	42nd (h)	400 m	46.74
2017	World Relays	Nassau, Bahamas	1st (B)	4 × 400 m relay	3:06.36
2018	African Championships	Asaba, Nigeria	4th	400 m	46.08
2018	African Championships	Asaba, Nigeria	1st	4 × 400 m relay	3:00.92
2019	World Relays	Yokohama, Japan	4th	4 × 200 m relay	1:22.55
2019	African Games	Rabat, Morocco	5th	400 m	45.97
2019	African Games	Rabat, Morocco	4th	4 × 400 m relay	3:05.71
2019	World Championships	Doha, Qatar	21st (sf)	400 m	45.55
