= 2018 IAAF Continental Cup =

3rd IAAF Continental Cup
- Dates: 8–9 September 2018
- Host city: Ostrava, Czech Republic
- Venue: Městský stadion
- Events: 37

The 2018 IAAF Continental Cup was an international track and field sporting event that was held in Ostrava, Czech Republic, on 8–9 September 2018.

It was the third edition of the IAAF Continental Cup since the name and format was changed from the IAAF World Cup.

== Format ==
The four teams competing in the event were Africa, the Americas, Asia-Pacific and Europe. The two-day competition comprised a programme of 20 track and field events for men and women, giving a total of 40 events. Each team shall enter two athletes in each event, except for relays where one team competed, with a maximum of one athlete from each country per event.

Teams were selected as follows:

- Africa: 2018 African Championships (Asaba, 1–5 August)
- Americas: selection by rankings
- Asia-Pacific: selection by rankings
- Europe: 2018 European Championships (Berlin, 7–12 August)

Many events were conducted in elimination fashion. Field events were given three attempts to qualify to a semi-final round, where the best representative from each continental team was given one more attempt. The top two then had one more attempt for the championship, head to head. The 3000 metre and steeplechase running events were conducted in a "devil take the hindmost" fashion, where the last place runner in the last three laps of the race, was eliminated. Additionally, the ceremonial team captains were allowed to apply a "joker" to one male and female event through the competition. If the team won the individual points from the event, that team's score would be doubled.

Team captains:

- Africa: Nezha Bidouane
- Americas: Mike Powell
- Asia Pacific: Jana Pittman
- Europe: Colin Jackson

Scoring was based on team points earned in an 8-6-4-2 fashion based on the places of individual points. The individual points were distributed 8-7-6-5-4-3-2-1 based on the places of finishing athletes. After those points were tallied, then team points were calculated. Ties divide points based on the total of both places. Example: If team A fished 1st and 5th they would get 8 + 4 = 12 points. Team B finished 2nd and 3rd would get 7 + 6 = 13 and would win that event. So Team B would get 8 team points, Team A, 6 points. If Team B were to have played their Joker, they would get 16 points. Had Team A's athlete finished in 4th, it would be a tie with 13 individual points each and the team points would be (8 + 6 / 2) 7 each, and with the Joker, Team B would get 14.

Athletes were encouraged to be fan friendly. As a result many played to the crowd.

== Schedule ==
Time	Event
September 8
14:30	W Hammer Throw Final
14:35	M High Jump Final
14:40	W 100 Metres Hurdles Final
14:52	M 200 Metres Final
15:00	W Triple Jump Final
15:15	W 100 Metres Final
15:25	W 1500 Metres Final
15:47	W 400 Metres Final
15:52	M Discus Throw Final
15:57	W Pole Vault Final
15:59	M 3000 Metres Steeplechase Final
16:14	M 400 Metres Hurdles Final
16:22	M Long Jump Final
16:35	W 3000 Metres Final
16:52	M Shot Put Final
17:10	W Discus Throw Final
17:12	M 800 Metres Final
17:34	W 4x100 Metres Relay Final
17:56	M 4x100 Metres Relay Final
September 9
14:38	M Hammer Throw Final
14:43	W High Jump Final
15:00	M Triple Jump Final
15:03	M 110 Metres Hurdles Final
15:24	W 800 Metres Final
15:32	M Pole Vault Final
15:48	W 200 Metres Final
15:57	M 400 Metres Final
16:05	M Javelin Throw Final
16:10	W 3000 Metres Steeplechase Final
16:25	W Long Jump Final
16:30	W 400 Metres Hurdles Final
16:48	M 1500 Metres Final
16:57	W Shot Put Final
17:13	W Javelin Throw Final
17:15	M 3000 Metres Final
17:39	M 100 Metres Final
17:59	4x400 Metres Relay Final

== Standings ==
Rank	Team	Points
1st place, gold medalist(s)	Americas	262
2nd place, silver medalist(s)	Europe	233
3rd place, bronze medalist(s)	Asia-Pacific	188
4	Africa	142

== Medal summary ==
=== Men ===
Event	Gold		Silver		Bronze	
100 metres	Noah Lyles (USA); Americas	10.01	Su Bingtian (CHN); Asia-Pacific	10.03	Akani Simbine (RSA); Africa	10.11
200 metres	Alonso Edward (PAN); Americas	20.19	Ramil Guliyev (TUR); Europe	20.28	Álex Quiñónez (ECU); Americas	20.36
400 metres	Abdalelah Haroun (QAT); Asia-Pacific	44.72	Baboloki Thebe (BOT); Africa	45.10	Nathan Strother (USA); Americas	45.28
800 metres	Emmanuel Korir (KEN); Africa	1:46.50	Clayton Murphy (USA); Americas	1:46.77	Nijel Amos (BOT); Africa	1:46.77
1500 metres	Elijah Manangoi (KEN); Africa	3:40.00	Marcin Lewandowski (POL); Europe	3:40.42	Jakob Ingebrigtsen (NOR); Europe	3:40.80
3000 metres	Paul Chelimo (USA); Americas	7:57.13	Mohammed Ahmed (CAN); Americas	7:57.99	Henrik Ingebrigtsen (NOR); Europe	7:58.85
110 m hurdles	Sergey Shubenkov (ANA); Europe	13.03	Ronald Levy (JAM); Americas	13.12; SB	Pascal Martinot-Lagarde (FRA); Europe	13.31
400 m hurdles	Abderrahman Samba (QAT); Asia-Pacific	47.37 =CR	Annsert Whyte (JAM); Americas	48.46; SB	Karsten Warholm (NOR); Europe	48.56
3000 metres steeplechase	Conseslus Kipruto (KEN); Africa	8:22.55	Matthew Hughes (CAN); Americas	8:29.70	Yohanes Chiappinelli (ITA); Europe	8:32.89
4 × 100 m relay	Americas; Mike Rodgers (USA); Noah Lyles (USA); Yohan Blake (JAM); Tyquendo Tracey (JAM)	38.05	Europe; Emre Zafer Barnes (TUR); Jak Ali Harvey (TUR); Yiğitcan Hekimoğlu (TUR); Ramil Guliyev (TUR)	38.96	Asia-Pacific; Trae Williams (AUS); Joseph Millar (NZL); Jin Su Jung (AUS); Jake Doran (AUS)	39.55
High jump	Donald Thomas (BAH); Americas	2.30	Brandon Starc (AUS); Asia-Pacific	2.30	Maksim Nedasekau (BLR); Europe	2.27
Pole vault	Sam Kendricks (USA); Americas	5.85	Renaud Lavillenie (FRA); Europe	5.80	Shawnacy Barber (CAN); Americas	5.65
Long jump	Ruswahl Samaai (RSA); Africa	8.16	Miltiadis Tentoglou (GRE); Europe	8.00	Jeff Henderson (USA); Americas	7.98
Triple jump	Christian Taylor (USA); Americas	17.59	Hugues Fabrice Zango (BUR); Africa	17.02; NR	Arpinder Singh (IND); Asia-Pacific	16.59
Shot put	Darlan Romani (BRA); Americas	21.89	Tomas Walsh (NZL); Asia-Pacific	21.43	Michał Haratyk (POL); Europe	21.36
Discus throw	Fedrick Dacres (JAM); Americas	67.97	Matthew Denny (AUS); Asia-Pacific	63.99	Andrius Gudžius (LTU); Europe	66.95
Hammer throw	Dilshod Nazarov (TJK); Asia-Pacific	77.34	Mostafa Al-Gamel (EGY); Africa	74.22	Bence Halász (HUN); Europe	74.80
Javelin throw	Thomas Röhler (GER); Europe	87.07	Cheng Chao-tsun (TPE); Asia-Pacific	83.28	Anderson Peters (GRN); Americas	80.86

=== Women ===
Event	Gold		Silver		Bronze	
100 metres	Marie-Josée Ta Lou (CIV); Africa	11.14	Dina Asher-Smith (GBR); Europe	11.16	Jenna Prandini (USA); Americas	11.21
200 metres	Shaunae Miller-Uibo (BAH); Americas	22.16	Dafne Schippers (NED); Europe	22.28	Marie-Josée Ta Lou (CIV); Africa	22.61
400 metres	Salwa Eid Naser (BHR); Asia-Pacific	49.32	Caster Semenya (RSA); Africa	49.62; NR	Stephenie Ann McPherson (JAM); Americas	50.82
800 metres	Caster Semenya (RSA); Africa	1:54.77	Ajeé Wilson (USA); Americas	1:57.16	Natoya Goule (JAM); Americas	1:57.36
1500 metres	Winny Chebet (KEN); Africa	4:16.01	Shelby Houlihan (USA); Americas	4:16.36	Rababe Arafi (MAR); Africa	4:17.19
3000 metres	Sifan Hassan (NED); Europe	8:27.50; CR, NR	Senbere Teferi (ETH); Africa	8:32.49; PB	Hellen Obiri (KEN); Africa	8:36.20; SB
100 m hurdles	Danielle Williams (JAM); Americas	12.49	Kendra Harrison (USA); Americas	12.52	Pamela Dutkiewicz (GER); Europe	12.82
400 m hurdles	Janieve Russell (JAM); Americas	53.62	Shamier Little (USA); Americas	53.86	Hanna Ryzhykova (UKR); Europe	54.47; SB
3000 m steeplechase	Beatrice Chepkoech (KEN); Africa	9:07.92; CR	Courtney Frerichs (USA); Americas	9:15.22	Winfred Mutile Yavi (BHR); Asia-Pacific	9:17.86
4 × 100 m relay	Americas; Ángela Tenorio (ECU); Shaunae Miller-Uibo (BAH); Jenna Prandini (USA); Vitória Cristina Rosa (BRA)	42.11	Europe; Kristal Awuah (GBR); Imani-Lara Lansiquot (GBR); Bianca Williams (GBR); Dina Asher-Smith (GBR)	42.55	Asia-Pacific; Kong Lingwei (CHN); Wei Yongli (CHN); Ge Manqi (CHN); Yuan Qiqi (CHN)	42.93
High jump	Mariya Lasitskene (ANA); Europe	2.00	Svetlana Radzivil (UZB); Asia-Pacific	1.95	Levern Spencer (LCA); Americas	1.93
Pole vault	Anzhelika Sidorova (ANA); Europe	4.85; CR	Katerina Stefanidi (GRE); Europe	4.85; CR	Sandi Morris (USA); Americas	4.85; CR
Long jump	Caterine Ibargüen (COL); Americas	6.93; NR	Brooke Stratton (AUS); Asia-Pacific	6.71	Malaika Mihambo (GER); Europe	6.86
Triple jump	Caterine Ibargüen (COL); Americas	14.76	Olga Rypakova (KAZ); Asia-Pacific	14.26; SB	Paraskevi Papachristou (GRE); Europe	14.22
Shot put	Gong Lijiao (CHN); Asia-Pacific	19.63	Raven Saunders (USA); Americas	19.74; SB	Christina Schwanitz (GER); Europe	19.73
Discus throw	Yaime Pérez (CUB); Americas	65.30	Sandra Perković (CRO); Europe	68.44	Chen Yang (CHN); Asia-Pacific	63.34
Hammer throw	DeAnna Price (USA); Americas	75.46; CR	Anita Włodarczyk (POL); Europe	73.45	Luo Na (CHN); Asia-Pacific	67.39
Javelin throw	Lü Huihui (CHN); Asia-Pacific	63.88	Christin Hussong (GER); Europe	62.96	Kara Winger (USA); Americas	60.38

=== Mixed ===
Event	Gold		Silver		Bronze	
4 × 400 m relay	Americas; Christian Taylor (USA); Luguelín Santos (DOM); Stephenie Ann McPherson (JAM); Shaunae Miller-Uibo (BAH)	3:13.01	Africa; Christine Botlogetswe (BOT); Chidi Okezie (NGR); Caster Semenya (RSA); Baboloki Thebe (BOT)	3:16.19	Asia-Pacific; Steven Solomon (AUS); Murray Goodwin (AUS); Anneliese Rubie (AUS); Ella Connolly (AUS)	3:18.55

== Participating nations ==
- Africa
  - Algeria (ALG) (1)
  - Burundi (BDI) (1)
  - Botswana (BOT) (3)
  - Burkina Faso (BUR) (2)
  - Ivory Coast (CIV) (2)
  - Cameroon (CMR) (1)
  - Egypt (EGY) (4)
  - Ethiopia (ETH) (3)
  - Guinea-Bissau (GBS) (1)
  - Ghana (GHA) (1)
  - Kenya (KEN) (9)
  - Morocco (MAR) (6)
  - Nigeria (NGA) (15)
  - South Africa (RSA) (20)
  - Eswatini (SWZ) (1)
  - Tunisia (TUN) (2)
  - Uganda (UGA) (1)
- Americas
  - Argentina (ARG) (1)
  - Bahamas (BAH) (2)
  - Brazil (BRA) (4)
  - British Virgin Islands (IVB) (1)
  - Canada (CAN) (5)
  - Colombia (COL) (2)
  - Cuba (CUB) (3)
  - Dominican Republic (DOM) (1)
  - Ecuador (ECU) (2)
  - Grenada (GRN) (1)
  - Jamaica (JAM) (12)
  - Mexico (MEX) (1)
  - Panama (PAN) (1)
  - Puerto Rico (PUR) (2)
  - Saint Lucia (LCA) (1)
  - Trinidad and Tobago (TTO) (1)
  - United States (USA) (29)
  - Uruguay (URU) (1)
- Asia-Pacific
  - Australia (AUS) (27)
  - Bahrain (BHR) (8)
  - China (CHN) (15)
  - India (IND) (7)
  - Japan (JPN) (6)
  - Kazakhstan (KAZ) (2)
  - Saudi Arabia (KSA) (1)
  - New Zealand (NZL) (4)
  - Oman (OMA) (1)
  - Thailand (THA) (1)
  - Tajikistan (TJK) (1)
  - Chinese Taipei (TPE) (1)
  - Uzbekistan (UZB) (1)
  - Iran (IRI) (1)
  - Syria (SYR) (1)
- Europe
  - Authorised Neutral Athletes (ANA) (5)
  - Belarus (BLR) (2)
  - Belgium (BEL) (1)
  - Bulgaria (BUL) (2)
  - Croatia (CRO) (1)
  - Czech Republic (CZE) (4)
  - Denmark (DEN) (1)
  - France (FRA) (5)
  - Germany (GER) (8)
  - Great Britain (GBR) (9)
  - Greece (GRE) (3)
  - Hungary (HUN) (1)
  - Italy (ITA) (1)
  - Lithuania (LTU) (1)
  - Netherlands (NED) (4)
  - Norway (NOR) (3)
  - Poland (POL) (9)
  - Portugal (POR) (1)
  - Spain (ESP) (2)
  - Sweden (SWE) (2)
  - Turkey (TUR) (7)
  - Ukraine (UKR) (3)
