= Matthew Hughes (runner) =

Canadian steeplechase runner

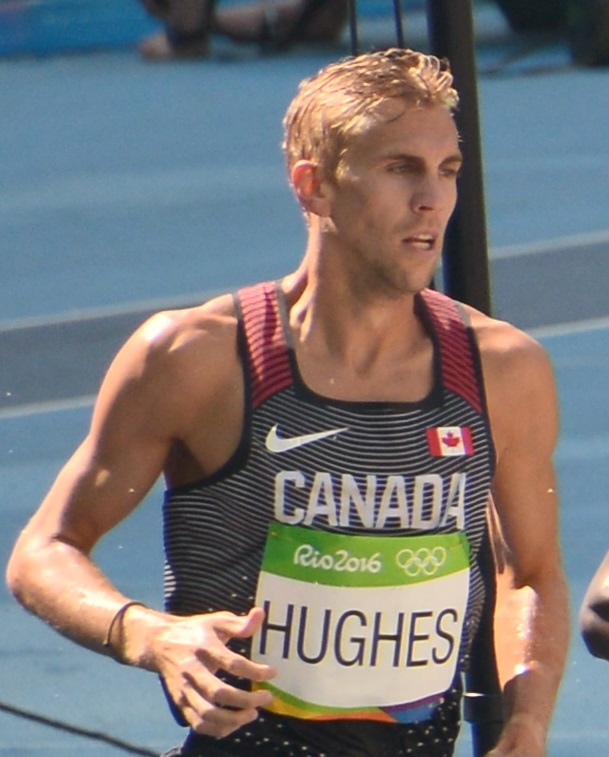
- Hughes at the 2016 Olympics

Personal information
- Born: August 3, 1989 (age 36) Oshawa, Ontario, Canada
- Height: 5 ft 10 in (1.78 m)
- Weight: 134 lb (61 kg)

Sport
- Sport: Athletics
- Events: Steeplechase, 5000 m
- College team: Louisville Cardinals
- Club: Bowerman Track Club
- Coached by: Jerry Schumacher

Achievements and titles
- Personal bests: 3000 mS – 8:11.64 (NR, 2013); 5000 m – 13:19.56 (2015)
Medal record
Representing Canada
Pan American Games
Gold medal – first place	2015 Toronto	3,000 m st.
Continental Cup
Silver medal – second place	2018 Ostrava	3,000 m st.

Matthew Hughes (born August 3, 1989) is a Canadian middle- and long-distance runner. He is the current Canadian record holder for men in the steeplechase, a record which he set at the 2013 World Championships in Athletics.

Hughes was part of the Bowermann Track Club, a Nike-sponsored training group based in Portland, Oregon and coached by Jerry Schumacher.

Hughes retired from professional running in 2022. In 2023 he was elected Deputy Chair of the World Athletics Athletes' Commission, where he is "passionate about making our sport a better place for all and continuing to be a voice for athletes.”.

Hughes competed in the NCAA for the University of Louisville where he was a two-time NCAA champion in the 3000 m steeplechase. He has a degree in sport sciences from that university.

In July 2016, he was named to Canada's Olympic team. He placed tenth in the 3000 m steeplechase at the 2016 Olympics. Hughes placed 14th in the 3000 m steeplechase at the 2019 World Athletics Championships. Competing at his second Olympics at the 2020 Summer Olympics in Tokyo, Hughes placed sixth in the steeplechase, the highest-ever placement for a Canadian in the event.
