= Pieter Conradie =

South African sprinter

Personal information
- Born: 20 October 1994 (age 31) Pretoria, South Africa
- Education: North-West University; University of Texas
- Height: 1.85 m (6 ft 1 in)
- Weight: 76 kg (168 lb)

Sport
- Sport: Athletics
- Event: 400 m
- College team: Texas Longhorns
Medal record
Men's athletics
Representing South Africa
African Championships
| Silver medal – second place | 2018 Asaba | 4×400 m |

Pieter Jacobus Conradie (born 20 October 1994) is a South African sprinter specialising in the 400 metres.

== International competitions ==
| Year | Competition | Venue | Position | Event | Notes |
Representing South Africa
| 2011 | World Youth Championships | Lille, France | 13th (sf) | 400 m | 47.58 |
| 2011 | World Youth Championships | Lille, France | – | Medley relay | DQ |
| 2011 | Commonwealth Youth Games | Douglas, Isle of Man | 4th | 400 m | 49.04 |
| 2011 | Commonwealth Youth Games | Douglas, Isle of Man | 1st | 4 × 100 m relay | 41.00 |
| 2012 | World Junior Championships | Barcelona, Spain | 14th (sf) | 400 m | 46.87 |
| 2012 | World Junior Championships | Barcelona, Spain | 11th (h) | 4 × 100 m relay | 39.87 |
| 2012 | World Junior Championships | Barcelona, Spain | – | 4 × 400 m relay | DQ |
| 2013 | Universiade | Kazan, Russia | 3rd | 4 × 400 m relay | 3:06.19 |
| 2015 | Universiade | Gwangju, South Korea | 15th (sf) | 400 m | 46.84 |
| 2015 | Universiade | Gwangju, South Korea | 1st (h) | 4 × 400 m relay | 3:04.79^{1} |
| 2016 | African Championships | Durban, South Africa | 11th (sf) | 400 m | 46.94 |
| 2017 | World Championships | London, United Kingdom | 40th (h) | 400 m | 46.62 |
| 2018 | African Championships | Asaba, Nigeria | 26th (h) | 400 m | 48.34 |
| 2018 | African Championships | Asaba, Nigeria | 2nd | 4 × 400 m relay | 3:03.50 |
| 2019 | World Relays | Yokohama, Japan | 6th | 4 × 400 m relay | 3:05.32 |

^{1}Disqualified in the final

== Personal bests ==
Outdoor

- 200 metres – 21.31(0.0 m/s, Potchefstroom 2018)
- 400 metres – 45.15 (Potchefstroom2017)
- 800 metres – 1:48.08 (Johannesburg 2016)

Indoor

- 200 metres – 22.23 (Albuquerque 2014)
- 400 metres – 48.39 (Albuquerque 2014)
