= Baboloki Thebe =

Botswana sprinter (born 1997)

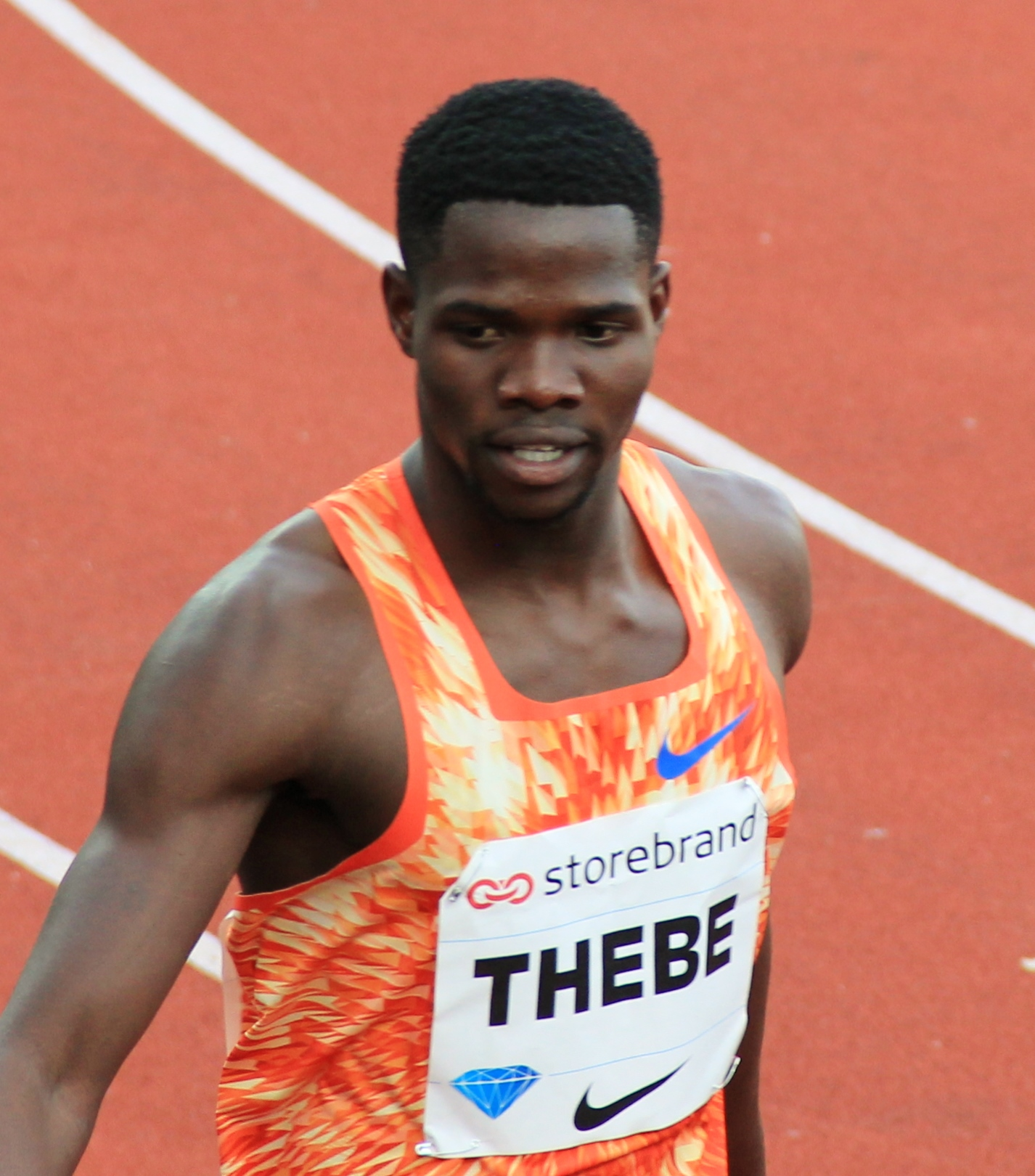
- Thebe in 2017

Personal information
- Born: March 18, 1997 (age 29) Ramonaka, Botswana
- Height: 1.74 m (5 ft 9 in)
- Weight: 63 kg (139 lb)

Sport
- Country: Botswana
- Sport: Track and field
- Event: 400 metres
- Coached by: Mogomotsi Otsetswe
Medal record
Men's athletics
Representing Botswana
Olympic Games
Bronze medal – third place	2020 Tokyo	4×400 m relay
African Championships
Gold medal – first place	2016 Durban	400 m
Gold medal – first place	2016 Durban	4×400 m
Gold medal – first place	2018 Asaba	400 m
Summer Youth Olympics
Silver medal – second place	2014 Nanjing	200 m
Continental Cup
Silver medal – second place	2018 Ostrava	400 m

Baboloki Tirelo Thebe (born 18 March 1997) is a Botswana track and field sprinter who specialises in the 400 metres. He was a silver medallist in the 200 metres at the 2014 Summer Youth Olympics. He reached the semi-finals at the 2014 World Junior Championships in Athletics. He made a breakthrough in the 400 m in May 2016 with a run of 44.22 seconds, placing him third on the global seasonal lists and moving him into the all-time top 30 for the event. He competed at the 2016 Summer Olympics. His personal best in 400 meters is 44.02, which he ran in July 2017

== International competitions ==
Year	Competition	Venue	Position	Event	Notes
2014	African Youth Games	Gaborone, Botswana	3rd	100 m	10.65
2014	African Youth Games	Gaborone, Botswana	1st	200 m	20.85
2014	World Junior Championships	Eugene, United States	17th (sf)	200 m	21.28
2014	World Junior Championships	Eugene, United States	10th	4 × 100 m relay	40.53
2014	World Junior Championships	Eugene, United States	5th (h)	4 × 400 m relay	3:07.80^{1}
2014	Youth Olympic Games	Nanjing, China	2nd	200 m	21.20
2015	African Junior Championships	Addis Ababa, Ethiopia	7th (h)	100 m	11.06^{3}
2016	African Championships	Durban, South Africa	1st	400 m	44.69
2016	African Championships	Durban, South Africa	1st	4 × 400 m relay	3:02.20
2016	World U20 Championships	Bydgoszcz, Poland	2nd (h)	400 m	46.25^{2}
2016	World U20 Championships	Bydgoszcz, Poland	13th (h)	4 × 100 m relay	40.41
2016	World U20 Championships	Bydgoszcz, Poland	2nd	4 × 400 m relay	3:02.81
2016	Olympic Games	Rio de Janeiro, Brazil	14th (h)	400 m	45.41^{3}
2016	Olympic Games	Rio de Janeiro, Brazil	5th	4 × 400 m relay	2:59.06
2017	IAAF World Relays	Nassau, Bahamas	2nd	4 × 400 m relay	3:02.28
2017	World Championships	London, United Kingdom	4th	400 m	44.66
2017	World Championships	London, United Kingdom	14th (h)	4 × 400 m relay	3:06.50
2018	Commonwealth Games	Gold Coast, Australia	2nd	400 m	45.09
2018	Commonwealth Games	Gold Coast, Australia	1st	4 × 400 m relay	3:01.78
2018	African Championships	Asaba, Nigeria	1st	400 m	44.81
2019	African Games	Rabat, Morocco	–	200 m	DNF
2021	Olympic Games	Tokyo, Japan	3rd	4 × 400 m relay	2:57.27
2023	World Championships	Budapest, Hungary	4th (h)	4 × 400 m relay	2:59.42^{1}

^{1}: Disqualified in the final
^{2}: Disqualified in the semifinals
^{3}: Did not start in the semifinals
