= Sadam Koumi =

Sudanese sprinter (born 1994)

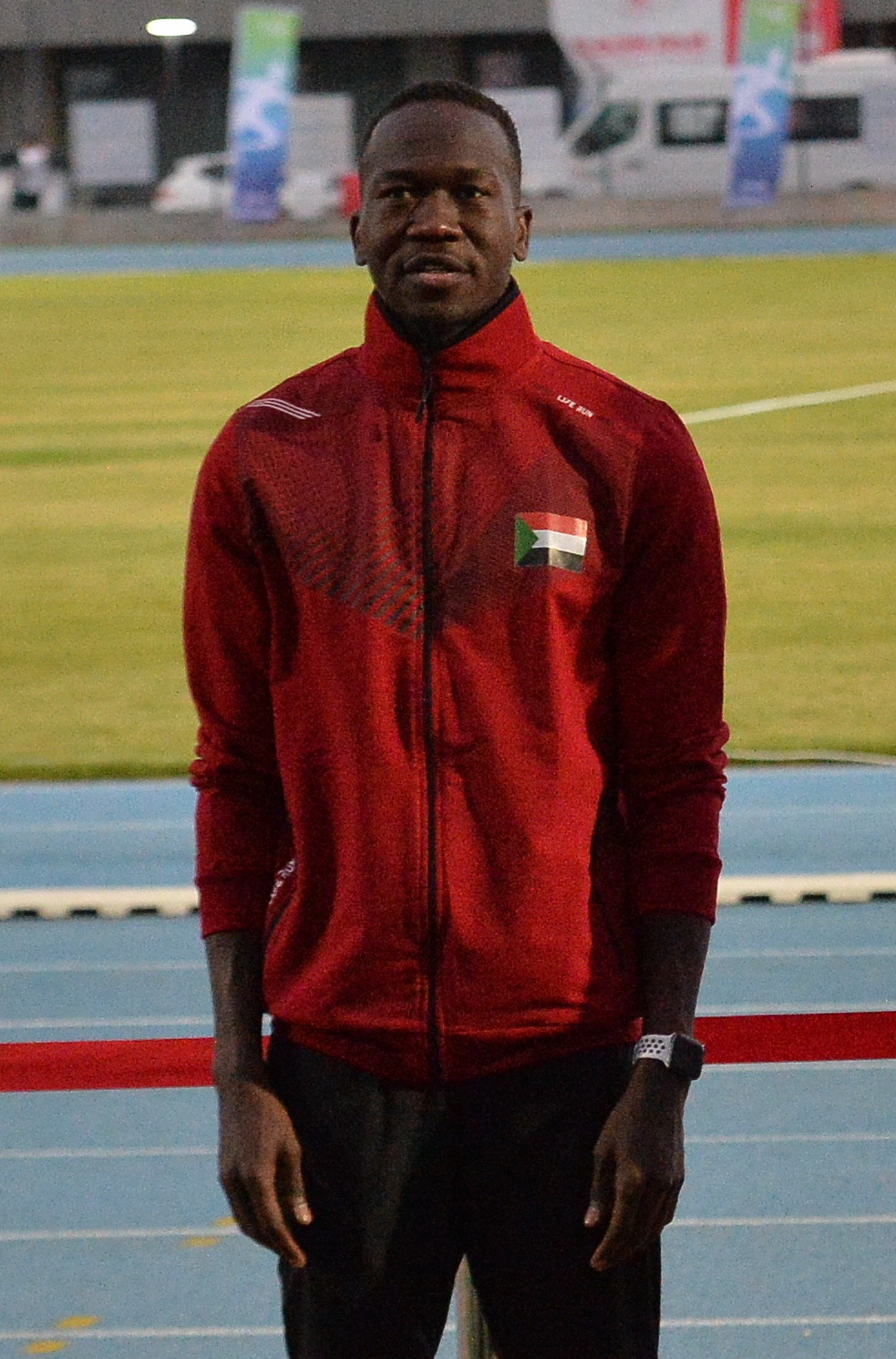
- Sadam Koumi in 2022

Personal information
- Nationality: Sudan
- Born: 6 April 1994 (age 32)

Sport
- Sport: Athletics

Achievements and titles
- Personal bests: 200 m: 21.97 (Loughborough 2018); 400 m: 45.41 (Brazzaville 2015)
Medal record
Men's athletics
Representing Sudan
Islamic Solidarity Games
Silver medal – second place	2021 Konya	800 m
African Junior Championships
Gold medal – first place	2011 Gaborone	400 m
Gold medal – first place	2011 Gaborone	4×400 m relay

Sadam Suliman Koumi el-Nour (born 6 April 1994) is a Sudanese sprinter.

Koumi was a finalist in the 400 metres at the 2011 World Youth Championships in Athletics, but did not finish the race due to injury. The same year he won gold medals in the 400 metres and the 4 × 400 metres relay at the 2011 African Junior Championships.

Also in the 4 × 400 metres relay, he was also part of the Sudanese squad that finished fourth at the 2010 African Championships and sixth at the 2016 African Championships. Individually he finished fifth at the 2015 African Games. He was disqualified in the final at the 2016 African Championships.

He competed in the men's 400 metres at the 2020 Summer Olympics.
