= Ramonaka =

Village in Kgatleng District of Botswana

Coordinates: 24°34′47″S 26°28′6″E

Location of Ramonaka

Ramonaka is a village in Kgatleng District of Botswana. The village is located 65 km east of Gaborone, and it has a primary school. The population was 518 in 2001 census.
