= Orukpe Erayokan =

Nigerian sprinter (born 1993)

Personal information
- Born: 20 December 1993 (age 32) Uromi, Edo State, Nigeria
- Height: 1.5 m (4 ft 11 in)
- Weight: 73 kg (161 lb)

Sport
- Country: Nigeria
- Sport: Athletics
- Sprint: 400 m
- Club: NSCDC

Achievements and titles
- Personal best: 400 m: 44.95 s (2015)
Medal record
Men's athletics
Representing Nigeria
African Championships
Bronze medal – third place	2018 Asaba	4×400 m
- Updated on 27 July 2016

Orukpe Erayokan (born 20 December 1993 in Uromi, Edo State) is a Nigerian sprinter. His main event is the 400 metres. He is a two-time All-Africa Games finalist.

Erayokan won the 400 m at the 18th Nigerian National Sports Festival in 2012 ahead of Abbas Abubakar and Gerald Odeka. He represented his country at the 2014 Commonwealth Games, running in the 4 x 400 m. He also represented Nigeria at the 2015 IAAF World Relays.

2015 seemed a breakthrough year for Erayokan. Erayokan was selected for the individual 400 m at the Brazzaville African Games. He had only previously been in the relay pool at international competitions. At the Brazzaville African Games, he went under 46 s for the first time in his career, running 45.84 in the heats. He bettered that in the semifinal with a sub 45 s clocking of 44.95 s, earning him a spot in the final. In the final, he finished 6th in 45.73 s.

He was selected to represent Nigeria at the Portland Indoor Championships. He however did not run because he arrived Portland too close to the start of the 400 m heats. He also competed at the 2016 African Championships in Durban but did not make the final.
