= Thapelo Phora =

South African Olympic sprinter

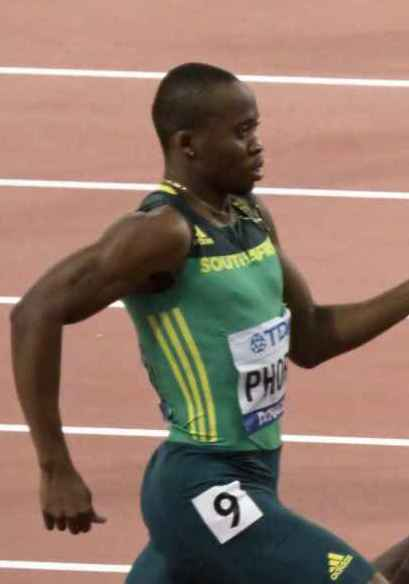
- Phora in 2019

Personal information
- Born: 21 November 1991 (age 34)

Sport
- Country: South Africa
- Sport: Track and field
- Event: 4 × 400 metres relay
Medal record
Men's athletics
Representing South Africa
African Games
Silver medal – second place	2019 Rabat	400 m
Silver medal – second place	2019 Rabat	4x400 m
African Championships
Silver medal – second place	2018 Asaba	400 m
Silver medal – second place	2018 Asaba	4×400 m

Thapelo Phora (born 21 November 1991) is a South African sprinter. He competed in the 4 × 400 metres relay at the 2016 IAAF World Indoor Championships. In 2019, he won the silver medal in the men's 4 × 400 metres relay at the 2019 African Games held in Rabat, Morocco. He also won the silver medal in the men's 400 metres.

He competed in the men's 400 metres and the men's 4 x 400 metres relay at the 2020 Summer Olympics.
