= 2018 African Championships in Athletics =

2018 African Championships
- Dates: 1–5 August
- Host city: Asaba, Nigeria
- Venue: Stephen Keshi Stadium
- Events: 44
- Records set: 7 CR

The 21st African Championships in Athletics was held in Asaba, Nigeria from 1 to 5 August 2018 at the Stephen Keshi Stadium. It was the second time that Nigeria hosted this competition. 800 athletes from 52 African countries participated.

== Medal summary ==
=== Men ===
Chronology: 2014 | 2016 | 2018 | 2020 | 2022

Event	Gold		Silver		Bronze	
100 metres (wind: -2.1 m/s)	Akani Simbine; South Africa	10.25	Arthur Cissé; Ivory Coast	10.33	Simon Magakwe; South Africa	10.35
200 metres	Ncincihli Titi; South Africa	20.46	Divine Oduduru; Nigeria	20.60	Luxolo Adams; South Africa	20.60
400 metres	Baboloki Thebe; Botswana	44.81	Thapelo Phora; South Africa	45.14	Chidi Okezie; Nigeria	45.65
800 metres	Nijel Amos; Botswana	1:45.20	Emmanuel Korir; Kenya	1:45.65	Mostafa Smaili; Morocco	1:45.90
1500 metres	Elijah Manangoi; Kenya	3:35.20 CR	Timothy Cheruiyot; Kenya	3:35.93	Ronald Musagala; Uganda	3:36.41
5000 metres	Edward Zakayo; Kenya	13:48.58	Getaneh Molla; Ethiopia	13:49.06	Yemane Haileselassie; Eritrea	13:49.58
10,000 metres	Jemal Yimer; Ethiopia	29:08.01	Andamlak Belihu; Ethiopia	29:11.09	Timothy Toroitich; Uganda	29:11.87
110 metres hurdles (wind: -0.9 m/s)	Antonio Alkana; South Africa	13.51	Oyeniyi Abejoye; Nigeria	13.87	Welington Zaza; Liberia	13.88
400 metres hurdles	Abdelmalik Lahoulou; Algeria	48.47 NR	Cornel Fredericks; South Africa	49.40	Zied Azizi; Tunisia	49.48
3000 metres steeplechase	Conseslus Kipruto; Kenya	8:26.38	Soufiane El Bakkali; Morocco	8:28.01	Getnet Wale; Ethiopia	8:30.87
4 × 100 metres relay	South Africa; Henricho Bruintjies; Simon Magakwe; Emile Erasmus; Akani Simbine; Ncincihli Titi*	38.25 CR	Nigeria; Ogho-Oghene Egwero; Ejowvokoghene Oduduru; Emmanuel Arowolo; Seye Ogunlewe; Enoch Olaoluwa Adegoke*	38.74	Ivory Coast; Gnamien Nehemie N'Goran; Wilfried Koffi Hua; Arthur Cissé; Ben Youssef Meïté	38.92
4 × 400 metres relay	Kenya; Jared Momanyi; Alphas Kishoyian; Aron Koech; Emmanuel Korir	3:00.92 CR	South Africa; Zakithi Nene; Cornel Fredericks; Pieter Conradie; Thapelo Phora; Le Roux Hamman*	3:03.50	Nigeria; Orukpe Eraiyokan; Rilwan Alowonle; Isah Salihu; Chidi Okezie	3:04.88
20 kilometres walk	Samuel Gathimba; Kenya	1:25:14	Lebogang Shange; South Africa	1:25:25	Hassanine Sebei; Tunisia	1:25:25
High jump	Mathew Sawe; Kenya	2.30 m =NR	Chris Moleya; South Africa	2.26 m	Mpho Links; South Africa	2.15 m
Pole vault	Mohamed Romdhana; Tunisia	5.20 m	Valco van Wyk; South Africa	5.10 m	Mejdi Chehata; Tunisia	5.10 m
Long jump	Rushwal Samaai; South Africa	8.45 m CR	Luvo Manyonga; South Africa	8.43 m	Yahya Berrabah; Morocco	8.14 m w
Triple jump	Hugues Fabrice Zango; Burkina Faso	17.11 m NR	Godfrey Khotso Mokoena; South Africa	16.83 m	Yasser Triki; Algeria	16.78 m
Shot put	Chukwuebuka Enekwechi; Nigeria	21.08 m CR	Mohamed Khalif; Egypt	19.33 m	Kyle Blignaut; South Africa	19.05 m
Discus throw	Victor Hogan; South Africa	60.06 m	Werner Visser; South Africa	58.22 m	Elbachir Mbarki; Morocco	54.97 m
Hammer throw	Mostafa Al-Gamel; Egypt	73.50 m	Islam Mohamed; Egypt	70.32 m	Hassan Abdel Gawad; Egypt	69.90 m
Javelin throw	Julius Yego; Kenya	77.34 m	Phil-Mar van Rensburg; South Africa	76.57 m	Kure Adams; Nigeria	75.69 m
Decathlon	Larbi Bouraada; Algeria	8101 pts	Fredriech Pretorius; South Africa	7733 pts	Samuel Osadolor; Nigeria	7095 pts

=== Women ===
Chronology: 2014 | 2016 | 2018 | 2020 | 2022

Event	Gold		Silver		Bronze	
100 metres (wind: -2.3 m/s)	Marie-Josée Ta Lou; Ivory Coast	11.15	Janet Amponsah; Ghana	11.54	Joy Udo-Gabriel; Nigeria	11.58
200 metres (wind: +0.1 m/s)	Marie-Josée Ta Lou; Ivory Coast	22.50	Germaine Abessolo Bivina; Cameroon	23.36	Janet Amponsah; Ghana	23.38
400 metres	Caster Semenya; South Africa	49.96 NR	Christine Botlogetswe; Botswana	51.19	Yinka Ajayi; Nigeria	51.34
800 metres	Caster Semenya; South Africa	1:56.06 CR	Francine Niyonsaba; Burundi	1:57.97	Habitam Alemu; Ethiopia	1:58.86
1500 metres	Winny Chebet; Kenya	4:14.02	Rababe Arafi; Morocco	4:14.12	Malika Akkaoui; Morocco	4:14.17
5000 metres	Hellen Obiri; Kenya	15:47.18	Senbere Teferi; Ethiopia	15:54.48	Meskerem Mamo; Ethiopia	15:57.38
10,000 metres	Stacey Ndiwa; Kenya	31:31.17	Alice Aprot Nawowuna; Kenya	31:36.12	Gete Alemayehu; Ethiopia	32:10.68
100 metres hurdles (wind: -1.4 m/s)	Oluwatobiloba Amusan; Nigeria	12.86	Rikenette Steenkamp; South Africa	13.18	Rosvitha Okou; Ivory Coast	13.39
400 metres hurdles	Lamiae Lhabze; Morocco	56.66	Wenda Nel; South Africa	57.04	Maureen Jelagat Maiyo; Kenya	57.27
3000 metres steeplechase	Beatrice Chepkoech; Kenya	8:59.88 CR	Celliphine Chespol; Kenya	9:09.61	Fancy Cherono; Kenya	9:23.92
4 × 100 metres relay	Nigeria; Joy Udo-Gabriel; Blessing Okagbare; Oluwatobiloba Amusan; Rosemary Chukwuma	43.77	Ivory Coast; Adeline Gouenon; Karel Elodie Ziketh; Rosvitha Okou; Marie-Josée Ta Lou	44.40	Kenya; Eunice Kadogo; Millicent Ndoro; Joan Cherono; Fresha Mwangi	45.58
4 × 400 metres relay	Nigeria; Patience Okon George; Abike Egbeniyi; Folashade Abugan; Yinka Ajayi	3:31.17	Kenya; Maureen Jelagat; Hellen Syombua; Navian Michira; Veronica Mutua	3:35.45	Zambia; Quincy Malekani; Abygirl Sepiso; Rhodah Njobvu; Majory Chisanga	3:38.18
20 kilometres walk	Yehualeye Beletew; Ethiopia	1:31:47 NR	Grace Wanjiru; Kenya	1:35:54	Chahinez Nasri; Tunisia	1:37:28
High jump	Erika Seyama; Eswatini	1.83 m †	Hoda Hagras; Egypt	1.80 m	Ariyat Dibow Ubang; Ethiopia	1.80 m
Pole vault	Dorra Mahfoudhi; Tunisia	4.10 m	Dina Eltabaa; Egypt	4.05 m	Nesrine Brinis; Tunisia	3.90 m
Long jump	Ese Brume; Nigeria	6.83 m	Marthe Koala; Burkina Faso	6.54 m w	Lynique Beneke; South Africa	6.38 m
Triple jump	Grace Anigbata; Nigeria	14.02 m	Zinzi Chabangu; South Africa	13.59 m	Lerato Sechele; Lesotho	13.31 m
Shot put	Ischke Senekal; South Africa	17.24 m	Jessica Inchude; Guinea-Bissau	16.76 m	Meike Strydom; South Africa	15.99 m
Discus throw	Chioma Onyekwere; Nigeria	58.09 m	Chinwe Okoro; Nigeria	57.37 m	Ischke Senekal; South Africa	53.82 m
Hammer throw	Soukaina Zakour; Morocco	68.28 m NR	Temi Ogunrinde; Nigeria	67.39 m NR	Jennifer Batu; Republic of the Congo	66.43 m NR
Javelin throw	Kelechi Nwanaga; Nigeria	56.96 m	Jo-Ane van Dyk; South Africa	53.72 m	Josephine Joyce Lalam; Uganda	51.33 m
Heptathlon	Odile Ahouanwanou; Benin	5999 pts	Marthe Koala; Burkina Faso	5967 pts	Not awarded	

== Medal table ==
* Host nation (Host nation)

Rank	Nation	Gold	Silver	Bronze	Total
1	Kenya (KEN)	11	6	2	19
2	South Africa (RSA)	9	14	8	31
3	Nigeria (NGR)*	9	5	6	20
4	Ethiopia (ETH)	2	3	5	10
5	Ivory Coast (CIV)	2	2	2	6
6	Botswana (BOT)	2	1	0	3
7	Tunisia (TUN)	2	0	5	7
8	Algeria (ALG)	2	0	1	3
9	Egypt (EGY)	1	4	2	7
10	Morocco (MAR)	1	3	4	8
11	Burkina Faso (BFA)	1	2	0	3
12	Benin (BEN)	1	0	0	1
12	Eswatini (SWZ)	1	0	0	1
14	Burundi (BDI)	0	1	0	1
14	Cameroon (CMR)	0	1	0	1
14	Ghana (GHA)	0	1	0	1
14	Guinea-Bissau (GBS)	0	1	0	1
18	Uganda (UGA)	0	0	3	3
19	Congo (CGO)	0	0	1	1
19	Eritrea (ERI)	0	0	1	1
19	Lesotho (LES)	0	0	1	1
19	Liberia (LBR)	0	0	1	1
19	Zambia (ZAM)	0	0	1	1
Totals (23 entries)		44	44	43	131
