= Athletics at the 2018 Mediterranean Games – Results =

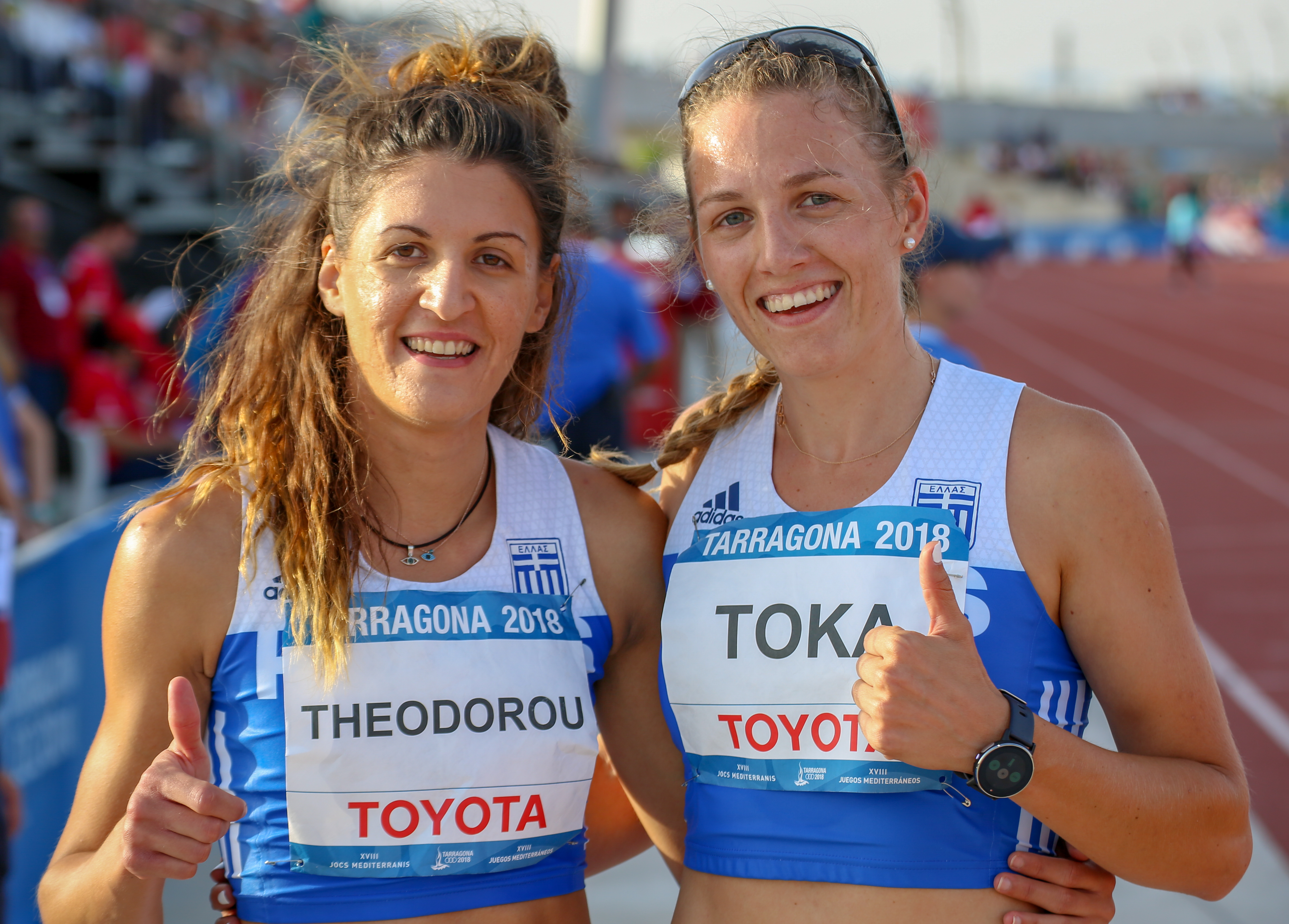
Effrosyni Theodorou and Elpida Toka, 400 metres hurdles

These are the official results of the athletics competition at the 2018 Mediterranean Games which took place between 27 and 30 June 2018 in Tarragona, Spain.

== Men's results ==
=== 100 metres ===
Heats – 27 June
Wind:
Heat 1: -2.4 m/s, Heat 2: -2.2 m/s, Heat 3: -1.8 m/s

Rank	Heat	Name	Nationality	Time	Notes
1	1	Jak Ali Harvey	Turkey	10.34	Q
2	2	Federico Cattaneo	Italy	10.53	Q
3	3	Emre Zafer Barnes	Turkey	10.56	Q
4	2	Ángel David Rodríguez	Spain	10.64	Q
5	2	Ioannis Nyfantopoulos	Greece	10.64	q
6	2	José Pedro Lopes	Portugal	10.66	q
7	2	Amaury Golitin	France	10.67	
8	1	Diogo Antunes	Portugal	10.68	Q
9	1	Arián Téllez	Spain	10.70	
10	3	Mahmoud Hammoudi	Algeria	10.72	Q
11	3	Paisios Dimitriadis	Cyprus	10.77	PB
12	1	Efthymios Stergioulis	Greece	10.89	
13	2	Andreas Chatzitheori	Cyprus	10.94	
14	3	Francesco Molinari	San Marino	11.13	
	1	Stewart Dutamby	France	DNS	
	3	Ayman Elsaaid	Egypt	DNS	

Final – 28 June
Wind:
-0.6 m/s

Rank	Lane	Name	Nationality	Time	Notes
1st place, gold medalist(s)	4	Jak Ali Harvey	Turkey	10.10	SB
2nd place, silver medalist(s)	5	Emre Zafer Barnes	Turkey	10.32	
3rd place, bronze medalist(s)	3	Federico Cattaneo	Italy	10.37	
4	7	Diogo Antunes	Portugal	10.41	
5	1	José Pedro Lopes	Portugal	10.43	
6	6	Ángel David Rodríguez	Spain	10.49	
7	8	Mahmoud Hammoudi	Algeria	10.61	
	2	Ioannis Nyfantopoulos	Greece	DQ	R162.7

=== 200 metres ===
Heats – 28 June
Wind:
Heat 1: +2.6 m/s, Heat 2: +1.3 m/s

Rank	Heat	Name	Nationality	Time	Notes
1	1	Eseosa Desalu	Italy	20.25	Q
2	2	Ramil Guliyev	Turkey	20.50	Q
3	1	Mickaël-Méba Zeze	France	20.52	Q
4	2	Daniel Rodríguez	Spain	20.59	Q, PB
5	2	Davide Manenti	Italy	20.59	Q
6	1	Panagiotis Trivyzas	Greece	20.78	Q
7	2	Paisios Dimitriadis	Cyprus	20.98	q
8	1	David Lima	Portugal	21.01	q
9	2	Rafael Jorge	Portugal	21.04	PB
10	2	Gautier Dautremer	France	21.09	
11	1	Yiğitcan Hekimoğlu	Turkey	21.15	
12	1	Javier Troyano	Spain	21.21	
13	1	Andreas Chatzitheori	Cyprus	21.50	
14	2	Francesco Molinari	San Marino	21.81	
	1	Ayman Elsaaid	Egypt	DNS	

Final – 29 June
Wind:
+0.1 m/s

Rank	Lane	Name	Nationality	Time	Notes
1st place, gold medalist(s)	4	Ramil Guliyev	Turkey	20.15	GR
2nd place, silver medalist(s)	3	Eseosa Desalu	Italy	20.77	
3rd place, bronze medalist(s)	5	Mickaël-Méba Zeze	France	20.78	
4	6	Daniel Rodríguez	Spain	20.79	
5	7	Davide Manenti	Italy	20.96	
6	8	Panagiotis Trivyzas	Greece	21.06	
7	2	Paisios Dimitriadis	Cyprus	21.53	
8	1	David Lima	Portugal	21.54	

=== 400 metres ===
Heats – 27 June

Rank	Heat	Name	Nationality	Time	Notes
1	2	Davide Re	Italy	45.86	Q
2	2	Mamoudou Hanne	France	46.22	Q, SB
3	1	Lucas Búa	Spain	46.46	Q
4	1	Franko Burraj	Albania	46.71	Q
5	2	Yavuz Can	Turkey	46.75	Q
6	1	Michele Tricca	Italy	46.87	Q
7	2	Darwin Echeverry	Spain	46.88	q
8	2	Ricardo dos Santos	Portugal	46.97	q
9	1	Abdullah Tütünci	Turkey	47.65	
10	1	Teddy Atine-Venel	France	48.12	
11	1	Nathan Elias Nammour	Lebanon	49.20	
12	2	Mohammed Al-Ahmar	Libya	50.59	

Final – 28 June

Rank	Lane	Name	Nationality	Time	Notes
1st place, gold medalist(s)	4	Davide Re	Italy	45.26	GR
2nd place, silver medalist(s)	3	Lucas Búa	Spain	45.91	
3rd place, bronze medalist(s)	5	Mamoudou Hanne	France	46.35	SB
4	8	Michele Tricca	Italy	46.35	SB
5	7	Yavuz Can	Turkey	46.37	
6	6	Franko Burraj	Albania	46.58	NR
7	1	Ricardo dos Santos	Portugal	46.64	
8	2	Darwin Echeverry	Spain	46.89	

=== 800 metres ===
Heats – 28 June

Rank	Heat	Name	Nationality	Time	Notes
1	1	Álvaro de Arriba	Spain	1:47.30	Q
2	1	Yassine Hethat	Algeria	1:47.55	Q
3	1	Riadh Chninni	Tunisia	1:47.71	Q
4	1	Abedin Mujezinović	Bosnia and Herzegovina	1:48.12	q
5	1	Giordano Benedetti	Italy	1:48.21	q
6	2	Mostafa Smaili	Morocco	1:49.48	Q
7	2	Mohamed Belbachir	Algeria	1:49.51	Q
8	2	Daniel Andújar	Spain	1:49.55	Q
9	2	Abdessalem Ayouni	Tunisia	1:49.63	
10	2	Gabriel Tual	France	1:49.89	
11	2	Christos Dimitriou	Cyprus	1:50.79	
12	2	Hamada Mohamed	Egypt	1:50.86	
13	2	Musa Hajdari	Kosovo	1:51.26	
14	1	Christos Kotitsas	Greece	1:52.22	
15	1	Žan Rudolf	Slovenia	1:52.79	
16	1	Benjamin Robert	France	1:54.36	
17	1	Astrit Kryeziu	Kosovo	1:55.41	
	2	Levent Ateş	Turkey	DQ	R142.4.c

Final – 30 June

Rank	Name	Nationality	Time	Notes
1st place, gold medalist(s)	Álvaro de Arriba	Spain	1:47.43	
2nd place, silver medalist(s)	Mostafa Smaili	Morocco	1:47.56	
3rd place, bronze medalist(s)	Abedin Mujezinović	Bosnia and Herzegovina	1:48.07	
4	Yassine Hethat	Algeria	1:48.21	
5	Daniel Andújar	Spain	1:48.72	
6	Mohamed Belbachir	Algeria	1:49.41	
7	Giordano Benedetti	Italy	1:50.38	
8	Riadh Chninni	Tunisia	1:50.51	

=== 1500 metres ===
Heats – 27 June

Rank	Heat	Name	Nationality	Time	Notes
1	1	Fouad Elkaam	Morocco	3:43.78	Q
2	1	Abdessalem Ayouni	Tunisia	3:44.22	Q
3	1	Mohad Abdikadar Sheik Ali	Italy	3:44.29	Q
4	1	Ilham Tanui Özbilen	Turkey	3:44.32	Q
5	2	Brahim Kaazouzi	Morocco	3:44.75	Q
6	2	Alexis Miellet	France	3:45.06	Q
7	1	Martin Casse	France	3:45.36	q
8	2	Joao Bussotti	Italy	3:45.53	Q
9	2	Jesús Gómez	Spain	3:45.75	Q
10	2	Andreas Dimitrakis	Greece	3:46.47	q
11	2	Levent Ateş	Turkey	3:47.17	q
12	2	Dario Ivanovski	Macedonia	3:47.91	q, PB
13	2	Marc Alcalá	Spain	3:48.03	
14	1	Hugo Rocha	Portugal	3:49.95	
15	2	Carles Gomez	Andorra	3:56.95	SB
	1	Elzan Bibić	Serbia	DNF	

Final – 29 June

Rank	Name	Nationality	Time	Notes
1st place, gold medalist(s)	Brahim Kaazouzi	Morocco	3:37.14	
2nd place, silver medalist(s)	Abdessalem Ayouni	Tunisia	3:37.35	PB
3rd place, bronze medalist(s)	Fouad Elkaam	Morocco	3:37.78	
4	Alexis Miellet	France	3:38.04	
5	Mohad Abdikadar Sheik Ali	Italy	3:39.60	
6	Martin Casse	France	3:39.75	SB
7	Jesús Gómez	Spain	3:40.43	
8	Joao Bussotti	Italy	3:42.34	
9	Levent Ateş	Turkey	3:43.09	SB
10	Dario Ivanovski	Macedonia	3:47.13	PB
11	Ilham Tanui Özbilen	Turkey	3:48.27	
12	Andreas Dimitrakis	Greece	3:51.12	

=== 5000 metres ===
27 June

Rank	Name	Nationality	Time	Notes
1st place, gold medalist(s)	Younès Essalhi	Morocco	13:56.12	
2nd place, silver medalist(s)	Soufiyan Bouqantar	Morocco	13:56.28	
3rd place, bronze medalist(s)	Yemaneberhan Crippa	Italy	13:56.53	
4	Antonio Abadía	Spain	13:56.74	
5	Fernando Carro	Spain	13:57.26	
6	Lorenzo Dini	Italy	13:59.25	
7	Markos Gkourlias	Greece	13:59.59	PB
8	Jimmy Gressier	France	14:01.13	PB
9	Felix Bour	France	14:02.35	
10	Polat Kemboi Arıkan	Turkey	14:03.33	
11	Samuel Barata	Portugal	14:14.93	
12	Ramazan Özdemir	Turkey	14:18.14	
13	Elzan Bibić	Serbia	14:32.05	
14	Georgios Michalis Tassis	Greece	14:38.33	PB

=== Half marathon ===
30 June

Rank	Name	Nationality	Time	Notes
1st place, gold medalist(s)	Mohamed Reda El Aaraby	Morocco	1:04:03	GR, Yellow card
2nd place, silver medalist(s)	Eyob Faniel	Italy	1:04:07	
3rd place, bronze medalist(s)	Kaan Kigen Özbilen	Turkey	1:04:19	
4	Daniele Meucci	Italy	1:04:37	Yellow card
5	Atef Saad	Tunisia	1:04:54	
6	Yassine Rachik	Italy	1:05:01	
7	Abdenasir Fathi	Morocco	1:05:12	Yellow card
8	Javier Guerra	Spain	1:05:19	
9	Benjamin Malaty	France	1:07:13	
10	Mohamed Hrezi	Libya	1:07:57	
11	Mehdi Frère	France	1:08:32	
12	Saffet Elkatmış	Turkey	1:09:00	
13	Maamar Bengriba	Algeria	1:09:03	
14	Charlton Debono	Malta	1:12:21	
15	Konstantinos Gkelaouzos	Greece	1:13:12	
	Ayad Lamdassem	Spain	DNF	
	Christos Kallias	Greece	DNF	
	Bekir Karayel	Turkey	DNF	
	Farid Terfia	Algeria	DQ	R240.10
	Benjamin Choquert	France	DNS	

=== 110 metres hurdles ===
30 June
Wind: -0.6 m/s

Rank	Lane	Name	Nationality	Time	Notes
1st place, gold medalist(s)	3	Lorenzo Perini	Italy	13.49	PB
2nd place, silver medalist(s)	5	Yidiel Contreras	Spain	13.54	
3rd place, bronze medalist(s)	4	Konstantinos Douvalidis	Greece	13.67	
4	2	Simon Krauss	France	13.77	SB
5	6	Benjamin Sedecias	France	13.86	
6	7	Hassane Fofana	Italy	13.89	
7	1	Mohamed Koussi	Morocco	14.45	
	8	Rami Gharsali	Tunisia	DNS	

=== 400 metres hurdles ===
Heats – 27 June

Rank	Heat	Name	Nationality	Time	Notes
1	2	Ludvy Vaillant	France	50.02	Q
2	1	Yasmani Copello	Turkey	50.07	Q
3	1	José Bencosme de Leon	Italy	50.28	Q
4	2	Zied Azizi	Tunisia	50.36	Q
5	2	Abdelmalik Lahoulou	Algeria	50.54	Q
6	1	Muhammad Abdallah Kounta	France	50.58	Q
7	1	Saber Boukmouche	Algeria	50.64	q
8	1	Mark Ujakpor	Spain	50.84	q
9	2	Mattia Contini	Italy	50.86	
10	2	Javier Delgado	Spain	51.44	
11	2	Sinan Ören	Turkey	51.59	
12	2	Konstantinos Nakos	Greece	51.65	
13	1	Rusmir Malkočević	Bosnia and Herzegovina	53.02	
14	1	Andrea Ercolani Volta	San Marino	53.14	

Final – 29 June

Rank	Lane	Name	Nationality	Time	Notes
1st place, gold medalist(s)	4	Ludvy Vaillant	France	48.76	GR
2nd place, silver medalist(s)	3	Yasmani Copello	Turkey	48.76	GR
3rd place, bronze medalist(s)	6	Zied Azizi	Tunisia	49.13	PB
4	7	Abdelmalik Lahoulou	Algeria	49.45	SB
5	5	José Bencosme de Leon	Italy	49.58	SB
6	2	Saber Boukmouche	Algeria	50.16	
7	8	Muhammad Abdallah Kounta	France	50.18	PB
8	1	Mark Ujakpor	Spain	51.23	

=== 3000 metres steeplechase ===
27 June

Rank	Name	Nationality	Time	Notes
1st place, gold medalist(s)	Soufiane El Bakkali	Morocco	8:20.97	
2nd place, silver medalist(s)	Amor Ben Yahia	Tunisia	8:26.14	
3rd place, bronze medalist(s)	Yohanes Chiappinelli	Italy	8:32.06	
4	Eric Peñalver	Spain	8:33.95	
5	Abderraouf Boubaker	Tunisia	8:35.66	
6	Osama Zoghlami	Italy	8:36.28	
7	Hicham Bouchicha	Algeria	8:40.43	
8	Daniel Arce	Spain	8:43.67	
9	Igor Bougnot	France	8:51.82	
10	Aras Kaya	Turkey	8:59.48	
11	Nikolas Fragkou	Cyprus	9:09.14	
12	Louis Gilavert	France	9:12.44	
13	Nikolaos Gkotsis	Greece	9:14.90	
	Mohamed Tindouft	Morocco	DNF	
	Tarik Langat Akdag	Turkey	DNF	

=== 4 × 100 metres relay ===
30 June

Rank	Lane	Nation	Competitors	Time	Notes
1st place, gold medalist(s)	5	Italy	Federico Cattaneo, Eseosa Desalu, Davide Manenti, Filippo Tortu	38.49	GR
2nd place, silver medalist(s)	7	Turkey	Emre Zafer Barnes, Jak Ali Harvey, Yiğitcan Hekimoğlu, Ramil Guliyev	38.50	
3rd place, bronze medalist(s)	3	Portugal	José Pedro Lopes, Diogo Antunes, Ancuiam Lopes, Rafael Jorge	39.28	
4	4	Spain	Javier Troyano, Ángel David Rodríguez, Daniel Rodríguez, Arián Téllez	39.52	
5	6	Greece	Efthymios Stergioulis, Ioannis Nyfantopoulos, Panagiotis Trivyzas, Konstantinos Zikos	39.72	

=== 4 × 400 metres relay ===
30 June

Rank	Nation	Competitors	Time	Notes
1st place, gold medalist(s)	Italy	Giuseppe Leonardi, Michele Tricca, Matteo Galvan, Davide Re	3:03.54	
2nd place, silver medalist(s)	Spain	Lucas Búa, David Jiménez, Mark Ujakpor, Darwin Echeverry	3:04.71	
3rd place, bronze medalist(s)	Algeria	Fethi Benchaa, Saber Boukmouche, Mohamed Belbachir, Abdelmalik Lahoulou	3:05.28	
4	Turkey	Batuhan Altıntaş, Yasmani Copello, Siran Ören, Yavuz Can	3:05.28	

=== High jump ===
29 June

Rank	Name	Nationality	2.00	2.05	2.10	2.15	2.20	2.23	2.26	2.28	2.32	Result	Notes
1st place, gold medalist(s)	Majd Eddin Ghazal	Syria	–	–	–	o	o	o	o	xo	x	2.28	
2nd place, silver medalist(s)	Konstadinos Baniotis	Greece	–	–	–	–	xo	o	–	xxx		2.23	
3rd place, bronze medalist(s)	Marco Fassinotti	Italy	–	–	–	o	xo	xxo	xxx			2.23	
4	Vasilios Konstantinou	Cyprus	–	–	o	xo	o	xxx				2.20	
5	Simón Siverio	Spain	–	o	o	xo	xxo	–	xxx			2.20	
6	Eugenio Rossi	San Marino	o	o	o	xo	xxx					2.15	
7	Mickaël Hanany	France	–	–	xxo	xxx						2.10	
8	Matteo Mosconi	San Marino	o	o	xxx							2.05	
	Alperen Acet	Turkey										DNS	
	Paulo Conceição	Portugal										DNS	

=== Long jump ===
Qualification – 27 June
Qualifying standard: 7.90 metres

Rank	Group	Name	Nationality	#1	#2	#3	Result	Notes
1	B	Augustin Bey	France	7.48	7.90		7.90	Q
2	A	Michail Mertzanidis-Despoteris	Greece	x	7.65	7.88	7.88	q, SB
3	B	Yahya Berrabah	Morocco	7.85	7.78w	–	7.85	q
4	B	Héctor Santos	Spain	7.80	x	7.57	7.80	q
5	B	İzmir Smajlaj	Albania	7.61	7.77	–	7.77	q
6	A	Alper Kulaksız	Turkey	7.53	7.62	7.75	7.75	q, SB
7	B	Miguel Marques	Portugal	7.75	–	–	7.75	q, PB
8	A	Jean Marie Okutu	Spain	7.47	7.61	7.74	7.74	q
9	B	Kevin Ojiaku	Italy	7.64	7.55w	–	7.64	q
10	B	Yasser Mohamed Triki	Algeria	x	x	7.54	7.54	q
11	A	Yann Randrianasolo	France	7.50	7.51	5.46	7.51	q
12	A	Mouhcine Khoua	Morocco	7.44	x	x	7.44	q
13	A	Mohammed Amin Al-Salameh	Syria	7.05	7.43	7.43	7.43	PB
14	B	Anastasios Galazoulas	Greece	x	x	7.36w	7.36w	
	A	Franko Burraj	Albania				DNS	
	A	Filippo Randazzo	Italy				DNS	

Final – 30 June

Rank	Name	Nationality	#1	#2	#3	#4	#5	#6	Result	Notes
1st place, gold medalist(s)	Yahya Berrabah	Morocco	7.71	7.68	x	7.61	8.02	7.60	8.02	
2nd place, silver medalist(s)	Yasser Mohamed Triki	Algeria	7.80	7.86	8.01	x	x	x	8.01	SB
3rd place, bronze medalist(s)	Yann Randrianasolo	France	7.90	7.74	7.17	7.48	7.84	6.11	7.90	
4	Izmir Smajlaj	Albania	7.79	7.85	6.33	x	7.72	x	7.85	SB
5	Alper Kulaksız	Turkey	7.61	7.67	7.52	7.54	7.79	7.73	7.79	SB
6	Jean Marie Okutu	Spain	7.51	7.71	7.62	7.64	7.71	7.78	7.78	
7	Kevin Ojiaku	Italy	7.62	7.72	7.76	7.50	x	6.66	7.76	
8	Michail Mertzanidis-Despoteris	Greece	7.27	7.60	7.65	7.73	7.47	7.63	7.73	
9	Augustin Bey	France	7.50	x	7.50				7.50	
10	Héctor Santos	Spain	x	7.48	7.27				7.48	
11	Mouhcine Khoua	Morocco	x	x	7.43				7.43	
	Miguel Marques	Portugal							DNS	

=== Shot put ===
Qualification – 27 June

Rank	Group	Name	Nationality	#1	#2	#3	Result	Notes
1	A	Stipe Žunić	Croatia	19.61	19.64	20.09	20.09	q
2	B	Mesud Pezer	Bosnia and Herzegovina	x	18.73	20.00	20.00	q
3	A	Osman Can Özdeveci	Turkey	x	19.45	x	19.45	q
4	A	Hamza Alić	Bosnia and Herzegovina	19.27	x	x	19.27	q
5	B	Carlos Tobalina	Spain	18.22	19.21	–	19.21	q
6	A	Mohamed Magdi Hamza Khalif	Egypt	19.02	x	18.23	19.02	q
7	B	Filip Mihaljević	Croatia	18.14	18.72	x	18.72	q
8	B	Leonardo Fabbri	Italy	17.23	18.55	18.34	18.55	q
9	B	Mostafa Amr Hassan	Egypt	17.71	18.55	x	18.55	q
10	A	Anastasios Latifllari	Greece	17.48	17.95	18.37	18.37	q
11	A	Sebastiano Bianchetti	Italy	17.83	17.88	18.10	18.10	q
12	A	Francisco Belo	Portugal	17.72	18.00	17.84	18.00	q
13	A	Borja Vivas	Spain	17.83	17.98	x	17.98	
14	B	Blaž Zupančič	Slovenia	17.17	x	17.74	17.74	
15	B	Willy Vicaut	France	16.74	17.18	17.46	17.46	
16	B	Kyriakos Zotos	Greece	16.62	16.92	17.16	17.16	

Final – 27 June

Rank	Name	Nationality	#1	#2	#3	#4	#5	#6	Result	Notes
1st place, gold medalist(s)	Hamza Alić	Bosnia and Herzegovina	19.86	19.73	x	x	20.43	19.83	20.43	SB
2nd place, silver medalist(s)	Stipe Žunić	Croatia	x	19.67	20.21	x	x	20.20	20.21	
3rd place, bronze medalist(s)	Mesud Pezer	Bosnia and Herzegovina	19.70	x	19.61	x	19.46	19.82	19.82	
4	Sebastiano Bianchetti	Italy	18.86	19.71	18.74	19.03	x	x	19.71	SB
5	Osman Can Özdeveci	Turkey	19.12	19.47	19.44	19.58	19.27	19.56	19.58	
6	Filip Mihaljević	Croatia	19.16	x	19.56	x	x	x	19.56	
7	Francisco Belo	Portugal	18.83	19.39	x	x	x	x	19.39	SB
8	Carlos Tobalina	Spain	18.62	19.05	18.41	18.56	19.20	19.28	19.28	
9	Anastasios Latifllari	Greece	18.21	x	18.84				18.84	
10	Mohamed Magdi Hamza Khalif	Egypt	x	18.58	x				18.58	
11	Mostafa Amr Hassan	Egypt	17.64	18.35	18.25				18.35	
12	Leonardo Fabbri	Italy	x	x	17.72				17.72	

=== Discus throw ===
Qualification – 27 June

Rank	Group	Name	Nationality	#1	#2	#3	Result	Notes
1	A	Kristjan Čeh	Slovenia	58.59	58.11	61.98	61.98	q, PB
2	B	Giovanni Faloci	Italy	60.12	x	58.67	60.12	q
3	A	Apostolos Parellis	Cyprus	57.14	56.91	56.90	57.14	q
4	A	Hannes Kirchler	Italy	x	54.94	56.83	56.83	q
5	A	Georgios Tremos	Greece	53.44	52.39	56.58	56.58	q
6	B	Lois Maikel Martínez	Spain	'55.92 '	x	x	55.92	q
7	A	Martin Marković	Croatia	55.62	55.19	55.51	55.62	q
8	A	Frank Casañas	Spain	55.39	53.90	x	55.39	q
9	A	Jordan Guehaseim	France	52.01	51.12	53.47	53.47	q
10	B	Tadej Hribar	Slovenia	52.83	x	53.22	53.22	q
11	B	Elbachir Mbarki	Morocco	51.50	51.32	50.92	51.50	q
12	A	Ivan Kukuličić	Montenegro	50.77	50.02	x	50.77	q
13	B	Iason Thanopoulos	Greece	49.50	50.15	48.96	50.15	
14	B	Tom Reux	France	45.98	x	49.18	49.18	
	B	Francisco Belo	Portugal				DNS	

Final – 29 June

Rank	Name	Nationality	#1	#2	#3	#4	#5	#6	Result	Notes
1st place, gold medalist(s)	Apostolos Parellis	Cyprus	61.26	62.98	x	60.71	61.32	62.01	62.98	
2nd place, silver medalist(s)	Kristjan Čeh	Slovenia	x	60.37	60.02	61.52	62.03	x	62.03	PB
3rd place, bronze medalist(s)	Hannes Kirchler	Italy	60.64	x	58.81	x	x	x	60.64	
4	Giovanni Faloci	Italy	x	x	56.82	x	x	60.16	60.16	
5	Lois Maikel Martínez	Spain	56.20	55.02	56.83	58.48	57.31	58.61	58.61	
6	Martin Marković	Croatia	56.47	58.18	x	55.74	56.08	57.83	58.18	
7	Georgios Tremos	Greece	54.21	56.94	x	56.11	57.55	57.84	57.84	
8	Jordan Guehaseim	France	56.37	56.94	56.85	53.91	56.95	x	56.95	SB
9	Tadej Hribar	Slovenia	55.80	55.24	54.13				55.80	
10	Frank Casañas	Spain	55.00	x	55.73				55.73	
11	Elbachir Mbarki	Morocco	50.99	54.50	52.68				54.50	
12	Ivan Kukuličić	Montenegro	53.09	52.45	52.36				53.09	

=== Javelin throw ===
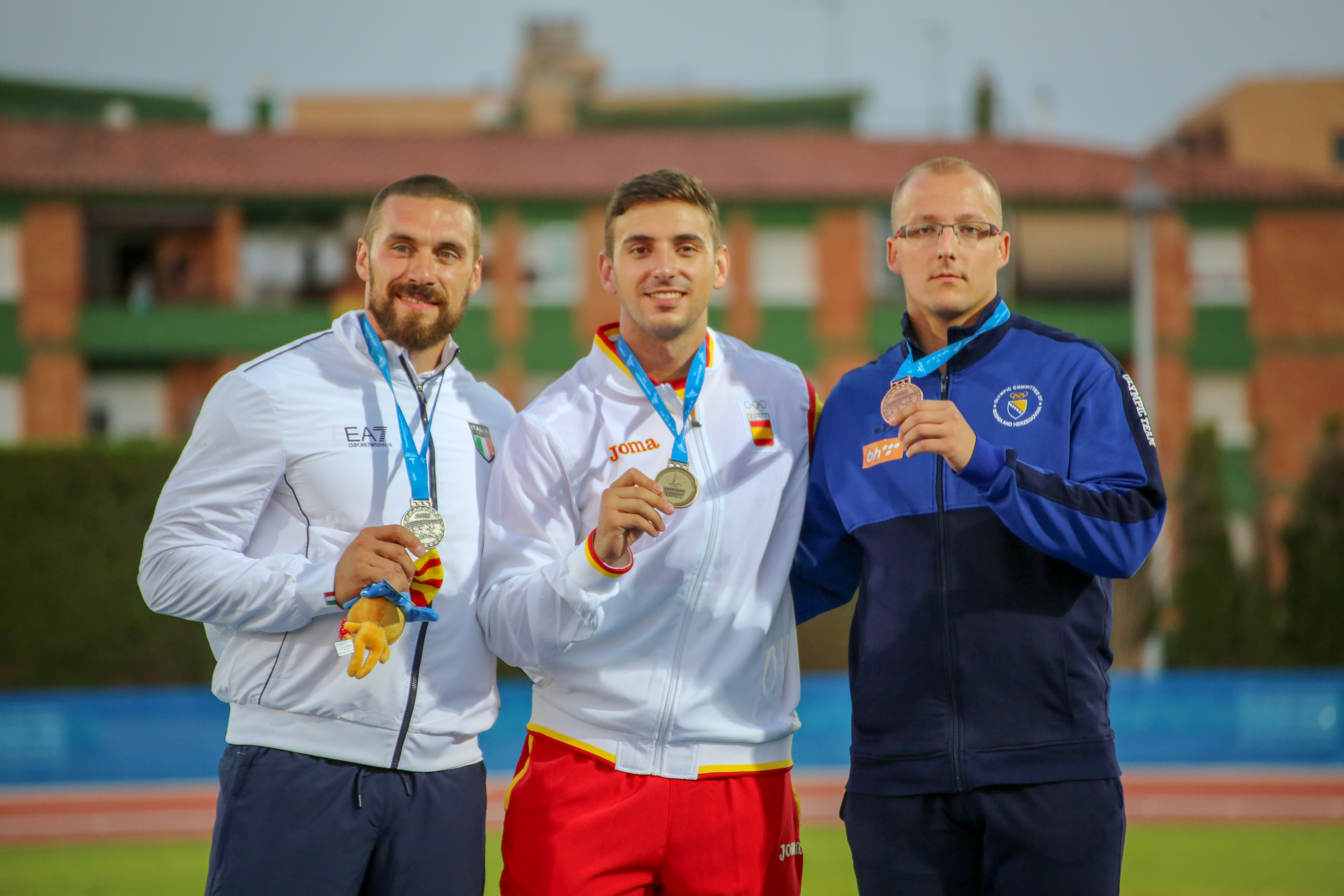
Medallists at the javelin throw

30 June

Rank	Name	Nationality	#1	#2	#3	#4	#5	#6	Result	Notes
1st place, gold medalist(s)	Nicolás Quijera	Spain	71.58	67.75	73.01	75.13	x	x	75.13	
2nd place, silver medalist(s)	Roberto Bertolini	Italy	70.80	73.58	x	x	68.91	74.81	74.81	
3rd place, bronze medalist(s)	Dejan Mileusnić	Bosnia and Herzegovina	60.23	68.99	70.85	71.48	71.95	66.59	71.95	
4	Emin Öncel	Turkey	70.06	70.90	70.64	71.85	x	71.38	71.85	
5	Fatih Avan	Turkey	69.94	70.29	71.59	71.71	x	66.45	71.71	
6	Lukas Moutarde	France	62.14	66.03	66.05	66.15	66.07	69.59	69.59	
7	Maged Amer	Egypt	65.95	57.19	68.48	60.99	68.86	64.27	68.86	
8	Odei Jainaga	Spain	x	63.51	63.28	60.67	62.77	x	63.51	
9	Victor Vernède	France	x	x	62.50				62.50	

== Women's results ==
=== 100 metres ===
Heats – 27 June
Wind:
Heat 1: -1.1 m/s, Heat 2: -1.5 m/s

Rank	Heat	Name	Nationality	Time	Notes
1	2	Orlann Ombissa-Dzangue	France	11.43	Q
2	1	Rafailia Spanoudaki-Hatziriga	Greece	11.56	Q
3	1	Anna Bongiorni	Italy	11.60	Q
4	1	Stella Akakpo	France	11.64	Q
5	2	Johanelis Herrera Abreu	Italy	11.69	Q
6	2	Cristina Lara	Spain	11.72	Q
7	2	Olivia Fotopoulou	Cyprus	11.76	q
8	1	María Isabel Pérez	Spain	11.80	q
9	2	Zorana Barjaktarović	Serbia	12.06	
10	1	Dimitra Kyriakidou	Cyprus	12.31	
11	2	Charlotte Afriat	Monaco	12.70	
	1	Lorène Bazolo	Portugal	DNS	

Final – 28 June
Wind:
-0.5 m/s

Rank	Lane	Name	Nationality	Time	Notes
1st place, gold medalist(s)	3	Orlann Ombissa-Dzangue	France	11.29	
2nd place, silver medalist(s)	4	Rafailia Spanoudaki-Hatziriga	Greece	11.53	
3rd place, bronze medalist(s)	5	Anna Bongiorni	Italy	11.53	
4	2	Olivia Fotopoulou	Cyprus	11.59	SB
5	7	Stella Akakpo	France	11.61	
6	8	Cristina Lara	Spain	11.65	
7	1	María Isabel Pérez	Spain	11.69	
8	6	Johanelis Herrera Abreu	Italy	11.72	

=== 200 metres ===
Heats – 27 June
Wind:
Heat 1: -0.4 m/s, Heat 2: +1.4 m/s

Rank	Heat	Name	Nationality	Time	Notes
1	1	Carolle Zahi	France	23.09	Q, PB
2	2	Gloria Hooper	Italy	23.12	Q, SB
3	2	Estela García	Spain	23.22	Q
4	1	Irene Siragusa	Italy	23.23	Q
5	2	Basant Hemida	Egypt	23.52	Q, PB
6	2	Estelle Raffai	France	23.54	q
7	1	Paula Sevilla	Spain	23.61	Q, PB
8	1	Grigoria-Emmanouela Keramida	Greece	23.79	q, SB
9	2	Zorana Barjaktarović	Serbia	24.04	
10	1	Assia Raziki	Morocco	24.21	
11	1	Filipa Martins	Portugal	24.70	SB
12	2	Khadija Ouardi	Morocco	1:52.05	
	2	Lorène Bazolo	Portugal	DNS	

Final – 28 June
Wind:
+0.5 m/s

Rank	Lane	Name	Nationality	Time	Notes
1st place, gold medalist(s)	3	Carolle Zahi	France	23.02	PB
2nd place, silver medalist(s)	4	Gloria Hooper	Italy	23.09	SB
3rd place, bronze medalist(s)	5	Estela García	Spain	23.11	PB
4	6	Irene Siragusa	Italy	23.11	
5	8	Paula Sevilla	Spain	23.34	PB
6	7	Basant Hemida	Egypt	23.47	PB
7	2	Estelle Raffai	France	23.51	
8	1	Grigoria-Emmanouela Keramida	Greece	23.90	SB

=== 400 metres ===
Heats – 27 June

Rank	Heat	Name	Nationality	Time	Notes
1	1	Eleni Artymata	Cyprus	51.76	Q, SB
2	1	Maria Benedicta Chigbolu	Italy	52.08	Q, SB
3	1	Déborah Sananes	France	52.11	Q, PB
4	1	Cátia Azevedo	Portugal	52.36	q
5	2	Libania Grenot	Italy	52.90	Q
6	2	Irini Vasiliou	Greece	53.07	Q, SB
7	2	Khadija Ouardi	Morocco	53.08	Q
8	2	Elea-Mariama Diarra	France	53.15	q
9	2	Laura Bueno	Spain	53.15	
10	1	Herminia Parra	Spain	53.63	PB
11	1	Anna Vasiliou	Greece	53.65	
12	2	Rivinilda Mentai	Portugal	53.95	
13	2	Kalliopi Kountouri	Cyprus	55.02	
14	1	Vijona Kryeziu	Kosovo	56.03	SB
	1	Assia Raziki	Morocco	DNS	

Final – 28 June

Rank	Lane	Name	Nationality	Time	Notes
1st place, gold medalist(s)	4	Eleni Artymata	Cyprus	51.19	PB
2nd place, silver medalist(s)	3	Libania Grenot	Italy	51.32	SB
3rd place, bronze medalist(s)	5	Maria Benedicta Chigbolu	Italy	52.14	SB
4	7	Déborah Sananes	France	52.26	SB
5	2	Cátia Azevedo	Portugal	52.63	
6	1	Elea-Mariama Diarra	France	52.75	
7	6	Irini Vasiliou	Greece	53.20	SB
	8	Khadija Ouardi	Morocco	DQ	R163.3

=== 800 metres ===
Heats – 27 June

Rank	Heat	Name	Nationality	Time	Notes
1	1	Cynthia Anaïs	France	2:02.72	Q
2	2	Rababe Arafi	Morocco	2:03.45	Q
3	2	Yusneysi Santiusti	Italy	2:03.61	Q, SB
4	2	Esther Guerrero	Spain	2:03.93	Q
5	2	Leila Boufaarirane	France	2:04.50	q
6	1	Malika Akkaoui	Morocco	2:04.54	Q
7	1	Konstantina Giannopoulou	Greece	2:04.99	Q, SB
8	1	Natalia Evangelidou	Cyprus	2:06.16	q
9	2	Amela Terzić	Serbia	2:08.38	SB
10	2	Gresa Bakraçi	Kosovo	2:13.41	
11	2	Relaksa Dauti	Albania	2:16.21	
	1	Meryem Akda	Turkey	DNS	
	1	Haifa Tarchoun	Tunisia	DNS	

Final – 29 June

Rank	Name	Nationality	Time	Notes
1st place, gold medalist(s)	Rababe Arafi	Morocco	2:01.01	
2nd place, silver medalist(s)	Malika Akkaoui	Morocco	2:01.50	
3rd place, bronze medalist(s)	Cynthia Anaïs	France	2:02.33	
4	Esther Guerrero	Spain	2:03.35	
5	Yusneysi Santiusti	Italy	2:04.24	
6	Leila Boufaarirane	France	2:05.97	
7	Natalia Evangelidou	Cyprus	2:06.28	
8	Konstantina Giannopoulou	Greece	2:12.72	

=== 1500 metres ===
30 June

Rank	Name	Nationality	Time	Notes
1st place, gold medalist(s)	Rababe Arafi	Morocco	4:12.83	
2nd place, silver medalist(s)	Malika Akkaoui	Morocco	4:13.31	
3rd place, bronze medalist(s)	Marta Pérez	Spain	4:15.66	
4	Solange Pereira	Spain	4:15.97	
5	Meryem Akda	Turkey	4:19.04	
6	Élodie Normand	France	4:19.05	
7	Amela Terzić	Serbia	4:19.13	
8	Ophélie Claude-Boxberger	France	4:19.49	
9	Natalia Evangelidou	Cyprus	4:21.23	
10	Koraini Kyriakopoulou	Greece	4:26.15	
11	Athina Koini	Greece	4:30.65	
	Luiza Gega	Albania	DNS	
	Haifa Tarchoun	Tunisia	DNS	

=== 5000 metres ===
29 June

Rank	Name	Nationality	Time	Notes
1st place, gold medalist(s)	Kaoutar Farkoussi	Morocco	15:52.33	PB
2nd place, silver medalist(s)	Inês Monteiro	Portugal	15:54.78	SB
3rd place, bronze medalist(s)	Ana Lozano	Spain	16:00.17	
4	Liv Westphal	France	16:05.19	
5	Soukaina Atanane	Morocco	16:12.80	
6	Marie Bouchard	France	16:24.08	
7	Anastasia Karakatsani	Greece	16:57.87	PB
8	Meropi Panagiotou	Cyprus	17:05.56	

=== Half marathon ===
30 June

Rank	Name	Nationality	Time	Notes
1st place, gold medalist(s)	Sara Dossena	Italy	1:13:48	
2nd place, silver medalist(s)	Marta Galimany	Spain	1:15:16	
3rd place, bronze medalist(s)	Elena Loyo	Spain	1:16:20	
4	Elvan Abeylegesse	Turkey	1:18:47	
5	Chirine Njeim	Lebanon	1:19:08	
6	Fadouwa Ledhem	France	1:19:53	
7	Tubay Erdal	Turkey	1:20:58	
8	Eleftheria Petroulaki	Greece	1:21:59	
9	Lisa Marie Bezzina	Malta	1:24:35	
	Hajiba Hasnaoui	Morocco	DNF	
	Büşra Nur Koku	Turkey	DNF	
	Slađana Perunović	Montenegro	DNF	
	Samira Mezeghrane-Saad	France	DNF	
	Somaya Bousaid	Tunisia	DNS	

=== 100 metres hurdles ===
Heats – 27 June
Wind:
Heat 1: -2.3 m/s, Heat 2: -2.9 m/s

Rank	Heat	Name	Nationality	Time	Notes
1	1	Luminosa Bogliolo	Italy	13.17	Q
2	1	Andrea Ivančević	Croatia	13.26	Q, SB
3	2	Elisavet Pesiridou	Greece	13.41	Q
4	1	Laura Valette	France	13.56	Q
5	1	Natalia Christofi	Cyprus	13.57	q, SB
6	2	Fanny Quenot	France	13.62	Q
7	2	Ivana Lončarek	Croatia	13.66	Q
8	1	Caridad Jerez	Spain	13.72	q
9	2	Teresa Errandonea	Spain	13.75	
10	1	Nika Glojnarič	Slovenia	13.95	
11	2	Dimitra Arachoviti	Cyprus	14.09	
12	2	Lina Ahmed	Egypt	14.20	

Final – 29 June
Wind:
-0.9 m/s

Rank	Lane	Name	Nationality	Time	Notes
1st place, gold medalist(s)	5	Andrea Ivančević	Croatia	13.19	SB
2nd place, silver medalist(s)	3	Luminosa Bogliolo	Italy	13.30	
2nd place, silver medalist(s)	4	Elisavet Pesiridou	Greece	13.30	
4	8	Ivana Lončarek	Croatia	13.40	
5	1	Caridad Jerez	Spain	13.40	
6	6	Fanny Quenot	France	13.52	
7	2	Natalia Christofi	Cyprus	13.63	
8	7	Laura Valette	France	13.94	

=== 400 metres hurdles ===
Heats – 27 June

Rank	Heat	Name	Nationality	Time	Notes
1	2	Ayomide Folorunso	Italy	56.74	Q
2	2	Aurélie Chaboudez	France	57.27	Q, PB
3	1	Yadisleidy Pedroso	Italy	57.38	Q
4	1	Anaïs Lufutucu	France	58.43	Q
5	2	Elif Gören	Turkey	58.76	Q
6	1	Andreia Crespo	Portugal	58.82	Q, SB
7	2	Effrosyni Theodorou	Greece	59.66	q
8	1	Elpida Toka	Greece	59.69	q
9	2	Drita Isljami	Macedonia	1:00.68	SB
10	1	Christiana Katsari	Cyprus	1:05.25	
	1	Agata Zupin	Slovenia	DNS	

Final – 30 June

Rank	Lane	Name	Nationality	Time	Notes
1st place, gold medalist(s)	3	Yadisleidy Pedroso	Italy	55.40	SB
2nd place, silver medalist(s)	4	Ayomide Folorunso	Italy	55.44	
3rd place, bronze medalist(s)	5	Aurélie Chaboudez	France	56.77	PB
4	7	Elif Gören	Turkey	57.66	
5	5	Andreia Crespo	Portugal	58.31	SB
6	6	Anaïs Lufutucu	France	58.41	
7	2	Effrosyni Theodorou	Greece	59.02	SB
8	1	Elpida Toka	Greece	59.28	SB

=== 3000 metres steeplechase ===
28 June

Rank	Name	Nationality	Time	Notes
1st place, gold medalist(s)	Luiza Gega	Albania	9:27.73	
2nd place, silver medalist(s)	Habiba Ghribi	Tunisia	9:34.62	
3rd place, bronze medalist(s)	Maruša Mišmaš	Slovenia	9:35.57	SB
4	Irene Sánchez-Escribano	Spain	9:37.86	PB
5	Özlem Kaya	Turkey	9:39.43	SB
6	Fadwa Sidi Madane	Morocco	9:46.67	
7	Rima Chenah	Algeria	9:53.24	
8	Francesca Bertoni	Italy	9:56.21	SB
9	Oumaima Saoud	Morocco	9:57.66	
10	Emma Oudiou	France	9:58.08	
11	Teresa Urbina	Spain	10:06.26	

=== 4 × 100 metres relay ===
30 June

Rank	Lane	Nation	Competitors	Time	Notes
1st place, gold medalist(s)	5	France	Orlann Ombissa-Dzangue, Jennifer Galais, Estelle Raffai, Carolle Zahi	43.29	
2nd place, silver medalist(s)	6	Spain	María Isabel Pérez, Estela García, Paula Sevilla, Cristina Lara	43.31	NR
3rd place, bronze medalist(s)	3	Italy	Gloria Hooper, Irene Siragusa, Anna Bongiorni, Johanelis Herrera Abreu	43.63	
4	4	Cyprus	Dimitra Kyriakidou, Olivia Fotopoulou, Filippa Fotopoulou, Eleni Artymata	44.72	
5	7	Greece	Kiriaki Samani, Grigoria Keramida, Rafailía Spanoudaki-Hatziriga, Ekaterini Sarri	45.11	

=== 4 × 400 metres relay ===
30 June

Rank	Nation	Competitors	Time	Notes
1st place, gold medalist(s)	Italy	Maria Benedicta Chigbolu, Ayomide Folorunso, Raphaela Lukudo, Libania Grenot	3:28.08	GR
2nd place, silver medalist(s)	France	Amandine Brossier, Agnès Raharolahy, Cynthia Anaïs, Elea-Mariama Diarra	3:29.76	
3rd place, bronze medalist(s)	Spain	Laura Bueno, Herminia Parra, Carmen Sánchez, Aauri Bokesa	3:31.54	
4	Morocco	Assia Raziki, Malika Akkaoui, Khadija Ouardi, Rababe Arafi	3:33.91	
5	Portugal	Andreia Crespo, Cátia Azevedo, Filipa Martins, Rivinilda Mentai	3:34.21	
	Cyprus		DNS	

=== Pole vault ===
28 June

Rank	Name	Nationality	3.71	3.91	4.01	4.11	4.21	4.31	4.36	4.41	4.46	4.51	4.56	Result	Notes
1st place, gold medalist(s)	Ninon Guillon-Romarin	France	–	–	–	–	–	–	xo	–	xo	–	xxx	4.46	
2nd place, silver medalist(s)	Tina Šutej	Slovenia	–	–	–	o	xxo	o	o	xo	xx–	x		4.41	
3rd place, bronze medalist(s)	Nikoleta Kyriakopoulou	Greece	–	–	–	–	–	o	–	xx–	x			4.31	
4	Mónica Clemente	Spain	–	o	–	o	o	xxx						4.21	
5	Buse Arıkazan	Turkey	–	–	xo	–	xxo	–	xxx					4.21	
6	Dorra Mahfoudhi	Tunisia	o	o	o	o	xxx							4.11	
7	Marta Onofre	Portugal	–	–	–	xo	xxx							4.11	
7	Maria Leonor Tavares	Portugal	–	–	o	xo	xxx							4.11	
9	Demet Parlak	Turkey	–	–	o	–	xxx							4.01	
10	Maialen Axpe	Spain	–	xo	o	xxx								4.01	
11	Maria Aristotelous	Cyprus	o	o	xxo	xx–								4.01	
12	Dina Eltabaa	Egypt	xo	xxo	xxx									3.91	
	Marion Lotout	France	–	–	–	–	xxx							NM	

=== Long jump ===
27 June

Rank	Name	Nationality	#1	#2	#3	#4	#5	#6	Result	Notes
1st place, gold medalist(s)	Ivana Španović	Serbia	7.04w	6.99	6.95	6.79	x	–	7.04w	GR
2nd place, silver medalist(s)	Juliet Itoya	Spain	x	6.50w	6.68w	6.43	x	6.83w	6.83w	
3rd place, bronze medalist(s)	Fatima Diame	Spain	6.53	x	6.68	x	x	x	6.68	PB
4	Nektaria Panayi	Cyprus	6.47	6.39w	6.30	6.41	6.56	6.61	6.61	
5	Evelise Veiga	Portugal	6.25w	6.55	6.54	6.20	x	6.61	6.61	PB
6	Laura Strati	Italy	x	6.51	x	5.00	x	x	6.51	
7	Karin Melis Mey	Turkey	6.26	6.44	6.33	6.40	6.08	6.23	6.44	
8	Chaido Alexouli	Greece	6.08	6.30w	x	6.39	x	6.17	6.39	
9	Rougui Sow	France	x	6.29	6.29				6.29	
10	Tania Vicenzino	Italy	6.25	6.28	5.94				6.28	
11	Yanis Esmeralda David	France	6.26w	x	6.24				6.26w	
12	Filippa Fotopoulou	Cyprus	x	5.86w	5.78				5.86w	

=== Triple jump ===
29 June

Rank	Name	Nationality	#1	#2	#3	#4	#5	#6	Result	Notes
1st place, gold medalist(s)	Yanis Esmeralda David	France	13.38	14.14	13.93	14.15	14.09	13.91	14.15	PB
2nd place, silver medalist(s)	Ottavia Cestonaro	Italy	13.69	x	x	13.60	13.90	14.05	14.05	PB
3rd place, bronze medalist(s)	Fatima Diame	Spain	x	13.32	13.92	x	x	x	13.92	
4	Patricia Sarrapio	Spain	13.45	13.85	x	x	13.63	13.82	13.85	
5	Susana Costa	Portugal	13.81	13.69	13.75	x	13.58	13.81	13.81	SB
6	Patrícia Mamona	Portugal	13.55	x	13.79	x	13.55	13.76	13.79	SB
7	Marie-Josée Ebwea Bile	France	13.42	13.49	x	x	13.36	x	13.49	
8	Dariya Derkach	Italy	13.21	x	x	13.16	13.39	13.02	13.39	
9	Kristina Alvertsian	Greece	x	x	12.69				12.69	

=== Discus throw ===
28 June

Rank	Name	Nationality	#1	#2	#3	#4	#5	#6	Result	Notes
1st place, gold medalist(s)	Sandra Perković	Croatia	66.46	x	x	x	x	x	66.46	GR
2nd place, silver medalist(s)	Liliana Cá	Portugal	x	58.08	60.05	59.31	x	x	60.05	
3rd place, bronze medalist(s)	Chrysoula Anagnostopoulou	Greece	55.45	57.24	58.85	58.53	57.22	58.45	58.85	
4	Irina Rodrigues	Portugal	54.72	54.77	57.71	x	55.62	x	57.71	
5	Sabina Asenjo	Spain	51.64	56.12	56.43	56.09	57.41	x	57.41	SB
6	Valentina Aniballi	Italy	56.10	56.10	57.15	55.93	55.65	56.87	57.15	
7	Veronika Domjan	Slovenia	55.04	56.26	55.40	x	x	x	56.26	
8	Kristina Rakočević	Montenegro	47.77	56.20	53.08	56.07	x	54.95	56.20	SB
9	Melanie Pingeon	France	53.50	x	53.80				53.80	
10	Irène Donzelot	France	48.75	50.18	52.82				52.82	
11	Daisy Osakue	Italy	x	51.49	x				51.49	
12	Androniki Lada	Cyprus	50.46	x	48.97				50.46	
13	Amira Sayed	Egypt	47.92	45.34	49.17				49.17	

=== Hammer throw ===
28 June

Rank	Name	Nationality	#1	#2	#3	#4	#5	#6	Result	Notes
1st place, gold medalist(s)	Alexandra Tavernier	France	73.67	x	x	x	x	x	73.67	GR
2nd place, silver medalist(s)	Kıvılcım Kaya Salman	Turkey	70.83	71.07	70.12	69.68	69.76	x	71.07	
3rd place, bronze medalist(s)	Camille Sainte-Luce	France	66.72	68.93	64.47	66.36	66.06	69.60	69.60	
4	Berta Castells	Spain	67.53	x	64.60	x	65.24	66.17	67.53	
5	Laura Redondo	Spain	63.89	60.65	63.06	x	60.52	62.10	63.89	
6	Tuğçe Şahutoğlu	Turkey	61.18	x	x	63.58	x	63.39	63.58	
7	Soukaina Zakkour	Morocco	x	60.22	x	60.47	60.78	58.05	60.78	
8	Ekaterini Vamvoukaki	Greece	57.81	60.62	59.81	x	59.02	x	60.62	
9	Chrystalla Kyriakou	Cyprus	x	56.80	58.82				58.82	
