= 2015 World Championships in Athletics – Men's 400 metres hurdles =

Men's 400 metres hurdles at the 2015 World Championships
- Venue: Beijing National Stadium
- Dates: 22 August (heats); 23 August (semifinals); 25 August (final)
- Competitors: 41 from 26 nations
- Winning time: 47.79

Medalists
gold medal	Nicholas Bett	Kenya
silver medal	Denis Kudryavtsev	Russia
bronze medal	Jeffery Gibson	Bahamas

The men's 400 metres hurdles at the 2015 World Championships in Athletics was held at the Beijing National Stadium on 22, 23 and 25 August.

== Summary ==
While Kenya has dominated the longest hurdle race, the 3000 metres steeplechase since the 1968 Olympics, and John Akii-Bua from neighboring Uganda hinted at what might be the capability of East African athletes in this event, Kenya has never had a medalist at 400 hurdles, until this year. Nicholas Bett was the fastest qualifier in the heats. His teammate Boniface Tumuti was the second fastest in the semi-finals, while Bett struggled into the slowest qualifier into the finals. That put Bett almost unnoticed in the far outside lane. Michael Tinsley was the only returning medalist from recent history and the rest of the world leaders were already eliminated, making for a very open race. The fastest 5 finalists all ran their personal best just to make the final race.

Tinsley was the early leader out of the blocks, but was quickly overtaken by Denis Kudryavtsev down the backstretch. Through the turn Tinsley began to hit hurdles, Kudryavtsev the clear leader coming to the straightaway. A couple of meters behind was a wall of Tinsley, Jeffery Gibson and Kerron Clement, with Bett slightly behind them. Kudryavtsev stretched for the ninth hurdle, Tinsley hit it and Bett stormed past. Reminiscent of Kenyan steeplechase finishes, he took the final barrier somewhat awkwardly but continued with so much power that the rest of the field was left behind him. Kudryavtsev held on for silver with a Russian national record. Gibson won the race to the line for bronze, setting his second Bahamian national record of the competition. The once dominant American team, shut out, while Kenya wins its first medal in the event and it was gold.

== Records ==
Prior to the competition, the records were as follows:

World record	Kevin Young (USA)	46.78	Barcelona, Spain	6 August 1992
Championship record	Kevin Young (USA)	47.18	Stuttgart, Germany	19 August 1993
World Leading	Bershawn Jackson (USA)	48.09	Doha, Qatar	15 May 2015
African Record	Samuel Matete (ZAM)	47.10	Zurich, Switzerland	7 August 1991
Asian Record	Hadi Soua'an Al-Somaily (KSA)	47.53	Sydney, Australia	27 September 2000
North, Central American and Caribbean record	Kevin Young (USA)	46.78	Barcelona, Spain	6 August 1992
South American Record	Bayano Kamani (PAN)	47.84	Helsinki, Finland	7 August 2005
European Record	Stéphane Diagana (FRA)	47.37	Lausanne, Switzerland	5 July 1995
Oceanian record	Rohan Robinson (AUS)	48.28	Atlanta, GA, United States	31 July 1996

== Qualification standards ==
Entry standards
49.50

== Schedule ==
Date	Time	Round
22 August 2015	18:35	Heats
23 August 2015	18:40	Semifinals
25 August 2015	20:25	Final

All times are local times (UTC+8)

== Results ==
KEY:	q	Fastest non-qualifiers	Q	Qualified	NR	National record	PB	Personal best	SB	Seasonal best

=== Heats ===
Qualification: Best 4 (Q) and next 4 fastest (q) qualify for the next round.

Rank	Heat	Name	Nationality	Time	Notes
1	1	Nicholas Bett	Kenya	48.37	Q
2	5	Denis Kudryavtsev	Russia	48.51	Q, PB
3	3	Kerron Clement	United States	48.75	Q
4	2	Boniface Tumuti	Kenya	48.79	Q, PB
5	4	Yasmani Copello	Turkey	48.89	Q, NR
6	3	Niall Flannery	Great Britain & N.I.	48.90	Q, SB
7	2	Michael Tinsley	United States	48.91	Q
8	5	Patryk Dobek	Poland	48.94	Q
9	5	Johnny Dutch	United States	48.97	Q
10	2	Javier Culson	Puerto Rico	49.02	Q
11	1	Timofey Chalyy	Russia	49.05	Q, SB
12	3	Kariem Hussein	Switzerland	49.08	Q
13	1	Jeffery Gibson	Bahamas	49.09	Q
14	3	Annsert Whyte	Jamaica	49.10	Q
15	2	L. J. van Zyl	South Africa	49.12	Q
16	1	Kurt Couto	Mozambique	49.15	Q, SB
17	4	Rasmus Mägi	Estonia	49.18	Q
18	4	Thomas Barr	Ireland	49.20	Q
19	1	Abdelmalik Lahoulou	Algeria	49.33	q
19	2	Leford Green	Jamaica	49.33	q
21	5	Yuki Matsushita	Japan	49.34	Q
22	5	Haron Koech	Kenya	49.38	q, PB
22	5	Michaël Bultheel	Belgium	49.38	q
22	3	Miles Ukaoma	Nigeria	49.38	
25	1	Roxroy Cato	Jamaica	49.47	
26	4	Cheng Wen	China	49.56	Q, PB
26	4	Ivan Shablyuyev	Russia	49.56	
28	1	Michael Cochrane	New Zealand	49.58	NR
28	2	Yuta Konishi	Japan	49.58	SB
30	1	Takayuki Kishimoto	Japan	49.78	
31	2	Jehue Gordon	Trinidad and Tobago	49.91	
32	1	Eric Alejandro	Puerto Rico	49.94	
33	4	Eric Cray	Philippines	50.04	
34	4	Bershawn Jackson	United States	50.14	
35	5	Miloud Rahmani	Algeria	50.21	
36	5	Jaak-Heinrich Jagor	Estonia	50.29	
37	4	Johannes Maritz	Namibia	51.10	
38	3	Saber Boukemouche	Algeria	51.54	
39	5	Amadou Ndiaye	Senegal	52.40	
40	2	Maoulida Darouèche	Comoros	53.06	
	3	Mohamed Sghaier	Tunisia	DQ	R163.3(a)
	2	Andrés Silva	Uruguay	DNS	
	3	Cornel Fredericks	South Africa	DNS	
	4	Jack Green	Great Britain & N.I.	DNS	

=== Semifinals ===
Qualification: First 2 in each heat (Q) and the next 2 fastest (q) advanced to the final.

Rank	Heat	Name	Nationality	Time	Notes
1	2	Denis Kudryavtsev	Russia	48.23	Q, PB
2	1	Boniface Tumuti	Kenya	48.29	Q, PB
3	2	Jeffery Gibson	Bahamas	48.37	Q, NR
4	2	Patryk Dobek	Poland	48.40	q, PB
5	2	Yasmani Copello	Turkey	48.46	q, NR
6	3	Michael Tinsley	United States	48.47	Q
7	1	Kerron Clement	United States	48.50	Q
8	3	Nicholas Bett	Kenya	48.54	Q
9	3	Kariem Hussein	Switzerland	48.59	
10	1	Timofey Chalyy	Russia	48.69	PB
11	1	Thomas Barr	Ireland	48.71	
12	2	Johnny Dutch	United States	48.74	
13	1	Rasmus Mägi	Estonia	48.76	
14	1	Abdelmalik Lahoulou	Algeria	48.87	NR
15	2	L. J. van Zyl	South Africa	48.89	
16	1	Annsert Whyte	Jamaica	48.90	SB
17	3	Niall Flannery	Great Britain & N.I.	49.17	
18	3	Javier Culson	Puerto Rico	49.36	
19	2	Haron Koech	Kenya	49.54	
20	3	Leford Green	Jamaica	49.59	
21	2	Cheng Wen	China	49.62	
22	1	Michaël Bultheel	Belgium	49.66	
23	3	Kurt Couto	Mozambique	50.58	
24	3	Yuki Matsushita	Japan	51.10	

=== Final ===
The final was started at 21:15.

Rank	Lane	Name	Nationality	Time	Notes
1st place, gold medalist(s)	9	Nicholas Bett	Kenya	47.79	WL, NR
2nd place, silver medalist(s)	6	Denis Kudryavtsev	Russia	48.05	NR
3rd place, bronze medalist(s)	7	Jeffery Gibson	Bahamas	48.17	NR
4	8	Kerron Clement	United States	48.18	SB
5	4	Boniface Tumuti	Kenya	48.33	
6	2	Yasmani Copello	Turkey	48.96	
7	3	Patryk Dobek	Poland	49.14	
8	5	Michael Tinsley	United States	50.02	
