= Athletics at the 2017 Summer Universiade – Men's 400 metres hurdles =

The men's 400 metres hurdles event at the 2017 Summer Universiade was held on 24, 25 and 26 August at the Taipei Municipal Stadium.

== Medalists ==
Gold	Silver	Bronze
Juander Santos; Dominican Republic	Chen Chieh; Chinese Taipei	Abdelmalik Lahoulou; Algeria

== Results ==
=== Heats ===
Qualification: First 3 in each heat (Q) and next 6 fastest (q) qualified for the semifinals.

Rank	Heat	Name	Nationality	Time	Notes
1	3	Chen Chieh	Chinese Taipei	49.82	Q
2	1	Patryk Dobek	Poland	50.14	Q
3	6	Johanneslodewic Pretorius	South Africa	50.28	Q
4	6	Juander Santos	Dominican Republic	50.37	Q
5	3	José Reynaldo Bencosme de Leon	Italy	50.45	Q
6	6	Dmitriy Koblov	Kazakhstan	50.61	Q, SB
7	5	Johannes Maritz	Namibia	50.66	Q
8	6	Artur Terezan	Brazil	50.69	q
9	3	Alain-Hervé Mfomkpa	Switzerland	50.76	Q, PB
10	2	Dany Brand	Switzerland	50.78	Q
11	1	Abdelmalik Lahoulou	Algeria	50.80	Q
12	2	Guillermo Ruggeri	Argentina	50.91	Q
13	5	Oskari Mörö	Finland	50.93	Q
14	1	Vít Müller	Czech Republic	50.95	Q
15	1	Jesper Arts	Netherlands	50.99	q, SB
16	3	Paul Byrne	Ireland	51.06	q
17	6	Alfredo Sepúlveda	Chile	51.08	q
18	5	Jaak-Heinrich Jagor	Estonia	51.24	Q
18	1	Dominik Hufnagl	Austria	51.24	q
20	4	Jacob Paul	Great Britain	51.38	Q
21	2	Yu Chia-hsuan	Chinese Taipei	51.46	Q
22	5	Le Roux Hamman	South Africa	51.60	q
23	4	Ryo Kajiki	Japan	51.73	Q
24	4	Saber Boukmouche	Algeria	51.88	Q
25	4	Jaime Rodríguez	Argentina	52.10	
26	5	Gerald Drummond	Costa Rica	52.22	
27	4	Martin Juránek	Czech Republic	52.28	
28	6	Hwang Hyeonu	South Korea	52.37	
29	5	Jakub Bottlík	Slovakia	52.57	
30	3	Igor Kondratyev	Kazakhstan	53.48	
31	2	Peter Hribaršek	Slovenia	53.59	
32	4	Jan Jamnik	Slovenia	53.81	
33	5	Connor Henderson	Philippines	54.42	
34	1	Ishan Lahiru Olidurage	Sri Lanka	54.87	
35	3	Martin Brueckner Johansen	Denmark	55.76	
36	6	Mohammed Taleb Al-Shalati	Saudi Arabia	56.24	
37	2	Ragheb Raad	Lebanon	1:04.12	
	2	Gregory MacNeill	Canada	DQ	R168.7a

=== Semifinals ===
Qualification: First 2 in each heat (Q) and the next 2 fastest (q) qualified for the final.

Rank	Heat	Name	Nationality	Time	Notes
1	3	Juander Santos	Dominican Republic	49.31	Q
2	3	Chen Chieh	Chinese Taipei	49.37	Q, SB
3	2	Jaak-Heinrich Jagor	Estonia	49.55	Q
4	2	Abdelmalik Lahoulou	Algeria	49.62	Q
5	2	Johanneslodewic Pretorius	South Africa	49.69	q
6	1	Patryk Dobek	Poland	49.77	Q, SB
7	1	José Reynaldo Bencosme de Leon	Italy	50.01	Q
8	1	Dany Brand	Switzerland	50.06	q
9	3	Jacob Paul	Great Britain	50.37	
10	2	Guillermo Ruggeri	Argentina	50.54	
11	2	Johannes Maritz	Namibia	50.59	
12	3	Dmitriy Koblov	Kazakhstan	50.84	
13	2	Alain-Hervé Mfomkpa	Switzerland	50.97	
14	3	Ryo Kajiki	Japan	50.99	
15	1	Oskari Mörö	Finland	51.04	
16	3	Le Roux Hamman	South Africa	51.18	
17	2	Paul Byrne	Ireland	51.31	
18	1	Vít Müller	Czech Republic	51.46	
19	3	Saber Boukmouche	Algeria	51.63	
20	3	Artur Terezan	Brazil	51.89	
21	2	Alfredo Sepúlveda	Chile	52.26	
22	1	Dominik Hufnagl	Austria	52.29	
23	1	Yu Chia-hsuan	Chinese Taipei	52.43	
24	1	Jesper Arts	Netherlands	52.94	

=== Final ===
Official Video

Rank	Lane	Name	Nationality	Time	Notes
1st place, gold medalist(s)	3	Juander Santos	Dominican Republic	48.65	
2nd place, silver medalist(s)	4	Chen Chieh	Chinese Taipei	49.05	=PB
3rd place, bronze medalist(s)	8	Abdelmalik Lahoulou	Algeria	49.30	
4	7	José Reynaldo Bencosme de Leon	Italy	49.38	
5	5	Patryk Dobek	Poland	49.51	SB
6	2	Johanneslodewic Pretorius	South Africa	49.71	
7	1	Dany Brand	Switzerland	49.92	
8	6	Jaak-Heinrich Jagor	Estonia	50.71	
