= 2018 African Championships in Athletics – Men's 400 metres hurdles =

The men's 400 metres hurdles event at the 2018 African Championships in Athletics was held on 2 and 3 August in Asaba, Nigeria.

== Medalists ==
Gold	Silver	Bronze
Abdelmalik Lahoulou; Algeria	Cornel Fredericks; South Africa	Zied Azizi; Tunisia

== Results ==
=== Heats ===
Qualification: First 3 of each heat (Q) and the next 2 fastest (q) qualified for the final.

Rank	Heat	Name	Nationality	Time	Notes
1	1	Aron Koech	Kenya	49.77	Q
2	2	Cornel Fredericks	South Africa	49.84	Q
3	2	Nicholas Bett	Kenya	49.88	Q
4	2	Abdelmalik Lahoulou	Algeria	50.22	Q
5	2	William Mbevi Mutunga	Kenya	50.31	q
6	1	Zied Azizi	Tunisia	50.59	Q
7	1	Le Roux Hamman	South Africa	50.68	Q
8	1	Saber Boukemouche	Algeria	51.00	q
9	2	Henry Okorie	Nigeria	51.51	
10	1	Johannes Maritz	Namibia	51.60	
11	1	Rilwan Alowonle	Nigeria	51.97	
12	2	Ned Azemia	Seychelles	52.01	
13	2	Jordin Andrade	Cape Verde	52.28	
14	2	Gadisa Bayu	Ethiopia	52.40	
15	1	Abu Elsid Yasir Ahmed	Sudan	53.31	
	2	Kurt Couto	Mozambique	DNF	
	1	Bienvenu Sawadogo	Burkina Faso	DNS	

=== Final ===
Rank	Lane	Athlete	Nationality	Time	Notes
1st place, gold medalist(s)	7	Abdelmalik Lahoulou	Algeria	48.47	NR
2nd place, silver medalist(s)	3	Cornel Fredericks	South Africa	49.40	
3rd place, bronze medalist(s)	4	Zied Azizi	Tunisia	49.48	
4	5	Aron Koech	Kenya	49.94	
5	8	Le Roux Hamman	South Africa	50.53	
6	1	William Mbevi Mutunga	Kenya	52.61	
	2	Nicholas Bett	Kenya	DNF	
	6	Saber Boukemouche	Algeria	DNS	
