= 2014 African Championships in Athletics – Men's 400 metres hurdles =

The men's 400 metres hurdles event at the 2014 African Championships in Athletics was held August 11–12 on Stade de Marrakech.

== Medalists ==
Gold	Silver	Bronze
Cornel Fredericks; South Africa	Cristian Morton; Nigeria	Nicholas Bett; Kenya

== Results ==
=== Heats ===
Qualification: First 2 of each heat (Q) and the next 2 fastest (q) qualified for the final.

Rank	Heat	Name	Nationality	Time	Notes
1	2	Nicholas Bett	Kenya	49.33	Q
2	2	Cristian Morton	Nigeria	49.84	Q
3	3	Cornel Fredericks	South Africa	50.15	Q
4	2	L. J. van Zyl	South Africa	50.31	q
5	1	Miles Ukaoma	Nigeria	50.32	Q
6	1	Mohamed Sghaier	Tunisia	50.62	Q
7	1	Saber Boukemouche	Algeria	50.64	q
8	3	Johannes Maritz	Namibia	50.95	Q
9	3	Amadou Ndiaye	Senegal	50.96	
10	2	Abdelmalik Lahoulou	Algeria	51.67	
11	3	Zied Azizi	Tunisia	51.76	
12	2	Abdelhadi Messaoudi	Morocco	52.16	
13	1	Antonio Vieillesse	Mauritius	52.35	
14	1	Soufiane Messaoudi	Morocco	52.60	
15	2	Mezm Hailemariam	Ethiopia	53.26	
16	2	Ned Azemia	Seychelles	55.72	
17	3	Aymar Oboba Fleury	Republic of the Congo	57.23	
	1	Maoulida Darouèche	Comoros	DQ	R168.7a
	3	Bienvenu Sawadogo	Burkina Faso	DQ	R168.7a
	1	Boniface Mucheru	Kenya	DNS	
	3	Kurt Couto	Mozambique	DNS	

=== Final ===
Rank	Lane	Name	Nationality	Time	Notes
1st place, gold medalist(s)	5	Cornel Fredericks	South Africa	48.78	
2nd place, silver medalist(s)	4	Cristian Morton	Nigeria	48.92	
3rd place, bronze medalist(s)	6	Nicholas Bett	Kenya	49.03	
4	2	L. J. van Zyl	South Africa	49.79	
5	7	Johannes Maritz	Namibia	50.38	
6	3	Miles Ukaoma	Nigeria	50.40	
7	1	Saber Boukemouche	Algeria	50.67	
	8	Mohamed Sghaier	Tunisia	DQ	R168.7a
