= 2010 World Junior Championships in Athletics – Men's 400 metres hurdles =

The men's 400 metres hurdles event at the 2010 World Junior Championships in Athletics was held in Moncton, New Brunswick, Canada, at Moncton Stadium on 21, 22 and 23 July.

== Medalists ==
Gold	Jehue Gordon; Trinidad and Tobago
Silver	Takatoshi Abe; Japan
Bronze	Leslie Murray; U.S. Virgin Islands

== Results ==
=== Final ===
23 July

Rank	Name	Nationality	Time	Notes
1st place, gold medalist(s)	Jehue Gordon	Trinidad and Tobago	49.30	
2nd place, silver medalist(s)	Takatoshi Abe	Japan	49.46	
3rd place, bronze medalist(s)	Leslie Murray	U.S. Virgin Islands	50.22	
4	Varg Königsmark	Germany	50.47	
5	Jack Green	United Kingdom	50.49	
6	Stef Vanhaeren	Belgium	50.99	
7	Emir Bekrić	Serbia	51.06	
8	Boniface Mucheru Tumuti	Kenya	52.16	

=== Semifinals ===
22 July

==== Semifinal 1 ====
Rank	Name	Nationality	Time	Notes
1	Stef Vanhaeren	Belgium	50.91	Q
2	Leslie Murray	U.S. Virgin Islands	51.25	Q
3	Hederson Estefani	Brazil	51.59	
4	Tobias Giehl	Germany	51.77	
5	Zied Azizi	Tunisia	51.84	
6	Juan Stenner	Mexico	52.61	
7	Chen Chieh	Chinese Taipei	52.98	
8	Amadou Ndiaye	Senegal	54.40	

==== Semifinal 2 ====
Rank	Name	Nationality	Time	Notes
1	Takatoshi Abe	Japan	50.45	Q
2	Varg Königsmark	Germany	50.87	Q
3	Emir Bekrić	Serbia	50.91	q
4	João de Oliveira	Brazil	52.53	
5	Francesco Patano	Italy	52.61	
6	Michael Cochrane	New Zealand	52.71	
7	Sheroid Evans	United States	53.03	
8	Jeremiah Mutai	Kenya	55.02	

==== Semifinal 3 ====
Rank	Name	Nationality	Time	Notes
1	Jehue Gordon	Trinidad and Tobago	50.54	Q
2	Jack Green	United Kingdom	51.14	Q
3	Boniface Mucheru Tumuti	Kenya	51.22	q
4	José Bencosme De Leon	Italy	52.15	
5	Xavier Carrión	Spain	52.33	
6	Patrick Maher	Ireland	52.46	
7	Øyvind Kjerpeset	Norway	53.33	
8	Jonathan Puemi	Switzerland	53.95	

=== Heats ===
21 July

==== Heat 1 ====
Rank	Name	Nationality	Time	Notes
1	Emir Bekrić	Serbia	51.68	Q
2	Jack Green	United Kingdom	52.16	Q
3	Jeremiah Mutai	Kenya	52.53	Q
4	Le Roux Hamman	South Africa	52.66	
5	Mohamed Yousef Karam	Kuwait	54.63	
6	Javarn Gallimore	Jamaica	55.99	
7	Tim Crowe	Ireland	56.27	

==== Heat 2 ====
Rank	Name	Nationality	Time	Notes
1	Stef Vanhaeren	Belgium	51.64	Q
2	Varg Königsmark	Germany	51.78	Q
3	Xavier Carrión	Spain	51.80	Q
4	Amadou Ndiaye	Senegal	51.83	q
5	Francesco Patano	Italy	52.51	q
6	Anatoliy Synyanskyy	Ukraine	53.20	
7	Tait Nystuen	Canada	53.21	

==== Heat 3 ====
Rank	Name	Nationality	Time	Notes
1	Boniface Mucheru Tumuti	Kenya	51.46	Q
2	José Bencosme De Leon	Italy	51.86	Q
3	Michael Cochrane	New Zealand	52.25	Q
4	Tobias Giehl	Germany	52.28	q
5	Sasha Alexeenko	Australia	52.71	
6	Nolan Williams	Jamaica	54.67	
7	Damien Edouard	Mauritius	55.31	

==== Heat 4 ====
Rank	Name	Nationality	Time	Notes
1	Takatoshi Abe	Japan	50.53	Q
2	Zied Azizi	Tunisia	51.40	Q
3	Chen Chieh	Chinese Taipei	52.26	Q
4	Radek Fischer	Czech Republic	52.64	
5	Peter Marx	South Africa	52.89	
6	Abdel Malik Lahoulou	Algeria	53.00	
7	Nejmi Burnside	Bahamas	54.17	

==== Heat 5 ====
Rank	Name	Nationality	Time	Notes
1	Hederson Estefani	Brazil	52.07	Q
2	Patrick Maher	Ireland	52.46	Q
3	Øyvind Kjerpeset	Norway	52.82	Q
4	Steven White	United States	53.27	
5	Ali Al-Ghamdi	Saudi Arabia	56.04	
6	Daniel Chan	Canada	58.46	
	Stéphane Zenou-Yato	France	DNF	

==== Heat 6 ====
Rank	Name	Nationality	Time	Notes
1	Jehue Gordon	Trinidad and Tobago	51.58	Q
2	Leslie Murray	U.S. Virgin Islands	51.94	Q
3	Juan Stenner	Mexico	52.29	Q
4	Hakim Reguieg	France	52.85	
5	Juan Pablo Martínez	Dominican Republic	52.88	
6	Rasmus Mägi	Estonia	53.86	
7	Adrian Minca	Romania	56.44	

==== Heat 7 ====
Rank	Name	Nationality	Time	Notes
1	João de Oliveira	Brazil	51.92	Q
2	Jonathan Puemi	Switzerland	53.25	Q
3	Sheroid Evans	United States	53.44	Q
4	José Castañeda	Mexico	53.62	
5	Mitja Lindic	Slovenia	54.15	
6	Abdul Samsuddin	Malaysia	54.21	
7	Dmitriy Koblov	Kazakhstan	54.31	

== Participation ==
According to an unofficial count, 49 athletes from 38 countries participated in the event.

- Algeria (1)
- Australia (1)
- Bahamas (1)
- Belgium (1)
- Brazil (2)
- Canada (2)
- Chinese Taipei (1)
- Czech Republic (1)
- Dominican Republic (1)
- Estonia (1)
- France (2)
- Germany (2)
- Ireland (2)
- Italy (2)
- Jamaica (2)
- Japan (1)
- Kazakhstan (1)
- Kenya (2)
- Kuwait (1)
- Malaysia (1)
- Mauritius (1)
- Mexico (2)
- New Zealand (1)
- Norway (1)
- Romania (1)
- Saudi Arabia (1)
- Senegal (1)
- Serbia (1)
- Slovenia (1)
- South Africa (2)
- Spain (1)
- Switzerland (1)
- Trinidad and Tobago (1)
- Tunisia (1)
- Ukraine (1)
- United Kingdom (1)
- United States (2)
- U.S. Virgin Islands (1)
