= Le Roux Hamman =

South African athlete

Personal information
- Born: 6 January 1992 (age 34)
- Education: University of Pretoria
- Height: 1.85 m (6 ft 1 in)
- Weight: 70 kg (154 lb)

Sport
- Sport: Athletics
- Event: 400 metres hurdles

Le Roux Hamman (born 6 January 1992) is a South African athlete competing in the 400 metres hurdles. He represented his country at the 2016 Summer Olympics without advancing from the first round.

His personal best in the event is 49.24 seconds set in Pretoria in 2016.

== International competitions ==
Year	Competition	Venue	Position	Event	Notes
2010	World Junior Championships	Moncton, Canada	23rd (h)	400 m hurdles	52.66
2010	World Junior Championships	Moncton, Canada	15th (h)	4 × 400 m relay	3:12.58
2016	Olympic Games	Rio de Janeiro, Brazil	26th (h)	400 m hurdles	49.72
2017	Universiade	Taipei, Taiwan	16th (sf)	400 m hurdles	51.18
2018	African Championships	Asaba, Nigeria	5th	400 m hurdles	50.53
2018	African Championships	Asaba, Nigeria	1st (h)	4 × 400 m relay	3:05.36
2024	African Championships	Douala, Cameroon	11th (h)	400 m hurdles	51.14
