= Zied Azizi =

Tunisian hurdler (born 1991)

Personal information
- Born: 11 June 1991 (age 35)
- Height: 1.90 m (6 ft 3 in)
- Weight: 78 kg (172 lb)

Sport
- Sport: Athletics
- Event: 400 m hurdles
Medal record
Men's athletics
Representing Tunisia
African Championships
Bronze medal – third place	2018 Asaba	400 m hurdles

Zied Azizi (born 11 June 1991) is a Tunisian athlete specialising in the 400 metres hurdles. He won a bronze medal at the 2018 Mediterranean Games.

His personal best in the event is 49.13 seconds set in Tarragona in 2018. This is the current national record.

== International competitions ==
Year	Competition	Venue	Position	Event	Notes
Representing Tunisia
2010	Arab Junior Championships	Cairo, Egypt	6th	400 m	48.39
2010	Arab Junior Championships	Cairo, Egypt	2nd	400 m hurdles	51.90
2010	World Junior Championships	Moncton, Canada	11th (sf)	400 m hurdles	51.84
2012	African Championships	Porto-Novo, Benin	9th (h)	400 m hurdles	51.25
2014	African Championships	Marrakesh, Morocco	11th (h)	400 m hurdles	51.76
2017	Arab Championships	Radès, Tunisia	3rd	400 m hurdles	50.05
2018	Mediterranean Games	Tarragona, Spain	3rd	400 m hurdles	49.13
2018	African Championships	Asaba, Nigeria	3rd	400 m hurdles	49.48

== Personal bests ==
Outdoor

- 200 metres – 21.62 (+0.7 m/s, Radés 2012)
- 400 metres – 47.29 (Reims 2016)
- 400 metres hurdles – 49.13 (Tarragona 2018)

Indoor

- 200 metres – 22.10 (Val-de-Reuil 2013)
- 400 metres – 48.34 (Belgrade 2017)
