= Johannes Maritz =

Namibian hurdler

Personal information
- Born: 20 December 1990 (age 35) Windhoek, Namibia
- Education: North-West University
- Height: 1.90 m (6 ft 3 in)
- Weight: 82 kg (181 lb)

Sport
- Country: Namibia
- Sport: Track and field
- Event: 400 metres hurdles

Johannes Gerhardus Maritz (born 20 December 1990) is a Namibian hurdler. He competed in the 400 metres hurdles event at the 2015 World Championships in Beijing without qualifying for the semifinals. His personal best in the 400 metres hurdles is 50.14 set in Potchefstroom in 2015.

== Competition record ==
Year	Competition	Venue	Position	Event	Notes
Representing Namibia
2009	African Junior Championships	Bambous, Mauritius	3rd	110 m hurdles (99 cm)	14.73
2009	African Junior Championships	Bambous, Mauritius	3rd	400 m hurdling	52.61
2011	Universiade	Shenzhen, China	23rd (h)	400 m hurdles	51.94
2011	Universiade	Shenzhen, China	13th (h)	4 × 100 m relay	41.51
2013	Universiade	Kazan, Russia	16th (h)	400 m hurdles	52.18
2014	African Championships	Marrakesh, Morocco	5th	400 m hurdles	50.38
2015	World Championships	Beijing, China	37th (h)	400 m hurdles	51.10
2015	African Games	Brazzaville, Republic of the Congo	10th (h)	400 m hurdles	51.20
2016	African Championships	Durban, South Africa	8th (h)	400 m hurdling	51.24
2017	Universiade	Taipei, Taiwan	11th (sf)	400 m hurdles	50.59
2018	Commonwealth Games	Gold Coast, Australia	13th (h)	400 m hurdles	50.41
2018	African Championships	Asaba, Nigeria	10th (h)	400 m hurdles	51.60
2018	African Championships	Asaba, Nigeria	9th (h)	4 × 400 m relay	3:11.53
