= 2024 African Championships in Athletics – Men's 400 metres hurdles =

400 meter hurdle event in 2024 African championship

Men's 400 metres hurdles at the 2024 African Championships in Athletics
- Venue: Japoma Stadium
- Location: Douala, Cameroon
- Dates: 21 June (heats); 22 June (final)
- Competitors: 22 from 13 nations
- Winning time: 48.88

Medalists
gold medal	Victor Ntweng	Botswana
silver medal	Kemorena Tisang	Botswana
bronze medal	Abdelmalik Lahoulou	Algeria

The men's 400 metres hurdles event at the 2024 African Championships in Athletics was held on 21 and 22 June in Douala, Cameroon.

== Records ==
Records before the 2024 African Athletics Championships
Record	Athlete (nation)	Time (s)	Location	Date
World record	Karsten Warholm (NOR)	45.94	Tokyo, Japan	3 August 2021
African record	Samuel Matete (ZAM)	47.10	Zurich, Switzerland	7 August 1991
Championship record	Amadou Dia Ba (SEN)	48.29	Cairo, Egypt	16 August 1985
World leading	Alison dos Santos (BRA)	46.63	Oslo, Norway	30 May 2024
African leading	Ezekiel Nathaniel (NGR)	48.00	Waco, United States	11 May 2024

== Results ==
=== Heats ===
Qualification: First 2 of each heat (Q) and the next 2 fastest (q) qualified for the final.

Rank	Heat	Name	Nationality	Time	Notes
1	2	Victor Ntweng	Botswana	49.13	Q
2	2	Wiseman Mukhobe	Kenya	49.51	Q
3	1	Kemorena Tisang	Botswana	49.93	Q
4	2	Saad Hinti	Morocco	50.41	q
5	3	Abdelmalik Lahoulou	Algeria	50.43	Q
6	1	Lindokuhle Gora	South Africa	50.54	Q
7	1	El Mehdi Dimocrati	Morocco	50.61	q
8	2	Dhlamini Sabelo	South Africa	50.66	
9	3	Bienvenu Sawadogo	Burkina Faso	50.71	Q
10	1	Rilwan Alowonle	Nigeria	50.95	
11	3	Le Roux Hamman	South Africa	51.14	
12	2	Stéphane Yato	Cameroon	51.20	
13	1	Andre Retief	Namibia	51.47	
13	3	Tshotlego Frecky	Botswana	51.47	
15	3	Kipkorir Rotich	Kenya	51.52	
16	1	Emmanuel Tamba Elengha	Republic of the Congo	51.87	NR
17	3	Ousmane Sidibé	Senegal	52.01	
18	2	Abebe Lemecha	Ethiopia	52.03	
19	1	Edward Ngunjiri	Kenya	52.25	
20	3	Yohannes Getaneh	Ethiopia	52.46	
21	2	Boubacar Drame	Senegal	52.55	
22	1	Geraud Houessou	Benin	54.06	
	2	Alex Al-Ameen	Nigeria	DNS	
	3	Nathaniel Ezekiel	Nigeria	DNS	

=== Final ===
Rank	Lane	Athlete	Nationality	Time	Notes
1st place, gold medalist(s)	5	Victor Ntweng	Botswana	48.88	
2nd place, silver medalist(s)	4	Kemorena Tisang	Botswana	49.24	
3rd place, bronze medalist(s)	6	Abdelmalik Lahoulou	Algeria	49.36	
4	3	Wiseman Mukhobe	Kenya	49.92	
5	7	Lindokuhle Gora	South Africa	50.61	
6	8	Bienvenu Sawadogo	Burkina Faso	50.76	
7	1	El Mehdi Dimocrati	Morocco	51.19	
	2	Saad Hinti	Morocco	DNS	

== See also ==
- Athletics at the 2023 African Games – Men's 400 metres hurdles
