= Athletics at the 2015 African Games – Men's 400 metres hurdles =

The men's 400 metres hurdles event at the 2015 African Games was held on 15 and 16 September.

== Medalists ==
Gold	Silver	Bronze
Abdelmalik Lahoulou; Algeria	Miloud Rahmani; Algeria	Mohamed Sghaier; Tunisia

== Results ==
=== Heats ===
Qualification: First 3 in each heat (Q) and the next 2 fastest (q) advanced to the final.

Rank	Heat	Name	Nationality	Time	Notes
1	2	William Mbevi Mutunga	Kenya	50.23	Q
2	1	Abdelmalik Lahoulou	Algeria	50.41	Q
2	2	Mohamed Sghaier	Tunisia	50.41	Q
4	2	Kurt Couto	Mozambique	50.47	Q
5	1	Miloud Rahmani	Algeria	50.58	Q
6	2	Saber Boukemouche	Algeria	50.61	q
7	2	Ziem Esau Somda	Burkina Faso	50.61	q, NR
8	1	Henry Okorie	Nigeria	51.07	Q
9	1	Kiprono Koskei	Kenya	51.18	
10	1	Gerhardus Maritz	Namibia	51.20	
11	1	Abebe Chala	Ethiopia	53.61	
12	2	Jean Martin Mbana	Republic of the Congo	54.56	

=== Final ===
Rank	Lane	Name	Nationality	Time	Notes
1st place, gold medalist(s)	4	Abdelmalik Lahoulou	Algeria	48.67	NR
2nd place, silver medalist(s)	6	Miloud Rahmani	Algeria	49.27	
3rd place, bronze medalist(s)	5	Mohamed Sghaier	Tunisia	49.32	
4	7	William Mbevi Mutunga	Kenya	49.43	SB
5	9	Kurt Couto	Mozambique	49.55	
6	3	Saber Boukemouche	Algeria	49.87	
7	8	Henry Okorie	Nigeria	50.01	
8	2	Ziem Esau Somda	Burkina Faso	51.02	SB
