= Nicholas Bett =

Kenyan hurdler (1990–2018)

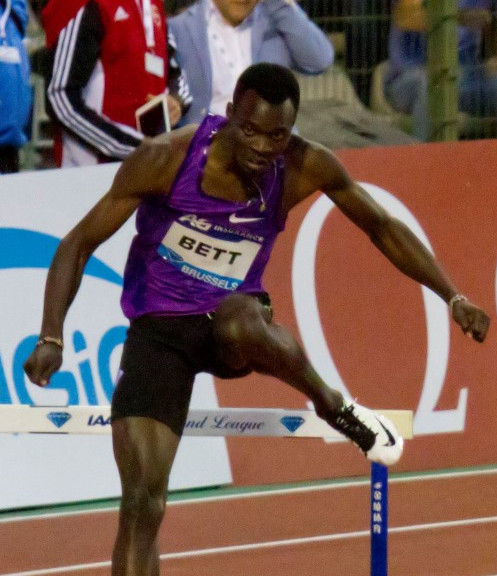

Personal information
- Born: 27 January 1990 Uasin Gishu County, Kenya
- Died: 8 August 2018 (aged 28) Nandi County, Kenya
- Height: 1.90 m (6 ft 3 in)
- Weight: 75 kg (165 lb)

Sport
- Sport: Athletics
- Event: 400 metres hurdles
- Club: Team Kenya
- Coached by: Vincent Mumo Kiilu
Medal record
Men's athletics
Representing Kenya
World Championships
Gold medal – first place	2015 Beijing	400 m hurdles
African Championships
Bronze medal – third place	2014 Marrakesh	400 m hurdles
Bronze medal – third place	2014 Marrakesh	4×400 m

Nicholas Kiplagat Bett (27 January 1990 – 8 August 2018) was a Kenyan track and field athlete who competed in the 400 metres hurdles. His personal best for the event is 47.79 seconds. He was a world champion in the event, having won in 2015, and a two-time bronze medallist at the African Championships in Athletics. He died in a road accident in Kenya at the age of 28.

== Career ==
His first outing at national level was in 2010, when he was a Kenyan junior finalist. He made his breakthrough nationally at senior level with a run of 50.39 seconds to place third at the Kenyan Athletics Championships in 2011. He missed most of the 2012 season but returned in 2013 with runner-up finishes at both the national championships and world trials. A new personal best of 49.70 seconds at the latter meet placed him 53rd globally for the season.

Another runner-up finish at the national level earned him selection for both the 2014 Commonwealth Games and the 2014 African Championships in Athletics. At the Commonwealth Games he failed to make the 400 m hurdles final and was also eliminated in the heats of the 4 × 400 m relay after Kenya were disqualified. At the African Championships in Athletics, he won a bronze medal in the 400 m hurdles, achieving a new personal best of 49.03 seconds, and a bronze medal in the 4 × 400 m relay with teammates Mark Mutai, Solomon Buoga and Boniface Mucheru.

Bett began to compete on the international track and field circuit in 2015 and had wins at the Savo Games and Lappeenranta Games in Finland. A personal best of 48.29 seconds at the 2015 Athletics Kenya World Championship Trials brought him selection for the national team and raised him to third on the global rankings. At the 2015 World Athletics Championships in Beijing, Bett achieved his biggest result, winning the 400 metres hurdles event with a time of 47.79 seconds. Bett's win was Kenya's first in the history of the World Championships, for an event shorter than 800 metres. Bett's Beijing run was the fastest time for the distance in the whole of the 2015 season.

Bett had a poor start to the 2016 season, with a season's best time of 49.31 going into the 2016 Olympic Games in Rio de Janeiro. However, Bett was still considered one of the favourites for the 400 metres hurdles event, following his 2015 World Championships win. However, he made a mistake in the preliminary round when he tripped over the 10th and final hurdle whilst in second place. He eventually finished last in the heat, but was disqualified anyway, and failed to reach the semifinal.

== Personal life ==
Bett's twin brother, Aron Koech, is also a 400 metres hurdler.

Bett died in a road accident near the town of Lessos, in Nandi County, Kenya, in the early morning of 8 August 2018. He had arrived back from the 2018 African Championships in Athletics in Nigeria two days earlier, and was driving along the Kapsabet to Eldoret road on his way back to Nairobi. According to the local police commander, Bett lost control of his car, a Toyota Prado SUV, which then hit a bump in the road and landed in a ditch, killing the athlete instantly.

== International competitions ==
Year	Competition	Venue	Position	Event	Notes
2014	Commonwealth Games	Glasgow, United Kingdom	14th (h)	400 m hurdles	51.21
2014	Commonwealth Games	Glasgow, United Kingdom	—	4 × 400 m relay	DQ
2014	African Championships	Marrakesh, Morocco	3rd	400 m hurdles	49.03
2014	African Championships	Marrakesh, Morocco	3rd	4 × 400 m relay	3:07.35
2015	World Championships	Beijing, China	1st	400 m hurdles	47.79
2016	Olympic Games	Rio de Janeiro, Brazil	–	400 m hurdles	DQ
2018	Commonwealth Games	Gold Coast, Australia	8th	400 m hurdles	51.00
2018	Commonwealth Games	Gold Coast, Australia	-	4 × 400 m relay	DQ
2018	African Championships	Asaba, Nigeria	3rd (h)	400 m hurdles	49.88^{1}

^{1}Did not finish in the final
