= Takatoshi Abe =

Japanese hurdler (born 1991)

Personal information
- Nationality: Japan
- Born: 12 November 1991 (age 34) Okayama Prefecture, Japan
- Education: Chukyo University
- Height: 1.92 m (6 ft 4 in)
- Weight: 81 kg (179 lb)

Sport
- Sport: Track and field
- Event: 400 m hurdles
- Club: Yamada Denki Athletics Club

Achievements and titles
- Personal best: 48.68 (Fukuroi 2018)
Medal record
Men's athletics
Representing Japan
Asian Championships
Gold medal – first place	2011 Kobe	400 m hurdles
Asian Games
Bronze medal – third place	2018 Jakarta-Palembang	400 m hurdles
Bronze medal – third place	2018 Jakarta-Palembang	4 × 400 m relay
World Junior Championships
Silver medal – second place	2010 Moncton	400 m hurdles
Universiade
Silver medal – second place	2011 Shenzhen	4x400 m relay

Takatoshi Abe (安部孝駿, Abe Takatoshi; born 12 November 1991) is a Japanese track and field athlete who competes in the 400 metres hurdles. He is the reigning Asian champion in the event.

Born in Okayama Prefecture, Abe initially contested both the 110 metres hurdles and the 400 m hurdles, winning silver and gold medals at the Japanese high school championships in 2009. He chose to specialise in the latter event from mid-2009 onwards. Abe ran a personal best of 49.46 seconds to claim the silver medal at the 2010 World Junior Championships in Athletics, finishing closely behind the strong favourite Jehue Gordon. He also ran with the Japanese 4×400 metres relay team, helping them to fifth place. His hurdles time made him the third best Asian in the event that year, after compatriots Kenji Narisako and Takayuki Koike.

Abe made his second ever sub-50-second clocking at the 2011 Japanese Athletics Championships, where he took third with a time of 49.81 seconds. He was selected to represent Japan at the 2011 Asian Athletics Championships in Kobe and he went away with his first regional title, ending the race with a time of 49.64 seconds to win the gold medal.

He competed at the 2020 Summer Olympics.

== International competition ==
Year	Competition	Venue	Position	Event	Time (s)	Notes
Representing Japan and Asia-Pacific (Continental Cup only)
2010	World Junior Championships	Brunswick, Canada	2nd	400 m hurdles	49.46	PB
2010	World Junior Championships	Brunswick, Canada	5th	4×400 m relay	3:07.94 (relay leg: 4th)	
2011	Asian Championships	Kobe, Japan	1st	400 m hurdles	49.64	SB
2011	Universiade	Shenzhen, China	13th (sf)	400 m hurdles	50.96	
2011	Universiade	Shenzhen, China	2nd	4×400 m relay	3:05.16 (relay leg: 4th)	
2011	World Championships	Daegu, South Korea	33rd (h)	400 m hurdles	51.90	
2013	World Championships	Moscow, Russia	32nd (h)	400 m hurdles	51.41	
2017	World Championships	London, United Kingdom	14th (sf)	400 m hurdles	49.93	
2018	Asian Games	Jakarta-Palembang, Indonesia	3rd	400 m hurdles	49.12	
2018	Asian Games	Jakarta-Palembang, Indonesia	3rd	4×400 m relay	3:01.94 (relay leg: 3rd)	SB
2018	Continental Cup	Ostrava, Czech Republic	6th	400 m hurdles	49.80	
2019	Asian Championships	Doha, Qatar	5th	400 m hurdles	49.74	
2019	World Championships	Doha, Qatar	10th (sf)	400 m hurdles	48.97	
2021	Olympic Games	Tokyo, Japan	28th (h)	400 m hurdles	49.98	

== National titles ==
- Japanese Championships
  - 400 m hurdles: 2017, 2019, 2020
