= Abdelmalik Lahoulou =

Algerian athlete (born 1992)

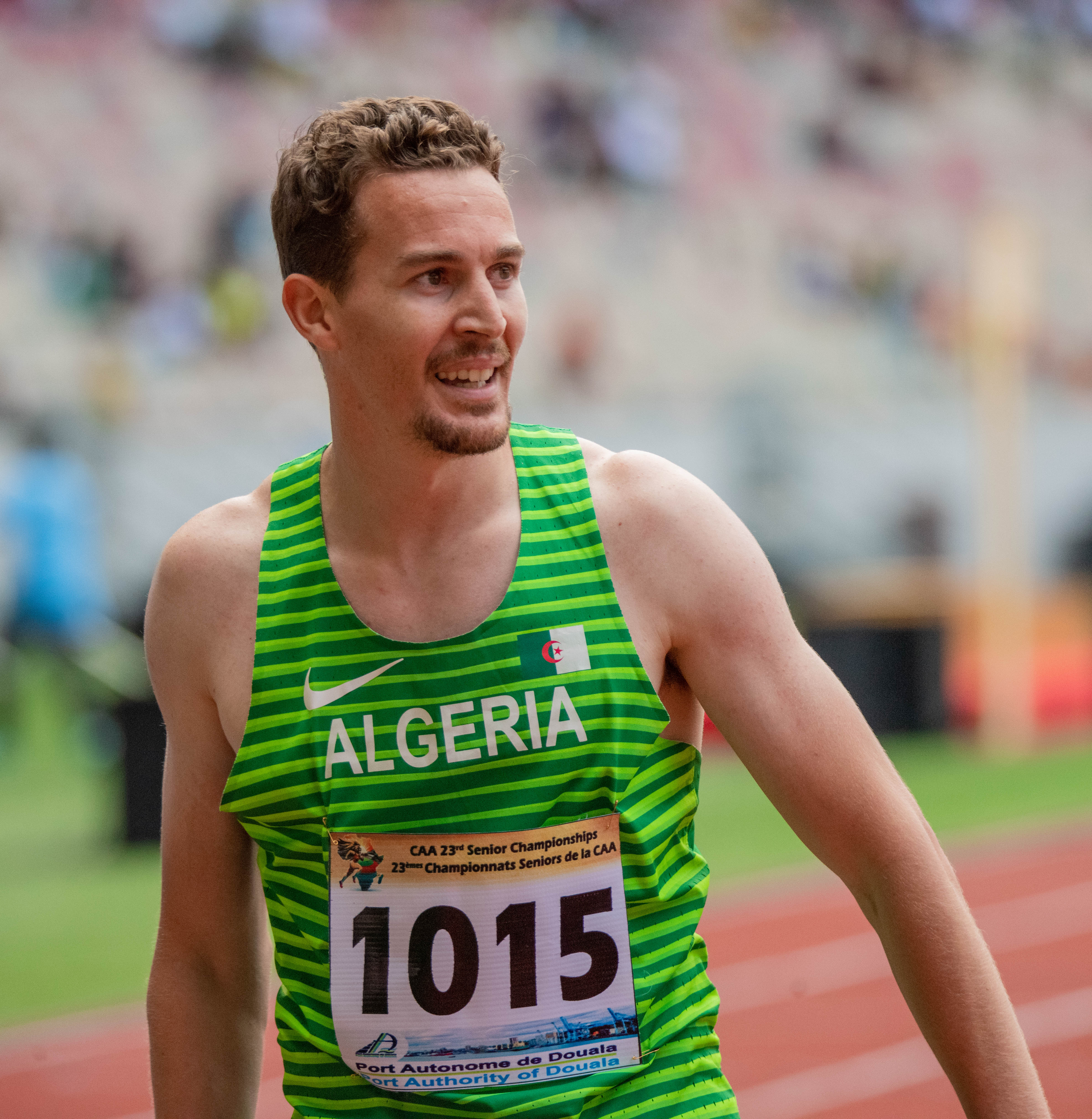
- Lahoulou at the 2024 African Championships in Athletics

Personal information
- Born: 7 May 1992 (age 34) Jijel, Algeria
- Height: 183 cm (6 ft 0 in)
- Weight: 72 kg (159 lb)

Sport
- Country: Algeria
- Sport: Athletics
- Event: 400 m hurdles / 4x400 m Relay

Achievements and titles
- Highest world ranking: Finalist at the 2019 IAAF World Athletics Championships - Doha
- Personal best: 48.39 (2019)
Medal record
Men's athletics
Representing Algeria
African Games
| Gold medal – first place | 2015 Brazzaville | 400 m hurdles |
| Gold medal – first place | 2019 Rabat | 400 m hurdles |
African Championships
| Gold medal – first place | 2018 Asaba | 400 m hurdles |
| Silver medal – second place | 2022 Port Louis | 400 m hurdles |
| Bronze medal – third place | 2024 Douala | 400 m hurdles |
Military World Games
| Gold medal – first place | 2015 Mungyeong | 400 m hurdles |
| Silver medal – second place | 2015 Mungyeong | 4x400 m Relay |
| Silver medal – second place | 2019 Wuhan | 400 m hurdles |
| Bronze medal – third place | 2019 Wuhan | 4x400 m Relay |
Mediterranean Games
| Gold medal – first place | 2022 Oran | 4x400 m Relay |
| Bronze medal – third place | 2022 Oran | 400 m hurdles |
| Bronze medal – third place | 2018 Tarragona | 4x400 m Relay |
World University Games
| Silver medal – second place | 2015 Gwangju | 400 m hurdles |
| Bronze medal – third place | 2017 Taipei | 400 m hurdles |

Abdelmalik Lahoulou (born 7 May 1992) is an Algerian athlete specializing in the 400 metres hurdles. He won the gold at the 2015 African Games, 2015 Military World Games, 2019 African Games and the silver at the 2015 Summer Universiade, 2022 African Championships in Athletics and more. His personal best in the event is 48.47 seconds set at the 2018 African Championships in Athletics. This was the national record before he improved it to 48.39 at the 2019 World Athletics Championships in Doha.

== Competition record ==
| Year | Competition | Venue | Position | Event | Notes |
Representing Algeria
| 2009 | World Youth Championships | Brixen, Italy | 20th (h) | 400 m hurdles (84 cm) | 55.30 |
| 2009 | World Youth Championships | Brixen, Italy | | Medley relay | DQ |
| 2009 | Arab Youth Athletics Championships | Aleppo, Syria | 2nd | 400 m hurdles (84 cm) | 53.08 |
| 2010 | World Junior Championships | Moncton, Canada | 29th (h) | 400 m hurdles | 53.00 |
| 2011 | African Junior Championships | Gaborone, Botswana | 1st | 400 m hurdles | 51.69 |
| 2013 | Mediterranean Games | Mersin, Turkey | 7th | 400 m hurdles | 51.09 |
| 2013 | Mediterranean Games | Mersin, Turkey | 4th | 4 × 400 m relay | 3:08.27 |
| 2013 | Islamic Solidarity Games | Palembang, Indonesia | 1st | 400 m hurdles | 50.96 |
| 2013 | Islamic Solidarity Games | Palembang, Indonesia | 3rd | 4 × 400 m relay | 3:09.04 |
| 2014 | African Championships | Marrakesh, Morocco | 10th (h) | 400 m hurdles | 51.67 |
| 2015 | Universiade | Gwangju, South Korea | 2nd | 400 m hurdles | 48.99 |
| 2015 | World Championships | Beijing, China | 14th (sf) | 400 m hurdles | 48.87 |
| 2015 | African Games | Brazzaville, Republic of the Congo | 1st | 400 m hurdles | 48.67 |
| 2015 | African Games | Brazzaville, Republic of the Congo | 3rd | 4 × 400 m relay | 3:03.07 |
| 2015 | Military World Games | Mungyeong, South Korea | 1st | 400 m hurdles | 49.43 |
| 2015 | Military World Games | Mungyeong, South Korea | 2nd | 4 × 400 m relay | 3:03.78 |
| 2016 | Olympic Games | Rio de Janeiro, Brazil | 13th (sf) | 400 m hurdles | 49.08 |
| 2017 | Arab Championship | Radès, Tunisia | 1st | 400 m hurdles | 49.05 |
| 2017 | Arab Championship | Radès, Tunisia | 1st | 4 × 400 m relay | 3:05.49 |
| 2017 | World Championships | London, United Kingdom | 10th (sf) | 400 m hurdles | 49.33 |
| 2017 | Universiade | Taipei, Taiwan | 3rd | 400 m hurdles | 49.30 |
| 2018 | Mediterranean Games | Tarragona, Spain | 4th | 400 m hurdles | 49.45 |
| 2018 | Mediterranean Games | Tarragona, Spain | 3rd | 4 × 400 m relay | 3:05.28 |
| 2018 | African Championships | Asaba, Nigeria | 1st | 400 m hurdles | 48.47 |
| 2018 | African Championships | Asaba, Nigeria | 5th | 4 × 400 m relay | 3:05.27 |
| 2018 | IAAF Continental Cup | Ostrava, Czech Republic | 5th | 400 m hurdles | 49.12 |
| 2019 | Arab Championships | Cairo, Egypt | 1st | 400 m hurdles | 48.95 |
| 2019 | Arab Championships | Cairo, Egypt | 2nd | 4 × 400 m relay | 3:07.85 |
| 2019 | African Games | Rabat, Morocco | 1st | 400 m hurdles | 49.08 |
| 2019 | World Championships | Doha, Qatar | 8th | 400 m hurdles | 49.46 |
| 2019 | Military World Games | Wuhan, China | 2nd | 400 m hurdles | 49.68 |
| 2019 | Military World Games | Wuhan, China | 3rd | 4 × 400 m relay | 3:06.67 |
| 2021 | Arab Championship | Radès, Tunisia | 1st | 400 m hurdles | 49.45 |
| 2021 | Olympic Games | Tokyo, Japan | 18th (sf) | 400 m hurdles | 49.14 |
| 2022 | African Championships | Port Louis, Mauritius | 2nd | 400 m hurdles | 50.10 |
| 2022 | Mediterranean Games | Oran, Algeria | 3rd | 400 m hurdles | 48.87 |
| 2022 | Mediterranean Games | Oran, Algeria | 1st | 4 × 400 m relay | 3:03.41 |
| 2022 | World Championships | Eugene, United States | 10th (sf) | 400 m hurdles | 48.90 |
| 2022 | Islamic Solidarity Games | Konya, Turkey | 3rd | 400 m hurdles | 49.15 |
| 2022 | Islamic Solidarity Games | Konya, Turkey | 2nd | 4 × 400 m relay | 3:04.52 |
| 2023 | Arab Games | Oran, Algeria | 2nd | 400 m hurdles | 49.47 |
| 2023 | World Championships | Budapest, Hungary | – | 400 m hurdles | DNF |
| 2024 | African Games | Accra, Ghana | 6th | 400 m hurdles | 50.34 |
| 2024 | African Championships | Douala, Cameroon | 3rd | 400 m hurdles | 49.36 |
| 2025 | Arab Championships | Oran, Algeria | 4th | 400 m hurdles | 50.97 |
