= Mohamed Sghaier =

Tunisian hurdler (born 1988)

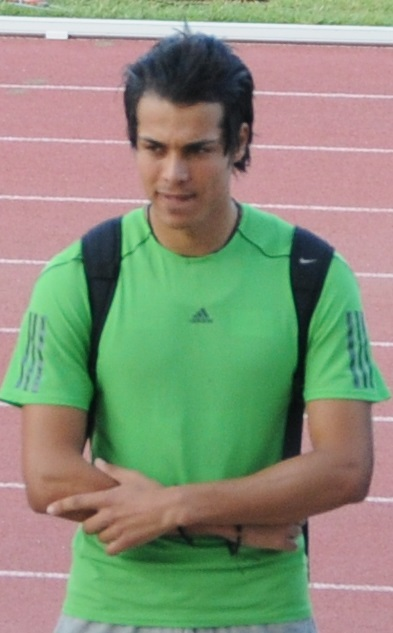
- Sghaier in 2012

Personal information
- Born: 18 July 1988 (age 38)
- Education: Superior Institute for Sport and Physical Education Ksar Said
- Height: 1.85 m (6 ft 1 in)
- Weight: 79 kg (174 lb)

Sport
- Country: Tunisia
- Sport: Track and field
- Event: 400 metres hurdles
Medal record
Men's athletics
Representing Tunisia
Arab Athletics Championships
Silver medal – second place	2013 Doha	400 m hurdles
Jeux de la Francophonie
Bronze medal – third place	2013 Nice	400 m hurdles
African Junior Athletics Championships
Silver medal – second place	2005 Radès	4x400 m relay
African Games
Bronze medal – third place	2015 Brazzaville	400 m hurdles

Mohamed Sghaier (born 18 July 1988) is a Tunisian hurdler. He competed in the 400 metres hurdles event at the 2015 World Championships in Beijing getting disqualified in the first round.His personal best in the 400 metres hurdles is 49.22 seconds set in La Chaux-de-Fonds in 2015. This is the current national record.

== Competition record ==
Year	Competition	Venue	Position	Event	Notes
Representing Tunisia
2005	African Junior Championships	Radès, Tunisia	7th	400 m hurdles	54.38
2005	African Junior Championships	Radès, Tunisia	2nd	4 × 400 m hurdles	3:12.43
2006	World Junior Championships	Beijing, China	29th (h)	400 m hurdles	53.89
2009	Mediterranean Games	Pescara, Italy	4th	400 m hurdles	51.25
2009	Mediterranean Games	Pescara, Italy	6th	4 × 400 m relay	3:08.75
2009	Jeux de la Francophonie	Beirut, Lebanon	8th	400 m hurdles	54.67
2010	African Championships	Nairobi, Kenya	6th	400 m hurdles	50.05
2012	African Championships	Porto-Novo, Benin	5th	400 m hurdles	50.37
2013	Arab Championships	Doha, Qatar	2nd	400 m hurdles	50.94
2013	Jeux de la Francophonie	Nice, France	3rd	400 m hurdles	50.46
2014	African Championships	Marrakesh, Morocco	6th	400 m hurdles	50.62
2015	World Championships	Beijing, China	–	400 m hurdles	DQ
2015	African Games	Brazzaville, Republic of the Congo	3rd	400 m hurdles	49.32
2016	Olympic Games	Rio de Janeiro, Brazil	36th (h)	400 m hurdles	50.09
