= 2010 World Junior Championships in Athletics – Men's 4 × 400 metres relay =

The men's 4x400 metres relay event at the 2010 World Junior Championships in Athletics was held in Moncton, New Brunswick, Canada, at Moncton Stadium on 24 and 25 July.

== Medalists ==
| Gold | Josh Mance; Errol Nolan; David Verburg; Michael Berry; United States |
| Silver | Japhet Samuel; Tobi Ogunmola; Jonathan Nmaju; Isah Salihu; Nigeria |
| Brown | Nathan Wake; Dan Putnam; Sebastian Rodger; Jack Green; United Kingdom |

== Results ==
=== Final ===
25 July

| Rank | Nation | Competitors | Time | Notes |
|---|---|---|---|---|
| 1st place, gold medalist(s) | United States | Josh Mance; Errol Nolan; David Verburg; Michael Berry | 3:04.76 | |
| 2nd place, silver medalist(s) | Nigeria | Japhet Samuel; Tobi Ogunmola; Jonathan Nmaju; Isah Salihu | 3:06.36 | |
| 3rd place, bronze medalist(s) | United Kingdom | Nathan Wake; Dan Putnam; Sebastian Rodger; Jack Green | 3:06.49 | |
| 4 | Jamaica | Demar Murray; Javere Bell; Jermaine Gayle; Dwayne Extol | 3:07.36 | |
| 5 | Japan | Keitaro Sato; Jun Kimura; Junki Yanagisawa; Takatoshi Abe | 3:07.94 | |
| 6 | Germany | Marco Kaiser; Varg Königsmark; Philipp Kleemann; Tobias Giehl | 3:09.08 | |
| 7 | Botswana | Thapelo Ketlogetswe; Daniel Lagamang; Opadile Merafe; Pako Seribe | 3:10.74 | |
| 8 | Poland | Mateusz Zagórski; Tomasz Kwiatkowski; Radosław Cichoń; Mateusz Fórmanski | 3:11.80 | |

=== Heats ===
24 July

==== Heat 1 ====
| Rank | Nation | Competitors | Time | Notes |
|---|---|---|---|---|
| 1 | Germany | Marco Kaiser; Philipp Kleemann; Benedikt Wiesend; Niklas Müller | 3:08.79 | Q |
| 2 | Poland | Mateusz Fórmanski; Tomasz Kwiatkowski; Radosław Cichoń; Mateusz Zagórski | 3:08.80 | Q |
| 3 | New Zealand | Alex Jordan; Joseph Millar; Scott Burch; Tama Toki | 3:10.83 | |
| 4 | Australia | Steven Solomon; Joel Bee; Sasha Alexeenko; Grant Billingham | 3:11.19 | |
| 5 | Italy | Lorenzo Valentini; Michele Tricca; Francesco Patano; José Bencosme De Leon | 3:12.32 | |
| 6 | France | Stéphane Zenou-Yato; Vincent Michalet; Hakim Reguieg; Jonathan Vilaine | 3:13.34 | |
| | Canada | Tremaine Harris; Adam Gaudes; Alistair Moona; Michael Trnkus | DQ | IAAF rule 170.8 |

==== Heat 2 ====
| Rank | Nation | Competitors | Time | Notes |
|---|---|---|---|---|
| 1 | United Kingdom | Nathan Wake; Dan Putnam; Sebastian Rodger; Jack Green | 3:06.88 | Q |
| 2 | Nigeria | Japhet Samuel; Tobi Ogunmola; Jonathan Nmaju; Isah Salihu | 3:07.17 | Q |
| 3 | Botswana | Thapelo Ketlogetswe; Daniel Lagamang; Opadile Merafe; Pako Seribe | 3:08.32 | q |
| 4 | Trinidad and Tobago | Kishon Dempster; Kevin Haynes; Osei Alleyne-Forte; Deon Lendore | 3:10.87 | |
| 5 | Kenya | Benjamin Auka Nyasimi; Hillary Kipkorir Maiyo; Jeremiah Mutai; Boniface Mucheru Tumuti | 3:12.18 | |
| 6 | Bahamas | Earl Rahming; Alonzo Russell; Delano Deveaux; Nejmi Burnside | 3:14.42 | |

==== Heat 3 ====
| Rank | Nation | Competitors | Time | Notes |
|---|---|---|---|---|
| 1 | United States | Blake Heriot; David Verburg; Joshua Edmonds; Michael Berry | 3:05.84 | Q |
| 2 | Japan | Keitaro Sato; Jun Kimura; Junki Yanagisawa; Takatoshi Abe | 3:07.38 | Q |
| 3 | Jamaica | Demar Murray; Javere Bell; Naseive Denton; Dwayne Extol | 3:07.86 | q |
| 4 | Spain | Samuel García; Xavier Carrión; Mohamed Ezzagnouni; Pablo Fernández | 3:11.59 | |
| 5 | South Africa | Shaun De Jager; Peter Marx; Le Roux Hamman; Jacques de Swardt | 3:12.58 | |
| 6 | Saudi Arabia | Bandar Atiyah Kaabi; Abdullah Ahmed Abkar; Mohamed Sico Ibrahim; Abdul Aziz Mohamed | 3:14.95 | |

== Participant's ==
According to an unofficial count, 81 athletes from 19 countries participated in the event.

- Australia (4)
- Bahamas (4)
- Botswana (4)
- Canada (4)
- France (4)
- Germany (6)
- Italy (4)
- Jamaica (5)
- Japan (4)
- Kenya (4)
- New Zealand (4)
- Nigeria (4)
- Poland (4)
- Saudi Arabia (4)
- South Africa (4)
- Spain (4)
- Trinidad and Tobago (4)
- United Kingdom (4)
- United States (6)
