= Saber Boukemouche =

Algerian hurdler (born 1992)

Personal information
- Born: 20 April 1992 (age 33)
- Education: Essts Alger
- Height: 1.93 m (6 ft 4 in)
- Weight: 82 kg (181 lb)

Sport
- Sport: Track and field
- Event: 400 metres hurdles
- Club: CA MONTREUIL 93 France
- Coached by: Mahour Bacha Ahmed

Saber Boukemouche (born 20 April 1992) is an Algerian athlete who specialises in the 400 metres hurdles. He represented his country at the 2015 World Championships in Beijing without qualifying for the semifinals.

His personal best in the event is 49.43 seconds set in Algiers in 2015.

He is a three-time Arab medalist 2015/2019/2023 and a bronze medalist at the 2018 Mediterranean Games in Tarragona Spain .

== International competitions ==
Year	Competition	Venue	Position	Event	Notes
Representing Algeria
2011	African Junior Championships	Gaborone, Botswana	–	110 m hurdles (99 cm)	DQ
2011	African Junior Championships	Gaborone, Botswana	7th	400 m hurdles	54.87
2014	African Championships	Marrakesh, Morocco	7th	400 m hurdles	50.67
2015	Arab Championships	Isa Town, Bahrain	2nd	400 m hurdles	50.31
2015	Universiade	Gwangju, South Korea	36th (h)	400 m hurdles	54.41
2015	World Championships	Beijing, China	38th (h)	400 m hurdles	51.54
2015	African Games	Brazzaville, Republic of the Congo	6th	400 m hurdles	49.87
2017	Universiade	Taipei, Taiwan	19th (sf)	400 m hurdles	51.63
2017	Universiade	Taipei, Taiwan	8th (h)	4 × 400 m relay	3:09.84
2018	Mediterranean Games	Tarragona, Spain	6th	400 m hurdles	50.16
2018	Mediterranean Games	Tarragona, Spain	3rd	4 × 400 m relay	3:05.28
2018	African Championships	Asaba, Nigeria	8th (h)	400 m hurdles	51.00^{1}
2019	Arab Championships	Cairo, Egypt	2nd	400 m hurdles	50.41
2022	Mediterranean Games	Oran, Algeria	6th	400 m hurdles	50.01
2022	Islamic Solidarity Games	Konya, Turkey	5th	400 m hurdles	49.74
2023	Arab Games	Oran, Algeria	3rd	400 m hurdles	50.10
2025	Arab Championships	Oran, Algeria	3rd	400 m hurdles	50.16

^{1}Did not start in the final
