= Bienvenu Sawadogo =

Burkinabé sprinter (born 1995)

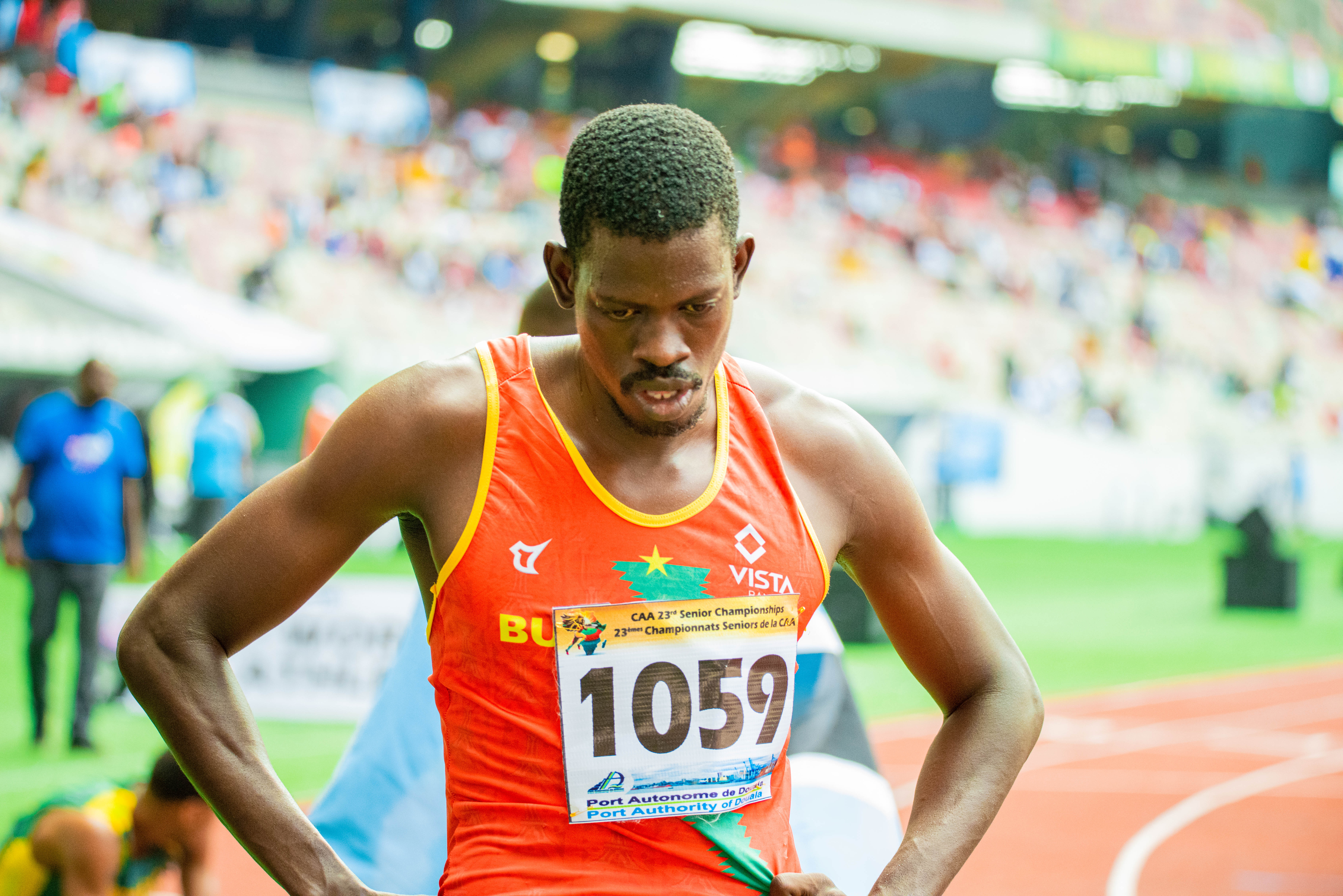
- Bienvenu W. Sawadogo in 2024

Personal information
- Full name: Bienvenu Wendlasida Sawadogo
- Born: 31 December 1995 (age 30)
- Education: Higher School of CS & Business Administration

Sport
- Sport: Athletics
- Event: 400 metres
Medal record
Men's athletics
Representing Burkina Faso
African Games
Silver medal – second place	2019 Rabat	400 m hurdles

Bienvenu Wendlasida Sawadogo (born 31 December 1995) is a Burkinabé sprinter specialising in the 400 metres. He won a silver medal at the 2017 Jeux de la Francophonie. His personal best of 46.66 is the current national record.

== International competitions ==
Year	Competition	Venue	Position	Event	Notes
Representing Burkina Faso
2011	World Youth Championships	Lille, France	30th (q)	Triple jump	14.00 m
2013	African Junior Championships	Bambous, Mauritius	7th	400 m hurdles	55.09
2013	African Junior Championships	Bambous, Mauritius	9th	Long jump	7.01 m w
2014	African Championships	Marrakesh, Morocco	–	400 m hurdles	DQ
2015	African Games	Brazzaville, Republic of the Congo	28th (h)	200 m	21.57
2016	African Championships	Durban, South Africa	22nd (sf)	200 m	21.85
2016	African Championships	Durban, South Africa	15th	Triple jump	14.78 m
2017	Jeux de la Francophonie	Abidjan, Ivory Coast	2nd	400 m	46.89
2017	Jeux de la Francophonie	Abidjan, Ivory Coast	7th	4 × 100 m relay	41.21
2017	Jeux de la Francophonie	Abidjan, Ivory Coast	5th (h)	4 × 400 m relay	3:18.86
2017	Universiade	Taipei, Taiwan	24th (sf)	400 m	48.15
2018	African Championships	Asaba, Nigeria	21st (h)	200 m	21.42
2018	African Championships	Asaba, Nigeria	16th (sf)	400 m	47.34
2019	African Games	Rabat, Morocco	2nd	400 m hurdles	49.25
2019	World Championships	Doha, Qatar	–	400 m hurdles	DQ
2022	African Championships	Port Louis, Mauritius	6th	400 m hurdles	51.71
2023	Jeux de la Francophonie	Kinshasa, DR Congo	3rd	400 m hurdles	50.34
2024	African Games	Accra, Ghana	16th (h)	400 m hurdles	53.04
2024	BRICS Games	Kazan, Russia	3rd	400 m hurdles	50.83
2024	African Championships	Douala, Cameroon	6th	400 m hurdles	50.76
2026	African Championships	Accra, Ghana	5th	Triple jump	15.94 m w

== Personal bests ==
Outdoor

- 200 metres – 21.57 (+0.8 m/s) (Brazzaville 2015) NR
- 400 metres – 46.66 (Bonneuil-sur-Marne 2019) NR
- 400 metres hurdles – 49.25 (Prince Moulay Abdellah, Rabat (MAR) 29 AUG 2019 NR)
