= Cornel Fredericks =

South African hurdler

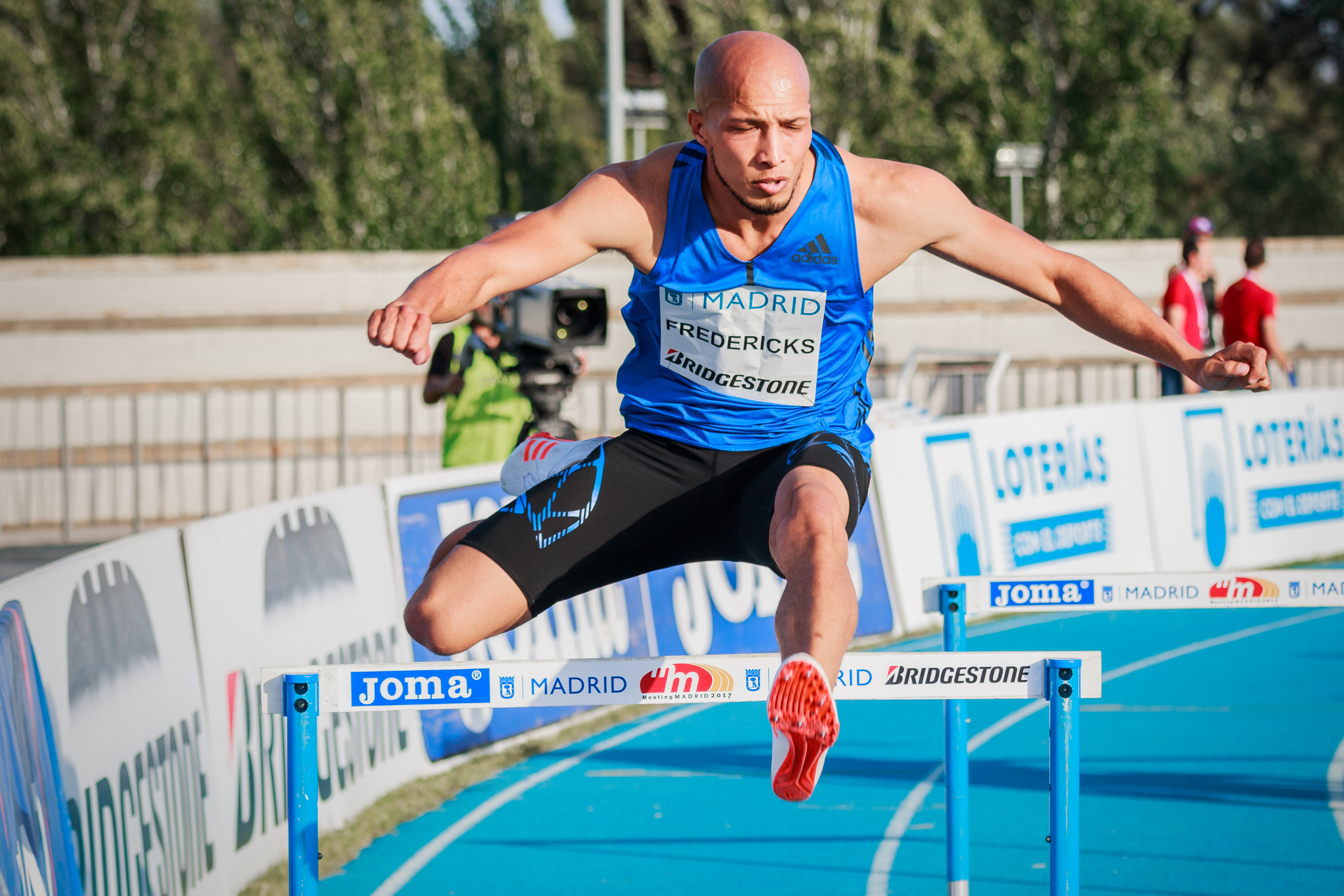

Personal information
- Full name: Cornel Edwin Fredericks
- Nationality: South African
- Born: 30 March 1990 (age 36) Worcester, South Africa
- Height: 1.78 m (5 ft 10 in)
- Weight: 68 kg (150 lb; 10.7 st)

Sport
- Sport: Track and field
- Event: 400 m hurdles
Medal record
Men's athletics
Representing South Africa
Commonwealth Games
Gold medal – first place	2014 Glasgow	400 m hurdles
African Championships
Gold medal – first place	2014 Marrakesh	400 m hurdles
Silver medal – second place	2010 Nairobi	400 m hurdles
Silver medal – second place	2018 Asaba	400 m hurdles
Silver medal – second place	2018 Asaba	4×400 m
Representing Africa
Continental Cup
Gold medal – first place	2014 Marrakesh	400 m hurdles

Cornel Edwin Fredericks (born 3 March 1990) is a South African track and field athlete who competes in the 400 metres hurdles. His personal best for the event is 48.14 seconds.

He was the silver medallist at the 2010 African Championships in Athletics and came fifth in the final at the 2011 World Championships.

== Career ==
In his earliest international outing, Fredericks won a bronze medal in the 110 metres hurdles and a silver medal in the 400 m hurdles at the 2006 Gymnasiade. He was fifth in the 400 m event at the 2007 World Youth Championships in Athletics and improved to fourth place at the 2008 World Junior Championships. Later that year he ran at the 2008 Commonwealth Youth Games, coming second in the 110 m hurdles and helping the South African 4×400 metres relay team to fourth place. In his final year of junior competitions, he won both the hurdles events at the 2009 African Junior Athletics Championships as well as a silver medal in the relay.

He came second in the 400 m hurdles at the 2009 South African Championships behind Wouter le Roux and won the national universities title. As a result, he competed at the 2009 Summer Universiade where he finished fourth in a personal best of 49.93 seconds. The 2010 season saw him established himself as a senior athlete. He won first national title in the 400 m hurdles with a clocking of 49.70 seconds. He improved his personal best several times that year, culminating in a run of 48.79 seconds to take the silver medal at the 2010 African Championships in Athletics, completing a South African 1–2 alongside the event winner L.J. van Zyl.

Fredericks was beaten by van Zyl at the 2011 South African Championships, but left the competition with a significant improvement on his personal best (48.14 seconds). On the circuit he was runner-up at the Doha Diamond League meeting and won in Tampere and at the KBC Night of Athletics. Fredericks entered the 2011 World Championships in Athletics as the fifth fastest 400 m hurdler of the year and he matched this ranking with a fifth-place finish in the 400 m hurdles world final.

He regained his national title in 2012, and then won it again in 2013 and 2014.

In 2012 Fredericks's coach Bruce Longden died, and Fredericks suffered a hamstring tear in the heats of the 2012 Olympics.

In July 2014, he won the gold medal in the 2014 Commonwealth Games, and then in August, he won the African Championships in the 400 m hurdles. That year he also won the 400 m hurdles at the Continental Cup, and ran the second fastest time that year (48.25).

His 2015 season was blighted by an achilles injury and a hamstring tear, which caused him to withdraw from the World Championships.
