= José Reynaldo Bencosme de Leon =

Italian hurdler (born 1992)

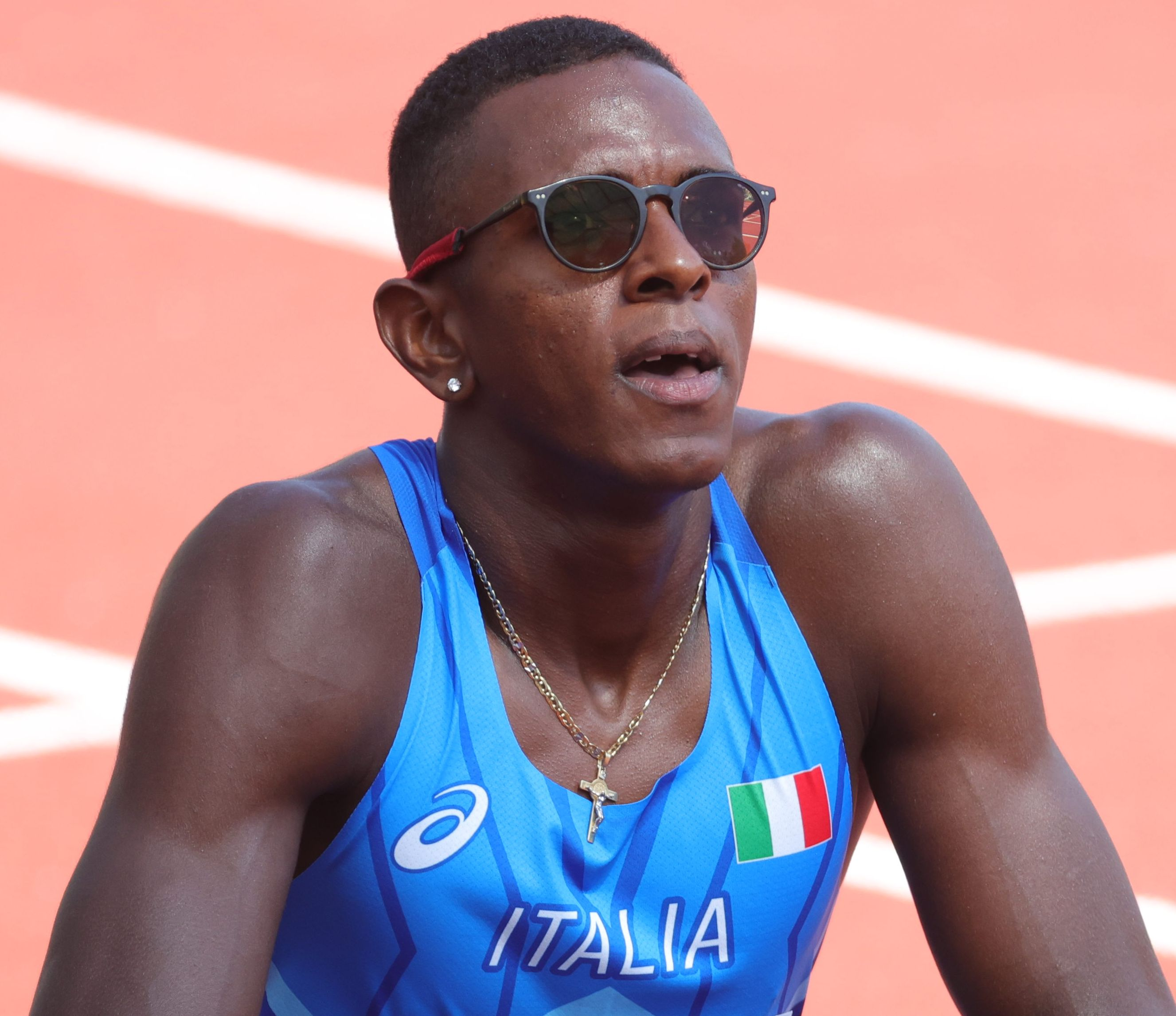
- Bencosme on the 2022 European Athletics Championships

Personal information
- Full name: José Reynaldo Bencosme de Leon
- Nickname: Negi
- Nationality: Italian
- Born: 16 May 1992 (age 34) Concepción de La Vega, Dominican Republic
- Height: 1.84 m (6 ft 0 in)
- Weight: 73 kg (161 lb)

Sport
- Country: Italy
- Sport: Athletics
- Event: 400 metres hurdles
- Club: G.S. Fiamme Azzurre; Atletica Cuneo; Fiamme Gialle
- Coached by: Luigi Catalfamo

Achievements and titles
- Personal bests: 200 m: 21.31 (2010); 400 m: 47.89 (2010); 400 m hs: 48.91 (2022)
Medal record
World Youth Championships
Bronze medal – third place	2009 Brixen	400 m hs
European Junior Championships
Bronze medal – third place	2011 Tallinn	400 m hs

José Reynaldo Bencosme de Leon (16 May 1992) is an Italian 400m hurdler of Dominican descent, a semifinalist at the 2012 Summer Olympics.

== Biography ==
Of Dominican and later acquired Italian citizenship, born in Concepción de La Vega, he arrived in Italy from the Dominican Republic with his mother, obtaining Italian citizenship in January 2009.

== Personal bests ==
- 200 metres: 21.31 ( (Italy) Fossano, 9 May 2010)
- 400 metres: 47.89 ( (Italy) Mondovì, 2 June 2010)
- 400 metres hurdles: 48.91 ( (Algeria) Oran, 1 July 2022)

== Achievements ==
Youth level

Year	Competition	Venue	Position	Event	Performance	Notes
2009	World Youth Championships	(Italy) Brixen	3rd	400 m hs	51.74	
2009	EYOF	(Finland) Tampere	2nd	400 m hs	52.27	
2009	Gymnasiade	(Qatar) Doha	1st	400 m hs	51.76	
2010	World Junior Championships	(Canada) Moncton	12th (sf)	400m hurdles	52.15	
2010	World Junior Championships	(Canada) Moncton	14th (h)	4 × 400 m relay	3:12.32	
2011	European Junior Championships	(Estonia) Tallinn	3rd	400 m hs	50.30	PB

Senior level

Year	Competition	Venue	Position	Event	Performance	Notes
2012	European Championships	(Finland) Helsinki	Semi-Finals	400 m hs	DSQ	
2012	Olympic Games	(United Kingdom) London	Semi-Finals	400 metres hurdles	50.07	
2017	World Championships	(United Kingdom) London	16th (sf)	400 m hurdles	50.29	
2022	Mediterranean Games	(Algeria) Oran	4th	400 m hurdles	48.91	PB

== National titles ==
He won four national championships.

- Italian Athletics Championships
  - 400 metres hurdles: 2011, 2012, 2016, 2018

== See also ==
- Italian all-time lists - 400 metres hurdles
