= 2016 African Championships in Athletics – Men's 400 metres hurdles =

The men's 400 metres hurdles event at the 2016 African Championships in Athletics was held on 23 and 24 June in Kings Park Stadium.

== Medalists ==
Gold	Silver	Bronze
Boniface Mucheru Tumuti; Kenya	Amadou Ndiaye; Senegal	Haron Koech; Kenya

== Results ==
=== Heats ===
Qualification: First 2 of each heat (Q) and the next 2 fastest (q) qualified for the final.

Rank	Heat	Name	Nationality	Time	Notes
1	2	Amadou Ndiaye	Senegal	49.74	Q
2	1	Boniface Mucheru Tumuti	Kenya	49.78	Q
3	1	LJ van Zyl	South Africa	49.94	Q
3	2	Cornel Fredericks	South Africa	49.94	Q
5	2	Haron Koech	Kenya	50.34	q
6	2	Miles Ukaoma	Nigeria	50.79	q
7	3	Jordin Andrade	Cape Verde	51.22	Q
8	2	Hardus Maritz	Namibia	51.24	
9	2	Creve Machava	Mozambique	51.62	
10	3	Kiprono Koskei	Kenya	52.03	Q
11	3	Larona Obakwe Thabe	Botswana	53.94	
12	1	Gatkuoth Chol	South Sudan	55.88	
13	3	Roy Zakaria	Zimbabwe	55.97	
	1	Kurt Couto	Mozambique	DQ	
	1	Maoulida Darouèche	Comoros	DNS	
	1	Ziem Esau Somda	Burkina Faso	DNS	
	3	Abdelmalik Lahoulou	Algeria	DNS	
	3	Lindsay Hanekom	South Africa	DNS	

=== Final ===
Rank	Lane	Athlete	Nationality	Time	Notes
1st place, gold medalist(s)	3	Boniface Mucheru Tumuti	Kenya	49.21	
2nd place, silver medalist(s)	4	Amadou Ndiaye	Senegal	49.41	
3rd place, bronze medalist(s)	2	Haron Koech	Kenya	49.41	
4	8	LJ van Zyl	South Africa	49.46	
5	5	Jordin Andrade	Cape Verde	49.62	
6	6	Cornel Fredericks	South Africa	49.82	
7	7	Kiprono Koskei	Kenya	51.77	
	1	Miles Ukaoma	Nigeria	DQ	
