= Aron Koech =

Kenyan hurdler (born 1990)

Aron Kipchumba Koech
Personal information
- Born: 27 January 1990 (age 36) Uasin Gishu County, Kenya
- Height: 1.90 m (6 ft 3 in)
- Weight: 76 kg (168 lb)

Sport
- Country: Kenya
- Sport: Athletics
- Event: 400 metres hurdles
- Club: Kenya Police
- Coached by: Vincent Mumo
Medal record
Men's athletics
Representing Kenya
African Championships
Gold medal – first place	2018 Asaba	4×400 m
Silver medal – second place	2016 Durban	4×400 m
Bronze medal – third place	2016 Durban	400 m hurdles
- Updated on 27 August 2016

Aron Kipchumba Koech (also known as Haron Koech; born 27 January 1990) is a Kenyan hurdler. At the 2015 Athletics Kenya World Championship Trials he finished third in the 400 metres hurdles event. Later that year he represented Kenya in the 400 metres hurdles event at the 2015 World Championships in Athletics in Beijing, China. With a personal best, in a time of 49.38, he finished 22nd in the heats. He was qualified for the semi-finals where he finished 19th in a time of 49.54. Again in 2016 he finished third at the 2016 Athletics Kenya Olympic Trials behind his brother and Boniface Mucheru Tumuti. At the Olympics, Koech made the final while his brother was disqualified in the heats. Tumuti went on to capture the silver medal in National Record time, while Koech finished seventh. His 48.49 in the semi-final round is his personal record.

His late twin brother, Nicholas Bett, was also a 400 metres hurdler.

== International competitions ==
Year	Competition	Venue	Position	Event	Notes
Representing Kenya
2015	World Championships	Beijing, China	19th (sf)	400 m hurdles	49.54
2016	African Championships	Durban, South Africa	3rd	400 m hurdles	49.41
2016	African Championships	Durban, South Africa	2nd	4 × 400 m relay	3:04.25
2016	Olympic Games	Rio de Janeiro, Brazil	7th	400 m hurdles	49.09
2017	World Championships	London, United Kingdom	18th (sf)	400 m hurdles	50.40
2018	Commonwealth Games	Gold Coast, Australia	6th	400 m hurdles	50.02
2018	Commonwealth Games	Gold Coast, Australia	3rd	4 × 400 m relay	DQ
2018	African Championships	Asaba, Nigeria	4th	400 m hurdles	49.94
2018	African Championships	Asaba, Nigeria	1st	4 × 400 m relay	3:00.92
2019	African Games	Rabat, Morocco	6th	400 m hurdles	50.58
2019	African Games	Rabat, Morocco	4th	4 × 400 m relay	3:05.71
