= PC Beneke =

South African hurdler

Personal information
- Full name: Pieter Christiaan Beneke
- Born: 18 July 1990 (age 35)
- Education: University of Pretoria
- Height: 1.88 m (6 ft 2 in)
- Weight: 80 kg (176 lb)

Sport
- Sport: Athletics
- Event: 400 metres hurdles
Medal record
Men's athletics
Representing South Africa
African Championships
Silver medal – second place	2012 Porto-Novo	4×400 m

Pieter Christiaan "PC" Beneke (born 18 July 1990) is a South African athlete specialising in the 400 metres hurdles. He represented his country at the 2013 World Championships without reaching the semifinals.

His personal best in the event is 49.18 seconds set in Stellenbosch in 2013.

He is married to a South African long jumper, Lynique Prinsloo.

== International competitions ==
Year	Competition	Venue	Position	Event	Notes
Representing South Africa
2007	World Youth Championships	Ostrava, Czech Republic	8th	400 m hurdles (84 cm)	51.93
2008	World Junior Championships	Bydgoszcz, Poland	5th	400 m hurdles	50.78
2008	World Junior Championships	Bydgoszcz, Poland	17th (h)	4 × 400 m relay	3:12.09
2011	Universiade	Shenzhen, China	12th (sf)	400 m hurdles	50.82
2011	Universiade	Shenzhen, China	3rd	4 × 400 m relay	3:05.61
2012	African Championships	Porto-Novo, Benin	11th (h)	400 m hurdles	51.87
2012	African Championships	Porto-Novo, Benin	2nd	4 × 400 m relay	3:04.01
2013	Universiade	Kazan, Russia	8th	400 m hurdles	50.51
2013	Universiade	Kazan, Russia	3rd	4 × 400 m relay	3:06.19
2013	World Championships	Moscow, Russia	31st (h)	400 m hurdles	51.14
