= Artur Terezan =

Brazilian hurdler

Personal information
- Full name: Artur Langowski Terezan
- Born: 8 May 1991 (age 35)
- Education: State University of Maringá
- Height: 1.87 m (6 ft 2 in)
- Weight: 79 kg (174 lb)

Sport
- Sport: Athletics
- Event: 400 metres hurdles
- Club: Associação de Atletismo de Maringá; FECAM

Artur Langowski Terezan (born 8 May 1991) is a Brazilian athlete specialising in the 400 metres hurdles. He finished fourth at the 2015 Summer Universiade.

His personal best in the event is 49.18 seconds achieved in Bragança Paulista in 2018.

== International competitions ==
Year	Competition	Venue	Position	Event	Notes
Representing Brazil
2008	South American Youth Championships	Lima, Peru	2nd	400 m hurdles (84 cm)	53.94
2013	South American Championships	Cartagena, Colombia	6th	400 m hurdles	52.30
2014	South American Games	Santiago, Chile	5th	400 m hurdles	52.45
2014	Ibero-American Championships	São Paulo, Brazil	7th	400 m hurdles	50.74
2015	Universiade	Gwangju, South Korea	4th	400 m hurdles	49.73
2017	Universiade	Naples, Italy	20th (sf)	400 m hurdles	51.89
2017	Universiade	Naples, Italy	15th (h)	4 × 400 m relay	3:15.27
2019	World Championships	Doha, Qatar	34th (h)	400 m hurdles	51.52
2021	South American Championships	Guayaquil, Ecuador	1st (h)	400 m hurdles	50.97^{1}

^{1}Did not start in the final
