= Amadou Ndiaye =

Senegalese hurdler (born 1992)

Personal information
- Nationality: Senegal
- Born: 6 December 1992 (age 33)
- Height: 1.80 m (5 ft 11 in)
- Weight: 80 kg (176 lb)

Sport
- Sport: Athletics
- Event: 400 m hurdles
Medal record
Men's athletics
Representing Senegal
African Championships
Silver medal – second place	2016 Durban	400 m hurdles
Summer Universiade
Silver medal – second place	2013 Kazan	400m hurdles
- Updated on 27 August 2016

Amadou Ndiaye (born 6 December 1992) is a Senegalese athlete specialsing in the 400 metres hurdles. He won the silver at the 2013 Summer Universiade.

His personal best in the event is 49.41 seconds set in Durban in 2016.

== Competition record ==
Year	Competition	Venue	Position	Event	Notes
Representing Senegal
2009	World Youth Championships	Brixen, Italy	7th	400 m hurdles (84 cm)	52.66
2009	African Junior Championships	Bambous, Mauritius	2nd	400 m hurdles	52.44
2010	World Junior Championships	Moncton, Canada	23rd (sf)	400 m hurdles	54.40
2010	African Championships	Nairobi, Kenya	5th	4 × 400 m relay	3:08.94
2011	African Junior Championships	Gaborone, Botswana	2nd	110 m hurdles (99 cm)	14.33
2011	Universiade	Shenzhen, China	42nd (h)	200 m	22.14
2012	African Championships	Porto-Novo, Benin	14th (h)	400 m hurdles	52.73
2013	Universiade	Kazan, Russia	2nd	400 m hurdles	49.90
2013	Jeux de la Francophonie	Nice, France	6th	400 m hurdles	51.88
2014	African Championships	Marrakesh, Morocco	9th (h)	400 m hurdles	50.96
2014	African Championships	Marrakesh, Morocco	7th	4 × 100 m relay	40.50
2015	Universiade	Gwangju, South Korea	8th	400 m hurdles	51.48
2015	World Championships	Beijing, China	39th (h)	400 m hurdles	52.40
2016	African Championships	Durban, South Africa	2nd	400 m hurdles	49.41
2016	Olympic Games	Rio de Janeiro, Brazil	34th (h)	400 m hurdles	49.91
2017	Islamic Solidarity Games	Baku, Azerbaijan	2nd	400 m hurdles	50.94
2017	Jeux de la Francophonie	Nice, France	2nd	400 m hurdles	50.17
2017	Jeux de la Francophonie	Nice, France	2nd	4 × 400 m relay	3:10.98
