= Amaurys Valle =

Cuban hurdler (born 1990)

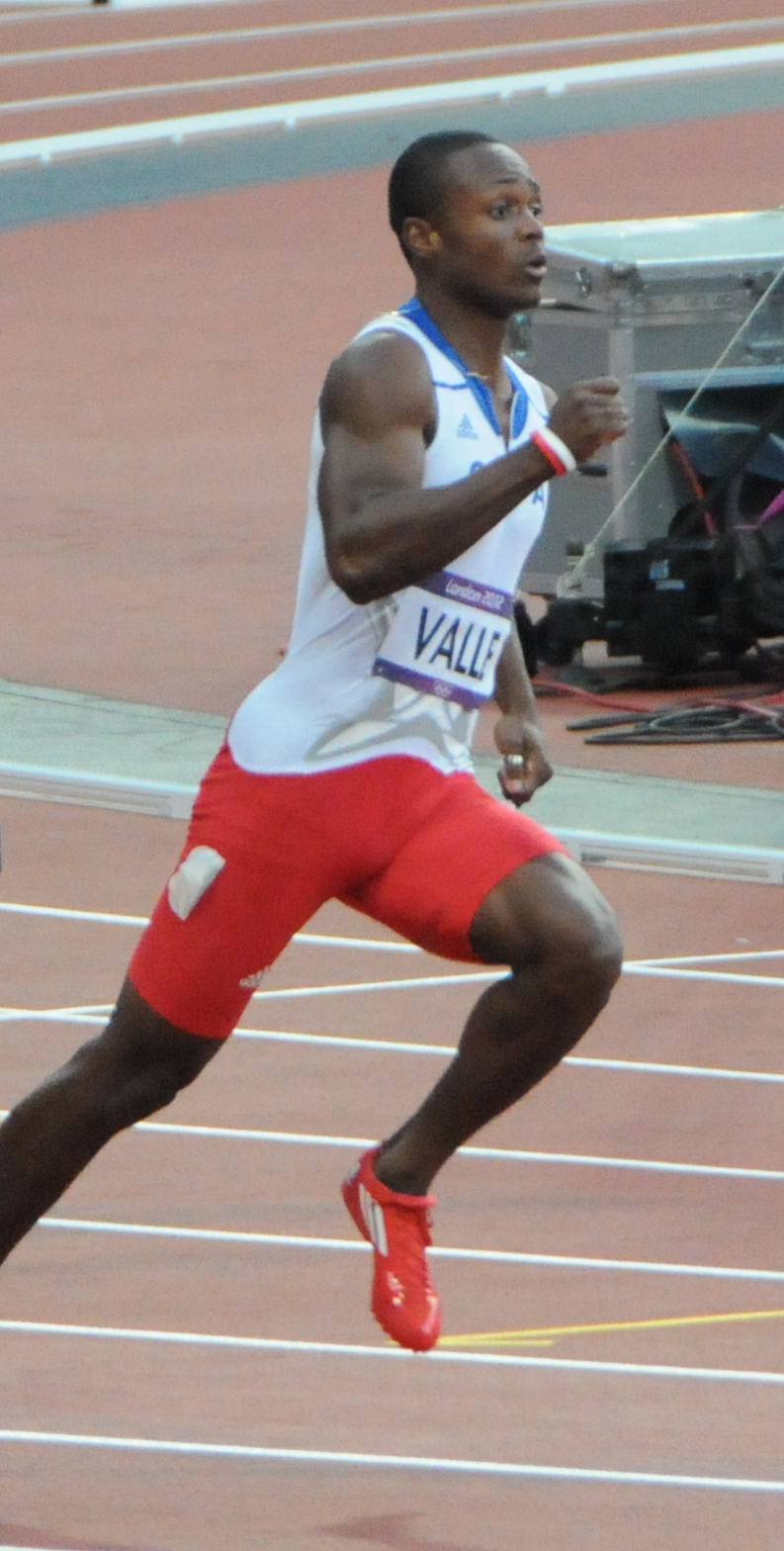
- Amaurys Valle at the 2012 Summer Olympics

Personal information
- Full name: Amaurys Raúl Valle Mencia
- Born: 18 January 1990 (age 36) Sancti Spíritus

Sport
- Country: Cuba
- Sport: Athletics
- Event: 400m Hurdles
Medal record
Pan American Games
Gold medal – first place	2011 Guadalajara	4×400 m relay
CAC Championships
Bronze medal – third place	2013 Morelia	400 m hurdles
Ibero-American Championships
Silver medal – second place	2012 Barquisimeto	400 m hurdles
- Updated on 24 January 2015

Amaurys Raúl Valle Mencia (born 18 January 1990) is a Cuban track and field athlete who competes in the 400 metres hurdles. His personal best for the event is 49.22 seconds, set in 2012.

Born in Sancti Spíritus, Valle emerged through the younger age category events, starting with a bronze medal at the 2007 World Youth Championships in Athletics, and then another bronze at the 2008 World Junior Championships in Athletics with a national junior record of 49.56 seconds. He competed sparingly in 2009 and 2010, but returned to the international scene a year later.

He won the 400 m hurdles at the 2011 ALBA Games and was also part of Cuba's silver medal-winning 4×400 metres relay team. He was chosen to compete for Cuba at the 2011 Pan American Games and although he was eliminated in the hurdles, he helped the Cuban relay team reach the final, where it won the gold medal after Valle was swapped for fellow hurdler Omar Cisneros. Valle beat Cisneros at the 2012 IAAF Centenary meet in Havana, setting a personal best of 49.22 seconds to finally improve upon his time from 2008. This gained him the qualifying standard for the 2012 London Olympics and he was later selected for the Cuban Olympic team. He placed 1st in the 1st Heat but was eliminated in the Semi-Finals of the 400m Male Hurdles. He dipped under fifty seconds again at the 2012 Ibero-American Championships in Athletics, where his run was enough for a silver medal behind Puerto Rico's Eric Alejandro.

== Personal bests ==
- 400 m: 47.12 s – Havana, Cuba, 8 June 2013
- 400 m hurdles: 49.19 s – London, United Kingdom, 3 August 2012

== Achievements ==
Year	Competition	Venue	Position	Event	Notes
2007	World Youth Championships	Ostrava, Czech Republic	3rd	400 m hurdles (84.0 cm)	50.37 s
2008	World Junior Championships	Bydgoszcz, Poland	3rd	400 m hurdles	49.56 s
2011	ALBA Games	Barquisimeto, Venezuela	1st	400 m hurdles	51.38 s
2011	ALBA Games	Barquisimeto, Venezuela	2nd	4 × 400 m relay	3:05.73 min
2011	Pan American Games	Guadalajara, Mexico	5th (h)	400 m hurdles	51.29 s A
2011	Pan American Games	Guadalajara, Mexico	1st^{1}	4 × 400 m relay	3:04.33 min^{1} A
2012	Ibero-American Championships	Barquisimeto, Venezuela	2nd	400 m hurdles	49.69 s
2012	Olympic Games	London, United Kingdom	7th (sf)	400 m hurdles	50.48 s
2013	Central American and Caribbean Championships	Morelia, Mexico	3rd	400m hurdles	50.02 A
2014	Pan American Sports Festival	Mexico City, Mexico	6th	400m hurdles	52.21 A

^{1}: Competed only in the heat.
