= 2012 African Championships in Athletics – Men's 400 metres hurdles =

2012 African Championship men's 400 m hurdles

The men's 400 metres hurdles at the 2012 African Championships in Athletics was held at the Stade Charles de Gaulle on 28 and 29 June.

== Medalists ==
Gold	Amaechi Morton; Nigeria
Silver	Mamadou Kasse Hanne; Senegal
Bronze	Boniface Mucheru; Kenya

== Records ==
Standing records prior to the 2012 African Championships in Athletics
World record	Kevin Young (USA)	46.78	Barcelona, Spain	6 August 1992
African record	Samuel Matete (ZAM)	47.10	Zürich, Switzerland	7 August 1991
Championship record	Amadou Dia Ba (SEN)	48.29	Cairo, Egypt	1985

== Schedule ==
Date	Time	Round
28 June 2012	17:00	Round 1
29 June 2012	16:10	Final

== Results ==
=== Round 1 ===
First 2 in each heat (Q) and 2 best performers (q) advance to the Final.

Rank	Heat	Lane	Name	Nationality	Time	Note
1	1	3	Mamadou Kasse Hanne	Senegal	49.86	Q
2	2	3	Amaechi Morton	Nigeria	50.10	Q
3	1	4	Kurt Couto	Mozambique	50.20	Q
4	3	4	Boniface Mucheru	Kenya	50.51	Q
5	2	4	Vincent Kiplangat Koskei	Kenya	50.75	Q
6	1	7	Christopher Ngetich	Kenya	50.79	q
7	3	2	Mohamed Sghaier	Tunisia	50.90	Q
8	3	3	L. J. van Zyl	South Africa	51.14	q
9	1	2	Zied Azizi	Tunisia	51.25	
10	1	6	Hussein Hafiz	Sudan	51.66	
11	2	7	PC Beneke	South Africa	51.87	
12	1	5	Akobuntu Ikwamikow	Nigeria	52.19	
13	2	5	Philippe Djaovazaha	Madagascar	52.38	
14	3	6	Amadou Ndiaye	Senegal	52.73	
15	3	5	Lankantien Lamboni	Togo	53.99	
16	1	8	Hadama Bagayogo	Mali	55.36	
17	2	2	Raoul Idohou	Benin	57.46	
	2	8	Barnabé Bationo	Burkina Faso	DNS	
	2	6	Robert Dwumfuor	Ghana	DNS	
	2	6	Maoulida Darouèche	Comoros	DNS	

=== Final ===
Rank	Lane	Name	Nationality	Time	Note
1st place, gold medalist(s)	3	Amaechi Morton	Nigeria	49.32	
2nd place, silver medalist(s)	6	Mamadou Kasse Hanne	Senegal	49.39	
3rd place, bronze medalist(s)	5	Boniface Mucheru	Kenya	49.45	
4	8	Vincent Kiplangat Koskei	Kenya	50.31	
5	7	Mohamed Sghaier	Tunisia	50.37	
6	2	Christopher Ngetich	Kenya	50.46	
7	1	Kurt Couto	Mozambique	1:09.53	
	1	L. J. van Zyl	South Africa	DNF	
