= Athletics at the 2015 Pan American Games – Men's 400 metres hurdles =

Men's 400 metres hurdles at the 2015 Pan American Games
- Venue: CIBC Pan Am and Parapan Am Athletics Stadium
- Dates: July 22 - July 23
- Competitors: 22 from 16 nations
- Winning time: 48.51

Medalists
Gold medal	Jeffery Gibson	Bahamas
Silver medal	Javier Culson	Puerto Rico
Bronze medal	Roxroy Cato	Jamaica

The men's 400 metres hurdles sprint competition of the athletics events at the 2015 Pan American Games will take place between July 23 and July 24 at the CIBC Pan Am and Parapan Am Athletics Stadium in Toronto, Canada. The defending Pan American Games champion is Omar Cisneros of Cuba.

== Records ==
Prior to this competition, the existing world and Pan American Games records were as follows:

World record	Kevin Young (USA)	46.76	Barcelona, Spain	August 6, 1992
Pan American Games record	Omar Cisneros (CUB)	47.99	Guadalajara, Mexico	October 27, 2011

== Qualification ==
Each National Olympic Committee (NOC) was able to enter up to two entrants providing they had met the minimum standard (51.62) in the qualifying period (January 1, 2014 to June 28, 2015).

== Schedule ==
Date	Time	Round
July 22, 2015	12:20	Heats
July 23, 2015	17:40	Final

== Results ==
All times shown are in seconds.

KEY:	q	Fastest non-qualifiers	Q	Qualified	NR	National record	PB	Personal best	SB	Seasonal best	DQ	Disqualified

=== Heats ===
Rank	Heat	Name	Nationality	Time	Notes
1	1	Jeshua Anderson	United States	49.73	Q
2	1	Roxroy Cato	Jamaica	49.85	Q
3	1	Andrés Silva	Uruguay	50.02	q
4	1	Mahau Suguimati	Brazil	50.29	q
5	2	Leford Green	Jamaica	50.51	Q
6	2	Javier Culson	Puerto Rico	50.54	Q
7	3	Kerron Clement	United States	50.63	Q
8	3	Jeffery Gibson	Bahamas	50.74	Q
9	2	Emanuel Mayers	Trinidad and Tobago	50.81	
10	3	Hederson Estefani	Brazil	51.06	
11	3	Félix Sánchez	Dominican Republic	51.07	
12	3	Eric Alejandro	Puerto Rico	51.32	
13	3	Jose Luis Gaspar	Cuba	51.71	
14	2	Juander Santos	Dominican Republic	52.16	
15	1	Gregory MacNeill	Canada	52.31	
16	1	Alfredo Sepulveda	Chile	52.32	
17	2	Lucirio Francisco Garrido	Venezuela	52.42	
18	2	Gerber Blanco	Guatemala	52.74	
19	3	Tait Nystuen	Canada	52.98	
20	1	Sergio Rios	Mexico	53.37	
21	2	Gerald Drummond	Costa Rica	53.47	
	1	Leslie Murray	Virgin Islands	DNF	

=== Final ===
Rank	Name	Nationality	Time	Notes
1st place, gold medalist(s)	Jeffery Gibson	Bahamas	48.51	NR
2nd place, silver medalist(s)	Javier Culson	Puerto Rico	48.67	
3rd place, bronze medalist(s)	Roxroy Cato	Jamaica	48.72	SB
4	Kerron Clement	United States	48.72	
5	Jeshua Anderson	United States	48.95	SB
6	Leford Green	Jamaica	49.42	
7	Andrés Silva	Uruguay	49.48	
8	Mahau Suguimati	Brazil	49.68	
