= Athletics at the 2018 Commonwealth Games – Men's 400 metres hurdles =

Men's 400 metres hurdles at the 2018 Commonwealth Games
- Venue: Carrara Stadium
- Dates: 10 April (heats); 12 April (final)
- Competitors: 22 from 14 nations
- Winning time: 48.25

Medalists
gold medal	Kyron McMaster	British Virgin Islands
silver medal	Jeffery Gibson	Bahamas
bronze medal	Jaheel Hyde	Jamaica

The men's 400 metres hurdles at the 2018 Commonwealth Games, as part of the athletics programme, took place in the Carrara Stadium on 10 and 12 April 2018.

Kyron McMaster won the first ever Commonwealth Games gold medal for the British Virgin Islands. His victory followed severe disruption of his life, as his coach Xavier Samuels had died the previous year during Hurricane Irma.

== Records ==
Prior to this competition, the existing world and Games records were as follows:

World record	Kevin Young (USA)	46.78	Barcelona, Spain	6 August 1992
Games record	L. J. van Zyl (RSA)	48.05	Melbourne, Australia	23 March 2006

== Schedule ==
The schedule was as follows:

Date	Time	Round
Tuesday 10 April 2018	11:15	First round
Thursday 12 April 2018	19:45	Final

All times are Australian Eastern Standard Time (UTC+10)

== Results ==
=== First round ===
The first round consisted of three heats. The two fastest competitors per heat (plus two fastest losers) advanced to the final.

Heat 1

Rank	Lane	Name	Reaction Time	Result	Notes	Qual.
1	8	Kyron McMaster (IVB)	0.170	48.78		Q
2	4	Andre Clarke (JAM)	0.160	49.10	PB	Q
3	7	Kurt Couto (MOZ)	0.145	49.56	SB	
4	2	Constant Pretorius (RSA)	0.161	49.71		
5	5	Ayyasamy Dharun (IND)	0.162	49.85		
6	3	William Mbevi Mutunga (KEN)	0.202	50.92		
7	6	Henry Okorie (NGR)	0.204	52.14		

Heat 2

Rank	Lane	Name	Reaction Time	Result	Notes	Qual.
1	5	Jaheel Hyde (JAM)	0.149	49.14		Q
2	6	Jack Green (ENG)	0.194	49.24		Q
3	2	Aron Koech (KEN)	0.144	49.28	SB	q
4	4	Mohamed Rilwan Alowonle (NGR)	0.205	49.49	PB; R 162.5b	q
5	7	Johannes Maritz (NAM)	0.154	50.41		
6	1	Cameron French (NZL)	0.172	50.60		
7	3	Alastair Chalmers (GUE)	0.169	51.10	PB	
8	8	Mowen Boino (PNG)	0.178	51.61	SB	

Heat 3

Rank	Lane	Name	Reaction Time	Result	Notes	Qual.
1	4	Nicholas Bett (KEN)	0.330	49.24		Q
2	5	Jeffery Gibson (BAH)	0.173	49.75		Q
3	6	Ian Dewhurst (AUS)	0.179	49.84		
4	7	Ricardo Cunningham (JAM)	0.163	50.68		
5	8	L. J. van Zyl (RSA)	0.165	50.98		
6	2	Creve Armando Machava (MOZ)	0.196	51.60		
7	3	Ephraim Lerkin (PNG)	0.194	52.17		

=== Final ===
The medals were determined in the final.

Rank	Lane	Name	Reaction Time	Result	Notes
1st place, gold medalist(s)	5	Kyron McMaster (IVB)	0.156	48.25	
2nd place, silver medalist(s)	8	Jeffery Gibson (BAH)	0.146	49.10	SB
3rd place, bronze medalist(s)	3	Jaheel Hyde (JAM)	0.157	49.16	
4	7	Jack Green (ENG)	0.185	49.18	
5	2	Mohamed Rilwan Alowonle (NGR)	0.179	49.80	
6	1	Aron Koech (KEN)	0.168	50.02	
7	4	Andre Clarke (JAM)	0.179	50.08	
8	6	Nicholas Bett (KEN)	0.170	51.00	
