= 2008 World Junior Championships in Athletics – Men's 400 metres hurdles =

The men's 400 metres hurdles event at the 2008 World Junior Championships in Athletics was held in Bydgoszcz, Poland, at Zawisza Stadium on 9, 10 and 11 July.

== Medalists ==
Gold	Jeshua Anderson; United States
Silver	Johnny Dutch; United States
Bronze	Amaurys Valle; Cuba

== Results ==
=== Final ===
11 July

Rank	Name	Nationality	Time	Notes
1st place, gold medalist(s)	Jeshua Anderson	United States	48.68	
2nd place, silver medalist(s)	Johnny Dutch	United States	49.25	
3rd place, bronze medalist(s)	Amaurys Valle	Cuba	49.56	
4	Cornel Fredericks	South Africa	50.39	
5	PC Beneke	South Africa	50.78	
6	Taras Shcherenko	Israel	51.35	
7	John Kituu Wambua	Kenya	51.70	
8	David Gollnow	Germany	53.63	

=== Semifinals ===
10 July

==== Semifinal 1 ====
Rank	Name	Nationality	Time	Notes
1	Johnny Dutch	United States	50.40	Q
2	Amaurys Valle	Cuba	51.17	Q
3	PC Beneke	South Africa	51.46	q
4	David Gollnow	Germany	51.48	q
5	Kohei Tamemoto	Japan	51.89	
6	Valdas Valintelis	Lithuania	52.07	
7	Julius Oletygor	Kenya	52.14	
8	Emanuel Mayers	Trinidad and Tobago	52.39	

==== Semifinal 2 ====
Rank	Name	Nationality	Time	Notes
1	Jeshua Anderson	United States	49.90	Q
2	Taras Shcherenko	Israel	51.60	Q
3	Giacomo Panizza	Italy	51.73	
4	Sebastian Knorr	Germany	52.31	
5	Leslie Murray	U.S. Virgin Islands	52.51	
6	Adel Al-Nasser	Saudi Arabia	52.60	
7	Shane Brathwaite	Barbados	53.09	
	Nikita Andriyanov	Russia	DNS	

==== Semifinal 3 ====
Rank	Name	Nationality	Time	Notes
1	Cornel Fredericks	South Africa	51.11	Q
2	John Kituu Wambua	Kenya	51.51	Q
3	Tomoharu Kino	Japan	51.96	
4	Michał Pietrzak	Poland	52.22	
5	Jehue Gordon	Trinidad and Tobago	52.26	
6	Jassim Waleed Al-Mas	Kuwait	53.05	
7	Silvestras Guogis	Lithuania	53.46	
	Artyom Dyatlov	Uzbekistan	DQ	IAAF rule 163.3

=== Heats ===
9 July

==== Heat 1 ====
Rank	Name	Nationality	Time	Notes
1	Jeshua Anderson	United States	51.12	Q
2	Taras Shcherenko	Israel	51.44	Q
3	Shane Brathwaite	Barbados	51.66	Q
4	Jehue Gordon	Trinidad and Tobago	52.30	q
5	Jassim Waleed Al-Mas	Kuwait	52.43	q
6	Driss Sassi	Tunisia	53.97	
7	Victor Valentin	Puerto Rico	54.05	
8	Stephan Ender	Austria	54.55	

==== Heat 2 ====
Rank	Name	Nationality	Time	Notes
1	Tomoharu Kino	Japan	51.77	Q
2	John Kituu Wambua	Kenya	52.02	Q
3	Valdas Valintelis	Lithuania	52.83	Q
4	Hamada Al-Bishi	Saudi Arabia	53.61	
5	Tomasz Baranowski	Poland	53.85	
6	Jithin Paul	India	54.01	
7	René Claudio	Puerto Rico	54.51	
8	Chen Yu-Te	Chinese Taipei	55.57	

==== Heat 3 ====
Rank	Name	Nationality	Time	Notes
1	Johnny Dutch	United States	52.21	Q
2	David Gollnow	Germany	52.34	Q
3	Silvestras Guogis	Lithuania	52.48	Q
4	Julius Oletygor	Kenya	52.54	q
5	Fahad Faraj	Kuwait	53.40	
6	Aleksandr Korovka	Ukraine	53.94	
7	Nejmi Burnside	Bahamas	55.21	

==== Heat 4 ====
Rank	Name	Nationality	Time	Notes
1	Amaurys Valle	Cuba	51.67	Q
2	Cornel Fredericks	South Africa	51.96	Q
3	Kohei Tamemoto	Japan	52.05	Q
4	Nikita Andriyanov	Russia	52.14	q
5	Emanuel Mayers	Trinidad and Tobago	52.29	q
6	Leslie Murray	U.S. Virgin Islands	52.64	q
7	Tibor Koroknai	Hungary	53.33	
8	Kenneth Karosich	Guam	58.36	

==== Heat 5 ====
Rank	Name	Nationality	Time	Notes
1	Michał Pietrzak	Poland	51.89	Q
2	PC Beneke	South Africa	51.90	Q
3	Artyom Dyatlov	Uzbekistan	52.62	Q
4	Hugo Grillas	France	52.98	
5	Nathan Woodward	United Kingdom	53.42	
6	Faysal Mehdioui	Algeria	54.41	
7	Shejil Varghese	India	54.48	
8	Fernando Semedo	Cape Verde	61.09	

==== Heat 6 ====
Rank	Name	Nationality	Time	Notes
1	Giacomo Panizza	Italy	52.77	Q
2	Adel Al-Nasser	Saudi Arabia	52.84	Q
3	Sebastian Knorr	Germany	53.25	Q
4	Lyes Bouzid	Algeria	54.10	
5	Jeffery Gibson	Bahamas	54.37	
6	Shih Yu-Fan	Chinese Taipei	55.43	
7	Wilmer Valor	Venezuela	59.26	

== Participation ==
According to an unofficial count, 46 athletes from 31 countries participated in the event.

- Algeria (2)
- Austria (1)
- Bahamas (2)
- Barbados (1)
- Cape Verde (1)
- Chinese Taipei (2)
- Cuba (1)
- France (1)
- Germany (2)
- Guam (1)
- Hungary (1)
- India (2)
- Israel (1)
- Italy (1)
- Japan (2)
- Kenya (2)
- Kuwait (2)
- Lithuania (2)
- Poland (2)
- Puerto Rico (2)
- Russia (1)
- Saudi Arabia (2)
- South Africa (2)
- Trinidad and Tobago (2)
- Tunisia (1)
- Ukraine (1)
- United Kingdom (1)
- United States (2)
- U.S. Virgin Islands (1)
- Uzbekistan (1)
- Venezuela (1)
