= TJ Holmes (athlete) =

American athletics competitor

Timothy Lamont "TJ" Holmes (born July 2, 1995) is an American male track and field athlete who specializes in the 400-meter hurdles.

Born in St. Petersburg, Florida he attended Lakewood High School and took up hurdling while there. He went on to attend Baylor University, studying sports medicine.

He transferred to University of Florida for the start of the 2014/15 academic year back to his home state and joined the Florida Gators track and field. While at Baylor he was an NCAA finalist in the 400m hurdles and the 4 × 400-meter relay. Holmes also received a bronze medal at the 2014 World Junior Championships held in Eugene, Oregon. At Florida, he completed a hurdles 1–2 at the 2016 NCAA Outdoor Championships behind teammate Eric Futch.

Third place at the 2017 USA Outdoor Track and Field Championships led to his global senior debut at the 2017 World Championships in Athletics, where he finished in fifth place in a time of 49.00 seconds.

In 2018, Holmes made his debut on the professional circuit (placing 4th in each Diamond League race), which qualified him to compete in the Diamond League Final. Due to injury, he finished last and discontinued the rest of his season. After an amazing 2018 season, Holmes was ranked #1 in the U.S and #6 in the World, according to Track and Field News.

Holmes qualified for his 2nd World Championships Team in 2019, after placing 2nd at U.S Champs. Tj progressed his way to the finals, and placed Top 5 in the World once again.

In 2020-2021, Holmes dealt with many injuries (fractured sesamoid bone and a torn tendon on his right foot). While competing at the 2021 Track and Field Olympic Trials, he was injured in the semi-final round.

== International competitions ==
Year	Competition	Venue	Position	Event	Notes
2014	World Junior Championships	Eugene, United States	3rd	400 m hurdles	50.07
2017	World Championships	London, United Kingdom	5th	400 m hurdles	49.00
2018	NACAC Championships	Toronto, Canada	5th	400 m hurdles	49.79
2019	World Championships	Doha, Qatar	5th	400 m hurdles	48.20
