= Cristian Morton =

American-Nigerian track and field hurdler

Personal information
- Born: October 30, 1989 (age 36) Atlanta, Georgia, U.S

Sport
- Country: Nigeria
- Sport: Athletics
- Event: 400m Hurdles
Medal record
Men's athletics
Representing Nigeria
African Championships
Gold medal – first place	2012 Porto-Novo	400 m hurdles
Gold medal – first place	2012 Porto-Novo	4×400 m
Silver medal – second place	2014 Marrakesh	400 m hurdles
Silver medal – second place	2014 Marrakesh	4×400 m

Cristian Amaechi Cuevas Morton (born October 30, 1989) is an American-born track and field 400-meter hurdler who competes for Nigeria. He was the 2012 400 m hurdles gold medallist at the NCAA Championships and the African Championships. He has a personal record of 48.79 seconds for the event.

Morton was born in Atlanta, Georgia to a Nigerian mother, Nkem Sabena Obiekwe. He holds dual American/Nigerian citizenship. He attended Riverwood High School and while there he broke the school records in the 400 m hurdles and the 400-meter dash, as well as finishing second at the 2008 USATF Junior Olympics. He gained an athletic scholarship at Stanford University and began competing for the Stanford Cardinal in 2009.

Responding to the advice of Patience Itanyi (a Nigerian Olympian), Morton opted to compete internationally for his mother's native Nigeria. In his first year at Stanford, he ran a personal best of 50.11 seconds for the 400 m hurdles, breaking the school's 28-year-old record. He came third at the Pac-10 Conference final and was a semi-finalist at the NCAA Championships. In July, he travelled to Nigeria and came second in the 400 m dash at the national trials (running a best of 46.10 seconds). He was chosen for the 4×400-meter relay team and helped Nigeria reach the 2009 World Championships final, where they finished eighth. Returning to collegiate competition in 2010, he set a personal record of 48.94 seconds in the hurdles to finish second at the Pac-10 Championships, then earned his first All-American honours with a third-place finish at the NCAA Outdoors.

He set an indoor best of 46.23 seconds over 400 m in January 2011 and was fifth in that event at the NCAA Indoor Championships. He ran a time of 49.43 for third at the Pac-10 Championships and improved one position at the NCAA Outdoors, taking second place in a season's best of 49.08 seconds. The 2012 collegiate season saw Morton develop his skills further. He ran a near-personal record (48.95) to win the Pac-10 title and also came second in the 110-meter hurdles. He went undefeated in the 400 m hurdles for Stanford that year and won the NCAA title with a best of 48.79 seconds. Morton discussed his internationally eligibility with both the Athletics Federation of Nigeria and USA Track and Field. He requested to run for the United States and American officials asked for his release from Nigerian duty, but ultimately he continued to represent Nigeria. At the 2012 African Championships in Athletics he won the continental gold medals in both the 400 m hurdles and in the relay. Given that he had achieved the Olympic qualifying standard, he was selected to participate for Nigeria at the 2012 Summer Olympics.
