= Athletics at the 2019 African Games – Men's 400 metres hurdles =

The men's 400 metres hurdles event at the 2019 African Games was held on 28 and 29 August in Rabat.

== Medalists ==
Gold	Silver	Bronze
Abdelmalik Lahoulou; Algeria	Bienvenu Sawadogo; Burkina Faso	Mohamed Amine Touati; Tunisia

== Results ==
=== Heats ===
Qualification: First 2 in each heat (Q) and the next 2 fastest (q) advanced to the final.

Rank	Heat	Name	Nationality	Time	Notes
1	1	Creve Armando Machava	Mozambique	49.54	Q
2	1	Bienvenu Sawadogo	Burkina Faso	49.70	Q, NR
3	1	Aron Kipchumba Koech	Kenya	49.73	q
4	3	Abdelmalik Lahoulou	Algeria	50.03	Q
5	3	Mohamed Amine Touati	Tunisia	50.19	Q
6	2	Lindsay Hanekom	South Africa	50.36	Q
7	3	Rilwan Alowonle	Nigeria	50.77	q
8	1	Ned Azemia	Seychelles	50.81	
9	3	William Mbevi Mutunga	Kenya	51.28	
10	1	Derese Tesfaye	Ethiopia	51.41	
11	3	Jordin Andrade	Cape Verde	51.65	
12	1	Timothy Emeoghene	Nigeria	51.85	
13	2	Edward Ngunjiri	Kenya	52.45	Q
14	2	Kemorena Tisang	Botswana	53.63	
15	2	Akoon Akoon	South Sudan	55.88	
	2	Norman Mukwada	Zimbabwe	DQ	
	3	Sokwakhana Zazini	South Africa	DQ	
	3	Oumar Babou	Senegal	DNF	
	2	Gadisa Bayu	Ethiopia	DNS	

=== Final ===
Rank	Lane	Name	Nationality	Time	Notes
1st place, gold medalist(s)	6	Abdelmalik Lahoulou	Algeria	49.08	
2nd place, silver medalist(s)	4	Bienvenu Sawadogo	Burkina Faso	49.25	NR
3rd place, bronze medalist(s)	7	Mohamed Amine Touati	Tunisia	49.29	
4	1	Rilwan Alowonle	Nigeria	49.42	
5	3	Lindsay Hanekom	South Africa	49.98	
6	2	Aron Kipchumba Koech	Kenya	50.58	
7	8	Edward Ngunjiri	Kenya	51.75	
	5	Creve Armando Machava	Mozambique	DNF	
