= Halit Kılıç =

Turkish sprinter

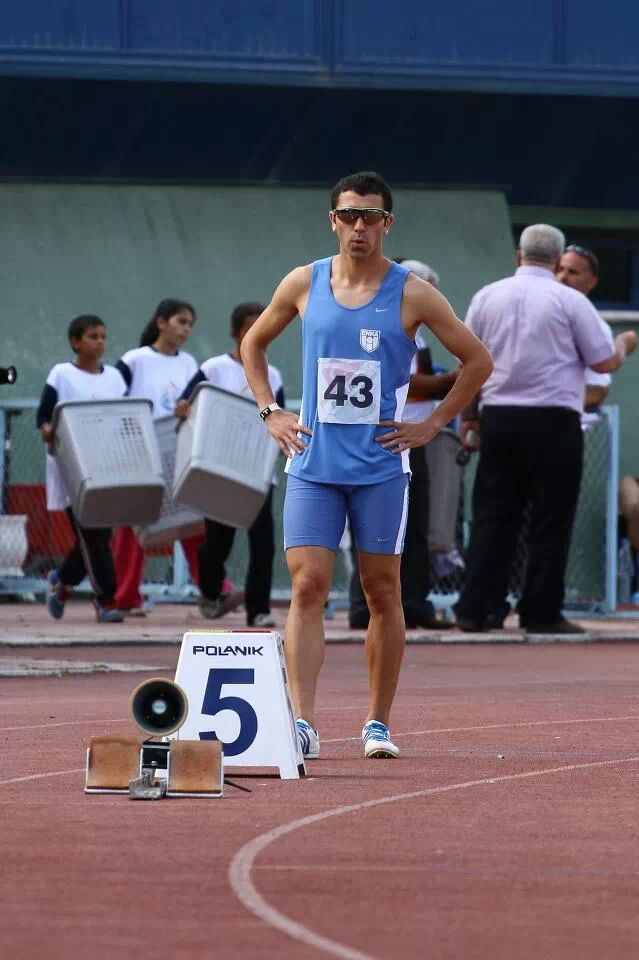
- Halit Kiliç in 2012

Personal information
- Born: 1 March 1992 (age 33) Mardin, Turkey
- Education: Aksaray University
- Height: 1.77 m (5 ft 10 in)
- Weight: 66 kg (146 lb)

Sport
- Sport: Athletics
- Event(s): 400 m, 800 m

Halit Kılıç (born 1 March 1992 in Mardin) is a Turkish athlete competing in the 400 and 800 metres. He represented his country in the latter distance at the 2012 World Indoor Championships without advancing from the first round.

== International competitions ==
Year	Competition	Venue	Position	Event	Notes
Representing Turkey
2009	World Youth Championships	Brixen, Italy	–	400 m	DQ
2009	World Youth Championships	Brixen, Italy	12th (sf)	800 m	1:52.36
2009	World Youth Championships	Brixen, Italy	11th (h)	Medley relay	1:55.61
2009	European Youth Olympic Festival	Tampere, Finland	–	400 m	DNF
2009	European Youth Olympic Festival	Tampere, Finland	1st	800 m	1:55.79
2010	World Junior Championships	Moncton, Canada	16th (sf)	400 m	47.61
2010	World Junior Championships	Moncton, Canada	7th (sf)	800 m	1:48.63
2011	European Indoor Championships	Paris, France	24th (h)	800 m	1:53.33
2011	European Junior Championships	Tallinn, Estonia	4th	800 m	1:47.90
2012	World Indoor Championships	Istanbul, Turkey	25th (h)	800 m	1:54.06
2012	World Indoor Championships	Istanbul, Turkey	10th (h)	4 × 400 m relay	3:11.28
2012	European Championships	Helsinki, Finland	27th (h)	400 m	47.91
2012	European Championships	Helsinki, Finland	13th (h)	4 × 400 m relay	3:11.44
2013	European Indoor Championships	Gothenburg, Sweden	7th (h)	800 m	1:49.85
2013	Mediterranean Games	Mersin, Turkey	9th (h)	400 m	48.15
2013	Mediterranean Games	Mersin, Turkey	2nd	4 × 400 m relay	3:05.28
2013	Universiade	Kazan, Russia	3rd	4 × 400 m relay	3:06.36
2013	Islamic Solidarity Games	Palembang, Indonesia	5th	400 m	46.96
2013	Islamic Solidarity Games	Palembang, Indonesia	2nd	4 × 400 m relay	3:06.43
2014	European Championships	Zürich, Switzerland	12th (h)	4 × 400 m relay	3:07.68

== Personal bests ==
Outdoor

- 400 metres – 46.41 (Ankara 2011)
- 800 metres – 1:47.90 (Tallinn 2011)

Indoor

- 400 metres – 47.51 (Istanbul 2013)
- 800 metres – 1:49.80 (Vienna 2011)
