= Athletics at the 2016 Summer Olympics – Men's 400 metres hurdles =

Men's 400 metres hurdles at the Games of the XXXI Olympiad
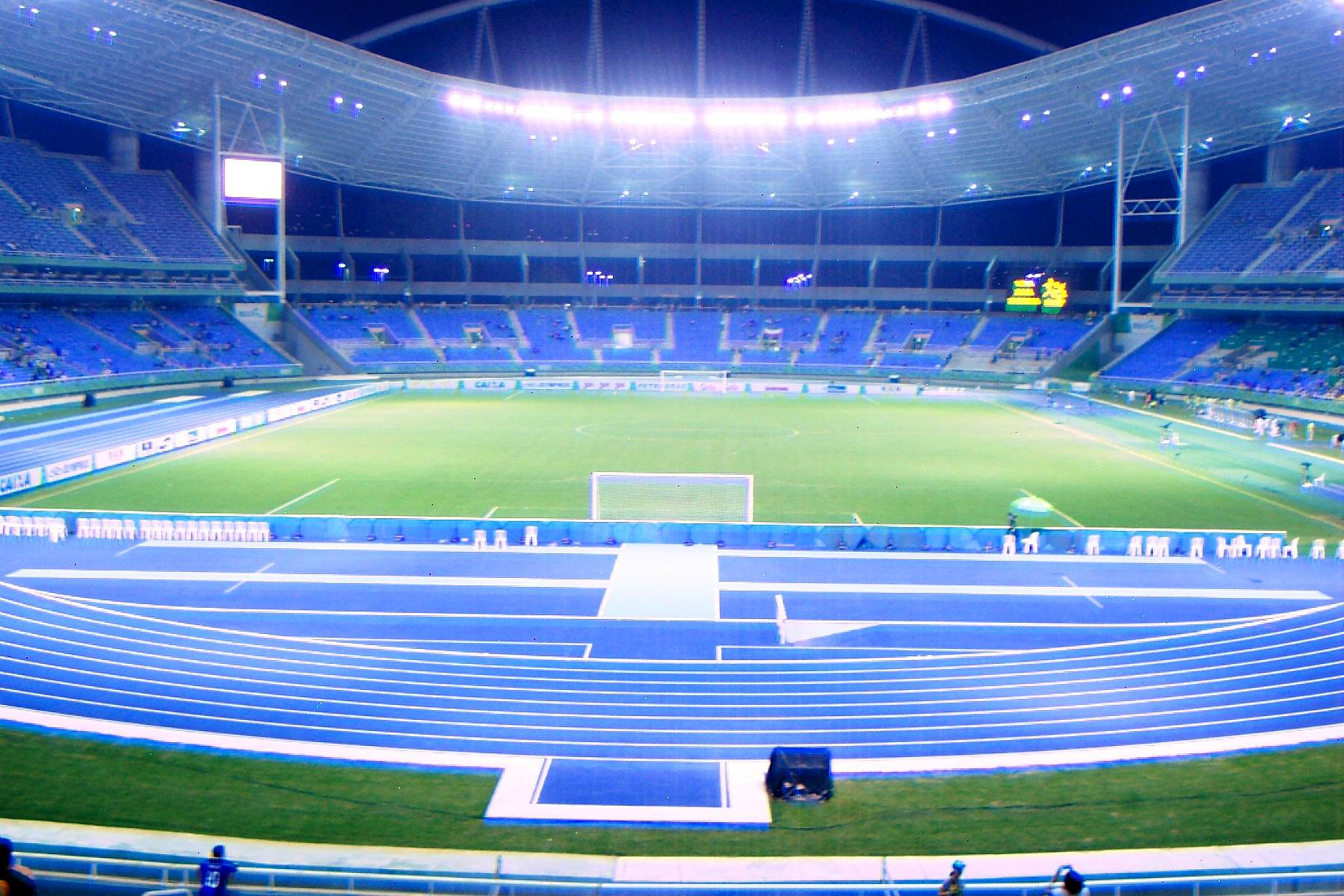
- Interior view of the Estádio Olímpico João Havelange, where the men's 400m hurdles took place.
- Venue: Estádio Olímpico João Havelange
- Dates: 15 August 2016 (quarterfinals); 16 August 2016 (semifinals); 18 August 2016 (final)
- Competitors: 47 from 33 nations
- Winning time: 47.73

Medalists
1st place, gold medalist(s)		Kerron Clement; United States
2nd place, silver medalist(s)		Boniface Mucheru Tumuti; Kenya
3rd place, bronze medalist(s)		Yasmani Copello; Turkey

The men's 400 metres hurdles event at the 2016 Summer Olympics took place between 15–18 August at the Olympic Stadium. There were 47 competitors from 33 nations. The event was won by Kerron Clement of the United States, the nation's 19th victory in the men's long hurdles. Clement (silver in 2008) became the ninth man to win multiple medals in the event. Both Kenya and Turkey earned their first medals in the men's 400 metres hurdles, the former with Boniface Mucheru Tumuti's silver and the latter with Yasmani Copello's bronze.

== Background ==
This was the 26th time the event was held. It had been introduced along with the men's 200 metres hurdles in 1900, with the 200 being dropped after 1904 and the 400 being held through 1908 before being left off the 1912 programme. However, when the Olympics returned in 1920 after World War I, the men's 400 metres hurdles was back and would continue to be contested at every Games thereafter.

There were several major absences from the competition: the 2012 Olympic champion Félix Sánchez did not return to defend his title as he had retired, Johnny Dutch (the world-leading athlete that season) had faltered at the American Olympic Trials, and the 2015 World Championships runner-up Denis Kudryavtsev was ineligible due to the Russian team ban for doping. The top contender was Kerron Clement – the 2008 Olympic silver medalist (and 2012 eighth-place finisher) showing a return of form to place second on the world rankings. The 2012 Olympic medalists Javier Culson of Puerto Rico (bronze) and American Michael Tinsley (silver) were other strong entrants, as was the 2016 European Champion Yasmani Copello of Turkey. Jehue Gordon of Trinidad and Tobago was another returning finalist from 2012. Nicholas Bett (Kenya's reigning world champion) was present but ranked outside the world's top forty.

Algeria and Cape Verde each made their debut in the event. The United States made its 25th appearance, most of any nation, having missed only the boycotted 1980 Games.

== Summary ==
The final started with a false start. Javier Culson realized his mistake and walked off the track in tears before the disqualification card could be shown to him. On the restart, Yasmani Copello, the Cuban free agent running for Turkey in lane 2 was the first over the first hurdles. By the third barrier, Kerron Clement in 5, Annsert Whyte in 6 and Boniface Mucheru Tumuti in 7 had pulled even. Through the next two hurdles, Clement edged ahead with Whyte just marginally behind him. Through the final turn, Clement pushed his lead out to half a stride over Whyte, with Tumuti very close to Whyte on the outside. By the ninth barrier, Tumuti pulled even with Whyte. Clement was already on the ground after the hurdle before Copello began to rise. Another stride back in a battle to stay out of last place was Thomas Barr. But through what remained of the home straight, Clement began to come back to the field as Tumuti pulled ahead of Whyte, while Barr and Copello was making a final charge at all three. In the run in, Clement strained to successfully hold off Tumuti, to take the gold, while Copello closed strongly, barely holding off a late rush by Barr for bronze as Whyte faded.

Behind Clement, all the other athletes set national records for their countries except last place Haron Koech, who watched Tumuti take the Kenyan record in front of him and Whyte.

The medals were presented by Issa Hayatou, IOC member, Cameroon and Víctor López, Council Member of the IAAF.

== Qualification ==
A National Olympic Committee (NOC) could enter up to 3 qualified athletes in the men's 400 metres hurdles event if all athletes meet the entry standard during the qualifying period. (The limit of 3 has been in place since the 1930 Olympic Congress.) The qualifying standard was 49.40 seconds. The qualifying period was from 1 May 2015 to 11 July 2016. The qualifying time standards could be obtained in various meets during the given period that have the approval of the IAAF. Both outdoor and indoor meets were accepted. NOCs could also use their universality place—each NOC could enter one male athlete regardless of time if they had no male athletes meeting the entry standard for an athletics event—in the 400 metres hurdles. The maximum number of athletes per nation had been set at 3 since the 1930 Olympic Congress.

== Competition format ==
The competition used the three-round format used every Games since 1908 (except the four-round competition in 1952): quarterfinals, semifinals, and a final. The number of semifinals returned to 3 after being reduced to 2 in 2012. Ten sets of hurdles were set on the course. The hurdles were 3 feet (91.5 centimetres) tall and were placed 35 metres apart beginning 45 metres from the starting line, resulting in a 40 metres home stretch after the last hurdle. The 400 metres track was standard.

There were 6 quarterfinal heats with between 7 and 8 athletes each. The top 3 men in each quarterfinal advanced to the semifinals along with the next fastest 6 overall. The 24 semifinalists were divided into 3 semifinals of 8 athletes each, with the top 2 in each semifinal and next 2 fastest overall advancing to the 8-man final.

== Records ==
Prior to this competition, the existing global and area records were as follows:

World record	Kevin Young (USA)	46.78	Barcelona, Spain	6 August 1992
Olympic record	Kevin Young (USA)	46.78	Barcelona, Spain	6 August 1992
World Leading	Johnny Dutch (USA)	48.10	Kingston, Jamaica	11 June 2016

Area	Time	Athlete	Nation
Africa (records)	47.10	Samuel Matete	Zambia
Asia (records)	47.53	Hadi Soua'an Al-Somaily	Saudi Arabia
Europe (records)	47.37	Stephane Diagana	France
North, Central America and Caribbean (records)	46.78 WR	Kevin Young	United States
Oceania (records)	48.28	Rohan Robinson	Australia
South America (records)	47.84	Bayano Kamani	Panama

The following national records were established during the competition:

Country	Athlete	Round	Time
Algeria	Abdelmalik Lahoulou	Heats	48.62
Norway	Karsten Warholm	Heats	48.49
Finland	Oskari Mörö	Heats	49.04
Seychelles	Ned Justeen Azemia	Heats	50.74
(Republic of Ireland) Ireland	Thomas Barr	Semifinals	48.39
Kenya	Boniface Mucheru Tumuti	Final	47.78
Turkey	Yasmani Copello	Final	47.92
(Republic of Ireland) Ireland	Thomas Barr	Final	47.97
Estonia	Rasmus Mägi	Final	48.40

== Schedule ==
All times are Brasilia Time (UTC-3)

Date	Time	Round
Monday, 15 August 2016	11:35	Quarterfinals
Tuesday, 16 August 2016	21:35	Semifinals
Thursday, 18 August 2016	12:00	Final

== Results ==
=== Quarterfinals ===
Qualification rules: first 3 of each heat (Q) plus the 6 fastest times (q) qualified.

==== Quarterfinal 1 ====
Rank	Lane	Athlete	Nation	Time	Notes
1	8	Abdelmalik Lahoulou	Algeria	48.62	Q, NR
2	7	Boniface Mucheru Tumuti	Kenya	48.91	Q
3	2	Kerron Clement	United States	49.17	Q
4	4	Yuki Matsushita	Japan	49.60	
5	5	Miles Ukaoma	Nigeria	49.84	
6	3	Marcio Teles	Brazil	50.41	
7	6	Jeffery Gibson	Bahamas	52.77	

==== Quarterfinal 2 ====
Rank	Lane	Athlete	Nation	Time	Notes
1	5	Yasmani Copello	Turkey	49.52	Q
2	6	Eric Alejandro	Puerto Rico	49.54	Q
3	1	Mahau Suguimati	Brazil	49.77	Q
4	8	Jaak-Heinrich Jagor	Estonia	49.78	
5	2	Kariem Hussein	Switzerland	49.80	
6	7	Amadou Ndiaye	Senegal	49.91	
7	4	Martin Kucera	Slovakia	51.47	
8	3	Maoulida Daroueche	Comoros	52.32	

==== Quarterfinal 3 ====
Rank	Lane	Athlete	Nation	Time	Notes
1	2	Karsten Warholm	Norway	48.49	Q, NR
2	3	Javier Culson	Puerto Rico	48.53	Q, SB
3	8	Rasmus Mägi	Estonia	48.55	Q, SB
4	7	Roxroy Cato	Jamaica	48.56	q, SB
5	6	Miloud Rahmani	Algeria	49.73	
6	1	Dmitriy Koblov	Kazakhstan	49.87	
7	5	José Luis Gaspar	Cuba	50.58	
8	4	Ned Justeen Azemia	Seychelles	50.74	NR

==== Quarterfinal 4 ====
Rank	Lane	Athlete	Nation	Time	Notes
1	7	Keisuke Nozawa	Japan	48.62	Q, PB
2	3	Thomas Barr	Ireland	48.93	Q, SB
3	8	Eric Cray	Philippines	49.05	Q
4	4	Jaheel Hyde	Jamaica	49.24	q
5	1	Sergio Fernandez	Spain	49.31	q
6	5	Sebastian Rodger	Great Britain	49.54	
7	6	Le Roux Hamman	South Africa	49.72	
8	2	Jehue Gordon	Trinidad and Tobago	49.90	SB

==== Quarterfinal 5 ====
Rank	Lane	Athlete	Nation	Time	Notes
1	1	Annsert Whyte	Jamaica	48.37	Q, PB
2	7	Jack Green	Great Britain	48.96	Q, SB
3	4	Byron Robinson	United States	48.98	Q
4	5	Oskari Mörö	Finland	49.04	q, NR
5	2	Michael Bultheel	Belgium	49.37	q, SB
6	3	Kurt Couto	Mozambique	49.74	SB
7	6	Lindsay Hanekom	South Africa	50.22	
—	8	Nicholas Kiplagat Bett	Kenya	DQ	R168.7b

==== Quarterfinal 6 ====
Rank	Lane	Athlete	Nation	Time	Notes
1	4	Haron Koech	Kenya	48.77	Q, PB
2	8	L.J. Van Zyl	South Africa	49.12	Q
3	5	Andres Silva	Uruguay	49.21	Q, SB
4	7	Jordin Andrade	Cape Verde	49.35	q
5	6	Mohamed Sghaier	Tunisia	50.09	SB
6	1	Michael Tinsley	United States	50.18	
7	3	Chen Chieh	Chinese Taipei	50.65	
8	2	Patryk Dobek	Poland	50.66	

=== Semifinals ===
Qualification rules: first 2 of each heat (Q) plus the 2 fastest times (q) qualified.

==== Semifinal 1 ====
Rank	Lane	Athlete	Nation	Time	Notes
1	8	Kerron Clement	United States	48.26	Q, SB
2	6	Boniface Mucheru Tumuti	Kenya	48.85	Q, SB
3	1	Sergio Fernandez	Spain	48.87	
4	5	Abdelmalik Lahoulou	Algeria	49.08	
5	2	Jaheel Hyde	Jamaica	49.17	
6	3	Keisuke Nozawa	Japan	49.20	
7	7	Eric Cray	Philippines	49.37	
8	4	Jack Green	Great Britain	49.54	

==== Semifinal 2 ====
Rank	Lane	Athlete	Nation	Time	Notes
1	4	Annsert Whyte	Jamaica	48.32	Q, PB
2	5	Javier Culson	Puerto Rico	48.46	Q, SB
3	6	Yasmani Copello	Turkey	48.61	q
4	7	Rasmus Mägi	Estonia	48.64	q
5	3	L.J. Van Zyl	South Africa	49.00	
6	1	Jordin Andrade	Cape Verde	49.32	
7	2	Oskari Mörö	Finland	49.75	
8	8	Mahau Suguimati	Brazil	49.77	

==== Semifinal 3 ====
Rank	Lane	Athlete	Nation	Time	Notes
1	4	Thomas Barr	Ireland	48.39	Q, NR
2	6	Haron Koech	Kenya	48.49	Q, PB
3	7	Byron Robinson	United States	48.65	PB
4	5	Karsten Warholm	Norway	48.81	
5	1	Michael Bultheel	Belgium	49.46	
6	8	Andres Silva	Uruguay	49.75	
7	3	Eric Alejandro	Puerto Rico	49.95	
—	2	Roxroy Cato	Jamaica	DQ	R168.7a

=== Final ===
Rank	Lane	Athlete	Nation	Reaction	Time	Notes
1st place, gold medalist(s)	5	Kerron Clement	United States	0.227	47.73	SB
2nd place, silver medalist(s)	7	Boniface Mucheru Tumuti	Kenya	0.165	47.78	NR
3rd place, bronze medalist(s)	2	Yasmani Copello	Turkey	0.186	47.92	NR
4	4	Thomas Barr	Ireland	0.191	47.97	NR
5	6	Annsert Whyte	Jamaica	0.167	48.07	PB
6	1	Rasmus Mägi	Estonia	0.182	48.40	NR
7	8	Haron Koech	Kenya	0.159	49.09	
—	3	Javier Culson	Puerto Rico	—	DQ	R162.7

== Results summary ==
Rank	Athlete	Nation	Quarterfinals	Semifinals	Final	Notes
1st place, gold medalist(s)	Kerron Clement	United States	49.17	48.26	47.73	SB
2nd place, silver medalist(s)	Boniface Mucheru Tumuti	Kenya	48.91	48.85	47.78	NR
3rd place, bronze medalist(s)	Yasmani Copello	Turkey	49.52	48.61	47.92	NR
4	Thomas Barr	Ireland	48.93	48.39	47.97	NR
5	Annsert Whyte	Jamaica	48.37	48.32	48.07	PB
6	Rasmus Mägi	Estonia	48.55	48.64	48.40	NR
7	Haron Koech	Kenya	48.77	48.49	49.09	PB
8	Javier Culson	Puerto Rico	48.53	48.46	DQ	SB
9	Byron Robinson	United States	48.98	48.65	Did not advance	PB
10	Karsten Warholm	Norway	48.49	48.81	Did not advance	
11	Sergio Fernandez	Spain	49.31	48.87	Did not advance	
12	L.J. Van Zyl	South Africa	49.12	49.00	Did not advance	
13	Abdelmalik Lahoulou	Algeria	48.62	49.08	Did not advance	NR
14	Jaheel Hyde	Jamaica	49.24	49.17	Did not advance	
15	Keisuke Nozawa	Japan	48.62	49.20	Did not advance	PB
16	Jordin Andrade	Cape Verde	49.35	49.32	Did not advance	
17	Eric Cray	Philippines	49.05	49.37	Did not advance	
18	Michael Bultheel	Belgium	49.37	49.46	Did not advance	SB
19	Jack Green	Great Britain	48.96	49.54	Did not advance	SB
20	Oskari Mörö	Finland	49.04	49.75	Did not advance	NR
21	Andres Silva	Uruguay	49.21	49.75	Did not advance	SB
22	Mahau Suguimati	Brazil	49.77	49.77	Did not advance	
23	Eric Alejandro	Puerto Rico	49.54	49.95	Did not advance	
24	Roxroy Cato	Jamaica	48.56	DQ	Did not advance	SB
25	Sebastian Rodger	Great Britain	49.54	did not advance		
26	Yuki Matsushita	Japan	49.60	did not advance		
27	Le Roux Hamman	South Africa	49.72	did not advance		
28	Miloud Rahmani	Algeria	49.73	did not advance		
29	Kurt Couto	Mozambique	49.74	did not advance		SB
30	Jaak-Heinrich Jagor	Estonia	49.78	did not advance		
31	Kariem Hussein	Switzerland	49.80	did not advance		
32	Miles Ukaoma	Nigeria	49.84	did not advance		
33	Dmitriy Koblov	Kazakhstan	49.87	did not advance		
34	Jehue Gordon	Trinidad and Tobago	49.90	did not advance		SB
35	Amadou Ndiaye	Senegal	49.91	did not advance		
36	Mohamed Sghaier	Tunisia	50.09	did not advance		SB
37	Michael Tinsley	United States	50.18	did not advance		
38	Lindsay Hanekom	South Africa	50.22	did not advance		
39	Marcio Teles	Brazil	50.41	did not advance		
40	José Luis Gaspar	Cuba	50.58	did not advance		
41	Chen Chieh	Chinese Taipei	50.65	did not advance		
42	Patryk Dobek	Poland	50.66	did not advance		
43	Ned Justeen Azemia	Seychelles	50.74	did not advance		NR
44	Martin Kucera	Slovakia	51.47	did not advance		
45	Maoulida Daroueche	Comoros	52.32	did not advance		
46	Jeffery Gibson	Bahamas	52.77	did not advance		
47	Nicholas Kiplagat Bett	Kenya	DQ	did not advance		
