= Athletics at the 2015 Summer Universiade – Men's 400 metres hurdles =

The men's 400 metres hurdles event at the 2015 Summer Universiade was held on 8, 9 and 10 July at the Gwangju Universiade Main Stadium.

== Medalists ==
Gold	Silver	Bronze
Thomas Barr; Ireland	Abdelmalik Lahoulou; Algeria	Ivan Shablyuyev; Russia

== Results ==
=== Heats ===
Qualification: First 3 in each heat (Q) and next 6 fastest (q) qualified for the semifinals.

Rank	Heat	Name	Nationality	Time	Notes
1	5	Thomas Barr	Ireland	49.96	Q
2	5	Michal Brož	Czech Republic	50.36	Q
3	6	Juander Santos	Dominican Republic	50.66	Q
4	1	Abdelmalik Lahoulou	Algeria	50.71	Q
5	4	Ivan Shablyuyev	Russia	50.74	Q
6	6	Artur Terezan	Brazil	50.78	Q, SB
7	1	Eusebio Haliti	Italy	50.95	Q, SB
8	1	Nikita Andriyanov	Russia	51.13	Q
9	4	Lindsay Hanekom	South Africa	51.19	Q
10	1	Jesper Arts	Netherlands	51.39	q, SB
11	4	Tibor Koroknai	Hungary	51.42	Q
12	3	Cameron French	New Zealand	51.46	Q
13	2	Chen Chieh	Chinese Taipei	51.47	Q
14	5	Tim Rummens	Belgium	51.50	Q
15	1	Amadou Ndiaye	Senegal	51.51	q
16	3	Leroux Hamman	South Africa	51.55	Q
17	6	Keyunta Hayes	United States	51.61	Q
18	5	Han Se-hyun	South Korea	51.65	q
19	2	Petteri Monni	Finland	51.96	Q, SB
20	2	Alfredo Sepulveda	Chile	51.99	Q
21	3	Máximo Mercedes	Dominican Republic	52.03	Q, PB
22	6	Jānis Baltušs	Latvia	52.12	q
23	3	Gerald Drummond	Costa Rica	52.16	q
24	4	Dmitriy Koblov	Kazakhstan	52.22	q
25	4	Jaime Rodríguez	Argentina	52.31	
26	5	Robert Dwumfour	Ghana	52.50	SB
27	6	Andreas Ritz	Switzerland	52.59	
28	2	Chan Ka Chun	Hong Kong	52.62	
29	2	Anders Idaas	Norway	52.90	
30	3	Andrés Toro	Venezuela	52.92	
31	3	Khalil Parris	Canada	53.02	
32	5	Robert Bryliński	Poland	53.23	
33	4	Maksims Semjonovs	Latvia	53.51	
34	4	Peter Hribaršek	Slovenia	53.59	
35	1	Katlego Lenkopane	Botswana	53.82	
36	6	Saber Boukemouche	Algeria	54.41	
37	2	Disanayaka Mudiyanselage	Sri Lanka	55.54	SB
38	1	Kemoi Charles	United States Virgin Islands	56.53	
39	6	Farhan Ilyas	Pakistan	59.14	
	5	Oeyvind Kjerpeset	Norway	DQ	
	2	Johannes Maritz	Namibia	DNS	
	3	Daniel Saliba	Malta	DNS	

=== Semifinals ===
Qualification: First 2 in each heat (Q) and the next 2 fastest (q) qualified for the final.

Rank	Heat	Name	Nationality	Time	Notes
1	1	Thomas Barr	Ireland	49.75	Q
2	3	Abdelmalik Lahoulou	Algeria	49.83	Q
3	3	Ivan Shablyuyev	Russia	50.00	Q
4	2	Artur Terezan	Brazil	50.18	Q, SB
5	2	Juander Santos	Dominican Republic	50.27	Q, PB
6	2	Cameron French	New Zealand	50.31	q
7	2	Amadou Ndiaye	Senegal	50.35	q
8	1	Chen Chieh	Chinese Taipei	50.36	Q
8	3	Lindsay Hanekom	South Africa	50.36	
10	1	Nikita Andriyanov	Russia	50.47	SB
11	2	Tibor Koroknai	Hungary	50.63	SB
12	2	Leroux Hamman	South Africa	51.07	
13	1	Michal Brož	Czech Republic	51.27	
14	2	Alfredo Sepulveda	Chile	51.32	
15	3	Eusebio Haliti	Italy	51.47	
16	3	Jānis Baltušs	Latvia	51.76	
17	1	Petteri Monni	Finland	51.95	SB
18	3	Han Se-hyun	South Korea	52.09	
19	1	Máximo Mercedes	Dominican Republic	52.29	
20	1	Jesper Arts	Netherlands	52.37	
21	3	Keyunta Hayes	United States	52.96	
22	2	Gerald Drummond	Costa Rica	53.35	
	1	Dmitriy Koblov	Kazakhstan	DNF	
	3	Tim Rummens	Belgium	DNF	

=== Final ===
Official Video

Rank	Lane	Name	Nationality	Time	Notes
1st place, gold medalist(s)	4	Thomas Barr	Ireland	48.78	
2nd place, silver medalist(s)	5	Abdelmalik Lahoulou	Algeria	48.99	NR
3rd place, bronze medalist(s)	6	Ivan Shablyuyev	Russia	49.04	PB
4	3	Artur Terezan	Brazil	49.73	PB
5	2	Cameron French	New Zealand	49.92	
6	8	Chen Chieh	Chinese Taipei	50.22	
7	7	Juander Santos	Dominican Republic	50.34	
8	1	Amadou Ndiaye	Senegal	51.48	
