= Creve Armando Machava =

Mozambican hurdler (born 1996)

Personal information
- Born: 8 February 1996 (age 30) Maputo, Mozambique

Sport
- Sport: Athletics
- Event: 400 m hurdles
- Club: TS Herzogenaurach
- Coached by: Peter Müller

Creve Armando Machava (born 8 February 1996) is a Mozambican athlete specialising in the 400 metres hurdles. He represented his country at the 2017 World Championships without reaching the semifinals. In addition, he won the gold medal at the 2017 Islamic Solidarity Games.

His personal best in the event is 49.54 seconds set in Marrocos in 2019.

He competed in the men's 400 metres hurdles event at the 2020 Summer Olympics.

== International competitions ==
| Year | Competition | Venue | Position | Event | Notes |
Representing Mozambique
| 2013 | African Youth Championships | Warri, Nigeria | 3rd | 110 m hurdles (91.4 cm) | 14.31 |
| 2013 | African Junior Championships | Bambous, Mauritius | 10th (h) | 110 m hurdles (99 cm) | 15.45 |
| 2013 | African Junior Championships | Bambous, Mauritius | 6th | 400 m hurdles | 54.38 |
| 2014 | Lusophony Games | Goa, India | 2nd | 400 m hurdles | 53.44 |
| 2014 | World Junior Championships | Eugene, United States | 12th (sf) | 400 m hurdles | 51.97 |
| 2016 | African Championships | Durban, South Africa | 9th (h) | 400 m hurdles | 51.62 |
| 2017 | Islamic Solidarity Games | Baku, Azerbaijan | 1st | 400 m hurdles | 50.73 |
| 2017 | World Championships | London, United Kingdom | 32nd (h) | 400 m hurdles | 51.71 |
| 2018 | Commonwealth Games | Gold Coast, Australia | 19th (h) | 400 m hurdles | 51.60 |
| 2019 | African Games | Rabat, Morocco | 1st (h) | 400 m hurdles | 49.54^{1} |
| 2019 | World Championships | Doha, Qatar | 30th (h) | 400 m hurdles | 50.76 |
| 2021 | Olympic Games | Tokyo, Japan | 30th (h) | 400 m hurdles | 50.37 |

^{1}Did not finish in the final
