= Miles Ukaoma =

Nigerian athlete

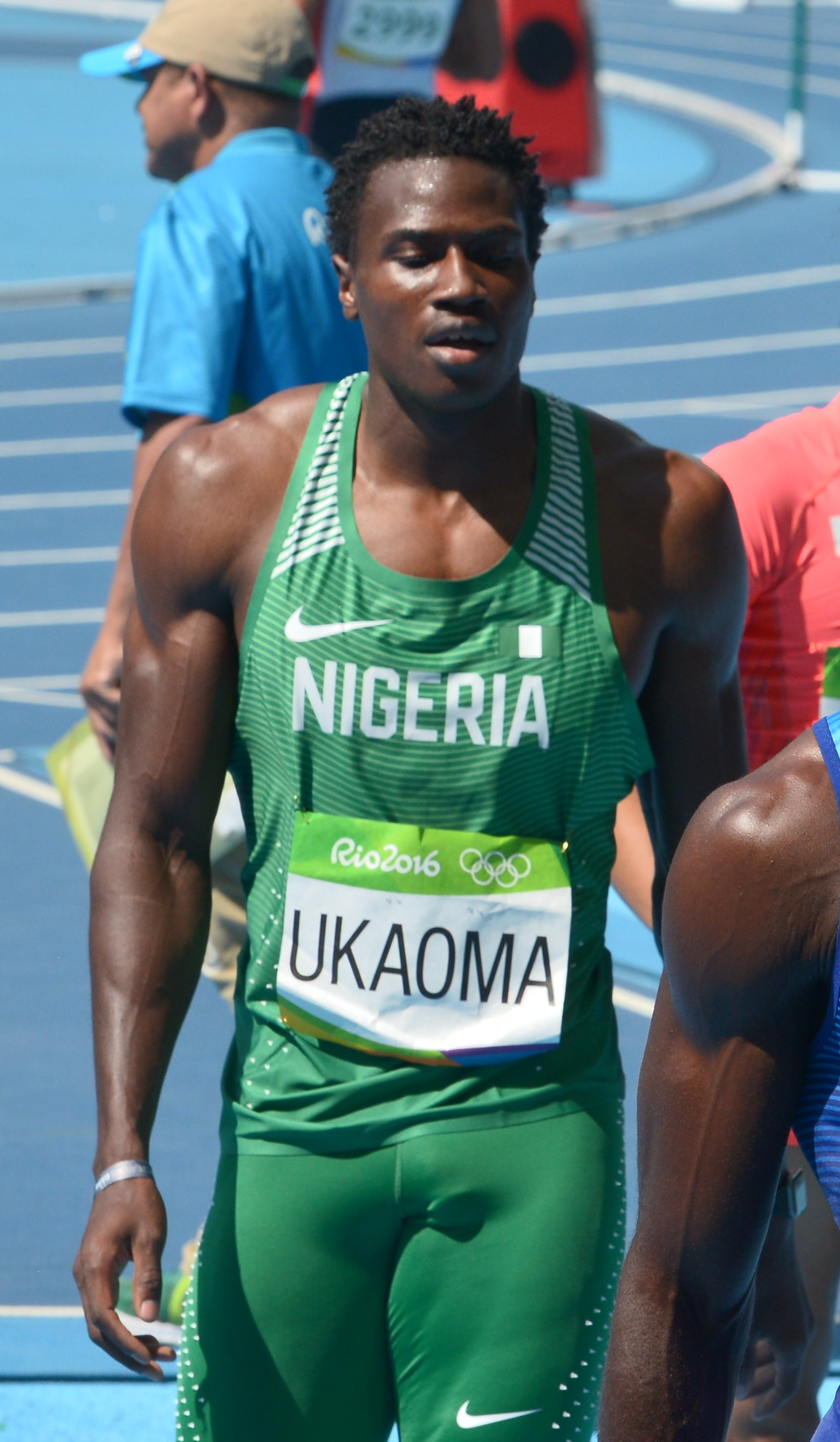
- Ukaoma at the 2016 Olympics

Personal information
- Born: 21 July 1992 (age 34) Maize, Kansas, U.S.
- Height: 1.86 m (6 ft 1 in)
- Weight: 84 kg (185 lb)

Sport
- Country: Nigeria
- Sport: Track and field
- Event: Hurdles
- College team: University of Nebraska–Lincoln

Achievements and titles
- Olympic finals: yes
- Personal bests: 110 mH – 13.85 (2014); 400 mH – 48.84 (2015)
Medal record
Men's athletics
Representing Nigeria
African Championships
Silver medal – second place	2014 Marrakesh	4×400 m

Miles Ukaoma OLY (born 21 July 1992) is an American-born Nigerian hurdler. In 2016, Miles Ukaoma qualified for the 400 metres hurdles event at the 2016 Summer Olympics in Rio de Janeiro, He competed in the 400 metres hurdles event at the 2015 World Championships in Beijing narrowly missing the semifinals. His personal best in the 400 metres hurdles is 48.84 seconds set in Warri in 2015.

== Competition record ==
Year	Competition	Venue	Position	Event	Notes
Representing Nigeria
2014	Commonwealth Games	Glasgow, United Kingdom	7th	4 × 400 m relay	3:04.86
2014	African Championships	Porto-Novo, Benin	6th	400 m hurdles	50.40
2014	African Championships	Porto-Novo, Benin	2nd	4 × 400 m relay	3:03.09
2015	IAAF World Relays	Nassau, Bahamas	19th (h)	4 × 400 m relay	3:06.92
2015	World Championships	Beijing, China	22nd (h)	400 m hurdles	49.38
2016	African Championships	Durban, South Africa	6th (h)	400 m hurdles	50.79^{1}
2016	Olympic Games	Rio de Janeiro, Brazil	32nd (h)	400 m hurdles	49.84

^{1}Disqualified in the final
