= Athletics at the 2013 Summer Universiade – Men's 400 metres hurdles =

The men's 400 metres hurdles event at the 2013 Summer Universiade was held on 8–10 July.

== Medalists ==
Gold	Silver	Bronze
Martin Kučera; Slovakia	Amadou Ndiaye; Senegal	Ian Dewhurst; Australia

== Results ==
=== Heats ===
Qualification: First 3 in each heat and 4 best performers advance to the Semifinals.

Rank	Heat	Name	Nationality	Time	Notes
1	4	Keisuke Nozawa	Japan	50.01	Q
2	1	PC Beneke	South Africa	50.11	Q
3	1	Martin Kučera	Slovakia	50.18	Q, PB
4	2	Tomoharu Kino	Japan	50.32	Q
5	1	Amadou Ndiaye	Senegal	50.35	Q
6	1	Tait Nystuen	Canada	50.45	q
7	3	Ian Dewhurst	Australia	50.71	Q
8	3	Vaclav Barak	Czech Republic	50.77	Q
9	2	Atilla Nagy	Romania	50.83	Q, SB
10	2	Tibor Koroknai	Hungary	51.02	Q, SB
11	4	Ivan Shablyuyev	Russia	51.07	Q
12	1	Kariem Hussein	Switzerland	51.30	q
13	3	Jacques Frisch	Luxembourg	51.40	Q
14	3	Dmitriy Koblov	Kazakhstan	51.58	q
15	2	Alexandr Skorobogatko	Russia	51.74	q
16	2	Johannes Maritz	Namibia	52.18	SB
17	4	Niclas Akerstrom	Sweden	52.45	Q
18	4	Alexei Cravcenco	Moldova	52.47	
19	2	Vladislavs Prosmickis	Latvia	52.65	
20	3	Maksims Semjonovs	Latvia	52.92	PB
21	3	Anders Eriend Idaas	Norway	54.00	
22	4	Daniel Lagamang	Botswana	54.60	
23	4	Abdullaev Azim	Tajikistan	55.05	
24	3	Lankantien Lamboni	Togo	55.06	
	1	Madushanka Dinesh	Sri Lanka	DNF	
	1	Satty Kalokoh	Sierra Leone	DNS	
	4	Nicholas Maitland	Jamaica	DNS	

=== Semifinals ===
Qualification: First 3 in each heat and 2 best performers advance to the Semifinals.

Rank	Heat	Name	Nationality	Time	Notes
1	2	Amadou Ndiaye	Senegal	49.74	Q, PB
2	2	Ivan Shablyuyev	Russia	49.82	Q, PB
3	2	Ian Dewhurst	Australia	49.89	Q, PB
4	2	Keisuke Nozawa	Japan	49.90	q
5	1	PC Beneke	South Africa	49.91	Q
6	2	Martin Kučera	Slovakia	49.91	q, PB
7	1	Tomoharu Kino	Japan	50.31	Q
8	1	Vaclav Barak	Czech Republic	50.56	Q
9	1	Tibor Koroknai	Hungary	50.61	SB
10	1	Alexandr Skorobogatko	Russia	50.73	
11	2	Tait Nystuen	Canada	50.90	
12	1	Jacques Frisch	Luxembourg	51.50	
13	2	Kariem Hussein	Switzerland	51.94	
14	1	Dmitriy Koblov	Kazakhstan	53.60	
15	1	Atilla Nagy	Romania	54.13	
	2	Niclas Akerstrom	Sweden	DNF	

=== Final ===
Official Video

Rank	Lane	Name	Nationality	Time	Notes
1st place, gold medalist(s)	1	Martin Kučera	Slovakia	49.79	PB
2nd place, silver medalist(s)	3	Amadou Ndiaye	Senegal	49.90	
3rd place, bronze medalist(s)	7	Ian Dewhurst	Australia	49.96	
4	5	Tomoharu Kino	Japan	50.02	
5	6	Ivan Shablyuyev	Russia	50.11	
6	2	Keisuke Nozawa	Japan	50.15	
7	8	Vaclav Barak	Czech Republic	50.28	
8	4	PC Beneke	South Africa	50.51	
