= Rilwan Alowonle =

Nigerian hurdler

Personal information
- Full name: Mohamed Rilwan Alowonle
- Born: 12 December 1993 (age 32) United States
- Education: University of North Carolina at Chapel Hill

Sport
- Sport: Athletics
- Event: 400 metres hurdles
- College team: North Carolina Tar Heels
Medal record
Men's athletics
Representing Nigeria
African Championships
Bronze medal – third place	2018 Asaba	4×400 m

Mohamed Rilwan Alowonle (born 12 December 1993) is a US-born athlete specialising in the 400 metres hurdles. He competes internationally for Nigeria, the country of origin of both his parents. He competed at the 2019 World Championships in Doha reaching the semifinals. Earlier that year he finished fourth at the 2019 African Games.

His personal best in the event is 49.42 seconds set in Rabat in 2019.

== International competitions ==
Year	Competition	Venue	Position	Event	Notes
Representing Nigeria
2018	Commonwealth Games	Gold Coast, Australia	5th	400 m hurdles	49.80
2018	African Championships	Asaba, Nigeria	11th (h)	400 m hurdles	51.97
2018	African Championships	Asaba, Nigeria	3rd	4 × 400 m relay	3:04.88
2019	African Games	Rabat, Morocco	4th	400 m hurdles	49.42
2019	World Championships	Doha, Qatar	24th (sf)	400 m hurdles	52.01
2022	African Championships	Port Louis, Mauritius	20th (h)	400 m hurdles	60.13
2024	African Championships	Douala, Cameroon	10th (h)	400 m hurdles	50.95
