= Athletics at the 2013 Summer Universiade – Men's 4 × 400 metres relay =

The men's 4 x 400 metres relay event at the 2013 Summer Universiade was held on 11–12 July.

== Medalists ==
| Gold | Silver | Bronze |
|---|---|---|
| Canada; Benjamin Ayesu-Attah; Brendon Rodney; Michael Robertson; Tyler Harper | South Africa; Pieter Conradie; Jacques de Swardt; PC Beneke; Wayde van Niekerk | Turkey; Buğrahan Kocabeyoğlu; Halit Kiliç; Mehmet Güzel; Yavuz Can |

== Results ==
=== Heats ===
Qualification: First 3 teams of each heat (Q) plus the next 2 fastest (q) qualified for the final.

| Rank | Heat | Nation | Athletes | Time | Notes |
|---|---|---|---|---|---|
| 1 | 2 | Russia | Maksim Dyldin, Dmitry Buryak, Radel Kashefrazov, Vladimir Krasnov | 3:06.94 | Q |
| 2 | 1 | Canada | Benjamin Ayesu-Attah, Brendon Rodney, Michael Robertson, Tyler Harper | 3:07.14 | Q |
| 3 | 2 | Turkey | Doruk Uğurer, Halit Kiliç, Mehmet Güzel, Yavuz Can | 3:09.84 | Q |
| 4 | 2 | South Africa | Pieter Conradie, PC Beneke, Jacques de Swardt, Wayde van Niekerk | 3:09.88 | Q |
| 5 | 1 | Japan | Yousuke Hara, Keisuke Nozawa, Tomoharu Kino, Kengo Yamasaki | 3:10.39 | Q |
| 6 | 1 | Australia | Ian Dewhurst, Mathew Lynch, Alexander Carew, Tom Gamble | 3:12.52 | Q |
| 7 | 1 | Botswana | Busang David, Keene Motukisi, Daniel Lagamang, Mothusi Bolele | 3:13.72 | q |
| 8 | 1 | Uganda | Geoffrey Akena, Johnson Anywar, Richard Ongom, Daniel Bingi | 3:16.53 | q |
| 9 | 2 | Oman | Mohammed Al-Shueli, Salah Al-Ajmi, Usama Al-Gheilani, Othman Al-Busaidi | 3:19.50 | |
| 10 | 2 | Sri Lanka | Pathirajage Henarath, Chameera Hewa Fonsekage, Gayan Paradiya Waththalage, Madushanka Dinesh | 3:28.23 | |
| | 2 | Ghana | Elorm Amenakpor, Sampson Anane, Felix Attafoe, Mohammed Abubakari | DQ | |

=== Final ===
| Rank | Nation | Athletes | Time | Notes |
|---|---|---|---|---|
| 1st place, gold medalist(s) | Canada | Benjamin Ayesu-Attah, Brendon Rodney, Michael Robertson, Tyler Harper | 3:05.26 | |
| 2nd place, silver medalist(s) | South Africa | Pieter Conradie, Jacques de Swardt, PC Beneke, Wayde van Niekerk | 3:06.19 | |
| 3rd place, bronze medalist(s) | Turkey | Buğrahan Kocabeyoğlu, Halit Kiliç, Mehmet Güzel, Yavuz Can | 3:06.36 | |
| 4 | Japan | Jun Kimura, Keisuke Nozawa, Sho Kawamoto, Kengo Yamasaki | 3:06.58 | |
| 5 | Australia | Ian Dewhurst, Mathew Lynch, Alexander Carew, Tom Gamble | 3:08.82 | |
| 6 | Botswana | Keene Motukisi, Busang David, Daniel Lagamang, Mothusi Bolele | 3:15.75 | |
| | Uganda | Emmanuel Tugumisirize, Johnson Anywar, Noah Mwidu, Daniel Bingi | DQ | |
| DQ | Russia | Maksim Dyldin, Dmitry Buryak, Radel Kashefrazov, Vladimir Krasnov | | |
