= Keisuke Nozawa =

Japanese athletics competitor

Personal information
- Born: 7 June 1991 (age 35) Yamanashi Prefecture, Japan
- Education: Waseda University
- Height: 1.75 m (5 ft 9 in)
- Weight: 62 kg (137 lb)

Sport
- Sport: Athletics
- Event: 400 metres hurdles

Keisuke Nozawa (野澤 啓佑, Nozawa Keisuke; born 7 June 1991) is a Japanese athlete competing in the 400 metres hurdles. He represented his country at the 2016 Summer Olympics, reaching the semifinals.

His personal best in the event is 48.62 seconds, set in Rio de Janeiro in 2016.

== International competitions ==
Year	Competition	Venue	Position	Event	Notes
Representing Japan
2013	Universiade	Kazan, Russia	6th	400 m hurdles	50.15
2013	Universiade	Kazan, Russia	5th	4 × 400 m relay	3:06.58
2013	East Asian Games	Tianjin, China	3rd	400 m hurdles	50.61
2013	East Asian Games	Tianjin, China	2nd	4 × 400 m relay	3:07.32
2016	Olympic Games	Rio de Janeiro, Brazil	15th (sf)	400 m hurdles	49.20
