= List of Togolese records in athletics =

The following are the national records in athletics in Togo maintained by Togo's national athletics federation: Fédération Togolaise d'Athlétisme (FTA).

== Outdoor ==
Key to tables: Awaiting ratification Record not kept by FTA

=== Men ===
| Event | Record | Athlete | Date | Meet | Place | Ref. |
|---|---|---|---|---|---|---|
| 100 m | 10.30 (+1.5 m/s) | Franck Amégnigan | 8 June 1996 | | Versailles, France | |
| 200 m | 20.87 (+1.7 m/s) | Casimir Kossi Akoto | 23 June 1996 | | Bondoufle, France | |
| 400 m | 46.92 | Casimir Kossi Akoto | 16 July 1995 | | Viry-Châtillon, France | |
| 800 m | 1:52.09 | Roger Kangni | 31 August 1972 | Olympic Games | Munich, West Germany | |
| 800 m | 1:50.09 | Makman Yoagbati | 2 August 2023 | Jeux de la Francophonie | Kinshasa, Democratic Republic of the Congo | |
| 1500 m | 3:55.0 h | Roger Kangni | 1972 | | | |
| 1500 m | 3:53.78 | Makman Yoagbati | 26 August 2022 | | Lomé, Togo | |
| 3000 m | 8:35.17 | Yawo Kloutse | 20 July 2005 | | Paris, France | |
| 5000 m | 14:41.37 | Moipah Kombate | 21 July 2019 | Tournoi de la Solidarité | Niamey, Niger | |
| 10,000 m | 30:13.81 | Kama Pakoula Lekadé | 15 September 1995 | | Rome, Italy | |
| Half marathon | 1:06:25 | Clement Lamboni | 19 March 2001 | | Dakar, Senegal | |
| Marathon | 2:30:17 | Outcha Améwouho | 11 November 1990 | | Lomé, Togo | |
| 110 m hurdles | 15.03 | Lamboni Lankantien | 19 May 2013 | Tournoi de la Solidarite | Bamako, Mali | |
| 400 m hurdles | 53.27 | Lamboni Lankantien | 18 May 2013 | Tournoi de la Solidarite | Bamako, Mali | |
| 3000 m steeplechase | 9:05.55 | Malaba Tchendo | 18 May 2013 | Tournoi de la Solidarité | Bamako, Mali | |
| High jump | 2.05 m | Komlan Amégan | 4 April 1981 | | Douala, Cameroon | |
| Pole vault | 5.20 m | Amdaniou Traoré | 15 August 2010 | 67th German Junior Championships | Regensburg, Germany | |
| Long jump | 8.00 m (+0.8 m/s) | Georges Téko Folligan | 15 September 1999 | | Johannesburg, South Africa | |
| Triple jump | 16.18 m (+1.3 m/s) | Didier Akotia Tchalla | 28 February 2003 | | Port Elizabeth, South Africa | |
| Shot put | 17.98 m (5th throw) | Yao Adantor | 22 June 2016 | African Championships | Durban, South Africa | |
| Shot put | 17.98 m (6th throw) | Yao Adantor | 22 June 2016 | African Championships | Durban, South Africa | |
| Discus throw | 52.72 m | Essohounamondom Tchalim | 13 September 2015 | African Games | Brazzaville, Republic of the Congo | |
| Hammer throw | 37.83 m | Yao Adantor | 12 April 2014 | Spring Invite | Fairfax, United States | |
| Javelin throw | 64.90 m | Kambor Agourou | 30/31 May 1998 | | Niamey, Nigeria | |
| Decathlon | | | | | | |
| Decathlon | 100m / Long jump / Shot put / High jump / 400m / 110m H / Discus / Pole vault / Javelin / 1500m | | | | | |
| 20 km walk (road) | | | | | | |
| 50 km walk (road) | | | | | | |
| 4 × 100 m relay | 39.45 | Togo; Teko Folligan; Menelik Lawson; Franck Amegnigan; Kossi Akoto | 12 August 1995 | World Championships | Gothenburg, Sweden | |
| 4 × 400 m relay | 3:17.7 h | Togo | 21 May 2000 | | Lomé, Togo | |

=== Women ===
| Event | Record | Athlete | Date | Meet | Place | Ref. |
|---|---|---|---|---|---|---|
| 100 m | 11.82 (−0.2 m/s) | Judith Akouvi Koumédzina | 22 May 2021 | Grand Prix International CAA | Douala, Cameroun | |
| 200 m | 24.37 NWI (Note: Outdoor best; indoor mark ratified as absolute record) | Judith Akouvi Koumédzina | 16 July 2021 | | Porto Novo, Benin | |
| 400 m | 52.50 | Sandrine Thiébaud-Kangni | 24 August 2003 | World Championships | Saint-Denis, France | |
| 800 m | 2:07.29 | Sandrine Thiébaud-Kangni | 21 July 2006 | | Tomblaine, France | |
| 1500 m | 4:36.08 | Direma Banasso | 30 June 2001 | | Lagos, Nigeria | |
| 3000 m | 10:43.97 | N'na Kpaba | 13 April 2002 | | Cotonou, Benin | |
| 5000 m | 17:10.00 | Atchadé Abla | 15 May 2011 | Tournoi de la Solidarité | Lomé, Togo | |
| 10,000 m | 40:45.2 | Hélène Banasso | May 2008 | | Lomé, Togo | |
| Marathon | | | | | | |
| 100 m hurdles | 13.60 (−0.2 m/s) | Naomi Akakpo | 26 June 2022 | French Championships | Caen, France | |
| 400 m hurdles | 1:01.14 | Sandrine Thiébaud-Kangni | 19 May 2002 | | Saint-Étienne, France | |
| 3000 m steeplechase | | | | | | |
| High jump | 1.66 m | Wesou Telou | 26 April 1998 | | Avignon, France | |
| Pole vault | | | | | | |
| Long jump | 6.42 m | Désirée Agblami | 20 June 1998 | | Viry-Châtillon, France | |
| Triple jump | 13.18 m | Edwige Néglokpé | 29 July 2001 | | Obernai, France | |
| Triple jump | 13.23 m (+0.8 m/s) | Abdou Kerim Issaka | 19 March 2024 | African Games | Accra, Ghana | |
| Shot put | 15.74 m | Alifatou Djibril | 19 February 2005 | | Adelaide, Australia | |
| Discus throw | 56.16 m | Alifatou Djibril | 28 February 2004 | | Sydney, Australia | |
| Hammer throw | 62.75 m | Florence Ezeh | 8 July 2008 | | Reims, France | |
| Javelin throw | 43.68 m | Princesse Tchangai | 20 May 2001 | | Ouagadougou, Burkina Faso | |
| Heptathlon | 5079 pts | Sandrine Thiébaud-Kangni | 10–11 April 2010 | Meeting International de Maurice | Réduit, Mauritius | |
| Heptathlon | 100m H / High jump / Shot put / 200m / Long jump / Javelin / 800m; 14.71 / 1.54 m / 10.70 m / 25.67 / 5.70 m / 29.13 m / 2:13.54 | | | | | |
| 20 km walk (road) | | | | | | |
| 50 km walk (road) | | | | | | |
| 4 × 100 m relay | 46.92 | Togo | 11 June 2016 | | Cape Coast, Ghana | |
| 4 × 400 m relay | 4:01.32 | Togo | 14 May 2006 | | Lomé, Togo | |

== Indoor ==
=== Men ===
| Event | Record | Athlete | Date | Meet | Place | Ref. |
|---|---|---|---|---|---|---|
| 60 m | 6.70 | Yendountien Tiebekabe | 31 January 2018 | Meeting National des Sacres | Reims, France | |
| 200 m | 21.57 | Casimir Akoto Kossi | 2 February 2001 | | Paris, France | |
| 400 m | 48.19 | Ahmed Sangbana | 27 February 1999 | | Blacksburg, United States | |
| 500 m | 1:03.80 | Ahmed Sangbana | 12 February 2000 | | Blacksburg, United States | |
| 800 m | 2:04.3 | Kodjo Tossou | 19 November 2005 | | Paris, France | |
| 1500 m | | | | | | |
| 3000 m | | | | | | |
| 60 m hurdles | | | | | | |
| High jump | | | | | | |
| Pole vault | 4.26 m | Latif Adéothy | 18 March 2001 | | Valenciennes, France | |
| Long jump | 7.54 m | Téko Folligan | 4 February 2001 | | Fronton, France | |
| Triple jump | | | | | | |
| Shot put | 17.16 m | Yao Adantor | 31 January 2015 | | State College, United States | |
| Heptathlon | | | | | | |
| Heptathlon | 60m / Long jump / Shot put / High jump / 60m H / Pole vault / 1000m | | | | | |
| 5000 m walk | | | | | | |
| 4 × 400 m relay | | | | | | |

=== Women ===
| Event | Record | Athlete | Date | Meet | Place | Ref. |
|---|---|---|---|---|---|---|
| 60 m | 7.42 A | Judith Akouvi Koumédzina | 27 February 2026 | Big Sky Conference | Pocatello, United States | |
| 200 m | 23.70 | Judith Akouvi Koumédzina | 14 February 2026 | Whitworth Invitational | Spokane, United States | |
| 300 m | 39.91 | Judith Akouvi Koumédzina | 16 January 2026 | Spokane Sports Showcase | Spokane, United States | |
| 400 m | 53.22 | Sandrine Thiébaud-Kangni | 2 March 2003 | | Aubière, France | |
| 800 m | 2:09.99 | Sandrine Thiébaud-Kangni | 2 February 2007 | | Eaubonne, France | |
| 1500 m | | | | | | |
| 3000 m | | | | | | |
| 60 m hurdles | 8.68 | Sandrine Thiébaud-Kangni | 10 February 2002 | | Eaubonne, France | |
| 60 m hurdles | 8.64 | Naomi Akakpo | 4 February 2022 | | Miramas, France | |
| High jump | 1.61 m | Edwige Néglokpé | 7 December 2003 | | Eaubonne, France | |
| Pole vault | | | | | | |
| Long jump | 6.03 m | Désirée Agblami | 20 February 2000 | Meeting Pas de Calais | Liévin, France | |
| Triple jump | 12.82 m | Edwige Néglokpé | 19 February 2005 | Meeting Pas de Calais | Liévin, France | |
| Shot put | 10.91 m (Note: record set during pentathlon competition) | Sandrine Thiébaud-Kangni | 10 February 2002 | | Eaubonne, France | |
| Weight throw | 22.24 m A | Florence Ezeh | 23 February 2001 | WAC Championships | Reno, United States | |
| Pentathlon | 3856 pts | Sandrine Thiébaud-Kangni | 10 February 2002 | | Eaubonne, France | |
| Pentathlon | 60m H / High jump / Shot put / Long jump / 800m; 8.68 / 1.48 m / 10.91 m / 5.96 m / 2:17.86 | | | | | |
| 3000 m walk | | | | | | |
| 4 × 400 m relay | | | | | | |
