= Ian Dewhurst =

Australian hurdler (born 1990)

Personal information
- Born: 13 November 1990 (age 35) Hornsby, New South Wales, Australia
- Education: University of Western Sydney
- Height: 1.85 m (6 ft 1 in)
- Weight: 79 kg (174 lb)

Sport
- Sport: Athletics
- Event: 400 metres hurdles
- Coached by: Marilyn Pearson
Medal record
Men's athletics
Representing Australia
Pacific Games
Gold medal – first place	2019 Apia	400 m hurdles

Ian Dewhurst (born 13 November 1990) is an Australian athlete specialising in the 400 metres hurdles. He won a bronze medal at the 2013 Summer Universiade. In addition, he represented his country at the 2014 and 2018 Commonwealth Games without qualifying for the final. In July 2019, he won a gold medal at the 2019 Pacific Games in Apia, where he set a Games record of 50.86 seconds.

His personal best in the event is 49.52 seconds set in Melbourne in 2014.

== International competitions ==
Year	Competition	Venue	Position	Event	Notes
Representing Australia
2013	Universiade	Kazan, Russia	3rd	400 m hurdles	49.96
2013	Universiade	Kazan, Russia	5th	4 × 400 m relay	3:08.82
2014	Commonwealth Games	Glasgow, United Kingdom	11th (h)	400 m hurdles	50.45
2014	Commonwealth Games	Glasgow, United Kingdom	6th (h)	4 × 400 m relay	3:05.41
2018	Commonwealth Games	Gold Coast, Australia	11th (h)	400 m hurdles	49.84
2019	Pacific Games	Apia	1st	400 m hurdles	50.86
