= Václav Barák =

Czech hurdler

Václav Barák (born 22 October 1990) is a Czech retired hurdler.

Internationally he finished seventh at the 2013 Universiade and also competed in the 4 × 400 metres relay at the 2012 World Indoor Championships without reaching the final.

He became Czech champion in the 400 m hurdles in 2012 and 2013, and his personal best time is 49.95 seconds, achieved at the 2013 national championships in Tábor.
