= Annsert Whyte =

Jamaican athlete

Personal information
- Born: 10 April 1987 (age 39) Kingston, Jamaica
- Height: 1.88 m (6 ft 2 in)
- Weight: 86 kg (190 lb)

Sport
- Country: Jamaica
- Sport: Track and field
- Event: 400 metres hurdles
- Club: Racers Track Club
- Coached by: Glen Mills

Annsert Sylvester Whyte (born 10 April 1987) is a Jamaican athlete competing in the 400 metres hurdles. He represented his country at the 2013 and 2015 World Championships reaching the semifinals on both occasions. His personal best in the event is 48.07 seconds set at the 2016 Summer Olympics in the final of the event.

== Competition record ==
Year	Competition	Venue	Position	Event	Notes
Representing Jamaica
2013	World Championships	Moscow, Russia	11th (sf)	400 m hurdles	49.17
2014	Commonwealth Games	Glasgow, United Kingdom	3rd (h)	400 m hurdles	49.58
2015	World Championships	Beijing, China	16th (sf)	400 m hurdles	48.90
2016	Olympic Games	Rio de Janeiro, Brazil	5th	400 m hurdles	48.07
2018	Central American and Caribbean Games	Barranquilla, Colombia	2nd	400 m hurdles	48.50
2018	NACAC Championships	Toronto, Canada	2nd	400 m hurdles	48.91
