= José Luis Gaspar =

Cuban hurdler (born 1995)

Personal information
- Born: 25 August 1995 (age 30)
- Height: 1.88 m (6 ft 2 in)
- Weight: 72 kg (159 lb)

Sport
- Sport: Athletics
- Event: 400 metres hurdles

José Luis Gaspar Hernández (born 25 August 1995) is a Cuban athlete competing in the 400 metres hurdles. He represented his country at the 2016 Summer Olympics without advancing from the first round.

His personal best in the event is 49.17 seconds set in Havana in 2016.

== International competitions ==
Year	Competition	Venue	Position	Event	Notes
Representing Cuba
2014	World Junior Championships	Eugene, United States	7th	400 m hurdles	51.71
2014	World Junior Championships	Eugene, United States	11th (h)	4 × 400 m relay	3:10.60
2015	Pan American Games	Toronto, Canada	13th (h)	400 m hurdles	51.71
2015	NACAC Championships	San José, Costa Rica	2nd	400 m hurdles	49.67
2016	Ibero-American Championships	Rio de Janeiro, Brazil	9th (h)	400 m hurdles	50.79
2016	NACAC U23 Championships	San Salvador, El Salvador	2nd	400 m hurdles	49.92
2016	Olympic Games	Rio de Janeiro, Brazil	40th (h)	400 m hurdles	50.58
2017	World Championships	London, United Kingdom	33rd (h)	400 m hurdles	51.82
2017	World Championships	London, United Kingdom	13th (h)	4 × 100 m relay	39.01
2018	Central American and Caribbean Games	Barranquilla, Colombia	12th (h)	400 m hurdles	50.82
2019	Pan American Games	Lima, Peru	7th	4 × 100 m relay	39.19
2023	Central American and Caribbean Games	San Salvador, El Salvador	10th (h)	400 m hurdles	51.73
