= Ivan Shablyuyev =

Russian hurdler

Personal information
- Born: 17 April 1988 (age 38)

Sport
- Country: Russia
- Sport: Track and field
- Event: 400 metres hurdles
- Updated on 29 August 2015

Ivan Konstantinovich Shablyuyev (Russian: Иван Константинович Шаблюев; born 17 April 1988) is a Russian hurdler. He competed in the 400 metres hurdles event at the 2015 World Championships in Beijing without qualifying for the semifinals. In addition he won a bronze medal at the 2015 Summer Universiade.

His personal best in the event is 49.04 seconds set at the Universiade in Gwangju in 2015.

== Competition record ==
Year	Competition	Venue	Position	Event	Notes
Representing Russia
2013	Universiade	Kazan, Russia	5th	400 m hurdles	50.11
2015	Universiade	Gwangju, South Korea	3rd	400 m hurdles	49.04
2015	World Championships	Beijing, China	27th (h)	400 m hurdles	49.56

== See also ==
- Russia at the 2015 World Championships in Athletics
