= Leandro Zamora =

Cuban hurdler

Personal information
- Full name: Leandro Zamora Rivero
- Born: 11 March 1996 (age 30)

Sport
- Sport: Athletics
- Event: 400 metres hurdles

Leandro Zamora Rivero (born 11 March 1996) is a Cuban athlete specialising in the 400 metres hurdles. He won a bronze medal at the 2018 Ibero-American Championships. He represented his country in the 4 × 400 metres relay at the 2017 World Championships.

== International competitions ==
| Year | Competition | Venue | Position | Event | Notes |
Representing Cuba
| 2014 | World Junior Championships | Eugene, United States | 6th | 400 m hurdles | 51.49 |
| 2014 | World Junior Championships | Eugene, United States | 11th (h) | 4 × 400 m relay | 3:10.60 |
| 2015 | Pan American Junior Championships | Edmonton, Canada | 4th | 400 m hurdles | 50.52 |
| 2017 | World Championships | London, United Kingdom | 8th (h) | 4 × 400 m relay | 3:01.88 |
| 2018 | Central American and Caribbean Games | Barranquilla, Colombia | 11th (h) | 400 m hurdles | 50.50 |
| 2018 | Central American and Caribbean Games | Barranquilla, Colombia | 1st | 4 × 400 m relay | 3:03.87 |
| 2018 | NACAC Championships | Toronto, Canada | 6th | 400 m hurdles | 50.01 |
| 2018 | NACAC Championships | Toronto, Canada | 3rd | 4 × 400 m relay | 3:04.11 |
| 2018 | Ibero-American Championships | Trujillo, Peru | 3rd | 400 m hurdles | 49.85 |
| 2019 | Pan American Games | Lima, Peru | 7th | 400 m hurdles | 50.29 |
| 2019 | Pan American Games | Lima, Peru | 5th | 4 × 400 m relay | 3:05.87 |

== Personal bests ==
Outdoor

- 200 metres – 21.88 (+1.2 m/s Havana 2016)
- 400 metres – 46.19 (Querétaro 2018)
- 800 metres – 1:59.37 (Camagüey 2014)
- 400 metres hurdles – 49.10 (Querétaro 2018)
