= Roxroy Cato =

Jamaican hurdler (born 1988)

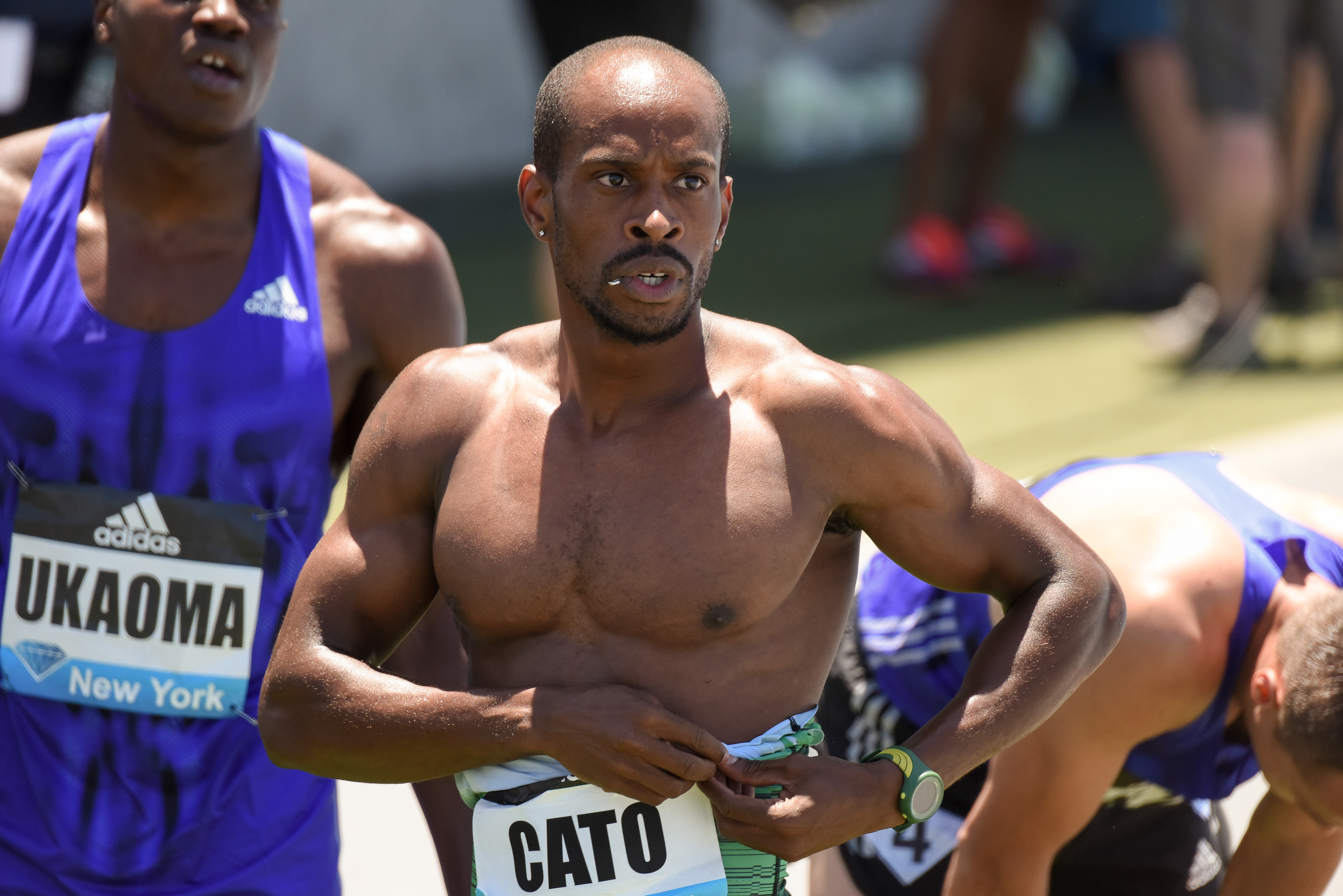
- Cato in 2015

Personal information
- Born: 5 January 1988 (age 38)
- Height: 1.83 m (6 ft 0 in)
- Weight: 77 kg (170 lb)

Sport
- Country: Jamaica
- Sport: Athletics
- Event: 400m Hurdles
- College team: Lincoln University; St. Augustine's University
Medal record
Men's athletics
Central American and Caribbean Games
Gold medal – first place	2010 Mayagüez	4x400 m relay
Bronze medal – third place	2010 Mayagüez	400 m hurdles
Pan American Games
Bronze medal – third place	2015 Toronto	400 m hurdles

Roxroy Cato (born 5 January 1988, St. Mary, Jamaica) is a Jamaican athlete specialising in the 400 metres hurdles. He placed 5th in his heat in a time of 49.03s at the 2012 Olympics.

== Competition record ==
Year	Competition	Venue	Position	Event	Notes
Representing Jamaica
2010	NACAC U23 Championships	Miramar, United States	8th	400 m hurdles	53.73
2010	NACAC U23 Championships	Miramar, United States	4th	4 × 400 m relay	3:10.71
2010	Central American and Caribbean Games	Mayagüez, Puerto Rico	3rd	400 m hurdles	49.62
2010	Central American and Caribbean Games	Mayagüez, Puerto Rico	1st	4 × 400 m relay	3:01.68
2011	Central American and Caribbean Championships	Mayagüez, Puerto Rico	6th	400 m hurdles	50.38
2012	Olympic Games	London, United Kingdom	31st (h)	400 m hurdles	50.22
2013	Central American and Caribbean Championships	Morelia, Mexico	4th	400 m hurdles	50.05
2014	Commonwealth Games	Glasgow, United Kingdom	–	400 m hurdles	DQ
2015	Pan American Games	Toronto, Canada	3rd	400 m hurdles	48.72
2015	World Championships	Beijing, China	25th (h)	400 m hurdles	49.47
2016	Olympic Games	Rio de Janeiro, Brazil	5th (h)	400 m hurdles	48.56^{1}

^{1}Disqualified in the semifinals

== Personal bests ==
Outdoor

- 400 metres hurdles – 48.48 (Kingston 2014)

Indoor

- 400 metres – 47.39 (State College 2014)
