= Lankantien Lamboni =

Togolese hurdler (born 1990)

Personal information
- Born: 31 May 1990 (age 36) Dapaong, Togo
- Education: Higher Institute of Management Adonai
- Height: 1.88 m (6 ft 2 in)
- Weight: 78 kg (172 lb)

Sport
- Country: Togo
- Sport: Athletics
- Event: 400m Hurdles

Lankantien Lamboni (born 31 May 1990) is a Togolese track and field athlete, specializing in the 400 metres hurdles. He competed at the 2012 Summer Olympics and disqualified in the heats. He ran at the Kazan Universiade Games in the 400 metres hurdles and 110 m hurdles events and at the African Championships in the 400 m huurdles.

In June 2012, Lamboni qualified for the African Championships in the 400 m hurdles, where he finished 5th in his heat and did not advance. Lamboni left Lomé for London in July 2012, though it was noted that Togo did not host an official Olympic departure ceremony as other countries did. He was reportedly upset about the food and accommodations at the London Olympic Village, noting that African cuisine wasn't provided as advertised.

Lamboni was disqualified from his Olympic 400 m hurdles heat for "improper clearance" and did not advance to the finals.

Representing Université ISM Adonaï de Porto-Novo in Benin, Lamboni returned to international competition at the 2013 World University Games, where he qualified in both the 110 m hurdles and 400 m hurdles. He finished 7th in his heat in both events and failed to advance to the finals.

At the 2016 Tournoi de la Solidarité at the Stade Modibo Kéïta in Mali, Lamboni won a bronze medal in the 110 m hurdles. He also won bronze in the 400 m hurdles at the same event in 2010, and in 2013 he set Togolese national records in both the 110 m and 400 m hurdles at a meeting in the same city.

== International competitions ==
Year	Competition	Venue	Position	Event	Notes
Representing Togo
2012	African Championships	Porto-Novo, Benin	15th (h)	400 m hurdles	53.99
2012	Olympic Games	London, United Kingdom	–	400 m hurdles	DQ
2013	Universiade	Kazan, Russia	20th (h)	110 m hurdles	15.42
2013	Universiade	Kazan, Russia	24th (h)	400 m hurdles	55.06

== Personal bests ==
Outdoor

- 110 metres hurdles – 15.42 (Kazan 2013)
- 400 metres hurdles – 53.99 (Porto Novo 2012)
