= 2014 World Junior Championships in Athletics – Men's 400 metres hurdles =

The men's 400 metres hurdles event at the 2014 World Junior Championships in Athletics was held in Eugene, Oregon, USA, at Hayward Field on 23, 24 and 25 July.

== Medalists ==
| Gold | Jaheel Hyde; Jamaica |
| Silver | Ali Khamis Khamis; Bahrain |
| Bronze | Tim Holmes; United States |

== Records ==
Standing records prior to the 2014 World Junior Championships in Athletics
| World Junior Record | Danny Harris (USA) | 48.02 | Los Angeles, United States | 17 June 1984 |
| Championship Record | Kerron Clement (USA) | 48.51 | Grosseto, Italy | 16 July 2004 |
| World Junior Leading | Jaheel Hyde (JAM) | 49.49 | Kingston, Jamaica | 28 March 2014 |
Broken records during the 2014 World Junior Championships in Athletics
| World Junior Leading | Jaheel Hyde (JAM) | 49.29 | Eugene, United States | 25 July 2014 |

== Results ==
=== Final ===
25 July
Start time: 19:33 Temperature: 27 °C Humidity: 37 %

| Rank | Name | Nationality | Lane | Reaction Time | Time | Notes |
|---|---|---|---|---|---|---|
| 1st place, gold medalist(s) | Jaheel Hyde | Jamaica | 5 | 0.169 | 49.29 | WJL |
| 2nd place, silver medalist(s) | Ali Khamis Khamis | Bahrain | 3 | 0.172 | 49.55 | NJR |
| 3rd place, bronze medalist(s) | Tim Holmes | United States | 6 | 0.200 | 50.07 | |
| 4 | Jonas Hanssen | Germany | 4 | 0.165 | 51.07 | |
| 5 | Yi Sihang | China | 2 | 0.184 | 51.32 | PB |
| 6 | Leandro Zamora | Cuba | 1 | 0.157 | 51.49 | |
| 7 | José Luis Gaspar | Cuba | 8 | 0.225 | 51.71 | |
| | Ruan Mentz | South Africa | 7 | 0.203 | DNF | |

=== Semifinals ===
24 July
First 2 in each heat (Q) and the next 2 fastest (q) advance to the Final

==== Summary ====
| Rank | Name | Nationality | Time | Notes |
|---|---|---|---|---|
| 1 | Ali Khamis Khamis | Bahrain | 49.93 | Q NJR |
| 2 | Jaheel Hyde | Jamaica | 50.77 | Q |
| 3 | Tim Holmes | United States | 50.80 | Q |
| 4 | Jonas Hanssen | Germany | 50.93 | Q |
| 5 | Ruan Mentz | South Africa | 51.03 | Q |
| 6 | Leandro Zamora | Cuba | 51.30 | q |
| 7 | José Luis Gaspar | Cuba | 51.37 | Q |
| 8 | Yi Sihang | China | 51.39 | q PB |
| 9 | Wang Guozhong | China | 51.61 | |
| 10 | Yusuke Sakanashi | Japan | 51.68 | |
| 11 | Luca Cacopardo | Italy | 51.90 | |
| 12 | Creve Armando Machava | Mozambique | 51.97 | PB |
| 13 | Jucian Rafael Pereira | Brazil | 51.98 | |
| 14 | Rivaldo Leacock | Barbados | 52.16 | |
| 15 | Kenneth Selmon | United States | 52.18 | |
| 16 | Avotriniaina Rakotoarimiandry | Madagascar | 52.33 | |
| 17 | Bryce Collins | Australia | 52.62 | |
| 18 | Lukáš Hodboď | Czech Republic | 52.75 | |
| 19 | Jared Kerr | Canada | 52.91 | |
| 20 | Martin Tucek | Czech Republic | 53.17 | |
| 21 | Jordan Sherwood | Canada | 53.41 | |
| 22 | Jacob Paul | United Kingdom | 54.36 | |
| 23 | Francesco Proietti | Italy | 55.28 | |
| 24 | Okeen Williams | Jamaica | 56.37 | |

==== Details ====
First 2 in each heat (Q) and the next 2 fastest (q) advance to the Final

===== Semifinal 1 =====
25 July
Start time: 12:23 Temperature: 21 °C Humidity: 53%

| Rank | Name | Nationality | Lane | Reaction Time | Time | Notes |
|---|---|---|---|---|---|---|
| 1 | Tim Holmes | United States | 6 | 0.198 | 50.80 | Q |
| 2 | Jonas Hanssen | Germany | 4 | 0.165 | 50.93 | Q |
| 3 | Yusuke Sakanashi | Japan | 3 | 0.148 | 51.68 | |
| 4 | Luca Cacopardo | Italy | 5 | 0.174 | 51.90 | |
| 5 | Jucian Rafael Pereira | Brazil | 2 | 0.244 | 51.98 | |
| 6 | Lukáš Hodboď | Czech Republic | 8 | 0.173 | 52.75 | |
| 7 | Jordan Sherwood | Canada | 1 | 0.140 | 53.41 | |
| 8 | Okeen Williams | Jamaica | 7 | 0.200 | 56.37 | |

===== Semifinal 2 =====
25 July
Start time: 12:29 Temperature: 21 °C Humidity: 53%

| Rank | Name | Nationality | Lane | Reaction Time | Time | Notes |
|---|---|---|---|---|---|---|
| 1 | Jaheel Hyde | Jamaica | 6 | 0.189 | 50.77 | Q |
| 2 | José Luis Gaspar | Cuba | 5 | 0.191 | 51.37 | Q |
| 3 | Wang Guozhong | China | 3 | 0.150 | 51.61 | |
| 4 | Rivaldo Leacock | Barbados | 1 | 0.221 | 52.16 | |
| 5 | Avotriniaina Rakotoarimiandry | Madagascar | 4 | 0.156 | 52.33 | |
| 6 | Bryce Collins | Australia | 7 | 0.152 | 52.62 | |
| 7 | Jacob Paul | United Kingdom | 8 | 0.174 | 54.36 | |
| 8 | Francesco Proietti | Italy | 2 | 0.182 | 55.28 | |

===== Semifinal 3 =====
25 July
Start time: 12:35 Temperature: 21 °C Humidity: 53%

| Rank | Name | Nationality | Lane | Reaction Time | Time | Notes |
|---|---|---|---|---|---|---|
| 1 | Ali Khamis Khamis | Bahrain | 6 | 0.164 | 49.93 | Q NJR |
| 2 | Ruan Mentz | South Africa | 2 | 0.161 | 51.03 | Q |
| 3 | Leandro Zamora | Cuba | 8 | 0.170 | 51.30 | q |
| 4 | Yi Sihang | China | 3 | 0.171 | 51.39 | q PB |
| 5 | Creve Armando Machava | Mozambique | 7 | 0.219 | 51.97 | PB |
| 6 | Kenneth Selmon | United States | 5 | 0.216 | 52.18 | |
| 7 | Jared Kerr | Canada | 1 | 0.172 | 52.91 | |
| 8 | Martin Tucek | Czech Republic | 4 | 0.159 | 53.17 | |

=== Heats ===
23 July
First 2 in each heat (Q) and the next 8 fastest (q) advance to the Semi-Finals

==== Summary ====
| Rank | Name | Nationality | Time | Notes |
|---|---|---|---|---|
| 1 | Ali Khamis Khamis | Bahrain | 51.10 | Q NJR |
| 2 | Jaheel Hyde | Jamaica | 51.60 | Q |
| 3 | Jonas Hanssen | Germany | 51.71 | Q |
| 4 | Wang Guozhong | China | 51.92 | Q |
| 5 | Avotriniaina Rakotoarimiandry | Madagascar | 51.96 | Q NJR |
| 6 | Luca Cacopardo | Italy | 51.97 | Q |
| 7 | José Luis Gaspar | Cuba | 52.00 | Q |
| 8 | Tim Holmes | United States | 52.03 | Q |
| 9 | Kenneth Selmon | United States | 52.15 | Q |
| 10 | Martin Tucek | Czech Republic | 52.17 | Q |
| 11 | Bryce Collins | Australia | 52.40 | q |
| 11 | Creve Armando Machava | Mozambique | 52.40 | q |
| 13 | Jared Kerr | Canada | 52.41 | q |
| 14 | Yi Sihang | China | 52.44 | Q |
| 15 | Lukáš Hodboď | Czech Republic | 52.45 | Q |
| 16 | Yusuke Sakanashi | Japan | 52.46 | Q |
| 17 | Leandro Zamora | Cuba | 52.50 | Q |
| 18 | Jucian Rafael Pereira | Brazil | 52.57 | q |
| 19 | Rivaldo Leacock | Barbados | 52.70 | q |
| 20 | Jacob Paul | United Kingdom | 52.79 | Q |
| 21 | Okeen Williams | Jamaica | 52.88 | Q |
| 22 | Francesco Proietti | Italy | 52.96 | q |
| 23 | Jordan Sherwood | Canada | 53.04 | q |
| 24 | Ruan Mentz | South Africa | 53.06 | q |
| 24 | Larona Obakwe Thabe | Botswana | 53.06 | |
| 26 | Derick Díaz | Puerto Rico | 53.10 | |
| 27 | Diogo Mestre | Portugal | 53.16 | |
| 28 | Wilson Bello | Venezuela | 53.23 | |
| 29 | Dany Brand | Switzerland | 53.32 | |
| 30 | Hanno Coetzer | South Africa | 53.34 | |
| 31 | Lin Chih-Hao | Chinese Taipei | 53.48 | |
| 32 | D'Mitry Charlton | Bahamas | 53.49 | |
| 33 | Christian Martínez | Puerto Rico | 53.54 | |
| 34 | Íñigo Rodríguez | Spain | 53.55 | |
| 35 | Edward Duvan Peralta | Colombia | 53.58 | |
| 36 | Enis Ünsal | Turkey | 53.60 | |
| 37 | Jean Lindsay Emilien | Mauritius | 53.66 | |
| 38 | Javier Delgado | Spain | 53.92 | |
| 39 | Stephen Kipkoech | Kenya | 53.95 | |
| 40 | Zoltán Rády | Hungary | 54.05 | |
| 41 | Salvador García | Mexico | 54.12 | |
| 42 | Enej Vrhunec | Slovenia | 54.18 | |
| 43 | Kyron McMaster | British Virgin Islands | 54.21 | |
| 43 | Iván Reyes | Mexico | 54.21 | |
| 45 | Pride Juma Lusinga | Zimbabwe | 54.25 | |
| 46 | Jerrad Mason | Barbados | 54.26 | |
| 47 | Idris Ayil Sufyani | Saudi Arabia | 54.38 | |
| 48 | Geofrey Kipkoech Cheruiyot | Kenya | 54.60 | |
| 49 | Joachim Sandberg | Norway | 54.62 | |
| 50 | Iago Martins | Brazil | 54.91 | |
| 51 | Kwon Sang-Hyeok | South Korea | 55.13 | |
| 52 | Welington Zaza | Liberia | 55.38 | |
| 53 | Andrea Ercolani Volta | San Marino | 56.11 | NR |
| 54 | Steven Medina | Ecuador | 57.32 | |
| 55 | Oneyker Aragón | Nicaragua | 57.41 | NJR |
| | Ned Justeen Azemia | Seychelles | DQ | 168.7(a) |
| | Sid-Ali Khedim | Algeria | DQ | 168.7(a) |
| | Bienvenu Sawadogo | Burkina Faso | DNS | |

==== Details ====
First 2 in each heat (Q) and the next 8 fastest (q) advance to the Semi-Finals

===== Heat 1 =====
25 July
Start time: 12:09 Temperature: 16 °C Humidity: 88%

| Rank | Name | Nationality | Lane | Reaction Time | Time | Notes |
|---|---|---|---|---|---|---|
| 1 | Jonas Hanssen | Germany | 3 | 0.158 | 51.71 | Q |
| 2 | Avotriniaina Rakotoarimiandry | Madagascar | 5 | 0.156 | 51.96 | Q NJR |
| 3 | Jared Kerr | Canada | 7 | 0.170 | 52.41 | q |
| 4 | Wilson Bello | Venezuela | 6 | 0.245 | 53.23 | |
| 5 | Lin Chih-Hao | Chinese Taipei | 8 | 0.171 | 53.48 | |
| 6 | Christian Martínez | Puerto Rico | 2 | 0.161 | 53.54 | |
| 7 | Zoltán Rády | Hungary | 4 | 0.306 | 54.05 | |

===== Heat 2 =====
25 July
Start time: 12:14 Temperature: 16 °C Humidity: 88%

| Rank | Name | Nationality | Lane | Reaction Time | Time | Notes |
|---|---|---|---|---|---|---|
| 1 | Tim Holmes | United States | 7 | 0.195 | 52.03 | Q |
| 2 | Lukáš Hodboď | Czech Republic | 5 | 0.201 | 52.45 | Q |
| 3 | Rivaldo Leacock | Barbados | 3 | 0.182 | 52.70 | q |
| 4 | Dany Brand | Switzerland | 6 | 0.220 | 53.32 | |
| 5 | Iván Reyes | Mexico | 4 | 0.213 | 54.21 | |
| 6 | Iago Martins | Brazil | 2 | 0.246 | 54.91 | |
| 7 | Steven Medina | Ecuador | 8 | 0.230 | 57.32 | |

===== Heat 3 =====
25 July
Start time: 12:20 Temperature: 16 °C Humidity: 88%

| Rank | Name | Nationality | Lane | Reaction Time | Time | Notes |
|---|---|---|---|---|---|---|
| 1 | Wang Guozhong | China | 4 | 0.156 | 51.92 | Q |
| 2 | Luca Cacopardo | Italy | 5 | 0.169 | 51.97 | Q |
| 3 | Bryce Collins | Australia | 6 | 0.164 | 52.40 | q |
| 4 | Creve Armando Machava | Mozambique | 8 | 0.220 | 52.40 | q |
| 5 | Edward Duvan Peralta | Colombia | 7 | 0.204 | 53.58 | |
| 6 | Salvador García | Mexico | 3 | 0.166 | 54.12 | |
| 7 | Enej Vrhunec | Slovenia | 2 | 0.140 | 54.18 | |

===== Heat 4 =====
25 July
Start time: 12:28 Temperature: 16 °C Humidity: 88%

| Rank | Name | Nationality | Lane | Reaction Time | Time | Notes |
|---|---|---|---|---|---|---|
| 1 | Yusuke Sakanashi | Japan | 3 | 0.157 | 52.46 | Q |
| 2 | Okeen Williams | Jamaica | 8 | 0.176 | 52.88 | Q |
| 3 | Jordan Sherwood | Canada | 4 | 0.132 | 53.04 | q |
| 4 | Javier Delgado | Spain | 7 | 0.235 | 53.92 | |
| 5 | Kwon Sang-Hyeok | South Korea | 1 | 0.256 | 55.13 | |
| 6 | Oneyker Aragón | Nicaragua | 5 | 0.251 | 57.41 | NJR |
| | Ned Justeen Azemia | Seychelles | 6 | 0.327 | DQ | 168.7(a) |
| | Sid-Ali Khedim | Algeria | 2 | 0.204 | DQ | 168.7(a) |

Note:
IAAF Rule 168.7(a) - Trailing leg

===== Heat 5 =====
25 July
Start time: 12:31 Temperature: 16 °C Humidity: 88%

| Rank | Name | Nationality | Lane | Reaction Time | Time | Notes |
|---|---|---|---|---|---|---|
| 1 | Kenneth Selmon | United States | 5 | 0.222 | 52.15 | Q |
| 2 | Yi Sihang | China | 6 | 0.178 | 52.44 | Q |
| 3 | Larona Obakwe Thabe | Botswana | 8 | 0.214 | 53.06 | |
| 4 | Hanno Coetzer | South Africa | 7 | 0.214 | 53.34 | |
| 5 | D'Mitry Charlton | Bahamas | 4 | 0.193 | 53.49 | |
| 6 | Idris Ayil Sufyani | Saudi Arabia | 3 | 0.179 | 54.38 | |
| 7 | Welington Zaza | Liberia | 2 | 0.166 | 55.38 | |

Note:
BIB 1020 Welington Zaza - Yellow Card - 162.5(b) Delaying the start

===== Heat 6 =====
25 July
Start time: 12:41 Temperature: 16 °C Humidity: 88%

| Rank | Name | Nationality | Lane | Reaction Time | Time | Notes |
|---|---|---|---|---|---|---|
| 1 | Ali Khamis Khamis | Bahrain | 8 | 0.190 | 51.10 | Q NJR |
| 2 | Jaheel Hyde | Jamaica | 7 | 0.229 | 51.60 | Q |
| 3 | Jucian Rafael Pereira | Brazil | 4 | 0.204 | 52.57 | q |
| 4 | Derick Díaz | Puerto Rico | 5 | 0.153 | 53.10 | |
| 5 | Diogo Mestre | Portugal | 3 | 0.192 | 53.16 | |
| 6 | Enis Ünsal | Turkey | 6 | 0.211 | 53.60 | |
| 7 | Geofrey Kipkoech Cheruiyot | Kenya | 2 | 0.194 | 54.60 | |

===== Heat 7 =====
25 July
Start time: 12:46 Temperature: 16 °C Humidity: 88%

| Rank | Name | Nationality | Lane | Reaction Time | Time | Notes |
|---|---|---|---|---|---|---|
| 1 | José Luis Gaspar | Cuba | 4 | 0.208 | 52.00 | Q |
| 2 | Jacob Paul | United Kingdom | 6 | 0.201 | 52.79 | Q |
| 3 | Íñigo Rodríguez | Spain | 8 | 0.175 | 53.55 | |
| 4 | Kyron McMaster | British Virgin Islands | 7 | 0.205 | 54.21 | |
| 5 | Pride Juma Lusinga | Zimbabwe | 2 | 0.161 | 54.25 | |
| 6 | Jerrad Mason | Barbados | 3 | 0.199 | 54.26 | |
| 7 | Joachim Sandberg | Norway | 5 | 0.154 | 54.62 | |

===== Heat 8 =====
25 July
Start time: 12:51 Temperature: 16 °C Humidity: 88%

| Rank | Name | Nationality | Lane | Reaction Time | Time | Notes |
|---|---|---|---|---|---|---|
| 1 | Martin Tucek | Czech Republic | 6 | 0.193 | 52.17 | Q |
| 2 | Leandro Zamora | Cuba | 7 | 0.225 | 52.50 | Q |
| 3 | Francesco Proietti | Italy | 3 | 0.179 | 52.96 | q |
| 4 | Ruan Mentz | South Africa | 2 | 0.165 | 53.06 | q |
| 5 | Jean Lindsay Emilien | Mauritius | 5 | 0.174 | 53.66 | |
| 6 | Stephen Kipkoech | Kenya | 8 | 0.205 | 53.95 | |
| 7 | Andrea Ercolani Volta | San Marino | 4 | 0.231 | 56.11 | NR |
| | Bienvenu Sawadogo | Burkina Faso | 1 | | DNS | |

== Participation ==
According to an unofficial count, 57 athletes from 43 countries participated in the event.

- Algeria (1)
- Australia (1)
- Bahamas (1)
- Bahrain (1)
- Barbados (2)
- Botswana (1)
- Brazil (2)
- British Virgin Islands (1)
- Canada (2)
- China (2)
- Chinese Taipei (1)
- Colombia (1)
- Cuba (2)
- Czech Republic (2)
- Ecuador (1)
- Germany (1)
- Hungary (1)
- Italy (2)
- Jamaica (2)
- Japan (1)
- Kenya (2)
- Liberia (1)
- Madagascar (1)
- Mauritius (1)
- Mexico (2)
- Mozambique (1)
- Nicaragua (1)
- Norway (1)
- Portugal (1)
- Puerto Rico (2)
- San Marino (1)
- Saudi Arabia (1)
- Seychelles (1)
- Slovenia (1)
- South Africa (2)
- South Korea (1)
- Spain (2)
- Switzerland (1)
- Turkey (1)
- United Kingdom (1)
- United States (2)
- Venezuela (1)
- Zimbabwe (1)
