= Byron Robinson =

American hurdler

Personal information
- Nationality: American
- Born: May 10, 1995 (age 31) Richmond, Virginia
- Height: 5 ft 10 in (178 cm)
- Weight: 163 lb (74 kg)

Sport
- Sport: Track and field
- Event: 400-meter hurdles
- College team: Texas Longhorns, Penn State Nittany Lions

Achievements and titles
- Personal best: 400 m hurdles: 48.58
- Updated on July 2016

Byron Robinson (born May 10, 1995) is an American track and field athlete who competes in the 400 metres hurdles. He holds a personal record of 48.58 seconds for the event. He was the runner-up at the United States Olympic Trials in 2016.

== Career ==
Born in Chesapeake, Virginia, he attended Western Branch High School and ran track there. He won two relay events at the New Balance Outdoor Nationals in 2013. He attended Penn State University and competed for their Penn State Nittany Lions track team in 2014. After one year, he switched to University of Texas at Austin and ran for the Texas Longhorns instead, having heard the Penn State coach was going to leave.

At the 2015 Big 12 Conference indoor championship he was runner-up in the 600 meters, then helped Texas to third in the 4 × 400-meter relay at the 2015 NCAA Division I Indoor Track and Field Championships. He faltered in the outdoor season, only managing eighth in the 400 m hurdles at the Big 12 Outdoor meet. In 2016, he ran three events at the Big 12 Indoors, winning the 600 m title, taking runner-up in the relay, as well as seventh in the 200-meter dash. At the 2016 NCAA Indoor Championships he ran the preliminaries of the 400-meter dash and was fourth in the relay.

Robinson greatly improved in the 2016 outdoor season, setting the fastest time for an American that season with 49.10 seconds in April – over a second improvement on his 400 m hurdles personal record. He won the hurdles at the Big 12 Conference in 49.39 seconds, but withdrew from the NCAA qualifiers for undisclosed reasons. Working with coach Tonja Buford-Bailey, Robinson entered the 2016 United States Olympic Trials and improved further to 48.79 seconds to finish runner-up to former world champion Kerron Clement. He beat Olympic silver medalist Michael Tinsley in the process and gained a place on the United States Olympic team. At the Olympics, Robinson advanced to the semifinals but did not qualify for the finals despite running a personal best.

In addition to his athletic career, Byron Robinson is the CEO of Robinson & Co Banking, which bills itself as "an elite boutique investment bank that provides financing for entrepreneurs and executives."

== Personal records ==
Outdoor

- 400-meter hurdles – 48.65(2016)
- 100-meter dash – 10.69 (2013)
- 200-meter dash – 20.94 (2016)
- 400-meter dash – 46.12 (2014)
- 300-meter hurdles – 36.24 (2012)

Indoor

- 55-meter dash – 6.86 (2011)
- 200-meter dash – 21.36 (2016)
- 400-meter dash – 46.27 (2016)
- 500-meter dash – 1:01.60 (2017)

All information from All Athletics
