= Boniface Tumuti =

Kenyan sprinter and hurdler (born 1992)

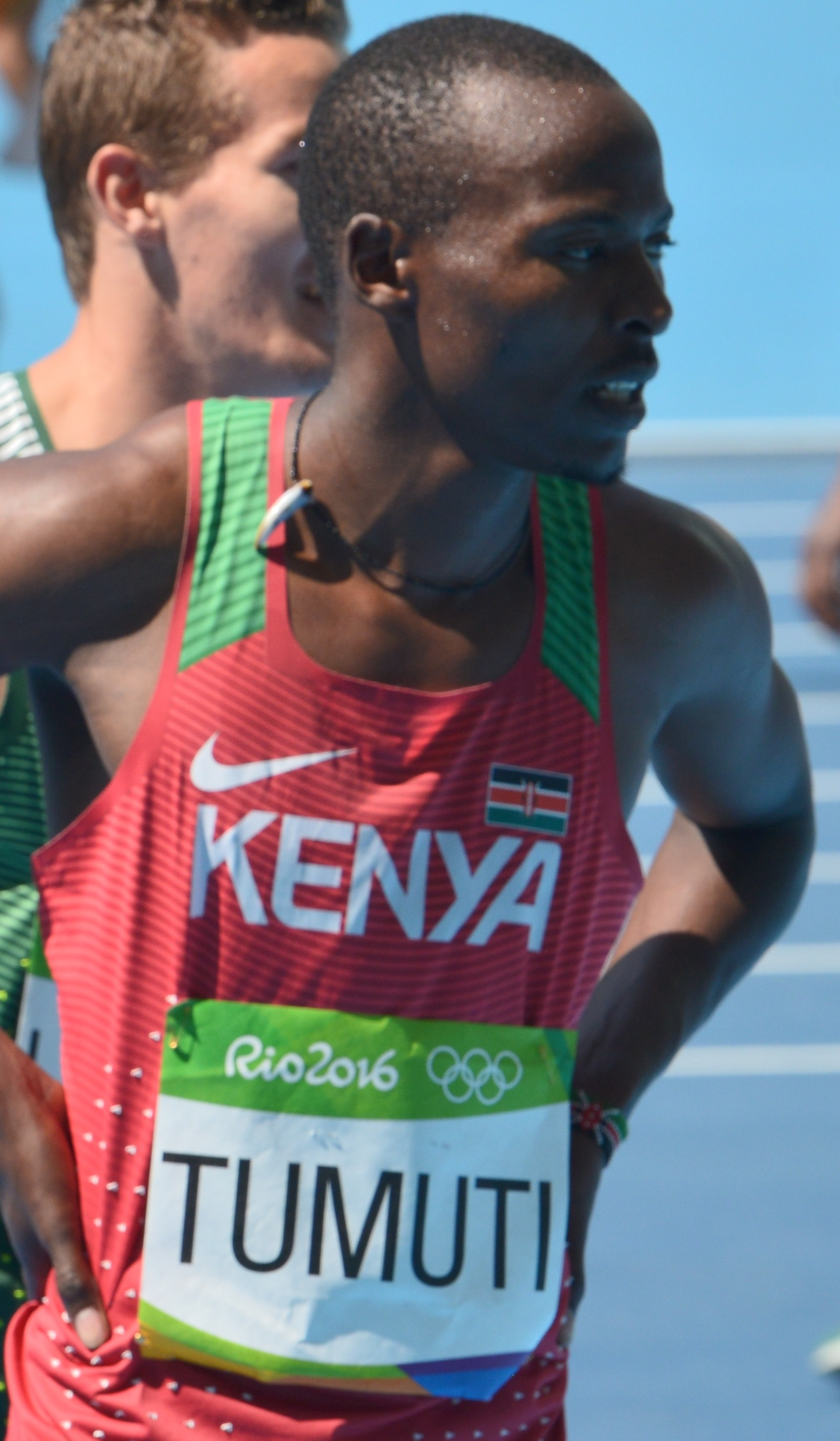
- Mucheru at the 2016 Olympics

Personal information
- Born: 2 May 1992 (age 34) Laikipia District, Kenya
- Height: 1.75 m (5 ft 9 in)
- Weight: 72 kg (159 lb)

Sport
- Country: Kenya
- Sport: Athletics
- Event(s): 400 m, 400 m hurdles

Achievements and titles
- Personal best(s): 400 m – 45.07 (2014); 400 mH – 47.78 (2016)
Medal record
Men's athletics
Representing Kenya
Olympic Games
Silver medal – second place	2016 Rio de Janeiro	400 m hurdles
African Championships
Gold medal – first place	2016 Durban	400 m hurdles
Silver medal – second place	2016 Durban	4×400 m
Bronze medal – third place	2012 Porto-Novo	400 m hurdles
Bronze medal – third place	2012 Porto-Novo	4×400 m
Bronze medal – third place	2014 Marrakesh	400 m
Bronze medal – third place	2014 Marrakesh	4×400 m
Representing Africa
Continental Cup
Gold medal – first place	2014 Marrakesh	4x400 m relay

Boniface Mucheru Tumuti (born 2 May 1992) is a Kenyan sprinter and hurdler. He competed in the 400 metres hurdles at the 2012 and 2016 Olympics and won a silver medal in 2016.

== Competition record ==
Year	Competition	Venue	Position	Event	Notes
Representing Kenya
2010	World Junior Championships	Moncton, Canada	34th (h)	400m	48.85
2010	World Junior Championships	Moncton, Canada	8th	400m hurdles	52.16
2010	World Junior Championships	Moncton, Canada	13th (h)	4 × 400 m relay	3:12.18
2010	African Championships	Nairobi, Kenya	11th (h)	400 m hurdles	51.94
2012	African Championships	Porto-Novo, Benin	3rd	400 m hurdles	49.45
2012	African Championships	Porto-Novo, Benin	3rd	4 × 400 m relay	3:04.12
2012	Olympic Games	London, United Kingdom	35th (h)	400 m hurdles	50.33
2012	Olympic Games	London, United Kingdom	–	4 × 400 m relay	DQ
2014	Continental Cup	Marrakesh, Morocco	1st	4 × 400 m relay	3:00.02
2014	IAAF World Relays	Nassau, Bahamas	15th (h)	4 × 400 m relay	3:04.69
2014	Commonwealth Games	Glasgow, United Kingdom	6th	400 m hurdles	49.99
2014	Commonwealth Games	Glasgow, United Kingdom	–	4 × 400 m relay	DQ
2014	African Championships	Marrakesh, Morocco	3rd	400 m	45.07
2014	African Championships	Marrakesh, Morocco	3rd	4 × 400 m relay	3:07.35
2015	World Championships	Beijing, China	5th	400 m hurdles	48.33
2016	African Championships	Durban, South Africa	1st	400 m hurdles	49.21
2016	African Championships	Durban, South Africa	2nd	4 × 400 m relay	3:04.25
2016	Olympic Games	Rio de Janeiro, Brazil	2nd	400 m hurdles	47.78
