= Lindsay Hanekom =

South African hurdler (born 1993)

Personal information
- Born: 15 May 1993 (age 33)
- Education: University of Pretoria
- Height: 1.78 m (5 ft 10 in)
- Weight: 66 kg (146 lb)

Sport
- Sport: Athletics
- Event: 400 metres hurdles

Lindsay Hanekom (born 15 May 1993) is a South African athlete competing in the 400 metres hurdles. He represented his country at the 2016 Summer Olympics without advancing from the first round.

His personal best in the event is 48.81 seconds set in Germiston in 2019 at the SA Athletics Championships.

== International competitions ==
Year	Competition	Venue	Position	Event	Notes
Representing South Africa
2015	Universiade	Gwangju, South Korea	8th (sf)	400 m hurdles	50.36
2015	Universiade	Gwangju, South Korea	1st (h)	4 × 400 m relay	3:04.79^{1}
2016	Olympic Games	Rio de Janeiro, Brazil	38th (h)	400 m hurdles	50.22
2019	African Games	Rabat, Morocco	5th	400 m hurdles	49.98
2019	World Championships	Doha, Qatar	35th (h)	400 m hurdles	51.71

^{1}Disqualified in the final
