= Estonia at the 2026 European Athletics Championships =

- Flag of Estonia
- WA code: EST

in Birmingham, United Kingdom 10–16 August 2026
- Competitors: 20 (11 men and 9 women)
- Medals: Gold 0 Silver 0 Bronze 0 Total 0

European Athletics Championships appearances (overview)
- 1934; 1938; 1946–1990; 1994; 1998; 2002; 2006; 2010; 2012; 2014; 2016; 2018; 2022; 2024; 2026

Other related appearances
- Soviet Union (1946–1990)

Estonia competed at the 2026 European Athletics Championships in Birmingham, United Kingdom from 10–16 August 2026.

== Results ==
Estonia entered the following athletes.

Key

- Q = Qualified for the next round
- q = Qualified for the next round as a fastest loser or, in field events, by position without achieving the qualifying target
- NR = National record
- PB = Personal best
- SB = Season best
- N/A = Round not applicable for the event

=== Men ===
Track and road events

Athlete	Event	Heat		Semifinal		Final	
Athlete	Event	Result	Rank	Result	Rank	Result	Rank
Henri Sai	100 m	10.66	19	Did not advance			
Henri Sai	200 m	20.73	7 q	20.91	7	Did not advance	
Karel Hussar	Marathon	—N/a				2:19:42	39
Tiidrek Nurme	Marathon	—N/a				2:18:18 SB	31

Field events

Athlete	Event	Qualification		Final	
Athlete	Event	Distance	Position	Distance	Position
Henri Apri	Pole vault	NM		Did not advance	
Robert Kompus	Pole vault	5.45	16	Did not advance	
Viktor Morozov	Triple jump	15.85	17	Did not advance	
Adam Kelly	Hammer throw	71.63	22	Did not advance	

Combined events – Decathlon

Athlete	Event	100 m	LJ	SP	HJ	400 m	110H	DT	PV	JT	1500 m	Final	Rank
Johannes Erm	Result	10.88 SB	7.49 SB	14.55 SB	1.99 SB	48.07 SB	DNF						
Johannes Erm	Points	888	932	762	794	906	DNF						
Risto Lillemets	Result	11.09	6.97	15.47	1.96 SB	49.23	14.64	46.37	4.80	55.89	4:32.53 SB	8026	12
Risto Lillemets	Points	841	807	819	767	850	894	795	849	676	728	8026	12
Rasmus Roosleht	Result	10.91	6.95	15.88	1.93	47.84 PB	14.72	45.19	4.80	64.58	4:36.34	8199	7
Rasmus Roosleht	Points	881	802	844	740	917	884	771	849	807	704	8199	7
Karel Tilga	Result	11.22	7.28	15.46	2.02 SB	49.10 SB	15.04	49.14	4.90 SB	60.05	4:24.65 SB	8286	5
Karel Tilga	Points	812	881	818	822	857	845	852	880	739	780	8286	5

=== Women ===
Track and road events

Athlete	Event	Heat		Semifinal		Final	
Athlete	Event	Result	Rank	Result	Rank	Result	Rank
Ann Marii Kivikas	100 m	11.35 =NR	16	Did not advance			
Ann Marii Kivikas	200 m	23.16 SB	4 q	23.34	6	Did not advance	
Liis-Grete Hussar	Marathon	—N/a				2:41:17	39
Viola Hambidge	400 m hurdles	56.66	17	Did not advance			
Laura Maasik	3000 m steeplechase	9:57.06	14	—N/a		Did not advance	

Field events

Athlete	Event	Qualification		Final	
Athlete	Event	Distance	Position	Distance	Position
Karmen Bruus	High jump	1.91 SB	9 Q	1.83	13
Allika Inkeri Moser	Pole vault	4.10	25	Did not advance	
Marleen Mülla	Pole vault	4.40	8 q	4.45	7
Liisa-Maria Lusti	Long jump	NM		Did not advance	
Gedly Tugi	Javelin throw	56.09	14	Did not advance	
