= Mägi =

Family name

Mägi is a surname of Estonian origin. The word "mägi" in Estonian means "mountain" or "hill". People with the surname Mägi include:

- Anne Mägi (born 1960), Estonian track and field athlete and coach
- Artur Mägi (1904–1981), Estonian legal scientist
- Arvi Mägi (born 1949), Estonian actor and theatre director
- Arvo Mägi (1913–2004), Estonian writer and journalist
- Ester Mägi (1922–2021), Estonian composer
- Harald Mägi (1932–2012), Estonian politician
- Konrad Mägi (1878–1925), Estonian landscape painter
- Laine Mägi (born 1959), Estonian actress and dancer
- Liisu Mägi (1831–1926), Estonian folk singer
- Leino Mägi (born 1955), Estonian politician
- Maarja Johanna Mägi (born 1997), actress
- Marin Mägi (born 1982), Estonian actress
- Maris Mägi (born 1987), Estonian sprinter
- Paul Mägi (born 1953), Estonian conductor
- Taivo Mägi (born 1960), Estonian track and field athlete and coach
- Rasmus Mägi (born 1992), Estonian hurdler
- Tõnis Mägi (born 1948), Estonian singer, guitarist, composer and actor
- Voldemar Mägi (1914–1954), Estonian wrestler

== See also ==
- Magi (disambiguation)
- Mäki, a Finnish word and surname meaning "hill"
