= Estonia at the 2012 European Athletics Championships =

- WA code: EST
- National federation: Eesti Kergejõustikuliit
- Website: www.ekjl.ee

in Helsinki
- Competitors: 21
- Medals Ranked 22nd: Gold 0 Silver 1 Bronze 0 Total 1

European Athletics Championships appearances (overview)
- 1934; 1938; 1946–1990; 1994; 1998; 2002; 2006; 2010; 2012; 2014; 2016; 2018; 2022; 2024; 2026

Other related appearances
- Soviet Union (1946–1990)

Estonia was represented by 21 athletes at the 2012 European Athletics Championships held in Helsinki, Finland.

== Medals ==
Medal	Name	Event	Date
Silver	Gerd Kanter	Men's discus throw	30 June

== Results ==
=== Men ===
==== Track ====
Event	Athletes	Heats		Semifinal		Final	
Event	Athletes	Result	Rank	Result	Rank	Result	Rank
100 m	Richard Pulst	10.57	23 Q	10.57	21	Did not advance	
200m	Marek Niit	20.93	14 Q	21.44	21	Did not advance	
5000 m	Tiidrek Nurme	—N/a				13:51.29	16
400m hurdles	Rasmus Mägi	50.61	14 Q	49.54	3 Q NR	50.01	5
3000m steeplechase	Kaur Kivistik	8:36.10	13 q	—N/a		8:58.02	15

==== Combined ====
Decathlon	Event	Tarmo Riitmuru		
Decathlon	Event	Results	Points	Rank
	100 m	11.50	753	25
	Long jump	6.80	767	22
	Shot put	13.75	713	13
	High jump	1.97	776	13
	400 m	51.51	746	21
	110 m hurdles	14.78	876	14
	Discus throw	42.75	721	7
	Pole vault	5.00	810	2
	Javelin throw	54.81	660	12
	1500 m	4:33.50	722	9
Final			7644	14

==== Field ====
Event	Athletes	Qualification		Final	
Event	Athletes	Result	Rank	Result	Rank
High jump	Karl Lumi	2.15	25	Did not advance	
Long jump	Rain Kask	7.50	27	Did not advance	
Triple jump	Igor Sjunin	16.24	20	Did not advance	
Discus throw	Märt Israel	60.59	17	Did not advance	
Discus throw	Gerd Kanter	64.85	6 q	66.53	2nd place, silver medalist(s)
Javelin throw	Marko Jänes	74.74	19	Did not advance	
Javelin throw	Tanel Laanmäe	71.87	85	Did not advance	
Javelin throw	Risto Mätas	79.34	8 q	75.85	10

=== Women ===
==== Track ====
Event	Athletes	Heats		Semifinal		Final	
Event	Athletes	Result	Rank	Result	Rank	Result	Rank
400 m	Maris Mägi	Disqualified		Did not advance			

==== Combined ====
Heptathlon	Event	Grit Šadeiko		
Heptathlon	Event	Results	Points	Rank
	100 m hurdles	13.36	1071	2
	High jump	1.77	941	9
	Shot put	12.56	698	15
	200 m	24.10	971	1
	Long jump	6.18	905	8
	Javelin throw	45.38	771	9
	800 m	DNS		
Final			DNF	

==== Field ====
Event	Athletes	Qualification		Final	
Event	Athletes	Result	Rank	Result	Rank
High jump	Eleriin Haas	1.83	18	Did not advance	
High jump	Anna Iljuštšenko	1.87	13	Did not advance	
Pole vault	Lembi Vaher	3.95	27	Did not advance	
Discus throw	Kätlin Tõllasson	48.55	25	Did not advance	
Javelin throw	Raine Kuningas	53.65	18	Did not advance	
