= Estonia at the 2018 European Athletics Championships =

- WA code: EST
- National federation: Estonian Athletic Association
- Website: ekjl.ee

in Berlin
- Competitors: 22 (13 men and 9 women) in 14 events
- Medals Ranked 25th: Gold 0 Silver 0 Bronze 1 Total 1

European Athletics Championships appearances (overview)
- 1934; 1938; 1946–1990; 1994; 1998; 2002; 2006; 2010; 2012; 2014; 2016; 2018; 2022; 2024

Other related appearances
- Soviet Union (1946–1990)

Estonia competed at the 2018 European Athletics Championships in Berlin, Germany, from 6–12 August 2018. A delegation of 22 athletes were sent to represent the country.

== Medalists ==
Medal	Name	Event	Date
Bronze	Magnus Kirt	Men's javelin throw	9 August

== Results ==
Men
Track and road

Athletes	Event	Heats		Semifinal		Final	
Athletes	Event	Result	Rank	Result	Rank	Result	Rank
Tony Nõu	400 metres	47.19	26	Did not advance			
Tiidrek Nurme	Marathon	—				2:15:16 PB	9
Roman Fosti	Marathon	—				2:17:57 SB	17
Rasmus Mägi	400 metres hurdles	Bye		48.80 SB	3 Q	48.75 SB	6
Jaak-Heinrich Jagor	400 metres hurdles	50.47	7 Q	50.41	21	Did not advance	
Kaur Kivistik	3000 metres steeplechase	8:28.84 NR	6 Q	—		8:40.32	9

Field events

Athletes	Event	Qualification		Final	
Athletes	Event	Distance	Position	Distance	Position
Gerd Kanter	Discus throw	64.18	5 Q	64.34	5
Martin Kupper	Discus throw	62.13	13	Did not advance	
Magnus Kirt	Javelin throw	83.15	5 Q	85.96	3rd place, bronze medalist(s)
Tanel Laanmäe	Javelin throw	77.21	15	Did not advance	

Combined events – Decathlon

Athlete	Event	100 m	LJ	SP	HJ	400 m	110H	DT	PV	JT	1500 m	Final	Rank
Maicel Uibo	Result	11.31	7.27	14.61	2.02	50.18 PB	14.57	45.33	5.10	DNS	-	DNF	-
Maicel Uibo	Points	793	878	766	822	806	902	774	941	0	-	DNF	-
Karl Robert Saluri	Result	10.68	7.50	14.54 PB	1.87	48.26	15.20	NM	DNS	-	-	DNF	-
Karl Robert Saluri	Points	933	935	761	687	897	825	0	0	-	-	DNF	-
Karel Tilga	Result	11.26	7.25	14.20	2.02	50.12	15.27	43.42	DNS	-	-	DNF	-
Karel Tilga	Points	804	874	741	822	809	817	734	0	-	-	DNF	-

Women
Field events

Athletes	Event	Qualification		Final	
Athletes	Event	Distance	Position	Distance	Position
Eleriin Haas	High jump	1.76	25	Did not advance	
Ksenija Balta	Long jump	6.63 =SB	10 q	6.49	6
Tähti Alver	Triple jump	13.76	22	Did not advance	
Merilyn Uudmäe	Triple jump	13.74	24	Did not advance	
Kätlin Tõllasson	Discus throw	48.58	29	Did not advance	
Liina Laasma	Javelin throw	NM	-	Did not advance	
Anna Maria Orel	Hammer throw	67.22	16	Did not advance	

Combined events – Heptathlon

Athlete	Event	100H	HJ	SP	200 m	LJ	JT	800 m	Final	Rank
Mari Klaup	Result	14.00	1.73	11.49	26.43	NM	42.96	DNS	DNF	-
Mari Klaup	Points	978	891	627	760	0	724	0	DNF	-
Grit Šadeiko	Result	13.37 SB	1.73	12.50	24.61	5.90	48.11 SB	2:18.78	6060	12
Grit Šadeiko	Points	1069	891	694	923	819	824	840	6060	12
