= 2013 European Athletics U23 Championships – Men's 400 metres hurdles =

The men's 400 metres hurdles event at the 2013 European Athletics U23 Championships was held in Tampere, Finland, at Ratina Stadium on 11, 12 and 13 July.

== Medalists ==
Gold	Emir Bekrić; Serbia
Silver	Sebastian Rodger; United Kingdom
Bronze	Rasmus Mägi; Estonia

== Results ==
=== Final ===
13 July 2013

Rank	Name	Nationality	Lane	Reaction Time	Time	Notes
1st place, gold medalist(s)	Emir Bekrić	Serbia	4	0.218	48.76	NR
2nd place, silver medalist(s)	Sebastian Rodger	United Kingdom	5	0.168	49.19	PB
3rd place, bronze medalist(s)	Rasmus Mägi	Estonia	6	0.146	49.19	NR
4	Niall Flannery	United Kingdom	3	0.175	49.76	
5	Michal Brož	Czech Republic	7	0.167	49.78	PB
6	Varg Königsmark	Germany	1	0.233	49.90	SB
7	Øyvind Kjerpeset	Norway	2	0.137	50.01	
8	Thomas Barr	Ireland	8	0.189	50.14	

=== Semifinals ===
Qualified: First 3 in each heat (Q) and 2 best performers (q) advance to the Final

==== Summary ====
Rank	Name	Nationality	Time	Notes
1	Sebastian Rodger	United Kingdom	49.57	Q PB
2	Rasmus Mägi	Estonia	49.68	Q
3	Thomas Barr	Ireland	49.78	Q PB
4	Emir Bekrić	Serbia	49.83	Q
5	Øyvind Kjerpeset	Norway	50.10	q
6	Niall Flannery	United Kingdom	50.13	Q
7	Michal Brož	Czech Republic	50.36	Q
8	Varg Königsmark	Germany	50.44	q
9	Felix Franz	Germany	50.55	
10	Denis Kudryavtsev	Russia	50.84	
11	Jesper Arts	Netherlands	50.95	
12	Erik Heggen	Belgium	51.04	
13	Stéphane Yato	France	51.06	
14	Oleg Mironov	Russia	51.88	
15	Lorenzo Veroli	Italy	51.99	
	Jason Harvey	Ireland	DQ	R 162.7

==== Details ====
===== Semifinal 1 =====
12 July 2013 / 17:25

Rank	Name	Nationality	Lane	Reaction Time	Time	Notes
1	Emir Bekrić	Serbia	4	0.225	49.83	Q
2	Niall Flannery	United Kingdom	6	0.166	50.13	Q
3	Michal Brož	Czech Republic	7	0.158	50.36	Q
4	Varg Königsmark	Germany	3	0.227	50.44	q
5	Stéphane Yato	France	8	0.201	51.06	
6	Oleg Mironov	Russia	1	0.182	51.88	
7	Lorenzo Veroli	Italy	2	0.221	51.99	
	Jason Harvey	Ireland	5		F1	DQ R 162.7

===== Semifinal 2 =====
12 July 2013 / 17:33

Rank	Name	Nationality	Lane	Reaction Time	Time	Notes
1	Sebastian Rodger	United Kingdom	4	0.176	49.57	Q PB
2	Rasmus Mägi	Estonia	5	0.159	49.68	Q
3	Thomas Barr	Ireland	3	0.217	49.78	Q NUR
4	Øyvind Kjerpeset	Norway	6	0.148	50.10	q
5	Felix Franz	Germany	8	0.190	50.55	
6	Denis Kudryavtsev	Russia	7	0.199	50.84	
7	Jesper Arts	Netherlands	1	0.191	50.95	
8	Erik Heggen	Belgium	2	0.209	51.04	

=== Heats ===
Qualified: First 3 in each heat (Q) and 4 best performers (q) advance to the Semifinals

==== Summary ====
Rank	Name	Nationality	Time	Notes
1	Niall Flannery	United Kingdom	49.97	Q
2	Thomas Barr	Ireland	50.11	Q
3	Varg Königsmark	Germany	50.23	Q
4	Michal Brož	Czech Republic	50.30	Q PB
5	Rasmus Mägi	Estonia	50.34	Q
6	Emir Bekrić	Serbia	50.48	Q
7	Jason Harvey	Ireland	50.65	Q
8	Oleg Mironov	Russia	50.74	q
9	Sebastian Rodger	United Kingdom	50.87	Q
10	Erik Heggen	Belgium	50.91	q PB
11	Jesper Arts	Netherlands	50.93	q
11	Øyvind Kjerpeset	Norway	50.93	Q
11	Stéphane Yato	France	50.93	Q SB
14	Lorenzo Veroli	Italy	50.99	q PB
15	Denis Kudryavtsev	Russia	51.06	Q
16	Damian Krupa	Poland	51.09	
17	Felix Franz	Germany	51.10	Q
18	Eusebio Haliti	Italy	51.25	
18	Davide Piccolo	Italy	51.25	PB
20	Jonathan Puemi	Switzerland	51.26	
21	Stef Vanhaeren	Belgium	51.35	
22	Marius Bakke Støle	Norway	51.68	
23	Máté Koroknai	Hungary	51.91	
24	Thomas Kain	Austria	52.11	
25	Peter Hribaršek	Slovenia	52.71	
26	Mitja Lindič	Slovenia	52.89	
27	Paweł Gwiazdoń	Poland	53.08	
28	Don-Zheni Ekoebve	Finland	53.30	
29	Anatoliy Sinyanskyy	Ukraine	53.44	
30	Dmytro Bezpamyatnyy	Ukraine	53.96	
31	Maor Szeged	Israel	54.99	
	Jack Green	United Kingdom	DNF	

==== Details ====
===== Heat 1 =====
11 July 2013 / 13:50

Rank	Name	Nationality	Lane	Reaction Time	Time	Notes
1	Niall Flannery	United Kingdom	2	0.161	49.97	Q
2	Varg Königsmark	Germany	1	0.208	50.23	Q
3	Michal Brož	Czech Republic	4	0.167	50.30	Q PB
4	Oleg Mironov	Russia	8	0.164	50.74	q
5	Erik Heggen	Belgium	3	0.204	50.91	q PB
6	Lorenzo Veroli	Italy	7	0.213	50.99	q PB
7	Marius Bakke Støle	Norway	5	0.159	51.68	
8	Dmytro Bezpamyatnyy	Ukraine	6	0.274	53.96	

===== Heat 2 =====
11 July 2013 / 13:58

Rank	Name	Nationality	Lane	Reaction Time	Time	Notes
1	Sebastian Rodger	United Kingdom	3	0.248	50.87	Q
2	Øyvind Kjerpeset	Norway	6	0.135	50.93	Q
3	Felix Franz	Germany	7	0.220	51.10	Q
4	Stef Vanhaeren	Belgium	1	0.162	51.35	
5	Máté Koroknai	Hungary	8	0.209	51.91	
6	Paweł Gwiazdoń	Poland	2	0.215	53.08	
7	Don-Zheni Ekoebve	Finland	5	0.157	53.30	
8	Anatoliy Sinyanskyy	Ukraine	4	0.249	53.44	

===== Heat 3 =====
11 July 2013 / 14:06

Rank	Name	Nationality	Lane	Reaction Time	Time	Notes
1	Emir Bekrić	Serbia	2	0.157	50.48	Q
2	Jason Harvey	Ireland	3	0.232	50.65	Q
3	Stéphane Yato	France	5	0.158	50.93	Q SB
4	Jesper Arts	Netherlands	6	0.183	50.93	q
5	Eusebio Haliti	Italy	4	0.188	51.25	
6	Thomas Kain	Austria	1	0.219	52.11	
7	Mitja Lindič	Slovenia	8	0.160	52.89	
8	Maor Szeged	Israel	7	0.171	54.99	

===== Heat 4 =====
11 July 2013 / 14:14

Rank	Name	Nationality	Lane	Reaction Time	Time	Notes
1	Thomas Barr	Ireland	1	0.182	50.11	Q
2	Rasmus Mägi	Estonia	7	0.157	50.34	Q
3	Denis Kudryavtsev	Russia	5	0.173	51.06	Q
4	Damian Krupa	Poland	3	0.216	51.09	
5	Davide Piccolo	Italy	6	0.197	51.25	PB
6	Jonathan Puemi	Switzerland	8	0.153	51.26	
7	Peter Hribaršek	Slovenia	4	0.156	52.71	
	Jack Green	United Kingdom	2	0.206	DNF	

== Participation ==
According to an unofficial count, 32 athletes from 20 countries participated in the event.

- Austria (1)
- Belgium (2)
- Czech Republic (1)
- Estonia (1)
- Finland (1)
- France (1)
- Germany (2)
- Hungary (1)
- Ireland (2)
- Israel (1)
- Italy (3)
- Netherlands (1)
- Norway (2)
- Poland (2)
- Russia (2)
- Serbia (1)
- Slovenia (2)
- Switzerland (1)
- Ukraine (2)
- United Kingdom (3)
