= 2012 World Junior Championships in Athletics – Men's 400 metres hurdles =

The men's 400 metres hurdles at the 2012 World Junior Championships in Athletics was held at the Estadi Olímpic Lluís Companys on 11–13 July.

== Medalists ==
Gold	Silver	Bronze
Eric Futch; United States	Takahiro Matsumoto; Japan	Ibrahim Mohammed Saleh; Saudi Arabia

== Records ==
Prior to the competition, the existing world junior and championship records were as follows.

World Junior Record	Danny Harris (USA)	48.02	Los Angeles, United States	17 June 1984
Championship Record	Kerron Clement (USA)	48.51	Grosseto, Italy	16 July 2004
World Junior Leading	Felix Franz (GER)	50.48	Regensburg, Germany	2 June 2012
Broken records during the 2012 World Junior Championships in Athletics
World Junior Leading	Eric Futch (USA)	50.24	Barcelona, Spain	13 July 2012

== Results ==
=== Heats ===
Qualification: first 3 of each heat (Q) plus the 3 fastest times (q) qualified

Rank	Heat	Lane	Name	Nationality	Time	Note
1	7	3	Gregory Coleman	United States	50.95	Q, PB
2	1	5	Mitja Lindic	Slovenia	51.16	Q, PB
3	4	9	Takahiro Matsumoto	Japan	51.26	Q, SB
4	3	5	Ibrahim Mohammed Saleh	Saudi Arabia	51.36	Q
5	4	4	Javarn Gallimore	Jamaica	51.40	Q
6	7	9	Shavon Barnes	Jamaica	51.52	Q
7	1	6	Oskari Mörö	Finland	51.65	Q
8	6	9	Shota Madokoro	Japan	51.67	Q
9	3	9	Riadh Sayeh	Tunisia	51.68	Q, PB
10	1	3	Felix Franz	Germany	51.78	Q
11	5	6	Eric Futch	United States	51.82	Q
12	7	8	Max Scheible	Germany	51.82	Q, SB
13	6	6	Gamal Abdelnasir Abubaker	Qatar	51.93	Q, PB
14	3	4	Durgesh Kumar	India	51.99	Q
15	2	8	Brandon Benjamin	Trinidad and Tobago	52.01	Q
16	3	6	Máté Koroknai	Hungary	52.16	q, SB
17	6	3	José Fernando Martínez	Mexico	52.21	Q
18	2	9	Timofey Chalyy	Russia	52.27	Q
19	5	8	Kion Joseph	Barbados	52.29	Q
20	5	7	Francis Wanguo Mutunga	Kenya	52.31	Q
21	6	4	Marius Bakken Støle	Norway	52.37	q
22	5	9	Ben Kiely	Ireland	52.39	q, PB
23	1	8	Wesley Diego Martins	Brazil	52.41	
24	2	2	Thomas Kain	Austria	52.42	Q
25	4	8	William Mbevi Mutunga	Kenya	52.44	Q
26	1	7	Tramaine Maloney	Barbados	52.56	
27	3	7	Oleg Mironov	Russia	52.56	
28	5	5	Ioánnis Loulás	Greece	52.61	
29	2	3	Joni Vainio-Kaila	Finland	52.71	PB
30	7	2	Andri Aguirre	Venezuela	52.71	
31	1	9	Paolo Spezzati	Italy	52.73	PB
32	4	6	Ramfis Vega	Puerto Rico	52.77	
33	7	5	Gatkuath Chol	Australia	52.78	
34	4	2	Erick Armando Valverde	Mexico	52.85	
35	7	6	Mustafa Ammar Shaheen	Iraq	52.94	
36	2	4	Taariq Solomons	South Africa	52.95	
37	7	7	Enrico Tirel	Italy	53.00	PB
38	4	5	Marcin Młynarczyk	Poland	53.06	
39	3	8	Dmytro Bezpamyatnyy	Ukraine	53.11	
40	3	3	Phil Simms	New Zealand	53.26	
41	1	4	Ju Sang-min	South Korea	53.29	
42	2	6	Markus Loftås	Norway	53.29	SB
43	6	5	Alfredo Sepúlveda	Chile	53.43	
44	2	5	Gerald Drummond	Costa Rica	53.46	
45	2	7	Sergio Fernández	Spain	53.50	
46	5	3	Enrique González	Spain	53.74	
47	4	3	Ali Khamis Khamis	Bahrain	53.90	
48	7	4	Yahya Ibrahim Barnawi	Saudi Arabia	54.03	SB
49	6	8	Tamás Kovári	Hungary	54.13	
50	4	7	Christopher Green	Canada	54.51	
51	5	4	Alejandro Díaz	Venezuela	55.65	
52	6	7	Bernardus Pretorius	South Africa	57.21	

=== Semi-final ===
Qualification: The first 2 of each heat (Q) and the 2 fastest times (q) qualified

Rank	Heat	Lane	Name	Nationality	Time	Note
1	2	6	Javarn Gallimore	Jamaica	50.45	Q, WJL
2	1	9	Felix Franz	Germany	50.66	Q
3	1	4	Takahiro Matsumoto	Japan	50.76	Q, PB
4	3	6	Eric Futch	United States	50.77	Q
5	2	9	Timofey Chalyy	Russia	50.80	Q, PB
6	3	5	Mitja Lindic	Slovenia	50.81	Q, PB
7	1	7	Oskari Mörö	Finland	50.89	q, PB
8	1	6	Ibrahim Mohammed Saleh	Saudi Arabia	51.11	q, PB
9	2	5	Gregory Coleman	United States	51.12	
10	3	7	Shota Madokoro	Japan	51.15	
11	1	5	Shavon Barnes	Jamaica	51.18	
12	3	4	Riadh Sayeh	Tunisia	51.36	NJ
13	3	9	Max Scheible	Germany	51.43	PB
14	3	8	Kion Joseph	Bahamas	51.51	PB
14	3	2	Thomas Kain	Austria	51.51	PB
16	1	8	Durgesh Kumar	India	51.52	
17	2	3	Francis Wanguo Mutunga	Kenya	51.65	
18	1	2	William Mbevi Mutunga	Kenya	51.70	
19	2	7	Brandon Benjamin	Trinidad and Tobago	51.93	
20	3	3	Marius Bakken Støle	Norway	52.33	
21	1	3	Máté Koroknai	Hungary	52.51	
22	2	8	José Fernando Martínez	Mexico	52.67	
23	2	2	Ben Kiely	Ireland	53.06	
–	2	4	Gamal Abdelnasir Abubaker	Qatar	DNF	

=== Final ===
Rank	Lane	Name	Nationality	Time	Note
1st place, gold medalist(s)	6	Eric Futch	United States	50.24	WJL
2nd place, silver medalist(s)	5	Takahiro Matsumoto	Japan	50.41	PB
3rd place, bronze medalist(s)	4	Ibrahim Mohammed Saleh	Saudi Arabia	50.47	PB
4	7	Javarn Gallimore	Jamaica	50.49	
5	3	Felix Franz	Germany	50.80	
6	9	Oskari Mörö	Finland	50.80	PB
7	8	Timofey Chalyy	Russia	51.17	
8	2	Mitja Lindic	Slovenia	51.26	

== Participation ==
According to an unofficial count, 52 athletes from 36 countries participated in the event.

- Australia (1)
- Austria (1)
- Bahrain (1)
- Barbados (2)
- Brazil (1)
- Canada (1)
- Chile (1)
- Costa Rica (1)
- Finland (2)
- Germany (2)
- Greece (1)
- Hungary (2)
- India (1)
- Iraq (1)
- Ireland (1)
- Italy (2)
- Jamaica (2)
- Japan (2)
- Kenya (2)
- Mexico (2)
- New Zealand (1)
- Norway (2)
- Poland (1)
- Puerto Rico (1)
- Qatar (1)
- Russia (2)
- Saudi Arabia (2)
- Slovenia (1)
- South Africa (2)
- South Korea (1)
- Spain (2)
- Trinidad and Tobago (1)
- Tunisia (1)
- Ukraine (1)
- United States (2)
- Venezuela (2)
