= 2015 European Athletics U23 Championships – Men's 400 metres hurdles =

The men's 400 metres hurdles event at the 2015 European Athletics U23 Championships was held in Tallinn, Estonia, at Kadriorg Stadium on 10 and 12 July.

== Medalists ==
Gold	Patryk Dobek; Poland
Silver	Jussi Kanervo; Finland
Bronze	Nicolai Hartling; Denmark

== Results ==
=== Final ===
12 July

Rank	Name	Nationality	Reaction Time	Time	Notes
1st place, gold medalist(s)	Patryk Dobek	Poland	0.165	48.84	PB
2nd place, silver medalist(s)	Jussi Kanervo	Finland	0.148	49.66	PB
3rd place, bronze medalist(s)	Nicolai Hartling	Denmark	0.147	50.02	NR NUR PB
4	Oleg Mironov	Russia	0.160	50.07	SB
5	Aleksandr Skorobogatko	Russia	0.168	50.09	SB
6	Oskari Mörö	Finland	0.151	50.27	
7	Máté Koroknai	Hungary	0.198	50.44	SB
8	Sérgio Fernández	Spain	0.172	66.32	

=== Heats ===
10 July

==== Heat 1 ====
Rank	Name	Nationality	Reaction Time	Time	Notes
1	Patryk Dobek	Poland	0.175	49.83	Q
2	Aleksandr Skorobogatko	Russia	0.159	50.26	Q
3	Sérgio Fernández	Spain	0.184	50.35	q
4	Thomas Kain	Austria	0.174	51.26	
5	Maor Szeged	Israel	0.164	51.57	PB
6	Maksym Lyabin	Ukraine	0.144	51.74	
7	Lorenzo Vergani	Italy	0.182	52.05	

==== Heat 2 ====
Rank	Name	Nationality	Reaction Time	Time	Notes
1	Jussi Kanervo	Finland	0.146	50.42	Q
2	Nicolai Hartling	Denmark	0.154	50.73	Q
3	Oleg Mironov	Russia	0.170	51.06	q
4	Danylo Danylenko	Ukraine	0.156	51.65	
5	Mikhail Ramanau	Belarus	0.196	51.93	
6	Mattia Contini	Italy	0.165	52.08	
7	Filip Pestić	Slovenia	0.161	52.86	
8	Andrea Ercolani Volta	San Marino	0.168	54.72	

==== Heat 3 ====
Rank	Name	Nationality	Reaction Time	Time	Notes
1	Oskari Mörö	Finland	0.169	50.69	Q
2	Máté Koroknai	Hungary	0.193	50.88	Q
3	Timofey Chalyy	Russia	0.191	51.12	
4	Mickaël Bertil	France	0.158	51.75	
5	Jiří Stehno	Czech Republic	0.182	52.05	
6	Francesco Proietti	Italy	0.150	52.78	
7	Oleksiy Matskevych	Ukraine	0.179	53.36	

== Participation ==
According to an unofficial count, 22 athletes from 15 countries participated in the event.

- Austria (1)
- Belarus (1)
- Czech Republic (1)
- Denmark (1)
- Finland (2)
- France (1)
- Hungary (1)
- Israel (1)
- Italy (3)
- Poland (1)
- Russia (3)
- San Marino (1)
- Slovenia (1)
- Spain (1)
- Ukraine (3)
