= Estonia at the European Athletics Championships =

- WA code: EST
- National federation: Eesti Kergejõustikuliit
- Website: www.ekjl.ee
- Medals Ranked 31st: Gold 4 Silver 6 Bronze 5 Total 15

European Athletics Championships appearances (overview)
- 1934; 1938; 1946–1990; 1994; 1998; 2002; 2006; 2010; 2012; 2014; 2016; 2018; 2022; 2024

Other related appearances
- Soviet Union (1946–1990)

Estonia has participated at the European Athletics Championships since the inaugural 1934 year, but after the country was invaded and occupied by the Soviet Union in 1940, Estonia didn't participate until it regained independence. Since 1994, Estonia has participated in every championship.

== Summary ==
Championships	Athletes	Gold	Silver	Bronze	Total	Rank
1934 Turin	7	1	0	1	2	8th
1938 Paris	7	1	0	0	1	10th
1946–1990	Did not participate					
1994 Helsinki	17	0	0	0	0	–
1998 Budapest	?	1	0	0	1	15th
2002 Munich	14	0	2	0	2	20th
2006 Gothenburg	21	0	1	1	2	22nd
2010 Barcelona	17	0	0	0	0	–
2012 Helsinki	21	0	1	0	1	23rd
2014 Zurich	26	0	2	0	2	17th
2016 Amsterdam	23	0	0	1	1	27th
2018 Berlin	22	0	0	1	1	25th
2022 Munich	12	0	0	1	1	28th
2024 Rome	19	1	0	0	1	17th
Total		4	6	5	15	31st

== Medalists ==
As of 2024.

Name	Championships	Event	Medal
Erki Nool	1998 Budapest	Men's decathlon	Gold
Erki Nool	2002 Munich	Men's decathlon	Silver
Arnold Viiding	1934 Turin	Men's shot put	Gold
Aleksander Kreek	1938 Paris	Men's shot put	Gold
Johannes Erm	2024 Rome	Men's decathlon	Gold
Gerd Kanter	2006 Gothenburg	Men's discus throw	Silver
Gerd Kanter	2012 Helsinki	Men's discus throw	Silver
Gerd Kanter	2014 Zürich	Men's discus throw	Silver
Gerd Kanter	2016 Amsterdam	Men's discus throw	Bronze
Pavel Loskutov	2002 Munich	Men's marathon	Silver
Rasmus Mägi	2014 Zurich	Men's 400 metres hurdles	Silver
Gustav Sule	1934 Turin	Men's javelin throw	Bronze
Aleksander Tammert	2006 Gothenburg	Men's discus throw	Bronze
Magnus Kirt	2018 Berlin	Men's javelin throw	Bronze
Janek Õiglane	2022 Munich	Men's decathlon	Bronze

== Statistics ==
As of 2018.

- Youngest competitor
  - Men: Marek Niit – 19 years 3 days – 4x100m – 2006
  - Women: Kätlin Piirimäe – 18 years 280 days – shot put – 2014
- Youngest medalist
  - Rasmus Mägi – 22 years 103 days – 400m hurdles – 2nd – 2014
- Oldest competitor
  - Men: Gerd Kanter – 39 years 94 days – discus throw – 2018
  - Women: Eha Rünne – 39 years 73 days – discus throw – 2002
- Oldest medalist
  - Gerd Kanter – 37 years 64 days – discus throw – 3rd – 2016

== See also ==
- Estonia at the World Championships in Athletics
