= Estonia at the 2016 European Athletics Championships =

- WA code: EST
- National federation: Eesti Kergejõustikuliit
- Website: www.ekjl.ee

in Amsterdam
- Competitors: 24 (16 men and 8 women) in 16 events
- Medals Ranked 27th: Gold 0 Silver 0 Bronze 1 Total 1

European Athletics Championships appearances (overview)
- 1934; 1938; 1946–1990; 1994; 1998; 2002; 2006; 2010; 2012; 2014; 2016; 2018; 2022; 2024

Other related appearances
- Soviet Union (1946–1990)

Estonia competed at the 2016 European Athletics Championships in Amsterdam, Netherlands, between 6 and 10 July 2016.

== Medalists ==
Medal	Name	Event	Date	Result
Bronze	Gerd Kanter	Men's discus throw	9 July	65.27 SB

== Results ==
Men

Track & road events

Athlete	Event	Heat		Semifinal		Final	
Athlete	Event	Result	Rank	Result	Rank	Result	Rank
Marek Niit	100 m	10.48	17	Did not advance			
Marek Niit	200 m	21.93	23	Did not advance			
Jaak-Heinrich Jagor	400 m hurdles	50.54	5 Q	49.65 SB	13	Did not advance	
Rasmus Mägi	400 m hurdles	BYE		49.50	=10	Did not advance	
Kaur Kivistik	3000 m steeplechase	8:33.94 SB	12 Q	—		8:33.75 SB	7
Jaak-Heinrich Jagor; Rauno Künnapuu; Marek Niit; Rivar Tipp	4 x 400 m relay	3:10.63 SB	15	—		Did not advance	
Roman Fosti	Half marathon	—				1:06.00	31

Field Events

Athlete	Event	Qualification		Final	
Athlete	Event	Distance	Rank	Distance	Rank
Kristo Galeta	Shot put	18.76	21	Did not advance	
Gerd Kanter	Discus throw	65.13 SB	4 Q	65.27 SB	3rd place, bronze medalist(s)
Martin Kupper	Discus throw	64.23	9 Q	63.55	7
Magnus Kirt	Javelin throw	74.64	26	Did not advance	
Tanel Laanmäe	Javelin throw	80.46	15	Did not advance	
Risto Mätas	Javelin throw	81.19	8 q	82.03 SB	4

Combined events – Decathlon

Athlete	Event	100 m	LJ	SP	HJ	400 m	110H	DT	PV	JT	1500 m	Final	Rank
Janek Õiglane	Result	11.21 PB	7.10	14.68 SB	1.98	51.48	16.47	44.62 PB	4.80 =PB	67.41 SB	4:42.01	7762 SB	12
Janek Õiglane	Points	814	838	770	785	748	681	759	849	850	668	7762 SB	12
Mikk Pahapill	Result	DNS	DNS	DNS	DNS	DNS	DNS	DNS	DNS	DNS	DNS	DNS	-
Mikk Pahapill	Points	DNS	DNS	DNS	DNS	DNS	DNS	DNS	DNS	DNS	DNS	DNS	-
Kristjan Rosenberg	Result	11.11 SB	7.08	13.74 PB	2.10	50.61	15.54	35.32	4.70	61.65 PB	4:31.12 PB	7738	13
Kristjan Rosenberg	Points	836	833	712	896	787	785	570	819	763	737	7738	13

Women

Track & road events

Athlete	Event	Heat		Semifinal		Final	
Athlete	Event	Result	Rank	Result	Rank	Result	Rank
Liina Tšernov	1500 m	4:29.47	20	—		Did not advance	

Field Events

Athlete	Event	Qualification		Final	
Athlete	Event	Distance	Rank	Distance	Rank
Eleriin Haas	High jump	1.85	18	Did not advance	
Anna Iljuštšenko	High jump	1.80	23	Did not advance	
Ksenija Balta	Long jump	6.64 SB	3 Q	6.65 SB	4
Kätlin Piirimäe	Shot put	15.85	22	Did not advance	
Liina Laasma	Javelin throw	56.61	18	Did not advance	

Combined events – Heptathlon

Athlete	Event	100H	HJ	SP	200 m	LJ	JT	800 m	Final	Rank
Mari Klaup	Result	14.02	1.77	11.79	26.18	4.16	50.46	DNS	DNF	
Mari Klaup	Points	976	903	647	781	345	869	DNS	DNF	
Grit Šadeiko	Result	13.58 SB	1.68	12.77 PB	24.57	NM	DNS	DNS	DNF	
Grit Šadeiko	Points	1039	795	712	927	0	DNS	DNS	DNF	

Key

- Q = Qualified for the next round
- q = Qualified for the next round as a fastest loser or, in field events, by position without achieving the qualifying target
