= Denis Kudryavtsev =

Russian hurdler

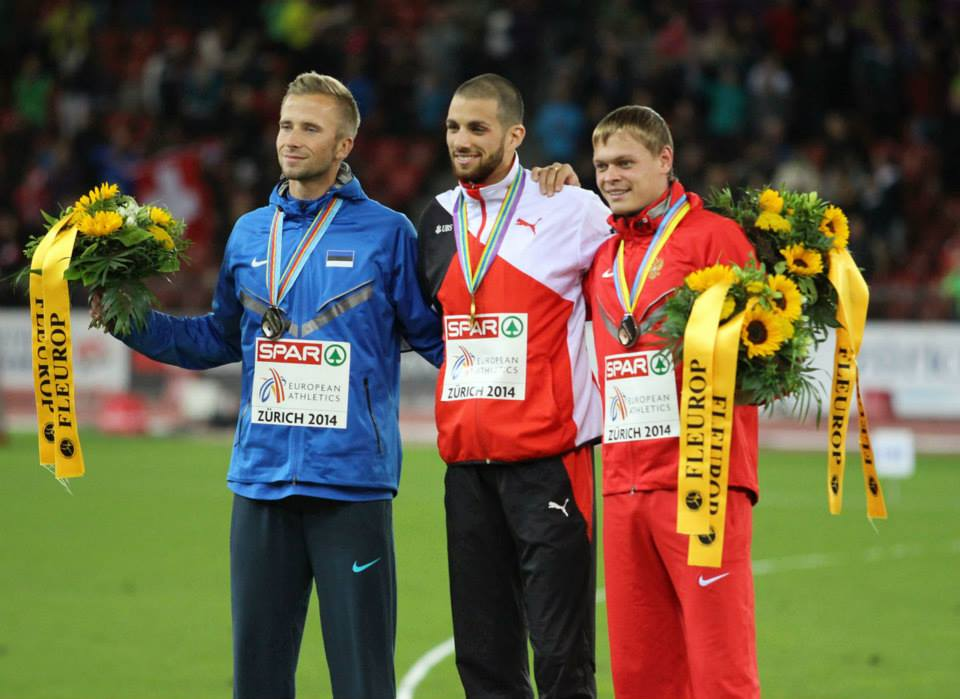
- Denis Kudryavtsev in 2014

Personal information
- Nationality: Russian
- Born: 13 April 1992 (age 34) Chelyabinsk, Russia

Sport
- Sport: Track and field
- Event: 400 metres hurdles

Achievements and titles
- Personal best: 48.05 (2015)
Medal record
Men's athletics
Representing Russia
World Championships
Silver medal – second place	2015 Beijing	400 m hurdles
European Championships
Bronze medal – third place	2014 Zürich	400 m hurdles

Denis Aleksandrovich Kudryavtsev (Russian: Денис Александрович Кудрявцев; born 13 April 1992) is a Russian athlete specialising in the 400 metres hurdles.

== Career ==
He won a silver medal at the 2015 World Championships and a bronze medal at the 2014 European Championships. Earlier, he represented his country at the 2013 World Championships without qualifying for the semifinals.

His personal best in the event is 48.05 seconds set at the 2015 World Championships final in Beijing. That time is also a Russian record.

== Competition record ==
Year	Competition	Venue	Position	Event	Notes
Representing Russia
2011	European Junior Championships	Tallinn, Estonia	10th (sf)	400 m hurdles	52.15
2013	European U23 Championships	Tampere, Finland	10th (sf)	400 m hurdles	50.84
2013	World Championships	Moscow, Russia	23rd (h)	400 m hurdles	50.02
2014	World Indoor Championships	Sopot, Poland	5th	4 × 400 m relay	3:07.12
2014	European Championships	Zürich, Switzerland	3rd	400 m hurdles	49.16
2015	World Championships	Beijing, China	2nd	400 m hurdles	48.05
2015	World Championships	Beijing, China	7th (h)	4 × 400 m relay	2:59.45
