= Timofey Chalyy =

Russian hurdler (born 1994)

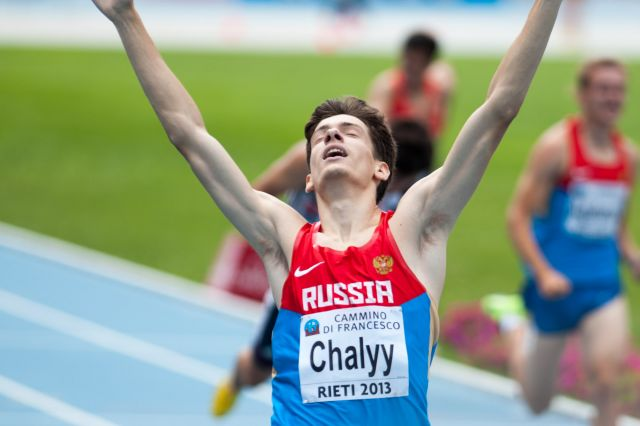
- Timofey Chalyy in 2013.

Personal information
- Nationality: Russian
- Born: 7 April 1994 (age 32)
- Height: 194 cm (6 ft 4 in)
- Weight: 77 kg (170 lb)

Sport
- Sport: Track and field
- Event: 400 metres hurdles

Achievements and titles
- Personal bests: 48.57 (400 metres hurdles); 46.71 (400 indoor); 1.17.01 (600 indoor)
Medal record
Men's athletics
Representing Russia
European Junior Championships
Gold medal – first place	2013 Rieti	400 m hurdles

Timofey Yuryevich Chalyy (Cyrillic: Тимофей Юрьевич Чалый; born 7 April 1994) is a Russian athlete specialising in the 400 metres hurdles. He represented his country at the 2013 World Championships reaching the semifinals. In addition, he finished fourth at the 2014 European Championships.

His personal best in the event is 48.57 seconds set in Moscow in 2016. With 49.23, set in 2013, he holds the Russian junior record.

== Competition record ==
Year	Competition	Venue	Position	Event	Notes
Representing Russia
2011	World Youth Championships	Lille, France	19th (h)	400 m	48.45
2012	World Junior Championships	Barcelona, Spain	7th	400 m hurdles	51.17
2012	World Junior Championships	Barcelona, Spain	7th (h)	4 × 400 m relay	3:08.58
2013	European Junior Championships	Rieti, Italy	1st	400 m hurdles	49.23
2013	World Championships	Moscow, Russia	19th (sf)	400 m hurdles	50.06
2014	European Championships	Zürich, Switzerland	4th	400 m hurdles	49.56
2015	European U23 Championships	Tallinn, Estonia	9th (h)	400m hurdles	51.12
2015	World Championships	Beijing, China	10th (sf)	400 m hurdles	48.69
Competing as Authorised Neutral Athlete
2018	European Championships	Berlin, Germany	8th	400 m hurdles	49.41
