= 2013 World Championships in Athletics – Men's 400 metres hurdles =

Men's 400 metres hurdles at the 2013 World Championships
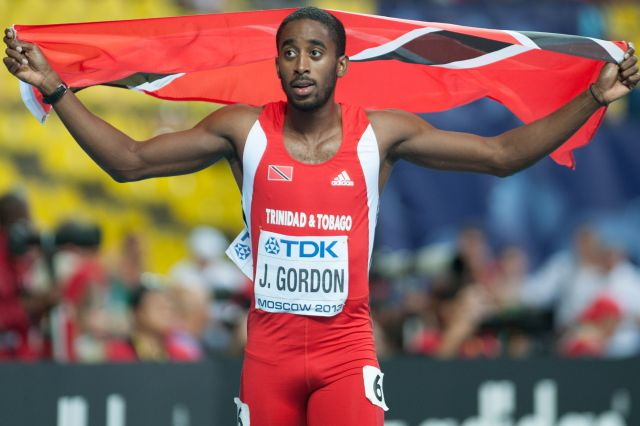
- Gold medalist Jehue Gordon
- Venue: Luzhniki Stadium
- Dates: 12 August (heats); 13 August (semifinals); 15 August (final)
- Competitors: 36 from 23 nations
- Winning time: 47.69

Medalists
gold medal	Jehue Gordon; Trinidad and Tobago
silver medal	Michael Tinsley; United States
bronze medal	Emir Bekrić; Serbia

Official Video

The men's 400 metres hurdles at the 2013 World Championships in Athletics was held at the Luzhniki Stadium on 12–15 August.

In the second semifinal, it took Emir Bekrić a new Serbian national record to get the second automatic qualifier behind Michael Tinsley. The third semifinal was fast, with the now 35-year-old double Olympic and World Champion Félix Sánchez chasing Omar Cisneros' new world leading time. "The Dictator's" 48.10 season best took the Masters M35 world record from Danny McFarlane.

In the final Kerron Clement was out like a rocket, first over the first barrier, but long strides in lane one don't usually work out. Down the backstretch Tinsley asserted himself and by the fifth hurdle was clearly the leader with Cisneros the next in line. At the back were Bekrić and Sanchez. Through the turn Javier Culson then Jehue Gordon tried to make up ground on Tinsley. Gordon broke away and passed Tinsley over the last hurdle with the momentum. Going into the line it looked like Gordon had the step but Tinsley worked his way back into first. In one of the best dives of modern time, Gordon snatched the win, then one step later falling to the track. Bekrić might have been the fastest finisher, coming from fifth place to third on the final straight setting a second national record at 48.05

== Records ==
Prior to the competition, the records were as follows:

World record	Kevin Young (USA)	46.78	Barcelona, Spain	6 August 1992
Championship record	Kevin Young (USA)	47.18	Stuttgart, Germany	19 August 1993
World Leading	Michael Tinsley (USA)	47.96	Des Moines, IA, United States	22 June 2013
African Record	Samuel Matete (ZAM)	47.10	Zürich, Switzerland	7 August 1991
Asian Record	Hadi Soua'an Al-Somaily (KSA)	47.53	Sydney, Australia	27 September 2000
North, Central American and Caribbean record	Kevin Young (USA)	46.78	Barcelona, Spain	6 August 1992
South American Record	Bayano Kamani (PAN)	47.84	Helsinki, Finland	7 August 2005
European Record	Stéphane Diagana (FRA)	47.37	Lausanne, Switzerland	5 July 1995
Oceanian record	Rohan Robinson (AUS)	48.28	Atlanta, GA, United States	31 July 1996

== Qualification standards ==
A time	B time
49.40	49.60

== Schedule ==
Date	Time	Round
12 August 2013	11:05	Heats
13 August 2013	19:40	Semifinals
15 August 2013	21:00	Final

All times are local times (UTC+4)

== Results ==
KEY:	q	Fastest non-qualifiers	Q	Qualified	NR	National record	PB	Personal best	SB	Seasonal best

=== Heats ===
Qualification: First 4 in each heat (Q) and the next 4 fastest (q) advanced to the semifinals.

Rank	Heat	Lane	Name	Nationality	Time	Notes
1	1	3	Michael Tinsley	United States	49.07	Q
2	1	8	Emir Bekrić	Serbia	49.16	Q
3	3	7	Félix Sánchez	Dominican Republic	49.20	Q
4	1	7	Timofey Chalyy	Russia	49.33	Q
5	4	6	Mamadou Kassé Hanne	Senegal	49.33	Q
6	3	2	Kerron Clement	United States	49.43	Q
7	4	3	Leford Green	Jamaica	49.45	Q
8	5	5	Jehue Gordon	Trinidad and Tobago	49.52	Q
9	5	7	Isa Phillips	Jamaica	49.57	Q
10	3	6	Annsert Whyte	Jamaica	49.63	Q
10	5	8	Rasmus Mägi	Estonia	49.63	Q
12	1	4	Cornel Fredericks	South Africa	49.66	Q
12	1	6	Sebastian Rodger	Great Britain & N.I.	49.66	q
14	4	8	Bershawn Jackson	United States	49.76	Q
15	5	6	Eric Alejandro	Puerto Rico	49.79	Q
16	5	4	Dai Greene	Great Britain & N.I.	49.79	q
17	1	5	Tristan Thomas	Australia	49.80	q
18	3	3	Rhys Williams	Great Britain & N.I.	49.85	Q
19	2	6	Omar Cisneros	Cuba	49.87	Q
20	2	4	Javier Culson	Puerto Rico	49.91	Q
21	2	2	Takayuki Kishimoto	Japan	49.96	Q
22	5	3	Mahau Suguimati	Brazil	50.00	q
23	2	5	Mickaël François	France	50.02	Q
23	3	5	Denis Kudryavtsev	Russia	50.02	
25	2	8	L.J. van Zyl	South Africa	50.05	
26	1	2	Yoann Décimus	France	50.21	
27	4	1	Jeffery Gibson	Bahamas	50.25	Q
28	3	4	Andrés Silva	Uruguay	50.48	SB
29	4	5	Yasuhiro Fueki	Japan	50.66	
30	2	7	Miloud Rahmani	Algeria	50.79	
31	3	8	PC Beneke	South Africa	51.14	
32	5	2	Takatoshi Abe	Japan	51.41	
33	4	4	Mowen Boino	Papua New Guinea	51.49	SB
34	4	7	Eric Cray	Philippines	52.45	
35	2	3	Maoulida Daroueche	Comoros	53.28	
	2	1	Jacques Frisch	Luxembourg	DNF	
	4	2	Silvio Schirrmeister	Germany	DNS	

=== Semifinals ===
Qualification: First 2 in each heat (Q) and the next 2 fastest (q) advanced to the final.

Rank	Heat	Lane	Name	Nationality	Time	Notes
1	3	5	Omar Cisneros	Cuba	47.93	Q, WL
2	3	4	Félix Sánchez	Dominican Republic	48.10	Q, SB
2	1	6	Jehue Gordon	Trinidad and Tobago	48.10	Q
4	3	6	Kerron Clement	United States	48.21	q
5	2	4	Michael Tinsley	United States	48.31	Q
6	2	5	Emir Bekrić	Serbia	48.36	Q, NR, EL
7	1	4	Javier Culson	Puerto Rico	48.42	Q
8	1	5	Mamadou Kassé Hanne	Senegal	48.69	q
9	1	7	Cornel Fredericks	South Africa	48.85	
10	2	3	Leford Green	Jamaica	48.88	SB
11	3	3	Annsert Whyte	Jamaica	49.17	PB
12	3	2	Dai Greene	Great Britain & N.I.	49.25	
13	1	3	Isa Phillips	Jamaica	49.28	SB
14	2	8	Rhys Williams	Great Britain & N.I.	49.29	
15	1	2	Sebastian Rodger	Great Britain & N.I.	49.32	
16	3	8	Rasmus Mägi	Estonia	49.42	
17	3	7	Eric Alejandro	Puerto Rico	49.44	SB
18	1	1	Tristan Thomas	Australia	49.91	
19	2	6	Timofey Chalyy	Russia	50.06	
20	2	1	Mahau Suguimati	Brazil	50.27	
21	3	1	Jeffery Gibson	Bahamas	50.51	
22	2	2	Mickaël François	France	50.58	
	2	7	Takayuki Kishimoto	Japan	DQ	R 168.7(a)
	1	8	Bershawn Jackson	United States	DNF	

=== Final ===
The final was started at 21:00.

Rank	Lane	Name	Nationality	Time	Notes
1st place, gold medalist(s)	6	Jehue Gordon	Trinidad and Tobago	47.69	NR, WL
2nd place, silver medalist(s)	3	Michael Tinsley	United States	47.70	PB
3rd place, bronze medalist(s)	8	Emir Bekrić	Serbia	48.05	NR, ЕL
4	5	Omar Cisneros	Cuba	48.12	
5	4	Félix Sánchez	Dominican Republic	48.22	
6	7	Javier Culson	Puerto Rico	48.38	
7	2	Mamadou Kassé Hanne	Senegal	48.68	
8	1	Kerron Clement	United States	49.08	
