= Denys Nechyporenko =

Ukrainian hurdler

Personal information
- Born: 7 January 1990 (age 35)
- Height: 1.86 m (6 ft 1 in)
- Weight: 73 kg (161 lb)

Sport
- Sport: Athletics
- Event: 400 metres hurdles

Denys Nechyporenko (Ukrainian: Дени́с Нечипоре́нко; born 7 January 1990) is a Ukrainian athlete specialising in the 400 metres hurdles. He represented his country at three consecutive European Championships twice reaching the semifinals

His personal best in the event is 50.08 seconds set in Kirovograd in 2014.

== International competitions ==
Year	Competition	Venue	Position	Event	Notes
Representing Ukraine
2009	European Junior Championships	Novi Sad, Serbia	26th (h)	400 m hurdles	55.22
2014	European Championships	Zürich, Switzerland	16th (sf)	400 m hurdles	50.35
2016	European Championships	Amsterdam, Netherlands	18th (h)	400 m hurdles	51.53
2018	European Championships	Berlin, Germany	17th (sf)	400 m hurdles	50.27
