= Eric Futch =

American hurdler

Eric Futch (born April 25, 1993) is a track and field athlete who represents the United States and competes in the 400-meter hurdles.

Competing for the Florida Gators track and field team, Futch won the 400 meter hurdles at the 2016 NCAA Division I Outdoor Track and Field Championships. He had earlier competed for the Houston Cougars track and field team.

At the 2012 World Junior Championships in Athletics, Futch won the 400 metres hurdles.

Futch won the 400 meter hurdles at the 2017 USA Outdoor Track and Field Championships to qualify for the 2017 World Championships in Athletics.
