= Thomas Barr (athlete) =

Irish track and field athlete

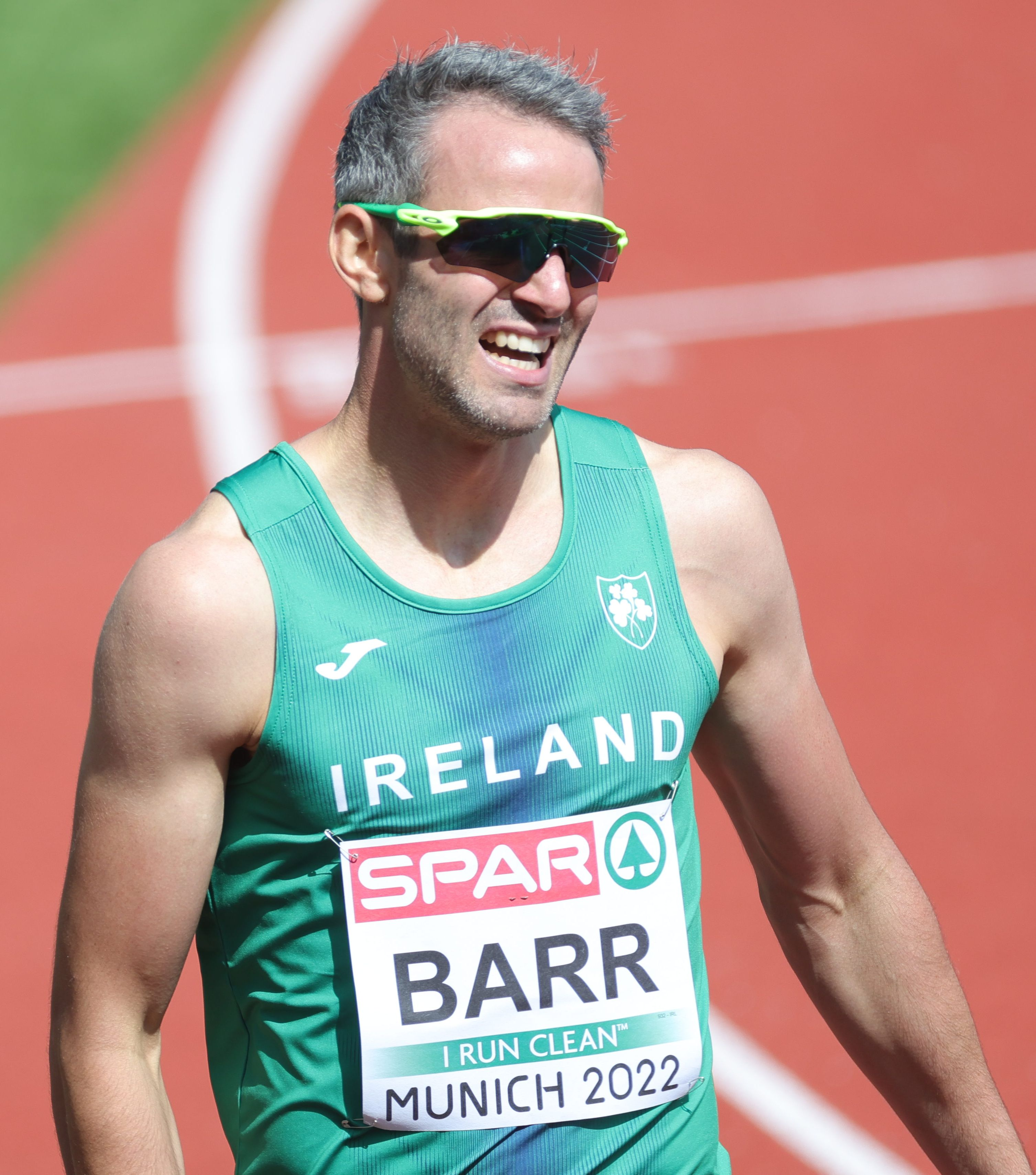
- Thomas Barr at 2022 European Championships

Personal information
- Nationality: Irish
- Born: 24 July 1992 (age 33) Waterford, Ireland
- Education: Sports Performance MScUniversity of Limerick
- Years active: 2011–2024
- Agent: David Scott (Stellar Athletics)
- Height: 183 cm (6 ft 0 in)
- Weight: 69 kg (152 lb)

Sport
- Country: Ireland
- Sport: Track and field
- Event: 400 metres hurdles
- University team: University of Limerick
- Club: Ferrybank AC
- Coached by: Hayley & Drew Harrison

Achievements and titles
- Personal bests: 400 m hurdles: 47.97 s 400 m (indoor): 46.97 s
Medal record
Representing Ireland
Men's athletics
World Athletics Relays
Bronze medal – third place	2024 Nassau	4 × 400 m mixed
Summer Universiade
Gold medal – first place	2015 Gwangju	400 m hurdles
European Championships
Gold medal – first place	2024 Rome	4 × 400 m mixed
Bronze medal – third place	2018 Berlin	400 m hurdles

Thomas Barr (born 24 July 1992) is a retired Irish track and field athlete who competed in the sprints and hurdles. He is probably best known for being a member of the winning European Championship Mixed 4 × 400 m Relay team and finishing 4th in the 400 m Hurdles at the 2016 Olympics. Barr announced his retirement in January 2025.

== International career ==
In 2014, Barr was a semi-finalist at the 2014 European Athletics Championships in the 400 meter hurdles. In 2015, he finished 3rd at the Qatar Athletic Super Grand Prix as part of the 2015 IAAF Diamond League.

Barr won gold in the 400 metres hurdles at the 2015 World University Games (Summer Universiade) in Gwangju, South Korea with a time of 48.78 seconds.

On 15 August at the 2016 Summer Olympics, Barr finished second in his heat of the 400 m hurdles in a season best time of 48.93. The following day he broke the Irish record and won his semi-final to qualify for the final in a time of 48.39. He finished fourth in the final, again breaking the Irish record with a time of 47.97.

In August 2017, Barr was forced to withdraw from the 400 m hurdles semi-final heats at the 2017 World Championships in Athletics after a bout of gastroenteritis.

On 9 August 2018, Barr won bronze in the 400 m hurdles at the 2018 European Athletics Championships with a season best time of 48.31, his second fastest time ever.

In June 2024, Barr won gold at the European Championships, running the third leg of the 4 × 400 m mixed relay, passing the baton on to Sharlene Mawdsley in second place with a 44.90 split. Mawdsley ran down the leading Belgian Helena Ponette in the home strait, crossing the line in the gold medal position in an Irish record time of 3:09.92. Barr had been passed the baton by Rhasidat Adeleke in 1st place. Christopher O'Donnell ran the opening leg for Ireland.

== Achievements ==
=== International championships ===
Year	Competition	Venue	Position	Event	Notes
Representing Ireland
2011	European Junior Championships	Tallinn, Estonia	8th	400 m hurdles	51.02
2012	European Championships	Helsinki, Finland	5th (sf)	400 m hurdles	50.22
2013	European U23 Championships	Tampere, Finland	8th	400 m hurdles	50.14
2014	European Championships	Zürich, Switzerland	3rd (sf)	400 m hurdles	49.30
2014	European Championships	Zürich, Switzerland	4th	4 × 400 m relay	3:01.67
2015	World Relays	Nassau, Bahamas	6th (h)	4 × 400 m relay	3:07.11
2015	Summer Universiade	Gwangju, South Korea	1st	400 m hurdles	48.78
2015	World Championships	Beijing, China	11th (sf)	400 m hurdles	48.71
2015	World Championships	Beijing, China	13th (h)	4 × 400 m relay	3:01.26
2016	European Championships	Amsterdam, Netherlands	5th (sf)	400 m hurdles	50.09
2016	European Championships	Amsterdam, Netherlands	5th	4 × 400 m relay	3:04.32
2016	Olympic Games	Rio de Janeiro, Brazil	4th	400 m hurdles	47.97 NR
2017	World Championships	London, United Kingdom	18th (h)^{1}	400 m hurdles	49.79
2018	European Championships	Berlin, Germany	3rd	400 m hurdles	48.31
2018	European Championships	Berlin, Germany	5th (h)	4 × 400 m relay	3:06.55
2019	European Indoor Championships	Glasgow, United Kingdom	4th (h)	400 m sh	48.22
2019	World Championships	Doha, Qatar	11th (sf)	400 m hurdles	49.02
2021	World Relays	Chorzów, Poland	4th (h)^{2}	4 × 400 m relay mixed	3:16.84 NR
2021	Olympic Games	Tokyo, Japan	9th (sf)	400 m hurdles	48.26
2022	World Championships	Eugene, United States	19th (sf)	400 m hurdles	50.08
2022	European Championships	Munich, Germany	4th (h)	400 m hurdles	49.30
2024	World Relays	Nassau, Bahamas	3rd	4 × 400 m relay mixed	3:11.53 NR
2024	European Championships	Rome, Italy	1st	4 × 400 m relay mixed	3:09.92 CR, NR
2024	European Championships	Rome, Italy	16th (sf)	400 m hurdles	49.61
2024	Olympic Games	Paris, France	10th (h)	4 × 400 m relay mixed	3:12.67

^{1 Result from the heats, Barr did not start in the semi-finals.
2 Result from the heats, Barr did not start in the final.}

== Awards ==
In April 2015, Barr was named the European Athlete of the Month for, in part, being part of a national relay record and having a world-best time in the 400 metre hurdles.

Barr was named as the 2016 Athlete of the Year at the National Athletics Awards on 30 November 2016.

== Records ==
Barr holds the Irish national record in the 400 metre hurdles. In 2014 he was also part of the relay team that set the Irish national record in the 4 × 400 metres relay.

== Personal life ==
Barr is the younger brother of Irish Olympic track athlete Jessie Barr. He is from Dunmore East in Waterford where he attended Killea boys primary school and De la Salle school, Waterford.
