= Estonia at the 2010 European Athletics Championships =

- WA code: EST
- National federation: Eesti Kergejõustikuliit
- Website: www.ekjl.ee

in Barcelona
- Competitors: 17
- Medals: Gold 0 Silver 0 Bronze 0 Total 0

European Athletics Championships appearances (overview)
- 1934; 1938; 1946–1990; 1994; 1998; 2002; 2006; 2010; 2012; 2014; 2016; 2018; 2022; 2024

Other related appearances
- Soviet Union (1946–1990)

Estonia was represented by 17 athletes (12 men and 5 women) at the 2010 European Athletics Championships held in Barcelona, Spain, from 27 July to 1 August 2010.

== Participants ==
Event	Men	Women
200 m		Ksenija Balta
400 m		Maris Mägi
5000 m	Tiidrek Nurme	
400 m hurdles	Aarne Nirk	
High Jump		Anna Iljuštšenko
Long Jump	Tõnis Sahk	Ksenija Balta
Triple Jump	Jaanus Uudmäe; Igor Sjunin	Veera Baranova
Shot Put	Taavi Peetre	
Discus Throw	Gerd Kanter; Märt Israel; Aleksander Tammert	
Decathlon/Heptathlon	Mikk Pahapill; Andres Raja; Mikk Mihkel Arro	Grit Šadeiko

== Results ==
2010 Barcelona	Gold	Silver	Bronze	Total
Estonia (EST)	0	0	0	0
