= Michal Brož =

Czech hurdler

Personal information
- Born: 16 June 1992 (age 34)
- Height: 1.86 m (6 ft 1 in)
- Weight: 73 kg (161 lb)

Sport
- Sport: Athletics
- Event: 400 metres hurdles
- Club: TJ Dukla Praha

Michal Brož (born 16 June 1992) is a Czech athlete specialising in the 400 metres hurdles. He represented his country at four consecutive European Championships reaching the semifinals on each occasion.

His personal best in the event is 49.78 seconds set in Tampere in 2013.

== International competitions ==
Year	Competition	Venue	Position	Event	Notes
Representing the Czech Republic
2009	World Youth Championships	Brixen, Italy	24th (sf)	110 m hurdles (91.4 cm)	14.93
2011	European Junior Championships	Tallinn, Estonia	12th (sf)	400 m hurdles	52.50
2011	European Junior Championships	Tallinn, Estonia	5th	4 × 400 m relay	3:10.20
2012	European Championships	Helsinki, Finland	21st (sf)	400 m hurdles	51.35
2013	European U23 Championships	Tampere, Finland	5th	400 m hurdles	49.78
2014	European Championships	Zurich, Switzerland	17th (sf)	400 m hurdles	50.39
2015	Universiade	Gwangju, South Korea	13th (sf)	400 m hurdles	51.27
2016	European Championships	Amsterdam, Netherlands	22nd (sf)	400 m hurdles	50.85
2018	European Championships	Berlin, Germany	19th (sf)	400 m hurdles	50.31
