= Niall Flannery =

English hurdler

Personal information
- Nationality: British (English)
- Born: 26 April 1991 (age 34) Newcastle upon Tyne, England

Sport
- Sport: Track and field
- Event: 400 metres hurdles
- Club: Gateshead Harriers

Niall Flannery (born 26 April 1991) is an English hurdler.

== Biography ==
Flannery set his personal best in the 400 metres hurdles with a time of 48.80 seconds in Ostrava during 2014. He represented England at the 2014 Commonwealth Games in Glasgow.

He then competed in the 400 metres hurdles event at the 2015 World Championships in Beijing reaching the semifinals.

Flannery was twice British 400 metres hurdles champion after winning the British Athletics Championships in 2014 and 2015.

== Competition record ==
Year	Competition	Venue	Position	Event	Notes
Representing Great Britain and England
2007	European Youth Olympic Festival	Belgrade, Serbia	4th	400 m hurdles (84 cm)	53.28
2009	European Junior Championships	Novi Sad, Serbia	4th	400 m hurdles	51.50
2011	European U23 Championships	Ostrava, Czech Republic	8th	400 m hurdles	50.32
2011	Universiade	Shenzhen, China	24th (sf)	400 m hurdles	53.86
2011	Universiade	Shenzhen, China	5th	4 × 400 m relay	3:08.68
2013	European U23 Championships	Tampere, Finland	4th	400 m hurdles	49.76
2014	Commonwealth Games	Glasgow, United Kingdom	4th	400 m hurdles	49.46
2014	European Championships	Zürich, Switzerland	14th (sf)	400 m hurdles	50.15
2015	World Championships	Beijing, China	17th (sf)	400 m hurdles	49.17
