= Emir Bekrić =

Serbian hurdler

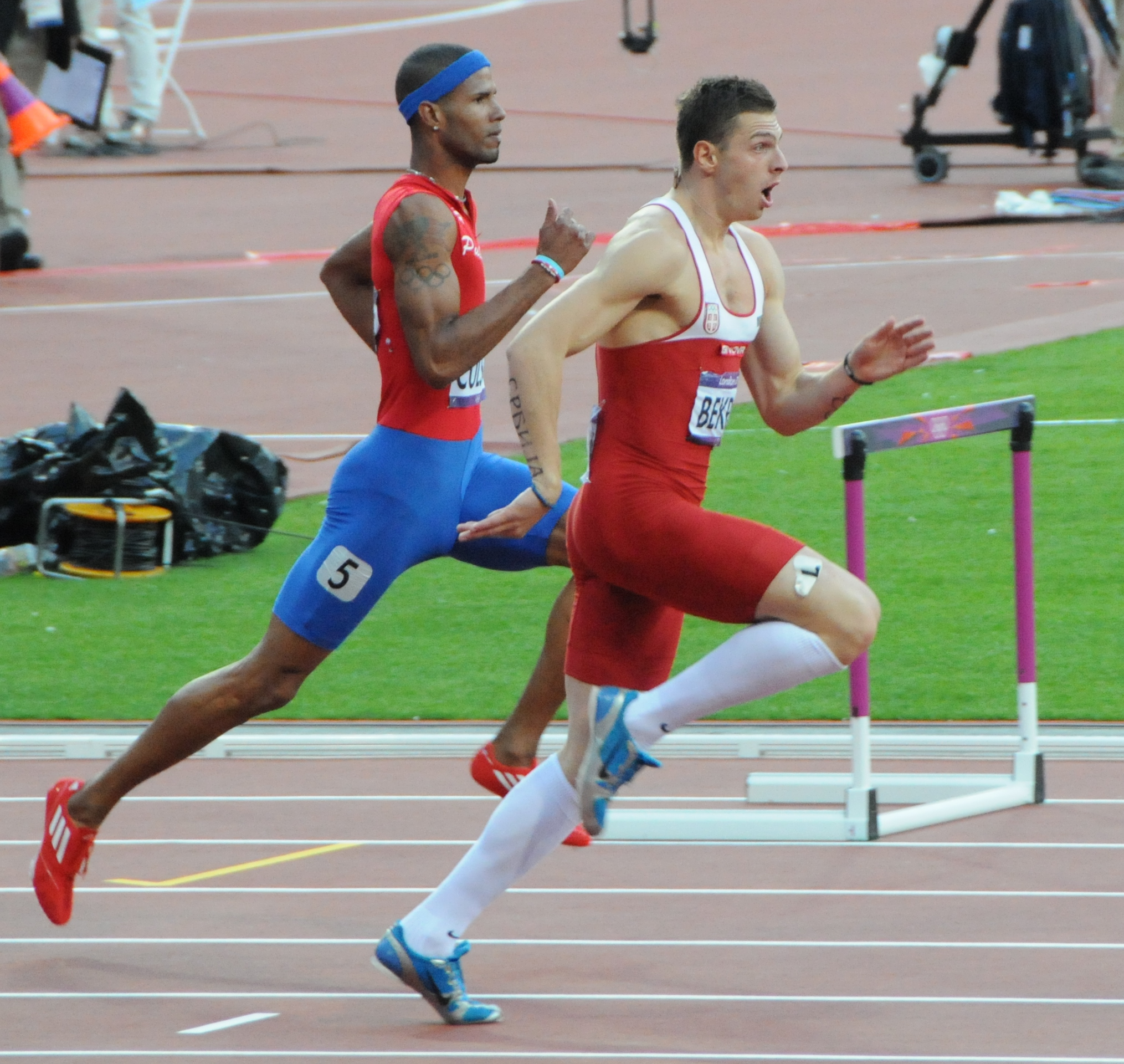
- Bekrić at the 2012 Summer Olympics

Personal information
- Nationality: Serbian
- Born: 14 March 1991 (age 35) Belgrade, SR Serbia, SFR Yugoslavia
- Height: 1.95 m (6 ft 5 in)
- Weight: 88 kg (194 lb)

Sport
- Sport: Track
- Event: 400 metres hurdles
- Club: AK Partizan

Achievements and titles
- Personal bests: 400 metres: 46.49; 400-m hurdles: 48.05 (NR)
Medal record
Representing Serbia
World Championships
Bronze medal – third place	2013 Moscow	400 m hurdles
European Championships
Silver medal – second place	2012 Helsinki	400 m hurdles
Mediterranean Games
Gold medal – first place	2013 Mersin	400 m hurdles
European U23 Championships
Gold medal – first place	2013 Tampere	400 m hurdles
Bronze medal – third place	2011 Ostrava	400 m hurdles

Emir Bekrić (Serbian Cyrillic: Емир Бекрић, born 14 March 1991) is a former Serbian hurdler. He specialises and holds the Serbian national record for the 400 metres hurdles. He is coached by Mirjana Stojanović. In 2013, Bekrić became the first male track and field athlete from Serbia to win a medal at the IAAF Outdoor World Championships. In the same year he won the award European athletics rising star, as well as golden badge for Serbian athlete of the year.

== Early life ==
Born to a Bosnian Muslim father and a Serb mother, Emir has a sister named Sena. He is an Orthodox Christian, and has said that religion and Orthodoxy are very important for him and have helped him in his career.

== Hurdling career ==
Bekrić won a bronze medal at the 2011 European Athletics U23 Championships in Ostrava. At the 2011 Summer Universiade in Shenzhen he broke the national record in semifinal for the 400 meter hurdles, breaking 50 seconds and beating Jeshua Anderson who later won the gold medal in the finals. At the 2012 European Championships he again broke national record in semifinals. In the final he won a silver medal. At the 2012 Summer Olympics in London, Bekrić broke the Serbian national record for the 400m hurdles for the third time with a time of 49.21 seconds. At the 2013 World Championships in Athletics in Moscow he won the bronze medal and posted the new national record with a time of 48.05 seconds.

== Personal bests ==
Type	Event	Best	Location	Date	Notes
Outdoor	400 metres	46.49s	Belgrade, Serbia	4 August 2013	
Outdoor	400 metres hurdles	48.05s	Moscow, Russia	15 August 2013	NR
Indoor	400 metres	47.17s	Prague, Czech Republic	25 February 2014	

== Achievements ==
Year	Competition	Venue	Position	Event	Notes
Representing Serbia
2009	European Team Championships — 1st League	Bergen, Norway	12th	400 m hurdles	54.33
2009	European Junior Championships	Novi Sad, Serbia	sf	400 m hurdles	53.45
2009	Universiade	Belgrade, Serbia	18th (h)	400 m hurdles	53.16
2010	European Team Championships — 2nd League	Belgrade, Serbia	2nd	400 m hurdles	51.66
2010	World Junior Championships	Moncton, Canada	7th	400 m hurdles	51.06
2011	European Team Championships — 2nd League	Novi Sad, Serbia	2nd	400 m hurdles	50.35
2011	European Indoor Championships	Paris, France	21st (h)	400 m	48.34
2011	European U23 Championships	Ostrava, Czech Republic	3rd	400 m hurdles	49.61 (NR)
2011	Universiade	Shenzhen, China	6th	400 m hurdles	50.20
2011	World Championships	Daegu, South Korea	19th (sf)	400 m hurdles	49.94
2012	European Championships	Helsinki, Finland	2nd	400 m hurdles	49.49
2012	Summer Olympics	London, United Kingdom	14th (sf)	400 m hurdles	49.62
2013	European Team Championships — 2nd League	Kaunas, Lithuania	1st	400 m hurdles	49.98
2013	European Team Championships — 2nd League	Kaunas, Lithuania	1st	4 × 400 m	3:08.73
2013	Mediterranean Games	Mersin, Turkey	1st	400 m hurdles	48.83 (NR, GR)
2013	European U23 Championships	Tampere, Finland	1st	400 m hurdles	48.76 (NR)
2013	World Championships	Moscow, Russia	3rd	400 m hurdles	48.05 (NR)
2014	European Team Championships — 2nd League	Riga, Latvia	1st	400 m hurdles	49.64
2014	European Team Championships — 2nd League	Riga, Latvia	3rd	4 × 400 m	3:08.54
2014	European Championships	Zürich, Switzerland	6th	400 m hurdles	49.90
2018	European Championships	Berlin, Germany	23rd (sf)	400 m hurdles	50.96

Awards and achievements
Preceded by (Czech Republic) Pavel Maslák	Men's European Athletics Rising Star of the Year; 2013	Succeeded by (United Kingdom) Adam Gemili
Preceded by Milica Mandić	The Best Athlete of Serbia; 2013	Succeeded by Davor Štefanek
