= Sergio Fernández (hurdler) =

Spanish hurdler (born 1993)

Personal information
- Full name: Sergio Fernández Roda
- Nationality: Spanish
- Born: 1 April 1993 (age 33) Barañáin, Spain
- Height: 1.90 m (6 ft 3 in)
- Weight: 72 kg (159 lb)

Sport
- Country: Spain
- Sport: Track and field
- Club: Grupompleo Pamplona Atlético
- Coached by: Jesús Álvarez
Medal record
European Championships
| Silver medal – second place | 2016 Amsterdam | 400 m hurdles |

Sergio Fernández Roda (born 1 April 1993) is a Spanish track and field athlete. He competed at the 2016 European Championships in Amsterdam, Netherlands, where he won the silver medal in the 400 metres hurdles event. Later that year he represented his country at the 2016 Olympic Games where he narrowly missed the final with a new national record in the semifinals.

Fernández represented his country in qualifying rounds at the 2012 World Junior Championships in Athletics, 2014 European Athletics Championships and the 2015 European Athletics U23 Championships.

== Competition record ==
| Year | Competition | Venue | Position | Event | Notes |
Representing Spain
| 2012 | World Junior Championships | Barcelona, Spain | 45th (h) | 400 m hurdles | 53.50 |
| 2014 | Mediterranean U23 Championship | Aubagne, France | 3rd | 400 m hurdles | 51.59 |
| 2014 | European Championships | Zürich, Switzerland | 27th (h) | 400 m hurdles | 50.89 |
| 2015 | European U23 Championships | Tallinn, Estonia | 8th | 400 m hurdles | 1:06.32 |
| 2016 | European Championships | Amsterdam, Netherlands | 2nd | 400 m hurdles | 49.06 |
| 2016 | European Championships | Amsterdam, Netherlands | 10th (h) | 4 × 400 m relay | 3:04.77 |
| 2016 | Olympic Games | Rio de Janeiro, Brazil | 11th (sf) | 400 m hurdles | 48.87 |
| 2017 | World Championships | London, United Kingdom | 30th (h) | 400 m hurdles | 50.38 |
| 2018 | European Championships | Berlin, Germany | 7th | 400 m hurdles | 48.98 |
| 2019 | World Championships | Doha, Qatar | 29th (h) | 400 m hurdles | 50.71 |
| 2021 | Olympic Games | Tokyo, Japan | 35th (h) | 400 m hurdles | 51.51 |
| 2023 | World Championships | Budapest, Hungary | 23rd (h) | 400 m hurdles | 49.26 |
| 2024 | European Championships | Rome, Italy | 12th (sf) | 400 m hurdles | 49.34 |

== Personal bests ==
=== Outdoor ===
| Discipline | Performance | Place | Date |
|---|---|---|---|
| 400 metres hurdles | 48.87 NR | Rio de Janeiro | 16 August 2016 |
