= 2014 European Athletics Championships – Men's 400 metres hurdles =

Men's 400 metres hurdles at the European Athletics Championships

The men's 400 metres hurdles at the 2014 European Athletics Championships took place at the Letzigrund on 12, 13 and 15 August.

== Medalists ==
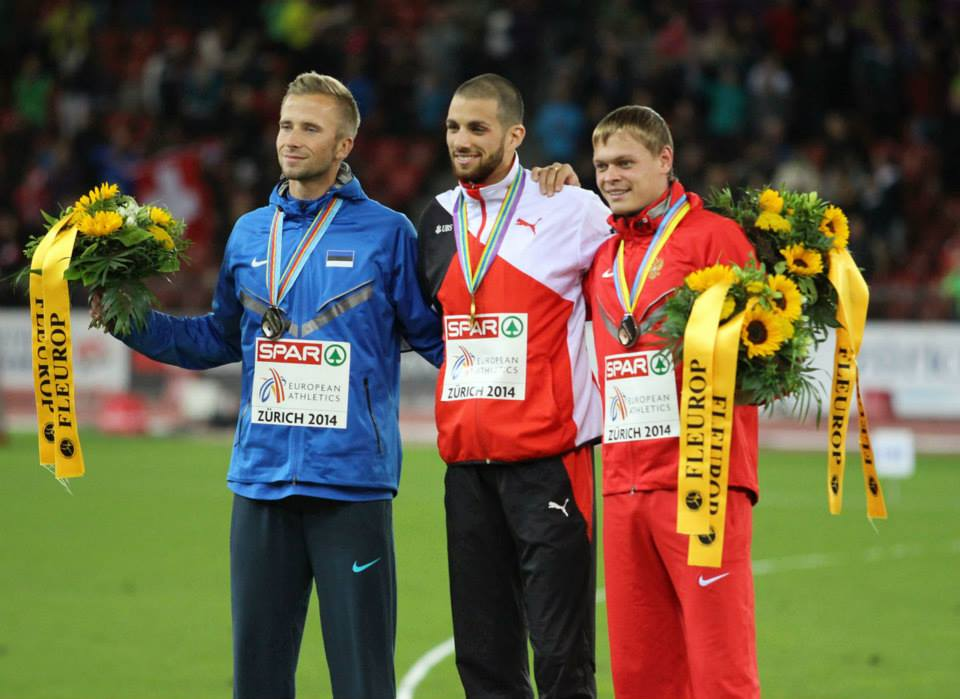
The podium

Gold	Kariem Hussein; Switzerland
Silver	Rasmus Mägi; Estonia
Bronze	Denis Kudryavtsev; Russia

== Records ==
Standing records prior to the 2014 European Athletics Championships
World record	Kevin Young (USA)	46.78	Barcelona, Spain	6 August 1992
European record	Stéphane Diagana (FRA)	47.37	Lausanne, Switzerland	5 July 1995
Championship record	Harald Schmid (FRG)	47.48	Athens, Greece	8 September 1982
World Leading	Javier Culson (PUR)	48.03	New York City, United States	14 June 2014
European Leading	Rasmus Mägi (EST)	48.61	Tallinn, Estonia	3 August 2014
Broken records during the 2014 European Athletics Championships
European Leading	Rasmus Mägi (EST)	48.54	Zürich, Switzerland	13 August 2014

== Schedule ==
Date	Time	Round
12 August 2014	11:00	Round 1
13 August 2014	17:55	Semifinals
15 August 2014	20:52	Final

All times are local times (UTC+2)

== Results ==
=== Round 1 ===
First 4 in each heat (Q) and 4 best performers (q) advance to the Semifinals.

Rank	Heat	Lane	Name	Nationality	Time	Note
1	1	7	Denis Kudryavtsev	Russia	49.05	Q
2	1	6	Varg Königsmark	Germany	49.46	Q
3	1	3	Yoann Décimus	France	49.60	Q, SB
4	5	6	Kariem Hussein	Switzerland	49.70	Q
5	3	2	Rasmus Mägi	Estonia	49.72	Q
6	3	4	Patryk Dobek	Poland	49.73	Q
7	4	5	Niall Flannery	Great Britain	49.77	Q
8	2	2	Thomas Barr	Ireland	49.79	Q
9	4	3	Emir Bekrić	Serbia	49.82	Q
10	3	6	Sebastian Rodger	Great Britain	49.88	Q
11	1	2	Michal Brož	Czech Republic	49.90	Q, SB
12	4	8	Timofey Chalyy	Russia	49.92	Q
13	4	6	Oskari Mörö	Finland	49.97	Q, PB
14	1	8	Stef Vanhaeren	Belgium	49.98	q
15	5	5	Michaël Bultheel	Belgium	50.18	Q
16	2	4	Felix Franz	Germany	50.23	Q
17	2	7	Máté Koroknai	Hungary	50.33	Q, PB
18	1	4	Jussi Kanervo	Finland	50.35	q, PB
19	3	5	Leonardo Capotosti	Italy	50.45	Q
20	5	8	Tom Burton	Great Britain	50.47	Q
21	4	2	Denys Nechyporenko	Ukraine	50.63	q
22	3	7	Stanislav Melnykov	Ukraine	50.72	q, SB
23	2	6	Oleg Mironov	Russia	50.78	Q
24	2	5	Tim Rummens	Belgium	50.80	
25	3	8	Tibor Koroknai	Hungary	50.84	
26	5	7	Janis Baltušs	Latvia	50.89	Q, PB
27	5	3	Sergio Fernández	Spain	50.89	
28	4	4	Thomas Kain	Austria	50.90	PB
29	2	8	Nicolai Hartling	Denmark	51.15	
30	5	2	Øyvind Kjerpeset	Norway	51.23	
31	1	5	Jonathan Puemi	Switzerland	51.40	=SB
32	5	1	Jason Harvey	Ireland	51.91	
33	3	3	Yann Eloi Senjarić	Croatia	52.14	
34	2	3	Jaak-Heinrich Jagor	Estonia	52.67	
35	5	4	Jacques Frisch	Luxembourg	54.06	
36	4	7	Alexei Cravcenco	Moldova	55.66	

=== Semifinals ===
First 2 in each heat (Q) and 2 best performers (q) advance to the Final.

Rank	Heat	Lane	Name	Nationality	Time	Note
1	3	3	Rasmus Mägi	Estonia	48.54	Q, EL, NR
2	3	8	Timofey Chalyy	Russia	48.69	Q
3	3	5	Felix Franz	Germany	48.96	q, PB
4	3	7	Oskari Mörö	Finland	49.08	q, NR
5	1	5	Denis Kudryavtsev	Russia	49.09	Q
6	1	4	Varg Königsmark	Germany	49.12	Q, PB
7	1	6	Patryk Dobek	Poland	49.13	PB
8	2	3	Kariem Hussein	Switzerland	49.16	Q
9	2	6	Emir Bekrić	Serbia	49.21	Q, SB
10	2	5	Thomas Barr	Ireland	49.30	
11	1	3	Sebastian Rodger	Great Britain	49.47	SB
12	3	4	Michaël Bultheel	Belgium	49.62	
13	2	4	Yoann Décimus	France	49.71	
14	3	6	Niall Flannery	Great Britain	50.15	
15	1	8	Leonardo Capotosti	Italy	50.21	
16	3	2	Denys Nechyporenko	Ukraine	50.35	
17	1	7	Michal Brož	Czech Republic	50.39	
18	2	8	Tom Burton	Great Britain	50.47	
19	1	2	Stanislav Melnykov	Ukraine	50.60	SB
20	2	2	Stef Vanhaeren	Belgium	50.63	
21	2	1	Oleg Mironov	Russia	50.69	
22	2	7	Máté Koroknai	Hungary	50.95	
23	1	1	Janis Baltušs	Latvia	50.96	
	3	1	Jussi Kanervo	Finland	DNS	

=== Final ===
Rank	Lane	Name	Nationality	Time	Note
1st place, gold medalist(s)	5	Kariem Hussein	Switzerland	48.96	PB
2nd place, silver medalist(s)	3	Rasmus Mägi	Estonia	49.06	
3rd place, bronze medalist(s)	6	Denis Kudryavtsev	Russia	49.16	
4	4	Timofey Chalyy	Russia	49.56	
5	2	Felix Franz	Germany	49.83	
6	7	Emir Bekrić	Serbia	49.90	
7	8	Varg Königsmark	Germany	49.91	
8	1	Oskari Mörö	Finland	50.14	
