= Oskari Mörö =

Finnish hurdler (born 1993)

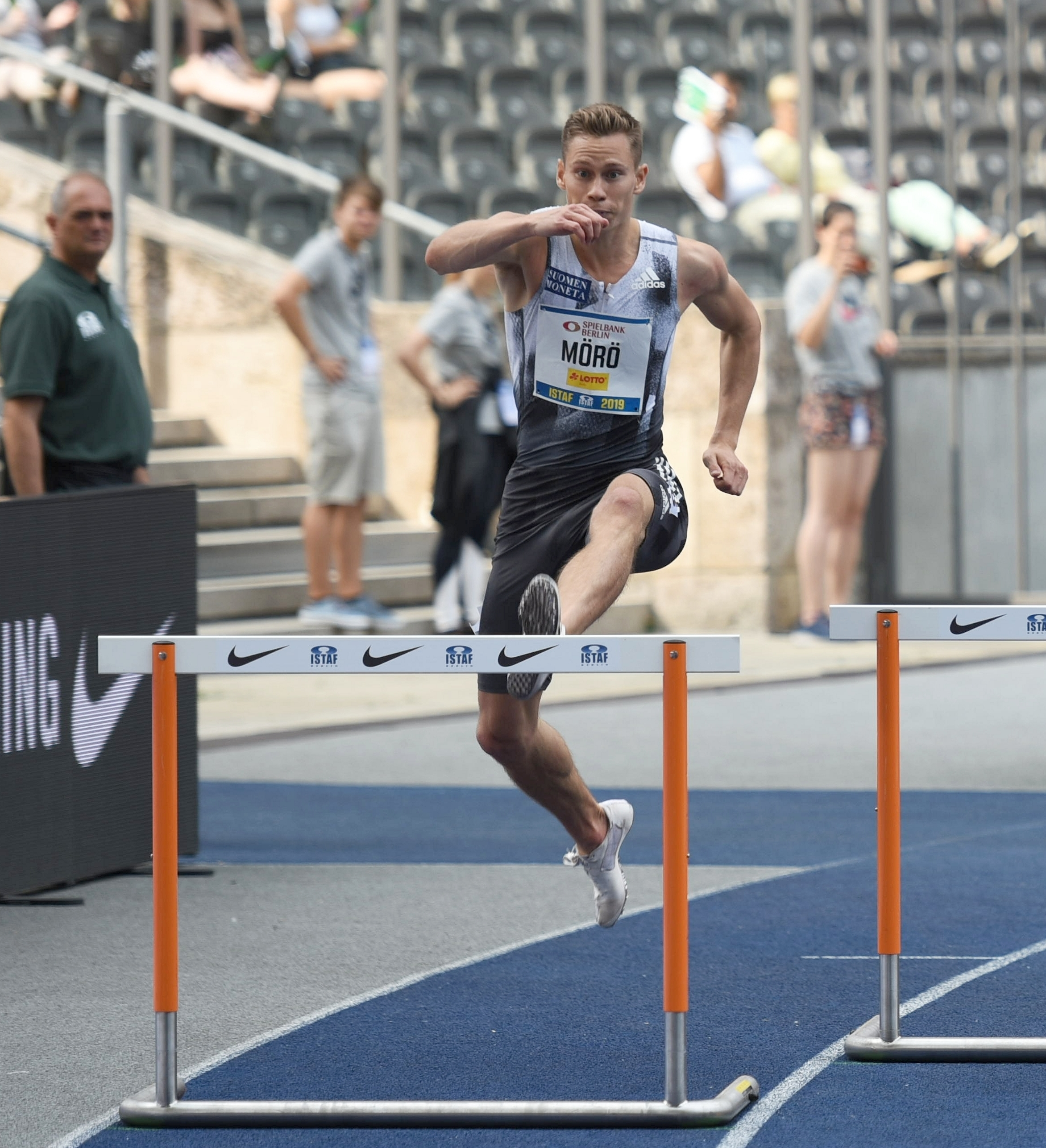
- Mörö at the ISTAF Berlin 2019

Personal information
- Born: January 31, 1993 (age 33) Lohja, Finland
- Height: 1.81 m (5 ft 11 in)
- Weight: 71 kg (157 lb)

Sport
- Country: Finland
- Sport: Athletics
- Event: 400m Hurdles

Achievements and titles
- Personal best: 49.04 (NR)
- Updated on 13 August 2014

Santtu Oskari Mörö (born 31 January 1993 in Lohja) is a Finnish hurdler.

Mörö recorded his new personal best time of 49.08 in his semifinal heat in 2014 European Championships, and also made a new national record. Mörö was the last competitor to qualify for the final.

== Competition record ==
Year	Competition	Venue	Position	Event	Notes
Representing Finland
2010	Youth Olympic Games	Singapore	3rd (h)	400 m hurdles (84 cm)	52.70
2011	European Junior Championships	Tallinn, Estonia	7th	400 m hurdles	51.06
2012	World Junior Championships	Barcelona, Spain	6th	400 m hurdles	50.80
2012	European Championships	Helsinki, Finland	26th (h)	400 m hurdles	51.59
2012	European Championships	Helsinki, Finland	12th (h)	4 × 400 m relay	3:10.26
2014	European Championships	Zürich, Switzerland	8th	400 m hurdles	50.14
2015	European U23 Championships	Tallinn, Estonia	6th	400 m hurdles	50.27
2016	European Championships	Amsterdam, Netherlands	4th	400 m hurdles	49.24
2016	Olympic Games	Rio de Janeiro, Brazil	20th (sf)	400 m hurdles	49.75
2017	Universiade	Taipei, Taiwan	15th (sf)	400 m hurdles	51.04
2017	Universiade	Taipei, Taiwan	7th	4 × 100 m relay	40.37
