= Sebastian Rodger =

British hurdler (born 1991)

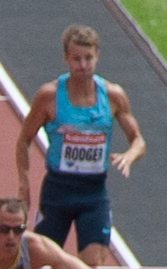
- Sebastian Rodger in 2013

Personal information
- Nationality: British (English)
- Born: 29 June 1991 (age 34) Brighton, England
- Education: St.Bedes School
- Height: 1.60 m (5 ft 3 in)
- Weight: 70 kg (154 lb)

Sport
- Sport: Athletics
- Event: 400 metres hurdles
- Club: Shaftesbury Barnet Harriers
- Coached by: Stephen King; James Hillier (2013–2015)

Sebastian William Gregory Rodger (born 29 June 1991) is a British athlete specialising in the 400 metres hurdles. In 2013, he won a silver medal at the European U23 Championships and reached the semifinals of the World Championships. He also competed at the 2016 Olympic Games in Rio de Janeiro, Brazil.

== Biography ==
Rodger, who was born in Brighton, began concentrating on the 400 metres hurdles in 2011, having previously been a decathlete with a personal best score of 7200 points in 2010. His personal best in the 400 metres hurdles is 49.19 seconds set in Tampere in 2013, when winning a silver medal at the European U23 Championships. He was a semi-finalist at the 2013 World Championships.

In June 2016, he became the British 400 metres hurdles champion after winning the 2016 British Athletics Championships in 49.45 secs, before running a season's best of 49.29 in Oordegem in July to seal Olympic selection.

At the 2016 Olympic Games in Rio, he represented Great Britain, where he was eliminated in the heats running 49.54 secs.

== Competition record ==
Year	Competition	Venue	Position	Event	Notes
Representing Great Britain and England
2010	World Junior Championships	Moncton, Canada	3rd	4x400 m relay	3:06.49
2013	European U23 Championships	Tampere, Finland	2nd	400 m hurdles	49.19
2013	World Championships	Moscow, Russia	15th (sf)	400 m hurdles	49.32
2014	Commonwealth Games	Glasgow, United Kingdom	13th (h)	400 m hurdles	50.71
2014	European Championships	Zürich, Switzerland	11th (sf)	400 m hurdles	49.47
2016	Olympic Games	Rio de Janeiro, Brazil	23rd (h)	400 m hurdles	49.54
2018	World Indoor Championships	Birmingham, United Kingdom	4th (h)	4x400 m relay	3:05.29
2018	European Championships	Berlin, Germany	20th (h)	400 m hurdles	51.30
