= Athletics at the 2014 Commonwealth Games – Men's 400 metres hurdles =

Men's 400 metres hurdles at the Commonwealth Games

The Men's 400 metres hurdles at the 2014 Commonwealth Games, as part of the athletics programme, took place at Hampden Park between 29 and 31 July 2014.

== Heat 1 ==
| Rank | Lane | Name | Reaction Time | Result | Notes |
|---|---|---|---|---|---|
| 1 | - | Jehue Gordon (TRI) | 0.161 | 49.42 | Q |
| 2 | - | Annsert Whyte (JAM) | 0.193 | 49.58 | Q |
| 3 | - | Cristian Morton (NGR) | 0.193 | 49.62 | q |
| 4 | - | Niall Flannery (ENG) | 0.159 | 49.97 | q |
| 5 | - | Nicholas Bett (KEN) | 0.182 | 51.21 | |
| DQ | - | Kurt Couto (MOZ) | 0.161 | DQ | |
| DNS | - | Siologa Viliamu Sepa (SAM) | - | - | |

== Heat 2 ==
| Rank | Lane | Name | Reaction Time | Result | Notes |
|---|---|---|---|---|---|
| 1 | - | Cornel Fredericks (RSA) | 0.159 | 49.26 | Q |
| 2 | - | Jeffery Gibson (BAH) | 0.160 | 49.66 | Q |
| 3 | - | Ian Dewhurst (AUS) | 0.173 | 50.45 | |
| 4 | - | Seb Rodger (ENG) | 0.193 | 50.71 | |
| 5 | - | Jason Harvey (NIR) | 0.213 | 52.06 | |
| DQ | - | Mowen Boino (PNG) | 0.184 | DQ | |
| DQ | - | Leford Green (JAM) | 0.181 | DQ | |

== Heat 3 ==
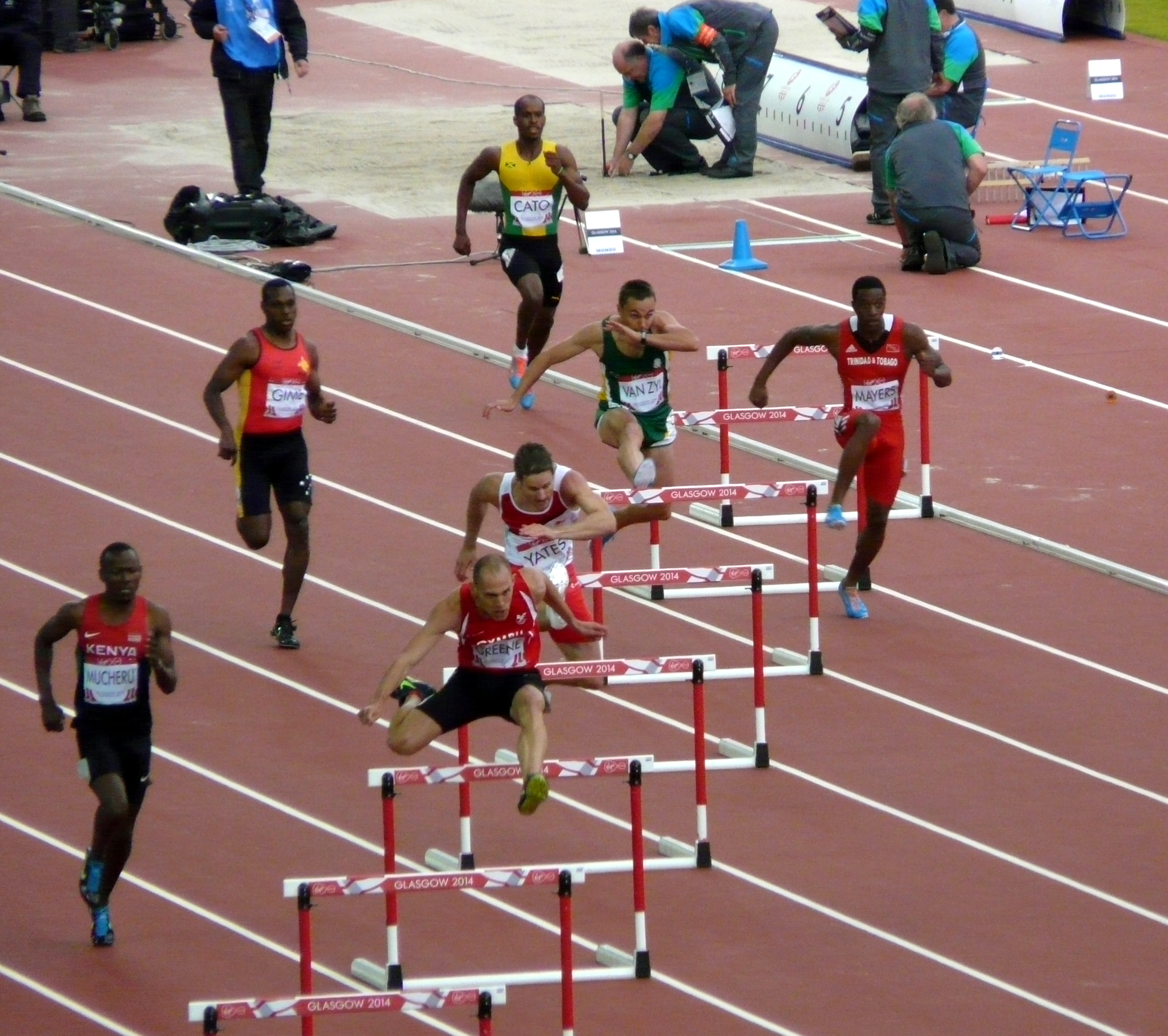
Heat 3

| Rank | Lane | Name | Reaction Time | Result | Notes |
|---|---|---|---|---|---|
| 1 | - | Boniface Mucheru (KEN) | 0.188 | 49.67 | Q |
| 2 | - | Richard Yates (ENG) | 0.202 | 49.80 | Q |
| 3 | - | L. J. van Zyl (RSA) | 0.179 | 50.07 | |
| 4 | - | Dai Greene (WAL) | 0.170 | 50.36 | |
| 5 | - | Emanuel Mayers (TRI) | 0.183 | 50.51 | |
| 6 | - | Wala Gime (PNG) | 0.209 | 53.62 | |
| DQ | - | Roxroy Cato (JAM) | 0.160 | DQ | |

== Final ==
| Rank | Lane | Name | Reaction Time | Result | Notes |
|---|---|---|---|---|---|
| 1st place, gold medalist(s) | - | Cornel Fredericks (RSA) | 0.156 | 48.50 | |
| 2nd place, silver medalist(s) | - | Jehue Gordon (TRI) | 0.170 | 48.75 | SB |
| 3rd place, bronze medalist(s) | - | Jeffery Gibson (BAH) | 0.159 | 48.78 | NR |
| 4 | - | Niall Flannery (ENG) | 0.160 | 49.46 | |
| 5 | - | Cristian Morton (NGR) | 0.225 | 49.65 | |
| 6 | - | Boniface Mucheru (KEN) | 0.167 | 49.99 | |
| 7 | - | Richard Yates (ENG) | 0.187 | 50.13 | |
| DNF | - | Annsert Whyte (JAM) | 0.181 | - | |
