= Estonia at the 2024 European Athletics Championships =

- Flag of Estonia
- WA code: EST

in Rome, Italy 7 June 2024 – 12 June 2022
- Competitors: 19 (10 men and 9 women)
- Medals Ranked 17th: Gold 1 Silver 0 Bronze 0 Total 1

European Athletics Championships appearances (overview)
- 1934; 1938; 1946–1990; 1994; 1998; 2002; 2006; 2010; 2012; 2014; 2016; 2018; 2022; 2024

Other related appearances
- Soviet Union (1946–1990)

Estonia competed at the 2024 European Athletics Championships in Rome, Italy from 7–12 June 2024.

== Medallists ==
Medal	Name	Event	Date
Gold	Johannes Erm	Men's decathlon	11 June

== Results ==
Estonia entered the following athletes.

Key

- Q = Qualified for the next round
- q = Qualified for the next round as a fastest loser or, in field events, by position without achieving the qualifying target
- NR = National record
- PB = Personal best
- SB = Season best
- N/A = Round not applicable for the event

=== Men ===
Track and road events

Athlete	Event	Heat		Semifinal		Final	
Athlete	Event	Result	Rank	Result	Rank	Result	Rank
Karl Erik Nazarov	100 metres	10.49 SB	19	Did not advance			
Olavi Allase	Half marathon	—				1:07:48	53
Leonid Latsepov	Half marathon	—				1:07:09	51
Tiidrek Nurme	Half marathon	—				1:05:00 SB	40
Olavi Allase; Leonid Latsepov; Tiidrek Nurme	Half marathon team	—				3:19:57	10
Rasmus Mägi	400 metres hurdles	Bye		48.43 SB	5 Q	48.13 SB	4

Field events

Athlete	Event	Qualification		Final	
Athlete	Event	Distance	Position	Distance	Position
Jander Heil	Shot put	19.14	19	Did not advance	
Adam Kelly	Hammer throw	73.92	13	Did not advance	

Combined events – Decathlon

Athlete	Event	100 m	LJ	SP	HJ	400 m	110H	DT	PV	JT	1500 m	Final	Rank
Johannes Erm	Result	10.60 PB	7.91 SB	14.99	1.99	46.81 PB	14.30	44.56	5.20 PB	62.71 PB	4:24.95 SB	8764 WL	1st place, gold medalist(s)
Johannes Erm	Points	952	1038	789	794	968	936	758	972	779	778	8764 WL	1st place, gold medalist(s)
Risto Lillemets	Result	11.03	7.16 SB	14.22	1.99 SB	49.69	DNF	45.40 SB	DNS	DNF			
Risto Lillemets	Points	854	852	742	794	829	0	775	0	DNF			
Janek Õiglane	Result	10.97 SB	7.34 SB	14.76 SB	1.84 SB	DNF							
Janek Õiglane	Points	867	896	775	661	DNF							

Decathlete Karel Tilga withdrew due to injury.

=== Women ===
Track and road events

Athlete	Event	Heat		Semifinal		Final	
Athlete	Event	Result	Rank	Result	Rank	Result	Rank
Ann Marii Kivikas	200 metres	23.78	22	Did not advance			
Laura Maasik	3000 metres steeplechase	9:44.20 NR	10	—		Did not advance	
Miia Ott; Ann Marii Kivikas; Kreete Verlin; Diana Suumann	4 × 100 metres relay	53.37	16	—		Did not advance	

Field events

Athlete	Event	Qualification		Final	
Athlete	Event	Distance	Position	Distance	Position
Elisabeth Pihela	High jump	1.85	19	Did not advance	
Marleen Mülla	Pole vault	4.40	16	Did not advance	
Gedly Tugi	Javelin throw	56.43	15	Did not advance	
