= Anne Mägi =

Estonian track & field athlete and coach

Personal information
- Spouse: Taivo Mägi

Anne Mägi (until 1980 Sookael; 1980-1989 Meri; born on 26 January 1960 in Paide) is an Estonian track and field athlete and coach.

1979-1985 she won several medals at Estonian Athletics Championships.

Students: Grit Šadeiko, Maris Mägi ja Rasmus Mägi.

Awards:

- 2014: Estonian Coach of the Year

== Personal life ==
She is married to track and field athlete and coach Taivo Mägi. Her son is hurdler Rasmus Mägi and daughter is sprinter Maris Mägi.
