= Taivo Mägi =

Estonian track & field athlete and coach

Personal information
- Born: 19 October 1960 (age 65)
- Height: 173 cm (5 ft 8 in)
- Weight: 65 kg (143 lb; 10 st 3 lb)

Sport
- Country: Estonia Soviet Union

Achievements and titles
- Personal bests: 400 m: 48,2 (1983); 800 m: 1.47,9 (1985); 400 mh: 53,36 (1984)

Taivo Mägi (born 19 October 1960 in Tartu) is an Estonian track and field athlete and coach.

In 1986 he graduated from Tartu State University in physical education.

1980–1986 he become 6-times Estonian champion in different running disciplines. 1980–1986 he was a member of Estonian national team.

Since 1987 he is working as a coach.

Students: Grit Šadeiko, Maris Mägi, Rasmus Mägi.

Awards:

- 2014: Estonian Coach of the Year

== Personal life ==
He is married to track and field athlete and coach Anne Mägi. Their son is hurdler Rasmus Mägi and their daughter is sprinter Maris Mägi.
