= Estonia at the 2022 European Athletics Championships =

- Flag of Estonia
- WA code: EST
- National federation: Estonian Athletic Association

in Munich, Germany 15 August 2022 – 21 August 2022
- Competitors: 12 (9 men and 3 women) in 8 events
- Medals Ranked 28th: Gold 0 Silver 0 Bronze 1 Total 1

European Athletics Championships appearances (overview)
- 1934; 1938; 1946–1990; 1994; 1998; 2002; 2006; 2010; 2012; 2014; 2016; 2018; 2022; 2024

Other related appearances
- Soviet Union (1946–1990)

Estonia competed at the 2022 European Athletics Championships in Munich, Germany, between 15 and 21 August 2022. A delegation of 12 athletes were sent to represent the country.

== Medallists ==
Medal	Name	Event	Date
Bronze	Janek Õiglane	Men's decathlon	16 August

== Results ==
=== Men ===
Track and road events

Athlete	Event	Heat		Semifinal		Final	
Athlete	Event	Result	Rank	Result	Rank	Result	Rank
Karl Erik Nazarov	100 m	10.39	13	Did not advance			
Roman Fosti	Marathon	—				2:19:34	41
Kaur Kivistik	Marathon	—				2:17:51	32
Tiidrek Nurme	Marathon	—				2:12:46	11
Estonia	Marathon team	—				6:50:11	6
Keiso Pedriks	110 m hurdles	13.83	11	Did not advance			

Field events

Athlete	Event	Qualification		Final	
Athlete	Event	Distance	Position	Distance	Position
Hans-Christian Hausenberg	Long jump	NM	–	Did not advance	

Combined events – Decathlon

Athlete	Event	100 m	LJ	SP	HJ	400 m	110H	DT	PV	JT	1500 m	Final	Rank
Janek Õiglane	Result	11.01	7.27 SB	14.82	2.02	48.80 PB	14.39	41.97	5.10	70.94	4:42.78	8346	3rd place, bronze medalist(s)
Janek Õiglane	Points	858	878	779	822	871	925	705	941	904	663	8346	3rd place, bronze medalist(s)
Karel Tilga	Result	11.27 SB	7.28 SB	15.21 SB	1.96 SB	50.66 SB	15.16 SB	49.91	NM	DNS		DNF	-
Karel Tilga	Points	801	881	803	767	784	830	869	0	-	-	DNF	-
Maicel Uibo	Result	11.30	7.23	14.55	2.08	50.21 SB	14.79	46.59	5.30 =SB	62.74	4:42.18	8234	5
Maicel Uibo	Points	795	869	762	878	805	875	800	1004	779	667	8234	5

=== Women ===
Track and road events

Athlete	Event	Heat		Semifinal		Final	
Athlete	Event	Result	Rank	Result	Rank	Result	Rank
Marielle Kleemeier	400 m hurdles	57.46	21	Did not advance			

Field events

Athlete	Event	Qualification		Final	
Athlete	Event	Distance	Position	Distance	Position
Karmen Bruus	High jump	1.83	15	Did not advance	
Gedly Tugi	Javelin throw	54.38	18	Did not advance	

== See also ==
- Estonia at the 2022 European Championships
