= Ibrahim Mohammed Saleh =

Palestinian poet (1931–2014)

- إبراهيم محمد صالح
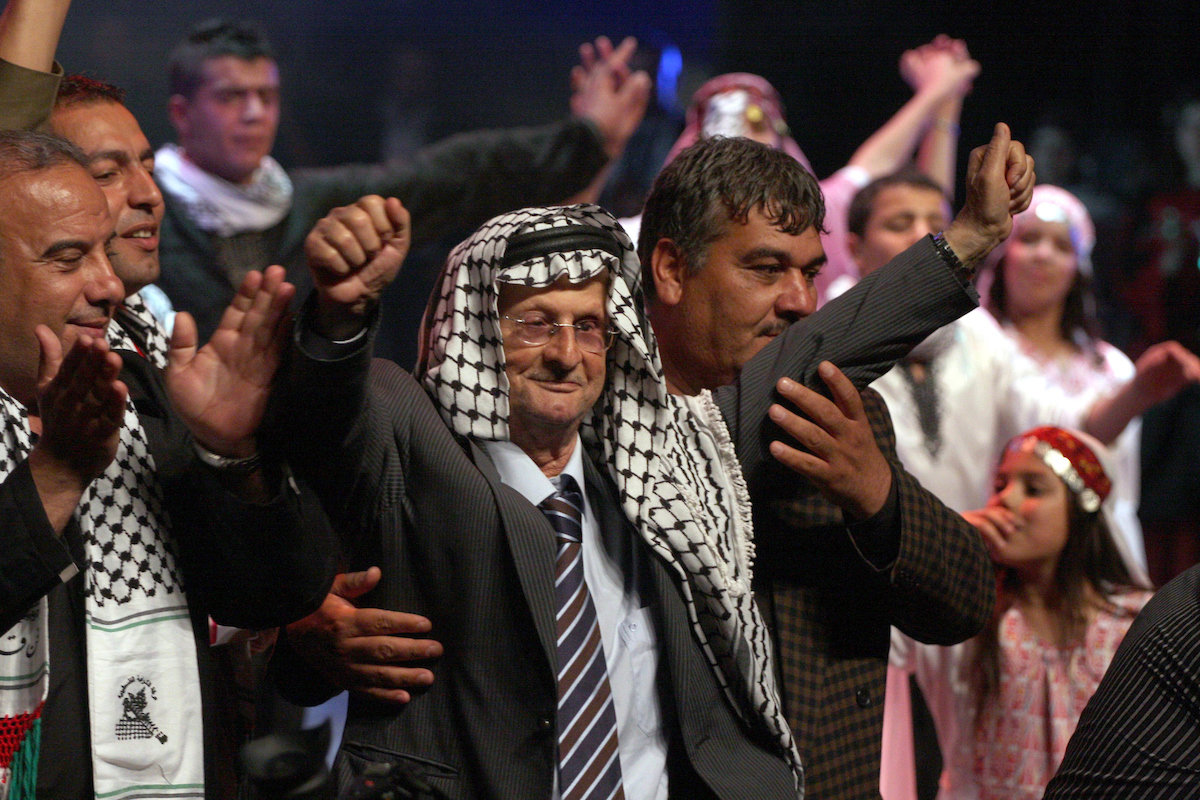
- Abo Arab in Ramallah, 8 May 2011
- Born: Ibrahim Mohammed Saleh; 1931; Al-Shajara, Mandatory Palestine
- Died: 2 March 2014 (aged 82–83); Homs, Syria
- Occupations: Singer; Poet

Ibrahim Mohammed Saleh, commonly known as Abu Arab, nicknamed Poet of the Palestinian revolution, (1931 – 2 March 2014) was a Palestinian artist and poet. He was born in Al-Shajara during the British mandate in Palestine. He lived in exile for 63 years before returning to his homeland in 2011 to participate in a cultural festival. He and his family was forced to flee during the Nakba to Syria where they ended up in Homs. Saleh lost his father in 1948 and his son in the 1982 Lebanon War.

== Death ==
Abo Arab died in Homs, Syria on 2 March 2014 at age 83, due to illness. The Palestinian President Mahmoud Abbas and Hamas mourned his death.
