= Eusebio Haliti =

Italian athlete

Personal information
- Nationality: Albanian and Italian
- Born: 1 January 1991 (age 35) Shkodër, Albania
- Height: 1.87 m (6 ft 1 1/2 in)
- Weight: 73 kg (161 lb)

Sport
- Country: Italy
- Sport: Athletics
- Event(s): 400 m 400 m hs
- Club: G.S. Esercito

Achievements and titles
- Personal bests: 400 m: 46.78 (2011); 400 m hs: 49.85 (2013)

Eusebio Haliti (born 1 January 1991) is an Albanian and Italian of Albanian descent male retired sprinter and hurdler, who participated at the 2013 World Championships in Athletics.

== Achievements ==
Year	Competition	Venue	Position	Event	Time	Notes
2013	World Championships	(Russia) Moscow	semi	4x100 metres relay	3:03.88	SB

== See also ==
- List of Albanian records in athletics
