= 2018 European Athletics Championships – Men's 400 metres hurdles =

Men's 400 metres hurdles at the 2018 European Athletics Championships
- Venue: Olympic Stadium
- Location: Berlin
- Dates: August 6 (round 1); August 7 (semifinals); August 9 (final)
- Competitors: 36 from 23 nations
- Winning time: 47.64

Medalists
gold medal	Karsten Warholm	Norway
silver medal	Yasmani Copello	Turkey
bronze medal	Thomas Barr	Ireland

The men's 400 metres hurdles at the 2018 European Athletics Championships took place at the Olympic Stadium on 6, 7 and 9 August.

== Records ==
Standing records prior to the 2018 European Athletics Championships
World record	Kevin Young (USA)	46.78	Barcelona, Spain	6 August 1992
European record	Stéphane Diagana (FRA)	47.37	Lausanne, Switzerland	5 July 1995
Championship record	Harald Schmid (FRG)	47.48	Athens, Greece	8 September 1982
World Leading	Abderrahman Samba (QAT)	46.98	Paris, France	30 June 2018
European Leading	Karsten Warholm (NOR)	47.65	London, Great Britain	21 July 2018
Broken records during the 2018 European Athletics Championships
European Leading	Karsten Warholm (NOR)	47.64	Berlin, Germany	9 August 2018

== Schedule ==
Date	Time	Round
6 August 2016	17:05	Round 1
7 August 2016	19:45	Semifinals
9 August 2016	20:15	Final

All times are local times (UTC+2)

== Results ==
=== Round 1 ===
First 2 in each heat (Q) and the next fastest 5 (q) advance to the Semifinals. 11 fastest entrants awarded bye to Semifinals.

Rank	Heat	Lane	Name	Nationality	Time	Note
1	3	6	Victor Coroller	France	50.10	Q
2	4	8	Denys Nechyporenko	Ukraine	50.26	Q, SB
3	4	7	Tibor Koroknai	Hungary	50.34	Q
4	3	4	Alain-Hervé Mfomkpa	Switzerland	50.34	Q
5	1	8	Maksims Sinčukovs	Latvia	50.39	Q, SB
6	3	5	Emir Bekrić	Serbia	50.46	q, SB
7	1	5	Jaak-Heinrich Jagor	Estonia	50.47	Q
8	2	7	Muhammad Abdallah Kounta	France	50.60	Q
9	3	7	Máté Koroknai	Hungary	50.70	q
10	1	6	Aleksandr Skorobogatko	Authorised Neutral Athletes	50.74	q
11	3	3	Michal Brož	Czech Republic	50.74	q
12	2	4	Martin Kučera	Slovakia	50.75	Q
13	4	4	José Reynaldo Bencosme de Leon	Italy	50.80	q
14	1	3	Dany Brand	Switzerland	50.82	SB
15	1	7	Nick Smidt	Netherlands	50.96	
16	4	6	Vít Müller	Czech Republic	51.00	
17	2	8	Danylo Danylenko	Ukraine	51.02	
18	2	5	Jakub Mordyl	Poland	51.15	
19	4	5	Isak Andersson	Sweden	51.18	
20	2	3	Sebastian Rodger	Great Britain	51.30	
21	1	4	Martin Tuček	Czech Republic	51.63	
22	2	6	Aleix Porras	Spain	51.69	
23	3	2	Diogo Mestre	Portugal	52.65	
24	4	3	Hrvoje Čukman	Croatia	52.93	
25	3	8	Andrea Ercolani Volta	San Marino	53.86	
	1	2	Dai Greene	Great Britain	DNS	

=== Semifinals ===
First 2 (Q) and next 2 fastest (q) qualify for the final.

Rank	Heat	Lane	Name	Nationality	Time	Note
1	1	6	Karsten Warholm*	Norway	48.67	Q
2	1	4	Patryk Dobek*	Poland	48.75	Q, SB
3	2	6	Rasmus Mägi*	Estonia	48.80	Q, SB
4	3	6	Yasmani Copello*	Turkey	48.88	Q
5	2	4	Ludvy Vaillant*	France	48.88	Q
6	2	3	Timofey Chalyy*	Authorised Neutral Athletes	48.89	q, SB
7	3	5	Thomas Barr*	Ireland	49.10	Q
8	2	5	Sergio Fernández*	Spain	49.19	q, SB
9	1	3	Luke Campbell*	Germany	49.20	
10	2	7	Tibor Koroknai	Hungary	49.24	PB
11	1	5	Victor Coroller	France	49.34	SB
12	3	3	Lorenzo Vergani*	Italy	49.41	
13	3	8	Muhammad Abdallah Kounta	France	49.58	
14	3	2	Máté Koroknai	Hungary	49.77	PB
15	3	4	Jack Green*	Great Britain	49.84	
16	1	7	José Reynaldo Bencosme de Leon	Italy	49.86	
17	3	1	Denys Nechyporenko	Ukraine	50.27	
18	2	1	Martin Kučera	Slovakia	50.30	SB
19	1	2	Michal Brož	Czech Republic	50.31	
20	2	2	Maksims Sinčukovs	Latvia	50.33	NU23R
21	1	8	Jaak-Heinrich Jagor	Estonia	50.41	
22	2	8	Alain-Hervé Mfomkpa	Switzerland	50.71	
23	1	1	Emir Bekrić	Serbia	50.96	
	3	7	Aleksandr Skorobogatko	Authorised Neutral Athletes	DNF	

=== Final ===
Rank	Lane	Name	Nationality	Time	Note
1st place, gold medalist(s)	6	Karsten Warholm	Norway	47.64	EU23R, EL, NR
2nd place, silver medalist(s)	4	Yasmani Copello	Turkey	47.81	NR
3rd place, bronze medalist(s)	8	Thomas Barr	Ireland	48.31	SB
4	7	Ludvy Vaillant	France	48.42	PB
5	3	Patryk Dobek	Poland	48.59	SB
6	5	Rasmus Mägi	Estonia	48.75	SB
7	2	Sergio Fernández	Spain	48.98	SB
8	1	Timofey Chalyy	Authorised Neutral Athletes	49.41	
