= Jaak-Heinrich Jagor =

Estonian hurdler (born 1990)

Personal information
- Born: 11 May 1990 (age 36) Pärnu, Estonia
- Height: 1.90 m (6 ft 3 in)
- Weight: 80 kg (176 lb)

Sport
- Country: Estonia
- Sport: Athletics
- Event: 400 metres hurdles
- Club: SK Altius; Tartu SS Kalev
- Coached by: Mehis Viru; Kersti Viru

Achievements and titles
- Personal bests: 400 m: 47.65 (Vaasa 2017); 400 mh: 49.37 (Tallinn 2015)

Jaak-Heinrich Jagor (born 11 May 1990) is an Estonian hurdler. He competed in the 400 metres hurdles event at the 2015 World Championships in Beijing without qualifying for the final. His personal best in the 400 metres hurdles is 49.37 seconds set in Tallinn in 2015.

== Competition record ==
Year	Competition	Venue	Position	Event	Result
Representing Estonia
2009	European Junior Championships	Novi Sad, Serbia	26th (h)	110 m hurdles (99 cm)	14.50
2014	European Championships	Zürich, Switzerland	34th (h)	400 m hurdles	52.67
2015	World Championships	Beijing, China	36th (h)	400 m hurdles	50.29
2016	European Championships	Amsterdam, Netherlands	13th (sf)	400 m hurdles	49.65
2016	European Championships	Amsterdam, Netherlands	15th (h)	4 × 400 m relay	3:10.63
2016	Olympic Games	Rio de Janeiro, Brazil	30th (h)	400 m hurdles	49.78
2017	World Championships	London, United Kingdom	19th (sf)	400 m hurdles	50.43
2017	Universiade	Taipei, Taiwan	8th	400 m hurdles	50.71
2018	European Championships	Berlin, Germany	21st (sf)	400 m hurdles	50.41
