= Nicolai Hartling =

Danish hurdler

Personal information
- Born: 17 January 1994 (age 32)

Sport
- Country: Denmark

Johan Nicolai Trock Hartling (born 17 January 1994 in Hørsholm) is a Danish hurdler.

He established several national records on 400 m hurdles, the last one of 50.01, finishing third at 2019 European Team Championships.
