= Maris Mägi =

Estonian sprinter

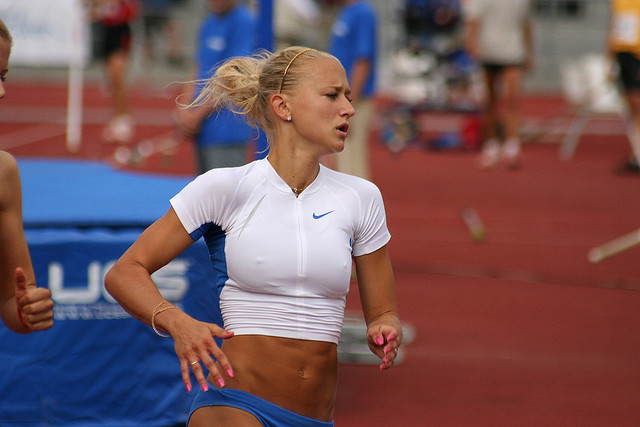
- Maris Mägi at Kadrioru stadium, Tallinn, Estonia on July 22, 2006

Personal information
- Full name: Maris Mägi
- Born: 11 August 1987 (age 38) Tartu, then part of Estonian SSR, Soviet Union

Sport
- Country: Estonia
- Sport: Sprinting
- Personal bests: 100 m: 12.15 (2014); 400 m: 52.21 (2011); 400 mh: 56.56 NR (2013)

Maris Mägi (born 11 August 1987 in Tartu) is an Estonian sprinter who specializes in the 400 metres.

Maris Mägi's parents are track and field athletes Taivo Mägi and Anne Mägi. Her younger brother is hurdler Rasmus Mägi.

== Achievements ==
Year	Competition	Venue	Position	Event	Result
Representing Estonia
2004	World Junior Championships	Grosseto, Italy	19th (h)	400 m	54.93
2005	European Indoor Championships	Madrid, Spain	13th (h)	400 m	54.44
2006	World Junior Championships	Beijing, China	13th (sf)	400 m	53.74
2007	European Indoor Championships	Birmingham, United Kingdom	13th (h)	400 m	53.16
2007	European U23 Championships	Debrecen, Hungary	12th (h)	400m	53.90
2007	Universiade	Bangkok, Thailand	8th	400 m	54.21
2009	European Indoor Championships	Turin, Italy	6th (sf)	400 m	53.43
2009	European U23 Championships	Kaunas, Lithuania	9th (sf)	400m	53.85
2010	World Indoor Championships	Doha, Qatar	12th (sf)	400 m	53.30
2010	European Championships	Barcelona, Spain	11th (h)	400 m	52.85
2011	Universiade	Shenzhen, China	8th	400 m	53.92
2012	European Championships	Helsinki, Finland	–	400 m	DQ
2014	European Championships	Zürich, Switzerland	24th (h)	400 m hurdles	63.04
2015	Universiade	Gwangju, South Korea	8th	400 m hurdles	59.49

== Personal ==
Her brother Rasmus is also an athlete.
