= Rasmus Mägi =

Estonian hurdler

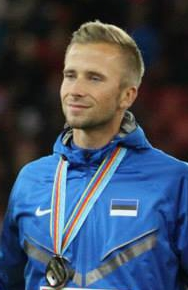
- Mägi in 2014.

Personal information
- Born: May 4, 1992 (age 34) Tartu, Estonia
- Height: 1.88 m (6 ft 2 in)
- Weight: 74 kg (163 lb)

Sport
- Country: Estonia
- Sport: Athletics
- Event: 400 metres hurdles

Achievements and titles
- Personal best: 47.82 (400 hs) 45.35 (400) both NR
Medal record
European Games
Silver medal – second place	2023 Kraków-Małopolska	400 m hurdles
European Championships
Silver medal – second place	2014 Zürich	400 m hurdles
European U23 Championships
Bronze medal – third place	2013 Tampere	400 m hurdles

Rasmus Mägi (born 4 May 1992) is an Estonian hurdler. At the 2012 Summer Olympics, he competed in the Men's 400 metres hurdles without qualifying for the semifinals. He won the silver medal at the 2014 European Championships. Mägi came in sixth at the 2016 Olympic Games with a national record of 48.40s and in seventh at the 2024 Olympic finals.

== Career ==
Coaches by his parents Anne and Taivo, Mägi started out as a multi eventer, before focusing on 400 metres hurdles. He competed at the 2012 Olympic Games in London, finish inf fifth in his heat. He won the bronze medal at the 2013 European Athletics U23 Championships. His first senior medal followed the following year when he won the silver medal at the 2014 European Athletics Championships in Zurich, Switzerland in a time of 49.06 seconds. At the 2016 Olympic Games in Brazil he became the first athlete to represent Estonia in an Olympic track final, placing sixth overall in a 48.40 national record from the inside lane. Straight after that, competing in Lausanne he won his Diamond League event.

He finished in seventh place in the final of delayed 2020 Olympic Games in Tokyo, Japan in 2021, setting an Estonian record. He was named by the Estonian Sports Press Association as the male Estonian athlete of the year in December 2021. In June 2022, Mägi set a new national record in the 400m hurdles at the Paavo Nurmi Games in Turku, Finland, crossing the finish line in 47.82 seconds. After recovering from a stress fracture diagnosed in August 2022, he finishes seventh in the final of the 2023 World Athletics Championships in Budapest, Hungary.

Competing in the 400m hurdles at the 2024 European Athletics Championships in Rome, Mägi set a new seasons best of 48.43 seconds in his semi-final. In the final, he ran 48.13 seconds to finish in fourth place. He reached his third Olympic final at the 2024 Paris Olympics, but fell trying to clear a hurdle on the closing straight and finished seventh overall.

== International competitions ==
Year	Competition	Venue	Position	Event	Result
Representing Estonia
2009	World Youth Championships	Brixen, Italy	13th (sf)	400 m hurdles (84 cm)	53.97
2010	World Junior Championships	Moncton, Canada	36th (h)	400 m hurdles	53.86
2011	European Indoor Championships	Paris, France	22nd (h)	400 m	48.49
2011	European Junior Championships	Tallinn, Estonia	4th	400 m hurdles	50.63
2011	Universiade	Shenzhen, China	9th (sf)	400 m hurdles	50.14
2012	European Championships	Helsinki, Finland	5th	400 m hurdles	50.01
2012	Olympic Games	London, United Kingdom	27th (h)	400 m hurdles	50.05
2013	European U23 Championships	Tampere, Finland	3rd	400 m hurdles	49.19
2013	World Championships	Moscow, Russia	16th (sf)	400 m hurdles	49.42
2014	European Championships	Zürich, Switzerland	2nd	400 m hurdles	49.06
2014	IAAF Continental Cup	Marrakesh, Morocco	4th	400 m hurdles	49.29
2015	World Championships	Beijing, China	13th (sf)	400 m hurdles	48.76
2016	European Championships	Amsterdam, Netherlands	10th (sf)	400 m hurdles	49.50
2016	Olympic Games	Rio de Janeiro, Brazil	6th	400 m hurdles	48.40
2018	European Championships	Berlin, Germany	6th	400 m hurdles	48.75
2019	World Championships	Doha, Qatar	9th (sf)	400 m hurdles	48.93
2021	Olympic Games	Tokyo, Japan	7th	400 m hurdles	48.11
2022	World Championships	Eugene, United States	8th	400 m hurdles	48.92
2023	European Games	Chorzów, Poland	2nd	400 m hurdles	48.63
2023	World Championships	Budapest, Hungary	7th	400 m hurdles	48.33
2024	European Championships	Rome, Italy	4th	400 m hurdles	48.13
2024	Olympic Games	Paris, France	7th	400 m hurdles	52.53

== Personal best ==
=== Outdoor ===
Event	Best	Location	Date	Notes
300 metres	32.89s	Pärnu, Estonia	21 August 2021	
400 metres	45.35s	Tallinn, Estonia	25 June 2022	NR
400 metres hurdles	47.82s	Turku, Finland	14 June 2022	NR

=== Indoor ===
Event	Best	Location	Date	Notes
300 metres	33.62s	Tallinn, Estonia	29 January 2012	NR
400 metres	47.23s	Tartu, Estonia	18 February 2012	

== Personal ==
Rasmus Mägi's parents are track and field athletes Taivo Mägi and Anne Mägi. His older sister is sprinter Maris Mägi.

Awards
Preceded by Nikolai Novosjolov; Mart Seim; Ott Tänak & Martin Järveoja	Estonian Athlete of the Year; 2014; 2016; 2021	Succeeded by Mart Seim; Ott Tänak; Janek Õiglane
