= 3x3 basketball at the 2023 African Games =

- Venue: LNC Legon Netball Court
- Location: Accra, Ghana
- Dates: 18–22 March 2024
- Competitors: 112 from 18 nations
- Teams: 28

3x3 basketball at the 2023 African Games was held from 18 to 22 March 2024 at the LNC Legon Netball Court in Accra, Ghana.

== Participating nations ==
NOC	Men	Women	Total athletes
Algeria	Yes	Yes	8
Benin	Yes	Yes	8
Botswana	Yes		4
Burkina Faso	Yes		4
Central African Republic	Yes		4
Democratic Republic of the Congo	Yes	Yes	8
Egypt	Yes	Yes	8
Ethiopia		Yes	4
Ghana	Yes	Yes	8
Ivory Coast	Yes	Yes	8
Kenya	Yes		4
Madagascar	Yes	Yes	8
Mali	Yes		4
Nigeria		Yes	4
Rwanda	Yes	Yes	8
Togo	Yes	Yes	8
Uganda	Yes	Yes	8
Zambia	Yes		4
Total: 18 NOCs	16	12	112

== Medalists ==
Event	Gold	Silver	Bronze
Men	Algeria	Ghana	Uganda
Women	Mali	Nigeria	DR Congo
Dunk contest	Soumaila Sissouma; Mali	Zimé Nazif Mora Lafia; Benin	Zayd Yahiaoui; Algeria
Shoot-out contest (mixed)	Habiba El-Gizawy; Egypt	Abdoul Sami Ouattara; Burkina Faso	Hannah Amoako; Ghana

== Medal table ==
* Host nation (Ghana)

Rank	Nation	Gold	Silver	Bronze	Total
1	Mali (MLI)	2	0	0	2
2	Algeria (ALG)	1	0	1	2
3	Egypt (EGY)	1	0	0	1
4	Ghana (GHA)*	0	1	1	2
5	Benin (BEN)	0	1	0	1
5	Burkina Faso (BUR)	0	1	0	1
5	Nigeria (NGR)	0	1	0	1
8	Democratic Republic of the Congo (COD)	0	0	1	1
8	Uganda (UGA)	0	0	1	1
Totals (9 entries)		4	4	4	12
