= Badminton at the 2023 African Games – Men's singles =

Men's singles at the 2023 African Games
- Venue: Borteyman Sports Complex
- Dates: 7–10 March 2024
- Competitors: 51 from 14 nations

Medalists
gold medal	Anuoluwapo Juwon Opeyori	Nigeria
silver medal	Godwin Olofua	Nigeria
bronze medal	Victor Ikechukwu	Nigeria
bronze medal	Adham Hatem Elgamal	Egypt

The badminton men's singles tournament at the 2023 African Games in Accra took place from 7 to 10 March 2024 at the Borteyman Sports Complex.

== Schedule ==
All times are Greenwich Mean Time (UTC±00:00)

Date	Time	Event
Thursday, 7 March 2024	09:00	Round of 64; Round of 32
Friday, 8 March 2024	09:00	Round of 16
Saturday, 9 March 2024	15:00	Quarter-finals
Sunday, 10 March 2024	09:00	Semi-finals
Sunday, 10 March 2024	15:00	Gold medal match

== Results ==
=== Seeds ===
1. Julien Paul (MRI) (quarter-finals)
2. Anuoluwapo Juwon Opeyori (NGR) (gold medalist)
3. Adham Hatem Elgamal (EGY) (bronze medalist)
4. Caden Kakora (RSA) (quarter-finals)
5. Adel Hamek (ALG) (quarter-finals)
6. Godwin Olofua (NGR) (silver medalist)
7. Kalombo Mulenga (ZAM) (quarter-finals)
8. Victor Ikechukwu (NGR) (bronze medalist)

=== Finals ===
Semi-finals
6	Godwin Olofua (NGR)	21	21
8	Victor Ikechukwu (NGR)	11	16
3	Adham Hatem Elgamal (EGY)	21	11	14
2	Anuoluwapo Juwon Opeyori (NGR)	15	21	21

Final
6	Godwin Olofua (NGR)	23	17	15
2	Anuoluwapo Juwon Opeyori (NGR)	21	21	21

=== Top half ===
==== Section 1 ====
First round
A F Tapsoba (BUR)	21	21	21
S Lamptey (GHA)	23	16	16
A Issa (TOG)	9	14
C Coetzer (RSA)	21	21
O A Fano-Dosh (BEN)	21	21
A Tamakloe (GHA)	8	16
A Elbahnasawy (EGY)	21	17	13
E Emuddu (UGA)	8	21	21

Second round
1	J Paul (MRI)	21	21
A F Tapsoba (BUR)	4	6
José Luis Nsogo (GEQ)	4	7
C Coetzer (RSA)	21	21
6	G Olofua (NGR)	21	21
O A Fano-Dosh (BEN)	5	11
M A Ouchefoun (ALG)	21	21
E Emuddu (UGA)	9	16

Third round
1	J Paul (MRI)	21	21
C Coetzer (RSA)	14	13
6	G Olofua (NGR)	21	12
M A Ouchefoun (ALG)	15	6^{r}

Quarter-finals
1	J Paul (MRI)	21	8	15
6	G Olofua (NGR)	11	21	21

==== Section 2 ====
First round
C C Ahouangassi (BEN)	21	21
E Ankou (TOG)	8	8
Teodomiro Obiang (GEQ)	12	12
L Semere (ERI)	21	21
M Lubega (UGA)	15	10
A Salah (EGY)	21	21
M A Belarbi (ALG)	21	21
M Ouedraogo (BUR)	7	13
C Mulenga (ZAM)	21	21
D N Mananga Nzoussi (CGO)	10	12

Second round
4	C Kakora (RSA)	21	21
C C Ahouangassi (BEN)	9	7
L N A Addo (GHA)	21	21
L Semere (ERI)	13	17
8	V Ikechukwu (NGR)	21	21
A Salah (EGY)	11	14
M A Belarbi (ALG)	15	16
C Mulenga (ZAM)	21	21

Third round
4	C Kakora (RSA)	23	21
L N A Addo (GHA)	21	5
8	V Ikechukwu (NGR)	21	22
C Mulenga (ZAM)	12	20

Quarter-finals
4	C Kakora (RSA)	16	21	15
8	V Ikechukwu (NGR)	21	16	21

=== Bottom half ===
==== Section 3 ====
First round
J B Bongout (MRI)	21	21
F Kafando (BUR)	12	13
A Abdul-Samad (GHA)	21	21
K Souleymann (TOG)	12	6
M Dimitri (CGO)
P Adomahou (BEN)	w	/	o
J E Emmy (NGR)	21	21
A Muyanja (UGA)	11	4
D K Lutonadio (GEQ)	5	13
S Larbaoui (ALG)	21	21

Second round
J B Bongout (MRI)	21	21
A Abdul-Samad (GHA)	10	14
P Adomahou (BEN)	12	11
7	K Mulenga (ZAM)	21	21
J E Emmy (NGR)	21	21
E Korampong (GHA)	9	8
S Larbaoui (ALG)	7	7
3	A H Elgamal (EGY)	21	21

Third round
J B Bongout (MRI)	8	17
7	K Mulenga (ZAM)	21	21
J E Emmy (NGR)	11	16
3	A H Elgamal (EGY)	21	21

Quarter-finals
7	K Mulenga (ZAM)	17	11
3	A H Elgamal (EGY)	21	21

==== Section 4 ====
First round
A Kiros (ERI)	14	25
A Owinyi (UGA)	21	27
K Ezzat (EGY)	14	8
R Summers (RSA)	21	21
M Tchagafou (TOG)	21	21
D N'Diaye (SEN)	12	11
K E Alphous (GHA)	21	21
S Obiegue (GEQ)	14	16
B Berdrin (CGO)	15	18
C M C Kpanou (BEN)	21	21

Second round
A Owinyi (UGA)	10	17
R Summers (RSA)	21	21
M Tchagafou (TOG)	9	10
5	A Hamek (ALG)	21	21
K E Alphous (GHA)	21	21
O Ouedraogo (BUR)	12	11
C M C Kpanou (BEN)	5	13
2	A J Opeyori (NGR)	21	21

Third round
R Summers (RSA)	21	12	12
5	A Hamek (ALG)	16	21	21
K E Alphous (GHA)	21	13
2	A J Opeyori (NGR)	23	21

Quarter-finals
5	Adel Hamek (ALG)	21	16	18
2	A J Opeyori (NGR)	19	21	21
