= Badminton at the 2023 African Games – Women's singles =

Women's singles at the 2023 African Games
- Venue: Borteyman Sports Complex
- Dates: 7–10 March 2024

Medalists
gold medal	Johanita Scholtz	South Africa
silver medal	Husina Kobugabe	Uganda
bronze medal	Dorcas Ajoke Adesokan	Nigeria
bronze medal	Fadilah Mohamed Rafi	Uganda

The badminton women's singles tournament at the 2023 African Games in Accra took place from 7 to 10 March 2024 at the Borteyman Sports Complex.

== Schedule ==
All times are Greenwich Mean Time (UTC±00:00)

Date	Time	Event
Thursday, 7 March 2024	09:00	Round of 64; Round of 32
Friday, 8 March 2024	09:00	Round of 16
Saturday, 9 March 2024	15:00	Quarter-finals
Sunday, 10 March 2024	09:00	Semi-finals
Sunday, 10 March 2024	15:00	Gold medal match

== Results ==
=== Seeds ===
1. Kate Ludik (MRI) (quarter-finals)
2. Fadilah Mohamed Rafi (UGA) (semi-finals)
3. Johanita Scholtz (RSA)
4. Nour Ahmed Youssri (EGY) (third round)
5. Doha Hany (EGY) (third round)
6. Husina Kobugabe (UGA)
7. Gladys Mbabazi (UGA) (quarter-finals)
8. Tracy Naluwooza (UGA) (quarter-finals)

=== Finals ===
Semi-finals
6	Husina Kobugabe (UGA)	21	21
Dorcas Ajoke Adesokan (NGR)	8	19
3	Johanita Scholtz (RSA)	21	21
2	Fadilah Mohamed Rafi (UGA)	15	10

Final
6	Husina Kobugabe (UGA)	21	17	19
3	Johanita Scholtz (RSA)	16	21	21

=== Top half ===
==== Section 1 ====
First round
Y Chibah (ALG)	21	21
I Kuassi-Kpede (TOG)	2	6

Second round
1	K Ludik (MRI)	21	21
R Eladawy (EGY)	6	18
U D Ukeh (NGR)	21	21
D Sebgo (BUR)	4	4
6	H Kobugabe (UGA)	21	21
M Kalandanya (ZAM)	4	9
P Nantuo (GHA)	12	16
Y Chibah (ALG)	21	21

Third round
1	K Ludik (MRI)	21	19	24
U D Ukeh (NGR)	11	21	22
6	H Kobugabe (UGA)	21	21
Y Chibah (ALG)	11	6

Quarter-finals
1	K Ludik (MRI)	21	17	14
6	H Kobugabe (UGA)	12	21	21

==== Section 2 ====
First round
D A Adesokan (NGR)	21	21
M A K Adu (GHA)	10	9
L Y Davordzi (GHA)	21	21	15
K Diallo (BUR)	11	23	21

Second round
4	N Ahmed Youssri (EGY)	21	21
D Olivier (RSA)	6	6
A Faye (SEN)	1	4
D A Adesokan (NGR)	21	21
8	T Naluwooza (UGA)	21	11	21
L Mazri (ALG)	15	21	14
F Kpogbemabou (BEN)	15	21	21
K Diallo (BUR)	21	17	18

Third round
4	N Ahmed Youssri (EGY)	10	21	19
D A Adesokan (NGR)	21	18	21
8	T Naluwooza (UGA)	21	21
F Kpogbemabou (BEN)	6	8

Quarter-finals
D A Adesokan (NGR)	16	21	21
8	T Naluwooza (UGA)	21	14	8

=== Bottom half ===
==== Section 3 ====
First round
H Bouksani (ALG)	21	21
K Dookhee (MRI)	16	10
L Belem (BUR)	11	22	11
B Loubaki (CGO)	21	20	21

Second round
H Bouksani (ALG)	16	21	21
Z D Alabi (NGR)	21	14	19
H Tarek (EGY)	18	13
7	G Mbabazi (UGA)	21	21
B Loubaki (CGO)	13	9
R Ofoli (GHA)	21	21
A G Akakpo (BEN)	2	6
3	J Scholtz (RSA)	21	21

Third round
H Bouksani (ALG)	10	20
7	G Mbabazi (UGA)	21	22
R Ofoli (GHA)	6	5
3	J Scholtz (RSA)	21	21

Quarter-finals
7	G Mbabazi (UGA)	13	11
3	J Scholtz (RSA)	21	21

==== Section 4 ====
First round
O Siamupangila (ZAM)	21	21
R Adjima (TOG)	8	10

Second round
O Siamupangila (ZAM)	8	6
S A Obanishola (NGR)	21	21
M Ouchefoun (ALG)	17	13
5	D Hany (EGY)	21	21
R Bilogo (BUR)	21	10	12
C Tornyenyor (GHA)	19	21	21
H O B Fabossou (BEN)	6	11
2	F Mohamed Rafi (UGA)	21	21

Third round
S A Obanishola (NGR)	21	21
5	D Hany (EGY)	15	16
C Tornyenyor (GHA)	12	10
2	F Mohamed Rafi (UGA)	21	21

Quarter-finals
S A Obanishola (NGR)	19	17
2	F Mohamed Rafi (UGA)	21	21
