= Badminton at the 2023 African Games – Mixed doubles =

Mixed doubles at the 2023 African Games
- Venue: Borteyman Sports Complex
- Dates: 8–10 March 2024

Medalists
gold medal	Koceila Mammeri; Tanina Mammeri	Algeria
silver medal	Adham Hatem Elgamal; Doha Hany	Egypt
bronze medal	Julien Paul; Kate Ludik	Mauritius
bronze medal	Caden Kakora; Johanita Scholtz	South Africa

The badminton mixed doubles tournament at the 2023 African Games in Accra took place from 8 to 10 March 2024 at the Borteyman Sports Complex.

== Schedule ==
All times are Greenwich Mean Time (UTC±00:00)

Date	Time	Event
Friday, 8 March 2024	09:00	Round of 32
Saturday, 9 March 2024	09:00	Round of 16
Saturday, 9 March 2024	15:00	Quarter-finals
Sunday, 10 March 2024	09:00	Semi-finals
Sunday, 10 March 2024	15:00	Gold medal match

== Results ==
=== Seeds ===
1. Koceila Mammeri / Tanina Mammeri (ALG) (champions)
2. Adham Hatem Elgamal / Doha Hany (EGY) (final)
3. Julien Paul / Kate Ludik (MRI) (semi-finals)
4. Caden Kakora / Johanita Scholtz (RSA) (semi-finals)
5. Robert Summers / Deidre Laurens (RSA) (quarter-finals)
6. Alhaji Aliyu Shehu / Zainab Damilola Alabi (NGR) (quarter-finals)
7. Jarred Elliott / Amy Ackerman (RSA) (quarter-finals)
8. Nusa Momoh / Ramatu Yakubu (NGR) (quarter-finals)

=== Finals ===
Semi-finals
1	Koceila Mammeri (ALG); Tanina Mammeri (ALG)	21	24	21
3	Julien Paul (MRI); Kate Ludik (MRI)	13	26	15
4	Caden Kakora (RSA); Johanita Scholtz (RSA)	19	16
2	Adham Hatem Elgamal (EGY); Doha Hany (EGY)	21	21

Final
1	Koceila Mammeri (ALG); Tanina Mammeri (ALG)	21	21
2	Adham Hatem Elgamal (EGY); Doha Hany (EGY)	11	15

=== Top half ===
==== Section 1 ====
First round
1	K Mammeri (ALG); T Mammeri (ALG)	21	21
C Mulenga (ZAM); M Kalandanya (ZAM)	7	10
M Ouedraogo (BUR); L Belem (BUR)	8	10
M Lubega (UGA); Husina Kobugabe (UGA)	21	21
6	A A Shehu (NGR); Z D Alabi (NGR)	21	21
E Korampong (GHA); M A K Adu (GHA)	13	19
D N'Diaye (SEN); A Faye (SEN)	8	2
K Ezzat (EGY); N Ahmed Youssri (EGY)	21	21

Second round
1	K Mammeri (ALG); T Mammeri (ALG)	21	21
M Lubega (UGA); Husina Kobugabe (UGA)	10	7
6	A A Shehu (NGR); Z D Alabi (NGR)	21	17	21
K Ezzat (EGY); N Ahmed Youssri (EGY)	17	21	16

Quarter-finals
1	K Mammeri (ALG); T Mammeri (ALG)	21	21
6	A A Shehu (NGR); Z D Alabi (NGR)	12	12

==== Section 2 ====
First round
3	J Paul (MRI); K Ludik (MRI)	21	21
C M C Kpanou (BEN); H O B Fabossou (BEN)	12	10
K Souleymann (TOG); R Adjima (TOG)	7	15
E Emuddu (UGA); T Naluwooza (UGA)	21	21
5	R Summers (RSA); D Laurens (RSA)	21	21
A F Tapsoba (BUR); R Bilogo (BUR)	4	9
A Salah (EGY); H Tarek (EGY)	21	21
L N A Addo (GHA); C Tornyenyor (GHA)	13	11

Second round
3	J Paul (MRI); K Ludik (MRI)	21	21
E Emuddu (UGA); T Naluwooza (UGA)	13	11
5	R Summers (RSA); D Laurens (RSA)	21	13	21
A Salah (EGY); H Tarek (EGY)	10	21	17

Quarter-finals
3	J Paul (MRI); K Ludik (MRI)	21	21
5	R Summers (RSA); D Laurens (RSA)	18	19

==== Section 3 ====
First round
A Owinyi (UGA); G Mbabazi (UGA)	21	20	21
O A Fano-Dosh (BEN); A Akakpo (BEN)	15	22	16
B Berdrin (CGO); S R Piffo (CGO)	9	10
8	N Momoh (NGR); R Yakubu (NGR)	21	21
M A Ouchefoun (ALG); M Ouchefoun (ALG)	21	21
K Mulenga (ZAM); O Siamupangila (ZAM)	19	18
K E Alphous (GHA); P Nantuo (GHA)	13	7
4	C Kakora (RSA); J Scholtz (RSA)	21	21

Second round
A Owinyi (UGA); G Mbabazi (UGA)	18	20
8	N Momoh (NGR); R Yakubu (NGR)	21	22
M A Ouchefoun (ALG); M Ouchefoun (ALG)	15	6
4	C Kakora (RSA); J Scholtz (RSA)	21	21

Quarter-finals
8	N Momoh (NGR); R Yakubu (NGR)	16	17
4	C Kakora (RSA); J Scholtz (RSA)	21	21

==== Section 4 ====
First round
A Issa (TOG); I Kuassi-Kpede (TOG)	25	7
F Kafando (BUR); K Diallo (BUR)	27	21
J B Bongout (MRI); K Dookhee (MRI)	19	15
7	J Elliott (RSA); A Ackerman (RSA)	21	21
A Tamakloe (GHA); R Ofoli (GHA)	9	16
S Larbaoui (ALG); D Naama (ALG)	21	21
C C Ahouangassi (BEN); F Kpogbemabou (BEN)	7	9
2	A H Elgamal (EGY); D Hany (EGY)	21	21

Second round
F Kafando (BUR); K Diallo (BUR)	7	10
7	J Elliott (RSA); A Ackerman (RSA)	21	21
S Larbaoui (ALG); D Naama (ALG)	12	11
2	A H Elgamal (EGY); D Hany (EGY)	21	21

Quarter-finals
7	J Elliott (RSA); A Ackerman (RSA)	21	17	19
2	A H Elgamal (EGY); D Hany (EGY)	10	21	21
