= Handball at the 2023 African Games =

- Date: 13–22 March 2024
- Competitors: TBD from 13 nations

Handball at the 2023 African Games was held in Accra, Ghana, from 13 to 22 March 2024. In this tournament, 8 teams participated in the men's competition and 8 teams too in the women's competition.

== Schedule ==
G	Group stage	½	Semifinals	C	Classification	B	Bronze medal match	F	Gold medal match

Date Event	Wed 13	Thu 14	Fri 15	Sat 16	Sun 17	Mon 18	Tue 19	Wed 20	Thu 21	Fri 22	
Men	G		G		G			½	C	B	F
Women		G		G		G		½	C	B	F

== Participating nations ==
NOC	Men	Women	Total athletes
Algeria		Yes	
Angola		Yes	
Benin	Yes		
Burkina Faso		Yes	
Cameroon		Yes	
Democratic Republic of the Congo	Yes	Yes	
Egypt	Yes		
Ghana	Yes	Yes	
Kenya	Yes		
Mali	Yes	Yes	
Nigeria	Yes		
Togo	Yes		
Uganda		Yes	
Total: 13 NOCs	8	8	

== Results ==
Event	Gold	Silver	Bronze
Men	Egypt	Democratic Republic of the Congo	Nigeria
Women	Angola	Democratic Republic of the Congo	Cameroon

== Medal table ==
* Host nation (Ghana)

Rank	Nation	Gold	Silver	Bronze	Total
1	Angola (ANG)	1	0	0	1
1	Egypt (EGY)	1	0	0	1
3	(Democratic Republic of the Congo) DR Congo (COD)	0	2	0	2
4	Cameroon (CMR)	0	0	1	1
4	Nigeria (NGR)	0	0	1	1
Totals (5 entries)		2	2	2	6
