= Field hockey at the 2023 African Games =

Field hockey at the 2023 Africa Games
- Venue: Theodosia Okoh Hockey Stadium
- Location: Accra, Ghana
- Dates: 15–22 March 2024
- Nations: 4

Champions
- Men: Egypt
- Women: Ghana

Field Hockey will be among the sports at the 13th African Games to held in 8 to 23 March 2023 in Accra, Ghana. The play will feature both a men's and women's tournament.

The hockey start date has been moved to 17 March due to the unreadiness of the Theodosia Okoh Hockey Stadium. South Africa has withdrawn both its field hockey teams from based on recommendations, guidelines as set down by the International Hockey Federation and the field is not satisfactory and may cause harm to the athletes.

== Schedule ==
In the preliminary round, games will be played on two pitches.

G	Group stage	B	Bronze medal match	F	Final

Event↓/Date →	Sun 17	Mon 18	Tue 19	Wed 20	Thu 21	Fri 22	
Men	G	G		G		B	F
Women	G	G		G		F	

== Participating nations ==
=== Men ===
4 teams were scheduled to compete in field hockey.

- Egypt
- Ghana
- Kenya
- Nigeria
- ~~South Africa~~

=== Women ===
3 teams were scheduled to compete in field hockey.

- Ghana
- Kenya
- Nigeria
- ~~South Africa~~

== Medal summary ==
=== Medal table ===
* Host nation (Ghana)

Rank	Nation	Gold	Silver	Bronze	Total
1	Ghana (GHA)*	1	1	0	2
2	Egypt (EGY)	1	0	0	1
3	Nigeria (NGR)	0	1	1	2
4	Kenya (KEN)	0	0	1	1
Totals (4 entries)		2	2	2	6

=== Events ===
Event	Gold	Silver	Bronze
Men	Egypt; Basel Abdelmonem; Mohamed Adel; Ziad Adel; Mohamed Ali; Karim Atef; Hussein Awad; Ahmed El-Naggar; Ahmed El-Ganaini; Mohamed Hemid; Mahmoud Hussin; Mahmoud Mamdouh; Mostafa Mansour; Ahmed Mohsen; Hossameldin Ragab; Mohamed Ragab; Ashraf Said; Amr Sayed; Moustafa Tarek	Ghana; Charles Abbiw; Malik Abdul; Eugene Acheampong; Benjamin Acquah; Abdellah Addison; Richard Adjei; Samuel Agbeli; Emmanuel Akaba; Emmanuel Ankomah; Stephen Asamoah; Luke Damalie; Matthew Damalie; Derrick Fialor; Benjamin Kwofie; Alfred Ntiamoah; Ernest Opoku; Joshua Pepperah; Francis Tettey	Nigeria; Christopher Joseph; Mustapha Abdullahi; Joseph Adamu; Olawale Ajibua; Muiz Bello; Sunday Godwin; Benjamin Ibrahim; Elkana Ibrahim; Olayinka Jayeoba; Michael John; Peter John; Kelvin Linus; Endurance Nzete; Isaac Patrick; James Samaila; Dennis Solomon; Kish Victor; Haruna Yohanna
Women	Ghana; Mercy Ackon; Juwaila Acquah; Lydia Afriyie; Adwoa Amoah; Cecilia Amoako; Mavis Ampem-Darkoa; Doris Antwi; Racheal Bamfo; Mavis Berko; Abigail Boye; Ernestina Coffie; Hagiet Copson; Regina Mensah; Vivian Narkuor; Elizabeth Opoku; Margaret Owusuwaa; Adizatu Sulemana; Nafisatu Umaru	Nigeria; Aisha Adamu; Morufat Adeyemi; Iveren Ajekwe; Esther Billo; Joy Christopher; Esther Chukwu; Mary Danboyi; Hannah Hossanah; Precious Irimiya; Aghalelosa Jerry; Alfa John; Benedicta Johnson; QueenEsther Njoku; Faith Obukowho; Damilola Ogunmakinju; Comfort Saturday; Martha Uko; Osarugue Umweni	Kenya; Quinter Okore; Beverlyne Akoth; Diana Bariti; Grace Bwire; Eleanor Chebet; Caroline Guchu; Naom Kemunto; Lynne Kipsang; Flavia Mutiva; Racheal Njogu; Gaudencia Ochieng; Nichole Odhiambo; Maurine Oduor; Maureen Okumu; Leah Omwandho; Vivian Onyango; Maurine Sumbwa; Alice Wanjiku

== Men's tournament ==
=== Group stage ===
Pos	Team	Pld	W	D	L	GF	GA	GD	Pts	Qualification
1	Egypt	3	3	0	0	9	6	+3	9	Final
2	Ghana (H)	3	2	0	1	4	2	+2	6	Final
3	Nigeria	3	1	0	2	6	7	−1	3	Third place match
4	Kenya	3	0	0	3	4	8	−4	0	Third place match

Source: FIH
Rules for classification: 1) points; 2) matches won; 3) goal difference; 4) goals for; 5) head-to-head result; 6) field goals scored.
(H) Hosts

== Women's tournament ==
=== Group stage ===
Pos	Team	Pld	W	D	L	GF	GA	GD	Pts	Qualification
1	Ghana (H)	2	2	0	0	5	1	+4	6	Final
2	Nigeria	2	1	0	1	1	1	0	3	Final
3	Kenya	2	0	0	2	1	5	−4	0	

Source: FIH
Rules for classification: 1) points; 2) matches won; 3) goal difference; 4) goals for; 5) head-to-head result; 6) field goals scored.
(H) Hosts
