= Nigeria at the 2023 African Games =

- Flag of Nigeria
- IOC code: NGR
- NOC: Nigeria Olympic Committee

in Accra, Ghana 8 March 2024 – 23 March 2024
- Competitors: 350 in 25 sports
- Medals Ranked 2nd: Gold 47 Silver 34 Bronze 40 Total 121

African Games appearances (overview)
- 1965; 1973; 1978; 1987; 1991; 1995; 1999; 2003; 2007; 2011; 2015; 2019; 2023

Nigeria competed at the 2023 African Games held from 8 to 23 March 2024 in Accra, Ghana. Nigeria competed in 25 sports.

== Medal table ==
| Medal | Name | Sport | Event | Date |
|---|---|---|---|---|
| Gold | Anuoluwapo Juwon Opeyori | Badminton | Men's singles | 10 March |
| Gold | Mercy Genesis | Wrestling | Women's freestyle 50 kg | 10 March |
| Gold | Christianah Ogunsanya | Wrestling | Women's freestyle 53 kg | 10 March |
| Gold | Odunayo Adekuoroye | Wrestling | Women's freestyle 57 kg | 10 March |
| Gold | Esther Kolawole | Wrestling | Women's freestyle 62 kg | 10 March |
| Gold | Blessing Oborududu | Wrestling | Women's freestyle 68 kg | 10 March |
| Gold | Hannah Rueben | Wrestling | Women's freestyle 76 kg | 10 March |
| Gold | Edidiong Umoafia | Weightlifting | Men's 67 kg total | 11 March |
| Gold | Edidiong Umoafia | Weightlifting | Men's 67 kg snatch | 11 March |
| Gold | Edidiong Umoafia | Weightlifting | Men's 67 kg clean & jerk | 11 March |
| Gold | Adijat Olarinoye | Weightlifting | Women's 55 kg total | 11 March |
| Gold | Adijat Olarinoye | Weightlifting | Women's 55 kg snatch | 11 March |
| Gold | Adijat Olarinoye | Weightlifting | Women's 55 kg clean & jerk | 11 March |
| Gold | Rafiatu Lawal | Weightlifting | Women's 59 kg total | 11 March |
| Gold | Rafiatu Lawal | Weightlifting | Women's 59 kg snatch | 11 March |
| Gold | Rafiatu Lawal | Weightlifting | Women's 59 kg clean & jerk | 11 March |
| Gold | Ruth Ayodele | Weightlifting | Women's 64 kg total | 12 March |
| Gold | Ruth Ayodele | Weightlifting | Women's 64 kg snatch | 12 March |
| Gold | Ruth Ayodele | Weightlifting | Women's 64 kg clean & jerk | 12 March |
| Gold | Joy Ogbonne Eze | Weightlifting | Women's 71 kg total | 12 March |
| Gold | Joy Ogbonne Eze | Weightlifting | Women's 71 kg snatch | 12 March |
| Gold | Joy Ogbonne Eze | Weightlifting | Women's 71 kg clean & jerk | 12 March |
| Gold | Mary Osijo | Weightlifting | Women's 87 kg clean & jerk | 14 March |
| Gold | Mausi Zannu | Arm wrestling | Women's left arm 55 kg | 15 March |
| Gold | Matthew Ovayioza | Arm wrestling | Women's left arm 70 kg | 15 March |
| Gold | Matthew Ovayioza | Arm wrestling | Women's right arm 70 kg | 16 March |
| Gold | Oyewusi Gloria | Arm wrestling | Women's right arm +80 kg | 16 March |
| Gold | Chukwuebuka Enekwechi | Athletics | Men's shot put | 19 March |
| Gold | Ruth Usoro | Athletics | Women's triple jump | 19 March |
| Gold | Patience Okon George; Ifeanyi Emmanuel Ojeli; Sikiru Adeyemi; Omolara Ogunmankinju; Samson Oghenewegba Nathaniel | Athletics | Mixed 4 × 400 metres relay | 19 March |
| Gold | Elizabeth Anyanacho | Taekwondo | Women's –67 kg | 19 March |
| Gold | Chidi Okezie | Athletics | Men's 400 metres | 20 March |
| Gold | Israel Sunday; Usheoritse Itsekiri; Emmanuel Consider; Alaba Akintola; Edose Ibadin | Athletics | Men's 4 × 100 metres relay | 20 March |
| Gold | Tobi Amusan | Athletics | Women's 100 metres hurdles | 20 March |
| Gold | Moforehan Abinusawa; Tobi Amusan; Justina Eyakpobeyan; Olayinka Olajide; Blessing Ogundiran; Chisom Onyebuchi | Athletics | Women's 4 × 100 metres relay | 20 March |
| Gold | Obiageri Amaechi | Athletics | Women's discus throw | 21 March |
| Gold | Ese Brume | Athletics | Women's long jump | 21 March |
| Gold | Nnamdi Chinecherem | Athletics | Men's javelin throw | 22 March |
| Gold | Patience Okon George; Brittany Ogunmokun; Omolara Ogunmankinju; Esther Joseph | Athletics | Women's 4 × 400 metres relay | 22 March |
| Gold | Dolapo Omole | Boxing | Men's –57 kg | 22 March |
| Gold | Olaitan Olaore | Boxing | Men's –92 kg | 22 March |
| Gold | Ifeanyi Onyekwere | Boxing | Men's +92 kg | 22 March |
| Gold | Nene Ojo | Boxing | Women's –57 kg | 22 March |
| Gold | Cynthia Ogunsemilore | Boxing | Women's –60 kg | 22 March |
| Gold | Blessing Oraekwe | Boxing | Women's –70 kg | 22 March |
| Gold | Patricia Mbata | Boxing | Women's –75 kg | 22 March |
| Gold | Jacinta Umunnakwe | Boxing | Women's –81 kg | 22 March |
| Silver | Quadri Aruna | Table tennis | Men's singles | 5 March |
| Silver | Quadri Aruna; Matthew Kuti; Taiwo Mati; Amadi Omeh; Olajide Omotayo | Table tennis | Men's team | 8 March |
| Silver | Sukurat Aiyelabegan; Fatimo Bello; Offiong Edem; Esther Oribamise; Hope Udoaka | Table tennis | Women's team | 8 March |
| Silver | Godwin Olofua | Badminton | Men's singles | 10 March |
| Silver | Godwin Olofua; Anuoluwapo Juwon Opeyori | Badminton | Men's doubles | 10 March |
| Silver | Favour Agboro | Weightlifting | Men's 61 kg total | 10 March |
| Silver | Favour Agboro | Weightlifting | Men's 61 kg clean & jerk | 10 March |
| Silver | Enozunimi Simeon | Wrestling | Men's freestyle 57 kg | 11 March |
| Silver | Stephen Izolo | Wrestling | Men's freestyle 65 kg | 11 March |
| Silver | Aston Mutuwa | Wrestling | Men's freestyle 125 kg | 11 March |
| Silver | Desmond Akano | Weightlifting | Men's 96 kg total | 13 March |
| Silver | Desmond Akano | Weightlifting | Men's 96 kg clean & jerk | 13 March |
| Silver | Abayomi Adeyemi | Weightlifting | Men's 102 kg clean & jerk | 13 March |
| Silver | Lucky Joseph | Weightlifting | Men's +109 kg total | 14 March |
| Silver | Lucky Joseph | Weightlifting | Men's +109 kg snatch | 14 March |
| Silver | Lucky Joseph | Weightlifting | Men's +109 kg clean & jerk | 14 March |
| Silver | Mary Osijo | Weightlifting | Women's 87 kg total | 14 March |
| Silver | Mary Osijo | Weightlifting | Women's 87 kg snatch | 14 March |
| Silver | Ese Ukpeseraye | Cycling | Women's individual time trial elite | 15 March |
| Silver | Blessing Ogungbure | Arm wrestling | Women's right arm 70 kg | 16 March |
| Silver | Winifred Eze Ndidi | Arm wrestling | Women's right arm 80 kg | 16 March |
| Silver | Usheoritse Itsekiri | Athletics | Men's 100 metres | 19 March |
| Silver | Esther Joseph | Athletics | Women's 400 metres | 20 March |
| Silver | Chioma Onyekwere | Athletics | Women's discus throw | 21 March |
| Silver | Kemi Francis-Petersen | Athletics | Women's heptathlon | 21 March |
| Silver | Nigeria | Football | Women's tournament | 21 March |
| Silver | Olayinka Olajide | Athletics | Women's 200 metres | 22 March |
| Silver | Oyesade Olatoye | Athletics | Women's shot put | 22 March |
| Silver | Cynthia Gbihi; Isioma Onianwa; Regina Donanu; Ternadoo Agba | 3x3 basketball | Women's U23 | 22 March |
| Silver | Zainab Adeshina | Boxing | Women's –50 kg | 22 March |
| Silver | Shukura Kareem | Boxing | Women's –54 kg | 22 March |
| Silver | Nigeria | Field hockey | Women's tournament | 22 March |
| Silver | Josephine Esuku | Taekwondo | Women's under 40 | 22 March |
| Silver | Aanu Ayegbusi; Adesuwa Osabuohien; Oyinlomo Quadre; Divine Nweke; Marylove Edwards; Khadijat Eleojo; Sarah Adegoke | Tennis | Women's team | 23 March |
| Bronze | Offiong Edem | Table tennis | Women's singles | 5 March |
| Bronze | Ese Ukpeseraye | Cycling | Women's road race | 9 March |
| Bronze | Emmanuel Nworie | Wrestling | Men's Greco-Roman 77 kg | 9 March |
| Bronze | Victor Ikechukwu | Badminton | Men's singles | 10 March |
| Bronze | Dorcas Ajoke Adesokan | Badminton | Women's singles | 10 March |
| Bronze | Dorcas Ajoke Adesokan; Sofiat Arinola Obanishola | Badminton | Women's doubles | 10 March |
| Bronze | Matthew Kuti; Taiwo Mati | Table tennis | Men's doubles | 10 March |
| Bronze | Fatimo Bello; Offiong Edem | Table tennis | Women's doubles | 10 March |
| Bronze | Favour Agboro | Weightlifting | Men's 61 kg snatch | 10 March |
| Bronze | King Kalu | Weightlifting | Men's 55 kg total | 10 March |
| Bronze | King Kalu | Weightlifting | Men's 55 kg clean & jerk | 10 March |
| Bronze | Peace Samson | Chess | Women's blitz individual | 11 March |
| Bronze | Peace Samson; Bomo Kigigha | Chess | Mixed blitz team | 11 March |
| Bronze | Harrison Onovwiomogbohwo | Wrestling | Men's freestyle 86 kg | 11 March |
| Bronze | Franca Audu | Judo | Women's −52 kg | 12 March |
| Bronze | Colins Obi Ebingha; Clinton Opute; Abdul Jabar Adama; Tobi Sijuade | Swimming | Men's 4 × 100 metre freestyle relay | 12 March |
| Bronze | Nigeria | Cricket | Women's tournament | 13 March |
| Bronze | Desmond Akano | Weightlifting | Men's 96 kg snatch | 13 March |
| Bronze | Abayomi Adeyemi | Weightlifting | Men's 102 kg total | 13 March |
| Bronze | Abayomi Adeyemi | Weightlifting | Men's 102 kg snatch | 13 March |
| Bronze | Pamela Bawa; Esther Mbah | Beach volleyball | Women's tournament | 14 March |
| Bronze | Yinusa Idowu | Arm wrestling | Men's left arm 65 kg | 15 March |
| Bronze | Samuel Nmeka | Arm wrestling | Men's left arm 85 kg | 15 March |
| Bronze | Blessing Ogungbure | Arm wrestling | Women's left arm 70 kg | 15 March |
| Bronze | Winifred Eze Ndidi | Arm wrestling | Women's left arm 80 kg | 15 March |
| Bronze | Yinusa Idowu | Arm wrestling | Men's right arm 65 kg | 16 March |
| Bronze | Samuel Nmeka | Arm wrestling | Men's right arm 85 kg | 16 March |
| Bronze | Blessing Chika | Arm wrestling | Women's right arm 55 kg | 16 March |
| Bronze | Chinazum Nwosu | Taekwondo | Women's –53 kg | 17 March |
| Bronze | Olayinka Olajide | Athletics | Women's 100 metres | 19 March |
| Bronze | Oyesade Olatoye | Athletics | Women's hammer throw | 19 March |
| Bronze | Prestina Ochonogor | Athletics | Women's long jump | 21 March |
| Bronze | Elizabeth Anyanacho; Ifeoluwa Ajayi; Peter Itiku; Paul Kolade; Chinazum Nwosu; Chidimma Okoko | Taekwondo | Mixed team kyorugi | 21 March |
| Bronze | Divine Nweke; Oyinlomo Quadre | Tennis | Women's doubles | 21 March |
| Bronze | Emmanuel Consider | Athletics | Men's 200 metres | 22 March |
| Bronze | Ifeanyi Emmanuel Ojeli; Sikiru Adeyemi; Samson Oghenewegba Nathaniel; Chidi Okezie; Dubem Nwachukwu | Athletics | Men's 4 × 400 metres relay | 22 March |
| Bronze | Nigeria | Handball | Men's tournament | 22 March |
| Bronze | Nigeria | Field hockey | Men's tournament | 22 March |
| Bronze | Usman Harun | Taekwondo | Men's under 30 | 22 March |
| Bronze | Josephine Esuku | Taekwondo | Women's over 17 | 22 March |

== Cricket ==
=== Men's ===
Group play

| Pos | Team | Pld | W | L | T | NR | Pts | NRR | Qualification |
|---|---|---|---|---|---|---|---|---|---|
| 1 | Zimbabwe Emerging | 3 | 3 | 0 | 0 | 0 | 6 | 1.600 | Advanced to knockout stage |
| 2 | Namibia | 3 | 1 | 2 | 0 | 0 | 2 | 0.195 | Advanced to knockout stage |
| 3 | Tanzania | 3 | 1 | 2 | 0 | 0 | 2 | −0.220 | |
| 4 | Nigeria | 3 | 1 | 2 | 0 | 0 | 2 | −1.158 | |

Source: ESPNcricinfo

17 March 2024
09:30
Scorecard

| Zimbabwe Emerging; 197/6 (20 overs) | v | Namibia; 162/8 (20 overs) |
| Brian Bennett 65 (39); Jan Nicol Loftie-Eaton 2/27 (4 overs) | | Malan Kruger 46 (23); Tashinga Musekiwa 3/29 (4 overs) |

Zimbabwe Emerging won by 35 runs
Achimota Oval A, Accra
Umpires: Stacy Lackay (SA) and Isaac Oyieko (Ken)
Player of the match: Owen Muzondo (Zim)

- Zimbabwe Emerging won the toss and elected to bat.

18 March 2024
09:30
Scorecard

| Tanzania; 86 (19.5 overs) | v | Zimbabwe Emerging; 90/6 (16.3 overs) |
| Omary Kitunda 43 (40); Wallace Mubayiwa 3/12 (4 overs) | | Clive Madande 42* (39); Ally Kimote 2/12 (3 overs) |

Zimbabwe Emerging won by 4 wickets
Achimota Oval A, Accra
Umpires: Habib Enesi (Nga) and Stacy Lackay (SA)
Player of the match: Wallace Mubayiwa (Zim)

- Tanzania won the toss and elected to bat.

20 March 2024
13:50
Scorecard

| Nigeria; 88 (17.4 overs) | v | Zimbabwe Emerging; 91/0 (16 overs) |
| Vincent Adewoye 19* (15); Owen Muzondo 3/11 (4 overs) | | Tadiwanashe Marumani 47* (44) |

Zimbabwe Emerging won by 10 wickets
Achimota Oval A, Accra
Umpires: Patric Makumbi (Uga) and Isaac Oyieko (Ken)
Player of the match: Owen Muzondo (Zim)

- Nigeria won the toss and elected to bat.

=== Women's ===
Group play

| Pos | Team | Pld | W | L | T | NR | Pts | NRR | Qualification |
|---|---|---|---|---|---|---|---|---|---|
| 1 | South Africa Emerging | 3 | 2 | 1 | 0 | 0 | 4 | 1.887 | Advanced to the knockout stage |
| 2 | Nigeria | 3 | 1 | 1 | 0 | 1 | 3 | 0.778 | Advanced to the knockout stage |
| 3 | Tanzania | 3 | 1 | 1 | 0 | 1 | 3 | −1.130 | |
| 4 | Namibia | 3 | 1 | 2 | 0 | 0 | 2 | −1.421 | |

Source: ESPNcricinfo

7 March 2024
09:30
Scorecard

| Tanzania; 58/3 (10 overs) | v | Nigeria |
| Hudaa Omary 18* (26); Usen Peace 1/3 (2 overs) |

No result
Achimota Oval B, Accra
Umpires: Patric Makumbi (Uga) and Sarah Dambanevana (Zim)

- Tanzania won the toss and elected to bat.
- No further play was possible due to rain.
- Usen Peace (Nga) made her T20I debut.

8 March 2024
09:30
Scorecard

| Nigeria; 111/6 (20 overs) | v | Namibia; 56 (18.4 overs) |
| Salome Sunday 40 (36); Kayleen Green 2/19 (4 overs) | | Yasmeen Khan 17 (19); Usen Peace 3/5 (4 overs) |

Nigeria won by 55 runs
Achimota Oval B, Accra
Umpires: Sarah Dambanevana (Zim) and Stacy Lackay (SA)
Player of the match: Usen Peace (Nga)

- Nigeria won the toss and elected to bat.

10 March 2024
09:30
Scorecard

| Nigeria; 74 (18.4 overs) | v | South Africa Emerging; 78/6 (14.5 overs) |
| Favour Eseigbe 17 (28); Seshnie Naidu 4/13 (4 overs) | | Faye Tunnicliffe 45 (34); Lillian Udeh 5/18 (4 overs) |

South Africa Emerging won by 4 wickets
Achimota Oval B, Accra
Umpires: Isaac Oyieko (Ken) and Percival Sizara (Zim)
Player of the match: Seshnie Naidu (SA)

- Nigeria won the toss and elected to bat.

Semi-finals

11 March 2024
13:50
Scorecard

| Nigeria; 74/9 (20 overs) | v | Zimbabwe; 75/5 (16 overs) |
| Lucky Piety 13 (14); Kelis Ndhlovu 3/12 (4 overs) | | Modester Mupachikwa 26 (43); Peculiar Agboya 2/12 (4 overs) |

Zimbabwe won by 5 wickets
Achimota Oval A, Accra
Umpires: Stacy Lackay (SA) and Isaac Oyieko (Ken)
Player of the match: Kelis Ndhlovu (Zim)

- Nigeria won the toss and elected to bat.

Bronze medal match

13 March 2024
09:30
Scorecard

| Uganda; 76/8 (20 overs) | v | Nigeria; 78/7 (19.2 overs) |
| Immaculate Nakisuuyi 21 (43); Peculiar Agboya 3/11 (4 overs) | | Salome Sunday 37 (50); Janet Mbabazi 2/8 (4 overs) |

Nigeria won by 3 wickets
Achimota Oval A, Accra
Umpires: Sarah Dambanevana (Zim) and Stacy Lackay (SA)
Player of the match: Salome Sunday (Nga)

- Nigeria won the toss and elected to field.
- Concy Aweko (Uga) took her 100th wicket in T20Is.

== Field Hockey ==
Summary

Key:

- FT – After full-time.
- P – Match decided by penalty-shootout.

| Team | Event | Group stage | | | | Final / BM | |
| Team | Event | Opposition Score | Opposition Score | Opposition Score | Rank | Opposition Score | Rank |
|---|---|---|---|---|---|---|---|
| Nigeria men's | Men's tournament | Ghana; L 0–1 | Egypt; L 4–5 | Kenya; W 2–1 | 3 | Kenya; W 2–1 | 3 |
| Nigeria women's | Women's tournament | Ghana; L 1–0 | bye | Kenya; W 1–0 | 2 | L 0–0 (4–3 s.o.) | 2 |

=== Men's ===
Team roster

The squad was announced on 12 March 2024.

Head coach: Baba Ndana

1. Haruna Yohanna (GK)
3. Christopher Joseph
4. Olawale Ajibua
5. Joseph Adamu
6. James Samaila
7. Kish Victor
8. Michael John (C)
9. Sunday Godwin
10. Muiz Bello
11. Kelvin Linus
12. Peter John
13. Dennis Solomon
14. Elkana Ibrahim
15. Olayinka Jayeoba
16. Endurance Nzete
17. Isaac Patrick
19. Benjamin Ibrahim
22. Mustapha Abdullahi (GK)

Group play

| Pos | Team | Pld | W | D | L | GF | GA | GD | Pts | Qualification |
|---|---|---|---|---|---|---|---|---|---|---|
| 1 | Egypt | 3 | 3 | 0 | 0 | 9 | 6 | +3 | 9 | Final |
| 2 | Ghana (H) | 3 | 2 | 0 | 1 | 4 | 2 | +2 | 6 | Final |
| 3 | Nigeria | 3 | 1 | 0 | 2 | 6 | 7 | −1 | 3 | Third place match |
| 4 | Kenya | 3 | 0 | 0 | 3 | 4 | 8 | −4 | 0 | Third place match |

Source: FIH
Rules for classification: 1) points; 2) matches won; 3) goal difference; 4) goals for; 5) head-to-head result; 6) field goals scored.
(H) Hosts

17 March 2024
14:00

| Ghana | 1–0 | Nigeria |
|---|---|---|
| Damalie 58' | Report |

Umpires:
Deepak Joshi (IND)
Haroon Rashid (PAK)

18 March 2024
10:00

| Egypt | 5–4 | Nigeria |
|---|---|---|
| El-Ganaini 17', 36'; Ragab 29'; Sayed 32'; Mamdouh 51' | Report | Samaila 21', 30'; Victor 32', 49' |

Umpires:
Deepak Joshi (IND)
Nortey Ebenezer (GHA)

20 March 2024
14:00

| Nigeria | 2–1 | Kenya |
|---|---|---|
| Samaila 15', 21' | Report | Masambu 7' |

Umpires:
Nortey Ebenezer (GHA)
Mohamed Hassan (EGY)

Third and fourth place

22 March 2024
14:00

| Nigeria | 2–1 | Kenya |
|---|---|---|
| Samaila 33'; John 43' | Report | Kariuki 53' |

Umpires:
Mohamed Hassan (EGY)
Nortey Ebenezer (GHA)

=== Women's ===
Team roster

The squad was announced on 12 March 2024.

Head coach: Baba Ndana

1. Martha Uko (GK)
2. Alfa John (C)
3. Hannah Hossanah
4. Iveren Ajekwe
5. Morufat Adeyemi
6. Joy Christopher
7. Faith Obukowho
8. Precious Irimiya
9. QueenEsther Njoku
10. Comfort Saturday
11. Esther Chukwu
12. Aghalelosa Jerry
13. Benedicta Johnson
14. Mary Danboyi
15. Damilola Ogunmakinju
16. Esther Billo
17. Osarugue Umweni
18. Aisha Adamu (GK)

Group play

| Pos | Team | Pld | W | D | L | GF | GA | GD | Pts | Qualification |
|---|---|---|---|---|---|---|---|---|---|---|
| 1 | Ghana (H) | 2 | 2 | 0 | 0 | 5 | 1 | +4 | 6 | Final |
| 2 | Nigeria | 2 | 1 | 0 | 1 | 1 | 1 | 0 | 3 | Final |
| 3 | Kenya | 2 | 0 | 0 | 2 | 1 | 5 | −4 | 0 | |

Source: FIH
Rules for classification: 1) points; 2) matches won; 3) goal difference; 4) goals for; 5) head-to-head result; 6) field goals scored.
(H) Hosts

18 March 2024
14:00

| Nigeria | 0–1 | Ghana |
|---|---|---|
| | Report | Berko 19' |

Umpires:
Kamile Mockaitytė (LTU)
Haroon Rashid (PAK)

20 March 2024
10:00

| Nigeria | 1–0 | Kenya |
|---|---|---|
| Njoku 60' | Report |

Umpires:
Kamile Mockaitytė (LTU)
Evelyn Fiador (GHA)

Final

22 March 2024
13:30

| Ghana | 0–0 | Nigeria |
|---|---|---|
| | Report |
Penalties
| Opoku (penalty shoot-out scored); Umaru (penalty shoot-out scored); Amoako (penalty shoot-out scored); Bamfo (penalty shoot-out missed); Owusuwaa (penalty shoot-out missed); Umaru (penalty shoot-out missed); Opoku (penalty shoot-out missed); Amoako (penalty shoot-out scored) | 4–3 | (penalty shoot-out scored) Johnson; (penalty shoot-out missed) Jerry; (penalty shoot-out scored) Christopher; (penalty shoot-out scored) Saturday; (penalty shoot-out missed) Billo; (penalty shoot-out missed) Christopher; (penalty shoot-out missed) Johnson; (penalty shoot-out missed) Jerry |

Umpires:
Kamile Mockaitytė (LTU)
Haroon Rashid (PAK)
