= Badminton at the 2023 African Games =

- Venue: Borteyman Sports Complex-Badminton Arena
- Location: Accra, Ghana
- Dates: 7–10 March

Badminton events at the 2023 African Games occurred between 7 and 10 March at the Borteyman Sports Complex in Accra, Ghana. The badminton program in 2023 included men's and women's singles competitions; men's, women's and mixed doubles competitions alongside a mixed team event throughout the six days of competition. The tournament served as a qualifier for the 2024 Summer Olympics in Paris, France.

Due to undisclosed reasons, the mixed team event which was supposed to be held from 4 to 7 March was cancelled. Therefore, only the individual events were held. The President of Ghana Badminton Federation Yeboah Evans played a key role in saving the continental games and exhibited an international event management in the Olympic qualifying event.

== Schedule ==
P	Preliminary rounds	¼	Quarterfinals	½	Semifinals	F	Final

Event↓/Date →	7th Thu	8th Fri		9th Sat		10th Sun	
Men's singles	P	P	P	P	¼	½	F
Men's doubles		P	P	P	¼	½	F
Women's singles	P	P	P	P	¼	½	F
Women's doubles		P	P	P	¼	½	F
Mixed doubles		P	P	P	¼	½	F

== Medal summary ==
The table below gives an overview of the medal table and result of badminton at the 2023 African Games:

=== Medal table ===
Rank	Nation	Gold	Silver	Bronze	Total
1	Algeria (ALG)	2	1	0	3
2	Nigeria (NGR)	1	2	3	6
3	Uganda (UGA)	1	1	1	3
4	South Africa (RSA)	1	0	2	3
5	Egypt (EGY)	0	1	3	4
6	Mauritius (MRI)	0	0	1	1
Totals (6 entries)		5	5	10	20

=== Medalists ===
Event	Gold	Silver	Bronze
Men's singles	Anuoluwapo Juwon Opeyori; Nigeria	Godwin Olofua; Nigeria	Victor Ikechukwu; Nigeria
Men's singles	Anuoluwapo Juwon Opeyori; Nigeria	Godwin Olofua; Nigeria	Adham Hatem Elgamal; Egypt
Women's singles	Johanita Scholtz; South Africa	Husina Kobugabe; Uganda	Dorcas Ajoke Adesokan; Nigeria
Women's singles	Johanita Scholtz; South Africa	Husina Kobugabe; Uganda	Fadilah Mohamed Rafi; Uganda
Men's doubles	Algeria; Koceila Mammeri; Youcef Sabri Medel	Nigeria; Godwin Olofua; Anuoluwapo Juwon Opeyori	Egypt; Adham Hatem Elgamal; Ahmed Salah
Men's doubles	Algeria; Koceila Mammeri; Youcef Sabri Medel	Nigeria; Godwin Olofua; Anuoluwapo Juwon Opeyori	South Africa; Jarred Elliott; Robert Summers
Women's doubles	Uganda; Husina Kobugabe; Gladys Mbabazi	Algeria; Halla Bouksani; Tanina Mammeri	Nigeria; Dorcas Ajoke Adesokan; Sofiat Arinola Obanishola
Women's doubles	Uganda; Husina Kobugabe; Gladys Mbabazi	Algeria; Halla Bouksani; Tanina Mammeri	Egypt; Nour Ahmed Youssri; Doha Hany
Mixed doubles	Algeria; Koceila Mammeri; Tanina Mammeri	Egypt; Adham Hatem Elgamal; Doha Hany	Mauritius; Julien Paul; Kate Ludik
Mixed doubles	Algeria; Koceila Mammeri; Tanina Mammeri	Egypt; Adham Hatem Elgamal; Doha Hany	South Africa; Caden Kakora; Johanita Scholtz
