= Weightlifting at the 2023 African Games =

- Venue: University of Ghana Sports Facilities
- Location: Accra, Ghana
- Dates: 10–14 March 2024

Weightlifting at the 2023 African Games was held from 10 to 14 March 2024 at the University of Ghana Sports Facilities in Accra, Ghana.

== Results ==
=== Men ===
Event	Gold		Silver		Bronze	
55 kg
Snatch	Éric Andriantsitohaina; Madagascar	96 kg	Wilhem Emilie; Mauritius	91 kg	Davis Niyoyita; Uganda	90 kg
Clean & Jerk	Éric Andriantsitohaina; Madagascar	135 kg	Davis Niyoyita; Uganda	120 kg	King Kalu; Nigeria	115 kg
Total	Éric Andriantsitohaina; Madagascar	231 kg	Davis Niyoyita; Uganda	210 kg	King Kalu; Nigeria	204 kg
61 kg
Snatch	Aly Elsayed; Egypt	117 kg	Mohamed Bouhejba; Tunisia	114 kg	Favour Agboro; Nigeria	113 kg
Clean & Jerk	Aly Elsayed; Egypt	150 kg	Favour Agboro; Nigeria	140 kg	Mohamed Bouhejba; Tunisia	136 kg
Total	Aly Elsayed; Egypt	267 kg	Favour Agboro; Nigeria	253 kg	Mohamed Bouhejba; Tunisia	250 kg
67 kg
Snatch	Edidiong Umoafia; Nigeria	135 kg	Ayoub Salem; Tunisia	129 kg	Akram Chekhchoukh; Algeria	128 kg
Clean & Jerk	Edidiong Umoafia; Nigeria	165 kg	Akram Chekhchoukh; Algeria	151 kg	Ayoub Salem; Tunisia	146 kg
Total	Edidiong Umoafia; Nigeria	300 kg	Akram Chekhchoukh; Algeria	279 kg	Ayoub Salem; Tunisia	275 kg
73 kg
Snatch	Samir Fardjallah; Algeria	138 kg	Ahsaan Shabi; Libya	137 kg	Jon-Antohein Phillips; South Africa	122 kg
Clean & Jerk	Samir Fardjallah; Algeria	166 kg	Ahsaan Shabi; Libya	165 kg	Jon-Antohein Phillips; South Africa	153 kg
Total	Samir Fardjallah; Algeria	304 kg	Ahsaan Shabi; Libya	302 kg	Jon-Antohein Phillips; South Africa	275 kg
81 kg
Snatch	Mohammed Alzintani; Libya	141 kg	Hamza Ben Amor; Tunisia	140 kg	Jeremie Ngouanom Nzali; Cameroon	137 kg
Clean & Jerk	Hamza Ben Amor; Tunisia	176 kg	Mohammed Alzintani; Libya	174 kg	Jeremie Ngouanom Nzali; Cameroon	165 kg
Total	Hamza Ben Amor; Tunisia	316 kg	Mohammed Alzintani; Libya	315 kg	Jeremie Ngouanom Nzali; Cameroon	302 kg
89 kg
Snatch	Eslam Abouelwafa; Egypt	153 kg	Omar Alajeemi; Libya	141 kg	Slim Bichini; Tunisia	140 kg
Clean & Jerk	Eslam Abouelwafa; Egypt	190 kg	Omar Alajeemi; Libya	176 kg	William Swart; South Africa	169 kg
Total	Eslam Abouelwafa; Egypt	343 kg	Omar Alajeemi; Libya	317 kg	Mohamed Messaour; Algeria	303 kg
96 kg
Snatch	Karim Abokahla; Egypt	151 kg	Faris Touairi; Algeria	150 kg	Desmond Akano; Nigeria	145 kg
Clean & Jerk	Karim Abokahla; Egypt	192 kg	Desmond Akano; Nigeria	191 kg	Faris Touairi; Algeria	180 kg
Total	Karim Abokahla; Egypt	343 kg	Desmond Akano; Nigeria	336 kg	Faris Touairi; Algeria	330 kg
102 kg
Snatch	Ahmed Sayed; Egypt	155 kg	Ahmed Abuzriba; Libya	153 kg	Abayomi Adeyemi; Nigeria	151 kg
Clean & Jerk	Ahmed Sayed; Egypt	196 kg	Abayomi Adeyemi; Nigeria	190 kg	Ahmed Abuzriba; Libya	189 kg
Total	Ahmed Sayed; Egypt	351 kg	Ahmed Abuzriba; Libya	342 kg	Abayomi Adeyemi; Nigeria	341 kg
109 kg
Snatch	Ragab Abdelhay; Egypt	163 kg	Ngadja Junior; Cameroon	152 kg	Khelwin Juboo; Mauritius	141 kg
Clean & Jerk	Ngadja Junior; Cameroon	205 kg	Ragab Abdelhay; Egypt	193 kg	Khelwin Juboo; Mauritius	188 kg
Total	Ngadja Junior; Cameroon	357 kg	Ragab Abdelhay; Egypt	356 kg	Khelwin Juboo; Mauritius	329 kg
+109 kg
Snatch	Abdelrahman El-Sayed; Egypt	155 kg	Lucky Joseph; Nigeria	152 kg	Ezzeddine Maik; Tunisia	151 kg
Clean & Jerk	Abdelrahman El-Sayed; Egypt	195 kg	Lucky Joseph; Nigeria	190 kg	Ezzeddine Maik; Tunisia	170 kg
Total	Abdelrahman El-Sayed; Egypt	350 kg	Lucky Joseph; Nigeria	342 kg	Ezzeddine Maik; Tunisia	321 kg

=== Women ===
Event	Gold		Silver		Bronze	
45 kg
Snatch	Basma Ramadan; Egypt	56 kg	Nadia Katbi; Algeria	55 kg	Esther Kavesa; Kenya	50 kg
Clean & Jerk	Basma Ramadan; Egypt	71 kg	Nadia Katbi; Algeria	68 kg	Tiavina Andriamintatsoa; Madagascar	67 kg
Total	Basma Ramadan; Egypt	127 kg	Nadia Katbi; Algeria	123 kg	Esther Kavesa; Kenya	115 kg
49 kg
Snatch	Pasnin Sheridane; Mauritius	64 kg	Winnifred Ntumi; Ghana	63 kg	Ny Hasina Andriamitantsoa; Madagascar	60 kg
Clean & Jerk	Tasnim Ben Wedda; Tunisia	81 kg	Winnifred Ntumi; Ghana	81 kg	Ny Hasina Andriamitantsoa; Madagascar	80 kg
Total	Winnifred Ntumi; Ghana	144 kg	Ny Hasina Andriamitantsoa; Madagascar	140 kg	Tasnim Ben Wedda; Tunisia	140 kg
55 kg
Snatch	Adijat Olarinoye; Nigeria	80 kg	Noura Essam; Egypt	79 kg	Eya Aouadi; Tunisia	78 kg
Clean & Jerk	Adijat Olarinoye; Nigeria	105 kg	Eya Aouadi; Tunisia	95 kg	Noura Essam; Egypt	93 kg
Total	Adijat Olarinoye; Nigeria	185 kg	Eya Aouadi; Tunisia	173 kg	Noura Essam; Egypt	172 kg
59 kg
Snatch	Rafiatu Lawal; Nigeria	85 kg	Anneke Spies; South Africa	84 kg	Isra Bejaoui; Tunisia	75 kg
Clean & Jerk	Rafiatu Lawal; Nigeria	105 kg	Anneke Spies; South Africa	101 kg	Isra Bejaoui; Tunisia	92 kg
Total	Rafiatu Lawal; Nigeria	190 kg	Anneke Spies; South Africa	185 kg	Isra Bejaoui; Tunisia	167 kg
64 kg
Snatch	Ruth Ayodele; Nigeria	94 kg	Chaima Rahmouni; Tunisia	92 kg	Seforah Lent; Mauritius	80 kg
Clean & Jerk	Ruth Ayodele; Nigeria	114 kg	Chaima Rahmouni; Tunisia	111 kg	Ikram Cherara; Algeria	100 kg
Total	Ruth Ayodele; Nigeria	208 kg	Chaima Rahmouni; Tunisia	203 kg	Ikram Cherara; Algeria	178 kg
71 kg
Snatch	Joy Ogbonne Eze; Nigeria	90 kg	Jawaher Guesmi; Tunisia	87 kg	Laryne Jefferies; South Africa	86 kg
Clean & Jerk	Joy Ogbonne Eze; Nigeria	117 kg	Jawaher Guesmi; Tunisia	116 kg	Laryne Jefferies; South Africa	107 kg
Total	Joy Ogbonne Eze; Nigeria	207 kg	Jawaher Guesmi; Tunisia	203 kg	Laryne Jefferies; South Africa	193 kg
76 kg
Snatch	Ketty Lent; Mauritius	91 kg	Amira Mohamed; Egypt	83 kg	Nihad Belounis; Algeria	82 kg
Clean & Jerk	Ketty Lent; Mauritius	106 kg	Nihad Belounis; Algeria	105 kg	Amira Mohamed; Egypt	103 kg
Total	Ketty Lent; Mauritius	197 kg	Nihad Belounis; Algeria	187 kg	Amira Mohamed; Egypt	186 kg
81 kg
Snatch	Sara Ahmed; Egypt	100 kg	Jeanne Eyenga; Cameroon	89 kg	Juliana Ongonga; Kenya	73 kg
Clean & Jerk	Sara Ahmed; Egypt	140 kg	Jeanne Eyenga; Cameroon	120 kg	Juliana Ongonga; Kenya	92 kg
Total	Sara Ahmed; Egypt	240 kg	Jeanne Eyenga; Cameroon	209 kg	Juliana Ongonga; Kenya	165 kg
87 kg
Snatch	Fatma Mahmoud; Egypt	104 kg	Mary Osijo; Nigeria	103 kg	Zeineb Naoui; Tunisia	84 kg
Clean & Jerk	Mary Osijo; Nigeria	128 kg	Fatma Mahmoud; Egypt	127 kg	Zeineb Naoui; Tunisia	90 kg
Total	Fatma Mahmoud; Egypt	231 kg	Mary Osijo; Nigeria	231 kg	Zeineb Naoui; Tunisia	174 kg
+87 kg
Snatch	Shimaa Khaled; Egypt	107 kg	Amina Yahia; Algeria	87 kg	Estelle Momeni; Cameroon	86 kg
Clean & Jerk	Shimaa Khaled; Egypt	130 kg	Estelle Momeni; Cameroon	108 kg	Amina Yahia; Algeria	106 kg
Total	Shimaa Khaled; Egypt	237 kg	Estelle Momeni; Cameroon	194 kg	Amina Yahia; Algeria	193 kg

== Medal table ==
* Host nation (Ghana)

Rank	Nation	Gold	Silver	Bronze	Total
1	Egypt (EGY)	27	5	4	36
2	Nigeria (NGR)	16	10	6	32
3	Mauritius (MRI)	4	1	4	9
4	Tunisia (TUN)	3	11	16	30
5	Algeria (ALG)	3	9	9	21
6	Madagascar (MAD)	3	1	3	7
7	Cameroon (CMR)	2	6	4	12
8	Libya (LBA)	1	10	1	12
9	Ghana (GHA)*	1	2	0	3
10	South Africa (RSA)	0	3	7	10
11	Uganda (UGA)	0	2	1	3
12	Kenya (KEN)	0	0	5	5
Totals (12 entries)		60	60	60	180
