= Arm wrestling at the 2023 African Games =

- Venue: CEDI Conference Centre
- Dates: 15–16 March 2024

Arm wrestling at the 2023 African Games was held from 18 to 22 March 2024 in Accra, Ghana.

== Medal summary ==
=== Men ===
Event	Gold	Silver	Bronze
Left arm 55 kg	Omar Said; Egypt	Daniel Acquah; Ghana	Sanaa Abdul-Somed; Ghana
Right arm 55 kg	Omar Said; Egypt	Daniel Acquah; Ghana	Sanaa Abdul-Somed; Ghana
Left arm 60 kg	Mohamed Elmeligy; Egypt	Henry Otoo; Ghana	Abdul Issahak; Ghana
Right arm 60 kg	Mohamed Elmeligy; Egypt	Henry Otoo; Ghana	Sumaila Mujeeb; Ghana
Left arm 65 kg	Ali Kassem; Egypt	Isaac Amugi; Ghana	Idowu Yinusa; Nigeria
Right arm 65 kg	Ali Kassem; Egypt	Isaac Amugi; Ghana	Idowu Yinusa; Nigeria
Left arm 75 kg	Godwin Sackey; Ghana	Andria Joseph; Egypt	Wisdom Abromekyi; Ghana
Right arm 75 kg	Andria Joseph; Egypt	Wisdom Abromekyi; Ghana	Godwin Sackey; Ghana
Left arm 85 kg	Mohamed Hassanin; Egypt	Mostafa Salaheldin; Egypt	Samuel Ifeanyi; Nigeria
Right arm 85 kg	Mostafa Youssry; Egypt	Mohamed Hassanin; Egypt	Samuel Ifeanyi; Nigeria
Left arm 90 kg	Edward Asamoah; Ghana	Patrick Miango; Central African Republic	Issah Kunya; Ghana
Right arm 90 kg	Edward Asamoah; Ghana	Issah Kunya; Ghana	Patrick Miango; Central African Republic
Left arm 100 kg	Mohamed Abdelrahman; Egypt	Derrick Adu; Ghana	Abel Thesee; Mauritius
Right arm 100 kg	Mohamed Abdelrahman; Egypt	Derrick Adu; Ghana	Wassoumanou N'Bamba; Togo
Left arm +100 kg	Mostafa Salaheldin; Egypt	Wilhelm Bronkhorst; South Africa	Teteh Ocloo; Togo
Right arm +100 kg	Mostafa Salaheldin; Egypt	Wilhelm Bronkhorst; South Africa	Teteh Ocloo; Togo

=== Women ===
Event	Gold	Silver	Bronze
Left arm 55 kg	Elizabeth Mausi; Nigeria	Racheal Lankai; Ghana	Mabel Yeboah; Ghana
Right arm 55 kg	Mabel Yeboah; Ghana	Racheal Lankai; Ghana	Blessing Nnenna; Nigeria
Left arm 60 kg	Blessed Abeka; Ghana	Phildaus Bukari; Ghana	Eugenia Ntow; Ghana
Right arm 60 kg	Blessed Abeka; Ghana	Eugenia Ntow; Ghana	Phildaus Bukari; Ghana
Left arm 65 kg	Sourou Lalaeye; Benin	Roselyn Lartey; Ghana	Mary Quaye; Ghana
Right arm 65 kg	Sourou Lalaeye; Benin	Mary Quaye; Ghana	Naa Korkor Ackah; Ghana
Left arm 70 kg	Sarah Matthew; Nigeria	Rashida Abass; Ghana	Blessing Adebimpe; Nigeria
Right arm 70 kg	Sarah Matthew; Nigeria	Blessing Adebimpe; Nigeria	Fayza Shaaban; Egypt
Left arm 80 kg	Grace Minta; Ghana	Mariam Amuda; Ghana	Winifred Eze Ndidi; Nigeria
Right arm 80 kg	Grace Minta; Ghana	Winifred Eze Ndidi; Nigeria	Perpetual Nunoo; Ghana
Left arm +80 kg	Fatma Hussein; Egypt	Mariam Kadri; Ghana	Meri Prinsloo; South Africa
Right arm +80 kg	Oyewusi Olubisi; Nigeria	Fatma Hussein; Egypt	Mariam Kadri; Ghana

== Medal table ==
* Host nation (Ghana)

Rank	Nation	Gold	Silver	Bronze	Total
1	Egypt (EGY)	14	4	1	19
2	Ghana (GHA)*	8	19	14	41
3	Nigeria (NGR)	4	2	7	13
4	Benin (BEN)	2	0	0	2
5	South Africa (RSA)	0	2	1	3
6	Central African Republic (CAF)	0	1	1	2
7	Togo (TOG)	0	0	3	3
8	Mauritius (MRI)	0	0	1	1
Totals (8 entries)		28	28	28	84
