= Cameroon at the 2023 African Games =

- Flag of Cameroon
- IOC code: CMR
- NOC: Cameroon Olympic and Sports Committee

in Accra, Ghana 8 March 2024 – 23 March 2024
- Competitors: 64 in 8 sports
- Medals Ranked 17th: Gold 3 Silver 13 Bronze 14 Total 30

African Games appearances
- 1965; 1973; 1978; 1987; 1991; 1995; 1999; 2003; 2007; 2011; 2015; 2019; 2023

Cameroon competed at the 2023 African Games held from 8 to 23 March 2024 in Accra, Ghana. Cameroon competed in 8 sports.

== Medal table ==
Medal	Name	Sport	Event	Date
Gold	Junior Ngadja Nyabeyeu	Weightlifting	Men's 109 kg total	14 March
Gold	Junior Ngadja Nyabeyeu	Weightlifting	Men's 109 kg clean & jerk	14 March
Gold	Emmanuel Eseme	Athletics	Men's 100 metres	19 March
Silver	Blandine Ngiri	Wrestling	Women's freestyle 68 kg	10 March
Silver	Cedric Abossolo	Wrestling	Men's freestyle 86 kg	11 March
Silver	Marie Céline Baba Matia	Judo	Women's −52 kg	12 March
Silver	Audrey Etoua Biock	Judo	Women's −63 kg	13 March
Silver	Zita Ornella Biami	Judo	Women's −70 kg	13 March
Silver	Jeanne Eyenga	Weightlifting	Women's 81 kg total	13 March
Silver	Jeanne Eyenga	Weightlifting	Women's 81 kg snatch	13 March
Silver	Jeanne Eyenga	Weightlifting	Women's 81 kg clean & jerk	13 March
Silver	Junior Ngadja Nyabeyeu	Weightlifting	Men's 109 kg snatch	14 March
Silver	Estelle Momeni	Weightlifting	Women's +87 kg total	14 March
Silver	Estelle Momeni	Weightlifting	Women's +87 kg snatch	14 March
Silver	Estelle Momeni	Weightlifting	Women's +87 kg clean & jerk	14 March
Silver	Claude Itoungue Bongogne	Athletics	Men's 200 metres	22 March
Bronze	Yoan Dassi Tchouela	Karate	Men's kumite −67 kg	8 March
Bronze	Rosine Ntsa Assouga	Wrestling	Women's freestyle 50 kg	10 March
Bronze	Miriam Orock Ngoe Wase	Wrestling	Women's freestyle 53 kg	10 March
Bronze	Jeremie Ngouanom Nzali	Weightlifting	Men's 81 kg total	12 March
Bronze	Jeremie Ngouanom Nzali	Weightlifting	Men's 81 kg snatch	12 March
Bronze	Jeremie Ngouanom Nzali	Weightlifting	Men's 81 kg clean & jerk	12 March
Bronze	Georgika Wesly Djengue Moune	Judo	Women's −78 kg	14 March
Bronze	M Baba Matia; A Etoua Biock; Z Biami; E Kom Teddy / G Djengue Moune; V Ngueya Naheu; F Tahman Zan; R Soppi Mbella	Judo	Mixed teams	15 March
Bronze	Nora Monie	Athletics	Women's discus throw	21 March
Bronze	Adele Mafogang	Athletics	Women's heptathlon	21 March
Bronze	Appolinaire Yinra	Athletics	Men's long jump	22 March
Bronze	Linda Angounou	Athletics	Women's 400 metres hurdles	22 March
Bronze	Junior Fotouo	Boxing	Men's 80 kg	22 March
Bronze	Cameroon	Handball	Women's tournament	22 March
