= Derrick Adu Kwakye =

Ghanaian arm wrestler

Derrick Adu Kwakye (born December 28, 1992) is a Ghanaian arm wrestler who has represented his country at international competitions, most notably at the 2023 African Games. As a prominent figure in Ghana's arm wrestling scene, Adu Kwakye has competed in both the left and right-hand categories, showcasing his strength and dedication to the sport.

== Early life and background ==
Derrick Adu Kwakye was born and raised in Ghana. From a young age, he showed an inclination toward physical sports, developing a passion for arm wrestling during his youth. His early years in the sport were marked by rigorous training and participation in local competitions, which prepared him for a future career at the international level.

== Career in arm wrestling ==
Adu Kwakye's career in arm wrestling has seen him rise through the ranks to become one of Ghana's top athletes in the discipline. His significant achievement was his participation in the 2023 African Games, held in Accra, Ghana. At this event, he represented his country in both the left and right-hand categories, competing against top athletes from across the continent. His performance at these Games was a reflection of his hard work and skill in arm wrestling, a sport that has been growing in popularity in Ghana and across Africa.

Arm wrestling is a sport that requires not only physical strength but also technical skill, endurance, and mental toughness, all of which Adu Kwakye has demonstrated in his matches. His ability to compete at the highest level has made him a role model for aspiring arm wrestlers in Ghana and beyond.

== Training and preparation ==
Derrick Adu Kwakye's training regimen involves a combination of strength training, endurance exercises, and tactical drills. His commitment to the sport has seen him work with some of the best coaches and trainers in Ghana, focusing on improving his technique and physical conditioning. He is known for his discipline and focus, which are key elements of his success.

== Significance in Ghanaian sports ==
Arm wrestling in Ghana has been on the rise in recent years, and athletes like Derrick Adu Kwakye have played a pivotal role in raising the profile of the sport. His participation in international competitions such as the African Games has helped bring attention to arm wrestling in Ghana, inspiring a new generation of athletes to take up the sport.

Derrick Adu Kwakye's contributions to arm wrestling go beyond his personal achievements. As a respected figure in the arm wrestling community, he has been involved in initiatives to promote the sport in schools and local communities. His efforts aim to increase participation and provide young athletes with the opportunity to develop their skills.

== Personal life ==
Outside of his athletic career, Derrick Adu Kwakye is known for his humble and approachable nature. He speaks English and has used his platform to engage with fans and fellow athletes, promoting the values of hard work, perseverance, and sportsmanship.
