= Democratic Republic of the Congo at the 2023 African Games =

- Flag of the Democratic Republic of the Congo
- IOC code: COD
- NOC: Congolese Olympic Committee

in Accra, Ghana 8 March 2024 – 23 March 2024
- Competitors: 152 in 16 sports
- Medals Ranked 20th: Gold 2 Silver 7 Bronze 9 Total 18

African Games appearances (overview)
- 1965; 1973–1978; 1987; 1991; 1995; 1999; 2003; 2007; 2011; 2015; 2019; 2023

Democratic Republic of the Congo competed at the 2023 African Games held from 8 to 23 March 2024 in Accra, Ghana. Democratic Republic of the Congo competed in 16 sports.

== Medal table ==
Medal	Name	Sport	Event	Date
Gold	Steve Kulenguluka	Boxing	Men's 71 kg	22 March
Gold	Peter Pita	Boxing	Men's 80 kg	22 March
Silver	Livens Zola	Boxing	Men's 48 kg	22 March
Silver	Boniface Zengala	Boxing	Men's 67 kg	22 March
Silver	Merveille Mbalayi	Boxing	Women's 63 kg	22 March
Silver	Marie Mwika	Boxing	Women's 81 kg	22 March
Silver	Jorbelle Malewu	Boxing	Women's +81 kg	22 March
Silver	DR Congo	Handball	Men's tournament	22 March
Silver	DR Congo	Handball	Women's tournament	22 March
Bronze	Rosie Tabora	Wrestling	Women's freestyle 68 kg	10 March
Bronze	Rabby Kilandi	Wrestling	Men's freestyle 57 kg	11 March
Bronze	Andy Mukendi	Wrestling	Men's freestyle 74 kg	11 March
Bronze	Aron Mabuba	Wrestling	Men's freestyle 97 kg	11 March
Bronze	Noemie Ayenga; Grace Basiki; Gemima Mabwa Manzanza; Divine Pembe Iyomi	3x3 basketball	Women's U23	22 March
Bronze	Nathan Nlandu	Boxing	Men's 86 kg	22 March
Bronze	Anthony Bweluzeyi	Boxing	Men's +92 kg	22 March
Bronze	Gisele Nyembo	Boxing	Women's 52 kg	22 March
Bronze	Brigitte Mbabi	Boxing	Women's 52 kg	22 March
