= Ndidi Winifred =

Nigerian weightlifter

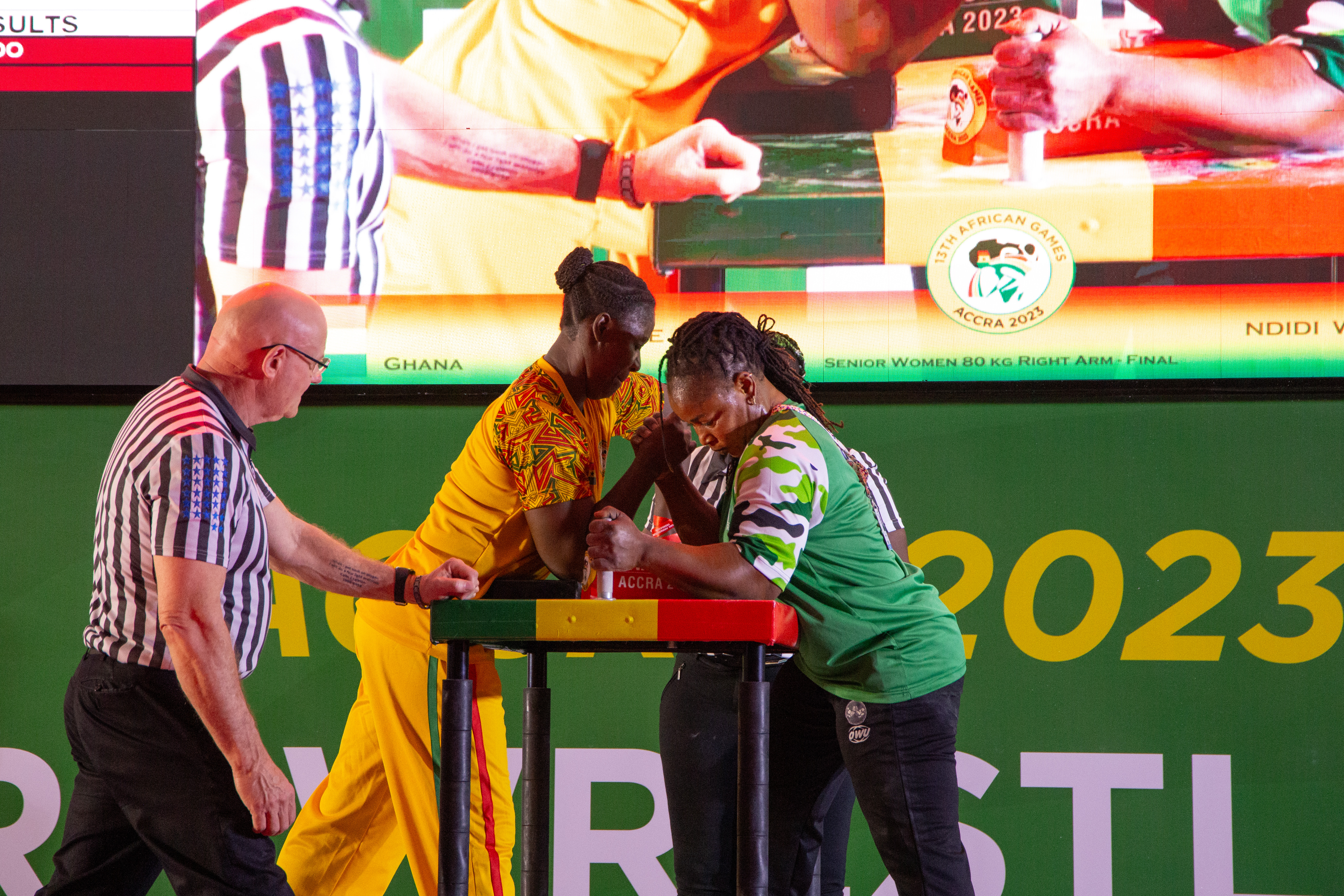
- Arm wrestling at the 2023 African Games - Final

Personal information
- Nationality: Nigerian
- Born: 22 September 1988 (age 38) Asaba, Nigeria
- Weight: 58 kg (128 lb)

Sport
- Sport: Weightlifting
- Event: 58 kg
Medal record
Representing Nigeria
Women's weightlifting
Commonwealth Games
| Silver medal – second place | 2014 Glasgow | Women's 58 kg |
- Updated on 12 October 2014

Ndidi Eze Winifred (born 22 September 1988 in Asaba, Delta State) is a Nigerian athlete who has competed internationally in both weightlifting and arm wrestling. As a weightlifter, she specialized in the 58 kg and 69 kg categories, winning medals at the Commonwealth Games and the African Games..

== Weightlifting career ==
Winifred began her international weightlifting career representing Nigeria in the late 2000s. She competed at the 2010 Commonwealth Games in Delhi, India, in the 58 kg category but did not record a final total.

She went again a few years later at the 2013 Commonwealth Weightlifting Championships in Penang, Malaysia, where she won a gold medal in the 58 kg category with a total lift of 200 kg.

The following year, Winifred competed in the women's 58 kg event at the 2014 Commonwealth Games in Glasgow, Scotland. She won the silver medal with a total lift of 206 kg (90 kg in the snatch and 116 kg in the clean and jerk), finishing behind England's Zoe Smith.

In 2015, Winifred moved up to the women's 69 kg category to compete at the African Games in Brazzaville, Congo. She earned three silver medals in the snatch (90 kg), clean and jerk (120 kg), and total lift (210 kg).

== Arm wrestling career ==
Later in her athletic career, Winifred transitioned to competitive arm wrestling. She represented Nigeria at the 2023 African Games (held in March 2024 in Accra, Ghana), where she competed in the women's 80 kg right-arm event and reached the finals.
