= Rwanda at the 2023 African Games =

- Flag of Rwanda
- IOC code: RWA
- NOC: Rwanda National Olympic and Sports Committee

in Accra, Ghana 8 March 2024 – 23 March 2024
- Competitors: 33 in 5 sports
- Medals Ranked 41st: Gold 0 Silver 0 Bronze 1 Total 1

African Games appearances
- 1987; 1991–2007; 2011; 2015; 2019; 2023

Rwanda competed at the 2023 African Games held from 8 to 23 March 2024 in Accra, Ghana. Rwanda competed in 5 sports.

== Medal table ==
Medal	Name	Sport	Event	Date
Bronze	Diane Ingabire	Cycling	Women's elites	12 March

== Cricket ==
=== Women's ===
Group play

Pos	Team	Pld	W	L	T	NR	Pts	NRR	Qualification
1	Zimbabwe	3	3	0	0	0	6	1.438	Advanced to the knockout stage
2	Uganda	3	2	1	0	0	4	0.529	Advanced to the knockout stage
3	Kenya	3	1	2	0	0	2	−1.018	
4	Rwanda	3	0	3	0	0	0	−0.975	

Source: ESPNcricinfo

7 March 2024
13:45
Scorecard

Rwanda; 72/7 (14 overs)	v	Zimbabwe; 75/3 (13.4 overs)
Gisele Ishimwe 22 (28); Precious Marange 2/8 (3 overs)		Modester Mupachikwa 38 (38); Alice Ikuzwe 1/4 (1 overs)

Zimbabwe won by 7 wickets
Achimota Oval A, Accra
Umpires: Habib Enesi (Nga) and Isaac Oyieko (Ken)
Player of the match: Modester Mupachikwa (Zim)

- Rwanda won the toss and elected to bat.
- The match was reduced to 14 overs per side due to rain.

8 March 2024
13:45
Scorecard

Rwanda; 69 (18.3 overs)	v	Kenya; 72/3 (17 overs)
Clarisse Uwase 24 (28); Jemimah Ndanu 3/21 (4 overs)		Esther Wachira 42* (49); Rosine Irera 2/11 (4 overs)

Kenya won by 7 wickets
Achimota Oval B, Accra
Umpires: Iknow Chabi (Zim) and Patric Makumbi (Uga)
Player of the match: Esther Wachira (Ken)

- Rwanda won the toss and elected to bat.

10 March 2024
13:45
Scorecard

Uganda; 106/2 (20 overs)	v	Rwanda; 76/8 (20 overs)
Immaculate Nakisuuyi 57* (56); Alice Ikuzwe 1/10 (4 overs)		Marie Bimenyimana 28 (39); Immaculate Nakisuuyi 4/15 (4 overs)

Uganda won by 30 runs
Achimota Oval B, Accra
Umpires: Iknow Chabi (Zim) and Habib Enesi (Nga)
Player of the match: Immaculate Nakisuuyi (Uga)

- Rwanda won the toss and elected to field.
