= Central African Republic at the 2023 African Games =

- Flag of the Central African Republic
- IOC code: CAF
- NOC: Central African National Olympic and Sports Committee

in Accra, Ghana 8 March 2024 – 23 March 2024
- Medals Ranked 34th: Gold 0 Silver 1 Bronze 3 Total 4

African Games appearances
- 1965; 1973; 1978; 1987; 1991; 1995; 1999; 2003; 2007; 2011; 2015; 2019; 2023

Central African Republic competed at the 2023 African Games held from 8 to 23 March 2024 in Accra, Ghana.

== Medal table ==
Medal	Name	Sport	Event	Date
Silver	Patrick Miango	Arm wrestling	Men's left arm 90 kg	15 March
Bronze	Jason Zacko	Judo	Men's −66 kg	12 March
Bronze	Nadia Guimendego	Judo	Women's −63 kg	13 March
Bronze	Patrick Miango	Arm wrestling	Men's right arm 90 kg	16 March
