= Ghana at the 2023 African Games =

- Flag of Ghana
- IOC code: GHA
- NOC: Ghana Olympic Committee

in Accra, Ghana 8 March 2024 – 23 March 2024
- Medals Ranked 6th: Gold 19 Silver 29 Bronze 21 Total 69

African Games appearances
- 1965; 1973; 1978; 1987; 1991; 1995; 1999; 2003; 2007; 2011; 2015; 2019; 2023

Ghana competed at the 2023 African Games held from 8 to 23 March 2024 in Accra, Ghana.

== Medal table ==
| Medal | Name | Sport | Event | Date |
|---|---|---|---|---|
| Gold | Winnifred Ntumi | Weightlifting | Women's 49 kg total | 10 March |
| Gold | Godwin Sackey | Arm wrestling | Men's left arm 75 kg | 15 March |
| Gold | Edward Asamoah | Arm wrestling | Men's left arm 90 kg | 15 March |
| Gold | Blessed Abeka | Arm wrestling | Women's left arm 60 kg | 15 March |
| Gold | Grace Minta | Arm wrestling | Women's left arm 80 kg | 15 March |
| Gold | Edward Asamoah | Arm wrestling | Men's right arm 90 kg | 16 March |
| Gold | Mabel Yeboah | Arm wrestling | Women's right arm 55 kg | 16 March |
| Gold | Blessed Abeka | Arm wrestling | Women's right arm 60 kg | 16 March |
| Gold | Grace Minta | Arm wrestling | Women's right arm 80 kg | 16 March |
| Gold | Rose Amoanimaa Yeboah | Athletics | Women's high jump | 19 March |
| Gold | Ghana | Football | Women's tournament | 21 March |
| Gold | Joseph Amoah | Athletics | Men's 200 metres | 22 March |
| Gold | Cadman Evans Yamoah | Athletics | Men's high jump | 22 March |
| Gold | Mohammed Aryeetey | Boxing | Men's −48 kg | 22 March |
| Gold | Mohammed Amadu | Boxing | Men's −54 kg | 22 March |
| Gold | Joseph Commey | Boxing | Men's −60 kg | 22 March |
| Gold | Samuel Takyi | Boxing | Men's −63.5 kg | 22 March |
| Gold | Ghana | Football | Men's tournament | 22 March |
| Gold | Ghana | Field hockey | Women's tournament | 22 March |
| Silver | Abeiku Jackson | Swimming | Men's 50 metre butterfly | 10 March |
| Silver | Winnifred Ntumi | Weightlifting | Women's 49 kg snatch | 10 March |
| Silver | Winnifred Ntumi | Weightlifting | Women's 49 kg clean & jerk | 10 March |
| Silver | Daniel Acquah | Arm wrestling | Men's left arm 55 kg | 15 March |
| Silver | Henry Otoo | Arm wrestling | Men's left arm 60 kg | 15 March |
| Silver | Isaac Amugi | Arm wrestling | Men's left arm 65 kg | 15 March |
| Silver | Derrick Adu Kwakye | Arm wrestling | Men's left arm 100 kg | 15 March |
| Silver | Racheal Lankai | Arm wrestling | Women's left arm 55 kg | 15 March |
| Silver | Phildaus Bukari | Arm wrestling | Women's left arm 60 kg | 15 March |
| Silver | Roselyn Lartey | Arm wrestling | Women's left arm 65 kg | 15 March |
| Silver | Rashida Abass | Arm wrestling | Women's left arm 70 kg | 15 March |
| Silver | Mariam Amuda | Arm wrestling | Women's left arm 80 kg | 15 March |
| Silver | Mariam Kadri | Arm wrestling | Women's left arm +80 kg | 15 March |
| Silver | Daniel Acquah | Arm wrestling | Men's right arm 55 kg | 16 March |
| Silver | Henry Otoo | Arm wrestling | Men's right arm 60 kg | 16 March |
| Silver | Isaac Amugi | Arm wrestling | Men's right arm 65 kg | 16 March |
| Silver | Wisdom Abromekyi | Arm wrestling | Men's right arm 75 kg | 16 March |
| Silver | Issah Kunya | Arm wrestling | Men's right arm 90 kg | 16 March |
| Silver | Derrick Adu Kwakye | Arm wrestling | Men's right arm 100 kg | 16 March |
| Silver | Racheal Lankai | Arm wrestling | Women's right arm 55 kg | 16 March |
| Silver | Eugenia Ntow | Arm wrestling | Women's right arm 60 kg | 16 March |
| Silver | Mary Quaye | Arm wrestling | Women's right arm 65 kg | 16 March |
| Silver | Joseph Amoah; Edwin Gadayi; Solomon Kweku; Benjamin Azamati | Athletics | Men's 4 × 100 metres relay | 20 March |
| Silver | William Amponsah | Athletics | Men's half marathon | 22 March |
| Silver | Fredrick Asante; Francis Dake; Henry Kpogo; Stephen Semey | 3x3 basketball | Men's U23 | 22 March |
| Silver | Abubakar Kamoko | Boxing | Men's −86 kg | 22 March |
| Silver | Ghana | Field hockey | Men's tournament | 22 March |
| Silver | Kelvin Amuzu | Taekwondo | Men's over 17 | 22 March |
| Silver | Erica Tuagbor | Taekwondo | Women's over 17 | 22 March |
| Bronze | Abeiku Jackson | Swimming | Men's 100 metre butterfly | 12 March |
| Bronze | Sanaa Abdul-Somed | Arm wrestling | Men's left arm 55 kg | 15 March |
| Bronze | Abdul Issahak | Arm wrestling | Men's left arm 60 kg | 15 March |
| Bronze | Wisdom Abromekyi | Arm wrestling | Men's left arm 75 kg | 15 March |
| Bronze | Issah Kunya | Arm wrestling | Men's left arm 90 kg | 15 March |
| Bronze | Mabel Yeboah | Arm wrestling | Women's left arm 55 kg | 15 March |
| Bronze | Eugenia Ntow | Arm wrestling | Women's left arm 60 kg | 15 March |
| Bronze | Mary Quaye | Arm wrestling | Women's left arm 65 kg | 15 March |
| Bronze | Sanaa Abdul-Somed | Arm wrestling | Men's right arm 55 kg | 16 March |
| Bronze | Sumaila Ujeeb | Arm wrestling | Men's right arm 60 kg | 16 March |
| Bronze | Godwin Sackey | Arm wrestling | Men's right arm 75 kg | 16 March |
| Bronze | Phildaus Bukari | Arm wrestling | Women's right arm 60 kg | 16 March |
| Bronze | Naa Korkor Ackah | Arm wrestling | Women's right arm 65 kg | 16 March |
| Bronze | Perpetual Nunoo | Arm wrestling | Women's right arm 80 kg | 16 March |
| Bronze | Mariam Kadri | Arm wrestling | Women's right arm +80 kg | 16 March |
| Bronze | Halutie Hor; Mary Boakye; Janet Mensah; Doris Mensah; Benedicta Kwartemaa | Athletics | Women's 4 × 100 metres relay | 20 March |
| Bronze | Amoako Hannah | 3x3 basketball (Shoot Out Contest) | Women's U23 | 22 March |
| Bronze | Theophilus Allotey | Boxing | Men's −51 kg | 22 March |
| Bronze | Janet Acqua | Boxing | Women's −48 kg | 22 March |
| Bronze | Gerald Sarfo | Taekwondo | Men's under 40 | 22 March |
| Bronze | Ghana | Volleyball | Men's tournament | 23 March |

== Cricket ==
=== Men's ===
Group play

| Pos | Team | Pld | W | L | T | NR | Pts | NRR | Qualification |
|---|---|---|---|---|---|---|---|---|---|
| 1 | Uganda | 3 | 3 | 0 | 0 | 0 | 6 | 3.283 | Advanced to the knockout stage |
| 2 | Kenya | 3 | 2 | 1 | 0 | 0 | 4 | 1.049 | Advanced to the knockout stage |
| 3 | University Sports South Africa | 3 | 1 | 2 | 0 | 0 | 2 | 1.000 | |
| 4 | Ghana | 3 | 0 | 3 | 0 | 0 | 0 | −5.888 | |

Source: ESPNcricinfo

17 March 2024
13:50
Scorecard

| University Sports South Africa; 237/2 (20 overs) | v | Ghana; 103/7 (20 overs) |
| George Van Heerden 107* (57); Godfred Bakiweyem 1/46 (4 overs) | | James Vifah 41 (25); Jesse Prodehl 2/10 (4 overs) |

University Sport South Africa won by 134 runs
Achimota Oval A, Accra
Umpires: Adil Kassam (Tan) and Patric Makumbi (Uga)
Player of the match: George Van Heerden (University Sports South Africa)

- University Sports South Africa won the toss and elected to bat.

18 March 2024
13:50
Scorecard

| Uganda; 194/5 (20 overs) | v | Ghana; 73 (16 overs) |
| Simon Ssesazi 90 (50); Obed Harvey 5/36 (4 overs) | | Richmond Baaleri 27 (35); Juma Miyagi 3/10 (3 overs) |

Uganda won by 121 runs
Achimota Oval B, Accra
Umpires: Sarah Dambanevana (Zim) and Isaac Oyieko (Ken)
Player of the match: Simon Ssesazi (Uga)

- Uganda won the toss and elected to bat.
- Lee Nyarko (Gha) made his T20I debut.
- Obed Harvey (Gha) took his first five-wicket haul in T20Is.

20 March 2024
09:30
Scorecard

| Ghana; 111 (18.3 overs) | v | Kenya; 115/3 (11.1 overs) |
| Obed Harvey 33 (33); Rakep Patel 3/12 (4 overs) | | Collins Obuya 68 (30); Richmond Baaleri 3/55 (4 overs) |

Kenya won by 7 wickets
Achimota Oval B, Accra
Umpires: Habib Enesi (Nga) and Adil Kassam (Tan)
Player of the match: Collins Obuya (Ken)

- Ghana won the toss and elected to bat.
- Aarnav Patel (Ken) made his T20I debut.

== Field hockey ==
Summary

Key:

- FT – After full-time.
- P – Match decided by penalty-shootout.

| Team | Event | Group stage | | | | Final / BM | |
| Team | Event | Opposition Score | Opposition Score | Opposition Score | Rank | Opposition Score | Rank |
|---|---|---|---|---|---|---|---|
| Ghana men's | Men's tournament | Nigeria; W 1–0 | Kenya; W 3–0 | Egypt; L 0–1 | 2 | Egypt; L 2–2 (3–1 s.o.) | 2 |
| Ghana women's | Women's tournament | Kenya; W 4–1 | Nigeria; W 1–0 | Bye | 1 | Nigeria; W 0–0 (4–3 s.o.) | 1 |

=== Men's ===
Group play

| Pos | Team | Pld | W | D | L | GF | GA | GD | Pts | Qualification |
|---|---|---|---|---|---|---|---|---|---|---|
| 1 | Egypt | 3 | 3 | 0 | 0 | 9 | 6 | +3 | 9 | Final |
| 2 | Ghana (H) | 3 | 2 | 0 | 1 | 4 | 2 | +2 | 6 | Final |
| 3 | Nigeria | 3 | 1 | 0 | 2 | 6 | 7 | −1 | 3 | Third place match |
| 4 | Kenya | 3 | 0 | 0 | 3 | 4 | 8 | −4 | 0 | Third place match |

Source: FIH
Rules for classification: 1) points; 2) matches won; 3) goal difference; 4) goals for; 5) head-to-head result; 6) field goals scored.
(H) Hosts

18 March 2024
10:00

| Egypt | 5–4 | Nigeria |
|---|---|---|
| El-Ganaini 17', 36'; Ragab 29'; Sayed 32'; Mamdouh 51' | Report | Samaila 21', 30'; Victor 32', 49' |

Umpires:
Deepak Joshi (IND)
Nortey Ebenezer (GHA)

18 March 2024
16:00

| Kenya | 1–3 | Ghana |
|---|---|---|
| Wiswa 59' | Report | Fialor 38'; Addison 43'; Ntiamoah 45' |

Umpires:
Mohamed Hassan (EGY)
Simon Awasa (NGR)

20 March 2024
16:00

| Ghana | 0–1 | Egypt |
|---|---|---|
| | Report | El-Ganaini 41' |

Umpires:
Simon Awasa (NGR)
Deepak Joshi (IND)

=== Women's ===
Group play

| Pos | Team | Pld | W | D | L | GF | GA | GD | Pts | Qualification |
|---|---|---|---|---|---|---|---|---|---|---|
| 1 | Ghana (H) | 2 | 2 | 0 | 0 | 5 | 1 | +4 | 6 | Final |
| 2 | Nigeria | 2 | 1 | 0 | 1 | 1 | 1 | 0 | 3 | Final |
| 3 | Kenya | 2 | 0 | 0 | 2 | 1 | 5 | −4 | 0 | |

Source: FIH
Rules for classification: 1) points; 2) matches won; 3) goal difference; 4) goals for; 5) head-to-head result; 6) field goals scored.
(H) Hosts

17 March 2024
10:00

| Kenya | 1–4 | Ghana |
|---|---|---|
| Onyango 56' | Report | Opoku 9', 33'; Berko 19'; Narkuor 27' |

Umpires:
Kamile Mockaitytė (LTU)
Charity Onosimuan (NGR)

18 March 2024
14:00

| Nigeria | 0–1 | Ghana |
|---|---|---|
| | Report | Berko 19' |

Umpires:
Kamile Mockaitytė (LTU)
Haroon Rashid (PAK)

Final

22 March 2024
13:30

| Ghana | 0–0 | Nigeria |
|---|---|---|
| | Report |
Penalties
| Opoku (penalty shoot-out scored); Umaru (penalty shoot-out scored); Amoako (penalty shoot-out scored); Bamfo (penalty shoot-out missed); Owusuwaa (penalty shoot-out missed); Umaru (penalty shoot-out missed); Opoku (penalty shoot-out missed); Amoako (penalty shoot-out scored) | 4–3 | (penalty shoot-out scored) Johnson; (penalty shoot-out missed) Jerry; (penalty shoot-out scored) Christopher; (penalty shoot-out scored) Saturday; (penalty shoot-out missed) Billo; (penalty shoot-out missed) Christopher; (penalty shoot-out missed) Johnson; (penalty shoot-out missed) Jerry |

Umpires:
Kamile Mockaitytė (LTU)
Haroon Rashid (PAK)
