= Elizabeth Opoku =

Ghanaian field hockey forward and national team captain

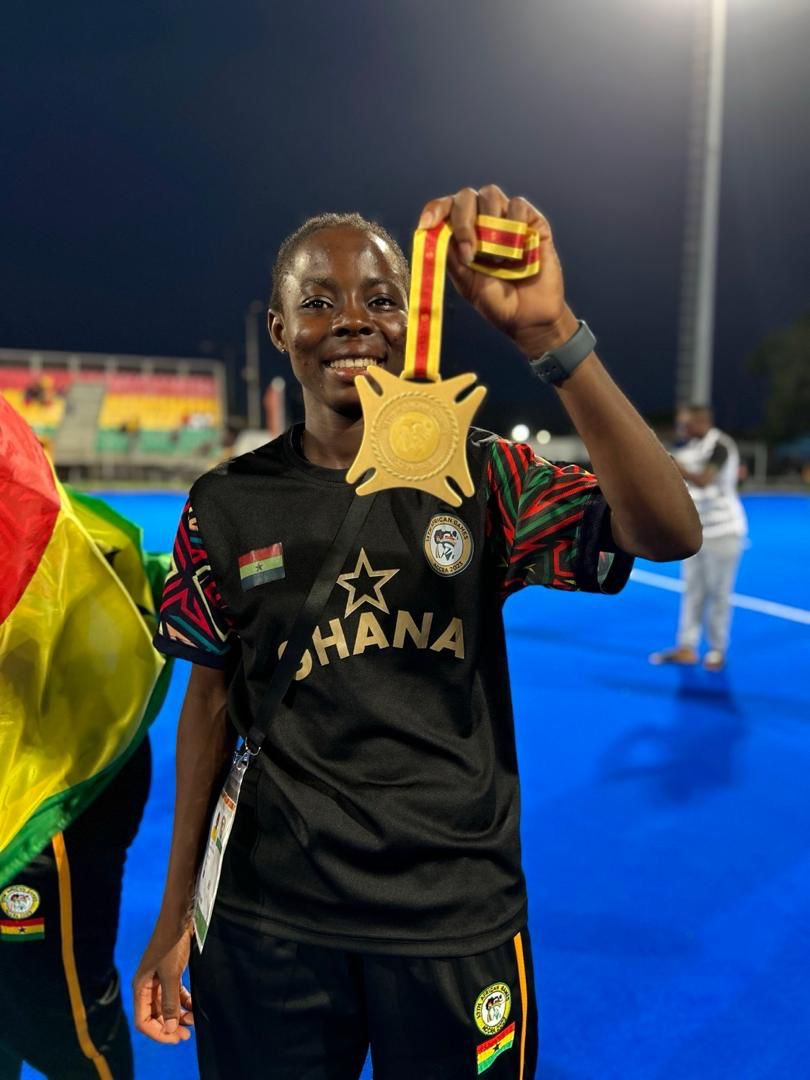
- Opoku representing Ghana in the 2023 African Games

Personal information
- Full name: Elizabeth Opoku
- Born: 2 February 1994 (age 32) Ghana

Sport
- Sport: Field hockey
- Position: Forward
- Club: Ghana Revenue Authority Royal Ladies
Youth career
- Years: Team
- 2009–2010: Ghana U-17
National team
Years	Team	Caps	Goals
2012–present	Ghana	64	(27)
2013	Ghana U21	6	(6)
Medal record
Representing Ghana
Field hockey
African Games
Gold medal – first place	2023 Accra	Team
Africa Cup of Nations
Silver medal – second place	2022 Accra
Silver medal – second place	2017 Ismailia
Silver medal – second place	2013 Nairobi
- Updated on 15 October 2025

Elizabeth Opoku (born 2 February 1994) is a Ghanaian field hockey player who captains the Ghana women's national hockey team, the Black Sticks Ladies. Regarded as one of Ghana's most consistent and skillful female hockey player, she has represented the country in numerous continental and international competitions, notably as a four-time winner of the Sports Writers Association of Ghana (SWAG) Hockey Player of the Year award. Opoku is a founding member of the non-governmental organisation, ChariCare, which focuses on providing support to underprivileged children and communities. She is also a strong advocate for grassroots hockey development and helping young players secure educational support and equipment.

== Early life and education ==
Opoku developed an interest in hockey at a young age, first catching the nation's attention in 2009 as a 15-year-old high schooler at Kumasi Girls Senior High School. She was quickly drafted into the Ghana U-17 squad for the 2010 Hockey Youth Olympic qualifiers and later played for the U-21 team. Before discovering hockey, she was a budding footballer, but faced strong opposition from her mother regarding her sporting ambitions. She later attended the University of Ghana, where she also competed in other sports, including middle-distance running, football, handball, and netball, earning several GUSA (Ghana Universities Sports Association) medals. She chose to complete her university education despite receiving an early job offer from the GRA Customs Division, a decision she credited with long-term benefits for her career.

== Club career ==
Opoku plays for the Ghana Revenue Authority (GRA) Ladies Hockey Club, also known as the GRA Royal Ladies. As captain, she led the team to an undisputed "grand slam" in 2025, winning all four major competitions: the Africa Cup for Club Champions (ACCC), the Greater Accra Hockey League, the T-Tommy tournament, and the Oguaa Fetu tournament, maintaining an undefeated league record. She led the GRA Royal Ladies to their fifth overall ACCC crown in 2025, defeating Egypt's Smouha Hockey Club 3–0 in the final. The team was particularly ruthless during the 2025 ACCC tournament, scoring 27 goals and conceding just two in five games. Following the team's latest continental success, the GRA Commissioner-General rewarded each player with GH₵ 10,000 for the ACCC victory. Opoku has stated she idolizes former national captain Ebenezer Frimpong and studies Dutch star Felice Albers.

== International career ==
Opoku earned a place in the Ghana Women's Senior National Hockey Team, The Black Sticks, by 2012. She plays primarily as a Forward (or Striker), wearing the number 10 jersey. She was named the captain of the Black Sticks Ladies in October 2023. As of her most recent FIH profile, she has recorded 64 caps and scored 27 goals for the senior outdoor national team.

Elizabeth Opoku
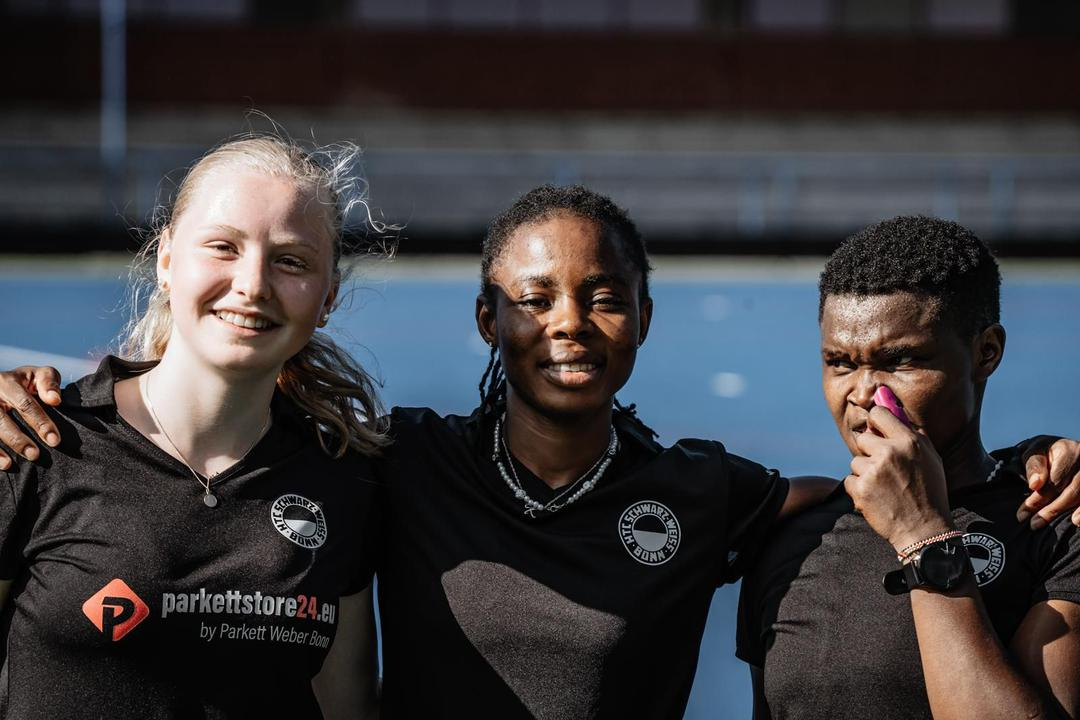
- Opoku in Germany in one of the teams seasonals

Sport
- Sport: Field hockey

=== 2025 Africa Cup of Nations ===
Opoku has been named to the provisional squad for the 2025 Women's Hockey Africa Cup of Nations, scheduled to be held in Ismailia, Egypt, from October 11–18, 2025. Ghana will compete against South Africa, Egypt (Hosts), Kenya, and Nigeria in the tournament.

=== Tournament highlights ===
- African Games: She played a crucial role in the team that clinched Ghana's first-ever hockey gold medal at the 2023 African Games in Accra, where she scored 2 field goals.
- Africa Hockey Cup of Nations: Her silver medal in the 2022 edition secured qualification for the Commonwealth Games. She was the Best Player and Top Scorer in the 2013 edition in Kenya.
- Commonwealth Games: She has featured in the 2018 and 2022 Commonwealth Games.
- FIH World League: She was adjudged the Best Young Female Player at the FIH World League series in Nairobi, Kenya, in 2014.

== Legacy and recognition ==
Opoku is one of Ghana's most decorated female athletes, often dubbed the “Queen of Ghanaian Hockey.” Her numerous accolades include:

- SWAG Hockey Player of the Year: A four-time winner (2014, 2015, 2019, 2024).
- Ghana's Outstanding Woman in Sports (GOWA): A two-time winner (2019 and 2024).
- Africa Cup of Nations (2013): Best Player and Top Scorer.
- FIH Best Young Female Player: Awarded at the World League series in 2014.

== Philanthropy ==
Opoku is a founding member of ChariCare, a non-governmental organisation dedicated to supporting underprivileged children and communities, particularly focusing on providing equipment and educational assistance to young hockey players outside the main hockey regions. She has also used her platform to advocate for employment opportunities for her unemployed teammates at the Ghana Revenue Authority.
