= King Kalu =

Nigerian weightlifter (born 1995)

Personal information
- Full name: King Kalu
- Born: 11 November 1995 (age 30)
- Weight: 60.39 kg (133.1 lb)

Sport
- Country: Nigeria
- Sport: Weightlifting
- Weight class: 62 kg
- Team: National team
Medal record
Representing Nigeria
African Games
Gold medal – first place	2019 Rabat	55 kg Clean & Jerk
Silver medal – second place	2019 Rabat	55 kg Total
Bronze medal – third place	2019 Rabat	55 kg Snatch
- Updated on 30 May 2020

King Kalu (born 11 November 1995) is a Nigerian male weightlifter, competing in the 62 kg category and representing Nigeria at international competitions. He participated at the 2014 Commonwealth Games in the 62 kg event.

== Major competitions ==
Year	Venue	Weight	Snatch (kg)				Clean & Jerk (kg)				Total	Rank
Year	Venue	Weight	1	2	3	Rank	1	2	3	Rank	Total	Rank
Commonwealth Games
2014	Glasgow, Scotland	62 kg	105	~~110~~	~~110~~	—N/a	140	~~145~~	~~145~~	—N/a	245	14
