= South Africa at the 2023 African Games =

- Flag of South Africa
- IOC code: RSA
- NOC: South African Sports Confederation and Olympic Committee

in Accra, Ghana 8 March 2024 – 23 March 2024
- Competitors: 173 in 17 sports
- Flag bearers: Nondumiso Shangase; Leo Williams
- Medals Ranked 3rd: Gold 32 Silver 32 Bronze 42 Total 106

African Games appearances (overview)
- 1995; 1999; 2003; 2007; 2011; 2015; 2019; 2023

South Africa competed at the 2023 African Games held from 8 to 23 March 2024 in Accra, Ghana. In total, 226 athletes represented South Africa in 17 sports.

== Medal summary ==
=== Medal table ===
Medal	Name	Sport	Event	Date
Gold	Caitlin de Lange	Swimming	Women's 100m Freestyle	9 March
Gold	Clayton Jimmie	Swimming	Men's 100m Freestyle	9 March
Gold	Catherine van Rensburg	Swimming	Women's 1500 metre freestyle	9 March
Gold	Georgia Els; Andrew Ross; Caitlin de Lange; Clayton Jimmie; Catherine van Rensburg	Swimming	Mixed 4x100m Freestyle Relay Final	9 March
Gold	Hayley Preen	Cycling	Road Race Women Elite/U23	9 March
Gold	Johanita Scholtz	Badminton	Women's Singles	10 March
Gold	Simone Moll	Swimming	Women's 100m Breaststroke	10 March
Gold	Dillon Geary	Cycling	Road Race Men U23	10 March
Gold	Georgia Els; Andrew Ross; Caitlin de Lange; Clayton Jimmie; Catherine van Rensburg	Swimming	Mixed 4x200m Freestyle Relay Final	10 March
Gold	Catherine van Rensburg	Swimming	Women's 400m Freestyle freestyle	11 March
Gold	Leigh McMorran; Tazmyn Robson; Hannah Mouton; Catherine van Rensburg; Kate Meyer	Swimming	Women's 4x200m Freestyle Relay	11 March
Gold	Caitlin de Lange	Swimming	Women's 50m Backstroke	11 March
Silver	Leigh McMorran	Swimming	Women's 200 metre breaststroke	9 March
Silver	Matthew Caldwell	Swimming	Men's 800m Freestyle	9 March
Silver	Dillon Geary	Cycling	Road Race Men	10 March
Silver	Georgia Els	Swimming	Women's 100m Breaststroke	10 March
Silver	Tayla Jonker	Swimming	Women's 200m Backstroke	10 March
Silver	Hannah Mouton	Swimming	Women's 200m Freestyle	10 March
Silver	Matthew Caldwell	Swimming	Men's 400m Freestyle	11 March
Silver	Cameron Casali; Tumelo Mahan; Matthew Caldwell; Andrew Ross	Swimming	Men's 4x200m Freestyle Relay	11 March
Silver	Jonah Pool-Jones	Swimming	Men's 50m Backstroke	11 March
Silver	Tayla Jonker	Swimming	Women's 50m Backstroke	11 March
Silver	Kate Meyer	Swimming	Women's 200m Breaststroke	11 March
Silver	Caitlin de Lange	Swimming	Women's 50m Butterfly	11 March
Silver	Anneke Spies	Weightlifting	Women's Competition Cat.59kg	11 March
Silver	Anneke Spies	Weightlifting	Women's Competition Cat.59kg Snatch	11 March
Silver	Anneke Spies	Weightlifting	Women's Competition Cat.59kg Clean & Jerk	11 March
Silver	Wilhelm Bronkhorst	Armwrestling	Men's Left arm +100 kg	18 - 22 March
Silver	Wilhelm Bronkhorst	Armwrestling	Men's Right arm +100 kg	18 - 22 March
Bronze	Maxine Willemse	Karate	Women's Karate individual	7 March
Bronze	Lailaa Edwards; Musfiquh Kalam; Danisha Patel; Rochica Sonday	Table tennis	Women's Team	7 March
Bronze	Jesse Sim	Karate	Men's Karate individual	8 March
Bronze	Marinda Roetz	Karate	Women's Kumite -50kg	8 March
Bronze	Bradley Ho-Tong; Jesse Sim; Sibingiseni Ngwenya	Karate	Men Kumite Team	9 March
Bronze	Liam Vehni	Swimming	Men's 200m Butterfly	9 March
Bronze	Jarred Elliott; Robert Summers	Badminton	Men's doubles	10 March
Bronze	Caden Kakora; Johanita Scholtz	Badminton	Mixed doubles	10 March
Bronze	Helgaard Muller	Swimming	Men's 200m Backstroke	10 March
Bronze	Liam Vehbi	Swimming	Men's 200m Butterfly	10 March
Bronze	Jarden Eaton	Swimming	Men's 50m Butterfly	10 March
Bronze	Banele Mhango	Chess	Men's Blitz Individual	11 March
Bronze	Andrew Ross	Swimming	Men's 200m Breaststroke	11 March
Bronze	Cameron Casali	Swimming	Men's 400m Freestyle	11 March
Bronze	Georgia Els	Swimming	Women's 200m Breaststroke	11 March
Bronze	Jon-Antohein Phillips	Weightlifting	Men's Competition Cat. 73kg	11 March
Bronze	Jon-Antohein Phillips	Weightlifting	Men's Competition Cat. 73kg Snatch	11 March
Bronze	Jon-Antohein Phillips	Weightlifting	Men's Competition Cat. 73kg Clean & Jerk	11 March
Bronze	Ben Theron	Wrestling	Men's Freestyle 86kg	11 March
Bronze	Lillian Mbena	Wrestling	Women's Freestyle 76kg	11 March
Bronze	Meri Prinsloo	Armwrestling	Women's Left arm +80 kg	18 - 22 March

== Arm Wrestling ==
South Africa has won three medals across the arm wrestling competitions. Wilhelm Bronkhorst won a silver medal in both the "left arm +100 kg" category and the "right arm +100 kg". For the women, Meri Prinsloo won a bronze medal in the "left arm +80 kg" category.

== Athletics ==
39 athletes were scheduled to compete in athletes.

=== Men's ===
Team roster

The squad was announced on 12 February 2024.

- Antonio Alkana
- Allan Cumming
- Keegan Fourie
- Lindukuhle Gora
- Victor Hogan
- Gardeo Isaacs
- Mpho Links
- Precious Mashele
- Asande Mthembu
- Sizwe Nbebele
- Anele Nzqanzwa
- Friedrich Pretorius
- Francois Prinsloo
- Tumisang Shezi
- Valco van Wyk

=== Women's ===
Team roster

The squad was announced on 12 February 2024.

- Taylon Bieldt
- Miranda Coetzee
- Ashley Erasmus
- Marione Fourie
- Zeney Geldenhuys
- Jessica Groenewald
- Nicole Janse van Rensburg
- Phindile Kubheka
- Joviale Mbisha
- Nwabisa Mjoli
- Shirley Nekhubui
- Cian Oldknow
- Miré Reinstorf
- Ischke Senekal
- Banele Shabangu
- Yolandi Stander
- Angelique Strydom
- Tonet Tallie
- Tamzin Thomas
- Collett Uys
- Mckyla van der Westhuizen
- Jo-Ane van Dyk
- Jana van Schalkwyk
- Shannon Verster
- Marli Viljoen

== Badminton ==
8 athletes were scheduled to compete in athletes.

== Cricket ==
=== Men's ===
Team roster

The squad was announced on 12 February 2024.

- Dylan Bester
- Lehan Botha
- Hardus Coetzer
- Ethan Fosler
- Maahir Joseph
- Lifa Ntanzi
- Minenhle Ntobela
- Heinrigh Pieterse
- Jesse Prodehl
- Jason Raubenheimer
- Nathan Roux
- Lwandi Tywaku
- George van Heerden
- Aohiwe Yako

Group play

Pos	Team	Pld	W	L	T	NR	Pts	NRR	Qualification
1	Uganda	3	3	0	0	0	6	3.283	Advanced to the knockout stage
2	Kenya	3	2	1	0	0	4	1.049	Advanced to the knockout stage
3	University Sports South Africa	3	1	2	0	0	2	1.000	
4	Ghana	3	0	3	0	0	0	−5.888	

Source: ESPNcricinfo

17 March 2024
13:50
Scorecard

University Sports South Africa; 237/2 (20 overs)	v	Ghana; 103/7 (20 overs)
George Van Heerden 107* (57); Godfred Bakiweyem 1/46 (4 overs)		James Vifah 41 (25); Jesse Prodehl 2/10 (4 overs)

University Sport South Africa won by 134 runs
Achimota Oval A, Accra
Umpires: Adil Kassam (Tan) and Patric Makumbi (Uga)
Player of the match: George Van Heerden (University Sports South Africa)

- University Sports South Africa won the toss and elected to bat.

18 March 2024
13:50
Scorecard

Uganda; 194/5 (20 overs)	v	Ghana; 73 (16 overs)
Simon Ssesazi 90 (50); Obed Harvey 5/36 (4 overs)		Richmond Baaleri 27 (35); Juma Miyagi 3/10 (3 overs)

Uganda won by 121 runs
Achimota Oval B, Accra
Umpires: Sarah Dambanevana (Zim) and Isaac Oyieko (Ken)
Player of the match: Simon Ssesazi (Uga)

- Uganda won the toss and elected to bat.
- Lee Nyarko (Gha) made his T20I debut.
- Obed Harvey (Gha) took his first five-wicket haul in T20Is.

20 March 2024
09:30
Scorecard

Ghana; 111 (18.3 overs)	v	Kenya; 115/3 (11.1 overs)
Obed Harvey 33 (33); Rakep Patel 3/12 (4 overs)		Collins Obuya 68 (30); Richmond Baaleri 3/55 (4 overs)

Kenya won by 7 wickets
Achimota Oval B, Accra
Umpires: Habib Enesi (Nga) and Adil Kassam (Tan)
Player of the match: Collins Obuya (Ken)

- Ghana won the toss and elected to bat.
- Aarnav Patel (Ken) made his T20I debut.

=== Women's ===
Team roster

The squad was announced on 12 February 2024.

- Nobulumko Baneti
- Joy Botha
- Annerie Dercksen
- Jenna Evans
- Ghandi Jafta
- Leah Jones
- Simone Lourens
- Karabo Meso
- Seshine Naidu
- Kayla Reyneke
- Nondumiso Shangase
- Miane Smith
- Faye Tunnicliffe
- Jané Winster
- Caitlin Wyngaard

Group play

Pos	Team	Pld	W	L	T	NR	Pts	NRR	Qualification
1	South Africa Emerging	3	2	1	0	0	4	1.887	Advanced to the knockout stage
2	Nigeria	3	1	1	0	1	3	0.778	Advanced to the knockout stage
3	Tanzania	3	1	1	0	1	3	−1.130	
4	Namibia	3	1	2	0	0	2	−1.421	

Source: ESPNcricinfo

7 March 2024
09:00
Scorecard

Namibia; 89/7 (20 overs)	v	South Africa Emerging; 29/4 (6 overs)
Wilka Mwatile 37 (41); Jemma Botha 2/9 (2 overs)		Miane Smit 12* (11); Kayleen Green 3/6 (2 overs)

Namibia won by 1 run (DLS method)
Achimota Oval A, Accra
Umpires: Iknow Chabi (Zim) and Adil Kassam (Tan)
Player of the match: Kayleen Green (Nam)

- South Africa Emerging won the toss and elected to field.
- No further play was possible due to rain.

8 March 2024
09:00
Scorecard

Tanzania; 66 (18.3 overs)	v	South Africa Emerging; 67/2 (10.2 overs)
Tabu Omary 9 (10); Nondumiso Shangase 5/13 (3.3 overs)		Faye Tunnicliffe 29* (27); Aisha Mohamed 1/12 (2.2 overs)

South Africa Emerging won by 8 wickets
Achimota Oval A, Accra
Umpires: Habib Enesi (Nga) and Percival Sizara (Zim)
Player of the match: Nondumiso Shangase (SA)

- Tanzania won the toss and elected to bat.

10 March 2024
09:30
Scorecard

Nigeria; 74 (18.4 overs)	v	South Africa Emerging; 78/6 (14.5 overs)
Favour Eseigbe 17 (28); Seshnie Naidu 4/13 (4 overs)		Faye Tunnicliffe 45 (34); Lillian Udeh 5/18 (4 overs)

South Africa Emerging won by 4 wickets
Achimota Oval B, Accra
Umpires: Isaac Oyieko (Ken) and Percival Sizara (Zim)
Player of the match: Seshnie Naidu (SA)

- Nigeria won the toss and elected to bat.

Semi-finals

11 March 2024
09:30
Scorecard

South Africa Emerging; 122/4 (20 overs)	v	Uganda; 72 (18.4 overs)
Nondumiso Shangase 38 (42); Concy Aweko 2/27 (4 overs)		Esther Iloku 19 (33); Kayla Reyneke 3/13 (4 overs)

South Africa won by 50 runs
Achimota Oval A, Accra
Umpires: Sarah Dambanevana (Zim) and Adil Kassam (Tan)
Player of the match: Nondumiso Shangase (SA)

- Uganda won the toss and elected to field.

Gold medal match

13 March 2024
13:50
Scorecard

Zimbabwe; 112/5 (20 overs)	v	South Africa Emerging; 112/8 (20 overs)
Modester Mupachikwa 31 (49); Nondumiso Shangase 1/9 (2 overs)		Miane Smit 31* (32); Kelis Ndhlovu 2/21 (3 overs)

Match tied (Zimbabwe won the Super Over)
Achimota Oval A, Accra
Umpires: Patric Makumbi (Uga) and Isaac Oyieko (Ken)
Player of the match: Kelis Ndhlovu (Zim)

- South Africa Emerging won the toss and elected to field.
- Super Over: South Africa 2/2, Zimbabwe 4/0.

== Judo ==
8 athletes were scheduled to compete in athletes.

== Swimming ==
=== Men ===
Team roster

The squad was announced on 12 February 2024.

- Muhammed Adam
- Matthew Caldwell
- Cameron Casali
- Jarden Eaton
- Clayton Jimmie
- Owethu Mahan
- Tumelo Mahan
- Helgaard Muller
- Kaydn Naidoo
- Jonah Pool-Jones
- Andrew Ross
- Petrus Truter
- Liam Vehni

=== Women ===
Team roster

The squad was announced on 12 February 2024.

- Caitlin de Lange
- Georgia Els
- Taylor Jonker
- Leigh McMorran
- Kate Meyer
- Simone Moll
- Hannah Mouton
- Tasnim Nabbie
- Tamzyn Robson
- Catherine van Rensburg
