= Mauritius at the 2023 African Games =

- Flag of Mauritius
- IOC code: MRI
- NOC: Mauritius Olympic Committee

in Accra, Ghana 8 March 2024 – 23 March 2024
- Competitors: 74 in 13 sports
- Medals Ranked 9th: Gold 9 Silver 5 Bronze 11 Total 25

African Games appearances (overview)
- 1987; 1991; 1995; 1999; 2003; 2007; 2011; 2015; 2019; 2023

Mauritius competed at the 2023 African Games held from 8 to 23 March 2024 in Accra, Ghana. Mauritius competed in 13 sports.

== Medal table ==
Medal	Name	Sport	Event	Date
Gold	Alexandre Mayer	Cycling	Men's road race	10 March
Gold	Anishta Teeluck	Swimming	Women's 200 metre backstroke	10 March
Gold	Sheridane Pasnin	Weightlifting	Women's 49 kg snatch	10 March
Gold	Ketty Lent	Weightlifting	Women's 76 kg total	13 March
Gold	Ketty Lent	Weightlifting	Women's 76 kg snatch	13 March
Gold	Ketty Lent	Weightlifting	Women's 76 kg clean & jerk	13 March
Gold	Aurélie Halbwachs	Cycling	Women's individual time trial elite	15 March
Gold	Alexandre Mayer; Aurelien de Comarmond; Christopher Lagane; Lucie de Marigny-Lagesse; Aurélie Halbwachs; Raphaëlle Lamusse	Cycling	Mixed relay 50 kilometres	16 March
Gold	Sheldon Yan Too Sang	Taekwondo	Men's under 40	22 March
Silver	Aurélie Halbwachs	Cycling	Women's road race	9 March
Silver	Aurélien de Comarmond	Cycling	Men's road race U23	10 March
Silver	Emile Willem Gwendal	Weightlifting	Men's 55 kg snatch	10 March
Silver	Aurélien de Comarmond	Cycling	Men's U23	12 March
Silver	Priscilla Morand	Judo	Women's −48 kg	12 March
Bronze	Julien Paul; Kate Ludik	Badminton	Mixed doubles	10 March
Bronze	Aurélien de Comarmond	Cycling	Men's elites	12 March
Bronze	Sephora Lent	Weightlifting	Women's 64 kg snatch	12 March
Bronze	Alexandre Mayer; Christopher Lagane; Aurélien de Comarmond; Hanson Matombe	Cycling	Men's team time trial	14 March
Bronze	Lucie de Marigny-Lagesse; Aurélie Halbwachs; Raphaëlle Lamusse	Cycling	Women's team time trial	14 March
Bronze	Khelwin Juboo	Weightlifting	Men's 109 kg total	14 March
Bronze	Khelwin Juboo	Weightlifting	Men's 109 kg snatch	14 March
Bronze	Khelwin Juboo	Weightlifting	Men's 109 kg clean & jerk	14 March
Bronze	Abel Thesee	Arm wrestling	Men's left arm 100 kg	15 March
Bronze	Aurélien de Comarmond	Cycling	Men's individual time trial U23	15 March
Bronze	Fabrice Valerie	Boxing	Men's 51 kg	22 March
