= Field hockey at the 2023 African Games – Women's tournament =

Women's field hockey at the 2023 African Games
Tournament details
- Host country: Ghana
- City: Accra
- Dates: 15 March 2024–22 March 2024
- Teams: 3 (from 1 confederation)
- Venue: Theodosia Okoh Hockey Stadium

Final positions
- Champions: Ghana (1st title)
- Runner-up: Nigeria
- Third place: Kenya

Tournament statistics
- Matches played: 3
- Goals scored: 7 (2.33 per match)
- Top scorer(s): (Ghana) Elizabeth Opoku (Ghana) Mavis Berko (2 goals)

Field Hockey will be among the sports at the 13th Africa Games to held in 8 to 23 March 2023 in Accra, Ghana. The play will feature both a women's tournament.

== Competition schedule ==
In the preliminary round, games will be played on two pitches.

| G | Group stage | F | Final |

| Sun 17 | Mon 18 | Tue 19 | Wed 20 | Thu 21 | Fri 22 |
|---|---|---|---|---|---|
| G | G | | G | | F |

== Participating nations ==
4 teams were scheduled to compete in field hockey.

Ghana

The squad was announced on 14 March 2024.

Head coach: Osei Boakye-Yiadom

4. Ernestina Coffie
5. Hagiet Copson
6. Nafisatu Umaru
7. Adizatu Sulemana
8. Cecilia Amoako
10. Elizabeth Opoku (C)
11. Lydia Afriyie
12. Regina Mensah
13. Juwaila Acquah
14. Mavis Berko
15. Margaret Owusuaa
17. Vivian Narkuor
18. Abigail Boye (GK)
19. Racheal Bamfo
26. Doris Antwi
28. Mercy Ackon
33. Mavis Ampem-Darkoa (GK)
34. Adwoa Amoah
Kenya

Head coach: Jane Nyamogo

1. Quinter Okore (GK)
2. Diana Bariti
3. Gaudencia Ochieng
4. Vivian Onyango
5. Caroline Guchu
6. Lynne Kipsang (C)
7. Racheal Njogu
8. Maurine Sumbwa
9. Leah Omwandho
10. Naom Kemunto
12. Beverlyne Akoth
13. Grace Bwire
14. Maurine Oduor
16. Alice Wanjiku
17. Flavia Mutiva
19. Maureen Okumu
20. Nichole Odhiambo
21. Eleanor Chebet
Nigeria

The squad was announced on 12 March 2024.

Head coach:Baba Ndana

1. Martha Uko (GK)
2. Alfa John (C)
3. Hannah Hossanah
4. Iveren Ajekwe
5. Morufat Adeyemi
6. Joy Christopher
7. Faith Obukowho
8. Precious Irimiya
9. QueenEsther Njoku
10. Comfort Saturday
11. Esther Chukwu
12. Aghalelosa Jerry
13. Benedicta Johnson
14. Mary Danboyi
15. Damilola Ogunmakinju
16. Esther Billo
17. Osarugue Umweni
18. Aisha Adamu (GK)
~~South Africa~~

== Group stage ==
All times are local (UTC)

The pools were announced on 22 February 2024.

| Pos | Team | Pld | W | D | L | GF | GA | GD | Pts | Qualification |
|---|---|---|---|---|---|---|---|---|---|---|
| 1 | Ghana (H) | 2 | 2 | 0 | 0 | 5 | 1 | +4 | 6 | Final |
| 2 | Nigeria | 2 | 1 | 0 | 1 | 1 | 1 | 0 | 3 | Final |
| 3 | Kenya | 2 | 0 | 0 | 2 | 1 | 5 | −4 | 0 | |

Source: FIH
Rules for classification: 1) points; 2) matches won; 3) goal difference; 4) goals for; 5) head-to-head result; 6) field goals scored.
(H) Hosts

17 March 2024
10:00

| Kenya | 1–4 | Ghana |
|---|---|---|
| Onyango 56' | Report | Opoku 9', 33'; Berko 19'; Narkuor 27' |

Umpires:
Kamile Mockaitytė (LTU)
Charity Onosimuan (NGR)

18 March 2024
14:00

| Nigeria | 0–1 | Ghana |
|---|---|---|
| | Report | Berko 19' |

Umpires:
Kamile Mockaitytė (LTU)
Haroon Rashid (PAK)

20 March 2024
10:00

| Nigeria | 1–0 | Kenya |
|---|---|---|
| Njoku 60' | Report |

Umpires:
Kamile Mockaitytė (LTU)
Evelyn Fiador (GHA)

=== Final ===
22 March 2024
13:30

| Ghana | 0–0 | Nigeria |
|---|---|---|
| | Report |
Penalties
| Opoku (penalty shoot-out scored); Umaru (penalty shoot-out scored); Amoako (penalty shoot-out scored); Bamfo (penalty shoot-out missed); Owusuwaa (penalty shoot-out missed); Umaru (penalty shoot-out missed); Opoku (penalty shoot-out missed); Amoako (penalty shoot-out scored) | 4–3 | (penalty shoot-out scored) Johnson; (penalty shoot-out missed) Jerry; (penalty shoot-out scored) Christopher; (penalty shoot-out scored) Saturday; (penalty shoot-out missed) Billo; (penalty shoot-out missed) Christopher; (penalty shoot-out missed) Johnson; (penalty shoot-out missed) Jerry |

Umpires:
Kamile Mockaitytė (LTU)
Haroon Rashid (PAK)

== Statistics ==
=== Final standings ===
| Pos | Team |
|---|---|
| 1st place, gold medalist(s) | Ghana (H) |
| 3rd place, bronze medalist(s) | Nigeria |
| 2nd place, silver medalist(s) | Kenya |

Source: FIH
(H) Host

=== Goalscorers ===
There were 7 goals scored in 4 matches, for an average of 1.75 goals per match.

2 goals

- (Ghana) Mavis Berko
- (Ghana) Elizabeth Opoku

1 goal

- (Ghana) Vivian Narkuor
- (Kenya) Vivian Onyango
- (Nigeria) QueenEsther Njoku

Source: FIH
