= Mali at the 2023 African Games =

- Flag of Mali
- IOC code: MLI
- NOC: National Olympic and Sports Committee of Mali

in Accra, Ghana 8 March 2024 – 23 March 2024
- Medals Ranked 25th: Gold 1 Silver 1 Bronze 5 Total 7

African Games appearances
- 1965; 1973; 1978; 1987–1991; 1995; 1999; 2003; 2007; 2011; 2015; 2019; 2023

Mali competed at the 2023 African Games held from 8 to 23 March 2024 in Accra, Ghana. Mali competed in 7 sports.

== Medal table ==
Medal	Name	Sport	Event	Date
Silver	Boubacar Diallo	Athletics	Men's pole vault	21 March
Bronze	Siriman Ballo	Taekwondo	Men's −54 kg	17 March
Bronze	Maimouna Konate	Taekwondo	Women's −57 kg	18 March
Bronze	Fanta Traore	Taekwondo	Women's −67 kg	19 March
Bronze	Youssouf Simpara	Taekwondo	Men's −58 kg	20 March
Bronze	Ismaël Coulibaly	Taekwondo	Men's −80 kg	20 March
