= Zambia at the 2023 African Games =

- Flag of Zambia
- IOC code: ZAM
- NOC: National Olympic Committee of Zambia

in Accra, Ghana 8 March 2024 – 23 March 2024
- Competitors: 44 in 13 sports
- Medals Ranked 14th: Gold 4 Silver 5 Bronze 5 Total 14

African Games appearances (overview)
- 1965; 1973; 1978; 1987; 1991; 1995; 1999; 2003; 2007; 2011; 2015; 2019; 2023

Zambia competed at the 2023 African Games held from 8 to 23 March 2024 in Accra, Ghana. Zambia competed in 13 sports.

== Medal summary ==
=== Medal table ===
Medal	Name	Sport	Event	Date
Gold	Steven Mungandu	Judo	Men's −66 kg	12 March
Gold	Patrick Nyambe; Kennedy Luchembe; David Mulenga; Muzala Samukonga	Athletics	Men's 4 × 400 m relay	22 March
Gold	Patrick Chinyemba	Boxing	Men's −51 kg	22 March
Gold	Gerald Kabinda	Boxing	Men's −67 kg	22 March
Silver	Muzala Samukonga	Athletics	Men's 400 m	20 March
Silver	Mingilishi Niddy; Quincy Malekani; Sepiso Abygirl; Rhoda Njobvu	Athletics	Women's 4 × 400 m relay	22 March
Silver	Andrew Chilata	Boxing	Men's −60 kg	22 March
Silver	Mwengo Mwale	Boxing	Men's −54 kg	22 March
Silver	Emmanuel Katema	Boxing	Men's −63.5 kg	22 March
Bronze	Mia Phiri	Swimming	Women's 50 metre backstroke	11 March
Bronze	Simon Zulu	Judo	Men's −60 kg	12 March
Bronze	Mia Phiri	Swimming	Women's 50 metre freestyle	13 March
Bronze	Margret Tembo	Boxing	Women's −48 kg	20 March
Bronze	Albert Ngulube	Boxing	Men's −57 kg	20 March

Medals by sport
Sport	1st place, gold medalist(s)	2nd place, silver medalist(s)	3rd place, bronze medalist(s)	Total
Athletics	1	2	0	3
Boxing	2	3	2	7
Judo	1	0	1	2
Swimming	0	0	2	2
Total	4	5	5	14

Medals by date
Day	Date	1st place, gold medalist(s)	2nd place, silver medalist(s)	3rd place, bronze medalist(s)	Total
8	11 March	0	0	1	1
9	12 March	1	0	1	2
10	13 March	0	0	1	1
17	20 March	0	1	2	3
19	22 March	3	4	0	7
Total		4	5	5	14

Medals by gender
Gender	1st place, gold medalist(s)	2nd place, silver medalist(s)	3rd place, bronze medalist(s)	Total
Male	4	4	2	10
Female	0	1	3	4
Mixed	0	0	0	0
Total	4	5	5	14
