= Benin at the 2023 African Games =

- Flag of Benin
- IOC code: BEN
- NOC: Benin National Olympic and Sports Committee

in Accra, Ghana 8 March 2024 – 23 March 2024
- Medals Ranked 19th: Gold 3 Silver 0 Bronze 0 Total 3

African Games appearances
- 1965; 1973; 1978–1995; 1999; 2003; 2007; 2011; 2015; 2019; 2023

Benin competed at the 2023 African Games held from 8 to 23 March 2024 in Accra, Ghana.

== Medal table ==
Medal	Name	Sport	Event	Date
Gold	Marie Rose Lalèyè	Arm wrestling	Women's left arm 65 kg	15 March
Gold	Marie Rose Lalèyè	Arm wrestling	Women's right arm 65 kg	16 March
Gold	Odile Ahouanwanou	Athletics	Women's heptathlon	21 March
