= Burkina Faso at the 2023 African Games =

- Flag of Burkina Faso
- IOC code: BUR
- NOC: Burkinabé National Olympic and Sports Committee

in Accra, Ghana 8 March 2024 – 23 March 2024
- Competitors: 150 in 15 sports
- Medals Ranked 24th: Gold 1 Silver 1 Bronze 7 Total 9

African Games appearances
- 1965; 1973; 1978; 1987; 1991; 1995; 1999; 2003; 2007; 2011; 2015; 2019; 2023

Burkina Faso competed at the 2023 African Games held from 8 to 23 March 2024 in Accra, Ghana. Burkina Faso competed in 15 sports.

== Medal table ==
Medal	Name	Sport	Event	Date
Gold	Hugues Fabrice Zango	Athletics	Men's triple jump	20 March
Silver	Marthe Koala	Athletics	Women's long jump	21 March
Bronze	Allan Sanou; Marc Sanou; Samuel Sanou	Karate	Men's kata team	7 March
Bronze	Daouda Kader Traoré	Karate	Men's kumite −84 kg	7 March
Bronze	Salmantou Coulibaly	Wrestling	Women's freestyle 62 kg	10 March
Bronze	Ibrahim Maiga	Taekwondo	Men's −68 kg	18 March
Bronze	Yacouba Loue	Athletics	Men's triple jump	20 March
Bronze	Sita Sibiri	Athletics	Women's 400 metres	20 March
Bronze	Faysal Sawadogo	Taekwondo	Men's −80 kg	20 March
