= Togo at the 2023 African Games =

- Flag of Togo
- IOC code: TOG
- NOC: Togolese National Olympic Committee

in Accra, Ghana 8 March 2024 – 23 March 2024
- Competitors: 69 in 10 sports
- Medals Ranked 34th: Gold 0 Silver 1 Bronze 3 Total 4

African Games appearances (overview)
- 1965; 1973; 1978; 1987–1995; 1999; 2003; 2007; 2011; 2015; 2019; 2023

Togo competed at the 2023 African Games held from 8 to 23 March 2024 in Accra, Ghana. Togo competed in 10 sports.

== Medal table ==
Medal	Name	Sport	Event	Date
Silver	Kevin Kuadjovi	Boxing	Men's 92 kg	22 March
Bronze	Teteh Jeannot Ocloo	Arm wrestling	Men's left arm +100 kg	15 March
Bronze	Wassoumanou N'Bamba	Arm wrestling	Men's right arm 100 kg	16 March
Bronze	Teteh Jeannot Ocloo	Arm wrestling	Men's right arm +100 kg	16 March
