= 2023 African Games =

Multi-sport event in Accra, Ghana

XIII African Games
- Host city: Accra
- Nations: 53
- Athletes: 2,644
- Events: 335
- Opening: 8 March 2024
- Closing: 23 March 2024
- Opened by: Nana Akufo-Addo (President of Ghana)
- Closed by: Mustapha Ussif; Minister for Youth and Sports of Ghana
- Torch lighter: Benjamin Azamati
- Main venue: Legon Sports Stadium
- Website: Accra2023ag.com

The 13th African Games, also known as Accra 2023, were hosted by Ghana from 8–23 March 2024. Despite having Accra as the main host city, the games were held in two sub-host cities: Kumasi and Cape Coast. The games were initially planned to be held in August 2023, however a failure to complete facilities on time and arguments over marketing revenue resulted in the games being delayed to March 2024.

== Bids ==
- Accra, Ghana (selected)
- Abuja, Nigeria
- Ouagadougou, Burkina Faso

Ghana won the rights to host the event in October 2018. In November 2021, Ghana signed an agreement with the African Union to host the event.

== Venues ==
Plans to build a new stadium for the event were cancelled due to the COVID-19 pandemic.

The new Borteyman Sports Complex located in Borteyman, Accra is intended to be used for indoor sports.

Below are some venues to host the 2023 All African Games

Venue	Events	Capacity	Status
Accra Sports Stadium	Football ()	40,000	Existing
Borteyman Sports Complex	Swimming ()	500	Commissioned
Borteyman Sports Complex	Handball (); Wrestling ()	500	Commissioned
Borteyman Sports Complex	Badminton (); Volleyball ()	1,000	Commissioned
Borteyman Sports Complex	Tennis ()	1,000	Commissioned
Theodosia Okoh Hockey Stadium	Field hockey ()		Existing
Achimota Oval	Cricket ()		Existing
University of Ghana Sports Facilities	Athletics (); Rugby sevens (); Weightlifting ()		Renovation
Ga-Mashiae Hall	Judo (); Karate (); Taekwondo ()		Existing
Bukom Boxing Arena	Boxing ()	4000	Existing

== Marketing ==
The mascot, the logo and the website of the event were unveiled in December 2021.

The mascot, known as Ɔkɔdeɛ (come on), is an anthropomorphic eagle wearing the Ghanaian Flag.

== Participating nations ==
From the 54 members of the ANOCA. 53 sent delegations to compete in the event, the only exception was Cape Verde. Also noteworthy was the presence of a delegation from the African Judo Union. This happened because the National Sports Federation in Angola was suspended and the country's athletes competed as neutrals in the sport. However, their 3 medals are added to the Angolan delegation in the final table.

Participating National Olympic Committees
- Algeria (222)
- Angola (110)
- Benin (109)
- Botswana (65)
- Burkina Faso (129)
- Burundi (24)
- Cameroon (65)
- Central African Republic (25)
- Chad (29)
- Republic of the Congo (77)
- Comoros (10)
- Ivory Coast (50)
- Djibouti (13)
- Democratic Republic of the Congo (137)
- Egypt (284)
- Equatorial Guinea (33)
- Eritrea (33)
- Eswatini (13)
- Ethiopia (161)
- Gabon (36)
- The Gambia (68)
- Ghana (414) (Host)
- Guinea (20)
- Guinea-Bissau (5)
- Kenya (219)
- Lesotho (9)
- Liberia (20)
- Libya (14)
- Madagascar (65)
- Malawi (10)
- Mali (84)
- Mauritania (10)
- Mauritius (77)
- Morocco (81)
- Mozambique (32)
- Namibia (89)
- Niger (28)
- Nigeria (350)
- Rwanda (44)
- São Tomé and Príncipe (7)
- Senegal (104)
- Seychelles (48)
- Sierra Leone (48)
- Somalia (1)
- South Africa (189)
- South Sudan (29)
- Sudan (7)
- Tanzania (77)
- Togo (62)
- Tunisia (136)
- Uganda (217)
- Zambia (73)
- Zimbabwe (89)

== Sports ==
Squash was expected to feature at the 13th African Games. But, when the final list of events, they were cut from the games program. In February 2022, it was announced that cricket and arm wrestling will make its debut in the 2023 edition of the games. Rugby union (sevens) is also set to make its debut. A total of 23 sports games have been confirmed for the continental event.

- Arm wrestling
- Athletics
- Badminton
- 3x3 basketball
- Boxing
- Chess
- Cricket (2)
- Cycling
- Field hockey (2)
- Football (2)
- Handball
- Judo
- Karate
- Rugby sevens
- Swimming
- Table tennis
- Taekwondo
- Tennis
- Triathlon
- Volleyball
  - Beach volleyball
- Weightlifting
- Wrestling

Demonstration sports:

- Esports
- Mixed martial arts
- Pickleball
- Teqball
- ''Scrabble''
- Speed-ball
- Sambo

== Calendar ==
The schedule for the Games was as follows.

OC	Opening ceremony	●	Event competitions	1	Gold medal events	CC	Closing ceremony

March	4th Mon	5th Tue	6th Wed	7th Thu	8th Fri	9th Sat	10th Sun	11th Mon	12th Tue	13th Wed	14th Thu	15th Fri	16th Sat	17th Sun	18th Mon	19th Tue	20th Wed	21st Thu	22nd Fri	23rd Sat	Events
Ceremonies					OC															CC	
Arm wrestling												14	14								28
Athletics															3	12	11	7	14		47
Badminton				●	●	●	5														5
3x3 basketball															●	●	●	●	4		4
Beach volleyball							●	●	●	●	2										2
Boxing												●	●	●	●	●	●	●	25		25
Chess						1	2	3													6
Cricket				●	●		●	●		1				●	●		●	●		1	2
Cycling						2	2		4		2	4	1								15
Field hockey														●	●		●		2		2
Football				●	●	●	●	●	●		●	●	●		●	●		1	1		2
Handball										●	●	●	●	●	●		●	●	2		2
Judo									5	4	5	1									15
Karate				8	6	2															16
Rugby sevens																●	●	2			2
Swimming						7	9	10	8	8											42
Table tennis	●	2	●	●	2	1	2														7
Taekwondo														4	4	4	4	1	8		25
Tennis												●	●	●	●	●	●	4	●	2	6
Triathlon												2									2
Volleyball								●	●	●	●	●		●	●		●		●	2	2
Weightlifting							12	12	12	12	12										60
Wrestling						6	6	6													18
Daily medal events	0	2	0	8	8	19	38	31	29	25	21	21	15	4	7	16	15	15	56	5	335
Cumulative total	0	2	2	10	18	37	75	106	135	160	181	202	217	221	228	244	259	274	330	335	335
March	4th Mon	5th Tue	6th Wed	7th Thu	8th Fri	9th Sat	10th Sun	11th Mon	12th Tue	13th Wed	14th Thu	15th Fri	16th Sat	17th Sun	18th Mon	19th Tue	20th Wed	21st Thu	22nd Fri	23rd Sat	Events

== Medal table ==
* Host nation (Ghana)

Rank	NOC	Gold	Silver	Bronze	Total
1	Egypt	103	47	43	193
2	Nigeria	47	34	40	121
3	South Africa	32	32	42	106
4	Algeria	29	38	48	115
5	Tunisia	22	27	38	87
6	Ghana*	19	29	21	69
7	Morocco	9	12	14	35
8	Ethiopia	9	8	5	22
9	Mauritius	9	5	11	25
10	Kenya	8	8	21	37
11	Eritrea	7	2	6	15
12	Senegal	4	7	18	29
13	Uganda	4	6	10	20
14	Zambia	4	5	5	14
15	Madagascar	4	4	7	15
16	Niger	4	1	6	11
17	Cameroon	3	13	14	30
18	Zimbabwe	3	4	4	11
19	Benin	3	1	0	4
20	Democratic Republic of the Congo	2	7	9	18
21	Angola	2	1	5	8
21	Mali	2	1	5	8
23	The Gambia	2	0	0	2
24	Libya	1	11	1	13
25	Namibia	1	4	5	10
26	Burkina Faso	1	2	7	10
27	Guinea	1	1	1	3
28	South Sudan	1	0	0	1
29	Ivory Coast	0	9	9	18
30	Mozambique	0	5	1	6
31	Botswana	0	3	10	13
32	Liberia	0	2	2	4
33	Central African Republic	0	1	3	4
33	Gabon	0	1	3	4
33	Togo	0	1	3	4
36	Equatorial Guinea	0	1	0	1
36	Somalia	0	1	0	1
38	Republic of the Congo	0	0	5	5
39	Tanzania	0	0	3	3
40	Chad	0	0	1	1
40	Djibouti	0	0	1	1
40	Guinea-Bissau	0	0	1	1
40	Lesotho	0	0	1	1
40	Rwanda	0	0	1	1
Totals (44 entries)		336	334	430	1,100

== African Para Games ==
In January 2022, president of the International Paralympic Committee Andrew Parsons visited Ghana in support of the 2023 African Para Games which were also to be held in Ghana.

== Demonstration Sports ==
=== MMA ===
For the first time in the history of the games, Mixed Martial Arts (MMA) was introduced as a demonstration sport in the African Games. The event was conducted by Global Association Of Mixed Martial Arts (GAMMA). MMA athletes from all over the continent came to participate. Over a span of 2 days (11 and 12 March 2024) nearly 50 fights were conducted to finally crown the African Games Champions in their respective weight classes.

The 2023 African Games MMA tournament included athletes from Benin, Burkina Faso, Ivory Coast, Egypt, Ghana, Libya, Mauritius, Nigeria, Sudan, and Togo.

The final results of the 2023 African Games MMA tournament were announced by GAMMA on their website.

== Aftermath of the competition ==
The 2023 All African Games were without controversies; however, the major talking point after the games is the African Games Audit. The Ministry of Sports awarded 55 single-source contracts amounting to over GHS2.7 billion without justification, this is according to the Auditor-General of Ghana.

The ministry was responsible in organizing the event and providing sports facilities for the games.

== See also ==
- African Games
- 2023 Africa Cup of Nations
- 2023 African Para Games
- 2023 African Beach Games
- 2024 Summer Olympics
- 2024 Summer Paralympics
- 2024 in Ghana
