= Table tennis at the 2023 African Games – Mixed doubles =

Mixed doubles at the 2023 African Games
- Venue: Accra International Conference Centre
- Date: 9 March 2024

Medalists
gold medal	Youssef Abdel-Aziz; Mariam Al-Hodaby	Egypt
silver medal	Stéphane Ouaiche; Lucie Mobarek	Algeria
bronze medal	Mohamed El-Beiali; Marwa Al-Hodaby	Egypt
bronze medal	Fabio Rakotoarimanana; Hanitra Raharimanana	Madagascar

The mixed doubles table tennis event at the 2023 African Games took place on 9 March 2024 at the Accra International Conference Centre.

== Schedule ==
All times are Greenwich Mean Time (UTC+00:00)

Date	Time	Event
Saturday, 9 March 2024	10:00	Round of 64
Saturday, 9 March 2024	11:30	Round of 32
Saturday, 9 March 2024	12:30	Round of 16
Saturday, 9 March 2024	17:00	Quarterfinals
Saturday, 9 March 2024	18:00	Semifinals
Saturday, 9 March 2024	19:00	Final

== Results ==
=== Finals ===
Quarterfinals
Khalil Sta (TUN); Fadwa Garci (TUN)	7	7	5
Mohamed El-Beiali (EGY); Marwa Al-Hodaby (EGY)	11	11	11
Youssef Abdel-Aziz (EGY); Mariam Al-Hodaby (EGY)	11	11	11
Milhane Jellouli (ALG); Amina Kessaci (ALG)	3	4	6
Taiwo Mati (NGR); Fatimo Bello (NGR)	6	11	10	11	12
Fabio Rakotoarimanana (MAD); Hanitra Raharimanana (MAD)	11	4	12	6	14
Amadi Omeh (NGR); Esther Oribamise (NGR)	9	5	8
Stéphane Ouaiche (ALG); Lucie Mobarek (ALG)	11	11	11

Semifinals
Mohamed El-Beiali (EGY); Marwa Al-Hodaby (EGY)	6	5	6
Youssef Abdel-Aziz (EGY); Mariam Al-Hodaby (EGY)	11	11	11
Fabio Rakotoarimanana (MAD); Hanitra Raharimanana (MAD)	6	5	9
Stéphane Ouaiche (ALG); Lucie Mobarek (ALG)	11	11	11

Final
Youssef Abdel-Aziz (EGY); Mariam Al-Hodaby (EGY)	11	11	11
Stéphane Ouaiche (ALG); Lucie Mobarek (ALG)	5	5	3

=== Top half ===
==== Section 1 ====
Round of 64						Round of 32						Round of 16
						Olajide Omotayo (NGR); Offiong Edem (NGR)	11	11	11
Peter Muturi (KEN); Doreen Juma (KEN)	7	10	7			Bernard Sam (GHA); Celia Baah-Danso (GHA)	1	3	8
Bernard Sam (GHA); Celia Baah-Danso (GHA)	11	12	11									Olajide Omotayo (NGR); Offiong Edem (NGR)	8	11	3
Liam Beukes (RSA); Rochica Sonday (RSA)	5	11	9	11	12							Khalil Sta (TUN); Fadwa Garci (TUN)	11	13	11
Mamy Rakotoarisoa (MAD); Mahenika Andriamanantena (MAD)	11	5	11	6	14	Mamy Rakotoarisoa (MAD); Mahenika Andriamanantena (MAD)	12	4	5	11	6
						Khalil Sta (TUN); Fadwa Garci (TUN)	10	11	11	6	11

==== Section 2 ====
Round of 64
Mohamed El-Beiali (EGY); Marwa Al-Hodaby (EGY)	11	11	11
Choolwe Hamalambo (ZAM); Mubanga Kunda (ZAM)	5	5	7
Darara Mokonen Dufera (ETH); Feven Tamiru Kinfu (ETH)	11	11	11
Ousseni Tapsoba (BUR); Mamounata Derra (BUR)	5	6	7
Sharif Nsereko (UGA); Shanitah Namaala (UGA)	10	11	11	5	11
Cheldon Sindani (CGO); Beria Francelle Gamago (CGO)	12	7	7	11	8

Round of 32
Mohamed El-Beiali (EGY); Marwa Al-Hodaby (EGY)	8	11	11	11
Darara Mokonen Dufera (ETH); Feven Tamiru Kinfu (ETH)	11	5	6	8
Sharif Nsereko (UGA); Shanitah Namaala (UGA)	8	2	6
Sami Kherouf (ALG); Lynda Loghraibi (ALG)	11	11	11

Round of 16
Mohamed El-Beiali (EGY); Marwa Al-Hodaby (EGY)	11	11	11
Sami Kherouf (ALG); Lynda Loghraibi (ALG)	6	5	6

==== Section 3 ====
Round of 64
Ryan Desscann (MRI); Ruqayyah Kinoo (MRI)	11	2	11	10	15
Joseph Sebatindira (UGA); Jemimah Nakawala (UGA)	6	11	4	12	17
Samuel Akayade (GHA); Eva Adom-Amankwaa (GHA)	11	11	11
Valdemar Cassanga (ANG); Nelma Moisés (ANG)	2	7	5
Abdoulaye Bangoura (GUI); Fatou Bangoura (GUI)
Matthew Kuti (NGR); Sukurat Aiyelabegan (NGR)	w/o

Round of 32
Youssef Abdel-Aziz (EGY); Mariam Al-Hodaby (EGY)	11	11	11
Joseph Sebatindira (UGA); Jemimah Nakawala (UGA)	8	4	5
Samuel Akayade (GHA); Eva Adom-Amankwaa (GHA)	7	3	7
Matthew Kuti (NGR); Sukurat Aiyelabegan (NGR)	11	11	11

Round of 16
Youssef Abdel-Aziz (EGY); Mariam Al-Hodaby (EGY)	11	11	11
Matthew Kuti (NGR); Sukurat Aiyelabegan (NGR)	6	5	6

==== Section 4 ====
Round of 64
Saheed Idowu (CGO); Thomie Mossemba (CGO)	11	11	6	11
Anaab Abduldaim (KEN); Sifa Nafula (KEN)	8	9	11	7
Arma Kamara (LBR); Loretta Davis (LBR)
Daniel Beyene (ETH); Yordanos Ngidie Dejene (ETH)	w/o
Milhane Jellouli (ALG); Amina Kessaci (ALG)	11	11	9	11
Setra Rakotoarisoa (MAD); Ranto Rakotondrazaka (MAD)	5	6	11	9

Round of 32
Saheed Idowu (CGO); Thomie Mossemba (CGO)	6	11	5	13	11
Daniel Beyene (ETH); Yordanos Ngidie Dejene (ETH)	11	7	11	11	6
Milhane Jellouli (ALG); Amina Kessaci (ALG)	11	11	11
Chetan Nathoo (RSA); Danisha Patel (RSA)	7	7	8

Round of 16
Saheed Idowu (CGO); Thomie Mossemba (CGO)	12	7	5	5
Milhane Jellouli (ALG); Amina Kessaci (ALG)	10	11	11	11

=== Bottom half ===
==== Section 5 ====
Round of 64
Charles Banda (ZAM); Latifa Nalavwe (ZAM)	4	6	2
Israel Aklie (GHA); Joanita Borteye (GHA)	11	11	11
Elizandro Andre (ANG); Ruth Tavares (ANG)	11	14	7	5	11
Luke Abrahams (RSA); Musfiquh Kalam (RSA)	3	12	11	11	8
Oba Kizito Oba (CIV); Fatou Kiabou (CIV)	9	4	5
Taiwo Mati (NGR); Fatimo Bello (NGR)	11	11	11

Round of 32
Wassim Essid (TUN); Maram Zoghlami (TUN)	10	11	11	11
Israel Aklie (GHA); Joanita Borteye (GHA)	12	9	9	7
Elizandro Andre (ANG); Ruth Tavares (ANG)	5	7	9
Taiwo Mati (NGR); Fatimo Bello (NGR)	11	11	11

Round of 16
Wassim Essid (TUN); Maram Zoghlami (TUN)	11	4	9	13
Taiwo Mati (NGR); Fatimo Bello (NGR)	6	11	11	15

==== Section 6 ====
Round of 64
Fabio Rakotoarimanana (MAD); Hanitra Raharimanana (MAD)	11	11	11
Eyob Sissay Abeje (ETH); Meron Mekuria (ETH)	7	7	6
Maret Camara (GUI); Sia Camara (GUI)
Brijack Tando (CGO); Ruth Elenghat (CGO)	w/o
Josiah Wandera (KEN); Nelly Mutuma (KEN)	11	11	11
Andy Bringaud (GAB); Ruth Mihindou (GAB)	8	3	7

Round of 32
Fabio Rakotoarimanana (MAD); Hanitra Raharimanana (MAD)	11	11	11
Brijack Tando (CGO); Ruth Elenghat (CGO)	9	5	1
Josiah Wandera (KEN); Nelly Mutuma (KEN)	3	4	4
Mehdi Bouloussa (ALG); Malissa Nasri (ALG)	11	11	11

Round of 16
Fabio Rakotoarimanana (MAD); Hanitra Raharimanana (MAD)	11	9	11	8	11
Mehdi Bouloussa (ALG); Malissa Nasri (ALG)	8	11	7	11	6

==== Section 7 ====
Round of 64
Délcio Cassule (ANG); Isabel Albino (ANG)	11	11	13
Cowen Lodewyk (RSA); Lailaa Edwards (RSA)	8	7	11
Brian Mutua (KEN); Nasimuyu Lisa (KEN)	12	6	4	5
Jonathan Senyonga (UGA); Judith Nangonzi (UGA)	10	11	11	11
Arnaud Kekessi (BUR); Habibou Derra (BUR)	3	4	6
Emmanuel Commey (GHA); Cynthia Kwabi (GHA)	11	11	11

Round of 32
Amadi Omeh (NGR); Esther Oribamise (NGR)	11	11	11
Délcio Cassule (ANG); Isabel Albino (ANG)	4	8	8
Jonathan Senyonga (UGA); Judith Nangonzi (UGA)	12	7	7	11	3
Emmanuel Commey (GHA); Cynthia Kwabi (GHA)	10	11	11	8	11

Round of 16
Amadi Omeh (NGR); Esther Oribamise (NGR)	7	11	3	13	11
Emmanuel Commey (GHA); Cynthia Kwabi (GHA)	11	6	11	11	7

==== Section 8 ====
Round of 64					Round of 32				Round of 16
					Youssef Ben Atia (TUN); Abir Haj Salah (TUN)	11	11	11
Daneil Hadsh (ETH); Fana Rezene Ftwi (ETH)	11	11	11	11	Daneil Hadsh (ETH); Fana Rezene Ftwi (ETH)	3	5	5
Régis Kiassi (CGO); Guynehe Djagana (CGO)	5	13	5	2					Youssef Ben Atia (TUN); Abir Haj Salah (TUN)	7	4	7
Stéphane Ouaiche (ALG); Lucie Mobarek (ALG)	11	11	11						Stéphane Ouaiche (ALG); Lucie Mobarek (ALG)	11	11	11
Antonio Lemos (ANG); Eugenia Esperança Simoes (ANG)	3	3	6		Stéphane Ouaiche (ALG); Lucie Mobarek (ALG)	11	11	11
					Khalid Assar (EGY); Yousra Helmy (EGY)	7	6	9
