= Table tennis at the 2023 African Games – Men's singles =

Men's singles at the 2023 African Games
- Venue: Accra International Conference Centre
- Date: 4 – 5 March 2024
- Competitors: 84 from 26 nations

Medalists
gold medal	Omar Assar	Egypt
silver medal	Quadri Aruna	Nigeria
bronze medal	Ibrahima Diaw	Senegal
bronze medal	Mohamed El-Beiali	Egypt

The men's singles table tennis event at the 2023 African Games took place from 4 to 5 March 2024 at the Accra International Conference Centre.

Olajide Omotayo was the defending champion, but lost in the quarterfinals to Omar Assar.

Assar went on to win the title, defeating Quadri Aruna in the final, 4–3.

== Schedule ==
All times are Greenwich Mean Time (UTC+00:00)

Date	Time	Event
Wednesday, 4 March 2024	9:00	Round of 128
Wednesday, 4 March 2024	10:30	Round of 64
Wednesday, 4 March 2024	16:00	Round of 32
Wednesday, 4 March 2024	18:30	Round of 16
Tuesday, 5 March 2024	10:40	Quarterfinals
Tuesday, 5 March 2024	12:40	Semifinals
Tuesday, 5 March 2024	19:40	Final

== Results ==
=== Finals ===
Quarterfinals
Quadri Aruna (NGR)	12	9	11	11	10	11
Youssef Abdel-Aziz (EGY)	10	11	7	7	12	6
Khalid Assar (EGY)	11	5	8	12	9
Mohamed El-Beiali (EGY)	9	11	11	14	11
Ibrahima Diaw (SEN)	12	11	11	11	7	11
Saheed Idowu (CGO)	14	6	9	5	11	8
Olajide Omotayo (NGR)	8	7	10	9
Omar Assar (EGY)	11	11	12	11

Semifinals
Quadri Aruna (NGR)	13	11	12	11
Mohamed El-Beiali (EGY)	11	5	10	6
Ibrahima Diaw (SEN)	8	5	11	11	7	2
Omar Assar (EGY)	11	11	9	6	11	11

Final
Quadri Aruna (NGR)	6	11	11	7	11	8	6
Omar Assar (EGY)	11	2	2	11	9	11	11

=== Top half ===
==== Section 1 ====
Round of 128
Harouna Sagna (MTN)	4	5	3
Franck Essawe (GAB)	11	11	11
El Mutasim Idris (SUD)	2	4	11	5
Samuel Akayade (GHA)	11	11	7	11

Round of 64
Quadri Aruna (NGR)	w/o
Gyslain Mbati (CAF)
Franck Essawe (GAB)	5	1	5
Elizandro Andre (ANG)	11	11	11
Exaucé Ngefuassa (COD)	6	2	3
Samuel Akayade (GHA)	11	11	11
Stéphane Ouaiche (ALG)	11	11	11
Fabio Rakotoarimanana (MAD)	7	3	9

Round of 32
Quadri Aruna (NGR)	11	11	11
Elizandro Andre (ANG)	2	1	1
Samuel Akayade (GHA)	4	5	4
Stéphane Ouaiche (ALG)	11	11	11

Round of 16
Quadri Aruna (NGR)	11	11	6	11
Stéphane Ouaiche (ALG)	6	7	11	9

==== Section 2 ====
Round of 128
Arnaud Kekessi (BUR)	4	7	5
Liam Beukes (RSA)	11	11	11
Hamidou Sow (SEN)	w/o
Cheldon Sindani (CGO)
Eyob Sissay Abeje (ETH)	w/o
Arma Kamara (LBR)

Round of 64
Youssef Abdel-Aziz (EGY)	11	11	11
Liam Beukes (RSA)	3	2	2
Hamidou Sow (SEN)	6	11	11	11
Samuel Ankunda (UGA)	11	9	9	5
Brian Mutua (KEN)	11	2	10	10
Eyob Sissay Abeje (ETH)	9	11	12	12

Round of 32
Youssef Abdel-Aziz (EGY)	11	11	11
Hamidou Sow (SEN)	2	6	5
Eyob Sissay Abeje (ETH)	5	3	4
Mehdi Bouloussa (ALG)	11	11	11

Round of 16
Youssef Abdel-Aziz (EGY)	11	11	5	6	11
Mehdi Bouloussa (ALG)	5	4	11	11	5

==== Section 3 ====
Round of 128
Peter Muturi (KEN)	w/o
Maret Camara (GUI)
Sharif Nsereko (UGA)	6	9	8
Daniel Beyene (ETH)	11	11	11
Bradford Sawyer (SLE)	7	6	2
Ben Moussa Dosso (CIV)	11	11	11

Round of 64
Taiwo Mati (NGR)	11	11	11
Tresor Ndong (GAB)	6	8	7
Peter Muturi (KEN)	6	6	7
Khalid Assar (EGY)	11	11	11
Youssef Ben Attia (TUN)	11	11	11
Daniel Beyene (ETH)	5	6	2
Ben Moussa Dosso (CIV)	11	8	15	11
Chetan Nathoo (RSA)	4	11	13	4

Round of 32
Taiwo Mati (NGR)	11	8	7	11	9
Khalid Assar (EGY)	4	11	11	9	11
Youssef Ben Attia (TUN)	11	11	13
Ben Moussa Dosso (CIV)	1	8	11

Round of 16
Khalid Assar (EGY)	11	11	11
Youssef Ben Attia (TUN)	3	5	6

==== Section 4 ====
Round of 128
Roberto Fabiano (ANG)	6	10	10
Awraris Zerihun (ETH)	11	12	12
Matthew Kuti (NGR)	11	11	12
Israel Aklie (GHA)	6	6	10
Regis Kiassi (CGO)
Bella Maheidine (ALG)	w/o

Round of 64
Oba Kizito Oba (CIV)	11	11	11
Awraris Zerihun (ETH)	3	6	9
Matthew Kuti (NGR)	11	5	7	11
Bella Maheidine (ALG)	7	11	11	13
Gedeon Kassa (COD)	11	8	11	11
Charles Banda (ZAM)	7	11	6	4
Youssef Ahmed (MTN)
Mohamed El-Beiali (EGY)	w/o

Round of 32
Oba Kizito Oba (CIV)	7	11	12	6	7
Bella Maheidine (ALG)	11	8	10	11	11
Gedeon Kassa (COD)	2	3	5
Mohamed El-Beiali (EGY)	11	11	11

Round of 16
Bella Maheidine (ALG)	6	3	9
Mohamed El-Beiali (EGY)	11	11	11

=== Bottom half ===
==== Section 5 ====
Round of 128
Cowen Lodewyk (RSA)	5	7	11	11	14
Valdemar Cassanga (ANG)	11	11	5	6	16
Anaab Abduldaim (KEN)	5	10	15	9
Mohammed Adam (SUD)	11	12	13	11

Round of 64
Ibrahima Diaw (SEN)	11	11	11
Andy Bringaud (GAB)	1	4	7
Valdemar Cassanga (ANG)	7	11	12	6
Habeb al-Ajaebi (LBA)	11	13	10	11
Milhane Jellouli (ALG)	11	11	11
Mohammed Adam (SUD)	3	5	4
Bernard Sam (GHA)	2	5	4
Mohamed Shouman (EGY)	11	11	11

Round of 32
Ibrahima Diaw (SEN)	11	11	11
Habeb al-Ajaebi (LBA)	1	3	8
Milhane Jellouli (ALG)	14	9	11	7
Mohamed Shouman (EGY)	16	11	9	11

Round of 16
Ibrahima Diaw (SEN)	10	11	11	11
Mohamed Shouman (EGY)	12	8	6	8

==== Section 6 ====
Round of 128
Daneil Hadsh (ETH)	2	9	1
Mamy Rakotoarisoa (MAD)	11	11	11
Setra Rakotoarisoa (MAD)	w/o
Teddy Ingamoyen (CAF)
Emmanuel Commey (GHA)	11	11	10	11
Joseph Sebatindira (UGA)	3	8	12	3

Round of 64
Amadi Omeh (NGR)	11	11	7	11
Mamy Rakotoarisoa (MAD)	3	7	11	7
Setra Rakotoarisoa (MAD)	9	11	9	11	5
Wassim Essid (TUN)	11	6	11	9	11
Bertin Mingashanga (COD)	2	8	15	1
Emmanuel Commey (GHA)	11	11	13	11
Antonio Lemos (ANG)	7	5	10
Saheed Idowu (CGO)	11	11	12

Round of 32
Amadi Omeh (NGR)	11	8	5	5
Wassim Essid (TUN)	6	11	11	11
Emmanuel Commey (GHA)	5	7	4
Saheed Idowu (CGO)	11	11	11

Round of 16
Wassim Essid (TUN)	6	9	9
Saheed Idowu (CGO)	11	11	11

==== Section 7 ====
Round of 128
Ryan Desscann (MRI)	5	11	11	11
Ousseni Tapsoba (BUR)	11	7	6	6
Bogton Pyee (LBR)
Ernest Quarcoo (GHA)	w/o
Mohamed Nadir (SUD)	11	5	11	11
Choolwe Hamalambo (ZAM)	9	11	5	5

Round of 64
Olajide Omotayo (NGR)	11	11	11
Délcio Cassule (ANG)	5	8	6
Ryan Desscann (MRI)	7	7	9
Darara Dufera (ETH)	11	11	11
Khalil Sta (TUN)	9	11	12	11
Ernest Quarcoo (GHA)	11	2	10	3
Mohamed Nadir (SUD)	11	10	5	11	3
Luke Abrahams (RSA)	4	12	11	8	11

Round of 32
Olajide Omotayo (NGR)	11	11	11
Darara Dufera (ETH)	9	5	1
Khalil Sta (TUN)	9	11	11	11
Luke Abrahams (RSA)	11	6	7	7

Round of 16
Olajide Omotayo (NGR)	11	11	11
Khalil Sta (TUN)	3	3	8

==== Section 8 ====
Round of 128
Jonathan Senyonga (UGA)	11	11	11
Emmanuel Koroma (SLE)	8	6	4
Jean-Pierre Bayala (CIV)	11	11	11
El Hacen Ahmed (MTN)	1	2	2

Round of 64
Sami Kherouf (ALG)	11	11	11
Jonathan Senyonga (UGA)	4	6	4
Jean-Pierre Bayala (CIV)	11	9	11	6	5
Christian Mbongia (COD)	4	11	5	11	11
Josiah Wandera (KEN)	w/o
Abdoulaye Bangoura (GUI)
Brijack Tando (CGO)
Omar Assar (EGY)	w/o

Round of 32
Sami Kherouf (ALG)	11	11	11
Christian Mbongia (COD)	7	3	6
Josiah Wandera (KEN)	2	1	4
Omar Assar (EGY)	11	11	11

Round of 16
Sami Kherouf (ALG)	2	9	10
Omar Assar (EGY)	11	11	12
