= Table tennis at the 2023 African Games – Men's team =

Men's team at the 2023 African Games
- Venue: Accra International Conference Centre
- Date: 6 − 8 March 2024

Medalists
gold medal	Youssef Abdel-Aziz; Omar Assar; Khalid Assar; Mohamed El-Beiali; Mohamed Shouman	Egypt
silver medal	Quadri Aruna; Matthew Kuti; Taiwo Mati; Amadi Omeh; Olajide Omotayo	Nigeria
bronze medal	Maheidine Bella; Mehdi Bouloussa; Milhane Jellouli; Sami Kherouf; Stéphane Ouaiche	Algeria
bronze medal	Youssef Ben Attia; Wassim Essid; Khalil Sta	Tunisia

The men's team table tennis event at the 2023 African Games took place from 6 to 8 March 2024 at the Accra International Conference Centre.

== Schedule ==
All times are Greenwich Mean Time (UTC+00:00)

Date	Time	Event
Wednesday, 6 March 2024	10:00	Group stage
Wednesday, 6 March 2024	18:00	Round of 16
Thursday, 7 March 2024	10:00	Quarterfinals
Thursday, 7 March 2024	18:30	Semifinals
Friday, 8 March 2024	11:00	Final

== Results ==
All times are Greenwich Mean Time (UTC+00:00)

=== Group stage ===
==== Group 1 ====
Pos	Team	Pld	W	L	SF	SA	SR	Pts	Qualification
1	Egypt	2	2	0	6	0	—	4	Round of 16
2	Ethiopia	2	1	1	3	4	0.750	3	Round of 16
3	Gabon	2	0	2	1	6	0.167	2	

Source: International Table Tennis Federation

6 March 2024; 10:00	Egypt	3–0	Gabon

	Individual matches
Youssef Abdel-Aziz	3–0	Trésor Ndong Ndoutoume	11–2, 11–4, 11–3
Mohamed El-Beiali	3–0	Franck Essawe Ambourouet	11–1, 11–3, 11–3
Khalid Assar	3–0	Andy Bringaud	11–3, 11–4, 11–4

6 March 2024; 12:00	Ethiopia	0–3	Egypt

	Individual matches
Darara Mokonen Dufera	0–3	Youssef Abdel-Aziz	2–11, 4–11, 3–11
Eyob Sissay Abeje	0–3	Mohamed El-Beiali	6–11, 5–11, 8–11
Daneil Hadsh	0–3	Khalid Assar	3–11, 4–11, 4–11

6 March 2024; 16:00	Gabon	1–3	Ethiopia

	Individual matches
Trésor Ndong Ndoutoume	3–2	Daniel Beyene	3–11, 5–11, 15–13, 11–8, 11–8
Andy Bringaud	1–3	Darara Mokonen Dufera	4–11, 6–11, 11–3, 4–11
Franck Essawe Ambourouet	0–3	Eyob Sissay Abeje	3–11, 5–11, 6–11
Trésor Ndong Ndoutoume	0–3	Darara Mokonen Dufera	2–11, 2–11, 7–11

==== Group 2 ====
Pos	Team	Pld	W	L	SF	SA	SR	Pts	Qualification
1	Nigeria	2	2	0	6	0	—	4	Round of 16
2	Democratic Republic of the Congo	2	1	1	3	3	1.000	3	Round of 16
3	Mauritania	2	0	2	0	6	0.000	2	

Source: International Table Tennis Federation

6 March 2024; 10:00	Nigeria	3–0	Mauritania

	Individual matches
Taiwo Mati	3–0	El Hacen Ahmed	11–1, 11–1, 11–3
Matthew Kuti	3–0	Haruna Sagna	11–1, 11–3, 11–3
Amadi Omeh	3–0	Youssef Ahmed	11–3, 11–4, 11–2

6 March 2024; 12:00	Nigeria	3–0	Democratic Republic of the Congo

	Individual matches
Taiwo Mati	3–0	Christian Mbongia	11–2, 11–7, 11–7
Matthew Kuti	3–0	Gedeon Kassa	11–7, 11–3, 11–5
Amadi Omeh	3–0	Bertin Mingashanga	11–7, 11–7, 11–9

6 March 2024; 16:00	Democratic Republic of the Congo	3–0	Mauritania

	Individual matches
Christian Mbongia	3–0	Haruna Sagna	11–1, 11–4, 11–3
Bertin Mingashanga	3–0	El Hacen Ahmed	11–4, 11–4, 11–1
Exauce Ngefuassa	3–0	Youssef Ahmed	11–2, 11–4, 11–3

==== Group 3 ====
Pos	Team	Pld	W	L	SF	SA	SR	Pts	Qualification
1	Algeria	2	2	0	6	0	—	4	Round of 16
2	Angola	2	1	1	3	3	1.000	3	Round of 16
3	Guinea	2	0	2	0	6	0.000	2	

Source: International Table Tennis Federation

6 March 2024; 10:00	Algeria	3–0	Guinea

	Individual matches
Maheidine Bella	3–0	Maret Camara	w/o
Sami Kherouf	3–0	Abdoulaye Bangoura	w/o
Milhane Jellouli	3–0	Sekou Ahmed Conté	w/o

6 March 2024; 12:00	Angola	0–3	Algeria

	Individual matches
Antonio Lemos	0–3	Stéphane Ouaiche	5–11, 5–11, 6–11
Délcio Cassule	0–3	Mehdi Bouloussa	3–11, 5–11, 3–11
Elizandro Andre	0–3	Sami Kherouf	4–11, 5–11, 5–11

6 March 2024; 16:00	Angola	3–0	Guinea

	Individual matches
Elizandro Andre	3–0	Maret Camara	w/o
Délcio Cassule	3–0	Abdoulaye Bangoura	w/o
Valdemar Cassanga	3–0	Sekou Ahmed Conté	w/o

==== Group 4 ====
Pos	Team	Pld	W	L	SF	SA	SR	Pts	Qualification
1	South Africa	2	2	0	6	1	6.000	4	Round of 16
2	Uganda	2	1	1	4	3	1.333	3	Round of 16
3	Republic of the Congo	2	0	2	0	6	0.000	2	

Source: International Table Tennis Federation

6 March 2024; 10:00	Uganda	3–0	Republic of the Congo

	Individual matches
Joseph Sebatindira	3–0	Régis Kiassi	w/o
Samuel Ankunda	3–0	Brijack Tando	w/o
Jonathan Senyonga	3–0	Cheldon Sindani	w/o

6 March 2024; 12:00	South Africa	3–0	Republic of the Congo

	Individual matches
Chetan Nathoo	3–0	Régis Kiassi	w/o
Luke Abrahams	3–0	Brijack Tando	w/o
Liam Beukes	3–0	Cheldon Sindani	w/o

6 March 2024; 16:00	South Africa	3–1	Uganda

	Individual matches
Luke Abrahams	3–2	Samuel Ankunda	6–11, 23–21, 11–6, 9–11, 14–12
Chetan Nathoo	3–2	Jonathan Senyonga	11–6, 7–11, 11–9, 9–11, 11–9
Cowen Lodewyk	1–3	Joseph Sebatindira	9–11, 7–11, 11–4, 4–11
Luke Abrahams	3–1	Jonathan Senyonga	13–11, 11–9, 11–13, 11–3

==== Group 5 ====
Pos	Team	Pld	W	L	SF	SA	SR	Pts	Qualification
1	Madagascar	2	2	0	6	0	—	4	Round of 16
2	Ghana	2	1	1	3	3	1.000	3	Round of 16
3	Sudan	2	0	2	0	6	0.000	2	

Source: International Table Tennis Federation

6 March 2024; 10:00	Madagascar	3–0	Sudan

	Individual matches
Fabio Rakotoarimanana	3–0	Mohammed Adam	11–4, 11–7, 11–4
Setra Rakotoarisoa	3–0	Mohamed Nadir	11–2, 11–4, 11–7
Mamy Rakotoarisoa	3–1	El Mutasim Idris	20–18, 6–11, 11–6, 11–8

6 March 2024; 12:00	Ghana	0–3	Madagascar

	Individual matches
Samuel Akayade	1–3	Setra Rakotoarisoa	10–12, 8–11, 12–10, 5–11
Emmanuel Commey	0–3	Fabio Rakotoarimanana	7–11, 11–13, 7–11
Bernard Sam	2–3	Mamy Rakotoarisoa	6–11, 7–11, 13–11, 11–8, 7–11

6 March 2024; 16:00	Sudan	0–3	Ghana

	Individual matches
El Mutasim Idris	0–3	Emmanuel Commey	6–11, 8–11, 6–11
Mohamed Nadir	0–3	Samuel Akayade	6–11, 3–1, 8–11
Mohammed Adam	0–3	Bernard Sam	5–11, 7–11, 9–11

==== Group 6 ====
Pos	Team	Pld	W	L	SF	SA	SR	Pts	Qualification
1	Tunisia	2	2	0	6	1	6.000	4	Round of 16
2	Ivory Coast	2	1	1	4	4	1.000	3	Round of 16
3	Kenya	2	0	2	1	6	0.167	2	

Source: International Table Tennis Federation

6 March 2024; 10:00	Tunisia	3–0	Kenya

	Individual matches
Wassim Essid	3–0	Peter Muturi	11–6, 11–6, 11–1
Khalil Sta	3–0	Brian Mutua	11–7, 11–7, 12–10
Youssef Ben Attia	3–0	Josiah Wandera	11–6, 11–6, 11–8

6 March 2024; 12:00	Tunisia	3–1	Ivory Coast

	Individual matches
Wassim Essid	3–0	Oba Kizito Oba	12–10, 11–8, 11–6
Khalil Sta	2–3	Jean Pierre Bayala	11–4, 5–11, 10–12, 11–8, 5–11
Youssef Ben Attia	3–0	Ben Moussa Dosso	11–6, 11–9, 11–6
Wassim Essid	3–0	Jean Pierre Bayala	11–4, 11–8, 11–7

6 March 2024; 16:00	Ivory Coast	3–1	Kenya

	Individual matches
Oba Kizito Oba	3–1	Peter Muturi	11–5, 5–11, 11–5, 11–9
Jean Pierre Bayala	0–3	Brian Mutua	8–11, 9–11, 6–11
Ben Moussa Dosso	3–0	Josiah Wandera	11–8, 11–5, 14–12
Oba Kizito Oba	3–0	Brian Mutua	11–4, 18–16, 11–7

=== Knockout stage ===
==== Bracket ====
Rounf of 16
Uganda	0
Ivory Coast	3
Madagascar	3
Democratic Republic of the Congo	1
Ghana	0
Tunisia	3
Ethiopia	2
Angola	3

Quarterfinals
Egypt	3
Ivory Coast	0
Madagascar	0
Algeria	3
South Africa	0
Tunisia	3
Angola	0
Nigeria	3

Semifinals
Egypt	3
Algeria	0
Tunisia	1
Nigeria	3

Final
Egypt	3
Nigeria	0

==== Round of 16 ====
6 March 2024; 18:00	Uganda	0–3	Ivory Coast

	Individual matches
Samuel Ankunda	0–3	Jean Pierre Bayala	10–12, 8–11, 2–11
Jonathan Senyonga	0–3	Oba Kizito Oba	8–11, 6–11, 7–11
Joseph Sebatindira	0–3	Ben Moussa Dosso	10–12, 9–11, 9–11

6 March 2024; 18:00	Madagascar	3–1	Democratic Republic of the Congo

	Individual matches
Fabio Rakotoarimanana	3–0	Christian Mbongia	11–6, 11–3, 11–7
Setra Rakotoarisoa	3–1	Gedeon Kassa	10–12, 12–10, 11–9, 15–13
Mamy Rakotoarisoa	1–3	Bertin Mingashanga	11–7, 8–11, 6–11, 8–11
Fabio Rakotoarimanana	3–0	Gedeon Kassa	11–4, 11–3, 11–5

6 March 2024; 18:00	Ghana	0–3	Tunisia

	Individual matches
Samuel Akayade	1–3	Khalil Sta	8–11, 12–10, 10–12, 5–11
Emmanuel Commey	0–3	Wassim Essid	9–11, 9–11, 9–11
Bernard Sam	0–3	Youssef Ben Attia	9–11, 7–11, 5–11

6 March 2024; 18:00	Ethiopia	2–3	Angola

	Individual matches
Darara Mokonen Dufera	3–0	Délcio Cassule	11–8, 11–4, 12–10
Daniel Beyene	0–3	Elizandro Andre	7–11, 6–11, 8–11
Eyob Sissay Abeje	1–3	Antonio Lemos	12–10, 11–13, 8–11, 8–11
Darara Mokonen Dufera	3–0	Elizandro Andre	11–2, 11–5, 11–7
Daniel Beyene	2–3	Délcio Cassule	8–11, 11–4, 5–11, 11–9, 8–11

==== Quarterfinals ====
7 March 2024; 10:00	Egypt	3–0	Ivory Coast

	Individual matches
Youssef Abdel-Aziz	3–0	Oba Kizito Oba	11–2, 11–7, 11–5
Omar Assar	3–0	Ben Moussa Dosso	11–7, 11–7, 12–10
Mohamed El-Beiali	3–0	Jean Pierre Bayala	11–6, 11–7, 11–8

7 March 2024; 10:00	Madagascar	0–3	Algeria

	Individual matches
Setra Rakotoarisoa	2–3	Mehdi Bouloussa	11–8, 4–11, 6–11, 11–8, 8–11
Fabio Rakotoarimanana	1–3	Stéphane Ouaiche	5–11, 5–11, 11–8, 5–11
Mamy Rakotoarisoa	1–3	Sami Kherouf	11–8, 10–12, 6–11, 10–12

7 March 2024; 10:00	South Africa	0–3	Tunisia

	Individual matches
Chetan Nathoo	0–3	Wassim Essid	6–11, 7–11, 2–11
Luke Abrahams	0–3	Khalil Sta	4–11, 6–11, 6–11
Liam Beukes	0–3	Youssef Ben Attia	8–11, 8–11, 7–11

7 March 2024; 10:00	Angola	0–3	Nigeria

	Individual matches
Valdemar Cassanga	0–3	Olajide Omotayo	7–11, 3–11, 7–11
Elizandro Andre	0–3	Quadri Aruna	4–11, 8–11, 5–11
Antonio Lemos	0–3	Taiwo Mati	3–11, 7–11, 3–11

==== Semifinals ====
7 March 2024; 18:30	Egypt	3–0	Algeria

	Individual matches
Omar Assar	3–0	Mehdi Bouloussa	11–8, 11–8, 11–8
Youssef Abdel-Aziz	3–1	Stéphane Ouaiche	13–11, 6–11, 11–4, 11–4
Mohamed El-Beiali	3–0	Sami Kherouf	11–2, 11–6, 14–12

7 March 2024; 18:30	Tunisia	1–3	Nigeria

	Individual matches
Youssef Ben Attia	0–3	Quadri Aruna	4–11, 9–11, 9–11
Wassim Essid	3–0	Olajide Omotayo	11–6, 14–12, 11–8
Khalil Sta	0–3	Taiwo Mati	8–11, 10–12, 4–11
Wassim Essid	2–3	Quadri Aruna	11–7, 6–11, 11–9, 2–11, 4–11

==== Final ====
8 March 2024; 11:00	Egypt	3–0	Nigeria

	Individual matches
Omar Assar	3–1	Olajide Omotayo	11–9, 11–8, 3–11, 11–8
Youssef Abdel-Aziz	3–1	Quadri Aruna	11–6, 6–11, 11–5, 11–6
Mohamed El-Beiali	3–1	Taiwo Mati	12–10, 11–2, 6–11, 11–9
