= Table tennis at the 2023 African Games – Men's doubles =

Men's doubles at the 2023 African Games
- Venue: Accra International Conference Centre
- Date: 10 March 2024

Medalists
gold medal	Mehdi Bouloussa; Stéphane Ouaiche	Algeria
silver medal	Khalid Assar; Mohamed Shouman	Egypt
bronze medal	Youssef Abdel-Aziz; Mohamed El-Beiali	Egypt
bronze medal	Matthew Kuti; Taiwo Mati	Nigeria

The men's doubles table tennis event at the 2023 African Games took place on 10 March 2024 at the Accra International Conference Centre.

== Schedule ==
All times are Greenwich Mean Time (UTC+00:00)

Date	Time	Event
Sunday, 10 March 2024	10:00	Round of 32
Sunday, 10 March 2024	11:30	Round of 16
Sunday, 10 March 2024	12:30	Quarterfinals
Sunday, 10 March 2024	17:00	Semifinals
Sunday, 10 March 2024	18:00	Final

== Results ==
=== Finals ===
Semifinals					Final
Matthew Kuti (NGR); Taiwo Mati (NGR)	4	13	5	6
Khalid Assar (EGY); Mohamed Shouman (EGY)	11	11	11	11	Khalid Assar (EGY); Mohamed Shouman (EGY)	11	6	9	11	5
Mehdi Bouloussa (ALG); Stéphane Ouaiche (ALG)	11	11	11		Mehdi Bouloussa (ALG); Stéphane Ouaiche (ALG)	9	11	11	7	11
Youssef Abdel-Aziz (EGY); Mohamed El-Beiali (EGY)	7	5	8

=== Top half ===
==== Section 1 ====
Round of 32
Youssef Ben Atia (TUN); Wassim Essid (TUN)	w/o
Emmanuel Koroma (SLE); Bredford Sawyer (SLE)
Elizandro Andre (ANG); Valdemar Cassanga (ANG)	4	11	10	9
Charles Banda (ZAM); Choolwe Hanalanbo (ZAM)	11	5	12	11
Liam Beukes (RSA); Cowen Lodewyk (RSA)	8	11	11	11	11
Daniel Beyene (ETH); Daneil Hadsh (ETH)	11	13	5	4	7
Saheed Idowu (CGO); Régis Kiassi (CGO)	5	7	5
Matthew Kuti (NGR); Taiwo Mati (NGR)	11	11	11

Round of 16
Youssef Ben Atia (TUN); Wassim Essid (TUN)	11	11	11
Charles Banda (ZAM); Choolwe Hanalanbo (ZAM)	5	6	8
Liam Beukes (RSA); Cowen Lodewyk (RSA)	5	8	4
Matthew Kuti (NGR); Taiwo Mati (NGR)	11	11	11

Quarterfinals
Youssef Ben Atia (TUN); Wassim Essid (TUN)	9	6	11	3
Matthew Kuti (NGR); Taiwo Mati (NGR)	11	11	3	11

==== Section 2 ====
Round of 32
Khalid Assar (EGY); Mohamed Shouman (EGY)	11	12	11
Gedeon Kassa (COD); Bertin Mingashanga (COD)	8	10	2
Samuel Ankunda (UGA); Jonathan Senyonga (UGA)	11	9	11	5	11
Brian Mutua (KEN); Josiah Wandera (KEN)	9	11	3	11	8
Bernard Sam (GHA); Israel Aklie (GHA)	11	11	11
Cheldon Sindani (CGO); Brijack Tando (CGO)	7	6	7
Arma Kamara (LBR); Bogton Pyee (LBR)	3	6	6
Milhane Jellouli (ALG); Sami Kherouf (ALG)	11	11	11

Round of 16
Khalid Assar (EGY); Mohamed Shouman (EGY)	11	13	11
Samuel Ankunda (UGA); Jonathan Senyonga (UGA)	5	11	8
Bernard Sam (GHA); Israel Aklie (GHA)	5	8	10
Milhane Jellouli (ALG); Sami Kherouf (ALG)	11	11	12

Quarterfinals
Khalid Assar (EGY); Mohamed Shouman (EGY)	11	11	8	11
Milhane Jellouli (ALG); Sami Kherouf (ALG)	9	7	11	7

=== Bottom half ===
==== Section 3 ====
Round of 32
Amadi Omeh (NGR); Olajide Omotayo (NGR)	11	11	11
Christian Mbongia (COD); Exauce Ngefuassa (COD)	8	7	9
Joseph Sebatindira (UGA); Sharif Nsereko (UGA)	2	10	11	4
Ben Moussa Dosso (CIV); Oba Kizito Oba (CIV)	11	12	9	11
Mehdi Bouloussa (ALG); Stéphane Ouaiche (ALG)	11	11	11
El Hacen Ahmed (MTN); Haruna Sagna (MTN)	2	3	5
Eyob Sissay Abeje (ETH); Darara Mokonen Dufera (ETH)	5	9	7
Fabio Rakotoarimanana (MAD); Setra Rakotoarisoa (MAD)	11	11	11

Round of 16
Amadi Omeh (NGR); Olajide Omotayo (NGR)	11	11	8	11
Ben Moussa Dosso (CIV); Oba Kizito Oba (CIV)	5	9	11	5
Mehdi Bouloussa (ALG); Stéphane Ouaiche (ALG)	11	11	11
Fabio Rakotoarimanana (MAD); Setra Rakotoarisoa (MAD)	8	9	5

Quarterfinals
Amadi Omeh (NGR); Olajide Omotayo (NGR)	3	6	8
Mehdi Bouloussa (ALG); Stéphane Ouaiche (ALG)	11	11	11

==== Section 4 ====
Round of 32
Luke Abrahams (RSA); Chetan Nathoo (RSA)	11	11	11
El Mutasim Idris (SUD); Mohammed Adam (SUD)	5	4	3
Samuel Akayade (GHA); Emmanuel Commey (GHA)	11	11	11
Antonio Lemos (ANG); Délcio Cassule (ANG)	6	6	2
Arnaud Kekessi (BUR); Ousseni Tapsoba (BUR)	12	11	8	11	8
Anaab Abduldaim (KEN); Peter Muturi (KEN)	10	13	11	9	11
Andy Bringaud (GAB); Trésor Ndong Ndoutoume (GAB)	3	8	5
Youssef Abdel-Aziz (EGY); Mohamed El-Beiali (EGY)	11	11	11

Round of 16
Luke Abrahams (RSA); Chetan Nathoo (RSA)	11	11	8	10	11
Samuel Akayade (GHA); Emmanuel Commey (GHA)	9	7	11	12	8
Anaab Abduldaim (KEN); Peter Muturi (KEN)	4	2	5
Youssef Abdel-Aziz (EGY); Mohamed El-Beiali (EGY)	11	11	11

Quarterfinals
Luke Abrahams (RSA); Chetan Nathoo (RSA)	8	5	4
Youssef Abdel-Aziz (EGY); Mohamed El-Beiali (EGY)	11	11	11
