= Table tennis at the 2023 African Games =

- Venue: Accra International Conference Centre
- Location: Accra, Ghana
- Dates: 4–10 March 2024

Table tennis events at the 2023 African Games took place from 4 to 10 March 2024 at the Accra International Conference Centre in Accra, Ghana.

== Schedule ==
P	Preliminary rounds	¼	Quarterfinals	½	Semifinals	F	Final

Event↓/Date →	4th Mon	5th Tue			6th Wed	7th Thu		8th Fri	9th Sat				10th Sun			
Men's singles	P	¼	½	F												
Men's doubles													P	¼	½	F
Men's team					P	¼	½	F								
Women's singles	P	¼	½	F												
Women's doubles													P	¼	½	F
Women's team					P	¼	½	F								
Mixed doubles									P	¼	½	F				

== Medalists ==
=== Men ===
Event	Gold	Silver	Bronze
Singles	Omar Assar; Egypt	Quadri Aruna; Nigeria	Ibrahima Diaw; Senegal
Singles	Omar Assar; Egypt	Quadri Aruna; Nigeria	Mohamed El-Beiali; Egypt
Doubles	Algeria; Mehdi Bouloussa; Stéphane Ouaiche	Egypt; Khalid Assar; Mohamed Shouman	Egypt; Youssef Abdel-Aziz; Mohamed El-Beiali
Doubles	Algeria; Mehdi Bouloussa; Stéphane Ouaiche	Egypt; Khalid Assar; Mohamed Shouman	Nigeria; Matthew Kuti; Taiwo Mati
Team	Egypt; Youssef Abdel-Aziz; Omar Assar; Khalid Assar; Mohamed El-Beiali; Mohamed Shouman	Nigeria; Quadri Aruna; Matthew Kuti; Taiwo Mati; Amadi Omeh; Olajide Omotayo	Algeria; Maheidine Bella; Mehdi Bouloussa; Milhane Jellouli; Sami Kherouf; Stéphane Ouaiche
Team	Egypt; Youssef Abdel-Aziz; Omar Assar; Khalid Assar; Mohamed El-Beiali; Mohamed Shouman	Nigeria; Quadri Aruna; Matthew Kuti; Taiwo Mati; Amadi Omeh; Olajide Omotayo	Tunisia; Youssef Ben Attia; Wassim Essid; Khalil Sta

=== Women ===
Event	Gold	Silver	Bronze
Singles	Hana Goda; Egypt	Dina Meshref; Egypt	Lucie Mobarek; Algeria
Singles	Hana Goda; Egypt	Dina Meshref; Egypt	Offiong Edem; Nigeria
Doubles	Egypt; Mariam Al-Hodaby; Marwa Al-Hodaby	Tunisia; Fadwa Garci; Abir Haj Salah	Nigeria; Fatimo Bello; Offiong Edem
Doubles	Egypt; Mariam Al-Hodaby; Marwa Al-Hodaby	Tunisia; Fadwa Garci; Abir Haj Salah	Algeria; Lucie Mobarek; Lynda Loghraibi
Team	Egypt; Mariam Al-Hodaby; Marwa Al-Hodaby; Hana Goda; Yousra Helmy; Dina Meshref	Nigeria; Sukurat Aiyelabegan; Fatimo Bello; Offiong Edem; Esther Oribamise; Hope Udoaka	Tunisia; Fadwa Garci; Abir Haj Salah; Maram Zoghlami
Team	Egypt; Mariam Al-Hodaby; Marwa Al-Hodaby; Hana Goda; Yousra Helmy; Dina Meshref	Nigeria; Sukurat Aiyelabegan; Fatimo Bello; Offiong Edem; Esther Oribamise; Hope Udoaka	South Africa; Lailaa Edwards; Musfiquh Kalam; Danisha Patel; Rochica Sonday

=== Mixed ===
Event	Gold	Silver	Bronze
Doubles	Egypt; Youssef Abdel-Aziz; Mariam Al-Hodaby	Algeria; Stéphane Ouaiche; Lucie Mobarek	Egypt; Mohamed El-Beiali; Marwa Al-Hodaby
Doubles	Egypt; Youssef Abdel-Aziz; Mariam Al-Hodaby	Algeria; Stéphane Ouaiche; Lucie Mobarek	Madagascar; Fabio Rakotoarimanana; Hanitra Raharimanana

== Medal table ==
Rank	Nation	Gold	Silver	Bronze	Total
1	Egypt (EGY)	6	2	3	11
2	Algeria (ALG)	1	1	3	5
3	Nigeria (NGR)	0	3	3	6
4	Tunisia (TUN)	0	1	2	3
5	Madagascar (MAD)	0	0	1	1
5	Senegal (SEN)	0	0	1	1
5	South Africa (RSA)	0	0	1	1
Totals (7 entries)		7	7	14	28
