= Table tennis at the 2023 African Games – Women's doubles =

Women's doubles at the 2023 African Games
- Venue: Accra International Conference Centre
- Date: 10 March 2024

Medalists
gold medal	Mariam Al-Hodaby; Marwa Al-Hodaby	Egypt
silver medal	Fadwa Garci; Abir Haj Salah	Tunisia
bronze medal	Fatimo Bello; Offiong Edem	Nigeria
bronze medal	Lucie Mobarek; Lynda Loghraibi	Algeria

The women's doubles table tennis event at the 2023 African Games took place on 10 March 2024 at the Accra International Conference Centre.

== Schedule ==
All times are Greenwich Mean Time (UTC+00:00)

Date	Time	Event
Sunday, 10 March 2024	9:30	Round of 32
Sunday, 10 March 2024	11:00	Round of 16
Sunday, 10 March 2024	12:00	Quarterfinals
Sunday, 10 March 2024	16:30	Semifinals
Sunday, 10 March 2024	17:30	Final

== Results ==
=== Finals ===
Semifinals					Final
Fatimo Bello (NGR); Offiong Edem (NGR)	12	4	11	5
Mariam Al-Hodaby (EGY); Marwa Al-Hodaby (EGY)	14	11	4	11	Mariam Al-Hodaby (EGY); Marwa Al-Hodaby (EGY)	12	7	11	11
Lucie Mobarek (ALG); Lynda Loghraibi (ALG)	11	8	7	6	Fadwa Garci (TUN); Abir Haj Salah (TUN)	10	11	7	5
Fadwa Garci (TUN); Abir Haj Salah (TUN)	9	11	11	11

=== Top half ===
==== Section 1 ====
Round of 32				Round of 16					Quarterfinals
				Fatimo Bello (NGR); Offiong Edem (NGR)	11	11	11
				Doreen Juma (KEN); Nasimuyu Lisa (KEN)	5	6	4
									Fatimo Bello (NGR); Offiong Edem (NGR)	11	11	11
Mubanga Kunda (ZAM); Latifa Nalavwe (ZAM)	11	12	11						Musfiquh Kalam (RSA); Danisha Patel (RSA)	9	4	4
Thomie Mossemba (CGO); Ruth Elenghat (CGO)	6	10	9	Mubanga Kunda (ZAM); Latifa Nalavwe (ZAM)	13	1	4	6
				Musfiquh Kalam (RSA); Danisha Patel (RSA)	11	11	11	11

==== Section 2 ====
Round of 32					Round of 16					Quarterfinals
					Amina Kessaci (ALG); Malissa Nasri (ALG)	11	11	11	11
Meron Mekuria (ETH); Yirgalem Watiro (ETH)	11	6	11	3	Eva Adom-Amankwaa (GHA); Cynthia Kwabi (GHA)	9	13	3	8
Eva Adom-Amankwaa (GHA); Cynthia Kwabi (GHA)	5	11	13	11						Amina Kessaci (ALG); Malissa Nasri (ALG)	9	11	6	10
Isabel Albino (ANG); Ruth Tavares (ANG)	w/o									Mariam Al-Hodaby (EGY); Marwa Al-Hodaby (EGY)	11	8	11	12
Fatou Bangoura (GUI); Sia Camara (GUI)					Isabel Albino (ANG); Ruth Tavares (ANG)	1	5	5
					Mariam Al-Hodaby (EGY); Marwa Al-Hodaby (EGY)	11	11	11

=== Bottom half ===
==== Section 3 ====
Round of 32						Round of 16					Quarterfinals
						Jemimah Nakawala (UGA); Judith Nangonzi (UGA)	11	11	11
Nelly Mutuma (KEN); Sifa Nafula (KEN)	11	13	7	7	9	Guynehe Djagana (CGO); Beria Francelle Gamago (CGO)	3	6	2
Guynehe Djagana (CGO); Beria Francelle Gamago (CGO)	8	11	11	11	11						Jemimah Nakawala (UGA); Judith Nangonzi (UGA)	11	5	11	3
Lucie Mobarek (ALG); Lynda Loghraibi (ALG)	11	11	11								Lucie Mobarek (ALG); Lynda Loghraibi (ALG)	13	11	6	11
Lailaa Edwards (RSA); Rochica Sonday (RSA)	7	7	9			Lucie Mobarek (ALG); Lynda Loghraibi (ALG)	7	13	11	11
						Esther Oribamise (NGR); Hope Udoaka (NGR)	11	11	4	7

==== Section 4 ====
Round of 32				Round of 16				Quarterfinals
				Hanitra Raharimanana (MAD); Ranto Rakotondrazaka (MAD)	11	11	11
Eugenia Esperança Simoes (ANG); Kailane Sousa (ANG)	7	5	9	Joanita Borteye (GHA); Celia Baah-Danso (GHA)	8	5	7
Joanita Borteye (GHA); Celia Baah-Danso (GHA)	11	11	11					Hanitra Raharimanana (MAD); Ranto Rakotondrazaka (MAD)	5	8	8
Habibou Derra (BUR); Mamounata Derra (BUR)	3	7	7					Fadwa Garci (TUN); Abir Haj Salah (TUN)	11	11	11
Yordanos Ngidie Dejene (ETH); Fana Rezene Ftwi (ETH)	11	11	11	Yordanos Ngidie Dejene (ETH); Fana Rezene Ftwi (ETH)	7	7	1
				Fadwa Garci (TUN); Abir Haj Salah (TUN)	11	11	11
