= Table tennis at the 2023 African Games – Women's team =

Women's team at the 2023 African Games
- Venue: Accra International Conference Centre
- Date: 6 − 8 March 2024

Medalists
gold medal	Mariam Al-Hodaby; Marwa Al-Hodaby; Hana Goda; Yousra Helmy; Dina Meshref	Egypt
silver medal	Sukurat Aiyelabegan; Fatimo Bello; Offiong Edem; Esther Oribamise; Hope Udoaka	Nigeria
bronze medal	Fadwa Garci; Abir Haj Salah; Maram Zoghlami	Tunisia
bronze medal	Lailaa Edwards; Musfiquh Kalam; Danisha Patel; Rochica Sonday	South Africa

The women's team table tennis event at the 2023 African Games took place from 6 to 8 March 2024 at the Accra International Conference Centre.

== Schedule ==
All times are Greenwich Mean Time (UTC+00:00)

Date	Time	Event
Wednesday, 6 March 2024	10:00	Group stage
Thursday, 7 March 2024	10:00	Quarterfinals
Thursday, 7 March 2024	17:00	Semifinals
Friday, 8 March 2024	10:00	Final

== Results ==
All times are Greenwich Mean Time (UTC+00:00)

=== Group stage ===
==== Group 1 ====
Pos	Team	Pld	W	L	SF	SA	SR	Pts	Qualification
1	Egypt	2	2	0	6	0	—	4	Quarterfinals
2	Ghana	2	1	1	3	5	0.600	3	Quarterfinals
3	Uganda	2	0	2	2	6	0.333	2	

Source: International Table Tennis Federation

6 March 2024; 10:00	Ghana	0–3	Egypt

	Individual matches
Cynthia Kwabi	0–3	Yousra Helmy	4–11, 3–11, 6–11
Joanita Borteye	0–3	Hana Goda	3–11, 3–11, 3–11
Celia Baah-Danso	0–3	Marwa Al-Hodaby	5–11, 5–11, 5–11

6 March 2024; 12:00	Egypt	3–0	Uganda

	Individual matches
Mariam Al-Hodaby	3–0	Shanitah Namaala	11–6, 11–2, 11–4
Yousra Helmy	3–0	Judith Nangonzi	11–9, 11–8, 11–5
Marwa Al-Hodaby	3–0	Jemimah Nakawala	11–7, 11–5, 11–6

6 March 2024; 16:00	Uganda	2–3	Ghana

	Individual matches
Judith Nangonzi	3–2	Celia Baah-Danso	11–6, 11–4, 9–11, 9–11, 11–8
Jemimah Nakawala	3–1	Cynthia Kwabi	7–11, 11–8, 11–6, 11–9
Shanitah Namaala	0–3	Joanita Borteye	8–11, 2–11, 3–11
Judith Nangonzi	0–3	Cynthia Kwabi	9–11, 11–13, 11–13
Jemimah Nakawala	2–3	Celia Baah-Danso	11–8, 2–11, 9–11, 12–10, 7–11

==== Group 2 ====
Pos	Team	Pld	W	L	SF	SA	SR	Pts	Qualification
1	South Africa	2	2	0	6	0	—	4	Quarterfinals
2	Angola	2	1	1	3	3	1.000	3	Quarterfinals
3	Republic of the Congo	2	0	2	0	6	0.000	2	

Source: International Table Tennis Federation

6 March 2024; 10:00	Angola	0–3	South Africa

	Individual matches
Isabel Albino	0–3	Danisha Patel	5–11, 5–11, 7–11
Ruth Tavares	1–3	Musfiquh Kalam	10–12, 1–11, 11–9, 4–11
Kailane Sousa	1–3	Lailaa Edwards	2–11, 7–11, 11–7, 9–11

6 March 2024; 12:00	South Africa	3–0	Republic of the Congo

	Individual matches
Lailaa Edwards	3–0	Ruth Elenghat	w/o
Rochica Sonday	3–0	Beria Francelle Gamago	w/o
Danisha Patel	3–0	Guynehe Djagana	w/o

6 March 2024; 16:00	Angola	3–0	Republic of the Congo

	Individual matches
Eugenia Esperança Simoes	3–0	Ruth Elenghat	w/o
Nelma Moisés	3–0	Beria Francelle Gamago	w/o
Ruth Tavares	3–0	Guynehe Djagana	w/o

==== Group 3 ====
Pos	Team	Pld	W	L	SF	SA	SR	Pts	Qualification
1	Nigeria	2	2	0	6	1	6.000	4	Quarterfinals
2	Algeria	2	1	1	4	3	1.333	3	Quarterfinals
3	Madagascar	2	0	2	0	6	0.000	2	

Source: International Table Tennis Federation

6 March 2024; 10:00	Nigeria	3–0	Madagascar

	Individual matches
Offiong Edem	3–1	Ranto Rakotondrazaka	11–8, 11–9, 5–11, 11–3
Fatimo Bello	3–2	Hanitra Raharimanana	9–11, 10–12, 11–5, 11–5, 11–6
Esther Oribamise	3–2	Mahenika Andriamanantena	11–4, 10–12, 11–8, 7–11, 11–5

6 March 2024; 12:00	Algeria	1–3	Nigeria

	Individual matches
Lucie Mobarek	3–0	Fatimo Bello	11–1, 11–6, 11–6
Lynda Loghraibi	1–3	Offiong Edem	11–6, 2–11, 7–11, 6–11
Malissa Nasri	1–3	Esther Oribamise	11–13, 4–11, 11–9, 3–11
Lucie Mobarek	2–3	Offiong Edem	6–11, 11–9, 9–11, 12–10, 9–11

6 March 2024; 16:00	Algeria	3–0	Madagascar

	Individual matches
Lucie Mobarek	3–0	Ranto Rakotondrazaka	11–5, 11–4, 13–11
Lynda Loghraibi	3–2	Hanitra Raharimanana	5–11, 11–9, 6–11, 11–6, 11–5
Malissa Nasri	3–0	Mahenika Andriamanantena	11–3, 11–9, 11–9

==== Group 4 ====
Pos	Team	Pld	W	L	SF	SA	SR	Pts	Qualification
1	Tunisia	2	2	0	6	0	—	4	Quarterfinals
2	Ethiopia	2	1	1	3	3	1.000	3	Quarterfinals
3	Kenya	2	0	2	0	6	0.000	2	

Source: International Table Tennis Federation

6 March 2024; 10:00	Kenya	0–3	Tunisia

	Individual matches
Nasimuyu Lisa	0–3	Maram Zoghlami	1–11, 9–11, 3–11
Doreen Juma	0–3	Fadwa Garci	8–11, 5–11, 4–11
Nelly Mutuma	1–3	Abir Haj Salah	11–5, 9–11, 3–11, 4–11

6 March 2024; 12:00	Tunisia	3–0	Ethiopia

	Individual matches
Maram Zoghlami	3–0	Yirgalem Watiro	11–2, 11–7, 11–7
Fadwa Garci	3–0	Meron Mekuria	11–7, 11–4, 11–4
Abir Haj Salah	3–0	Fana Rezene Ftwi	11–8, 11–6, 11–1

6 March 2024; 16:00	Ethiopia	3–0	Kenya

	Individual matches
Meron Mekuria	3–1	Doreen Juma	11–7, 7–11, 11–7, 11–3
Yordanos Ngidie Dejene	3–2	Nasimuyu Lisa	11–5, 6–11, 11–8, 5–11, 11–8
Feven Tamiru Kinfu	3–1	Nelly Mutuma	11–9, 11–5, 7–11, 11–5

=== Knockout stage ===
==== Bracket ====
Quarterfinals		Semifinals		Final
Egypt	3
Algeria	0	Egypt	3
Angola	1	Tunisia	0
Tunisia	3			Egypt	3
Nigeria	3			Nigeria	0
Ethiopia	0	Nigeria	3
Ghana	2	South Africa	0
South Africa	3

==== Quarterfinals ====
7 March 2024; 10:00	Egypt	3–0	Algeria

	Individual matches
Dina Meshref	3–0	Amina Kessaci	11–5, 11–6, 11–6
Hana Goda	3–1	Lucie Mobarek	11–3, 11–9, 9–11, 11–9
Mariam Al-Hodaby	3–0	Lynda Loghraibi	11–6, 11–8, 11–8

7 March 2024; 10:00	Angola	1–3	Tunisia

	Individual matches
Ruth Tavares	0–3	Maram Zoghlami	5–11, 7–11, 8–11
Isabel Albino	3–0	Fadwa Garci	11–8, 11–6, 11–8
Kailane Sousa	0–3	Abir Haj Salah	8–11, 6–11, 7–11
Ruth Tavares	0–3	Fadwa Garci	6–11, 6–11, 3–11

7 March 2024; 10:00	Nigeria	3–0	Ethiopia

	Individual matches
Fatimo Bello	3–0	Meron Mekuria	11–3, 11–3, 11–4
Offiong Edem	3–0	Feven Tamiru Kinfu	11–5, 11–3, 11–9
Esther Oribamise	3–0	Yordanos Ngidie Dejene	11–4, 11–4, 11–13, 11–3

7 March 2024; 10:00	Ghana	2–3	South Africa

	Individual matches
Celia Baah-Danso	2–3	Musfiquh Kalam	6–11, 11–6, 11–7, 10–12, 10–13
Cynthia Kwabi	0–3	Danisha Patel	6–11, 9–11, 9–11
Joanita Borteye	3–0	Rochica Sonday	11–9, 11–9, 11–9
Cynthia Kwabi	3–1	Musfiquh Kalam	15–13, 17–15, 8–11, 11–7
Celia Baah-Danso	2–3	Danisha Patel	11–8, 11–8, 6–11, 8–11, 8–11

==== Semifinals ====
7 March 2024; 17:00	Egypt	3–0	Tunisia

	Individual matches
Dina Meshref	3–1	Fadwa Garci	8–11, 11–2, 11–1, 11–7
Hana Goda	3–0	Maram Zoghlami	11–5, 11–4, 11–3
Mariam Al-Hodaby	3–2	Abir Haj Salah	11–2, 11–3, 9–11, 6–11, 11–7

7 March 2024; 17:00	Nigeria	3–0	South Africa

	Individual matches
Fatimo Bello	3–0	Danisha Patel	11–6, 11–8, 11–3
Offiong Edem	3–0	Musfiquh Kalam	11–9, 11–4, 11–9
Esther Oribamise	3–2	Rochica Sonday	9–11, 11–8, 11–6, 9–11, 11–9

==== Final ====
8 March 2024; 10:00	Egypt	3–0	Nigeria

	Individual matches
Hana Goda	3–0	Offiong Edem	11–5, 11–5, 11–6
Dina Meshref	3–0	Hope Udoaka	11–3, 11–3, 11–2
Mariam Al-Hodaby	3–1	Fatimo Bello	9–11, 12–10, 11–5, 11–9
