= Wrestling at the 2023 African Games =

- Venue: Borteyman Sports Complex
- Location: Accra, Ghana
- Dates: 9–11 March 2024
- Competitors: 161 from 28 nations

Wrestling at the 2023 African Games was held from 9 to 11 March 2024 at the Borteyman Sports Complex in Accra, Ghana.

== Medal table ==
* Host nation (Ghana)

Rank	Nation	Gold	Silver	Bronze	Total
1	Egypt (EGY)	10	4	4	18
2	Nigeria (NGR)	6	3	2	11
3	Algeria (ALG)	2	4	3	9
4	Cameroon (CMR)	0	2	2	4
5	Morocco (MAR)	0	2	1	3
6	Ivory Coast (CIV)	0	2	0	2
7	Tunisia (TUN)	0	1	3	4
8	Democratic Republic of the Congo (COD)	0	0	4	4
9	Angola (ANG)	0	0	2	2
9	Senegal (SEN)	0	0	2	2
9	South Africa (RSA)	0	0	2	2
12	Burkina Faso (BUR)	0	0	1	1
12	Guinea-Bissau (GBS)	0	0	1	1
12	Namibia (NAM)	0	0	1	1
Totals (14 entries)		18	18	28	64

== Medal overview ==
=== Men's freestyle ===
Event	Gold	Silver	Bronze
57 kg	Gamal Mohamed; Egypt	Enozunimi Simeon; Nigeria	Omar Faye; Senegal
57 kg	Gamal Mohamed; Egypt	Enozunimi Simeon; Nigeria	Rabby Kilandi; Democratic Republic of the Congo
65 kg	Omar Mourad; Egypt	Stephen Izolo; Nigeria	Mohamed Ben Hafsia; Tunisia
65 kg	Omar Mourad; Egypt	Stephen Izolo; Nigeria	Manaceu Ngonda; Angola
74 kg	Amr Reda Hussen; Egypt	Abdelkader Ikkal; Algeria	Bacar Ndum; Guinea-Bissau
74 kg	Amr Reda Hussen; Egypt	Abdelkader Ikkal; Algeria	Andy Kabeya Mukendi; Democratic Republic of the Congo
86 kg	Ahmed Khaled Mohamed; Egypt	Cedric Abossolo; Cameroon	Ben-Michael Theron; South Africa
86 kg	Ahmed Khaled Mohamed; Egypt	Cedric Abossolo; Cameroon	Harrison Onovwiomogbohwo; Nigeria
97 kg	Mostafa Elders; Egypt	Wali Eddine Kebir; Algeria	Aron Isomi Mbo; Democratic Republic of the Congo
125 kg	Youssif Hemida; Egypt	Ashton Mutuwa; Nigeria	Hamza Haloui; Algeria

=== Men's Greco-Roman ===
Event	Gold	Silver	Bronze
60 kg	Moamen Ahmed Mohamed; Egypt	Ismail Ettalibi; Morocco	Abdelkarim Fergat; Algeria
67 kg	Mohamed Ibrahim El-Sayed; Egypt	Ishak Ghaiou; Algeria	Souhaib Khdar; Morocco
77 kg	Abdelkrim Ouakali; Algeria	Mahmoud Abdelrahman; Egypt	Emmanuel Nworie; Nigeria
77 kg	Abdelkrim Ouakali; Algeria	Mahmoud Abdelrahman; Egypt	Radhwen Tarhouni; Tunisia
87 kg	Bachir Sid Azara; Algeria	Mohamed Metwally; Egypt	Roberto Nsangua; Angola
97 kg	Mohamed Gabr; Egypt	Fadi Rouabah; Algeria	Mohamed Dhia Jabri; Tunisia
130 kg	Abdellatif Mohamed; Egypt	Radhouane Chebbi; Tunisia	Hamza Haloui; Algeria

=== Women's freestyle ===
Event	Gold	Silver	Bronze
50 kg	Mercy Genesis; Nigeria	Nada Medani; Egypt	Rosine Assouga; Cameroon
53 kg	Christianah Ogunsanya; Nigeria	Nogona Bakayoko; Ivory Coast	Shaimaa Atef Mohamed; Egypt
53 kg	Christianah Ogunsanya; Nigeria	Nogona Bakayoko; Ivory Coast	Miriam Ngoe Wase; Cameroon
57 kg	Odunayo Adekuoroye; Nigeria	Zineb Hassoune; Morocco	Louji Yassin; Egypt
57 kg	Odunayo Adekuoroye; Nigeria	Zineb Hassoune; Morocco	Kavelishimwe Abraham; Namibia
62 kg	Esther Kolawole; Nigeria	Gharam Askar; Egypt	Salmantou Coulibaly; Burkina Faso
62 kg	Esther Kolawole; Nigeria	Gharam Askar; Egypt	Safietou Goudiaby; Senegal
68 kg	Blessing Oborududu; Nigeria	Blandine Ngiri; Cameroon	Samah Abdellatif; Egypt
68 kg	Blessing Oborududu; Nigeria	Blandine Ngiri; Cameroon	Rosie Tabora; Democratic Republic of the Congo
76 kg	Hannah Rueben; Nigeria	Amy Youin; Ivory Coast	Lillian Mbena; South Africa
76 kg	Hannah Rueben; Nigeria	Amy Youin; Ivory Coast	Samar Amer; Egypt

== Participating nations ==
161 competitors from 28 nations participated:

1. Algeria (12)
2. Angola (6)
3. Burundi (2)
4. Benin (5)
5. Burkina Faso (7)
6. Central African Republic (2)
7. Republic of the Congo (5)
8. Chad (4)
9. Ivory Coast (4)
10. Cameroon (6)
11. Democratic Republic of the Congo (8)
12. Egypt (18)
13. The Gambia (2)
14. Guinea-Bissau (1)
15. Equatorial Guinea (3)
16. Ghana (15)
17. Guinea (3)
18. Kenya (6)
19. Madagascar (4)
20. Morocco (6)
21. Mauritius (2)
22. Namibia (3)
23. Nigeria (14)
24. South Africa (6)
25. Senegal (4)
26. Sierra Leone (3)
27. Tunisia (7)
28. Uganda (3)
