= Table tennis at the 2022 Commonwealth Games – Women's team =

Table tennis – Women's team at the 2022 Commonwealth Games
- Venue: National Exhibition Centre
- Dates: 29 July – 1 August 2022
- Nations: 12

Medalists
gold medal	Zeng Jian; Zhou Jing Yi; Feng Tianwei; Wong Xin Ru	Singapore
silver medal	Tee Ai Xin; Alice Chang; Karen Lyne; Ho Ying	Malaysia
bronze medal	Feng Chunyi; Jian Fang Lay; Jee Minhyung; Liu Yangzi	Australia

Women's team table tennis at the 2022 Commonwealth Games was held at the National Exhibition Centre in Birmingham, England from 29 July to 1 August.

== Group stage ==
- 2 points were awarded for a won tie, and 1 point for a lost tie.

=== Group 1 ===
Qualified for knockout stage

Team	Pld	TW	TL	MW	ML	GW	GL	PW	PL	Pts
Singapore	3	3	0	9	0	27	1	306	120	6
England	3	2	1	6	5	22	17	353	302	5
Nigeria	3	1	2	5	6	17	21	322	320	4
Saint Vincent and the Grenadines	3	0	3	0	9	0	27	58	297	3

29 July 2022; 9:30	Singapore	3–0	England	National Exhibition Centre, Birmingham

report	Individual matches
Zhou JingYi / Zeng Jian	3–0	Charlotte Bardsley / Maria Tsaptsinos	11–5, 11–5, 11–9
Feng Tianwei	3–1	Tin-Tin Ho	9–11, 11–4, 11–7, 11–2
Zeng Jian	3–0	Maria Tsaptsinos	11–2, 11–6, 11–8

29 July 2022; 9:30	Nigeria	3–0	Saint Vincent and the Grenadines	National Exhibition Centre, Birmingham

report	Individual matches
Fatima Atinuke Bello / Offiong Edem	3–0	Unice Velox / Leah Cumberbatch	11–6, 11–2, 11–5
Esther Oribamise	3–0	Jessica Mc Carter	11–2, 11–3, 11–2
Offiong Edem	3–0	Leah Cumberbatch	11–1, 11–2, 11–3

29 July 2022; 16:00	Singapore	3–0	Nigeria	National Exhibition Centre, Birmingham

report	Individual matches
Zhou JingYi / Zeng Jian	3–0	Fatima Atinuke Bello / Offiong Edem	11–7, 11–4, 11–1
Feng Tianwei	3–0	Esther Oribamise	11–5, 11–9, 11–4
Zeng Jian	3–0	Offiong Edem	11–3, 11–3, 11–6

29 July 2022; 16:00	England	3–0	Saint Vincent and the Grenadines	National Exhibition Centre, Birmingham

report	Individual matches
Charlotte Bardsley / Maria Tsaptsinos	3–0	Unice Velox / Leah Cumberbatch	11–2, 11–1, 11–1
Tin-Tin Ho	3–0	Jessica Mc Carter	11–1, 11–1, 11–2
Maria Tsaptsinos	3–0	Unice Velox	11–3, 11–1, 11–1

30 July 2022; 16:30	Singapore	3–0	Saint Vincent and the Grenadines	National Exhibition Centre, Birmingham

report	Individual matches
Zhou JingYi / Wong Xin Ru	3–0	Shanecia Delpesche / Leah Cumberbatch	11–2, 11–2, 11–3
Zhou JingYi	3–0	Jessica Mc Carter	11–1, 11–1, 11–3
Wong Xin Ru	3–0	Shanecia Delpesche	11–2, 11–3, 11–2

30 July 2022; 16:30	Nigeria	2–3	England	National Exhibition Centre, Birmingham

report	Individual matches
Fatima Atinuke Bello / Offiong Edem	0–3	Charlotte Bardsley / Maria Tsaptsinos	6–11, 8–11, 12–14
Ajoke Ojomu	0–3	Tin-Tin Ho	4–11, 9–11, 7–11
Offiong Edem	3–1	Maria Tsaptsinos	4–11, 11–9, 13–11, 12–10
Fatima Atinuke Bello	3–2	Tin-Tin Ho	11–8, 10–12, 6–11, 11–8, 11–4
Ajoke Ojomu	2–3	Charlotte Bardsley	11–6, 7–11, 8–11, 11–3, 9–11

=== Group 2 ===
Qualified for knockout stage

Team	Pld	TW	TL	MW	ML	GW	GL	PW	PL	Pts
India	3	3	0	9	0	27	0	302	133	6
Guyana	3	2	1	6	5	19	9	325	284	5
South Africa	3	1	2	5	6	15	19	280	312	4
Fiji	3	0	3	0	9	0	27	127	305	3

29 July 2022; 9:30	India	3–0	South Africa	National Exhibition Centre, Birmingham

report	Individual matches
Reeth Tennison / Sreeja Akula	3–0	Lailaa Edwards / Danisha Patel	11–7, 11–7, 11–5
Manika Batra	3–0	Musfiquh Kalam	11–5, 11–3, 11–2
Sreeja Akula	3–0	Danisha Patel	11–5, 11–3, 11–6

29 July 2022; 9:30	Fiji	0–3	Guyana	National Exhibition Centre, Birmingham

report	Individual matches
Touea Titana / Carolyn Li	0–3	Priscilla Greaves / Natalie Cummings	1–11, 5–11, 5–11
Grace Rosi Yee	0–3	Chealsea Edghill	3–11, 4–11, 2–11
Carolyn Li	1–3	Natalie Cummings	11–6, 6–11, 3–11, 4–11

29 July 2022; 16:00	India	3–0	Fiji	National Exhibition Centre, Birmingham

report	Individual matches
Diya Parag Chitale / Sreeja Akula	3–0	Touea Titana / Grace Rosi Yee	11–8, 11–3, 11–5
Manika Batra	3–0	Carolyn Li	11–2, 11–4, 11–2
Sreeja Akula	3–0	Grace Rosi Yee	11–7, 11–1, 11–2

29 July 2022; 16:00	South Africa	2–3	Guyana	National Exhibition Centre, Birmingham

report	Individual matches
Lailaa Edwards / Danisha Patel	0–3	Natalie Cummings / Chealsea Edghill	8–11, 7–11, 2–11
Musfiquh Kalam	3–0	Priscilla Greaves	13–11, 11–4, 12–10
Danisha Patel	0–3	Chealsea Edghill	6–11, 5–11, 9–11
Musfiquh Kalam	3–1	Natalie Cummings	7–11, 15–13, 11–8, 11–8
Lailaa Edwards	0–3	Priscilla Greaves	7–11, 5–11, 7–11

30 July 2022; 9:30	India	3–0	Guyana	National Exhibition Centre, Birmingham

report	Individual matches
Sreeja Akula / Reeth Tennison	3–0	Natalie Cummings / Chealsea Edghill	11―5, 11―7, 11―7
Manika Batra	3–0	Thuraia Thomas	11―1, 11―3, 11―3
Reeth Tennison	3–0	Chealsea Edghill	11―7, 14―12, 13―11

30 July 2022; 9:30	Fiji	0–3	South Africa	National Exhibition Centre, Birmingham

report	Individual matches
Carolyn Li/ Grace Rosi Yee	0–3	Lailaa Edwards / Danisha Patel	3―11, 5―11, 11―13
Touea Titana	0–3	Musfiquh Kalam	4―11, 4―11, 4―11
Grace Rosi Yee	0–3	Danisha Patel	4―11, 6―11, 8―11

=== Group 3 ===
Qualified for knockout stage

Team	Pld	TW	TL	MW	ML	GW	GL	PW	PL	Pts
Australia	3	3	0	9	0	27	1	304	138	6
Malaysia	3	2	1	6	3	19	11	275	244	5
Mauritius	3	1	2	3	8	11	26	292	372	4
Maldives	3	0	3	2	9	9	28	262	379	3

29 July 2022; 9:30	Australia	3–0	Malaysia	National Exhibition Centre, Birmingham

report	Individual matches
Jee Minhyung / Liu Yangzi	3–1	Ho Ying / Karen Lyne	7–11, 11–3, 11–5, 11–3
Jian Fang Lay	3–0	Chang Li Sian Alice	11–1, 11–6, 11–7
Liu Yangzi	3–0	Karen Lyne	11–7, 11–9, 11–5

29 July 2022; 9:30	Mauritius	3–2	Maldives	National Exhibition Centre, Birmingham

report	Individual matches
Nandeshwaree Jalim / Ruqayyah Kinoo	3–0	Aishath Rafa Nazim / Fathimath Jumana Nimal	11–9, 11–5, 11–8
Oumehani Hosenally	1–3	Fathimath Dheema Ali	11–5, 8–11, 8–11, 5–11
Ruqayyah Kinoo	3–0	Fathimath Jumana Nimal	11–6, 11–2, 15–13
Oumehani Hosenally	0–3	Aishath Rafa Nazim	5–11, 6–11, 8–11
Nandeshwaree Jalim	3–2	Fathimath Dheema Ali	11–6, 5–11, 9–11, 11–8, 15–13

29 July 2022; 16:00	Australia	3–0	Mauritius	National Exhibition Centre, Birmingham

report	Individual matches
Feng Chunyi / Liu Yangzi	3–0	Nandeshwaree Jalim / Ruqayyah Kinoo	11–3, 11–4, 11–6
Jee Minhyung	3–0	Oumehani Hosenally	11–3, 11–2, 11–9
Liu Yangzi	3–0	Nandeshwaree Jalim	11–4, 11–4, 11–5

29 July 2022; 16:00	Malaysia	3–0	Maldives	National Exhibition Centre, Birmingham

report	Individual matches
Ho Ying / Karen Lyne	3–0	Aishath Rafa Nazim / Fathimath Jumana Nimal	11–3, 11–9, 11–5
Chang Li Sian Alice	3–0	Fathimath Dheema Ali	11–1, 11–1, 11–8
Karen Lyne	3–1	Aishath Rafa Nazim	11–7, 9–11, 11–4, 11–9

30 July 2022; 9:30	Australia	3–0	Maldives	National Exhibition Centre, Birmingham

REPORT	Individual matches
Jee Minhyung / Jian Fang Lay	3–0	Aishath Rafa Nazim / Fathimath Jumana Nimal	11–4, 11–6, 11–6
Liu Yangzi	3–0	Fathimath Dheema Ali	11–2, 11–6, 11–3
Jee Minhyung	3–0	Aishath Rafa Nazim	11–6, 11–3, 11–5

30 July 2022; 9:30	Mauritius	0–3	Malaysia	National Exhibition Centre, Birmingham

report	Individual matches
Nandeshwaree Jalim / Ruqayyah Kinoo	1–3	Tee Ai Xin / Karen Lyne	11–9, 2–11, 5–11, 5–11
Oumehani Hosenally	0–3	Chang Li Sian Alice	5–11, 9–11, 4–11
Nandeshwaree Jalim	0–3	Karen Lyne	11–13, 9–11, 6–11

=== Group 4 ===
Qualified for knockout stage

Team	Pld	TW	TL	MW	ML	GW	GL	PW	PL	Pts
Wales	3	3	0	9	2	27	6	324	194	6
Canada	3	2	1	8	3	24	9	328	216	5
Uganda	3	0	3	3	6	9	18	201	244	3
Vanuatu	3	0	3	0	9	0	27	98	297	3

29 July 2022; 12:00	Vanuatu	0–3	Wales	National Exhibition Centre, Birmingham

report	Individual matches
Stephanie Qwea / Tracey Mawa	0–3	Chloe Thomas Wu Zhang / Anna Hursey	1–11, 2–11, 5–11
Roanna Abel	0–3	Charlotte Carey	1–11, 4–11, 2–11
Tracey Mawa	0–3	Anna Hursey	1–11, 2–11, 3–11

29 July 2022; 9:30	Canada	3–0	Uganda	National Exhibition Centre, Birmingham

report	Individual matches
Zhang Mo / Katherine Morin	3–0	Judith Nangonzi / Jemimah Nakawala	11–6, 11–6, 11–8
Sophie Gauthier	3–0	Florence Seera	11–4, 11–6, 12–10
Katherine Morin	3–0	Jemimah Nakawala	11–4, 11–8, 11–6

29 July 2022; 16:00	Canada	3–0	Vanuatu	National Exhibition Centre, Birmingham

result	Individual matches
Zhang Mo / Sophie Gauthier	3–0	Roanna Abel / Tracey Mawa	11–3, 11–5, 11–2
Fu Ching Nam	3–0	Stephanie Qwea	11–6, 11–5, 11–4
Sophie Gauthier	3–0	Tracey Mawa	11–0, 11–2, 11–5

29 July 2022; 16:00	Uganda	0–3	Wales	National Exhibition Centre, Birmingham

report	Individual matches
Judith Nangonzi / Jemimah Nakawala	0–3	Lara Whitton / Anna Hursey	5–11, 5–11, 9–11
Florence Seera	0–3	Charlotte Carey	3–11, 8–11, 5–11
Judith Nangonzi	0–3	Anna Hursey	2–11, 2–11, 5–11

30 July 2022; 9:30	Canada	2–3	Wales	National Exhibition Centre, Birmingham

report	Individual matches
Fu Ching Nam / Sophie Gauthier	0–3	Chloe Thomas Wu ZhangLara Whitton / Anna Hursey	7–11, 9–11, 6–11
Zhang Mo	3–0	Charlotte Carey	11–3, 11–8, 11–9
Fu Ching Nam	0–3	Anna Hursey	9–11, 7–11, 8–11
Zhang Mo	3–0	Chloe Thomas Wu ZhangLara Whitton	11–3, 11–1, 11–3
Sophie Gauthier	0–3	Charlotte Carey	5–11, 6–11, 5–11

30 July 2022; 9:30	Vanuatu	0–3	Uganda	National Exhibition Centre, Birmingham

	Individual matches
Roanna Abel / Tracey Mawa	0–3	Judith Nangonzi / Jemimah Nakawala	7–11, 4–11, 5–11
Stephanie Qwea	0–3	Florence Seera	6–11, 7–11, 2–11
Tracey Mawa	0–3	Jemimah Nakawala	2–11, 7–11, 5–11

== Knockout stage ==
=== Bracket ===
Quarterfinals
30 July
Singapore	3
Guyana	0
30 July
Canada	0
Australia	3
30 July
Wales	3
England	0
30 July
Malaysia	3
India	2

Semifinals
31 July
Singapore	3
Australia	0
31 July
Wales	2
Malaysia	3

Final
Singapore	3
Malaysia	0
Bronze medal
Australia	3
Wales	0

=== Quarterfinals ===
30 July 2022; 18:30	Singapore	3–0	Guyana	National Exhibition Centre, Birmingham

report	Individual matches
Zhou JingYi / Zeng Jian	3–0	Natalie Cummings / Chealsea Edghill	11―5, 11―8, 11―6
Feng Tianwei	3–0	Priscilla Greaves	11―3, 11―1, 11―4
Zeng Jian	3–0	Chealsea Edghill	11―5, 11―4, 11―2

30 July 2022; 16:00	Canada	0–3	Australia	National Exhibition Centre, Birmingham

report	Individual matches
Zhang Mo / Fu Ching Nam	2–3	Jee Minhyung / Jian Fang Lay	13―11, 11―8, 8―11, 7―11, 4―11
Katherine Morin	0–3	Liu Yangzi	7―11, 5―11, 3―11
Fu Ching Nam	0–3	Jian Fang Lay	3―11, 2―11, 3―11

30 July 2022; 18:30	Wales	3–0	England	National Exhibition Centre, Birmingham

report	Individual matches
Chloe Thomas Wu Zhang / Anna Hursey	3–1	Charlotte Bardsley / Maria Tsaptsinos	11―3, 5―11, 11―9, 11―9
Charlotte Carey	3–1	Tin-Tin Ho	14―12, 6―11, 11―5, 11―6
Anna Hursey	3–0	Maria Tsaptsinos	11―8, 11―9, 11―4

30 July 2022; 16:00	Malaysia	3–2	India	National Exhibition Centre, Birmingham

report	Individual matches
Karen Lyne / Chang Li Sian Alice	3–1	Reeth Tennison / Sreeja Akula	11―7, 11―6, 5―11, 11―6
Ho Ying	2–3	Manika Batra	8―11, 5―11, 11―8, 11―9, 3―11
Chang Li Sian Alice	0–3	Sreeja Akula	6―11, 6―11, 9―11
Karen Lyne	3–0	Manika Batra	11―6, 11―3, 11―9
Ho Ying	3–2	Reeth Tennison	10―12, 11―8 ,10-12, 11―9, 11―9

=== Semifinals ===
31 July 2022; 16:00	Singapore	3–0	Australia	National Exhibition Centre, Birmingham

report	Individual matches
Zhou JingYi / Zeng Jian	3–1	Jee Minhyung / Jian Fang Lay	11―3, 13―11, 10―12, 11―4
Feng Tianwei	3–1	Liu Yangzi	14―12, 6―11, 11―5, 11―5
Zeng Jian	3–0	Jian Fang Lay	11-5, 12-10, 11―8

31 July 2022; 18:30	Wales	2–3	Malaysia	National Exhibition Centre, Birmingham

report	Individual matches
Chloe Thomas Wu Zhang / Anna Hursey	0–3	Ho Ying / Karen Lyne	7―11, 5―11, 5―11
Charlotte Carey	3–2	Chang Li Sian Alice	7―11, 11―8, 11―7, 7―11, 11―7
Anna Hursey	3–1	Karen Lyne	11―6, 11―9, 11―13, 11―9
Chloe Thomas Wu Zhang	0–3	Chang Li Sian Alice	3―11, 11―13, 5―11
Charlotte Carey	2–3	Ho Ying	11―7, 9―11, 12―10, 7―11, 8―11

=== Bronze medal ===
1 August 2022; 9:30	Australia (bronze)	3–0	Wales	National Exhibition Centre, Birmingham

	Individual matches
Jee Minhyung / Jian Fang Lay	3–0	Chloe Thomas Wu Zhang / Charlotte Carey	11–5, 11–5, 11–8
Liu Yangzi	3–0	Anna Hursey	15–13, 11–9, 11–9
Jian Fang Lay	3–0	Charlotte Carey	11–7, 12–10, 11–4

=== Final ===
1 August 2022; 12:00	Singapore (gold)	3–0	Malaysia (silver)	National Exhibition Centre, Birmingham

report	Individual matches
Zhou Jingyi / Zeng Jian	3–1	Karen Lyne / Ho Ying	7-11,11-4,11-6,11-5
Feng Tianwei	3–0	Chang Li Sian Alice	11-9, 11-1, 11-7
Zeng Jian	3–1	Ho Ying	11-3,11-4,8-11,11-5
