= Senegal at the 2023 African Games =

- Flag of Senegal
- IOC code: SEN
- NOC: Senegalese National Olympic and Sports Committee

in Accra, Ghana 8 March 2024 – 23 March 2024
- Competitors: 98 in 11 sports
- Medals Ranked 12th: Gold 4 Silver 7 Bronze 18 Total 29

African Games appearances (overview)
- 1965; 1973; 1978; 1987; 1991; 1995; 1999; 2003; 2007; 2011; 2015; 2019; 2023

Senegal competed at the 2023 African Games held from 8 to 23 March 2024 in Accra, Ghana. Senegal competed in 11 sports.

== Medal table ==
Medal	Name	Sport	Event	Date
Gold	Monica Sagna	Judo	Women's +78 kg	14 March
Gold	Mouhamadou Mansour Lô	Taekwondo	Men's −68 kg	18 March
Gold	Louis François Mendy	Athletics	Men's 110 metres hurdles	19 March
Gold	Adama Ndiaye	Taekwondo	Men's under 30	22 March
Silver	Makhtar Diop	Karate	Men's kumite −84 kg	7 March
Silver	Ndéye Yacine Lô; Maïmouna Niang; Aïssatou Simall; Fatou Ndiaye Diop	Karate	Women's kumite team	9 March
Silver	Abderahmane Diao	Judo	Men's −90 kg	14 March
Silver	Mbagnick Ndiaye	Judo	Men's +100 kg	14 March
Silver	Bocar Diop	Taekwondo	Men's −63 kg	17 March
Silver	Amath Faye	Athletics	Men's triple jump	20 March
Silver	Aita Ndiaye	Taekwondo	Women's under 30	22 March
Bronze	Ibrahima Diaw	Table tennis	Men's singles	5 March
Bronze	Makhtar Diop	Karate	Men's kumite +84 kg	7 March
Bronze	Maïmouna Niang	Karate	Women's kumite −55 kg	8 March
Bronze	Oumy Diop	Swimming	Women's 50 metre butterfly	10 March
Bronze	Safiétou Goudiaby	Wrestling	Women's freestyle 62 kg	10 March
Bronze	Steven Aimable	Swimming	Men's 50 metre backstroke	11 March
Bronze	Oumy Diop	Swimming	Women's 100 metre butterfly	11 March
Bronze	Omar Faye	Wrestling	Men's freestyle 57 kg	11 March
Bronze	Georgette Sagna	Judo	Women's +78 kg	14 March
Bronze	Yacine Diaw	Taekwondo	Women's −57 kg	18 March
Bronze	Saly Sarr	Athletics	Women's triple jump	19 March
Bronze	Cheikh Diouf	Athletics	Men's 400 metres	20 March
Bronze	Ngone Ndeye	Taekwondo	Women's −46 kg	20 March
Bronze	Alphonse Mendy	Boxing	Men's 71 kg	22 March
Bronze	Diarga Balde	Boxing	Men's +92 kg	22 March
Bronze	Senegal	Football	Men's tournament	22 March
Bronze	Habibou Diallo	Taekwondo	Men's over 17	22 March
Bronze	Adama Ndiaye; Habibou Diallo; Daouda Ndione	Taekwondo	Men's under 30 team	22 March
