= Uganda at the 2003 All-Africa Games =

- IOC code: UGA
- NOC: Uganda Olympic Committee

in Abuja 5 October 2003 – 17 October 2003
- Medals Ranked 26th: Gold 0 Silver 1 Bronze 4 Total 5

All-Africa Games appearances
- 1965; 1973; 1978; 1987; 1991; 1995; 1999; 2003; 2007; 2011; 2015; 2019; 2023

Uganda competed in the 2003 All-Africa Games which took place at the National Stadium in the city of Abuja, Nigeria. Uganda sent a substantial delegation and entered thirty three events, some, like the women's 100 and 200 metres, with more than one competitor. The team won five medals and came twenty-sixth in the final medal table. Dorcus Inzikuru won a silver medal in the women's 5000 metres. The individual bronze medals were won by Ajambo Irene in weightlifting and the boxing team of Jolly Kotongole and Sadat Tebazalwa. In team events, the Ugandan women's team were awarded a bronze medal in softball.

== Competitors ==
Uganda entered thirty-three events, twenty-one for men and twelve for women. Amongst the team events, the baseball team came fourth, an improvement on their sixth position at the previous games. Allan Otim was the tournament leader in steals. In the individual events, Boniface Toroitich Kiprop, Dorcus Inzikuru, Justine Bayiga and Veronica Wabukawo all took part in two races. Bayiga and Wabukawo ran against each other in the 100 and 200 metres. Kiprop entered both the 10000 and 5000 metres, while Inzikuru participated in both 5000 and 800 metres. Olympian Paskar Owor entered the 800 metres. Jolly Kotongole and Sadat Tebazalwa competed in the boxing tournament. However, they were almost barred from entering due to non-payment of affiliation fees. Only the actions of Ugandan boxing official Sande Musoke enabled the bouts to happen when he surrendered his allowances to cover the costs.

== Medal summary ==
Uganda won five medals, a silver and four bronze medals, and was ranked twenty-sixth in the final medal table.

=== Medal table ===
Sport	Gold	Silver	Bronze	Total
Athletics	0	1	0	1
Boxing	0	0	2	2
Softball	0	0	1	1
Weightlifting	0	0	1	1
Total	0	1	4	5

== List of Medalists ==
=== Silver Medal ===
Medal	Name	Sport	Event	Date	Ref
Silver	Dorcus Inzikuru	Athletics	Women's 5000 metres	11 October 2003	

=== Bronze Medal ===
Medal	Name	Sport	Event	Date	Ref
Bronze	Jolly Kotongole	Boxing	Light Flyweight (– 48 kilograms)	11 October 2003	
Bronze	Sadat Tebazalwa	Boxing	Light Welterweight (– 64 kilograms)	11 October 2003	
Bronze	Uganda	Softball	Women's Softball	14 October 2003	
Bronze	Ajambo Irene	Weightlifting	Women's 69 kg	16 October 2003	

== See also ==
- Uganda at the African Games
