= Uganda at the African Games =

- IOC code: UGA
- NOC: Uganda Olympic Committee
- Medals: Gold 22 Silver 21 Bronze 44 Total 87

African Games appearances (overview)
- 1965; 1973; 1978; 1987; 1991; 1995; 1999; 2003; 2007; 2011; 2015; 2019; 2023

Uganda (UGA) has competed in every African Games since the first in 1965. The country has taken part in every one of the games since. Athletes from Uganda have won a total of eighty-seven medals, including twenty-two gold and twenty-one silver. Uganda are set to host the 2031 African Games, in Kampala.

== Participation ==
Uganda first entered the African Games (then called the All-African Games) in 1965. The team achieved a single silver medla. The country returned the following tournament, and came away with six gold, three silver and three bronze medals. Uganda has since taken part in and won medals at each of the subsequent games. Involvement has not been smooth, however. In 2003, boxers Jolly Kotongole and Sadat Tebazalwa were almost barred from entering the tournament due to non-payment of affiliation fees. Only the actions of Ugandan boxing official Sande Musoke enabled the competition to happen when he surrendered his allowances to cover the costs.

== Medal tables ==
=== Medals by Games ===
Below is a table representing all the medals won by Uganda at the Games.

Games	Athletes	Gold	Silver	Bronze	Total	Rank
(Republic of the Congo) 1965 Brazzaville		0	1	4	5	14
(Nigeria) 1973 Lagos		6	3	3	12	4
(Algeria) 1978 Algiers		3	6	5	14	9
(Kenya) 1987 Nairobi		3	2	4	9	9
(Egypt) 1991 Cairo		1	1	2	4	17
(Zimbabwe) 1995 Harare		0	0	2	2	31
(South Africa) 1999 Johannesburg		2	1	3	6	15
(Nigeria) 2003 Abuja		0	1	4	5	26
(Algeria) 2007 Algiers		1	0	1	2	23
(Mozambique) 2011 Maputo		4	1	3	8	14
(Republic of the Congo) 2015 Brazzaville		0	0	2	2	26
(Morocco) 2019 Rabat		0	2	8	10	28
(Ghana) 2023 Accra		0	4	6	10	20
(Egypt) 2027 Cairo	To be determined					
(Uganda) 2031 Kampala	To be determined					
Total		26	27	64	107	

== See also ==
- Uganda at the Olympics
- Uganda at the Paralympics
- Sport in Uganda
