= Guinea-Bissau at the 2023 African Games =

- Flag of Guinea-Bissau
- IOC code: GBS
- NOC: Guinea-Bissau Olympic Committee

in Accra, Ghana 8 March 2024 – 23 March 2024
- Medals Ranked 41st: Gold 0 Silver 0 Bronze 1 Total 1

African Games appearances
- 1999; 2003; 2007; 2011; 2015; 2019; 2023

Guinea-Bissau competed at the 2023 African Games held from 8 to 23 March 2024 in Accra, Ghana.

== Medal table ==
| Medal | Name | Sport | Event | Date |
|---|---|---|---|---|
| Bronze | Bacar N'Dum | Wrestling | Men's freestyle 74 kg | 11 March |
