= Uganda at the 2007 All-Africa Games =

- IOC code: UGA
- NOC: Uganda Olympic Committee

in Algiers 11 July 2007 – 23 July 2007
- Medals: Gold 1 Silver 0 Bronze 1 Total 2

All-Africa Games appearances
- 1965; 1973; 1978; 1987; 1991; 1995; 1999; 2003; 2007; 2011; 2015; 2019; 2023

Uganda competed in the 2007 All-Africa Games held at the Stade du 5 Juillet in the city of Algiers, Algeria. The country received two medals, including a gold in long-distance running. It was the first time that the country had won a medal in badminton, receiving a bronze in the men's singles.

== Medal summary ==
Uganda won a gold and a bronze at the games. Moses Kipsiro won gold in the 5000 metres event, despite losing a shoe during the race. His winning time was 13 hours 12 minutes and 51 seconds. The other medal was in badminton, the first in the history of the African Games. Edwin Ekiring was beaten by Nabil Lasmari of Algeria in the semi-final in straight sets 21–17, 21–14 to receive the bronze medal in the men's singles.

== List of Medalists ==
=== Medal table ===
Sport	Gold	Silver	Bronze	Total
Athletics	1	0	0	1
Badminton	0	0	1	1
Total	1	0	1	2

=== Gold Medal ===
Medal	Name	Sport	Event	Date	Ref
Gold	Moses Kipsiro	Athletics	5000 metres		

=== Bronze Medal ===
Medal	Name	Sport	Event	Date	Ref
Bronze	Edwin Ekiring	Badminton	Men's singles		

== See also ==
- Uganda at the African Games
