= Athletics at the 2003 All-Africa Games – Women's 5000 metres =

The women's 5000 metres at the 2003 All-Africa Games were held on October 11.

== Results ==
Rank	Name	Nationality	Time	Notes
1st place, gold medalist(s)	Meseret Defar	Ethiopia	16:42.00	
2nd place, silver medalist(s)	Dorcus Inzikuru	Uganda	16:42.90	
3rd place, bronze medalist(s)	Isabella Ochichi	Kenya	16:43.40	
4	Tirunesh Dibaba	Ethiopia	16:43.40	
5	Sentayehu Ejigu	Ethiopia	16:45.20	
6	Edith Masai	Kenya	16:52.90	
7	Catherine Chikwakwa	Malawi	16:55.60	
8	Simret Sultan	Eritrea	17:00.40	
9	Anesie Kwizera	Burundi	17:06.00	
10	Poppy Mlambo	South Africa	17:10.20	
11	Christiana Augustine	Nigeria	17:28.50	
12	Celma Bonfim da Graça	São Tomé and Príncipe	18:35.18	
