= Table tennis at the African Games =

- Table tennis
- Frequency: Every four years
- Inaugurated: 1973 (Nigeria) Lagos
- Most recent: 2023 (Ghana) Accra

Table tennis has been part of the African Games since 1973 in Lagos, Nigeria.

== Editions ==
Games	Year	Host city	Events			Best nation
Games	Year	Host city	Men	Women	Mixed	Best nation
I	1973	(Nigeria) Lagos	3	3	1	Nigeria
II	1978	(Algeria) Algiers	3	3	1	Nigeria
III	1987	(Kenya) Nairobi	3	3	1	Nigeria
IV	1991	(Egypt) Cairo	3	3	1	Nigeria
V	1995	(Zimbabwe) Harare	3	3	1	Nigeria
VI	1999	(South Africa) Johannesburg	3	3	1	Nigeria
VII	2003	(Nigeria) Abuja	3	3	1	Nigeria
VIII	2007	(Algeria) Algiers	3	3	1	Nigeria
IX	2011	(Mozambique) Maputo	3	3	1	Egypt
X	2015	(Republic of the Congo) Brazzaville	3	3	1	Egypt
XI	2019	(Morocco) Rabat	3	3	1	Egypt
XII	2023	(Ghana) Accra	3	3	1	Egypt

== Events ==
There are seven events: Men's singles, Men's doubles, Men's team, Women's singles, Women's doubles, Women's team and Mixed doubles. All seven of these events have been run at every edition of the Games.
