= Ibrahima Diaw (table tennis) =

Senegalese table tennis player (born 1992)

Ibrahima Diaw OLY
Personal information
- Nationality: Senegalese
- Born: 9 July 1992 (age 34) Paris, France

Sport
- Country: Senegal (1992-2026} Denmark (2026-)
- Sport: Table tennis
Medal record
Men's table tennis
Representing Senegal
African Games
Bronze medal – third place	2023 Accra	Singles

Ibrahima Diaw OLY (born 9 July 1992) is a Senegalese table tennis player. He competed in the 2020 Summer Olympics.

Diaw was born in France to a Senegalese father and a Malian mother. He grew up in Paris and competed for France at the junior level.

In 2026, Diaw announced his change in nationality to Denmark
