= Fabio Rakotoarimanana =

Malagasy table tennis player (born 2003)

Personal information
- Born: 24 July 2003 (age 23)

Sport
- Sport: Table tennis
- Club: Lille Métropole TT (Pro B)
- Playing style: Right-handed, shakehand grip
- Highest ranking: 146 (19 March 2024)
- Current ranking: 153 (30 July 2024)
Medal record
Men's table tennis
Representing Madagascar
African Games
Bronze medal – third place	2023 Accra	Mixed doubles
African Championships
Gold medal – first place	2023 Rades	Doubles
Francophone Games
Silver medal – second place	2023 Kinshasa	Singles
East African Championships
Gold medal – first place	2023 Djibouti	Singles
Gold medal – first place	2023 Djibouti	Team
Gold medal – first place	2024 Kampala	Singles
Gold medal – first place	2024 Kampala	Team
Representing France
European Youth Championships
Gold medal – first place	2018 Cluj-Napoca	Team (cadet)
Silver medal – second place	2018 Cluj-Napoca	Mixed doubles (cadet)
Bronze medal – third place	2018 Cluj-Napoca	Doubles (cadet)

Fabio Adrien Rakotoarimanana (born 24 July 2003) is a Malagasy table tennis player. He represented France in his youth before switching allegiances to compete for his home country in 2022. After winning several international medals, Rakotoarimanana qualified for the 2024 Summer Olympics, where he was chosen as a flag-bearer and became Madagascar's first Olympic table tennis player.

== Career ==
=== Career in France ===
A native of Madagascar, Rakotoarimanana grew up in the port city of Toulon, France, and began playing table tennis at the age of seven. At the 2014 French national championships, while competing in the benjamins (under-11) category, he won the silver medal in the singles event, and partnered with Alexis Lebrun to win gold in doubles. In 2015, the pair of Rakotoarimanana and Lebrun won a bronze in the doubles event in the minimes (under-13) category, followed by a silver-medal doubles finish in 2016. In cadets (under-15) competition, Rakotoarimanana teamed with Myshaal Sabhi to win gold in the doubles at the 2018 national championships.

In April 2018, Rakotoarimanana partnered with Félix Lebrun to win the cadets boys' doubles title at the Belgium Junior and Cadet Open. He also won a silver in the team event and a bronze in the singles. In July, Rakotoarimanana competed in the cadets category at the European Youth Championships in Romania, where he won a gold in the boys' team, silver in the mixed doubles (with Prithika Pavade), and bronze in the boys' doubles. At the 2019 French national championships - now in the juniors category - Rakotoarimanana won a bronze medal in the singles competition. He competed at the European Youth Championships in the Czech Republic that year, though he did not medal.

At the club level, Rakotoarimanana played for Le Garde TT and Lille Métropole TT. He helped the latter reach the semifinals of the 2024 ETTU Europe Trophy, where they lost to the eventual champions, Panathinaikos.

=== Switch to Madagascar ===
In a 2018 interview, Rakotoarimanana expressed his desire to represent Madagascar in international competition. In December 2022, his father announced that he had accepted an invitation from the Malagasy Table Tennis Federation to switch allegiances and join his home country's national team. Rakotoarimanana made his international debut for Madagascar at the East African Championships held in Djibouti in March 2023. He won the gold medal in the men's singles – beating compatriot Antoine Razafinarivo 4–0 in the final – and another gold in the men's team competition. At the ITTF Africa Cup in May, Rakotoarimanana won all three group stage matches before losing to Sami Kherouf in the round of 32 and finishing 13th in the placement round.

Rakotoarimanana was selected as a flag-bearer for Madagascar at the opening ceremony of the 2023 Francophone Games, where he took silver in the singles event after losing to Eduard Ionescu in the final. He was set to take part the 2023 Indian Ocean Island Games in Madagascar later that month, but his eligibility was revoked after the Mauritius Table Tennis Association filed a complaint alleging that he (and two other Malagasy athletes) did not meet the necessary residency requirements to compete at the Games.

On 17 September 2023, Rakotoarimanana partnered with Antoine Razafinarivo to win the men's doubles title at the African Championships in Tunisia, clinching the gold medal with a 3–1 win over the local pair of Youssef Ben Attia and Aboubaker Bourass in the final. They previously upset the Egyptian pair of Ahmed Saleh and Mohamed El-Beiali 3–2 in the semi-final. In the men's singles event, Rakotoarimanana advanced to the quarterfinals, where he was eliminated by Olajide Omotayo.

In February 2024, Rakotoarimanana competed at the 2024 World Team Table Tennis Championships, where he won three of his six individual matches. Notably, he beat Olajide Omotayo 3–0 to secure Madagascar's 3–1 upset victory over Nigeria in the group stage. In March, Rakotoarimanana competed at the postponed 2023 African Games and won a bronze medal in the mixed doubles event with Hanitra Raharimanana. Then, in April, Rakotoarimanana took gold in both the singles and team events at the East African Championships.

In May 2024, Rakotoarimanana qualified for the 2024 Summer Olympics by defeating Wassim Essid at the ITTF Africa Olympic Qualification Tournament, 4–3. He became the first Malagasy table tennis player to ever qualify for the Olympics.`At the Summer Olympics in Paris, Rakotoarimanana was defeated by Omar Assar in the round of 64 of the men's singles event, 1–4.

== See also ==
- List of flag bearers for Madagascar at the Olympics

Olympic Games
Preceded by Mialitiana Clerc; Mathieu Neumuller	Flagbearer for Madagascar; Paris 2024 with Rosina Randafiarison	Succeeded by Incumbent
