= Fadwa Garci =

Tunisian table tennis player (born 2002)

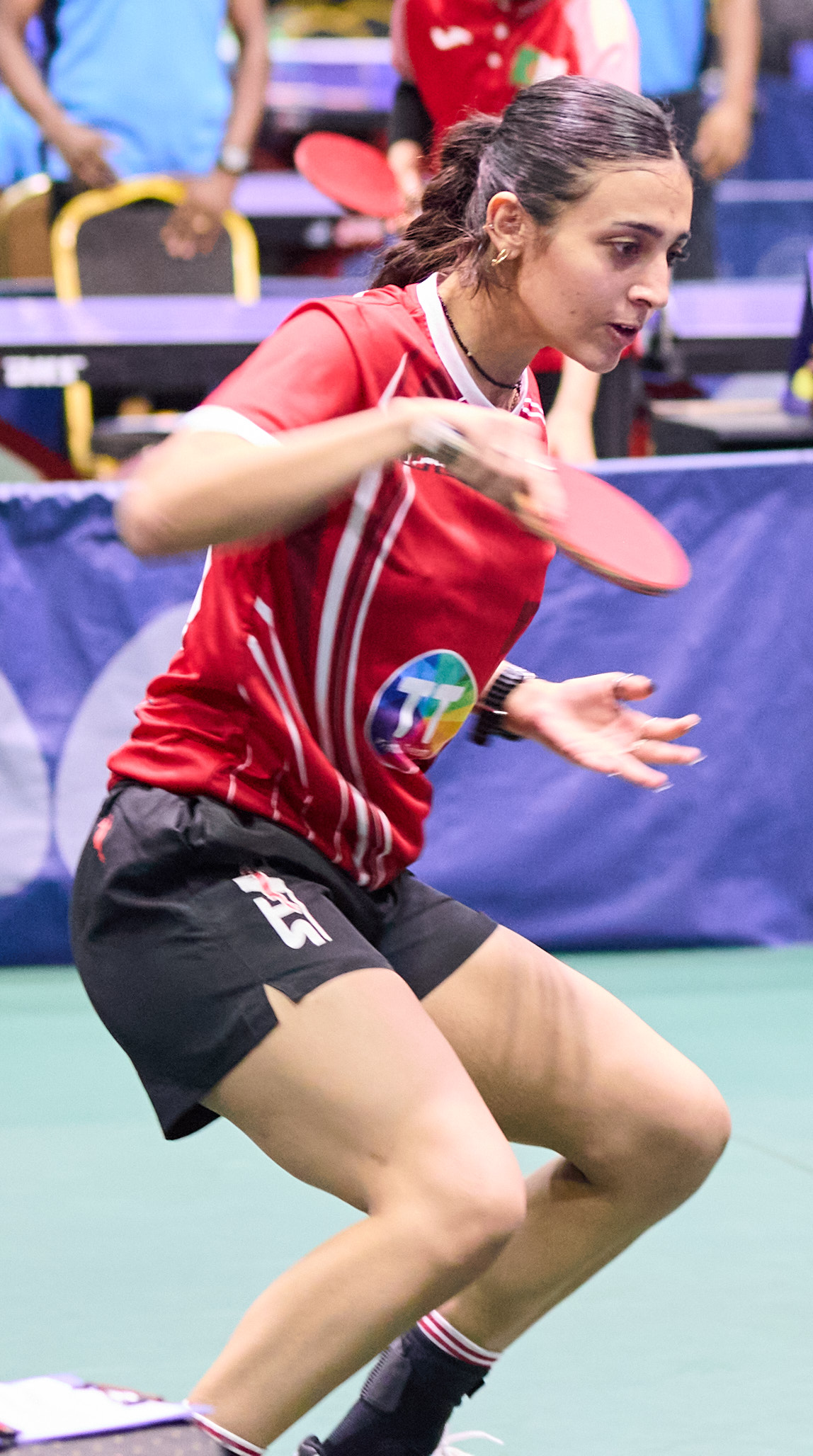

Personal information
- Full name: Fadwa Garci
- Born: 6 February 2002 (age 24) Tunis, Tunisia

Sport
- Country: Tunisia
- Sport: Table tennis
Medal record
Women's table tennis
Representing Tunisia
African Games
Silver medal – second place	2023 Accra	Doubles
Bronze medal – third place	2019 Rabat	Team
Bronze medal – third place	2023 Accra	Team

Fadwa Garci (born 6 February 2002) is a Tunisian table tennis player. She competed in the 2020 Summer Olympics.
