= Musfiquh Kalam =

South African table tennis player (born 2002)

Personal information
- Born: 1 May 2002 (age 24) South Africa
- Height: 160 cm (5 ft 3 in)
- Weight: 62 kg (137 lb)
Medal record
Women's table tennis
Representing South Africa
African Games
Bronze medal – third place	2023 Accra	Team

Musfiquh Kalam (born 1 May 2002) is a South African table tennis player.

== Background ==
Kalam attended Trafalgar High School in Cape Town, South Africa. She became a women's champion at the age of 12. She has won the women's singles title at the Southern African Regional Championships twice.

== Championships ==
Year	Tournament	Event	Result
2016	World Junior Table Tennis Championships		19th place
2018	African Union Sport Commission Region Five	Women’s Singles title	Won
2018	ITTF Africa Top 16 Cup		Lost
2022	Commonwealth Games	Single, Mixed Doubles	Ongoing
