= Esther Oribamise =

Nigerian para table tennis player (born 2001)

Personal information
- Full name: Esther Tosin Oribamise
- Nationality: Nigerian
- Born: 27 November 2001 (age 24) Ado Ekiti, Nigeria

Sport
- Country: Nigeria
- Sport: Table Tennis
Medal record
Women's table tennis
Representing Nigeria
African Games
Silver medal – second place	2023 Accra	Team

Esther Tosin Oribamise (born 27 November 2001) is a Nigerian table tennis player.

She competed for Nigeria at local and international table tennis competitions.

== Achievements ==
Oribamise participated in the table tennis competition at the 2022 Commonwealth Games representing Nigeria.

She also qualified to compete in the Buenos Aires 2018 Youth Olympic Games qualifier in Tunisia by beating Alhodaby Marwa of Egypt to secure the top spot in the competition.

She was part of the Nigerian team alongside Ajoke Ojomu and Alimot Ayinla to secure three bronze medals at the 2015 Egypt Junior and Cadet Table Tennis Open in Cairo.

In 2018, she moved from the rank of 728 to 486 spot in the world according to the International Table Tennis Federation.

She also represented Nigeria at the Africa Junior Championships in Algeria in 2016.
