= Olajide Omotayo =

Professional Nigeria table tennis player

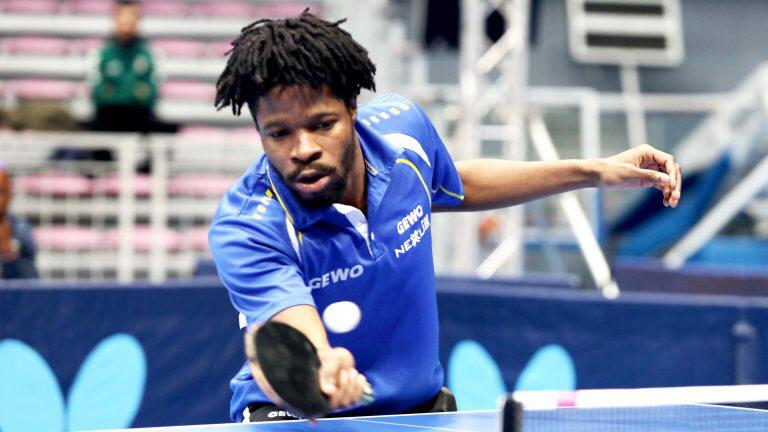
- Omotayo at the African Olympics Qualification Tournament Tunisia 2020

Personal information
- Full name: Olajide Omotayo Adeyemi
- Nickname: Jehdor
- Born: 6 July 1995 (age 31) Lagos, Nigeria

Sport
- Sport: Table tennis
- Playing style: Offensive
- Highest ranking: 85 (December 2019)
- Current ranking: 92 (April 2020)
Medal record
Men's table tennis
Representing Nigeria
African Games
Gold medal – first place	2019 Rabat	Singles
Silver medal – second place	2019 Rabat	Team
Silver medal – second place	2023 Accra	Team
Bronze medal – third place	2019 Rabat	Doubles
Commonwealth Games
Silver medal – second place	2018 Gold Coast	Team
African Championships
Gold medal – first place	2024 Addis Ababa	Team
Silver medal – second place	2024 Addis Ababa	Doubles

Olajide Omotayo Adeyemi (born 6 July 1995 in Lagos) is a Nigerian professional table tennis player based in Italy. He is the youngest of 6 siblings. His peak world ranking to date was 85. He is currently ranked 144 in the International Table Tennis Federation (ITTF) Men Singles World Ranking. He is the current Champion of Africa after defeating Quadri Aruna to win Gold in the Men's Singles at the 2019 African Games, his debut appearance. Olajide is known for his offensive playing style with a strong topspin stroke. In 2017, Olajide secured a five-year sponsorship deal with the German manufacturer of kits, Gewo.

He competed for Nigeria at the 2016 African Championship (doubles event) and the 2018 Gold Coast Commonwealth Games in Australia, winning Bronze and silver, respectively.

His first international appearance for Nigeria was in 2008 as a cadet at the 2008 International Table Tennis Federation (ITTF) African Junior and Cadet Championships, which was held in Alexandria, Egypt.

In 2019, he was nominated for the Nigerian Sportsman of the Year Award by the ITTF.

== Early years ==
Olajide attended Pedro Primary School, Famous, Bariga and later, Morocco Comprehensive High School, Igbobi Yaba, Lagos, for his Junior Secondary Education before proceeding to Baptist Senior High School, Obanikoro Palmgroove, for his Senior Secondary School Education.

== Table tennis career ==
Olajide started playing Table Tennis at the age of 8. He was introduced to the game by his sister, Omobolanle Omotayo, a one-time national table tennis champion. He started his career playing for a local club, the Summer Table Tennis club, in his neighbourhood in Somolu Area, Lagos State. He represented his school in the Lagos State Table Tennis Competition for Primary Schools and the National School sports Competition at age 9. He started representing Nigeria at International Competitions at 11. In 2008, he represented Nigeria at the All African Junior Table Tennis Championships in Alexandria Egypt, where he won Bronze.

He has since then established himself as a key member of Nigeria's senior table Tennis Team at several International Tournaments.

He aspires to get to the Top 50 ranked players in the world.

== 2015 African Games ==
Olajide failed to qualify for the 2015 African Games after losing a crucial game during the trials. He couldn't return to his club in Italy at the time and was on the verge of quitting Table Tennis completely. Quadri Aruna's record-breaking qualification for the Rio 2016's Olympic Games quarter-finals gave him hope to fight back.

== 2018 Commonwealth Games ==
Olajide was one of the five male Table Tennis players selected to represent Nigeria at the 2018 Commonwealth Games. The Nigerian team included Bode Abiodun, Azeez Jamiu, Quadri Aruna, and veteran player, Segun Toriola.

Nigeria won silver at the end of the competition after losing to the Indian Team consisting of Sharath Kamal, Sathiyan Gnanasekaran and Harmeet Desai in the finals.

== 2018 African Championship in Mauritius ==
Olajide featured in the 2018 African Championship in Mauritius, representing Nigeria. He made it to the semi-finals after beating Togo's Atarou Assou and Angola's Elizandro André. He had a stunning outing as he defeated Egypt's no.3 seed, Mohamed El-Beiali and Shady Magdy, to make it to the semi-final round. Olajide lost to compatriot Quadri Aruna.

== 2019 ITTF World Team Cup ==
The Nigerian Team represented by Quadri Aruna, Olajide Omotayo and Bode Abiodun played against Team China in Group A at the 2019 ITTF Team World Cup. Olajide lost 3–0 to world number 10, Yun-Ju Lin in the game.

In the doubles match, Quadri and Olajide played against Cheng-Ting Liao and Chen Chien-an and lost (2-1). The Nigerian team lost (3-1) overall to exit the 2019 ITTF Team World Cup, which was held in Tokyo, Japan. Chinese Taipei finished second in the Group while Nigeria exited, bagging the third spot.

== 2019 African Games ==
At the 2019 African Games, which was held in Rabat Morocco, Olajide was up against three of the best players in Africa to become the continent's champion. He played against two former champions – Egypt's Ahmed Saleh and Nigeria's Segun Toriola in the quarterfinal and semifinal stages.

The final was a classic with one of his role models in the game and the then highest-ranked African table tennis player, Quadri Aruna. Omotayo raced to the lead with a 3-0 (13-11, 11–9, 16–14). The more experienced Quadri had a good comeback in the 4th and 5th games cutting the lead to 3–2 with 8–11, 13–15. Omotayo scaled through with a 12–10 win to claim his first international gold medal.

== 2020 Tokyo Olympics (2021) ==
Omotayo qualified for Men's Singles at the 2020 Tokyo Olympics. The Games were rescheduled to 2021 due to the COVID-19 pandemic. He was defeated in four (4) straight sets by Tiago Apolónia in the First Round.

== See also ==
- List of table tennis players
