= Gabon at the 2023 African Games =

- Flag of Gabon
- IOC code: GAB
- NOC: Gabonese Olympic Committee

in Accra, Ghana 8 March 2024 – 23 March 2024
- Competitors: 42 in 9 sports
- Medals Ranked 34th: Gold 0 Silver 1 Bronze 3 Total 4

African Games appearances
- 1965; 1973; 1978; 1987; 1991; 1995; 1999; 2003; 2007; 2011; 2015; 2019; 2023

Gabon competed at the 2023 African Games held from 8 to 23 March 2024 in Accra, Ghana. Gabon competed in 9 sports.

== Medal table ==
Medal	Name	Sport	Event	Date
Silver	Urgence Mouega	Taekwondo	Women's −73 kg	18 March
Bronze	Anthony Obame	Taekwondo	Men's +87 kg	18 March
Bronze	Franck Mombey	Boxing	Men's 54 kg	22 March
Bronze	Symphorien Njinnou	Boxing	Men's 92 kg	22 March
