= Ivory Coast at the 2023 African Games =

- Flag of Ivory Coast
- IOC code: CIV
- NOC: Comité National Olympique de Côte d'Ivoire

in Accra, Ghana 8 March 2024 – 23 March 2024
- Medals Ranked 30th: Gold 0 Silver 9 Bronze 9 Total 18

African Games appearances
- 1965; 1973; 1978; 1987; 1991; 1995; 1999; 2003; 2007; 2011; 2015; 2019; 2023

Ivory Coast competed at the 2023 African Games held from 8 to 23 March 2024 in Accra, Ghana. Ivory Coast competed in 9 sports.

== Medal table ==
Medal	Name	Sport	Event	Date
Silver	Nogona Bakayoko	Wrestling	Women's freestyle 53 kg	10 March
Silver	Amy Youin	Wrestling	Women's freestyle 76 kg	10 March
Silver	Zouleiha Abzetta Dabonne	Judo	Women's −57 kg	12 March
Silver	Bouma Coulibaly	Taekwondo	Women's −53 kg	17 March
Silver	Astan Bathily	Taekwondo	Women's +73 kg	17 March
Silver	Aaron Kobenan	Taekwondo	Men's −68 kg	18 March
Silver	Mariama Cisse	Taekwondo	Women's −57 kg	18 March
Silver	Issa Diakite	Taekwondo	Men's −58 kg	20 March
Silver	Koumba Ibo	Taekwondo	Women's −62 kg	20 March
Bronze	Koffi Kreme Kobena	Judo	Men's −100 kg	14 March
Bronze	Ibrahim Diomande	Taekwondo	Men's −54 kg	17 March
Bronze	Ben Konate	Taekwondo	Men's −63 kg	17 March
Bronze	Abenan Dangnide	Taekwondo	Women's −73 kg	18 March
Bronze	Jean Kouame	Taekwondo	Men's −74 kg	19 March
Bronze	Anicet Kassi	Taekwondo	Men's −87 kg	19 March
Bronze	Nabintou Kone	Taekwondo	Women's −49 kg	19 March
Bronze	Rahima Traore; Manigue Diallo; Yao Emilie Bledja	Taekwondo	Women's under 30 team	22 March
Bronze	Abdoulaziz Bationo; Eliakim Coulibaly; Francky Martial	Tennis	Men's team	23 March
