= Matthew Kuti =

Nigerian table tennis player

Matthew Kuti is a professional Nigerian table tennis player.

== Early life and career ==
Kuti began his table tennis career in Lagos State, where he quickly gained recognition in national competitions. He won the Cadet and Mini-Cadet championships before attracting international attention in 2022 by winning the U-13 and U-11 titles at the WTT Youth Contender in Cairo, Egypt.

Kuti has won four out of five major table tennis tournaments in Nigeria. His recent victories include the 10th Elicris Table Tennis Cup and the Molade Okoya-Thomas Cup.

Internationally, Kuti earned a silver medal at the African Championships in 2024 and 2025, held in Tunis and Addis Ababa, respectively. He also represented Nigeria at the 2023 African Games. He is set to compete in the 2025 African Cup in Tunisia, with the aim of qualifying for the 2025 ITTF World Cup in Macao.

In July 2025, Matthew Kuti emerged as the first West African player to successfully defend the men’s singles title at the 2025 West African Table Tennis championships at the Molade Okoya-Thomas Hall, Teslim Balogun Stadium, Lagos. He reaffirmed his supremacy by overcoming compatriot Abdulbasit Abdulfatai 4-1 (7-11, 11-6, 11-9, 11-7, 11-7) in the final of the Men's Singles.
