= Mehdi Bouloussa =

Algerian table tennis player

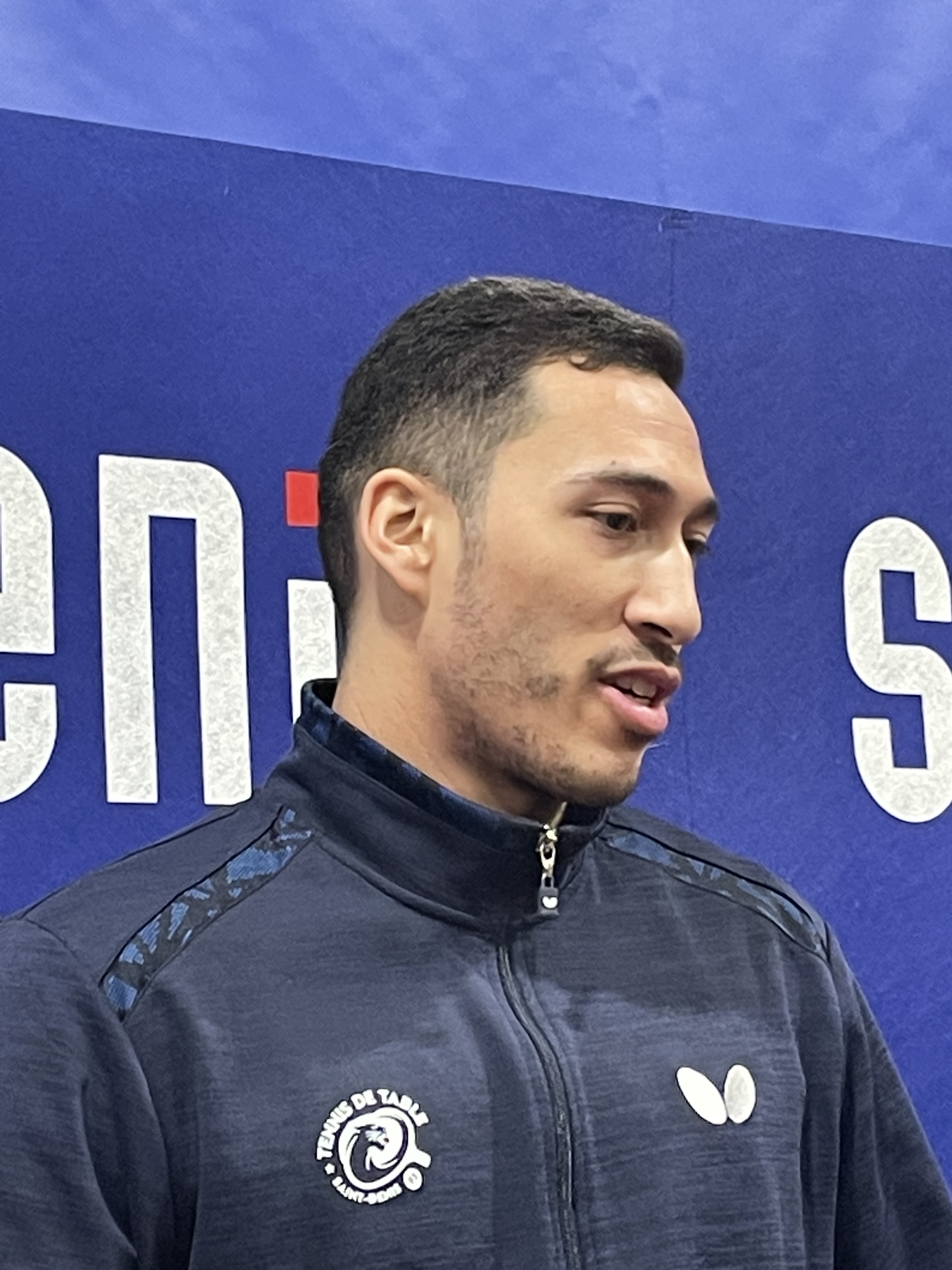

Personal information
- Nationality: Algeria
- Born: 15 May 1995 (age 31) Bobigny, France

Sport
- Sport: Table tennis

Mehdi Bouloussa (born 15 May 1995) is a table tennis player. Born in France, he represents Algeria internationally. He competed in the men's singles event at the 2024 Summer Olympics, where he lost in the Round of 64 to Tomislav Pucar.
