= Guinea at the 2023 African Games =

- Flag of Guinea
- IOC code: GUI
- NOC: Guinean National Olympic and Sports Committee

in Accra, Ghana 8 March 2024 – 23 March 2024
- Medals Ranked 27th: Gold 1 Silver 1 Bronze 0 Total 2

African Games appearances (overview)
- 1973; 1978–1991; 1995; 1999; 2003; 2007; 2011; 2015; 2019; 2023

Guinea competed at the 2023 African Games held from 8 to 23 March 2024 in Accra, Ghana. Guinea competed in 9 sports.

== Medal table ==
Medal	Name	Sport	Event	Date
Gold	Marie Branser	Judo	Women's −78 kg	14 March
Silver	Fatoumata Balley	Athletics	Women's high jump	19 March
