= Angola at the 2023 African Games =

- Flag of Angola
- IOC code: ANG
- NOC: Angolan Olympic Committee

in Accra, Ghana 8 March 2024 – 23 March 2024
- Competitors: 113 in 13 sports
- Medals Ranked 26th: Gold 1 Silver 1 Bronze 3 Total 5

African Games appearances
- 1987; 1991; 1995; 1999; 2003; 2007; 2011; 2015; 2019; 2023

Angola competed at the 2023 African Games held from 8 to 23 March 2024 in Accra, Ghana. Angola competed in 13 sports, but was unable to use national symbols, such as the anthem and flag, due to delays in approving the country's anti-doping law.

== Medal table ==
| Medal | Name | Sport | Event | Date |
|---|---|---|---|---|
| Gold | Angola | Handball | Women's tournament | 22 March |
| Silver | Ednasia Junior | Chess | Women's rapid individual | 10 March |
| Bronze | Rafaela Santo | Swimming | Women's 1500 metre freestyle | 9 March |
| Bronze | Roberto Nsangua | Wrestling | Men's greco-roman 87 kg | 9 March |
| Bronze | Manaceu Ngonda | Wrestling | Men's freestyle 65 kg | 11 March |
