= Madagascar at the 2023 African Games =

- Flag of Madagascar
- IOC code: MAD
- NOC: Malagasy Olympic Committee

in Accra, Ghana 8 March 2024 – 23 March 2024
- Competitors: 41 in 12 sports
- Medals Ranked 15th: Gold 4 Silver 4 Bronze 7 Total 15

African Games appearances
- 1965; 1973; 1978; 1987; 1991; 1995; 1999; 2003; 2007; 2011; 2015; 2019; 2023

Madagascar competed at the 2023 African Games held from 8 to 23 March 2024 in Accra, Ghana. Madagascar competed in 12 sports.

== Medal table ==
Medal	Name	Sport	Event	Date
Gold	Éric Andriantsitohaina	Weightlifting	Men's 55 kg total	10 March
Gold	Éric Andriantsitohaina	Weightlifting	Men's 55 kg snatch	10 March
Gold	Éric Andriantsitohaina	Weightlifting	Men's 55 kg clean & jerk	10 March
Gold	Aina Rasoanaivo Razafy	Judo	Women's −70 kg	13 March
Silver	Ny Hasina Andrimitantsoa	Weightlifting	Women's 49 kg total	10 March
Silver	Fy Antenaina Rakotomaharo	Chess	Men's blitz individual	11 March
Silver	Sidonie Fiadanantsoa	Athletics	Women's 100 metres hurdles	20 March
Silver	Madagascar	Rugby sevens	Women's tournament	21 March
Bronze	Fenosoa Rakotobe	Karate	Women's kumite −50 kg	8 March
Bronze	Fy Antenaina Rakotomaharo; Aina Mahasambatra	Chess	Mixed rapid team	9 March
Bronze	Fabio Rakotoarimanana; Hanitra Raharimanana	Table tennis	Mixed doubles	9 March
Bronze	Tiavina Andriamitantsoa	Weightlifting	Women's 45 kg clean & jerk	10 March
Bronze	Ny Hasina Andrimitantsoa	Weightlifting	Women's 49 kg snatch	10 March
Bronze	Ny Hasina Andrimitantsoa	Weightlifting	Women's 49 kg clean & jerk	10 March
Bronze	Natacha Razafindrakalo	Judo	Women's −48 kg	12 March
