= Ethiopia at the 2023 African Games =

- Flag of Ethiopia
- IOC code: ETH
- NOC: Ethiopian Olympic Committee

in Accra, Ghana 8 March 2024 – 23 March 2024
- Competitors: 149 in 9 sports
- Medals Ranked 8th: Gold 9 Silver 8 Bronze 5 Total 22

African Games appearances
- 1965; 1973; 1978; 1987; 1991; 1995; 1999; 2003; 2007; 2011; 2015; 2019; 2023

Ethiopia competed at the 2023 African Games held from 8 to 23 March 2024 in Accra, Ghana. Ethiopia competed in 9 sports.

== Medal table ==
Medal	Name	Sport	Event	Date
Gold	Samuel Firewu	Athletics	Men's 3000 metres steeplechase	18 March
Gold	Medina Eisa	Athletics	Women's 5000 metres	18 March
Gold	Nibret Melak	Athletics	Men's 10000 metres	19 March
Gold	Tsige Duguma	Athletics	Women's 800 metres	19 March
Gold	Misgana Fekansa	Athletics	Men's 20 kilometres walk	20 March
Gold	Hagos Gebrhiwet	Athletics	Men's 5000 metres	22 March
Gold	Hirut Meshesha	Athletics	Women's 1500 metres	22 March
Gold	Betelhem Gayiza	Boxing	Women's 52 kg	22 March
Gold	Betel Dedi	Boxing	Women's 66 kg	22 March
Silver	Kiya Rogora	Cycling	Men's individual time trial U23	15 March
Silver	Birtukan Molla	Athletics	Women's 5000 metres	18 March
Silver	Gemechu Dida	Athletics	Men's 10000 metres	19 March
Silver	Sintayehu Masire	Athletics	Women's 20 kilometres walk	20 March
Silver	Wede Kefale	Athletics	Women's 10000 metres	21 March
Silver	Ermias Girma	Athletics	Men's 1500 metres	22 March
Silver	Hawi Abera	Athletics	Women's 1500 metres	22 March
Silver	Zewditu Aderaw	Athletics	Women's half marathon	22 March
Bronze	Melknat Wudu	Athletics	Women's 5000 metres	18 March
Bronze	Lomi Muleta	Athletics	Women's 3000 metres steeplechase	20 March
Bronze	Abera Alemu	Athletics	Men's pole vault	21 March
Bronze	Tekan Behre	Athletics	Women's 10000 metres	21 March
Bronze	Neka Temesgen	Boxing	Men's 75 kg	22 March
