= Accra International Conference Centre =

Events venue in Accra, Ghana

Coordinates: 5.5543°N 0.1933°W

- AICC
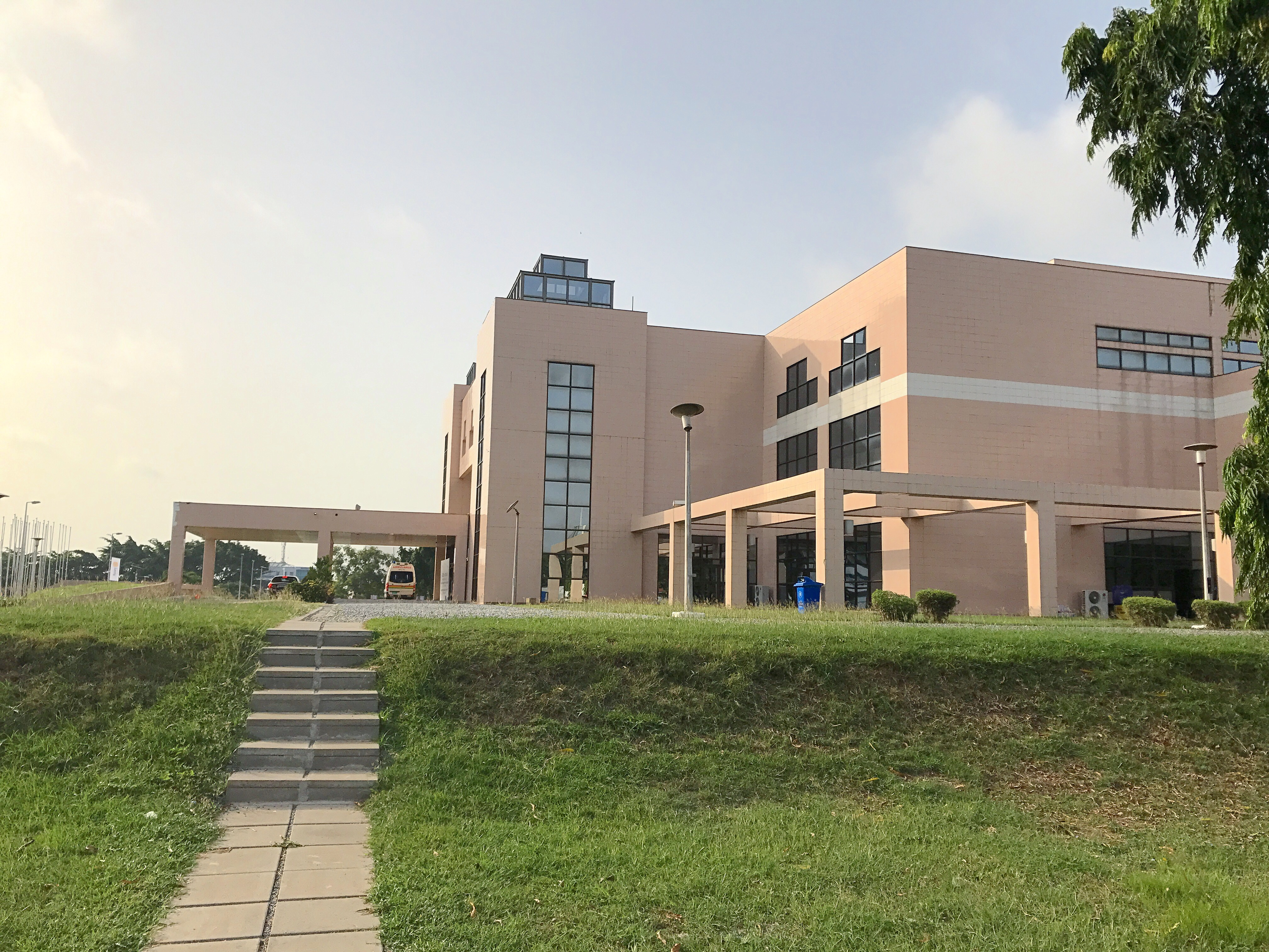
- The Accra International Conference Center

- Location within Ghana
- Location: Accra, Ghana
- Capacity: 1600

Construction
- Opened: 1991

The Accra International Conference Centre is an events venue in Accra, Ghana. Other venues include the Ghana Trade Fair Center and the National Theatre, but the Conference Centre is the most popular due to its size and capacity as compared to the National Theatre, and at the same time smaller than the Ghana Trade Fair Centre (which was built to host pan-African events).

== Location ==
It is located in the Christiansborg area in Accra Osu and is close to a number of important locations such as the Parliament of Ghana, the Accra Sports Stadium, the Independence Square and the Black Star Square.

== Events ==
The Accra International Conference Centre hosted several events over the years including Ghana Music Awards (TGMA 2026) at its Grand Arena.
