= Republic of the Congo at the 2023 African Games =

- Flag of the Republic of the Congo
- IOC code: CGO
- NOC: Congolese National Olympic and Sports Committee

in Accra, Ghana 8 March 2024 – 23 March 2024
- Medals Ranked 39th: Gold 0 Silver 0 Bronze 5 Total 5

African Games appearances
- 1965; 1973; 1978; 1987; 1991; 1995; 1999; 2003; 2007; 2011; 2015; 2019; 2023

Republic of the Congo competed at the 2023 African Games held from 8 to 23 March 2024 in Accra, Ghana.

== Medal table ==
Medal	Name	Sport	Event	Date
Bronze	Abraham Bikoka	Karate	Men's kumite −75 kg	7 March
Bronze	Abigael Mbemba	Karate	Women's kumite −61 kg	7 March
Bronze	Tahir Abdoulaye; Freddy Ampha; Abraham Bikoka; David Kamba	Karate	Men's kumite team	9 March
Bronze	Chrismie Makosso; Astan Noezi; Abigael Mbemba; Dewe Grace; Beatry Makangath	Karate	Women's kumite team	9 March
Bronze	Natacha Ngoye Akamabi	Athletics	Women's 200 metres	22 March
