= Uganda at the 2023 African Games =

- Flag of Uganda
- IOC code: UGA
- NOC: Uganda Olympic Committee

in Accra, Ghana 8 March 2024 – 23 March 2024
- Medals Ranked 13th: Gold 4 Silver 6 Bronze 10 Total 20

African Games appearances (overview)
- 1965; 1973; 1978; 1987; 1991; 1995; 1999; 2003; 2007; 2011; 2015; 2019; 2023

Uganda competed at the 2023 African Games held from 8 to 23 March 2024 in Accra, Ghana.

== Medal table ==
Medal	Name	Sport	Event	Date
Gold	Husina Kobugabe; Gladys Mbabazi	Badminton	Women's doubles	10 March
Gold	Charles Kagimu	Cycling	Men's individual time trial elite	15 March
Gold	Uganda	Rugby sevens	Men's tournament	21 March
Gold	Uganda	Rugby sevens	Women's tournament	21 March
Silver	Husina Kobugabe	Badminton	Women's singles	10 March
Silver	Davis Niyoyita	Weightlifting	Men's 55 kg total	10 March
Silver	Davis Niyoyita	Weightlifting	Men's 55 kg clean & jerk	10 March
Silver	Halimah Nakaayi	Athletics	Women's 800 metres	19 March
Silver	Peruth Chemutai	Athletics	Women's 3000 metres steeplechase	20 March
Silver	Uganda	Football	Men's tournament	22 March
Bronze	Gloria Muzito	Swimming	Women's 100 metre freestyle	9 March
Bronze	Fadilah Mohamed Rafi	Badminton	Women's singles	10 March
Bronze	Davis Niyoyita	Weightlifting	Men's 55 kg snatch	10 March
Bronze	Josephine Joyce Lalam	Athletics	Women's javelin throw	20 March
Bronze	Uganda	Football	Women's tournament	21 March
Bronze	Ian Lubwama; Marvin Okurut; Peter Obleng; Joel Kayira	3x3 basketball	Men's U23	22 March
Bronze	Innocen Tumusiime	Boxing	Men's 48 kg	22 March
Bronze	Kasim Murungi	Boxing	Men's 57 kg	22 March
Bronze	Muzamir Semuddu	Boxing	Men's 71 kg	22 March
Bronze	Uganda	Cricket	Men's tournament	23 March

== Cricket ==
=== Men's ===
Group play

Pos	Team	Pld	W	L	T	NR	Pts	NRR	Qualification
1	Uganda	3	3	0	0	0	6	3.283	Advanced to the knockout stage
2	Kenya	3	2	1	0	0	4	1.049	Advanced to the knockout stage
3	University Sports South Africa	3	1	2	0	0	2	1.000	
4	Ghana	3	0	3	0	0	0	−5.888	

Source: ESPNcricinfo

17 March 2024
13:50
Scorecard

Uganda; 169/7 (20 overs)	v	Kenya; 97 (16.4 overs)
Roger Mukasa 59 (45); Lucas Oluoch 5/20 (4 overs)		Rakep Patel 42 (35); Alpesh Ramjani 4/17 (3.4 overs)

Uganda won by 72 runs
Achimota Oval B, Accra
Umpires: Iknow Chabi (Zim) and Habib Enesi (Nga)
Player of the match: Dinesh Nakrani (Uga)

- Uganda won the toss and elected to bat.
- Lucas Oluoch (Ken) took his first five-wicket haul in T20Is.
- Roger Mukasa (Uga) scored his 1,000th run in T20Is.

18 March 2024
13:50
Scorecard

Uganda; 194/5 (20 overs)	v	Ghana; 73 (16 overs)
Simon Ssesazi 90 (50); Obed Harvey 5/36 (4 overs)		Richmond Baaleri 27 (35); Juma Miyagi 3/10 (3 overs)

Uganda won by 121 runs
Achimota Oval B, Accra
Umpires: Sarah Dambanevana (Zim) and Isaac Oyieko (Ken)
Player of the match: Simon Ssesazi (Uga)

- Uganda won the toss and elected to bat.
- Lee Nyarko (Gha) made his T20I debut.
- Obed Harvey (Gha) took his first five-wicket haul in T20Is.

20 March 2024
09:30
Scorecard

University Sports South Africa; 95/9 (20 overs)	v	Uganda; 99/8 (20 overs)
George Van Heerden 44 (45); Bilal Hassan 4/10 (4 overs)		Roger Mukasa 41 (54); Lehan Botha 2/15 (4 overs)

Uganda won by 2 wickets
Achimota Oval A, Accra
Umpires: Sarah Dambanevana (Zim) and Percival Sizara (Zim)
Player of the match: Roger Mukasa (Uga)

- University Sports South Africa won the toss and elected to bat.

=== Women's ===
Group play

Pos	Team	Pld	W	L	T	NR	Pts	NRR	Qualification
1	Zimbabwe	3	3	0	0	0	6	1.438	Advanced to the knockout stage
2	Uganda	3	2	1	0	0	4	0.529	Advanced to the knockout stage
3	Kenya	3	1	2	0	0	2	−1.018	
4	Rwanda	3	0	3	0	0	0	−0.975	

Source: ESPNcricinfo

7 March 2024
13:15
Scorecard

Kenya; 63/8 (17 overs)	v	Uganda; 66/4 (16.4 overs)
Melvin Khagoitsa 24 (37); Immaculate Nakisuuyi 2/17 (4 overs)		Gloria Obukor 29* (48); Esther Wachira 1/9 (3 overs)

Uganda won by 6 wickets
Achimota Oval B, Accra
Umpires: Stacy Lackay (SA) and Percival Sizara (Zim)
Player of the match: Immaculate Nakisuuyi (Uga)

- Uganda won the toss and elected to field.
- The match was reduced to 17 overs per side due to rain.

8 March 2024
13:50
Scorecard

Uganda; 72 (20 overs)	v	Zimbabwe; 75/6 (19.4 overs)
Immaculate Nakisuuyi 17 (40); Josephine Nkomo 3/9 (4 overs)		Sharne Mayers 19 (26); Immaculate Nakisuuyi 2/10 (3 overs)

Zimbabwe won by 4 wickets
Achimota Oval A, Accra
Umpires: Adil Kassam (Tan) and Isaac Oyieko (Ken)
Player of the match: Josephine Nkomo (Zim)

- Zimbabwe won the toss and elected to field.

10 March 2024
13:45
Scorecard

Uganda; 106/2 (20 overs)	v	Rwanda; 76/8 (20 overs)
Immaculate Nakisuuyi 57* (56); Alice Ikuzwe 1/10 (4 overs)		Marie Bimenyimana 28 (39); Immaculate Nakisuuyi 4/15 (4 overs)

Uganda won by 30 runs
Achimota Oval B, Accra
Umpires: Iknow Chabi (Zim) and Habib Enesi (Nga)
Player of the match: Immaculate Nakisuuyi (Uga)

- Rwanda won the toss and elected to field.

Semi-finals

11 March 2024
09:30
Scorecard

South Africa Emerging; 122/4 (20 overs)	v	Uganda; 72 (18.4 overs)
Nondumiso Shangase 38 (42); Concy Aweko 2/27 (4 overs)		Esther Iloku 19 (33); Kayla Reyneke 3/13 (4 overs)

South Africa won by 50 runs
Achimota Oval A, Accra
Umpires: Sarah Dambanevana (Zim) and Adil Kassam (Tan)
Player of the match: Nondumiso Shangase (SA)

- Uganda won the toss and elected to field.

Gold medal match

13 March 2024
09:30
Scorecard

Uganda; 76/8 (20 overs)	v	Nigeria; 78/7 (19.2 overs)
Immaculate Nakisuuyi 21 (43); Peculiar Agboya 3/11 (4 overs)		Salome Sunday 37 (50); Janet Mbabazi 2/8 (4 overs)

Nigeria won by 3 wickets
Achimota Oval A, Accra
Umpires: Sarah Dambanevana (Zim) and Stacy Lackay (SA)
Player of the match: Salome Sunday (Nga)

- Nigeria won the toss and elected to field.
- Concy Aweko (Uga) took her 100th wicket in T20Is.
