= 2024 African Championships in Athletics – Men's 200 metres =

Men's 200 metres at the 2024 African Championships in Athletics
- Venue: Japoma Stadium
- Location: Douala, Cameroon
- Dates: 25 June (heats & semi-finals); 26 June (final)
- Competitors: 52 from 28 nations
- Winning time: 20.25

Medalists
gold medal	Joseph Fahnbulleh	Liberia
silver medal	Tapiwanashe Makarawu	Zimbabwe
bronze medal	Emmanuel Eseme	Cameroon

The men's 200 metres event at the 2024 African Championships in Athletics was held on 25 and 26 June in Douala, Cameroon.

== Records ==
Records before the 2024 African Athletics Championships
Record	Athlete (nation)	Time (s)	Location	Date
World record	Usain Bolt (JAM)	19.19	Berlin, Germany	20 August 2009
African record	Letsile Tebogo (BOT)	19.50	London, United Kingdom	23 July 2023
Championship record	Frankie Fredericks (NAM)	19.99	Dakar, Senegal	22 August 1998
World leading	Kenneth Bednarek (USA)	19.67	Doha, Qatar	10 May 2024
African leading	Letsile Tebogo (BOT)	19.71	Nairobi, Kenya	20 April 2024

== Results ==
=== Heats ===
Held on 25 June

Qualification: First 2 of each heat (Q) and the next 6 fastest (q) qualified for the semi-finals.

Wind:
Heat 1: -0.1 m/s, Heat 2: -0.5 m/s, Heat 3: -0.2 m/s, Heat 4: 0.0 m/s, Heat 5: -0.6 m/s, Heat 6: -0.1 m/s, Heat 7: +0.1 m/s, Heat 8: +0.2 m/s, Heat 9: +0.6 m/s

Rank	Heat	Name	Nationality	Time	Notes
1	1	Sinesipho Dambile	South Africa	20.69	Q
2	5	Noah Bibi	Mauritius	20.82	Q
3	4	Abdul-Rasheed Saminu	Ghana	20.88	Q
4	6	Alaba Akintola	Nigeria	20.94	Q
5	2	Tapiwanashe Makarawu	Zimbabwe	21.00	Q
6	2	Hachim Maaroufou	Comoros	21.02	Q
7	9	Raphael Ngaguele Mberlina	Cameroon	21.04	Q
8	3	Joseph Fahnbulleh	Liberia	21.08	Q
9	9	Tumo Stagato van Wyk	Botswana	21.09	Q
10	8	Samuel Waweru	Kenya	21.10	Q
11	4	Fode Sissoko	Mali	21.18	Q
12	7	Emmanuel Eseme	Cameroon	21.21	Q
13	4	Elvis Gaseb	Namibia	21.22	q
14	5	Sibusiso Matsenjwa	Eswatini	21.23	Q
15	5	Adama Jammeh	Gambia	21.25	q
16	3	Dominique Lasconi Mulamba	Democratic Republic of the Congo	21.29	Q
17	9	Patrice Esele Sasa	Democratic Republic of the Congo	21.30	q
18	2	Jacky Yapo Uleich Adzeu	Ivory Coast	21.31	q
19	3	Ngoni Makusha	Zimbabwe	21.32	q
20	4	Sengan Jobe	Gambia	21.36	q
21	3	Mcebo Mkhaliphi	Eswatini	21.37	
21	5	Lionnel Muteba	Democratic Republic of the Congo	21.37	
23	1	Hatago Murere	Namibia	21.45	Q
24	6	Claude Itoungue Bongogne	Cameroon	21.51	Q
24	9	Omar Ndoye	Senegal	21.51	
26	2	Moulaye Sonko	Senegal	21.55	
27	7	Godiraone Lobatlamang	Botswana	21.63	Q
28	7	Dan Kiviasi	Kenya	21.66	
29	1	Kouadio Éric Kouame	Ivory Coast	21.68	
30	4	Jerome Kounou	Benin	21.71	
31	3	Ojulu Kul	Ethiopia	21.76	
32	9	Wissy Frank Hoye Yenda Moukoula	Gabon	21.79	
33	2	Denzel Adem	Seychelles	21.80	
34	1	Mlandvo Maziya	Eswatini	21.81	
35	2	Noah Lawson	Togo	21.83	
36	6	Romeo Manzila Mahambou	Republic of the Congo	21.93	
37	6	Seco Camara	Guinea-Bissau	21.95	
38	1	David Nguema Allogho	Gabon	21.98	
39	8	Sharry Dodin	Seychelles	21.99	Q
40	5	Mike Nyang'au	Kenya	22.04	
41	4	Dylan Sicobo	Seychelles	22.21	
42	2	Melkamu Assefa	Ethiopia	22.31	
43	6	Caleb Adonai	Central African Republic	22.46	
44	4	Ahmed Musa	Ethiopia	22.54	
45	5	Ronaldinho Oliveira	Cape Verde	22.75	
46	7	Ludovic Kilambaye	Chad	23.49	
47	8	Marcos Santos	Angola	23.84	
48	3	Joshan Vencatasamy	Mauritius	23.87	
	2	Gnamien Nehemie N'Goran	Ivory Coast	DQ	TR17.2.3
	5	Rémi Adandjo	Benin	DQ	TR17.2.3
	3	Alieu Joof	Gambia	DNF	
	6	Akeem Sirleaf	Liberia	DNF	
	1	Mamadou Fall Sarr	Senegal	DNS	
	1	Herve Toumandji	Central African Republic	DNS	
	1	Letsile Tebogo	Botswana	DNS	
	3	Abdou Idhat	Senegal	DNS	
	4	Shaun Maswanganyi	South Africa	DNS	
	5	Ahmed Essabai	Libya	DNS	
	6	Kossi Médard Nayo	Togo	DNS	
	7	Seye Ogunlewe	Nigeria	DNS	
	7	Arão Adão Simão	Angola	DNS	
	7	Amara Conte	Guinea	DNS	
	8	Gregorio Ndong Oye	Equatorial Guinea	DNS	
	8	Udodi Onwuzurike	Nigeria	DNS	
	8	Fuseini Ibrahim	Ghana	DNS	
	8	Ibrahima Hamayadji	Cameroon	DNS	
	9	Gilbert Hainuca	Namibia	DNS	

=== Semi-finals ===
Held on 25 June

Qualification: First 2 of each semifinal (Q) and the next 2 fastest (q) qualified for the final.

Wind:
Heat 1: -0.4 m/s, Heat 2: -1.1 m/s, Heat 3: -0.4 m/s

Rank	Heat	Name	Nationality	Time	Notes
1	3	Emmanuel Eseme	Cameroon	20.47	Q
2	3	Abdul-Rasheed Saminu	Ghana	20.52	Q
3	1	Joseph Fahnbulleh	Liberia	20.58	Q
4	2	Tapiwanashe Makarawu	Zimbabwe	20.67	Q
5	3	Alaba Akintola	Nigeria	20.79	q
6	2	Noah Bibi	Mauritius	20.80	Q
7	1	Sibusiso Matsenjwa	Eswatini	20.87	Q
8	3	Hachim Maaroufou	Comoros	21.07	q
9	1	Raphael Ngaguele Mberlina	Cameroon	21.08	
10	2	Tumo Stagato van Wyk	Botswana	21.10	
11	2	Godiraone Lobatlamang	Botswana	21.12	
12	1	Elvis Gaseb	Namibia	21.21	
13	2	Samuel Waweru	Kenya	21.22	
14	2	Adama Jammeh	Gambia	21.23	
15	1	Sengan Jobe	Gambia	21.37	
16	3	Ngoni Makusha	Zimbabwe	21.45	
17	2	Jacky Yapo Uleich Adzeu	Ivory Coast	21.46	
18	3	Patrice Esele Sasa	Democratic Republic of the Congo	21.47	
19	2	Dominique Lasconi Mulamba	Democratic Republic of the Congo	21.64	
20	1	Sharry Dodin	Seychelles	22.01	
	1	Sinesipho Dambile	South Africa	DNS	
	1	Fode Sissoko	Mali	DNS	
	3	Hatago Murere	Namibia	DNS	
	3	Claude Itoungue Bongogne	Cameroon	DNS	

=== Final ===
Held on 26 June

Wind: +0.1 m/s

Rank	Lane	Athlete	Nationality	Time	Notes
1st place, gold medalist(s)	6	Joseph Fahnbulleh	Liberia	20.25	
2nd place, silver medalist(s)	3	Tapiwanashe Makarawu	Zimbabwe	20.51	
3rd place, bronze medalist(s)	5	Emmanuel Eseme	Cameroon	20.66	
4	4	Abdul-Rasheed Saminu	Ghana	20.67	
5	8	Sibusiso Matsenjwa	Eswatini	20.95	
6	2	Hachim Maaroufou	Comoros	21.02	
7	7	Noah Bibi	Mauritius	21.16	
8	1	Alaba Akintola	Nigeria	21.45	

== See also ==
- Athletics at the 2023 African Games – Men's 200 metres
