= Angola at the World Athletics Championships =

- WA code: ANG
- National federation: Angolan Athletics Federation
- Website: aaf.al
- Medals: Gold 0 Silver 0 Bronze 0 Total 0

World Athletics Championships appearances (overview)
- 1983; 1987; 1991; 1993; 1995; 1997; 1999; 2001; 2003; 2005; 2007; 2009; 2011; 2013; 2015; 2017; 2019; 2022; 2023; 2025

Angola has competed at the World Athletics Championships on fourteen occasions, and did not send a delegation for the 2009 and 2017 editions. Its competing country code is ANG. The country has not won any medals at the competition and as of 2017 no Angolan athlete has reached the top eight of an event. Its best performance is by João N'Tyamba, who placed thirteenth in the 1999 men's 10,000 metres final.

== Results ==
Key

- Q = Qualified for the next round
- q = Qualified for the next round as a fastest loser or, in field events, by position without achieving the qualifying target
- NR = National record
- PB = Personal best
- SB = Season best
- N/A = Round not applicable for the event

=== 1983 ===
Angola competed at the 1983 World Championships in Athletics in Helsinki, Finland, from August 7 to 14, 1983.

==== Men ====
Track and road events

Athlete	Event	Heat		Quarterfinal		Semifinal		Final	
Athlete	Event	Result	Rank	Result	Rank	Result	Rank	Result	Rank
Rubén Inácio	100 metres	10.92	50	Did not advance					
Rubén Inácio	200 metres	22.33	43	Did not advance					

=== 2007 ===
Angola competed at the 2007 World Athletics Championships in Osaka, Japan, entering 2 athletes.

Athlete	Event	Heat		Semifinal		Final		Final Rank
Athlete	Event	Result	Rank	Result	Rank	Result	Rank	Final Rank
Nicolau Palanca	Men's 400 metres	48.60	8	Did not advance				50
Lillian Silva	Women's 800 metres	2:09.17	7	Did not advance				39

=== 2011 ===
At the 2011 World Championships in Athletics in Daegu, South Korea, a team of 2 athletes was announced to represent the country.

Athlete	Event	Preliminaries		Heats		Semifinals		Final	
Athlete	Event	Time	Rank	Time	Rank	Time	Rank	Time	Rank
Nicolau Palanca	Men's 400 metres			49.37 SB	34	Did not advance			
Alda Paulo	Women's 100 metres	12.85 Q, PB	21	13.01	55	Did not advance			

=== 2013 ===
At the 2013 World Championships in Athletics in Moscow, Russia, a 1 athlete was announced to represent the country.

Athlete	Event	Heats		Semifinals		Final	
Athlete	Event	Time	Rank	Time	Rank	Time	Rank
Manuel Antonio	Men's 800 metres	1:57.40	46	did not advance			

=== 2015 ===
Angola competed at the 2015 World Championships in Athletics in Beijing, China, from 22 to 30 August 2015.

Athlete	Event	Preliminary Round		Heat		Semifinal		Final	
Athlete	Event	Result	Rank	Result	Rank	Result	Rank	Result	Rank
Adriana Alves	Women's 100 metres	12.19	46	Did not advance					

=== 2019 ===
At the 2019 World Championships in Athletics in Doha, Qatar, Angola was represented by 1 athlete.

Athlete	Event	Heat		Semifinal		Final	
Athlete	Event	Result	Rank	Result	Rank	Result	Rank
Neide Dias	Women's 1500 metres	4:28.27	35	Did not advance			

=== 2022 ===
At the 2022 World Athletics Championships in Eugene, United States, Angola entered 1 athlete.

Athlete	Event	Heat		Semi-final		Final	
Athlete	Event	Result	Rank	Result	Rank	Result	Rank
Marcos Santos	Men's 200 m	DQ		did not advance			

=== 2023 ===
Angola competed at the 2023 World Athletics Championships in Budapest, Hungary, entering 1 athlete.

Athlete	Event	Heat		Semifinal		Final	
Athlete	Event	Result	Rank	Result	Rank	Result	Rank
Marcos Santos	Men's 200 metres	21.05 NR	7	Did not advance			

=== 2025 ===
Angola competed at the 2025 World Athletics Championships in Tokyo, Japan, from 13 to 21 September 2025, entering 1 male athlete at the tournament..

==== Men ====
Track and road events

Athlete	Event	Preliminary		Heat		Semifinal		Final	
Athlete	Event	Result	Rank	Result	Rank	Result	Rank	Result	Rank
Marcos Santos	100 metres	11.72	8	Did not advance					
