= 2024 African Championships in Athletics – Men's 4 × 100 metres relay =

Men's 4 × 100 metres relay at the 2024 African Championships in Athletics
- Venue: Japoma Stadium
- Location: Douala, Cameroon
- Dates: 23 June (heats); 24 June (final)
- Nations: 14
- Winning time: 38.63

Medalists
gold medal	Fuseini Ibrahim; Isaac Botsio; Edwin Gadayi; Abdul-Rasheed Saminu	Ghana
silver medal	Kanyinsola Ajayi; Usheoritse Itsekiri; Alaba Akintola; Godson Oghenebrume; Alexander Chukwukelu*; Emmanuel Ifeanyi Ojeli*	Nigeria
bronze medal	Gnamien Nehemie N'Goran; Ismael Koné; Arthur Gue Cissé; Kouadio Éric Kouame; Jacky Yapo Uleich Adzeu*	Ivory Coast

The men's 4 × 100 metres relay event at the 2024 African Championships in Athletics was held on 23 and 24 June in Douala, Cameroon.

== Results ==
=== Heats ===
Qualification: First 2 teams of each heat (Q) plus the next 2 fastest (q) qualified for the final.

Rank	Heat	Nation	Athletes	Time	Notes
1	1	Ivory Coast	Gnamien Nehemie N'Goran, Ismael Koné, Jacky Yapo Uleich Adzeu, Kouadio Éric Kouame	39.53	Q
2	1	Senegal	Boubacar Drame, Mamadou Fall Sarr, Omar Ndoye, Moulaye Sonko	39.61	Q
3	1	Liberia	Akeem Sirleaf, Emmanuel Matadi, Jabez Reeves, John Sherman	40.00	
1	2	Botswana	Thapelo Monaiwa, Mothusi Boitshwarelo, Tumo Stagato van Wyk, Letsile Tebogo	38.7	Q
2	2	South Africa	Bayanda Walaza, Sinesipho Dambile, Bradley Nkoana, Benjamin Richardson	39.0	Q
3	2	Kenya	Meshack Babu, Mike Nyang'au, Mark Odhiambo, Samuel Waweru	39.4	q
4	2	Namibia	Hatago Murere, Elvis Gaseb, Onesmus Nekundi, Gilbert Hainuca	39.7	q
5	2	Cameroon	Ibrahima Hamayadji, Raphael Ngaguele Mberlina, Emmanuel Eseme, Appolinaire Yimra	40.4	
1	3	Ghana	Fuseini Ibrahim, Isaac Botsio, Edwin Gadayi, Abdul-Rasheed Saminu	39.15	Q
2	3	Nigeria	Alexander Chukwukelu, Emmanuel Ifeanyi Ojeli, Alaba Akintola, Usheoritse Itsekiri	39.52	Q
3	3	Gambia	Sengan Jobe, Alieu Joof, Ebrahima Camara, Adama Jammeh	39.79	
4	3	Eswatini	Mcebo Mkhaliphi, Mlandvo Maziya, Sibusiso Matsenjwa, Thandaza Zwane	39.82	
5	3	Benin	Rémi Adandjo, Jerome Kounou, Jules Waiga, Didier Kiki	42.41	
	3	Zimbabwe	Dickson Kamungeremu, Gerren Muwishi, Tapiwa Makarawu, Ngoni Makusha	DNF	

=== Final ===
Rank	Lane	Nation	Competitors	Time	Notes
1st place, gold medalist(s)	5	Ghana	Fuseini Ibrahim, Isaac Botsio, Edwin Gadayi, Abdul-Rasheed Saminu	38.63	
2nd place, silver medalist(s)	7	Nigeria	Kanyinsola Ajayi, Usheoritse Itsekiri, Alaba Akintola, Godson Oghenebrume	38.84	
3rd place, bronze medalist(s)	3	Ivory Coast	Gnamien Nehemie N'Goran, Ismael Koné, Arthur Gue Cissé, Kouadio Éric Kouame	39.77	
4	2	Namibia	Hatago Murere, Elvis Gaseb, Onesmus Nekundi, Gilbert Hainuca	39.82	
5	1	Kenya	Meshack Babu, Mike Nyang'au, Mark Odhiambo, Samuel Waweru	40.11	
	4	South Africa	Bayanda Walaza, Sinesipho Dambile, Bradley Nkoana, Benjamin Richardson	DNF	
	6	Botswana	Thapelo Monaiwa, Mothusi Boitshwarelo, Stephen Abosi, Tumo Stagato van Wyk	DNF	
	8	Senegal	Lamine Diallo, Mamadou Fall Sarr, Omar Ndoye, Moulaye Sonko	DNF	

== See also ==
- Athletics at the 2023 African Games – Men's 4 × 100 metres relay
