= 2026 African Championships in Athletics – Men's 100 metres =

Men's 100 metres at the 2026 African Championships in Athletics
- Venue: Legon Sports Stadium
- Location: Accra, Ghana
- Dates: 12–13 May
- Competitors: 57 from 30 nations
- Winning time: 10.26

Medalists
gold medal	Emmanuel Eseme	Cameroon
silver medal	Bradley Nkoana	South Africa
bronze medal	Chidera Ezeakor	Nigeria

The men's 100 metres event at the 2026 African Championships in Athletics was held on 12 and 13 May in Accra, Ghana.

== Results ==
=== Heats ===
Held on 12 May. First 2 of each heat (Q) and the next 8 fastest (q) qualified for the semifinals.
Wind: NWI

Rank	Heat	Athlete	Nationality	Time	Notes
1	5	Emmanuel Eseme	Cameroon	10.28	Q
2	5	Joseph Paul Amoah	Ghana	10.33	Q
3	6	Tapiwanashe Makarawu	Zimbabwe	10.36	Q
4	7	Chidera Ezeakor	Nigeria	10.37	Q
5	6	Bradley Nkoana	South Africa	10.42	Q
6	5	Jayson Mandoze	Botswana	10.43	q
6	7	Abdul-Rasheed Saminu	Ghana	10.43	Q
8	5	Arão Adão Simão	Angola	10.45	q
9	5	Ronald Kiprono Koech	Kenya	10.48	q
10	3	Methembe Tshuma	Zimbabwe	10.49	Q
11	5	Sitali Kakene	Zambia	10.53	q
11	8	Yassine Hssine	Morocco	10.53	Q
13	1	Mojela Koneshe	Lesotho	10.55	Q
13	9	Favour Ashe	Nigeria	10.55	q (Note: Ashe was initially disqualified from Heat 2 after a false start but after an appeal he as allowed a solo race to qualify by time.)
15	2	Mihlali Xhotyeni	South Africa	10.60	Q
15	8	Ismaël Koné	Ivory Coast	10.60	Q
17	6	Noa Bibi	Mauritius	10.61	q
18	1	Prince Phaezel Selepe	Botswana	10.62	Q
19	4	Moses Onyango Wasike	Kenya	10.63	Q
20	3	Edwin Kwabla Gadayi	Ghana	10.66	Q
20	5	Mamadou Fall Sarr	Senegal	10.66	q
22	4	Kevin Lobatlamang	Botswana	10.69	Q
23	3	Justice Chivwamba	Zambia	10.70	q
24	1	Ngoni Makusha	Zimbabwe	10.70	
24	4	Jesus Orphee Topize	Mauritius	10.70	
26	1	Raphael Ngaguele Mberlina	Cameroon	10.73	
27	2	Kossi Médard Nayo	Togo	10.75	Q
27	7	Atse Eudes Koffi	Ivory Coast	10.75	
29	8	Charles Matundu	Namibia	10.79	
30	6	Chibueze Osama	Nigeria	10.80	
31	4	Ansu Badjie	Gambia	10.82	
32	1	Donatien Manga	Senegal	10.85	
32	3	Ibrahim Diomande	Ivory Coast	10.85	
32	4	George Eid	Cape Verde	10.85	
35	3	Mark Otieno Odhiambo	Kenya	10.86	
35	5	Joshan Vencatasamy	Mauritius	10.86	
37	2	Naseb Magano	Namibia	10.88	
37	7	Elton Hoeseb	Namibia	10.88	
39	7	Marcos Santos	Angola	10.89	
39	8	William Aguessy	Benin	10.89	
41	4	Wissy Frank Hoye Yenda Moukoula	Gabon	10.90	
42	3	Omar Ndoye	Senegal	10.91	
43	7	Revival Mwiinga Mweemba	Zambia	10.95	
44	3	Mulumba Mardoche Kanyinda	Democratic Republic of the Congo	11.00	
45	8	Caleb Adonai	Central African Republic	11.19	
46	2	Ibrahima Hamayadji	Cameroon	11.23	
47	8	Fernando Satetula	Angola	11.32	
48	6	Olivier Mwimba	Democratic Republic of the Congo	11.33	
49	1	Theodore Izerimana	Burundi	11.37	
50	3	Banza Musonge	Democratic Republic of the Congo	11.49	
51	7	Prince Nadoussou	Central African Republic	11.51	
52	6	Beckham da Costa	Guinea-Bissau	11.57	
53	8	Stern Liffa	Malawi	11.67	
54	2	Filipe Eduley	São Tomé and Príncipe	11.77	
55	4	Gregorio Ndong	Equatorial Guinea	11.91	
	1	Emmanuel Aboda	Uganda	DQ	FS
	6	Ludovic Kilambaye	Chad	DQ	FS
	8	Betuel Dikabou	Republic of the Congo	DQ	FS
	1	Malek Thiep Deng	South Sudan	DNS	
	2	Toumandji Hervé	Central African Republic	DNS	
	2	Alexis Jerrold	Seychelles	DNS	
	4	Bia Biniyam	Ethiopia	DNS	
	6	Ali Khamis Gulam	Tanzania	DNS	
	7	Farel Ouedraogo	Burkina Faso	DNS	

=== Semifinals ===
Held 12 May. First 2 of each semifinal (Q) and the next 2 fastest (q) qualified for the final.
Wind:
Heat 1: -3.5 m/s, Heat 2: -3.2 m/s, Heat 3: -3.5 m/s

Rank	Heat	Athlete	Nationality	Time	Notes
1	3	Joseph Paul Amoah	Ghana	10.38	Q
2	3	Chidera Ezeakor	Nigeria	10.41	Q
3	1	Emmanuel Eseme	Cameroon	10.42	Q
4	2	Abdul-Rasheed Saminu	Ghana	10.44	Q
5	1	Ismaël Koné	Ivory Coast	10.46	Q
6	2	Tapiwanashe Makarawu	Zimbabwe	10.47	Q
7	1	Arão Adão Simão	Angola	10.50	q
7	3	Bradley Nkoana	South Africa	10.50	q
9	2	Yassine Hssine	Morocco	10.52	
10	1	Prince Phaezel Selepe	Botswana	10.60	
11	1	Mihlali Xhotyeni	South Africa	10.63	
12	2	Favour Ashe	Nigeria	10.65	
13	2	Jayson Mandoze	Botswana	10.67	
14	1	Ronald Kiprono Koech	Kenya	10.68	
14	3	Methembe Tshuma	Zimbabwe	10.68	
16	1	Justice Chivwamba	Zambia	10.69	
16	3	Mamadou Fall Sarr	Senegal	10.69	
16	3	Kevin Lobatlamang	Botswana	10.69	
19	2	Moses Onyango Wasike	Kenya	10.70	
20	3	Kossi Médard Nayo	Togo	10.74	
21	3	Noa Bibi	Mauritius	10.78	
22	1	Mojela Koneshe	Lesotho	10.80	
23	2	Sitali Kakene	Zambia	10.81	
24	2	Edwin Kwabla Gadayi	Ghana	10.84	

=== Final ===
Held on 13 May.
Wind: -2.6 m/s

Rank	Heat	Athlete	Nationality	Time	Notes
1st place, gold medalist(s)	7	Emmanuel Eseme	Cameroon	10.26	
2nd place, silver medalist(s)	1	Bradley Nkoana	South Africa	10.32	
3rd place, bronze medalist(s)	6	Chidera Ezeakor	Nigeria	10.32	
4	5	Joseph Paul Amoah	Ghana	10.33	
5	4	Tapiwanashe Makarawu	Zimbabwe	10.33	
6	3	Abdul-Rasheed Saminu	Ghana	10.36	
7	2	Ismaël Koné	Ivory Coast	10.38	
8	8	Arão Adão Simão	Angola	10.56	
