= 2026 World Athletics Relays – Men's 4 × 100 metres relay =

Men's 4 × 100 metres relay at the 2026 World Athletics Relays
- Venue: Botswana National Stadium, Gaborone
- Dates: 2 May (heats); 3 May (repechage round & final)
- Winning time: 37.43 WL

Medalists
gold medal	Ronnie Baker; Max Thomas; Lance Lang; Pjai Austin	United States
silver medal	Myuyo Moss; Cheswill Johnson; Bradley Nkoana; Akani Simbine	South Africa
bronze medal	Kevin Kranz; Marvin Schulte; Owen Ansah; Lucas Ansah-Peprah	Germany

The men's 4 × 100 metres relay at the 2026 World Athletics Relays was held at the Botswana National Stadium in Gaborone, Botswana on 2 and 3 May 2026.

The event will serve as a qualifying event for the 2027 World Athletics Championships in Beijing. In this context, the top 12 teams in each event will qualify for the World Championships.

== Records ==
Prior to the competition, the records were as follows:

Record	Team	Time	Location	Date
World record	Jamaica (Nesta Carter, Michael Frater, Yohan Blake, Usain Bolt)	36.84	London, United Kingdom	11 August 2012
Championships record	United States (Mike Rodgers, Justin Gatlin, Tyson Gay, Ryan Bailey)	37.38	(The Bahamas) Nassau, Bahamas	2 May 2015
2026 World Leading	Gainesville Elite B (Jordan Anthony, Trayvon Bromell, Jake Odey-Jordan, Noah Lyles)	37.78	Gainesville, United States	18 April 2026

== Qualification ==
The top 8 teams in each event at the 2025 World Athletics Championships automatically qualify for entry to the championships. The remaining teams (up to 24 in total per event ) will be determined through the top lists in the qualification period from 1 January 2025 to 5 April 2026. Host country Botswana can enter with one team in each event, regardless of any entry conditions.

== Program ==
All times are local (UTC+2).

Date	Time	Round
2 May 2026	15:30	Heats
3 May 2026	15:47	Repechage round
3 May 2026	16:32	Final

== Results ==
=== Heats (World Championships Qualifying Round 1) ===
The heats were held on 2 May 2026, starting at 15:30 in the afternoon. Qualification: the first 2 of each heat (WQ) plus 2 fastest times (Wq) qualify to World Athletics Championships and World Athletics Relays Final.

==== Heat 1 ====
Rank	Lane	Nation	Competitors	Time	Notes
1	7	United States	Ronnie Baker, Max Thomas, Lance Lang, Pjai Austin	37.77	WQ, WL
2	6	Botswana	Jayson Game Mandoze, Prince Phaezel Selepe, Godiraone Lobatlamang, Letsile Tebogo	37.96	WQ, NR
3	8	Netherlands	Nsikak Ekpo, Taymir Burnet, Xavi Mo-Ajok, Elvis Afrifa	38.00	Wq, SB
4	5	Japan	Hiroki Yanagita, Shōta Iizuka, Yoshihide Kiryū, Yuhi Mori	38.01	SB
5	4	Italy	Samuele Ceccarelli, Filippo Randazzo, Fausto Desalu, Chituru Ali	38.74	SB
6	3	France	Mohammed Badru, Ylann Bizasene, Théo Schaub, Aymeric Priam	38.97	SB
7	2	Colombia	Neiker Abello, Enoc Moreno, Pedro Agualimpia, Carlos Palacios	40.86	SB

==== Heat 2 ====
Rank	Lane	Nation	Competitors	Time	Notes
1	5	Canada	Aaron Brown, Jerome Blake, Brendon Rodney, Andre De Grasse	37.56	WQ, WL
2	6	Germany	Kevin Kranz, Marvin Schulte, Owen Ansah, Lucas Ansah-Peprah	37.67	WQ, NR
3	8	Australia	Lachlan Kennedy, Joshua Azzopardi, Christopher Ius, Rohan Browning	37.87	Wq, =AR
4	7	Jamaica	Rohan Watson, Odaine McPherson, Adrian Kerr, Rasheed Foster	38.08	SB
5	2	Kenya	Mark Odhiambo, Ronald Koech, Meshack Babu, Ferdinand Omanyala	38.50	SB
6	4	Spain	Alberto Calero, Juan Carlos Castillo, Jaime Sancho, Jorge Hernandez	38.80	SB
	3	Belgium	Kobe Vleminckx, Emiel Botterman, Antoine Snyders, Cédric Verschueren	DNF	

==== Heat 3 ====
Rank	Lane	Nation	Competitors	Time	Notes
1	5	South Africa	Myuyo Moss, Cheswill Johnson, Bradley Nkoana, Akani Simbine	37.68	WQ, SB
2	8	Great Britain	Jeremiah Azu, Zharnel Hughes, Nethaneel Mitchell-Blake, Romell Glave	38.01	WQ, SB
3	4	China	Shi Junhao, Zeng Keli, Wang Shengjie, He Jinxian	38.02	SB
4	7	Ghana	Abdul-Rasheed Saminu, Benjamin Azamati, Joseph Amoah, Edwin Gadayi	38.19	SB
5	6	Nigeria	Favour Ashe, James Taiwo Emmanuel, Tejiri Godwin, Chidera Ezeakor	38.31	SB
6	3	Brazil	Gabriel Aparecido dos Santos, Felipe Bardi, Erik Cardoso, Jorge Vides	38.61	SB
7	2	Poland	Patryk Krupa, Mateusz Siuda, Łukasz Żok, Dominik Kopeć	38.91	SB
8	1	India	Harsh Santosh Raut, Ragul Kumar, Animesh Kujur, Gurindervir Singh	39.07	SB

=== Repechage Round (World Championships Qualifying Round 2) ===
The repechage round was held on 3 May 2026, starting at 15:47 in the afternoon. Qualification: the first 2 of each heat (WQ) qualify to World Athletics Championships.

==== Heat 1 ====
Rank	Lane	Nation	Competitors	Time	Notes
1	8	China	Shi Junhao, Zeng Keli, Wang Shengjie, He Jinxian	37.85	WQ, SB
2	7	Ghana	Edwin Gadayi, Benjamin Azamati, Joseph Amoah, Abdul-Rasheed Saminu	38.09	WQ, SB
3	5	Kenya	Mark Odhiambo, Ronald Koech, Meshack Babu, Ferdinand Omanyala	38.27	NR
4	6	Italy	Eduardo Longobardi, Filippo Randazzo, Fausto Desalu, Chituru Ali	38.47	SB
5	4	Colombia	Deiner Guaitoto, Carlos Palacios, Pedro Agualimpia, Neiker Abello	39.16	SB
	3	Brazil	Gabriel Aparecido dos Santos, Felipe Bardi, Erik Cardoso, Paulo André Camilo	DNF	
	2	Spain	Andoni Calbano, Guillem Crespí, Jaime Sancho, Jorge Hernández	DQ	TR24.7

==== Heat 2 ====
Rank	Lane	Nation	Competitors	Time	Notes
1	4	Jamaica	Rohan Watson, Odaine McPherson, Adrian Kerr, Rasheed Foster	38.14	WQ, SB
2	8	Belgium	Robin Vanderbemden, Emiel Botterman, Antoine Snyders, Kobe Vleminckx	38.40	WQ, NR
3	5	Nigeria	Favour Ashe, James Taiwo Emmanuel, Tejiri Godwin, Chidera Ezeakor	38.50	
4	6	France	Lenny Chanteur, Ylann Bizasene, Théo Schaub, Aymeric Priam	38.83	SB
5	7	Japan	Yuhi Mori, Shōta Iizuka, Yoshihide Kiryū, Naoki Inoue	51.57	
	2	India	Harsh Santosh Raut, Animesh Kujur, Ragul Kumar, Gurindervir Singh	DQ	TR24.7
	3	Poland	Jakub Lempach, Mateusz Siuda, Patryk Krupa, Dominik Kopeć	DQ	TR24.7

=== Final ===
The final was held on 3 May 2026, starting at 16:32 in the afternoon.

Rank	Lane	Nation	Competitors	Time	Notes
1st place, gold medalist(s)	6	United States	Ronnie Baker, Max Thomas, Lance Lang, Pjai Austin	37.43	WL
2nd place, silver medalist(s)	7	South Africa	Myuyo Moss, Cheswill Johnson, Bradley Nkoana, Akani Simbine	37.49	AR
3rd place, bronze medalist(s)	5	Germany	Kevin Kranz, Marvin Schulte, Owen Ansah, Lucas Ansah-Peprah	37.76	
4	1	Australia	Lachlan Kennedy, Joshua Azzopardi, Christopher Ius, Rohan Browning	38.00	
5	2	Netherlands	Jaimie Omalla, Taymir Burnet, Onyema Adigida, Elvis Afrifa	38.17	
6	8	Botswana	Jayson Game Mandoze, Prince Phaezel Selepe, Godiraone Lobatlamang, Calvin Bogosi Omphile	38.35	
7	4	Canada	Aaron Brown, Jerome Blake, Brendon Rodney, Andre De Grasse	40.06	
	3	Great Britain	Jeremiah Azu, Zharnel Hughes, Nethaneel Mitchell-Blake, Romell Glave	DNF	
