= Max Thomas (sprinter) =

American athlete (born 2004)

Personal information
- Born: February 24, 2004 (age 22)

Sport
- Sport: Athletics
- Event: Sprint

Achievements and titles
- Personal bests: 60m: 6.53 (2025); 100 m: 9.90 (2026); 200m: 19.98 (2026)
Medal record
Men's athletics
Representing United States
World Relays
Gold medal – first place	2026 Gaborone	4×100 m relay

Maximilian Thomas (born February 24, 2004) is an American sprinter. He was runner-up over 100 metres at the 2025 NCAA Championships and third over 200 metres at the 2026 USA Championships.

== Early life ==
From Long Beach, California, he attended Servite High School where his father, Brandon Thomas, was coach of the track team. He played soccer when he was younger, featuring for Slammers FC in Huntington Beach. He was the Orange County boys track and field athlete of the year in 2021. He later attended the University of Southern California.

== Career ==
Thomas was a semi-finalist over 200 metres at the 2024 US Olympic Trials in Eugene, Oregon.

Thomas finished runner-up over 100 metres to Jordan Anthony and placed sixth in the final of the 200 metres, at the 2025 NCAA Outdoor Championships in Eugene, Oregon, helping his University of Southern California team to a share of the overall men's title. Later that month, he announced he would be foregoing his collegiate eligibility to turn professional.

Thomas reached the semi-finals of the 100 metres at the 2025 USA Outdoor Track and Field Championships finishing fourth in his heat behind Courtney Lindsey, Christian Coleman and Brandon Hicklin in 10.20 seconds into a slight headwind (-1.0 m/s). At the same championships, he reached the final of the 200 metres, placing ninth overall.

Thomas placed fourth in the final of the 60 metres at the 2026 USA Indoor Track and Field Championships in New York, running 6.55 seconds.

At the Florida Relays in April 2026 Thomas ran a personal best 9.90 seconds (+1.2) for the 100 metres. Later that month at the Tom Jones Invitational in Gainesville, Florida Thomas ran the 200 m in a personal best 19.98 seconds, finishing behind Noah Lyles. He was named in the United States team for the 2026 World Athletics Relays in Gaborone, Botswana. He ran in the men's 4 × 100 m alongside Ronnie Baker, Lance Lang and Pjai Austin as the team won the opening heat with a time of 37.77 seconds. The following day, the quartet won the final in a time of 37.43 seconds ahead of defending champions South Africa who set a new African record.

On 24 July, he was a finalist at the 2026 USA Outdoor Track and Field Championships over 100 metres. The following day, he returned to the championships and placed third in the 200 metres final, with Thomas and second-placed Brandon Hicklin both finishing in 20.29 seconds, behind Garrett Kaalund.
