= Cheswill Johnson =

South African athlete (born 1997)

Personal information
- Nationality: South African
- Born: Cheswill Johnson; 30 September 1997 (age 29)
- Height: 1.80 m (5 ft 11 in)

Sport
- Sport: Track and Field
- Event: Long jump
- Coached by: Reneilwe Aphane

Achievements and titles
- Personal bests: 100 meters: 10.02 (2026); 200 meters: 20.26 (2026); Long Jump: 8.26 (2021)
Medal record
Men's athletics
Representing South Africa
World Relays
Silver medal – second place	2026 Gaborone	4×100 m relay
African Championships
Gold medal – first place	2024 Douala	Long jump
Silver medal – second place	2022 Mauritius	4×100 m
Silver medal – second place	2022 Mauritius	Long jump

Cheswill Johnson (born 30 September 1997) is a South African athlete who predominantly competes in the long jump. He was African champion in 2024 and has represented South Africa at multiple global championships, including the 2020 and 2024 Olympic Games.

== Early life ==
He studied logistics/supply chain at the University of Johannesburg.

== Career ==
Johnson jumped 8.20 in Johannesburg on 1 February 2020, which was the 9th longest senior outdoor long jump in the world in 2020.

Johnson qualified for the delayed 2020 Tokyo Olympic Games when he leapt to 8.26m at the Athletics Gauteng North Bestmed Tuks Track and Field meeting in Pretoria on February 27, 2021. When he made the jump it was the leading jump in the world that year. Johnson joins fellow long-jumpers, African champion Ruswahl Samaai and Zarck Visser, in the South Africa Olympic squad, where he failed to register a jump in the qualifying round.

He won the long jump at the South African national championships in Pietermaritzburg in April 2024. He competed in the long jump at the 2024 Paris Olympics.

He was selected to compete in the long jump at the 2025 World Athletics Indoor Championships in Nanjing in March 2025. In April, he jumped 7.97 metres to place second at the South African Championships. In September 2025, he competed at the 2025 World Championships in Tokyo, Japan, without advancing to the final.

Johnson achieved a 100 metres personal best of 10.02 seconds at the Simbine Classic in Pretoria in April 2026. Competing on the opening day at the 2026 World Athletics Relays on 2 May, he was part of the South African men's 4 x 100 metres team which won their heat in 37.68 seconds. The following day, he ran as the team of Johnson, Mvuyo Moss, Bradley Nkoana and Akani Simbine won the silver medal and set a new South African national and African record 37.49 to move to sixth on the world all-time list.

Johnson competed in the 100 metres at the 2026 Commonwealth Games in Glasgow, Scotland, advancing to the final and placing eighth overall. He also ran in the men's 4 × 100 m relay.
