= Mvuyo Moss =

South African athlete (born 2002)

Personal information
- Nationality: South African
- Born: 12 March 2002 (age 24)

Sport
- Sport: Athletics
- Event: Sprints

Achievements and titles
- Personal bests: 100m: 10.09 (2026); 200m: 20.29 (2026)
Medal record
Men's athletics
Representing South Africa
World Relays
Silver medal – second place	2026 Gaborone	4×100 m relay

Mvuyo Moss (born 12 March 2002) is a South African sprinter. In 2026, he was part of the South Africa men's 4 × 100 metres relay team which set a new African record at the 2026 World Athletics Relays.

== Biography ==
From Auckland Park, Miss attended Vorentoe High School in Johannesburg. As an U19 athlete in 2021, Moss ran 10.54 seconds for the 100 metres and 21.01 seconds for the 200 metres.

In April 2025, he was part of the Central Guateng 4 x 100 metres relay team which won the South African Championships at McArthur Stadium in Potchefstroom, running alongside Retshidisitswe Mlenga, Cheswill Johnson and Tsebo Matsoso, running 39.10 seconds.

In March 2026, Moss ran a wind-assisted 20.26 seconds for the 200 m in Johannesburg. The following month, he ran 10.09 seconds for the 100 metres at the South African Championships in Stellenbosch. Competing for South Africa on the opening day at the 2026 World Athletics Relays on 2 May, he was part of the South African men's 4 x 100 metres team alongside Cheswill Johnson, Bradley Nkoana and Akani Simbine, as they won their heat in 37.68 seconds. The following day, he ran as the team won the silver medal and set a new South African national and African record 37.49 to move to sixth on the world all-time list. He competed in the 200 metres at the 2026 Commonwealth Games in Glasgow, Scotland. He also ran in the men's 4 × 100 m relay.
