= Isaac Botsio =

Ghanaian athlete (born 1999)

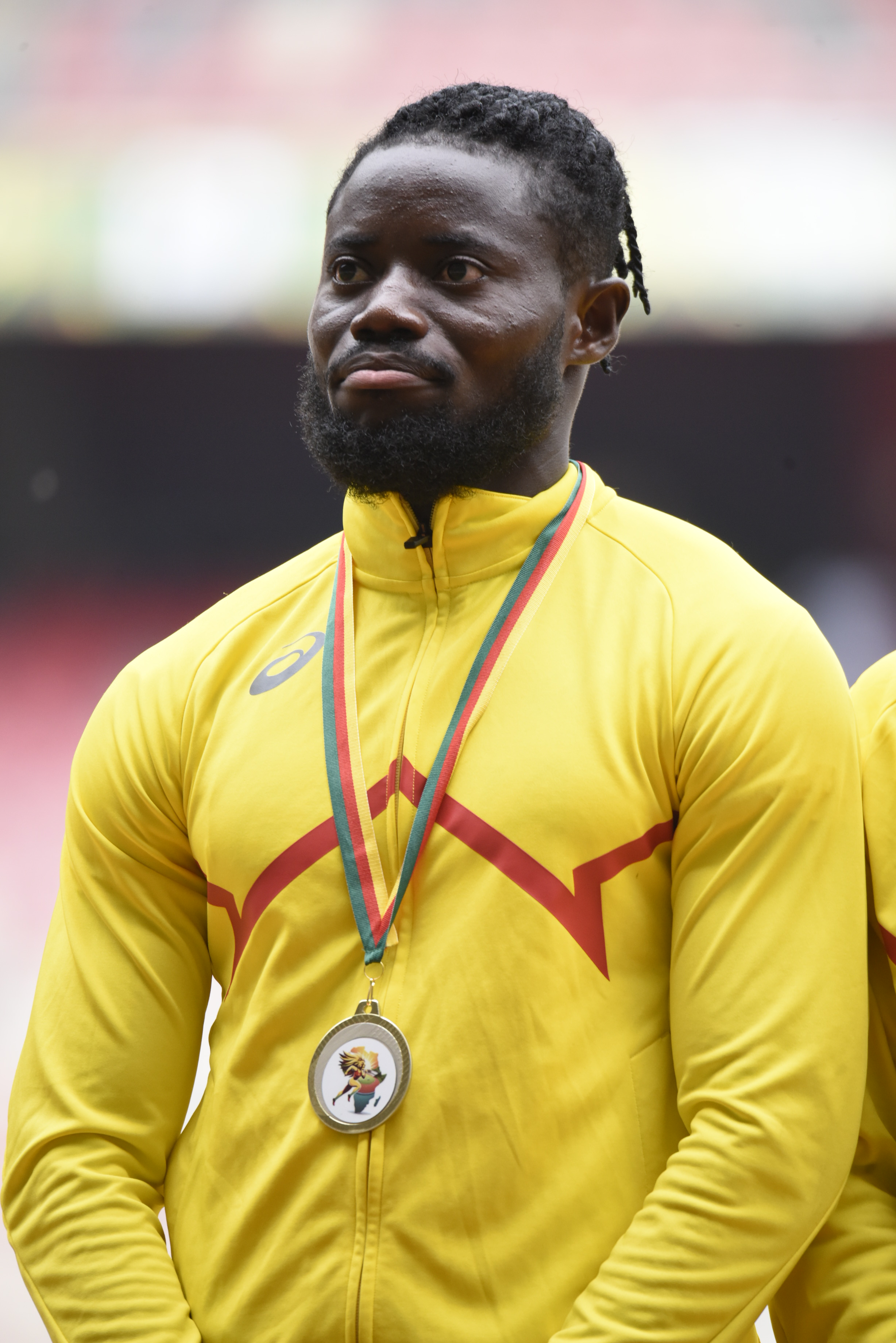
- Botsio in 2024

Personal information
- Nationality: Ghanaian
- Born: 11 December 1999 (age 26)

Sport
- Sport: Athletics
- Event: Sprint

Achievements and titles
- Personal bests: 60m: 6.62 (2023); 100m: 10.06 (2026); 200m: 20.80 (2025)
Medal record
Men's athletics
Representing Ghana
African Championships
Gold medal – first place	2024 Douala	4×100 m relay

Isaac Botsio (born 11 December 1999) is a Ghanaian sprinter. He won a gold medal in the men's 4 x 100 metres relay at the 2024 African Championships.

== Early and personal life ==
Born in Ahinkofikrom, a suburb of Sekondi-Takoradi, Ghana, Botsio was a keen footballer before discovering athletics in high school. He attended Ghana Senior High Technical School and the University of Ghana, later graduating with a nursery degree from the West Texas A&M University.

== Career ==
Competing for the University of Ghana, he won the bronze medal over 100 metres at the 2022 Federation of Africa University Sports (FASU) Games with a personal best 10.33 seconds. He was also part of the winning men's 4 × 100 m relay alongside James Dadzie, Solomon Hammond, and Abdul-Rasheed Saminu in a time of 39.38 seconds.

Having earned a scholarship to West Texas A&M University in the United States, he ran 6.62 seconds for the 60 metres at the NCAA Division II men's indoor track and field championships in 2023. Botsio placed second in 6.64 seconds for the 60 metres the following year at the 2024 NCAA DII Indoor Championships. Competing in Apr 2024 for West Texas A&M University, Botsio ran a wind-assisted 100 metres in 9.90 seconds (+2.2 m/s), moving to none second on the Ghanaian all-conditions all-time list. He subsequently won the 100 metres at the 2024 NCAA II Outdoor Championships. He competed for Ghana in the 4 x 100 metres relay at the 2024 World Athletics Relays in Nassau, Bahamas. After initially failing to get the baton round, the team successfully navigated the repechage round to qualify for the 2024 Paris Olympics. In June, competing for Ghana, he was a gold medalist in the 4 x 100 metres relay at the 2024 African Championships in Douala, Cameroon in June 2024, alongside Ibrahim Fuseini, Edwin Gadayi and Saminu. He was also a finalist in the individual 100 metres at the championships, placing seventh overall.

Botsio retained the 100 mates title at the 2025 NCAA Division II Outdoor Track & Field Championships, also winning the 4 x 100 metres relay in a team including his Ghanaian teammate Janes Dadzie.

Botsio placed fourth in 6.64 seconds for the 60 metres at the 2026 NCAA DII Indoor Championships. That year, he won the 100 metres title at the NCAA II Outdoor Championships for his seventh national title for West Texas. He competed in the 100 metres at the 2026 Commonwealth Games in Glasgow, Scotland, without advancing to the semi-finals.
