= Athletics at the 2023 African Games – Men's 200 metres =

Men's 200 metres at the 2023 African Games
- Venue: Legon Sports Stadium
- Location: Accra, Ghana
- Dates: 21 March (heats & semi-finals); 22 March (final)
- Competitors: 57 from 32 nations
- Winning time: 20.70

Medalists
gold medal	Joseph Amoah	Ghana
silver medal	Claude Itoungue Bongogne	Cameroon
bronze medal	Consider Ekanem	Nigeria

The men's 200 metres event at the 2023 African Games was held on 21 and 22 March 2024 in Accra, Ghana.

== Results ==
=== Heats ===
Held on 21 March
Qualification: First 2 in each heat (Q) and the next 6 fastest (q) advanced to the semifinals.

Wind:
Heat 1: -1.3 m/s, Heat 2: -1.1 m/s, Heat 3: -0.8 m/s, Heat 4: -1.2 m/s, Heat 5: -2.0 m/s
Heat 6: -1.1 m/s, Heat 7: -1.9 m/s, Heat 8: -2.7 m/s, Heat 9: -1.7 m/s

Rank	Heat	Name	Nationality	Time	Notes
1	4	Sibusiso Matsenjwa	Eswatini	20.80	Q
2	6	Joseph Amoah	Ghana	20.91	Q
3	4	Consider Ekanem	Nigeria	20.94	Q
4	6	Marcos Santos	Angola	20.96	Q, NR
5	5	Claude Itoungue Bongogne	Cameroon	20.97	Q
6	4	Kakene Sitali	Zambia	21.00	q
7	2	Noah Bibi	Mauritius	21.02	Q
8	7	Ibrahim Fuseini	Ghana	21.02	Q
9	7	Alaba Akintola	Nigeria	21.08	Q
10	1	Raphael Ngaguele Mberlina	Cameroon	21.13	Q
11	5	Guy Maganga Gorra	Gabon	21.13	Q
12	5	Elvis Gaseb	Namibia	21.14	q
13	1	Dominique Lasconi Mulamba	Democratic Republic of the Congo	21.14	Q
14	3	Samuel Waweru	Kenya	21.14	Q
15	9	Ngoni Makusha	Zimbabwe	21.20	Q
16	4	Adama Jammeh	The Gambia	21.28	q
17	4	Jason Mandoze	Botswana	21.29	q
18	2	Kevin Lobatlamang	Botswana	21.29	Q
19	9	Solomon Hammond	Ghana	21.32	Q
20	8	Gilbert Hainuca	Namibia	21.36	Q
21	1	Fodé Sissoko	Mali	21.40	q
22	6	Hesbon Ochieng	Kenya	21.40	q
23	3	Stern Noel Liffa	Malawi	21.45	Q
24	2	Kebba Makalo	The Gambia	21.47	
25	8	Sharry Dodin	Seychelles	21.51	Q
26	1	Frank Hoye Moukoula Wissy	Gabon	21.55	
27	3	Jerome Kounou	Benin	21.67	
28	3	Allan Ngobi	Uganda	21.67	
29	3	Patrice Esele Sasa	Democratic Republic of the Congo	21.74	
30	6	Ali Khamis Gulam	Tanzania	21.78	
31	5	Gnamien Nehemie N'goran	Ivory Coast	21.79	
32	2	Edson Deve	Mozambique	21.82	
33	9	Denzel Adem	Seychelles	21.83	
34	1	Joshan Vencatasamy	Mauritius	21.84	
35	8	Yapo Jacky Adzeu	Ivory Coast	21.87	
36	7	Roméo Manzila Mahambou	Republic of the Congo	21.88	
37	9	Lawrence Feidel	Sierra Leone	21.88	
38	4	Emmanuel Aboda	Uganda	21.94	
39	5	Amara Conte	Guinea	21.96	
40	8	Dan Kiviasi Asamba	Kenya	22.01	
41	8	Kossi Médard Nayo	Togo	22.02	
42	6	Hatago Murere	Namibia	22.03	
43	8	Benson Okot	Uganda	22.03	
44	6	Jacques Mboko Niamba	Republic of the Congo	22.18	
45	4	Gasisi Gegasa	Tanzania	22.20	
46	2	Arthur Quaqua	Liberia	22.23	
47	7	Melkamu Assefa	Ethiopia	22.24	
48	9	Yohannes Kiflemariam	Eritrea	22.36	
49	1	Adem Musa	Ethiopia	22.45	
50	9	Mintesnot Wachso	Ethiopia	22.53	
51	6	Esmael Freitas	São Tomé and Príncipe	22.57	
52	7	Derek Kargbo	Sierra Leone	22.66	
53	2	Mulumba Kanyinda	Democratic Republic of the Congo	22.85	
54	5	Abu Bakarr Sesay	Sierra Leone	22.90	
55	3	Vanderley Panzo	Equatorial Guinea	22.93	
56	4	Arão Adão Simão	Angola	22.97	
57	2	Tamba Djuma	Guinea-Bissau	23.00	
	1	Jobe Sengan	The Gambia	DNS	
	3	Gilles Anthony Afoumba	Republic of the Congo	DNS	
	3	Israel Okon Sunday	Nigeria	DNS	
	5	Justice Chivwamba	Zambia	DNS	
	6	Malambo Chongo	Zambia	DNS	
	7	Chakir Machmour	Morocco	DNS	
	7	Dickson Kamungeremu	Zimbabwe	DNS	
	8	Natnael Gebregzabher	Eritrea	DNS	
	9	Jean Mark Allokoua	Ivory Coast	DNS	

=== Semifinals ===
Held on 21 March
Qualification: First 2 in each semifinal (Q) and the next 2 fastest (q) advanced to the final.

Wind:
Heat 1: -1.7 m/s, Heat 2: -2.2 m/s, Heat 3: -0.9 m/s

Rank	Heat	Name	Nationality	Time	Notes
1	1	Claude Itoungue Bongogne	Cameroon	20.82	Q
2	1	Consider Ekanem	Nigeria	20.92	Q
3	2	Joseph Amoah	Ghana	20.93	Q
4	3	Alaba Akintola	Nigeria	21.00	Q
5	1	Adama Jammeh	The Gambia	21.02	q
6	3	Samuel Waweru	Kenya	21.02	Q
7	2	Ibrahim Fuseini	Ghana	21.03	Q
8	3	Sibusiso Matsenjwa	Eswatini	21.04	q
9	1	Gilbert Hainuca	Namibia	21.05	
10	1	Solomon Hammond	Ghana	21.06	
11	3	Guy Maganga Gorra	Gabon	21.10	
12	1	Noah Bibi	Mauritius	21.12	
13	2	Elvis Gaseb	Namibia	21.16	
14	3	Kakene Sitali	Zambia	21.18	
15	1	Jason Mandoze	Botswana	21.24	
16	2	Ngoni Makusha	Zimbabwe	21.25	
17	2	Marcos Santos	Angola	21.26	
18	2	Dominique Lasconi Mulamba	Democratic Republic of the Congo	21.29	
19	2	Fodé Sissoko	Mali	21.36	
20	1	Kevin Lobatlamang	Botswana	21.37	
21	3	Raphael Ngaguele Mberlina	Cameroon	21.52	
22	3	Hesbon Ochieng	Kenya	21.55	
23	3	Sharry Dodin	Seychelles	21.64	
24	2	Stern Noel Liffa	Malawi	21.64	

=== Final ===
Held on 22 March
Wind: -2.8 m/s

Rank	Lane	Name	Nationality	Time	Notes
1st place, gold medalist(s)	6	Joseph Amoah	Ghana	20.70	
2nd place, silver medalist(s)	5	Claude Itoungue Bongogne	Cameroon	20.74	
3rd place, bronze medalist(s)	4	Consider Ekanem	Nigeria	20.80	
4	2	Ibrahim Fuseini	Ghana	20.85	
5	1	Sibusiso Matsenjwa	Eswatini	21.12	
6	3	Alaba Akintola	Nigeria	21.12	
7	8	Adama Jammeh	The Gambia	21.14	
8	7	Samuel Waweru	Kenya	21.35	
