= Gabriel Aparecido dos Santos =

Brazilian athlete (born 1997)

Gabriel Aparecido dos Santos Garcia
Personal information
- Born: 2 October 1997 (age 28)

Sport
- Sport: Athletics
- Event: Sprint

Achievements and titles
- Personal best(s): 60m: 6.53 (2026); 100m: 10.10 (2023); 200m: 20.51 (2024)
Medal record
Representing Brazil
Men's athletics
South American Indoor Championships
Gold medal – first place	2026 Cochabamba	60 m

Gabriel Aparecido dos Santos Garcia (born 2 October 1997) is a Brazilian sprinter. He won the gold medal in the 60 metres at the 2026 South American Indoor Championships. He competed at the 2024 Olympic Games and at the 2024 Paralympic Games as a guide runner for gold medal winning compatriot Jerusa Geber dos Santos.

== Biography ==
From São Paulo, he is a member of Esporte Clube Pinheiros. In 2024, he was the Brazil champion over 200 metres. He was selected as part of the Brazilian 4 x 100 metres relay team for the 2024 Olympic Games. He also competed at the 2024 Paralympic Games as a guide runner for compatriot Jerusa Geber dos Santos, who won gold meals in the Women's 100 m and 200 m T11. In doing so, he became the first Brazilian man to compete in both the Olympic Games and Paralympic Games.

Dos Santos Garcia won the 60 metres in 6.56 seconds to finish ahead of Venezuelan Bryant Alamo at the 2026 South American Indoor Championships, in Cochabamba, Bolivia. In March 2026, he was selected for the 2026 World Athletics Indoor Championships in Toruń, Poland, running 6.63 seconds without advancing to the semi-finals. In May, he ran at the 2026 World Athletics Relays in the men's 4 × 100 metres relay in Gaborone, Botswana.
