= Claude Itoungue Bongogne =

Cameroonian sprinter (born 2001)

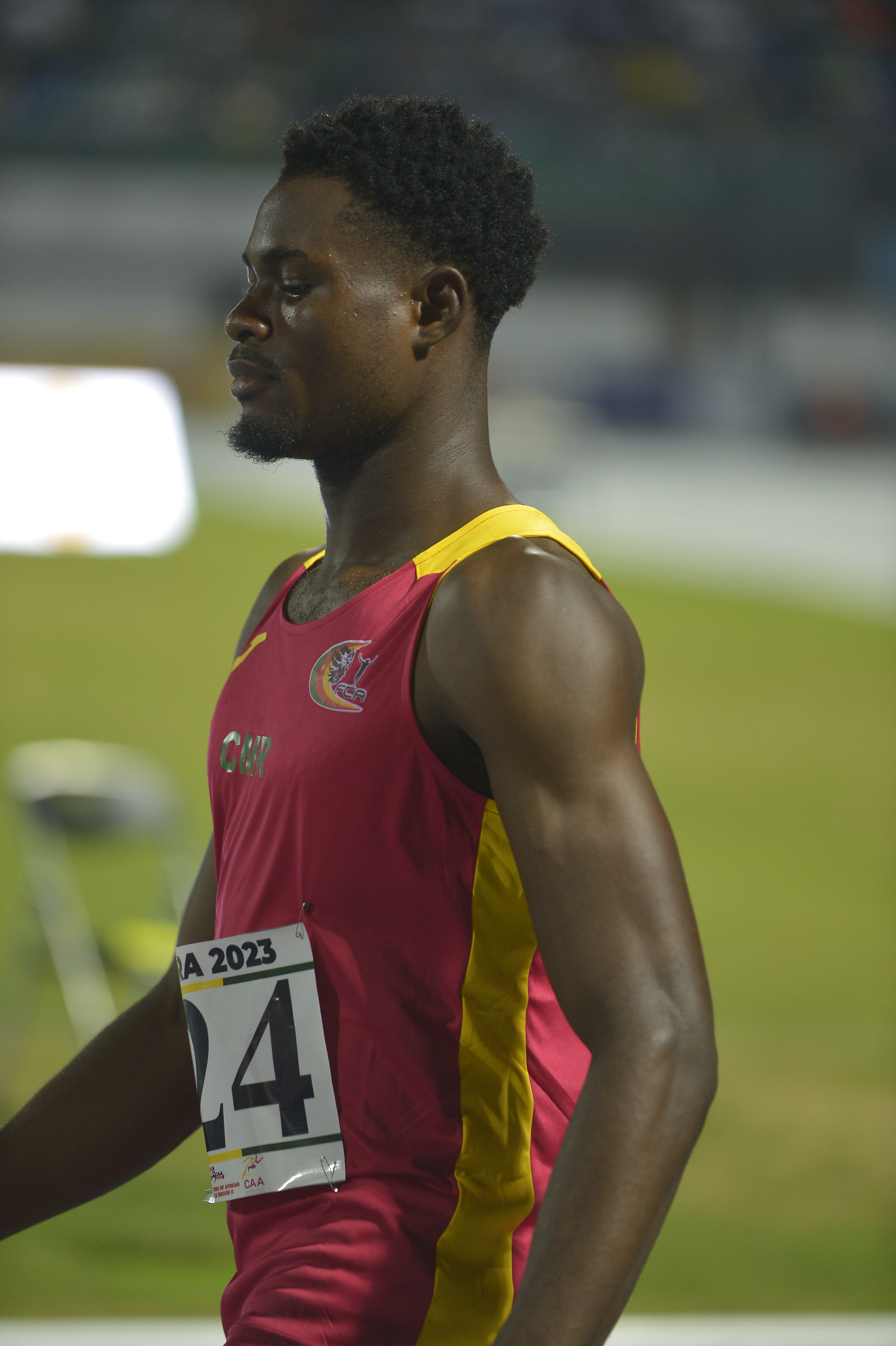
- 2023 African Games

Personal information
- Full name: Claude Emmanuel Itoungue Bongogne
- Nationality: Cameroonian
- Born: 3 August 2001 (age 25)

Sport
- Sport: Athletics
- Event: Sprinting
Medal record
Men's athletics
Representing Cameroon
African Games
Silver medal – second place	2023 Accra	200 m
Islamic Solidarity Games
Bronze medal – third place	2025 Riyadh	200 m

Claude Emmanuel Itoungue Bongogne (born 3 August 2001) is a Cameroonian sprinter. He won the silver medal in the 200 metres at the 2024 African Games in Accra, Ghana.

== Personal bests ==
Outdoor

- 100 metres – 10.13 (+0.7 m/s, Yaoundé 2024)
- 200 metres – 20.31 (+1.7 m/s, Yaoundé 2024) =NR

== International competitions ==
Year	Competition	Venue	Position	Event	Notes
Representing Cameroon
2023	Jeux de la Francophonie	Kinshasa, DR Congo	8th	100 m	10.57
2023	Jeux de la Francophonie	Kinshasa, DR Congo	6th	200 m	20.88
2023	Jeux de la Francophonie	Kinshasa, DR Congo	4th	4 × 100 m relay	39.72
2024	African Games	Accra, Ghana	11th (sf)	100 m	10.53
2024	African Games	Accra, Ghana	2nd	200 m	20.74
2024	African Games	Accra, Ghana	9th (h)	4 × 100 m relay	39.96
2024	African Championships	Douala, Cameroon	24th (h)	200 m	21.51^{1}
2025	Islamic Solidarity Games	Riyadh, Saudi Arabia	9th (sf)	100 m	10.45
2025	Islamic Solidarity Games	Riyadh, Saudi Arabia	3rd	200 m	20.84
2025	Islamic Solidarity Games	Riyadh, Saudi Arabia	6th	4 × 100 m relay	40.04
2026	World Indoor Championships	Toruń, Poland	22nd (sf)	60 m	6.66

^{1}Did not start in the semifinals
