= Chidera Ezeakor =

Nigerian sprinter (born 2005)

Personal information
- Born: 5 May 2005 (age 21)

Sport
- Sport: Athletics
- Event: Sprint

Achievements and titles
- Personal bests: 100m: 10.03 (2026); 200m: 20.72 (2025)
Medal record
Men's athletics
Representing Nigeria
African Championships
Silver medal – second place	2026 Accra	4×100 m relay
Bronze medal – third place	2026 Accra	100 m
Commonwealth Games
Bronze medal – third place	2026 Glasgow	4×100m relay
Islamic Solidarity Games
Silver medal – second place	2025 Riyadh	4x100 m relay

Chidera Ezeakor (born 5 May 2005) is a Nigerian sprinter.

== Biography ==
Representing Edo State, Ezeakor won the 100 metres at the National Sports Festival in Abeokuta in May 2025, finishing in 10.27 seconds. At the Nigerian Athletics Championships in Yabatech on 1 August 2025, he ran a new personal best of 10.25 seconds. Later that year, he became a bronze medalist in the men's 4 x 100 metres relay representing Nigeria at the 2025 Islamic Solidarity Games in Riyadh, Saudi Arabia. In July of the same year, he signed with the University of Iowa men's track and field team.

In March 2026, he won over 100 metres at the AFN Golden League in Benin City. The following month, he ran a personal best for the 100 in the senior men’s final at the MTN CHAMPS Grand Final in Ibadan to tie with Enoch Adegoke as both men ran 10.15s, sharing the title. Competing for Nigeria at the 2026 World Athletics Relays in Gaborone, Botswana, on 2 May, Ezeakor was part of the Nigerian mixed 4 x 100 metres relay team which qualified for the final, running an African record 40.24 seconds. Later that month, he competed for Nigeria at the 2026 African Championships in Accra, Ghana, winning the bronze medal in the men's 100 m final, credited with the same time as the silver medalist, South Africa’s Bradley Nkoana.

He ran a personal best for the 100 metres in June 2026, running 10.03 seconds at the Nigerian Championships and Commonwealth Games Trials, placing third in the final behind Favour Ashe and Adekalu Nicholas Fakorede. At the 2026 Commonwealth Games in Glasgow, Scotland, he ran in the heats as part of the Nigerian team which went on to win the bronze medal in the men's 4 × 100 m relay.
