= Ibrahim Fuseini =

Ghanaian athlete (born 2002)

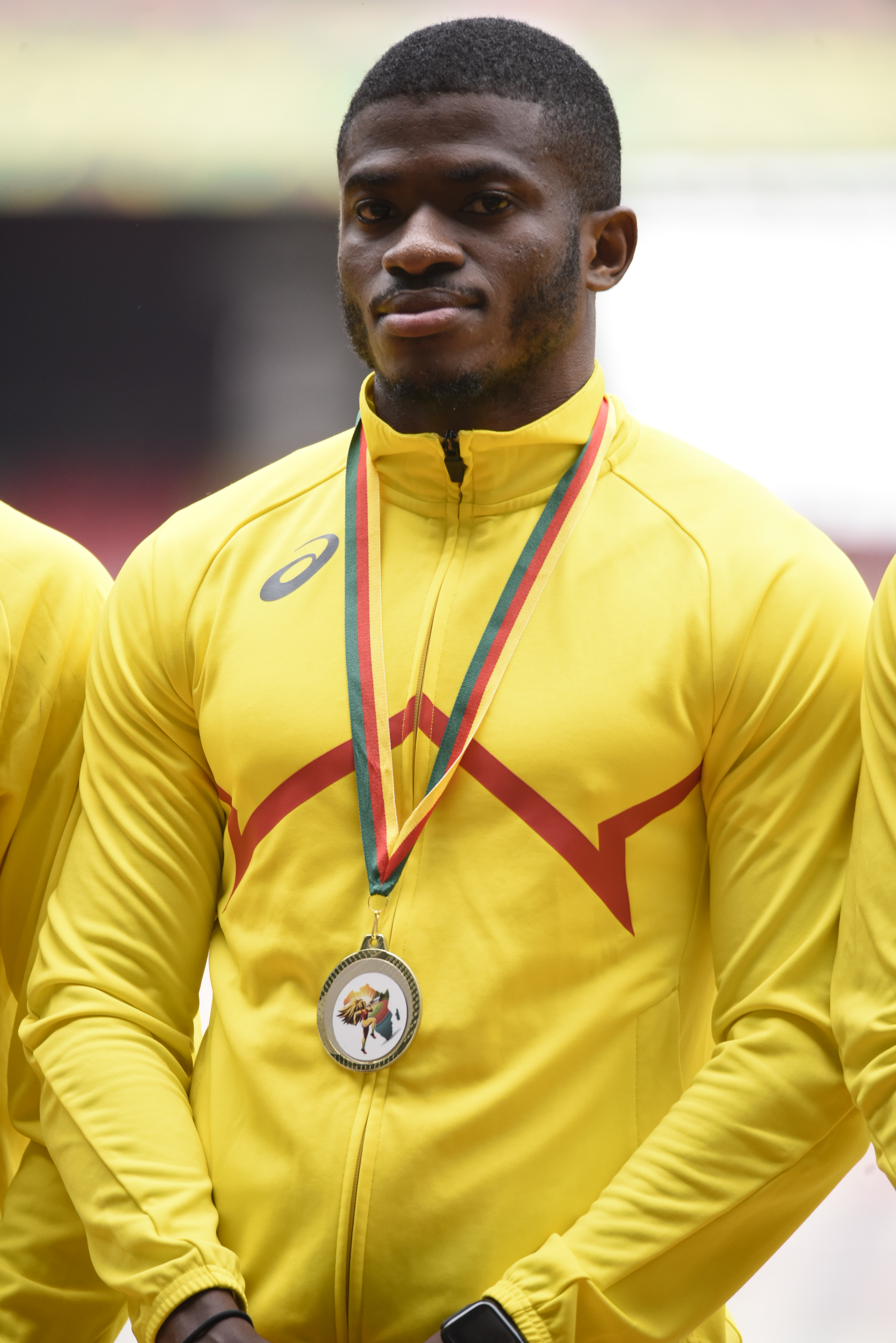

Personal information
- Born: 24 November 2002 (age 23)

Sport
- Sport: Athletics
- Event: Sprint

Achievements and titles
- Personal bests: 60m: 6.51 (Lubbock, 2025); 100m: 10.15 (San Antonio, 2024); 200m: 20.32 (San Antonio, 2024)
Medal record
Representing Ghana
Men's athletics
African Championships
Gold medal – first place	2024 Douala	4×100 m relay
Bronze medal – third place	2026 Accra	4×100 m relay

Ibrahim Fuseini (born 24 November 2002) is a Ghanaian sprinter.

== Career ==
He qualified for the final of the 200 metres at the 2023 African Games, placing fourth overall.

He competed for Ghana in the 4 x 100 metres relay at the 2024 World Athletics Relays in Nassau, Bahamas. After initially failing to get the baton round they successfully navigated the recharge round to qualify for the Paris Olympics. He was a gold medalist in the 4 x 100 metres relay at the 2024 African Championships in Douala, Cameroon in June 2024, alongside Isaac Botsio, Edwin Gadayi and Abdul-Rasheed Saminu.

He was a member of the Ghanaian 4 x 100 metres relay team which competed at the 2024 Summer Olympics in Paris. Alongside Saminu, Benjamin Azamati, and Joseph Paul Amoah he helped record a time of 38.62 seconds in Heat 2. However, they later suffered a disqualification due to an infringement during the baton exchange.

In February 2025, he ran a personal best 6.51 seconds for the 60 metres whilst competing in the United States. He was selected for the 60 metres at the 2025 World Athletics Indoor Championships in Nanjing. He competed at the 2025 World Athletics Relays in China in the Men's 4 × 100 metres relay in May 2025. On the second day of the competition he helped Ghana secure a qualifying place for the upcoming World Championships.

In September 2025, he competed in the 200 metres at the 2025 World Championships in Tokyo, Japan. He also ran in the men's 4 x 100 metres relay at the championships as the Ghana team placed fourth.

== Personal life ==
He attended East Texas A&M University, the St Augustine's College, Kwame Nkrumah University of Science and Technology in Ghana.

== Career statistics ==
Figures from World Athletics profile.

=== Personal bests ===
Surface	Distance	Time (s)	W (m/s)	Date	Location	Notes
Outdoor	60 metres	6.51		14 February 2025	Lubbock, USA	
Outdoor	100 metres	10.03	-3.0	1 May 2025	Lubbock, USA	
Outdoor	200 metres	20.20	+0.4	17 May 2025	Houston, USA	
Outdoor	4 × 100 metres relay	38.29	—N/a	5 May 2024	Nassau, The Bahamas	
Outdoor	4 × 400 metres relay	6.92	—N/a	11 May 2024	San Antonio, USA	

=== International championships ===
Representing Ghana
Year	Competition	Venue	Position	Event	Time	Wind (m/s)	Notes
2019	African U18 Athletics	Abidjan	6th (F)	100 m	10.96	+0.7	
2024	African Games	Accra, Ghana	4th (F)	200 m	20.85		
2024	2024 World Athletics Relays	Nassau, Bahamas	2nd (rep)	4 × 100 m	38.29		
2024	African Championships in Athletics	Douala, Cameroon	1st	4 × 100 m	38.63		
2024	Olympic Games	Paris, France	DQ	200 m			TR 24.7
2025	World Athletics Relay	Guangzhou, China	4th (rep)	4 × 100 m	38.32		SB
2025	World Athletics Championships	Tokyo, Japan	38th (h)	200 m	20.66	−0.1	

=== 100m progression ===
Year	Time	Location	Date	Notes
2019	10.79	Abidjan, Ivory Coast	16 April 2019	
2024	10.19	San Antonio, United States	11 May 2024	
2025	10.03	Lubbock, United States	1 May 2025	

=== 200m progression ===
Year	Time	Location	Date	Notes
2023	20.82	Nashville, United States	3 June 2023	
2024	20.32	San Antonio, United States	11 May 2024	
2025	20.20	Houston, United States	17 May 2025	
