= 2026 African Championships in Athletics – Men's 4 × 100 metres relay =

Men's 4 × 100 metres relay at the 2026 African Championships in Athletics
- Venue: Legon Sports Stadium
- Location: Accra, Ghana
- Dates: 14–15 May
- Winning time: 38.52

Medalists
gold medal	Cheickna Traore; Abdulrazak Kone; Magas Traoré; Arthur Cissé; Ibrahim Diomande	Ivory Coast
silver medal	Favour Ashe; James Taiwo Emmanuel; Tejiri Godwin; Chidera Ezeakor	Nigeria
bronze medal	Abdul-Rasheed Saminu; Edwin Kwabla Gadayi; Joseph Amoah; Ibrahim Fuseini	Ghana

The men's 4 × 100 metres relay event at the 2026 African Championships in Athletics was held on 14 and 15 May in Accra, Ghana.

== Results ==
=== Heats ===
Qualification: First 3 teams of each heat (Q) plus the next 2 fastest (q) qualified for the final.

Rank	Heat	Nation	Athletes	Time	Notes
1	1	Nigeria	Favour Ashe, , , Chidera Ezeakor	38.77	Q
2	2	Ghana	Edwin Kwabla Gadayi, Joseph Amoah, Ibrahim Fuseini, Abdul-Rasheed Saminu	38.69	Q
3	2	Botswana	Jayson Mandoze, Prince Phaezel Selepe, Kevin Lobatlamang, Calvin Omphile	38.80	Q
4	2	Kenya	Moses Onyango Wasike, Ronald Kiprono Koech, Dennis Mwai, Elkana Sabila Kiprotich	39.18	Q
5	1	Mauritius	Elliote Lagaillarde, Noa Bibi, Orphée Topize, Joshan Vencatasamy	39.45	Q
6	2	Ivory Coast	Atse Eudes Koffi, Ismaël Koné, , Ibrahim Diomande	39.46	q
7	1	Zimbabwe	Methembe Tshuma, Gerren Muwishi, Ngoni Makusha, Makanakaishe Charamba	39.49	Q
8	1	Senegal	Donatien Manga, , Omar Ndoye, Mamadou Fall Sarr	39.60	q
9	1	Namibia	Naseb Magano, Elton Hoeseb, Lionel Coetzee, Charles Matundu	40.33	
10	1	Democratic Republic of the Congo	David Kazadi Nyembue, ?, ?, Mulumba Mardoche Kayinda	41.17	
	2	Cameroon	Appolinaire Yinra, Raphael Ngaguele Mberlina, Duval Tsapzeu, Ibrahima Hamayadji		
	2	Angola	?, Fernando Satetula, ?, ?	DQ	FS
	1	Republic of the Congo		DNS	
	2	Gabon		DNS	
	2	Guinea-Bissau		DNS	

=== Final ===
Rank	Lane	Nation	Competitors	Time	Notes
1st place, gold medalist(s)	1	Ivory Coast	Cheickna Traore, Ismaël Koné, Magas Traoré, Arthur Cissé	38.52	
2nd place, silver medalist(s)	5	Nigeria	Favour Ashe, James Taiwo Emmanuel, Tejiri Godwin, Chidera Ezeakor	38.70	
3rd place, bronze medalist(s)	4	Ghana	Abdul-Rasheed Saminu, Edwin Kwabla Gadayi, Joseph Amoah, Ibrahim Fuseini	38.74	
4	6	Botswana	Jayson Mandoze, Prince Phaezel Selepe, Calvin Omphile, Kevin Lobatlamang	38.98	
4	3	Kenya	Mark Otieno Odhiambo, Ronald Kiprono Koech, Dennis Mwai, Elkana Sabila Kiprotich	38.98	
6	2	Senegal	Donatien Manga, Mouhamed Ba, Omar Ndoye, Mamadou Fall Sarr	39.33	
	7	Mauritius	Elliote Lagaillarde, Noa Bibi, Orphée Topize, Joshan Vencatasamy	DNF	
	8	Zimbabwe		DNS	
