= 2026 World Athletics Indoor Championships – Men's 60 metres =

Men's 60 metres at the 2026 World Athletics Indoor Championships
- Venue: Kujawsko-Pomorska Arena Toruń
- Location: Toruń, Poland
- Dates: 20 March
- Winning time: 6.41

Medalists
gold medal	Jordan Anthony	United States
silver medal	Kishane Thompson	Jamaica
bronze medal	Trayvon Bromell	United States

The men's 60 metres at the 2026 World Athletics Indoor Championships took place on the short track of the Kujawsko-Pomorska Arena Toruń in Toruń, Poland, on 20 March 2026. This was the 22nd time the event will be contested at the World Athletics Indoor Championships. Athletes qualified by achieving the entry standard or by their World Athletics Ranking in the event.

== Background ==
The men's 60 metres was contested 21 times before 2026, at every previous edition of the World Athletics Indoor Championships.

Records before the 2026 World Athletics Indoor Championships
Record	Athlete (nation)	Time (s)	Location	Date
World record	Christian Coleman (USA)	6.34	Albuquerque, United States	18 February 2018
Championship record	Christian Coleman (USA)	6.37	Birmingham, United Kingdom	3 March 2018
2026 World Lead	Jordan Anthony (USA)	6.43	Fayetteville, United States	13 February 2026

== Qualification ==
For the men's 60 metres, the qualification period ran from 1 November 2025 until 8 March 2026. Athletes could qualify by achieving the entry standard of 6.59 s. Athletes could also qualify by virtue of their World Athletics Ranking for the event or by virtue of their World Athletics Indoor Tour wildcard. There is a target number of 56 athletes.

== Results ==
=== Round 1 ===
Round 1 was held on 20 March, starting at 10:20 (UTC+1) in the morning. First 3 of each heat (Q) plus 3 fastest times (q) qualify to the semi-finals.

==== Heat 1 ====
Place	Lane	Athlete	Nation	Time	Notes
1	5	Taymir Burnet	Netherlands	6.56	Q
2	2	Tiaan Whelpton	New Zealand	6.58	Q
3	4	Samuele Ceccarelli	Italy	6.62 [.612]	Q
4	7	Dominik Kopeć	Poland	6.62 [.615]	q
5	8	Eloy Benitez	Puerto Rico	6.62 [.619]	q
6	3	Jernej Gumilar	Slovenia	6.73	
7	6	Zaid Rami Naser Nasrawi	Jordan	7.04	PB

==== Heat 2 ====
Place	Lane	Athlete	Nation	Time	Notes
1	5	Trayvon Bromell	United States	6.52	Q
2	8	Simon Verherstraeten	Belgium	6.53	Q
3	7	Pablo Matéo	France	6.60	Q
4	6	Nikola Karamanolov	Bulgaria	6.66	
5	2	Imranur Rahman	Bangladesh	6.71	SB
6	4	Travis Campbell	Canada	6.81	
7	3	Kossi Médard Nayo	Togo	6.81	PB

==== Heat 3 ====
Place	Lane	Athlete	Nation	Time	Notes
1	3	Bryan Levell	Jamaica	6.53	Q
2	6	Dominik Illovszky	Hungary	6.58	Q
3	4	Toluwabori Akinola	Ireland	6.59	Q
4	8	Guillem Crespi	Spain	6.61	q
5	7	Tyrell Davis	Canada	6.66	
6	2	Raihau Maiau	French Polynesia	6.86	SB
7	5	Aleksa Kijanović	Serbia	6.98	

==== Heat 4 ====
Place	Lane	Athlete	Nation	Time	Notes
1	7	Jordan Anthony	United States	6.54	Q
2	2	Yoshiki Kinashi	Japan	6.57	Q, PB
3	5	Emmanuel Eseme	Cameroon	6.59	Q
4	6	Jody Smith	Great Britain	6.65	
5	4	Bryant Álamo	Venezuela	6.70	
6	8	Thomas Caredda	Monaco	6.98	
7	3	Pau Funes	Gibraltar	7.20	

==== Heat 5 ====
Place	Lane	Athlete	Nation	Time	Notes
1	5	Kishane Thompson	Jamaica	6.56	Q
2	2	Ali Al Balushi	Oman	6.62	Q
3	8	Filippo Randazzo	Italy	6.63 [.621]	Q
4	7	Gabriel Aparecido Dos Santos	Brazil	6.63 [.624]	
5	4	Riku Illukka	Finland	6.64	
6	1	Julian Vargas	Bolivia	6.68	
7	6	Marc Brian Louis	Singapore	6.97	
	3	Melique García	Honduras	DNS	

==== Heat 6 ====
Place	Lane	Athlete	Nation	Time	Notes
1	3	Jeremiah Azu	Great Britain	6.55	Q
2	7	Oliwer Wdowik	Poland	6.60	Q
3	6	Yoshihide Kiryū	Japan	6.62	Q
4	8	Chen Wen-Pu	Chinese Taipei	6.63 [.622]	
5	5	Hristo Iliev	Bulgaria	6.63 [.627]	
6	2	Arão Adão Simão	Angola	6.65	NR
7	4	Strahinja Jovančević	Serbia	6.74	

==== Heat 7 ====
Place	Lane	Athlete	Nation	Time	Notes
1	4	Ackeem Blake	Jamaica	6.59	Q
2	7	Claude Itoungue Bongogne	Cameroon	6.60	Q
3	2	Erik Cardoso	Brazil	6.64	Q
4	8	Anej Čurin Prapotnik	Slovenia	6.65	
5	6	Pais Wisil	Papua New Guinea	6.66	
6	3	Noureddine Hadid	Lebanon	6.94	
7	5	Simon Daniel Tang	Northern Mariana Islands	7.62	PB

=== Semi-finals ===
The semi-finals were held on 20 March, starting at 20:16 (UTC+1) in the evening.

==== Heat 1 ====
Place	Lane	Athlete	Nation	Time	Notes
1	3	Bryan Levell	Jamaica	6.53	Q
2	6	Simon Verherstraeten	Belgium	6.56 [.553]	Q
2	5	Taymir Burnet	Netherlands	6.56 [.553]	Q
4	4	Dominik Illovszky	Hungary	6.59	
5	8	Dominik Kopeć	Poland	6.60	
6	2	Ali Al Balushi	Oman	6.61	
7	7	Pablo Matéo	France	6.62	
8	1	Filippo Randazzo	Italy	6.66	

==== Heat 2 ====
Place	Lane	Athlete	Nation	Time	Notes
1	3	Trayvon Bromell	United States	6.42	Q, WL
2	5	Kishane Thompson	Jamaica	6.47	Q
3	1	Eloy Benitez	Puerto Rico	6.57	
4	4	Oliwer Wdowik	Poland	6.58	
5	2	Samuele Ceccarelli	Italy	6.61	SB
6	6	Yoshiki Kinashi	Japan	6.63	
7	8	Erik Cardoso	Brazil	6.66	
8	7	Claude Itoungue Bongogne	Cameroon	6.66	

==== Heat 3 ====
Place	Lane	Athlete	Nation	Time	Notes
1	3	Jordan Anthony	United States	6.43	Q, PB
2	4	Jeremiah Azu	Great Britain	6.45	Q, PB
3	2	Emmanuel Eseme	Cameroon	6.52	q, NR
4	6	Ackeem Blake	Jamaica	6.55	
5	1	Guillem Crespi	Spain	6.57	PB
6	7	Toluwabori Akinola	Ireland	6.60	
7	5	Tiaan Whelpton	New Zealand	6.66	
8	8	Yoshihide Kiryū	Japan	6.69	

=== Final ===
The final was held on 20 March, starting at 21:22 (UTC+1) in the evening.

Place	Lane	Athlete	Nation	Time	Notes
1st place, gold medalist(s)	4	Jordan Anthony	United States	6.41	WL
2nd place, silver medalist(s)	7	Kishane Thompson	Jamaica	6.45 [.447]	PB
3rd place, bronze medalist(s)	6	Trayvon Bromell	United States	6.45 [.448]	
4	5	Jeremiah Azu	Great Britain	6.46	
5	1	Emmanuel Eseme	Cameroon	6.58	
6	2	Taymir Burnet	Netherlands	6.61	
7	3	Bryan Levell	Jamaica	7.69	
	8	Simon Verherstraeten	Belgium	DNF	
