= 2024 World Athletics Relays – Men's 4 × 100 metres relay =

Men's 4 × 100 metres relay at the 2024 World Athletics Relays
- Venue: Thomas Robinson Stadium, Nassau, Bahamas
- Dates: 4 May (heats) & 5 May (final)
- Nations: 32

Medalists
gold medal	Courtney Lindsey; Kenneth Bednarek; Kyree King; Noah Lyles	United States
silver medal	Brendon Rodney; Andre De Grasse; Aaron Brown; Jerome Blake	Canada
bronze medal	Méba Mickaël Zeze; Jeff Erius; Aymeric Priam; Pablo Matéo	France

The men's 4 × 100 metres relay at the 2024 World Athletics Relays has been held at the Thomas Robinson Stadium on 4 and 5 May.

== Records ==
Prior to the competition, the records were as follows:

World record	Jamaica (Nesta Carter, Michael Frater, Yohan Blake, Usain Bolt)	36.84	(United Kingdom) London, Great Britain	11 August 2012
Championships record	United States (Mike Rodgers, Justin Gatlin, Tyson Gay, Ryan Bailey)	37.38	(The Bahamas) Nassau, Bahamas	2 May 2015
World Leading	(United States) Gainesville Elite	37.67	Gainesville, United States	30 March 2024

== Program ==
- Heats : Saturday 4 May 2024, 20:27
- Final: Sunday 5 May 2024, 22:00

== Results ==
KEY:	Q	Qualified	q	Qualified as fastest times	WL	World leading	NR	National record	SB	Seasonal best	OG	2024 Olympic Games qualification

=== Heats ===
Heats Qualification: First 2 of each heat (Q) advanced to the final.

Rank	Heat	Nation	Athletes	Time	Notes
1	1	United States	Courtney Lindsey, Kenneth Bednarek, Kyree King, Noah Lyles	37.49	Q, WL, *OG, SB
1	4	Japan	Hiroki Yanagita, Koki Ueyama, Sota Miwa, Abdul Hakim Sani Brown	38.10	Q, *OG, SB
1	3	Canada	Jerome Blake, Aaron Brown, Andre De Grasse, Brendon Rodney	38.11	Q, *OG, SB
4	1	Italy	Roberto Rigali, Marcell Jacobs, Lorenzo Patta, Filippo Tortu	38.14	Q, *OG, SB
5	4	China	Wu Zhiqiang, Yan Haibin, Xie Zhenye, Chen Jiapeng	38.25	Q, *OG, SB
6	2	France	Méba Mickaël Zeze, Jeff Erius, Aymeric Priam, Pablo Matéo	38.32	Q, *OG, SB
7	2	Great Britain	Zharnel Hughes, Nethaneel Mitchell-Blake, Richard Kilty, Eugene Amo-Dadzie	38.36	Q, *OG, SB
8	2	Trinidad and Tobago	Omari Lewis, Kion Benjamin, Jerod Elcock, Eric Harrison Jr.	38.46	SB
9	2	Nigeria	Emmanuel Consider, Udodi Onwuzurike, Alaba Akintola, Seye Ogunlewe	38.47	
10	3	Jamaica	Bryan Levell, Kadrian Goldson, Ryiem Forde, Sandrey Davison	38.50	Q, *OG, SB
11	3	Australia	Jacob Despard, Calab Law, Joshua Azzopardi, Sebastian Sultana	38.50	
12	2	Switzerland	Pascal Mancini, William Reais, Felix Svensson, Timothé Mumenthaler	38.55	SB
13	1	Brazil	Rodrigo do Nascimento, Renan Correa, Erik Cardoso, Paulo André de Oliveira	38.79	SB
14	1	South Africa	Clarence Munyai, Bayanda Walaza, Akani Simbine, Benjamin Richardson	38.83	SB
15	1	Thailand	Natawat Iamudom, Chayut Khongprasit, Soraoat Dapbang, Puripol Boonson	38.87	
16	3	Netherlands	Hensley Paulina, Taymir Burnet, Xavi Mo-Ajok, Churandy Martina	38.87	
16	2	Poland	Marek Zakrzewski, Łukasz Żok, Oliwer Wdowik, Przemysław Słowikowski	38.87	SB
18	4	Cuba	Edel Amores, Reynaldo Espinosa, Shainer Rengifo, Yaniel Carrero	39.00	
19	1	Liberia	Akeem Sirleaf, Emmanuel Matadi, Jabez Reeves, Joseph Fahnbulleh	39.07	
20	4	Dominican Republic	Christopher Valdez, Franquelo Pérez, Melbin Marcelino, José González	39.08	=SB
21	4	Saudi Arabia	Abdullah Abkar Mohammed, Nasser Mahmoud Mohammed, Mohamed Daoud, Abdulaziz Abdui Atafi	39.18	=SB
22	4	Colombia	Carlos Flórez, Jhonny Rentería, Neiker Abello, Carlos Palacios	39.20	
23	1	South Korea	Simon Lee (sprinter), Kim Kuk-young, Lee Jae-seong, Ko Seung-hwan	39.25	SB
24	1	Bahamas	Samson Colebrooke, Samalie Farrington, Carlos Brown Jr., Ian Kerr	39.27	
25	1	Czech Republic	Zdeněk Stromšík, Jan Veleba, Jan Jirka, Ondřej Macík	39.31	SB
26	2	Spain	Sergio López, Arnau Monné, Daniel Rodríguez Serrano, Guillem Crespi	39.35	SB
27	4	Kenya	Mark Otieno Odhiambo, Hesborn Oduor Ochieng, Meshack Kitsubuli Babu, Ferdinand Omanyala	39.38	
28	3	Denmark	Rasmus Thornbjerg Klausen, Tobias Larsen, Frederik Schou-Nielsen, Kojo Musah	39.82	
29	2	Turkey	Emre Zafer Barnes, Batuhan Altıntaş, Kayhan Özer, Oğuz Uyar	40.04	SB
	3	Germany	Yannick Wolf, Joshua Hartmann, Lucas Ansah-Peprah, Kevin Kranz	DNF	
	3	Belgium	Antoine Snyders, Ward Merckx, Kobe Vleminckx, Valentijn Hoornaert	DQ	
	1	Ghana	Ibrahim Fuseini, Isaac Botsio, Benjamin Azamati, Joseph Paul Amoah	DQ	

=== Repechage Olympic qualifying round ===
The repechage round consisted of all countries which did not qualify for the finals. The top two countries in each repechage heat qualified for the 2024 Olympics, however there was no path for the repechage teams to qualify for the World Relays finals later in the day.

Men's 4x100 Metres Relay Olympic Qualifying Round 2 - Heat
Place	Athlete	Country	Time	Heat
1	Bayanda Walaza; Benjamin Richardson; Bradley Botshelo Nkoana; Akani Simbine	South Africa	38.08	3
2	Ibrahim Fuseini; Isaac Botsio; Benjamin Azamati; Joseph Amoah	Ghana	38.29	2
3	Sebastian Sultana; Jacob Despard; Calab Law; Joshua Azzopardi	Australia	38.46	3
4	Kevin Kranz; Lucas Ansah-Peprah; Robin Ganter; Yannik Wolf	Germany	38.57	1
5	Udodi Onwuzurike; Emmanuel Ekanem Consider; Alaba Akintola; Karlington Anunagba	Nigeria	38.57	2
6	Akeem Sirleaf; Emmanuel Matadi; Jabez Reeves; Joseph Fahnbulleh	Liberia	38.65	1
7	Enrico Güntert; Timothé Mumenthaler; Felix Svensson; William Reais	Switzerland	38.65	1
8	Rodrigo do Nascimento; Renan Gallina; Erik Cardoso; Paulo André de Oliveira	Brazil	38.72	1
9	Marek Zakrzewski; Przemysław Słowikowski; Łukasz Żok; Oliwer Wdowik	Poland	38.86	1
10	Neiker Abello; Carlos Flórez; Carlos Palacios; Óscar Baltán	Colombia	39.04	3
11	Mark Odhiambo; Mike Nyang'au; Meshack Kitsubuli Babu; Ferdinand Omanyala	Kenya	39.15	3
12	Christopher Valdez; José González; Melbin Marcelino; Franquelo Perez	Dominican Republic	39.16	2
13	Kim Kuk-young; Lee Jae-seong; Ko Seung-hwan; Taehyo Kim	South Korea	39.17	2
14	Zdeněk Stromšík; Jan Veleba; Jan Jirka; Ondřej Macík	Czech Republic	39.20	1
15	Samson Colebrooke; Samalie Farrington; Carlos Brown Jr. Ian Kerr	Bahamas	39.21	3
16	Reynaldo Espinosa; Edel Amores; Yaniel Carrero; Shainer Reginfo	Cuba	39.39	1
17	Natawat Iamudom; Soraoat Dapbang; Chayut Khongprasit; Thawatchai Himaiad	Thailand	39.41	2
18	Arnau Monné; Guillem Crespi; Daniel Rodríguez; Sergio López	Spain	39.51	3
19	Mohamed Daoud Abdullah; Nasser Mahmoud Mohammed; Abdulaziz Abdui Atafi; Abdullah Abkar Mohammed	Saudi Arabia	39.58	2
20	Aykut Ay; Kayhan Özer; Batuhan Altıntaş; Oğuz Uyar	Turkey	39.76	2
	Rasmus Thornbjerg Klausen; Kojo Musah; Simon Hansen; Frederik Schou-Nielsen	Denmark	DNF	1
	Xavi Mo-Ajok; Taymir Burnet; Hensley Paulina; Onyema Adigida	Netherlands	DQ	2
	Kobe Vleminckx; Ward Merckx; Antoine Snyders; Simon Verherstraeten	Belgium	DNF	3
	Jerod Elcock; Kion Benjamin; Eric Harrison Jr. Omari Lewis	Trinidad and Tobago	DNF	3

=== Final ===
Rank	Nation	Athletes	Time	Notes
1st place, gold medalist(s)	United States	Courtney Lindsey, Kenneth Bednarek, Kyree King, Noah Lyles	37.40	WL
2nd place, silver medalist(s)	Canada	Brendon Rodney, Andre De Grasse, Aaron Brown, Jerome Blake	37.89	SB
3rd place, bronze medalist(s)	France	Méba Mickaël Zeze, Jeff Erius, Aymeric Priam, Pablo Matéo	38.44	
4	Japan	Shoma Yamamoto, Hiroki Yanagita, Koki Ueyama, Sota Miwa	38.45	
5	Great Britain	Richard Kilty, Nethaneel Mitchell-Blake, Jona Efoloko, Zharnel Hughes	38.45	
6	China	Wu Zhiqiang, Deng Zhijian, Yan Haibin, Chen Jiapeng	38.75	
7	Jamaica	Bryan Levell, Kadrian Goldson, Ryiem Forde, Sandrey Davison	38.88	
	Italy	Roberto Rigali, Marcell Jacobs, Lorenzo Patta, Filippo Tortu	DQ	
