= Yoshiki Kinashi =

Japanese sprinter (born 2001

Personal information
- Born: 28 September 2001 (age 24)

Sport
- Sport: Athletics
- Event: Sprinting

Achievements and titles
- Personal best(s): 60m: 6.57 (Toruń, 2026); 100m: 10.20 (Tokyo, 2025)

Yoshiki Kinashi (born 28 September 2001) is a Japanese sprinter. He became national champion over 60 metres in 2024.

== Biography ==
He won the Japanese Indoor Athletics Championships in Osaka over 60 metres in 2024, with a time of 6.61 seconds.

In January 2025, he lowered his personal best over 60 metres to 6.60 seconds in Miramas. He won the 60 metres at the Keely Klassic in Birmingham, England, on 15 February 2025, in a time of 6.62 seconds. He competed at the 2025 World Athletics Indoor Championships in Nanjing in March 2025, where he reached the semi-finals.

Kinashi ran a personal best 6.57 seconds reaching the semi-finals of the 60 metres at the 2026 World Athletics Indoor Championships in Toruń, Poland.

== Personal life ==
He attended the University of Tsukuba.
