= Aymeric Priam =

French athlete (born 2000)

Personal information
- Nationality: French
- Born: 26 June 2000 (age 26) Martinique

Sport
- Sport: Athletics
- Event: Sprint

Achievements and titles
- Personal bests: 60m 6.64 (Aubiere, 2023); 100m 10.27 (Remire-Montjoly, 2024); 200m 20.96 (Remire-Montjoly, 2024)
Medal record
Men's athletics
Representing France
World Relays
Bronze medal – third place	2024 Nassau	4×100 m relay

Aymeric Priam (born 26 June 2000) is a French sprinter.

== Biography ==
A member of Racing Club Martinique, he was French U20 champion over 100 metres in 2019 in Angers.

Priam won the French junior titles in 60m (indoors), 100m and 200m in 2021 and February 2022, he retained his junior 60m title in Lyon. He was selected to be part of the France relay squad for the 2022 European Athletics Championships in Munich.

Priam was part of the French 4 × 100 m relay team which won bronze at the 2024 World Athletics Relays in Nassau, Bahamas in May 2024.

He competed at the 2025 World Athletics Relays in China in the Men's 4 × 100 metres relay in May 2025. On the second day of the competition he helped France secure a qualifying place for the upcoming World Championships.

In September 2025, he competed in the men's 4 x 100 metres at the 2025 World Championships in Tokyo, Japan, as the French team placed seventh.

In May 2026, he ran at the 2026 World Athletics Relays in the men's 4 × 100 metres relay in Gaborone, Botswana.

== Personal life ==
From Martinique, he remains based there between international races. His father Marc Priam remains part of his coaching team.
