= List of Angolan records in athletics =

The following are the national records in athletics in Angola maintained by its national athletics federation: Federacao Angolana de Atletismo (FAA).

== Outdoor ==
Key to tables: Awaiting ratification Record not kept by FAA Not ratified or later rescinded by FAA

=== Men ===
Event	Record	Athlete	Date	Meet	Place	Ref.
60 m	6.76	Arão Adão Simão	17 February 2026	ACNW Open Meet	Potchefstroom, South Africa	
100 m	10.31 (+0.2 m/s)	Marcos Santos	3 August 2024	Olympic Games	Paris, France	
200 m	20.96 (−1.1 m/s)	Marcos Santos	21 March 2024	African Games	Accra, Ghana	
400 m	47.38	João Paulo	23 July 1995		Lisbon, Portugal	
400 m	47.2 h	Barceló de Carvalho	16 September 1969		Athens, Greece	
800 m	1:47.54	João N'Tyamba	27 June 1992	African Championships	Belle Vue Maurel, Mauritius	
1000 m	2:18.82	João N'Tyamba	27 July 1994		Hamburg, Germany	
1500 m	3:39.54	João N'Tyamba	3 August 1992	Olympic Games	Barcelona, Spain	
3000 m	7:58.5 h	João N'Tyamba	3 March 1996		San Diego, United States	
5000 m	13:40.12	Aurélio Miti	11 August 1995	World Championships	Gothenburg, Sweden	
5 km (road)	13:44	Aurélio Miti	23 November 1997	Corrida de Campeones	Los Angeles, United States	
10,000 m	28:31.09	João N'Tyamba	24 August 1999	World Championships	Seville, Spain	
10,000 m	28:20.0 h	João N'Tyamba	5 May 2001		Lubango, Angola	
10 km (road)	28:14	João N'Tyamba	5 January 1997	Corrida Internacional de San Fernando	Punta del Este, Uruguay	
15 km (road)	44:08	Aurélio Miti	12 July 1998		Utica, United States	
10 miles (road)	48:01	Aurélio Miti	27 October 2001	Seaside 10 Miler	Ocean City, United States	
Half marathon	1:02:38	João N'Tyamba	20 August 2000		Rio de Janeiro, Brazil	
Marathon	2:11:40	João N'Tyamba	30 September 2001	Berlin Marathon	Berlin, Germany	
110 m hurdles	14.11 (−1.2 m/s)	Jonas Mateus	8 June 2004		Noisy-le-Grand, France	
400 m hurdles	51.95	Wilson André	28 July 1995		Lisbon, Portugal	
3000 m steeplechase	8:56.79	Aurélio Miti	30 July 1994		Lisbon, Portugal	
High jump	2.10 m	Orlando Bonifácio	9 May 1982		Luanda, Angola	
Pole vault	4.05 m	José Francisco	11 June 1989		Luanda, Angola	
Long jump	7.52 m NWI	Afonso Ferraz	24 September 1991	All-Africa Games	Cairo, Egypt	
Triple jump	16.43 m (+2.0 m/s)	António dos Santos	2 September 1988	African Championships	Annaba, Algeria	
Shot put	14.58 m	Hugo Pereira	22 March 1980		Luanda, Angola	
Discus throw	49.72 m	António Réais	23 February 1991		Luanda, Angola	
Hammer throw	52.44 m	Jorge Cruz	6 June 1982		Luanda, Angola	
Javelin throw	64.73 m	Esmeraldino Trigo	9 May 2018		Lisbon, Portugal	
Decathlon	6381 pts	Afonso Deslandes	4–5 August 1989		Madrid, Spain	
Decathlon	100m / Long jump / Shot put / High jump / 400m / 110m H / Discus / Pole vault / Javelin / 1500m; 11.38 / 6.88 m / 10.90 m / 1.90 m / 50.18 / 17.51 / 29.00 m / 3.80 m / 39.00 m / 4:29.00					
20 km walk (road)						
50 km walk (road)						
4 × 100 m relay	40.41	Angola; Mauro Gaspar; Osvaldo Alexandre; Prisca Baltazar; Kevin Oliveira	12 August 2014	African Championships	Marrakech, Morocco	
4 × 400 m relay	3:12.92	Angola; Jacinto Macamba; Agostino Falcão; Joao Capindiça; João Paulo	26 September 1991	All-Africa Games	Cairo, Egypt	

=== Women ===
Event	Record	Athlete	Date	Meet	Place	Ref.
100 m	11.69 NWI	Antónia de Jesus	30 June 1995		Porto, Portugal	
200 m	24.61 (+0.3 m/s)	Adriana Alves	17 June 2017	SL Benfica Meeting	Lisbon, Portugal	
400 m	55.34	Guilhermina Cruz	15 August 1993	World Championships	Stuttgart, Germany	
800 m	2:06.53	Lilian Silva	15 June 2006		Luso, Portugal	
1500 m	4:17.35	Neide Dias	29 June 2019	Meeting de São João	Braga, Portugal	
3000 m	9:27.34	Neide Dias	1 June 2019		Maia, Portugal	
5000 m	16:02.0 h	Ernestina Paulino	3 August 2008		Luanda, Angola	
10,000 m	35:06.9 h	Ernestina Paulino	2 August 2008		Luanda, Angola	
10 km (road)	34:09	Neide Dias	12 January 2019	Portuguese 10 km Road Running Championships	Oeiras, Portugal	
15 km (road)	51:12	Ernestina Paulino	31 December 2008	São Silvestre de Luanda	Luanda, Angola	
Half marathon	1:17:04	Neide Dias	20 January 2019	Manuela Machado Half Marathon	Viana do Castelo, Portugal	
Marathon	3:48:29	Cristina Saraiva	2 November 2014		Porto, Portugal	
100 m hurdles	14.01 (+1.6 m/s)	Witiney Barata	17 June 2012		Lisbon, Portugal	
400 m hurdles	58.34	Delfina Joaquim	11 July 1999		Lisbon, Portugal	
3000 m steeplechase	10:56.77	Lílian Silva	29 May 2010		Póvoa de Varzim, Portugal	
High jump	1.65 m	Xenia Fortes	25 April 1996		Viseu, Portugal	
Pole vault	3.60 m	Lidia Nicole Alberto	14 June 2015		Vagos, Portugal	
Long jump	5.84 m (−0.1 m/s)	Ungudi Quiawacana	29 July 2007		Lisbon, Portugal	
Triple jump	13.49 m (+1.8 m/s) (Note: Teresa N'Zola became a French citizen in 2003)	Teresa N'Zola	27 July 2002		Angers, France	
Shot put	12.90 m	Carla Carvalho	24 August 1981	Central African Games	Luanda, Angola	
Discus throw	44.16 m	Filomena Silva	18 May 1980		Luanda, Angola	
Hammer throw	52.55 m	Mafuta Maketa	7 August 2011		Leiria, Portugal	
Javelin throw	43.77 m	Indira Manuel	14 June 2003		Elvas, Portugal	
Heptathlon	4856 pts	Witiney Barata	26–27 May 2012		Rio Maior, Portugal	
Heptathlon	100m H / High jump / Shot put / 200m / Long jump / Javelin / 800m; 13.95w / 1.61 m / 10.24 m / 26.82w / 5.60 m w / 30.90 m / 2:35.24					
20 km walk (road)						
50 km walk (road)						
4 × 100 m relay	49.8 h	Angola; Maria Machado; M. Milagre; L. Rodrigues; Alda Mauricio	27 August 1981	Central African Games	Luanda, Angola	
4 × 400 m relay	4:06.4 h	Angola; Maria Machado; Isabel André; Francisca Xavier; Gertrudes Sepulveda	27 August 1981	Central African Games	Luanda, Angola	

== Indoor ==
=== Men ===
Event	Record	Athlete	Date	Meet	Place	Ref.
50 m	5.99	Blarry Matuvanga	14 February 2004		Liévin, France	
60 m	6.79	Alexandre Osvaldo	16 February 2014		São Caetano do Sul, Brazil	
60 m	6.65	Arão Adão Simão	20 March 2026	World Championships	Toruń, Poland	
200 m	21.93	Miguel Angel Makangu	22 January 2009		Eaubonne, France	
400 m	49.37	Milton Hassany	14 February 2015		Pombal, Portugal	
800 m	1:54.95	Tulio António	24 February 2008		Pombal, Portugal	
1500 m	3:46.48	Túlio Antonio	21 February 2009		Pombal, Portugal	
3000 m	7:53.72 (Note: outdoor mark ratified as absolute record)	João N'Tyamba	7 February 1993	Sparkassen Cup	Stuttgart, Germany	
60 m hurdles	7.91	Jonas Mateus	14 January 2007		Paris, France	
High jump	1.96 m	António Afonso Deslandes	16 February 1991		Aveiro, Portugal	
Pole vault	3.60 m	Haivan Almeida	15 February 2020		Pombal, Portugal	
Long jump	7.34 m	António Santos	16 February 1992		Aveiro, Portugal	
Triple jump	15.95 m	António Santos	10 February 1992		Braga, Portugal	
Shot put	10.52 m	António Afonso Deslandes	24 January 1992		Madrid, Spain	
Heptathlon	4630 pts	António Afonso Deslandes	24–25 January 1992		Madrid, Spain	
Heptathlon	60m / Long jump / Shot put / High jump / 60m H / Pole vault / 1000m; 7.43 / 6.24 m / 10.52 m / 1.87 m / 8.65 / 3.50 m / 2:52.03					
5000 m walk						
4 × 400 m relay						

=== Women ===
Event	Record	Athlete	Date	Meet	Place	Ref.
60 m	7.53	Antonia de Jesús	31 January 2004		Espinho, Portugal	
200 m	24.82	Antónia de Jesús	1 February 2004		Espinho, Portugal	
400 m	58.19	Milclénia Francisco	27 February 2016		Pombal, Portugal	
800 m	2:07.15	Lilian Silva	26 January 2008		Pombal, Portugal	
1500 m	4:21.20	Lilian Silva	2 February 2008		Espinho, Portugal	
3000 m	9:47.49	Lilian Silva	21 February 2009		Pombal, Portugal	
60 m hurdles	8.86	Acioly Pinto	4 February 2018		Paris, France	
High jump	1.64 m	Xenia Fortes	15 February 1998		Espinho, Portugal	
Pole vault	3.50 m	Lidia Nicole Alberto	25 January 2015		Braga, Portugal	
Long jump	5.78 m	Ungudi Quiwacana	24 January 2009		Espinho, Portugal	
Triple jump	13.82 m (Note: outdoor mark ratified as absolute record)	Theresa N'Zola	1 March 2003		Aubière, France	
Shot put	7.74 m	Liliana Kivoloca	2 December 2017		Lyon, France	
Shot put	11.22 m	Liliana Cá	23 February 2002		Espinho, Portugal	
Pentathlon	2681 pts	Liliana Kivoloca	16 December 2017		Aubière, France	
Pentathlon	60m H / High jump / Shot put / Long jump / 800m; 9.65 / 1.41 m / 7.51 m / 4.44 m / 2:37.80					
3000 m walk						
4 × 400 m relay						
