= Neide Dias =

Angolan runner

Personal information
- Born: 11 August 1987 (age 38)

Sport
- Country: Angola/Portugal
- Sport: Athletics
- Events: 800 metres; 1500 metres

Neide Dias (born 11 August 1987) is an Angolan-Portuguese runner who specializes in the 800 and 1500 metres.

She finished eighth at the 2004 Ibero-American Championships (400 m), sixth at the 2009 Lusophony Games (800 m), ninth at the 2015 African Games (1500 m) and eighth at the 2019 African Games (1500 m).

She also competed at the 2010 Ibero-American Championships (800 m), 2015 African Games (800 m) and the 2019 World Championships (1500 m) without reaching the final.

Her personal best times are 2:07.01 minutes in the 800 metres, achieved in June 2014 in Bilbao; and 4:17.35 minutes in the 1500 metres, achieved in June 2019 in Braga. The latter is the current Angolan record. Dias transferred to represent Portugal in National Representative Competitions from 2 August 2023.
