= PJ Austin =

American sprinter (born 2000)

Pjai Austin
Personal information
- Full name: Pjai Austin
- Nickname: Peezy
- Nationality: USA
- Born: September 19, 2000 (age 25) Los Angeles, California
- Home town: Los Angeles, California
- Education: Maricopa High School; University of Arizona; University of Florida
- Height: 177 cm (5 ft 10 in)
- Weight: 74 kg (163 lb)

Sport
- Sport: Athletics
- Events: 100 metres 60 metres Long jump
- College team: Arizona Wildcats; Florida Gators
- Turned pro: 2023
- Coached by: Sheldon Hutchinson; Francesca Green; Mike Holloway

Achievements and titles
- National finals: 2019 USA U20s; • Long jump, 1st (gold); 2021 NCAA Indoors; • Long jump, 13th; 2022 NCAAs; • 4 × 100 m, 2nd (silver); 2023 NCAA Indoors; • Long jump, 7th; • 60 m, 3rd (bronze); 2023 NCAAs; • 100 m, 5th; • 4 × 100 m, 2nd (silver)
- Personal bests: 100 m: 9.89 (+1.3) (2023) 60 m: 6.53 (2023) Long jump: 8.01 m (2023)
Medal record
Men's athletics
Representing United States
World Relays
Gold medal – first place	2026 Gaborone	4×100 m relay
Representing the United States
Pan American U20 Championships
Silver medal – second place	2019 San José	Long jump
- Updated on January 15, 2024

Pjai Austin (born September 19, 2000), also known as PJ Austin, is an American sprinter. At the 2023 NCAA Division I Outdoor Track and Field Championships, he ran 9.89 for 100 metres in the semifinals and 9.97 in the finals, the former making him the 9th-fastest runner in the world that year.

== Career ==
As a prep for Maricopa High School, Austin competed in basketball, gridiron football, and track and field. He won the CIF California State Meet in the 4 × 100 metres, and set a school record in the long jump.

In fall 2018, he joined the Arizona Wildcats track and field team not as a sprinter, but as a jumper. He had a successful freshman season, jumping what was at one point the farthest jump of 2019 by any collegiate freshman. At the 2019 Pan American U20 Athletics Championships, Austin won the silver medal in the long jump behind Wayne Pinnock. It was a close competition, as both athletes were measured at 7.82 m but Pinnock had the better next-best jump on countback.

In 2020, Austin transferred to the Florida Gators track and field program, which he would compete at through 2023. He qualified for his first collegiate nationals at the 2021 NCAA Division I Indoor Track and Field Championships, finishing 13th overall in the long jump.

With a runner-up finish in the 4 × 100 m at the 2022 NCAA Championships, Austin began to specialize in sprinting in 2023. He finished 3rd in the 60 metres at the 2023 NCAA Division I Indoor Track and Field Championships, better than his 7th-place finish in the long jump.

Austin's biggest breakthrough came in the spring of 2023, at the 2023 NCAA Division I Outdoor Track and Field Championships. In the East Preliminary Round two weeks prior, he had run 9.88 seconds for 100 m, but with a 5.5 metres/second tailwind that greatly aided the result and made it ineligible for records. At the championships in the first semi-final, Austin nearly repeated this performance with a 9.89 clocking, this time with a legal +1.3 m/s wind. Although he could not repeat this in the finals and only finished 5th, the mark was nonetheless a personal best by 0.2 seconds. Austin competed in the 100 m at the 2023 USA Outdoor Track and Field Championships and won his first-round heat, but he did not advance past the semi-finals.

== Personal life ==
Austin is from Los Angeles, California where he attended Maricopa High School. He didn't want to compete in track initially, but he was convinced by his football coaches to try it his freshman year. On his first ever attempt at the long jump, he jumped over 20 feet (6.1 m).

== Statistics ==
=== Personal best progression ===
100 m progression
#	Mark	Pl.	Competition	Venue	Date	Ref.
1	10.93	13th	Nike Chandler Rotary Elite	Chandler, AZ	March 23, 2018	
2	10.86	4th (Round B)	Willie Williams Classic College	Tucson, AZ	March 15, 2019	
3	10.66	4th (Round B)	Jim Click Shootout	Tucson, AZ	April 5, 2019	
4	10.52	(silver) (Round B)	Desert Heat Classic	Tucson, AZ	April 26, 2019	
5	10.17	(bronze) (Heat 4)	Clyde Littlefield Texas Relays	Austin, TX	March 24, 2022	
6	10.10	1st place, gold medalist(s)	Pepsi Florida Relays	Gainesville, FL	March 31, 2023	
7	10.09	3rd place, bronze medalist(s)	Tom Jones Memorial	Gainesville, FL	April 14, 2023	
8	9.89	(gold) (Semifinal 1)	NCAA Division I Men's Outdoor Track and Field Championships	Austin, TX	June 6, 2023	

Long Jump progression
#	Mark	Pl.	Competition	Venue	Date	Ref.
1	7.01 m	2nd place, silver medalist(s)	Nike Chandler Rotary Elite	Chandler, AZ	March 23, 2018	
2	7.07 m	1st place, gold medalist(s)	Valley Championships, Queen Creek HS	Queen Creek, AZ	April 19, 2018	
3	7.37 m	2nd place, silver medalist(s)	Larry Wieczorek Invitational	Iowa City, IA	January 18, 2019	
4	7.39 m	1st place, gold medalist(s)	NAU Tune Up	Flagstaff, AZ	February 14, 2019	
5	7.82 m	2nd place, silver medalist(s)	Pan American U20 Athletics Championships	San José, Costa Rica	July 18, 2019	
6	7.95 m	5th	SEC Indoor Track & Field Championships	Fayetteville, AR	February 25, 2021	
7	8.01 m	7th	NCAA Division I Men's Indoor Track and Field Championships	Albuquerque, NM	March 9, 2023	
