= Lance Lang =

American sprinter (born 2001)

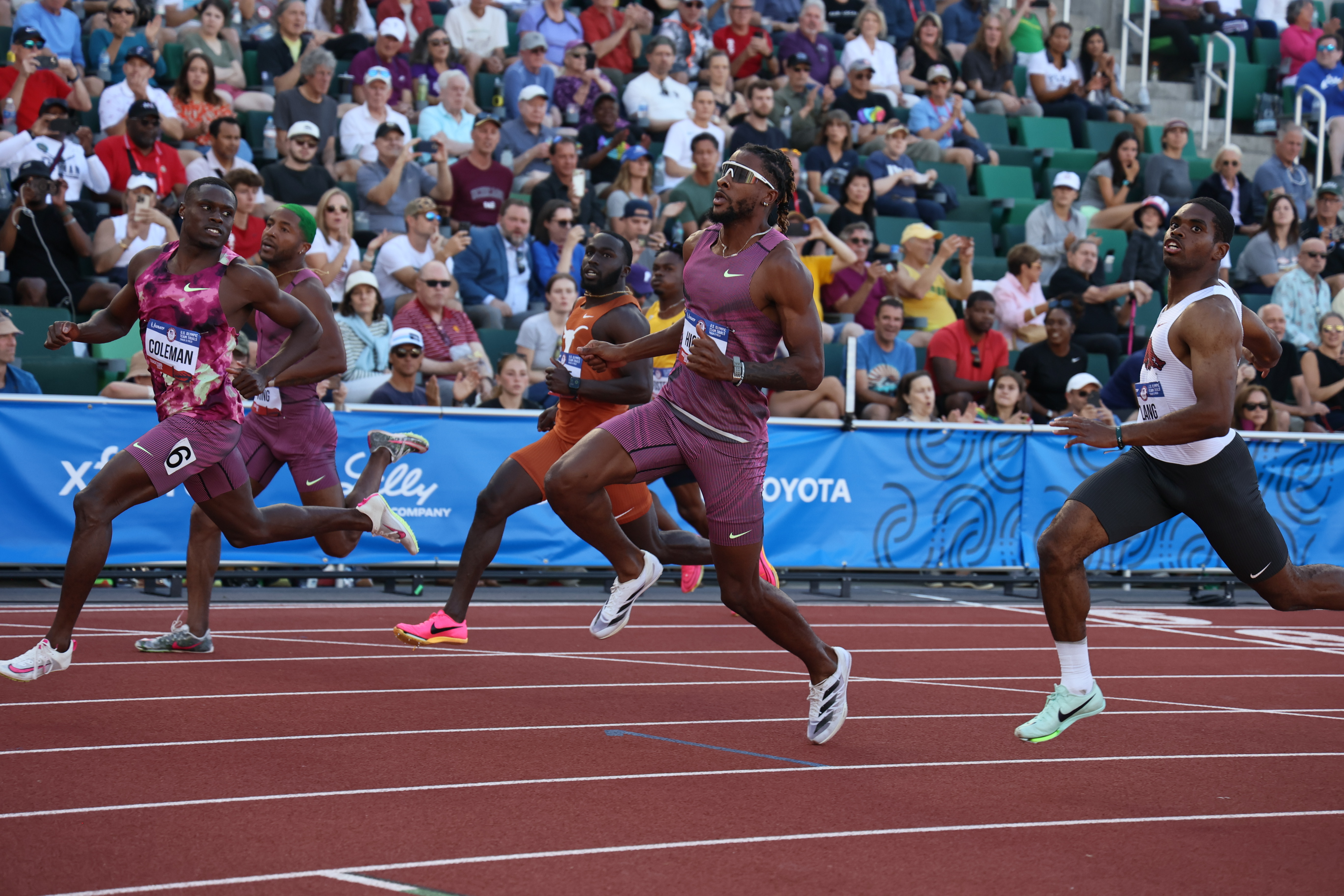
- Lang in 2024

Personal information
- Born: February 1, 2001 (age 25)

Sport
- Sport: Athletics
- Event: Sprint

Achievements and titles
- Personal bests: 100m: 10.03 (2024); 200m: 20.04 (2024); 400m: 45.70 (2025); Indoor; 60m: 6.61 (2022); 200m: 21.33 (2022); 400m: 46.30 (2025)
Medal record
Men's athletics
Representing United States
World Relays
Gold medal – first place	2026 Gaborone	4×100 m relay

Lance Lang (born 1 February 2002) is an American sprinter.

== Biography ==
From Florissant, Missouri, Lang attended McCluer North High School in St. Louis, Missouri and began his athletics career while in the eighth grade, training in St. Louis with the Ultimate Speed Academy initially to keep his fitness for football, but qualified for the 2015 AAU Junior Olympics in the 100 metres, 200 metres, long jump, as also ran a leg on the club's third-place 4 x 400 metres relay. In 2017, he set new personal bests of 10.63 and 21.59 in the 100m and 200m. In 2019 he ran 6.72 seconds for the 60 metres.

Competing for the University of Kentucky, Lang was a finalist at the 2021 NCAA Division I Indoor Championships, placing sixth in the 200 metres with a time of 20.88 seconds. He later transferred the University of Arkansas. At the 2024 SEC Outdoor Championships, Lang ran the 100 metres in 10.16 and the 200 metres in a personal best 20.04 seconds. He ran a wind-assisted 9.97 (+2.5) for the 100 m at the NCAA Division I West First Rounds in May.

Lang was a finalist of the 100 metres at the 2024 US Olympic Team Trials, and ran a personal best of 10.03 seconds, a University of Arkansas record until broken by Jordan Anthony the following year.

Lang competed for the United States at the 2025 World Athletics Relays in China in the Men's 4 × 400 metres relay in May 2025.

Lang was named in the United States team for the 2026 World Athletics Relays in Gaborone, Botswana. He ran as part of the men's the 4 x 100 metres relay which won their heat in 37.77 seconds to earn a qualification spot for the final on the opening day. The following day, the quartet won the final in a time of 37.43 seconds ahead of defending champions South Africa who set a new African record.
