= Angolan Athletics Federation =

Governing body for athletics in Angola

- Federação Angolana de Atletismo
- Sport: Athletics
- Abbreviation: FAA
- Founded: February 19, 1979
- Affiliation: IAAF
- Affiliation date: 1981
- Regional affiliation: CAA
- Headquarters: Luanda
- President: Bernardo João
- Vice president: João Ntyamba
- Secretary: Carlos Rosa

Official website
- angolatletismo.com
- (Angola)

The Angolan Athletics Federation (Portuguese: Federação Angolana de Atletismo, FAA) is the governing body for the sport of athletics in Angola. Current president is Bernardo João. He was elected in November 2016 for the period 2016–2020.

== History ==
FAA was founded on February 19, 1979, and was affiliated to the IAAF in the year 1981.

== Affiliations ==
- International Association of Athletics Federations (IAAF)
- Confederation of African Athletics (CAA)
- Asociación Iberoamericana de Atletismo (AIA; Ibero-American Athletics Association)

Moreover, it is part of the following national organisations:

- Angolan Olympic Committee (COA; Portuguese: Comité Olímpico Angolano)

== National records ==
FAA maintains the national records.
