= Sharry Dodin =

Seychellois sprinter (born 1998)

Personal information
- Full name: Sharry Marius Dodin
- Nationality: Seychellois
- Born: 8 June 1998 (age 28) Victoria, Seychelles
- Height: 173 cm (5 ft 8 in)
- Weight: 74 kg (163 lb)

Sport
- Country: Seychelles
- Sport: Track and field
- Event(s): 100 metre, 200 metre

Achievements and titles
- Personal best: 100 metre - 10.47 seconds 200 metre - 21.38 seconds

Sharry Marius Dodin (born 8 June 1998 in Victoria) is a Seychellois sprinter who specializes in the 100 metre and 200 metre distances.

== Career ==
Dodin's first international competition was the 2015 African Youth Athletics Championships where he competed in the 100 m and 200 m events. He was unable to make it past the semifinals in both events, running top times of 11.11 seconds for the 100 metres, and 22.65 seconds for the 200 metres.

In 2017, Dodin competed at the 2017 African U20 Championships in Athletics in Tlemcen, Algeria. He competed in the men's 100 m and 200 m events. His 200-metre run wasn't successful, running 21.43 seconds in his heat. In the 100 metres, Dodin made it to the finals running 10.58 seconds and earning the bronze medal. He was the Seychelles only medallist at the championships.

Also in 2017, Dodin competed in the Francophone Games in the 100 m event. He was running with another Seychellois sprinter, Dylan Sicobo, who later won the event and set a national record. Dodin, however, ran fourth in heat three in 10.77 seconds.

The 2018 Commonwealth Games in Gold Coast, Australia was Dodin's only major international competition in 2018. He competed in the 100 m and 200 m events. In the 100 metres, Dodin committed a false start and was disqualified. In the 200 metres, he ran 21.38 seconds, but this time couldn't carry him to the quarterfinals.
