= Marcos Santos =

Angolan sprinter

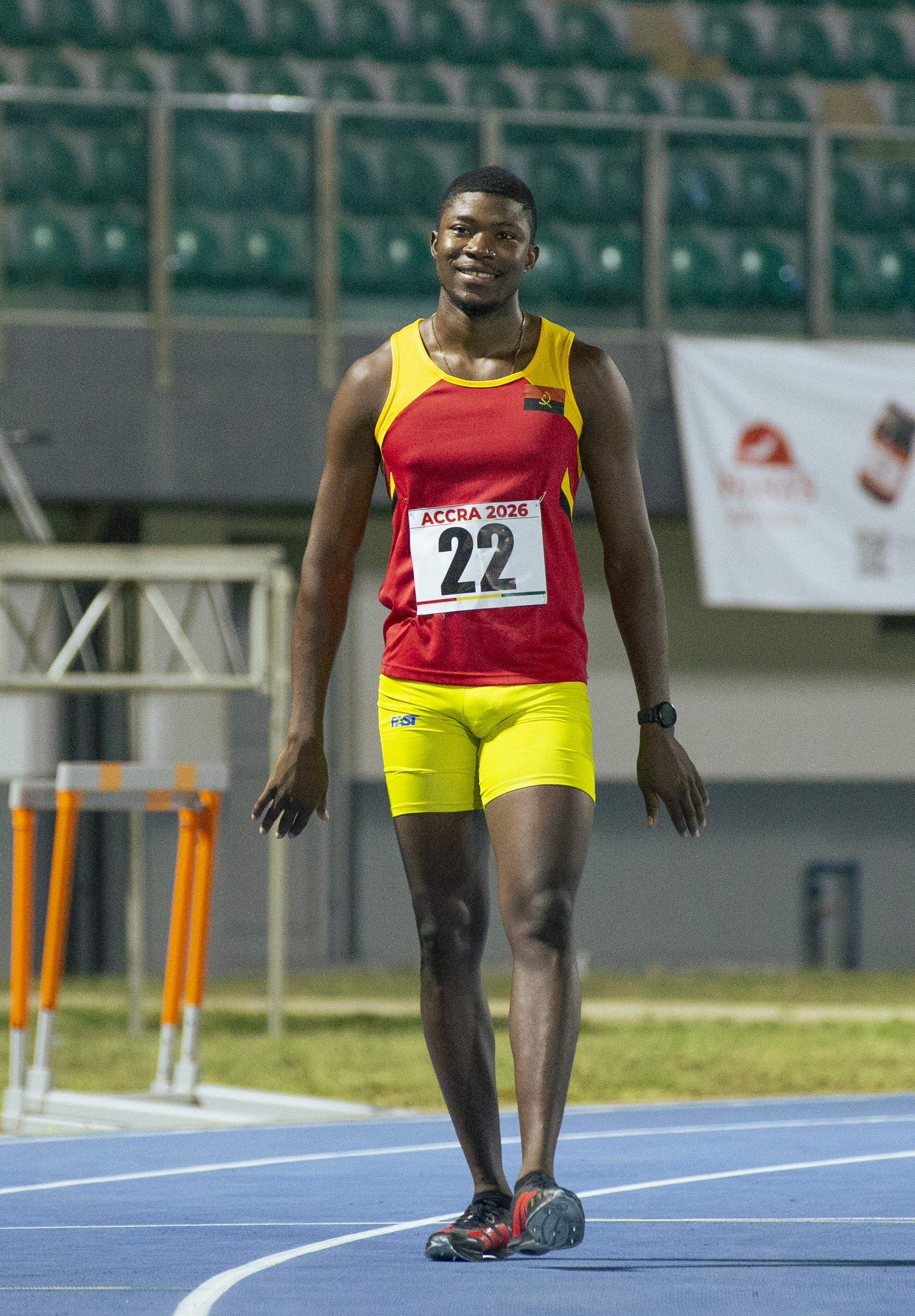
- Marcos Santos at the 2026 African Athletics Championships

Personal information
- Born: Marcos Cassange Santos; 15 January 2004 (age 22) Angola
- Height: 1.85 m (6 ft 1 in)

Sport
- Sport: Athletics
- Events: 100 metres; 200 metres
- Club: Petro de Luanda

Achievements and titles
- Personal bests: 100m: 10.31 (2024, NR); 200m: 20.96 (2024, NR)

Marcos Cassange Santos (born 15 January 2004) is an Angolan sprinter. As a junior, he set the junior national record in the men's 200 metres and competed at the 2022 World Athletics Championships though was disqualified in the heats. He also competed at the 2023 African U20 Championships in Athletics and the 2023 World Athletics Championships, setting a national record at the latter.

He trained in Brazil for the 2023 African Games and 2024 Summer Olympics. For the latter, he ran in the men's 200 metres and broke the national record in the heats. At the 2024 Summer Games, he became the first Angolan athletics competitor to qualify for a round past the preliminaries after he ran in a national-record setting time of 10.31 seconds.

== Biography ==
Marcos Cassange Santos was born on 15 January 2004 in Angola. His athletics club is Petro de Luanda, with his personal coach being Santana João dos Santos. He studied with a major in telecommunications. As a junior, he set the junior national record in the men's 200 metres at a time of 22.12 seconds and trained at the Estádio dos Coqueiros in Luanda. At the 2022 World Athletics Championships in Eugene, Oregon, United States, he competed in the men's 200 metres though was disqualified in his heat after he had crossed into another lane.

Santos competed at the 2023 African U20 Championships in Athletics in Ndola, Zambia, in the men's U20 100 and 200 metres. In the former, he ran in a time of 10.59 seconds in the heats and qualified for the semifinals. He ran in a time of 10.62 in the semifinals, not qualifying him for the finals. In the 200 metres, he ran in a time of 21.23 seconds in the preliminaries and advanced to the semifinals. He ran in a time of 21.33 seconds in his semifinal, placing him second for his round and advanced to the finals. During the finals, he placed fifth overall with a time of 21.52 seconds. He also competed at the 2023 World Athletics Championships in Budapest, Hungary. He competed in the men's 200 metres and set a national record with a time of 21.05 seconds, breaking the previous national record held by Afonso Ferraz set in 1992.

In his preparations for the 2023 African Games and 2024 Summer Olympics, he was coached by Jaime Neto at a training camp in Brazil. For the 2023 African Games, he competed at the men's 200 metres. He ran a time of 20.96 in the preliminaries, setting a new national record. He was eliminated in the semi-finals after he ran in a time of 21.26 seconds. He then qualified for the 2024 Summer Olympics through a universality slot, which allows underrepresented nations to compete and for National Olympic Committee (NOC) to send athletes despite not meeting the standard qualification criteria. At the preliminaries of the men's 100 metres at the 2024 Summer Olympics, Santos ran in a time of 10.31 seconds to break the national record and advance further. He would be the first Angolan athletics competitor to advance to a further round at an Olympic Games. In his next round, he ran in a time of 10.40 seconds and did not advance further. He became the national champion in the 100 metres in 2024 after the games.
