= Abdul-Rasheed Saminu =

Ghanaian athlete (born 1997)

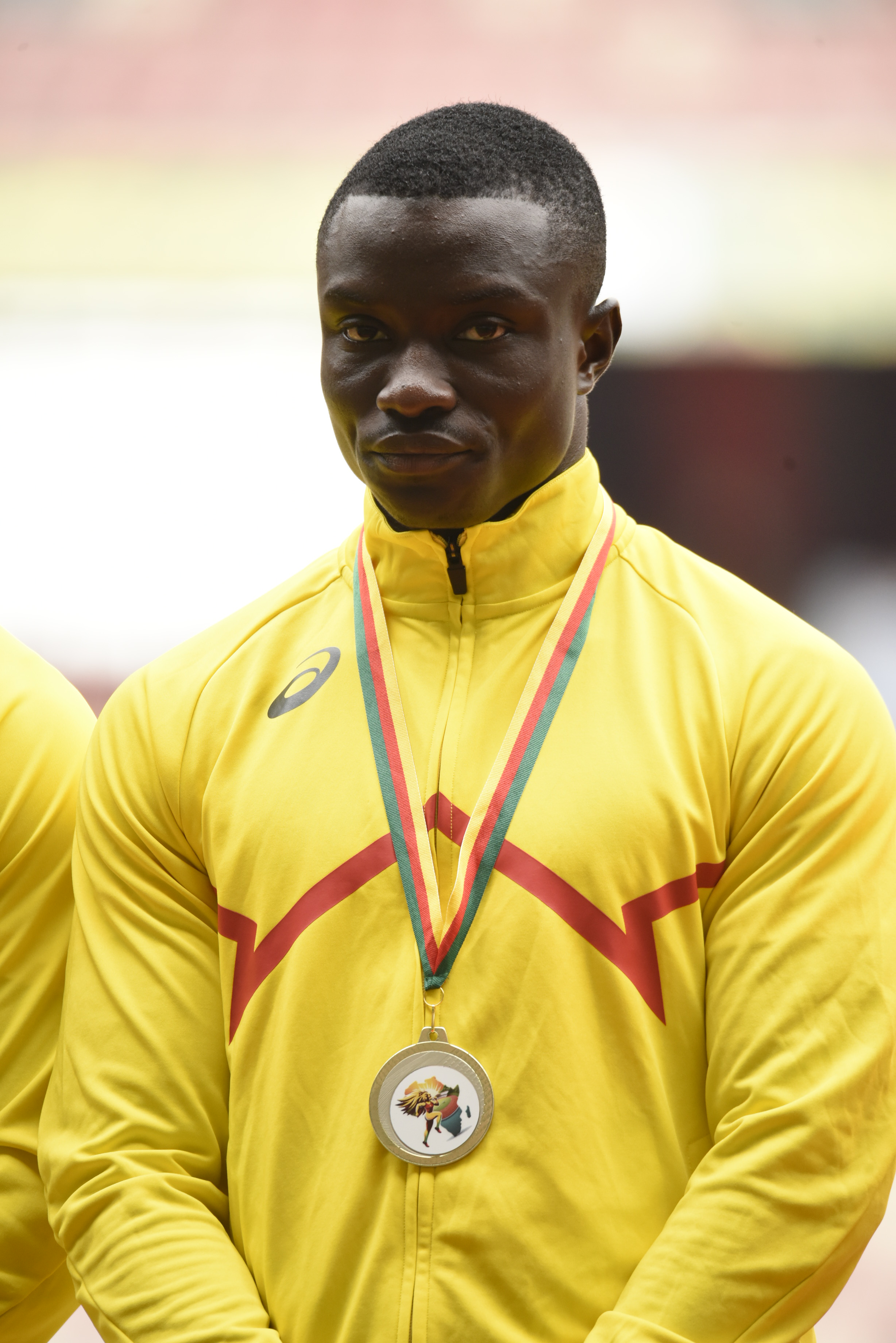

Personal information
- Nationality: Ghanaian
- Born: 6 October 1997 (age 29) Kukuo, Ghana

Sport
- Sport: Athletics
- Event: Sprint

Achievements and titles
- Personal bests: 60m: 6.57 (Birmingham, 2024); 100m: 9.84 (Jacksonville, 2025) NR; 200m: 20.12 (Eugene, 2024)
Medal record
Representing Ghana
Men's athletics
African Championships
Gold medal – first place	2024 Douala	4×100 m relay
Bronze medal – third place	2026 Accra	4×100 m relay

Abdul-Rasheed Saminu (born 6 October 1997) is a Ghanaian sprinter. He represented Ghana at the 2024 Olympic Games and 2025 World Athletics Championships.

== Early life ==
Saminu is from the village of Nanumba in the Northern part of Ghana where he was a keen football player before being encouraged towards athletics. He attended the American universities Florida Memorial University and the University of South Florida after being recruited by USF head coach Erik Jenkins.

== Career ==
Saminu ran a wind-aided (+3.6 m/s) 9.95 seconds for the 100m at the South Florida Invitational in April 2024.

Saminu won the gold in the 100m, 200m and 4 × 100 m relay at the AAC Championships in May 2024 in San Antonio, United States. His efforts included a personal best time in the 100m of 10.03 seconds in a legal wind (-0.8) and ran a time of 20.34 seconds in the 200m.

Saminu ran 10.02 seconds for the 100m at the 2024 NCAA Division I Outdoor Track and Field Championships in Eugene, Oregon. In the 200 metres on the same day he ran a personal best of 20.12 in the 200 metres. Later that month, he was part of the Ghana 4 × 100 m relay team that won gold at the African Championships in Douala, Cameroon.

He competed in the 100 metres at the 2024 Paris Olympics, where he reached the semi-finals. He also competed in the men's 4 × 100 m relay at the Games.

In 2025, he set an early world lead with a time of 9.86 seconds for the 100 metres. In September, he was a semi-finalist in the 100 metres at the 2025 World Championships in Tokyo, Japan. He also ran in the men's 4 x 100 metres relay at the championships as the Ghana team placed fourth.

Sprinter Abdul-Rasheed Saminu was named Male Athlete of the Year at the 2025 Stampede of Champions Awards, recognising his outstanding performance in athletics.

In May, he ran at the 2026 World Athletics Relays in the men's 4 × 100 metres relay in Gaborone, Botswana. In June, he placed third in a wind-assisted 9.88 seconds for the 100 metres at the LA Grand Prix. On 14 July, he placed second in 10.01 seconds for the 100 m at the István Gyulai Memorial, in Budapest. He competed in the 100 metres at the 2026 Commonwealth Games in Glasgow, Scotland, reaching the semi-finals. He also ran in the men's 4 × 100 m relay.

== Career statistics ==
Figures from World Athletics profile.

=== Personal bests ===
Surface	Distance	Time (s)	W (m/s)	Date	Location	Notes
Outdoor	60 metres	6.53		15 March 2025	Virginia Beach, United States	
Outdoor	100 metres	9.84	+1.5	19 July 2025	Powder Springs, United States	=NR
Outdoor	200 metres	20.12	-0.1	7 June 2024	Eugene, United States	
Outdoor	4 × 100 metres relay	38.05	—N/a	30 May 2025	Jacksonville, United States	
Outdoor	4 × 200 metres relay	1:21.06	—N/a	25 April 2025	Philadelphia, United States	
Outdoor	4 × 400 metres relay	3:16.84	—N/a	16 March 2024	Tampa, USA	

=== International championships ===
Representing Ghana
Year	Competition	Venue	Position	Event	Time	Wind (m/s)	Notes
2019	African U20 Athletics	Abidjan, Ivory Coast	7th (F)	100 m	10.77	+0.5	
2019	African U20 Athletics	Abidjan, Ivory Coast	5th (SF)	200m	21.58	-0.2	
2022	FASU games	Nairobi, Kenya	2nd	100 m	10.31	+0.5	
2022	2022 Commonwealth Games	Birmingham, United Kingdom	25th (h)	200 m	21.32	+0.2	
2024	2024 African Championships in Athletics	Douala, Cameroon	4th (F)	200 m	20.67	+0.1	
2024	2024 African Championships in Athletics	Douala, Cameroon	1st	4 × 100 m	38.63		
2024	2024 Summer Olympics	Paris, France	16th (SF)	100 m	10.05	+0.5	
2024	2024 Summer Olympics	Paris, France	DQ	4 × 100 m	—N/a		
2025	World Athletics Championships	Tokyo, Japan	12th (SF)	100 m	10.08	+0.3	
