= Edwin Gadayi =

Ghanaian sprinter (born 2001)

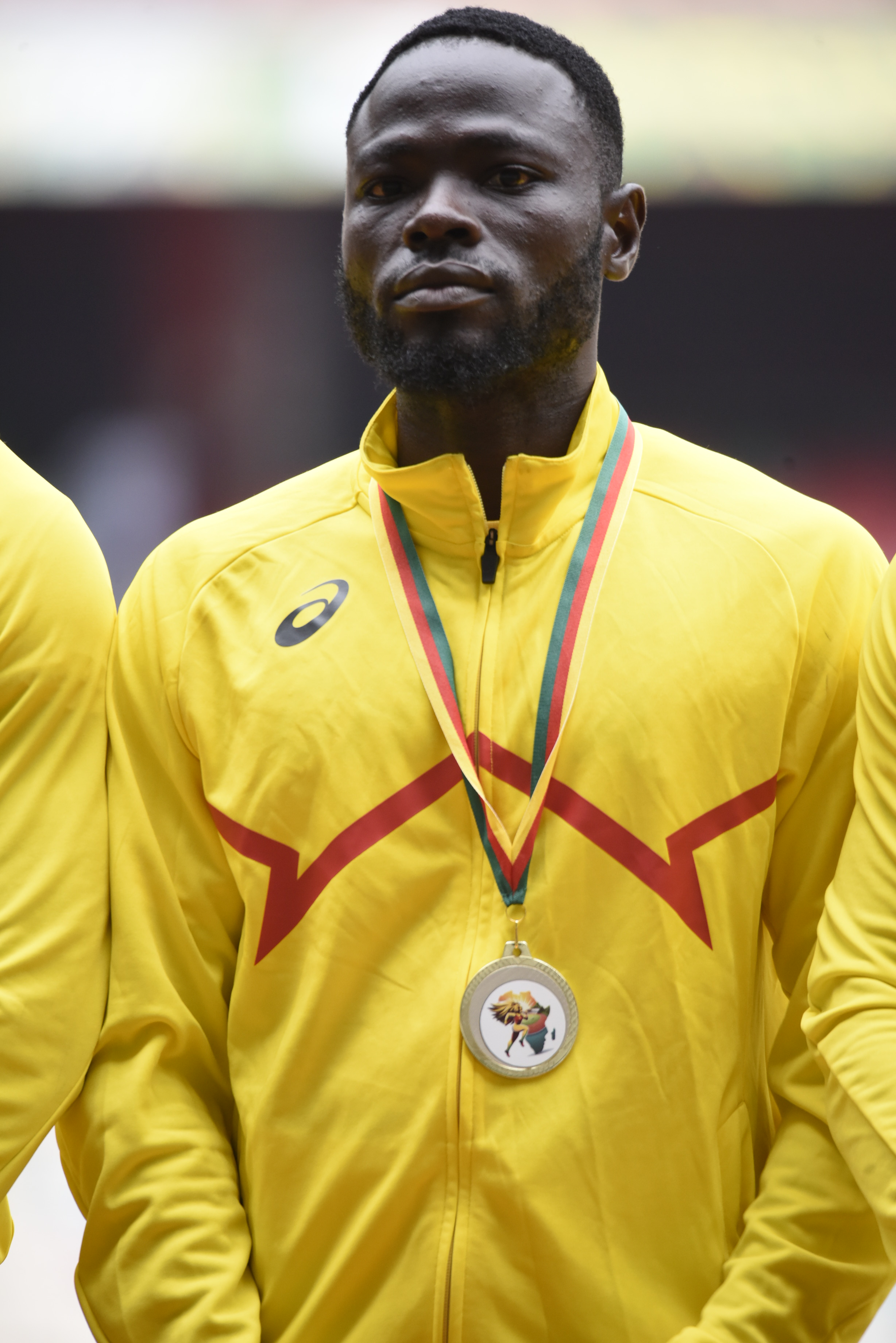

Personal information
- Nationality: Ghanaian
- Born: Edwin Kwabla Gadayi; 14 February 2001 (age 25) Ashanti Region

Sport
- Country: Ghana
- Sport: Athletics
- Events: 100 m, 200 m
Medal record
Representing Ghana
Men's athletics
African Games
Silver medal – second place	2023 Accra	4×100 m relay
African Championships
Gold medal – first place	2024 Douala	4×100 m relay
Bronze medal – third place	2026 Accra	4×100 m relay

Edwin Kwabla Gadayi (14 February 2001) is a Ghanaian sprinter. In April 2021, he was named in the five-member men's team who took part in the World Athletics Relays in Silesia, Poland. He took part in the semi-finals of the 200m at the African Games in Morocco where he was 4th (20.92s). In July 2022, he set a national record in the 200 meters at the 2023 Invitational Championship held in Cape Coast at a time of 20.848 seconds.

== Early life and education ==
Gadayi is based in the Ashanti Region of Ghana. He is a student of University of Cape Coast.

== Honors ==
He won the bronze medal at the African U20 Championships.

He also emerged as the winner in the Ghana Athletics Association's Open Championship event held at the Paa Joe Park in KNUST.

== Achievements ==
Year	Competition	Position	Event	Time	Wind (m/s)	Venue	Notes
2019	African Games	4th	4 × 100 m relay	20.92		Rabat, Morocco	
2022	LOC 2023 Invitational Championship	1st	200m	20.848		Cape Coast	
2022	Ghana Athletics Association's Open Championship	1st	100m	10.626		KNUST Paa Joe Park	
