= Bradley Nkoana =

South African athlete (born 2005)

Bradley Nkoana OLY
Personal information
- Nationality: South African
- Born: Bradley Botshelo Nkoana; 27 January 2005 (age 21)

Sport
- Sport: Athletics
- Event: Sprint

Achievements and titles
- Personal bests: 60m: 6.64 (Potchefstroom, 2024); 100m: 9.95 (Nivelles, 2026); 200m: 20.21 (Geneva, 2025)
Medal record
Men's athletics
Representing South Africa
Olympic Games
Silver medal – second place	2024 Paris	4×100 m relay
World Relays
Gold medal – first place	2025 Guangzhou	4 × 100 m relay
Silver medal – second place	2026 Gaborone	4×100 m relay
African Championships
Silver medal – second place	2026 Accra	100 m
World U20 Championships
Bronze medal – third place	2024 Lima	100m

Bradley Botshelo Nkoana OLY (born 27 January 2005) is a South African sprinter. He won silver at the 2024 Paris Olympics as part of South Africa's 4 x 100 metres relay team.

== Early life ==
He attended Potchefstroom High School for Boys whereafter he went on to University of Pretoria.

== Career ==
He ran in March 2020 at the Gauteng North junior Championships but then missed 18 months of action due to the COVID-19 pandemic and then a hamstring injury and a fractured heel.

In April 2022, Nkoana won a silver medal in the men's senior 100m at the ASA Senior Track & Field National Championships at the age of 17 years-old. In July 2022, he ran a personal best of 10.20 seconds for the 100 metres in Mannheim. In 2022, he was nominated for South African Junior Athlete of the Year.

He finished third at the South African Athletics Championships over 100 metres in April 2024, running a time of 10.29 seconds. He ran as part of the South African 4 × 100 m relay team which qualified for the 2024 Paris Olympics at the 2024 World Relays Championships in Nassau, Bahamas. In June 2024, he was selected for the South African team for the 2024 Paris Olympics.

On 9 August 2024, Nkoana won an Olympic silver medal as part of South Africa's 4 x 100 metres relay team at the Paris Olympics while still only 19 years old. He won the bronze medal in the 100 metres at the 2024 World Athletics U20 Championships in Lima, Peru in August 2024.

He competed at the 2025 World Athletics Relays in China in the Men's 4 × 100 metres relay in May 2025 and helped South Africa win the event. He was runner-up over 100 metres in Stockholm at the 2025 BAUHAUS-galan event in June 2025. On 21 June 2025, he ran his personal best over 200m of 20.21 seconds at the Centre sportif Bout-du-Monde, Geneve, Switzerland.

In September 2025, he competed in the men's 4 x 100 metres at the 2025 World Championships in Tokyo, Japan.

Competing on the opening day at the 2026 World Athletics Relays on 2 May, he was part of the South African men's 4 x 100 metres team which won their heat in 37.68 seconds. The following day, he ran as the team won the silver medal and set a new South African national and African record 37.49 to move to sixth on the world all-time list. Later that month, he competed at the 2026 African Championships in Accra, Ghana, winning the silver medal in the men's 100 m final. He competed in the 100 metres at the 2026 Commonwealth Games in Glasgow, Scotland, reaching the semi-finals. He also ran in the men's 4 × 100 m relay.

== Personal life ==
He attends North-West University.
