= Athletics at the 2023 African Games – Men's 5000 metres =

Men's 5000 metres at the 2023 African Games
- Venue: Legon Sports Stadium
- Location: Accra, Ghana
- Dates: 22 March
- Competitors: 17 from 11 nations
- Winning time: 13:38.12

Medalists
gold medal	Hagos Gebrhiwet	Ethiopia
silver medal	Abdullahi Jama Mohamed	Somalia
bronze medal	Cornelius Kemboi	Kenya

The men's 5000 metres event at the 2023 African Games was held on 22 March 2024 in Accra, Ghana.

== Results ==
Rank	Name	Nationality	Time	Notes
1st place, gold medalist(s)	Hagos Gebrhiwet	Ethiopia	13:38.12	
2nd place, silver medalist(s)	Abdullahi Jama Mohamed	Somalia	13:38.64	
3rd place, bronze medalist(s)	Cornelius Kemboi	Kenya	13:40.61	
4	Kuma Girma	Ethiopia	13:43.58	
5	Getnet Wale	Ethiopia	13:44.45	
6	Célestin Ndikumana	Burundi	13:45.34	
7	Precious Mashele	South Africa	13:46.19	
8	Simon Koech	Kenya	13:49.35	
9	Seare Dawit	Eritrea	13:52.53	
10	Evans Kiptum	Kenya	13:53.28	
11	Fikadu Ghebremeskel	Eritrea	13:55.41	
12	Wellington Varevi	Zimbabwe	13:57.54	
13	Emilie Hafashimana	Burundi	14:10.03	
14	Sougueh Aden Houssein	Djibouti	14:25.49	
15	António Teko	Angola	14:54.61	
16	Echen Obega	The Gambia	14:57.71	
17	Abubakarr Conteh	Sierra Leone	14:57.80	
	Mohamed Ismail Ibrahim	Djibouti	DNS	
	Peter Qambaway	Tanzania	DNS	
	Merhawi Mebrahtu	Eritrea	DNS	
	Abraham Guem	South Sudan	DNS	
