= Chess at the 2023 African Games =

- Venue: Alisa Hotel
- Location: Accra, Ghana
- Dates: 9–11 March 2024

Chess at the 2023 African Games was held from 9 to 11 March 2024 in Accra, Ghana.

== Participating nations ==
- Algeria
- Angola
- Botswana
- Egypt
- Equatorial Guinea
- Ghana
- Ivory Coast
- Kenya
- Madagascar
- Mozambique
- Nigeria
- South Africa
- São Tomé and Príncipe
- Uganda
- Zambia
- Zimbabwe

== Medal table ==
Rank	Nation	Gold	Silver	Bronze	Total
1	Egypt (EGY)	5	1	0	6
2	Algeria (ALG)	1	2	2	5
3	Madagascar (MAD)	0	1	1	2
4	Angola (ANG)	0	1	0	1
4	Mozambique (MOZ)	0	1	0	1
6	Nigeria (NGR)	0	0	2	2
7	South Africa (RSA)	0	0	1	1
Totals (7 entries)		6	6	6	18

== Medal summary ==
Event	Gold	Silver	Bronze
Rapid Men Individual	Bassem Amin; Egypt	Donaldo Mulatinho; Mozambique	Adlane Arab; Algeria
Rapid Women Individual	Shahenda Wafa; Egypt	Ednasia Júnior; Angola	Lina Nassr; Algeria
Rapid Mixed Team	Egypt; Bassem Amin; Shahenda Wafa	Algeria; Adlane Arab; Lina Nassr	Madagascar; Fy Antenaina Rakotomaharo; Aina Mahasambatra Tsinjoviniavo
Blitz Men Individual	Bassem Amin; Egypt	Fy Antenaina Rakotomaharo; Madagascar	Banele Mhango; South Africa
Blitz Women Individual	Lina Nassr; Algeria	Shahenda Wafa; Egypt	Peace Samson; Nigeria
Blitz Mixed Team	Egypt; Bassem Amin; Shahenda Wafa	Algeria	Nigeria
