= Egypt at the 2023 African Games =

- Flag of Egypt
- IOC code: EGY
- NOC: Egyptian Olympic Committee

in Accra, Ghana 8 March 2024 – 23 March 2024
- Competitors: 233 in 21 sports
- Medals Ranked 1st: Gold 103 Silver 47 Bronze 43 Total 193

African Games appearances (overview)
- 1965; 1973; 1978; 1987; 1991; 1995; 1999; 2003; 2007; 2011; 2015; 2019; 2023

Egypt competed at the 2023 African Games held from 8 to 23 March 2024 in Accra, Ghana. Egypt competed in 21 sports.

== Medal table ==
| Medal | Name | Sport | Event | Date |
|---|---|---|---|---|
| Gold | Omar Assar | Table tennis | Men's singles | 5 March |
| Gold | Hana Goda | Table tennis | Women's singles | 5 March |
| Gold | Abdelrahman Abdelsalam; Mostafa Elghobashy; Zeyad Mohamed | Karate | Men's kata team | 7 March |
| Gold | Abdalla Abdelaziz | Karate | Men's kumite −75 kg | 7 March |
| Gold | Youssef Badawy | Karate | Men's kumite −84 kg | 7 March |
| Gold | Noursin Aly | Karate | Women's kumite −61 kg | 7 March |
| Gold | Menna Shaaban Okila | Karate | Women's kumite +68 kg | 7 March |
| Gold | Karim Waleed Ghaly | Karate | Men's kata individual | 8 March |
| Gold | Yasmin Nasr Elgewily | Karate | Women's kumite −50 kg | 8 March |
| Gold | Aya Hesham; Asmaa Allam; Noha Amr Antar | Karate | Women's kata team | 8 March |
| Gold | Youssef Abdelaziz; Omar Assar; Mohamed El-Beiali; Khalid Assar; Mohamed Shouman | Table tennis | Men's team | 8 March |
| Gold | Mariam Alhodaby; Dina Meshref; Hana Goda; Yousra Helmy; Marwa Alhodaby | Table tennis | Women's team | 8 March |
| Gold | Shahenda Wafa; Bassem Amin | Chess | Mixed rapid team | 9 March |
| Gold | Youssef Badawy; Taha Tarek Mahmoud; Moamen Sabry; Abdalla Abdelgawad; Abdalla Abdelaziz; Mohamed Salama | Karate | Men's kumite team | 9 March |
| Gold | Noursin Aly; Menna Shaaban Okila; Ahlam Youssef; Habiba Hekal | Karate | Women's kumite team | 9 March |
| Gold | Abdalla Nasr | Swimming | Men's 200 metre butterfly | 9 March |
| Gold | Marwan Elkamash | Swimming | Men's 800 metre freestyle | 9 March |
| Gold | Nour Elgendy | Swimming | Women's 200 metre butterfly | 9 March |
| Gold | Youssef Abdelaziz; Mariam Alhodaby | Table tennis | Mixed doubles | 9 March |
| Gold | Moamen Mohamed | Wrestling | Men's Greco-Roman 60 kg | 9 March |
| Gold | Mohamed Ibrahim El-Sayed | Wrestling | Men's Greco-Roman 67 kg | 9 March |
| Gold | Mohamed Gabr | Wrestling | Men's Greco-Roman 97 kg | 9 March |
| Gold | Abdellatif Mohamed | Wrestling | Men's Greco-Roman 130 kg | 9 March |
| Gold | Bassem Amin | Chess | Men's rapid individual | 10 March |
| Gold | Shahenda Wafa | Chess | Women's rapid individual | 10 March |
| Gold | Marwan Elkamash | Swimming | Men's 200 metre freestyle | 10 March |
| Gold | Ali Khalafalla | Swimming | Men's 50 metre butterfly | 10 March |
| Gold | Lojine Hamed | Swimming | Women's 200 metre freestyle | 10 March |
| Gold | Farida Osman | Swimming | Women's 50 metre butterfly | 10 March |
| Gold | Mariam Alhodaby; Marwa Alhodaby | Table tennis | Women's doubles | 10 March |
| Gold | Attia Elaraby | Weightlifting | Men's 61 kg snatch | 10 March |
| Gold | Attia Elaraby | Weightlifting | Men's 61 kg clean & jerk | 10 March |
| Gold | Attia Elaraby | Weightlifting | Men's 61 kg total | 10 March |
| Gold | Basma Ramadan | Weightlifting | Women's 45 kg snatch | 10 March |
| Gold | Basma Ramadan | Weightlifting | Women's 45 kg clean & jerk | 10 March |
| Gold | Basma Ramadan | Weightlifting | Women's 45 kg total | 10 March |
| Gold | Bassem Amin | Chess | Men's blitz individual | 11 March |
| Gold | Bassem Amin; Shahenda Wafa | Chess | Mixed blitz team | 11 March |
| Gold | Marwan Elkamash | Swimming | Men's 400 metre freestyle | 11 March |
| Gold | Karim Mahmoud; Abdalla Nasr; Ibrahim Shamseldin; Marwan Elkamash | Swimming | Men's 4 × 200 metre freestyle relay | 11 March |
| Gold | Farida Osman | Swimming | Women's 100 metre butterfly | 11 March |
| Gold | Gamal Mohamed | Wrestling | Men's freestyle 57 kg | 11 March |
| Gold | Omar Mourad | Wrestling | Men's freestyle 65 kg | 11 March |
| Gold | Amr Reda Hussen | Wrestling | Men's freestyle 74 kg | 11 March |
| Gold | Ahmed Mahmoud | Wrestling | Men's freestyle 86 kg | 11 March |
| Gold | Mostafa Eldars | Wrestling | Men's freestyle 97 kg | 11 March |
| Gold | Mostafa Eldars | Wrestling | Men's freestyle 125 kg | 11 March |
| Gold | Abdalla Nasr | Swimming | Men's 100 metre butterfly | 12 March |
| Gold | Sara El Sammany | Swimming | Women's 100 metre backstroke | 12 March |
| Gold | Farida Osman; Lojine Hamed; Nadine Abdallah; Nour Elgendy | Swimming | Women's 4 × 100 metre freestyle relay | 12 March |
| Gold | Eslam Abouelwafa | Weightlifting | Men's 89 kg total | 12 March |
| Gold | Eslam Abouelwafa | Weightlifting | Men's 89 kg snatch | 12 March |
| Gold | Eslam Abouelwafa | Weightlifting | Men's 89 kg clean & jerk | 12 March |
| Gold | Abdelrahman Mohamed | Judo | Men's −81 kg | 13 March |
| Gold | Marwan Elkamash | Swimming | Men's 1500 metre freestyle | 13 March |
| Gold | Ali Khalafalla | Swimming | Men's 50 metre freestyle | 13 March |
| Gold | Farida Osman | Swimming | Women's 50 metre freestyle | 13 March |
| Gold | Karim Abokahla | Weightlifting | Men's 96 kg total | 13 March |
| Gold | Karim Abokahla | Weightlifting | Men's 96 kg snatch | 13 March |
| Gold | Karim Abokahla | Weightlifting | Men's 96 kg clean & jerk | 13 March |
| Gold | Ahmed Ali | Weightlifting | Men's 102 kg total | 13 March |
| Gold | Ahmed Ali | Weightlifting | Men's 102 kg snatch | 13 March |
| Gold | Ahmed Ali | Weightlifting | Men's 102 kg clean & jerk | 13 March |
| Gold | Sara Ahmed | Weightlifting | Women's 81 kg total | 13 March |
| Gold | Sara Ahmed | Weightlifting | Women's 81 kg snatch | 13 March |
| Gold | Sara Ahmed | Weightlifting | Women's 81 kg clean & jerk | 13 March |
| Gold | Doaa Tawfik; Marwa Magdy | Beach volleyball | Women's tournament | 14 March |
| Gold | Ragab Abdelhay | Weightlifting | Men's 109 kg snatch | 14 March |
| Gold | Abdelrahman El-Sayed | Weightlifting | Men's +109 kg total | 14 March |
| Gold | Abdelrahman El-Sayed | Weightlifting | Men's +109 kg snatch | 14 March |
| Gold | Abdelrahman El-Sayed | Weightlifting | Men's +109 kg clean & jerk | 14 March |
| Gold | Fatma Sadek | Weightlifting | Women's 87 kg total | 14 March |
| Gold | Fatma Sadek | Weightlifting | Women's 87 kg snatch | 14 March |
| Gold | Shaimaa Khalaf | Weightlifting | Women's +87 kg total | 14 March |
| Gold | Shaimaa Khalaf | Weightlifting | Women's +87 kg snatch | 14 March |
| Gold | Shaimaa Khalaf | Weightlifting | Women's +87 kg clean & jerk | 14 March |
| Gold | Omar Ibrahim | Arm wrestling | Men's left arm 55 kg | 15 March |
| Gold | Mohamed Elmeligy | Arm wrestling | Men's left arm 60 kg | 15 March |
| Gold | Ali Kassem | Arm wrestling | Men's left arm 65 kg | 15 March |
| Gold | Mohamed Hassanin | Arm wrestling | Men's left arm 85 kg | 15 March |
| Gold | Mohamed Abdelrahman | Arm wrestling | Men's left arm 100 kg | 15 March |
| Gold | Mostafa Ibrahim | Arm wrestling | Men's left arm +100 kg | 15 March |
| Gold | Fatma Rezk | Arm wrestling | Women's left arm +80 kg | 15 March |
| Gold | Omar Ibrahim | Arm wrestling | Men's right arm 55 kg | 16 March |
| Gold | Mohamed Elmeligy | Arm wrestling | Men's right arm 60 kg | 16 March |
| Gold | Ali Kassem | Arm wrestling | Men's right arm 65 kg | 16 March |
| Gold | Andria Jeha | Arm wrestling | Men's right arm 75 kg | 16 March |
| Gold | Mostafa Mohamed | Arm wrestling | Men's right arm 85 kg | 16 March |
| Gold | Mohamed Abdelrahman | Arm wrestling | Men's right arm 100 kg | 16 March |
| Gold | Mohamed Hassanin | Arm wrestling | Men's right arm +100 kg | 16 March |
| Gold | Moatazbellah Assem | Taekwondo | Men's −54 kg | 17 March |
| Gold | Ahmad Saied | Taekwondo | Men's −87 kg | 19 March |
| Gold | Mostafa El Gamel | Athletics | Men's hammer throw | 21 March |
| Gold | Merna Refaat; Sandra Samir | Tennis | Women's doubles | 21 March |
| Gold | Habiba Elgizawy | 3x3 basketball | Shoot out contest | 22 March |
| Gold | Egypt | Handball | Men's tournament | 22 March |
| Gold | Egypt | Field hockey | Men's tournament | 22 March |
| Gold | Ahmed Aboushady | Taekwondo | Men's over 17 | 22 March |
| Gold | Seifeldin Basha; Ahmed Badr | Taekwondo | Men's under 30 team | 22 March |
| Gold | Ganatalla Hamed | Taekwondo | Women's over 17 | 22 March |
| Gold | Merna Refaat; Sandra Samir | Tennis | Women's team | 23 March |
| Gold | Egypt | Volleyball | Men's tournament | 23 March |
| Gold | Egypt | Volleyball | Women's tournament | 23 March |
| Silver | Dina Meshref | Table tennis | Women's singles | 5 March |
| Silver | Taha Tarek Mahmoud | Karate | Men's kumite +84 kg | 7 March |
| Silver | Ahlam Youssef | Karate | Women's kumite −55 kg | 8 March |
| Silver | Farida Osman | Swimming | Women's 100 metre freestyle | 9 March |
| Silver | Lojine Hamed | Swimming | Women's 1500 metre freestyle | 9 March |
| Silver | Abdalla Nasr; Ali Ahmed; Ayman Adel; Nadine Abdallah; Karim Mahmoud; Ganat Soliman; Hla Naanoush; Mohamed Derbala | Swimming | Mixed 4 × 100 metre freestyle relay | 9 March |
| Silver | Mahmoud Abdelrahman | Wrestling | Men's Greco-Roman 77 kg | 9 March |
| Silver | Mohamed Metwally | Wrestling | Men's Greco-Roman 87 kg | 9 March |
| Silver | Doha Hany; Adham Hatem Elgamal | Badminton | Mixed doubles | 10 March |
| Silver | Abdalla Nasr | Swimming | Men's 200 metre freestyle | 10 March |
| Silver | Atia El Rahman; Farida Osman; Nadine Abdallah; Youssef El-Kamash; Karim Mahmoud; Jasmine Eissa; Ahmed Aly; Nour Elgendy | Swimming | Mixed 4 × 100 metre medley relay | 10 March |
| Silver | Khalid Assar; Mohamed Shouman | Table tennis | Men's doubles | 10 March |
| Silver | Nada Mohamed | Wrestling | Women's freestyle 50 kg | 10 March |
| Silver | Gharam Askar | Wrestling | Women's freestyle 62 kg | 10 March |
| Silver | Shahenda Wafa | Chess | Women's blitz individual | 11 March |
| Silver | Nour Elgendy | Swimming | Women's 100 metre butterfly | 11 March |
| Silver | Lojine Hamed | Swimming | Women's 400 metre freestyle | 11 March |
| Silver | Lojine Hamed; Nadine Abdallah; Nour Elgendy; Rawan El-Damaty | Swimming | Women's 4 × 200 metre freestyle relay | 11 March |
| Silver | Noura Essam | Weightlifting | Women's 55 kg snatch | 11 March |
| Silver | Abdalla Nasr; Ibrahim Shamseldin; Marwan Elkamash; Mohamed Derbala; Atia Abd El Rahman | Swimming | Men's 4 × 100 metre freestyle relay | 12 March |
| Silver | Youssef El-Kamash | Swimming | Men's 50 metre breaststroke | 12 March |
| Silver | Omar Mahmoud | Judo | Men's −81 kg | 13 March |
| Silver | Ahmed Ali | Swimming | Men's 1500 metre freestyle | 13 March |
| Silver | Mohamed Derbala; Ibrahim Shamseldin; Abdalla Nasr; Marwan Elkamash | Swimming | Men's 4 × 100 metre medley relay | 13 March |
| Silver | Nour Elgendy | Swimming | Women's 200 metre medley | 13 March |
| Silver | Farida Osman; Nadine Abdallah; Nour Elgendy; Sara El Sammany | Swimming | Women's 4 × 100 metre medley relay | 13 March |
| Silver | Lojine Hamed | Swimming | Women's 800 metre freestyle | 13 March |
| Silver | Amira Elkady | Weightlifting | Women's 76 kg snatch | 13 March |
| Silver | Fatma Sadek | Weightlifting | Women's 87 kg clean & jerk | 14 March |
| Silver | Ragab Abdelhay | Weightlifting | Women's 87 kg total | 14 March |
| Silver | Ragab Abdelhay | Weightlifting | Women's 87 kg clean & jerk | 14 March |
| Silver | Andria Jeha | Arm wrestling | Men's left arm 75 kg | 15 March |
| Silver | Mostafa Ibrahim | Arm wrestling | Men's left arm 85 kg | 15 March |
| Silver | Mohamed Hassanin | Arm wrestling | Men's right arm 85 kg | 16 March |
| Silver | Fatma Rezk | Arm wrestling | Women's right arm +80 kg | 16 March |
| Silver | Abdallah Essam | Taekwondo | Men's +87 kg | 18 March |
| Silver | Mostafa Amr Hassan | Athletics | Men's shot put | 19 March |
| Silver | Rami Hussein | Taekwondo | Men's −74 kg | 19 March |
| Silver | Janna Mohamed | Taekwondo | Women's −49 kg | 19 March |
| Silver | Aya Mohamed | Taekwondo | Women's −67 kg | 19 March |
| Silver | Seif Hussein | Taekwondo | Men's −80 kg | 20 March |
| Silver | Ahmad Rawy; Aya Shehata; Janna Khattab; Moatazbellah Assem; Nadine Amr; Rami Eissa | Taekwondo | Mixed team kyorugi | 21 March |
| Silver | Lamis Alhussein Abdel Aziz | Tennis | Women's singles | 21 March |
| Silver | Omar Elsayed | Boxing | Men's −71 kg | 22 March |
| Silver | Rahma Ibrahim | Boxing | Women's −60 kg | 22 March |
| Silver | Malak Mohamed; Shahd Mohamed | Taekwondo | Women's under 30 team | 22 March |
| Silver | Michael Bassem; Amr Elsayed; Magdi Mohammed; Mohamed Akram; Kareem Mohamed; Karim-Mohamed Maamoun; Mohamed Fares; Mohamed Safwat | Tennis | Men's team | 23 March |
| Bronze | Mohamed El-Beiali | Table tennis | Men's singles | 5 March |
| Bronze | Aya Hesham | Karate | Women's kata individual | 7 March |
| Bronze | Mohamed Salama | Karate | Men's kumite −60 kg | 8 March |
| Bronze | Moamen Sabry | Karate | Men's kumite −67 kg | 8 March |
| Bronze | Abdalla Nasr | Swimming | Men's 100 metre freestyle | 9 March |
| Bronze | Ali Ahmed | Swimming | Men's 800 metre freestyle | 9 March |
| Bronze | Jasmine Eissa | Swimming | Women's 200 metre butterfly | 9 March |
| Bronze | Mohamed El-Beiali; Marwa Alhodaby | Table tennis | Mixed doubles | 9 March |
| Bronze | Adham Hatem Elgamal | Badminton | Men's singles | 10 March |
| Bronze | Adham Hatem Elgamal; Ahmed Salah | Badminton | Men's doubles | 10 March |
| Bronze | Nour Ahmed Youssri; Doha Hany | Badminton | Women's doubles | 10 March |
| Bronze | Youssef Abdelaziz; Mohamed El-Beiali | Table tennis | Men's doubles | 10 March |
| Bronze | Shaimaa Mohamed | Wrestling | Women's freestyle 53 kg | 10 March |
| Bronze | Louji Yassin | Wrestling | Women's freestyle 57 kg | 10 March |
| Bronze | Samah Abdellatif | Wrestling | Women's freestyle 68 kg | 10 March |
| Bronze | Samar Amer | Wrestling | Women's freestyle 76 kg | 10 March |
| Bronze | Noura Essam | Weightlifting | Women's 55 kg total | 11 March |
| Bronze | Noura Essam | Weightlifting | Women's 55 kg clean & jerk | 11 March |
| Bronze | Adel Hamada | Judo | Men's −60 kg | 12 March |
| Bronze | Nadine Abdallah | Swimming | Women's 50 metre breaststroke | 12 March |
| Bronze | Farida Magdy | Judo | Women's −70 kg | 13 March |
| Bronze | Amira Elkady | Weightlifting | Women's 76 kg total | 13 March |
| Bronze | Amira Elkady | Weightlifting | Women's 76 kg clean & jerk | 13 March |
| Bronze | Ali Hazem | Judo | Men's −90 kg | 14 March |
| Bronze | Karim Ibrahim | Judo | Men's −100 kg | 14 March |
| Bronze | Mohamed Aborakia | Judo | Men's +100 kg | 14 March |
| Bronze | Aya Gaballa | Judo | Women's −78 kg | 14 March |
| Bronze | A Hamada; K Elhagar; A Hazem; Z Ayman; M Aborakia; H Hussein / T Roshdy; H Altaeb; F Ghanem; F Magdy; S Soliman; F Sharaf | Judo | Mixed teams | 15 March |
| Bronze | Fayza Abdrabou | Arm wrestling | Women's right arm 70 kg | 16 March |
| Bronze | Toka Shaaban | Taekwondo | Women's +73 kg | 17 March |
| Bronze | Ahmed Wael | Taekwondo | Men's −68 kg | 18 March |
| Bronze | Yousuf Badawy Sayed | Athletics | Men's 110 metres hurdles | 19 March |
| Bronze | Mohamed Magdi Hamza | Athletics | Men's shot put | 19 March |
| Bronze | Nadine Mahmoud | Taekwondo | Women's −62 kg | 20 March |
| Bronze | Fares Zakaria; Mohamed Safwat | Tennis | Men's doubles | 21 March |
| Bronze | Mohamed Safwat | Tennis | Men's singles | 21 March |
| Bronze | Mayar Sherif; Lamis Alhussein Abdel Aziz | Tennis | Women's doubles | 21 March |
| Bronze | Mayar Sherif | Tennis | Women's singles | 21 March |
| Bronze | Sandra Samir | Tennis | Women's singles | 21 March |
| Bronze | Mustafa Abdel Khaliq | Athletics | Men's javelin throw | 22 March |
| Bronze | Ali Elsalamony | Boxing | Men's −92 kg | 22 March |
| Bronze | Yomna Ayyad | Boxing | Women's −54 kg | 22 March |
| Bronze | Salma Dabbur | Taekwondo | Women's under 30 | 22 March |

== Field Hockey ==
Summary

Key:

- FT – After full-time.
- P – Match decided by penalty-shootout.

| Team | Event | Group stage | | | | Final / BM | |
| Team | Event | Opposition Score | Opposition Score | Opposition Score | Rank | Opposition Score | Rank |
|---|---|---|---|---|---|---|---|
| Egypt men's | Men's tournament | Kenya; W 3–2 | Nigeria; W 5–4 | Ghana; W 1–0 | 1 | Ghana; W 2–2 (3–1 s.o.) | 1 |

=== Men's ===
Group play

| Pos | Team | Pld | W | D | L | GF | GA | GD | Pts | Qualification |
|---|---|---|---|---|---|---|---|---|---|---|
| 1 | Egypt | 3 | 3 | 0 | 0 | 9 | 6 | +3 | 9 | Final |
| 2 | Ghana (H) | 3 | 2 | 0 | 1 | 4 | 2 | +2 | 6 | Final |
| 3 | Nigeria | 3 | 1 | 0 | 2 | 6 | 7 | −1 | 3 | Third place match |
| 4 | Kenya | 3 | 0 | 0 | 3 | 4 | 8 | −4 | 0 | Third place match |

Source: FIH
Rules for classification: 1) points; 2) matches won; 3) goal difference; 4) goals for; 5) head-to-head result; 6) field goals scored.
(H) Hosts

17 March 2024
16:00

| Kenya | 2–3 | Egypt |
|---|---|---|
| Wakhura 23'; Ademba 59' | Report | Adel 17'; Ragab 41'; El-Ganaini 47' |

Umpires:
Nortey Ebenezer (GHA)
Simon Awasa (NGR)

18 March 2024
10:00

| Egypt | 5–4 | Nigeria |
|---|---|---|
| El-Ganaini 17', 36'; Ragab 29'; Sayed 32'; Mamdouh 51' | Report | Samaila 21', 30'; Victor 32', 49' |

Umpires:
Deepak Joshi (IND)
Nortey Ebenezer (GHA)

20 March 2024
16:00

| Ghana | 0–1 | Egypt |
|---|---|---|
| | Report | El-Ganaini 41' |

Umpires:
Simon Awasa (NGR)
Deepak Joshi (IND)
