= Tennis at the 2023 African Games =

- Venue: Borteyman Sports Complex
- Location: Accra, Ghana
- Dates: 15–23 March 2024

Tennis at the 2023 African Games is held from 15 to 23 March 2024 at the Borteyman Sports Complex in Accra, Ghana.

The event served as a qualifier for the 2024 Summer Olympics in Paris, France.

== Participating nations ==
- Algeria
- Benin
- Botswana
- Burkina Faso
- Burundi
- Democratic Republic of the Congo
- Egypt
- Ethiopia
- Gabon
- Ghana
- Ivory Coast
- Kenya
- Libya
- Madagascar
- Mauritania
- Morocco
- Mozambique
- Nigeria
- South Africa (7)
- Togo
- Tunisia
- Uganda
- Zambia
- Zimbabwe

== Results ==
=== Men's events ===
Event	Gold	Silver	Bronze
Singles	Moez Echargui; Tunisia	Benjamin Lock; Zimbabwe	Mohamed Safwat; Egypt
Singles	Moez Echargui; Tunisia	Benjamin Lock; Zimbabwe	Aziz Dougaz; Tunisia
Doubles	Tunisia; Aziz Dougaz; Skander Mansouri	Zimbabwe; Benjamin Lock; Courtney John Lock	Tunisia; Moez Echargui; Aziz Ouakaa
Doubles	Tunisia; Aziz Dougaz; Skander Mansouri	Zimbabwe; Benjamin Lock; Courtney John Lock	Egypt; Fares Zakaria; Mohamed Safwat
Team	Tunisia	Egypt	Ivory Coast

=== Women's events ===
Event	Gold	Silver	Bronze
Singles	Angella Okutoyi; Kenya	Lamis Alhussein Abdel Aziz; Egypt	Mayar Sherif; Egypt
Singles	Angella Okutoyi; Kenya	Lamis Alhussein Abdel Aziz; Egypt	Sandra Samir; Egypt
Doubles	Egypt; Merna Refaat; Sandra Samir	Kenya; Angella Okutoyi; Cynthia Cheruto	Nigeria; Divine Dasam Nweke; Oyinlomo Quadre
Doubles	Egypt; Merna Refaat; Sandra Samir	Kenya; Angella Okutoyi; Cynthia Cheruto	Egypt; Lamis Alhussein Abdel Aziz; Mayar Sherif
Team	Egypt	Nigeria	Morocco

== Medal table ==
* Host nation (Ghana)

Rank	Nation	Gold	Silver	Bronze	Total
1	Tunisia	3	0	2	5
2	Egypt	2	2	5	9
3	Kenya	1	1	0	2
4	Zimbabwe	0	2	0	2
5	Nigeria	0	1	1	2
6	Ivory Coast	0	0	1	1
6	Morocco	0	0	1	1
Totals (7 entries)		6	6	10	22
