= Volleyball at the 2023 African Games =

- Venue: Borteyman Sports Complex
- Location: Accra, Ghana
- Dates: 12–23 March 2024

Volleyball at the 2023 African Games were held from 12 to 23 March 2024 at the Borteyman Sports Complex in Accra, Ghana. Beach volleyball was held from 9 to 14 March and indoor volleyball was held from 9 to 23 March.

== Participating nations ==
- Algeria
- Seychelles
- Democratic Republic of the Congo
- Tunisia
- Egypt
- Ghana
- Kenya
- The Gambia
- Morocco
- Cameroon
- Burkina Faso
- Nigeria
- Chad

== Results ==
Event	Gold	Silver	Bronze
Men	Egypt	Kenya	Ghana
Women	Egypt	Tunisia	Kenya
