= Athletics at the 2023 African Games =

- Venue: Legon Sports Stadium
- Dates: 18–22 March 2024
- Competitors: 571 from 46 nations

Athletics at the 2023 African Games was held from 18 to 22 March 2024 in Accra, Ghana.

== Medal table ==
* Host nation (Ghana)

Rank	Nation	Gold	Silver	Bronze	Total
1	Nigeria (NGR)	11	6	5	22
2	Ethiopia (ETH)	7	7	4	18
3	South Africa (RSA)	7	1	3	11
4	Kenya (KEN)	6	6	8	20
5	Ghana (GHA)*	3	2	1	6
6	Algeria (ALG)	2	4	4	10
7	The Gambia (GAM)	2	0	0	2
8	Morocco (MAR)	1	2	0	3
8	Zambia (ZAM)	1	2	0	3
10	Cameroon (CMR)	1	1	4	6
11	Egypt (EGY)	1	1	3	5
12	Burkina Faso (BUR)	1	1	2	4
12	Senegal (SEN)	1	1	2	4
14	Benin (BEN)	1	0	0	1
14	Eritrea (ERI)	1	0	0	1
14	South Sudan (SSD)	1	0	0	1
17	Botswana (BOT)	0	3	3	6
18	Liberia (LBR)	0	2	1	3
18	Uganda (UGA)	0	2	1	3
20	Tunisia (TUN)	0	2	0	2
21	Guinea (GUI)	0	1	0	1
21	Madagascar (MAD)	0	1	0	1
21	Mali (MLI)	0	1	0	1
21	Somalia (SOM)	0	1	0	1
25	Namibia (NAM)	0	0	2	2
25	Zimbabwe (ZIM)	0	0	2	2
27	Republic of the Congo (CGO)	0	0	1	1
Totals (27 entries)		47	47	46	140

== Medal summary ==
=== Men ===
Event	Gold		Silver		Bronze	
100 metres	Emmanuel Eseme; Cameroon	10.14	Usheoritse Itsekiri; Nigeria	10.23	Gilbert Hainuca; Namibia	10.29
200 metres	Joseph Amoah; Ghana	20.70	Claude Itoungue Bongogne; Cameroon	20.74	Consider Ekanem; Nigeria	20.80
400 metres	Chidi Okezie; Nigeria	45.06	Muzala Samukonga; Zambia	45.37	Cheikh Tidiane Diouf; Senegal	45.49
800 metres	Aaron Cheminingwa; Kenya	1:45.72	Ngeno Kipngetich; Kenya	1:45.73	Tumo Nkape; Botswana	1:46.04
1500 metres	Brian Komen; Kenya	3:39.19	Ermias Girma; Ethiopia	3:39.40	Abel Kipsang; Kenya	3:39.45
5000 metres	Hagos Gebrhiwet; Ethiopia	13:38.12	Abdullahi Jama Mohamed; Somalia	13:38.64	Cornelius Kemboi; Kenya	13:40.61
10,000 metres	Nibret Melak; Ethiopia	29:45.37	Gemechu Dida; Ethiopia	29:45.68	Evans Kiptum; Kenya	29:47.61
110 metres hurdles	Louis François Mendy; Senegal	13.61	Amine Bouanani; Algeria	13.69	Yousuf Badawy Sayed; Egypt	13.83
400 metres hurdles	Saad Hinti; Morocco	48.82 NR	Victor Ntweng; Botswana	49.38	Kemorena Tisang; Botswana	50.09
3000 metres steeplechase	Samuel Firewu; Ethiopia	8:24.30	Amos Serem; Kenya	8:25.77	Simon Koech; Kenya	8:26.19
4 × 100 metres relay	Nigeria; Israel Okon Sunday; Consider Ekanem; Alaba Akintola; Usheoritse Itsekiri; Edose Ibadin*	38.41	Ghana; Edwin Gadayi; Benjamin Azamati; Solomon Hammond; Joseph Amoah	38.43	Liberia; John Sherman; Emmanuel Matadi; Jabez Reeves; Joseph Fahnbulleh	38.73 NR
4 × 400 metres relay	Zambia; Patrick Nyambe; Kennedy Luchembe; David Mulenga; Muzala Samukonga	2:59.12 GR, NR	Botswana; Busang Kebinatshipi; Leungo Scotch; Boitumelo Masilo; Bayapo Ndori; Omphile Seribe*	2:59.32	Nigeria; Ifeanyi Emmanuel Ojeli; Samson Oghenewegba Nathaniel; Sikiru Adeyemi; Chidi Okezie; Dubem Nwachukwu*	3:01.84
Half marathon	Samsom Amare; Eritrea	1:05:04	William Amponsah; Ghana	1:05:13	Isaac Mpofu; Zimbabwe	1:05:37
20 kilometres walk	Misgana Wakuma; Ethiopia	1:28:05	Samuel Gathimba; Kenya	1:28:06	Ismail Benhammouda; Algeria	1:31:12
High jump	Evans Yamoah; Ghana	2.23 m	Saad Hammouda; Morocco	2.21 m	Mpho Links; South Africa	2.21 m
Pole vault	Mehdi Amar Rouana; Algeria	5.30 m	Boubacar Diallo; Mali	5.00 m	Abera Alemu; Ethiopia	4.00 m
Long jump	Asande Mthembu; South Africa	7.86 m	Yasser Triki; Algeria	7.83 m w	Appolinaire Yinra; Cameroon	7.71 m
Triple jump	Hugues Fabrice Zango; Burkina Faso	16.97 m	Amath Faye; Senegal	16.24 m	Yacouba Loué; Burkina Faso	15.86 m
Shot put	Chukwuebuka Enekwechi; Nigeria	21.06 m	Mostafa Amr Hassan; Egypt	20.70 m	Mohamed Magdi Hamza; Egypt	20.29 m
Discus throw	Victor Hogan; South Africa	62.56 m	Oussama Khennoussi; Algeria	59.97 m	Ryan Williams; Namibia	55.42 m
Hammer throw	Mostafa El Gamel; Egypt	73.65 m	Mohsen Mohamed Anani; Tunisia	67.71 m	Allan Cumming; South Africa	67.57 m
Javelin throw	Nnamdi Chinecherem; Nigeria	82.80 m NR	Julius Yego; Kenya	81.74 m	Mustafa Mahmoud Abdel Khaliq; Egypt	78.10 m
Decathlon	Fredriech Pretorius; South Africa	7550 pts	Edwin Kimutai Too; Kenya	7140 pts	Dhiae Boudoumi; Algeria	6943 pts

* Indicates the athletes only competed in the preliminary heats and received medals.

=== Women ===
Event	Gold		Silver		Bronze	
100 metres	Gina Bass; The Gambia	11.36	Maia McCoy; Liberia	11.49	Olayinka Olajide; Nigeria	11.55
200 metres	Gina Bass; The Gambia	23.13	Olayinka Olajide; Nigeria	23.18	Natacha Ngoye Akamabi; Republic of the Congo	23.42
400 metres	Mary Moraa; Kenya	50.57	Esther Elo Joseph; Nigeria	51.61	Sita Sibiri; Burkina Faso	51.74 NR
800 metres	Tsige Duguma; Ethiopia	1:57.73	Halima Nakaayi; Uganda	1:58.59	Vivian Chebet Kiprotich; Kenya	2:00.27
1500 metres	Hirut Meshesha; Ethiopia	4:05.71 GR	Hawi Abera; Ethiopia	4:06.09	Mary Ekiru; Kenya	4:06.22
5000 metres	Medina Eisa; Ethiopia	15:04.32	Birtukan Molla; Ethiopia	15:05.32	Melknat Wudu; Ethiopia	15:07.04
10,000 metres	Janeth Chepngetich; Kenya	33:37.00	Wede Kefale; Ethiopia	33:38.37	Tekan Berhe; Ethiopia	33:51.50
100 metres hurdles	Tobi Amusan; Nigeria	12.89	Sidonie Fiadanantsoa; Madagascar	13.19	Ashley Kamangirira; Zimbabwe	13.59
400 metres hurdles	Rogail Joseph; South Africa	55.39	Noura Ennadi; Morocco	55.85	Linda Angounou; Cameroon	56.41
3000 metres steeplechase	Beatrice Chepkoech; Kenya	9:15.61 GR	Peruth Chemutai; Uganda	9:16.07	Lomi Muleta; Ethiopia	9:26.63
4 × 100 metres relay	Nigeria; Justina Tiana Eyakpobeyan; Olayinka Olajide; Moforehan Abinusawa; Tobi Amusan; Chisom Onyebuchi*; Blessing Ogundiran*	43.05	Liberia; Ebony Morrison; Destiny Smith-Barnett; Maia McCoy; Shania Collins	44.02	Ghana; Mary Boakye; Janet Mensah; Doris Mensah; Halutie Hor; Benedicta Kwartemaa*	44.21
4 × 400 metres relay	Nigeria; Esther Elo Joseph; Patience Okon George; Brittany Ogunmokun; Omolara Ogunmakinju	3:27.29	Zambia; Niddy Mingilishi; Quincy Malekani; Abygirl Sepiso; Rhoda Njobvu	3:31.85 NR	Botswana; Tlhomphang Basele; Lydia Jele; Obakeng Kamberuka; Oratile Nowe	3:33.44
Half marathon	Atalena Loliha; South Sudan	1:14:36	Zewditu Aderaw; Ethiopia	1:14:40	Nancy Chepleting Meli; Kenya	1:15:07
20 kilometres walk	Emily Wamusyi Ngii; Kenya		Sintayehu Masire; Ethiopia		Souad Azzi; Algeria	
High jump	Rose Amoanimaa Yeboah; Ghana	1.90 m	Fatoumata Balley; Guinea	1.81 m	Darina Hadil Rezik; Algeria	1.78 m
Pole vault	Miré Reinstorf; South Africa	4.35 m GR	Dorra Mahfoudhi; Tunisia	3.70 m	Not awarded as the event had 2 athletes	
Long jump	Ese Brume; Nigeria	6.92 m w	Marthe Koala; Burkina Faso	6.81 m w	Prestina Ochonogor; Nigeria	6.67 m w
Triple jump	Ruth Usoro; Nigeria	13.80 m	Winny Bii; Kenya	13.64 m	Saly Sarr; Senegal	13.60 m
Shot put	Ashley Erasmus; South Africa	16.98 m	Oyesade Olatoye; Nigeria	16.61 m	Ischke Senekal; South Africa	16.38 m
Discus throw	Obiageri Amaechi; Nigeria	58.93 m	Chioma Onyekwere; Nigeria	58.03 m	Nora Monie; Cameroon	56.11 m
Hammer throw	Zahra Tatar; Algeria	69.65 m GR, NR	Zouina Bouzebra; Algeria	68.97 m	Oyesade Olatoye; Nigeria	68.92 m
Javelin throw	Jo-Ané du Plessis; South Africa	60.80 m GR	Jana van Schalkwyk; South Africa	57.64 m	Josephine Joyce Lalam; Uganda	57.01 m NR
Heptathlon	Odile Ahouanwanou; Benin	5616 pts	Kemi Francis-Petersen; Nigeria	5268 pts	Adèle Mafogang; Cameroon	5181 pts

* Indicates the athletes only competed in the preliminary heats and received medals.

=== Mixed ===
Event	Gold		Silver		Bronze	
4 × 400 metres relay	Nigeria; Ifeanyi Emmanuel Ojeli; Patience Okon George; Sikiru Adeyemi; Omolara Ogunmakinju; Samson Oghenewegba Nathaniel*	3:13.26 AR	Botswana; Busang Kebinatshipi; Lydia Jele; Bayapo Ndori; Obakeng Kamberuka; Leungo Scotch*	3:13.99 NR	Kenya; David Sanayek Kapirante; Maureen Thomas; Kennedy Kimeu Muthoki; Mary Moraa	3:18.03

* Indicates the athletes only competed in the preliminary heats and received medals.

== Participating nations ==
- Algeria (19)
- Angola (8)
- Benin (10)
- Burundi (7)
- Botswana (23)
- Burkina Faso (14)
- Central African Republic (2)
- Republic of the Congo (21)
- Ivory Coast (5)
- Cameroon (10)
- Democratic Republic of the Congo (5)
- Djibouti (6)
- Egypt (13)
- Equatorial Guinea (8)
- Eritrea (15)
- Eswatini (2)
- Ethiopia (87)
- Gabon (4)
- The Gambia (9)
- Ghana (36)
- Guinea (3)
- Guinea-Bissau (2)
- Kenya (51)
- Liberia (10)
- Libya (1)
- Lesotho (3)
- Madagascar (4)
- Malawi (2)
- Mali (8)
- Mauritania (2)
- Morocco (16)
- Mozambique (2)
- Namibia (21)
- Nigeria (44)
- Niger (2)
- Rwanda (1)
- São Tomé and Príncipe (2)
- Senegal (11)
- Seychelles (7)
- Sierra Leone (12)
- South Africa (30)
- South Sudan (5)
- Somalia (1)
- Sudan (2)
- Zambia (14)
- Zimbabwe (11)
