= Table tennis at the 2023 African Games – Women's singles =

Women's singles at the 2023 African Games
- Venue: Accra International Conference Centre
- Date: 4 – 5 March 2024
- Competitors: 62 from 20 nations

Medalists
gold medal	Hana Goda	Egypt
silver medal	Dina Meshref	Egypt
bronze medal	Lucie Mobarek	Algeria
bronze medal	Offiong Edem	Nigeria

The women's singles table tennis event at the 2023 African Games took place from 4 to 5 March 2024 at the Accra International Conference Centre.

Dina Meshref was the defending champion, but lost in the final to her compatriot Hana Goda.

== Schedule ==
All times are Greenwich Mean Time (UTC+00:00)

Date	Time	Event
Monday, 4 March 2024	10:00	Round of 64
Monday, 4 March 2024	15:00	Round of 32
Monday, 4 March 2024	18:00	Round of 16
Tuesday, 5 March 2024	10:00	Quarterfinals
Tuesday, 5 March 2024	12:00	Semifinals
Tuesday, 5 March 2024	18:00	Final

== Results ==
=== Finals ===
Quarterfinals
Dina Meshref (EGY)	11	11	11	11
Sarah Hanffou (CMR)	2	7	4	3
Offiong Edem (NGR)	11	7	12	11	11	9	11
Mariam Al-Hodaby (EGY)	8	11	14	9	7	11	4
Yousra Helmy (EGY)	11	9	9	11	11	4	8
Lucie Mobarek (ALG)	4	11	11	9	6	11	11
Lynda Loghraibi (ALG)	8	9	3	3
Hana Goda (EGY)	11	11	11	11

Semifinals
Dina Meshref (EGY)	11	11	11	11
Offiong Edem (NGR)	4	4	7	7
Lucie Mobarek (ALG)	9	5	3	11	11
Hana Goda (EGY)	11	11	11	9	13

Final
Dina Meshref (EGY)	12	6	5	11	11	10
Hana Goda (EGY)	14	11	11	9	7	12

=== Top half ===
==== Section 1 ====
Round of 64
Habibou Derra (BUR)	2	1	1
Hope Udoaka (NGR)	11	11	11
Lisa Nasimuyu (KEN)	6	4	8
Celia Baah-Danso (GHA)	11	11	11
Meron Mekuria (ETH)	6	5	9
Malissa Nasri (ALG)	11	11	11

Round of 32
Dina Meshref (EGY)	11	11	11
Hope Udoaka (NGR)	4	9	2
Celia Baah-Danso (GHA)	8	9	4
Malissa Nasri (ALG)	11	11	11

Round of 16
Dina Meshref (EGY)	11	11	11
Malissa Nasri (ALG)	3	4	7

==== Section 2 ====
Round of 64
Esther Oribamise (NGR)	11	8	11	11
Fana Rezene Ftwi (ETH)	4	11	6	4
Ruth Elenghat (CGO)
Lailaa Edwards (RSA)	w/o
Bernice Borquaye (GHA)	w/o
Loretta Davis (LBR)
Eugénia Simões (ANG)	2	4	5
Sarah Hanffou (CMR)	11	11	11

Round of 32
Esther Oribamise (NGR)	11	11	11
Lailaa Edwards (RSA)	3	7	6
Bernice Borquaye (GHA)	2	8	3
Sarah Hanffou (CMR)	11	11	11

Round of 16
Esther Oribamise (NGR)	9	11	4	4
Sarah Hanffou (CMR)	11	9	11	11

==== Section 3 ====
Round of 64
Marwa Al-Hodaby (EGY)	9	11	11	11
Fatou Kiabou (CIV)	11	2	4	2
Beria Francelle Gamago (CGO)
Kailane Sousa (ANG)	w/o
Mubanga Kunda (ZAM)	4	10	3
Rochica Sonday (RSA)	11	12	11
Doreen Juma (KEN)	1	9	3
Offiong Edem (NGR)	11	11	11

Round of 32
Marwa Al-Hodaby (EGY)	11	11	11
Kailane Sousa (ANG)	3	2	5
Rochica Sonday (RSA)	5	10	9
Offiong Edem (NGR)	11	12	11

Round of 16
Marwa Al-Hodaby (EGY)	9	12	7
Offiong Edem (NGR)	11	14	11

==== Section 4 ====
Round of 64
Fadwa Garci (TUN)	11	4	14	11
Mahenika Andriamanantena (MAD)	6	11	12	6
Ruth Mihindou (GAB)	3	5	7
Jemimah Nakawala (UGA)	11	11	11
Amina Kessaci (ALG)	w/o
Sia Camara (GUI)
Joanita Borteye (GHA)	2	4	6
Mariam Al-Hodaby (EGY)	11	11	11

Round of 32
Fadwa Garci (TUN)	11	11	11
Jemimah Nakawala (UGA)	5	7	9
Amina Kessaci (ALG)	8	2	4
Mariam Al-Hodaby (EGY)	11	11	11

Round of 16
Fadwa Garci (TUN)	7	1	3
Mariam Al-Hodaby (EGY)	11	11	11

=== Bottom half ===
==== Section 5 ====
Round of 64
Yousra Helmy (EGY)	11	11	11
Yirgalem Watiro (ETH)	9	5	9
Thomie Mossemba (CGO)
Danisha Patel (RSA)	w/o
Judith Nangonzi (UGA)	11	11	11
Nelma Moises (ANG)	7	5	2
Yordanos Ngidie Dejene (ETH)	7	6	6
Maram Zoghlami (TUN)	11	11	11

Round of 32
Yousra Helmy (EGY)	11	11	11
Danisha Patel (RSA)	2	8	3
Judith Nangonzi (UGA)	12	11	6	4	11
Maram Zoghlami (TUN)	10	7	11	11	4

Round of 16
Yousra Helmy (EGY)	11	11	11
Judith Nangonzi (UGA)	4	2	7

==== Section 6 ====
Round of 64
Hanitra Raharimanana (MAD)	11	11	11
Nelly Mutuma (KEN)	9	3	5
Eva Adom-Amankwaa (GHA)	11	8	11	3	19
Isabel Albino (ANG)	5	11	5	11	17
Kinfu Feven Tamiru (ETH)	7	7	6
Lucie Mobarek (ALG)	11	11	11
Mamounata Derra (BUR)	3	2	5
Fatimo Bello (NGR)	11	11	11

Round of 32
Hanitra Raharimanana (MAD)	4	8	11	13	11
Eva Adom-Amankwaa (GHA)	11	11	5	11	7
Lucie Mobarek (ALG)	11	11	10	4	11
Fatimo Bello (NGR)	3	6	12	11	8

Round of 16
Hanitra Raharimanana (MAD)	3	9	11	5
Lucie Mobarek (ALG)	11	11	5	11

==== Section 7 ====
Round of 64
Lynda Loghraibi (ALG)	11	11	11
Latifa Nalavwe (ZAM)	3	5	4
Ranto Rakotondrazaka (MAD)	7	11	12	11
Aiyelabegan Sukurat (NGR)	11	6	10	7
Musfiquh Kalam (RSA)	10	11	8	11	11
Hadjer Tahmi (ALG)	12	7	11	8	8
Fatou Bangoura (GUI)
Ruqayyah Kinoo (MRI)	w/o

Round of 32
Lynda Loghraibi (ALG)	11	11	11
Ranto Rakotondrazaka (MAD)	8	9	7
Musfiquh Kalam (RSA)	13	8	12	5	9
Ruqayyah Kinoo (MRI)	11	11	10	11	11

Round of 16
Lynda Loghraibi (ALG)	11	13	4	13
Ruqayyah Kinoo (MRI)	5	11	11	11

==== Section 8 ====
Round of 64
Ruth Tavares (ANG)	11	11	11
Shanitah Namaala (UGA)	2	8	4
Sifa Nafula (KEN)	3	2	4
Cynthia Kwabi (GHA)	11	11	11
Abir Haj Salah (TUN)	w/o
Djagana Guynehe (CGO)

Round of 32
Ruth Tavares (ANG)	2	11	9	8
Cynthia Kwabi (GHA)	11	8	11	11
Abir Haj Salah (TUN)	7	4	5
Hana Goda (EGY)	11	11	11

Round of 16
Cynthia Kwabi (GHA)	6	2	4
Hana Goda (EGY)	11	11	11
