= Algeria at the 2023 African Games =

- Flag of Algeria
- IOC code: ALG
- NOC: Algerian Olympic Committee

in Accra, Ghana 8 March 2024 – 23 March 2024
- Competitors: 198 in 18 sports
- Medals Ranked 4th: Gold 29 Silver 38 Bronze 47 Total 114

African Games appearances (overview)
- 1965; 1973; 1978; 1987; 1991; 1995; 1999; 2003; 2007; 2011; 2015; 2019; 2023

Algeria competed at the 2023 African Games held from 8 to 23 March 2024 in Accra, Ghana. Algeria competed in 18 sports.

== Medal table ==
Medal	Name	Sport	Event	Date
Gold	Ala Salmi	Karate	Men's kumite −60 kg	8 March
Gold	Ayoub Anis Helassa	Karate	Men's kumite −67 kg	8 March
Gold	Louiza Abouriche	Karate	Women's kumite −55 kg	8 March
Gold	Nesrine Houili	Cycling	Women's road race U23	9 March
Gold	Abdelkrim Ouakali	Wrestling	Men's Greco-Roman 77 kg	9 March
Gold	Bachir Sid Azara	Wrestling	Men's Greco-Roman 87 kg	9 March
Gold	Koceila Mammeri; Youcef Sabri Medel	Badminton	Men's doubles	10 March
Gold	Mehdi Bouloussa; Stéphane Ouaiche	Table tennis	Men's doubles	10 March
Gold	Koceila Mammeri; Tanina Mammeri	Badminton	Mixed doubles	10 March
Gold	Lina Nassr	Chess	Women's blitz individual	11 March
Gold	Jaouad Syoud	Swimming	Men's 200 metre breaststroke	11 March
Gold	Abdellah Ardjoune	Swimming	Men's 50 metre backstroke	11 March
Gold	Hamida Rania Nefsi	Swimming	Women's 200 metre breaststroke	11 March
Gold	Samir Fardjallah	Weightlifting	Men's 73 kg total	11 March
Gold	Samir Fardjallah	Weightlifting	Men's 73 kg snatch	11 March
Gold	Samir Fardjallah	Weightlifting	Men's 73 kg clean & jerk	11 March
Gold	Abdellah Ardjoune	Swimming	Men's 100 metre backstroke	12 March
Gold	Jaouad Syoud	Swimming	Men's 400 metre medley	12 March
Gold	Jaouad Syoud	Swimming	Men's 50 metre breaststroke	12 March
Gold	Amina Belkadi	Judo	Women's −63 kg	13 March
Gold	Jaouad Syoud	Swimming	Men's 200 metre medley	13 March
Gold	Mohamed El Mehdi Lili	Judo	Men's +100 kg	14 March
Gold	Zahra Tatar	Athletics	Women's hammer throw	19 March
Gold	Medhi-Amar Rouana	Athletics	Men's pole vault	21 March
Gold	Mehdi Bouhmama; Nael Mohand Yahiatene; Ryad Lefkir; Zayd Yahiaoui	3x3 basketball	Men's U23	22 March
Gold	Ousama Kanouni	Boxing	Men's −86 kg	22 March
Gold	Fatiha Mansouri	Boxing	Women's −48 kg	22 March
Gold	Roumaysa Boualam	Boxing	Women's −50 kg	22 March
Gold	Ichrak Okchaib	Boxing	Women's −63 kg	22 March
Silver	Abdelhadi Ouchaoua; Oussama Zaid; Saber Benmakhlouf	Karate	Men's kata team	7 March
Silver	Aïcha Narimène Dahleb	Karate	Women's kata individual	7 March
Silver	Cylia Ouikene	Karate	Women's kumite −50 kg	8 March
Silver	Adlane Arab; Lina Nassr	Chess	Mixed rapid team	9 March
Silver	Hocine Daikhi; Ousama Zitouni; Falleh Midoune; Oussama Zaid; Ayoub Anis Helassa; Naim Roouichi; Alaa Selmi	Karate	Men's kumite team	9 March
Silver	Fares Benzidoun	Swimming	Men's 200 metre Butterfly	9 March
Silver	Stéphane Ouaiche; Lucie Mobarek	Table tennis	Mixed doubles	9 March
Silver	Ishak Ghaiou	Wrestling	Men's Greco-Roman 67 kg	9 March
Silver	Fadi Rouabah	Wrestling	Men's Greco-Roman 97 kg	9 March
Silver	Halla Bouksani; Tanina Mammeri	Badminton	Women's doubles	10 March
Silver	Jaouad Syoud	Swimming	Men's 100 metre breaststroke	10 March
Silver	Abdellah Ardjoune	Swimming	Men's 200 metre backstroke	10 March
Silver	Nadia Katbi	Weightlifting	Women's 45 kg total	10 March
Silver	Nadia Katbi	Weightlifting	Women's 45 kg snatch	10 March
Silver	Nadia Katbi	Weightlifting	Women's 45 kg clean & jerk	10 March
Silver	Adlane Arab; Lina Nassr	Chess	Mixed blitz team	11 March
Silver	Akram Chekhchoukh	Weightlifting	Men's 67kg total	11 March
Silver	Akram Chekhchoukh	Weightlifting	Men's 67 kg clean & jerk	11 March
Silver	Abdelkader Ikkal	Wrestling	Men's freestyle 74 kg	11 March
Silver	Wali Eddine Kebir	Wrestling	Men's freestyle 97 kg	11 March
Silver	Ramzi Chouchar	Swimming	Men's 400 metre medley	12 March
Silver	Hamida Rania Nefsi	Swimming	Women's 400 metre medley	12 March
Silver	Nesrine Medjahed; Lilia Midouni; Majda Chebaraka; Imène Kawthar Zitouni	Swimming	Women's 4 × 100 metre freestyle relay	12 March
Silver	Wail Ezzine	Judo	Men's −73 kg	13 March
Silver	Faris Touairi	Weightlifting	Men's 96 kg snatch	13 March
Silver	Nihad Belounis	Weightlifting	Women's 76 kg total	13 March
Silver	Nihad Belounis	Weightlifting	Women's 76 kg clean & jerk	13 March
Silver	Abdellah Fala	Judo	Men's −100 kg	14 March
Silver	Nesrine Houili	Cycling	Women's individual time trial U23	15 March
Silver	K Moudetere; W Ezzine; AI Benazoug; A Zmit; M El Mehdi; A Fala / F Aissahine; Z Bouakache; A Belkadi; D Benchallal; L Ichallal	Judo	Mixed teams	15 March
Silver	Oussama Khennoussi	Athletics	Men's discus throw	18 March
Silver	Amine Bouanani	Athletics	Men's 110 metres hurdles	19 March
Silver	Zouina Bouzebra	Athletics	Women's hammer throw	19 March
Silver	Yasser Triki	Athletics	Men's long jump	22 March
Silver	Mohammed Houmri	Boxing	Men's −80 kg	22 March
Silver	Chahira Selmouni	Boxing	Women's −57 kg	22 March
Silver	Saker Chahine	Taekwondo	Men's under 30	22 March
Silver	Nassir Merdaci	Taekwondo	Men's under 40	22 March
Bronze	Lucie Mobarek	Table tennis	Women's singles	5 March
Bronze	Oussama Zaid	Karate	Men's kumite −75 kg	7 March
Bronze	Hocine Daikhi	Karate	Men's kumite +84 kg	7 March
Bronze	Chaima Midi	Karate	Women's kumite −61 kg	7 March
Bronze	Karima Mekkaoui	Karate	Women's kumite −68 kg	7 March
Bronze	Chaïma Oudira	Karate	Women's kumite +68 kg	7 March
Bronze	Saber Benmakhlouf	Karate	Men's kata individual	8 March
Bronze	Rayane Salakedji; Aïcha Narimène Dahleb; Aya Ouled El Arabi	Karate	Women's kata team	8 March
Bronze	Maheidine Bella; Mehdi Bouloussa; Milhane Jellouli; Sami Kherouf; Stéphane Ouaiche	Table tennis	Men's team	8 March
Bronze	Nesrine Medjahed; Lilia Midouni; Mehdi Nazim Benbara; Jaouad Syoud; Akram Ammar; Jihane Benchdli; Youcef Bouzouia	Swimming	Mixed 4 × 100 metre freestyle relay	9 March
Bronze	Abdelkarim Fergat	Wrestling	Men's Greco-Roman 60 kg	9 March
Bronze	Hamza Haloui	Wrestling	Men's Greco-Roman 130 kg	9 March
Bronze	Adlane Arab	Chess	Men's rapid individual	10 March
Bronze	Lina Nassr	Chess	Women's rapid individual	10 March
Bronze	Hamida Rania Nefsi	Swimming	Women's 100 metre breaststroke	10 March
Bronze	Hamida Rania Nefsi; Nesrine Medjahed; Abdellah Ardjoune; Jaouad Syoud; Majda Chebaraka; Mehdi Nazim Benbara; Youcef Bouzouia	Swimming	Mixed 4 × 100 metre medley relay	10 March
Bronze	Lucie Mobarek; Lynda Loghraibi	Table tennis	Women's doubles	10 March
Bronze	Mohamed Hamour; Fares Benzidoun; Jaouad Syoud; Moncef Balamane	Swimming	Men's 4 × 200 metre freestyle relay	11 March
Bronze	Hamida Rania Nefsi; Nesrine Medjahed; Lilia Midouni; Majda Chebaraka	Swimming	Women's 4 × 200 metre freestyle relay	11 March
Bronze	Akram Chekhchoukh	Weightlifting	Men's 67 kg snatch	11 March
Bronze	Hamza Haloui	Wrestling	Men's freestyle 125 kg	11 March
Bronze	Kais Moudetere	Judo	Men's −66 kg	12 March
Bronze	Mohamed Messaour	Weightlifting	Men's 89 kg total	12 March
Bronze	Ikram Cherara	Weightlifting	Women's 64 kg total	12 March
Bronze	Ikram Cherara	Weightlifting	Women's 64 kg clean & jerk	12 March
Bronze	Moncef Balamane	Swimming	Men's 200 metre medley	13 March
Bronze	Moncef Benbara; Youcef Bouzouia; Mohamed Hamour; Akram Ammar	Swimming	Men's 4 × 100 metre medley relay	13 March
Bronze	Hamida Rania Nefsi	Swimming	Women's 200 metre medley	13 March
Bronze	Hamida Rania Nefsi; Nesrine Medjahed; Lilia Midouni; Imene Zitouni	Swimming	Women's 4 × 100 metre medley relay	13 March
Bronze	Majda Chebaraka	Swimming	Women's 800 metre freestyle	13 March
Bronze	Faris Touairi	Weightlifting	Men's 96 kg total	13 March
Bronze	Faris Touairi	Weightlifting	Men's 96 kg clean & jerk	13 March
Bronze	Nihad Belounis	Weightlifting	Women's 76 kg snatch	13 March
Bronze	Yahia Mamoun Amina	Weightlifting	Women's +87 kg total	14 March
Bronze	Yahia Mamoun Amina	Weightlifting	Women's +87 kg snatch	14 March
Bronze	Yahia Mamoun Amina	Weightlifting	Women's +87 kg clean & jerk	14 March
Bronze	Kahina Mebarki	Triathlon	Women	15 March
Bronze	Dhiae Boudoumi	Athletics	Men's decathlon	19 March
Bronze	Darina Hadil Rezik	Athletics	Women's high jump	19 March
Bronze	Hani Tebib	Taekwondo	Men's −74 kg	19 March
Bronze	Ismail Benhammouda	Athletics	Men's 20 kilometres walk	20 March
Bronze	Souad Azzi	Athletics	Women's 20 kilometres walk	20 March
Bronze	Oussama Mordjane	Boxing	Men's −60 kg	22 March
Bronze	Jugurtha Ait Beka	Boxing	Men's −63.5 kg	22 March
Bronze	Abdenacer Belarbi	Boxing	Men's −67 kg	22 March
Bronze	Ahmed Ghazli	Boxing	Men's −75 kg	22 March
Bronze	Hadjila Khelif	Boxing	Women's −60 kg	22 March

== Gallery ==
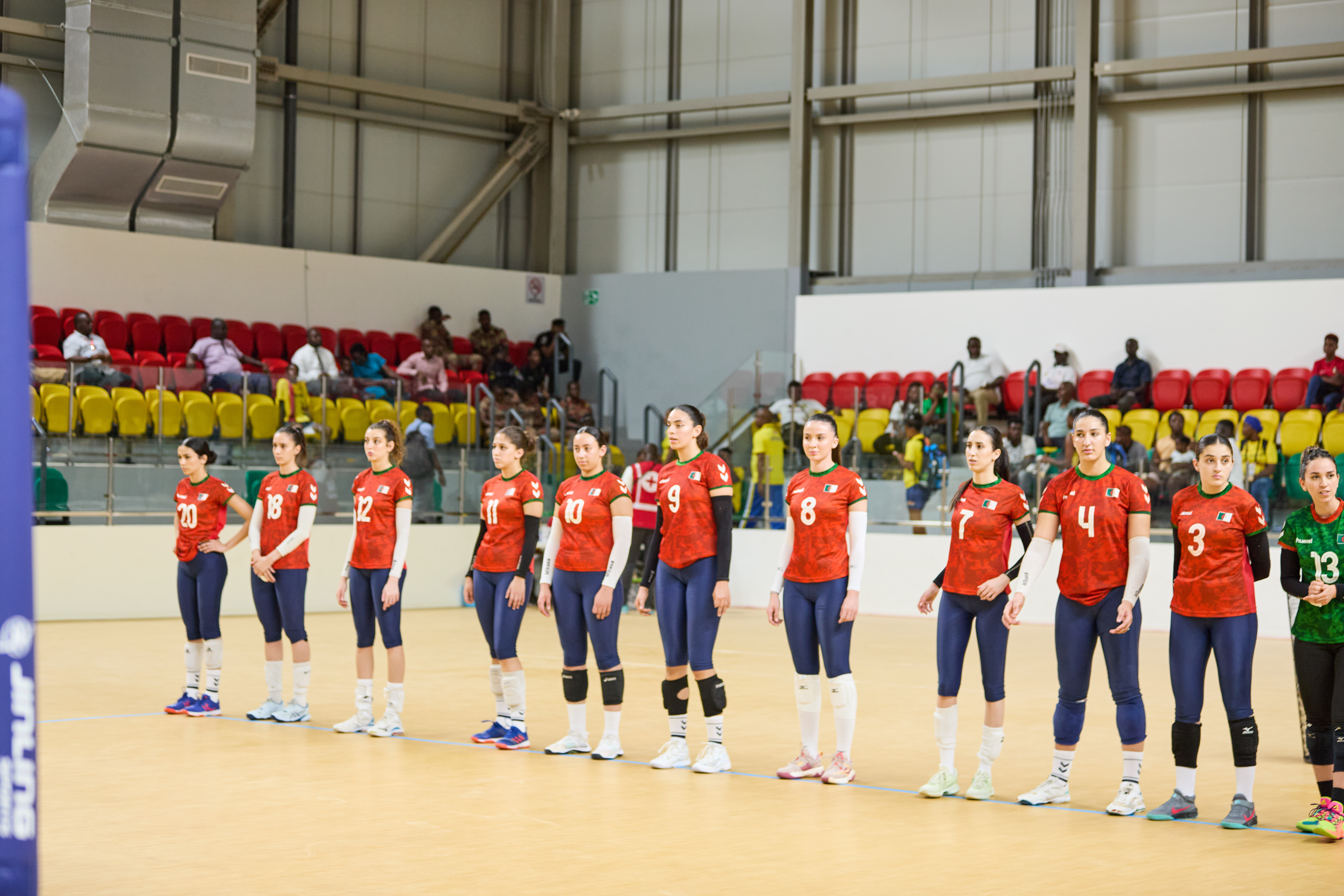

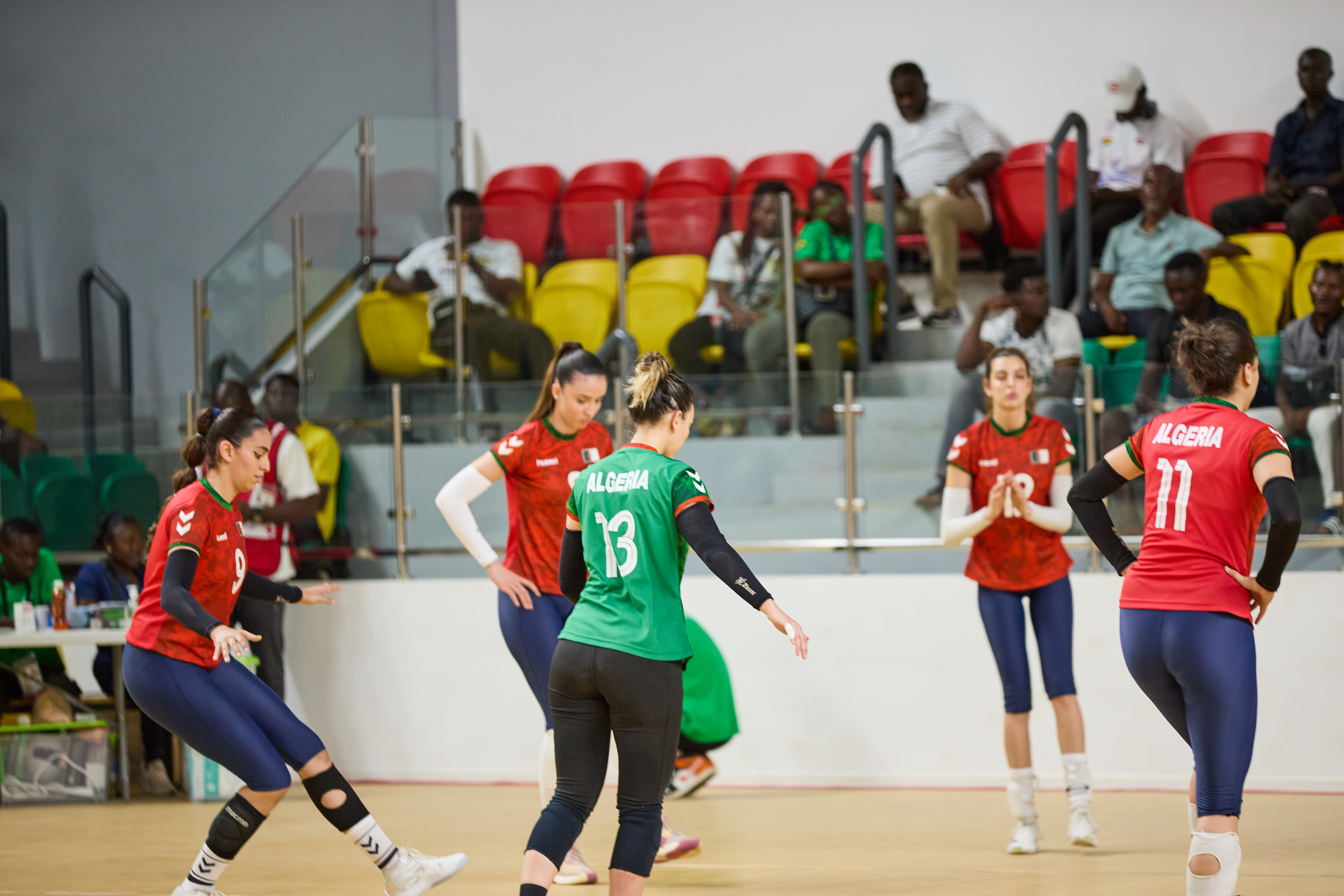

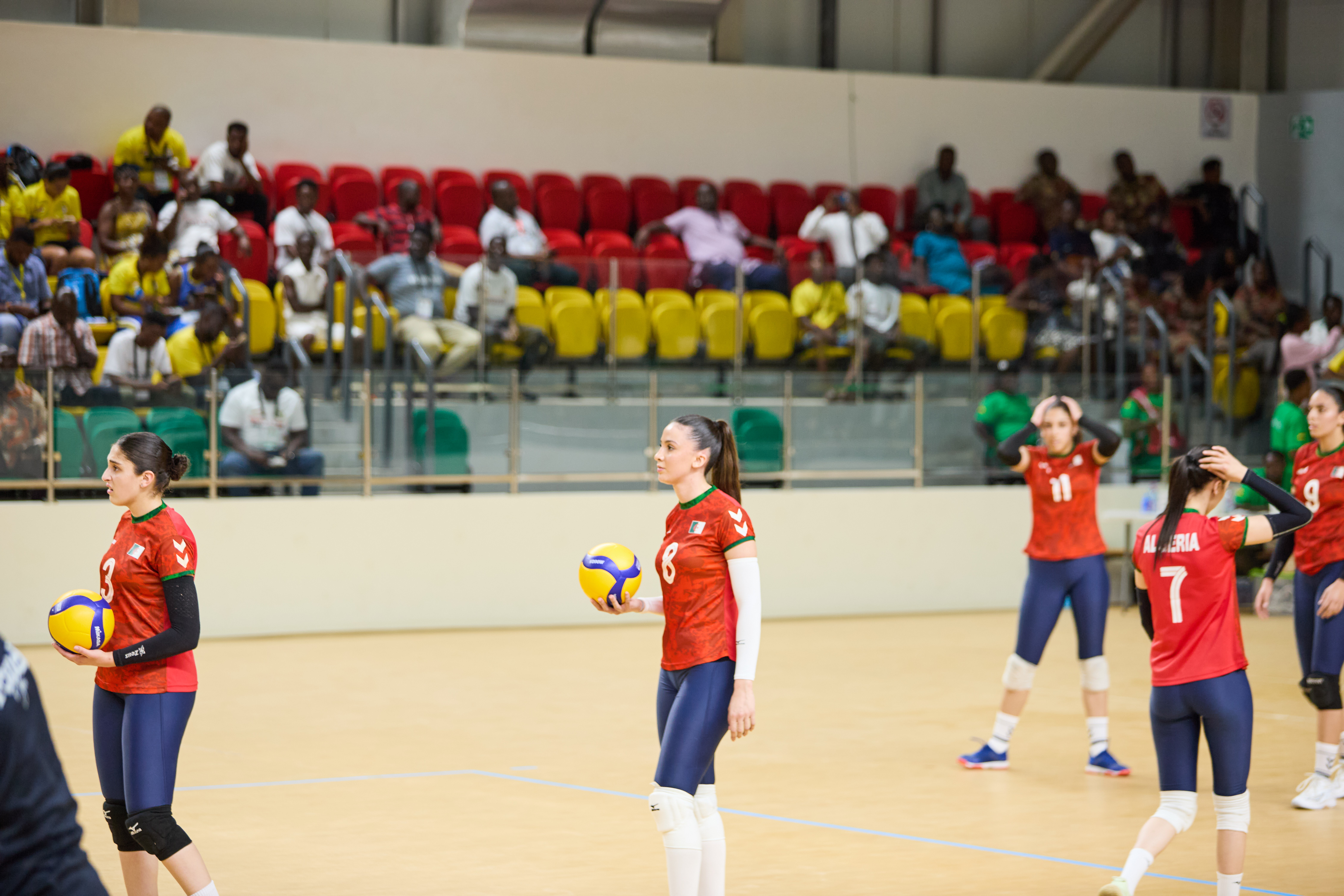

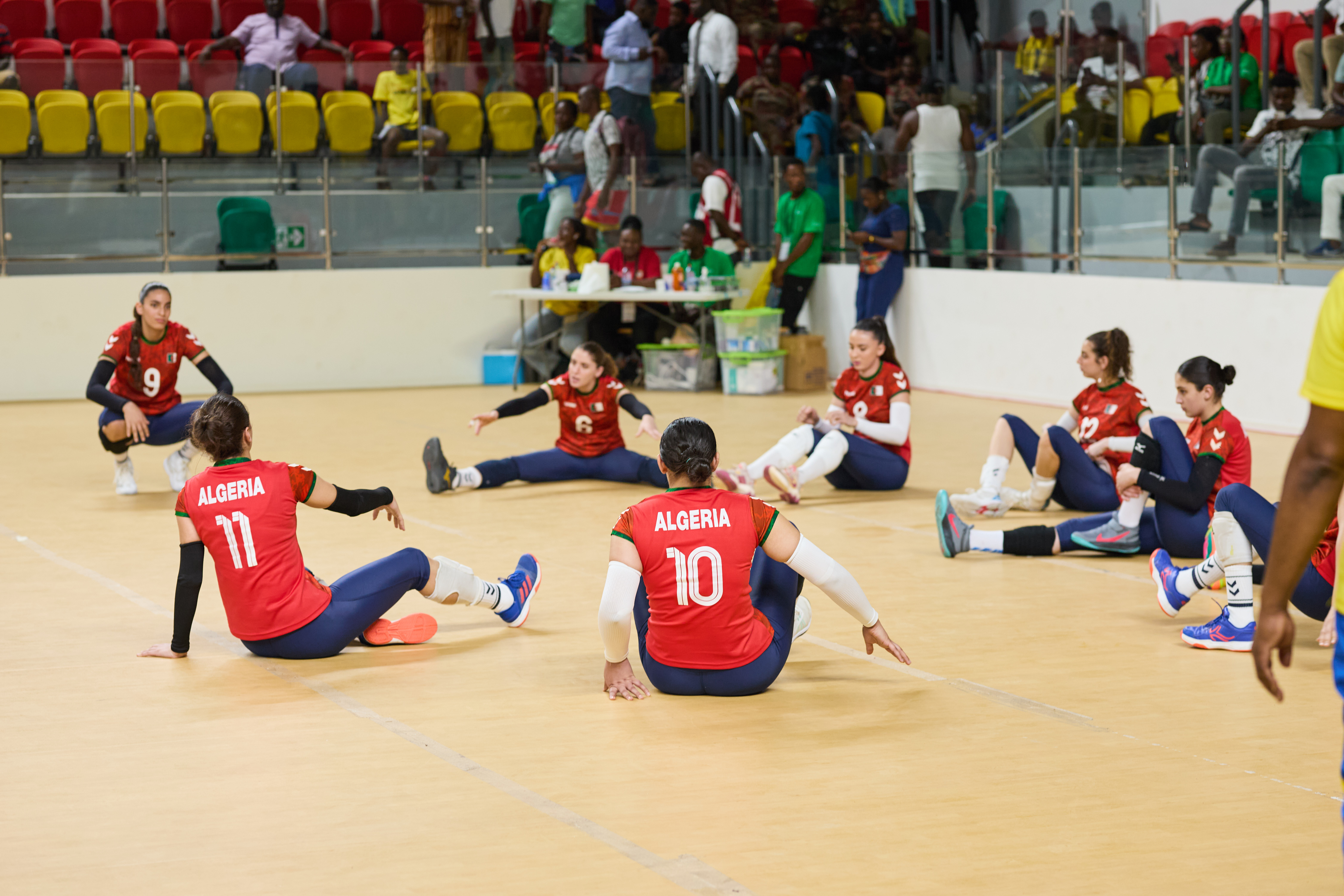
