= Somalia at the 2019 African Games =

- Flag of Somalia
- IOC code: SOM
- NOC: Somali Olympic Committee
- Website: www.nocsom.com/so/ (in Somali)

in Rabat, Morocco 19 August 2019 – 31 August 2019
- Competitors: 11 (7 men and 4 women) in 3 sports
- Medals: Gold 0 Silver 0 Bronze 0 Total 0

African Games appearances
- 1973; 1978–2007; 2011; 2015; 2019; 2023

Somalia competed at the 2019 African Games held from 19 to 31 August 2019 in Rabat, Morocco. In total, athletes representing Somalia competed in three sports and did not win any medals.

== Athletics ==
Somalia had two male competitors compete in athletics; Abdirashid Yusuf Ali who competed in the men's 800 metres and Abdullahi Jama Mohamed who participated in the men's 1500 metres.

Abdirashid Yusuf Ali did not qualify to compete in the semifinals and Abdullahi Jama Mohamed finished in 9th place in the final.

== Boxing ==
Four men (Note: Hassan Muse Abdi, Omar Abdi Ali Jumale, Mahmod Said, and Adan Ahmed Mohamed) and one woman, Ramla Said Ahmed Ali, represented Somalia in the Boxing events at the games. On Ahmed Ali competed in the Women's featherweight event. On 24 August, she lost her match against Marcelat Sakobi Matshu of the Democratic Republic of the Congo.

== Taekwondo ==
Somalia had three women (Note: Munirah Warsame Abdiwahid, Nasteeha Abdi Mohamed, and Ilhan Adam Ismail) and one man, Abdulahi Faud Dahir, participate in Taekwondo at the games in 2019.
