= Boxing at the 2023 African Games =

- Venue: Bukom Boxing Arena
- Location: Accra, Ghana
- Dates: 15–22 March 2024

Boxing at the 2023 African Games was held from 15 to 22 March 2024 at the Bukom Boxing Arena in Accra, Ghana.

== Results ==
=== Men's events ===
| Event | Gold | Silver | Bronze |
|---|---|---|---|
| 48 kg | Mohammed Aryeetey; Ghana | Livens Tulembekwa Zola; Democratic Republic of the Congo | Hamza Essaadi; Morocco |
| 48 kg | Mohammed Aryeetey; Ghana | Livens Tulembekwa Zola; Democratic Republic of the Congo | Innocent Tumusiime; Uganda |
| 51 kg | Patrick Chinyemba; Zambia | Lubabalo Lusizi; South Africa | Theophilus Allotey; Ghana |
| 51 kg | Patrick Chinyemba; Zambia | Lubabalo Lusizi; South Africa | Fabrice Valérie; Mauritius |
| 54 kg | Amadu Mohammed; Ghana | Mwengo Mwale; Zambia | Imad Azoui; Morocco |
| 54 kg | Amadu Mohammed; Ghana | Mwengo Mwale; Zambia | Franck Mombey; Gabon |
| 57 kg | Omole Dolapo; Nigeria | Armando Rugoberto Sigauque; Mozambique | Albert Ngulube; Zambia |
| 57 kg | Omole Dolapo; Nigeria | Armando Rugoberto Sigauque; Mozambique | Kasim Murungi; Uganda |
| 60 kg | Joseph Commey; Ghana | Andrew Chilata; Zambia | Oussama Mordjane; Algeria |
| 60 kg | Joseph Commey; Ghana | Andrew Chilata; Zambia | Ezra Paulo Mwanjwango; Tanzania |
| 63.5 kg | Samuel Takyi; Ghana | Emmanuel Katema; Zambia | John Paul Masamba; South Africa |
| 63.5 kg | Samuel Takyi; Ghana | Emmanuel Katema; Zambia | Jugurtha Ait-Bekka; Algeria |
| 67 kg | Gerald Kabinda; Zambia | Boniface Zengala; Democratic Republic of the Congo | Abdenacer Belarbi; Algeria |
| 67 kg | Gerald Kabinda; Zambia | Boniface Zengala; Democratic Republic of the Congo | Zakaria Romdhani; Tunisia |
| 71 kg | Steve Kulenguluka; Democratic Republic of the Congo | Omar El-Sayed; Egypt | Antoine Mendy; Senegal |
| 71 kg | Steve Kulenguluka; Democratic Republic of the Congo | Omar El-Sayed; Egypt | Muzamir Semuddu; Uganda |
| 75 kg | Edwin Owuor; Kenya | Yassine Elouarz; Morocco | Ahmed Ghazli; Algeria |
| 75 kg | Edwin Owuor; Kenya | Yassine Elouarz; Morocco | Temesgen Mitiku; Ethiopia |
| 80 kg | Peter Pita; Democratic Republic of the Congo | Mohammed Houmri; Algeria | Yusuf Changalawe; Tanzania |
| 80 kg | Peter Pita; Democratic Republic of the Congo | Mohammed Houmri; Algeria | Junior Fotouo; Cameroon |
| 86 kg | Oussama Kanouni; Algeria | Abubakar Kamoko; Ghana | Musa Maregesi; Tanzania |
| 86 kg | Oussama Kanouni; Algeria | Abubakar Kamoko; Ghana | Nathan Nlandu Mbeli; Democratic Republic of the Congo |
| 92 kg | Adam Olaore; Nigeria | Kevin Kuadjovi; Togo | Ali El-Salamony; Egypt |
| 92 kg | Adam Olaore; Nigeria | Kevin Kuadjovi; Togo | Symphorien Njinnou Mouandat; Gabon |
| +92 kg | Ifeanyi Onyekwere; Nigeria | Yann Mike Mansogo; Equatorial Guinea | Anthony Bweluzeyi; Democratic Republic of the Congo |
| +92 kg | Ifeanyi Onyekwere; Nigeria | Yann Mike Mansogo; Equatorial Guinea | Diarga Baldé; Senegal |

=== Women's events ===
| Event | Gold | Silver | Bronze |
|---|---|---|---|
| 48 kg | Fatiha Mansouri; Algeria | Wafa Hafsi; Tunisia | Janet Acquah; Ghana |
| 48 kg | Fatiha Mansouri; Algeria | Wafa Hafsi; Tunisia | Margret Tembo; Zambia |
| 50 kg | Roumaysa Boualam; Algeria | Zainab Adeshina; Nigeria | Yasmine Moutaqui; Morocco |
| 50 kg | Roumaysa Boualam; Algeria | Zainab Adeshina; Nigeria | Grace Fahnbulleh; Liberia |
| 52 kg | Gezahegn Betelhem; Ethiopia | Rabab Cheddar; Morocco | Gisele Nyembo Muamba; Democratic Republic of the Congo |
| 52 kg | Gezahegn Betelhem; Ethiopia | Rabab Cheddar; Morocco | Chadha Jlassi; Tunisia |
| 54 kg | Widad Bertal; Morocco | Shukura Kareem; Nigeria | Yomna Ayyad; Egypt |
| 54 kg | Widad Bertal; Morocco | Shukura Kareem; Nigeria | Amina Faki; Kenya |
| 57 kg | Ojo Nene Joy; Nigeria | Chahira Selmouni; Algeria | Khouloud Hlimi; Tunisia |
| 57 kg | Ojo Nene Joy; Nigeria | Chahira Selmouni; Algeria | Keamogetse Kenosi; Botswana |
| 60 kg | Cynthia Ogunsemilore; Nigeria | Rahma Mohamed; Egypt | Hadjila Khelif; Algeria |
| 60 kg | Cynthia Ogunsemilore; Nigeria | Rahma Mohamed; Egypt | Azza Nahdi; Tunisia |
| 63 kg | Ichrak Chaib; Algeria | Merveille Mbalayi; Democratic Republic of the Congo | Not awarded |
| 66 kg | Bethelhem Wolde; Ethiopia | Isabel Mulungo; Mozambique | Not awarded |
| 70 kg | Blessing Oraekwe; Nigeria | Alcinda Dos Santos; Mozambique | Eya Ben Zina; Tunisia |
| 70 kg | Blessing Oraekwe; Nigeria | Alcinda Dos Santos; Mozambique | Brigitte Mbabi; Democratic Republic of the Congo |
| 75 kg | Patricia Mbata; Nigeria | Molka Ben Mabrouk; Tunisia | Rady Gramane; Mozambique |
| 81 kg | Jacinta Umunnakwe; Nigeria | Marie Joël Mwika; Democratic Republic of the Congo | Not awarded |
| +81 kg | Khadija El-Mardi; Morocco | Jorbelle Malewu; Democratic Republic of the Congo | Not awarded |

== Medal table ==
* Host nation (Ghana)

| Rank | Nation | Gold | Silver | Bronze | Total |
|---|---|---|---|---|---|
| 1 | Nigeria (NGR) | 8 | 2 | 0 | 10 |
| 2 | Algeria (ALG) | 4 | 2 | 5 | 11 |
| 3 | Ghana (GHA)* | 4 | 1 | 2 | 7 |
| 4 | Democratic Republic of the Congo (COD) | 2 | 5 | 4 | 11 |
| 5 | Zambia (ZAM) | 2 | 3 | 2 | 7 |
| 6 | Morocco (MAR) | 2 | 2 | 3 | 7 |
| 7 | Ethiopia (ETH) | 2 | 0 | 1 | 3 |
| 8 | Kenya (KEN) | 1 | 0 | 1 | 2 |
| 9 | Mozambique (MOZ) | 0 | 3 | 1 | 4 |
| 10 | Tunisia (TUN) | 0 | 2 | 5 | 7 |
| 11 | Egypt (EGY) | 0 | 2 | 2 | 4 |
| 12 | South Africa (RSA) | 0 | 1 | 1 | 2 |
| 13 | Equatorial Guinea (GEQ) | 0 | 1 | 0 | 1 |
| 13 | Togo (TOG) | 0 | 1 | 0 | 1 |
| 15 | Tanzania (TAN) | 0 | 0 | 3 | 3 |
| 15 | Uganda (UGA) | 0 | 0 | 3 | 3 |
| 17 | Gabon (GAB) | 0 | 0 | 2 | 2 |
| 17 | Senegal (SEN) | 0 | 0 | 2 | 2 |
| 19 | Botswana (BOT) | 0 | 0 | 1 | 1 |
| 19 | Cameroon (CMR) | 0 | 0 | 1 | 1 |
| 19 | Liberia (LBR) | 0 | 0 | 1 | 1 |
| 19 | Mauritius (MRI) | 0 | 0 | 1 | 1 |
| Totals (22 entries) | | 25 | 25 | 41 | 91 |
