= Swimming at the 2023 African Games =

- Venue: Borteyman Sports Complex Aquatics Center
- Location: Accra, Ghana
- Dates: 9–13 March 2024

Swimming at the 2023 African Games was held from 9 to 13 March 2024 at the Borteyman Sports Complex Aquatics Center in Accra, Ghana.

The event served as a qualifier for the 2024 Summer Olympics in Paris, France.

== Results ==
=== Men's events ===
Event	Gold		Silver		Bronze	
50 m freestyle	Ali Khalafalla; Egypt	22.02; GR	Clayton Jimmie; South Africa	22.54	Xander Skinner; Namibia	22.67
100 m freestyle	Clayton Jimmie; South Africa	49.29	Xander Skinner; Namibia	49.97	Abdalla Nasr; Egypt	50.99
200 m freestyle	Marwan Elkamash; Egypt	1:49.75	Abdalla Nasr; Egypt	1:50.39	Andrew Ross; South Africa	1:51.09
400 m freestyle	Marwan Elkamash; Egypt	3:51.79	Matthew Caldwell; South Africa	3:57.70	Cameron Casali; South Africa	3:58.73
800 m freestyle	Marwan Elkamash; Egypt	8:04.25	Matthew Caldwell; South Africa	8:19.45	Ali Ahmed; Egypt	8:23.68
1500 m freestyle	Marwan Elkamash; Egypt	15:39.07	Ali Ahmed; Egypt	15:58.23	Matthew Caldwell; South Africa	16:10.89
50 m backstroke	Abdellah Ardjoune; Algeria Jonah Pool-Jones; South Africa	25.85	Not awarded		Steven Aimable; Senegal	26.31
100 m backstroke	Abdellah Ardjoune; Algeria	55.94	Denilson Cyprianos; Zimbabwe	56.32	Jonah Pool-Jones; South Africa	56.98
200 m backstroke	Denilson Cyprianos; Zimbabwe	2:01.96	Abdellah Ardjoune; Algeria	2:02.22	Helgaard Muller; South Africa	2:03.99
50 m breaststroke	Jaouad Syoud; Algeria	27.98	Youssef El-Kamash; Egypt	28.27	Adrian Robinson; Botswana	28.28
100 m breaststroke	Ronan Wantenaar; Namibia	1:01.86	Jaouad Syoud; Algeria	1:01.93	Adrian Robinson; Botswana	1:03.03
200 m breaststroke	Jaouad Syoud; Algeria	2:14.82	Ronan Wantenaar; Namibia	2:15.52	Andrew Ross; South Africa	2:18.20
50 m butterfly	Ali Khalafalla; Egypt	23.93	Abeiku Jackson; Ghana	24.23	Jarden Eaton; South Africa	24.42
100 m butterfly	Abdalla Nasr; Egypt	53.29	Jarden Eaton; South Africa	53.45	Abeiku Jackson; Ghana	53.80
200 m butterfly	Abdalla Nasr; Egypt	2:01.87	Fares Benzidoune; Algeria	2:02.21	Liam Vehbi; South Africa	2:03.79
200 m individual medley	Jaouad Syoud; Algeria	2:01.44	Andrew Ross; South Africa	2:03.26	Moncef Balamane; Algeria	2:05.32
400 m individual medley	Jaouad Syoud; Algeria	4:24.59	Ramzi Chouchar; Algeria	4:30.95	Liam Vehbi; South Africa	4:31.54
4 × 100 m freestyle relay	South Africa (RSA); Kaydn Naidoo (52.02); Owethu Mahan (51.75); Andrew Ross (50.56); Clayton Jimmie (49.53); Jarden Eaton^{[a]} Cameron Casali^{[a]} Liam Vehbi^{[a]} Jonah Pool-Jones^{[a]}	3:23.86	Egypt (EGY); Abdalla Nasr (51.57); Ibrahim Shamseldin (51.51); Mohamed Derbala (51.77); Marwan Elkamash (50.58); Atia El Rahman^{[a]}	3:25.43	Nigeria (NGR); Abduljabar Adama (52.28); Clinton Opute (51.23); Tobi Sijuade (51.10); Colins Ebingha (51.40)	3:26.01
4 × 200 m freestyle relay	Egypt (EGY); Ibrahim Shamseldin (1:52.83); Karim Mahmoud (1:53.67); Abdalla Nasr (1:50.76); Marwan Elkamash (1:50.73)	7:27.62	South Africa (RSA); Andrew Ross (1:51.99); Tumelo Mahan (1:53.82); Cameron Casali (1:52.41); Matthew Caldwell (1:53.64)	7:31.86	Algeria (ALG); Fares Benzidoune (1:59.34); Mohamed Hamour (1:55.52); Jaouad Syoud (1:56.34); Moncef Balamane (1:56.81)	7:48.01
4 × 100 m medley relay	South Africa (RSA); Jonah Pool-Jones (56.93); Petrus Truter (1:02.36); Jarden Eaton (54.04); Clayton Jimmie (49.74); Helgaard Muller^{[a]} Andrew Ross^{[a]} Kaydn Naidoo^{[a]} Tumelo Mahan^{[a]}	3:43.07	Egypt (EGY); Ali Ahmed (57.60); Youssef El-Kamash (1:03.13); Abdalla Nasr(52.98); Marwan Elkamash (51.08); Mohamed Derbala^{[a]} Ibrahim Shamseldin^{[a]}	3:44.79	Algeria (ALG); Abdellah Ardjoune (56.19); Jaouad Syoud (1:03.11); Fares Benzidoune (54.65); Mohamed Hamour (51.72); Moncef Benbara^{[a]} Youcef Bouzouia^{[a]} Akram Amine Ammar^{[a]}	3:45.67

^{a} Swimmers who participated in the heats only and received medals.

=== Women's events ===
Event	Gold		Silver		Bronze	
50 m freestyle	Farida Osman; Egypt	24.72; GR	Caitlin de Lange; South Africa	24.99	Mia Phiri; Zambia	26.27
100 m freestyle	Caitlin de Lange; South Africa	55.53	Farida Osman; Egypt	55.62	Gloria Muzito; Uganda	56.01
200 m freestyle	Lojine Hamed; Egypt	2:03.63	Hannah Mouton; South Africa	2:04.08	Catherine van Rensburg; South Africa	2:04.35
400 m freestyle	Catherine van Rensburg; South Africa	4:17.92	Lojine Hamed; Egypt	4:19.34	Hannah Mouton; South Africa	4:22.89
800 m freestyle	Catherine van Rensburg; South Africa	8:50.78	Lojine Hamed; Egypt	9:08.82	Majda Chebaraka; Algeria	9:39.28
1500 m freestyle	Catherine van Rensburg; South Africa	16:47.61; GR	Lojine Hamed; Egypt	17:13.46	Rafaela Santo; Angola	18:38.70
50 m backstroke	Caitlin de Lange; South Africa	28.76; GR	Tayla Jonker; South Africa	29.00	Mia Phiri; Zambia	29.17
100 m backstroke	Sara El-Sammany; Egypt	1:03.31	Tayla Jonker; South Africa	1:03.36	Donata Katai; Zimbabwe	1:03.77
200 m backstroke	Anishta Teeluck; Mauritius	2:17.71	Tayla Jonker; South Africa	2:21.84	Jessica Humphrey; Namibia	2:21.84
50 m breaststroke	Simone Moll; South Africa	31.91	Kate Meyer; South Africa	33.03	Nadine Abdallah; Egypt	33.37
100 m breaststroke	Simone Moll; South Africa	1:09.50	Georgia Els; South Africa	1:09.91	Hamida Rania Nefsi; Algeria	1:12.67
200 m breaststroke	Hamida Rania Nefsi; Algeria	2:33.33	Kate Meyer; South Africa	2:35.35	Georgia Els; South Africa	2:37.17
50 m butterfly	Farida Osman; Egypt	26.02	Caitlin de Lange; South Africa	26.81	Oumy Diop; Senegal	27.30
100 m butterfly	Farida Osman; Egypt	58.81	Nour Elgendy; Egypt	1:01.19	Oumy Diop; Senegal	1:01.95
200 m butterfly	Nour Elgendy; Egypt	2:15.12	Leigh McMorran; South Africa	2:19.06	Jasmine Eissa; Egypt	2:20.22
200 m individual medley	Georgia Els; South Africa	2:17.65	Nour Elgendy; Egypt	2:19.74	Hamida Rania Nefsi; Algeria	2:20.51
400 m individual medley	Catherine van Rensburg; South Africa	4:56.13	Hamida Rania Nefsi; Algeria	5:01.60	Kate Meyer; South Africa	5:02.63
4 × 100 m freestyle relay	Egypt (EGY); Farida Osman (55.86); Nour Elgendy (57.53); Lojine Hamed (57.54); Nadine Abdallah (57.54)	3:48.47; GR	Algeria (ALG); Nesrine Medjahed (58.17); Lilia Midouni (58.98); Majda Chebaraka (1:00.32); Imene Zitouni (1:00.59)	3:58.06	Zimbabwe (ZIM); Paige van der Westhuizen (58.89); Vhenekai Dhemba (1:04.21); Donata Katai (1:03.60); Mikayla Makwabarara (1:00.86)	4:07.56
4 × 200 m freestyle relay	South Africa (RSA); Hannah Mouton (2:05.25); Leigh McMorran (2:08.67); Kate Meyer (2:07.97); Catherine van Rensburg (2:05.42)	8:27.31	Egypt (EGY); Nour Elgendy (2:08.23); Nadine Abdallah (2:09.58); Rawan El-Damaty (2:08.10); Lojine Hamed (2:09.27)	8:35.18	Algeria (ALG); Majda Chebaraka (2:12.57); Nesrine Medjahed (2:13.41); Hamida Rania Nefsi (2:16.11); Lilia Midouni (2:15.34)	8:57.43
4 × 100 m medley relay	South Africa (RSA); Tayla Jonker (1:02.97); Simone Moll (1:09.69); Hannah Mouton (1:04.38); Caitlin de Lange (54.85)	4:11.89	Egypt (EGY); Sara El-Sammany (1:03.59); Nadine Abdallah (1:14.65); Farida Osman (59.39); Nour Elgendy (1:00.18)	4:17.81	Algeria (ALG); Imene Zitouni (1:08.64); Hamida Rania Nefsi (1:12.90); Lilia Midouni (1:04.39); Nesrine Medjahed (59.76)	4:25.69

=== Mixed events ===
Event	Gold		Silver		Bronze	
4 × 100 m freestyle relay	South Africa (RSA); Caitlin de Lange (56.55); Georgia Els (57.42); Andrew Ross (50.37); Clayton Jimmie (50.07); Hannah Mouton^{[b]} Kaydn Naidoo^{[b]}	3:34.41	Egypt (EGY); Farida Osman (57.05); Nadine Abdallah (57.38); Ali Khalafalla (51.54); Abdalla Nasr (51.04); Karim Mahmoud^{[b]} Mohamed Derbala^{[b]} Hla Naanoush^{[b]} Ganat Soliman^{[b]}	3:37.01	Algeria (ALG); Jaouad Syoud (51.10); Mehdi Nazim Benbara (51.51); Lilia Midouni (59.52); Nesrine Medjahed (58.32); Youcef Bouzouia^{[b]} Jihane Benchadli^{[b]} Akram Ammar^{[b]}	3:40.45
4 × 100 m medley relay	South Africa (RSA); Tayla Jonker (1:04.22); Petrus Truter (1:04.28); Jarden Eaton (53.53); Caitlin de Lange (55.53); Jonah Pool-Jones^{[b]} Simone Moll^{[b]} Kaydn Naidoo^{[b]} Hannah Mouton^{[b]}	3:57.56	Egypt (EGY); Atia El Rahman (1:03.05); Youssef El-Kamash (1:03.55); Farida Osman (59.47); Nadine Abdallah (57.19); Ali Ahmed^{[b]} Karim Mahmoud^{[b]} Jasmine Eissa^{[b]} Nour Elgendy^{[b]}	4:03.26	Algeria (ALG); Abdellah Ardjoune (59.37); Hamida Rania Nefsi (1:12.21); Jaouad Syoud (54.53); Nesrine Medjahed (57.23); Mehdi Nazim Benbara^{[b]} Youcef Bouzouia^{[b]} Majda Chebaraka^{[b]}	4:03.34

^{b} Swimmers who participated in the heats only and received medals.

== Medal table ==
* Host nation (Ghana)

Rank	Nation	Gold	Silver	Bronze	Total
1	South Africa (RSA)	17	16	13	46
2	Egypt (EGY)	16	15	4	35
3	Algeria (ALG)	7	6	10	23
4	Namibia (NAM)	1	2	2	5
5	Zimbabwe (ZIM)	1	1	2	4
6	Mauritius (MRI)	1	0	0	1
7	Ghana (GHA)*	0	1	1	2
8	Senegal (SEN)	0	0	3	3
9	Botswana (BOT)	0	0	2	2
9	Zambia (ZAM)	0	0	2	2
11	Angola (ANG)	0	0	1	1
11	Nigeria (NGR)	0	0	1	1
11	Uganda (UGA)	0	0	1	1
Totals (13 entries)		43	41	42	126
