= Moamen Mohamed =

Egyptian karateka (born 1999)

Personal information
- Nationality: Egyptian
- Born: Moamen Ahmed Said Ibrahim Mohamed; July 12, 1999 (age 27) Alexandria, Egypt
- Height: 171 cm (5 ft 7 in)
- Weight: 66 kg (146 lb)
Medal record
Representing (Egypt)

Moamen Ahmed Said Ibrahim Mohamed (Arabic: مُؤْمِن أَحْمَد سَعِيد إِبْرَاهِيم مُحَمَّد, born July 12, 1999, in Alexandria, Egypt), also known as Moamen Omar (Arabic: مُؤْمِن عُمَر), is an Egyptian Karate and is a member of the Egyptian national karate team.

== Education ==
In June 2022, Moamen received BA degree in pharmacy from the Arab Academy for Science, Technology and Maritime Transport.

== Career ==
Moamen began practicing karate at the age of 4 in the Nahhas Company Club, where he won first place and his first medal in his sports career at the Alexandria Championship under the age of 9. Moamen joined the Suof Club, where he won first place in the Republic Championship for 5 consecutive years, and in 2013 he joined Smouha Club as a member of the Egyptian national karate team.

in 2017, Moamen competed at the World Karate Championships in Spain and won the silver medal, followed by a bronze medal in the 2019 World Karate Championships in Chile, and was the Egyptian team captain during the tournament.

From 2015 to 2017, he competed for the Shabab Al Ahli Club in the UAE, and won the UAE President's Cup and the UAE League. In 2019, he competed for Al Hilal SFC where he won first place in the Arab Cup Winners' Cup.

Egyptian President Abdel Fattah el-Sisi awarded Moamen the Order of the Republic in Sports for his contributions to competitive Karate in 2020.

Moamen won a gold medal in the 2022 Series A Tournament which was held in Kocaeli Province, and a bronze medal in Series A which was held in Cairo in the 67 kg division. Moamen secured second place at US Open 2023 in Las Vegas on April 7–9, 2023.

== International competitions ==
Year	Competition	Venue	Position	Notes
Representing the (Egypt)
2014	Dubai Open	United Arab Emirates	1st	Kumite cadets
2015	Dubai Open	United Arab Emirates	2nd	Kumites cadets - 63 kg
2015	Grand Prix	Czech Republic	1st	Kumite junior - 61 kg
2015	Grand Prix	Czech Republic	3rd	Kumite junior - 61 kg
2015	Grand Prix	Czech Republic	3rd	Kumite team junior
2015	Turkey Open	Turkey	1st	Kumite junior - 61 kg
2015	Mediterranean Championship	Egypt	2nd	Kumite junior - 61 kg
2016	Dubai Open	United Arab Emirates	2nd	Kumite team junior
2016	Dubai Open	United Arab Emirates	2nd	Kumite junior - 61 kg
2017	World Championship	Spain	2nd	Kumite U21 - 67 kg
2019	African Championship zone 1	Morocco	3rd	Kumite U21 - 67 kg
2019	Arab Championship	Tunisia	2nd	Kumite U21 - 67 kg
2019	Arab Club Championship	Egypt	1st	Kumite team senior
2019	World championship	Chile	3rd	Kumite U21 - 60 kg
2022	Series A	Egypt	3rd	Kumite senior - 67 kg
2022	Series A	Turkey	1st	Kumite senior - 67 kg
