= Judo at the 2023 African Games =

Judo competition

Judo Judo at the 2023 African Games
- Venue: Ga-Mashiae Hall
- Location: Accra, Ghana
- Dates: 12–15 March 2024
- Competitors: 228 from 37 nations
- Website: Official website

Competition at external databases
- Links: IJF • JudoInside

The judo events at the 2023 African Games will be held in Accra, Ghana from 12 to 15 March 2024. It will mark the 13th edition of Judo at the African Games. The last day of competition will feature a mixed team event.

== Participating nations ==
- South Africa (8)

== Medal table ==
* Host nation (Ghana)

| Rank | Nation | Gold | Silver | Bronze | Total |
|---|---|---|---|---|---|
| 1 | Tunisia (TUN) | 6 | 4 | 6 | 16 |
| 2 | Algeria (ALG) | 2 | 3 | 1 | 6 |
| 3 | Senegal (SEN) | 1 | 2 | 1 | 4 |
| 4 | Egypt (EGY) | 1 | 1 | 7 | 9 |
| 5 | South Africa (RSA) | 1 | 0 | 3 | 4 |
| 6 | Independent Olympic Athletes (IOA) | 1 | 0 | 2 | 3 |
| 7 | Madagascar (MAD) | 1 | 0 | 1 | 2 |
| 7 | Zambia (ZAM) | 1 | 0 | 1 | 2 |
| 9 | Guinea (GUI) | 1 | 0 | 0 | 1 |
| 10 | Cameroon (CMR) | 0 | 3 | 2 | 5 |
| 11 | Ivory Coast (CIV) | 0 | 1 | 1 | 2 |
| 12 | Mauritius (MRI) | 0 | 1 | 0 | 1 |
| 13 | Central African Republic (CAF) | 0 | 0 | 2 | 2 |
| 14 | Djibouti (DJI) | 0 | 0 | 1 | 1 |
| 14 | Niger (NIG) | 0 | 0 | 1 | 1 |
| 14 | Nigeria (NGR) | 0 | 0 | 1 | 1 |
| Totals (16 entries) | | 15 | 15 | 30 | 60 |

== Medal summary ==
=== Men's events ===
| Event | Gold | Silver | Bronze |
|---|---|---|---|
| Extra-lightweight (−60 kg) | Leonardo Barros; Independent Olympic Athletes | Fraj Dhouibi; Tunisia | Adel Hamada; Egypt |
| Extra-lightweight (−60 kg) | Leonardo Barros; Independent Olympic Athletes | Fraj Dhouibi; Tunisia | Simon Zulu; Zambia |
| Half-lightweight (−66 kg) | Steven Mungandu; Zambia | Aziz Harbi; Tunisia | Jason Zacko Ngawili; Central African Republic |
| Half-lightweight (−66 kg) | Steven Mungandu; Zambia | Aziz Harbi; Tunisia | Kais Moudetere; Algeria |
| Lightweight (−73 kg) | Aleddine Ben Chalbi; Tunisia | Wail Ezzine; Algeria | Rodrigo Fernando; Independent Olympic Athletes |
| Lightweight (−73 kg) | Aleddine Ben Chalbi; Tunisia | Wail Ezzine; Algeria | Aden-Alexandre Houssein; Djibouti |
| Half-middleweight (−81 kg) | Abdelrahman Mohamed; Egypt | Omar Mahmoud; Egypt | Timothy Meuwsen; South Africa |
| Half-middleweight (−81 kg) | Abdelrahman Mohamed; Egypt | Omar Mahmoud; Egypt | Abdoul Kader Boubacar Adamou; Niger |
| Middleweight (−90 kg) | Abdelaziz Ben Ammar; Tunisia | Abderahmane Diao; Senegal | Yassine Kouraichi; Tunisia |
| Middleweight (−90 kg) | Abdelaziz Ben Ammar; Tunisia | Abderahmane Diao; Senegal | Ali Hazem; Egypt |
| Half-heavyweight (−100 kg) | Koussay Ben Ghares; Tunisia | Abdellah Fala; Algeria | Koffi Krémé Kobena; Ivory Coast |
| Half-heavyweight (−100 kg) | Koussay Ben Ghares; Tunisia | Abdellah Fala; Algeria | Karim Ibrahim; Egypt |
| Heavyweight (+100 kg) | Mohamed El Mehdi Lili; Algeria | Mbagnick Ndiaye; Senegal | Wahib Hdiouech; Tunisia |
| Heavyweight (+100 kg) | Mohamed El Mehdi Lili; Algeria | Mbagnick Ndiaye; Senegal | Mohamed Aborakia; Egypt |

=== Women's events ===
| Event | Gold | Silver | Bronze |
|---|---|---|---|
| Extra-lightweight (−48 kg) | Oumaima Bedioui; Tunisia | Priscilla Morand; Mauritius | Natacha Razafindrakalo; Madagascar |
| Extra-lightweight (−48 kg) | Oumaima Bedioui; Tunisia | Priscilla Morand; Mauritius | Geronay Whitebooi; South Africa |
| Half-lightweight (−52 kg) | Rahma Tibi; Tunisia | Marie Céline Baba Matia; Cameroon | Franca Audu; Nigeria |
| Half-lightweight (−52 kg) | Rahma Tibi; Tunisia | Marie Céline Baba Matia; Cameroon | Charné Griesel; South Africa |
| Lightweight (−57 kg) | Jasmine Martin; South Africa | Zouleiha Abzetta Dabonne; Ivory Coast | Chaima Sidaoui; Tunisia |
| Lightweight (−57 kg) | Jasmine Martin; South Africa | Zouleiha Abzetta Dabonne; Ivory Coast | Mariem Jmour; Tunisia |
| Half-middleweight (−63 kg) | Amina Belkadi; Algeria | Audrey Jeannette Etoua Biock; Cameroon | Nadia Guimendego; Central African Republic |
| Half-middleweight (−63 kg) | Amina Belkadi; Algeria | Audrey Jeannette Etoua Biock; Cameroon | Ons Romdhani; Tunisia |
| Middleweight (−70 kg) | Aina Laura Rasoanaivo Razafy; Madagascar | Zita Ornella Biami; Cameroon | Maram Jmour; Tunisia |
| Middleweight (−70 kg) | Aina Laura Rasoanaivo Razafy; Madagascar | Zita Ornella Biami; Cameroon | Farida Magdy; Egypt |
| Half-heavyweight (−78 kg) | Marie Branser; Guinea | Arij Akkab; Tunisia | Aya Gaballa; Egypt |
| Half-heavyweight (−78 kg) | Marie Branser; Guinea | Arij Akkab; Tunisia | Georgika Wesly Djengue Moune; Cameroon |
| Heavyweight (+78 kg) | Monica Sagna; Senegal | Sarra Mzougui; Tunisia | Georgette Sagna; Senegal |
| Heavyweight (+78 kg) | Monica Sagna; Senegal | Sarra Mzougui; Tunisia | Crislayn Rodrigues; Independent Olympic Athletes |

=== Mixed events ===
| Event | Gold | Silver | Bronze |
|---|---|---|---|
| Mixed team | Tunisia; Aziz Harbi; Aleddine Ben Chalbi; Abdelaziz Ben Ammar; Yassine Kouraichi; Koussay Ben Ghares; Wahib Hdiouech; Chaima Sidaoui; Mariem Jmour; Ons Romdhani; Maram Jmour; Sarra Mzougui; Zeineb Troudi | Algeria; Kais Moudetere; Wail Ezzine; Aghiles-Imad Benazoug; Abdelhamid Zmit; Mohamed El Mehdi Lili; Abdellah Fala; Faïza Aissahine; Zina Bouakache; Amina Belkadi; Dyhia Benchallal; Louiza Ichallal | Cameroon |
| Mixed team | Tunisia; Aziz Harbi; Aleddine Ben Chalbi; Abdelaziz Ben Ammar; Yassine Kouraichi; Koussay Ben Ghares; Wahib Hdiouech; Chaima Sidaoui; Mariem Jmour; Ons Romdhani; Maram Jmour; Sarra Mzougui; Zeineb Troudi | Algeria; Kais Moudetere; Wail Ezzine; Aghiles-Imad Benazoug; Abdelhamid Zmit; Mohamed El Mehdi Lili; Abdellah Fala; Faïza Aissahine; Zina Bouakache; Amina Belkadi; Dyhia Benchallal; Louiza Ichallal | Egypt; Adel Hamada; Karim Elhagar; Ali Hazem; Zeyad Ayman; Mohamed Aborakia; Hady Hussein; Tassnim Roshdy; Haneen Altaeb; Fatma Ghanem; Farida Magdy; Safa Soliman; Farah Sharaf |
