= Egypt Karate Federation =

Governing body of karate in Egypt

- Sport: Karate
- Jurisdiction: National
- Affiliation: World Karate Federation (WKF)
- Regional affiliation: Union of African Karate Federation

The Egypt Karate Federation is the national body for Karate in Egypt. It's the only association authorised to send Egyptian Karatekas to the Summer Olympics.

Egypt is one of the dominant forces in Sport karate in the world.
