= Wail Ezzine =

Algerian judoka (born 1996)

Personal information
- Born: 5 April 1996 (age 30)
- Occupation: Judoka

Sport
- Country: Algeria
- Sport: Judo
- Weight class: ‍–‍66 kg

Achievements and titles
- World Champ.: R16 (2021)
- African Champ.: (silver) (2017, 2021)
Medal record
Men's judo
Representing Algeria
African Games
Gold medal – first place	2019 Rabat	‍–‍66 kg
Silver medal – second place	2023 Accra	‍–‍73 kg
African Championships
Silver medal – second place	2017 Antananarivo	‍–‍66 kg
Silver medal – second place	2021 Dakar	‍–‍66 kg
African Junior Championships
Silver medal – second place	2015 Sharm El Sheikh	‍–‍66 kg

Profile at external databases
- IJF: 11233
- JudoInside.com: 90479
- Updated on 17 March 2024

Wail Ezzine (born 5 April 1996) is an Algerian judoka.

== Career ==
Ezzine won gold at the 2019 African Games in the ‍–‍66 kg event.

At the 2021 African Judo Championships held in Dakar, Senegal, Ezzine won the silver medal in the men's 66 kg event.

He competed at the 2021 World Judo Championships in the ‍–‍66 kg event.
