= Somalia at the 2023 African Games =

- Flag of Somalia
- IOC code: SOM
- NOC: Somali Olympic Committee

in Accra, Ghana 8 March 2024 – 23 March 2024
- Competitors: 1 in 1 sport
- Medals Ranked 37th: Gold 0 Silver 1 Bronze 0 Total 1

African Games appearances
- 1973; 1978–2007; 2011; 2015; 2019; 2023

Somalia competed at the 2023 African Games held from 8 to 23 March 2024 in Accra, Ghana. Somalia competed in 1 sports.

== Medal table ==
Medal	Name	Sport	Event	Date
Silver	Abdullahi Jama Mahamed	Athletics	Men's 5000 metres	22 March
