= Zimbabwe at the 2023 African Games =

- Flag of Zimbabwe
- IOC code: ZIM
- NOC: Zimbabwe Olympic Committee

in Accra, Ghana 8 March 2024 – 23 March 2024
- Medals Ranked 18th: Gold 3 Silver 4 Bronze 4 Total 11

African Games appearances (overview)
- 1987; 1991; 1995; 1999; 2003; 2007; 2011; 2015; 2019; 2023

Zimbabwe competed at the 2023 African Games held from 8 to 23 March 2024 in Accra, Ghana. Zimbabwe competed in 9 sports.

== Medal table ==
Medal	Name	Sport	Event	Date
Gold	Denilson Cyprianos	Swimming	Men's 200 metre backstroke	10 March
Gold	Zimbabwe	Cricket	Women's tournament	13 March
Gold	Zimbabwe	Cricket	Men's tournament	23 March
Silver	Denilson Cyprianos	Swimming	Men's 100 metre backstroke	12 March
Silver	Zimbabwe	Rugby sevens	Men's tournament	21 March
Silver	Benjamin Lock; Courtney John Lock	Tennis	Men's doubles	21 March
Silver	Benjamin Lock	Tennis	Men's singles	21 March
Bronze	Donata Katai	Swimming	Women's 100 metre backstroke	12 March
Bronze	Paige van der Westhuizen; Donata Katai; Mikayla Makwabarara; Vhenekai Dhemba	Swimming	Women's 4 × 100 metre freestyle relay	12 March
Bronze	Ashley Kamangirira	Athletics	Women's 100 metres hurdles	20 March
Bronze	Isaac Mpofu	Athletics	Men's half marathon	22 March

== Cricket ==
=== Men's ===
Team roster

The squad was announced on 4 March 2024.

- Clive Madande (c, wk)
- Brian Bennett
- Johnathan Campbell
- Takudzwa Chataira
- Alex Falao
- Trevor Gwandu
- Kudakwashe Macheka
- Tadiwanashe Marumani
- Wallace Mubaiwa
- Ashley Mufandauya
- Tony Munyonga
- Rodney Mupdudza
- Tashinga Musekiwa
- Owen Muzondo
- Nick Welch

Group play

Pos	Team	Pld	W	L	T	NR	Pts	NRR	Qualification
1	Zimbabwe Emerging	3	3	0	0	0	6	1.600	Advanced to knockout stage
2	Namibia	3	1	2	0	0	2	0.195	Advanced to knockout stage
3	Tanzania	3	1	2	0	0	2	−0.220	
4	Nigeria	3	1	2	0	0	2	−1.158	

Source: ESPNcricinfo

17 March 2024
09:30
Scorecard

Tanzania; 131/6 (20 overs)	v	Nigeria; 84 (18.3 overs)
Ivan Selemani 33 (34); Joshua Asia 3/18 (4 overs)		Sesan Adedeji 25 (33); Salum Jumbe 5/10 (3.3 overs)

Tanzania won by 47 runs
Achimota Oval B, Accra
Umpires: Sarah Dambanevana (Zim) and Percival Sizara (Zim)
Player of the match: Salum Jumbe (Tan)

- Tanzania won the toss and elected to bat.
- Salum Jumbe (Tan) took his first five-wicket haul in T20Is.

18 March 2024
09:30
Scorecard

Namibia; 121/7 (20 overs)	v	Nigeria; 126/7 (20 overs)
Dylan Leicher 42* (41); Isaac Danladi 2/10 (4 overs)		Isaac Danladi 28 (21); Jan Nicol Loftie-Eaton 3/20 (4 overs)

Nigeria won by 3 wickets
Achimota Oval B, Accra
Umpires: Iknow Chabi (Zim) and Patric Makumbi (Uga)
Player of the match: Isaac Danladi (Nga)

- Namibia won the toss and elected to bat.
- Jan Balt, Simon Shikongo and Gerhard Janse van Rensburg (Nam) all made their T20I debuts.

20 March 2024
13:50
Scorecard

Nigeria; 88 (17.4 overs)	v	Zimbabwe Emerging; 91/0 (16 overs)
Vincent Adewoye 19* (15); Owen Muzondo 3/11 (4 overs)		Tadiwanashe Marumani 47* (44)

Zimbabwe Emerging won by 10 wickets
Achimota Oval A, Accra
Umpires: Patric Makumbi (Uga) and Isaac Oyieko (Ken)
Player of the match: Owen Muzondo (Zim)

- Nigeria won the toss and elected to bat.

=== Women's ===
Team roster

The squad was announced on 4 March 2024.

- Mary-Anne Musonda (c)
- Kudzai Chigora
- Francisca Chipare
- Chiedza Dhururu (wk)
- Nyasha Gwanzura
- Lindokuhle Mabhero
- Precious Marange
- Sharne Mayers
- Audrey Mazvishaya
- Pellagia Mujaji
- Modester Mupachikwa
- Kelis Ndhlovu
- Josephine Nkomo
- Nomvelo Sibanda
- Loreen Tshuma

Group play

Pos	Team	Pld	W	L	T	NR	Pts	NRR	Qualification
1	Zimbabwe	3	3	0	0	0	6	1.438	Advanced to the knockout stage
2	Uganda	3	2	1	0	0	4	0.529	Advanced to the knockout stage
3	Kenya	3	1	2	0	0	2	−1.018	
4	Rwanda	3	0	3	0	0	0	−0.975	

Source: ESPNcricinfo

7 March 2024
13:45
Scorecard

Rwanda; 72/7 (14 overs)	v	Zimbabwe; 75/3 (13.4 overs)
Gisele Ishimwe 22 (28); Precious Marange 2/8 (3 overs)		Modester Mupachikwa 38 (38); Alice Ikuzwe 1/4 (1 overs)

Zimbabwe won by 7 wickets
Achimota Oval A, Accra
Umpires: Habib Enesi (Nga) and Isaac Oyieko (Ken)
Player of the match: Modester Mupachikwa (Zim)

- Rwanda won the toss and elected to bat.
- The match was reduced to 14 overs per side due to rain.

8 March 2024
13:50
Scorecard

Uganda; 72 (20 overs)	v	Zimbabwe; 75/6 (19.4 overs)
Immaculate Nakisuuyi 17 (40); Josephine Nkomo 3/9 (4 overs)		Sharne Mayers 19 (26); Immaculate Nakisuuyi 2/10 (3 overs)

Zimbabwe won by 4 wickets
Achimota Oval A, Accra
Umpires: Adil Kassam (Tan) and Isaac Oyieko (Ken)
Player of the match: Josephine Nkomo (Zim)

- Zimbabwe won the toss and elected to field.

10 March 2024
13:15
Scorecard

Zimbabwe; 142/5 (20 overs)	v	Kenya; 74/4 (20 overs)
Modester Mupachikwa 40 (40); Flavia Odhiambo 3/29 (4 overs)		Melvin Khagoitsa 30 (47); Precious Marange 1/5 (2 overs)

Zimbabwe won by 68 runs
Achimota Oval A, Accra
Umpires: Adil Kassam (Tan) and Patric Makumbi (Uga)
Player of the match: Modester Mupachikwa (Zim)

- Kenya won the toss and elected to field.

Semi-finals

11 March 2024
13:50
Scorecard

Nigeria; 74/9 (20 overs)	v	Zimbabwe; 75/5 (16 overs)
Lucky Piety 13 (14); Kelis Ndhlovu 3/12 (4 overs)		Modester Mupachikwa 26 (43); Peculiar Agboya 2/12 (4 overs)

Zimbabwe won by 5 wickets
Achimota Oval A, Accra
Umpires: Stacy Lackay (SA) and Isaac Oyieko (Ken)
Player of the match: Kelis Ndhlovu (Zim)

- Nigeria won the toss and elected to bat.

Gold medal match

13 March 2024
13:50
Scorecard

Zimbabwe; 112/5 (20 overs)	v	South Africa Emerging; 112/8 (20 overs)
Modester Mupachikwa 31 (49); Nondumiso Shangase 1/9 (2 overs)		Miane Smit 31* (32); Kelis Ndhlovu 2/21 (3 overs)

Match tied (Zimbabwe won the Super Over)
Achimota Oval A, Accra
Umpires: Patric Makumbi (Uga) and Isaac Oyieko (Ken)
Player of the match: Kelis Ndhlovu (Zim)

- South Africa Emerging won the toss and elected to field.
- Super Over: South Africa 2/2, Zimbabwe 4/0.

== Judo ==
3 athletes were scheduled to compete in athletes.
