= Equatorial Guinea at the 2023 African Games =

- Flag of Equatorial Guinea
- IOC code: GEQ
- NOC: Olympic Committee of Equatorial Guinea

in Accra, Ghana 8 March 2024 – 23 March 2024
- Competitors: 35 in 8 sports
- Medals Ranked 37th: Gold 0 Silver 1 Bronze 0 Total 1

African Games appearances
- 2011; 2015; 2019; 2023

Equatorial Guinea competed at the 2023 African Games held from 8 to 23 March 2024 in Accra, Ghana. Equatorial Guinea competed in 8 sports.

== Medal table ==
Medal	Name	Sport	Event	Date
Silver	Yann Mansogo Ada	Boxing	Men's +92 kg	22 March
