= Lina Nassr =

Algerian chess player (born 2003)

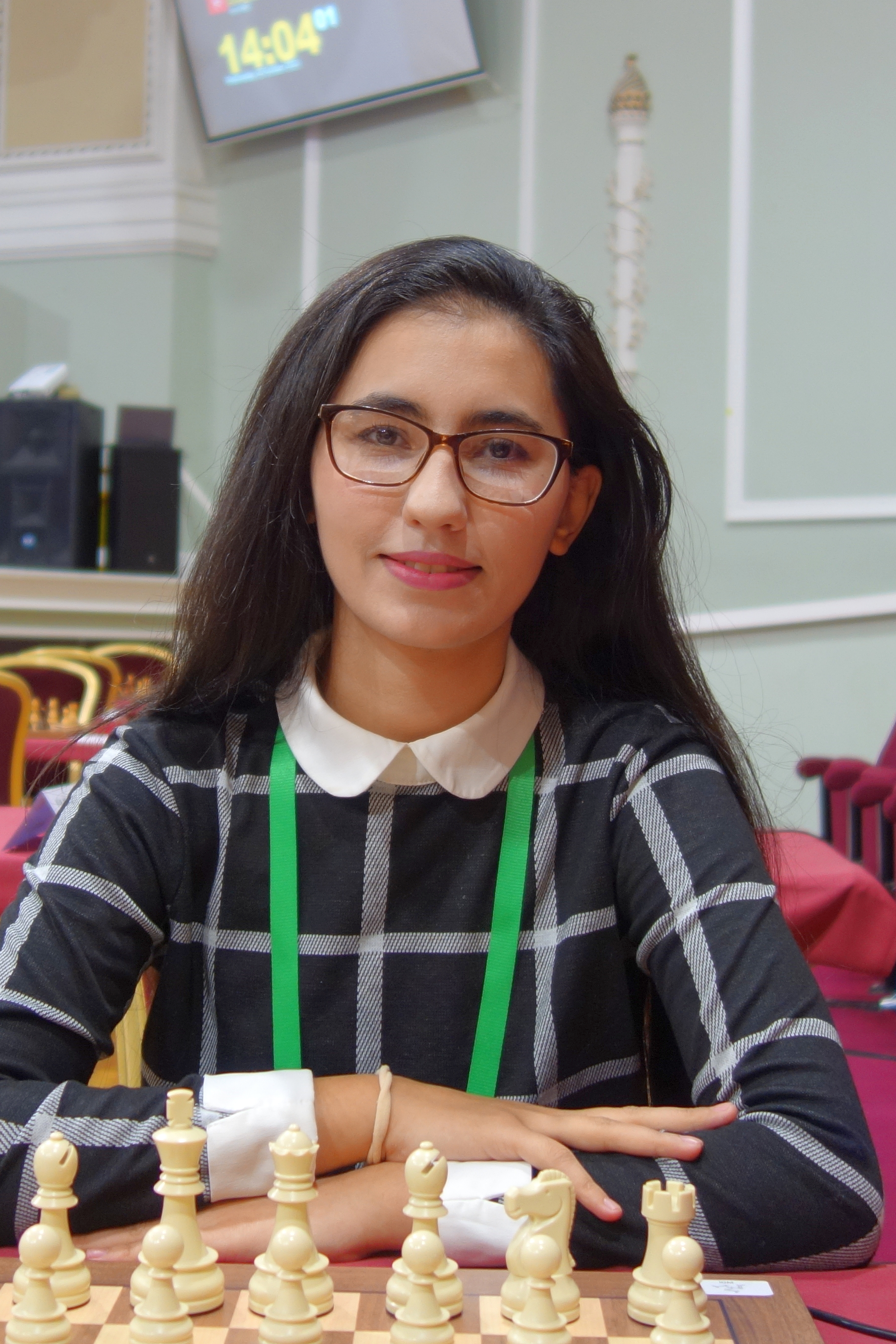
- Lina Nassr at the FIDE Grand Swiss 2023

Personal information
- Born: 2003 (age 22–23)

Chess career
- Country: Algeria
- Title: Woman International Master (2018)
- Peak rating: 2080 (March 2024)

Lina Nassr (born 2003) is an Algerian chess player who holds the title of Woman International Master (2018).

== Chess career ==
Nassr is a three-time winner of the African Junior Chess Championship (2017, 2021 and 2022).

Nassr represented Algeria in the 2018 Chess Olympiad, finishing on 3.5/6 on board five, and the 2022 Chess Olympiad (6.5/11 on board two).

She also won the women's section of the Arab Chess Championship in 2023, finishing on 7.5/9.

Nassr won the women's section of the 2023 African Chess Championship, finishing on 7.5/9, and qualifying for the Women's Chess World Cup 2023, where she was defeated by Sophie Milliet in the first round.
