= Mozambique at the 2023 African Games =

- Flag of Mozambique
- IOC code: MOZ
- NOC: National Olympic Committee of Mozambique

in Accra, Ghana 8 March 2024 – 23 March 2024
- Competitors: 33 in 8 sports
- Medals Ranked 31st: Gold 0 Silver 5 Bronze 1 Total 6

African Games appearances
- 1987; 1991; 1995; 1999; 2003; 2007; 2011; 2015; 2019; 2023

Mozambique competed at the 2023 African Games held from 8 to 23 March 2024 in Accra, Ghana. Mozambique competed in 8 sports.

== Medal table ==
Medal	Name	Sport	Event	Date
Silver	Donaldo Paiva	Chess	Men's rapid individual	10 March
Silver	Ana Sinaportar; Vanessa Muianga	Beach volleyball	Women's tournament	14 March
Silver	Armando Sigauque	Boxing	Men's 57 kg	22 March
Silver	Isabel Mulungo	Boxing	Women's 66 kg	22 March
Silver	Alcinda Dos Santos	Boxing	Women's 70 kg	22 March
Bronze	Rady Gramane	Boxing	Women's 75 kg	22 March
