= Kenya at the 2023 African Games =

- Flag of Kenya
- IOC code: KEN
- NOC: National Olympic Committee of Kenya

in Accra, Ghana 8 March 2024 – 23 March 2024
- Medals Ranked 10th: Gold 8 Silver 8 Bronze 21 Total 37

African Games appearances (overview)
- 1965; 1973; 1978; 1987; 1991; 1995; 1999; 2003; 2007; 2011; 2015; 2019; 2023

Kenya competed at the 2023 African Games held from 8 to 23 March 2024 in Accra, Ghana.

== Medal table ==
Medal	Name	Sport	Event	Date
Gold	Aaron Cheminingwa	Athletics	Men's 800 metres	20 March
Gold	Emily Wamusyi Ngii	Athletics	Women's 20 kilometres walk	20 March
Gold	Beatrice Chepkoech	Athletics	Women's 3000 metres steeplechase	20 March
Gold	Mary Moraa	Athletics	Women's 400 metres	20 March
Gold	Janeth Chepngetich	Athletics	Women's 10000 metres	21 March
Gold	Angella Okutoyi	Tennis	Women's singles	21 March
Gold	Brian Komen	Athletics	Men's 1500 metres	22 March
Gold	Edwin Owuor	Boxing	Men's 75 kg	22 March
Silver	Amos Serem	Athletics	Men's 3000 metres steeplechase	18 March
Silver	Edwin Kimutai	Athletics	Men's decathlon	19 March
Silver	Winny Bii	Athletics	Women's triple jump	19 March
Silver	Samuel Gathimba	Athletics	Men's 20 kilometres walk	20 March
Silver	Ngeno Kipngetich	Athletics	Men's 800 metres	20 March
Silver	Angella Okutoyi; Cynthia Wanjala	Tennis	Women's doubles	21 March
Silver	Julius Yego	Athletics	Men's javelin throw	22 March
Silver	Kenya	Volleyball	Men's tournament	23 March
Bronze	Esther Kavesa	Weightlifting	Women's 45 kg total	10 March
Bronze	Esther Kavesa	Weightlifting	Women's 45 kg snatch	10 March
Bronze	Juliana Anyango	Weightlifting	Women's 81 kg total	13 March
Bronze	Juliana Anyango	Weightlifting	Women's 81 kg snatch	13 March
Bronze	Juliana Anyango	Weightlifting	Women's 81 kg clean & jerk	13 March
Bronze	Faith Ogallo	Taekwondo	Women's +73 kg	17 March
Bronze	Simon Koech	Athletics	Men's 3000 metres steeplechase	18 March
Bronze	Jully Musangi	Taekwondo	Women's −73 kg	18 March
Bronze	Evans Kiptum	Athletics	Men's 10000 metres	19 March
Bronze	Vivian Chebet Kiprotich	Athletics	Women's 800 metres	19 March
Bronze	David Kapirante; Kennedy Muthoki; Mary Moraa; Mourine Thomas	Athletics	Mixed 4 × 400 metres relay	19 March
Bronze	Kenya	Rugby sevens	Men's tournament	21 March
Bronze	Abel Kipsang	Athletics	Men's 1500 metres	22 March
Bronze	Cornelius Kemboi	Athletics	Men's 5000 metres	22 March
Bronze	Mary Ekiru	Athletics	Women's 1500 metres	22 March
Bronze	Nancy Chepleting	Athletics	Women's half marathon	22 March
Bronze	Amina Faki	Boxing	Women's 54 kg	22 March
Bronze	Kenya	Field hockey	Women's tournament	22 March
Bronze	Mary Muriu	Taekwondo	Women's under 30	22 March
Bronze	Milka Akinyi	Taekwondo	Women's under 40	22 March
Bronze	Kenya	Volleyball	Women's tournament	23 March

== Cricket ==
=== Men's ===
Group play

Pos	Team	Pld	W	L	T	NR	Pts	NRR	Qualification
1	Uganda	3	3	0	0	0	6	3.283	Advanced to the knockout stage
2	Kenya	3	2	1	0	0	4	1.049	Advanced to the knockout stage
3	University Sports South Africa	3	1	2	0	0	2	1.000	
4	Ghana	3	0	3	0	0	0	−5.888	

Source: ESPNcricinfo

17 March 2024
13:50
Scorecard

Uganda; 169/7 (20 overs)	v	Kenya; 97 (16.4 overs)
Roger Mukasa 59 (45); Lucas Oluoch 5/20 (4 overs)		Rakep Patel 42 (35); Alpesh Ramjani 4/17 (3.4 overs)

Uganda won by 72 runs
Achimota Oval B, Accra
Umpires: Iknow Chabi (Zim) and Habib Enesi (Nga)
Player of the match: Dinesh Nakrani (Uga)

- Uganda won the toss and elected to bat.
- Lucas Oluoch (Ken) took his first five-wicket haul in T20Is.
- Roger Mukasa (Uga) scored his 1,000th run in T20Is.

18 March 2024
13:50
Scorecard

Kenya; 141/6 (20 overs)	v	University Sports South Africa; 71 (15 overs)
Collins Obuya 58 (47); Heinrigh Pieterse 2/23 (4 overs)		George Van Heerden 22 (22); Aarnav Patel 5/15 (3 overs)

Kenya won by 70 runs
Achimota Oval A, Accra
Umpires: Adil Kassam (Tan) and Percival Sizara (Zim)
Player of the match: Aarnav Patel (Ken)

- Kenya won the toss and elected to bat.

20 March 2024
09:30
Scorecard

Ghana; 111 (18.3 overs)	v	Kenya; 115/3 (11.1 overs)
Obed Harvey 33 (33); Rakep Patel 3/12 (4 overs)		Collins Obuya 68 (30); Richmond Baaleri 3/55 (4 overs)

Kenya won by 7 wickets
Achimota Oval B, Accra
Umpires: Habib Enesi (Nga) and Adil Kassam (Tan)
Player of the match: Collins Obuya (Ken)

- Ghana won the toss and elected to bat.
- Aarnav Patel (Ken) made his T20I debut.

=== Women's ===
Group play

Pos	Team	Pld	W	L	T	NR	Pts	NRR	Qualification
1	Zimbabwe	3	3	0	0	0	6	1.438	Advanced to the knockout stage
2	Uganda	3	2	1	0	0	4	0.529	Advanced to the knockout stage
3	Kenya	3	1	2	0	0	2	−1.018	
4	Rwanda	3	0	3	0	0	0	−0.975	

Source: ESPNcricinfo

7 March 2024
13:15
Scorecard

Kenya; 63/8 (17 overs)	v	Uganda; 66/4 (16.4 overs)
Melvin Khagoitsa 24 (37); Immaculate Nakisuuyi 2/17 (4 overs)		Gloria Obukor 29* (48); Esther Wachira 1/9 (3 overs)

Uganda won by 6 wickets
Achimota Oval B, Accra
Umpires: Stacy Lackay (SA) and Percival Sizara (Zim)
Player of the match: Immaculate Nakisuuyi (Uga)

- Uganda won the toss and elected to field.
- The match was reduced to 17 overs per side due to rain.

8 March 2024
13:45
Scorecard

Rwanda; 69 (18.3 overs)	v	Kenya; 72/3 (17 overs)
Clarisse Uwase 24 (28); Jemimah Ndanu 3/21 (4 overs)		Esther Wachira 42* (49); Rosine Irera 2/11 (4 overs)

Kenya won by 7 wickets
Achimota Oval B, Accra
Umpires: Iknow Chabi (Zim) and Patric Makumbi (Uga)
Player of the match: Esther Wachira (Ken)

- Rwanda won the toss and elected to bat.

10 March 2024
13:15
Scorecard

Zimbabwe; 142/5 (20 overs)	v	Kenya; 74/4 (20 overs)
Modester Mupachikwa 40 (40); Flavia Odhiambo 3/29 (4 overs)		Melvin Khagoitsa 30 (47); Precious Marange 1/5 (2 overs)

Zimbabwe won by 68 runs
Achimota Oval A, Accra
Umpires: Adil Kassam (Tan) and Patric Makumbi (Uga)
Player of the match: Modester Mupachikwa (Zim)

- Kenya won the toss and elected to field.

== Field Hockey ==
Summary

Key:

- FT – After full-time.
- P – Match decided by penalty-shootout.

Team	Event	Group stage				Final / BM	
Team	Event	Opposition Score	Opposition Score	Opposition Score	Rank	Opposition Score	Rank
Kenya men's	Men's tournament	Egypt; L 3–2	Ghana; L 3–1	Nigeria; L 1–2	4	Nigeria; L 1–2	4
Kenya women's	Women's tournament	Ghana; L 1–4	bye	Nigeria; L 0–1	3	Did not advance	

=== Men's ===
Group play

Pos	Team	Pld	W	D	L	GF	GA	GD	Pts	Qualification
1	Egypt	3	3	0	0	9	6	+3	9	Final
2	Ghana (H)	3	2	0	1	4	2	+2	6	Final
3	Nigeria	3	1	0	2	6	7	−1	3	Third place match
4	Kenya	3	0	0	3	4	8	−4	0	Third place match

Source: FIH
Rules for classification: 1) points; 2) matches won; 3) goal difference; 4) goals for; 5) head-to-head result; 6) field goals scored.
(H) Hosts

17 March 2024
16:00

Kenya	2–3	Egypt
Wakhura 23'; Ademba 59'	Report	Adel 17'; Ragab 41'; El-Ganaini 47'

Umpires:
Nortey Ebenezer (GHA)
Simon Awasa (NGR)

18 March 2024
16:00

Kenya	1–3	Ghana
Wiswa 59'	Report	Fialor 38'; Addison 43'; Ntiamoah 45'

Umpires:
Mohamed Hassan (EGY)
Simon Awasa (NGR)

20 March 2024
14:00

Nigeria	2–1	Kenya
Samaila 15', 21'	Report	Masambu 7'

Umpires:
Nortey Ebenezer (GHA)
Mohamed Hassan (EGY)

Third and fourth place

22 March 2024
14:00

Nigeria	2–1	Kenya
Samaila 33'; John 43'	Report	Kariuki 53'

Umpires:
Mohamed Hassan (EGY)
Nortey Ebenezer (GHA)

=== Women's ===
Group play

Pos	Team	Pld	W	D	L	GF	GA	GD	Pts	Qualification
1	Ghana (H)	2	2	0	0	5	1	+4	6	Final
2	Nigeria	2	1	0	1	1	1	0	3	Final
3	Kenya	2	0	0	2	1	5	−4	0	

Source: FIH
Rules for classification: 1) points; 2) matches won; 3) goal difference; 4) goals for; 5) head-to-head result; 6) field goals scored.
(H) Hosts

17 March 2024
10:00

Kenya	1–4	Ghana
Onyango 56'	Report	Opoku 9', 33'; Berko 19'; Narkuor 27'

Umpires:
Kamile Mockaitytė (LTU)
Charity Onosimuan (NGR)

20 March 2024
10:00

Nigeria	1–0	Kenya
Njoku 60'	Report

Umpires:
Kamile Mockaitytė (LTU)
Evelyn Fiador (GHA)
