= Field hockey at the 2023 African Games – Men's tournament =

Men's field hockey at the 2023 African Games
Tournament details
- Host country: Ghana
- City: Accra
- Dates: 17 March 2024–22 March 2024
- Teams: 4 (from 1 confederation)
- Venue: Theodosia Okoh Hockey Stadium

Final positions
- Champions: Egypt (3rd title)
- Runner-up: Ghana
- Third place: Nigeria

Tournament statistics
- Matches played: 8
- Goals scored: 30 (3.75 per match)
- Top scorer(s): (Egypt) Ahmed El-Ganaini (Nigeria) James Samaila (5 goals)

Field Hockey was among the sports at the 13th Africa Games held in 8 to 23 March 2023 in Accra, Ghana.

Egypt won the final on penalties against the hosts Ghana after a 2–2 score-line at the end of regular time. Nigeria won the third-place playoff against Kenya (2–1).

== Competition schedule ==
In the preliminary round, games will be played on two pitches.

G	Group stage	B	Bronze medal match	F	Final

Sun 17	Mon 18	Tue 19	Wed 20	Thu 21	Fri 22	
G	G		G		B	F

== Participating nations ==
5 teams were scheduled to compete in field hockey.

Egypt

The squad was announced on 12 March 2024.

Head Coach: (Pakistan) Tahir Zaman

3. Mostafa Mansour
7. Ahmed Mohsen
9. Amr Sayed (C)
10. Ashraf Said
11. Ahmed El-Naggar
12. Mohamed Ragab
13. Mahmoud Mamdouh
14. Karim Atef
15. Moustafa Tarek
16. Mahmoud Hussin (GK)
17. Hussein Awad
18. Ziad Adel
21. Ahmed El-Ganaini
22. Mohamed Adel
24. Basel Abdelmonem
27. Mohamed Ali
30. Hossameldin Ragab
32. Mohamed Hemid (GK)
Ghana

The squad was announced on 14 March 2024.

Head Coach: Salya Nsalbini

2. Joshua Pepperah
4. Charles Abbiw (C)
5. Stephen Asamoah
7. Derrick Fialor
8. Emmanuel Ankomah
9. Richard Adjei
10. Abdellah Addison
11. Francis Tettey
12. Samuel Agbeli
13. Emmanuel Akaba
15. Ernest Opoku
18. Benjamin Kwofie
19. Alfred Ntiamoah
20. Matthew Damalie
24. Luke Damalie
26. Benjamin Acquah (GK)
28. Malik Abdul
30. Eugene Acheampong (GK)
Kenya

Head Coach: Willys Otieno

1. Festus Onyango
2. Joshua Omondi (GK)
3. Moses Loise
4. Sutcliffe Usagi
6. Constant Wakhura (C)
7. Bethuel Masambu
8. Ivan Ludiali
10. Francis Kariuki
11. Cliffe Omari
12. George Mutria
13. Moses Ademba
15. Robert Masibo
18. James Muthii
20. Samuel Silong (GK)
25. Emmanuel Wiswa
30. Derick Henry
32. Kennedy Mango
42. Mathias Omwaka
Nigeria

The squad was announced on 12 March 2024.

Head coach:Baba Ndana

1. Haruna Yohanna (GK)
3. Christopher Joseph
4. Olawale Ajibua
5. Joseph Adamu
6. James Samaila
7. Kish Victor
8. Michael John (C)
9. Sunday Godwin
10. Muiz Bello
11. Kelvin Linus
12. Peter John
13. Dennis Solomon
14. Elkana Ibrahim
15. Olayinka Jayeoba
16. Endurance Nzete
17. Isaac Patrick
19. Benjamin Ibrahim
22. Mustapha Abdullahi (GK)
~~South Africa~~

== Group stage ==
All times are local (UTC)

The pools were announced on 22 February 2024.

Pos	Team	Pld	W	D	L	GF	GA	GD	Pts	Qualification
1	Egypt	3	3	0	0	9	6	+3	9	Final
2	Ghana (H)	3	2	0	1	4	2	+2	6	Final
3	Nigeria	3	1	0	2	6	7	−1	3	Third place match
4	Kenya	3	0	0	3	4	8	−4	0	Third place match

Source: FIH
Rules for classification: 1) points; 2) matches won; 3) goal difference; 4) goals for; 5) head-to-head result; 6) field goals scored.
(H) Hosts

17 March 2024
14:00

Ghana	1–0	Nigeria
Damalie 58'	Report

Umpires:
Deepak Joshi (IND)
Haroon Rashid (PAK)

17 March 2024
16:00

Kenya	2–3	Egypt
Wakhura 23'; Ademba 59'	Report	Adel 17'; Ragab 41'; El-Ganaini 47'

Umpires:
Nortey Ebenezer (GHA)
Simon Awasa (NGR)

18 March 2024
10:00

Egypt	5–4	Nigeria
El-Ganaini 17', 36'; Ragab 29'; Sayed 32'; Mamdouh 51'	Report	Samaila 21', 30'; Victor 32', 49'

Umpires:
Deepak Joshi (IND)
Nortey Ebenezer (GHA)

18 March 2024
16:00

Kenya	1–3	Ghana
Wiswa 59'	Report	Fialor 38'; Addison 43'; Ntiamoah 45'

Umpires:
Mohamed Hassan (EGY)
Simon Awasa (NGR)

20 March 2024
14:00

Nigeria	2–1	Kenya
Samaila 15', 21'	Report	Masambu 7'

Umpires:
Nortey Ebenezer (GHA)
Mohamed Hassan (EGY)

20 March 2024
16:00

Ghana	0–1	Egypt
	Report	El-Ganaini 41'

Umpires:
Simon Awasa (NGR)
Deepak Joshi (IND)

== First to fourth place classification ==
=== Third and fourth place ===
22 March 2024
14:00

Nigeria	2–1	Kenya
Samaila 33'; John 43'	Report	Kariuki 53'

Umpires:
Mohamed Hassan (EGY)
Nortey Ebenezer (GHA)

=== Final ===
22 March 2024
16:00

Egypt	2–2	Ghana
El-Ganaini 15'; Adel 26'	Report	Ntiamoah 44'; Tettey 57'
Penalties
Ragab (penalty shoot-out missed); Mansour (penalty shoot-out missed); El-Ganaini (penalty shoot-out scored); Adel (penalty shoot-out scored); Said (penalty shoot-out scored)	3–1	(penalty shoot-out missed) Kwofie; (penalty shoot-out missed) Agbeli; (penalty shoot-out missed) Ntiamoah; (penalty shoot-out scored) Ankomah; (penalty shoot-out missed) Adjei

Umpires:
Simon Awasa (NGR)
Deepak Joshi (IND)

== Statistics ==
=== Final standings ===
Pos	Team
1st place, gold medalist(s)	Egypt
2nd place, silver medalist(s)	Ghana (H)
3rd place, bronze medalist(s)	Nigeria
4	Kenya

Source: FIH
(H) Host

=== Goalscorers ===
There were 30 goals scored in 8 matches, for an average of 3.75 goals per match.

5 goals

- (Egypt) Ahmed El-Ganaini
- (Nigeria) James Samaila

2 goals

- (Egypt) Hossameldin Ragab
- (Ghana) Alfred Ntiamoah
- (Nigeria) Kish Victor

1 goal

- (Egypt) Mohamed Adel
- (Egypt) Ziad Adel
- (Egypt) Mahmoud Mamdouh
- (Egypt) Amr Sayed
- (Ghana) Abdellah Addison
- (Ghana) Luke Damalie
- (Ghana) Derrick Fialor
- (Ghana) Francis Tettey
- (Kenya) Moses Ademba
- (Kenya) Francis Kariuki
- (Kenya) Bethuel Masambu
- (Kenya) Constant Wakhura
- (Kenya) Emmanuel Wiswa
- (Nigeria) Peter John

Source: FIH
