= 2024 African Championships in Athletics – Women's 100 metres =

Women's 100 metres at the 2024 African Championships in Athletics
- Venue: Japoma Stadium
- Location: Douala, Cameroon
- Dates: 21 June (heats); 22 June (semi-finals & final)
- Competitors: 51 from 29 nations
- Winning time: 11.14

Medalists
gold medal	Gina Bass-Bittaye	Gambia
silver medal	Maia McCoy	Liberia
bronze medal	Maboundou Koné	Ivory Coast

The women's 100 metres event at the 2024 African Championships in Athletics was held on 21 and 22 June in Douala, Cameroon.

== Records ==
Records before the 2024 African Athletics Championships
Record	Athlete (nation)	Time (s)	Location	Date
World record	Florence Griffith Joyner (USA)	10.49	Indianapolis, United States	16 July 1988
African record	Marie Josée Ta Lou (CIV)	10.72	Fontvieille, Monaco	10 August 2022
Championship record	Murielle Ahouré (CIV)	10.99	Durban, South Africa	23 June 2016
World leading	Jacious Sears (USA)	10.77	Gainesville, United States	13 April 2024
African leading	Rosemary Chukwuma (NGR)	10.88	Fayetteville, United States	25 May 2024

== Results ==
=== Heats ===
Held on 21 June

Qualification: First 2 of each heat (Q) and the next 8 fastest (q) qualified for the semifinals.

Wind:
Heat 1: +1.0 m/s, Heat 2: +2.0 m/s, Heat 3: +1.1 m/s, Heat 4: +2.0 m/s, Heat 5: +1.2 m/s, Heat 6: +1.1 m/s, Heat 7: +2.1 m/s, Heat 8: +2.1 m/s

Rank	Heat	Name	Nationality	Time	Notes
1	1	Marie Josée Ta Lou-Smith	Ivory Coast	11.13	Q
2	2	Favour Ofili	Nigeria	11.22	Q
3	1	Rosemary Chukwuma	Nigeria	11.32	Q
4	2	Destiny Smith-Barnett	Liberia	11.43	Q
5	3	Gina Bass-Bittaye	Gambia	11.44	Q
5	5	Maboundou Koné	Ivory Coast	11.44	Q
7	6	Tsaone Sebele	Botswana	11.47	Q
8	1	Asimenye Simwaka	Malawi	11.51	q, NR
9	7	Claudine Njarasoa	Madagascar	11.54	Q
10	7	Pierrick-Linda Moulin	Gabon	11.60	Q
11	7	Maia McCoy	Liberia	11.63	q
12	8	Olayinka Olajide	Nigeria	11.68	Q
13	2	Gorete Semedo	São Tomé and Príncipe	11.70	q
14	7	Halutie Hor	Ghana	11.71	q
15	7	Tamzin Thomas	South Africa	11.75	q
16	4	Esther Mbagari	Kenya	11.77	Q
17	1	Bongiwe Mahlalela	Eswatini	11.82	q
18	5	Sadé Amor de Sousa	Namibia	11.83	Q
19	8	Viwe Jingqi	South Africa	11.87	Q
20	4	Lou Chantal Djehi	Ivory Coast	11.90	Q
21	3	Deborah Acheampong	Ghana	11.92	Q
22	4	Herverge Kole Etame	Cameroon	11.94	q
23	6	Christine Mboma	Namibia	11.97	Q
24	5	Téclaire Iris Mikal	Ghana	11.99	q
25	5	Sethunya Majama	Botswana	12.02	R
26	3	Oceanne Moirt	Mauritius	12.03	
27	2	Ndawana Haitembu	Namibia	12.09	
28	6	Monicah Safania	Kenya	12.15	
29	2	Refilwe Murangi	Botswana	12.19	
29	6	Natasha Chetty	Seychelles	12.19	
31	2	Madina Touré	Burkina Faso	12.21	
32	4	Batula Alyu	Ethiopia	12.23	
33	4	Elizabeth Msipa	Zimbabwe	12.28	
34	4	Amelie Anthony	Mauritius	12.30	
35	5	Merveille Imboula Gavouka	Republic of the Congo	12.34	
36	7	Fréjus Hanie Taty Mbikou	Republic of the Congo	12.38	
37	3	Georgiana Sesay	Sierra Leone	12.43	
38	8	Eunice Kadogo	Kenya	12.48	
39	8	Naomi Akakpo	Togo	12.58	
40	8	Elsiane Adjinda	Benin	12.62	
41	1	Rahel Tesfaye	Ethiopia	12.64	
42	1	Latifatou Millongo	Burkina Faso	12.64	
43	6	Housna Ousmane	Chad	12.78	
44	3	Alba Mbo Nchama	Equatorial Guinea	13.14	
45	8	Maliea Nalane	Lesotho	13.14	
46	3	Dusamane Hassaue	Chad	13.22	
47	5	Eugenie Sandy	Guinea	13.34	
48	7	Sefora Ada Eto	Equatorial Guinea	13.94	
49	6	Souraia Sahna Mancu	Guinea-Bissau	14.53	
	1	Symone Darius	Liberia	DNF	
	8	Mylena Tsogo Etoundou	Cameroon	DNF	
	2	Hadja Saran Kouate	Guinea	DNS	
	5	Akouvi Judith Koumedzina	Togo	DNS	
	6	Victória Cassinda	Angola	DNS	

=== Semifinals ===
Held on 22 June

Qualification: First 2 of each semifinal (Q) and the next 2 fastest (q) qualified for the final.

Wind:
Heat 1: 0.0 m/s, Heat 2: 0.0 m/s, Heat 3: -0.5 m/s

Rank	Heat	Name	Nationality	Time	Notes
1	3	Gina Bass-Bittaye	Gambia	11.19	Q
2	3	Destiny Smith-Barnett	Liberia	11.26	Q
3	3	Maboundou Koné	Ivory Coast	11.28	q
4	1	Maia McCoy	Liberia	11.33	Q
5	2	Asimenye Simwaka	Malawi	11.35	Q, NR
6	2	Tsaone Sebele	Botswana	11.42	Q
7	2	Halutie Hor	Ghana	11.48	q
8	3	Tamzin Thomas	South Africa	11.48	
9	2	Pierrick-Linda Moulin	Gabon	11.49	
10	1	Olayinka Olajide	Nigeria	11.52	Q
11	1	Claudine Njarasoa	Madagascar	11.53	
12	1	Sadé Amor de Sousa	Namibia	11.53	
13	1	Viwe Jingqi	South Africa	11.73	
13	2	Deborah Acheampong	Ghana	11.73	
15	3	Herverge Kole Etame	Cameroon	11.76	
16	3	Rosemary Chukwuma	Nigeria	11.79	
17	2	Téclaire Iris Mikal	Ghana	11.90	
17	3	Bongiwe Mahlalela	Eswatini	11.90	
19	1	Sethunya Majama	Botswana	11.94	
20	3	Christine Mboma	Namibia	12.00	
21	1	Gorete Semedo	São Tomé and Príncipe	12.05	
22	2	Lou Chantal Djehi	Ivory Coast	12.07	
	1	Esther Mbagari	Kenya	DNS	
	1	Marie Josée Ta Lou-Smith	Ivory Coast	DNS	
	2	Favour Ofili	Nigeria	DNS	

=== Final ===
Held on 22 June

Wind: 0.0 m/s

Rank	Lane	Athlete	Nationality	Time	Notes
1st place, gold medalist(s)	5	Gina Bass-Bittaye	Gambia	11.14	
2nd place, silver medalist(s)	4	Maia McCoy	Liberia	11.16	
3rd place, bronze medalist(s)	1	Maboundou Koné	Ivory Coast	11.24	
4	3	Destiny Smith-Barnett	Liberia	11.34	
5	8	Tsaone Sebele	Botswana	11.45	
6	6	Asimenye Simwaka	Malawi	11.49	
7	7	Olayinka Olajide	Nigeria	11.55	
8	2	Halutie Hor	Ghana	11.73	

== See also ==
- Athletics at the 2023 African Games – Women's 100 metres
