= 2024 African Championships in Athletics – Women's 200 metres =

Women's 200 metres at the 2024 African Championships in Athletics
- Venue: Japoma Stadium
- Location: Douala, Cameroon
- Dates: 25 June (heats & semi-finals); 26 June (final)
- Competitors: 36 from 23 nations
- Winning time: 22.84

Medalists
gold medal	Jessika Gbai	Ivory Coast
silver medal	Maboundou Koné	Ivory Coast
bronze medal	Asimenye Simwaka	Malawi

The women's 200 metres event at the 2024 African Championships in Athletics was held on 25 and 26 June in Douala, Cameroon.

== Records ==
Records before the 2024 African Athletics Championships
Record	Athlete (nation)	Time (s)	Location	Date
World record	Florence Griffith Joyner (USA)	21.34	Seoul, South Korea	28 September 1988
African record	Christine Mboma (NAM)	21.78	Zurich, Switzerland	9 September 2021
Championship record	Falilat Ogunkoya (NGR)	22.22	Dakar, Senegal	22 August 1998
World leading	McKenzie Long (USA)	21.83	Eugene, United States	8 June 2024
African leading	Favour Ofili (NGR)	22.33	Gainesville, United States	12 April 2024

== Results ==
=== Heats ===
Held on 25 June

Qualification: First 3 of each heat (Q) and the next 3 fastest (q) qualified for the semifinals.

Wind:
Heat 1: 0.0 m/s, Heat 2: 0.5 m/s, Heat 3: -0.4 m/s, Heat 4: +0.1 m/s, Heat 5: +1.1 m/s, Heat 6: +0.1 m/s, Heat 7: -0.6 m/s

Rank	Heat	Name	Nationality	Time	Notes
1	6	Tsaone Sebele	Botswana	22.84	Q, NR
2	3	Asimenye Simwaka	Malawi	23.01	Q, NR
3	7	Miranda Coetzee	South Africa	23.26	Q
4	7	Destiny Smith-Barnett	Liberia	23.33	Q
5	5	Maboundou Koné	Ivory Coast	23.38	Q
6	5	Shirley Nekhubui	South Africa	23.45	Q
7	7	Mary Boakye	Ghana	23.46	Q
8	3	Bassant Hemida	Egypt	23.59	Q
9	4	Jessika Gbai	Ivory Coast	23.63	Q
10	2	Herverge Kole Etame	Cameroon	23.81	Q
11	1	Viwe Jingqi	South Africa	23.85	Q
12	4	Gorete Semedo	São Tomé and Príncipe	23.90	Q
13	3	Esther Mbagari	Kenya	23.91	Q
14	6	Samira Awal	Niger	23.92	Q
15	2	Pierrick-Linda Moulin	Gabon	24.01	Q
16	1	Symone Darius	Liberia	24.09	Q
17	4	Bongiwe Mahlalela	Eswatini	24.11	Q
18	3	Christine Mboma	Namibia	24.12	q
19	5	Elodie Malessara	Republic of the Congo	24.27	Q
20	3	Sara El Hachimi	Morocco	24.35	q
21	6	Rahel Tesfaye	Ethiopia	24.45	Q
22	1	Saran Hadja Kouyate	Guinea	24.47	Q
23	6	Merveille Imboula Gavouka	Republic of the Congo	24.51	q
24	4	Jade Nangula	Namibia	24.58	
25	3	Irène Bell Bonong	Cameroon	24.75	
26	1	Natacha Chetty	Seychelles	25.07	
26	2	Lebitso Mokorofu	Botswana	25.07	Q
28	5	Amelie Anthony	Mauritius	25.25	
29	3	Jalika Bajinka	Gambia	25.27	
30	1	Elsiane Adjinda	Benin	25.29	
31	6	Elos Divine Kandomba	Democratic Republic of the Congo	25.36	
32	4	Jawneh Nyimasata	Gambia	25.69	
33	1	Oceanne Moirt	Mauritius	25.77	
34	5	Johanna Ludgerus	Namibia	25.87	
35	7	Housna Ousmane Ouadri	Chad	26.58	
36	4	Ousmane Hassanie	Chad	26.75	
	1	Akouvi Judith Koumedzina	Togo	DNS	
	1	Monicah Safania	Kenya	DNS	
	2	Favour Ofili	Nigeria	DNS	
	2	Eunice Kadogo	Kenya	DNS	
	2	Thelma Davies	Liberia	DNS	
	2	Natacha Ngoye Akamabi	Republic of the Congo	DNS	
	2	Souraia Sahna Mancu	Guinea-Bissau	DNS	
	3	Victória Cassinda	Angola	DNS	
	4	Baytulay Aliye	Ethiopia	DNS	
	4	Rosemary Chukwuma	Nigeria	DNS	
	5	Tima Godbless	Nigeria	DNS	
	5	Refilwe Murangi	Botswana	DNS	
	6	Anita Afrifa	Ghana	DNS	
	7	Alba Mbo Nchama	Equatorial Guinea	DNS	
	7	Lucia William Moris	South Sudan	DNS	

=== Semifinals ===
Held on 25 June

Qualification: First 2 of each semifinal (Q) and the next 2 fastest (q) qualified for the final.

Wind:
Heat 1: -0.2 m/s, Heat 2: +0.3 m/s, Heat 3: +0.1 m/s

Rank	Heat	Name	Nationality	Time	Notes
1	2	Jessika Gbai	Ivory Coast	22.80	Q
2	2	Asimenye Simwaka	Malawi	22.91	Q, NR
3	1	Maboundou Koné	Ivory Coast	22.99	Q
4	1	Shirley Nekhubui	South Africa	23.29	Q
5	2	Destiny Smith-Barnett	Liberia	23.34	q
6	1	Mary Boakye	Ghana	23.36	q
7	3	Tsaone Sebele	Botswana	23.38	Q
8	2	Bongiwe Mahlalela	Eswatini	23.67	
9	3	Herverge Kole Etame	Cameroon	23.73	Q
10	1	Esther Mbagari	Kenya	23.77	
10	2	Gorete Semedo	São Tomé and Príncipe	23.77	
12	3	Viwe Jingqi	South Africa	23.79	
13	3	Symone Darius	Liberia	23.99	
14	2	Pierrick-Linda Moulin	Gabon	24.29	
15	1	Christine Mboma	Namibia	24.37	
16	3	Elodie Malessara	Republic of the Congo	24.38	
17	3	Samira Awal	Niger	24.61	
18	2	Sara El Hachimi	Morocco	24.64	
19	2	Saran Hadja Kouyate	Guinea	24.64	
20	3	Rahel Tesfaye	Ethiopia	24.89	
21	1	Lebitso Mokorofu	Botswana	24.97	
22	3	Merveille Imboula Gavouka	Republic of the Congo	25.05	
	1	Miranda Coetzee	South Africa	DNS	
	1	Bassant Hemida	Egypt	DNS	

=== Final ===
Held on 26 June

Wind: 0.0 m/s

Rank	Lane	Athlete	Nationality	Time	Notes
1st place, gold medalist(s)	4	Jessika Gbai	Ivory Coast	22.84	
2nd place, silver medalist(s)	5	Maboundou Koné	Ivory Coast	22.99	
3rd place, bronze medalist(s)	6	Asimenye Simwaka	Malawi	23.05	
4	2	Mary Boakye	Ghana	23.40	
5	7	Shirley Nekhubui	South Africa	23.44	
6	8	Herverge Kole Etame	Cameroon	23.83	
	3	Tsaone Sebele	Botswana	DNF	
	1	Destiny Smith-Barnett	Liberia	DNS	

== See also ==
- Athletics at the 2023 African Games – Women's 200 metres
