= Athletics at the 2023 African Games – Women's 100 metres =

The women's 100 metres event at the 2023 African Games was held on 18 and 19 March 2024 in Accra, Ghana.

== Medalists ==
Gold	Silver	Bronze
Gina Bass; The Gambia	Maia McCoy; Liberia	Olayinka Olajide; Nigeria

== Results ==
=== Heats ===
Held on 18 March
Qualification: First 4 in each heat (Q) and the next 4 fastest (q) advanced to the semifinals.

Wind:
Heat 1: +0.3 m/s, Heat 2: -0.8 m/s, Heat 3: -0.1 m/s, Heat 4: -2.4 m/s, Heat 5: -2.3 m/s

Rank	Heat	Name	Nationality	Time	Notes
1	2	Gina Bass	The Gambia	11.35	Q
2	3	Tiana Eyakpobeyan	Nigeria	11.43	Q
3	2	Maia McCoy	Liberia	11.43	Q
4	1	Natacha Ngoye Akamabi	Republic of the Congo	11.46	Q
5	3	Mary Boakye	Ghana	11.50	Q
6	4	Olayinka Olajide	Nigeria	11.51	Q
7	3	Tsaone Sebele	Botswana	11.64	Q
8	5	Blessing Ogundiran	Nigeria	11.65	Q
9	2	Gorete Semedo	São Tomé and Príncipe	11.68	Q
10	1	Halutie Hor	Ghana	11.69	Q
11	1	Claudine Njarasoa	Madagascar	11.70	Q
12	5	Pierrick-Linda Moulin	Gabon	11.73	Q
13	5	Bongiwe Mahlalela	Eswatini	11.75	Q
14	4	Tamzin Thomas	South Africa	11.78	Q
15	3	Oceane Moirt	Mauritius	11.81	Q
16	2	Jacent Nyamahunge	Uganda	11.83	Q
17	1	Phindile Kubheka	South Africa	11.84	Q
18	3	Ndawana Haitembu	Namibia	11.85	q
19	5	Sade De Sousa	Namibia	11.87	Q
20	3	Joviale Mbisha	South Africa	11.89	q
21	4	Edina Ngandula	Zambia	11.91	Q
22	2	Benedicta Kwartemaa	Ghana	11.95	q
23	1	Nancy Budzwani	Botswana	11.97	q
24	4	Yeabsiira Jarso	Ethiopia	11.98	Q
25	5	Esther Mbagari	Kenya	12.00	
26	3	Hafsatu Kamara	Sierra Leone	12.05	
27	2	Madina Touré	Burkina Faso	12.06	
28	1	Ndeye-Arame Touré	Senegal	12.08	
28	2	Batula Alyu	Ethiopia	12.08	
30	1	Eunice Kadogo	Kenya	12.11	
31	3	Rahel Tesfaye	Ethiopia	12.14	
32	3	Lucia Morris	South Sudan	12.18	
33	4	Jade Nangula	Namibia	12.27	
34	2	Marie-Amelie Anthony	Mauritius	12.30	
35	2	Safiatou Acquaviva	Guinea	12.31	
36	4	Awa Zongo	Burkina Faso	12.35	
37	5	Aminata Kamara	Sierra Leone	12.44	
38	4	Béatrice Midomide	Benin	12.47	
39	1	Natalia Eyi Cubacuba	Equatorial Guinea	12.51	
40	5	Fréjus Hanie Taty Mbikou	Republic of the Congo	12.64	
41	5	Haingo Razanajafy	Madagascar	12.86	
42	4	Carole Kiyindou Banzouzi	Republic of the Congo	13.08	
43	1	Nancy Tokpah	Liberia	13.27	
44	4	Victória Cassinda	Angola	13.63	
45	5	Ruth Henriques	Angola	13.85	

=== Semifinals ===
Held on 18 March
Qualification: First 2 in each semifinal (Q) and the next 2 fastest (q) advanced to the final.

Wind:
Heat 1: -1.5 m/s, Heat 2: -0.7 m/s, Heat 3: -1.3 m/s

Rank	Heat	Name	Nationality	Time	Notes
1	3	Gina Bass	The Gambia	11.37	Q
2	1	Olayinka Olajide	Nigeria	11.46	Q
3	1	Natacha Ngoye Akamabi	Republic of the Congo	11.48	Q
4	3	Claudine Njarasoa	Madagascar	11.59	Q
5	2	Tiana Eyakpobeyan	Nigeria	11.61	Q
6	3	Mary Boakye	Ghana	11.64	q
7	2	Tsaone Sebele	Botswana	11.65	Q
8	2	Maia McCoy	Liberia	11.65	q
9	3	Gorete Semedo	São Tomé and Príncipe	11.73	
10	2	Halutie Hor	Ghana	11.74	
11	2	Jacent Nyamahunge	Uganda	11.75	
12	3	Blessing Ogundiran	Nigeria	11.77	
13	1	Pierrick-Linda Moulin	Gabon	11.79	
14	1	Tamzin Thomas	South Africa	11.88	
15	2	Joviale Mbisha	South Africa	11.88	
16	2	Bongiwe Mahlalela	Eswatini	11.92	
16	2	Yeabsiira Jarso	Ethiopia	11.92	
18	1	Benedicta Kwartemaa	Ghana	11.92	
19	3	Sade De Sousa	Namibia	11.96	
20	3	Phindile Kubheka	South Africa	12.01	
21	1	Edina Ngandula	Zambia	12.07	
22	1	Ndawana Haitembu	Namibia	12.10	
23	1	Oceane Moirt	Mauritius	12.18	
24	3	Nancy Budzwani	Botswana	12.29	

=== Final ===
Held on 19 March
Wind: -1.3 m/s

Rank	Lane	Name	Nationality	Time	Notes
1st place, gold medalist(s)	6	Gina Bass	The Gambia	11.36	
2nd place, silver medalist(s)	2	Maia McCoy	Liberia	11.49	
3rd place, bronze medalist(s)	4	Olayinka Olajide	Nigeria	11.55	
4	3	Claudine Njarasoa	Madagascar	11.55	
5	5	Tiana Eyakpobeyan	Nigeria	11.60	
6	7	Natacha Ngoye Akamabi	Republic of the Congo	11.66	
7	9	Mary Boakye	Ghana	11.71	
8	8	Tsaone Sebele	Botswana	11.78	
