= 2024 African Championships in Athletics – Women's 4 × 100 metres relay =

Women's 4 × 100 metres relay at the 2024 African Championships in Athletics
- Venue: Japoma Stadium
- Location: Douala, Cameroon
- Dates: 23 June (heats); 24 June (final)
- Nations: 10
- Winning time: 43.01

Medalists
gold medal	Tiana Eyakpobeyan; Tima Godbless; Olayinka Olajide; Tobi Amusan; Adaobi Tabugbo*	Nigeria
silver medal	Mary Boakye; Anita Afrifa; Halutie Hor; Deborah Acheampong	Ghana
bronze medal	Destiny Smith-Barnett; Maia McCoy; Ebony Morrison; Thelma Davies; Symone Darius*	Liberia

The women's 4 × 100 metres relay event at the 2024 African Championships in Athletics was held on 23 and 24 June in Douala, Cameroon.

== Results ==
=== Heats ===
Qualification: First 2 teams of each heat (Q) plus the next 2 fastest (q) qualified for the final.

Rank	Heat	Nation	Athletes	Time	Notes
1	1	Liberia	Destiny Smith-Barnett, Maia McCoy, Symone Darius, Ebony Morrison	42.93	Q, CR
2	2	Nigeria	Tiana Eyakpobeyan, Olayinka Olajide, Adaobi Tabugbo, Tima Godbless	43.58	Q
3	1	Ghana	Mary Boakye, Anita Afrifa, Halutie Hor, Deborah Acheampong	43.89	Q
4	2	Botswana	Refilwe Murangi, Tsaone Sebele, Sethunya Majama, Tshepang Manyika	44.78	Q
5	2	Namibia	Johanna Ludgerus, Jade Nangula, Ndawana Haitembu, Sadé Amor de Sousa	45.55	Q
6	2	Kenya	Eunice Kadogo, Esther Mbagari, Nusra Rukia, Monicah Safania	45.87	q
7	1	Republic of the Congo	Elodie Malessara, Merveille Imboula Gavouka, Natacha Ngoye Akamabi, Fréjus Hanie Taty Mbikou	45.99	Q
8	1	Burkina Faso	Madina Touré, Fatoumata Koala, Leopoldine Ye, Latifatou Millongo	47.26	q
9	1	Gambia	Jalika Bajinka, Jawneh Nyimasata, Fatou Sanneh, Gina Bass-Bittaye	55.21	
	1	Cameroon	Stéphanie Njuh Nstella, Irène Bell Bonong, Téclaire Iris Mikal, Herverge Kole Etame	DQ	

=== Final ===
Rank	Lane	Nation	Competitors	Time	Notes
1st place, gold medalist(s)	5	Nigeria	Tiana Eyakpobeyan, Tima Godbless, Olayinka Olajide, Tobi Amusan	43.01	
2nd place, silver medalist(s)	3	Ghana	Mary Boakye, Anita Afrifa, Halutie Hor, Deborah Acheampong	43.62	
3rd place, bronze medalist(s)	6	Liberia	Destiny Smith-Barnett, Maia McCoy, Ebony Morrison, Thelma Davies	44.38	
4	4	Botswana	Refilwe Murangi, Tsaone Sebele, Sethunya Majama, Tshepang Manyika	44.69	=NR
5	8	Namibia	Johanna Ludgerus, Jade Nangula, Ndawana Haitembu, Sadé Amor de Sousa	45.74	
6	7	Republic of the Congo	Elodie Malessara, Merveille Imboula Gavouka, Natacha Ngoye Akamabi, Fréjus Hanie Taty Mbikou	45.90	
7	1	Kenya	Eunice Kadogo, Esther Mbagari, Nusra Rukia, Monicah Safania	46.63	
8	2	Burkina Faso	Nemata Nikiema, Fatoumata Koala, Madina Touré, Leopoldine Ye	46.83	

== See also ==
- Athletics at the 2023 African Games – Women's 4 × 100 metres relay
