= Athletics at the 2023 African Games – Women's 4 × 100 metres relay =

The women's 4 × 100 metres relay event at the 2023 African Games was held on 19 and 20 March 2024 in Accra, Ghana.

== Medalists ==
Gold	Silver	Bronze
Nigeria; Tiana Eyakpobeyan; Olayinka Olajide; Moforehan Abinusawa; Tobi Amusan; Chisom Onyebuchi*; Blessing Ogundiran*	Liberia; Ebony Morrison; Destiny Smith-Barnett; Maia McCoy; Shania Collins	Ghana; Mary Boakye; Janet Mensah; Doris Mensah; Halutie Hor; Benedicta Kwartemaa*

*Athletes who competed in heats only

== Results ==
=== Heats ===
Qualification: First 3 teams of each heat (Q) plus the next 2 fastest (q) qualified for the final.

Rank	Heat	Nation	Athletes	Time	Notes
1	1	Liberia	Ebony Morrison, Destiny Smith-Barnett, Maia McCoy, Shania Collins	43.73	Q
2	1	Nigeria	Tiana Eyakpobeyan, Olayinka Olajide, Chisom Onyebuchi, Blessing Ogundiran	43.91	Q
3	2	Ghana	Mary Boakye, Benedicta Kwartemaa, Janet Mensah, Halutie Hor	44.24	Q
4	2	South Africa	Phindile Kubheka, Tamzin Thomas, Joviale Mbisha, Banele Shabangu	44.84	Q
5	2	Ethiopia	Yabsira Jarso, Rahel Tesfaye, Eyayu Mekuanent, Baytula Aliye	45.73	Q
6	2	Namibia	Johanna Ludgerus, Jade Nangula, Hanganeni Fikunawa, Sade de Sousa	45.88	q
7	2	Burkina Faso	Latifatou Millogo, Fatoumata Koala, Madina Touré, Marthe Koala	46.40	q
8	1	Kenya	Eunice Kadogo, Millicent Ndoro, Rukia Omulisia, Esther Mbagari	46.42	Q
9	1	Republic of the Congo	Taty Fréjus Hanie, Elodie Malessara, Carole Kiyindou Banzouzi, Merveille Imboula Gavouka	47.11	

=== Final ===
Rank	Lane	Nation	Athletes	Time	Notes
1st place, gold medalist(s)	4	Nigeria	Tiana Eyakpobeyan, Olayinka Olajide, Moforehan Abinusawa, Tobi Amusan	43.05	
2nd place, silver medalist(s)	6	Liberia	Ebony Morrison, Destiny Smith-Barnett, Maia McCoy, Shania Collins	44.02	
3rd place, bronze medalist(s)	4	Ghana	Mary Boakye, Janet Mensah, Doris Mensah, Halutie Hor	44.21	
4	5	South Africa	Phindile Kubheka, Tamzin Thomas, Joviale Mbisha, Banele Shabangu	44.72	
5	8	Namibia	Hanganeni Fikunawa, Sade de Sousa, Jade Nangula, Ndawana Haitembu	45.64	
6	7	Ethiopia	Yabsira Jarso, Rahel Tesfaye, Eyayu Mekuanent, Baytula Aliye	45.66	
7	1	Burkina Faso	Latifatou Millogo, Zalissa Zongo, Fatoumata Koala, Madina Touré	49.53	
	2	Kenya	Eunice Kadogo, Winny Bii, Rukia Omulisia, Esther Mbagari	DNF	
