= 2026 African Championships in Athletics – Women's 4 × 100 metres relay =

Women's 4 × 100 metres relay at the 2026 African Championships in Athletics
- Venue: Legon Sports Stadium
- Location: Accra, Ghana
- Dates: 15 May
- Winning time: 42.94

Medalists
gold medal	Rosemary Nwankwo; Obi Jennifer Chukwuka; Rosemary Chukwuma; Miracle Ezechukwu	Nigeria
silver medal	Destiny Smith-Barnett; Symone Darius; Chante Clinkscale; Thelma Davies]	Liberia
bronze medal	Gladys Boateng; Aisha Jafar; Janet Mensah; Janet Kwateng Darkoah	Ghana

The women's 4 × 100 metres relay event at the 2026 African Championships in Athletics was held on 15 May in Accra, Ghana.

== Results ==
Rank	Lane	Nation	Competitors	Time	Notes
1st place, gold medalist(s)	4	Nigeria	Rosemary Nwankwo, Obi Jennifer Chukwuka, Rosemary Chukwuma, Miracle Ezechukwu	42.94	
2nd place, silver medalist(s)	8	Liberia	Destiny Smith-Barnett, Chante Clinkscale, Symone Darius, Thelma Davies	43.05	
3rd place, bronze medalist(s)	2	Ghana	Gladys Boateng, Aisha Jafar, Janet Mensah, Janet Kwateng Darkoah	44.85	
4	6	Ivory Coast	Aude Bogui, ?, Lou Yonan Chantal Djehi, Ella Klahdawa	44.87	
5	7	Senegal	Maimouna Badji, ?, Saly Safietou Faboure, ?	44.90	
6	1	Gambia	?, ?, ?, Isatou Sey	45.02	
7	5	Botswana	?, Boitshepiso Kelapile, Katlego Kaisara, Karabo Mantswinyane	45.03	
8	3	Kenya	Eunice Kadogo, Lillian Owako, ?, Milcent Ndoro	45.18	
