= Liberia at the 2023 African Games =

- Flag of Liberia
- IOC code: LBR
- NOC: Liberia National Olympic Committee

in Accra, Ghana 8 March 2024 – 23 March 2024
- Competitors: 21 in 4 sports
- Medals Ranked 33rd: Gold 0 Silver 2 Bronze 2 Total 4

African Games appearances
- 2011; 2015; 2019; 2023

Liberia competed at the 2023 African Games held from 8 to 23 March 2024 in Accra, Ghana. Liberia competed in 4 sports.

== Medal table ==
Medal	Name	Sport	Event	Date
Silver	Maia McCoy	Athletics	Women's 100 metres	19 March
Silver	Ebony Morrison; Maia McCoy; Shania Collins; Destiny Smith-Barnett	Athletics	Women's 4 × 100 metres relay	20 March
Bronze	John Sherman; Emmanuel Matadi; Jabez Reeves; Joseph Fahnbulleh	Athletics	Men's 4 × 100 metres relay	20 March
Bronze	Grace Fahnbulleh	Boxing	Women's 50 kg	22 March
