= Tamzin Thomas =

South African sprinter (born 1997)

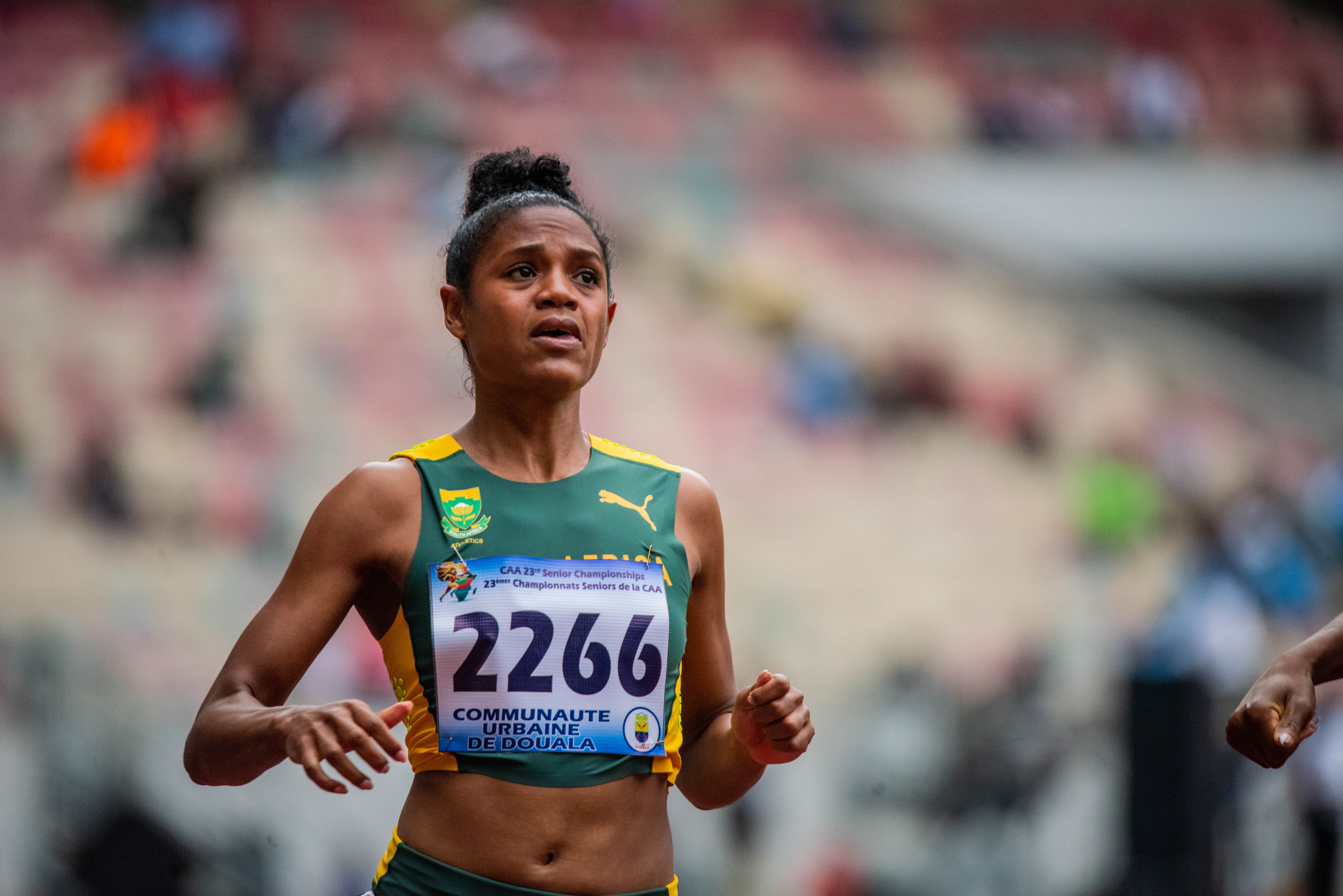

Personal information
- Born: 6 October 1997 (age 28) Mitchells Plain, Cape Town, South Africa
- Education: University of the Western Cape

Sport
- Sport: Athletics
- Events: 100 m, 200 m
Medal record
Women's athletics
Representing South Africa
African Championships
Gold medal – first place	2016 Durban	4×100 m
World University Games
Bronze medal – third place	2021 Chengdu	4×100 m

Tamzin Thomas (born 6 October 1997) is a South African sprinter. She won two medals at the 2015 African Junior Championships.

== International competitions ==
Year	Competition	Venue	Position	Event	Notes
Representing South Africa
2013	World Youth Championships	Donetsk, Ukraine	9th (sf)	100 m	11.82
2015	African Junior Championships	Addis Ababa, Ethiopia	1st	100 m	11.69
2015	African Junior Championships	Addis Ababa, Ethiopia	2nd	4 × 100 m relay	46.49
2016	African Championships	Durban, South Africa	8th (h)	200 m	23.92^{1}
2016	African Championships	Durban, South Africa	–	4 × 100 m relay	DQ
2016	World U20 Championships	Bydgoszcz, Poland	17th (sf)	100 m	11.71
2016	World U20 Championships	Bydgoszcz, Poland	23rd (sf)	200 m	24.49
2016	World U20 Championships	Bydgoszcz, Poland	11th (h)	4 × 100 m relay	45.98
2017	Universiade	Taipei, Taiwan	11th (sf)	100 m	11.77
2017	Universiade	Taipei, Taiwan	10th (sf)	200 m	23.86
2017	Universiade	Taipei, Taiwan	–	4 × 100 m relay	DQ
2018	African Championships	Asaba, Nigeria	11th (sf)	200 m	24.28^{1}
2018	African Championships	Asaba, Nigeria	4th	4 × 100 m relay	45.63
2019	World Relays	Yokohama, Japan	–	4 × 100 m relay	DNF
2019	Universiade	Naples, Italy	10th (sf)	100 m	11.62
2019	Universiade	Naples, Italy	11th (sf)	200 m	23.66
2019	Universiade	Naples, Italy	7th	4 × 400 m relay	3:35.97
2019	African Games	Rabat, Morocco	13th (sf)	200 m	24.07
2019	African Games	Rabat, Morocco	2nd	4 × 100 m relay	44.61
2022	African Championships	Port Louis, Mauritius	13th (sf)	200 m	23.85
2022	African Championships	Port Louis, Mauritius	3rd (h)	4 × 100 m relay	45.21
2023	World University Games	Chengdu, China	–	100 m	DQ
2023	World University Games	Chengdu, China	3rd	4 × 100 m relay	44.36
2024	African Games	Accra, Ghana	14th (sf)	100 m	11.88
2024	African Games	Accra, Ghana	4th	4 × 100 m relay	44.72
2024	African Championships	Douala, Cameroon	8th (sf)	100 m	11.48

^{1}Did not start in the semifinals

== Personal bests ==
Outdoor

- 100 metres – 11.41 (+1.6 m/s, Pretoria 2018)
- 200 metres – 23.12 (+1.7 m/s, Pretoria 2018)
