= Jessika Gbai =

Ivorian sprinter (born 1998)

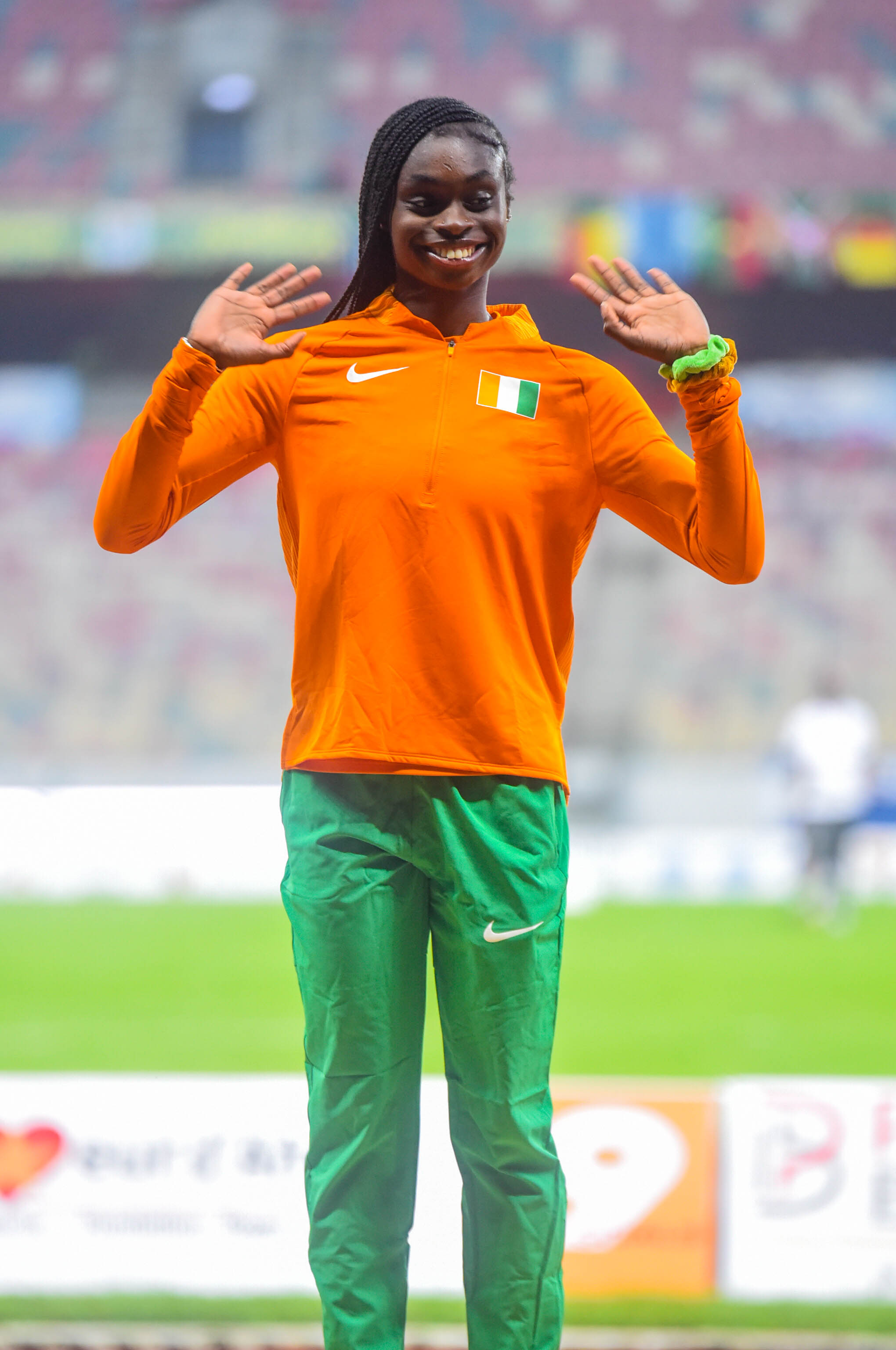

Personal information
- Full name: Jessika Lauren Maca Gbai
- Nationality: Ivory Coast
- Born: 29 December 1998 (age 27) Daloa, Côte d'Ivoire
- Education: Howard University
- Height: 1.67 m (5 ft 6 in)

Sport
- Sport: Athletics
- Event: Sprint

Achievements and titles
- Personal bests: 100m: 11.22 (Clermont, 2023); 200m:22.36 (Paris, 2024)
Medal record
Women's athletics
Representing the Ivory Coast
African Championships
Gold medal – first place	2024 Douala	200 m

Jessika Lauren Maca Gbai (born 29 December 1998) is an Ivorian track and field athlete from the Ivory Coast who competes as a sprinter. Gbai made her Olympic debut for women's 200m on 4 August 2024 at the 2024 Summer Olympics in Paris. And successfully made into the final, finished in 8th for her Olympic-Final debut as a first-time Olympian.

== Early life ==
Jessika Gbai born in Côte d'Ivoire, moved to Philadelphia (USA) as a child, she holds both citizenships. Was cleared by World Athletics to represent Côte d'Ivoire starting from 1 June 2022.

She graduated from Howard University, where she competed for the Howard Bison track and field team and graduated in 2022 with degrees in biology and political science.

== Career ==
Jessika Gbai competed in the 200 metres at the 2022 World Athletics Championships in Eugene, Oregon, running 22.82 seconds in the semi-final.

She was part of the Ivory Coast 4 × 100 m relay team that ran 42.23 seconds to set a new national record win the Diamond League meeting in Lausanne. In August 2023, she set a new personal best time for the 200 meters of 22.43 seconds in Kinshasa jn winning gold for the Ivory Coast at the 2023 Francophone Games.

Selected for the 200 metres at the 2023 World Athletics Championships in Budapest kn August 2023, she qualified for the semi-finals.

She ran as part of the Ivory Coast 4 × 100 m relay team which qualified for the 2024 Paris Olympics at the 2024 World Relays Championships in Nassau, Bahamas.

Jessika Gbai made her Olympics debut for women's 200m on 4 August 2024 at the 2024 Summer Olympics in Paris. In 200m, she finished her semi finals with a new personal best 22.36s. She successfully made into the final for 200m as a first-time Olympian, finished in 8th with a time of 22.70s She also competed in the 4 × 100 m relay at the Games.

She ran 23.14 seconds to finish sixth in the 200 metres at the 2025 Xiamen Diamond League event in China, in April 2025. She also finishes sixth at the 2025 Shanghai Diamond League event in China on 3 May 2025, in a new seasons best time of 22.88 seconds. In May 2025, she was named as a challenger for the long sprints category at the 2025 Grand Slam Track event in Philadelphia. She finished sixth over 200 metres at the Diamond League event at the 2025 Golden Gala in Rome on 6 June 2025. She placed seventh over 200 metres at the Diamond League Final in Zurich on 28 August.

In September 2025, she was a semi-finalist in the 200 metres at the 2025 World Championships in Tokyo, Japan. She also ran in the women's 4 x 100 metres relay at the championships.

== Athletics achievements ==
Information from her World Athletics profile unless otherwise noted.

=== Personal bests ===
Type	Distance	Time (s)	Wind (m/s)	Venue	Date	Notes
Individual events
Indoor	60 metres	7.51	—N/a	Virginia Beach, United States	23 February 2022	
Indoor	200 metres sh	23.78	—N/a	Lynchburg, United States	15 February 2020	
Indoor	200 metres sh	23.78	—N/a	Virginia Beach, United States	23 February 2022	
Indoor	300 metres sh	37.62	—N/a	Gainesville, United States	17 January 2025	
Indoor	400 metres sh	53.19	—N/a	Clemson, United States	31 January 2025	NR
Outdoor	100 metres	11.22	+0.9	Clermont, United States	14 May 2023	
Outdoor	200 metres	22.36	+0.1	Paris, France	5 August 2024	
Outdoor	300 metres	36.16	—N/a	Coral Gables, United States	15 March 2024	NR
Outdoor	400 metres	51.94	—N/a	Gainesville, United States	13 April 2024	NR
Team events
Indoor	4 × 200 metres relay sh	1:39.68	—N/a	New York, United States	15 January 2022	
Indoor	4 × 400 metres relay sh	3:38.67	—N/a	Virginia Beach, United States	23 February 2022	
Outdoor	4 × 100 metres relay	41.90	—N/a	Budapest, Hungary	25 August 2023	AR NR
Outdoor	4 × 400 metres relay	3:25.08	—N/a	Gainesville, United States	30 March 2024	

=== International competitions ===
Representing Ivory Coast
Year	Competition	Venue	Position	Event	Time	Notes
2022	World Championships	Eugene, Oregon	18th (sf)	200 m	22.84	
2023	World Championships	Budapest, Hungary	19th (sf)	200 m	22.88	
2023	World Championships	Budapest, Hungary	—	4 × 100 m relay	DNF	
2024	World Relays	Nassau, The Bahamas	6th (h)	4 × 100 m relay	42.63	
2024	African Championships	Douala, Cameroon	1st	200 m	22.84	
2024	Olympic Games	Paris, France	8th	200 m	22.70	
2024	Olympic Games	Paris, France	—	4 × 100 m relay	DQ	TR17.2.3
2025	World Championships	Tokyo, Japan	11th (sf)	200 m	22.56	SB
2025	World Championships	Tokyo, Japan	12th (sf)	4 × 100 m relay	44.64	

=== Circuit performances ===
Grand Slam Track results
Slam	Race group	Event	Pl.	Time	Prize money
2025 Philadelphia Slam	Long sprints	400 m	7th	52.54	US$25,000
2025 Philadelphia Slam	Long sprints	200 m	3rd	22.85	US$25,000
