= 2026 Enhanced Games =

Multi-sport event held in Las Vegas

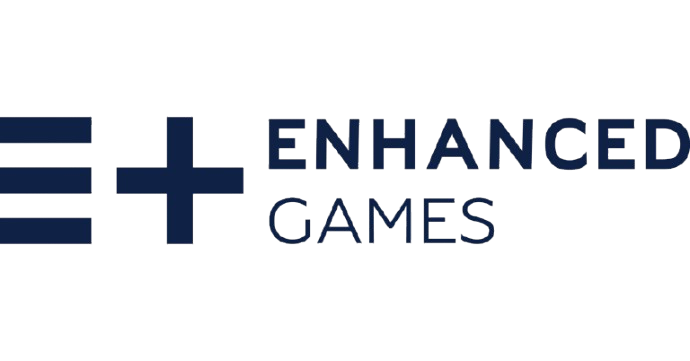
- Logo of the Enhanced Games
- Host city: Las Vegas, Nevada, US
- Athletes: 42 from 24 countries
- Events: 23 in 3 sports
- Dates: 24 May 2026
- Main venue: Resorts World Las Vegas

The 2026 Enhanced Games were the inaugural edition Enhanced Games which took place on 24 May 2026 at Resorts World Las Vegas in Las Vegas, Nevada, US. The event served as the debut for the organization's model and featured competitions across three core disciplines: athletics, swimming, and weightlifting.

Media outlets such as the Financial Times and the Las Vegas Review-Journal reported critics dubbed the event the "steroid Olympics". According to the MIT Technology Review in June 2026, the event served as a publicity stunt for their own range of performance enhancing products.

== Venue ==
The 2026 Enhanced Games were held in temporary, purpose-built $50 million open-air arena in the parking lot of Resorts World Las Vegas, Winchester, Nevada. The arena was constructed in 35 days and contained a six-lane 100m sprint track, a four-lane 50m pool, a weightlifting stage and a platform that could seat thousands of spectators. The arena was 26 meters tall and 76.5 meters wide. LED screens relayed the events to spectators in the arena, and they were also livestreamed to others watching via social media. Between events, advertisements were shown for performance products sold by Enhanced.

== Sports ==
Twenty-three events were held in three sports:

2026 Enhanced Games
- Athletics
- Swimming
- Weightlifting

== Participating countries ==
Athletes from 24 countries competed at the 2026 Enhanced Games:

Participating countries
- Australia (1)
- Barbados (1)
- Brazil (1)
- Bulgaria (2)
- Canada (2)
- Chile (1)
- Colombia (4)
- Dominican Republic (1)
- Egypt (1)
- France (1)
- Germany (2)
- Greece (2)
- Guyana (1)
- Iceland (1)
- Republic of Ireland (2)
- Jamaica (2)
- Mexico (1)
- Nigeria (1)
- Poland (1)
- Russia (1)
- South Africa (1)
- Ukraine (1)
- United Kingdom (2)
- United States (11) (host)

== Athletes ==
Forty two athletes competed at the 2026 Enhanced Games:

Country	Athlete	Age	Sport	Competed using performance-enhancing drugs	Olympics
Australia	James Magnussen	35	Swimming	Yes	2012 ( (silver) (bronze) ), 2016 ( (bronze) )
Greece	Kristian Gkolomeev	32	Swimming	Yes	2012, 2016, 2020, 2024
United States	Megan Romano	35	Swimming	Yes	–
Ukraine	Andriy Govorov	34	Swimming	Yes	2012, 2016
Bulgaria	Josif Miladinov	22	Swimming	Yes	2020, 2024
Ireland	Shane Ryan	32	Swimming	Yes	2016, 2020, 2024
Ireland	Max McCusker	27	Swimming	Yes	2024
United Kingdom	Ben Proud	31	Swimming	Yes	2016, 2020, 2024 ( (silver) )
United States	Fred Kerley	31	Athletics	No	2020 ( (silver) ), 2024 ( (bronze) )
Germany	Marius Kusch	33	Swimming	Yes	2020
Canada	Boady Santavy	29	Weightlifting	Yes	2020, 2024
United States	Wesley Kitts	36	Weightlifting	Yes	2020, 2024
France	Mouhamadou Fall	34	Athletics	Yes	2020
Colombia	Isabella Arcila	32	Swimming	Yes	2016, 2020
Brazil	Felipe Lima	41	Swimming	Yes	2012, 2020
Poland	Natalia Fryckowska	36	Swimming	Yes	–
Russia	Evgenii Somov	27	Swimming	Yes	2024
Liberia	Emmanuel Matadi	35	Athletics	Yes	2016, 2020, 2024
Dominican Republic	Beatriz Pirón	31	Weightlifting	Yes	2012, 2016, 2020, 2024
United States	Cody Miller	34	Swimming	Yes	2016 ( (gold) (bronze) )
United States	Shania Collins	29	Athletics	Yes	–
United Kingdom	Reece Prescod	30	Athletics	Yes	2020
Iceland	Hafþór Júlíus Björnsson	37	Strongman	Yes	–
United States	Marvin Bracy	32	Athletics	Yes	2016
United States	Taylor Anderson	32	Athletics	Yes	–
Germany	Mike Bryan	34	Athletics	Yes	–
South Africa	Clarence Munyai	28	Athletics	Yes	2016, 2020
Jamaica	Shockoria Wallace	33	Athletics	Yes	–
Colombia	Yoni Andica	39	Weightlifting	Yes	–
Chile	Arley Méndez	32	Weightlifting	Yes	2020
Colombia	Leydi Solís	36	Weightlifting	Yes	2008 ( (silver) ), 2016
Colombia	Juan Solís	27	Weightlifting	Yes	–
Nigeria	Mariam Usman	35	Weightlifting	Yes	2008 ( (bronze) ), 2012, 2016
Guyana	Jasmine Abrams	32	Athletics	Yes	2020
United Kingdom	Emily Barclay	30	Swimming	Yes	–
Mexico	Miguel de Lara	31	Swimming	Yes	2024
Bulgaria	Antani Ivanov	26	Swimming	Yes	2020
Jamaica	Denae McFarlane	26	Athletics	Yes	–
Canada	Mitchell Hooper	30	Strongman	Yes	–
United States	Hunter Armstrong	25	Swimming	No	2020 ( (gold) ), 2024 ( (gold) (silver) )
Barbados	Tristan Evelyn	28	Athletics	No	2020, 2024
United States	Dylan Cooper	29	Weightlifting	Yes	–

== Performance-enhancing substances used ==
The drugs used in the 2026 Enhanced Games had to be on the US Food and Drug Administration list of legally approved substances, which includes muscle building substances like testosterone and anabolic steroids; substances that boost endurance, like human growth hormone and Erythropoietin (EPO); stimulants, like Adderall, that improve focus; and metabolic drugs, like meldonium, which alter how the body burns fat.

Enhanced made drug recommendations, but each athlete was free to choose what they took.

According to the Enhanced Games, 91% of the athletes who took performance-enhancing substances used testosterone or testosterone esters; 79% used human growth hormone; 62% used stimulants such as Adderall; 50% used metabolic modulators; 41% used Erythropoietin; and 29% used anabolic steroids.

According to strongman Hafþór Júlíus Björnsson, he took testosterone, nandrolone decanoate, oxymetholone and fluoxymesterone. To compete, he said he had to stop taking methandrostenolone, trenbolone and boldenone undecylenate.

Cody Miller said he took, in the eight-week period leading up to the competition, testosterone, human growth hormone and oxandrolone.

== Results ==
The inaugural 2026 Games featured 42 athletes competing across athletics, swimming, weightlifting, and strongman events. Because the Enhanced Games operate outside the jurisdiction of the World Anti-Doping Agency (WADA) and traditional sporting federations, records broken at the event were not officially recognized by governing bodies such as World Athletics or World Aquatics.

The event offered substantial financial incentives, including a $250,000 base prize for event winners and a $1 million bonus for breaking officially recognized world records. Athletes were permitted to compete as "enhanced" or "non-enhanced" competitors. Both 100-meter sprint winners, Fred Kerley and Tristan Evelyn, claimed to have competed without the use of performance-enhancing drugs, even submitting to testing by the United States Anti-Doping Agency (USADA) ahead of the event to prove their natural status.

In analysis for CBC News, Morgan Campbell said many of the performances at the 2026 Enhanced Games would not have caused a "ripple in international competition".

=== Athletics ===
Despite high expectations for record-breaking times, the track events were marred by multiple false starts and weaker-than-anticipated fields. Kerley won the men's 100-meter dash in 9.97 seconds, significantly slower than his personal best and the world record he had teased breaking. According to Morgan Campbell, most of the men competing "would have struggled against elite high schoolers". Mike Bryan's last-place time of 10.87 in the 100m "would have placed him fourth at the Toronto Catholic school board senior boys final" that year.

Athletics Results (Selected)
Event	World Record	First Place	Second Place	Third Place
Men's 100 m	9.58	Fred Kerley (USA); 9.97 (non-enhanced)	Emmanuel Matadi (LBR); 10.05	Marvin Bracy (USA); 10.39
Women's 100 m	10.49	Tristan Evelyn (BAR); 11.25 (non-enhanced)	Shania Collins (USA); 11.43	Taylor Anderson (USA); 11.48

=== Swimming ===
The swimming events produced the Games' only world-record-beating performance. Greek swimmer Kristian Gkolomeev finished the 50-meter freestyle in 20.81 seconds, undercutting the official world record of 20.88 set by Cameron McEvoy and earning the $1 million bonus. Megan Romano, aged 35, came second in the 50m freestyle using performance-enhancing substances, swimming faster than she had when competing at 22. Little-known swimmer Emily Barclay, who used performance-enhancing drugs, knocked 2 seconds off her personal best in the 100m freestyle, coming second. Conversely, former world champion James Magnussen, who was the first high-profile athlete to publicly sign onto the Games and pledge to use performance enhancers, flopped and finished last in the 100-meter freestyle final. In addition to the use of performance-enhancing drugs, swimmers were allowed to wear high-technology swimsuit designs, which were banned at World Aquatics events.

Swimming Results (Selected)
Event	World Record	First Place	Second Place	Third Place
Men's 50 m freestyle	20.88	Kristian Gkolomeev (GRE); 20.81 UW (Note: Unofficial World Record. Not recognized by World Aquatics due to non-compliance with WADA regulations.)	Ben Proud (GBR); 20.98	Andriy Govorov (UKR); 21.79
Men's 100 m freestyle	46.40	Kristian Gkolomeev (GRE); 46.60	Hunter Armstrong (USA); 48.09 (non-enhanced)	Shane Ryan (IRL); 48.92
Men's 50 m backstroke	23.55	Hunter Armstrong (USA); 24.21 (non-enhanced)	Shane Ryan (IRL); 25.23	Sohib Khaled (EGY); 25.68
Men's 50 m breaststroke	25.95	Cody Miller (USA); 26.55 (PB)	Felipe Lima (BRA); 26.98	Evgenii Somov (RUS); 27.21
Men's 100 m breaststroke	56.88	Cody Miller (USA); 59.47	Evgenii Somov (RUS); 59.61	Felipe Lima (BRA); 1:01.94
Men's 50 m butterfly	22.27	Ben Proud (GBR); 22.32 (PB)	Andriy Govorov (UKR); 22.66	Marius Kusch (GER); 22.92
Men's 100 m butterfly	49.45	Marius Kusch (GER); 51.28	Antani Ivanov (BUL); 51.61	Max McCusker (IRL); 51.78
Women's 50 m freestyle	23.61	Emily Barclay (GBR); 24.09 (PB)	Megan Romano (USA); 24.55	Isabella Arcila (COL); 25.12
Women's 100 m freestyle	51.71	Megan Romano (USA); 54.20	Emily Barclay (GBR); 54.67	Isabella Arcila (COL); 55.70

=== Weightlifting and Strongman ===
==== Weightlifting ====
Weightlifting Results (Selected)
Event	Class	World Record	Athlete	Best result
Women's Snatch	53 kg	99 kg	Beatriz Pirón (DOM)	N/A
Women's Snatch	86 kg	129 kg	Leydi Solís (COL)	100 kg
Women's Snatch	86+ kg	144 kg	Mariam Usman (NGA)	115 kg
Men's Snatch	79 kg	166 kg	Yoni Andica (COL)	135 kg
Men's Snatch	88 kg	181 kg	Arley Méndez (CHL)	155 kg
Men's Snatch	94 kg	182 kg	Boady Santavy (CAN)	177 kg
Men's Snatch	110 kg	196 kg	Wesley Kitts (USA)	185 kg (PB)
Women's Clean and Jerk	53 kg	126 kg	Beatriz Pirón (DOM)	118 kg (PB)
Women's Clean and Jerk	86 kg	162 kg	Leydi Solís (COL)	140 kg
Women's Clean and Jerk	86+ kg	181 kg	Mariam Usman (NGA)	N/A
Men's Clean and Jerk	79 kg	205 kg	Yoni Andica (COL)	170 kg
Men's Clean and Jerk	88 kg	220 kg	Arley Méndez (CHL)	N/A
Men's Clean and Jerk	94 kg	222 kg	Juan Solis (COL)	188 kg
Men's Clean and Jerk	110 kg	237 kg	Wesley Kitts (USA)	220 kg

==== Deadlift ====
Strongman competitors Hafthor Bjornsson and Mitchell Hooper competed in a deadlift showdown. Both men attempted to break the all-time world record of 510 kg (1,124 lbs) by calling for 515 kg (1,135 lbs) on their final lifts. Bjornsson secured the victory based on his successful second attempt of 475 kg, though both men ultimately failed their world record attempts in the final round.

Deadlift Showdown Results
Athlete	Attempt 1	Attempt 2	Attempt 3	Final Placement
Hafþór Júlíus Björnsson (ISL)	425 kg (Success)	475 kg (Success)	515 kg (Fail)	1st
Mitchell Hooper (CAN)	400 kg (Success)	440 kg (Success)	515 kg (Fail)	2nd

=== Personal bests ===
According to the Enhanced Games, 13 competitors achieved 21 personal bests during the 2026 Enhanced Games. Personal bests were achieved by both athletes on performance-enhancing drugs and those competing drug-free. Personal bests included:

Personal bests (Selected)
Athlete	Event	Personal best
Cody Miller (USA)	Men's 50m breaststroke	26.55
Kristian Gkolomeev (GRE)	Men's 100m freestyle	46.60
Kristian Gkolomeev (GRE)	Men's 50m freestyle	20.81 (UW)
Emily Barclay (GB)	Women's 50m freestyle	24.09
Ben Proud (GB)	Men's 50m fly	22.32
Beatriz Pirón (DOM)	Women's Clean and Jerk (53 kg)	118 kg
Dylan Cooper (USA)	Men's Clean and Jerk (110 kg)	205 kg
Wesley Kitts (USA)	Men's Snatch (110 kg)	185 kg

== Reactions ==
After winning the men's 100m, Fred Kerley, who competed without taking performance-enhancing drugs, said of the other competitors, "Man, they need to do better than that. They need to work a little bit harder, get on that shit a little bit more". Tristan Evelyn, who won the women's 100m and was also drug free, said, "This proves that winning takes more than chemistry". In response to Kristian Gkolomeev beating the men's 50m freestyle swimming world record by 0.07 seconds while on performance-enhancing drugs and wearing a race suit banned by swimming authorities, Cameron McEvoy, the holder of the official world record, posted on social media, "Seriously?! That’s all you got!"

Mainstream media generally described the inaugural Enhanced Games as a flop. For The Guardian's Sean Ingle, the "performances were mostly mediocre" and the results were "underwhelming". Morgan Campbell, in analysis for CBC News, said many of the performances at the 2026 Enhanced Games would not have caused a "ripple in international competition". Campbell added that most of the men competing "would have struggled against elite high schoolers", commenting that Mike Bryan's last-place time of 10.87 in the 100m "would have placed him fourth at the Toronto Catholic school board senior boys final" that year. As events were won by athletes who hadn't taken performance-enhancing drugs, Matt Yoder of Awful Announcing said it raised the question of "what the entire point of this thing actually is". Results like these, said the Associated Press, "force questions about both the effectiveness of performance enhancers and the level of the athletes who signed onto the league".

Sean Ingle predicted the Enhanced Games would likely fail over the following five years because, "while its movers and shakers are rich and smart, they don't come across as caring deeply about sport". He said the intention of the Enhanced Games is to "persuade potential customers their products are safe and will change your life". Carlos Arribas, for El País, described the event as a "glittering commercial enterprise and a mediocre sporting contest" and wrote of the "sales platform that underpins the Enhanced Games. A trivialization of doping and its health risks". Vic Tafur, writing in the The New York Times, said the main focus of the event was business and the sale of supplements to viewers. "The Enhanced Games now seemed less like a sporting event and more like a loss leader for selling" supplements, wrote Amit Katwala for MIT Technology Review. Quoted in the MIT Technology Review, Astrid Kristine Bjørnebekk, a steroids expert from Oslo University Hospital, said, "The games themselves now seem almost secondary to what appears to be an online marketplace for hormones, peptides, and other performance-enhancing compounds". Simon Smale of ABC News said, "As a no-expense-spared advertising festival to promote a brand whose goal is to sell performance-enhancing drugs to wannabe biohackers, it worked".

Following the event, the Enhanced Group Inc. share price dropped by 70%.

For some athletes, Simon Smale said, the event was about the prize money they could earn by competing. Smale said some athletes didn't make money for their success at the highest level, like Ben Proud, who had no financial reward for his silver at the 2024 Summer Olympics. At the 2026 Enhanced Games, Proud won $522,000, far more than the two grants combined he received in the run up to the two world championship gold medals he won. Morgan Campbell praised the "entrepreneurial spirit" of Tristan Evelyn, who competed drug-free, won the 100m with a mediocre time and took home $250,000. Commenting that many elite athletes are paid little for their successes and can struggle to pay for essentials like rent, Dr April Henning of Heriot-Watt University's Edinburgh Business School said that in the run up to the Enhanced Games the debate had focused on the use of drugs but had missed discussing the "financial reality that drove athletes" to participate. Henning advocated for greater involvement from athletes in deciding the rules of their sports. She also implied the Enhanced Games were exploiting these issues for its own gain, calling the company that organised the competition a "would-be pharmaceutical company with sharp marketing instincts and willingness to incentivise athletes".

In The BMJ, Ian Boardley, Professor of Sport and Exercise Psychology at the University of Birmingham, condemned the Enhanced Games for risking the health of the competing athletes and encouraging use in the public of dangerous substances, adding that the "limited performance gains make it even harder to justify the risk". Boardley said the organisers had used "jurisdictional and regulatory workarounds", such as enrolling athletes in a scientific study, to enable the use of risky substances. He said the methodology of the scientific study was weak and limited what could be learned and said "claims of advancing scientific knowledge were overstated" and misleading. In conclusion, he said:

The scientific, clinical, and ethical shortcomings of the Enhanced Games expose a fundamental contradiction. Although presented as a platform for innovation and discovery, their model is not grounded in an evidence base sufficient to ensure safety, predictability, or meaningful scientific insight. Rather than advancing knowledge, the Enhanced Games risk legitimising potentially harmful practices under the guise of regulation and progress.
