= Liberia at the 2019 African Games =

- Flag of Liberia
- IOC code: LBR
- NOC: Liberia National Olympic Committee

in Rabat, Morocco 19 August 2019 – 31 August 2019
- Competitors: 3 (3 men and 0 women) in 3 sports and 3 events
- Medals: Gold 0 Silver 0 Bronze 0 Total 0

African Games appearances
- 2011; 2015; 2019; 2023

Liberia competed at the 2019 African Games held from 19 to 31 August 2019 in Rabat, Morocco.

They competed in three sports with a single individual representing them at each set of events.

== Athletics ==
Through the Liberia Athletics Federation, at least seven athletes sought funds from the government of Liberia to receive help participating in the games under the country's flag. The federation requested an amount of twenty thousand dollars (USD). Among the athletes, five are based in the United States, while Andrew Kpehe is based in China. As the lone woman athlete seeking to compete for the country, Nancy Saah stood out in her request to represent Liberia in the women's 100- and 200-meter sprints. In total, the team would have competed in at least eight events between them including the men's 4×100 relay.

Among the sprinters, only hurdler Welington Zaza represented his native country of Liberia at the games in the field of athletics. In the men's 110-meter hurdles event, he ultimately finished in fourth place with a time of 14.10 seconds. Zaza previously was a college athlete for Auburn University.

== Shooting ==
Wilfred Freddie Browne was scheduled to represent Liberia in the Men's skeet event but ultimately he did not compete.

== Weightlifting ==
In the men's 55 kg weightlifting event, Gee Thomas Garwo Jr. represented Liberia.
