= Shania Collins =

American sprinter (born 1996)

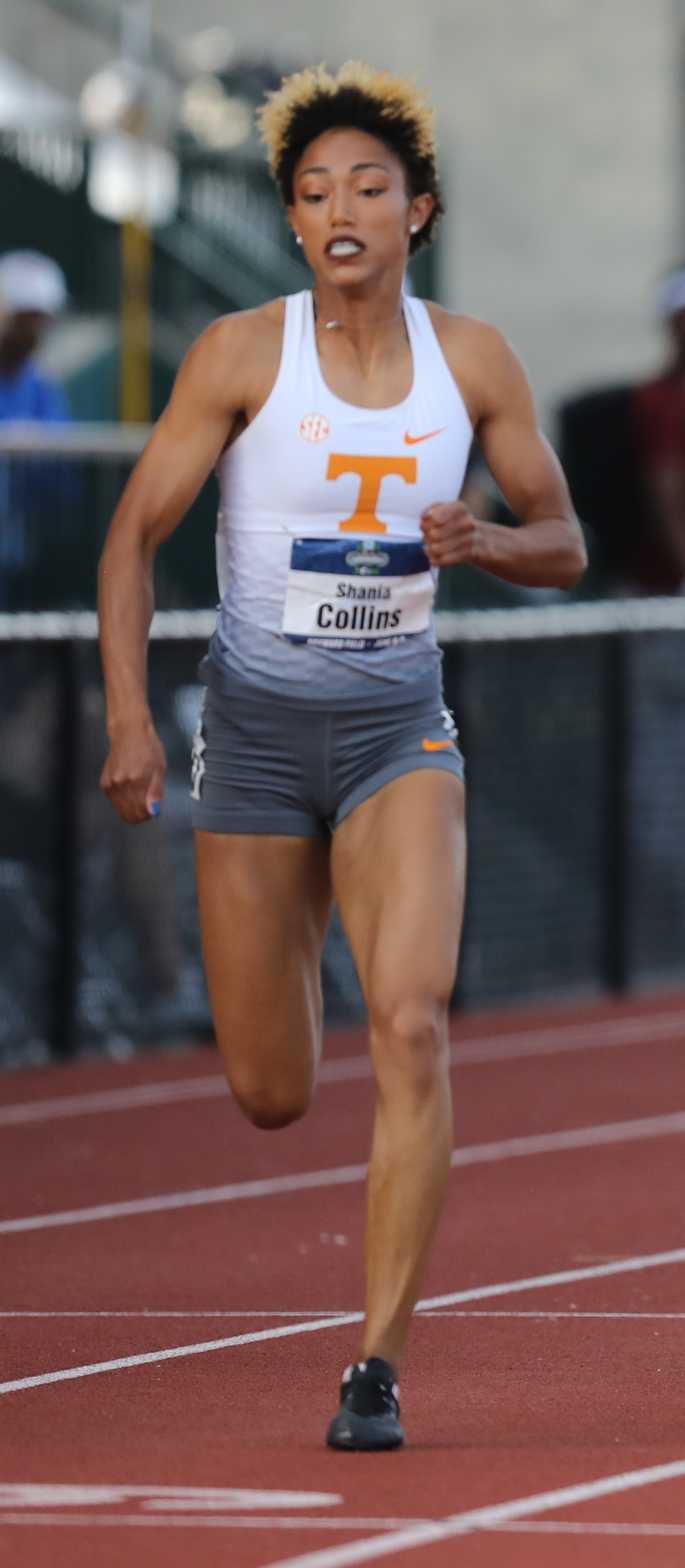
- Collins in 2018

Personal information
- Nationality: American
- Born: November 14, 1996 (age 29)

Sport
- Sport: Athletics
- Event: Sprinting
- Club: Adidas
Medal record
Women's athletics
Representing Liberia
African Games
Silver medal – second place	2023 Accra	4 × 100 m relay
Representing the United States
Pan American Games
Bronze medal – third place	2019 Lima	4 × 100 m relay
NACAC Championships in Athletics
Gold medal – first place	2018 Toronto	4 × 100 m relay
USA Indoor Championships
Gold medal – first place	2019 Staten Island	60 m

Shania Collins (born November 14, 1996) is an American athlete. In February 2019, she won the gold medal in the 60 meters event at the 2019 USA Indoor Track and Field Championships.

== Professional ==
Collins competed for Puma and Adidas. She retired from professional track and field in 2024 to pursue a career at the Drug Enforcement Administration. She competed in the 2026 Enhanced Games.

Year	Competition	Venue	Position	Event	Notes
Representing the United States
2019	2019 IAAF World Relays	Yokohama, Japan	3rd DQ	4 × 200 metres relay	DQ
2018	NACAC Championships	Toronto, Canada	1st	4 × 100 metres relay	42.50
Representing Adidas
2019	2019 USA Indoor Track and Field Championships	Staten Island, New York	1st	60 metres	7.16
Representing Tennessee Volunteers
2018	2018 USA Outdoor Track and Field Championships	Des Moines, Iowa	4th	200 metres	23.08
2018	2018 USA Outdoor Track and Field Championships	Des Moines, Iowa	7th	100 metres	11.21
Representing Texas Longhorns
2015	USATF Junior Championships	Eugene, Oregon	6th	200 metres	24.11
2015	USATF Junior Championships	Eugene, Oregon	10th	100 metres	12.01

== NCAA Track Major meet results ==
Collins graduated from University of Tennessee and signed with Adidas in 2018.

Year	Competition	Venue	Position	Event	Notes
Representing University of Tennessee
2018	2018 NCAA Division I Outdoor Track and Field Championships	Eugene, Oregon	5th	100 metres	11.41
2018	2018 NCAA Division I Outdoor Track and Field Championships	Eugene, Oregon	8th	200 metres	24.01
2018	2018 NCAA Division I Outdoor Track and Field Championships	Eugene, Oregon	9th	4 × 100 metres	43.48
2018	Southeastern Conference Outdoor Track and Field Championships	Knoxville, Tennessee	2nd	100 metres	10.99
2018	Southeastern Conference Outdoor Track and Field Championships	Knoxville, Tennessee	2nd	200 metres	22.47
2018	Southeastern Conference Outdoor Track and Field Championships	Knoxville, Tennessee	6th	4 × 100 metres	43.30
2018	Southeastern Conference Outdoor Track and Field Championships	Knoxville, Tennessee	4th	4 × 400 metres	3:28.96
2018	Mt. SAC Relays	Torrance, California	2nd	200 metres	23.36
2018	2018 NCAA Division I Indoor Track and Field Championships	College Station, Texas	12th	4 × 400 metres	3:33.79
2018	2018 NCAA Division I Indoor Track and Field Championships	College Station, Texas	14th	200 metres	23.28
2018	Southeastern Conference Indoor track and field Championships	College Station, Texas	13th	60 metres	7.34
2018	Southeastern Conference Indoor track and field Championships	College Station, Texas	11th	200 metres	23.23
2018	Southeastern Conference Indoor track and field Championships	College Station, Texas	2nd	4 × 400 metres	3:31.48
2017	2017 NCAA Division I Outdoor Track and Field Championships	Eugene, Oregon	16th	200 metres	23.40
2017	Southeastern Conference Outdoor Track and Field Championships	Columbia, South Carolina	10th	100 metres	11.34
2017	Southeastern Conference Outdoor Track and Field Championships	Columbia, South Carolina	9th	200 metres	23.76
2017	Southeastern Conference Outdoor Track and Field Championships	Columbia, South Carolina	6th	4 × 100 metres	44.27
2017	Southeastern Conference Indoor Track and Field Championships	Nashville, Tennessee	10th	60 metres	7.36
2017	Southeastern Conference Indoor Track and Field Championships	Nashville, Tennessee	9th	200 metres	23.51
2017	Southeastern Conference Indoor Track and Field Championships	Nashville, Tennessee	7th	4 × 400 metres	3:39.04
Representing University of Texas
2016	Texas Relays	Austin, Texas	13th	200 metres	24.28
2016	Tyson Invitational	Fayetteville, Arkansas	35th	200 metres	24.45
2015	2015 NCAA Division I Outdoor Track and Field Championships	Eugene, Oregon	4th	4 × 100 metres	43.38
2015	Big 12 Conference Outdoor Track and Field Championships	Ames, Iowa	11th	100 metres	11.67
2015	Big 12 Conference Outdoor Track and Field Championships	Ames, Iowa	8th	200 metres	24.02
2015	Big 12 Conference Indoor Track and Field Championships	Ames, Iowa	8th	60 metres	7.57
2015	Big 12 Conference Indoor Track and Field Championships	Ames, Iowa	8th	200 metres	24.54

== Prep ==
Collins graduated from Huntingtown High School as a 8-time Maryland Public Secondary Schools Athletic Association state champion.

Representing Huntingtown High School at MPSSAA 3A state championship
Year	Indoor Track	Outdoor Track
2014	4 × 400 m 2nd 4:12.12	
2014	4 × 200 m 3rd 1:47.13	4 × 200 3rd 1:44.38
2014	300 m 1st 39.29	200 m 1st 23.97
2014	55 m 1st 7.01	100 m 1st 11.81
2013	4 × 200 m 1st 1:46.23	
2013	300 m 3rd 41.05	200 m 1st 24.64
2013	55 m 3rd 7.28	100 m 2nd 12.10
2012	400 m 5th 58.12	4 × 400 m 2nd 4:12.12
2012	4 × 200 m 4th 1:47.37	4 × 200 2nd 1:43.40
2012	300 m 10th 42.58	4 × 100 m 3rd 49.38
2012	55 m 1st 7.01	200 m 1st 25.02
2011		400 m 5th 58.12
2011		4 × 200 m 2nd 1:41.97
2011		4 × 400 m 14th 4:17.28
Representing Huntingtown Track Club
New Balance Indoor Nationals
2014	200 m 1st 23.82	
2014	60 m 4th 7.46	
USATF National Junior Olympic Track & Field Championships
2013		200 m 12th 24.53
2013		4 × 100 m 1st 45.24
2012		200 m 11th 25.36
New Balance Nationals Outdoor
2011		400 m 3rd 58.13
2011		4 × 400 m 9th 1:41.02
