= Ebony Morrison =

American hurdler (born 1994)

Ebony Morrison OLY
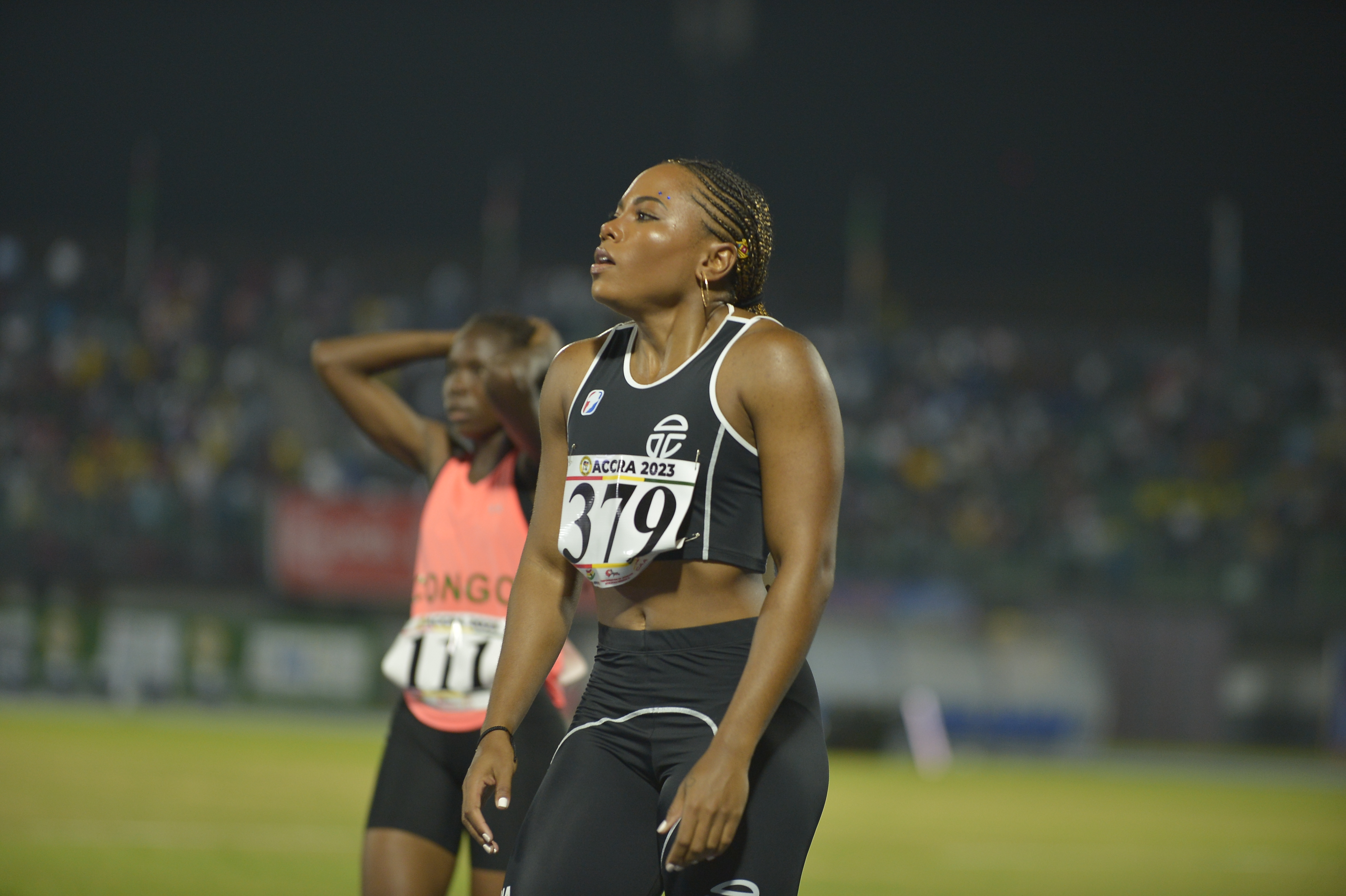

Personal information
- Full name: Ebony Leea Morrison
- Born: December 28, 1994 (age 31)
- Education: University of Miami
- Height: 5’5

Sport
- Sport: Athletics
- Event: 100 meters hurdles
- Turned pro: 2018
Medal record
Women's Athletics
Representing Liberia
African Games
Silver medal – second place	2023 Accra	4×100 m relay
African Championships
Gold medal – first place	2024 Douala	100 m hurdles
Silver medal – second place	2022 Mauritius	100 m hurdles
Bronze medal – third place	2024 Douala	4×100 m relay

Ebony Leea Morrison OLY (born 28 December 1994) is an American-born Liberian track and field athlete, specializing in the 100 meters hurdles. At the Tokyo 2020 Summer Olympics, she ran a time of 12.74 in the women's 100m hurdles advancing to the semi finals. She also competed at the Paris 2024 Summer Olympics.

Morrison transferred her allegiance for international athletics from the United States to Liberia in 2021.

== Career ==
Morrison attended Auburn University before transferring in 2014–2015 to the University of Miami where she studied film and media studies. At Miami, she competed in the women's 60m and 100m hurdles.

Morrison was one of three competitors representing Liberia at the 2020 Olympics, along with sprinters Joseph Fahnbulleh and Emmanuel Matadi. She and Fahnbulleh carried the Liberian flag in the Parade of Nations in the opening ceremony. The team's outfits were designed by Liberian-American designer Telfar Clemens.

Morrison earned a spot on Team Liberia for the 2024 Summer Olympics and ran in the women's 100m hurdles competition in Paris, France. She ran a 12.93 in Serie 2 and later competed in the Repechage Round, where she placed first in her heat with a time of 12.82 .

== Personal life ==
Morrison grew up in Miami, Florida, United States. She attended Robert Morgan Educational Center and competed for both Killian and Southridge High School. She Attended Auburn University, where she earned a full-ride scholarship for track and field. She also received another full-ride scholarship to continue her pursuit of athletics at the University of Miami where she earned a degree in Motion Picture Production with a minor in Theatre.

Olympic Games
Preceded by Emmanuel Matadi	Flag bearer for Liberia; Tokyo 2020 with Joseph Fahnbulleh	Succeeded by Thelma Davies; Emmanuel Matadi
