= Blessing Ogundiran =

Nigerian athlete (born 1999)

Personal information
- Nationality: Nigerian
- Born: 11 November 1999 (age 26)

Sport
- Sport: Athletics
- Event: Sprinter

Achievements and titles
- Personal bests: 60m: 7.28 (2026); 100m: 10.98 (2026); 200m: 24.73 (2021)
Medal record
Women's athletics
Representing Nigeria
African Games
Gold medal – first place	2023 Accra	4x100 m relay

Blessing Ogundiran (born 11 November 1999) is a Nigerian sprinter. She was the Nigerian champion in 2023 over 100 metres and represented Nigeria at the 2023 African Games.

== Biography ==
Ogundiran ran 11.54 seconds for the 100 metres as a teenager in 2017. The following year, she lowered her personal best to 11.48 seconds in Abuja.

She became the 2023 Nigerian national 100 metres champion in Benin City, running 11.50 seconds in the final to win ahead of Faith Okwose. She was part of the gold medal winning women's 4 x 100 metres relay at the delayed 2023 African Games in Accra in March 2024. In May 2024, she won the 100 metres at the MTN Champs event in Calabar with a time of 11.55 seconds.

Competing in the United States for Warner University in the National Association of Intercollegiate Athletics (NAIA) in January 2026, she ran a new personal best and school record to win the 60 metres at the Jimmy Carnes Invitational in Florida. She then won the NAIA Indoor Track and Field Championships over 60 metres in Gainesville, Florida.

In April 2026, she set a new school record for Warner University and a NAIA 100 metres record at the Embry-Riddle Classic, running 11.21s (+0.5). The following week at the South Florida Invitational she ran a new record and personal best time of 10.98s (+0.6) in the women’s 100 m. In doing so, she became the ninth Nigeria woman to break the 11-second barrier for the distance. She was named as part of the Nigerian team for the 2026 World Athletics Relays in Gaborone, Botswana.

In June 2026, Ogundiran emerged as the Nigerian national champion in the 100m, running 11.12 seconds (-0.5m/s) in the final at the Nigerian national trials. The event was held at the Yaba College of Technology Sports Complex. At the 2026 Commonwealth Games in Glasgow, she received a bye into the 100 metres semi-finals but did not start due to health issues.

== Personal life ==
She is from Oshodi, Lagos.
