= Rosemary Chukwuma =

Nigerian sprinter (born 2001)

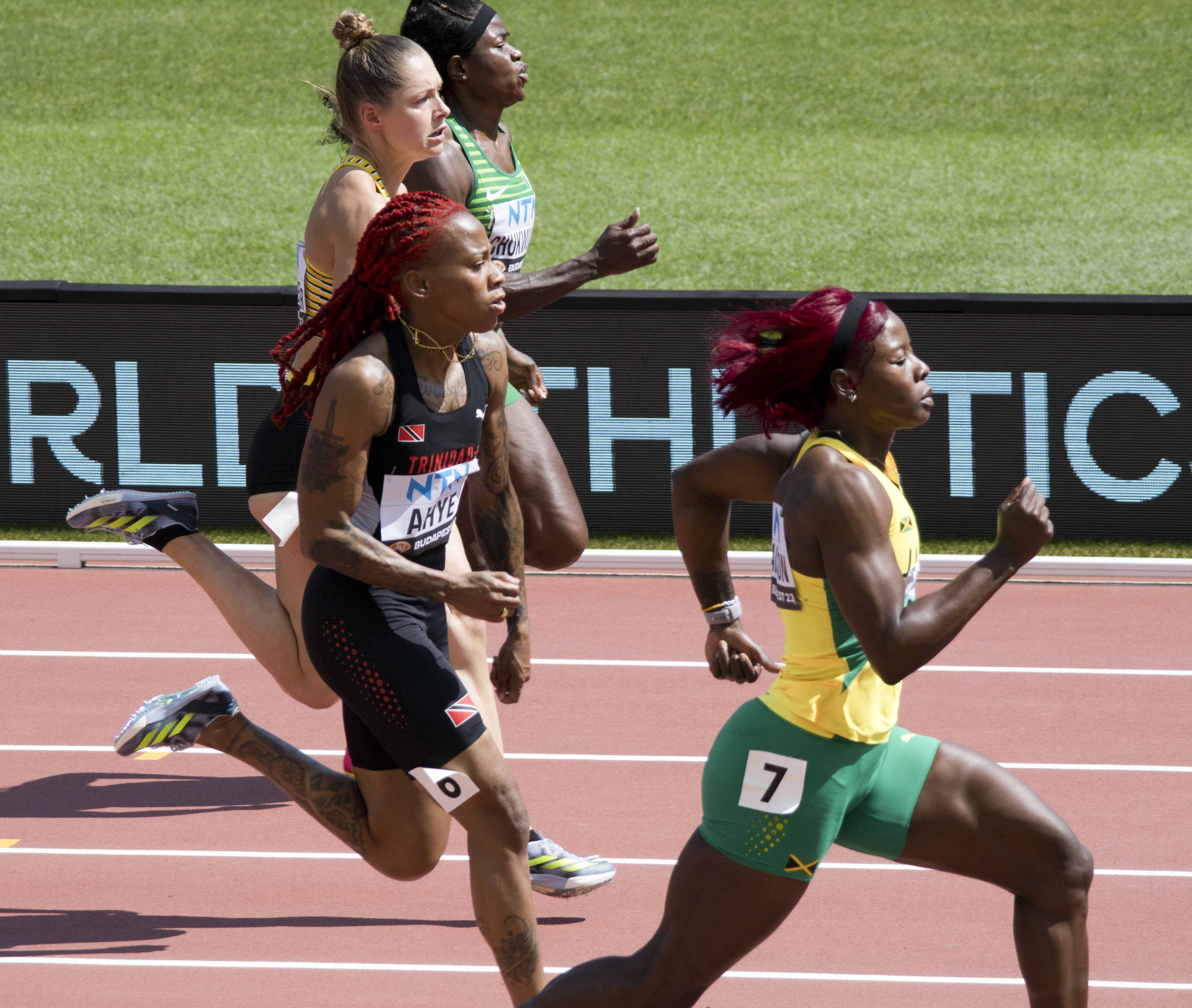
- Rosemary Chukwuma (in the green top) in 2023

Personal information
- Born: 5 December 2001 (age 24) Ekwashi, Ebonyi State, Nigeria

Sport
- Sport: Athletics
- Event: Sprints
- College team: South Plains Texans (2020–2021)

Achievements and titles
- Personal bests: 100 m: 10.88 (2024); 200 m: 22.33 (2022)
Medal record
Women's athletics
Representing Nigeria
African Games
| Gold medal – first place | 2019 Rabat | 4×100 m |
African Championships
| Gold medal – first place | 2018 Asaba | 4×100 m |
| Gold medal – first place | 2026 Accra | 4×100 m |
| Silver medal – second place | 2026 Accra | 100 m |
| Silver medal – second place | 2026 Accra | 200 m |
Commonwealth Games
| Bronze medal – third place | 2018 Gold Coast | 4×100 m |
African U20 Championships
| Gold medal – first place | 2019 Abidjan | 100 m |
| Gold medal – first place | 2019 Abidjan | 200 m |
| Gold medal – first place | 2019 Abidjan | 4×100 m relay |
Youth Olympic Games
| Gold medal – first place | 2018 Buenos Aires | 100 m |
African Youth Games
| Gold medal – first place | 2018 Algiers | 100 m |
| Gold medal – first place | 2018 Algiers | 200 m |

Rosemary Chukwuma (born 5 December 2001) is a Nigerian sprinter. She won a bronze medal in the 4 × 100 metres relay at the 2018 Commonwealth Games as well as a gold medal in the 4 × 100 metres relay at the 2019 African Games. In 2018, she won a gold medal in the 100 metres at the Summer Youth Olympics, clocking 11.17 seconds.

== Career ==
Rosemary Chukwuma gained her first international experience at the 2018 Commonwealth Games in Gold Coast, Australia where she won a bronze medal behind the teams from England and Jamaica with the Nigerian 4 × 100 m relay team in 42.75 seconds. In the summer she won a gold medal with the 4 × 100 m relay team at the 2018 African Championships in Asaba but did not start over the 200 m event. Earlier, she won double gold at the 2018 African Youth Games in Algiers over 100 m and 200 m and thus qualified for the Summer Youth Olympics in Buenos Aires, where she won the 100 m gold medal.

In 2019, she won triple gold at the Junior African Championships in Abidjan with 11.62 seconds and 23.81 seconds finishes over 100 m and 200 m respectively, and in 45.56 seconds with the Nigerian 4 × 100 m relay team. In early May, she ran in the 4 × 100 m relay for Nigeria at the IAAF World Relays in Yokohama with 45.07 seconds in the first round. Then she took part in the African Games for the first time in Rabat and reached the final of the 200 m, where she did not start. She also won gold with the Nigerian relay team in 44.16 seconds.

Chukwuma competed for the Texas Tech Red Raiders track and field team in the NCAA.

Competing at the 2026 African Championships in Accra, Ghana, she claimed silver medals in both the 100 and 200 metres. In the women's relay, she also helped Team Nigeria secure their fourth consecutive gold medal. Chukwuma received a bye to next stage of 100 meteres at the 2026 Commonwealth Games in Glasgow but suffered an injury in the semi-final. She struggled to finish the race, clocking 11.82 seconds to place eighth.

== Athletics achievements ==
Information from her World Athletics profile unless otherwise noted.

=== Personal bests ===
| Type | Distance | Time (s) | Wind (m/s) | Venue | Date | Notes |
Individual events
| Indoor | 60 metres | 7.09 | —N/a | Lubbock, United States | 27 January 2023 | |
| Indoor | 200 metres sh | 22.68 | —N/a | Lubbock, United States | 25 February 2023 | |
| Outdoor | 100 metres | 10.88 | +1.2 | Fayetteville, United States | 25 May 2024 | |
| Outdoor | 200 metres | 22.33 | +2.0 | Lubbock, United States | 15 May 2022 | |
Team events
| Indoor | 4 × 400 metres relay sh | 3:39.66 | —N/a | Lubbock, United States | 20 January 2024 | |
| Outdoor | 4 × 100 metres relay | 42.22 | —N/a | Eugene, United States | 23 July 2022 | NR |
| Outdoor | 4 × 100 metres relay | 42.22 | —N/a | Baton Rouge, United States | 26 April 2025 | |

=== International competitions ===
Representing Nigeria
| Year | Competition | Venue | Position | Event | Time | Notes |
|---|---|---|---|---|---|---|
| 2017 | World U18 Championships | Nairobi, Kenya | — | 100 m | DNS | |
| 2018 | Commonwealth Games | Gold Coast, Australia | 3rd | 4 x 100 m relay | 42.75 | |
| 2018 | African Youth Games | Algiers, Algeria | 1st | 100 m | 11.53 | |
| 2018 | African Youth Games | Algiers, Algeria | 1st | 200 m | 23.45 | |
| 2018 | Youth Olympic Games | Buenos Aires, Argentina | 1st | 100 m | 11.17 | |
| 2019 | African U20 Championships | Abidjan, Ivory Coast | 1st | 100 m | 11.62 | |
| 2019 | African U20 Championships | Abidjan, Ivory Coast | 1st | 200 m | 23.81 | |
| 2019 | World Relays | Yokohama, Japan | 17th (h) | 4 x 100 m relay | 45.07 | SB |
| 2019 | African Games | Rabat, Morocco | — | 200 m | DNS | |
| 2019 | African Games | Rabat, Morocco | 1st | 4 x 100 m relay | 44.16 | |
| 2019 | World Championships | Doha, Qatar | 10th (h) | 4 x 100 m relay | 43.05 | SB |
| 2022 | World Championships | Eugene, United States | 15th (sf) | 200 m | 22.72 | |
| 2022 | World Championships | Eugene, United States | 4th | 4 x 100 m relay | 42.22 | AR |
| 2022 | Commonwealth Games | Birmingham, United Kingdom | 4th | 100 m | 11.17 | |
| 2022 | Commonwealth Games | Birmingham, United Kingdom | — | 4 x 100 m relay | DQ | 41.1 |
| 2023 | World Championships | Budapest, Hungary | 22nd (sf) | 100 m | 11.26 | |
| 2023 | World Championships | Budapest, Hungary | — | 4 x 100 m relay | DNF | |
| 2024 | African Championships | Douala, Cameroon | 16th (sf) | 100 m | 11.79 | |
| 2024 | Olympic Games | Paris, France | 26th (sf) | 100 m | 11.39 | |
| 2024 | Olympic Games | Paris, France | 9th (h) | 4 x 100 m relay | 42.70 | SB |
| 2025 | World Championships | Tokyo, Japan | 27th (h) | 100 m | 11.27 | |
| 2026 | African Championships | Accra, Ghana | 2nd | 100 m | 11.49 | |
| 2026 | African Championships | Accra, Ghana | 2nd | 200 m | 23.60 | |
| 2026 | Commonwealth Games | Glasgow, United Kingdom | 23rd (sf) | 100 m | 11.82 | |
