= Gladys Boateng =

Ghanaian politician

Member of Parliament for Tema west constituency
- In office 1993-01-07 – 1997-01-07
- President: Jerry John Rawlings
- Preceded by: Seth Laryea Tetteh
- Succeeded by: Abraham Ossei-Aidooh

Personal details
- Born: 2 June 1949 (age 77)
- Party: National Democratic Congress
- Education: Cert 'A' Specialist Training College
- Occupation: Politician
- Profession: Teacher

Gladys Boateng (born 1949) is a Ghanaian politician and also a teacher. She served as a member of parliament for Tema west constituency in Greater Accra Region of Ghana in the First Parliament of the Fourth Republic of Ghana.

== Early life and education ==
Gladys Boateng was born on 2 June 1949. She has a diploma in Art Education at Cert 'A' Specialist Training College.

== Career ==
Gladys Boateng was a former member of the First Parliament of the Fourth Republic of Ghana. She was sworn into office on 7 January 1993 and served till 6th January 1997.

== Politics ==
Gladys Boateng was elected into parliament during the 1992 Ghanaian parliamentary election on the ticket of the National Democratic Congress as a member of the First Parliament of the Fourth Republic of Ghana.

She was preceded by Seth Laryea Tetteh who was the Member of Parliament for Tema in the 3rd Republic of Ghana and was succeeded by Abraham Ossei-Aidooh of the New Patriotic Party in 1996 Ghanaian general election who won the election with 22,521 votes which is equivalent to 46.50% of the share by defeating Esther Ilan-Agbodo Ogbogu of the National Democratic Congress who obtained 15,511 votes which is equivalent to 32.00% of the share and George Alfred Ackah of Convention People's Party who obtained no votes.

== Personal life ==
Gladys Boateng is a Christian.
