= 2018 African Championships in Athletics – Men's decathlon =

The men's decathlon event at the 2018 African Championships in Athletics was held on 2 and 3 August in Asaba, Nigeria.

== Medalists ==
Gold	Silver	Bronze
Larbi Bourrada; Algeria	Fredriech Pretorius; South Africa	Samuel Osadolor; Nigeria

== Results ==
=== 100 metres ===
Wind: -0.2 m/s

Rank	Lane	Name	Nationality	Time	Points	Notes
1	3	Samuel Osadolor	Nigeria	10.72	924	
2	7	Larbi Bourrada	Algeria	10.94	874	
3	1	Peter Moreno	Nigeria	11.04	852	
4	2	Fredriech Pretorius	South Africa	11.27	801	
5	6	Gilbert Koech	Kenya	11.33	789	
6	5	Duncan McGladdery	South Africa	11.35	784	
7	4	Fabrice Rajah	Mauritius	12.00	651	

=== Long jump ===
Rank	Athlete	Nationality	#1	#2	#3	Result	Points	Notes	Total
1	Fredriech Pretorius	South Africa	x	7.48	7.51	7.51	937		1738
2	Larbi Bourrada	Algeria	x	7.41w	x	7.41w	913		1787
3	Peter Moreno	Nigeria	6.44	6.83	6.60	6.83	774		1626
4	Samuel Osadolor	Nigeria	6.81	6.60	x	6.81	769		1693
5	Gilbert Koech	Kenya	x	6.61	6.80	6.80	767		1556
6	Fabrice Rajah	Mauritius	x	6.22	6.57	6.57	713		1364
7	Duncan McGladdery	South Africa	x	x	6.52	6.52	702		1487

=== Shot put ===
Rank	Athlete	Nationality	#1	#2	#3	Result	Points	Notes	Total
1	Fredriech Pretorius	South Africa				13.81	717		2455
2	Fabrice Rajah	Mauritius				13.14	676		2040
3	Larbi Bourrada	Algeria				12.81	656		2443
4	Gilbert Koech	Kenya				12.68	648		2204
5	Duncan McGladdery	South Africa				12.48	636		2123
6	Samuel Osadolor	Nigeria				11.84	597		2290
7	Peter Moreno	Nigeria				11.66	586		2212

=== High jump ===
Rank	Athlete	Nationality	1.70	1.73	1.76	1.79	1.82	1.85	1.88	1.91	1.94	1.97	2.00	2.03	2.06	2.09	Result	Points	Notes	Total
1	Larbi Bourrada	Algeria	–	–	–	–	–	–	–	o	o	xo	xxo	xo	xo	xx	2.06	859		3302
2	Fredriech Pretorius	South Africa	–	–	–	–	–	–	o	–	o	xo	xo	xxx			2.00	803		3258
3	Duncan McGladdery	South Africa	–	–	–	o	–	o	xo	xo	o	?					1.94	749		2872
4	Peter Moreno	Nigeria	–	–	–	o	–	xxo	o	o	xxx						1.91	723		2935
5	Fabrice Rajah	Mauritius	–	–	–	o	o	o	xo	xo	xx						1.91	723		2763
6	Samuel Osadolor	Nigeria	o	–	o	–	xxo	xxo	o	xxx							1.88	696		2986
7	Gilbert Koech	Kenya	o	o	xo	o	o	xxx									1.82	644		2848

=== 400 metres ===
Rank	Lane	Name	Nationality	Time	Points	Notes	Total
1	8	Larbi Bouraada	Algeria	48.39	890		4192
2	7	Samuel Osadolor	Nigeria	48.86	868		3854
3	2	Peter Moreno	Nigeria	49.42	842		3777
4	4	Gilbert Koech	Kenya	49.48	839		3687
5	6	Duncan McGladdery	South Africa	50.72	782		3654
6	3	Fredriech Pretorius	South Africa	51.23	759		4017
7	5	Fabrice Rajah	Mauritius	53.37	666		3429

=== 110 metres hurdles ===
Wind: ? m/s

Rank	Name	Nationality	Time	Points	Notes	Total
1	Samuel Osadolor	Nigeria	14.08	964		4818
2	Peter Moreno	Nigeria	14.43	920		4697
3	Larbi Bouraada	Algeria	14.70	886		5078
4	Fredriech Pretorius	South Africa	14.97	853		4870
5	Gilbert Koech	Kenya	15.51	789		4476
6	Fabrice Rajah	Mauritius	15.63	775		4204
7	Duncan McGladdery	South Africa	16.26	704		4357

=== Discus throw ===
Rank	Athlete	Nationality	#1	#2	#3	Result	Points	Notes	Total
1	Larbi Bouraada	Algeria	38.48	40.27	36.80	40.27	670		5748
2	Fredriech Pretorius	South Africa	?	38.63	?	39.88	662		5532
3	Fabrice Rajah	Mauritius	?	37.98	37.43	37.98	624		4828
4	Duncan McGladdery	South Africa	36.13	x	37.64	37.64	617		4974
5	Samuel Osadolor	Nigeria	x	35.64	37.41	37.41	612		5430
6	Peter Moreno	Nigeria	?	36.55	?	36.57	595		5292
7	Gilbert Koech	Kenya	36.30	35.81	?	36.30	590		5066

=== Pole vault ===
Rank	Athlete	Nationality	3.00	3.20	3.30	3.40	3.50	3.80	4.00	4.20	4.30	4.40	4.50	4.60	4.70	4.80	Result	Points	Notes	Total
1	Larbi Bouraada	Algeria	–	–	–	–	–	–	–	–	o	–	o	o	o	xxx	4.70	819		6567
2	Fredriech Pretorius	South Africa	–	–	–	–	–	–	–	–	–	–	–	o	–	xxx	4.60	790		6322
3	Fabrice Rajah	Mauritius	–	–	–	–	o	o	o	o	xo	xxo	xo	o	xxx		4.60	790		5618
4	Peter Moreno	Nigeria	–	–	–	–	–	–	o	o	–	o	–	xxx			4.40	731		6023
5	Duncan McGladdery	South Africa	–	–	–	–	–	–	–	xo	–	o	–	xxx			4.40	731		5705
6	Samuel Osadolor	Nigeria	–	xo	–	xxo	xxx										3.40	457		5887
7	Gilbert Koech	Kenya	o	o	xo	xxx											3.30	431		5497

=== Javelin throw ===
Rank	Athlete	Nationality	#1	#2	#3	Result	Points	Notes	Total
1	Larbi Bouraada	Algeria				66.87	842		7409
2	Duncan McGladdery	South Africa				61.21	756		6461
3	Fredriech Pretorius	South Africa				59.84	735		7057
4	Gilbert Koech	Kenya				57.08	694		6191
5	Fabrice Rajah	Mauritius				54.47	655		6274
6	Samuel Osadolor	Nigeria				47.83	557		6444
7	Peter Moreno	Nigeria				40.73	453		6476

=== 1500 metres ===
Rank	Name	Nationality	Time	Points	Notes
1	Gilbert Koech	Kenya	4:24.11	784	
2	Larbi Bouraada	Algeria	4:38.42	690	
3	Fredriech Pretorius	South Africa	4:41.16	673	
4	Samuel Osadolor	Nigeria	4:44.76	651	
5	Fabrice Rajah	Mauritius	4:45.41	647	
6	Peter Moreno	Nigeria	4:59.41	563	
7	Duncan McGladdery	South Africa	5:03.48	540	

=== Final standings ===
The highest mark recorded in each event is highlighted in yellow

Rank	Athlete	Nationality	100m	LJ	SP	HJ	400m	110m H	DT	PV	JT	1500m	Points	Notes
1st place, gold medalist(s)	Larbi Bourrada	Algeria	10.94	7.41w	12.81	2.06	48.39	14.70	40.27	4.70	66.87	4:38.42	8099	
2nd place, silver medalist(s)	Fredriech Pretorius	South Africa	11.27	7.51	13.81	2.00	51.23	14.97	39.88	4.60	59.84	4:41.16	7730	
3rd place, bronze medalist(s)	Samuel Osadolor	Nigeria	10.72	6.81	11.84	1.88	48.86	14.08	37.41	3.40	47.83	4:44.76	7095	
4	Peter Moreno	Nigeria	11.04	6.83	11.66	1.91	49.42	14.43	36.57	4.40	40.73	4:59.41	7039	
5	Duncan McGladdery	South Africa	11.35	6.52	12.48	1.94	50.72	16.26	37.64	4.40	61.21	5:03.48	7001	
6	Gilbert Koech	Kenya	11.33	6.80	12.68	1.82	49.48	15.51	36.30	3.30	57.08	4:24.11	6975	
7	Fabrice Rajah	Mauritius	12.00	6.57	13.14	1.91	53.37	15.63	37.98	4.60	54.47	4:45.41	6920	
