= Olayinka Olajide =

Nigerian athlete (born 2002)

Personal information
- Nationality: Nigerian
- Born: 28 October 2002 (age 23)

Sport
- Sport: Athletics
- Event: Sprinter

Achievements and titles
- Personal bests: 60m: 7.50 (Lagos, 2024); 100m: 11.19 (Asaba, 2024); 200m: 23.18 (Accra, 2024); 400m: 55.35 (Lagos, 2024)
Medal record
Women's athletics
Representing Nigeria
African Games
Gold medal – first place	2023 Accra	4x100 m relay
Silver medal – second place	2023 Accra	200 m
Bronze medal – third place	2023 Accra	100 m
African Championships
Gold medal – first place	2024 Douala	4×100 m relay

Olayinka Olajide (born 28 October 2002) is a Nigerian sprinter. In 2024, she won three medals at the African Games.

== Biography ==
In February 2024, she won the Nigerian African Games trials in Asaba running a personal best over 200 metres of 22.34 seconds. She also triumphed in the 100 metres at the event, running a personal best time of 11.19 seconds.

At the 2023 African Games she won a bronze medal in the 100 metres, as well as a silver medal in the 200 metres and a gold in the 4x100m metres relay. She won the bronze in the women's 100 metres on 19 March 2024, with a time of 11.55 seconds. On 22 March she won a silver medal in the women's 200 metres, in a personal best time of 23.18 seconds. She returned to the track on the same day to win gold as part of the Nigerian women's 4x100m relay team.

In July 2024, she was officially named as part of the Nigerian team for the 2024 Paris Olympics.

In July 2026, she was a semi-finalist in the 200 metres at the 2026 Commonwealth Games in Glasgow, Scotland. Later at the Games, she also competed in the women's 4 × 100 m relay.
