= Thelma Davies =

Liberian-American sprinter (born 2000)

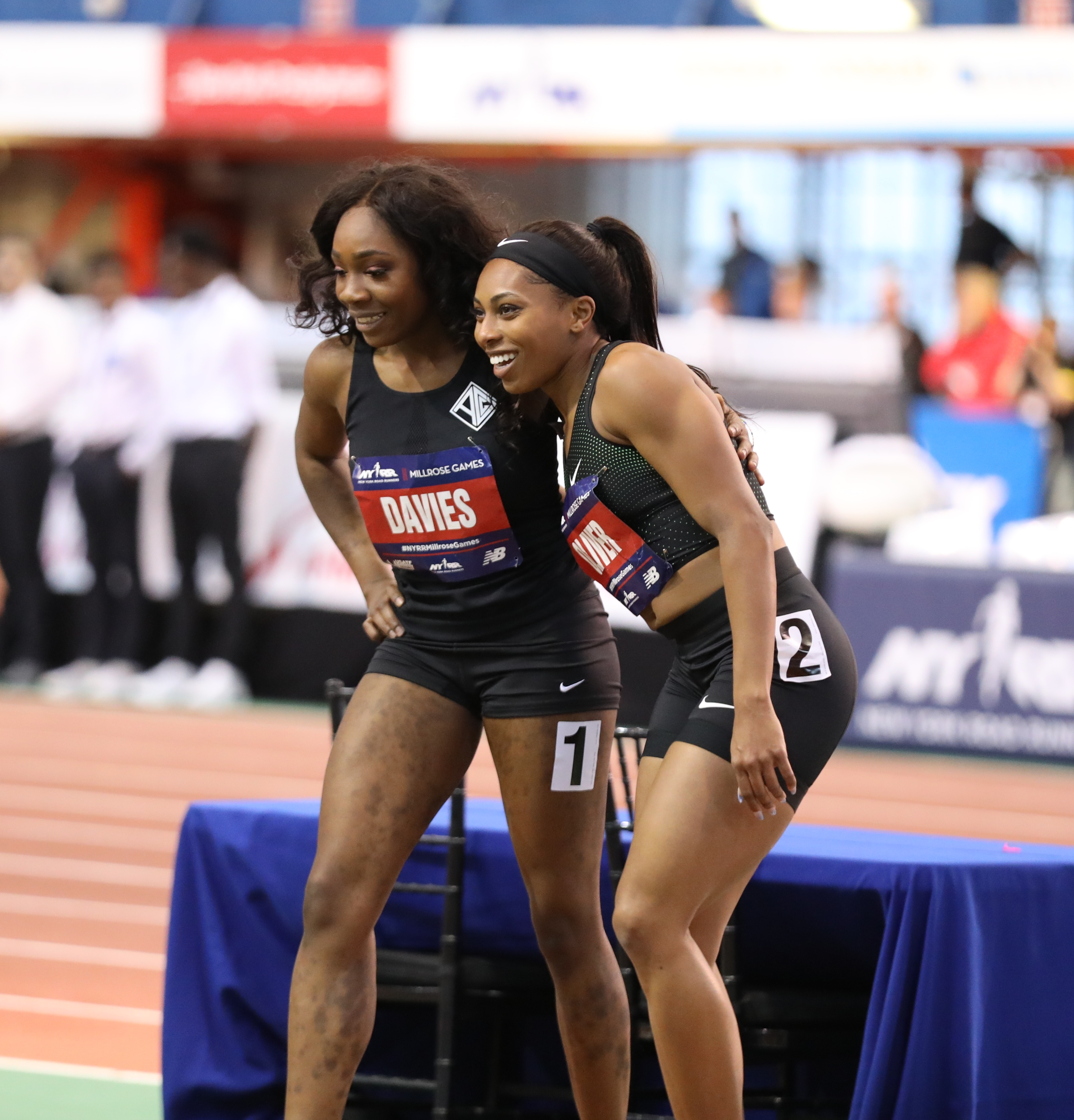
- Davies at the 2019 Millrose Games

Personal information
- Nationality: Liberian
- Born: 8 May 2000 (age 26) Ghana

Sport
- Sport: Athletics
- Event: Sprint

Achievements and titles
- Personal bests: 100m: 10.91 (Ostrava, 2025); 200m: 22.17 (Gainesville, 2024)
Medal record
Women's athletics
Representing Liberia
African Championships
Silver medal – second place	2026 Accra	4×100 m relay
Bronze medal – third place	2026 Accra	100 m
Bronze medal – third place	2024 Douala	4×100 m relay

Thelma Davies (born 8 May 2000) is a Liberian-American sprinter. She competed for Liberia at the 2024 Olympic Games and was the bronze medalist over 100 metres at the 2026 African Championships.

== Early life ==
Of Liberian descent, Davies was born in a refugee camp in Ghana to Emmanuel and Eliza Davies. Both her parents had fled the First Liberian Civil War and met and married in the camp. Later living in the United States, Davies attended Girard College in Philadelphia, Pennsylvania. She won four consecutive 100m and 200m doubles at the PIAA Championships between 2015 and 2019. She attended Louisiana State University from 2019, although the beginning of her track college career was interrupted by the COVID-19 pandemic.

== Career ==
Running for Louisiana State University, Davies ran personal best times in both the 100m and 200m at the 2024 SEC Championships in Gainesville, Florida, recording 11.01 seconds for the 100m and 22.17 seconds for the 200m.

She competed for Liberia at the 2024 African Championships in Athletics in Douala, Cameroon and was a member of the 4 × 100 m relay team that went on to win a bronze medal. She competed in the 100 metres at the 2024 Paris Olympics.

She competed at the 2025 World Athletics Relays in China in the Women's 4 × 100 metres relay in May 2025. In May 2025, she was named as a challenger for the short sprints category at the 2025 Grand Slam Track event in Philadelphia, finishing third in the 100 metres in 11.14 seconds. She won the 200 metres in Stockholm at the 2025 BAUHAUS-galan event in June 2025. She set a Liberian national record of 10.91 seconds to win the 100 metres at the Golden Spike Ostrava on 24 June.

In September 2025, she was a semi-finalist in the 100 metres at the 2025 World Championships in Tokyo, Japan. She also ran in the women's 200 metres at the championships, again reaching the semi-finals.

Davies won the bronze medal in the 100 metres at the 2026 African Championships in Athletics in Accra, Ghana, running 11.50 seconds. She also anchored the Liberia women's 4 × 100 m relay team to the silver medal at the championships.

== Statistics ==
=== Circuit performances ===
Grand Slam Track results
Slam	Race group	Event	Pl.	Time	Prize money
2025 Philadelphia Slam	Short sprints	200 m	8th	22.91	US$20,000
2025 Philadelphia Slam	Short sprints	100 m	3rd	11.14	US$20,000

Olympic Games
Preceded by Ebony Morrison; Joseph Fahnbulleh	Flag bearer for Liberia; Paris 2024 with Emmanuel Matadi	Succeeded by Incumbent
