= 2022 African Championships in Athletics – Men's decathlon =

The men's decathlon event at the 2022 African Championships in Athletics was held on 10 and 11 June in Port Louis, Mauritius.

== Medalists ==
Gold	Silver	Bronze
Larbi Bourrada; Algeria	Friedrich Pretorius; South Africa	Jesse Perez; South Africa

== Results ==
=== 100 metres ===
Wind: +3.7 m/s

Rank	Lane	Name	Nationality	Time	Points	Notes
1	5	Samuel Osadolor	Nigeria	10.57	959	
2	7	Jesse Perez	South Africa	10.77	912	
3	4	Edwin Too	Kenya	10.88	888	
4	6	Larbi Bourrada	Algeria	10.98	865	
5	8	Friedrich Pretorius	South Africa	11.08	843	
6	3	Marcell de Jager	South Africa	11.15	827	
7	2	Gilbert Koech	Kenya	11.38	778	

=== Long jump ===
Rank	Athlete	Nationality	#1	#2	#3	Result	Points	Notes	Total
1	Edwin Too	Kenya	7.14	7.44w	7.17	7.44w	920		1808
2	Larbi Bourrada	Algeria	4.32	7.03	7.38w	7.38w	905		1770
3	Jesse Perez	South Africa	x	7.36w	7.21	7.36w	900		1812
4	Friedrich Pretorius	South Africa	7.15w	7.30w	7.21	7.30w	886		1729
5	Marcell de Jager	South Africa	x	6.90	7.13	7.13	845		1672
6	Samuel Osadolor	Nigeria	6.62	x	x	6.62	725		1684
7	Gilbert Koech	Kenya	6.47w	6.49w	x	6.49w	695		1473

=== Shot put ===
Rank	Athlete	Nationality	#1	#2	#3	Result	Points	Notes	Total
1	Marcell de Jager	South Africa	13.96	14.21	14.62	14.62	766		2438
2	Friedrich Pretorius	South Africa	13.72	x	x	13.72	711		2440
3	Gilbert Koech	Kenya	12.50	12.60	13.31	13.31	686		2159
4	Larbi Bourrada	Algeria	12.33	13.14	12.81	13.14	676		2446
5	Jesse Perez	South Africa	12.54	12.39	12.65	12.65	646		2458
6	Samuel Osadolor	Nigeria	8.73	8.81	10.34	10.34	506		2190
7	Edwin Too	Kenya	8.50	8.45	8.62	8.62	403		2211

=== High jump ===
Rank	Athlete	Nationality	1.66	1.69	1.72	1.75	1.78	1.81	1.84	1.87	1.90	1.93	1.96	Result	Points	Notes	Total
1	Edwin Too	Kenya	–	–	–	–	–	o	o	o	o	o	xxx	1.93	740		2951
1	Larbi Bourrada	Algeria	–	–	–	–	–	o	o	–	o	o	xxx	1.93	740		3186
3	Friedrich Pretorius	South Africa	–	–	–	–	–	xo	–	o	xo	o	xxx	1.93	740		3180
4	Jesse Perez	South Africa	–	–	–	–	–	xo	xxo	o	xxx			1.87	687		3145
5	Marcell de Jager	South Africa	–	–	–	–	xo	xo	xo	xxx				1.84	661		3099
6	Samuel Osadolor	Nigeria	–	o	o	o	o	xxx						1.78	610		2800
7	Gilbert Koech	Kenya	o	o	o	o	xo	xxx						1.78	610		2769

=== 400 metres ===
Rank	Lane	Name	Nationality	Time	Points	Notes	Total
1	3	Larbi Bouraada	Algeria	49.61	833		4019
2	7	Jesse Perez	South Africa	50.00	815		3960
3	6	Edwin Too	Kenya	50.58	788		3739
4	4	Gilbert Koech	Kenya	51.05	767		3536
5	8	Friedrich Pretorius	South Africa	52.50	703		3883
6	5	Marcell de Jager	South Africa	54.30	627		3726
	4	Samuel Osadolor	Nigeria	DNS	0		DNF

=== 110 metres hurdles ===
Wind: +2.9 m/s

Rank	Lane	Name	Nationality	Time	Points	Notes	Total
1	3	Larbi Bouraada	Algeria	14.43	920		4939
2	2	Friedrich Pretorius	South Africa	14.71	885		4768
3	5	Edwin Too	Kenya	15.44	797		4536
4	6	Jesse Perez	South Africa	15.70	767		4727
5	1	Gilbert Koech	Kenya	15.79	757		4293
	4	Marcell de Jager	South Africa	DNS	0		DNF

=== Discus throw ===
Rank	Athlete	Nationality	#1	#2	#3	Result	Points	Notes	Total
1	Friedrich Pretorius	South Africa	x	40.93	x	40.93	683		5451
2	Larbi Bouraada	Algeria	36.51	40.22	39.31	40.22	669		5608
3	Gilbert Koech	Kenya	34.75	33.61	37.27	37.27	609		4902
4	Jesse Perez	South Africa	31.97	x	37.11	37.11	606		5333
5	Edwin Too	Kenya	34.72	x	x	34.72	558		5094

=== Pole vault ===
Rank	Athlete	Nationality	3.20	3.40	3.50	3.70	3.80	3.90	4.00	4.10	4.20	4.30	4.40	4.50	4.60	4.70	4.80	4.90	Result	Points	Notes	Total
1	Larbi Bouraada	Algeria	–	–	–	–	–	–	–	–	–	–	o	–	xo	xo	xo	xxx	4.80	849		6457
2	Friedrich Pretorius	South Africa	–	–	–	–	–	–	–	–	o	–	o	o	o	xxx			4.60	790		6241
3	Jesse Perez	South Africa	–	–	–	–	–	–	–	–	o	o	o	xxo	xxo	xxx			4.60	790		6123
4	Edwin Too	Kenya	–	–	o	o	o	o	xo	xxx									4.00	617		5711
5	Gilbert Koech	Kenya	o	o	xxx														3.40	457		5359

=== Javelin throw ===
Rank	Athlete	Nationality	#1	#2	#3	Result	Points	Notes	Total
1	Gilbert Koech	Kenya	53.69	52.79	59.24	59.24	726		6085
2	Friedrich Pretorius	South Africa	57.26	53.96	54.00	57.26	697		6938
3	Larbi Bouraada	Algeria	56.48	56.02	53.28	56.48	685		7142
4	Jesse Perez	South Africa	54.08	–	–	54.08	649		6772
5	Edwin Too	Kenya	49.69	50.71	50.19	50.71	599		6310

=== 1500 metres ===
Rank	Name	Nationality	Time	Points	Notes
1	Gilbert Koech	Kenya	4:31.20	737	
2	Edwin Too	Kenya	4:36.73	701	
3	Larbi Bouraada	Algeria	4:47.52	634	
4	Jesse Perez	South Africa	4:49.14	624	
5	Friedrich Pretorius	South Africa	4:58.92	566	

=== Final standings ===
The highest mark recorded in each event is highlighted in yellow

Rank	Athlete	Nationality	100m	LJ	SP	HJ	400m	110m H	DT	PV	JT	1500m	Points	Notes
1st place, gold medalist(s)	Larbi Bourrada	Algeria	10.98w	7.38w	13.14	1.93	49.61	14.43w	40.22	4.80	56.48	4:47.52	7776	
2nd place, silver medalist(s)	Friedrich Pretorius	South Africa	11.08w	7.30w	13.72	1.93	52.50	14.71w	40.93	4.60	57.26	4:58.92	7504	
3rd place, bronze medalist(s)	Jesse Perez	South Africa	10.77w	7.36w	12.65	1.87	50.00	15.70w	37.11	4.60	54.08	4:49.14	7396	
4	Edwin Too	Kenya	10.88w	7.44w	8.62	1.93	50.58	15.44w	34.72	4.00	50.71	4:36.73	7011	
5	Gilbert Koech	Kenya	11.38w	6.49w	13.31	1.78	51.05	15.79w	37.27	3.40	59.24	4:31.20	6822	
	Marcell de Jager	South Africa	11.15w	7.13	14.62	1.84	54.30	DNS	–	–	–	–	DNF	
	Samuel Osadolor	Nigeria	10.57w	6.62	10.34	1.78	DNS	–	–	–	–	–	DNF	
