= Maia McCoy =

American athlete (born 1996)

Maia Alyse McCoy
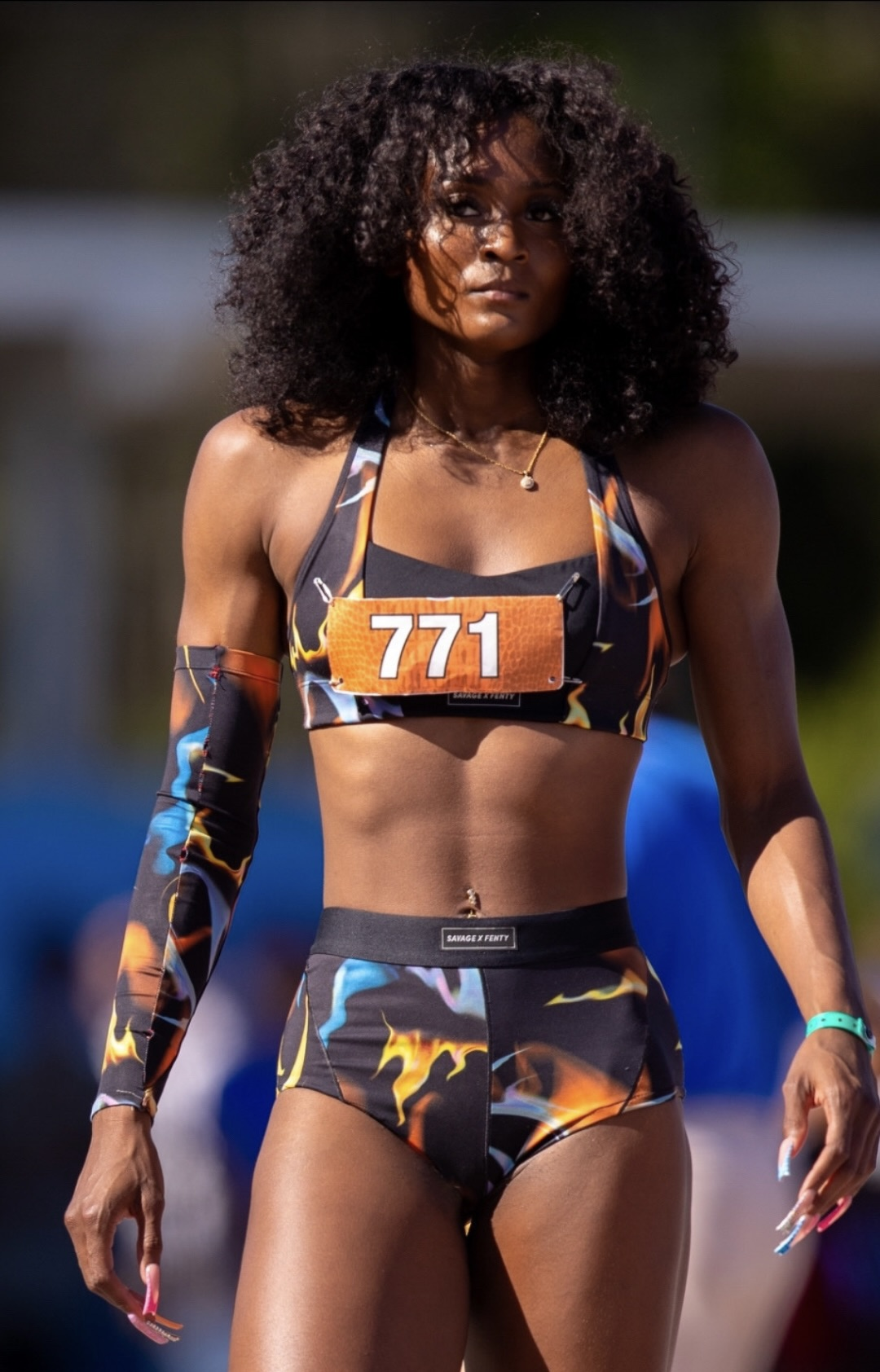
- McCoy at the Tom Jones Invitational 2024

Personal information
- Nationality: American
- Born: Maia Alyse McCoy; 9 December 1996 (age 29) Memphis, Tennessee, U.S.
- Height: 5 ft 9 in (175 cm)

Sport
- Country: United States
- Sport: Athletics
- Event: Sprint
- College team: Tennessee Volunteers (2015–2021)
- Coached by: Ken Harnden

Achievements and titles
- Highest world ranking: 12 (100-meter dash)
- Personal bests: 100m: 10.96 (Eisenstadt, 2025) 200m: 22.55 (Gainesville , 2025)
Medal record
Women's athletics
Representing Liberia
African Games
Silver medal – second place	2023 Accra	100 m
Silver medal – second place	2023 Accra	4×100m relay
African Championships
Silver medal – second place	2024 Douala	100 m
Bronze medal – third place	2024 Douala	4×100 m relay

Maia Alyse McCoy (born 9 December 1996) is an American sprinter.

== Early life ==
Maia Alyse McCoy was born and raised in Memphis, Tennessee. She grew up playing basketball but was convinced to run track in high school. She attended Whitehaven High School. McCoy attended the University of Tennessee where she earned her undergraduate degree in Communication Studies with a minor in Journalism. She continued her education at the same institution, completing a master's degree in Communication and Information with a concentration in Journalism.

In high school, McCoy was the Tennessee's State Champion in the 100-meter dash from 2013 to 2014 and 200 meters from 2013 to 2015. She won the Pepsi Best of the Preps title, presented by the Commercial Appeal at the Germantown Performing Arts Center, in 2013, 2014, and 2015. McCoy became the first person, male or female, to win the prestigious award three consecutive years. She was also chosen as the girls' Athlete of the Year for public schools.

During her time at the University of Tennessee, McCoy had an impressive track and field career. She finished her five-year Lady Vol career ranking third in program history in the 100-meter dash with a time of 11.12 seconds and ninth in the 200-meter dash with a time of 23.00 seconds. She reached the semi-finals of the 100-meter dash at the 2020 U.S. Olympic Team Trials, placing 15th overall with a time of 11.16 seconds. In addition, McCoy was decorated in bronze medals at the SEC Championships through 2019–2021, earning third-place finishes in both the 60m, 100 and 200m dashes.

== Career ==
She ran a personal best time for the 100 metres of 11.08 seconds in Gainesville, Florida in April 2023. She ran 11.08 seconds again to win the 100 metres at the Arkansas Grand Prix in Fayetteville, Arkansas in June 2023.

=== 2024 ===
In 2024, McCoy accepted an opportunity to represent Liberia in international competitions, qualifying through the country’s recruitment initiative aimed at strengthening its national team. Though she had no familial or residential ties to Liberia, the opportunity allowed her to compete in higher-level international meets. She went on to win silver medals in both the 100 meters and the 4 × 100-meter relay at the 2024 All-Africa Games, and another silver in the 100 meters at the 2024 African Championships in Douala, Cameroon. Later that year, following concerns about the legitimacy of the recruitment practices and organizational issues within the Liberian athletics federation, McCoy initiated a transfer of allegiance back to the United States. She has stated that she has no personal, familial, or cultural ties to Liberia, and that her decision to represent the country briefly was a strategic misstep. She is now proud to represent the United States — the country of her birth, upbringing, and heritage.

=== 2025 ===
She finished sixth in 11.10 seconds in the 100 metres in May 2025 at the 2025 Doha Diamond League. The following week she ran 11.08 seconds (0.2m/s) to finish runner-up to Shericka Jackson in the 100 metres at the 2025 Meeting International Mohammed VI d'Athlétisme de Rabat, also part of the 2025 Diamond League. She ran 11.21 seconds to win the 100 metres at the Kip Keino Classic in Nairobi on 31 May 2025. She finished fifth in the 200 metres at the Diamond League event at the 2025 Golden Gala in Rome on 6 June 2025. The following week finished fifth in the 100 metres at the 2025 Bislett Games in Oslo on 12 June and fourth in the 100 metres in Stockholm at the 2025 BAUHAUS-galan event on 15 June. She had a seventh place finish in the 100 metres at the Diamond League Final in Zurich on 28 August.

== Personal life ==
Maia Alyse McCoy was raised by her parents Joe and Marla McCoy in Memphis, TN. She is known for her creativity in creating fashionable track competition outfits using pieces from Rihanna's athletic and lounge wear brand, Savage X Fenty. She collaborated with a Memphis seamstress, Timone Robinson. McCoy's innovative designs caught the attention of Savage X Fenty, who admired her creativity and appointed her as a brand ambassador.

== Athletics achievements ==
Information from her World Athletics profile unless otherwise noted.

=== Personal bests ===
Type	Distance	Time (s)	Wind (m/s)	Venue	Date	Notes
Individual events
Indoor	60 metres	7.16	—N/a	Berlin, Germany	6 March 2026	
Indoor	200 metres sh	23.03	—N/a	Fayetteville, United States	22 February 2019	
Outdoor	100 metres	10.96	+1.7	Eisenstadt, Austria	23 July 2025	
Outdoor	200 metres	22.55	-0.1	Gainesville, United States	18 April 2025	
Team events
Outdoor	4 × 100 metres relay	42.93	—N/a	Douala, Cameroon	23 June 2024	NR

=== International competitions ===
Representing Liberia
Year	Competition	Venue	Position	Event	Time	Notes
2024	African Games	Accra, Ghana	2nd	100 m	11.49	
2024	African Games	Accra, Ghana	2nd	4 × 100 m relay	44.02	
2024	World Relays	Nassau, Bahamas	13th (h)	4 × 100 m relay	43.15	
2024	African Championships	Douala, Cameroon	2nd	100 m	11.16	
2024	African Championships	Douala, Cameroon	3rd	4 × 100 m relay	44.38	
