= Halutie Hor =

Ghanaian sprinter (born 1999)

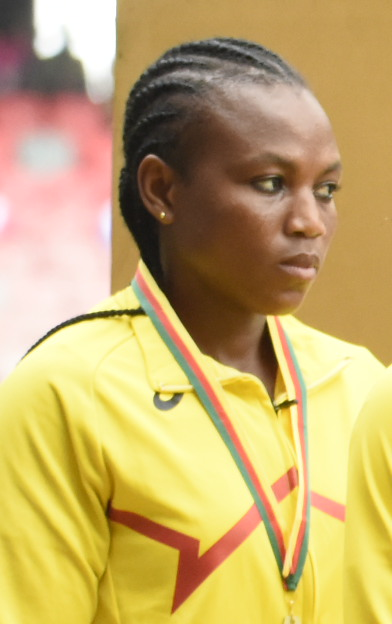

Personal information
- Nationality: Ghanaian
- Born: 4 April 1999 (age 27) Accra, Ghana
- Height: 1.70 m (5 ft 7 in)
- Weight: 72 kg (159 lb)

Sport
- Sport: Track and field
- Event: 100 metres
Medal record
Women's athletics
Representing Ghana
African Games
Bronze medal – third place	2023 Accra	4 × 100 m relay
African Championships
Silver medal – second place	2024 Douala	4×100 m relay

Halutie Hor (born 4 April 1999) is a Ghanaian sprinter from Nmanduonu in the Upper West Region.

== Education ==
Halutie Hor is a formal Student of Ahamdiyya Islamic Senior School in Kumasi popular known as T. I. AMASS. She completed in the year 2017.

== International Games ==
She competed at the 2018 Commonwealth Games in both the 100 metres and the 4x100 metres relay. In the 100 metres Hor qualified for the final where she finished eighth in a time of 11.54 seconds, 0.44 seconds behind gold medalist Michelle-Lee Ahye from Trinidad and Tobago.

In the 4x100 metres relay she was part of a Ghanaian team that qualified for the final where they finished fifth in a time of 43.64 seconds.

== Awards ==
Halutie is an African Championships silver medalist, as well as an All-African Games bronze medalist.
