= Pierrick-Linda Moulin =

Gabonese sprinter (born 2001)

Personal information
- Born: 12 June 2001 (age 25) Libreville, Gabon

Sport
- Sport: Athletics
- Event: Sprint

Achievements and titles
- Personal bests: 100m: 11.35 (2024); 200m: 23.76 (2023); Indoors; 60m: 7.31 (2025); 200m: 23.97 (2025) NR; 60mH: 9.21 (2022) NR

Pierrick-Linda Moulin (born 12 June 2001) is a Gabonese sprinter. She is the national record holder over 200 metres indoors. She competed in the women's 100 metres at the 2025 World Athletics Championships.

== Biography ==
She is from Libreville in Gabon, but became based in France from the age of six years-old. She lived in Romans-sur-Isère and competed as a member of Entente Athlétique Romanaise Péagoise (EARP) and Entente Athlétique Rhône Vercors (EARC), and also trained in rugby union with FGC Amazones in Grenoble. She placed third in the 100 metres at the French junior championships in Albi in September 2020.

In February 2023, at the age of 22 years-old, she ran a personal best time and Gabonese national indoor record of 24.12 seconds to finish runner-up in the 200 metres at the French Junior Indoor Championships in Miramas. In June 2023, competing for Annecy Athletics, she set a personal best in the 100 meters of 11.64 seconds. She then improved her personal best in the 200m later that day, with 23.92 seconds.

She was a semi-finalist in the 100 metres and 200 metres at the delayed 2023 African Games held in Accra, Ghana, in March 2024. She was also a semi-finalist in the 100 metres and 200 metres at the 2024 African Championships in Athletics in Douala, Cameroon, in June 2024.

She was selected to compete in the women's 100 metres at the 2025 World Athletics Championships in Tokyo, Japan, in September 2025, running 11.58 seconds without advancing to the semi-finals.

In July 2026, she was a semi-finalist competing in the 100 metres at the 2026 Commonwealth Games in Glasgow, Scotland.
