= Eunice Kadogo =

Kenyan sprinter (born 1996)

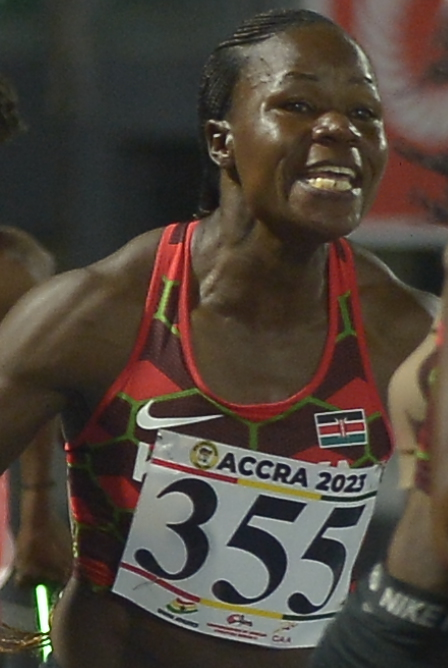
- on 2023

Personal information
- Nationality: Kenyan
- Born: 4 May 1994 (age 32)

Sport
- Sport: Sprinting
- Event: 1-200 metres
Medal record
Women's athletics
Representing Kenya
African Championships
Bronze medal – third place	2018 Asaba	4×100 m

Eunice Kadogo (born 4 May 1994) is a Kenyan athlete who specializes in sprinting. In 2015, she won the silver medal in the 100 meters at the African Games in Brazzaville. She has been the national champion at 100 and 200 metres.

== International career ==
Kadogo gained her first international experience at the 2015 African Games in Brazzaville, where she won the silver medal in the 100-meter sprint in 11.47 seconds, behind Ivory Coast's Marie-Josée Ta Lou. Kadogo set a national record with Pon Karidjatou Traore in third place. She was seventh in the 200 meters with a time of 23.83 seconds and fourth as part of the Kenyan 4 x 100-meter relay team whose time was 44.75 seconds.

At the 2016 African Championships in Durban, she was eliminated in the first round of the 100-meter event with a time of 12.18 seconds. She did reached the semi-finals of the 200-meter event, but she was eliminated with a time of 24.04 seconds. She was again part of the 100m relay team whose time of 46.00 seconds made them fourth.

On 2018, she was eliminated from the 200-meter race at the African Championships in Asaba in 24.54 seconds, but she won a bronze medal with the relay whose time was 45.58 seconds behind Nigeria and the Ivory Coast. She and other members of relay squad were serving as police officers when they were not competing.

At the 2019 IAAF World Relays in Yokohama, she competed in the 4 x 200-meter relay but she was unable to finish. In August, she competed again at the African Games in Rabat, but was eliminated in the first round with a time of 12.68 seconds. She was one of three Kenyan women, together with Maximilla Imali and Monica Safania, who competed at the 2022 African Championships in Port Louis, where she was eliminated with a time of 11.99 seconds in the semifinals. She failed to advance past the preliminary round of the 200-meter race with a time of 24.68 seconds. She again finished fourth with the relay team.

In 2024 she came second to Esther Mbagari with a time of 11.8 seconds to qualify for the African Games in Accra. She was eliminated from with a time of 12.11 seconds in the 100-meter preliminary heats and failed to finish in the final with the relay team. In June, she was eliminated from the African Championships in Douala with a time of 12.48 seconds in the first round of the 100-meter race and finished seventh with the relay team with a time of 46.63 seconds.

== Nationally ==
In 2016 and 2018, Kadogo became Kenyan champion in the 200-meter race and in 2016 she was also champion in the 100-meter race.

She was the 200m national champion in 2018.
