= Esther Mbagari =

Kenyan sprinter (born 2000)

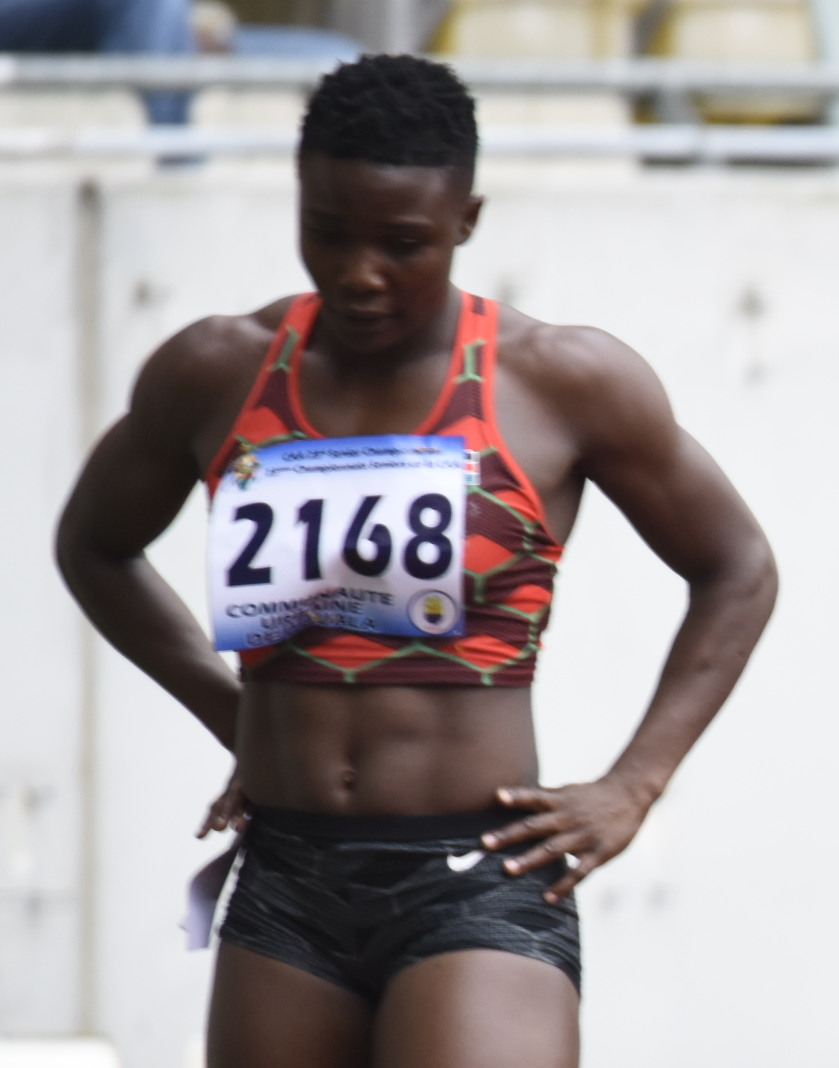

Personal information
- Nationality: Kenyan
- Born: 20 December 2000 (age 24)

Sport
- Sport: Sprinting
- Event: 1-200 metres

Esther Mbagari (born 2000) is a Kenyan athlete who specializes in sprinting. She was the National 100m champion in 2023 and 2024.

== Life ==
Mbagari was born in 2000. In 2023 she was employed by Kenya Prisons and she was competing.

== International career ==
Mbagari gained her first international experience in 2024, when she was eliminated in the semifinals of the 200-meter race at the African Games in Accra with a time of 24.25 seconds and failed to advance past the preliminary round in the 100-meter race with a time of 12.00 seconds. She also failed to reach the final with the Kenyan 4 x 100-meter relay team. In June, she was eliminated in the first round of the 100-meter race at the African Championships at the Stade Omnisport de Japoma in Douala with a time of 11.77 seconds and in the semifinals of the 200-meter race with a time of 23.77 seconds. She also finished seventh in the 4 x 100 meter relay in 46.63 seconds and won the bronze medal in the 4 x 400 meter relay in 3:32.65 minutes together with Joan Cherono, Veronica Mutua and Mercy Chebet behind the teams from Nigeria and Zambia.

In 2024 she beat all at 100 and 200m including Eunice Kadogo to qualify for the African Games in Accra.

== Nationally ==
She was the national 100m champion and in 2024 she competed at the national championships and won again with a time of 11.77 seconds.
