= Mary Boakye =

Ghanaian track and field athlete

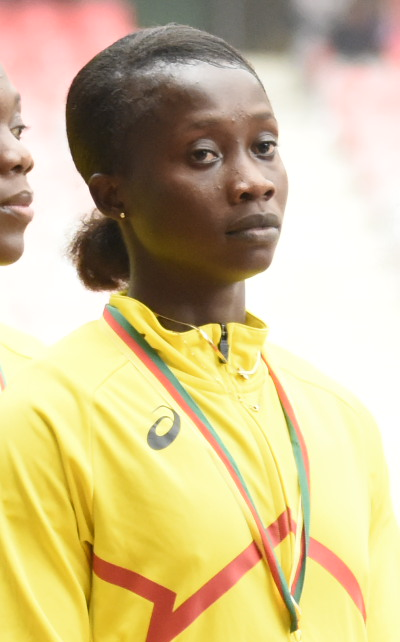
Mary Boakye

Mary Boakye (born August 13, 2000) is a Ghanaian track and field athlete who specializes in sprinting.

== Athletic career ==
Mary Boakye gained her first international experience in 2022 when she took sixth place in the Ghanaian 4 x 100 meter relay in 44.86s at the Commonwealth Games in Birmingham. The following year, she was eliminated from the 100 meter semi-final at the World University Games in Chengdu with a time of 11.68s and did not take part in the 200 meter semi-final. In 2024, she took seventh place in the 100 meters at the African Games in Accra in 11.71s and won the bronze medal in the relay in 44.21s, together with Janet Mensah, Doris Mensah and Halutie Hor behind the teams from [[Nigeria]] and [[Liberia]].

== Personal bests ==
- 100 meters: 11.50 s (−0.1 m/s), March 18, 2024 in Accra
- 200 meters: 23.86 s (−0.9 m/s), May 21, 2022 in Cape Coast
- 4×100 Metres Relay 44.21 s, March 20, 2022 in Accra
