= Jade Nangula =

Namibian sprinter (born 1997)

Personal information
- Nationality: Namibian
- Born: 26 November 1997 (age 28) Otavi

Sport
- Club: UNAM Club
- Coached by: Erwin Naimhwaka

Jade Nangula (born 26 November 1997 in Otavi) is a Namibian sprinter. She participated in South African Grand Prix Competition on the 19 March 2025 with a record time of 11.81 seconds in 100m women heat. She is coached by Erwin Naimhwaka. She has also participated in other international competitions such as All African Games in Ghana, the African Championships in Cameroon, the Botswana Grand Prix, the Mozambique Nationals, the Botswana Nationals among others.
