= Destiny Smith-Barnett =

American sprinter (born 1996)

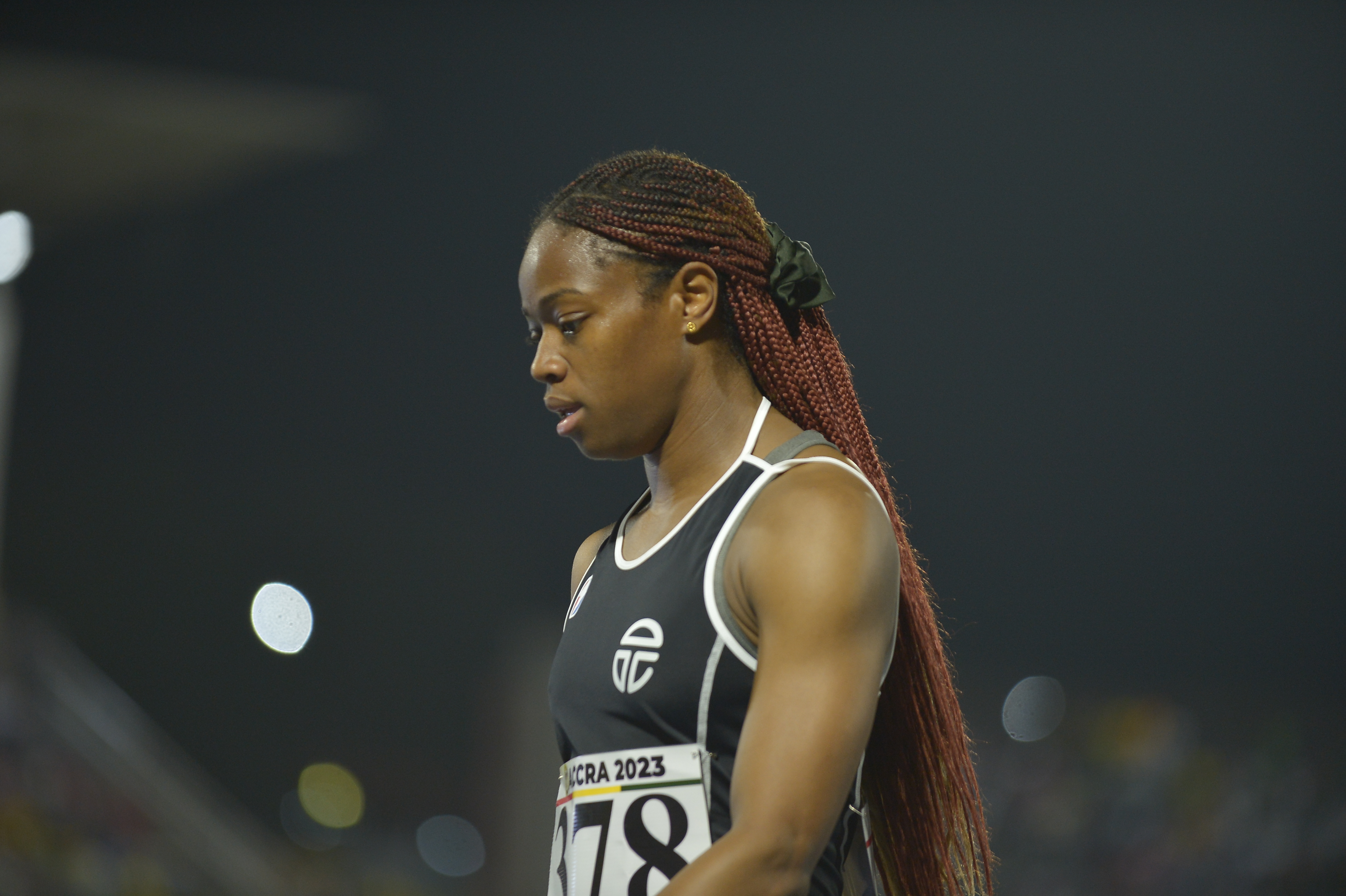

Personal information
- Born: 26 July 1996 (age 30) Oakland, California, USA
- Education: Skyline High School (2014); University of Nevada, Las Vegas (2019)

Sport
- Sport: Athletics
- Events: 60 metres 100 metres
- College team: UNLV Rebels
- Club: Double Pillar Athletics

Achievements and titles
- National finals: 2019 NCAA Indoors; • 60m, 4th; 2020 USA Indoors; • 60m, 5th; 2022 USA Indoors; • 60m, 4th; 2023 USA Indoors; • 60m, 3rd (bronze)
- Personal bests: 60m: 7.11 (2022, 2023); 100m: 11.06 (+2.0) (2022)
Medal record
Women's athletics
Representing Liberia
African Games
Silver medal – second place	2023 Accra	4 × 100 m relay
African Championships
Silver medal – second place	2026 Accra	4 x 100m relay
Bronze medal – third place	2024 Douala	4×100 m relay
- Updated on 1 January 2024

Destiny Smith-Barnett (born 26 July 1996) is a Liberian-American sprinter specializing in the 60 metres and 100 metres. She was the bronze medalist at the 2023 USA Indoor Track and Field Championships in the 60m.

== Early life and education ==
Smith-Barnett was born June 26, 1996, in Oakland, California to Adrienne Smith and Davin Barnett Sr. and has three siblings: Davin Jr., Daysha and Derion. She attended Skyline High School, where she competed in the 100 and 200 meter dashes. In 2014, she finished second at the CIF California State Meet in the 100 m. While in high school, she was named to the Oakland Athletic League First Team and was selected as the league's most valuable player. She also broke the school's 100m record.

Smith-Barnett then attended the University of Nevada, Las Vegas, where she studied kinesiology.

== Collegiate career ==
From 2015 to 2019, Smith-Barnett attended the University of Nevada, Las Vegas and competed as a member of the UNLV Rebels track and field team. As a sophomore, she suffered from a back injury, causing her to miss the outdoor season. She made one NCAA national final, finishing fourth in the 60m at the 2019 NCAA Division I Indoor Track and Field Championships.

== Professional career ==
At the 2020 USA Indoor Track and Field Championships, Smith-Barnett finished 5th in the 60m, with a time of 7.21 seconds. She did not compete in the 2020 outdoor season.

The following year, Smith-Barnett competed in the 100m at the United States Olympic trials. In her preliminary heat, she was disqualified for a false start and was not selected for the U.S. Olympic team.

At the 2022 USA Indoor Track and Field Championships, Smith-Barntt finished fourth in the 60m with a new personal best of 7.11 seconds.

At the USA Indoor Track and Field Championships the following year, Smith-Barnett equalled her best time, this time placing third and earning her first senior national medal.

In March 2024 at the African Games, Smith-Barnett won a silver medal in the 4 × 100 m relay representing Liberia, she set a new personal best over 100m on the 9 June 2024, running 10.99 at the Last Chance Sprint Series.

== Statistics ==
=== Personal bests ===
Event	Mark	Place	Competition	Venue	Date	Ref
60 metres	7.11	3rd place, bronze medalist(s)	USA Indoor Track and Field Championships	Spokane, Washington	27 February 2022	
100 metres	10.99 (+0.6 m/s)	1st	Last Chance Sprint Series	Sherman Oaks, California	8 June 2024	
