= Athletics at the 2023 Jeux de la Francophonie – Results =

These are the official results of the athletics competition at the 2023 Jeux de la Francophonie which took place at the Stade des Martyrs between 31 July and 4 August 2023 2023 in Kinshasa, Democratic Republic of the Congo.

== Men's results ==
=== 100 metres ===
Heats – 31 July
Wind:
Heat 1: -0.2 m/s, Heat 2: -0.4 m/s, Heat 3: -0.7 m/s, Heat 4: -0.5 m/s, Heat 5: +1.9 m/s

Rank	Heat	Name	Nationality	Time	Notes
1	4	Arthur Cissé	Ivory Coast	10.24	Q
2	5	Chakir Machmour	Morocco	10.32	Q
3	5	Noah Bibi	Mauritius	10.36	Q
4	5	Claude Itoungue Bongogne	Cameroon	10.41	q
5	3	Raphael Ngaguele Mberlina	Cameroon	10.41	Q
6	5	Olivier Mwimba	Democratic Republic of the Congo	10.46	q
7	1	Kossi Médard Nayo	Togo	10.48	Q, PB
8	3	Mamadou Fall Sarr	Senegal	10.51	Q
9	2	Emmanuel Eseme	Cameroon	10.52	Q
10	1	Lionel Tshimanga Muteba	Democratic Republic of the Congo	10.54	Q
11	1	Jonathan Bardottier	Mauritius	10.55	q
12	5	Omar Ndoye	Senegal	10.59	q
13	4	Noureddine Hadid	Lebanon	10.62	Q
14	5	Sharry Dodin	Seychelles	10.63	
15	4	Ibrahima Hamayadji	Cameroon	10.63	
16	3	Dominique Lasconi Mulamba	Democratic Republic of the Congo	10.64	q
17	2	Ibrahim Diomandé	Ivory Coast	10.68	Q
18	4	Romeo Manzila Mahambou	Republic of the Congo	10.72	
19	3	Abdoul Razack Koné	Ivory Coast	10.73	
20	2	Jesus Orphée Topize	Mauritius	10.73	q
21	2	Abderamane Simpore	Burkina Faso	10.81	
22	4	Didier Kiki	Benin	10.87	
23	3	Jérôme Kounou	Benin	10.93	
24	1	Leeroy Henriette	Seychelles	11.00	
25	2	Dyland Sicobo	Seychelles	11.12	
26	2	Remigio Santander Villarubia	Equatorial Guinea	11.46	PB
27	1	Andres Silvano Eyi Ndong	Equatorial Guinea	11.52	PB
28	3	Gregorio Ndong Oye	Equatorial Guinea	12.26	
	1	Issa Sangare	Mali	DNF	
	1	Micaiah Harris	Cameroon	DNS	
	2	Benjamin Ombenga	Central African Republic	DNS	
	3	Tarek Oko Mbea Ngala	Republic of the Congo	DNS	
	4	Marvelus Junior Conge	Central African Republic	DNS	
	4	José Luis Borico Chene	Equatorial Guinea	DNS	
	5	Wissy Hoye Yenda	Gabon	DNS	

Semifinals – 31 July
Wind:
Heat 1: -0.4 m/s, Heat 2: +0.1 m/s

Rank	Heat	Name	Nationality	Time	Notes
1	2	Emmanuel Eseme	Cameroon	10.03	Q, GR
2	2	Arthur Cissé	Ivory Coast	10.14	Q
3	1	Mamadou Fall Sarr	Senegal	10.30	Q
4	1	Raphael Ngaguele Mberlina	Cameroon	10.32	Q
5	1	Chakir Machmour	Morocco	10.35	Q
6	1	Noah Bibi	Mauritius	10.40	q
7	1	Claude Itoungue Bongogne	Cameroon	10.48	q
8	2	Lionel Tshimanga Muteba	Democratic Republic of the Congo	10.51	Q
9	2	Noureddine Hadid	Lebanon	10.51	
10	2	Olivier Mwimba	Democratic Republic of the Congo	10.57	
11	2	Jonathan Bardottier	Mauritius	10.58	
12	1	Orphée Topize	Mauritius	10.61	
13	1	Dominique Lasconi Mulamba	Democratic Republic of the Congo	10.65	
	2	Kossi Médard Nayo	Togo	DQ	R16.8
	1	Ibrahim Diomandé	Ivory Coast	DNS	
	2	Omar Ndoye	Senegal	DNS	

Final – 1 August

Wind: +0.9 m/s

Rank	Lane	Name	Nationality	Time	Notes
1st place, gold medalist(s)	5	Emmanuel Eseme	Cameroon	10.04	
2nd place, silver medalist(s)	3	Mamadou Fall Sarr	Senegal	10.17	=NR
3rd place, bronze medalist(s)	6	Arthur Cissé	Ivory Coast	10.24	
4	1	Noah Bibi	Mauritius	10.33	SB
5	2	Chakir Machmour	Morocco	10.41	
6	4	Raphael Ngaguele Mberlina	Cameroon	10.44	
7	7	Lionel Tshimanga Muteba	Democratic Republic of the Congo	10.49	
8	8	Claude Itoungue Bongogne	Cameroon	10.57	

=== 200 metres ===
Heats – 3 August
Wind:
Heat 1: 0.0 m/s, Heat 2: +1.2 m/s, Heat 3: +0.5 m/s, Heat 4: +0.5 m/s, Heat 5: +1.4 m/s

Rank	Heat	Name	Nationality	Time	Notes
1	5	Guy Maganga Gorra	Gabon	20.86	Q
2	5	Noah Bibi	Mauritius	20.95	Q
3	2	Mamadou Fall Sarr	Senegal	20.96	Q, PB
4	4	Kossi Médard Nayo	Togo	20.98	Q, PB
5	1	Chakir Machmour	Morocco	21.01	Q
6	3	Fode Sissoko	Mali	21.04	Q
7	3	Cheickna Traoré	Ivory Coast	21.12	Q
8	1	Noureddine Hadid	Lebanon	21.13	Q
9	2	Dominique Lasconi Mulamba	Democratic Republic of the Congo	21.15	Q
10	4	Claude Itoungue Bongogne	Cameroon	21.23	Q
11	2	Jonathan Bardottier	Mauritius	21.26	Q
12	1	Ibrahima Hamayadji	Cameroon	21.31	Q
13	5	Gnamien Nehemie N'Goran	Ivory Coast	21.33	Q
14	3	Lionel Tshimanga Muteba	Democratic Republic of the Congo	21.39	Q
15	1	Oumar Ndoye	Senegal	21.42	q, PB
16	2	Sharry Dodin	Seychelles	21.48	
17	1	Jérôme Kounou	Benin	21.53	PB
18	3	Tarek Oko Mbea Ngala Nene	Republic of the Congo	21.54	
19	1	Joshan Vencatasamy	Mauritius	21.57	
20	4	Amara Conte	Guinea	22.05	Q
21	3	Leeroy Henriette	Seychelles	22.06	
22	4	Didier Kiki	Benin	22.24	
23	4	Rossene Mpingo Kasongo	Democratic Republic of the Congo	22.41	
24	5	Davit Sargsyan	Armenia	22.86	PB
	2	Wissy Hoye Yenda	Gabon	DNS	
	2	Gilles Anthony Afoumba	Republic of the Congo	DNS	
	4	Benjamin Ombenga	Central African Republic	DNS	
	4	Abdoul Razack Koné	Ivory Coast	DNS	
	5	Issa Sangare	Mali	DNS	
	5	Marvelus Junior Conge	Central African Republic	DNS	

Semifinals – 3 August
Wind:
Heat 1: +0.8 m/s, Heat 2: -0.5 m/s

Rank	Heat	Name	Nationality	Time	Notes
1	1	Guy Maganga Gorra	Gabon	20.62	Q
2	2	Cheickna Traoré	Ivory Coast	20.63	Q
3	1	Fode Sissoko	Mali	20.67	Q
4	1	Chakir Machmour	Morocco	20.67	Q, PB
5	1	Noureddine Hadid	Lebanon	20.82	q
6	2	Noah Bibi	Mauritius	20.97	Q
7	2	Kossi Médard Nayo	Togo	20.99	Q
8	2	Claude Itoungue Bongogne	Cameroon	21.05	q
9	1	Gnamien Nehemie N'Goran	Ivory Coast	21.12	PB
10	1	Dominique Lasconi Mulamba	Democratic Republic of the Congo	21.16	
11	1	Jonathan Bardottier	Mauritius	21.18	
12	1	Oumar Ndoye	Senegal	21.27	PB
13	2	Lionel Tshimanga Muteba	Democratic Republic of the Congo	21.44	
14	2	Ibrahima Hamayadji	Cameroon	21.46	
15	2	Mamadou Fall Sarr	Senegal	21.50	
	2	Amara Conte	Guinea	DNS	

Final – 4 August

Wind: -0.3 m/s

Rank	Lane	Name	Nationality	Time	Notes
1st place, gold medalist(s)	5	Cheickna Traoré	Ivory Coast	20.37	
2nd place, silver medalist(s)	7	Fode Sissoko	Mali	20.62	
3rd place, bronze medalist(s)	6	Guy Maganga Gorra	Gabon	20.64	
4	3	Chakir Machmour	Morocco	20.65	PB
5	8	Noah Bibi	Mauritius	20.73	
6	1	Claude Itoungue Bongogne	Cameroon	20.88	
7	4	Kossi Médard Nayo	Togo	20.92	PB
8	2	Noureddine Hadid	Lebanon	20.95	

=== 400 metres ===
Heats – 31 July

Rank	Heat	Name	Nationality	Time	Notes
1	3	Gilles Anthony Afoumba	Republic of the Congo	46.37	Q
2	3	Rachid Mhamdi	Morocco	46.55	Q
3	3	Frédéric Mendy	Senegal	46.59	q
4	1	Cheikh Tidiane Diouf	Senegal	46.80	Q
5	2	Hamza Dair	Morocco	46.89	Q
6	2	Charles Devantay	Switzerland	47.27	Q
7	1	Aymane El Haddaoui	Morocco	47.66	Q
8	2	Lamine Diallo	Senegal	47.96	q
9	2	Todiasoa Rabearison	Madagascar	48.26	
10	2	Mohamad Mortada	Lebanon	48.40	
11	1	Amara Conte	Guinea	48.43	
12	1	Robert Parge	Romania	48.55	
13	1	Sultan Abdallah	United Arab Emirates	49.11	
14	3	Edmond Hounthon	Benin	49.20	
15	1	Celeb Vadivello	Seychelles	50.16	
16	3	Vicky Busa Ekoki	Democratic Republic of the Congo	50.22	
17	2	Yannick Kinkela Pepito	Democratic Republic of the Congo	50.23	
18	1	Nathan Kilongo Sanga	Democratic Republic of the Congo	50.59	
19	3	Davit Sargsyan	Armenia	50.73	
	1	Roman Aleksanyan	Armenia	DQ	R16.8
	3	Aboubakar Tetndap Nsangou	Cameroon	DNF	
	2	Corneille Ayingouka	Central African Republic	DNS	

Final – 1 August

Rank	Lane	Name	Nationality	Time	Notes
1st place, gold medalist(s)	4	Cheikh Tidiane Diouf	Senegal	45.78	
2nd place, silver medalist(s)	6	Hamza Dair	Morocco	46.07	
3rd place, bronze medalist(s)	7	Rachid Mhamdi	Morocco	46.26	PB
4	2	Frédéric Mendy	Senegal	46.50	
5	8	Aymane El Haddaoui	Morocco	46.91	
6	3	Charles Devantay	Switzerland	47.06	
7	1	Lamine Diallo	Senegal	48.75	
	5	Gilles Anthony Afoumba	Republic of the Congo	DNS	

=== 800 metres ===
Heats – 1 August

Rank	Heat	Name	Nationality	Time	Notes
1	2	Mostafa Smaili	Morocco	1:49.16	Q
2	2	Nabil Oussama	Morocco	1:49.50	Q
3	2	Aden Moussa Absieh	Djibouti	1:50.29	Q
1	1	Oussama El Bouchayby	Morocco	1:50.37	Q
2	1	Riad El Chenini	Tunisia	1:50.56	Q
3	1	Abdo-Razak Hassan	Djibouti	1:50.98	Q
4	2	Makman Yoagbati	Togo	1:51.12	q
4	1	Patrice Remandro	Madagascar	1:51.33	q
5	1	Ahmed Daher Ismail	Djibouti	1:51.34	
5	2	Rodrigue Biziyaremye	Burundi	1:52.21	
6	2	Roman Aleksanyan	Armenia	1:54.53	
6	1	Ali Mourtada	Lebanon	1:56.35	
7	1	Josue Kyungu Kakundi	Democratic Republic of the Congo	1:56.62	
7	2	Nathan Kilongo Sanga	Democratic Republic of the Congo	1:56.99	
	1	Christian Ucircan Kutuba	Democratic Republic of the Congo	DNS	
	2	Patrick Kpangba Mandata	Central African Republic	DNS	

Final – 2 August

Rank	Name	Nationality	Time	Notes
1st place, gold medalist(s)	Oussama El Bouchayby	Morocco	1:47.74	
2nd place, silver medalist(s)	Mostafa Smaili	Morocco	1:47.76	
3rd place, bronze medalist(s)	Nabil Oussama	Morocco	1:48.18	
4	Abdo-Razak Hassan	Djibouti	1:48.74	
5	Riad El Chenini	Tunisia	1:48.77	
6	Makman Yoagbati	Togo	1:50.09	NR
7	Patrice Remandro	Madagascar	1:50.50	PB
8	Aden Moussa Absieh	Djibouti	1:54.39	

=== 1500 metres ===
3 August

Rank	Name	Nationality	Time	Notes
1st place, gold medalist(s)	Hicham Akankam	Morocco	3:41.08	
2nd place, silver medalist(s)	Hafid Rizky	Morocco	3:41.89	
3rd place, bronze medalist(s)	Abdo-Razak Hassan	Djibouti	3:42.08	PB
4	Fouad Messaoudi	Morocco	3:42.09	
5	Thierry Irakoze	Burundi	3:45.48	
6	Elie Sindayikengera	Burundi	3:45.65	
7	Ahmed Daher Ismail	Djibouti	3:45.75	
8	Aden Moussa Absieh	Djibouti	3:49.55	
9	Nicolae Marian Coman	Romania	3:51.84	
10	Roman Aleksanyan	Armenia	3:59.28	
11	Alpha Mumbere Kamuha	Democratic Republic of the Congo	4:07.25	
12	Gautier Kakund Musans	Democratic Republic of the Congo	4:10.62	
	Chadrack Mputu Muzenge	Democratic Republic of the Congo	DNS	
	Makman Yoagbati	Togo	DNS	

=== 5000 metres ===
4 August

Rank	Name	Nationality	Time	Notes
1st place, gold medalist(s)	Mohamed Ismail Ibrahim	Djibouti	13:22.44	
2nd place, silver medalist(s)	Hicham Akankam	Morocco	13:29.86	
3rd place, bronze medalist(s)	Emilie Hafashimana	Burundi	13:31.11	
4	Houssein Sougueh Aden	Djibouti	14:15.86	
5	Iven Moise	Seychelles	14:39.16	
6	Mahaman Saidou Gonda	Niger	15:28.89	
7	Stoick Kasongo Kitunga	Democratic Republic of the Congo	15:42.86	
8	Claude Uitoza Zaire	Democratic Republic of the Congo	15:43.35	
9	Silwa Mapenzi Kasole	Democratic Republic of the Congo	16:24.97	
10	Evariste Mabiala Ngoma	Democratic Republic of the Congo	16:49.07	
	Hafid Rizky	Morocco	DNF	
	Mohamed Farès	Morocco	DNF	
	Desire Niyomwungere	Burundi	DNF	
	Denarvelle Matsogny	Republic of the Congo	DNS	
	Nicolae Alexandru Soare	Romania	DNS	

=== 10,000 metres ===
31 July

Rank	Name	Nationality	Time	Notes
1st place, gold medalist(s)	Moumin Bouh Guelleh	Djibouti	28:47.15	
2nd place, silver medalist(s)	Djamal Abdi Dirieh	Djibouti	28:50.31	
3rd place, bronze medalist(s)	Mouhcine Outalha	Morocco	28:55.48	
4	Lin Ndayifukamiye	Burundi	29:03.67	
5	Patrick Nimubona	Burundi	29:09.55	
6	Nicolae Alexandru Soare	Romania	29:28.86	
7	Alex Kabambale Paluku	Democratic Republic of the Congo	32:01.02	
8	Andre Baraka Kaboyi	Democratic Republic of the Congo	32:17.83	
9	Aniceto Oyono Ndong	Equatorial Guinea	35:52.79	
	Hicham Ouladha	Morocco	DNF	
	Hassan Toriss	Morocco	DNF	

=== Half marathon ===
4 August

Rank	Name	Nationality	Time	Notes
1st place, gold medalist(s)	Moumin Bouh Guelleh	Djibouti	1:02:48	GR
2nd place, silver medalist(s)	Mouhcine Outalha	Morocco	1:03:00	
3rd place, bronze medalist(s)	Djamal Abdi Dirieh	Djibouti	1:03:32	
4	Hassan Toriss	Morocco	1:05:04	
5	Lin Ndayifukamiye	Burundi	1:05:17	
6	Dieu-Merci Makorobondo	Democratic Republic of the Congo	1:05:50	
7	Justilin Foimi	Cameroon	1:08:14	
8	Alex Kabambale Paluku	Democratic Republic of the Congo	1:09:12	
9	Andre Baraka Kaboyi	Democratic Republic of the Congo	1:09:34	
10	Oumarou Agada Bara	Niger	1:10:47	
11	Abdoul Souley Oumarou	Niger	1:10:47	
12	Alpha Kabanga Mulumba	Democratic Republic of the Congo	1:12:27	
13	Jean Makola Kodila	Democratic Republic of the Congo	1:14:27	
14	David Kalimba Divin	Democratic Republic of the Congo	1:14:56	
15	Samuel Lukonda Wa Lukonda	Democratic Republic of the Congo	1:15:13	
16	Delphin Kalumba Wa Kalumba	Democratic Republic of the Congo	1:15:56	
17	Eliodor Mbuyi Wa Kukala	Democratic Republic of the Congo	1:17:05	
18	Pero Sompi Matondo	Democratic Republic of the Congo	2:01:20	
	Hicham Ouladha	Morocco	DNF	
	Elza Boy-Fini Sarabiro	Central African Republic	DNS	
	Leblanc Vlaode	Central African Republic	DNS	
	Zatara Ilunga Mande	Democratic Republic of the Congo	DNS	
	Evariste Mabiala Ngoma	Democratic Republic of the Congo	DNS	
	Claude Uitoza Zaire	Democratic Republic of the Congo	DNS	
	Silwa Mapenzi Kasole	Democratic Republic of the Congo	DNS	
	Alpha Mumbere Kamuha	Democratic Republic of the Congo	DNS	
	Aniceto Oyono Ndong	Equatorial Guinea	DNS	

=== 110 metres hurdles ===
Heats – 1 August
Wind:
Heat 1: +0.3 m/s, Heat 2: +0.5 m/s

Rank	Heat	Name	Nationality	Time	Notes
1	2	Louis François Mendy	Senegal	13.46	Q, GR
2	2	Saguirou Badamassi	Niger	13.68	Q
3	1	Jeremie Lararaudeuse	Mauritius	13.75	Q
4	1	Richard Diawara	Mali	13.85	Q
5	2	Alin Ionuț Anton	Romania	13.95	Q
6	1	Junior Effa Effa	Gabon	14.31	Q
7	1	Jorim Bangue	Cameroon	14.53	q
8	2	Amara Drame-Simonetto	Republic of the Congo	14.71	q
9	1	Nathan Nsakala	Democratic Republic of the Congo	15.04	
10	2	Augustin Nzuji Kalambayi	Democratic Republic of the Congo	20.09	
	1	Matteo Nelson Ngo	Cameroon	DNS	
	2	José Luis Borico Chene	Equatorial Guinea	DNS	
	2	Cameron Justin Ngo	Cameroon	DNS	

Final – 1 August

Wind: +0.7 m/s

Rank	Lane	Name	Nationality	Time	Notes
1st place, gold medalist(s)	6	Louis François Mendy	Senegal	13.38	GR
2nd place, silver medalist(s)	4	Saguirou Badamassi	Niger	13.67	
3rd place, bronze medalist(s)	5	Richard Diawara	Mali	13.69	
4	2	Alin Ionuț Anton	Romania	13.72	
5	7	Junior Effa Effa	Gabon	14.23	
6	8	Amara Drame-Simonetto	Republic of the Congo	14.26	
	1	Jorim Bangue	Cameroon	DNF	
	3	Jeremie Lararaudeuse	Mauritius	DNF	

=== 400 metres hurdles ===
Heats – 1 August

Rank	Heat	Name	Nationality	Time	Notes
1	1	Ousmane Sidibé	Senegal	50.35	Q, PB
2	1	Mohamed Amin Touati	Tunisia	50.52	Q
3	1	Saad Hinti	Morocco	51.36	Q
4	2	Bienvenu Sawadogo	Burkina Faso	52.02	Q
5	2	Marc Anthony Ibrahim	Lebanon	52.59	Q
6	2	Emmanuel Tamba Elengha	Republic of the Congo	52.92	Q, PB
7	1	Geraud Houessou	Benin	56.85	q
	2	Emmanuel Tshilemb Kamb	Democratic Republic of the Congo	DNF	
	1	Vicky Busa Ekoki	Democratic Republic of the Congo	DNS	

Final – 4 August

Rank	Lane	Name	Nationality	Time	Notes
1st place, gold medalist(s)	3	Saad Hinti	Morocco	49.32	PB
2nd place, silver medalist(s)	7	Ousmane Sidibé	Senegal	49.58	PB
3rd place, bronze medalist(s)	5	Bienvenu Sawadogo	Burkina Faso	50.34	
4	6	Marc Anthony Ibrahim	Lebanon	50.95	
5	8	Emmanuel Tamba Elengha	Republic of the Congo	52.06	NR
6	4	Mohamed Amin Touati	Tunisia	52.42	
	2	Geraud Houessou	Benin	DNF	

=== 3000 metres steeplechase ===
2 August

Rank	Name	Nationality	Time	Notes
1st place, gold medalist(s)	Mohamed Ismail Ibrahim	Djibouti	8:55.36	
2nd place, silver medalist(s)	Mohammed Tindouft	Morocco	8:55.37	
3rd place, bronze medalist(s)	Salaheddine Ben Yazide	Morocco	9:03.86	
4	Tahinjanahary Tsima	Madagascar	9:20.21	
5	Gautier Kakund Musans	Democratic Republic of the Congo	9:48.17	
6	Alpha Kabanga Mulumba	Democratic Republic of the Congo	10:22.90	
7	Mechack Mufunguzi Manga	Democratic Republic of the Congo	11:22.66	

=== 4 × 100 metres relay ===
2 August

Rank	Lane	Nation	Competitors	Time	Notes
1st place, gold medalist(s)	5	Ivory Coast	Gnamien Nehemie N'Goran, Ibrahim Diomande, Cheickna Traoré, Arthur Cissé	39.32	
2nd place, silver medalist(s)	7	Senegal	Lamine Diallo, Mamadou Fall Sarr, Oumar Ndoye, Louis François Mendy	39.66	
3rd place, bronze medalist(s)	1	Mauritius	Orphée Topize, Jonathan Bardottier, Noah Bibi, Joshan Vencatasamy	39.71	
4	6	Cameroon	Raymondo Nkwemy Tchomfa, Raphael Ngaguele Mberlina, Ibrahima Hamayadji, Claude Itoungue Bongogne	39.72	
5	2	Democratic Republic of the Congo	Stone Kabamb Preben, Lionel Tshimanga Muteba, Dominique Lasconi Mulamba, Olivier Sefu Mwimba	40.58	
6	8	Benin	Rémi Adandjo, Jérôme Kounou, Geraud Houessou, Didier Kiki	40.78	
	4	Republic of the Congo		DNS	

=== 4 × 400 metres relay ===
4 August

Rank	Lane	Nation	Competitors	Time	Notes
1st place, gold medalist(s)	6	Morocco	Rachid Mhamdi, Aymane El Haddaoui, Saad Hinti, Hamza Dair	3:03.44	
2nd place, silver medalist(s)	4	Senegal	Frédérick Mendy, Ousmane Sidibé, Lamine Diallo, Cheikh Tidiane Diouf	3:03.66	
3rd place, bronze medalist(s)	5	Lebanon	Noureddine Hadid, Marc Anthony Ibrahim, Ali Mourtada, Mohamad Mortada	3:11.74	NR
4	3	Benin	Rémi Adandjo, Jérôme Kounou, Geraud Houessou, Edmond Hounthon	3:14.36	
5	2	Republic of the Congo	Jacques Far Mboko Niamba, Tarek Oko Mbea Ngala Nene, Emmanuel Tamba Elengha, Amara Drame-Simonetto	3:16.94	
	7	Mali		DNS	
	8	Democratic Republic of the Congo		DNS	

=== 20 kilometres walk ===
4 August

Rank	Name	Nationality	Time	Penalties	Notes
1st place, gold medalist(s)	Ionuț Vasilică Pleșu	Romania	1:39:11		
2nd place, silver medalist(s)	Endry Muteb Sand	Democratic Republic of the Congo	1:53:52	~	
3rd place, bronze medalist(s)	Alain Mbayo Kazadi	Democratic Republic of the Congo	2:24:45		
4	Nsaku Kazadi	Democratic Republic of the Congo	2:42:01		
	Armand Bazoungoula	Republic of the Congo	DNF		
	Oseni Hardy	Democratic Republic of the Congo	DNS		
	Nganzim Takizala	Democratic Republic of the Congo	DNS		
	Silamite	Democratic Republic of the Congo	DNS		

=== High jump ===
4 August

Rank	Name	Nationality	1.85	1.90	1.95	2.00	2.05	2.10	2.15	2.18	Result	Notes
1st place, gold medalist(s)	Joseph Dezardin Prosper	Mauritius	–	o	–	o	o	o	xxo	xxx	2.15	PB
2nd place, silver medalist(s)	Fredy Kevin Oyono	Cameroon	–	–	o	o	o	xx–	x		2.05	
3rd place, bronze medalist(s)	Daniel Nsue Martínez	Equatorial Guinea	o	o	xo	o	xxx				2.00	
4	Elca-Charles Ambourouet	Gabon	–	o	xo	xo	xxx				2.00	
5	Marcel Mayack	Cameroon	–	o	xo	xxx					1.95	
6	Boubacar Diallo	Mali	–	o	–	xxx					1.90	
7	Jean-Paul Masanga Mekombo	Democratic Republic of the Congo	o	xxo	xxx						1.90	

=== Long jump ===
1 August

Rank	Name	Nationality	#1	#2	#3	#4	#5	#6	Result	Notes
1st place, gold medalist(s)	Appolinaire Yinra	Cameroon	x	7.52	7.76	x	x	7.99	7.99	PB
2nd place, silver medalist(s)	Fredy Kevin Oyono	Cameroon	x	7.72	7.84	x	x	x	7.84	PB
3rd place, bronze medalist(s)	Raymond Nkwemy Tchomfa	Cameroon	7.49	7.68	7.72	7.04	7.83	7.64	7.83	
4	Amath Faye	Senegal	7.79	x	7.77	7.53	7.72w	x	7.79	
5	Romeo N'tia	Benin	7.75	7.45	x	x	7.50	x	7.75	
6	Komi Bernard Konu	Togo	7.63	-7.65	7.72	x	7.36	7.39	7.72	
7	Zaid Latif	Morocco	7.56	7.54	7.28	x	x	x	7.56	
8	Archel Evrard Biniakounou	Republic of the Congo	7.42	x	x	–	x	–	7.42	
9	Lys Mendy	Senegal	7.29	x	7.11				7.29	
10	Gor Beglaryan	Armenia	x	x	7.25				7.25	
11	Moise Musonge Banza	Democratic Republic of the Congo	7.02	6.71	6.65				7.02	
12	Salem Al-Bloushi	United Arab Emirates	6.83	6.89	x				6.89	
13	Soumaîla Sabo	Burkina Faso	6.78	6.70	x				6.78	
14	Cedric Bikala Kabongo	Democratic Republic of the Congo	x	5.81	6.04				6.04	
15	Hussein Mohamed Mutshapa	Democratic Republic of the Congo	5.92	x	5.67				5.92	
16	Gregorio Ndong Oye	Equatorial Guinea	5.41	5.74	5.72				5.74	
	Serge Morissi Belandombi	Central African Republic							DNS	

=== Triple jump ===
3 August

Rank	Name	Nationality	#1	#2	#3	#4	#5	#6	Result	Notes
1st place, gold medalist(s)	Hugues Fabrice Zango	Burkina Faso	16.91	16.95	x	16.45	x	17.11	17.11	
2nd place, silver medalist(s)	Amath Faye	Senegal	x	16.61	16.26	16.24	–	x	16.61	PB
3rd place, bronze medalist(s)	Levon Aghasyan	Armenia	15.41	15.42	16.40	x	16.34	x	16.40	
4	Raymond Nkwemy Tchomfa	Cameroon	15.82	16.10	16.38	15.97	16.38	x	16.38	
5	Yacouba Loue	Burkina Faso	15.33	x	15.24	x	15.86	x	15.86	
6	Marcel Mayack	Cameroon	15.34	15.68	15.48	15.35	x	15.35	15.68	
7	Komi Bernard Konu	Togo	15.45	x	15.13	x	14.47	15.05	15.45	
8	Siriman Sissoko	Mali	15.01	13.01	15.09	x	–	14.30	15.09	
9	Soumaîla Sabo	Burkina Faso	15.07w	14.96	14.81				15.07w	
10	Cedric Bikala Kabongo	Democratic Republic of the Congo	13.70	r					13.70	
	José Luis Borico Chene	Equatorial Guinea	x	r					NM	
	Serge Morissi Belandombi	Central African Republic							DNS	
	Hussein Mohamed Mutshapa	Democratic Republic of the Congo							DNS	

=== Shot put ===
4 August

Rank	Name	Nationality	#1	#2	#3	#4	#5	#6	Result	Notes
1st place, gold medalist(s)	Marius Constantin Musteață	Romania	18.87	18.46	19.56	19.48	18.81	x	19.56	
2nd place, silver medalist(s)	Muhamet Ramadani	Kosovo	17.80	18.16	18.36	x	x	18.04	18.36	
3rd place, bronze medalist(s)	Bernard Baptiste	Mauritius	16.93	x	17.24	17.80	x	18.02	18.02	
4	Billy Jospen Takougoum Kuitche	Cameroon	16.73	x	16.12	x	x	x	16.73	
5	Lors Masiantima Yitu	Democratic Republic of the Congo	11.33	10.23	10.73	9.46	11.04	11.40	11.40	
	Sie Fahige Kambou	Burkina Faso							DNS	
	Benjamin Ilunga Mwepu	Democratic Republic of the Congo							DNS	
	Gedeon Kalonda Nyandwe	Democratic Republic of the Congo							DNS	
	Alin Alexandru Firfirica	Romania							DNS	

=== Discus throw ===
1 August

Rank	Name	Nationality	#1	#2	#3	#4	#5	#6	Result	Notes
1st place, gold medalist(s)	Alin Alexandru Firfirica	Romania	61.64	64.08	64.39	63.85	63.60	63.33	64.39	
2nd place, silver medalist(s)	Christopher Sophie	Mauritius	55.46	59.78	x	54.46	56.03	56.55	59.78	NR
3rd place, bronze medalist(s)	Marius Constantin Musteață	Romania	46.72	46.37	51.25	49.57	50.02	x	51.25	
4	Sie Fahige Kambou	Burkina Faso	46.89	x	47.54	x	x	50.82	50.82	
5	Lors Masiantima Yitu	Democratic Republic of the Congo	26.75	x	x	x	32.36	32.70	32.70	
6	Johns Bakakenga Kayembe	Democratic Republic of the Congo	25.73	28.04	27.75	23.33	x	27.15	28.04	

=== Hammer throw ===
31 July

Rank	Name	Nationality	#1	#2	#3	#4	#5	#6	Result	Notes
1st place, gold medalist(s)	Jean Ian Carre	Mauritius	52.50	50.52	50.10	x	x	x	52.50	
2nd place, silver medalist(s)	Romeo Manzila Mahambou	Republic of the Congo	x	x	x	x	30.76	x	30.76	
3rd place, bronze medalist(s)	Gedeon Kalonda Nyandwe	Republic of the Congo	25.71	25.65	28.18	27.54	28.18	28.01	28.18	
4	Benhim Benime Kitsa	Democratic Republic of the Congo	x	20.26	19.47	20.28	20.95	21.54	21.54	
5	Johns Bakakenga Kayembe	Democratic Republic of the Congo	20.45	19.92	18.26	17.67	20.69	20.33	20.69	

=== Javelin throw ===
4 August

Rank	Name	Nationality	#1	#2	#3	#4	#5	#6	Result	Notes
1st place, gold medalist(s)	Alexandru Novac	Romania	x	81.97	84.75	x	x	x	84.75	GR
2nd place, silver medalist(s)	Denis Adrian Both	Romania	71.89	71.40	69.10	68.52	x	x	71.89	
3rd place, bronze medalist(s)	Prince Yannick Kibaya	Republic of the Congo	56.84	57.92	61.70	60.95	61.62	65.86	65.86	
4	Romaric Huoénou	Benin	59.75	58.25	54.28	60.00	x	64.95	64.95	NR
5	Gedeon Kalonda Nyandwe	Democratic Republic of the Congo	34.91	37.69	44.11	33.08	42.61	48.72	48.72	
6	Eric Kasongo	Democratic Republic of the Congo	–	–	–	x	33.18	38.89	38.89	
7	Benjamin Ilunga Mwepu	Democratic Republic of the Congo	x	34.69	37.34	29.83	34.62	34.54	37.34	

=== Decathlon ===
2–3 August

The highest mark recorded in each event is highlighted in yellow

Rank	Athlete	Nationality	100m	LJ	SP	HJ	400m	110m H	DT	PV	JT	1500m	Points	Notes
1st place, gold medalist(s)	Daniel Malach	Switzerland	10.96	7.10	14.03	1.92	49.63	15.64	42.77	4.10	55.62	5:00.63	7369	
2nd place, silver medalist(s)	Nino Portmann	Switzerland	10.61	7.20	13.86	1.89	48.90	15.25	38.11	3.90	52.51	4:59.04	7329	
3rd place, bronze medalist(s)	Joel Tshikamba Kankonde	Democratic Republic of the Congo	11.46	6.29w	10.23	1.74	50.64	16.65	32.26	2.00	37.49	4:55.07	5576	
4	Van Muyombo Kanz	Democratic Republic of the Congo	12.17	6.24	8.97	1.77	56.37	17.72	20.68	2.20	33.46	4:57.25	4767	
	Samuel Staub	Switzerland	DNS	–	–	–	–	–	–	–	–	–	DNS	

== Women's results ==
=== 100 metres ===
Heats – 31 July
Wind:
Heat 1: +0.9 m/s, Heat 2: +1.0 m/s, Heat 3: -0.4 m/s, Heat 4: -0.5 m/s

Rank	Heat	Name	Nationality	Time	Notes
1	1	Maboundou Koné	Ivory Coast	11.19	Q, PB
2	4	Natacha Ngoye	Republic of the Congo	11.31	Q, NR
3	3	Jessika Gbai	Ivory Coast	11.39	Q
4	2	Claudine Njarasoa	Madagascar	11.42	Q
5	4	Madina Touré	Burkina Faso	11.51	Q
6	1	Pierrick-Linda Moulin	Gabon	11.58	Q
7	2	Herverge Kole Etame	Cameroon	11.68	Q
8	3	Lena Weiss	Switzerland	11.85	Q
9	3	Marie Lydia Moirt	Mauritius	11.93	Q, PB
10	1	Marie Amelie Anthony	Mauritius	12.01	Q
11	3	Marina Andreea Baboi	Romania	12.03	q
12	1	Stéphanie Njuh Nstella	Cameroon	12.04	q
13	2	Akouvi Judith Koumedzina	Togo	12.11	Q
14	4	Saran Hadja Kouyate	Guinea	12.13	Q
15	3	Mbikou Frejus Taty	Republic of the Congo	12.18	q, PB
16	3	Irène Bell Bonong	Cameroon	12.21	q
17	4	Béatrice Midomide	Benin	12.43	
18	1	Raissa Kabedi Kyembo	Democratic Republic of the Congo	12.52	
19	4	Marianna Baghyan	Armenia	12.56	
20	2	Christelle Lutandila Mbaku	Democratic Republic of the Congo	12.62	
21	4	Françoise Kumi Bango	Democratic Republic of the Congo	12.92	
22	4	Alba Rosana Mbo Nchama	Equatorial Guinea	12.96	
23	1	Brena Chiamaka Nsorom	Equatorial Guinea	13.03	
24	2	Fatma Al-Blooshi	United Arab Emirates	13.16	
25	3	Erica Mouwangui	Equatorial Guinea	13.30	
26	2	Sefora Ada Eto	Equatorial Guinea	13.73	

Semifinals – 31 July
Wind:
Heat 1: +0.5 m/s, Heat 2: -0.2 m/s

Rank	Heat	Name	Nationality	Time	Notes
1	2	Maboundou Koné	Ivory Coast	11.17	Q, PB
2	1	Natacha Ngoye	Republic of the Congo	11.22	Q, NR
3	1	Jessika Gbai	Ivory Coast	11.27	Q
4	2	Claudine Njarasoa	Madagascar	11.50	Q
5	2	Madina Touré	Burkina Faso	11.51	Q
6	2	Lena Weiss	Switzerland	11.55	q
7	1	Pierrick-Linda Moulin	Gabon	11.57	Q
8	1	Herverge Kole Etame	Cameroon	11.73	q
9	2	Marina Andreea Baboi	Romania	11.97	
10	1	Stéphanie Njuh Nstella	Cameroon	11.97	
10	2	Marie Lydia Moirt	Mauritius	11.97	
12	1	Marie Amelie Anthony	Mauritius	12.05	
13	2	Mbikou Frejus Taty	Republic of the Congo	12.15	
14	1	Irène Bell Bonong	Cameroon	12.17	
15	1	Akouvi Judith Koumedzina	Togo	12.19	
16	2	Saran Hadja Kouyate	Guinea	12.26	

]

Final – 1 August
Wind: -1.0 m/s

Rank	Lane	Name	Nationality	Time	Notes
1st place, gold medalist(s)	3	Maboundou Koné	Ivory Coast	11.24	
2nd place, silver medalist(s)	6	Jessika Gbai	Ivory Coast	11.38	
3rd place, bronze medalist(s)	5	Natacha Ngoye	Republic of the Congo	11.44	
4	4	Claudine Njarasoa	Madagascar	11.51	
5	2	Madina Touré	Burkina Faso	11.66	
6	7	Pierrick-Linda Moulin	Gabon	11.69	
7	1	Lena Weiss	Switzerland	11.70	
8	8	Herverge Kole Etame	Cameroon	11.81	

=== 200 metres ===
Heats – 3 August
Wind:
Heat 1: -0.2 m/s, Heat 2: +1.0 m/s, Heat 3: +0.9 m/s, Heat 4: +0.7 m/s

Rank	Heat	Name	Nationality	Time	Notes
1	3	Jessika Gbai	Ivory Coast	22.97	Q
2	1	Natacha Ngoye Akamabi	Republic of the Congo	23.01	Q, NR
3	4	Maboundou Koné	Ivory Coast	23.33	Q
4	2	Sara El Hachimi	Morocco	23.77	Q
5	3	Claudine Njarasoa	Madagascar	23.83	Q
6	1	Herverge Kole Etame	Cameroon	23.86	Q
7	2	Maria Bisericescu	Romania	24.04	Q
8	3	Lydia Marie Moirt	Mauritius	24.09	Q
9	1	Aziza Sbaity	Lebanon	24.17	Q
10	2	Juliana Djamat-Dubois	Ivory Coast	24.21	Q
11	3	Marina Andreea Baboi	Romania	24.27	q
12	4	Stéphanie Njuh Nstella	Cameroon	24.32	Q
13	2	Marie Amelie Anthony	Mauritius	24.41	q
14	2	Elodie Malessara	Republic of the Congo	24.43	q
15	2	Madina Touré	Burkina Faso	24.43	q
16	1	Saran Hadja Kouyate	Guinea	24.98	
17	1	Akouvi Judith Koumedzina	Togo	25.24	
18	1	Marianna Baghyan	Armenia	25.77	
19	4	Françoise Kumi Bango	Democratic Republic of the Congo	25.81	Q
20	3	Béatrice Midomide	Benin	26.32	
21	4	Alba Rosana Nchama Mbo	Equatorial Guinea	26.66	
22	1	Fatma Al-Blooshi	United Arab Emirates	27.49	
23	3	Erica Mouwangui	Equatorial Guinea	27.75	
24	2	Sefora Ada Eto	Equatorial Guinea	28.67	
	2	Divine Kandomba Elos	Democratic Republic of the Congo	DNS	
	3	Halimatou Camara	Guinea	DNS	
	4	Marcelle Bouele Bondo	Republic of the Congo	DNS	
	4	Pierrick Linda Moulin	Gabon	DNS	
	4	Brena Chiamaka Nsorom	Equatorial Guinea	DNS	

Semifinals – 3 August
Wind:
Heat 1: +0.6 m/s, Heat 2: -0.2 m/s

Rank	Heat	Name	Nationality	Time	Notes
1	2	Jessika Gbai	Ivory Coast	22.77	Q
1	1	Maboundou Koné	Ivory Coast	22.82	Q
2	2	Sara El Hachimi	Morocco	23.39	Q, PB
2	1	Herverge Kole Etame	Cameroon	23.77	Q, PB
3	1	Aziza Sbaity	Lebanon	23.79	Q
3	2	Claudine Njarasoa	Madagascar	23.82	Q, PB
4	1	Juliana Djamat-Dubois	Ivory Coast	23.89	q
5	1	Maria Bisericescu	Romania	23.89	q
4	2	Lydia Marie Moirt	Mauritius	24.01	PB
5	2	Stéphanie Njuh Nstella	Cameroon	24.16	
6	1	Marie Amelie Anthony	Mauritius	24.24	
6	2	Elodie Malessara	Republic of the Congo	24.52	
7	2	Françoise Kumi Bango	Democratic Republic of the Congo	25.66	
	2	Marina Andreea Baboi	Romania	DQ	R16.7
	1	Madina Touré	Burkina Faso	DNS	
	1	Natacha Ngoye Akamabi	Republic of the Congo	DNS	

Final – 4 August

Wind: -0.7 m/s

Rank	Lane	Name	Nationality	Time	Notes
1st place, gold medalist(s)	7	Jessika Gbai	Ivory Coast	22.43	GR
2nd place, silver medalist(s)	6	Maboundou Koné	Ivory Coast	22.53	
3rd place, bronze medalist(s)	5	Sara El Hachimi	Morocco	23.22	NR
4	8	Herverge Kole Etame	Cameroon	23.60	PB
5	4	Claudine Njarasoa	Madagascar	23.78	PB
6	1	Maria Bisericescu	Romania	23.91	
7	3	Aziza Sbaity	Lebanon	23.95	
8	2	Juliana Djamat-Dubois	Ivory Coast	24.43	

=== 400 metres ===
Heats – 31 July

Rank	Heat	Name	Nationality	Time	Notes
1	2	Sara El Hachimi	Morocco	53.09	Q, PB
2	2	Sita Sibiri	Burkina Faso	53.56	Q, NR
3	2	Samira Awal	Niger	53.81	Q, PB
4	1	Michelle Gröbli	Switzerland	53.84	Q
5	1	Salma Lehlali	Morocco	53.99	Q, PB
6	2	Marcelle Bouele Bondo	Republic of the Congo	54.93	q
7	1	Elodie Malessara	Republic of the Congo	56.99	Q
8	1	Divine Kandomba Elos	Democratic Republic of the Congo	59.59	q
9	2	Emelyne Manirakiza	Burundi	59.63	
10	2	Priscile Majita Ndongo	Democratic Republic of the Congo	1:00.91	
	1	Alba Rosana Nchamba Mbo	Equatorial Guinea	DNS	

Final – 1 August

Rank	Lane	Name	Nationality	Time	Notes
1st place, gold medalist(s)	4	Sara El Hachimi	Morocco	52.62	PB
2nd place, silver medalist(s)	5	Sita Sibiri	Burkina Faso	53.13	NR
3rd place, bronze medalist(s)	3	Samira Awal	Niger	53.39	PB
4	7	Michelle Gröbli	Switzerland	54.50	
5	6	Salma Lehlali	Morocco	54.73	
6	8	Elodie Malessara	Republic of the Congo	54.97	
7	2	Marcelle Bouele Bondo	Republic of the Congo	55.51	
8	1	Divine Kandomba Elos	Democratic Republic of the Congo	1:00.29	

=== 800 metres ===
Heats – 3 August

Rank	Heat	Name	Nationality	Time	Notes
1	1	Assia Raziki	Morocco	2:11.87	Q
2	1	Fathia Abdillahi Ladieh	Djibouti	2:12.79	Q
3	1	Ellada Alaverdyan	Armenia	2:13.36	Q
4	2	Cristina Daniela Balan	Romania	2:15.16	Q
5	2	Odette Sawekoua	Benin	2:15.25	Q
6	2	Soukaina Hajji	Morocco	2:15.35	Q
7	2	Wafa Zaroual	Morocco	2:16.20	q
8	1	Chamsiya Yahaya	Niger	2:23.84	q
9	1	Gracia Mujinga Yav	Democratic Republic of the Congo	2:26.84	
10	2	Monique Kamina Tshisambu	Democratic Republic of the Congo	2:34.52	
	1	Adèle Mafogang Tenkeu	Cameroon	DNF	
	2	Anais Bourgoin	France	DNS	
	2	Gentille Safi Sanzabandi	Democratic Republic of the Congo	DNS	

Final – 4 August

Rank	Name	Nationality	Time	Notes
1st place, gold medalist(s)	Assia Raziki	Morocco	2:09.45	
2nd place, silver medalist(s)	Soukaina Hajji	Morocco	2:09.67	
3rd place, bronze medalist(s)	Cristina Daniela Balan	Romania	2:10.28	
4	Odette Sawekoua	Benin	2:11.78	PB
5	Wafa Zaroual	Morocco	2:12.88	
6	Ellada Alaverdyan	Armenia	2:16.38	
7	Fathia Abdillahi Ladieh	Djibouti	2:17.36	
8	Chamsiya Yahaya	Niger	2:30.01	

=== 1500 metres ===
1 August

Rank	Name	Nationality	Time	Notes
1st place, gold medalist(s)	Wafa Zaroual	Morocco	4:44.55	
2nd place, silver medalist(s)	Soukaina Hajji	Morocco	4:44.98	
3rd place, bronze medalist(s)	Rababe Arafi	Morocco	4:45.42	
4	Lenuța Simiuc	Romania	4:45.44	
5	Odette Sawekoua	Benin	4:49.73	
6	Fathia Abdillahi Ladieh	Djibouti	4:50.65	
7	Gracia Mujinga Yav	Democratic Republic of the Congo	4:57.95	
8	Clarisse Asifiwe Nzabava	Democratic Republic of the Congo	5:07.31	

=== 5000 metres ===
3 August

Rank	Name	Nationality	Time	Notes
1st place, gold medalist(s)	Rahma Tahiri	Morocco	15:56.71	GR
2nd place, silver medalist(s)	Kaoutar Farkoussi	Morocco	15:57.91	
3rd place, bronze medalist(s)	Soukaina Atanane	Morocco	16:05.34	
4	Samiyah Hassan Nour	Djibouti	16:28.89	
5	Mădălina Elena Sîrbu	Romania	17:20.35	
6	Alice Gisubizu	Democratic Republic of the Congo	18:32.75	
7	Wa-Mbayo Masangu	Democratic Republic of the Congo	21:57.06	

=== 10,000 metres ===
1 August

Rank	Name	Nationality	Time	Notes
1st place, gold medalist(s)	Soukaina Atanane	Morocco	33:01.25	
2nd place, silver medalist(s)	Kaoutar Farkoussi	Morocco	33:11.67	
3rd place, bronze medalist(s)	Samiyah Hassan Nour	Djibouti	33:21.50	
4	Hanane Qallouj	Morocco	34:10.74	
5	Mădălina Elena Sîrbu	Romania	34:50.97	
6	Selina Ummel	Switzerland	35:19.43	
7	Seraina Ummel	Switzerland	36:41.38	
8	Alice Gisubizu	Democratic Republic of the Congo	39:06.13	
	Ritha Tumaini Nzabava	Democratic Republic of the Congo	DNS	

=== Half marathon ===
4 August

Rank	Name	Nationality	Time	Notes
1st place, gold medalist(s)	Rahma Tahiri	Morocco	1:13:23	GR
2nd place, silver medalist(s)	Hanane Qallouj	Morocco	1:13:46	
3rd place, bronze medalist(s)	Selina Ummel	Switzerland	1:17:08	
4	Ritha Tumaini Nzabava	Democratic Republic of the Congo	1:18:06	NR
5	Seraina Ummel	Switzerland	1:18:23	
6	Bijou Masirika Botya	Democratic Republic of the Congo	1:32:08	
	Adelina Paulina Dumitrescu	Romania	DNF	
	Alice Gisubizu	Democratic Republic of the Congo	DNS	

=== 100 metres hurdles ===
1 August
Wind: +0.7 m/s

Rank	Lane	Name	Nationality	Time	Notes
1st place, gold medalist(s)	8	Sidonie Fiadanantsoa	Madagascar	13.01	PB
2nd place, silver medalist(s)	4	Anamaria Nesteriuc	Romania	13.20	
3rd place, bronze medalist(s)	1	Larissa Bertényi	Switzerland	13.58	
4	5	Madina Touré	Burkina Faso	13.77	PB
5	6	Naomi Akakpo	Togo	13.81	
6	3	Safietou Boye	Senegal	14.21	
7	2	Adèle Mafogang Tenkeu	Cameroon	15.11	
	7	Marthe Koala	Burkina Faso	DQ	R16.8

=== 400 metres hurdles ===
4 August

Rank	Lane	Name	Nationality	Time	Notes
1st place, gold medalist(s)	6	Noura Ennadi	Morocco	55.17	
2nd place, silver medalist(s)	8	Linda Angounou	Cameroon	56.68	
3rd place, bronze medalist(s)	5	Sita Sibiri	Burkina Faso	58.04	
4	4	Alizée Rusca	Switzerland	58.44	
5	1	Patrone Kouvoutoukila	Republic of the Congo	59.54	NR
6	2	Fiona Ribeaud	Switzerland	1:02.20	
	3	Mahra Enqelya	United Arab Emirates	DNS	
	7	Saphietou Boye	Senegal	DNS	

=== 3000 metres steeplechase ===
4 August

Rank	Name	Nationality	Time	Notes
1st place, gold medalist(s)	Ikram Ouaaziz	Morocco	9:52.74	
2nd place, silver medalist(s)	Gresa Bakraqi	Kosovo	10:48.25	
3rd place, bronze medalist(s)	Clarisse Asifiwe Nzabava	Democratic Republic of the Congo	12:11.53	NR
4	Jibsy Simba Vangu	Democratic Republic of the Congo	12:16.09	

=== 4 × 100 metres relay ===
2 August

Rank	Lane	Nation	Competitors	Time	Notes
1st place, gold medalist(s)	5	Cameroon	Stéphanie Njuh Nsella, Linda Angounou Ngouayaka, Irène Bell Bonong, Herverge Kole Etame	44.78	
2nd place, silver medalist(s)	4	Republic of the Congo	Marcelle Bouele Bondo, Elodie Malessara, Patrone Kouvoutoukila, Natacha Ngoye Akambi	45.49	NR
3rd place, bronze medalist(s)	3	Romania	Cristina Daniela Balan, Maria Bisericescu, Anamaria Nesteriuc, Marina Andreea Baboi	45.56	
4	6	Democratic Republic of the Congo	Divine Kandomba Elos, Françoise Kumi Bango, Christel Lutandila Mbaku, Raissa Kabedi Kyembo	49.15	NR
	2	Equatorial Guinea		DNS	

=== 4 × 400 metres relay ===
4 August

Rank	Lane	Nation	Competitors	Time	Notes
1st place, gold medalist(s)	5	Morocco	Salma Lehlali, Assia Raziki, Sara El Hachimi, Noura Ennadi	3:33.89	NR
2nd place, silver medalist(s)	6	Cameroon	Irène Bell Bonong, Adèle Mafogang Tenkeu, Herverge Kole Etame, Linda Angounou	3:40.84	
3rd place, bronze medalist(s)	7	Romania	Marina Andreea Baboi, Lenuța Simiuc, Anamaria Nesteriuc, Cristina Daniela Balan	3:45.57	
4	3	Republic of the Congo	Elodie Malessara, Carole Kiyindou Banzouzi, Mbikou Frejus Taty, Patrone Kouvoutoukila	3:51.03	
	4	Democratic Republic of the Congo		DNS	

=== 20 kilometres walk ===
4 August

Rank	Name	Nationality	Time	Penalties	Notes
1st place, gold medalist(s)	Mihaela Popa	Romania	1:47:36		
2nd place, silver medalist(s)	Beatrice Hamidou Tayki'oo	Cameroon	1:54:35		NR
3rd place, bronze medalist(s)	Gracia Ladisa Munzeza	Democratic Republic of the Congo	2:04:54	<	NR
4	Laetitia Mokone Nzalia	Democratic Republic of the Congo	2:29:18		
	Monique Kyembe Kila	Democratic Republic of the Congo	DNF		
	Azora Kambale Muhasa	Democratic Republic of the Congo	DNS		
	Moulouxe Salumu Amisi	Democratic Republic of the Congo	DNS		
	Badida Tshibangu	Democratic Republic of the Congo	DNS		
	Kanyinda Kabeya	Democratic Republic of the Congo	DNS		

=== High jump ===
1 August

Rank	Name	Nationality	1.50	1.55	1.60	1.65	1.70	1.73	1.76	1.79	Result	Notes
1st place, gold medalist(s)	Fatoumata Balley	Guinea	–	–	–	–	–	–	xo	xxx	1.76	
2nd place, silver medalist(s)	Federica Gabriela Apostol	Romania	–	–	–	o	o	o	xxx		1.73	
3rd place, bronze medalist(s)	Rhizlane Siba	Morocco	–	–	–	o	xxo	xo	xxx		1.73	
4	Adèle Mafogang Tenkeu	Cameroon	o	xxo	xxx						1.55	
	Jedilesse Baleba Tini	Republic of the Congo	xx								NM	

=== Long jump ===
2 August

Rank	Name	Nationality	#1	#2	#3	#4	#5	#6	Result	Notes
1st place, gold medalist(s)	Marthe Koala	Burkina Faso	6.94	–	x	6.56	–	x	6.94	GR, NR
2nd place, silver medalist(s)	Yousra Lajdoud	Morocco	5.95	6.29	6.28	6.53	6.28	6.55	6.55	NR
3rd place, bronze medalist(s)	Véronique Kossenda Rey	Cameroon	6.32	6.26	6.42	6.29	6.10	6.16	6.42	
4	Fayza Issaka Abdou Kerim	Togo	5.88	6.18	6.09	5.72	5.90	6.05	6.18	
5	Florentine Razanamandroso	Madagascar	5.77w	5.58	5.87	5.90	5.84	5.68	5.90	
6	Adèle Mafogang Tenkeu	Cameroon	5.06	5.62	5.44	5.63	5.74	5.60	5.74	
7	Jedilesse Baleba Tini	Republic of the Congo	5.33	5.21	5.43	5.15	5.32	5.32	5.43	
8	Yana Sargsyan	Armenia	5.23	r					5.23	
	Michelle Kasama Fokam	Cameroon							DNS	
	Françoise Kumi Bango	Democratic Republic of the Congo							DNS	

=== Triple jump ===
4 August

Rank	Name	Nationality	#1	#2	#3	#4	#5	#6	Result	Notes
1st place, gold medalist(s)	Saly Sarr	Senegal	x	14.00	13.39	x	13.18	13.44	14.00	PB
2nd place, silver medalist(s)	Véronique Kossenda Rey	Cameroon	13.93w	13.72	13.87	x	13.96	13.97	13.97	PB
3rd place, bronze medalist(s)	Diana Ana Maria Ion	Romania	13.74	x	13.94	x	13.93	13.91	13.94	
4	Liliane Potiron	Mauritius	13.59	13.56	13.80	x	x	x	13.80	NR
5	Sangone Kandji	Senegal	12.99	13.19w	x	12.86	13.14	x	13.19w	
6	Fayza Issaka Abdou Kerim	Togo	12.36	13.08	12.80	x	12.87	12.71	13.08	
	Yana Sargsyan	Armenia							DNS	
	Michelle Kasama Fokam	Cameroon							DNS	

=== Shot put ===
31 July

Rank	Name	Nationality	#1	#2	#3	#4	#5	#6	Result	Notes
1st place, gold medalist(s)	Frédéric Lemongo Nkoulou	Cameroon	14.87	14.81	14.57	14.56	14.80	14.99	14.99	
2nd place, silver medalist(s)	Nora Monie	Cameroon	13.41	8.61	14.27	14.74	14.18	14.41	14.74	
3rd place, bronze medalist(s)	Nassira Koné	Mali	11.77	11.61	11.59	12.16	11.58	12.26	12.26	
4	Brigitte Tchede	Benin	11.53	11.00	11.52	11.89	11.80	x	11.89	
	Rose Mulambavu Tiba	Democratic Republic of the Congo							DNS	

=== Discus throw ===
2 August

Rank	Name	Nationality	#1	#2	#3	#4	#5	#6	Result	Notes
1st place, gold medalist(s)	Nora Monie	Cameroon	55.17	50.24	57.81	56.69	54.88	x	57.81	
2nd place, silver medalist(s)	Yelena Mokoka Sala	Democratic Republic of the Congo	50.46	53.79	x	53.70	53.85	x	53.85	NR
3rd place, bronze medalist(s)	Andreea Iuliana Lungu	Romania	x	x	51.01	49.35	50.05	48.38	51.01	
4	Brigitte Tchede	Benin	32.68	38.36	x	38.53	x	37.93	38.53	
5	Nassira Koné	Mali	x	x	31.53	25.20	x	29.84	31.53	

=== Hammer throw ===
4 August

Rank	Name	Nationality	#1	#2	#3	#4	#5	#6	Result	Notes
1st place, gold medalist(s)	Bianca Ghelber	Romania	70.67	70.63	73.20	70.75	72.94	71.55	73.20	
2nd place, silver medalist(s)	Juliane Clair	Mauritius	51.26	x	53.45	x	51.47	x	53.45	PB
3rd place, bronze medalist(s)	Exaucee Koussalouka	Republic of the Congo	10.67	45.74	45.81	45.77	41.59	19.27	45.81	
4	Nora Monie	Cameroon	32.46	x	33.50	39.60	x	35.98	39.60	
5	Rosie Mulambavu Tiba	Democratic Republic of the Congo	x	x	x	x	20.65	22.36	22.36	

=== Javelin throw ===
3 August

Rank	Name	Nationality	#1	#2	#3	#4	#5	#6	Result	Notes
1st place, gold medalist(s)	Selma Rosun	Mauritius	46.20	47.91	44.14	47.44	45.98	x	47.91	
2nd place, silver medalist(s)	Vanessa Colin	Mauritius	40.55	42.54	43.49	x	45.38	x	45.38	
3rd place, bronze medalist(s)	Rosie Mulambavu Tiba	Democratic Republic of the Congo	37.56	30.39	32.86	35.95	38.55	39.10	39.10	
