= 2024 African Championships in Athletics – Men's 100 metres =

Men's 100 metres at the 2024 African Championships in Athletics
- Venue: Japoma Stadium
- Location: Douala, Cameroon
- Dates: 21 June (heats); 22 June (semi-finals & final)
- Competitors: 63 from 29 nations
- Winning time: 10.13

Medalists
gold medal	Joseph Fahnbulleh	Liberia
silver medal	Emmanuel Eseme	Cameroon
bronze medal	Benjamin Richardson	South Africa

The men's 100 metres event at the 2024 African Championships in Athletics was held on 21 and 22 June in Douala, Cameroon.

== Records ==
Records before the 2024 African Athletics Championships
Record	Athlete (nation)	Time (s)	Location	Date
World record	Usain Bolt (JAM)	9.58	Berlin, Germany	16 August 2009
African record	Ferdinand Omanyala (KEN)	9.77	Nairobi, Kenya	18 September 2021
Championship record	Seun Ogunkoya (NGR)	9.94	Dakar, Senegal	19 August 1998
World leading	Ferdinand Omanyala (KEN)	9.79	Nairobi, Kenya	15 June 2024
African leading	Ferdinand Omanyala (KEN)	9.79	Nairobi, Kenya	15 June 2024

== Results ==
=== Heats ===
Held on 21 June. First 2 of each heat (Q) and the next 6 fastest (q) qualified for the semi-finals.

Wind:
Heat 1: +1.1 m/s, Heat 2: +0.1 m/s, Heat 3: +1.1 m/s, Heat 4: +1.2 m/s, Heat 5: 0.0 m/s, Heat 6: +2.0 m/s, Heat 7: 0.0 m/s, Heat 8: +1.0 m/s, Heat 9: +2.0 m/s

Rank	Heat	Name	Nationality	Time	Notes
1	8	Benjamin Richardson	South Africa	10.14	Q
2	7	Bayanda Walaza	South Africa	10.15	Q
3	3	Kayinsola Ajayi	Nigeria	10.21	Q
4	5	Noah Bibi	Mauritius	10.28	Q
4	7	Raphael Ngaguele Mberlina	Cameroon	10.28	Q
6	6	Letsile Tebogo	Botswana	10.29	Q
7	6	Mamadou Fall Sarr	Senegal	10.34	Q
7	6	Mojela Koneshe	Lesotho	10.34	q
7	8	Ebrahima Camara	Gambia	10.34	Q
10	4	Tapiwanashe Makarawu	Zimbabwe	10.35	Q
11	4	Usheoritse Itsekiri	Nigeria	10.36	Q
12	7	Ibrahim Diomande	Ivory Coast	10.40	q
13	3	Isaac Botsio	Ghana	10.41	Q
13	7	Stephen Abosi	Botswana	10.41	q
15	8	Sibusiso Matsenjwa	Eswatini	10.42	q
15	9	Bradley Nkoana	South Africa	10.42	Q
17	4	Adama Jammeh	Gambia	10.43	q
18	2	Joseph Fahnbulleh	Liberia	10.45	Q
18	6	Mark Odhiambo	Kenya	10.45	q
20	1	Emmanuel Eseme	Cameroon	10.49	Q
20	2	Edwin Gadayi	Ghana	10.49	Q
20	5	Ismael Koné	Ivory Coast	10.49	Q
23	2	Godson Oghenebrume	Nigeria	10.51	
23	5	Lionnel Muteba	Democratic Republic of the Congo	10.51	
25	8	Dickson Kamungeremu	Zimbabwe	10.52	
26	4	Gilbert Hainuca	Namibia	10.53	
26	8	Ibrahima Hamayadji	Cameroon	10.53	
28	3	Dominique Lasconi Mulamba	Democratic Republic of the Congo	10.54	
29	2	Ngoni Makusha	Zimbabwe	10.55	
30	1	Olivier Mwimba	Democratic Republic of the Congo	10.57	Q
30	7	Moulaye Sonko	Senegal	10.57	
32	4	Brock Appiah	Ghana	10.58	
33	5	Steven Sabino	Mozambique	10.59	
33	9	Alieu Joof	Gambia	10.59	Q
35	5	Omar Ndoye	Senegal	10.61	
35	9	Hatago Murere	Namibia	10.61	
37	9	Wissy Frank Hoye Yenda Moukoula	Gabon	10.62	
38	4	Fode Sissoko	Mali	10.63	
38	4	Dyland Sicobo	Seychelles	10.63	
40	3	Thandaza Zwane	Eswatini	10.66	
41	1	Thuto Masasa	Botswana	10.67	
42	2	Meshack Babu	Kenya	10.68	
43	6	Mcebo Mkhaliphi	Eswatini	10.70	
44	1	John Sherman	Liberia	10.71	
44	8	Noah Lawson	Togo	10.71	
46	1	David Nguema Allogho	Gabon	10.73	
47	7	Seco Camara	Guinea-Bissau	10.81	
48	3	Kouadio Éric Kouame	Ivory Coast	10.82	
49	3	Justine Isaboke	Kenya	10.85	
49	5	Jerome Kounou	Benin	10.85	
51	9	Ojulu Kul	Ethiopia	10.86	
52	7	Sharry Dodin	Seychelles	10.88	
53	2	Didier Kiki	Benin	10.90	
54	5	Kossi Médard Nayo	Togo	10.91	
55	1	Gregor Appols	Namibia	10.94	
56	6	Caleb Adonai	Central African Republic	10.97	
57	2	Ronaldinho Oliveira	Cape Verde	11.03	
57	3	Janosh Moncerry	Seychelles	11.03	
59	6	Ludovic Kilambaye	Chad	11.47	
60	1	Ahmed Musa	Ethiopia	11.57	
61	9	Gregorio Ndong Oye	Equatorial Guinea	12.11	
62	3	Ahmed Essabai	Libya	12.29	
63	8	Joshan Vencatasamy	Mauritius	17.33	
	4	Herve Toumandji	Central African Republic	DNS	
	5	Fidel Lawrence	Sierra Leone	DNS	
	7	Foday Kallon	Sierra Leone	DNS	
	9	Ambdoul Karim Riffayn	Comoros	DNS	
	9	William Aguessy	Benin	DNS	

=== Semi-finals ===
Held on 22 June. First 2 of each semifinal (Q) and the next 2 fastest (q) qualified for the final.

Wind:
Heat 1: +0.1 m/s, Heat 2: 0.0 m/s, Heat 3: +1.1 m/s

Rank	Heat	Name	Nationality	Time	Notes
1	1	Ismael Koné	Ivory Coast	10.03	Q
2	2	Tapiwanashe Makarawu	Zimbabwe	10.06	Q
3	1	Kayinsola Ajayi	Nigeria	10.08	Q
3	2	Benjamin Richardson	South Africa	10.08	Q
5	1	Noah Bibi	Mauritius	10.17	q
5	3	Joseph Fahnbulleh	Liberia	10.17	Q
7	2	Emmanuel Eseme	Cameroon	10.18	q
8	3	Isaac Botsio	Ghana	10.25	Q
9	3	Bayanda Walaza	South Africa	10.26	
10	1	Raphael Ngaguele Mberlina	Cameroon	10.27	
11	2	Usheoritse Itsekiri	Nigeria	10.29	
12	1	Bradley Nkoana	South Africa	10.30	
12	3	Mamadou Fall Sarr	Senegal	10.30	
14	1	Adama Jammeh	Gambia	10.31	
14	1	Edwin Gadayi	Ghana	10.31	
16	2	Ebrahima Camara	Gambia	10.34	
17	2	Mojela Koneshe	Lesotho	10.42	
17	3	Mark Odhiambo	Kenya	10.42	
19	2	Olivier Mwimba	Democratic Republic of the Congo	10.51	
20	3	Alieu Joof	Gambia	10.55	
21	1	Stephen Abosi	Botswana	10.61	
22	2	Sibusiso Matsenjwa	Eswatini	10.66	
23	3	Ibrahim Diomande	Ivory Coast	10.92	
	3	Letsile Tebogo	Botswana	DNS	

=== Final ===
Held on 22 June

Wind: 0.0 m/s

Rank	Lane	Athlete	Nationality	Time	Notes
1st place, gold medalist(s)	6	Joseph Fahnbulleh	Liberia	10.13	
2nd place, silver medalist(s)	1	Emmanuel Eseme	Cameroon	10.15	
3rd place, bronze medalist(s)	8	Benjamin Richardson	South Africa	10.17	
4	3	Kayinsola Ajayi	Nigeria	10.20	
5	4	Ismael Koné	Ivory Coast	10.24	
6	5	Tapiwa Makarawu	Zimbabwe	10.25	
7	7	Isaac Botsio	Ghana	10.33	
8	2	Noah Bibi	Mauritius	10.43	

== See also ==
- Athletics at the 2023 African Games – Men's 100 metres
