= Athletics at the 2023 Jeux de la Francophonie =

Athletics at the 9th Jeux de la Francophonie
- Dates: 31 July – 4 August 2023
- Host city: (Democratic Republic of the Congo) Kinshasa, DR Congo
- Venue: Stade des Martyrs
- Events: 43 + 10 para-athletics
- Participation: 303 athletes from 26 nations

The athletics competition at the 2023 Jeux de la Francophonie took place in Stade des Martyrs in Kinshasa from 31 July to 4 August 2023.

== Medal table ==
* Host nation (DR Congo)

| Rank | Nation | Gold | Silver | Bronze | Total |
|---|---|---|---|---|---|
| 1 | Morocco (MAR) | 17 | 14 | 11 | 42 |
| 2 | Romania (ROU) | 6 | 3 | 6 | 15 |
| 3 | Cameroon (CMR) | 5 | 8 | 3 | 16 |
| 4 | Mauritius (MRI) | 4 | 3 | 2 | 9 |
| 5 | Ivory Coast (CIV) | 4 | 2 | 1 | 7 |
| 6 | Djibouti (DJI) | 4 | 1 | 3 | 8 |
| 7 | Burkina Faso (BUR) | 4 | 1 | 2 | 7 |
| 8 | Senegal (SEN) | 3 | 5 | 0 | 8 |
| 9 | Niger (NIG) | 1 | 4 | 2 | 7 |
| 10 | Chad (CHA) | 1 | 2 | 1 | 4 |
| 11 | Switzerland (SUI) | 1 | 1 | 2 | 4 |
| 12 | Lebanon (LIB) | 1 | 0 | 1 | 2 |
| 13 | Guinea (GUI) | 1 | 0 | 0 | 1 |
| 13 | Madagascar (MAD) | 1 | 0 | 0 | 1 |
| 15 | DR Congo (COD)* | 0 | 3 | 8 | 11 |
| 16 | Congo (CGO) | 0 | 3 | 3 | 6 |
| 17 | Kosovo (KOS) | 0 | 2 | 0 | 2 |
| 18 | Mali (MLI) | 0 | 1 | 2 | 3 |
| 19 | Armenia (ARM) | 0 | 0 | 1 | 1 |
| 19 | Benin (BEN) | 0 | 0 | 1 | 1 |
| 19 | Burundi (BDI) | 0 | 0 | 1 | 1 |
| 19 | Equatorial Guinea (GEQ) | 0 | 0 | 1 | 1 |
| 19 | Gabon (GAB) | 0 | 0 | 1 | 1 |
| Totals (23 entries) | | 53 | 53 | 52 | 158 |

== Medal summary ==
=== Men ===
| Event | Gold | | Silver | | Bronze | |
|---|---|---|---|---|---|---|
| 100 m (wind: +0.9 m/s) | Emmanuel Eseme; Cameroon | 10.04 | Mamadou Fall Sarr; Senegal | 10.17 =NR | Arthur Cissé; Ivory Coast | 10.24 |
| 200 m (wind: -0.3 m/s) | Cheickna Traore; Ivory Coast | 20.37 | Fodé Sissoko; Mali | 20.62 | Guy Maganga Gorra; Gabon | 20.64 |
| 400 m | Cheikh Tidiane Diouf; Senegal | 45.78 | Hamza Dair; Morocco | 46.07 | Rachid Mhamdi; Morocco | 46.26 |
| 800 m | Oussama El Bouchayby; Morocco | 1:47.74 | Mostafa Smaili; Morocco | 1:47.76 | Nabil Oussama; Morocco | 1:48.18 |
| 1500 m | Hicham Akankam; Morocco | 3:41.08 | Hafid Rizky; Morocco | 3:41.89 | Abdo-Razak Hassan; Djibouti | 3:42.08 |
| 5000 m | Mohamed Ismail Ibrahim; Djibouti | 13:22.44 | Hicham Akankam; Morocco | 13:29.86 | Emilie Hafashimana; Burundi | 13:31.11 |
| 10,000 m | Moumin Bouh Guelleh; Djibouti | 28:47.15 | Djamal Abdi Dirieh; Djibouti | 28:50.31 | Mouhcine Outalha; Morocco | 28:55.48 |
| 110 m hurdles (wind: +0.7 m/s) | Louis François Mendy; Senegal | 13.38 GR | Saguirou Badamassi; Niger | 13.67 | Richard Diawara; Mali | 13.69 |
| 400 m hurdles | Saad Hinti; Morocco | 49.32 | Ousmane Sidibé; Senegal | 49.58 | Bienvenu Sawadogo; Burkina Faso | 50.34 |
| 3000 m steeplechase | Mohamed Ismail Ibrahim; Djibouti | 8:55.36 | Mohammed Tindoufti; Morocco | 8:55.37 | Salaheddine Ben Yazide; Morocco | 9:03.86 |
| 4 × 100 m relay | Ivory Coast; Gnamien Nehemie N'goran; Ibrahim Diomande; Cheickna Traore; Arthur Cissé | 39.32 | Senegal; Lamine Diallo; Mamadou Fall Sarr; Omar Ndoye; Louis François Mendy | 39.66 | Mauritius; Orphee Topize; Jonathan Bardotier; Noah Bibi; Joshan Vencatasamy | 39.71 |
| 4 × 400 m relay | Morocco; Rachid Mhamdi; Aymane El Haddaoui; Saad Hinti; Hamza Dair | 3:03.44 | Senegal; Frederick Mendy; Ousmane Sidibé; Lamine Diallo; Cheikh Tidiane Diouf | 3:03.66 | Lebanon; Noureddine Hadid; Marc Anthony Ibrahim; Ali Mourtada; Mohamad Mortada | 3:11.74 NR |
| Half marathon | Moumin Bouh Guelleh; Djibouti | 1:02:48 GR | Mouhcine Outalha; Morocco | 1:03:00 | Djamal Abdi Dirieh; Djibouti | 1:03:32 |
| 20 km race walk | Ionuț Vasilică Pleșu; Romania | 1:39:11 | Sand Endry Muteb; DR Congo | 1:53:52 | Kazadi Alain Mbayo; DR Congo | 2:24:45 |
| High jump | Joseph Dezardin Prosper; Mauritius | 2.15 m | Fredy Kevin Oyono; Cameroon | 2.05 m | Daniel Nsue; Equatorial Guinea | 2.00 m |
| Long jump | Appolinaire Yimra; Cameroon | 7.99 m | Fredy Kevin Oyono; Cameroon | 7.84 m | Raymond Nkwemy Tchomfa; Cameroon | 7.83 m |
| Triple jump | Hugues Fabrice Zango; Burkina Faso | 17.11 m | Amath Faye; Senegal | 16.61 m | Levon Aghasyan; Armenia | 16.40 m |
| Shot put | Marius Constantin Musteață; Romania | 19.56 m | Muhamet Ramadani; Kosovo | 18.36 m | Bernard Baptiste; Mauritius | 18.02 m |
| Discus throw | Alin Alexandru Firfirica; Romania | 64.39 m | Christopher Sophie; Mauritius | 59.78 m NR | Marius Constan Musteata; Romania | 51.25 m |
| Hammer throw | Jean Ian Carre; Mauritius | 52.50 m | Romeo Manzila Mahambou; Congo | 30.76 m | Nyandwe Gedeon Kalonda; DR Congo | 28.18 m |
| Javelin throw | Alexandru Novac; Romania | 84.75 m GR | Denis Adrian Both; Romania | 71.89 m | Prince Yannick Kibaya; Congo | 65.86 m |
| Decathlon | Daniel Malach; Switzerland | 7369 pts | Nino Portmann; Switzerland | 7329 pts | Joel Tshikamba; DR Congo | 5576 pts |

=== Women ===
| Event | Gold | | Silver | | Bronze | |
|---|---|---|---|---|---|---|
| 100 m (wind: -1.0 m/s) | Maboundou Koné; Ivory Coast | 11.24 | Jessika Gbai; Ivory Coast | 11.38 | Natacha Ngoye Akamabi; Congo | 11.44 |
| 200 m (wind: -0.7 m/s) | Jessika Gbai; Ivory Coast | 22.43 GR | Maboundou Koné; Ivory Coast | 22.53 | Sara El Hachimi; Morocco | 23.22 NR |
| 400 m | Sara El Hachimi; Morocco | 52.62 | Sita Sibiri; Burkina Faso | 53.13 NR | Samira Awal; Niger | 53.39 |
| 800 m | Assia Raziki; Morocco | 2:09.45 | Soukaina Hajji; Morocco | 2:09.67 | Cristina Daniela Balan; Romania | 2:10.28 |
| 1500 m | Wafa Zaroual; Morocco | 4:44.55 | Soukaina Hajji; Morocco | 4:44.98 | Rababe Arafi; Morocco | 4:45.42 |
| 5000 m | Rahma Tahiri; Morocco | 15:56.71 GR | Kaoutar Farkoussi; Morocco | 15:57.91 | Soukaina Atanane; Morocco | 16:05.34 |
| 10,000 m | Soukaina Atanane; Morocco | 33:01.25 | Kaoutar Farkoussi; Morocco | 33:11.67 | Samia Hassan Nour; Djibouti | 33:21.50 |
| 100 m hurdles (wind: +0.7 m/s) | Sidonie Fiadanantsoa; Madagascar | 13.01 | Anamaria Nesteriuc; Romania | 13.20 | Larissa Bertényi; Switzerland | 13.58 |
| 400 m hurdles | Noura Ennadi; Morocco | 55.17 | Linda Angounou; Cameroon | 56.68 | Sita Sibiri; Burkina Faso | 58.04 |
| 3000 m steeplechase | Ikram Ouaaziz; Morocco | 9:52.74 | Gresa Bakraqi; Kosovo | 10:48.25 | Nzabava Clarisse Asifiwe; DR Congo | 12:11.53 NR |
| 4 × 100 m relay | Cameroon; Stéphanie Njuh Nstella; Linda Angounou; Irène Bell Bonong; Herverge Kole Etame | 44.78 | Republic of the Congo; Marcelle Bouele Bondo; Elodie Malessara; Patrone Kouvoutoukila; Natacha Ngoye Akamabi | 45.49 NR | Romania; Cristina Daniela Balan; Maria Bisericescu; Anamaria Nesteriuc; Marina Andreea Baboi | 45.56 |
| 4 × 400 m relay | Morocco; Salma Lehlali; Assia Raziki; Sara El Hachimi; Noura Ennadi | 3:33.89 NR | Cameroon; Irène Bell Bonong; Adèle Mafogang; Herverge Kole Etame; Linda Angounou | 3:40.84 | Romania; Marina Andreea Baboi; Lenuta Simiuc; Anamaria Nesteriuc; Cristina Daniela Balan | 3:45.57 |
| Half marathon | Rahma Tahiri; Morocco | 1:13:23 GR | Hanane Qallouj; Morocco | 1:13:46 | Selina Ummel; Switzerland | 1:17:08 |
| 20 km race walk | Mihaela Popa; Romania | 1:47:36 | Beatrice Hamidou Tayki'oo; Cameroon | 1:54:35 NR | Gracia Ladisa; DR Congo | 2:04:54 NR |
| High jump | Fatoumata Balley; Guinea | 1.76 m | Federica Gabriela Apostol; Romania | 1.73 m | Ghizlane Siba; Morocco | 1.73 m |
| Long jump | Marthe Koala; Burkina Faso | 6.94 m GR, NR | Yousra Lajdoud; Morocco | 6.55 m NR | Véronique Kossenda Rey; Cameroon | 6.42 m |
| Triple jump | Saly Sarr; Senegal | 14.00 m | Véronique Kossenda Rey; Cameroon | 13.97 m | Diana Ana Maria Ion; Romania | 13.94 m |
| Shot put | Frédéric Lemongo Nkoulou; Cameroon | 14.99 m | Nora Monie; Cameroon | 14.74 m | Nassira Koné; Mali | 12.26 m |
| Discus throw | Nora Monie; Cameroon | 57.81 m | Yelena Mokoka; DR Congo | 53.85 m NR | Andreea Iuliana Lungu; Romania | 51.01 m |
| Hammer throw | Bianca Ghelber; Romania | 73.20 m | Juliane Clair; Mauritius | 53.45 m | Exaucee Koussalouka; Congo | 45.81 m |
| Javelin throw | Jessica Rosun; Mauritius | 47.91 m | Vanessa Colin; Mauritius | 45.38 m | Rosie Mulambavu; DR Congo | 39.10 m |

=== Para-athletics ===
| Event | Class | Gold | | Silver | | Bronze | |
|---|---|---|---|---|---|---|---|
| Men's 200 m | T45–47 | Ayoub Sadni; Morocco | 21.71 | Ibrahim Dayabou Abdou; Niger | 23.15 | Fayssal Atchiba; Benin | 23.31 |
| Men's 200 m | T42–44 & T61–64 | Arz Zahreddine; Lebanon | 25.02 | Succès Rimoyal; Chad | 28.85 | Victor Allere; Chad | 29.70 |
| Men's long jump | T42–47 & F61–62 | Souley Soumaila Oumarou; Niger | 6.45 m | Bouba Ibrahim; Cameroon | 6.44 m | Abdelkbir Jaddi; Morocco | 6.30 m |
| Men's javelin throw | F42–46 & F61–64 | Zakarie Ez Zouhri; Morocco | 57.92 m | Gregoir Shukuru Mikekemo; DR Congo | 26.69 m | Loic Wandji Ngono; Cameroon | 28.70 m |
| Women's 100 m | T11–12 | Julie Anndora Asaun; Mauritius | 13.45 | Guerlin Mpemissi Moukari; Congo | 16.26 | Rachel Mwamini Bahezire; DR Congo | 18.34 |
| Women's long jump | T11–12 | Fran Nékingam Djérambété; Chad | 3.09 m | Sadjangar Moudjimadji; Chad | 2.37 m | not awarded | |
| Women's 100 m | T13 | Rahinatou Moné; Burkina Faso | 14.04 | Saadatou Mahamadou Chanson; Niger | 16.04 | Zeimabar Alimoutari; Niger | 16.38 |
| Women's long jump | T13 | Rahinatou Moné; Burkina Faso | 3.96 m | Saadatou Mahamadou Chanson; Niger | 3.67 m | Bulenda Shimirayi; DR Congo | 3.49 m |
| Women shot put | F40–41 | Youssra Karim; Morocco | 8.90 m | Hayat El Garaa; Morocco | 8.07 m | Ibtissam El Garaa; Morocco | 7.08 m |
| Women discus throw | F40–41 | Youssra Karim; Morocco | 35.65 m | Hayat El Garaa; Morocco | 29.78 m | Ibtissam El Garaa; Morocco | 26.47 m |

== Participating nations ==
According to an unofficial count 303 athletes from 26 nations participated (not including athletes in disability events).

- Armenia (7)
- Benin (10)
- Burkina Faso (8)
- Burundi (8)
- Cameroon (23)
- Democratic Republic of the Congo (61)
- Djibouti (9)
- Equatorial Guinea (10)
- Gabon (4)
- Guinea (3)
- Ivory Coast (8)
- Kosovo (2)
- Lebanon (5)
- Madagascar (6)
- Mali (6)
- Mauritius (15)
- Morocco (34)
- Niger (6)
- Republic of the Congo (19)
- Romania (21)
- Senegal (12)
- Seychelles (5)
- Switzerland (10)
- Togo (6)
- Tunisia (2)
- United Arab Emirates (3)
