= 2026 African Championships in Athletics – Women's 200 metres =

Women's 200 metres at the 2026 African Championships in Athletics
- Venue: Legon Sports Stadium
- Location: Accra, Ghana
- Dates: 15–16 May
- Competitors: 47 from 31 nations
- Winning time: 23.36

Medalists
gold medal	Maboundou Koné	Ivory Coast
silver medal	Rosemary Chukwuma	Nigeria
bronze medal	Symone Darius	Liberia

The women's 200 metres event at the 2026 African Championships in Athletics was held on 15 and 16 May in Accra, Ghana.

== Results ==
=== Heats ===
Held on 12 May. First 2 of each heat (Q) and the next 8 fastest (q) qualified for the semifinals.
Wind:
Heat 1: -2.4 m/s, Heat 2: -3.1 m/s, Heat 3: -1.2 m/s, Heat 4: -2.4 m/s, Heat 5: -2.8 m/s, Heat 6: -2.4 m/s, Heat 7: -3.5 m/s, Heat 8: -2.3 m/s

Rank	Heat	Athlete	Nationality	Time	Notes
1	3	Nyimasata Jawneh	Gambia	23.61	Q
2	4	Maboundou Koné	Ivory Coast	23.67	Q
3	7	Rosemary Chukwuma	Nigeria	23.70	Q
4	3	Kayla La Grange	South Africa	23.86	Q
4	7	Symone Darius	Liberia	23.86	Q
6	8	Chigozie Rosemary Nwankwo	Nigeria	23.96	Q
7	8	Maram Mahmoud Ahmed	Egypt	24.07	Q
8	4	Isatou Sey	Gambia	24.18	Q
9	6	Niddy Mingilishi	Zambia	24.21	Q
10	5	Gorete Semedo	São Tomé and Príncipe	24.22	Q
11	5	Aude Bogui	Cape Verde	24.23	Q
12	5	Joviale Mbisha	South Africa	24.23	q
13	2	Milcent Ndoro	Kenya	24.26	Q
14	7	Ajayeba Aliye	Ethiopia	24.35	q
15	8	Edna Ngandula	Zambia	24.38	q
16	2	Janet Mensah	Ghana	24.41	Q
17	6	Asimenye Simwaka	Malawi	24.47	Q
18	6	Magnifique Umutesiwase	Rwanda	24.47	q
19	6	Karabo Mantswinyane	Botswana	24.48	q
20	2	Lucia Moris	South Sudan	24.49	q
21	7	Aishatu Jaffar	Ghana	24.51	q
22	5	Saly Safietou Faboure	Senegal	24.54	q
23	7	Elodie Malessara	Republic of the Congo	24.58	
24	3	Destiny Smith-Barnett	Liberia	24.61	
25	6	Dawa Ange Ella Klah	Ivory Coast	24.70	
26	3	Winfrida Makenji	Tanzania	24.77	
27	2	Jade Nangula	Namibia	24.78	
28	1	Maimouna Badji	Senegal	24.85	Q
28	4	Bineta Sall	Senegal	24.85	
30	2	Samukeliso Ndebele	Zimbabwe	24.86	
31	1	Gladys Boateng	Ghana	24.88	Q
32	1	Lillian Owako	Kenya	24.92	
33	4	Monica Akullu	Uganda	24.93	
34	5	Marie Lydia Oceanne Moirt	Mauritius	24.97	
35	4	Angelique Abberley	Mauritius	24.98	
36	3	Madjo Doumbia	Mali	25.00	
37	8	Bongiwe Mahlalela	Eswatini	25.09	
38	2	Salamatou Halidou Hassane	Niger	25.21	
39	8	Elos Devine Kandomba	Democratic Republic of the Congo	25.57	
40	7	Ruth Mutale	Zambia	25.60	
41	5	Goodness Ayi	Benin	25.62	
42	4	Elsiane Adjinda	Benin	25.95	
43	4	Luciana Lopes	Cape Verde	26.09	
44	1	Silvanilda Gomes	Cape Verde	26.10	
45	1	Alba Mbo Nchama	Equatorial Guinea	26.62	
46	6	Eugenie Sandy	Guinea	27.44	
47	1	Esther Mayadjim Mingueyam	Chad	29.93	
	1	Ndawana Haitembu	Namibia	DNS	
	2	Emmy Hosea Saulo	Tanzania	DNS	
	2	Jennifer Obi Chukwuma	Nigeria	DNS	
	3	Selamawit Kokeb	Ethiopia	DNS	
	3	Katlego Kaisara	Botswana	DNS	
	4	Claudine Njarasoa	Madagascar	DNS	
	5	Lone Madzimule	Botswana	DNS	
	5	Herverge Kole Etame	Cameroon	DNS	
	6	Amélie Anthony	Mauritius	DNS	
	8	Natacha Ngoye	Republic of the Congo	DNS	
	8	Eunice Kadogo	Kenya	DNS	

=== Semifinals ===
Held 12 May. First 2 of each semifinal (Q) and the next 2 fastest (q) qualified for the final.
Wind:
Heat 1: -1.5 m/s, Heat 2: -1.5 m/s, Heat 3: -2.4 m/s

Rank	Heat	Athlete	Nationality	Time	Notes
1	1	Rosemary Chukwuma	Nigeria	23.24	Q
2	2	Maboundou Koné	Ivory Coast	23.26	Q
3	3	Nyimasata Jawneh	Gambia	23.58	Q
4	2	Maram Mahmoud Ahmed	Egypt	23.61	Q
5	3	Symone Darius	Liberia	23.67	Q
6	2	Niddy Mingilishi	Zambia	23.74	q
7	2	Joviale Mbisha	South Africa	23.98	q
8	2	Karabo Mantswinyane	Botswana	24.00	
9	1	Isatou Sey	Gambia	24.15	Q
10	3	Chigozie Rosemary Nwankwo	Nigeria	24.16	
11	1	Aishatu Jaffar	Ghana	24.19	
12	1	Gorete Semedo	São Tomé and Príncipe	24.24	
13	1	Aude Bogui	Cape Verde	24.25	
13	3	Lucia Moris	South Sudan	24.25	
15	2	Janet Mensah	Ghana	24.26	
16	1	Ajayeba Aliye	Ethiopia	24.34	
17	1	Milcent Ndoro	Kenya	24.39	
18	3	Magnifique Umutesiwase	Rwanda	24.50	
19	3	Kayla La Grange	South Africa	24.54	
20	1	Saly Safietou Faboure	Senegal	24.55	
21	2	Maimouna Badji	Senegal	24.61	
22	3	Asimenye Simwaka	Malawi	24.85	
23	3	Gladys Boateng	Ghana	25.46	
	2	Edna Ngandula	Zambia	DNS	

=== Final ===
Held on 13 May
Wind: NWI

Rank	Heat	Athlete	Nationality	Time	Notes
1st place, gold medalist(s)	6	Maboundou Koné	Ivory Coast	23.36	
2nd place, silver medalist(s)	5	Rosemary Chukwuma	Nigeria	23.60	23.590
3rd place, bronze medalist(s)	4	Symone Darius	Liberia	23.60	23.592
4	7	Nyimasata Jawneh	Gambia	23.68	
5	3	Maram Mahmoud Ahmed	Egypt	24.06	
6	1	Joviale Mbisha	South Africa	24.32	
7	2	Niddy Mingilishi	Zambia	24.34	
	8	Isatou Sey	Gambia	DQ	
