= Jamal Abdi Dirieh =

Djiboutian long-distance runner

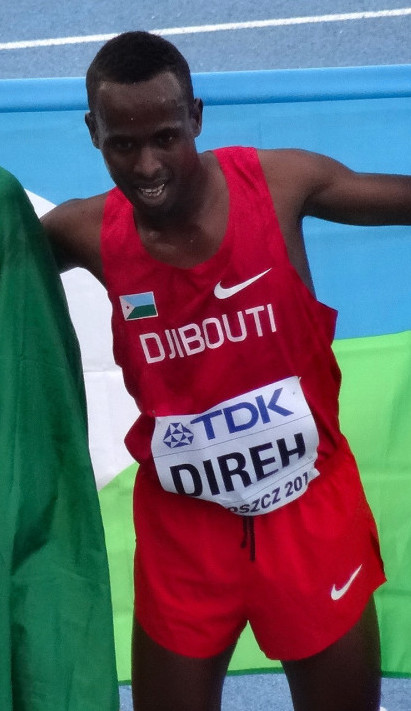
- Dirieh in 2016

Personal information
- Born: 1997 (age 28–29)

Sport
- Sport: Athletics
- Event(s): 5000 m, 10,000 m

Jamal Abdi Dirieh (Somali: Jamal Cabdi Diiriye; orn 1997) is a Djiboutian long-distance runner. He represented his country in the 5000 metres at the 2017 World Championships narrowly missing the final. In addition, he won a silver medal at the 2016 World U20 Championships.

== International competitions ==
| Year | Competition | Venue | Position | Event | Notes |
Representing Djibouti
| 2014 | African Championships | Marrakesh, Morocco | 12th | 5000 m | 14:15.78 |
| 2016 | World U20 Championships | Bydgoszcz, Poland | 2nd | 5000 m | 13:21.50 |
| 2017 | World Championships | London, United Kingdom | 12th (h) | 5000 m | 13:28.98 |
| 2022 | African Championships | Port Louis, Mauritius | 20th (h) | 1500 m | 3:55.72 |
| 2022 | African Championships | Port Louis, Mauritius | 9th | 10,000 m | 29:42.69 |
| 2023 | Jeux de la Francophonie | Kinshasa, DR Congo | 2nd | 10,000 m | 28:50.31 |
| 2023 | Jeux de la Francophonie | Kinshasa, DR Congo | 3rd | Half marathon | 1:03:32 |

== Personal bests ==
Outdoor

- 5000 metres – 13:13.45 (Heusden-Zolder 2017)
- 10,000 metres – 30:07.47 (Tlemcen 2016)
