= Soukaina Atanane =

Moroccan long-distance runner

Personal information
- Born: 28 June 1994 (age 31)

Sport
- Sport: Track and field

Achievements and titles
- Personal best(s): 5000 m: 15:18.78 (2024); 10,000 m: 32:37.42 (2023); 10 km road: 31:20 (2026); Half marathon: 1:09:19 (2024); Marathon: 2:24:57 (2024)

Soukaina Atanane (born 28 June 1994) is a Moroccan long-distance runner.

== Career ==
Competing in the 5000 metres, she won the silver medal at the 2017 Arab Championships, gold at the 2017 Jeux de la Francophonie, finished fifth at the 2018 Mediterranean Games, and won the bronze medal at the 2023 Jeux de la Francophonie. She won the 10,000 metres gold medal at both the 2023 Jeux de la Francophonie and the 2023 Arab Championships.

She won the silver medal in both 5000 and 10,000 at the 2023 Arab Games and took her first Moroccan championship titles in the 5000 metres in 2024 and 2025.

Off the track she finished ninth at the 2023 Arab Cross Country Championships, and had several top-6 finishes at half marathons and marathon races: fifth at the 2019 Semi Marathon International de Marrakech, sixth at the 2019 Tallinn Half Marathon, sixth at the 2019 Guadalajara Marathon, second at the 2021 Dhaka Half Marathon, first at the 2022 Dhaka Half Marathon, sixth at the 2022 Semi Marathon International de Marrakech, first at the 2022 Tallinn Half Marathon, first at the 2023 Athens Classic Marathon, fifth at the 2024 Roma–Ostia Half Marathon, first at the 2024 Rabat Half Marathon and third at the 2025 Rabat Marathon.
