= Mouhcine Outalha =

Moroccan long-distance runner

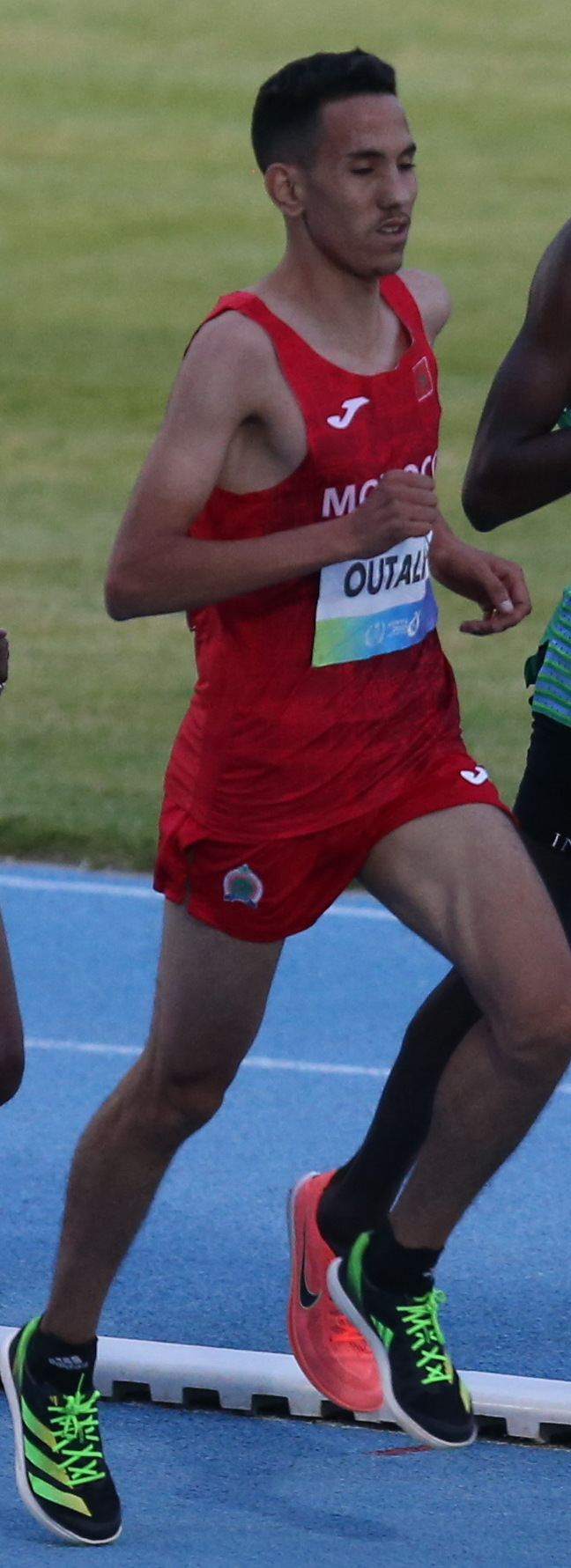
- Mouhcine Outalha in 2022

Personal information
- Born: 15 December 1998 (age 27)

Sport
- Country: Morocco
- Sport: Athletics
- Event: Long-distance running

Achievements and titles
- Personal bests: 1500 m: 3:44.04 (Rabat 2021); 3000 m: 7:51.55 (Rabat 2018); 5000 m: 13:27.04 (Carquefou 2019); 10,000 m: 28:32.50 (Rabat 2022); Half marathon: 1:00:26 (Gdynia 2020); Marathon: 2:06:49 (Doha 2023)
Medal record
Athletics
Representing Morocco
Mediterranean Games
Gold medal – first place	2022 Oran	Half marathon

Mouhcine Outalha (born 15 December 1998) is a Moroccan long-distance runner. He competed in the men's race at the 2020 World Athletics Half Marathon Championships held in Gdynia, Poland.

== Career ==
He competed in the junior men's race at the 2017 IAAF World Cross Country Championships held in Kampala, Uganda.

In 2019, he represented Morocco at the African Games held in Rabat, Morocco. He competed in the men's 5000 metres and he finished in 13th place.

== Achievements ==
Year	Competition	Venue	Position	Event	Notes
Representing Morocco
2019	African Games	Rabat, Morocco	13th	5000 m	13:51.28
2020	World Half Marathon Championships	Gdynia, Poland	15th	Half marathon	1:00:26
2021	Arab Championships	Radès, Tunisia	4th	5000 m	13:50.43
2021	Arab Championships	Radès, Tunisia	1st	10,000 m	29:48
2022	Islamic Solidarity Games	Konya, Turkey	7th	10,000 m	29:34.20
2023	Arab Championships	Marrakesh, Morocco	2nd	Half marathon	1:06:34
2023	Arab Games	Oran, Algeria	2nd	10,000 m	29:17.40
2023	Jeux de la Francophonie	Kinshasa, DR Congo	3rd	10,000 m	28:55.48
2023	Jeux de la Francophonie	Kinshasa, DR Congo	2nd	Half marathon	1:03:00
