= Mumin Gala =

Djiboutian runner (born 1986)

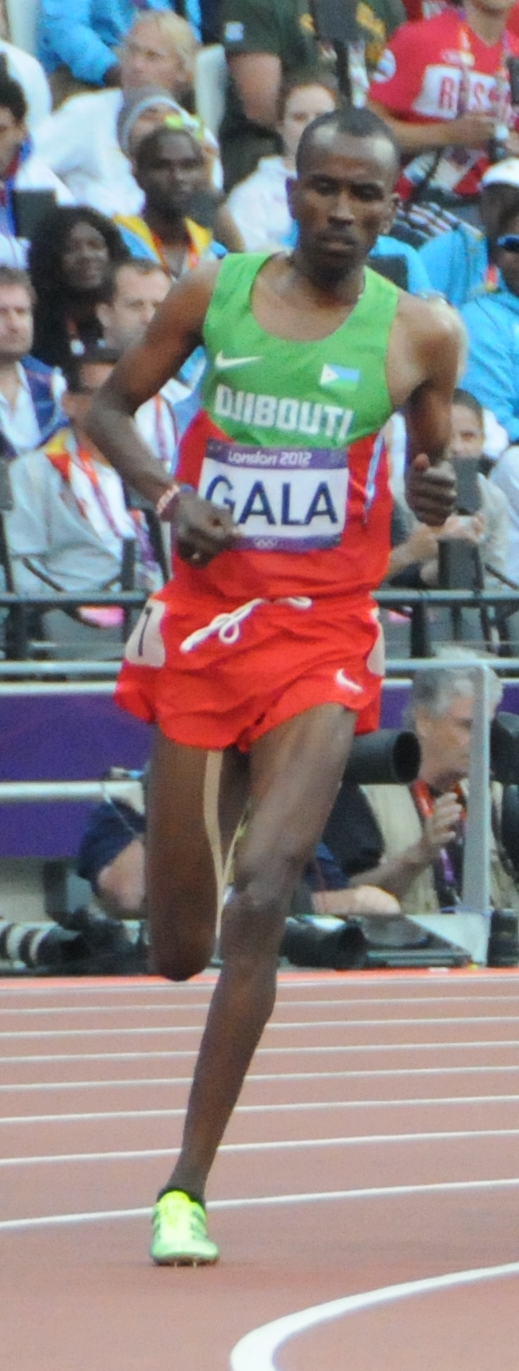
- Gala at the 2012 Olympic Games

Personal information
- Born: Moumin Guelleh; 6 September 1986 (age 39) Djibouti City, Djibouti

Sport
- Country: Djibouti
- Sport: long-distance runner
- Event: 5000 metres
Medal record
Men's athletics
Representing Djibouti
Pan Arab Games
Silver medal – second place	2011 Doha	10,000 m

Mumin Booqora Gala or Moumin Guelleh (Somali: Muumin Geele; born 6 September 1986) is a Djiboutian runner. He competed at the 2012 Summer Olympics in the 5000m event and placed thirteenth.

== Running career ==
In 2011, he took 7th place in the 5000 meters race during the All-Africa Games in Maputo, Mozambique. He was the 10000 m silver medalist at the 2011 Pan Arab Games in Doha. His personal best in the 5000 meters is 13 min 17 s 77 set in Birmingham, United Kingdom in 2011.

In 2012, he competed in the 5000 meters at the Olympic Games in London. Djibouti's National Olympic Committee (NOC), Comité National Olympique Djiboutien, selects athletes that meet the qualification standards. An NOC can to enter up to three qualified athletes in each individual event as long as each athlete met the "A" standard, or one athlete per event if they met the "B" standard. Mumin qualified via the A standard. Gala finished the first heat with a time of 13:21.21, finishing 10th in his heat. Although the first five from each heat move on to the finals, the next five fastest times are also qualified, and Gala was fifth on that list. Gala was close to his personal record of 13:17.77 in the first heat, but he finished the final with a time of 13:50.26 and placed 13th overall, out of a field of 43 athletes.

His 10000 m best is 28:23.46 set at the Blankers-Koen Stadium in Hengelo in 2012.

Gala continued competing at the Olympics by participating in the 2016 Summer Olympics in Rio. He set his personal record in the marathon, with a time of 2:13:04. Gala finished in 12th place.

== International competitions ==
Year	Competition	Venue	Position	Event	Notes
Representing Djibouti
2011	World Championships	Daegu, South Korea	21st (h)	5000 m	13:48.19
2011	All-Africa Games	Maputo, Mozambique	7th	5000 m	13:45.28
2011	Pan Arab Games	Doha, Qatar	5th	5000 m	13:50.43
2011	Pan Arab Games	Doha, Qatar	2nd	10,000 m	28:43.32
2012	Olympic Games	London, United Kingdom	13th	5000 m	13:50.26
2013	Arab Championships	Doha, Qatar	3rd	5000 m	14:08.62
2013	Arab Championships	Doha, Qatar	3rd	10,000 m	29:54.20
2013	Jeux de la Francophonie	Nice, France	–	10,000 m	DNF
2014	African Championships	Marrakesh, Morocco	10th	5000 m	14:02.16
2016	Olympic Games	Rio de Janeiro, Brazil	12th	Marathon	2:13:04
2019	African Games	Rabat, Morocco	–	Half marathon	DNF
2022	African Championships	Port Louis, Mauritius	11th	5000 m	14:22.51
2022	African Championships	Port Louis, Mauritius	10th	10,000 m	29:57.43
2022	Islamic Solidarity Games	Konya, Turkey	3rd	10,000 m	28:33.01
2023	Jeux de la Francophonie	Kinshasa, DR Congo	1st	10,000 m	28:47.15
2023	Jeux de la Francophonie	Kinshasa, DR Congo	1st	Half marathon	1:02:48
2024	African Games	Accra, Ghana	9th	Half marathon	1:07:37
