= Maboundou Koné =

Ivorian sprinter (born 1997)

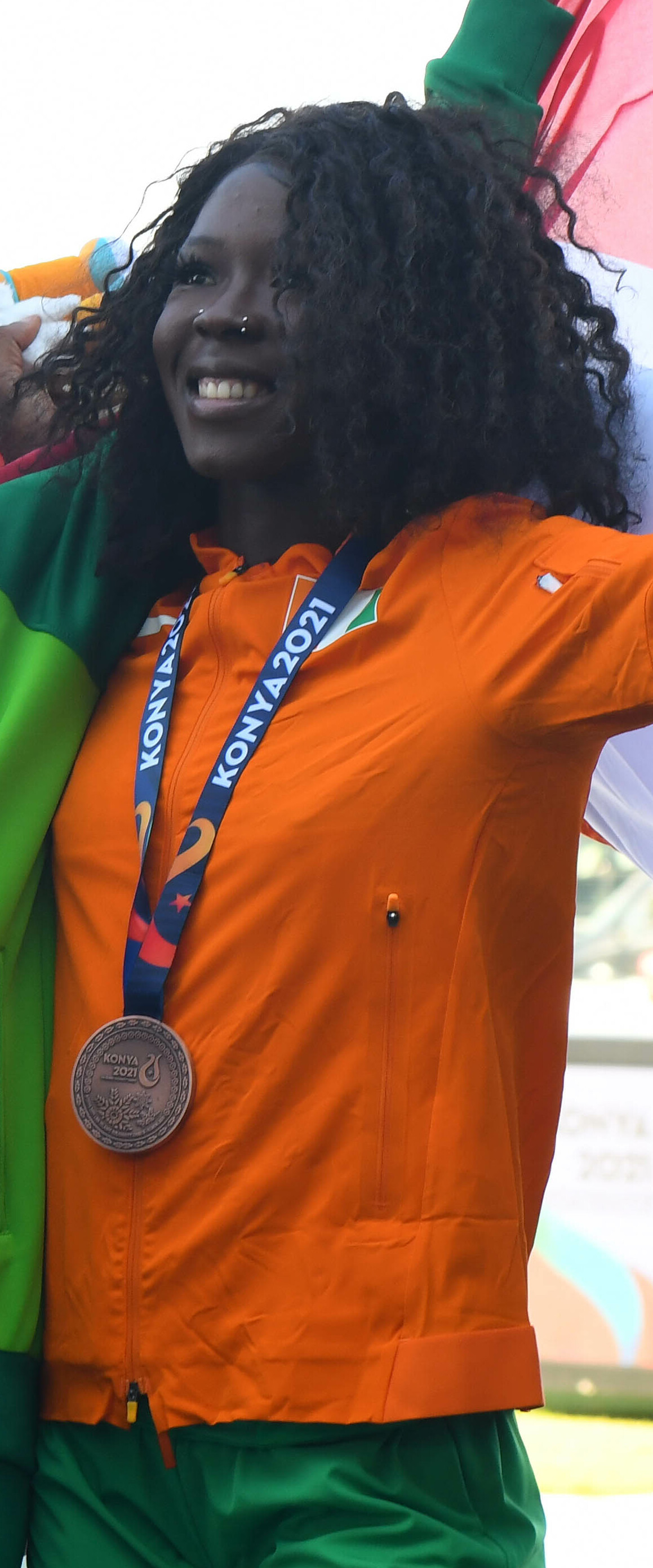

Personal information
- Nationality: Ivory Coast
- Born: 16 May 1997 (age 29)

Sport
- Sport: Athletics
- Event: Sprint

Achievements and titles
- Personal bests: 100 m: 11.09 (Troyes, 2025); 200 m: 22.53 (Kinshasa, 2023)
Medal record
Women's athletics
Representing the Ivory Coast
African Championships
Gold medal – first place	2026 Accra	200 m
Silver medal – second place	2024 Douala	200 m
Bronze medal – third place	2024 Douala	100 m
Islamic Solidarity Games
Bronze medal – third place	2021 Konya	100 m
Bronze medal – third place	2021 Konya	200 m
Jeux de la Francophonie
Gold medal – first place	2023 Kinshasa	100 m
Silver medal – second place	2023 Kinshasa	200 m

Maboundou Koné (born 16 May 1997) is an Ivorian track and field athlete who competes as a sprinter. She ran at the 2024 Olympic Games and won the gold medal over 200 metres at the 2026 African Championships in Athletics.

== Biography ==
She was part of the Ivory Coast 4 × 100 m relay team that ran 42.23 seconds to win the Diamond League meeting in Lausanne.

In August 2023, she set a new personal best time for the 200 meters of 22.53 seconds in Kinshasa.

Selected for the 200 metres at the 2023 World Athletics Championships in Budapest in August 2023, she qualified for the semi-finals.

She ran as part of the Ivory Coast 4 × 100 m relay team, which qualified for the 2024 Paris Olympics at the 2024 World Relays Championships in Nassau, Bahamas in May 2024. She finished second that month to Shericka Jackson in the 200 meters at the 2024 Diamond League event 2024 Meeting International Mohammed VI d'Athlétisme in Rabat. In June 2024, she finished fifth in the 200 m at the 2024 BAUHAUS-galan Diamond League event in Stockholm. In June 2024, she won bronze in the 100 metres at the African Championships in Douala, Cameroon.

She competed at the 2024 Summer Olympics in Paris over 200 metres, reaching the semi-finals. She also competed in the 100 metres race at the Games. She was also a member of her nation's relay team that competed in the 4 × 100 m relay at the Games.

She competed in the 200 metres at the 2025 Shanghai Diamond League event in China on 3 May 2025. She competed at the 2025 World Athletics Relays in China in the Women's 4 × 100 metres relay in May 2025. In June 2025, she lowered her personal best to 11.09 seconds for the 100 metres whilst competing in Troyes, France (+1.6 m/s).

In September 2025, she competed in the 100 metres at the 2025 World Championships in Tokyo, Japan. She also ran in the women's 200 metres at the championships. She also ran in the women's 4 x 100 metres relay at the championships.

In May, Kone won the gold medal in the 200 metres at the 2026 African Championships in Athletics in Accra, Ghana.

== Athletics achievements ==
Information from her World Athletics profile unless otherwise noted.

=== Personal bests ===
Type	Distance	Time (s)	Wind (m/s)	Venue	Date	Notes
Individual events
Indoor	60 metres	7.21	—N/a	Albuquerque, United States	21 January 2023	
Indoor	200 metres sh	22.92	—N/a	Lubbock, United States	28 January 2023	
Outdoor	100 metres	11.09	+1.9	Troyes, France	22 June 2025	
Outdoor	100 metres	11.09	+1.4	Troyes, France	28 June 2026	
Outdoor	150 metres	17.26	-0.9	Milan, Italy	13 April 2024	
Outdoor	200 metres	22.53	-0.7	Kinshasa, Democratic Republic of the Congo	4 August 2023	
Outdoor	300 metres	38.13	—N/a	Trieste, Italy	11 April 2026	
Team events
Outdoor	4 × 100 metres relay	41.90	—N/a	Budapest, Hungary	25 August 2023	AR NR

=== International competitions ===
Representing Ivory Coast
Year	Competition	Venue	Position	Event	Time	Notes
2014	Youth Olympic Games	Nanjing, China	14th	100 m	12.55	
2014	Youth Olympic Games	Nanjing, China	13th (h)	Mixed 8 x 100 m	1:44.55	
2015	African Junior Championships	Addis Ababa, Ethiopia	5th	100 m	12.44	
2015	African Junior Championships	Addis Ababa, Ethiopia	9th (h)	200 m	25.87	
2022	African Championships	Saint Pierre, Mauritius	10th (sf)	100 m	11.53	
2022	African Championships	Saint Pierre, Mauritius	4th	200 m	23.62	
2022	World Championships	Eugene, United States	31st (h)	200 m	23.32	
2022	Islamic Solidarity Games	Konya, Turkey	3rd	100 m	11.13	
2022	Islamic Solidarity Games	Konya, Turkey	3rd	200 m	23.12	
2023	Jeux de la Francophonie	Kinshasa, Democratic Republic of the Congo	1st	100 m	11.24	
2023	Jeux de la Francophonie	Kinshasa, Democratic Republic of the Congo	2nd	200 m	22.53	PB
2023	World Championships	Budapest, Hungary	24th (h)	100 m	11.26	
2023	World Championships	Budapest, Hungary	—	200 m	DQ (sf)	TR17.2.3
2023	World Championships	Budapest, Hungary	—	4 x 100 m	DNF	
2024	World Relays	Nassau, The Bahamas	6th (h)	4 x 100 m	42.83	
2024	African Championships	Douala, Cameroon	3rd	100 m	11.24	
2024	African Championships	Douala, Cameroon	2nd	200 m	22.99	
2024	Olympic Games	Paris, France	23rd (h)	100 m	11.17	=PB
2024	Olympic Games	Paris, France	13th (sf)	200 m	22.65	SB
2024	Olympic Games	Paris, France	—	4 x 100 m	DQ (h)	TR17.2.3
2025	World Indoor Championships	Nanjing, China	26th (h)	60 m	7.33	
2025	World Relays	Guangzhou, China	14th (h)	4 x 100 m	44.85	SB
2025	World Championships	Tokyo, Japan	38th (h)	100 m	11.42	
2025	World Championships	Tokyo, Japan	27th (h)	200 m	23.11	
2025	World Championships	Tokyo, Japan	12th (h)	4 x 100 m	44.64	
2026	African Championships	Accra, Ghana	5th	100 m	11.61	
2026	African Championships	Accra, Ghana	1st	200 m	23.36	

Olympic Games
Preceded by Cheick Sallah Cissé; Marie-Josée Ta Lou	Flagbearer for Ivory Coast; Paris 2024 with Cheick Sallah Cissé	Succeeded by Incumbent
