= 2026 African Championships in Athletics – Women's 100 metres =

Women's 100 metres at the 2026 African Championships in Athletics
- Venue: Legon Sports Stadium
- Location: Accra, Ghana
- Dates: 12–13 May
- Competitors: 47 from 27 nations
- Winning time: 11.49

Medalists
gold medal	Herverge Kole Etame	Cameroon
silver medal	Rosemary Chukwuma	Nigeria
bronze medal	Thelma Davies	Liberia

The women's 100 metres event at the 2026 African Championships in Athletics was held on 12 and 13 May in Accra, Ghana.

== Results ==
=== Heats ===
Held on 12 May. First 3 of each heat (Q) and the next 3 fastest (q) qualified for the semifinals.
Wind: NWI

Rank	Heat	Athlete	Nationality	Time	Notes
1	5	Thelma Davies	Liberia	11.36	Q
2	3	Herverge Kole Etame	Cameroon	11.44	Q
3	2	Rosemary Chukwuma	Nigeria	11.45	Q
4	7	Maboundou Koné	Ivory Coast	11.53	Q
5	6	Miracle Ezechukwu	Nigeria	11.56	Q
6	3	Ndeye-Arame Touré	Senegal	11.64	Q
7	2	Nyimasata Jawneh	Gambia	11.65	Q
8	3	Tejiri Praise Ugoh	Nigeria	11.66	Q
9	4	Destiny Smith-Barnett	Liberia	11.70	Q
10	6	Maram Mahmoud Ahmed	Egypt	11.75	Q
11	1	Lucia Moris	South Sudan	11.77	Q, =NR
12	1	Gorete Semedo	São Tomé and Príncipe	11.84	Q
12	1	Lou Yonan Chantal Djehi	Ivory Coast	11.84	Q
12	5	Joviale Mbisha	South Africa	11.84	Q
15	3	Maimouna Badji	Senegal	11.90	q
16	6	Pierrick-Linda Moulin	Gabon	11.91	Q
17	7	Isatou Sey	Gambia	11.91	Q
18	5	Samukeliso Ndebele	Zimbabwe	11.97	Q
19	5	Aishatu Jaffar	Ghana	11.97	q
20	4	Claudine Njarasoa	Madagascar	11.98	Q
21	3	Asimenye Simwaka	Malawi	11.99	q
22	3	Boitshepiso Kelapile	Botswana	12.00	
23	4	Edna Ngandula	Zambia	12.00	Q
24	3	Eunice Kadogo	Kenya	12.04	
24	7	Saly Safietou Faboure	Senegal	12.04	Q
26	6	Katlego Kaisara	Botswana	12.05	
27	2	Lillian Owako	Kenya	12.09	Q
28	7	Fayza Issaka Abdoukerim	Togo	12.12	
29	5	Amélie Anthony	Mauritius	12.15	
30	2	Madjo Doumbia	Mali	12.19	
31	1	Esther Mbagari	Kenya	12.20	
32	5	Ndawana Haitembu	Namibia	12.25	
33	2	Telile Takele	Ethiopia	12.27	
34	7	Lone Madzimule	Botswana	12.28	
35	6	Jade Nangula	Namibia	12.30	
36	7	Leticia Ohenewaa	Ghana	12.32	
37	4	Marie Lydia Oceanne Moirt	Mauritius	12.43	
38	4	Juliana Djamat-Dubois	Ivory Coast	12.47	
39	6	Selamawit Kokeb	Ethiopia	12.54	
40	1	Elsiane Adjinda	Benin	12.57	
41	2	Hellen Makumba	Zambia	12.60	
42	5	Béatrice Midomide	Benin	12.60	
42	7	Ruth Chanda	Zambia	12.60	
44	4	Bongiwe Mahlalela	Eswatini	12.65	
44	6	Luciana Lopes	Cape Verde	12.65	
46	6	Alba Mbo Nchama	Equatorial Guinea	12.89	
	1	Janet Kwateng Darkoah	Ghana	DNF	
	1	Awa Zongo	Burkina Faso	DNS	
	2	Winfrida Makenji	Tanzania	DNS	
	3	Madjo Doumbia	Mali	DNS	
	4	Emmy Hosea Saulo	Tanzania	DNS	
	4	Fréjushanie Taty Mbikou	Republic of the Congo	DNS	
	5	Natacha Ngoye	Republic of the Congo	DNS	

=== Semifinals ===
Held on 12 May. First 2 of each heat (Q) and the next 2 fastest (q) qualified for the final.
Wind:
Heat 1: -2.0 m/s, Heat 2: -2.0 m/s, Heat 3: -4.0 m/s

Rank	Heat	Athlete	Nationality	Time	Notes
1	2	Miracle Ezechukwu	Nigeria	11.38	Q
2	2	Herverge Kole Etame	Cameroon	11.43	Q
3	1	Thelma Davies	Liberia	11.47	Q
4	1	Destiny Smith-Barnett	Liberia	11.59	Q
5	3	Rosemary Chukwuma	Nigeria	11.63	Q
6	3	Maboundou Koné	Ivory Coast	11.72	Q
7	2	Pierrick-Linda Moulin	Gabon	11.74	q
8	2	Ndeye-Arame Touré	Senegal	11.74	q
9	2	Claudine Njarasoa	Madagascar	11.80	
10	3	Nyimasata Jawneh	Gambia	11.81	
11	1	Isatou Sey	Gambia	11.85	
12	1	Lucia Moris	South Sudan	11.91	
13	1	Joviale Mbisha	South Africa	11.92	
14	2	Gorete Semedo	São Tomé and Príncipe	11.94	
15	3	Maram Mahmoud Ahmed	Egypt	11.98	
16	2	Asimenye Simwaka	Malawi	12.01	
17	1	Aishatu Jaffar	Ghana	12.06	
17	1	Samukeliso Ndebele	Zimbabwe	12.06	
17	3	Tejiri Praise Ugoh	Nigeria	12.06	
20	2	Saly Safietou Faboure	Senegal	12.12	
21	3	Lou Yonan Chantal Djehi	Ivory Coast	12.17	
22	3	Maimouna Badji	Senegal	12.17	
23	3	Lillian Owako	Kenya	12.34	
	1	Edna Ngandula	Zambia	DNS	

=== Final ===
13 May
Wind: -2.8 m/s

Rank	Heat	Athlete	Nationality	Time	Notes
1st place, gold medalist(s)	5	Herverge Kole Etame	Cameroon	11.49	
2nd place, silver medalist(s)	2	Rosemary Chukwuma	Nigeria	11.49	
3rd place, bronze medalist(s)	6	Thelma Davies	Liberia	11.51	
4	4	Miracle Ezechukwu	Nigeria	11.57	
5	7	Maboundou Koné	Ivory Coast	11.61	
6	3	Destiny Smith-Barnett	Liberia	11.63	
7	1	Pierrick-Linda Moulin	Gabon	11.90	
8	8	Ndeye-Arame Touré	Senegal	11.92	
