= Jonathan Bardottier =

Mauritian sprinter (born 1992)

Personal information
- Nationality: Mauritian
- Born: 7 February 1992 (age 33)

Sport
- Sport: Athletics
- Event: Sprinting

Jonathan Bardottier (born 7 February 1992) is a Mauritian athlete. He competed in the men's 100 metres event at the 2019 World Athletics Championships.
