= Rabat Marathon =

Annual race in Morocco since 2015

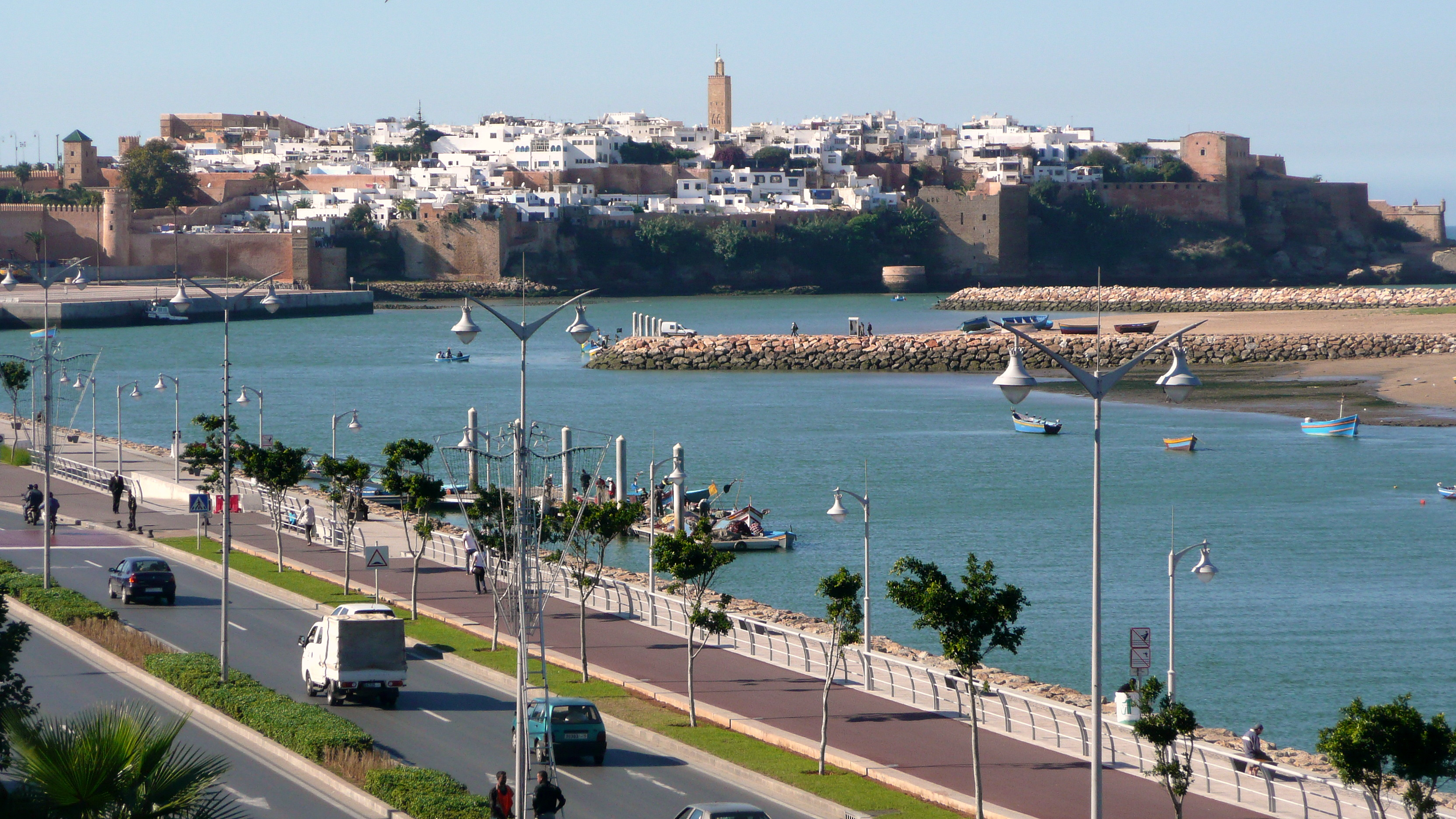
- Date: April
- Location: Rabat, Morocco
- Event type: Road Marathon, half marathon, 10K
- Established: 2015; 11 years ago
- Course records: Men's: 2:07:52 (2024) (Ethiopia) Boki Diriba; Women's: 2:25:02 (2023) (Morocco) Rahma Tahiri
- Website: Rabat Marathon

The Rabat Marathon (Note: French: Marathon de Rabat) (also known as the Rabat International Marathon (Note: French: Marathon International de Rabat)) is an annual road-based marathon hosted by Rabat, Morocco, since 2015. The marathon is a World Athletics Label Road Race. During the race weekend, a half marathon and a 10K race are also offered.

== History ==
The inaugural race was held on 19 April 2015. The marathon was won by Kenyan runners Justus Kimutai and Pamela Rotich, with finish times of 2:10:38 and 2:30:25, respectively. All six marathon podium finishers that year were Kenyan.

The 2020 edition of the race was cancelled due to the coronavirus pandemic. The marathon was also not held in 2021 and 2022 on account of the pandemic. The race is scheduled to return on 30 April 2023.

In the 8th edition of the marathon, Moroccan runner Rahma Tahiri broke the record for the fastest finish, previously held by fellow Moroccan Fatima Ezzahra Gardadi.

== Course ==
The marathon begins and ends outside the Moulay Abdellah Sports Complex. It consists roughly of two mostly overlapping loops.

== Winners ==
Ed.	Date	Male Winner	Time	Female Winner	Time	Rf.
1	2015.04.19	Justus Kimutai (KEN)	2:10:38	Pamela Rotich (KEN)	2:30:25	
2	2016.03.13	Sammy Kigen (KEN)	2:09:23	Pamela Rotich (KEN)	2:28:06	
3	2017.03.05	Fikadu Kebede (ETH)	2:09:37	Worknesh Alemu (ETH)	2:30:04	
4	2018.03.04	Assefa Bentayehu (ETH)	2:12:23	Lydia Cheromei (KEN)	2:28:48	
5	2019.04.21	Sammy Kigen (KEN)	2:08:12	Sylvia Kibet (KEN)	2:25:52	
—	2020	cancelled due to coronavirus pandemic				
—	—	not held in 2021 and 2022 due to coronavirus pandemic				
6	2023.04.30	Yassine El Allami (MAR)	2:09:27	Fatima Gardadi (MAR)	2:25:03	
7	2024.04.21	Robert Kwambai (KEN)	2:09:06	Rahma Tahiri (MAR)	2:25:30	
8	2025.04.27	Abel Chelangat (UGA)	2:09:25	Rahma Tahiri (MAR)	2:25:02	
9	2026.05.10	Boki Diriba (ETH)	2:07:52	Alemtsehay Asefa (ETH)	2:25:03	
