= Rahma Tahiri =

Moroccan long-distance runner

Personal information
- Born: 9 August 1998 (age 27) Tiflet, Morocco

Sport
- Sport: Track and field

Achievements and titles
- Personal bests: 5000 m: 15:41.91 (2023); Half marathon: 1:08.34 (2024); Marathon: 2:24:51 (2024)
Medal record
Mediterranean Games
Silver medal – second place	2022 Oran	5000 metres

Rahma Tahiri (Arabic: رحمة طاهري, romanized: Raḥmah Ṭāhirī; born 9 August 1998) is a Moroccan long-distance runner.

== Career ==
In 2021 she became Moroccan champion for the first time, in the 5000 metres event. At the 2021 Arab Championships she won the bronze medal in the 1500 metres and gold medal in the 5000. Another medal followed in 2022, when she won the 5000 metres silver at the 2022 Mediterranean Games in addition to finishing eighth at the Arab Cross Country Championships and sixth at the 2021 Islamic Solidarity Games (held in 2022).

In 2023 she won several gold medals in the 5000 metres: the Moroccan Championships, the 2023 Arab Championships and the 2023 Jeux de la Francophonie. She also won the half marathon at the 2023 Jeux de la Francophonie, finished eighth at the 2023 World Road Running Championships and fourth in the relay event at the 2024 World Cross Country Championships.

In 2024 she also equalled the List of Moroccan half marathon record, winning the Marrakesh International Half Marathon in 1:08:34 hours. She also won the 2024 Rabat Marathon before competing without finishing the marathon race at the 2024 Olympic Games. She also took a back-to-back victory at the 2025 Rabat Marathon and competed at the 2025 World Championships.
