= Larissa Bertényi =

Swiss hurdler (born 2000)

Personal information
- Born: 3 June 2000 (age 26)

Sport
- Sport: Athletics
- Event: Hurdles

Achievements and titles
- Personal bests: 60 m hurdles: 8.21 s (2026); 100 m hurdles: 13.19 s (2025)
Medal record
Women's athletics
Representing Switzerland
Summer World University Games
Silver medal – second place	2025 Bochum	4 × 100 m relay
Francophone Games
Bronze medal – third place	2023 Kinsasha	100 m hurdles

Larissa Bertényi (born 3 June 2000) is a Swiss hurdler. She was a silver medalist in the 4 × 100 metres relay and competed in the 100 metres hurdles at the 2025 Summer World University Games.

== Biography ==
Bertényi is from Widnau, and has competed as a member of STV Balgach and LC Brühl. In 2018, she became Swiss U20 champion in the sprint hurdles, both outdoors and indoors. She also experienced her international debut at the 2018 World Athletics U20 Championships in Tampere, Finland.

She was a bronze medalist in the 100 m hurdles at the 2023 Francophone Games in Kinshasa finishing behind Sidonie Fiadanantsoa and Anamaria Nesteriuc.

Selected for the 2025 Summer World University Games in Bochum, Germany, she won a silver medal at the Games in the wonen's 4 × 100 metres relay.

She ran a personal best over 60 metres hurdles in Nantes on 23 January 2026 before later lowering it to 8.06 seconds at the Swiss Indoor Championships in St Gallen on 1 March 2026, where she placed third in the final behind Ditaji Kambundji and Annik Kalin. Later that month, she was selected to represent Switzerland in the 60 metres hurdles at the 2026 World Athletics Indoor Championships in Toruń, Poland. In August 2026, she competed at the 2026 European Athletics Championships in Birmingham, England, in the women's 100 metres hurdles, reaching the semi-finals.
