= Hassan Toriss =

Moroccan long-distance runner

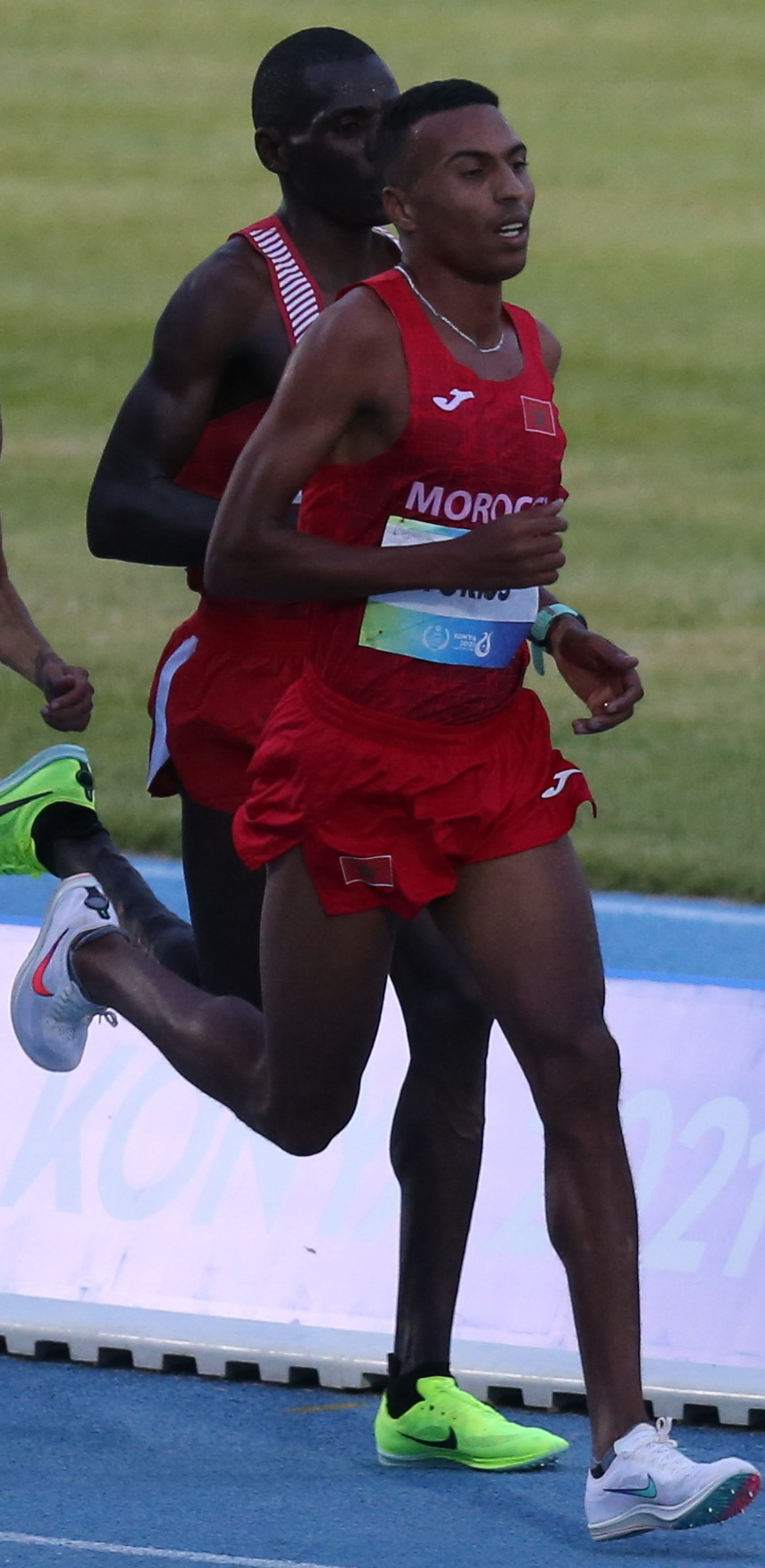
- Hassan Toriss in 2022

Personal information
- Born: 10 November 1992 (age 33)
- Died: August 1, 2026 Morocco

Sport
- Country: Morocco
- Sport: Athletics
- Event: Long-distance running

Hassan Toriss (born 10 November 1992) is a Moroccan long-distance runner. In 2020, he competed in the men's race at the 2020 World Athletics Half Marathon Championships held in Gdynia, Poland.
