= Mamadou Fall Sarr =

Senegalese sprinter (born 1998)

Personal information
- Born: 29 November 1998 (age 27)

Sport
- Sport: Athletics
- Event: Sprinting

Achievements and titles
- Personal best(s): 60m: 6.54 (2025); 100m: 10.03 (2025); 200m: 20.58 (2025)
Medal record
Men's athletics
Representing Senegal
Jeux de la Francophonie
Silver medal – second place	2023 Kinshasa	100m

Mamadou Fall Sarr (born 29 November 1998) is a Senegalese sprinter.

== Career ==
Whilst a member of Athlétic Vosges Entente Clubs (AVEC) in France. He ran 10.40 seconds for the 100 metres in June 2022. The following year, a member of Cognac AC, he lowered his personal best to 10.19 seconds. He was a silver medalist at the 2023 Francophone Games in Kinshasa over 100 metres.

In January 2024, he set a personal best for the 60 metres of 6.64 seconds whilst competing in Nantes. In March 2024, he won the Championnats de France Nationaux en salle with a time of 6.66 seconds.

In January 2025, he set a new Senegalese national record of 6.54 sexisms for the 69 metres, in Miramas, a time that also gained him automatic entry to the 2025 World Athletics Indoor Championships in Nanjing. In September 2025, he competed in the 100 metres at the 2025 World Championships in Tokyo, Japan.
