= Noa Bibi =

Mauritian sprinter (born 2000)

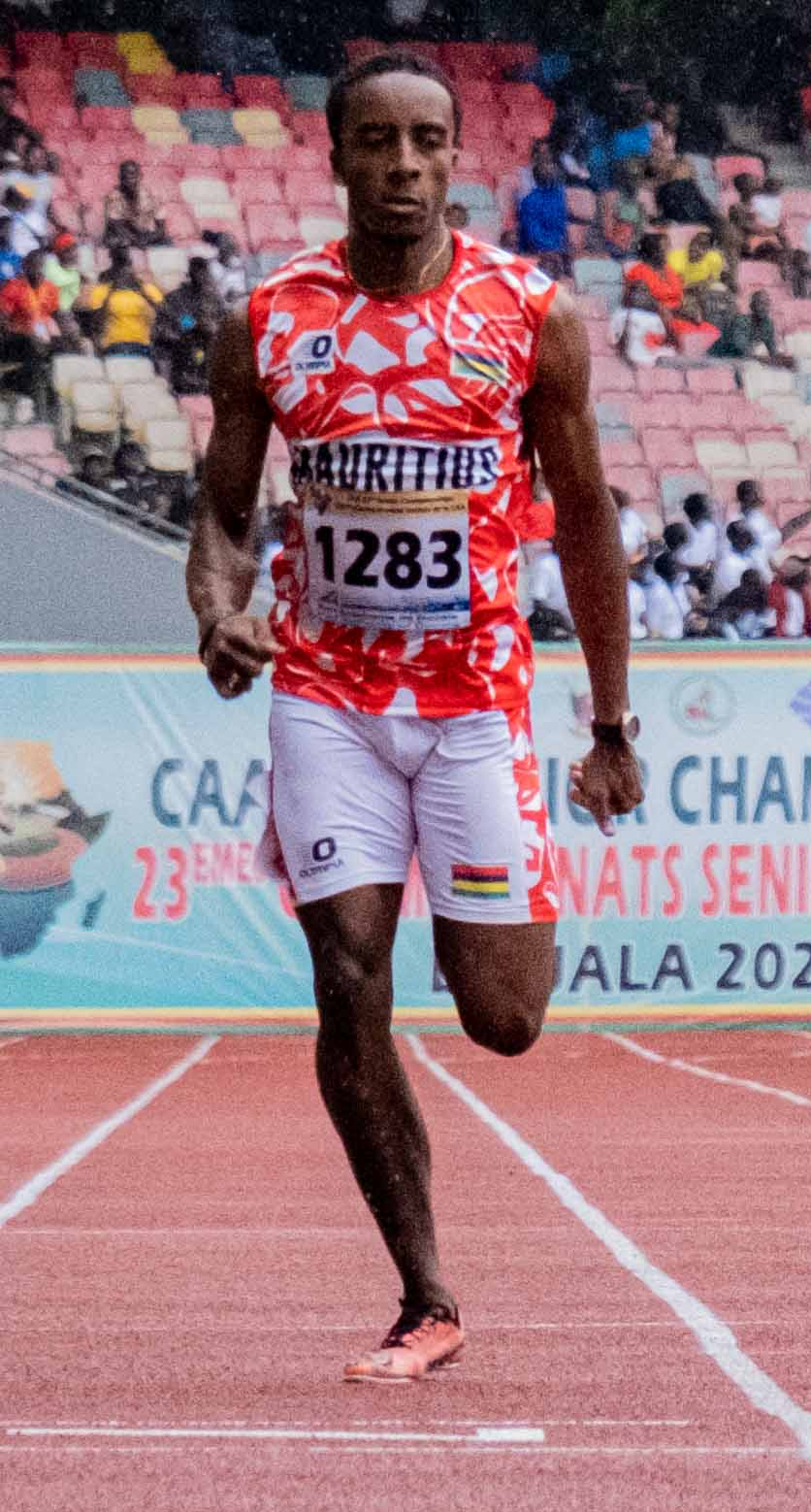
- Bibi in 2024

Personal information
- Full name: Gary Noa Jerrel Bibi
- Nationality: Mauritian
- Born: 21 August 2000 (age 25)

Sport
- Sport: Athletics
- Event: 100 meters

Achievements and titles
- Personal bests: 60 m: 6.80i (Réduit 2021); 100 m: 10.11 (Colmar 2022) NR; 200 m: 19.89 (Albi 2022) NR
Medal record
Men's athletics
Representing Mauritius
Indian Ocean Island Games
Gold medal – first place	2023 Madagascar	100 m
Gold medal – first place	2023 Madagascar	200 m
Gold medal – first place	2023 Madagascar	4 x 100 m relay
Jeux de la Francophonie
Bronze medal – third place	2023 Kinshasa	4 x 100 m relay

Gary Noa Jerrel Bibi (born 21 August 2000) is a Mauritian sprinter. He is the Mauritian national record holder for the 100 metres with his time of 10.11, and the 200 metres, with his time of 19.89, set in Albi, France in July 2022 at the French U23 Championships. This made him the first ever Mauritian athlete to break 20 seconds in the event. He also competed at the 2019 and 2023 African Games.

In 2024, he qualified for the 100 meters at the 2024 Summer Olympics.
