= Dominique Mulamba =

Congolese sprinter

Personal information
- Born: 22 October 2001 (age 24) Democratic Republic of the Congo
- Height: 1.89 m (6 ft 2 in)

Sport
- Sport: Athletics
- Events: 100 metres; 200 metres; 400 metres

Achievements and titles
- Personal bests: 100m: 10.48 (2023); 200m: 21.13 (2023); 400m: 48.19 (2023)

Dominique Lasconi Mulamba (born 22 October 2001) is a Congolese sprinter, who represents the Democratic Republic of the Congo.

Mulamba competed in the men's 100 metres event at the 2024 Summer Olympics; however, the day after his first round race, he tested positive for a banned substance and was therefore disqualified and also subsequently provisionally suspended. In May 2025, Mulamba was issued with a four-year ban backdated to August 2024 for the positive test which was confirmed as being for stanozolol.
