= Didier Kiki =

Beninese sprinter (born 1995)

Personal information
- Nationality: Benin
- Born: Didier Kiki; 30 November 1995 (age 29) Porto-Novo, Benin

Sport
- Sport: Track and Field
- Event(s): 100 m, 200 m

Didier Kiki (born 30 November 1995 in Porto-Novo) is a Beninese Olympic sprinter.

He competed at the 2016 Summer Olympics in the men's 200 metres race; his time of 22.27 seconds in the heats did not qualify him for the semifinals.

He competed in the preliminary heats in the Athletics at the 2020 Summer Olympics – Men's 100 metres in Tokyo, running a personal best of 10.69 seconds.
