= Olivier Mwimba =

Congolese sprinter

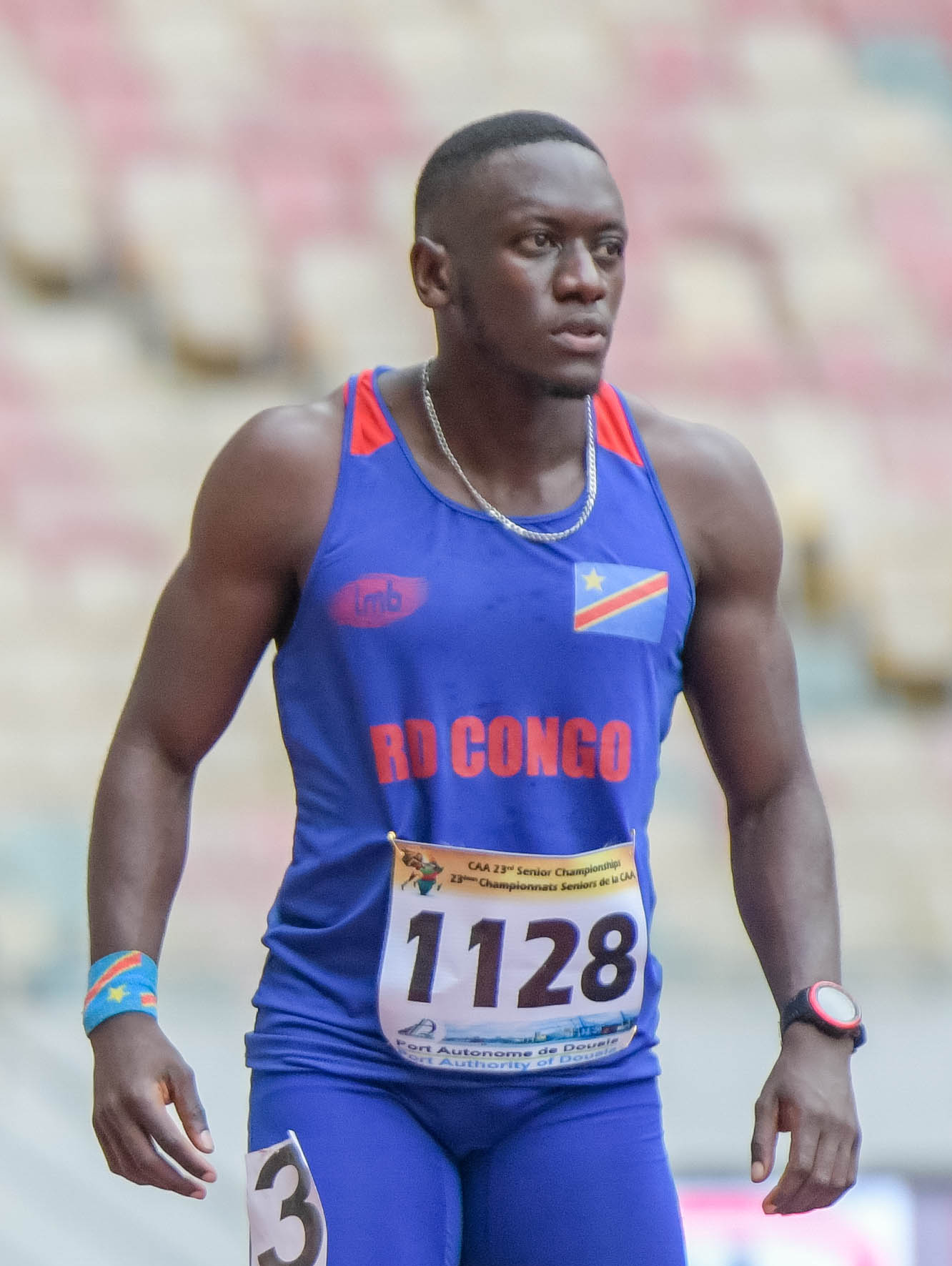

Personal information
- Full name: Olivier Mwimba Sefu
- Nationality: Democratic Republic of Congo
- Born: 6 November 1994 (age 30)

Sport
- Sport: Track and Field
- Event: 100m

Olivier Mwimba Sefu (born 6 November 1994) is an Olympic athlete from the Democratic Republic of Congo.

== Career ==
Mwimba qualified from his preliminary heat at the Athletics at the 2020 Summer Olympics – Men's 100 metres race, in a time of 10.63 seconds.

In September 2025, he was competed in the 100 metres at the 2025 World Championships in Tokyo, Japan.

== Personal life ==
Born in Zaire, Mwimba moved to South Africa at a young age and studied accounting at the Tshwane University of Technology in Pretoria.
