= Herverge Kole Etame =

Cameroonian sprinter

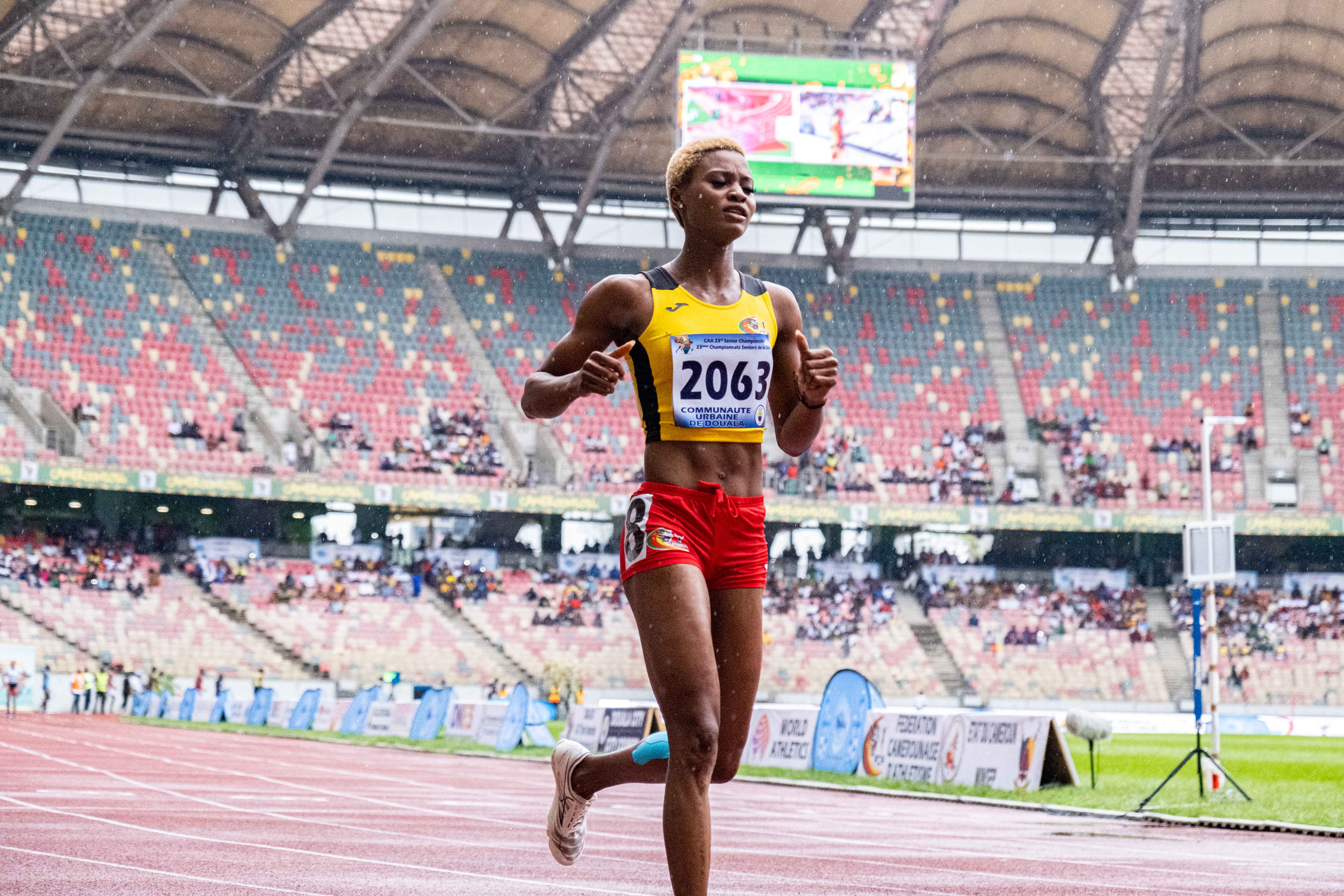
- Championnat d'athlétisme 2024

Personal information
- Full name: Herverge Tonjock Kole Etame
- Born: 22 June 2002 (age 24) Cameroon
- Height: 181 cm (5 ft 11 in)
Medal record
Women's para-athletics
Representing Cameroon
African Championships
Gold medal – first place	2026 Accra	100 m
Islamic Solidarity Games
Silver medal – second place	2025 Riyadh	100 m

Herverge Tonjock Kole Etame (born 22 June 2002 in Cameroon) is a professional sprinter specializing in the 100m, 200m, and 400m events.

== Club career ==
Herverge represented the Institut Universitaire du Golfe de Guinée (IUG) at various athletics competitions.

=== Goals and achievements ===
Herverge took part in 100 m and set a Personal Best of 11.38 seconds (6 April 2024)

In a 200 m: Personal Best of 23.15 seconds

In a 400 m: Personal Best of 52.78 seconds

In 2023 she took part in the Francophone Games winning a gold medal in the 4 × 100 m relay

Jeux Universitaires Garoua 2024: Gold medal in the 100 m

Grand Prix International CAA de Douala 2022: Gold medal in the 100 m Grand Prix International CAA de Douala | Results | World Athletics

== International career ==
Championnats d'Afrique d'Athlétisme 2024: She represented Cameroon in the 4 × 100 m relay

== Competing style ==
Herverge is known for her speed, agility, and endurance, making her a formidable competitor in sprinting events.
