= Athletics at the 2019 African Games – Men's 100 metres =

The men's 100 metres event at the 2019 African Games was held on 26 and 27 August in Rabat.

== Medalists ==
Gold	Silver	Bronze
Raymond Ekevwo; Nigeria	Arthur Cissé; Ivory Coast	Usheoritse Itsekiri; Nigeria

== Results ==
=== Heats ===
Qualification: First 3 in each heat (Q) and the next 3 fastest (q) advanced to the semifinals.

Wind:
Heat 1: +0.2 m/s, Heat 2: +0.4 m/s, Heat 3: -0.4 m/s, Heat 4: -0.3 m/s, Heat 5: +0.4 m/s, Heat 6: +0.6 m/s, Heat 7: +0.3 m/s

Rank	Heat	Name	Nationality	Time	Notes
1	5	Raymond Ekevwo	Nigeria	10.20	Q
2	6	Ebrahima Camara	Gambia	10.21	Q
3	4	Usheoritse Itsekiri	Nigeria	10.27	Q
4	4	Joseph Paul Amoah	Ghana	10.28	Q
5	4	Gue Arthur Cissé	Ivory Coast	10.30	Q
6	5	Benjamin Azamati-Kwaku	Ghana	10.32	Q
7	3	Seye Ogunlewe	Nigeria	10.36	Q
8	2	Thandolwenkosi Dlodlo	South Africa	10.37	Q
9	1	Chederick van Wyk	South Africa	10.39	Q
10	6	Karabo Mothibi	Botswana	10.43	Q
11	4	Jonathan Bardottier	Mauritius	10.44	q
12	7	Henricho Bruintjies	South Africa	10.45	Q
13	3	Dickson Kamungeremu	Zimbabwe	10.46	Q
14	1	Mosito Lehata	Lesotho	10.47	Q
15	7	Adama Jammeh	Gambia	10.49	Q
16	2	Sean Safo-Antwi	Ghana	10.51	Q
17	5	Sibusiso Matsenjwa	Eswatini	10.54	Q
18	2	Ngoni Makusha	Zimbabwe	10.56	Q
19	1	Keene Charles Motukisi	Botswana	10.57	Q
20	1	Mehdi Takordmioui	Morocco	10.57	q
21	7	Fabrice Dabla	Togo	10.60	Q
22	2	Jean Tarcisius Batambock	Cameroon	10.61	q
23	6	Dylan Sicobo	Seychelles	10.63	Q
24	7	Henry Bandiaky	Senegal	10.63	
25	5	Guy Maganga	Gabon	10.65	
26	2	Romeo Manzila Mahambou	Republic of the Congo	10.65	
27	6	Pius Adome	Uganda	10.69	
28	3	Sharry Dodin	Seychelles	10.72	Q
29	3	Gnamien Nehemie N'Goran	Ivory Coast	10.72	
30	7	Mayoumendam Zounedou	Cameroon	10.73	
31	3	Nathan Abebe	Ethiopia	10.74	
32	5	Noah Bibi	Mauritius	10.74	
33	5	Ibrahim Diomande	Ivory Coast	10.77	
34	2	Stern Noel Liffa	Malawi	10.79	
35	2	Issa Sangare	Mali	10.79	
36	6	Phomolo Lekhoana	Lesotho	10.80	
37	4	Sengan Jobe	Gambia	10.81	
38	3	Mark Otieno Odhiambo	Kenya	10.83	
39	5	Chenoult Lionel Coetzee	Namibia	10.83	
40	4	Leeroy Henriette	Seychelles	10.91	
40	6	Julius Morie	Sierra Leone	10.91	
42	7	Yateya Kambepera	Botswana	10.92	
43	1	Gift Kawale	Malawi	11.01	
44	7	Abdramane Simpore	Burkina Faso	11.02	
45	4	Aboubabacar Barry	Guinea	11.06	
46	2	Mabrouk Matar	Chad	11.08	
47	3	Solomon Obuto	Uganda	11.09	
48	5	Tewodiros Atinafu	Ethiopia	11.20	
49	1	Alpha Breezy Kamara	Sierra Leone	11.21	
50	2	Yannick Badibanga Tshibenga	Democratic Republic of the Congo	11.29	
51	1	Abdusetar Kemal	Ethiopia	11.29	
52	6	Samuel Ekembe Bokabo	Democratic Republic of the Congo	11.43	
53	1	Santander Villarubia	Equatorial Guinea	11.49	
54	7	Ndong Gregorio	Equatorial Guinea	11.86	
	3	Gilbert Hainuca	Namibia	DQ	R162.7
	4	Machmour Chakir	Morocco	DQ	R162.7

=== Semifinals ===
Qualification: First 2 in each semifinal (Q) and the next 2 fastest (q) advanced to the final.

Wind:
Heat 1: -0.6 m/s, Heat 2: ? m/s, Heat 3: -0.1 m/s

Rank	Heat	Name	Nationality	Time	Notes
1	2	Usheoritse Itsekiri	Nigeria	10.25	Q
2	3	Raymond Ekevwo	Nigeria	10.26	Q
3	1	Ebrahima Camara	Gambia	10.27	Q
4	1	Gue Arthur Cissé	Ivory Coast	10.27	Q
5	2	Joseph Paul Amoah	Ghana	10.36	Q
6	2	Thandolwenkosi Dlodlo	South Africa	10.38	q
7	3	Sean Safo-Antwi	Ghana	10.41	Q
8	3	Chederick van Wyk	South Africa	10.41	q
9	1	Benjamin Azamati-Kwaku	Ghana	10.43	
10	3	Henricho Bruintjies	South Africa	10.43	
11	3	Mosito Lehata	Lesotho	10.44	
12	1	Seye Ogunlewe	Nigeria	10.45	
13	1	Sibusiso Matsenjwa	Eswatini	10.54	
13	2	Ngoni Makusha	Zimbabwe	10.54	
15	1	Karabo Mothibi	Botswana	10.55	
16	1	Jonathan Bardottier	Mauritius	10.57	
17	3	Fabrice Dabla	Togo	10.66	
18	2	Keene Charles Motukisi	Botswana	10.71	
19	3	Jean Tarcisius Batambock	Cameroon	10.74	
20	1	Sharry Dodin	Seychelles	10.76	
21	2	Dylan Sicobo	Seychelles	10.80	
	2	Dickson Kamungeremu	Zimbabwe	DNF	
	3	Adama Jammeh	Gambia	DNF	
	2	Mehdi Takordmioui	Morocco	DQ	R162.7

=== Final ===
Wind: +1.6 m/s

Rank	Lane	Name	Nationality	Time	Notes
1st place, gold medalist(s)	7	Raymond Ekevwo	Nigeria	9.96	
2nd place, silver medalist(s)	5	Arthur Cissé	Ivory Coast	9.97	
3rd place, bronze medalist(s)	4	Usheoritse Itsekiri	Nigeria	10.02	
4	8	Joseph Paul Amoah	Ghana	10.11	
5	9	Sean Safo-Antwi	Ghana	10.18	
6	2	Chederick van Wyk	South Africa	10.31	
7	6	Ebrahima Camara	Gambia	10.33	
8	3	Thandolwenkosi Dlodlo	South Africa	10.33	
