= Athletics at the 2019 African Games – Men's 200 metres =

The men's 200 metres event at the 2019 African Games was held on 29 and 30 August in Rabat.

== Medalists ==
Gold	Silver	Bronze
Sydney Siame; Zambia	Divine Oduduru; Nigeria	Anaso Jobodwana; South Africa

== Results ==
=== Heats ===
Qualification: First 2 in each heat (Q) and the next 8 fastest (q) advanced to the semifinals.

Wind:
Heat 1: +0.5 m/s, Heat 2: -0.3 m/s, Heat 3: +0.4 m/s, Heat 4: +0.4 m/s, Heat 5: +0.5 m/s, Heat 6: +0.3 m/s, Heat 7: +0.2 m/s, Heat 8: +0.3 m/s

Rank	Heat	Name	Nationality	Time	Notes
1	4	Sydney Siame	Zambia	20.61	Q
2	6	Divine Oduduru	Nigeria	20.73	Q
3	4	Ogho-Oghene Egwero	Nigeria	20.75	Q
4	8	Edwin Kwabla Gadayi	Ghana	20.81	Q
5	5	Sibusiso Matsenjwa	Eswatini	20.84	Q
6	8	Ebrahima Camara	Gambia	20.84	Q
7	6	Guy Maganga	Gabon	20.86	Q
8	4	Chederick van Wyk	South Africa	20.87	q
9	2	Mike Mokamba Nyang'au	Kenya	20.91	Q
10	7	Anaso Jobodwana	South Africa	20.91	Q
11	7	Mehdi Takordmioui	Morocco	20.92	Q
12	6	Leaname Maotoanong	Botswana	20.92	q
13	8	Ngoni Makusha	Zimbabwe	20.93	q
14	2	Martin Owusu-Antwi	Ghana	20.94	Q
15	5	Emmanuel Arowolo	Nigeria	21.05	Q
16	2	Mosito Lehata	Lesotho	21.05	q
17	3	Dan Kiviasi Asamba	Kenya	21.10	Q
18	1	Jonathan Bardottier	Mauritius	21.11	Q
19	1	Gideon Ernst Narib	Namibia	21.12	Q
20	1	Tatenda Tsumba	Zimbabwe	21.13	q
21	6	Joseph Amoah	Ghana	21.20	q
22	4	Ali Khamis Gulam	Tanzania	21.25	q
23	1	Karabo Mothibi	Botswana	21.25	q
24	4	Stern Noel Liffa	Malawi	21.31	
25	5	Alieu Joof	Gambia	21.33	
26	7	Raphael Ngagule Mberlina	Cameroon	21.38	
27	8	Yapo Jacky	Ivory Coast	21.43	
28	3	Andile Lusenga	Eswatini	21.44	Q
29	2	Kundai Maguranyanga	Zimbabwe	21.47	
30	5	Benson Okot	Uganda	21.48	
31	3	Henry Bandiaky	Senegal	21.59	
32	7	Mustapha Traoré	Mali	21.72	
33	2	Sengan Jobe	Gambia	21.74	
34	7	Phomolo Lekhoana	Lesotho	21.83	
35	3	Ibrahim Diomande	Ivory Coast	21.83	
36	3	Henok Birhanu	Ethiopia	21.95	
37	8	Gift Kawale	Malawi	22.05	
38	1	Alford Conteh	Sierra Leone	22.09	
39	3	Mabrouk Matar	Chad	22.11	
40	4	Nathan Abebe	Ethiopia	22.15	
41	2	Aboubabacar Barry	Guinea	22.40	
42	7	Esmaiel Freitas	São Tomé and Príncipe	22.57	
43	3	Yannick Badibanga Tshibenga	Democratic Republic of the Congo	22.65	
44	5	Benjamini Michael Kulwa	Tanzania	22.71	
45	1	Villarubia Santander	Equatorial Guinea	22.81	
46	1	Cheick Aboubacar Camara	Guinea	22.88	
47	6	Alpha Breezy Kamara	Sierra Leone	23.65	
	5	Baboloki Thebe	Botswana	DNF	
	5	Kamuaruuma Sydney	Namibia	DNF	
	7	Pius Adome	Uganda	DNF	
	8	Fabrice Dabla	Togo	DNF	
	2	Gue Arthur Cissé	Ivory Coast	DNS	
	4	Emmanuel Eseme	Cameroon	DNS	
	6	Alexander Mahmad Bock	Namibia	DNS	
	6	Leeroy Henriette	Seychelles	DNS	
	8	Sharry Dodin	Seychelles	DNS	

=== Semifinals ===
Qualification: First 2 in each semifinal (Q) and the next 2 fastest (q) advanced to the final.

Wind:
Heat 1: +0.9 m/s, Heat 2: 0.0 m/s, Heat 3: -0.2 m/s

Rank	Heat	Name	Nationality	Time	Notes
1	1	Divine Oduduru	Nigeria	20.45	Q
2	2	Sydney Siame	Zambia	20.67	Q
3	1	Guy Maganga	Gabon	20.71	Q
4	1	Mike Mokamba Nyang'au	Kenya	20.72	q
5	3	Ogho-Oghene Egwero	Nigeria	20.76	Q
6	1	Leaname Maotoanong	Botswana	20.78	q
7	3	Sibusiso Matsenjwa	Eswatini	20.80	Q
8	3	Ebrahima Camara	Gambia	20.82	
9	2	Anaso Jobodwana	South Africa	20.82	Q
10	1	Mosito Lehata	Lesotho	20.87	
11	3	Edwin Kwabla Gadayi	Ghana	20.92	
12	2	Martin Owusu-Antwi	Ghana	20.97	
13	1	Jonathan Bardottier	Mauritius	20.98	
14	2	Emmanuel Arowolo	Nigeria	21.01	
15	2	Dan Kiviasi Asamba	Kenya	21.02	
16	2	Ngoni Makusha	Zimbabwe	21.08	
17	3	Gideon Ernst Narib	Namibia	21.17	
18	3	Chederick van Wyk	South Africa	21.22	
19	2	Mehdi Takordmioui	Morocco	21.24	
20	1	Andile Lusenga	Eswatini	21.25	
21	3	Ali Khamis Gulam	Tanzania	21.33	
	3	Tatenda Tsumba	Zimbabwe	DQ	R162.7
	1	Joseph Amoah	Ghana	DNS	
	2	Karabo Mothibi	Botswana	DNS	

=== Final ===
Wind: -0.8 m/s

Rank	Lane	Name	Nationality	Time	Notes
1st place, gold medalist(s)	6	Sydney Siame	Zambia	20.35	
2nd place, silver medalist(s)	3	Divine Oduduru	Nigeria	20.54	
3rd place, bronze medalist(s)	7	Anaso Jobodwana	South Africa	20.56	
4	5	Guy Maganga	Gabon	20.77	
5	8	Sibusiso Matsenjwa	Eswatini	20.83	
6	4	Ogho-Oghene Egwero	Nigeria	21.00	
7	2	Leaname Maotoanong	Botswana	21.04	
8	1	Mike Mokamba Nyang'au	Kenya	21.05	
