= 2022 African Championships in Athletics – Men's 200 metres =

The men's 200 metres event at the 2022 African Championships in Athletics was held on 11 and 12 June in Port Louis, Mauritius.

== Medalists ==
Gold	Silver	Bronze
Letsile Tebogo; Botswana	Emmanuel Eseme; Cameroon	Clarence Munyai; South Africa

== Results ==
=== Heats ===
Held on 11 June

Qualification: First 2 of each heat (Q) and the next 8 fastest (q) qualified for the semifinals.

Wind:
Heat 1: +3.0 m/s, Heat 2: +3.0 m/s, Heat 3: +2.7 m/s, Heat 4: +2.9 m/s, Heat 5: +3.2 m/s, Heat 6: +2.4 m/s, Heat 7: +1.8 m/s, Heat 8: +2.1 m/s

Rank	Heat	Name	Nationality	Time	Notes
1	1	Noa Bibi	Mauritius	20.42	Q
2	7	Letsile Tebogo	Botswana	20.48	Q
3	2	Joseph Paul Amoah	Ghana	20.52	Q
4	2	Emmanuel Eseme	Cameroon	20.54	Q
5	1	Arthur Cissé	Ivory Coast	20.60	Q
6	3	Clarence Munyai	South Africa	20.62	Q
7	1	Sinesipho Dambile	South Africa	20.64	q
8	3	Mike Nyang'au	Kenya	20.77	Q
9	3	Tapiwa Makarawu	Zimbabwe	20.83	q
10	2	Chidi Okezie	Nigeria	20.84	q
11	8	Benjamin Richardson	South Africa	20.87	Q
12	2	Stern Liffa	Malawi	20.88	q
12	5	Akeem Sirleaf	Liberia	20.88	Q
14	2	Hachim Maaroufou	Comoros	20.91	q
15	3	Guy Maganga Gorra	Gabon	20.92	q
16	1	Gilbert Hainuca	Namibia	20.95	q
17	1	Lasconi Mulamba	Democratic Republic of the Congo	20.96	q
17	4	Sydney Siame	Zambia	20.96	Q
19	4	Wellington Zaza	Liberia	20.97	Q
19	8	Anthony Pesela	Botswana	20.97	Q
21	5	Kakene Sitali	Zambia	20.99	Q
22	8	Adekalu Fakorede	Nigeria	21.00	
23	7	Emmanuel Matadi	Liberia	21.01	Q
24	3	Ebrahima Camara	Gambia	21.04	
25	3	Sibusiso Matsenjwa	Eswatini	21.08	
26	6	Ngoni Makusha	Zimbabwe	21.11	Q
27	1	Jayson Mandoze	Botswana	21.12	
27	4	Alieu Joof	Gambia	21.12	
29	4	Raphael Ngaguele Mberlina	Cameroon	21.14	
30	5	Sengan Jobe	Gambia	21.16	
30	7	Ferdinand Omurwa	Kenya	21.16	
32	2	Ivan Danny Geldenhuys	Namibia	21.32	
32	6	Dan Asamba	Kenya	21.32	Q
34	2	Cyrille Rasoamanana	Réunion	21.35	
35	6	Pius Adome	Uganda	21.38	
36	5	Gideon Ernst Narib	Namibia	21.40	
37	4	Denzel Siamsialela	Zimbabwe	21.53	
38	7	Mcebo Mkhaliphi	Eswatini	21.56	
39	2	Ahmed Amaar	Libya	21.57	
39	6	Louis François Mendy	Senegal	21.57	
41	5	Cédric Lacouture	Réunion	21.60	
42	8	Alvin Rughoodass	Mauritius	21.61	
43	1	Sylvain Benandro	Madagascar	21.62	
44	6	Médard Nayo	Togo	21.67	
45	4	Assadillah Karani Hassani	Comoros	21.70	
46	8	Denzel Adem	Seychelles	21.74	
47	7	Haron Adoli	Uganda	21.76	
48	5	Eriema Kere	Ethiopia	21.82	
49	4	Lionel Muteba	Democratic Republic of the Congo	21.84	
50	5	El Hadji Malick Diop	Senegal	21.88	
51	8	Semi Thiel	South Sudan	21.91	
52	7	Ogho-Oghene Egwero	Nigeria	22.08	
53	1	Leeroy Henriette	Seychelles	22.14	
54	3	Didier Kiki	Benin	22.34	
55	6	Ahmed Musa	Ethiopia	22.44	
56	7	Edmond Hounthon	Benin	22.64	
	6	Ayanda Malaza	Eswatini	DNS	
	8	Gange Etemabeka	Republic of the Congo	DNS	
	8	Corneille Junior Ayingouka	Central African Republic	DNS	

=== Semifinals ===
Held on 11 June

Qualification: First 2 of each semifinal (Q) and the next 2 fastest (q) qualified for the final.

Wind:
Heat 1: +3.0 m/s, Heat 2: +2.4 m/s, Heat 3: +3.6 m/s

Rank	Heat	Name	Nationality	Time	Notes
1	1	Clarence Munyai	South Africa	20.52	Q
2	2	Letsile Tebogo	Botswana	20.58	Q
3	2	Sinesipho Dambile	South Africa	20.69	Q
4	1	Emmanuel Eseme	Cameroon	20.73	Q, 20.726
5	1	Arthur Cissé	Ivory Coast	20.73	q, 20.729
6	2	Akeem Sirleaf	Liberia	20.75	q
7	3	Noa Bibi	Mauritius	20.82	Q
8	1	Joseph Paul Amoah	Ghana	20.89	
9	3	Chidi Okezie	Nigeria	21.01	Q, 21.005
10	3	Anthony Pesela	Botswana	21.01	21.010
11	2	Mike Nyang'au	Kenya	21.06	
12	3	Wellington Zaza	Liberia	21.09	
13	3	Benjamin Richardson	South Africa	21.11	
14	1	Guy Maganga Gorra	Gabon	21.12	
15	2	Kakene Sitali	Zambia	21.19	
16	3	Tapiwa Makarawu	Zimbabwe	21.20	
17	1	Hachim Maaroufou	Comoros	21.24	
18	3	Sydney Siame	Zambia	21.31	
19	2	Ngoni Makusha	Zimbabwe	21.32	
20	2	Gilbert Hainuca	Namibia	21.60	
21	2	Stern Liffa	Malawi	21.63	
22	1	Dan Asamba	Kenya	21.79	
23	3	Lasconi Mulamba	Democratic Republic of the Congo	21.79	
	1	Emmanuel Matadi	Liberia	DNF	

=== Final ===
Held on 12 June

Wind: +3.0 m/s

Rank	Lane	Athlete	Nationality	Time	Notes
1st place, gold medalist(s)	5	Letsile Tebogo	Botswana	20.26	
2nd place, silver medalist(s)	2	Emmanuel Eseme	Cameroon	20.61	
3rd place, bronze medalist(s)	6	Clarence Munyai	South Africa	20.69	
4	7	Chidi Okezie	Nigeria	21.02	
5	4	Sinesipho Dambile	South Africa	21.18	
6	8	Akeem Sirleaf	Liberia	21.21	
7	3	Noa Bibi	Mauritius	21.25	
	1	Arthur Cissé	Ivory Coast	DNS	
