= 2022 African Championships in Athletics – Men's 100 metres =

The men's 100 metres event at the 2022 African Championships in Athletics was held on 8 and 9 June in Port Louis, Mauritius.

== Medalists ==
Gold	Silver	Bronze
Ferdinand Omanyala; Kenya	Akani Simbine; South Africa	Henricho Bruintjies; South Africa

== Results ==
=== Heats ===
Held on 8 June

Qualification: First 2 of each heat (Q) and the next 8 fastest (q) qualified for the semifinals.

Wind:
Heat 1: +2.0 m/s, Heat 2: +1.6 m/s, Heat 3: -0.1 m/s, Heat 4: +2.5 m/s, Heat 5: +0.6 m/s, Heat 6: +1.3 m/s, Heat 7: +2.9 m/s, Heat 8: +2.2 m/s

Rank	Heat	Name	Nationality	Time	Notes
1	1	Ferdinand Omanyala	Kenya	10.05	Q
2	1	Raymond Ekevwo	Nigeria	10.11	Q
3	4	Arthur Cissé	Ivory Coast	10.13	Q
3	7	Emmanuel Matadi	Liberia	10.13	Q
3	7	Ebrahima Camara	Gambia	10.13	Q
6	5	Akani Simbine	South Africa	10.14	Q
7	2	Emmanuel Eseme	Cameroon	10.17	Q
8	4	Henricho Bruintjies	South Africa	10.20	Q
8	8	Noa Bibi	Mauritius	10.20	Q
10	6	Gilbert Hainuca	Namibia	10.23	Q
11	7	Seye Ogunlewe	Nigeria	10.24	q
12	2	Akeem Sirleaf	Liberia	10.25	Q
13	2	Sean Safo-Antwi	Ghana	10.28	q
14	7	Ngoni Makusha	Zimbabwe	10.31	q
14	7	Raphael Ngaguele Mberlina	Cameroon	10.31	q
16	1	Stern Liffa	Malawi	10.33	q, NR
16	7	Tumo Stagato Lesesere	Botswana	10.33	q
18	5	Samwel Imeta	Kenya	10.34	Q
19	2	Sydney Siame	Zambia	10.35	q
20	1	Sibusiso Matsenjwa	Eswatini	10.38	q
21	3	Kakene Sitali	Zambia	10.43	Q
22	1	Guy Maganga Gorra	Gabon	10.47	
22	6	Mojela Koneshe	Lesotho	10.47	Q
24	4	Dickson Kamungeremu	Zimbabwe	10.48	
24	8	Benson Okot	Uganda	10.48	Q
26	8	Oliver Mwimba	Democratic Republic of the Congo	10.53	
27	5	Nicholas Mabilo	Nigeria	10.54	
28	1	Pius Adome	Uganda	10.56	
29	8	Ahmed Amaar	Libya	10.57	
30	3	Stephen Abosi	Botswana	10.58	Q
30	4	Benele Dlamini	Eswatini	10.58	
32	6	Adama Jammeh	Gambia	10.59	
33	4	Telvin Jallah	Liberia	10.61	
34	5	Médard Nayo	Togo	10.62	
35	4	Dan Asamba	Kenya	10.63	
36	3	Gideon Ernst Narib	Namibia	10.70	
36	5	Joshan Vencatasamy	Mauritius	10.70	
36	6	Dylan Sicobo	Seychelles	10.70	
39	6	Lionel Muteba	Democratic Republic of the Congo	10.71	
40	8	Didier Kiki	Benin	10.73	
41	5	Thuto Masasa	Botswana	10.74	
42	5	Sharry Dodin	Seychelles	10.75	
43	1	Abdramane Simpore	Burkina Faso	10.78	
44	5	Assadillah Karani Hassani	Comoros	10.79	
44	6	Hajatiana Randrianasolo	Réunion	10.79	
46	7	Panashe Nhenga	Zimbabwe	10.79	
47	4	Menziwokuhle Msibi	Eswatini	10.85	
48	2	Locho Kiyonga	Ethiopia	10.88	
49	3	Stone Kabamb Preben	Democratic Republic of the Congo	11.01	
50	6	Boubacar Barry	Guinea	11.12	
51	3	Serigne Salio Dia	Mauritania	11.90	
	1	Momodou Sey	Gambia	DNS	
	2	Carlos Gwerendende	Zimbabwe	DNS	
	2	Nantenaina Rakotoarinirina	Madagascar	DNS	
	2	Elias Tirani	Tanzania	DNS	
	3	Isac Bangura	Guinea-Bissau	DNS	
	3	Roméo Manzila	Republic of the Congo	DNS	
	4	Abdelrahman Karam	Egypt	DNS	
	7	Jean Charles Cantusan	Guinea-Bissau	DNS	
	8	Remigio Santander	Equatorial Guinea	DNS	
	8	Mohamed Aburass	Sudan	DNS	

=== Semifinals ===
Held on 8 June

Qualification: First 2 of each semifinal (Q) and the next 2 fastest (q) qualified for the final.

Wind:
Heat 1: +2.2 m/s, Heat 2: +1.1 m/s, Heat 3: +2.6 m/s

Rank	Heat	Name	Nationality	Time	Notes
1	1	Ferdinand Omanyala	Kenya	10.07	Q
2	3	Akani Simbine	South Africa	10.09	Q
3	3	Emmanuel Matadi	Liberia	10.13	Q
4	1	Gilbert Hainuca	Namibia	10.15	Q
4	3	Raymond Ekevwo	Nigeria	10.15	q
6	2	Emmanuel Eseme	Cameroon	10.19	Q
7	2	Henricho Bruintjies	South Africa	10.21	Q
8	1	Noa Bibi	Mauritius	10.24	q
9	1	Akeem Sirleaf	Liberia	10.25	
10	2	Samwel Imeta	Kenya	10.27	
11	1	Ngoni Makusha	Zimbabwe	10.29	
11	2	Seye Ogunlewe	Nigeria	10.29	
13	2	Arthur Cissé	Ivory Coast	10.30	
14	1	Sean Safo-Antwi	Ghana	10.31	
15	2	Kakene Sitali	Zambia	10.33	
16	3	Ebrahima Camara	Gambia	10.38	
17	1	Mojela Koneshe	Lesotho	10.40	
18	1	Sibusiso Matsenjwa	Eswatini	10.41	
19	3	Stern Liffa	Malawi	10.45	
20	2	Sydney Siame	Zambia	10.50	
20	3	Stephen Abosi	Botswana	10.50	
22	2	Raphael Ngaguele Mberlina	Cameroon	10.54	
22	3	Tumo Stagato Lesesere	Botswana	10.54	
24	3	Benson Okot	Uganda	12.26	

=== Final ===
Held on 9 June

Wind: +4.5 m/s

Rank	Lane	Athlete	Nationality	Time	Notes
1st place, gold medalist(s)	6	Ferdinand Omanyala	Kenya	9.93	9.927
2nd place, silver medalist(s)	5	Akani Simbine	South Africa	9.93	9.930
3rd place, bronze medalist(s)	8	Henricho Bruintjies	South Africa	10.01	
4	1	Raymond Ekevwo	Nigeria	10.03	
5	3	Emmanuel Eseme	Cameroon	10.06	
6	4	Emmanuel Matadi	Liberia	10.08	
7	2	Noa Bibi	Mauritius	10.14	
	7	Gilbert Hainuca	Namibia	DQ	FS
