= Athletics at the 2019 African Games – Men's 4 × 100 metres relay =

Athletics at the 2019 African Games Men's 4×100 metres relay

The men's 4 × 100 metres relay event at the 2019 African Games was held on 27 and 28 August in Rabat.

== Medalists ==
Gold	Silver	Bronze
Ghana; Sean Safo-Antwi; Benjamin Azamati-Kwaku; Martin Owusu-Antwi; Joseph Amoah	Nigeria; Raymond Ekevwo; Divine Oduduru; Emmanuel Arowolo; Usheoritse Itsekiri; Ogho-Oghene Egwero*; Seye Ogunlewe*	South Africa; Henricho Bruintjies; Anaso Jobodwana; Thando Dlodlo; Chederick van Wyk; Derrick Mokaleng*

*Athletes who competed in heats only

== Results ==
=== Heats ===
Qualification: First 3 teams of each heat (Q) plus the next 2 fastest (q) qualified for the final.

Rank	Heat	Nation	Athletes	Time	Notes
1	2	Ghana	Sean Safo-Antwi, Benjamin Azamati-Kwaku, Martin Owusu-Antwi, Joseph Amoah	38.80	Q
2	1	Nigeria	Ogho-Oghene Egwero, Divine Oduduru, Emmanuel Arowolo, Adeseye Ogunlewe	39.15	Q
3	1	Gambia	Sengan Jobe, Modou Lamin Bah, Alieu Joof, Ebrahima Camara	39.49	Q, NR
4	2	South Africa	Henricho Bruintjies, Anaso Jobodwana, Derrick Mokaleng, Chederick van Wyk	39.76	Q
5	1	Botswana	Karabo Mothibi, Yateya Kambepera, Leaname Maotoanong, Kemorena Tisang	39.91	Q
6	2	Ivory Coast	Gnamien Nehemie N'Goran, Yapo Jacky, Ibrahim Diomande, Gue Arthur Cissé	39.97	Q
7	2	Cameroon	Jean Tarcisius Batambock, Mayoumendam Zounedou, Emmanuel Eseme, ?	40.01	q
8	2	Zimbabwe	Kundai Maguranyanga, Tatenda Tsumba, Rodwell Ndlovu, Ngoni Makusha	40.14	q
9	1	Mauritius	Noah Bibi, Jeremy Cotte, Jeremie Lararaudeuse, Jonathan Bardottier	40.44	
10	2	Namibia	Kamuaruuma Sydney, Gilbert Hainuca, Chenoult Coetzee, Dantago Gurirab	41.03	
11	1	Kenya	Mark Otieno Odhiambo, Mike Mokamba Nyang'au, Abel Kipsang Bele, Nicholas Kiplangat Kipkoech	41.28	
12	2	Ethiopia	Abdusetar Kemal, Tewodiros Atinafu, Nathan Abebe, Henok Birhanu	42.09	
	1	Seychelles		DNS	
	1	Senegal		DNS	
	2	Uganda		DNS	

=== Final ===
Rank	Lane	Nation	Athletes	Time	Notes
1st place, gold medalist(s)	6	Ghana	Sean Safo-Antwi, Benjamin Azamati-Kwaku, Martin Owusu-Antwi, Joseph Amoah	38.30	GR
2nd place, silver medalist(s)	4	Nigeria	Raymond Ekevwo, Divine Oduduru, Emmanuel Arowolo, Usheoritse Itsekiri	38.59	
3rd place, bronze medalist(s)	5	South Africa	Henricho Bruintjies, Anaso Jobodwana, Thando Dlodlo, Chederick van Wyk	38.80	
4	3	Gambia	Sengan Jobe, Momodou Sey, Alieu Joof, Ebrahima Camara	39.44	NR
5	8	Botswana	Karabo Mothibi, Yateya Kambepera, Keene Charles Motukisi, Zibani Ngozi	39.52	
6	1	Zimbabwe	Dickson Kamungeremu, Tatenda Tsumba, Kundai Maguranyanga, Ngoni Makusha	39.82	
7	2	Cameroon	Jean Tarcisius Batambock, Nsangou Tetndap, Mayoumendam Zounedou, Raphael Ngague Mberlina	40.12	
8	7	Ivory Coast	Gnamien Nehemie N'Goran, Yapo Jacky, Mohamed Lamoni Drabo, Ibrahim Diomande	40.51	
