= Athletics at the 2023 African Games – Men's 100 metres =

Men's 100 metres at the 2023 African Games
- Venue: Legon Sports Stadium
- Location: Accra, Ghana
- Dates: 18 March (heats & semi-finals); 19 March (final)
- Competitors: 58 from 27 nations
- Winning time: 10.14

Medalists
gold medal	Emmanuel Eseme	Cameroon
silver medal	Usheoritse Itsekiri	Nigeria
bronze medal	Gilbert Hainuca	Namibia

The men's 100 metres event at the 2023 African Games was held on 18 and 19 March 2024 in Accra, Ghana.

== Results ==
=== Heats ===
Held on 18 March
Qualification: First 3 in each heat (Q) and the next 3 fastest (q) advanced to the semifinals.

Wind:
Heat 1: -0.1 m/s, Heat 2: -2.0 m/s, Heat 3: -1.5 m/s, Heat 4: -0.9 m/s, Heat 5: -1.6 m/s, Heat 6: -1.1 m/s, Heat 7: -1.4 m/s

Rank	Heat	Name	Nationality	Time	Notes
1	1	Emmanuel Eseme	Cameroon	10.15	Q
2	1	Usheoritse Itsekiri	Nigeria	10.19	Q
3	1	Noah Bibi	Mauritius	10.28	Q
4	1	Sarfo Ansah	Ghana	10.34	q
5	3	Gilbert Hainuca	Namibia	10.34	Q
6	2	Claude Itoungue Bongogne	Cameroon	10.37	Q
7	3	Kakene Sitali	Zambia	10.39	Q
8	1	Justin Chivamba	Zambia	10.40	q
9	6	Consider Ekanem	Nigeria	10.44	Q
10	2	Barnabas Aggerh	Ghana	10.46	Q
11	1	Elvis Gaseb	Namibia	10.47	q
12	7	Ebrahima Camara	The Gambia	10.49	Q
13	4	Raphael Ngaguele Mberlina	Cameroon	10.53	Q
14	5	Benjamin Azamati	Ghana	10.54	Q
15	6	Adama Jammeh	The Gambia	10.55	Q
16	5	Israel Sunday	Nigeria	10.55	Q
17	5	Thuto Masasa	Botswana	10.59	Q
17	7	Guy Maganga Gorra	Gabon	10.59	Q
19	6	Ngoni Makusha	Zimbabwe	10.59	Q
20	7	Calvin Omphile	Botswana	10.62	Q
21	6	Hesbon Ochieng	Kenya	10.63	
22	1	Gnamien Nehemie N'goran	Ivory Coast	10.64	
23	3	Chakir Machmour	Morocco	10.65	Q
24	3	Frank Hoye Moukoula Wissy	Gabon	10.66	
25	7	Stern Noel Liffa	Malawi	10.68	
26	4	Alieu Joof	The Gambia	10.71	Q
27	4	Orphee Topize	Mauritius	10.71	Q
28	6	Kossi Médard Nayo	Togo	10.72	
29	5	Stephen Onyango	Kenya	10.72	
30	6	Marcos Santos	Angola	10.72	
31	4	Samuel Waweru	Kenya	10.73	
32	1	Pius Adome	Uganda	10.75	
33	2	Mwiinga Mweemba	Zambia	10.79	Q
33	3	Lawrence Feidel	Sierra Leone	10.79	
35	5	Dickson Kamungeremu	Zimbabwe	10.80	
36	4	Jonash Moncherry	Seychelles	10.82	
37	2	Benson Okot	Uganda	10.85	
38	5	Oliver Mwimba	Democratic Republic of the Congo	10.86	
39	7	Patrice Esele Sasa	Democratic Republic of the Congo	10.88	
40	4	Hatago Murere	Namibia	10.91	
41	3	Nathan Abebe	Ethiopia	10.91	
42	4	Ojulu Kul	Ethiopia	10.93	
43	2	Jonathan Bardottier	Mauritius	10.95	
44	6	Didier Kiki	Benin	10.97	
45	5	Roméo Manzila	Republic of the Congo	10.97	
46	5	Ibrahim Diomande	Ivory Coast	10.98	
47	1	Gasisi Gegasa	Tanzania	11.00	
48	7	Ali Khamis Gulam	Tanzania	11.02	
49	2	Dylan Sicobo	Seychelles	11.06	
50	2	Dubien Espoir Badois	Republic of the Congo	11.30	
51	7	Arão Adão Simão	Angola	11.32	
52	5	Ayikoé Raymond Gabiam	Togo	11.41	
53	7	Tamba Djuma	Guinea-Bissau	11.55	
54	3	Indjai Braima Sissau	Guinea-Bissau	11.83	
55	2	Andres Silvano Eyi Ndong	Equatorial Guinea	11.98	
56	6	Natnael Gebregziabhier	Eritrea	14.49	
	2	Adem Musa	Ethiopia	DQ	TR16.8
	3	Dominique Lasconi Mulamba	Democratic Republic of the Congo	DQ	TR16.8

=== Semifinals ===
Held on 18 March
Qualification: First 2 in each semifinal (Q) and the next 2 fastest (q) advanced to the final.

Wind:
Heat 1: -0.7 m/s, Heat 2: -0.1 m/s, Heat 3: -2.1 m/s

Rank	Heat	Name	Nationality	Time	Notes
1	2	Emmanuel Eseme	Cameroon	10.23	Q
2	3	Usheoritse Itsekiri	Nigeria	10.29	Q
3	1	Consider Ekanem	Nigeria	10.37	Q
4	2	Benjamin Azamati	Ghana	10.41	Q
5	1	Barnabas Aggerh	Ghana	10.42	Q
6	3	Ebrahima Camara	The Gambia	10.45	Q
7	3	Gilbert Hainuca	Namibia	10.46	q
8	1	Noah Bibi	Mauritius	10.47	q
9	2	Israel Sunday	Nigeria	10.47	
10	2	Raphael Ngaguele Mberlina	Cameroon	10.52	
11	1	Claude Itoungue Bongogne	Cameroon	10.53	
12	2	Elvis Gaseb	Namibia	10.55	
13	1	Sarfo Ansah	Ghana	10.57	
14	3	Adama Jammeh	The Gambia	10.57	
15	2	Calvin Omphile	Botswana	10.59	
16	1	Kakene Sitali	Zambia	10.60	
17	1	Thuto Masasa	Botswana	10.62	
18	3	Ngoni Makusha	Zimbabwe	10.65	
19	2	Guy Maganga Gorra	Gabon	10.75	
20	2	Chakir Machmour	Morocco	10.75	
21	3	Orphee Topize	Mauritius	10.76	
22	1	Mwiinga Mweemba	Zambia	10.89	
	3	Justin Chivamba	Zambia	DQ	TR16.8
	3	Alieu Joof	The Gambia	DNS	

=== Final ===
Held on 19 March
Wind: -0.8 m/s

Rank	Lane	Name	Nationality	Time	Notes
1st place, gold medalist(s)	6	Emmanuel Eseme	Cameroon	10.14	
2nd place, silver medalist(s)	7	Usheoritse Itsekiri	Nigeria	10.23	
3rd place, bronze medalist(s)	2	Gilbert Hainuca	Namibia	10.29	
4	4	Consider Ekanem	Nigeria	10.42	
5	5	Benjamin Azamati	Ghana	10.45	
6	8	Barnabas Aggerh	Ghana	10.50	
7	9	Noah Bibi	Mauritius	10.50	
8	3	Ebrahima Camara	The Gambia	10.56	
