= Athletics at the 2019 Summer Universiade – Men's 4 × 100 metres relay =

The men's 4 × 100 metres relay event at the 2019 Summer Universiade was held on 12 and 13 July at the Stadio San Paolo in Naples.

== Medalists ==
Gold	Silver	Bronze
Japan; Daisuke Miyamoto; Yoshihiro Someya; Jun Yamashita; Bruno Dede	China; Jiang Jiehua; Jiang Hengnan; Wang Yu; Xuan Dajun	South Korea; Lee Gyu-hyeong; Ko Seung-hwan; Mo Il-hwan; Park Sie-young

== Results ==
=== Heats ===
Qualification: First 2 teams in each heat (Q) and the next 2 fastest (q) qualified for the final.

Rank	Heat	Nation	Athletes	Time	Notes
1	2	Japan	Daisuke Miyamoto, Yoshihiro Someya, Jun Yamashita, Bruno Dede	39.30	Q
2	2	South Korea	Lee Gyu-hyeong, Ko Seung-hwan, Mo Il-hwan, Park Sie-young	39.69	Q
3	3	Brazil	Erik Cardoso, Jonatan Rodrigues, Rodrigo do Nascimento, Paulo André de Oliveira	39.89	Q
4	2	Ghana	Wallace Aflamah, Benjamin Azamati-Kwaku, Sarfo Ansah, Barnabas Aggerh	40.04	q
5	1	China	Jiang Jiehua, Jiang Hengnan, Wang Yu, Xuan Dajun	40.04	Q
6	3	Chinese Taipei	Wei Yi-ching, Wang Wei-hsu, Wei Tai-sheng, Cheng Po-yu	40.19	Q
7	2	Czech Republic	Vojtěch Svoboda, Zdeněk Stromšík, Vojtěch Kolarčík, Dominik Záleský	40.20	q
8	3	Malaysia	Hafiz Jantan, Aqil Yasmin, Russel Nasir Taib, Johnathan Nyepa	40.28	
9	1	Kazakhstan	Vitaliy Zems, Damil Sutzhanov, Sergey Russak, Alexandr Kasper	40.35	Q
10	2	Mexico	Adrián Rivera, Juan Carlos Alanis, César Ramírez, Iván Eduardo Moreno	40.37	
11	3	India	Gurindervir Singh, Harjit Singh, Muhammed Variyathodi, Vadivelu Kannadasan	40.73	
12	3	Italy	Angelo Marvulli, Simone Tanzilli, Pietro Pivotto, Luca Antonio Cassano	40.77	
13	1	Romania	Cristian Radu, Alexandru Terpezan, Vlad Dulcescu, Ioan Andrei Melnicescu	41.98	
14	2	Sri Lanka	Himihami Mudiyanselage, Malin Wijaya Krishna, Gihan Ranaweera, Araliya Kottahachchi	42.13	
15	2	Oman	Sulaiyam Al-Sulaimi, Usama Al-Gheilani, Saif Al-Maqbali, Majid Al-Maqbali	43.20	
	3	South Africa	Jon Seeliger, Thembo Monareng, Zakhithi Nene, Chederick van Wyk	DNF	
	1	Thailand	Ruttanapon Sowan, Nutthapong Veeravongratanasiri, Chayut Khongprasit, Siripol Punpa	DQ	R170.7
	1	Uganda	Joshua Jagalo, Emmanuel Nuwagaba, Yahaya Maliamungu, Benson Okot	DQ	R163.3a
	1	Indonesia		DNS	
	3	Saudi Arabia		DNS	

=== Final ===
Rank	Lane	Nation	Athletes	Time	Notes
1st place, gold medalist(s)	4	Japan	Daisuke Miyamoto, Yoshihiro Someya, Jun Yamashita, Bruno Dede	38.92	
2nd place, silver medalist(s)	3	China	Jiang Jiehua, Jiang Hengnan, Wang Yu, Xuan Dajun	39.01	
3rd place, bronze medalist(s)	6	South Korea	Lee Gyu-hyeong, Ko Seung-hwan, Mo Il-hwan, Park Sie-young	39.31	
4	7	Chinese Taipei	Wei Yi-ching, Wang Wei-hsu, Wei Tai-sheng, Cheng Po-yu	39.78	
5	8	Kazakhstan	Vitaliy Zems, Damil Sutzhanov, Sergey Russak, Alexandr Kasper	40.00	
6	2	Czech Republic	Vojtěch Svoboda, Zdeněk Stromšík, Vojtěch Kolarčík, Dominik Záleský	40.54	
7	5	Brazil	Gabriel Constantino, Jonatan Rodrigues, Rodrigo do Nascimento, Paulo André de Oliveira	1:23.05	
	1	Ghana	Wallace Aflamah, Benjamin Azamati-Kwaku, Sarfo Ansah, Barnabas Aggerh	DQ	R170.19
