= Athletics at the 2023 African Games – Men's 4 × 100 metres relay =

The men's 4 × 100 metres relay event at the 2023 African Games was held on 19 and 20 March 2024 in Accra, Ghana.

== Medalists ==
Gold	Silver	Bronze
Nigeria; Israel Okon Sunday; Consider Ekanem; Alaba Akintola; Usheoritse Itsekiri; Edose Ibadin*	Ghana; Edwin Gadayi; Benjamin Azamati; Solomon Hammond; Joseph Amoah	Liberia; John Sherman; Emmanuel Matadi; Jabez Reeves; Joseph Fahnbulleh

*Athletes who competed in heats only

== Results ==
=== Heats ===
Qualification: First 2 teams of each heat (Q) plus the next 2 fastest (q) qualified for the final.

Rank	Heat	Nation	Athletes	Time	Notes
1	2	Ghana	Edwin Gadayi, Benjamin Azamati, Solomon Kweku, Joseph Amoah	38.67	Q
2	3	Nigeria	Israel Okon Sunday, Consider Ekanem, Alaba Akintola, Edose Ibadin	38.70	Q
3	2	Liberia	John Sherman, Emmanuel Matadi, Jabez Reeves, Joseph Fahnbulleh	38.86	Q
4	1	The Gambia	Sengan Jobe, Adama Jammeh, Kebba Makkalo, Ebrahima Camara	39.33	Q
5	1	Botswana	Thapelo Monaiwa, Thuto Masasa, Jayson Mandoze, Calvin Omphile	39.52	Q
6	3	Zambia	Justice Chivwamba, Kakene Sitali, Mweemba Mwiinga, Malambo Choongo	39.56	Q
7	2	Zimbabwe	Dickson Kamungeremu, Gerren Muwishi, Zuze Leeford, Ngoni Makusha	39.90	q
8	3	Kenya	Hebsborn Ochieng, Samuel Waweru, Steve Onyango, Dan Kiviasi Asamba	39.93	q
9	1	Cameroon	Appolinaire Yinra, Raphael Ngaguele Mberlina, Claude Itoungue Bongogne, Emmanuel Eseme	39.96	
10	3	Namibia	Sherman Du Plessis, Elvis Gaseb, Hatago Murere, Gilbert Hainuca	40.20	
11	1	Mauritius	Daniel Lozereau, Jonathan Bardottier, Joshan Vencatasamy, Noah Bibi	40.51	
12	1	Democratic Republic of the Congo	Olivier Mwimba, Patrice Esele, Kanyinda Mulunda Mardoche, Dominique Mulamba	40.57	NR
13	1	Seychelles	Janosh Moncherry, Sharry Dodin, Denzel Adem, Caleb Vadivello	41.34	
14	2	Ethiopia	Ojulu Kul, Adem Musa, Mintesnot Wolde, Nathan Abebe	41.77	
15	3	Republic of the Congo	Amara Drame, Niamba Mboko, Sympho Ndouniama, Roméo Manzila	41.92	
	2	Ivory Coast	Gnamien Nehemie N'goran, Ibrahim Diomande, Jean Mark Allokoua, Arthur Cissé	DNF	
	2	Togo	Komi Bernard Konu, Ayikoé Raymond Gabiam, Kodjo Clément Bledje, Kossi Médard Nayo	DNF	
	3	Uganda	Emmanuel Aboda, Pius Adome, Allan Ngobi, Benson Okot	DQ	TR7.1

=== Final ===
Rank	Lane	Nation	Athletes	Time	Notes
1st place, gold medalist(s)	3	Nigeria	Israel Okon Sunday, Consider Ekanem, Alaba Akintola, Usheoritse Itsekiri	38.41	
2nd place, silver medalist(s)	6	Ghana	Edwin Gadayi, Benjamin Azamati, Solomon Hammond, Joseph Amoah	38.43	
3rd place, bronze medalist(s)	5	Liberia	John Sherman, Emmanuel Matadi, Jabez Reeves, Joseph Fahnbulleh	38.73	NR
4	7	Botswana	Thapelo Monaiwa, Thuto Masasa, Jayson Mandoze, Calvin Omphile	39.19	
5	4	The Gambia	Sengan Jobe, Adama Jammeh, Kebba Makkalo, Ebrahima Camara	39.24	NR
6	8	Zimbabwe	Dickson Kamungeremu, Gerren Muwishi, Zuze Leeford, Ngoni Makusha	39.74	
7	2	Zambia	Justice Chivwamba, Kakene Sitali, Mweemba Mwiinga, Malambo Choongo	39.76	
8	1	Kenya	Hebsborn Ochieng, Samuel Waweru, Steve Onyango, Dan Kiviasi Asamba	39.96	
