= Dylan Sicobo =

Seychellois sprinter (born 1997)

Personal information
- Born: 27 February 1997 (age 29) Victoria, Seychelles
- Height: 1.80 m (5 ft 11 in)
- Weight: 72 kg (159 lb)

Sport
- Sport: Athletics
- Events: 100 m, 200 m

Dylan Sicobo (born 27 February 1997) is a Seychellois sprinter. He represented his country at the 2017 World Championships and 2018 World Indoor Championships without advancing from the first round. He also won the gold medal in the 100 metres at the 2017 Jeux de la Francophonie. He was the Seychelles sportsman of the year in 2017.

== International competitions ==
Year	Competition	Venue	Position	Event	Notes
Representing Seychelles
2014	African Championships	Marrakesh, Morocco	42nd (h)	100 m	11.22
2014	African Championships	Marrakesh, Morocco	43rd (h)	200 m	22.47
2014	African Championships	Marrakesh, Morocco	8th (h)	4 × 100 m relay	41.86^{1}
2015	African Junior Championships	Addis Ababa, Ethiopia	8th	100 m	11.04
2015	African Junior Championships	Addis Ababa, Ethiopia	17th (h)	200 m	22.23
2015	African Junior Championships	Addis Ababa, Ethiopia	9th (h)	4 × 100 m relay	42.46
2016	African Championships	Durban, South Africa	29th (h)	100 m	10.89
2016	World U20 Championships	Bydgoszcz, Poland	29th (h)	100 m	10.79
2017	Jeux de la Francophonie	Abidjan, Ivory Coast	1st	100 m	10.33
2017	Jeux de la Francophonie	Abidjan, Ivory Coast	3rd	4 × 100 m relay	40.31
2017	World Championships	London, United Kingdom	18th (p)	100 m	11.01
2018	World Indoor Championships	Birmingham, United Kingdom	29th (h)	60 m	6.82
2018	Commonwealth Games	Gold Coast, Australia	41st (h)	100 m	10.74
2018	African Championships	Asaba, Nigeria	29th (h)	100 m	10.90
2019	African Games	Rabat, Morocco	21st (sf)	100 m	10.80
2022	African Championships	Port Louis, Mauritius	36th (h)	100 m	10.70
2023	Jeux de la Francophonie	Kinshasa, Democratic Republic of the Congo	25th (h)	100 m	11.12
2024	African Games	Accra, Ghana	49th (h)	100 m	11.06
2024	African Games	Accra, Ghana	13th (h)	4 × 100 m relay	41.34
2024	African Championships	Douala, Cameroon	38th (h)	100 m	10.63
2024	African Championships	Douala, Cameroon	41st (h)	200 m	22.21
2024	Olympic Games	Paris, France	66th (h)	100 m	10.62
2025	World Championships	Tokyo, Japan	56th (h)	100 m	10.85

^{1}Did not start in the final

== Personal bests ==
Outdoor

- 100 metres – 10.33 (+0.9 m/s, Abidjan 2017) NR
- 200 metres – 21.77 (NWI, Réduit 2016)

Indoor

- 60 metres – 6.82 (Birmingham 2018) NR

Olympic Games
Preceded by Rodney Govinden; Felicity Passon	Flag bearer for Seychelles; Paris 2024 with Khema Elizabeth	Succeeded by Incumbent
