= Ngoni Makusha =

Zimbabwean sprinter (born 1994)

Personal information
- Full name: Ngoni Methukhela Makusha
- Born: 29 June 1994 (age 32) Chitungwiza, Zimbabwe
- Height: 1.78 m (5 ft 10 in)
- Weight: 73 kg (161 lb)

Sport
- Sport: Athletics
- Event(s): 100 m, 200 m
Medal record
Men's athletics
Representing Zimbabwe
African Championships
Bronze medal – third place	2022 Mauritius	4×100 m

Ngoni Methukhela Makusha (born 26 June 1994) is a Zimbabwean sprinter. He finished sixth in the 100 metres at the 2018 African Championships. In addition, he represented his country at the 2019 World Relays.He is the 2018 Southern region Championships champion in the 100m and 200m He is a bronze medalist in the 4×100m Relay held in Mauritius 2022

Makusha competed for the Florida State Seminoles track and field team in the NCAA. He won the 2011 Bowerman Award.

== International competitions ==
Year	Competition	Venue	Position	Event	Notes
Representing Zimbabwe
2016	African Championships	Durban, South Africa	27th (h)	100 m	10.80
2016	African Championships	Durban, South Africa	23rd (sf)	200 m	21.98
2016	African Championships	Durban, South Africa	8th	4 × 100 m relay	41.02
2018	African Championships	Asaba, Nigeria	6th	100 m	10.45
2018	African Championships	Asaba, Nigeria	9th (sf)	200 m	20.94
2018	African Championships	Asaba, Nigeria	4th	4 × 100 m relay	39.37
2019	World Relays	Yokohama, Japan	–	4 × 100 m relay	DQ
2019	African Games	Rabat, Morocco	13th (sf)	100 m	10.54
2019	African Games	Rabat, Morocco	16th (sf)	200 m	21.08
2019	African Games	Rabat, Morocco	6th	4 × 100 m relay	39.82
2021	World Relays	Chorzów, Poland	16th (h)	4 × 100 m relay	40.54
2021	Olympic Games	Tokyo, Japan	50th (h)	100 m	10.43
2022	African Championships	Port Louis, Mauritius	11th (sf)	100 m	10.29
2022	African Championships	Port Louis, Mauritius	19th (sf)	200 m	21.32
2022	African Championships	Port Louis, Mauritius	3rd	4 × 100 m relay	39.81
2024	African Games	Accra, Ghana	18th (sf)	100 m	10.65
2024	African Games	Accra, Ghana	16th (sf)	200 m	21.25
2024	African Games	Accra, Ghana	6th	4 × 100 m relay	39.74
2024	African Championships	Douala, Cameroon	29th (h)	100 m	10.55
2024	African Championships	Douala, Cameroon	16th (sf)	200 m	21.45
2024	African Championships	Douala, Cameroon	–	4 × 100 m relay	DNF

== Personal bests ==
Outdoor

- 100 metres – 10.17 (+0.3 m/s, Réduit 2018)
- 200 metres – 20.49 (+1.2 m/s, Pretoria 2019)
