= 2018 IAAF World Indoor Championships – Men's 60 metres =

Men's 60 metres at the 2018 IAAF World Indoor Championships
- Venue: Arena Birmingham
- Dates: 3 March
- Competitors: 52 from 43 nations
- Winning time: 6.37 CR

Medalists
gold medal	Christian Coleman	United States
silver medal	Su Bingtian	China
bronze medal	Ronnie Baker	United States

Video on YouTube Official Video

The men's 60 metres at the 2018 IAAF World Indoor Championships took place on 3 March 2018.

== Summary ==
Fifteen years after his first silver medal, remarkable 43-year-old Kim Collins returned to yet another World Championship, qualifying for the semi-final round, but he did not start. The favorite in the event was Christian Coleman, just two weeks after his second world record in this event this season. While two American athletes qualifying for the final is not uncommon, two Chinese athletes qualifying for the final might be the sign of a new trend.

In the final, Coleman was out fast, but next to him in the center of the track Su Bingtian was out with him. Ján Volko and Emre Zafer Barnes were also out fast, but faded quickly. Giving ground at the beginning, Ronnie Baker hit his top speed mid-race, about the same time as Coleman reached his. Coleman managed a little separation from Su, while Baker was making up lost ground. Su continued to press Coleman to the line, but Coleman finished strongly with a lean for a metre victory. Su barely held off the fast closing Baker to take the first global medal for a Chinese sprinter. Behind the medalists, Zhenye Xie gave China a 2-4 punch as he barely held off the last to fifth explosion by Hassan Taftian.

Coleman's winning time of 6.37 would have been the world record prior to his other efforts this season. Su improved upon his own Asian record, his third consecutive national record at the World Indoor Championships.

== Results ==
=== Heats ===
The heats were started at 10:15.

Rank	Heat	Lane	Name	Nationality	Time	Notes
1	7	4	Ronnie Baker	United States	6.57	Q
2	4	4	Emre Zafer Barnes	Turkey	6.58	Q
3	2	4	Su Bingtian	China	6.58	Q
4	5	5	Chijindu Ujah	Great Britain	6.59	Q
5	7	3	Abdullah Abkar Mohammed	Saudi Arabia	6.62	Q
6	4	2	Xie Zhenye	China	6.62	Q
7	6	7	Ben Youssef Meïté	Ivory Coast	6.63	Q
8	6	6	Remigiusz Olszewski	Poland	6.65	Q
9	5	8	Arthur Cissé	Ivory Coast	6.66	Q
10	3	7	Ján Volko	Slovakia	6.66	Q
11	5	1	Sean Safo-Antwi	Ghana	6.66	Q
12	6	4	Everton Clarke	Jamaica	6.70	Q
13	2	8	Warren Fraser	Bahamas	6.71	Q
14	5	4	Ángel David Rodríguez	Spain	6.71	q
15	2	7	Kimmari Roach	Jamaica	6.71	Q
16	1	6	Christian Coleman	United States	6.71	Q
17	6	3	Tosin Ogunode	Qatar	6.72	q
18	4	8	Michael Pohl	Germany	6.73	Q
19	3	3	Hassan Taftian	Iran	6.74	Q
20	3	2	Dominik Záleský	Czech Republic	6.74	Q
21	4	6	Andrew Robertson	Great Britain	6.74	q
22	1	7	Odain Rose	Sweden	6.75	Q
23	2	6	Peter Emelieze	Germany	6.77	
24	1	4	Kim Collins	Saint Kitts and Nevis	6.77	Q
25	7	7	Jean-Yann de Grace	Mauritius	6.78	Q
26	2	2	Keston Bledman	Trinidad and Tobago	6.79	
27	3	4	Emmanuel Callender	Trinidad and Tobago	6.80	SB
28	7	8	Eric Cray	Philippines	6.81	
29	6	5	Dylan Sicobo	Seychelles	6.82	NR
30	7	2	Sibusiso Matsenjwa	Swaziland	6.82	NR
31	5	3	Ambdoul Karim Riffayn	Comoros	6.88	
32	3	6	Sydney Siame	Zambia	6.88	
33	4	5	Lester Ryan	Montserrat	6.90	PB
34	5	7	Shaun Gill	Belize	6.96	PB
35	4	1	Christophe Boulos	Lebanon	6.99	
36	6	2	Nazmie-Lee Marai	Papua New Guinea	7.01	PB
37	2	5	Juan Carlos Rodríguez	El Salvador	7.03	NR
38	1	8	Jonah Harris	Nauru	7.03	NR
39	6	1	Umar Khayam Hameed	Pakistan	7.06	
40	5	6	Nick Joseph	Saint Lucia	7.07	PB
41	6	8	Adel Sesay	Sierra Leone	7.08	
42	1	5	Jacob El Aida	Malta	7.09	
43	4	3	Francesco Molinari	San Marino	7.17	
44	2	3	Holder da Silva	Guinea-Bissau	7.20	SB
45	4	7	Paul Ma'unikeni	Solomon Islands	7.32	PB
46	3	8	Alvin Marvin Martin	Federated States of Micronesia	7.34	PB
47	3	5	Austin Hamilton	Sweden	7.35	
48	1	3	Zdeněk Stromšík	Czech Republic	7.41	
49	5	2	Karalo Hepoiteloto Maibuca	Tuvalu	7.47	NR
	1	2	Kemar Hyman	Cayman Islands	DQ	162.8
	7	5	Andrew Fisher	Bahrain	DNS	
	7	6	Abdur Rouf	Bangladesh	DNS	

=== Semifinal ===
The semifinals were started at 19:11.

Rank	Heat	Lane	Name	Nationality	Time	Notes
1	2	3	Christian Coleman	United States	6.45	Q
2	3	4	Ronnie Baker	United States	6.52	Q
3	1	6	Su Bingtian	China	6.52	Q
4	2	5	Xie Zhenye	China	6.57	Q
5	3	8	Hassan Taftian	Iran	6.57	Q
6	3	3	Ján Volko	Slovakia	6.58	q
7	2	4	Emre Zafer Barnes	Turkey	6.58	q
8	1	8	Sean Safo-Antwi	Ghana	6.59	Q, SB
9	1	3	Arthur Cissé	Ivory Coast	6.59	
10	2	6	Ben Youssef Meïté	Ivory Coast	6.59	
11	1	7	Everton Clarke	Jamaica	6.63	
12	3	6	Abdullah Abkar Mohammed	Saudi Arabia	6.63	
13	3	1	Andrew Robertson	Great Britain	6.63	
14	2	7	Kimmari Roach	Jamaica	6.65	
15	1	5	Remigiusz Olszewski	Poland	6.65	
16	3	5	Warren Fraser	Bahamas	6.66	SB
17	3	2	Dominik Záleský	Czech Republic	6.67	
18	1	2	Ángel David Rodríguez	Spain	6.67	
19	3	7	Michael Pohl	Germany	6.71	
20	2	8	Odain Rose	Sweden	6.74	
21	2	1	Tosin Ogunode	Qatar	6.77	
22	1	1	Jean-Yann de Grace	Mauritius	6.83	
	1	4	Chijindu Ujah	Great Britain	DQ	162.8
	2	2	Kim Collins	Saint Kitts and Nevis	DNS	

=== Final ===
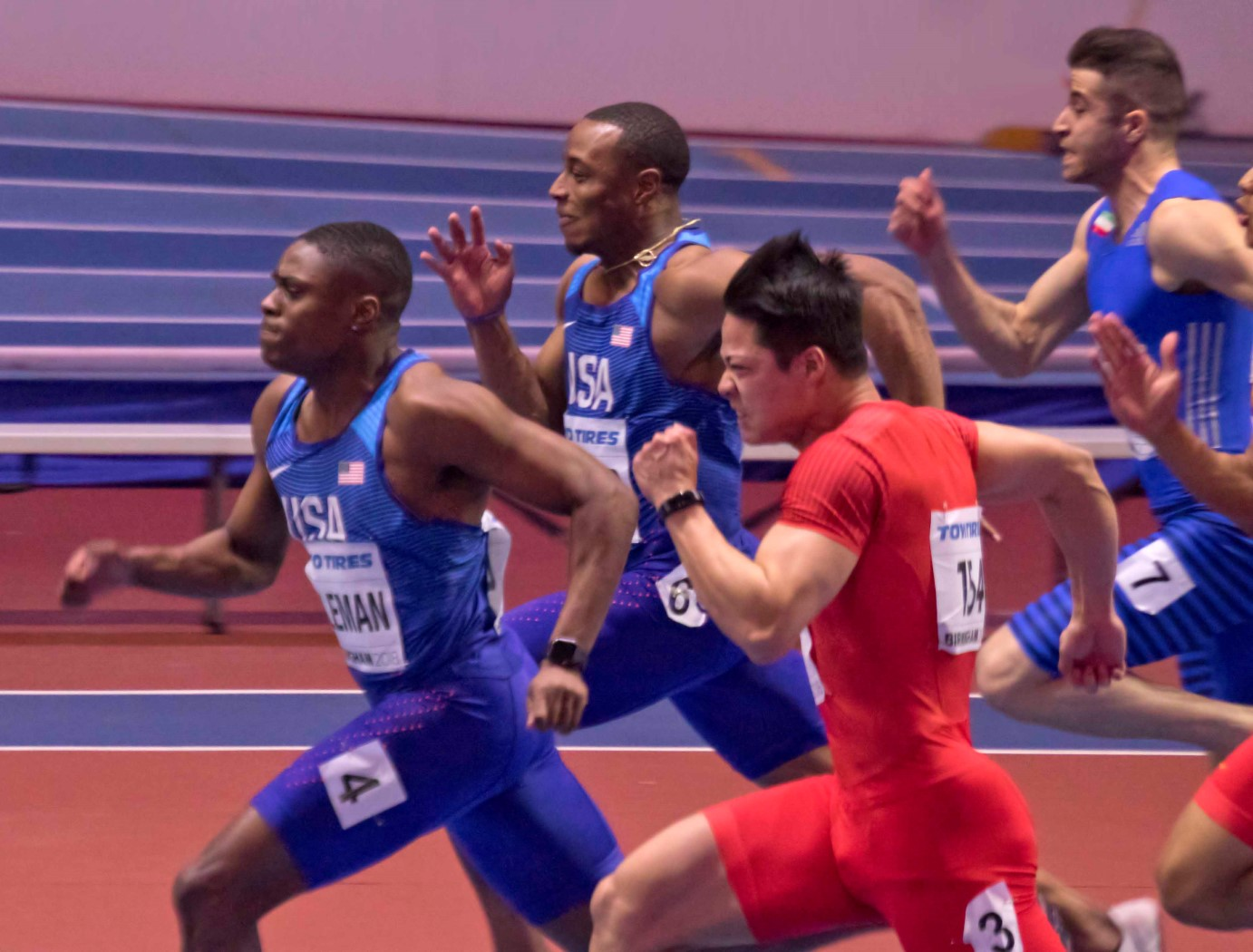
Christian Coleman winning the final

The final was started at 21:09.

Rank	Lane	Name	Nationality	Time	Notes
1st place, gold medalist(s)	4	Christian Coleman	United States	6.37	CR
2nd place, silver medalist(s)	3	Su Bingtian	China	6.42	AIR
3rd place, bronze medalist(s)	6	Ronnie Baker	United States	6.44	
4	5	Xie Zhenye	China	6.52	PB
5	7	Hassan Taftian	Iran	6.53	
6	1	Ján Volko	Slovakia	6.59	
7	8	Sean Safo-Antwi	Ghana	6.60	
8	2	Emre Zafer Barnes	Turkey	6.64	
