= Mike Nyang'au =

Kenyan sprinter

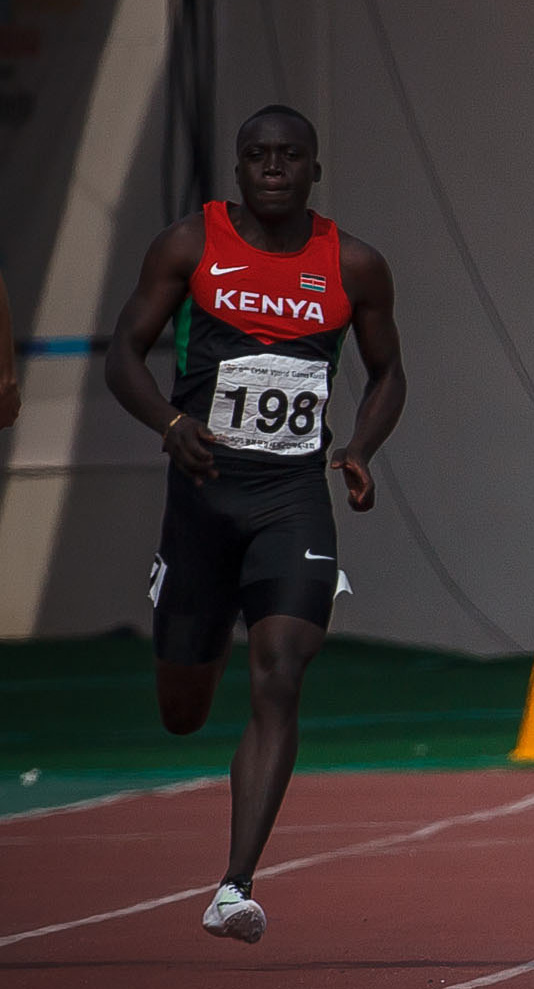
- Mike Mokamba Nyang'au at the 2015 Military World Games
Medal record
Men's athletics
Representing Kenya
African Championships
Gold medal – first place	2022 Mauritius	4×100 m

Mike Mokamba Nyang'au (born August 28, 1994) is a Kenyan sprinter.

Mokamba set a national record for Kenya in the 100 meters in winning the 2015 national championships.

In the 200 meters Mokamba obtained a qualifying time for the 2015 World Championships in Athletics. He ultimately was named to the Kenyan team for that event.

== Competition record ==
Year	Competition	Venue	Position	Event	Notes
Representing Kenya
2011	African Junior Championships	Gaborone, Botswana	7th	100 m	11.03
2011	African Junior Championships	Gaborone, Botswana	10th (sf)	200 m	21.95
2011	African Junior Championships	Gaborone, Botswana	5th	4 × 100 m relay	43.03
2011	World Youth Championships	Lille, France	17th (sf)	200 m	21.62
2012	World Junior Championships	Barcelona, Spain	28th (h)	100 m	10.70
2013	World Championships	Moscow, Russia	23rd (h)	4 × 400 m relay	3:06.29
2015	World Relays	Nassau, Bahamas	–	4 × 200 m relay	DQ
2015	World Championships	Beijing, China	31st (h)	200 m	20.51
2015	Military World Games	Mungyeong, South Korea	12th (sf)	100 m	10.76
2015	Military World Games	Mungyeong, South Korea	8th	200 m	21.16
2015	Military World Games	Mungyeong, South Korea	8th	4 × 100 m relay	40.58
2016	African Championships	Durban, South Africa	27th (h)	200 m	21.83
2017	World Relays	Nassau, Bahamas	7th	4 × 200 m relay	1:23.72
2018	Commonwealth Games	Gold Coast, Australia	26th (h)	200 m	21.14
2018	Commonwealth Games	Gold Coast, Australia	6th (h)	4 × 400 m relay	3:13.52
2018	African Championships	Asaba, Nigeria	27th (h)	200 m	21.64
2018	African Championships	Asaba, Nigeria	5th	4 × 100 m relay	39.77
2019	World Relays	Yokohama, Japan	4th	4 × 200 m relay	1:22.55
2019	African Games	Rabat, Morocco	8th	200 m	21.05
2019	African Games	Rabat, Morocco	11th (h)	4 × 100 m relay	41.28
2019	African Games	Rabat, Morocco	4th	4 × 400 m relay	3:05.71
2021	World Relays	Chorzów, Poland	2nd	4 × 200 m relay	1:24.26
2022	African Championships	St Pierre, Mauritius	11th (sf)	200 m	21.06
2022	African Championships	St Pierre, Mauritius	1st	4 × 100 m relay	39.28
2022	African Championships	St Pierre, Mauritius	4th	4 × 400 m relay	3:09.49
2024	African Championships	Douala, Cameroon	40th (h)	200 m	22.04
2024	African Championships	Douala, Cameroon	5th	4 × 100 m relay	40.11
