= Guy Maganga Gorra =

Gabonese sprinter (born 1993)

Guy Maganga
Personal information
- Full name: Guy Maganga Gorra
- Born: 18 March 1993 (age 33) Port-Gentil, Ogooué-Maritime, Gabon

Sport
- Sport: Athletics
- Events: 100 m, 200 m

Guy Maganga Gorra (born 18 March 1993) is a Gabonese sprinter. He finished fourth in the 200 metres at the 2019 African Games. He was selected for the 2019 World Championships in Doha as well as the 2020 Summer Games.

He holds the national records in the 200 metres, both indoors and outdoors.

He was part of Gabon's team at the 2020 Summer Olympics together with sibling swimmers Adam and Aya Girard de Langlade Mpali.

== International competitions ==
Year	Competition	Venue	Position	Event	Notes
Representing Gabon
2017	Jeux de la Francophonie	Abidjan, Ivory Coast	13th (h)	100 m	10.69
2017	Jeux de la Francophonie	Abidjan, Ivory Coast	9th (h)	200 m	21.41
2019	African Games	Rabat, Morocco	25th (h)	100 m	10.65
2019	African Games	Rabat, Morocco	4th	200 m	20.77
2019	World Championships	Doha, Qatar	35th (h)	200 m	20.74
2021	Olympic Games	Tokyo, Japan	57th (h)	100 m	10.77
2022	African Championships	Port Louis, Mauritius	22nd (h)	100 m	10.47
2022	African Championships	Port Louis, Mauritius	14th (sf)	200 m	21.12
2022	World Championships	Eugene, United States	19th (sf)	200 m	20.65
2023	Jeux de la Francophonie	Kinshasa, DR Congo	3rd	200 m	20.64
2023	World Championships	Budapest, Hungary	44th (h)	200 m	21.04
2024	African Games	Accra, Ghana	19th (sf)	100 m	10.75
2024	African Games	Accra, Ghana	11th (sf)	200 m	21.10
2026	African Championships	Accra, Ghana	8th	200 m	21.47
2026	Commonwealth Games	Glasgow, United Kingdom	22nd (sf)	200 m	21.10

== Personal bests ==
Outdoor

- 100 metres – 10.30 (+1.5 m/s, Lynchburg 2019)
- 200 metres – 20.37 (+1.2 m/s, Thonon-les-Bains 2025) NR
- 400 metres – 46.60 (High Point 2021)

Indoor

- 60 metres – 6.84 (Nantes 2019)
- 200 metres – 21.02 (Lynchburg 2021) NR
