= Gilbert Hainuca =

Namibian sprinter (born 1994)

Personal information
- Nationality: Namibian
- Born: 12 March 1994 (age 32)

Sport
- Sport: Athletics
- Event: Sprinting

Gilbert Hainuca (born 12 March 1994) is a Namibian sprinter. He won the bronze medal in the 100 metres at the 2024 African Games in Accra, Ghana.

== International competitions ==
Year	Competition	Venue	Position	Event	Notes
Representing Namibia
2013	African Junior Championships	Bambous, Mauritius	6th (h)	100 m	11.10^{1}
2015	World Relays	Nassau, Bahamas	–	4 × 200 m relay	DQ
2018	African Championships	Asaba, Nigeria	7th	100 m	10.49
2019	African Games	Rabat, Morocco	–	100 m	DQ
2019	African Games	Rabat, Morocco	10th (h)	4 × 100 m relay	41.03
2022	African Championships	Port Louis, Mauritius	4th (sf)	100 m	10.15^{1}
2022	African Championships	Port Louis, Mauritius	20th (sf)	200 m	21.60
2022	Commonwealth Games	Birmingham, United Kingdom	12th (sf)	100 m	10.29
2024	African Games	Accra, Ghana	3rd	100 m	10.29
2024	African Games	Accra, Ghana	9th (sf)	200 m	21.05
2024	African Games	Accra, Ghana	10th (h)	4 × 100 m relay	40.20
2024	African Championships	Douala, Cameroon	26th (h)	100 m	10.53
2024	African Championships	Douala, Cameroon	4th	4 × 100 m relay	39.82

^{1}Disqualified in the final

== Personal bests ==
Outdoor

- 60 metres – 6.60 (+0.6 m/s, Windhoek 2021)
- 100 metres – 10.16 (+1.7 m/s, Sasolburg 2022)
- 200 metres – 20.91 (-0.1 m/s, Windhoek 2023)
