= Mehdi Takordmioui =

Moroccan sprinter (born 1995)

Personal information
- Native name: تقرضميون المهدي
- Nationality: Morocco
- Born: 3 August 1995 (age 30)

Sport
- Sport: Athletics
- Events: 200 metres, 100 metres
- Club: Wydad AC

Achievements and titles
- National finals: 2019 Moroccan Champs; • 100m, 1st (gold); • 200m, 1st (gold)
- Personal bests: 100m: 10.34 (+1.8) (2019); 200m: 20.68 (+0.9) (2019)
Medal record
Men's athletics
Representing Morocco
Arab Championships
Bronze medal – third place	2019 Cairo	100 m
Gold medal – first place	2019 Cairo	200 m

Mehdi Takordmioui (Arabic: تقرضميون المهدي; born 3 August 1995) is a Moroccan sprinter. He is a two-time national champion, and he won the gold medal in the 200 m at the 2019 Arab Athletics Championships.

== Biography ==
Takordmioui's first international competition was in 2019, representing Morocco at the 2019 Arab Athletics Championships in Cairo, Egypt. He earned two medals at the championships—a bronze in the 100 m behind Abdo Barka and Andrew Fisher, and a gold in the 200 m. Takordmioui made his Diamond League debut at the 2019 Meeting International Mohammed VI d'Athlétisme de Rabat, finishing 8th in the 200 m with a time of 21.13.

Takordmioui won his first national titles at the 2019 Moroccan Athletics Championships, in both the 100 m and 200 m. His time of 10.34 seconds in the 100 m served as a personal best.

Takordmioui competed in Athletics at the 2019 African Games, in both the 100 m and 200 m. In the 100 m, he advanced into the semifinals but was then disqualified for a false start. In the 200 m, Takordmioui finished 7th in his semifinal and did not qualify for the finals.

In 2021, Takordmioui was named to the Moroccan team for the 2021 Arab Athletics Championships in the 100 m and 200 m, along with Chakir Machmour. In the 100 m, he finished 8th in the finals, while in the 200 m he finished 3rd in his heat and did not qualify for the finals. In the 200 metres at the 2021 Islamic Solidarity Games, Takordmioui qualified for the semi-finals but finished 5th in his semi and did not make the finals again.

Takordmioui was also invited to the 2022 Rabat Diamond League, where he finished 8th in the 200 m.

Takordmioui competes in the sport of athletics division for the Wydad AC club.

== Statistics ==
=== Personal bests ===
Event	Mark	Place	Competition	Venue	Date
100 metres	10.34 (+1.8 m/s)	1st place, gold medalist(s)	Moroccan Athletics Championships	Salé, Morocco	27 July 2019
200 metres	20.68 (+0.9 m/s)	1h2	Arab Athletics Championships	Cairo, Egypt	8 April 2019
