= Sean Safo-Antwi =

Ghanaian sprinter (born 1990)

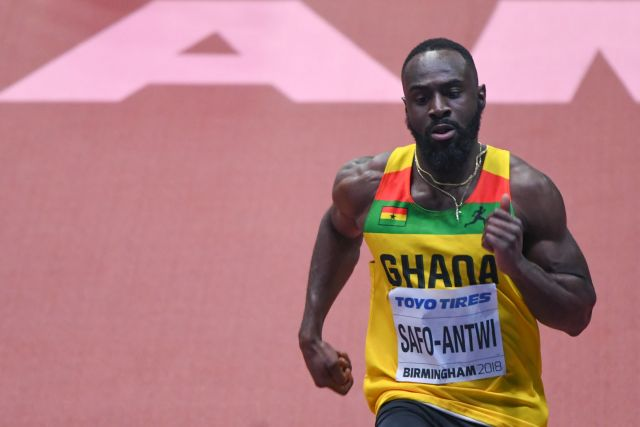
- Safo-Antwi at the 2018 World Indoor Championships

Personal information
- Born: 31 October 1990 (age 35) London, England
- Height: 1.80 m (5 ft 11 in)
- Weight: 85 kg (187 lb)

Sport
- Country: Ghana
- Sport: Track and field
- Events: 60 metres, 100 metres
- Club: Enfield and Haringey Athletic Club
- Coached by: Jonas Tawiah-Dodoo (2012–)

Sean Safo-Antwi (born 31 October 1990 in London) is a Ghanaian sprinter. He competed for Great Britain before switching allegiance to Ghana in early 2016, a move that the British Federation did not oppose. He was due to represent Ghana for the first time at the 2016 World Indoor Championships but was withdrawn at the last minute. In 2016 he represented Ghana in the 100 metres at the 2016 Summer Olympics in Rio de Janeiro, Brazil.

He competed for Ghana at the 2020 Summer Olympics in the men's 4 x 100 metres relay.

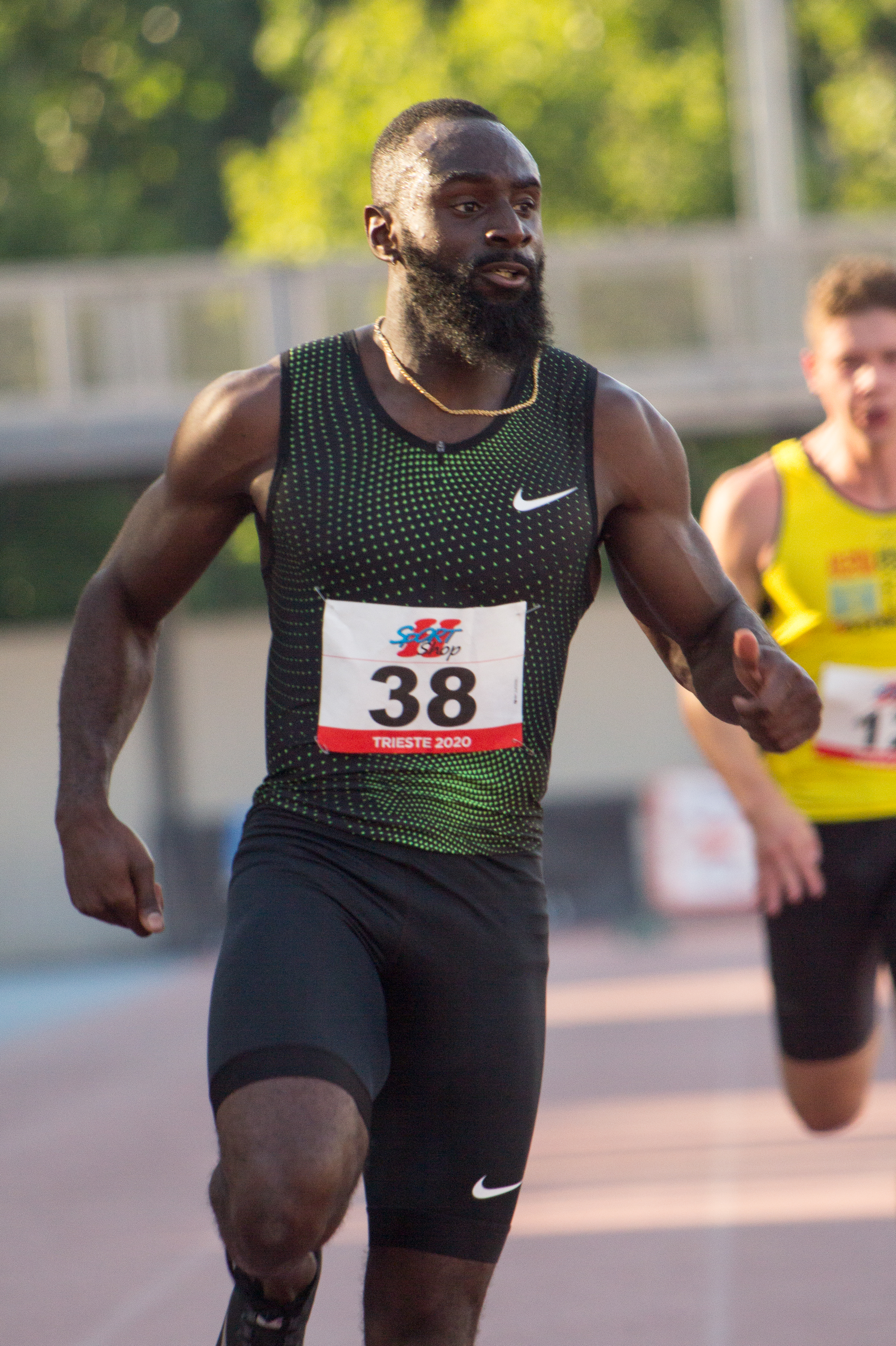
Sean Safo-Antwi at the 2020 Triveneto Meeting in Trieste

== Competition record ==
Year	Competition	Venue	Position	Event	Notes
Representing Great Britain
2015	European Indoor Championships	Prague, Czech Republic	9th (sf)	60 m	6.63
2015	World Relays	Nassau, Bahamas	9th (h)	4 × 100 m relay	38.79
Representing Ghana
2016	Olympic Games	Rio de Janeiro, Brazil	57th (h)	100 m	10.43
2018	World Indoor Championships	Birmingham, United Kingdom	7th	60 m	6.60
2018	Commonwealth Games	Gold Coast, Australia	50th (h)	100 m	10.95
2019	African Games	Rabat, Morocco	5th	100 m	10.18
2019	African Games	Rabat, Morocco	1st	4 × 100 m relay	38.30
2019	World Championships	Doha, Qatar	13th (h)	4 × 100 m relay	38.24
2021	World Relays	Chorzów, Poland	6th (h)	4 × 100 m relay	38.79^{1}
2021	Olympic Games	Tokyo, Japan	7th (h)	4 × 100 m relay	38.08 (NR)^{1}
2022	World Indoor Championships	Belgrade, Serbia	33rd (h)	60 m	6.71
2022	African Championships	Port Louis, Mauritius	14th (sf)	100 m	10.31
2022	World Championships	Eugene, United States	5th	4 × 100 m relay	38.07
2022	2022 Commonwealth Games	Birmingham, United Kingdom	16th (SF)	100 m	10.36
2022	2022 Commonwealth Games	Birmingham, United Kingdom	DQ	4 × 100 m	TR 24.11
2025	World Athletics Relays	Guangzhou, China	13th (h)	4 × 100 m relay	38.49 SB

^{1}Disqualified in the final

== Personal bests ==
Outdoor

- 100 metres – 10.12 (+1.8 m/s, London 2022)
- 200 metres – 20.76 (+0.3 m/s, Newham 2016)

Indoor

- 60 metres – 6.55 (Mondeville 2016)
