= Barnabas Aggerh =

Ghanaian athlete (born 1998)

Personal information
- Born: 4 June 1998 (age 28)

Sport
- Sport: Athletics
- Event: Sprint

Achievements and titles
- Personal best: 60 m: 6.52 s (2025)

Barnabas Aggerh (born 4 June 1998) is a Ghanaian sprinter.

== Career ==
He competed at the 2019 Summer Universiade in Naples. He ran for Ghana in the 4 × 100 m relay at the 2022 Commonwealth Games in Birmingham, England. However, despite the team finishing third in their qualifying heat they were disqualified from the event on a technicality for not affirming a team change with the officials at least an hour before the race.

He was a member of the Ghana National Petroleum Corporation's (GNPC) Fastest Human Speedsters Club in 2023. He ran 10.13 seconds for the 100 metres in May 2023, racing in Tamale, Ghana.

He placed sixth in the final of the 100 metres at the delayed 2023 African Games in Accra in March 2024. He was a member of a Ghanaian 4 × 100 m relay team finished second at the Penn Relays in April 2024, in a time of 39.71 seconds. He ran a lifetime 100 metres best of 10.01 seconds competing in Hattiesburg, Mississippi in June 2024, however the mark had a high (+3.1) wind reading.

He ran a personal best for the 60 metres of 6.52 seconds in Nashville, Tennessee, on January 11, 2025. He was selected for the 60 metres at the 2025 World Athletics Indoor Championships in Nanjing. He competed at the 2025 World Athletics Relays in China in the Men's 4 × 100 metres relay in May 2025. On the second day of the competition he helped Ghana secure a qualifying place for the upcoming World Championships.

== Personal life ==
He attended Accra Technical University in 2019, and was studying at the University for Development Studies in Tamale, Ghana in 2020. He received a visa to attend William Carey University in Mississippi, United States in 2023.
