= Ferdinand Omanyala =

Kenyan sprinter

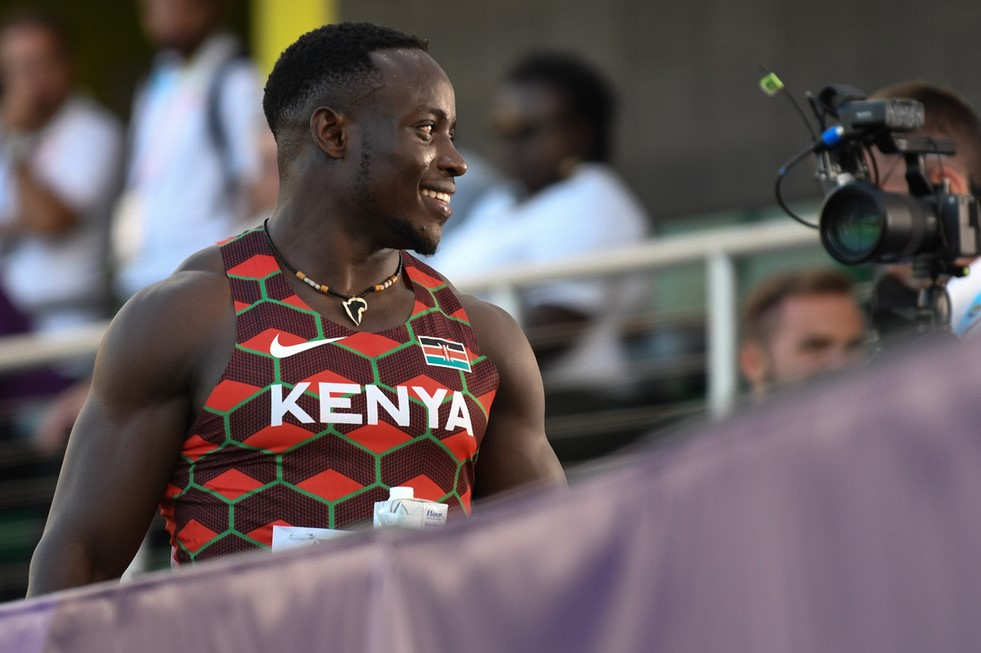
- Omanyala at the 2022 World Athletics Championships in Eugene

Personal information
- Full name: Ferdinand Omanyala Omurwa
- Born: 2 January 1996 (age 30) Hamisi, Vihiga County, Kenya
- Education: Friends School Kamusinga; University of Nairobi
- Height: 1.75 m (5 ft 9 in)
- Weight: 82 kg (181 lb)

Sport
- Country: Kenya
- Sport: Athletics
- Events: 60 m, 100 m, 200 m

Achievements and titles
- Personal bests: 100 m: 9.77A AR (Nairobi 2021); 200 m: 20.33A (Abuja 2022); Indoors; 60 m: 6.54 NR (Liévin 2023)
Medal record
Men's athletics
Representing Kenya
Commonwealth Games
Gold medal – first place	2022 Birmingham	100 m
African Championships
Gold medal – first place	2022 Mauritius	100 m
Gold medal – first place	2022 Mauritius	4×100 m

Ferdinand Omanyala Omurwa (born 2 January 1996) is a Kenyan sprinter competing in the 60 metres, 100 and 200 m. In 2022, he won his first international championships, with victories in the 100 m at the Commonwealth Games, and African Championships in Athletics. Omanyala is the African record holder and the tenth-fastest man of all time in the event after clocking a time of 9.77 seconds on 18 September 2021 in Nairobi. He also holds the Kenyan national record in the 60 m.

== Early life ==
Ferdinand Omanyala Omurwa was born in Hamisi as the third son of Dishon and Adelaide Omurwa, though the family settled in Tongaren soon afterwards.

== Career ==
In 2015, Omanyala began his athletics career in Kenya as a chemistry student at the University of Nairobi. He made this move after a friend noticed his speed while he was playing rugby. He switched from rugby to track, and only a few weeks later, he ran a time of 10.4 s in his first race in Kakamega. The same year, he won the national Olympics trials over the 100 m distance in a time of 10.37 s but never met the qualifying standard for the Olympics, which was 10.16 s.

Following a doping offence in 2017, Omanyala received a 14-month suspension. He tested positive for the prohibited substance betamethasone after undergoing treatment for his back injury, which he got during training.

Omanyala won the national title in the 100 metres in 2019.

On 30 March 2021, he set a national record of 10.01 seconds in the 100 m in winning a meeting at Yabatech Sport Complex in Lagos, Nigeria. At the 2020 Tokyo Olympics 100 metres semi-final in August that year, he set a new national record of 10.00 seconds. Omanyala was 0.04 s behind eventual silver medalist Fred Kerley and 0.02 s behind eventual bronze medalist Andre De Grasse. The same month, he ran a new personal best of 9.86 seconds in Austria, becoming the first Kenyan ever to break the 10-second barrier. In September, he ran 9.77 seconds (+1.2 m/s) for a new African record at the Absa Kip Keino Classic held in Nairobi, Kenya coming in a close second place behind Trayvon Bromell, who ran a world-leading 9.76 s.

In June 2022, Omanyala became African 100 m champion before he was eliminated in the semi-finals of the World Championships held in Eugene, Oregon, in July, after arriving at the event only a couple of hours before his first round heat due to visa problems. In August, he claimed Kenya's first gold medal at the Birmingham Commonwealth Games, becoming the first Kenyan to win gold in the 100-metre race in 60 years.

His run up to the 2024 Summer Olympics was promising, clocking 10.01 at the FBK Games in the Netherlands. Omanyala served as Kenya's flag bearer alongside Triza Atuka for the opening ceremony of the Paris games. He was disappointed to only record 10.08 seconds in the semi-finals.

== Personal life ==
Omanyala is married to Laventa Amutavi, and they have a son. His official sponsors are Odibets, a Kenyan sports betting company.

== Achievements ==
=== International competitions ===
Representing Kenya
Year	Competition	Venue	Position	Event	Time
2017	World Relays	Nassau, Bahamas	7th	4 × 200 m relay	1:23.04 SB^{1}
2021	Olympic Games	Tokyo, Japan	8th (sf)	100 m	10.00 NR
2022	World Indoor Championships	Belgrade, Serbia	13th (sf)	60 m i	6.64
2022	African Championships	Saint Pierre, Mauritius	1st	100 m	9.93
2022	African Championships	Saint Pierre, Mauritius	30th (h)	200 m	21.16
2022	African Championships	Saint Pierre, Mauritius	1st	4 × 100 m relay	39.28 NR
2022	World Championships	Eugene, OR, United States	13th (sf)	100 m	10.14
2022	Commonwealth Games	Birmingham, United Kingdom	1st	100 m	10.02
2022	Commonwealth Games	Birmingham, United Kingdom	–	4 × 100 m relay	DNF
2023	World Championships	Budapest, Hungary	7th	100 m	10.07
2024	World Indoor Championships	Glasgow, United Kingdom	4th	60 m	6.56
2024	Olympic Games	Paris, France	18th (sf)	100 m	10.08
2025	World Championships	Tokyo, Japan	14th (sf)	100 m	10.09
2026	Commonwealth Games	Glasgow, United Kingdom	20th (sf)	100 m	10.19

^{1}Time from the heats; Omanyala was replaced in the final.

=== National titles ===
- Kenyan Athletics Championships
  - 100 metres: 2019, 2022
  - 200 metres: 2022

=== Track records ===
As of 8 September 2024, Omanyala holds the following track records for 100 metres.

Location	Time	Windspeed m/s	Date	Notes
Andorf	9.86	+0.6	14/08/2021	
Gaborone	9.78	+2.3	29/04/2023	
Germiston	9.98	–0.9	13/04/2022	
Lahti	10.09 ditto	+1.8 +0.6	19/08/2021 ditto	
Saint Pierre	9.93	+4.5	09/06/2022	Track record shared with Akani Simbine (RSA) from the same race.

== See also ==
- Eliud Kipchoge
- Faith Kipyegon
- David Rudisha
- Angela Okutoyi
- Collins Injera

Olympic Games
Preceded by Andrew Amonde; Mercy Moim	Flagbearer for Kenya; Paris 2024 with Triza Atuka	Succeeded by Incumbent
