= Sydney Siame =

Zambian sprinter

Personal information
- Full name: Sydney Sido Siame
- Born: 7 October 1997 (age 28) Isoka, Zambia
- Height: 1.70 m (5 ft 7 in)
- Weight: 65 kg (143 lb)

Sport
- Sport: Athletics
- Events: 100 m, 200 m
Medal record
Men's athletics
Representing Zambia
African Games
Gold medal – first place	2019 Rabat	200 m
African Championships
Bronze medal – third place	2016 Durban	4×100 m
Summer Youth Olympics
Gold medal – first place	2014 Nanjing	100 m

Sydney Sido Siame (born 7 October 1997) is a Zambian sprinter. He competed in the 200 metres at the 2015 World Championships in Beijing without advancing from the first round. In addition, he won a gold medal at the 2014 Summer Youth Olympics.

A run of 9.88 seconds was recorded for the 100 m in Lusaka in 2017, but Siame's time was excluded from the global lists on the basis of doubtful timing. This would have been the first time a Zambian had broken the 10-second barrier and a highly unusual improvement of 0.34 seconds for the athlete.

== Competition record ==
Year	Competition	Venue	Position	Event	Notes
Representing Zambia
2014	African Youth Games	Gaborone, Botswana	2nd	100 m	10.58
2014	World Junior Championships	Eugene, United States	16th (sf)	100 m	10.68
2014	Youth Olympic Games	Nanjing, China	1st	100 m	10.56
2015	African Junior Championships	Addis Ababa, Ethiopia	3rd	100 m	10.77
2015	World Championships	Beijing, China	45th (h)	200 m	21.08
2015	African Games	Brazzaville, Republic of the Congo	6th (h)	100 m	10.35^{1}
2015	African Games	Brazzaville, Republic of the Congo	7th	200 m	21.21
2015	African Games	Brazzaville, Republic of the Congo	3rd (h)	4 × 100 m relay	39.31^{2}
2016	African Championships	Durban, South Africa	5th	200 m	20.83
2016	African Championships	Durban, South Africa	3rd	4 × 100 m relay	39.77
2017	World Championships	London, United Kingdom	12th (sf)	200 m	20.54
2018	World Indoor Championships	Birmingham, United Kingdom	32nd (h)	60 m	6.88
2018	Commonwealth Games	Gold Coast, Australia	5th	200 m	20.62
2018	African Championships	Asaba, Nigeria	6th	200 m	20.79
2018	African Championships	Asaba, Nigeria	4th	4 × 400 m relay	3:04.98
2019	African Games	Rabat, Morocco	1st	200 m	20.35
2019	World Championships	Doha, Qatar	28th (h)	200 m	20.58
2021^{3}	Olympic Games	Tokyo, Japan	37th (h)	200 m	21.01
2022	African Championships	Port Louis, Mauritius	20th (sf)	100 m	10.50
2022	African Championships	Port Louis, Mauritius	18th (sf)	200 m	21.31

^{1}Disqualified in the semifinals

^{2}Disqualified in the final

^{3}Postponed from 2020 due to the COVID-19 pandemic

== Personal bests ==
Outdoor

- 100 metres – 10.06 (+1.1 m/s, Šamorín 2018)
- 200 metres – 20.16 (+1.5 m/s, La Chaux-de-Fonds 2019)
