= Usheoritse Itsekiri =

Nigerian sprinter (born 1998)

Personal information
- Born: 31 January 1998 (age 28) Sapele, Nigeria

Sport
- Sport: Track and field
- Event: 100 metres

Achievements and titles
- Personal bests: 100 m – 10.02 (Rabat 2019); 200 m – 20.53 (Kortrijk 2019)
Medal record
Representing Nigeria
Men's athletics
African Games
Gold medal – first place	2023 Accra	4×100 m relay
Silver medal – second place	2019 Rabat	4×100 m relay
Silver medal – second place	2023 Accra	100 m
Bronze medal – third place	2019 Rabat	100 m
African Championships
Silver medal – second place	2024 Douala	4×100 m relay
- Updated on 25 Sept 2019

Usheoritse Ese Itsekiri (born 31 January 1998) is a Nigerian sprinter. He was the 2018 Nigerian National Sports Festival champion and the 2019 African Games bronze medallist in the 100 metres. He also won a silver medal in the 4 × 100 m relay at these games.

At the 2019 Nigerian Championships in Kaduna, he took both the 100 and 200 metres titles. These were his first senior national titles. This effectively ended Seye Ogunlewe's streak of three consecutive national titles in the 100 m. He had previously been the national junior champion in 2017, in a race that saw him deny Raymond Ekevwo a successful defense of the junior title.

Itsekiri competed at the 2018 Commonwealth Games in the 4x100 metres relay. He was a member of the Nigerian team that qualified for the final only to suffer disqualification. In 2018, he competed at the African Championships in Asaba, helping the Nigerian team qualify for the 4 x 100 metres relay final. Though not in the final quartet, he won a silver medal in the event as the Nigerian team placed second in the final. He also competed for Nigeria at the 2019 Yokohama World Relays in the 4 x 100 and 4 x 200 metres relay.

Itsekiri gained his first experience at international competition at the 2015 African Youth Athletics Championships in Reduit, where he finished fourth over 200 metres. He later participated in the 2015 Commonwealth Youth Games held in Apia and reached both the 100 and 200 metres semi-finals.

== National Titles ==
Nigerian Championships

- 100 m: 2019
- 200 m: 2019

Nigerian Junior Championships

- 100 m: 2017

== Personal bests ==
100 metres: 10.02 s (Rabat 2019)

200 metres: 20.53 s (Kortrijk 2019)

4 x 100 metres relay: 38.52 s (Gold Coast 2018)
