= Sarfo Ansah =

Ghanaian sprinter (born 1998)

Personal information
- Full name: Sarfo Ansah
- Nationality: Ghanaian
- Born: 30 July 1998 (age 27) Amasaman, Ghana

Sport
- Country: Ghana
- Sport: Track and field
- Event(s): 100 metres 200 metres 4 × 100 metres relay
- University team: University for Development Studies

Sarfo Ansah (born 30 July 1998) is a Ghanaian athlete specializing in sprinting. Sarfo Ansah is part of the Ghana 4 × 100 metres relay team at the Tokyo 2020 Olympics.

== Early life and education ==
Ansah was born on 30 July 1998 in Amasaman, a town in Accra, the capital city of Ghana. He attended Jachie-Pramso Secondary School for his secondary school education. He later proceeded to University for Development Studies (UDS), Tamale Ghana.

== Athletic career ==
After Ansah enrolled at UDS, he started competing for the school's track and field team. In January 2018, he won both the 100 and 200 metres race at the Ghana Universities Sports Association (GUSA) Games in Tamale. He also led the UDS team to place first in the finals of the 4 × 100 metres relay. The following year he won the 200 metres race and placed 2nd in the 100 metres with Benjamin Azamati, causing an upset to place first. He led them to maintain their title in the 4 × 100 metres relay while setting a new record with a time of 40.27s, beating the previous record which stood at 40.29s.

In May 2021, he won gold in the 100 and 200 meters races at the ECOWAS Athletics Championships in Kaduna, Nigeria. He won the 100 meters race with a time of 10.24 s and the 200 meters with 21.33 s.

== Statistics ==
=== Personal best ===
Information from World Athletics profile unless otherwise noted.

- 100 Meter: 10.39 s (+0.1 m/s), 8 June 2022 in Nairobi
- 200 Meter: 21.04 s (+0.1 m/s), 18 August 2018 in Burkina Faso
