= Joseph Amoah (sprinter) =

Ghanaian sprinter (born 1997)

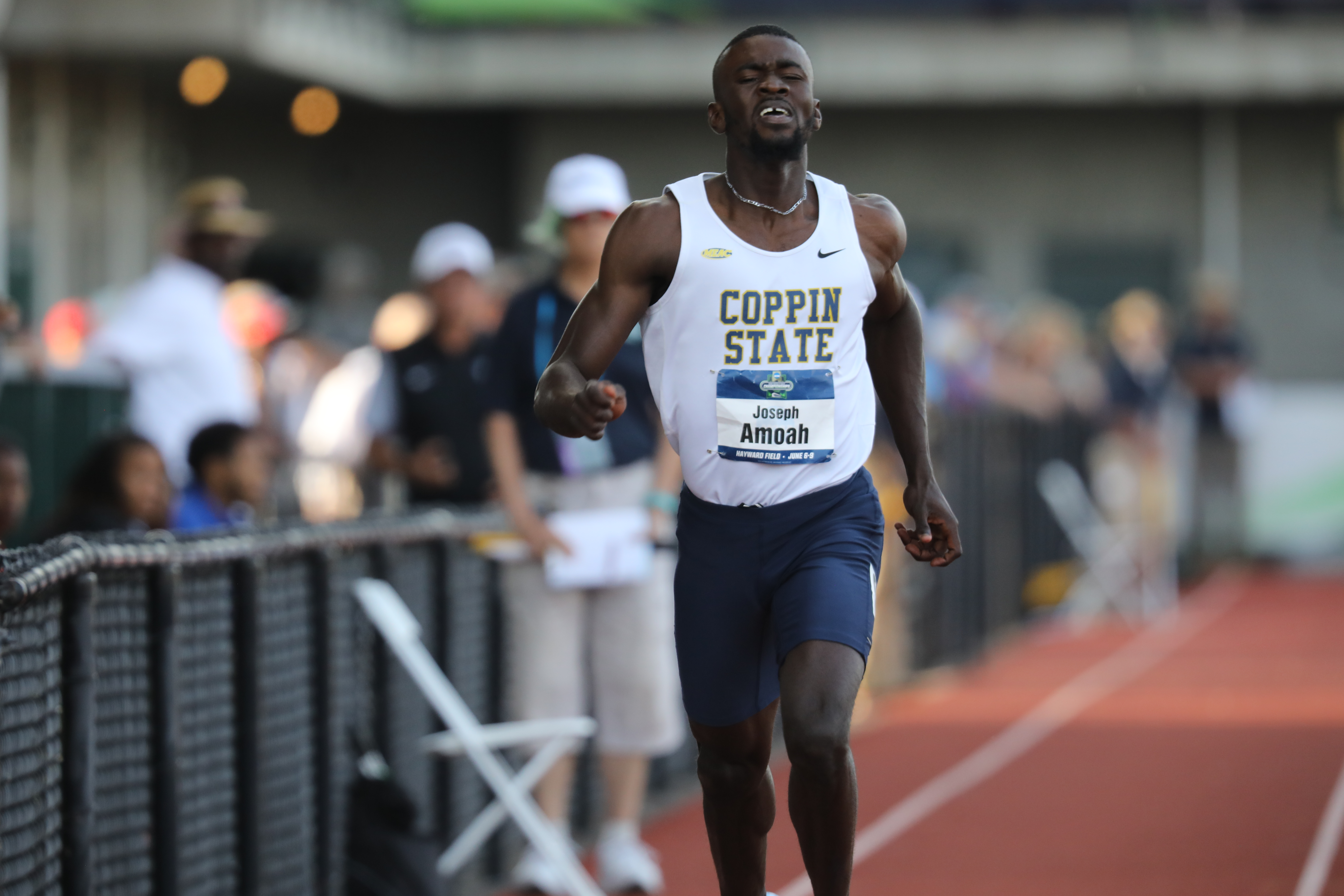
- Amoah in 2018

Personal information
- Full name: Joseph Paul Amoah
- Born: 12 January 1997 (age 29) Greater Accra, Ghana
- Height: 180 cm (5 ft 11 in)
- Weight: 68 kg (150 lb)

Sport
- Country: Ghana
- Sport: Athletics
- Events: 100 m, 200 m
- College team: Coppin State Eagles (2017–2021)
- Coached by: Jamie Wilson

Achievements and titles
- Personal bests: 100 m: 9.94 (2022); 200 m: 20.08 (2019, NR)
Medal record
Men's athletics
Representing Ghana
African Championships
Bronze medal – third place	2026 Accra	4×100 m relay
Commonwealth Games
Bronze medal – third place	2022 Birmingham	200 m
African Games
Gold medal – first place	2019 Rabat	4×100 m relay
Gold medal – first place	2023 Accra	200 m
Silver medal – second place	2023 Accra	4×100 m relay

Joseph Paul Amoah (born 12 January 1997) is a Ghanaian sprinter specializing in the 100 metres and the 200 metres. He competed at the 2019 World Athletics Championships in the 100 metres and 4 × 100 metres relay, and at the 2019 African Games, he won a gold medal in the 4 × 100 metres relay. He was also a 100 metres finalist at the 2019 African Games, finishing fourth.

Amoah has personal best times of 9.94 seconds and 20.08 seconds in the 100 metres and 200 metres respectively. His personal best performance in the 200 metres broke the Ghanaian record previously held by three-time Olympian Emmanuel Tuffour by 0.07 seconds. He is currently the Africa Games champion for the 200 meters race. He won this with a time of 20.70.

== Early life ==
Amoah was born on 12 January 1997 to Thomas Amoah and Alberta Antwi in Greater Accra, Ghana. Joseph Amoah was raised by his uncle Dr. Victor Antwi from middle school onwards. His preferred sport growing up was football, but transitioned to athletics while attending Prempeh College in Kumasi where his running talent was discovered. As a 19 years old boy, he emerged as an Olympic hopeful for Ghana in the sprints after running 100 metres in 10.08 seconds at the 2016 Ghana's Fastest Human competition.

== University ==
After his prep career at Prempeh College, he decided to quit athletics to enrolling in Kwame Nkrumah University of Science and Technology (KNUST). However the head coach of athletics at KNUST had heard of Amoah's talent while at Prempeh college and convinced Amoah to join the team with the help of his uncle. In 2017, he was transferred to Coppin State University in Baltimore, of which he competes in Division I of the National Collegiate Athletic Association (NCAA), the highest level of intercollegiate athletics in the United States.

At the year 2019, Mid-Eastern Athletic Conference Championships in May, Joseph Amoah became the first Ghanaian in any sport to qualify for the 2020 Summer Olympics by running 200 metres in a personal best time in 20.20 seconds. It was the fastest performance from a Ghanaian since 1995 and also qualified him for the 2019 World Athletics Championships. Later in June of that season at the NCAA Division I Championships, he improved his personal best times in the 100 metres and 200 metres to 10.01 seconds and 20.08 seconds respectively. He broke three-time Olympian Emmanuel Tuffour's 24 years old Ghanaian record in the 200 metres (20.15 seconds, set at altitude) and qualified for the 2020 Summer Olympics in the 100 metres.

== 2021 World Relays ==
Amoah was selected to represent Ghana at the 2021 World Relays on 1–2 May in Poland, which served as a qualifier for the 2021 Olympic Games and the 2022 World Championships for Ghana. In the finals, Joseph Amoah anchored Ghana to bronze with a time of 39.11 seconds, but the team was disqualified after footage review showed Amoah receiving the baton beyond the passing zone from teammate Joseph Oduro Manu. However, because they qualified for the final with a time of 38.79 seconds in the semi-finals, Ghana with Amoah still qualified to compete at the Olympic Games.

== Career ==
Joseph Paul ran under 10 seconds for the first time on 23 April 2022 with a time of 9.94 seconds, making him the 4th Ghanaian to run the event under 10 seconds. The time also marked the first time in Ghana's history where two of their athletes made the top 2 in the world for the 100m.

== Achievements ==
=== International championships ===
Representing Ghana
Year	Competition	Position	Event	Time	Wind (m/s)	Venue	Notes
2018	Commonwealth Games	15th	200 m	20.99	0.0	Gold Coast, Australia	
2019	African Games	4th	100 m	10.11	+1.6	Rabat, Morocco	
2019	African Games	1st	4×100 m relay	38.30	—N/a	Rabat, Morocco	
2019	African Games	21st	200 m	21.20	+0.3	Rabat, Morocco	
2019	World Championships	34th	100 m	10.36	−0.8	Doha, Qatar	
2019	World Championships	13th	4×100 m relay	38.24	—N/a	Doha, Qatar	
2021	World Relays	~~3rd~~ DQ	4×100 m relay	~~39.11~~	—N/a	Chorzów, Poland	Passing outside zone
2022	Commonwealth Games	3rd	200 m	20.49		Birmingham, United Kingdom	
2023	World Championships	27th (h)	200 m	20.56		Budapest, Hungary	
2024	African Games	1st	200 m	20.70	−2.8	Accra, Ghana	
2024	African Games	2nd	4 × 100 m relay	38.43		Accra, Ghana	
2024	Olympic Games	13th (h)	4 × 100 m relay	DQ		Paris, France	
2025	World Championships	4th	4 × 100 m relay	37.93		Tokyo, Japan	
2026	Commonwealth Games	7th	200 m	20.47	+1.7	Glasgow, United Kingdom	
2026	Commonwealth Games	4th	4 × 100 m relay	38.13		Glasgow, United Kingdom	

=== National championships ===
Representing the Coppin State Eagles
Year	Competition	Position	Event	Time	Wind (m/s)	Venue	Notes
2018	NCAA Division I Championships	13th	200 m	20.60	+1.1	Eugene, United States	
2019	NCAA Division I Championships	8th	100 m	10.22	+0.8	Austin, United States	
2019	NCAA Division I Championships	6th	200 m	20.19	+0.8	Austin, United States	
2019	NCAA Division I Championships	14th	4×100 m relay	39.30	—N/a	Austin, United States	
2021	NCAA Division I Championships	15th	4×100 m relay	39.51	—N/a	Eugene, United States	
2021	NCAA Division I Championships	9th	100 m	10.21	+0.9	Eugene, United States	
2021	NCAA Division I Championships	10th	200 m	20.51	+1.4	Eugene, United States	

- NCAA results from Track & Field Results Reporting System profile.

Olympic Games
Preceded by Carlos Mäder	Flag bearer for Ghana; Paris 2024 with Rose Amoanimaa Yeboah	Succeeded by Incumbent
