= Henricho Bruintjies =

South African sprinter (born 1993)

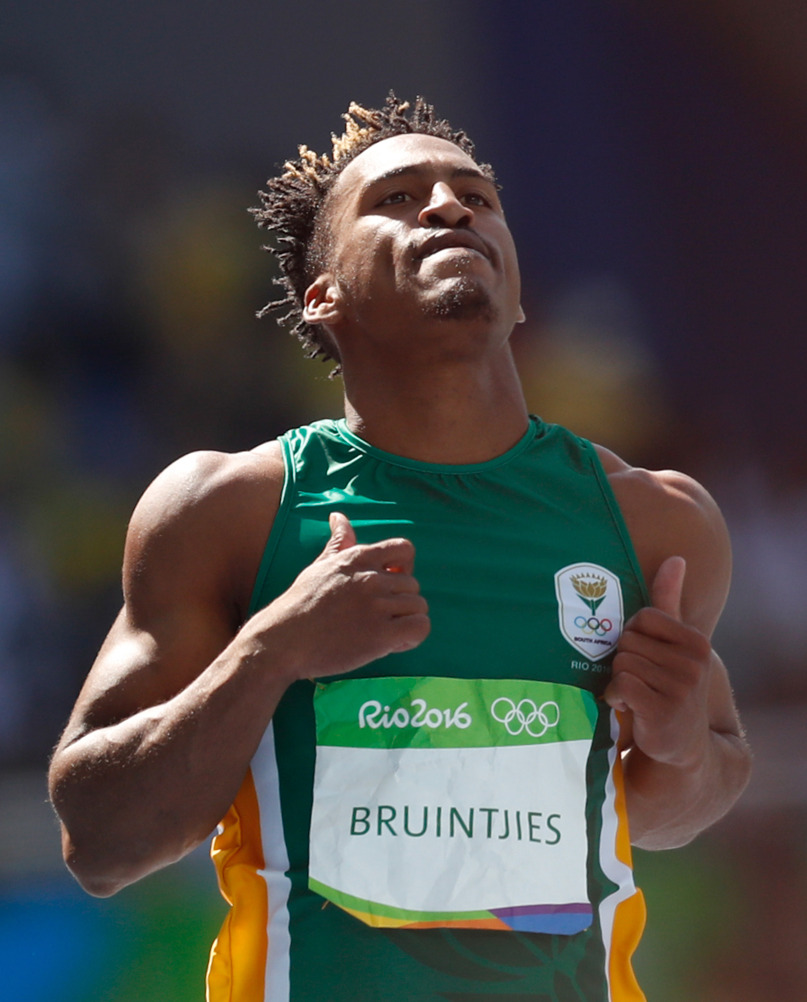
- Bruintjies at the 2016 Olympics

Personal information
- Born: July 16, 1993 (age 33) Paarl, South Africa
- Height: 1.79 m (5 ft 10 1/2 in)
- Weight: 72 kg (159 lb; 11 st 5 lb)

Sport
- Country: South Africa
- Events: 100 metres 200 metres
- Coached by: Morne Nagel

Achievements and titles
- Personal bests: 100 m: 9.97 (2015); 200 m: 20.62 (2015)
Medal record
Men's athletics
Representing South Africa
African Games
Bronze medal – third place	2019 Rabat	4x100 m
African Championships
Gold medal – first place	2018 Asaba	4×100 m
Silver medal – second place	2022 Mauritius	4×100 m
Bronze medal – third place	2022 Mauritius	100 m
Commonwealth Games
Silver medal – second place	2018 Gold Coast	100 m
Silver medal – second place	2018 Gold Coast	4x100 m

Henricho Bruintjies (born 16 July 1993) is a South African sprinter. He broke the 10-second barrier with a run of 9.97 seconds in 2015. He has represented his country at the Summer Olympics, World Championships and Commonwealth Games. He is a silver medalist in the 100 metres in the 2018 Commonwealth Games

== Career ==
Bruintjies took up athletics as a grade 1 schoolboy. In 2013, he was the South African under-23 champion in the 100 metres, defeating Akani Simbine in 10.44; at the national senior championships, he placed second behind Simon Magakwe in 10.58. He represented South Africa at the 2013 Summer Universiade in the 4 × 100 metres relay; the South African team placed seventh. In 2014, Bruintjies improved his personal best to 10.17A (+1.8 m/s) and ran the opening leg for South Africa's relay team at the Commonwealth Games in Glasgow; South Africa placed fourth in a national record 38.35. Bruintjies also competed in the 2014 African Championships, taking part in both the individual 100 metres and the 4 × 100 metres relay; in the individual event, he was eliminated in the semi-finals, while the South African relay team was disqualified in the heats.

2015 was Bruintjies's breakthrough year. On 8 June, he won the 100 m ahead of fellow South African Anaso Jobodwana at the Josef Odložil Memorial in Prague, running 10.06 (+1.5 m/s); the time was his personal best and a South African sea-level record. A month later, he ran 9.97 (+0.8 m/s) at near-altitude in La Chaux-de-Fonds, breaking Magakwe's South African record of 9.98; he was the third South African (after Magakwe and Simbine) to break 10 seconds in the 100 metres. Simbine equalled Bruintjies's record at the Universiade only four days later.

Bruintjies was selected for the 2015 World Championships in Beijing.

Bruintjies competed in the 100 m event at the 2016 Summer Olympics in Rio de Janeiro. He finished 6th in his heat with a time of 10.33 seconds and did not advance to the semifinals.
