= Benjamin Azamati =

Ghanaian sprinter (born 1998)

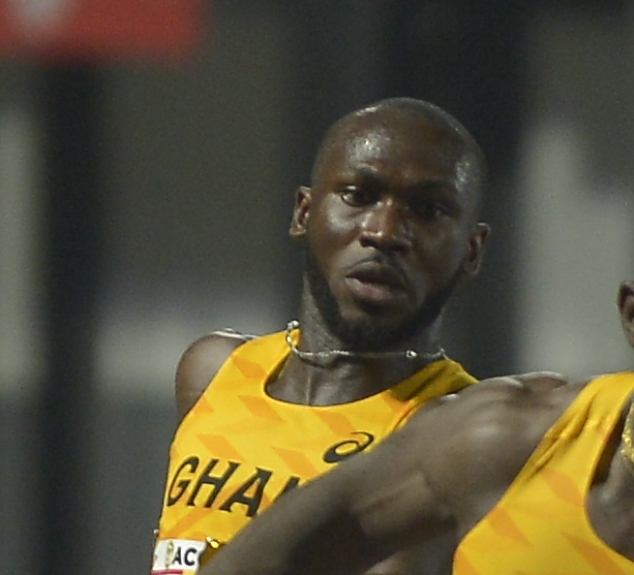
- Azamati-Kwaku at the 2023 African Games

Personal information
- Born: Benjamin Azamati-Kwaku; 14 January 1998 (age 28) Akim Oda, Ghana
- Height: 1.70 m (5 ft 7 in)
- Weight: 60 kg (132 lb)

Sport
- Country: Ghana
- Sport: Athletics
- Events: 100 m, 200 m
- College team: West Texas A&M University

Achievements and titles
- Personal best: 100 m: 9.90 (2022, NR); 200 m: 20.13 (2021)
Medal record
Men's athletics
Representing Ghana
African Games
| Gold medal – first place | 2019 Rabat | 4×100 m relay |
| Silver medal – second place | 2023 Accra | 4×100 m relay |

Benjamin Azamati-Kwaku (born 14 January 1998) is a Ghanaian sprinter, who currently competes for On running.

He made history by breaking a 22-year national record held by Leo Myles Mills on 26 March 2021 in Texas by clocking 9.97 seconds to qualify him for the Tokyo Summer Olympics.

Mustafa Ussif, the Sports Minister and Dr Bella Bello Bitugu, the Director of the University of Ghana Sports Directorate, congratulated Benjamin Azamati on the national feat.

== Early life and education ==
Azamati was born on 14 January 1998 to John and Faustina Azamati in Akim Oda, Ghana.

His preferred sport growing up was football, but transitioned to athletics while attending Presbyterian Boys' Senior High School in Accra where his running talent was discovered by his PE masters (Nathaniel Botchway, Gideon Dukplah and Kofi Dadzie).

== Occupation and honors ==
As a 21-year old, he emerged as an Olympic hopeful for Ghana in the sprints after running 100 metres in 10.02 seconds HT at the 2019 Ghana's Fastest Human competition. He won a gold medal in the 4 × 100 m relay at the 2019 African Games in Rabat. He won the GUSA 100m on two occasions.

In 2021, he improved the 100m national record with 9.97 and improved his 200m personal best to 20.13.

On 25 March 2022, Azamati improved his own 100m national record to an early world lead of 9.90 seconds in Texas, USA, making him the joint 4th fastest collegiate of all-time with Trayvon Bromell. This mark also placed him within the top 50 all-time 100m sprint performances with only 6 Africans running faster in the continent at the time.

== Career statistics ==
=== Personal bests ===
| Surface | Distance | Time (s) | W (m/s) | Date | Location | Notes |
|---|---|---|---|---|---|---|
| Outdoor | 100 metres | 9.9 | +2.0 | 25 March 2022 | Austin, United States | |
| Outdoor | 200 metres | 20.13 | +1.1 | 8 May 2021 | Canyon, United States | |
| Outdoor | 200 metres | 20.13 | +1.4 | 9 April 2022 | Canyon, United States | |
| Outdoor | 4 × 100 metres relay | 38.07 | —N/a | 5 May 2024 | Nassau, The Bahamas | NR |
| Indoor | 60 metres | 6.54 | | 5 February 2022 | Albuquerque, United States | |
| Indoor | 200 metres | 20.57 | | 2022 | Texas, United States | |

=== International championships ===
Representing Ghana
| Year | Competition | Position | Event | Time | Wind (m/s) | Venue | Notes |
|---|---|---|---|---|---|---|---|
| 2019 | African Games | 9th (SF) | 100 m | 10.43 | -0.6 | Rabat, Morocco | |
| 2019 | African Games | 1st | 4 × 100 m relay | 38.30 | | Rabat, Morocco | |
| 2019 | World Championships | 13th (h) | 4 × 100 m relay | 38.24 SB | | Doha, Qatar | |
| 2021 | World Relay Championships | DQ | 4 × 100 m relay | — | | Chorzów, Poland | |
| 2021 | 2020 Summer Olympics | DQ | 4 × 100 m relay | — | | Tokyo | |
| 2022 | Oslo ExxonMobil Bislett Games | 4th | 100m | 10.15 | | Oslo | |
| 2022 | Paris-St-Denis Meeting Areva | 8th | 200m | 20.77 | | Paris | |
| 2022 | 2022 World Athletics Championships | 29th (h) | 100 m | 10.18 | | Eugene | |
| 2022 | 2022 World Athletics Championships | 5th (F) | 4 × 100 m relay | 38.07 NR | | Eugene | |
| 2022 | Commonwealth Games | 4th (F) | 100 m | 10.16 | | Birmingham | |
| 2022 | Commonwealth Games | DQ | 4 × 100 m relay | TR 24.11 | | Birmingham | |
| 2024 | 2023 African Games | 5th (F) | 100 m | 10.45 | -0.8 | Accra, Ghana | |
| 2024 | 2023 African Games | 2nd | 4 × 100 m relay | 38.43 | | Accra, Ghana | |
| 2024 | 2024 World Athletics Relays | 2nd (rep) | 4 × 100 m relay | 38.29 | | Nassau, The Bahamas | |
| 2024 | 2024 Summer Olympics | 25th (SF) | 100 m | 10.17 | +0.7 | Paris, France | |
| 2024 | 2024 Summer Olympics | DQ | 4 × 100 m relay | TR 24.7 | | Paris, France | |
| 2025 | 2025 World Athletics Championships | 34th (h) | 100 m | 10.30 | -1.2 | Tokyo, Japan | |
