= Arthur Cissé =

Ivorian sprinter (born 1996)

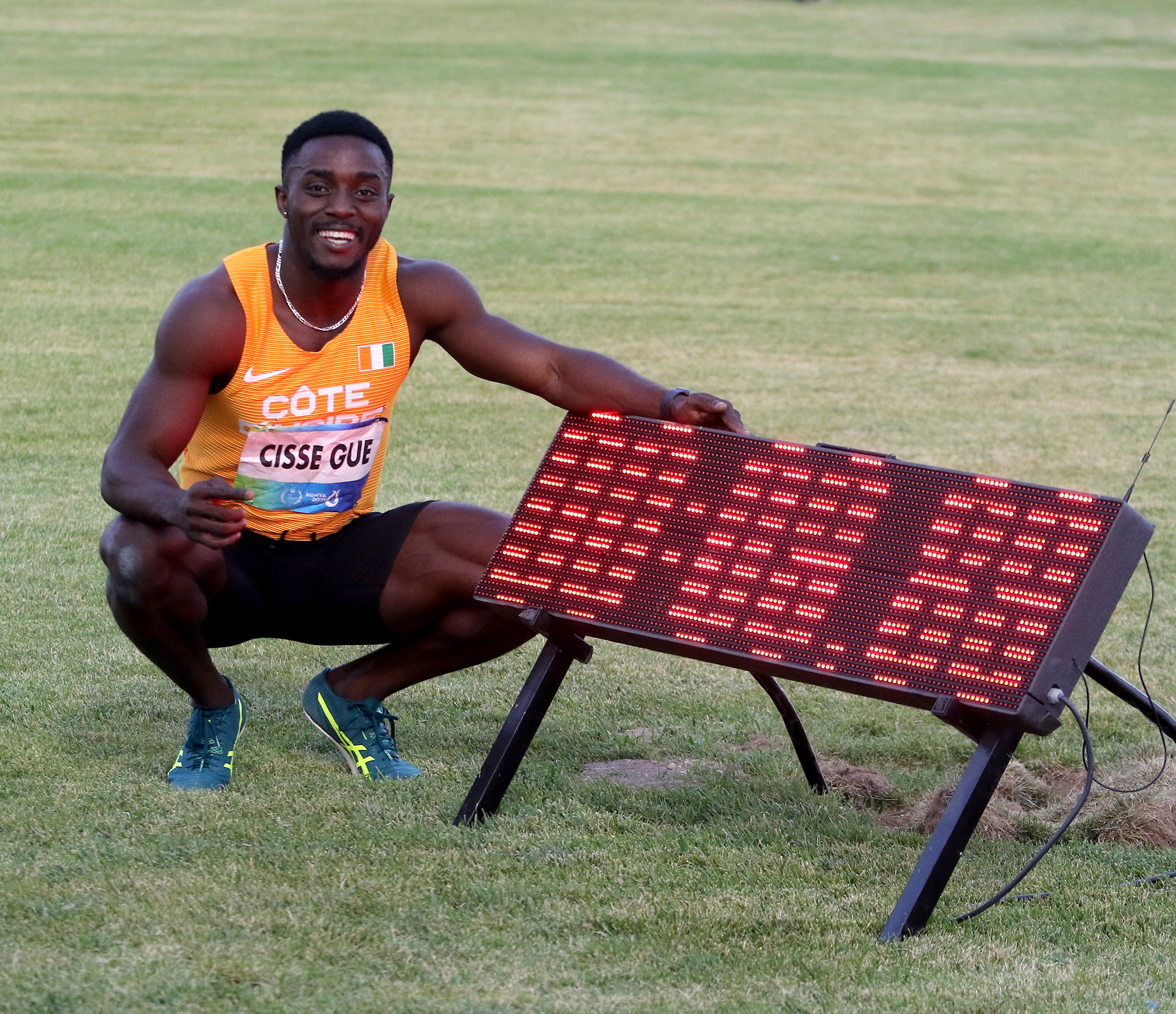
- Cissé at the 2021 Islamic Solidarity Games

Personal information
- Full name: Arthur Gue Cissé
- Nationality: Ivorian
- Born: 29 December 1996 (age 29) Man, Ivory Coast

Sport
- Sport: Athletics
- Event: Sprints
- Club: EFS Reims Athlétisme
- Coached by: Anthony Koffi

Achievements and titles
- Personal bests: 60 m: 6.53 NR (2019, 2021); 100 m: 9.93 NR (2019); 150 m: 15.15 NR (2020); 200 m: 20.23 NR (2020)
Medal record
Men's athletics
Representing the Ivory Coast
African Games
Gold medal – first place	2015 Brazzaville	4×100 m relay
Silver medal – second place	2019 Rabat	100 m
African Championships
Gold medal – first place	2026 Accra	4×100 m relay
Silver medal – second place	2018 Asaba	100 m
Silver medal – second place	2016 Durban	4×100 m relay
Bronze medal – third place	2018 Asaba	4×100 m relay
Bronze medal – third place	2024 Douala	4×100 m relay
Islamic Solidarity Games
Gold medal – first place	2021 Konya	100 m
Bronze medal – third place	2017 Baku	4×100 m relay
Jeux de la Francophonie
Gold medal – first place	2017 Abidjan	4×100 m relay
Silver medal – second place	2017 Abidjan	100 m
Silver medal – second place	2017 Abidjan	200 m
African Junior Championships
Silver medal – second place	2015 Addis Ababa	100 m

Arthur Gue Cissé (born 29 December 1996) is an Ivorian professional sprinter specializing in the sprints. He owns the Ivorian national records in the 60 m, 100 m, 150 m, and 200 m distances, including a sub-10 second time of 9.93 s in the 100 m. He has won several medals at the international level including a gold medal in the 2015 African Games 4 × 100 m relay and a silver medal in the 2018 African Championships 100 m.

He became the 131st man to break the 10-second barrier in the 100 m on 16 June 2018, setting a national record of 9.94 s. He is coached by Anthony Koffi, the coach of fellow Ivorian sprinters and Olympians Ben Youssef Meïté and Marie-Josée Ta Lou.

== Statistics ==
Information from World Athletics profile unless otherwise noted.

=== Personal bests ===
Event	Time	Wind	Venue	Date	Notes
60 m	6.53	—N/a	Berlin, Germany	1 February 2019	NR
60 m	6.53	—N/a	Berlin, Germany	5 February 2021	=NR
100 m	9.93	+1.9	Leverkusen, Germany	24 July 2019	NR
150 m	15.15	+0.5	Ostrava, Czech Republic	8 September 2020	NR
200 m	20.23	+0.9	Doha, Qatar	25 September 2020	NR
4×100 m relay	38.92	—N/a	Asaba, Nigeria	3 August 2018	

=== International championship results ===
Year	Competition	Venue	Position	Event	Time	Wind (m/s)	Notes
Representing the Ivory Coast
2014	African Championships	Marrakesh, Morocco	23rd	100 m	10.86	−0.2	
2015	African Junior Championships	Addis Ababa, Ethiopia	2nd	100 m	10.63	−1.1	PB
2015	African Junior Championships	Addis Ababa, Ethiopia	5th	200 m	21.92	−2.3	
2015	African Junior Championships	Addis Ababa, Ethiopia	4th	4×100 m relay	41.46	—N/a	PB
2015	African Games	Brazzaville, Republic of the Congo	18th	100 m	10.55	+0.3	
2015	African Games	Brazzaville, Republic of the Congo	1st	4×100 m relay	38.93	—N/a	PB
2016	African Championships	Durban, South Africa	16th	100 m	10.49 w	+2.1	Wind-assisted
2016	African Championships	Durban, South Africa	2nd	4×100 m relay	38.98	—N/a	
2017	Islamic Solidarity Games	Baku, Azerbaijan	5th	100 m	10.43	+0.6	
2017	Islamic Solidarity Games	Baku, Azerbaijan	3rd	4×100 m relay	39.82	—N/a	
2017	Jeux de la Francophonie	Abidjan, Ivory Coast	2nd	100 m	10.34	+0.1	
2017	Jeux de la Francophonie	Abidjan, Ivory Coast	2nd	200 m	20.93	−1.0	
2017	Jeux de la Francophonie	Abidjan, Ivory Coast	1st	4×100 m relay	39.39	—N/a	
2018	World Indoor Championships	Birmingham, United Kingdom	9th	60 m	6.59	—N/a	
2018	African Championships	Asaba, Nigeria	2nd	100 m	10.33	−2.1	
2018	African Championships	Asaba, Nigeria	3rd	4×100 m relay	38.92	—N/a	
2018	Continental Cup	Ostrava, Czech Republic	5th	100 m	10.23^{1}	0.0	
2019	African Games	Rabat, Morocco	2nd	100 m	9.97	+1.6	
2019	African Games	Rabat, Morocco	3rd (semi 2)	4×100 m relay	39.97	—N/a	Q (Note: The Ivory Coast qualified for the final, but Cissé did not run with the team in the final. The team placed 8th in the final.)
2019	World Championships	Doha, Qatar	24th	100 m	10.34	+0.8	
2021	Olympic Games	Tokyo, Japan	21st (sf)	100 m	10.18	+0.9	
2022	World Indoor Championships	Belgrade, Serbia	8th	60 m	6.69	—N/a	
2022	African Championships	Port Louis, Mauritius	13th (sf)	100 m	10.30	+1.1	
2022	World Championships	Eugene, United States	15th (sf)	100 m	10.16	+0.3	
2022	Islamic Solidarity Games	Konya, Turkey	1st	100 m	~~9.89~~ IRM		
2023	Jeux de la Francophonie	Kinshasa, Democratic Republic of the Congo	3rd	100 m	10.24	+0.9	
2023	Jeux de la Francophonie	Kinshasa, Democratic Republic of the Congo	1st	4 × 100 m relay	39.32	—N/a	
2023	World Championships	Budapest, Hungary	55th (h)	100 m	11.58	0.0	
2024	African Games	Accra, Ghana	-	4 × 100 m relay	DNF	—N/a	
2024	African Championships	Douala, Cameroon	3rd	4×100 m relay	39.77	—N/a	
2024	Olympic Games	Paris, France	48th (h)	100 m	10.31	+0.2	
2025	World Indoor Championships	Nanjing, China	19th (sf)	60 m	6.67	—N/a	
2026	African Championships	Accra, Ghana	23rd (h)	200 m	21.68	−2.8	
2026	African Championships	Accra, Ghana	1st	4×100 m relay	38.52	—N/a	

^{1}Representing Africa

=== Circuit wins ===
- Diamond League
  - Doha: 2020 (200 m)
- World Athletics Indoor Tour (60 m)
  - Madrid: 2021

=== 100 m seasonal bests ===
Year	Time	Wind (m/s)	Venue	Date
2014	10.72	−0.3	Marrakesh, Morocco	10 August
2015	10.53	+0.4	Brazzaville, Republic of the Congo	13 September
2016	10.39	−0.9	Remire-Montjoly, French Guiana	4 June
2016	10.39	+0.5	Durban, South Africa	22 June
2017	10.19	+1.0	Bilbao, Spain	24 June
2018	9.94	−0.2	Leverkusen, Germany	16 June
2019	9.93	+1.9	Leverkusen, Germany	24 July
2020	10.04	+0.3	Rome, Italy	17 September
