= Yateya Kambepera =

Botswana sprinter (born 1993)

Personal information
- Nationality: Botswana
- Born: 2 May 1993 (age 33) Maun, Botswana

Sport
- Sport: Running
- Event: Sprint

Achievements and titles
- Personal bests: 100 m: 10.36 NR (Gaborone 2012); 200 m: 20.63 (Gaborone 2012)

Yateya Kambepera (born 2 May 1993) is a Botswana sprinter.

He won the 100 metres and 200 metres at the Botswana National Championships at University of Botswana Stadium on 21 April 2012. In the 100, he beat previous record holder Obakeng Ngwigwa to set a new national record, with 10.36 seconds.
