= Emmanuel Eseme =

Cameroonian sprinter (born 1993)

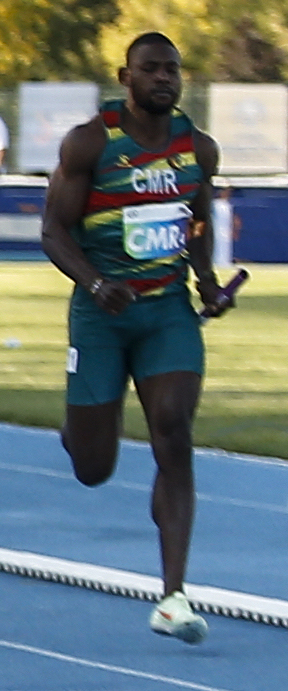
- Emmanuel Eseme in 2022

Personal information
- Born: 17 August 1993 (age 33) Yaoundé, Cameroon
- Height: 1.84 m (6 ft 0 in)
- Weight: 83 kg (183 lb)

Sport
- Country: Cameroon
- Sport: Track and field
- Event: Sprinting
- Club: Sporting CP
- Coached by: Rui Norte

Achievements and titles
- Personal bests: 60 m: 6.52 i NR (2024); 100 m: 9.83 NR (2026); 200 m: 20.23 NR (2025)
Medal record
Men's athletics
Representing Cameroon
African Championships
Gold medal – first place	2026 Accra	100 m
Silver medal – second place	2022 Saint Pierre	200 m
Silver medal – second place	2024 Douala	100 m
Bronze medal – third place	2024 Douala	200 m
African Games
Gold medal – first place	2023 Accra	100 m
Commonwealth Games
Gold medal – first place	2026 Glasgow	100 m
Islamic Solidarity Games
Gold medal – first place	2021 Konya	200 m
Gold medal – first place	2025 Riyadh	200 m
Bronze medal – third place	2025 Riyadh	100 m
Jeux de la Francophonie
Gold medal – first place	2023 Kinshasa	100 m

Emmanuel Alobwede Eseme (born 17 August 1993) is a Cameroonian sprinter. In 2024, he won the gold medal in the men's 100 metres event at the delayed 2023 African Games held in Ghana, the same medal at both the Jeux de la Francophonie in 2023 in Kinshasa, Democratic Republic of the Congo, and the Commonwealth Games in Glasgow, Scotland in 2026. He also won gold in the same event in the African Athletics Championships, again in 2026. Additionally, he has twice been gold medalist at the Islamic Solidarity Games in the 200 metres.

== Career ==
He competed in the men's 200 metres at the 2019 World Athletics Championships held in Doha, Qatar. He did not qualify to compete in the semi-finals.

In the same year, he also competed in the men's 200 metres and men's 4 × 100 metres relay events at the 2019 African Games, in both cases without winning a medal.

He represented Cameroon at the 2020 Summer Olympics in Tokyo, Japan, in the men's 200 meters event.

He placed third at the 2023 Diamond League in Silesia, Poland in the men's 100 metres event.

In 2024, he competed in the men's 100 metres event at the Summer Olympics held in Paris, France.

In 2026, he ran a national record of 9.94 to place second in the men's 100 metres at the Rome Diamond League.

He ran a national record and competition record of 9.83 to win the men's 100 metres at the 2026 Commonwealth Games in Glasgow.

== International competitions ==
Year	Competition	Venue	Position	Event	Performance
2022	African Championships	Saint-Pierre	5th	100 m	10.06
2022	African Championships	Saint-Pierre	2nd	200 m	20.61
2022	Commonwealth Games	Birmingham	7th	100 m	10.24
2022	Commonwealth Games	Birmingham	4th	200 m	20.61
2022	Islamic Solidarity Games	Konya	1st	200 m	20.16
2023	Jeux de la Francophonie	Kinshasa	1st	100 m	10.04
2024	2024 World Athletics Indoor Championships	Glasgow	6th	60 m	6.68
2024	African Games	Accra	1st	100 m	10.14
2024	2024 Diamond League	Oslo	3rd	100 m	10.01
2024	African Championships	Douala	2nd	100 m	10.15
2024	African Championships	Douala	3rd	200 m	20.66
2025	Islamic Solidarity Games	Riyadh	1st	200 m	20.55
2026	2026 World Athletics Indoor Championships	Toruń	5th	60 m	6.58
2026	African Championships	Accra	1st	100 m	10.26
2026	Commonwealth Games	Glasgow	1st	100 m	9.83

== Personal bests ==
Event	Performance	Venue	Date
60 metres	6.52 (NR)	Glasgow; Toruń	1 March 2024; 20 March 2026
100 metres	9.83 (NR)	Glasgow	28 July 2026
200 metres	20.23 (NR)	Sotteville-lès-Rouen	7 July 2025

Olympic Games
Preceded by Joseph Essombe; Albert Mengue	Flag bearer for Cameroon; Paris 2024 with Richelle Anita Soppi Mbella	Succeeded by Incumbent
