= Anaso Jobodwana =

South African sprinter (born 1992)

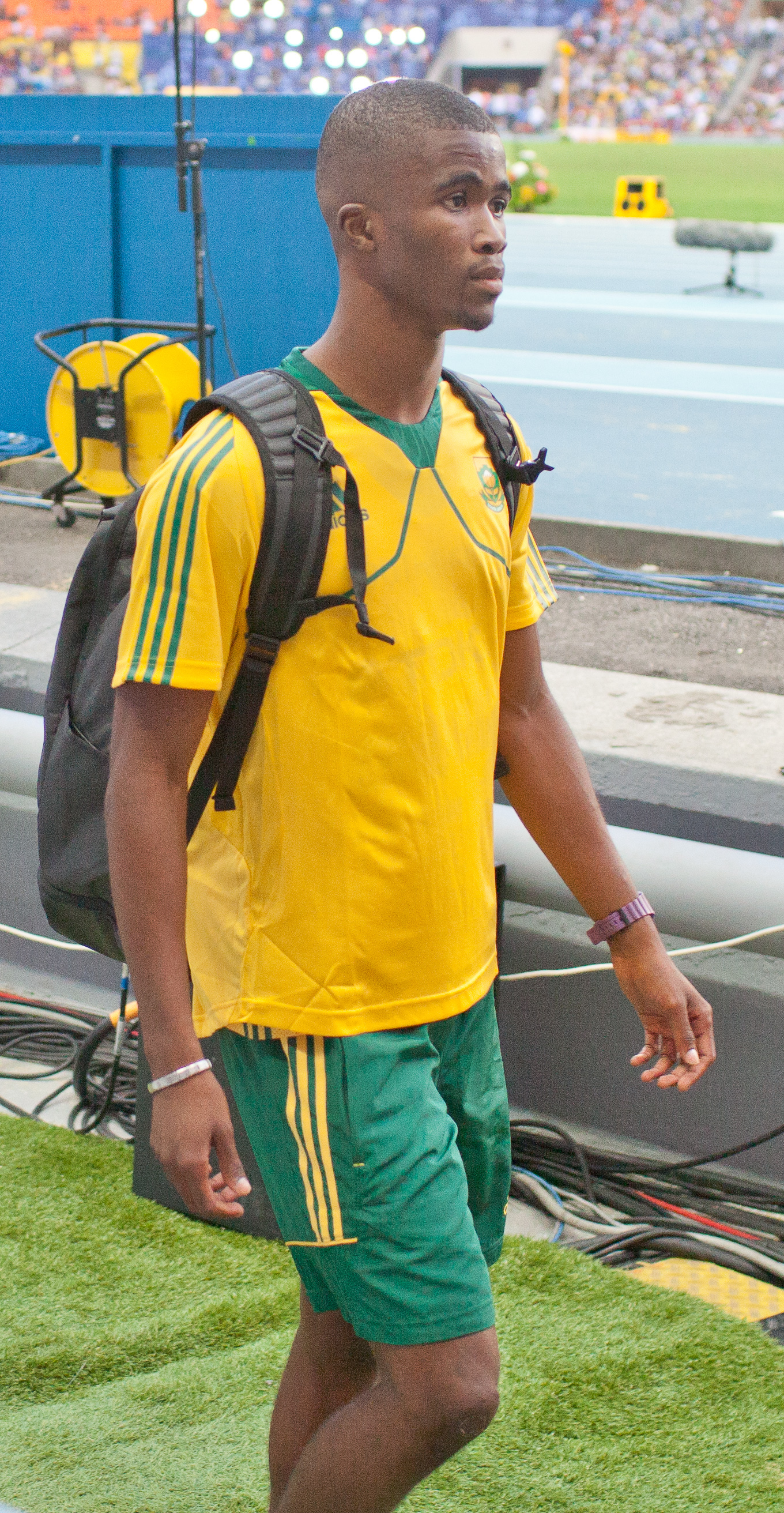
- Anaso Jobodwana in Moscow 2013

Personal information
- Nationality: South African
- Born: 30 July 1992 (age 33) Aberdeen, Eastern Cape, South Africa
- Height: 1.87 m (6 ft 2 in)
- Weight: 71 kg (157 lb)

Sport
- Sport: Track and field
- Event: 200 metres
- College team: Jackson State University -Harvey Gang (Honors College member)
- Coached by: Stuart McMillan

Achievements and titles
- Personal best: 200 m 19.87 (Beijing 2015)
Medal record
World Championships
Bronze medal – third place	2015 Beijing	200 m
World Relays
Silver medal – second place	2019 Yokohama	4×200 m relay
Summer Universiade
Gold medal – first place	2013 Kazan	100 m
Gold medal – first place	2013 Kazan	200 m
Commonwealth Games
Silver medal – second place	2018 Gold Coast	4x100 m
African Games
Bronze medal – third place	2019 Rabat	200 m
Bronze medal – third place	2019 Rabat	4x100 m

Anaso Jobodwana (born 30 July 1992) is a South African sprinter. He competed in 200 metres at the 2012 Summer Olympics in London where he ran a new personal best of 20.27 seconds to reach the final.

In the 2015 World Championships in Beijing, Jobodwana won bronze in the 200m final, with a national record time of 19.87s.

Jobodwana competed in the 200 m at the 2016 Summer Olympics in Rio de Janeiro. He finished 4th in his heat with a time of 20.53 seconds. He did not qualify for the semifinals.

He competed in the men's 200 metres event at the 2020 Summer Olympics.

Athletics Men's 200 Final – 27th Summer Universiade 2013 – Kazan (RUS) Jobodwana takes first
