= Remigio Santander Villarubia =

Equatoguinean sprinter (born 2002)

Personal information
- Born: 9 November 2002 (age 23) Malabo, Equatorial Guinea
- Height: 1.70 m (5 ft 7 in)

Sport
- Sport: Athletics
- Events: 100 metres; 200 metres

Achievements and titles
- Personal best(s): 100m: 11.46 (2023); 200m: 22.81 (2019)

Remigio Santander Villarubia (born 9 November 2002) is an Equatoguinean sprinter. He competed in the men's 100 metres event at the 2024 Summer Olympics.
