= Pius Adome =

Ugandan sprinter (born 1993)

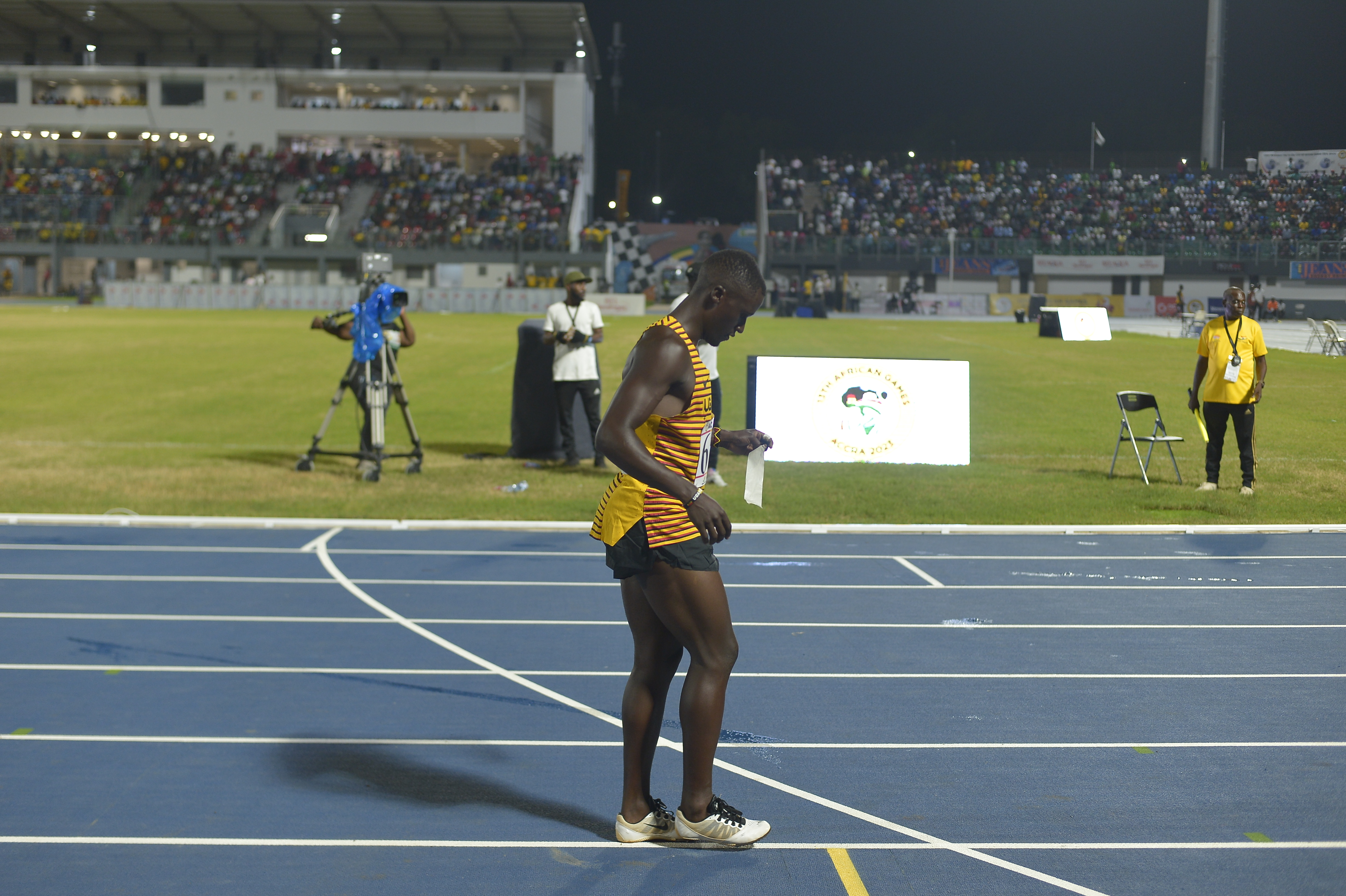

Personal information
- Nationality: Ugandan
- Born: 9 January 1993 (age 33) Tororo, Uganda

Sport
- Country: Uganda
- Sport: Track and field
- Event(s): 100 metres, 200 metres

Achievements and titles
- Personal bests: 100 metres - 10.43 sec NR 200 metres - 20.81 sec

Pius Adome (born 9 January 1993) is a Ugandan sprinter who competed at the 2018 Commonwealth Games. Adome competed in the men's 100 m and men's 200 m sprint events. Adome's 100 m heat consisted of seven runners including Cejhae Greene and Warren Fraser, Adome finished in 5th place with a time of 10.70 seconds finishing ahead of Kolinio Radrudru and Tirioro Willie. Adome's 200 metre heat consisted of eight athletes including silver medalist Aaron Brown. Adome ran the race finishing in 4th place with a time of 21.39 seconds.

On the May 11, 2019 in Kampala, Adome set a new national record in the 100 metre event with a time of 10.43 seconds.
