= List of Democratic Republic of the Congo records in athletics =

The following are the national records in athletics in Democratic Republic of the Congo maintained by DR Congo's national athletics federation: Fédération d'Athlétisme du Congo (FAC).

== Outdoor ==
Key to tables: Awaiting ratification Record not kept by FAC

=== Men ===
Event	Record	Athlete	Date	Meet	Place	Ref.
60 m	6.72 A (+0.8 m/s)	Olivier Mwimba	21 February 2025	A-Bond Inter-High	Pretoria, South Africa	
60 m	6.65 A NWI	Olivier Mwimba	1 February 2025	AGN Track & Field League 2	Pretoria, South Africa	
100 m	10.28 (+1.7 m/s)	Oliver Mwimba	6 March 2021		Sasolburg, South Africa	
100 m	10.25 (+2.0 m/s)	Lionel Muteba	4 June 2024	Royal City Inferno Track and Field Festival	Guelph, Canada	
200 m	20.40 (+0.1 m/s)	Gary Kikaya	12 June 2006		Karlskrona, Sweden	
300 m	31.95	Gary Kikaya	12 June 2005		Villeneuve-d'Ascq, France	
400 m	44.10	Gary Kikaya	9 September 2006	World Athletics Final	Stuttgart, Germany	
800 m	1:50.39	Patrick Tambwé	4 July 2001		Saint-Maur, France	
1500 m	3:42.02	Patrick Tambwé	5 July 2001		Reims, France	
3000 m	7:57.52	Patrick Tambwé	11 June 2002		Sotteville, France	
5000 m	13:49.69	Patrick Tambwé	12 July 2001		Sotteville, France	
10,000 m	28:57.28	Danny Kassap	6 July 2003		Hamilton, Canada	
10 km (road)	29:02	Patrick Tambwé	1 May 2006		Marseille, France	
20 km (road)	58:53	Patrick Tambwé	16 October 2005		Paris, France	
Half marathon	1:03:27	Patrick Tambwé	17 October 2004		Rheims, France	
30 km (road)	1:35:00	Danny Kassap	25 March 2007		Hamilton, Canada	
Marathon	2:08:40	Mwenzé Kalombo	4 April 1999	Paris Marathon	Paris, France	
110 m hurdles	13.95 (+1.0 m/s)	Tino Ngoy	31 May 2002		St. Etienne, France	
400 m hurdles	54.55	Tino Ngoy	22 April 2005		Ypsilanti, United States	
3000 m steeplechase	8:41.92	Patrick Tambwé	29 July 2001		Obernai, France	
High jump	2.16 m	Dieudonné Opata	18 July 1998		Pamplona, Spain	
Pole vault	4.35 m	Florent Lomba	1 March 2015		Réduit, Mauritius	
Long jump	7.64 m	Djéké Mambo	31 August 1997		Heusden, Netherlands	
Long jump	7.64 m (+1.1 m/s)	Jean Kamanda-Mbuyi	9 June 2006		Pierre-Bénite, France	
Triple jump	16.21 m	Djéké Mambo	17 May 1997		Boulogne, France	
Shot put	15.05 m	Kaoto	5 June 1976		Kisangani, Zaire	
Discus throw	44.84 m	Honoré Tunda	15 September 1960		Kinshasa, Zaire	
Hammer throw						
Javelin throw	60.76 m	Otanda Kinimalebo	23 June 1996		Kinshasa, Zaire	
Decathlon	7157 pts	Florent Lomba	12–13 June 2015	TNT – Fortuna Meeting	Kladno, Czech Republic	
Decathlon	100m / Long jump / Shot put / High jump / 400m / 110m H / Discus / Pole vault / Javelin / 1500m; 11.46 (−1.4 m/s) / 7.04 m (+0.2 m/s) / 12.63 m / 1.99 m / 49.80 / 14.65 (−1.7 m/s) / 38.55 m / 4.05 m / 47.96 m / 4:54.09					
20 km walk (road)	1:38:35	Mboyo Harouna	15 September 2015	All-Africa Games	Brazzaville, Republic of the Congo	
50 km walk (road)						
4 × 100 m relay	42.67	Democratic Republic of the Congo; Richard Kombo Mbimbi; Fidele Kitengé; Mafo Tshihinga; M. Kiyana	16 July 2004	African Championships	Brazzaville, Republic of the Congo	
4 × 100 m relay	40.58	Democratic Republic of the Congo; Stone Kabamb Preben; Lionel Muteba; Lasconi Mulamba; Olivier Mwimba	2 August 2023	Jeux de la Francophonie	Kinshasa, Democratic Republic of Congo	
4 × 100 m relay	40.57	Democratic Republic of the Congo; Olivier Mwimba; Lasconi Mulamba; Sasa Esele; Mardoche Kanyinda	19 March 2024	African Games	Accra, Ghana	
4 × 400 m relay	3:20.4	Democratic Republic of the Congo	15 August 2000		Kinshasa, Democratic Republic of the Congo	

=== Women ===
Event	Record	Athlete	Date	Meet	Place	Ref.
100 m	11.86 (+0.9 m/s)	Cynthia Bolingo	21 May 2011	Championnats de Belgique Francophone	Herve, Belgium	
100 m	11.79 (+1.5 m/s)	Victoria Mabiza (Note: citizenship unclear, she opted for France by World Athletics)	6 July 2023		Bron, France	
200 m	24.26 (−0.9 m/s)	Cynthia Bolingo	4 June 2011		Oordegem, Belgium	
400 m	54.88	Maria Bangala	30 April 2022	Music City Challenge	Nashville, United States	
800 m	2:06.17	Noëlly Bibiche Mankatu	23 July 2004		St. Denis, France	
1500 m	4:30.56	Francine Nzilampa	18 August 2009	World Championships	Berlin, Germany	
3000 m	10:13.84	Francine Nzilampa	13 July 2001		Dreux, France	
5000 m	16:32.16 (Note: by official result source; 16:32.2 by World Athletics source)	Ritha Tumaini Nzabava	28 May 2017	Rwanda National Junior Championships	Kigali, Rwanda	
10,000 m	37:39.9	Kungu Bakombo	10 April 1993		Angoulême, France	
Half marathon	1:18:06	Ritha Tumaini Nzabava	4 August 2023	Jeux de la Francophonie	Kinshasa, Democratic Republic of Congo	
Marathon	3:11:14	Ritha Tumaini Nzabava	16 June 2019	Kigaly International Peace Marathon	Kigali, Rwanda	
100 m hurdles	13.97	Cynthia Bolingo	21 May 2011		Herve, Belgium	
400 m hurdles	1:09.44	Clarisse Léma	21 May 2017		Tours, France	
3000 m steeplechase	12:11.53	Clarisse Asifiwe Nzabava	4 August 2023	Jeux de la Francophonie	Kinshasa, Democratic Republic of Congo	
High jump	1.68 m	Mimi Mwema	18 May 1985		Wetzlar, West Germany	
Pole vault						
Long jump	5.88 m	Carine Kanda	13 July 1996		Vénissieux, France	
Triple jump	12.99 m	Carine Kanda	14 July 1996		Vénissieux, France	
Shot put	12.90 m	Amandine Kandi Masakidi	14 June 2011		Romans, France	
Discus throw	30.26 m	Banda Kayembe	18 June 1996		Kinshasa, Zaire	
Discus throw	53.85 m	Yelena Mokoka Sala	2 August 2023	Jeux de la Francophonie	Kinshasa, Democratic Republic of Congo	
Hammer throw	31.62 m	Bintou Kitoko	21 June 1994		Montreuil-sous-Bois, France	
Javelin throw	39.44 m	Céline Kapanda	4–6 August 2015		Kinshasa, Democratic Republic of the Congo	
Heptathlon	4183 pts h	Jeanine Mawit	12–13 May 1990		Orange, United States	
Heptathlon	100m H / High jump / Shot put / 200m / Long jump / Javelin / 800m; 14.9 / 1.39 m / 10.30 m / 26.8 / 5.15 m / 29.66 m / 2:43.8					
20 km walk (road)	2:29:42	Laeticia Mokone Nzala	23/24 June 2007		Kinshasa, Democratic Republic of the Congo	
20 km walk (road)	2:04:54	Gracia Ladisa Munzeza	4 August 2023	Jeux de la Francophonie	Kinshasa, Democratic Republic of Congo	
4 × 100 m relay	51.23	Democratic Republic of the Congo	19 June 2010	Central African Junior Championships	Brazzaville, Republic of the Congo	
4 × 100 m relay	49.15	Democratic Republic of the Congo; Divine Kandomba Elos; Françoise Kumi Bango; Christel Luntadila Mbaku; Raissa Kabedi Kyembo	2 August 2023	Jeux de la Francophonie	Kinshasa, Democratic Republic of Congo	
4 × 400 m relay	4:01.72	Democratic Republic of the Congo; Malonga; Ilunga; P. Mboyibala; Dikivakuaku	20 June 2010	Central African Junior Championships	Brazzaville, Republic of the Congo	

== Indoor ==
=== Men ===
Event	Record	Athlete	Date	Meet	Place	Ref.
60 m	6.81	Olivier Sekanyambo	17 February 2002	Indoor Flanders Meeting	Ghent, Belgium	
60 m	6.77	Lionel Muteba	20 January 2024	University of Ottawa Winter Classic	Ottawa, Canada	
200 m	21.23	Gary Kikaya	18 January 2003	Virginia Tech Elite	Blacksburg, United States	
200 m	20.84 OT	Gary Kikaya	31 January 2004		Lexington, United States	
400 m	45.71	Gary Kikaya	15 March 2003	NCAA Division I Championship	Fayetteville, United States	
800 m	1:55.35	Mukudi Mubenga	12 March 1993	World Championships	Toronto, Canada	
800 m	1:54.95 OT	Makorobondo Salukombo	18 February 2012		Kent, United States	
1500 m	3:53.33	Eduardo Mbengani	28 January 2006		Espinho, Portugal	
3000 m	8:12.74	Eduardo Mbengani	11 February 2007		Pombal, Portugal	
60 m hurdles	7.78	Tino Ngoy	17 January 2004		Ypsilanti, United States	
High jump	2.14 m	Mekomo Masanga	5 December 2015		Eaubonne, France	
High jump	2.21 m	Dieudonné Opota	18 February 2001	Meeting Pas de Calais	Liévin, France	
Pole vault	3.40 m	Boris Fundu-Kiaku	10 February 2013		Reims, France	
Pole vault	3.40 m	Boris Fundu-Kiaku	21 December 2014		Nogent-sur-Oise, France	
Long jump	7.65 m	Jean Kamanda-Mbuyi	26 February 2006		Aubière, France	
Triple jump	16.54 m	Nkosinza Balumbu	15 March 2008		Fayetteville, United States	
Shot put	11.05 m	Ernest Kibungu	9 January 2010		Pombal, Portugal	
Heptathlon	3767 pts	Ernest Kibungu	9–10 January 2010		Pombal, Portugal	
Heptathlon	60m / Long jump / Shot put / High jump / 60m H / Pole vault / 1000m; 7.33 / 5.11 m / 11.05 m / 1.75 m / 9.33 / 2.30 m / 3:08.25					
5000 m walk						
4 × 400 m relay						

=== Women ===
Event	Record	Athlete	Date	Meet	Place	Ref.
60 m	7.57	Cynthia Maduangele Bolingo	29 January 2011		Ghent, Belgium	
60 m	7.53	Victoria Mabiza (Note: citizenship unclear, she opted for France by World Athletics)	25 February 2023	French U18 Championships	Lyon, France	
200 m	24.92	Cynthia Maduangele Bolingo	20 February 2011		Ghent, Belgium	
200 m	24.50	Victoria Mabiza (Note: citizenship unclear, she opted for France by World Athletics)	26 February 2023	French U18 Championships	Lyon, France	
400 m	58.17	Clarisse Lema	28 January 2017		Eaubonne, France	
400 m	57.55 OT	Noelly Mankatu Bibiche	31 January 2004		Murfreesboro, United States	
400 m	55.71 OT	Johanna Bangala	10 January 2020	ETSU Track & Field Invitational	Johnson City, United States	
400 m	57.36	Johanna Bangala	21 February 2020	Mid-South Conference Championship	Defiance, United States	
400 m	57.14	Maria Bangala	4 February 2022		Louisville, United States	
800 m	2:07.62	Noelly Mankatu Bibiche	5 March 2004	World Championships	Budapest, Hungary	
1500 m						
3000 m	9:50.07 OT	Francine Nzilampa	14 January 2017	UW Indoor Preview	Seattle, United States	
60 m hurdles	8.38	Cynthia Bolingo	29 January 2011		Ghent, Belgium	
High jump	1.66 m	Kapinga Dorcas Mutombo	3 February 2007		Eaubonne, France	
Pole vault						
Long jump	5.31 m	Davinhor Makwala	22 March 2014		Nogent-sur-Oise, France	
Long jump	5.31 m	Davinhor Makwala	30 January 2015		Amiens, France	
Triple jump	12.92 m	Carina Kanda	8 February 1997		Liévin, France	
Shot put	11.50 m	Marika Mutombo	9 November 2005		Bordeaux, France	
Pentathlon						
Pentathlon	60m H / High jump / Shot put / Long jump / 800m					
3000 m walk						
4 × 400 m relay						
