= Beatie Deutsch =

American-Israeli marathon runner

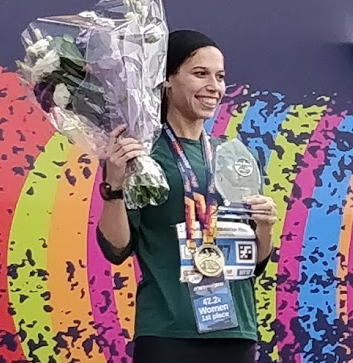
- Deutsch winning the 2019 Tiberias Marathon

Personal information
- Native name: ביטי דויטש
- Full name: Beatrice Rose Deutsch
- Nickname: Speedy Beatie
- Nationality: Israeli / US
- Born: Beatrice Rabin; August 29, 1989 (age 36) Washington, DC, USA
- Home town: Passaic, New Jersey
- Agent: Coachella Media
- Height: 150 cm (4 ft 11 in)
- Website: BeatieDeutsch.com

Sport
- Country: Israel
- Sport: Running
- Events: Marathon, half marathon, 15K run, 10,000 metres, 10K run
- Club: Jerusalem Second Wind Running Club
- Coached by: Etti and Yoram Einar

Achievements and titles
- National finals: 2018 Half Marathon Gold; 2019 Marathon Gold; 2019 15Km Silver; 2019 10,000 meters Silver
Medal record
National Championships
Representing Israel
Gold medal – first place	2018 Beit She'an	Half Marathon
Gold medal – first place	2019 Tiberias	Marathon
Gold medal – first place	2020Tiberias	Marathon
Gold medal – first place	2021Tiberias	Marathon
Gold medal – first place	2022Tiberias	Marathon
Silver medal – second place	2019 Rishon LeZion	15K run
Silver medal – second place	2019 Tel Aviv	10,000 meters
Half Marathon
Gold medal – first place	2019 Tel Aviv	Half Marathon
Silver medal – second place	2019 Jerusalem	Half Marathon
Gold medal – first place	2019 Riga	Half Marathon

Bracha “Beatie” Deutsch (Hebrew: ברכה "ביטי" דויטש; née Rabin; born August 29, 1989) is an American-Israeli marathon runner. She has won the Tiberias Marathon and the Jerusalem Marathon, as well as the Israeli half-marathon and marathon national championships. In 2024, a documentary of her life called Marathon Mom was released.

== Background ==
Deutsch was born in the United States, the oldest of five siblings; grew up in Passaic, New Jersey; and emigrated to Israel in 2008. Her father is a doctor. She has a master's degree in school counseling from Northeastern University, and has attained a black belt in taekwondo.

A religious woman, Deutsch lives in Moshav Neve Michael in central Israel with her husband Michael, a yeshiva teacher and computer science student whom she married in 2009; and their five children. Before she committed herself to running, Deutsch worked full-time as a communication officer for the non-denominational Olami international Jewish outreach organization, which brings college students closer to religion and helps professionals get in touch with their roots by coming to Israel.

== Running career ==
=== 2016–2017 ===
Deutsch began running in 2016 at the age of 25. She runs in a long-sleeved top, below-the-knee skirt, and head scarf, and dedicates her runs to charitable causes.

She ran her first marathon at the Tel Aviv Marathon in 2016, after taking up running only four months earlier, and finished sixth, with a time of 3:27:26.

At the 2017 Tel Aviv Marathon, while seven months pregnant, Deutsch finished with a time of 4:08:16.

=== 2018 ===
In March 2018, Deutsch was the first-placed Israeli in the Jerusalem Marathon and the sixth-placed overall, with a time of 3:09:50, setting a course record for Israeli female runners. Later that year, she won the Israel Half Marathon Championship in Beit She'an, with a time of 1:19:53.

=== 2019 ===
At the Israeli National Championships, Marathon in Tiberias, Deutsch placed first with a time of 2:42:18, the fifth-best result of all time for female Israeli runners.

In May, Deutsch ran her first international race, winning the Riga half marathon, with a time of 1:17:34. In September of that year, Deutsch ran in the Sanlam Cape Town Marathon and finished eighth.

Deutsch trained for the 2020 Olympics and qualified, ranking as one of the top eighty female runners in the world. However, when the Tokyo Olympics was postponed due to COVID-19, the women's marathon moved from a Sunday to a Saturday. She tried to appeal, so she could compete without transgressing her religious beliefs, because the decision moved the race to Shabbat, however, the IOC declined her request. In April 2020, when runners had to requalify for an Olympic spot, Deutsch ran a personal record of 2:31:39 in England, but she did not make the cutoff.

=== 2020 ===
In the Tiberias Marathon held in January 2020, Deutsch won a gold medal and finished in fourth place overall and first place for women with a new personal best of 2:32:25. In the Miami Half-marathon, she won a gold medal with a time of 1:16:49.

=== 2021 ===
At the Cheshire Elite Marathon in the United Kingdom, Deutsch improved her personal marathon record to 2:31:39, placing fifth. At the Israeli Athletics Championships, Deutsch participated in the 800-meter race and came in third, achieving a personal record of 02:10.80.

=== 2022 ===
Deutsch won the women's category of the Tiberias Marathon for the fourth consecutive time in December 2022 with a time of 2:41:20.

== Image ==
In June 2021, Deutsch was included by the sports clothing manufacturer Adidas along with the Russian figure skater Alexandra Trusova, the Indian short-distance runner Hima Das, the South African rugby player Siya Kolisi, and the NBA star Damian Lillard, in a campaign entitled "Impossible is Nothing."

== In popular culture ==
On December 28, 2024, a documentary film about Beatie Deutsch, Marathon Mom, made its debut at the Jerusalem Film Festival. The movie follows Deutsch as she chases her chance to represent Israel at the 2020 Summer Olympics.

In a 2024 Associated Press feature on faith and elite sports, Deutsch said she saw a close connection between running and religious belief. The AP reported that injuries kept her from qualifying for the Paris Games, but that she had resumed training with the next World Championships and the 2028 Summer Olympics in Los Angeles as goals.
