= Congolese records in athletics =

Congolese records in athletics may refer to:

- List of Democratic Republic of the Congo records in athletics
- List of Republic of the Congo records in athletics
