= Ron Cobi =

Israeli politician (born 1972)

- רון אהרון קובי
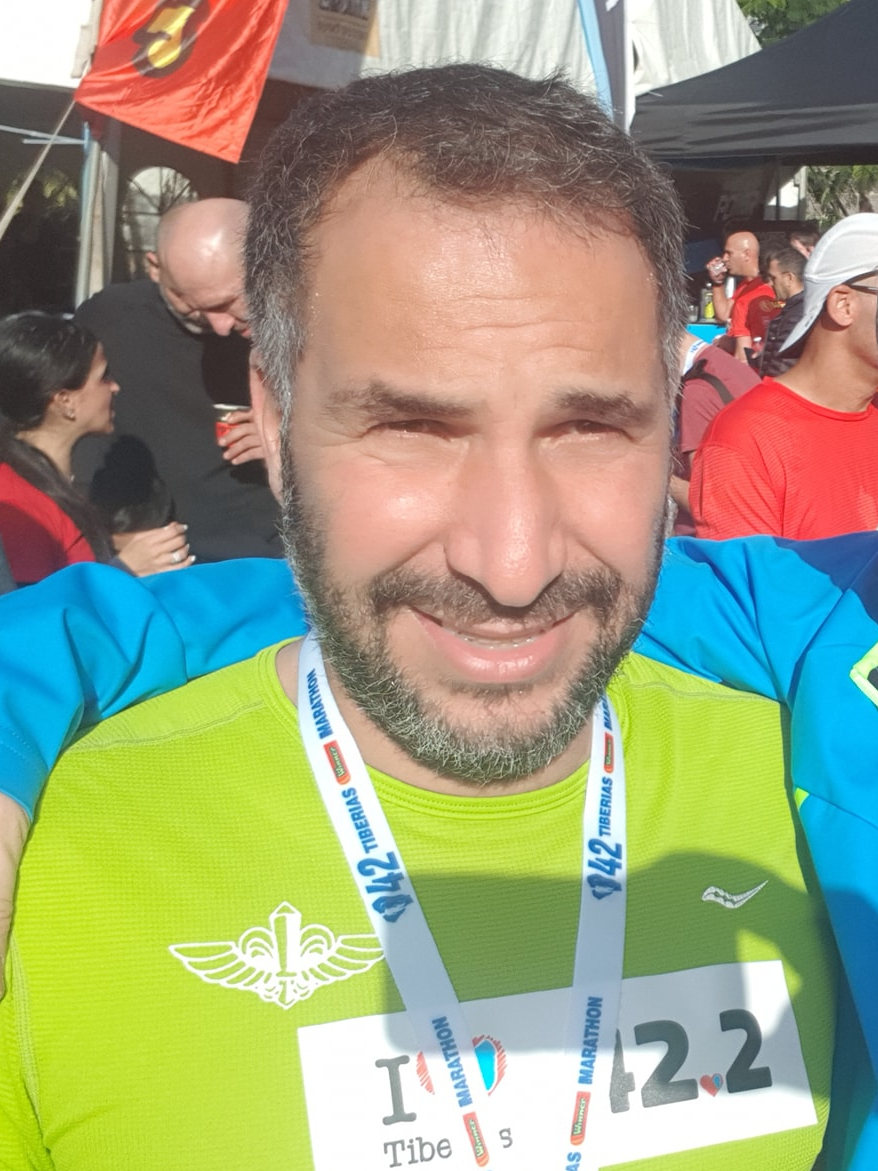
- Ron Cobi at the Tiberias Marathon, 4 January 2019

Mayor of Tiberias
- In office 20 November 2018 – 17 February 2020
- Preceded by: Yossi Ben-David
- Succeeded by: Mooney Ma’atok

Personal details
- Born: 17 January 1972 (age 54) Tiberias
- Party: Rak (Hebrew: רק); Secular Right (Hebrew: הימין החילוני)
- Occupation: Entrepreneur and business man in the field of chemical and energy

Ron Aharon Cobi (Hebrew: רון קובי; born 17 January 1972) is an Israeli politician and former mayor of Tiberias. He gained notoriety and eventually rose to prominence on social media after establishing a forum called "Lifting Tiberias from the Ashes" in an attempt to awaken the public in Tiberias to municipal and social reform through live broadcasts on Facebook. Cobi is known for his hard line against the religious orthodox influence in the city and since his election has led a secular revolution calling for the opening of local businesses and operation of public transportation on the Sabbath.

== Background ==
Ron Cobi was born in Tiberias, Israel in 1972 to Micha and Rina Cobi. He attended "Amal" elementary school in Tiberias. He served in the army as a soldier in the Paratrooper brigade. After the army he attended "Seminar HaKibbutzim" where he majored in education and holds a B.Ed.

Cobi serves as general manager for "Baraka Ltd.", the sole distributor of the global "Shell" corporation in Israel. He is an entrepreneur and businessman in the field of chemicals and energy and has represented international energy companies and a refinery from the United States.

He is the chairman of a fund for Israeli paratroopers and heads a project aimed at helping needy families of the paratrooper brigade. He is also one of the founders of "Ramach" (רמ"ח), which deals with professional medical aid in times of crisis.

Cobi is married to Shirley from Kibbutz Negba and is a father of three.

== Political activity ==
Cobi, with no prior experience in politics, made a name for himself and became known through his social activism and live broadcasts on the Facebook social network. In 2011, he established a Facebook group called "Lifting Tiberias from the Ashes" with the purpose of awakening the Tiberias public to issues concerning the city, such as social issues, environment, and local government. Throughout his activity in this forum he laid out his political platform. In 2012, he was briefly arrested by Tiberias police on suspicion of threatening and harassing the former mayor of Tiberias, Zohar Oved.

In 2013, Cobi ran for mayor against Yossi Ben-David and former Knesset member, Zion Pinian, but did not reach the necessary threshold.

In 2018, he ran for mayor once again against the standing mayor, Yossi Ben-David and Zion Pinian. In an incident which was broadcast live on Facebook, Ben-David was seen hitting Cobi while he was broadcasting outside his office. During his political run, Cobi led a hard line against the Ultra-Orthodox influence in the city. This hard line put him as a target for incitement and violent acts carried out by his opponents. On 30 October 2018, Cobi won the vote against the standing mayor, Yossi Ben-David with 43% of the votes. Cobi ran without funding nor political party support and campaigned mainly via social networks.

A few days after being elected, in an interview for Galei Tzahal radio, Cobi stated that he intends to prevent the "orthodoxing" of Tiberias and fight against housing projects intended for the orthodox community. He also stated that he opposes the expansion of the Haredi (ultra-Orthodox) population in Tiberias, stating "Tiberias cannot pass the 30% mark for Haredim. I want Tiberias to be as it is now – 22% Haredi."

In June 2019, Cobi announced that he was forming a new political party, Secular Right, which would run in the September 2019 Knesset elections.

Cobi was ousted as mayor of Tiberias on 14 January 2020 over his failure to approve a budget, due to disagreements with city council members.
