= Nili Abramski =

Israeli long-distance runner

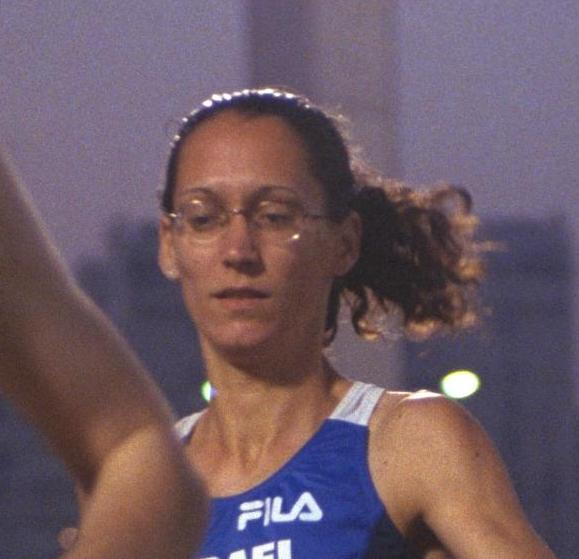

Personal information
- Native name: נילי אברמסקי
- Born: 14 January 1970 Rehovot, Israel

Sport
- Sport: long-distance running

Nili Abramski (Hebrew: נילי אברמסקי; born 14 January 1970) is an Israeli long-distance runner.

== Career highlights ==
Marathons
2004 - Athens, 42nd at 2004 Summer Olympics
2005 - Helsinki, 49th at World Championships
2006 - Gothenburg, 22nd at European Championships
2007 - Osaka, 41st at World Championships
Holds 10 Israeli national marathon titles
Half Marathons
1997 - 8th at World University Games
1997 - Košice, 70th at World Championships
1999 - Palermo, 54th at World Championships
2000 - Veracruz, 44th at World Championships
2001 - Bristol, 48th at World Championships
2002 - Brussels, 39th at World Championships
2005 - Edmonton, 55th at World Championships
Cross Country Races
1997 - Turin, 134th at World Championships (long race)
1999 - Belfast, 80th at World Championships (long race)
Other achievements
Holds 45 other Israeli national titles
She won the Tiberias Marathon 11 times

== Personal bests ==
Distance	Mark	Date	Location
400 m	1:02.14	1989	
800 m	2:13.96	2000	
1000 m	2:56.80	1993	
1500 m	4:25.22	2000	
1 mile	4:46.13	1999	
2000 m	6:08.69	24 August 2000	Wespelaar
3000 m	9:19.52	22 June 2002	Belgrade
5000 m	16:09.88	20 July 2002	Heusden-Zolder
10000 m	33:19.85	3 July 2002	Seraing
Half Marathon	1:13.59	5 May 2002	Brussels
Marathon	2:36.36	4 April 2004	Paris
