= Xhendelesse =

Section of Herve, Wallonia, Belgium

Coordinates: 50°36′N 5°46′E

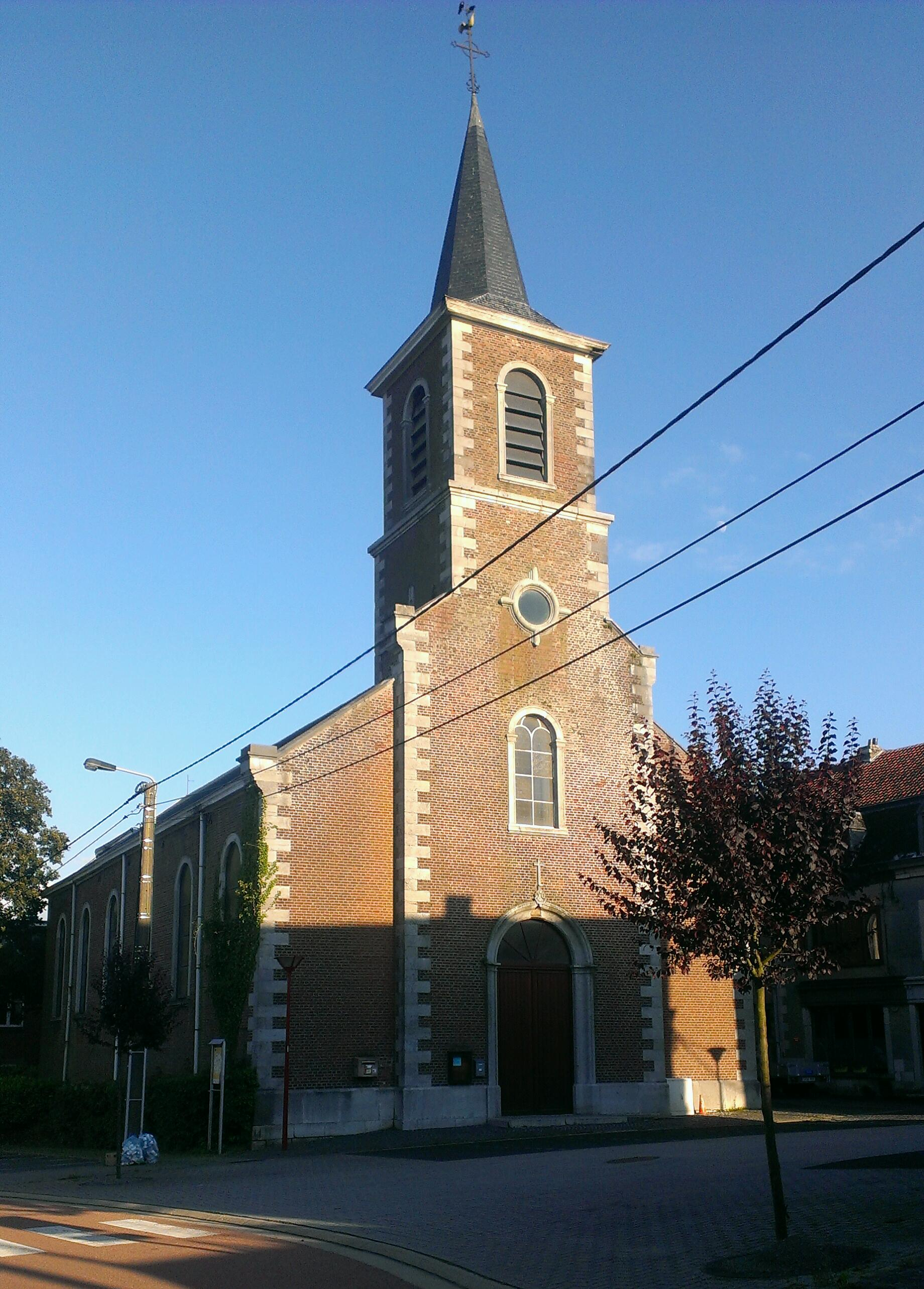
Saint Alexander Church in Xhendelesse, in July 2016.

Xhendelesse (Walloon: Xhindlesse) is a Belgian village and district of the city of Herve, Wallonia, in the province of Liège. It was a separate municipality until the fusion of the Belgian municipalities merged it with Herve in 1977.

The region around Xhendelesse and Herve is famous for its historic nail workshops, small forges where nailmakers cut and hammered nails using square rods produced by nearby slitting mills. In the 17th century, nails produced in the vicinity of Herve were frequently used by the Dutch East India Company in the construction of ships.
