= Secular Right =

Israeli political party

The Secular Right הימין החילוני
- Leader: Ron Cobi
- Founded: 16 June 2019
- Ideology: Zionism; Secularism; Anti-clericalism; Populism
- Political position: Right-wing
- Knesset: 0 / 120

Election symbol
- רק

The Secular Right (Hebrew: הימין החילוני, Hayamin HaHiloni) is a hiloni political party in Israel. It was formed by Tiberias mayor Ron Cobi in June 2019.

== History ==
The Secular Right was formed by Tiberias mayor Ron Cobi amidst a crisis in the creation of a city in his municipal council. Due to the crisis, Ron Cobi may be sacked from his position as mayor of Tiberias and be replaced by a temporary committee. Cobi claimed that he had failed in the creation of a governing coalition due to the intervention of Shas leader and Minister of the Interior Aryeh Deri. On 16 June, Cobi declared that he will run in the September 2019 Israeli legislative election to replace Deri as Minister of the Interior and end Ultra-Orthodox Religious coercion in Israel.

Yisrael Beiteinu Chairman Avigdor Liberman, whose secular right wing platform is similar to that of Cobi, claimed that Cobis' new party was only running as part of a plot by Prime Minister Benjamin Netanyahu to hurt the Yisrael Beiteinu party in retaliation for the failure to establish a government following the last elections. Yisrael Beiteinu petitioned the party registration committee against the registration of the Secular Right party under name. In the petition, Yisrael Beiteinu argued that the new party was a "straw party formed to detract from the votes of Yisrael Beiteinu," and that the name of the party, the "Secular Right," would mislead the public, as Yisrael Beiteinu had embarked on a publicity campaign using the words “right” and “secular” ahead of the last elections. The petition was rejected by the party registration committee.

== Party goals ==
The party's registration papers lay out its goals as such:

=== Separation of church and state ===
- Promotion of public transportation on Shabbat.
- Haredi conscription into the Israeli Defense Force.
- Canceling the "Supermarket law", which prohibits the operation of businesses on Shabbat.

=== Socio economic policies ===
- Construction of public housing.
- Investment in education and the High tech industry.
- Promotion of small businesses.
- Promotion of the Sea of Galilee area, including the construction of a new university.

The party aims to acquire the Ministry of the Interior and the Ministry for the Development of the Periphery, the Negev and the Galilee (both of which are currently in the hands of Shas) to achieve its goals.

== Leaders ==
Leader	Took office	Left office
Ron Cobi	2019	Incumbent
