= List of protected heritage sites in Herve =

This table shows an overview of the protected heritage sites in the Walloon town Herve. This list is part of Belgium's national heritage.

Object	Year/architect	Town/section	Address	Coordinates	Number^{?}	Image
Nazareth Farm: main facade ^{(nl)} ^{(fr)}		Herve	avenue Reine Astrid n°15, Herve	50.644986°N 5.799848°E	63035-CLT-0001-01	
Church of St. John the Baptist ^{(nl)} ^{(fr)}		Herve		50.639594°N 5.794900°E	63035-CLT-0002-01	Kerk van Sint-Jan de Baptist ('Saint-Jean Baptiste') More images
Old fountain behind the building ^{(nl)} ^{(fr)}		Herve	rue Jardon n°11, Herve	50.637358°N 5.793454°E	63035-CLT-0004-01	
Former convent of Récollectines: walls and roofs, and building of monastery chapel and monastery interior ^{(nl)} ^{(fr)}		Herve	rue Haute, Herve	50.642816°N 5.796081°E	63035-CLT-0005-01	Voormalig klooster van Récollectines: gevels en daken, kapel en gebouw van klooster en kloosterinterieur
Church of Saint-Apollinaire ^{(nl)} ^{(fr)}		Herve		50.661880°N 5.762429°E	63035-CLT-0008-01	Kerk Saint-Apollinaire More images
Chapel of Our Lady of Noble Haye ^{(nl)} ^{(fr)}		Herve		50.651019°N 5.763270°E	63035-CLT-0010-01	
The castle-farm of Bolland and the church and park ^{(nl)} ^{(fr)}		Herve		50.661937°N 5.761736°E	63035-CLT-0011-01	Het kasteel en de boerderij van Bolland en het ensemble van het kasteel, de boerderij, de kerk en het park
The castle-farm of Bolland and the church and park ^{(nl)} ^{(fr)}		Herve	Bolland	50.663727°N 5.755069°E	63035-CLT-0012-01	Ensemble van het kasteel, boerderij, kerk en park More images
Noblehaie farmhouse ^{(nl)} ^{(fr)}		Herve	Noblehaie n°104, Bolland	50.650800°N 5.764317°E	63035-CLT-0013-01	
Chaineux village ^{(nl)} ^{(fr)}		Herve	Village n°260-261, Chaineux	50.633804°N 5.826949°E	63035-CLT-0015-01	
house ^{(nl)} ^{(fr)}		Herve	Grand Vinâve 30, Charneux	50.668708°N 5.804613°E	63035-CLT-0016-01	Gebouw
Church Saint-Sébastien ^{(nl)} ^{(fr)}		Herve	Charneux	50.669461°N 5.805118°E	63035-CLT-0018-01	Kerk Saint-Sebastien
Farmhouse ^{(nl)} ^{(fr)}		Herve	rue de la Sauvenière n°116	50.671366°N 5.790367°E	63035-CLT-0020-01	
Farmhouse ^{(nl)} ^{(fr)}		Herve	rue de la Halle n°18, Grand-Rechain	50.606265°N 5.809936°E	63035-CLT-0021-01	
"Père Eternel" house ^{(nl)} ^{(fr)}		Herve	rue Jardon n°88, Herve	50.637600°N 5.790131°E	63035-CLT-0022-01	Gebouw genaamd "Père Eternel": gevels, daken en bordes
Old house ^{(nl)} ^{(fr)}		Herve	Renouprez n°283, Herve	50.670535°N 5.827431°E	63035-CLT-0023-01	
The chapel of Sainte-Agathe ^{(nl)} ^{(fr)}		Herve		50.633767°N 5.830028°E	63035-CLT-0024-01	De kapel van Sainte-Agathe en het ensemble van het gebouw met zijn omgeving
Old house ^{(nl)} ^{(fr)}		Herve	rue Leclercq n°66	50.642218°N 5.797347°E	63035-CLT-0025-01	
Old house ^{(nl)} ^{(fr)}		Herve	Halleux n°341	50.673622°N 5.819827°E	63035-CLT-0026-01	
Gerardy farmhouse ^{(nl)} ^{(fr)}		Herve	n°58, Houlteau	50.630264°N 5.843228°E	63035-CLT-0027-01	
Old house ^{(nl)} ^{(fr)}		Herve	rue d'Elvaux n°7, Herve	50.638959°N 5.794425°E	63035-CLT-0028-01	Gevels en totaliteit van het dak van het huis
Havremont farmhouse ^{(nl)} ^{(fr)}		Herve	Sarémont 12 (formerly called Havremont rue Grétry 140), Bolland	50.656447°N 5.775922°E	63035-CLT-0029-01	
Old house ^{(nl)} ^{(fr)}		Herve	avenue des Platanes n°156, Grand-Rechain	50.607804°N 5.810886°E	63035-CLT-0030-01	
Old house ^{(nl)} ^{(fr)}		Herve	Es Bosse n°255, Chaîneux	50.637759°N 5.831650°E	63035-CLT-0031-01	
house ^{(nl)} ^{(fr)}		Herve	Grand Vinâve 11, Charneux	50.669210°N 5.805716°E	63035-CLT-0032-01	
Farmhouse ^{(nl)} ^{(fr)}		Herve	Holiguette 220, Charneux	50.695095°N 5.796939°E	63035-CLT-0033-01	
"Le Prieuré" house ^{(nl)} ^{(fr)}		Herve	rue du Village n°276, Chaineux	50.633763°N 5.834607°E	63035-CLT-0034-01	
Farmhouse ^{(nl)} ^{(fr)}		Herve	Xhéneumont n°7-8, Battice	50.637221°N 5.815562°E	63035-CLT-0035-01	
Old house ^{(nl)} ^{(fr)}		Herve	rue du Marché n°16, Herve	50.641131°N 5.795654°E	63035-CLT-0036-01	Straatgevel, dak, de trap en twee open haarden in het huis
Organ of A. Clerinx in Saint-Gilles ^{(nl)} ^{(fr)}		Herve	Chaineux	50.631731°N 5.834644°E	63035-CLT-0038-01	
The facades and roofs of the two parts of the 18th century, Maria Theresia College ^{(nl)} ^{(fr)}		Herve	rue du Collège 26, Herve	50.639137°N 5.795451°E	63035-CLT-0039-01	De gevels en daken van de twee delen van het 18e eeuw Maria Theresia College, in Herve
ancient abbey of Val-Dieu and the surrounding area ^{(nl)} ^{(fr)}		Herve		50.699048°N 5.805559°E	63035-CLT-0041-01	Ensemble van gebouwen van de oude abdij van Val-Dieu en de omliggende terreinen, te Charneux
Forest Moraithier ^{(nl)} ^{(fr)}		Herve		50.593048°N 5.790042°E	63035-CLT-0042-01	
Border marker called "Belle Pierre" ^{(nl)} ^{(fr)}		Herve		50.617218°N 5.764576°E	63035-CLT-0043-01	Oude grenspaal genaamd "Belle Pierre", op het aquaduct boven de stroom met de naam "ruisseau du Pont Clory"

== See also ==
- List of protected heritage sites in Liège (province)
- Herve
