= Bolland Castle =

Castle in Liège Province, Belgium

Coordinates: 50.661°N 5.761°E

- Château de Bolland (French)
- Wallonia, Belgium
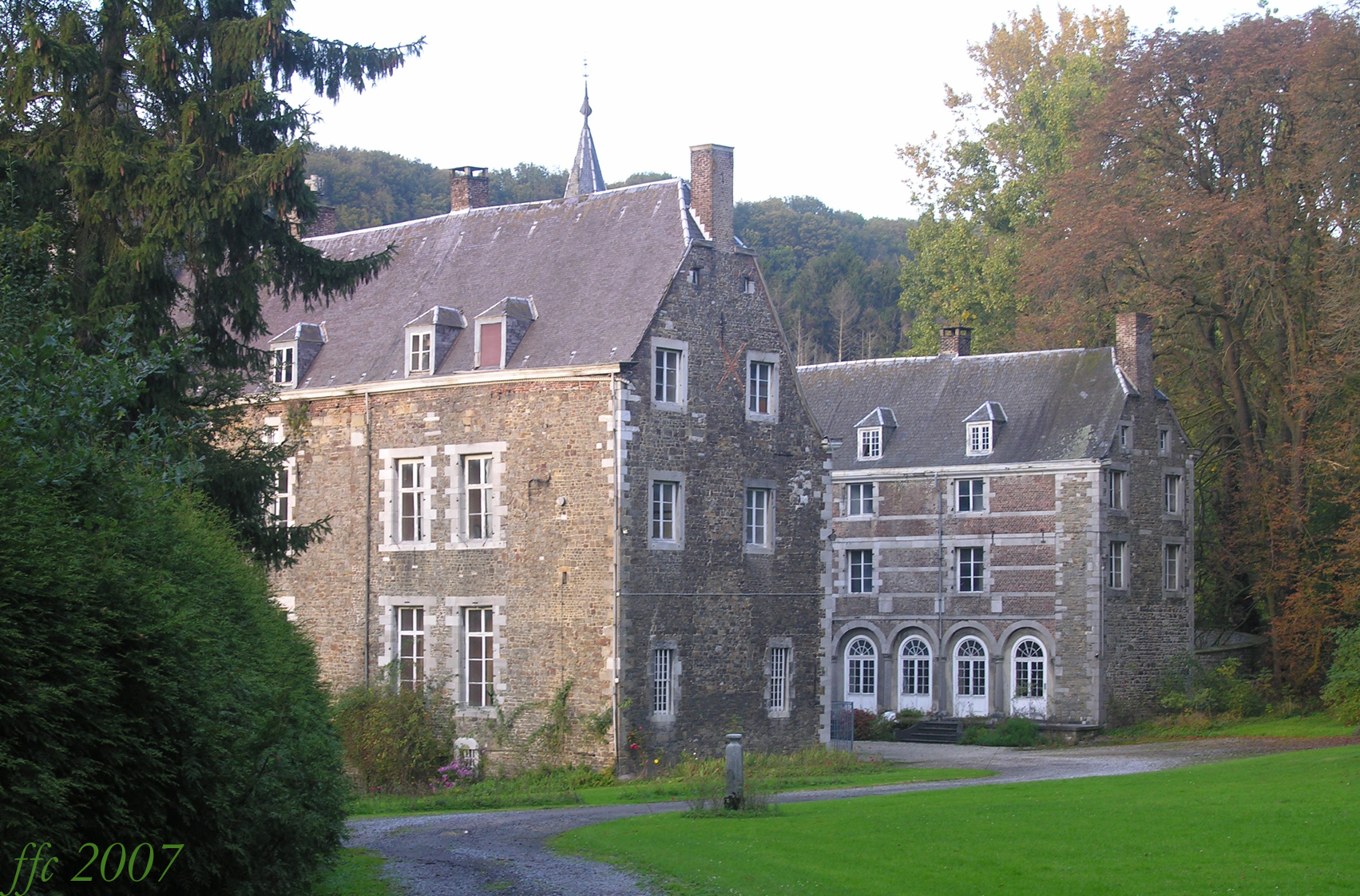

Site information
- Type: Castle

Bolland Castle (French: Château de Bolland) is a castle in the municipality of Herve, Liège Province, Wallonia, Belgium.

The keep remains from the medieval building, and several other parts from the 16th century. Major works were carried out in the 17th century.

The medieval owners were the d'Houffalize and Brandenberg families, followed in the 16th-17th centuries by those of d'Eynatten, Berlo and Groesbeek. The de Lannoys acquired it in the 17th century and retained it until the 19th, when it became the property of the de Berlaymonts. Baron Adhemar de Royer de Dour de Fraula acquired it from them in 1920, and his descendants still live there.

The castle was once surrounded by a moat. Nearby there were also formerly the remains of a convent of Recollects founded in the 17th century by Jean de Berlo, lord of Bolland, and his wife Marguerite d'Eynatten.

== See also ==
- List of castles in Belgium

== Sources ==
- BelgianCastles.br: Bolland
