= Hacboister =

Coordinates: 50°40′N 5°45′E

Hacboister is a hamlet of the municipality of Herve, Wallonia, district of Bolland, located in the province of Liège, Belgium.

It is 10 kilometres (6.2 mi) east of Herstal.
