= Tsegaye Segne =

Ethiopian long-distance runner

Medal record

Men's athletics

Representing Ethiopia

African Championships
Gold medal – first place	1989 Lagos	Marathon

Tsegaye Segne (born 1964) is an Ethiopian former long-distance runner who specialised in the marathon. He was the gold medallist in the event at the 1989 African Championships in Athletics, crossing the line in Lagos in a time of 2:26:26 hours ahead of world medallist Kebede Balcha.

He won the Tel Aviv Marathon in 1991 with a time of 2:19:50 hours and set his career best for the distance of 2:15:16 hours to win the 1993 Addis Ababa Marathon.
