= Patrick Tambwé =

Congolese-born French long-distance runner

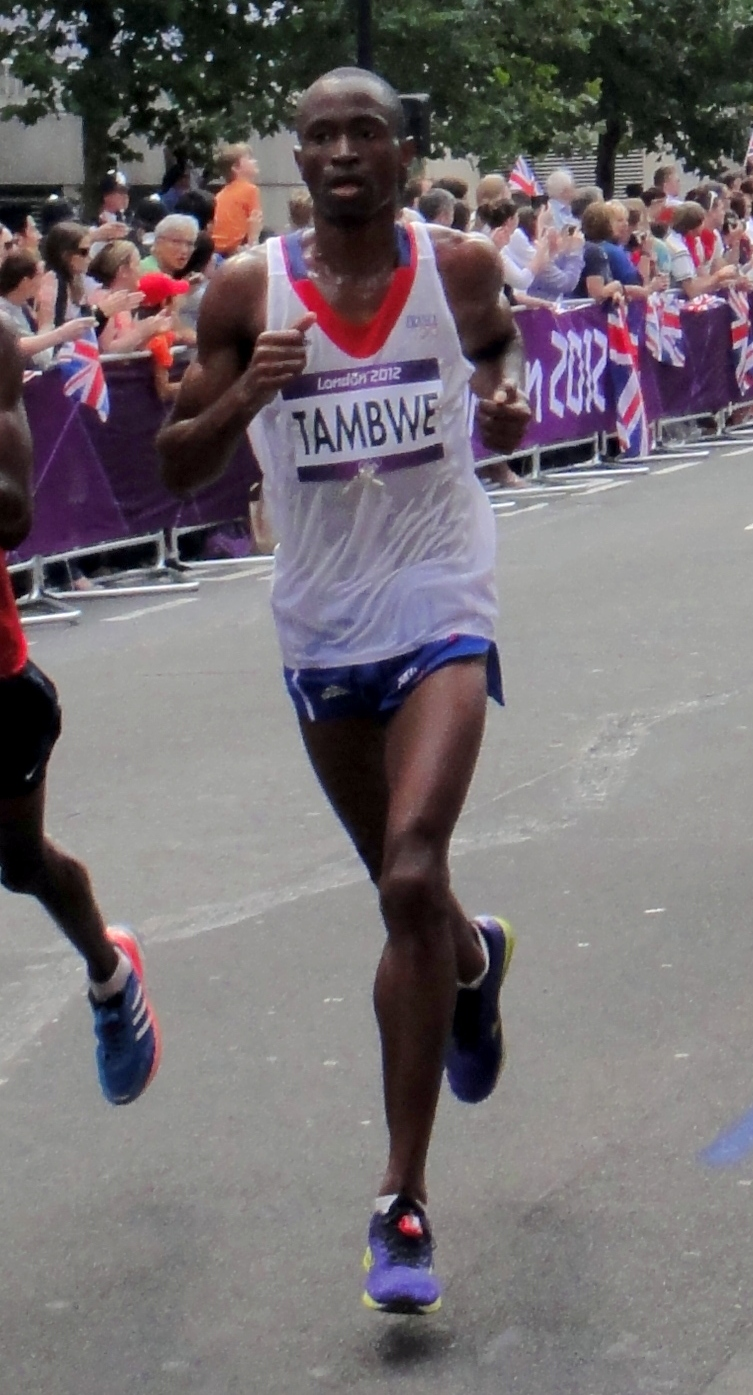

Personal information
- Nationality: DR Congolese; French (since 2011)
- Born: 5 May 1975 (age 51)
- Height: 1.82 m (5 ft 11 1/2 in)
- Weight: 68 kg (150 lb)

Sport
- Country: France
- Sport: Athletics
- Event: Marathon

Patrick Tambwé (born 5 May 1975 in Kinshasa) is a Congolese-born French long-distance runner. At the 2012 Summer Olympics, he competed in the Men's marathon, but did not finish.

He twice represented the Democratic Republic of Congo in the marathon at the World Championships in Athletics, but failed to finish on either occasion. He is the DR Congo national record holder in nine events, including the half marathon, marathon and 5000 metres. He gained French nationality in 2011 and was the marathon gold medallist at the 2011 Military World Games.

== Career ==
=== Early career ===
Born in Kinshasa, he made two international appearances for his native country at the World Championships in Athletics, running the marathons in 1997 and 1999, although he failed to finish in either race. He broke four DR Congo national records on the track in the 2001 season, recording 1:50.39 minutes for the 800 metres, 3:42.02 minutes for the 1500 metres, and 13:49.69 minutes for the 5000 metres flat, as well as 8:41.92 minutes for the 3000 metres steeplechase. He won the Le Havre marathon that year in a time of 2:16:25 hours. A 3000 metres flat national record of 7:57.52 minutes came in June 2002. For that year onwards he began to focus more on road running events, principally in France. He made four appearances in the marathon in 2002, coming 20th at the Paris Marathon, fifth at the Reims Marathon, and gaining victories in Cancale and Caen.

=== French Foreign Legion ===
Tambwé set a half marathon national record of 63:06 minutes at the Clichy sur Seine Half Marathon – that year he signed up with the French Foreign Legion, joining the 40eRA Suippes regiment. He was allowed to continue with his running and in 2004 he was fourth at the Humarathon half, won the French half marathon title, set a DR Congo record of 2:08:55 hours to win the Mont St. Michel Marathon, then ran 2:10:11 hours for fourth at the high-profile New York City Marathon. He clocked a 20 km road national record of 58:53 minutes en route to a sixth-place finish at the 2005 Paris Marathon. The next year he managed only twentieth place at that race, but had a personal best and national record of 29:02 minutes in the 10K run in Marseille. He represented his club, Lille Métropole Athlétisme, at the European Champion Clubs Cup Cross Country and made three outings in the marathon, winning the Guldensporen Marathon, coming fourth in 2:15:29 at the Brussels Marathon and seventh at the Singapore Marathon (his first Asian race).

His 2008 season was highlighted by a third career win at the Mont St. Michel Marathon and a marathon win in Tahiti. He returned to win again in Tahiti in 2009, but was only eleventh at the Zurich Marathon. His last ever outing for DR Congo was at the 2011 Tiberias Marathon, where he placed second in a time of 2:10:09 (his second fastest at that point). From April 2011 he began running for France, having earned citizenship through the Foreign Legion. He was ninth at the Kuala Lumpur Marathon, but managed to win his first international medal at the 2011 Military World Games, taking the marathon gold medal for France.

=== 2012 Olympic performance ===
Keen to earn a spot on the French team for the 2012 Summer Olympics, he entered the Tiberias Marathon for a second year running and this time came out as winner, narrowly beating Francis Kibiwott Larabal and setting a personal best of 2:07:30 hours. This was an "A" standard time and at the age of 37 he made his Olympic debut in the marathon. However, in his third top level performance in the distance, he again failed to finish the race. Nevertheless, his time from the Tiberias Marathon ranked him as Europe's top marathon runner that year.

He struggled to regain his form and failed to finish the Daegu Marathon in 2013, ran 2:21:02 for 19th at the 2014 Hong Kong Marathon, then failed to finish at the Santiago de Chile Marathon in April.
