= Lindsay Robertson =

British marathon runner

Lindsay Robertson (born 28 June 1958) is a former British marathon runner.

In 1984, 1985 and 1987 he won the Tiberias Marathon and in 1987 the Frankfurt Marathon with his personal best of 2:13:30 h.

== Achievements ==
- All results regarding marathon, unless stated otherwise

Year	Competition	Venue	Position	Notes
Representing United Kingdom
1987	Frankfurt Marathon	Frankfurt, Germany	1st	2:13:30
