= Tel Aviv Marathon =

Marathon race

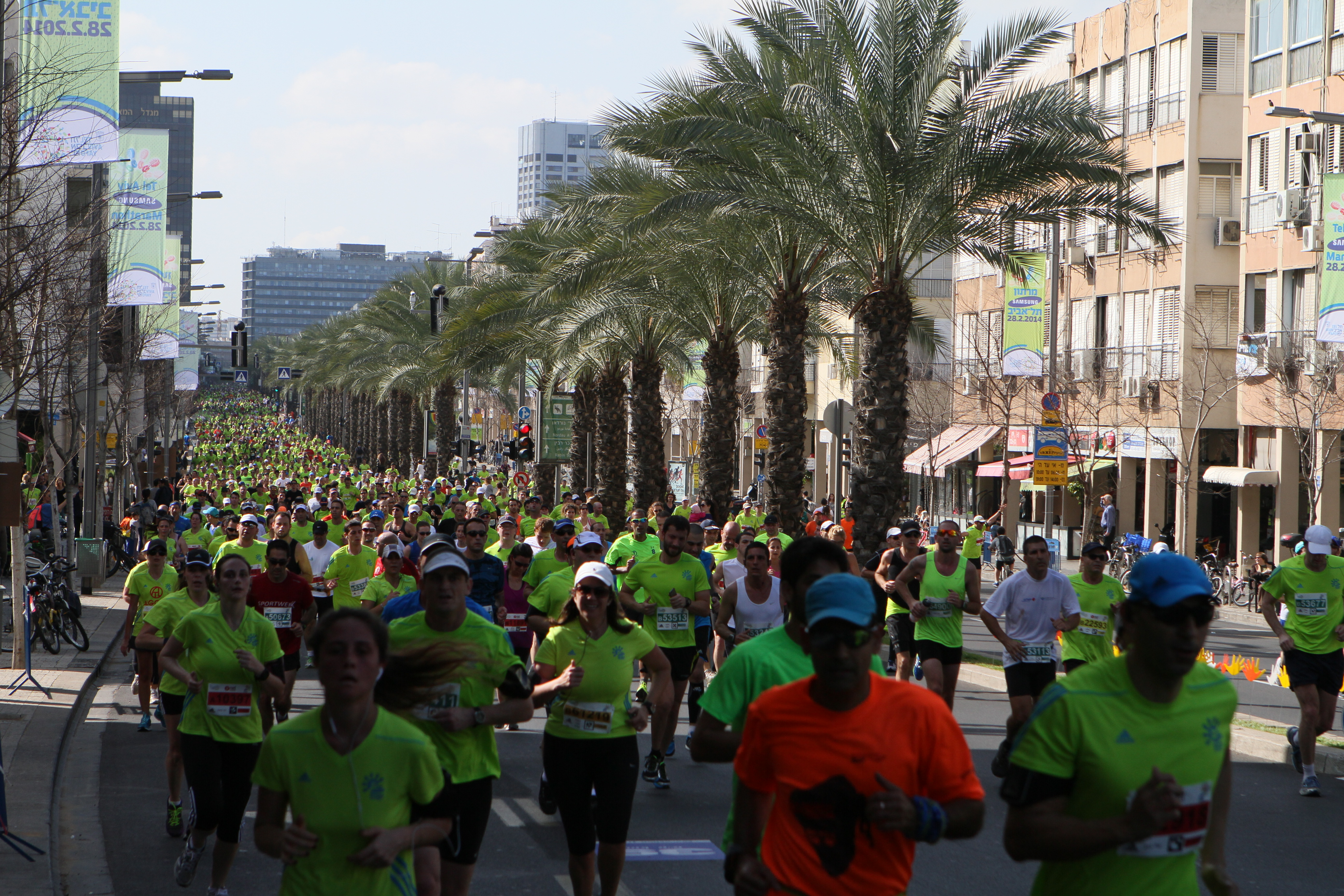
- Date: February
- Location: Tel Aviv, Israel
- Event type: Road
- Distance: Marathon
- Primary sponsor: Samsung
- Established: 1981
- Course records: Men: 2:10:11 (Kenya) Dominic Kipngeno Mibei (2023); Women: 2:35:20 (Ethiopia) Baraki Gebriala (2026)
- Website: Tel Aviv Marathon
- Participants: 2,419 finishers (2026); 1,505 (2022); 2,181 (2020)

The Tel Aviv Marathon is a major marathon held annually in Tel Aviv, Israel, in February. Inaugurated in 1981, it was held annually until 1994. In 2009, it was revived and has been taking place annually since, attracting about 40,000 runners in 2022. The race was not held in 2021 due to the COVID-19 pandemic and a digital event was held instead.

== History ==
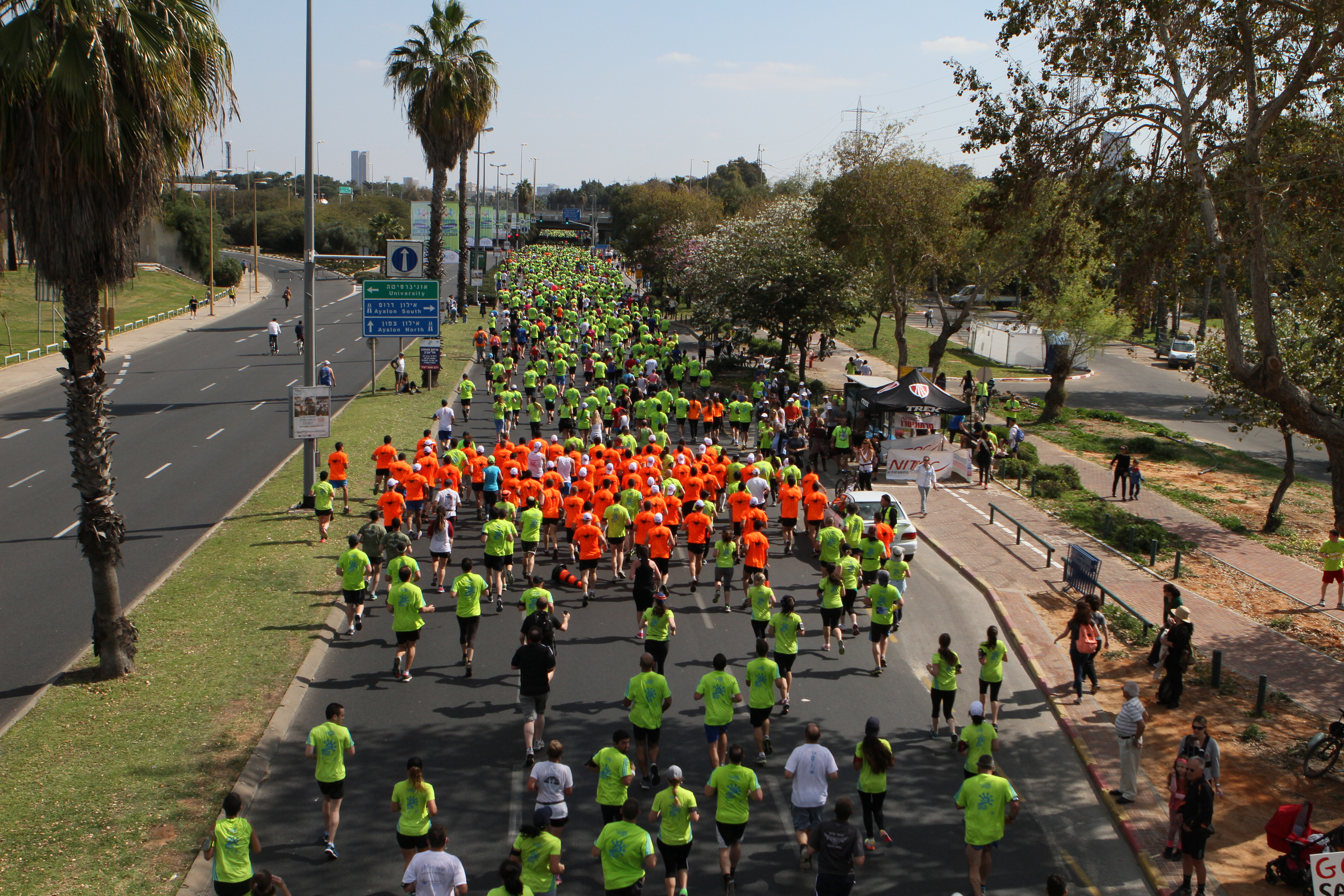
Tel Aviv marathon, 2014

The marathon is one of Tel Aviv's core annual international events. The Tel Aviv Marathon is a multi-course event allowing both professional and hobbyist runners to take part. The event includes an Inline Skating Half Marathon, and a 30 km Handcycle race for people with special needs. Marathon runners run along the seashore and main streets of Tel Aviv, an official UNESCO World Heritage Site.

Some 35,000 runners were expected to take part in the 2013 marathon, with a range of different courses on offer. Due to unexpectedly high temperatures, the marathon did not take place as originally scheduled on March 15, 2013. Other races scheduled as part of the event, including the half marathon, 10 km races, 4.2 km race, and children's race did take place, but started earlier in the day than originally scheduled. Despite the precautions, one runner died, and twelve others were seriously injured.

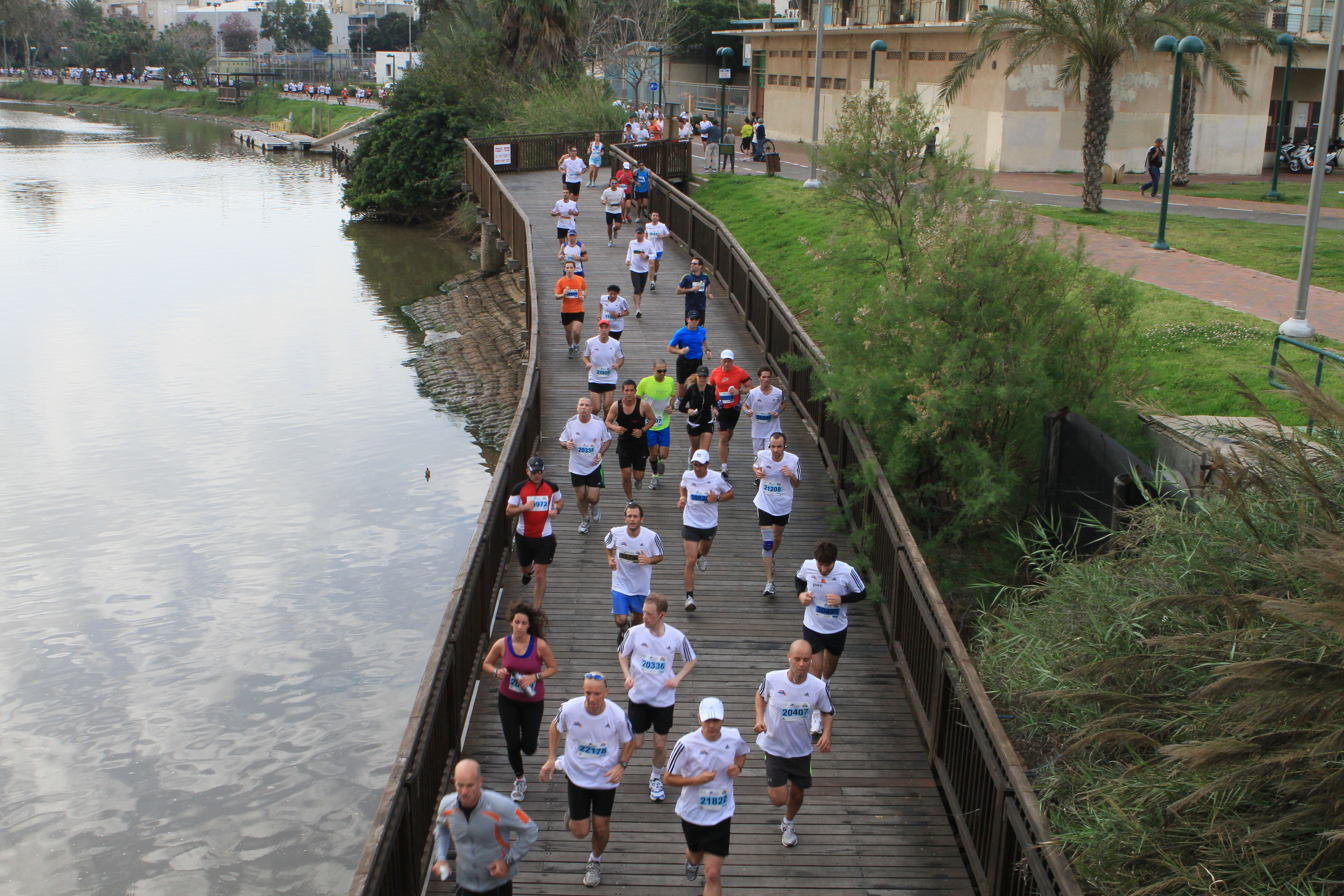
Tel Aviv Marathon, 2011

For the 2020 edition of the marathon, although foreigners were initially banned from competing due to concerns regarding the coronavirus pandemic, the Ministry of Health partially lifted the ban days before the competition and allowed "diplomats, foreign residents, and international residents" that were already in Israel to participate in the marathon.

In 2021, the marathon did not take place due to the coronavirus pandemic. Instead, a virtual event was held, using a dedicated app which remained available for a week and a half to allow runners to choose a time and location of their choice and receive information on their distance and running time in the app.

In 2026, the Tel Aviv Marathon took place on late February with approximately 50,000 participants-one of the largest turnouts in the event's history. During the event, 35 runners received medical treatment at Sourasky Medical Center's on-site tent for issues including heatstroke, general weakness, arrhythmia, and orthopedic injuries; five were reported in critical condition due to heatstroke, and six required hospital admission.

=== Course records ===
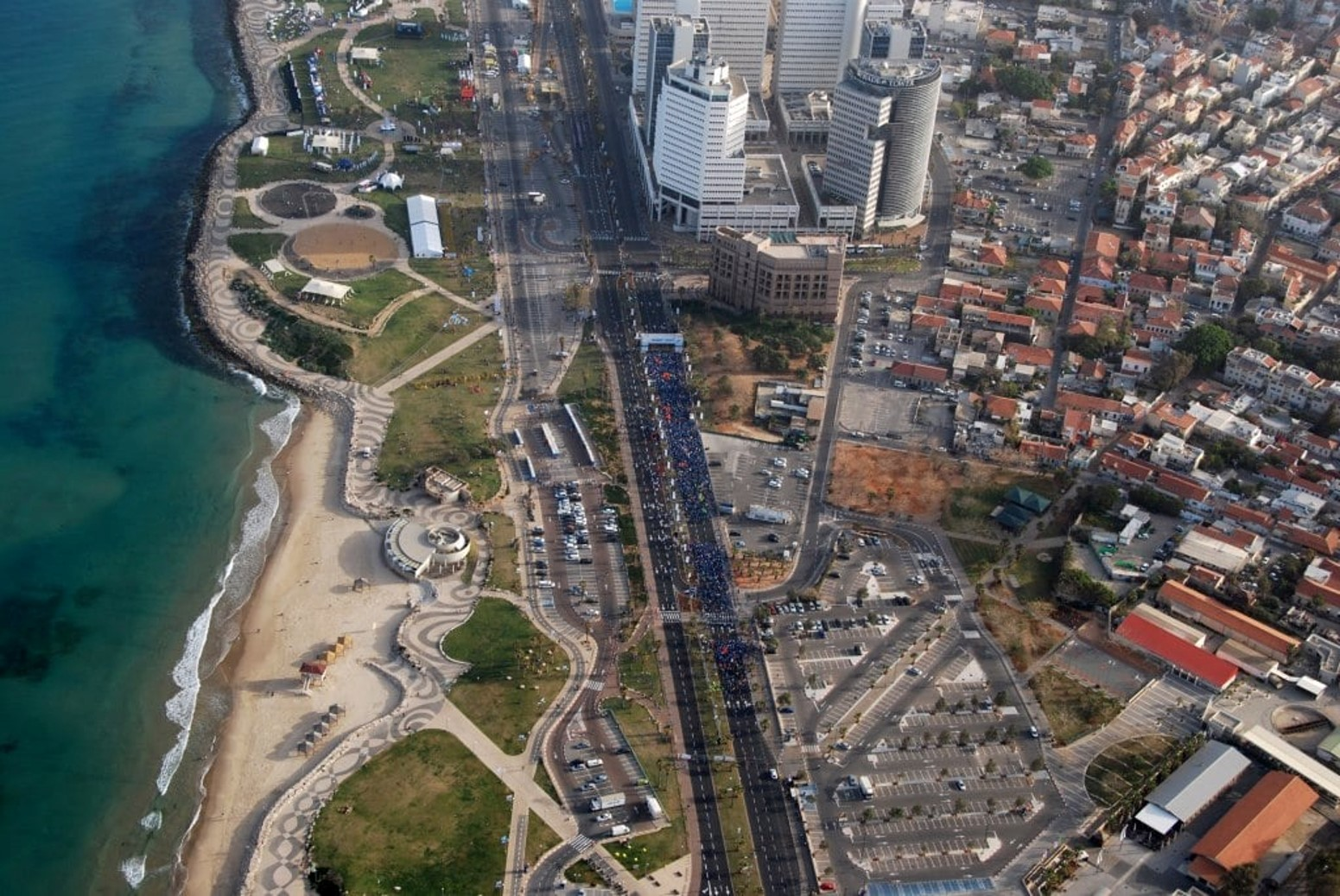
Tel Aviv Marathon, aerial view, 2022

The men's Marathon course record is 2:10:11, set in the 2023 edition by Dominic Kipngeno Mibei of Kenya.

The Israeli men's course record is 2:21:19, set in the 2025 edition by Tesama Moogas.

The men's Half marathon course record is 1:02:21, set in the 2025 edition by Maru Teferi of Israel.

The men's 10 km course record is 28:52, set in the 2026 edition by Godadaw Belachew of Israel.

The women's course record is 2:35:20, set in the 2026 edition by Baraki Gebriala of Ethiopia.

The Israeli women's course record is 2:51:23, set in the 2020 edition by Irene-Orr Konovalov.

The women's Half marathon course record is 1:09:51, set in the 2022 edition by Buzunesh Getachew of Ethiopia.

The women's 10 km course record is 30:54, set in the 2023 edition by Yalemget Yaregal of Ethiopia.

=== Past winners ===
Key: Course record

Date	Men's winner	Time	Women's winner	Time	Refs
27 Feb 2026	Dickson Simba Nyakundi (KEN)	2:10:14	Baraki Gebriala (ETH)	2:35:20	
28 Feb 2025	Felix Kimutai (KEN)	2:12:12	Teresiah Omosa (KEN)	2:37:37	
2024	Did not held				
24 Feb 2023	Dominic Kipngeno Mibei (KEN)	2:10:11	Margaret Njuguna (KEN)	2:42:40	
25 Feb 2022	Vincent Rono (KEN)	2:12:55	Mintamir Bikaya (ISR)	2:53:01	
2021	Virtual event				
27 Feb 2020	Tobias Singer (GER)	2:31:01	Elena Tolstykh (RUS)	2:44:17	
22 Feb 2019	Samuel Demie (ETH)	2:14:31	Margaret Njuguna (KEN)	2:40:26	
23 Feb 2018	Ernest Kebenei (KEN)	2:19:53	Margaret Njuguna (KEN)	2:58:18	
24 Feb 2017	Belete Mekonen (ETH)	2:12:12	Margaret Njuguna (KEN)	2:35:51	
26 Feb 2016	William Yegon (KEN)	2:10:50	Lonah Chemtai (KEN)	2:40:16	
27 Feb 2015	William Yegon (KEN)	2:10:30	Azeb Weldehawariat (ETH)	2:51:24	
28 Feb 2014	Ezekiel Kiprop (KEN)	2:14:40	Margaret Njuguna (KEN)	2:44:23	
2013	Did not held				
30 Mar 2012	Samuel Tarus (KEN)	2:15:15	Abeba Tolla (ETH)	2:38:27	
08 Apr 2011	Josphat Rono (KEN)	2:19:02	Worknesh Shashe (ETH)	2:40:35	
14 May 2010	Avraham Hailemelkot (ISR)	2:49:34	Orna Blau (ISR)	3:13:30	
24 Apr 2009	Daniel Kipchumba (KEN)	2:38:06	Orna Blau (ISR)	3:07:41	
1995–2008	Did not held				
15 Mar 1994	Gezahenge Birra (ETH)	2:19:37	Czesława Mentlewicz (POL)	2:40:44	
15 Mar 1993	Aiduna Aitnafa (ETH)	2:21:37	Cinzia Allasia (ITA)	3:10:57	
16 Mar 1992	Tumo Turbo (ETH)	2:14:56	Alina Magamedirova (RUS)	2:47:47	
15 Apr 1991	Tsegaye Segne (ETH)	2:19:50	Loredana Ricci (ITA)	2:58:12	
15 Mar 1990	Hannu Korkalainen (FIN)	2:30:32	Loredana Ricci (ITA)	3:20:12	
16 Mar 1989	Osmiro Silva (BRA)	2:13:23*	Czesława Mentlewicz (POL)	2:53:18*	
06 Mar 1988	Jean-Claude Louison (FRA)	2:22:21	Adriana Barbu (ROM)	2:44:03	
19 Mar 1987	Michel Constant (FRA)	2:23:27	Erika Kruger (FRG)	3:26:28	
03 Mar 1986	Michel Schwind (FRA)	2:30:05	Elena Murgoci (ROM)	2:49:32	
07 Mar 1985	Jean-Michel Charbonnel (FRA)	2:23:06	Lise Kristiansen (DEN)	3:01:27	
19 Mar 1984	Gheorghe Sandu (ROM)	2:27:05	n/a	---	
28 Feb 1983	Alan Mc Gay (GBR)	2:22:34	n/a	---	
09 Mar 1982	Yves Seigneuric (FRA); Claude Minni (FRA)	2:26:56	Navah Ezra (ISR)	4:31:15	
19 Mar 1981	Jean-Michel Charbonnel (FRA)	2:35:47	Zahava Eliasi (NED)	4:02:51	

Notes: 1981 was the inaugural year. The course used for the 1989 race was 1,750 m too short, due to marking mistakes. https://arrs.run/HP_TelAvivMa.htm

=== Prize Money (ADR qualified runners) ===
Year	Men	Woman	Total
2012	$9,240	$5,600	$14,840
2011	8,710	8,710	17,420
2009	1,000	1,750	2,750
Sums	$18,950	$16,060	$35,010

=== Quality Performances ===
Men	
<2:15	28

Women	
<2:40	10

== See also ==
- Jerusalem Marathon
- Tiberias Marathon
- Sports in Israel
