= Sotteville, Manche =

Sotteville
- Commune
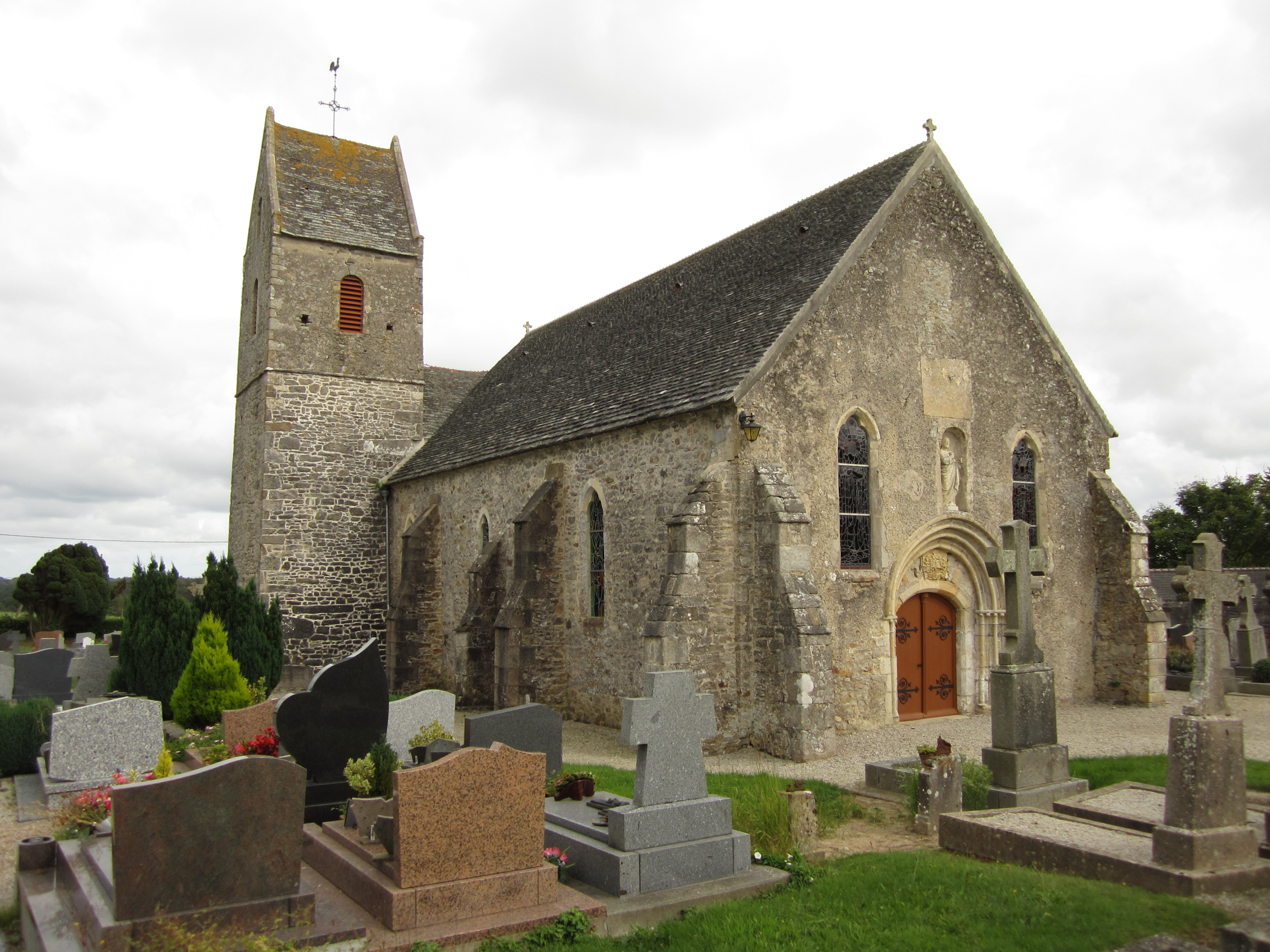
- The church of Saint-Pierre

- Coat of arms
- Location of Sotteville
- Location within France Location within Normandy
- Coordinates: 49°32′22″N 1°45′09″W
- Country: France
- Region: Normandy
- Department: Manche
- Arrondissement: Cherbourg
- Canton: Les Pieux
- Intercommunality: CA Cotentin

Government
  - Mayor (2020–2026): Bruno Sanson
- Area^{1}: 6.13 km^{2} (2.37 sq mi)
- Elevation: 78 m (256 ft)
- Highest elevation: 138 m (453 ft)
- Lowest elevation: 55 m (180 ft)
- Population (2023): 485
  - Density: 79.1/km^{2} (205/sq mi)
- Time zone: UTC+01:00 (CET)
  - Summer (DST): UTC+02:00 (CEST)
- INSEE/Postal code: 50580 /50340
- ^{1} French Land Register data, which excludes lakes, ponds, glaciers > 1 km^{2} (0.386 sq mi or 247 acres) and river estuaries.

Sotteville (French pronunciation: [sɔtvil]) is a commune in the Manche department in Normandy in north-western France.

== See also ==
- Communes of the Manche department
