= Jean-Michel Charbonnel =

French long-distance runner

Personal information
- Nationality: French
- Born: 25 April 1952 (age 74) Paris, France

Sport
- Sport: Long-distance running
- Event: Marathon

Jean-Michel Charbonnel (born 25 April 1952) is a French long-distance runner. He competed in the marathon at the 1980 Summer Olympics.
