= Danny Kassap =

Congolese-Canadian long-distance runner

Danny Tshindind Kassap (24 June 1982 – 2 May 2011) was a Congolese-Canadian long-distance runner who specialized in the marathon.

He competed at the 2001 Jeux de la Francophonie in Canada, and subsequently settled in Toronto. Kassap worked in a fish and chips shop while pursuing a career in running. At the 2004 Toronto Waterfront Marathon, which he won, he achieved his lifetime best time in the marathon, of 2:14:50 hours. Kassap also set a national record for the DR Congo when he ran the 10,000 metres in 28:57.28 minutes, achieved in July 2003 in Hamilton. He finished fifteenth in the 2008 London Marathon. The same year Kassap changed nationality from Congolese to Canadian.

He had health problems which started later in 2008, when he collapsed mid-race in the Berlin Marathon. Kassap was diagnosed with ventricular fibrillation. He slowly recovered, but in May 2011 he was forced to withdraw from another race. Kassap died on the next day at Sunnybrook Hospital.
