= Herve =

City in Liège Province, Wallonia, Belgium

Herve Heve (Walloon)
- Municipality
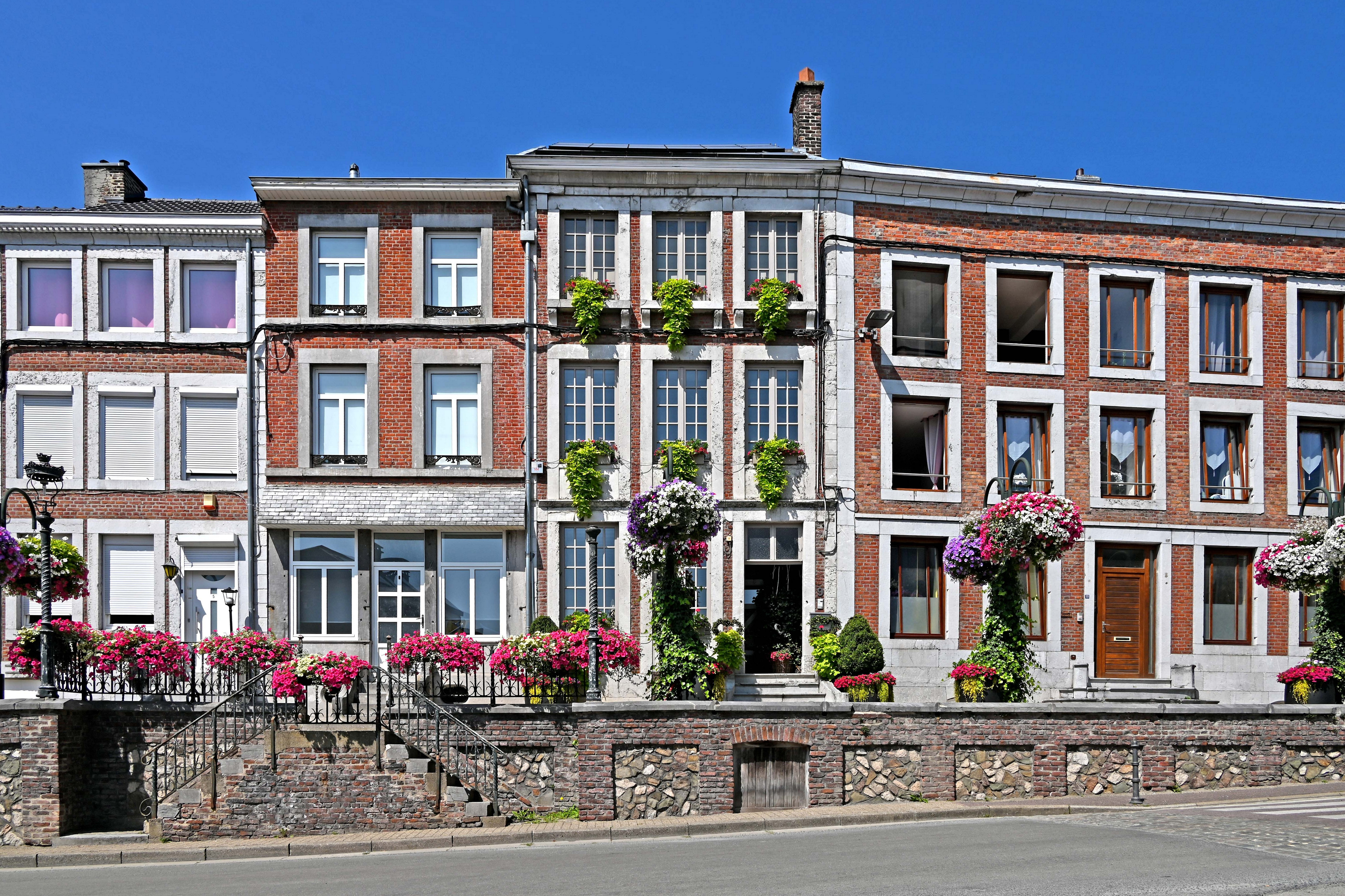
- Herve, Rue du Marché 5-11

- Flag Coat of arms

- Location of Herve in the province of Liège
- Interactive map of Herve
- Location in Belgium
- Coordinates: 50°38′N 05°48′E
- Country: Belgium
- Community: French Community
- Region: Wallonia
- Province: Liège
- Arrondissement: Verviers

Government
  - Mayor: Marc Drouguet (Herve Demain)
  - Governing party: Herve Demain

Area
  - Total: 56.84 km^{2} (21.95 sq mi)

Population (2018-01-01)
  - Total: 17,598
  - Density: 309.6/km^{2} (801.9/sq mi)
- Postal codes: 4650-4654
- NIS code: 63035
- Area codes: 087
- Website: www.herve.be

Herve (French pronunciation: [ɛʁv]; Limburgish: Herf; Walloon: Heve) is a city and municipality of Wallonia located in the province of Liège, Belgium. On January 1, 2018 Herve had a total population of 17,598. The total area is 56.84 km^{2} (21.95 square miles) which gives a population density of 310 inhabitants per square kilometre (800/sq mi).

It is famed for its Herve cheese.

== Municipal merger ==
Since January 1, 1977, the municipality consists of the following districts: Battice, Bolland, Chaineux, Charneux, Grand-Rechain, Herve, Julémont and Xhendelesse.

Herve is currently constituted of 11 villages: Battice, Bolland, Bruyères, Chaineux, Charneux, Grand-Rechain, Herve, José, Julémont, Manaihant, Xhendelesse.

There are a number of smaller villages in the Herve region, such as Hacboister (district of Bolland).

== Architecture ==
- The Church of St John the Baptist: built in the 17th century. The tower, with a height of 49 m (161 feet), dates back to the 13th century. The bell tower is a distinctively crooked spire, in order to offer better resistance to the wind. The church was classed as a historic monument in 1934.
- Château de Bolland: a mediaeval château largely rebuilt in the 17th century
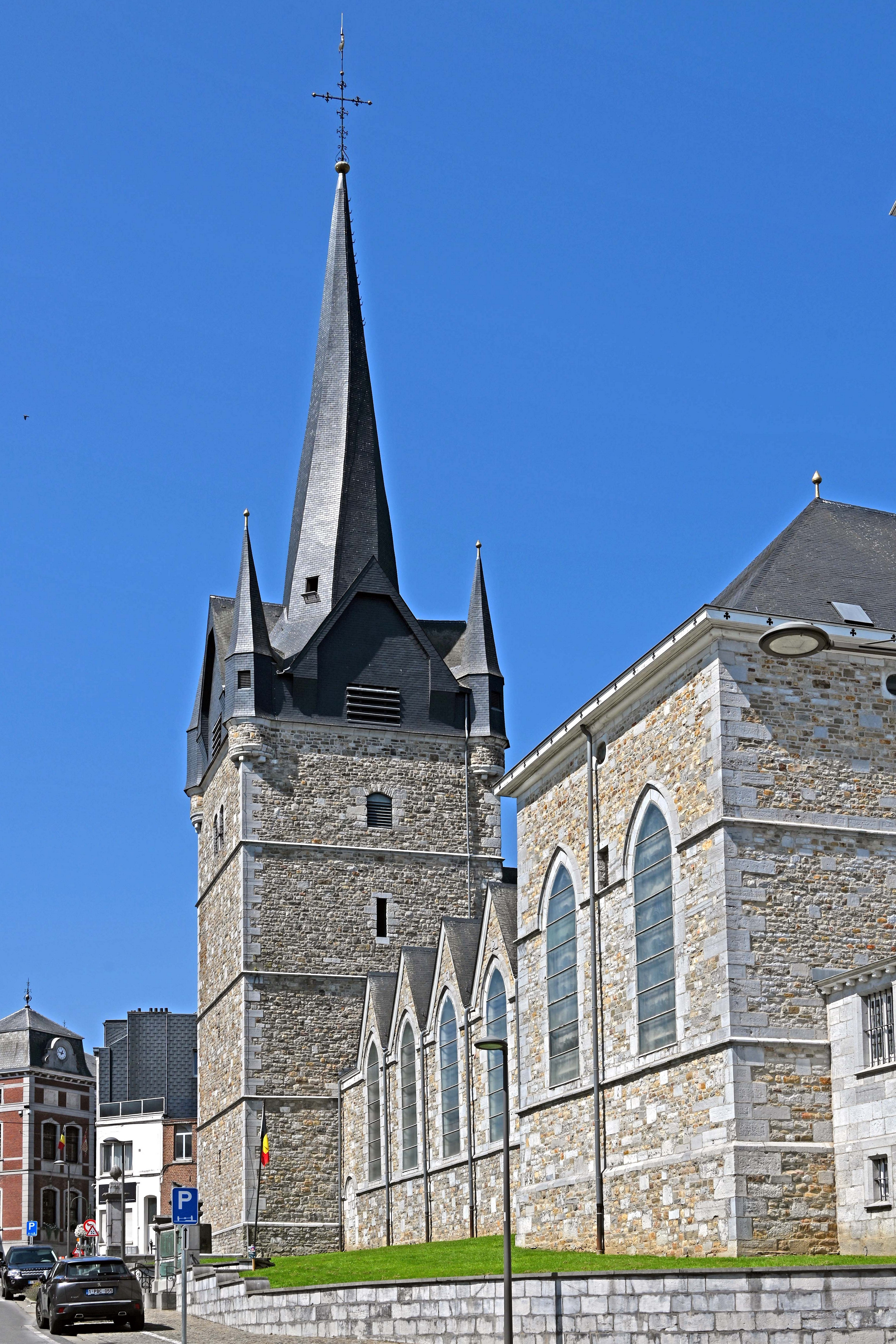
Church of St John the Baptist and its bell tower

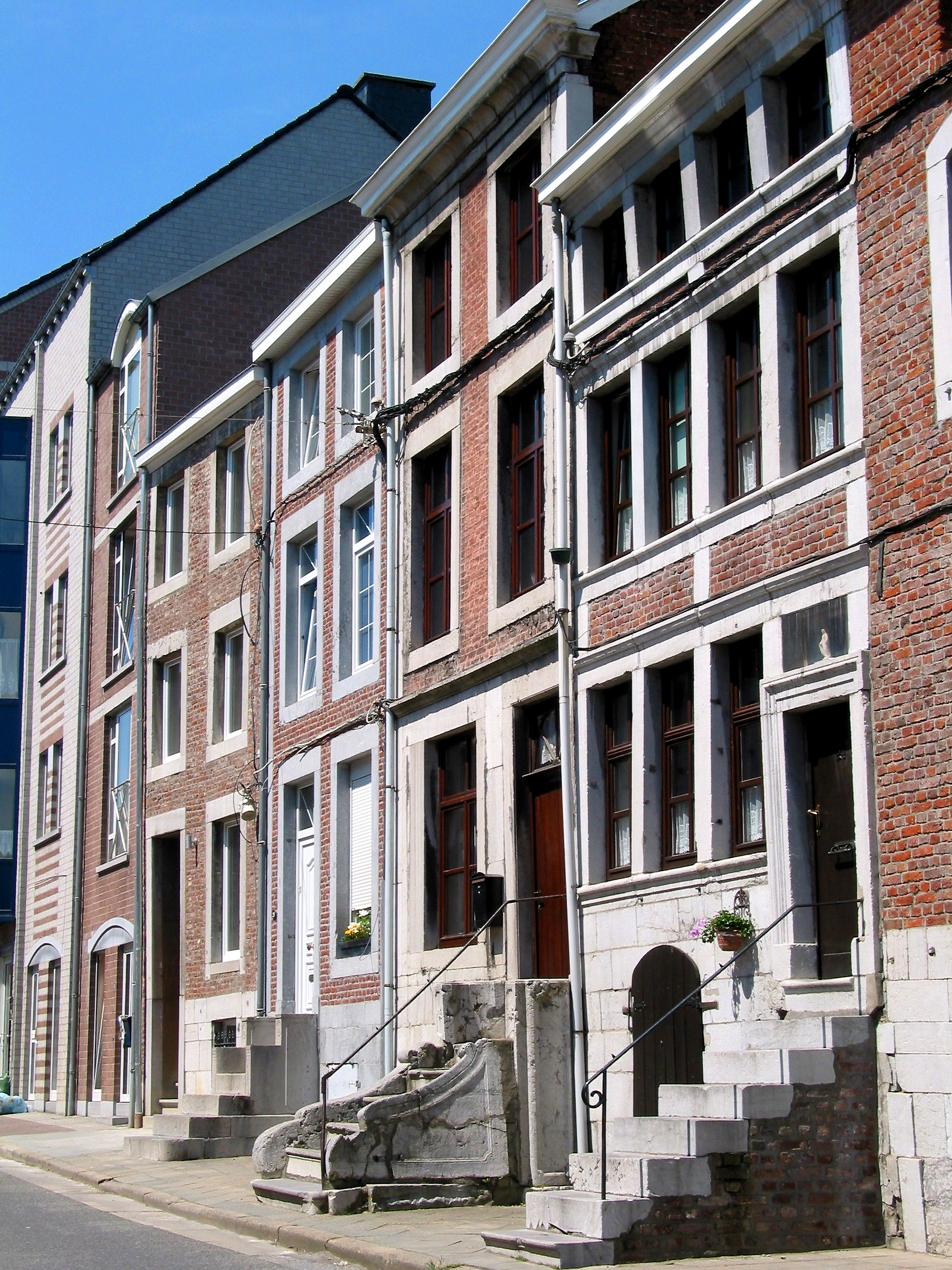
Typical houses in Herve

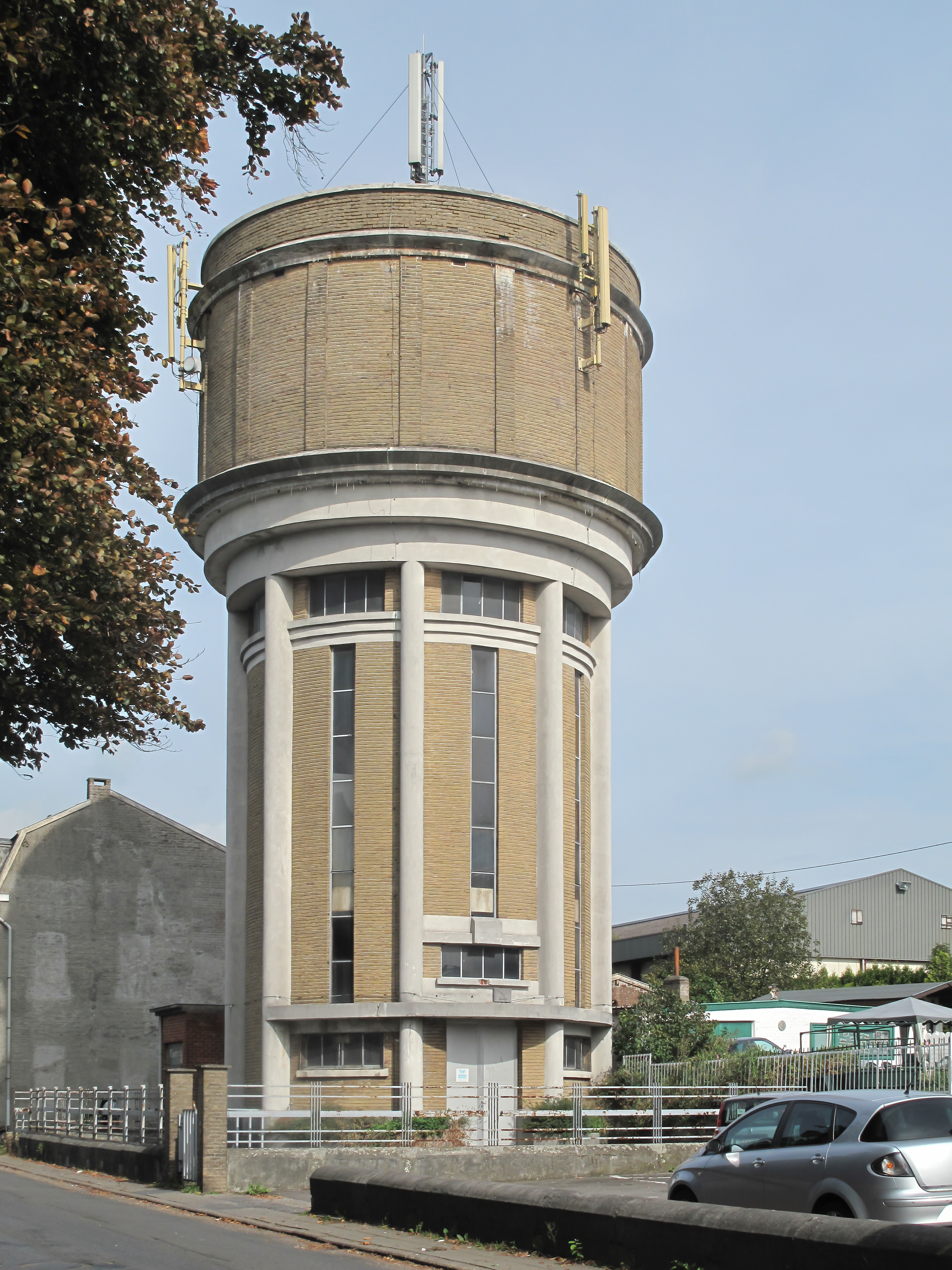
Herve, water tower

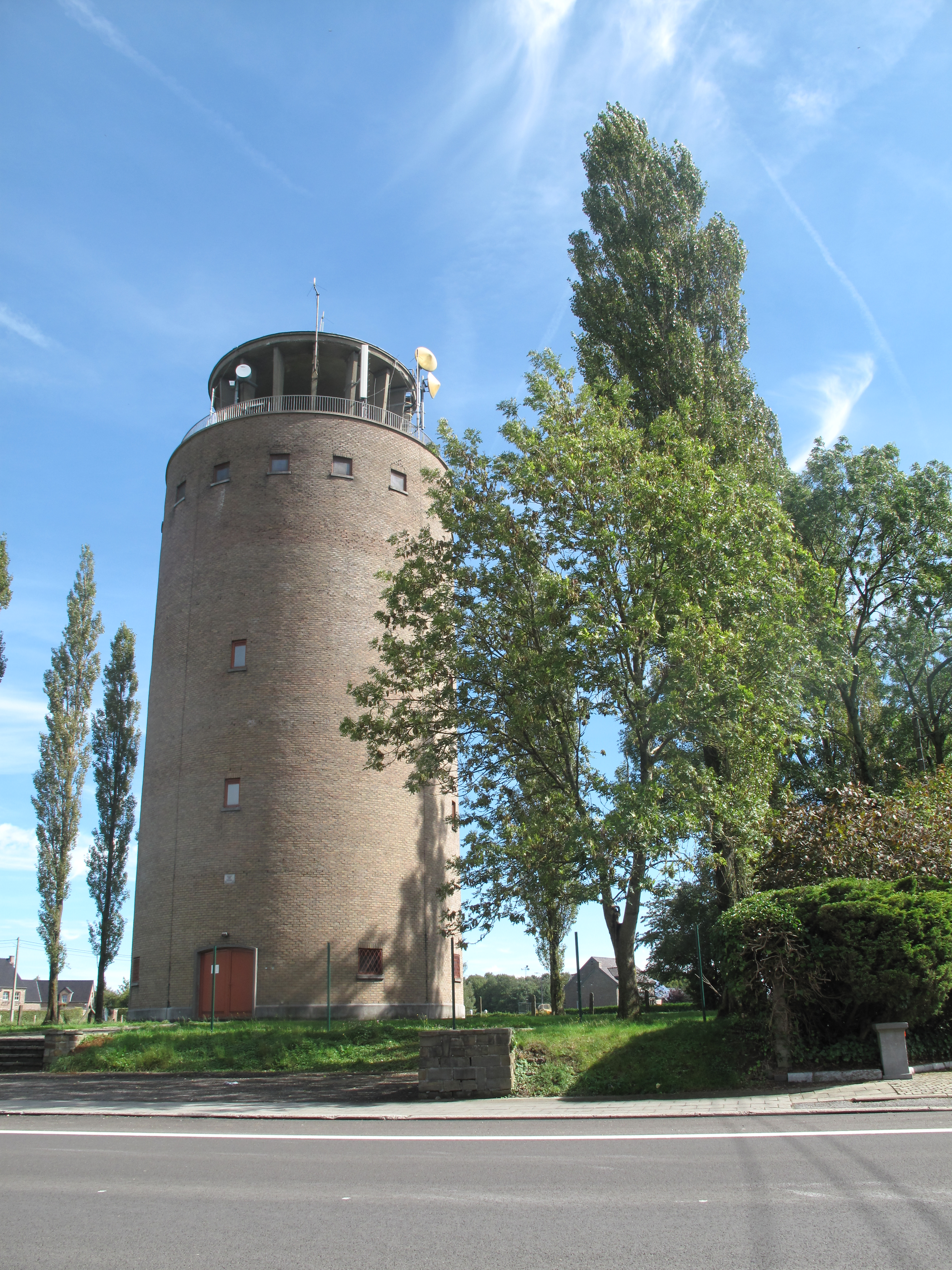
Battice, water tower

== Notable people ==
- André Piters (1931-2014), football player

== See also ==
- List of protected heritage sites in Herve
