= Jerusalem Marathon =

Annual race in Israel held since 2011

- Date: March
- Location: Jerusalem
- Event type: Road
- Distance: Marathon
- Primary sponsor: Toto Winner
- Established: 2011 (15 years ago) (current era)
- Course records: Men's: 2:16:09 (2014) (Kenya) Ronald Kurgat; Women's: 2:38:24 (2016) (Kenya) Joan Kigen
- Website: Jerusalem Marathon
- Participants: 466 finishers (2022); 426 finishers (2021); 1,498 finishers (2019); 1,262 finishers (2018)

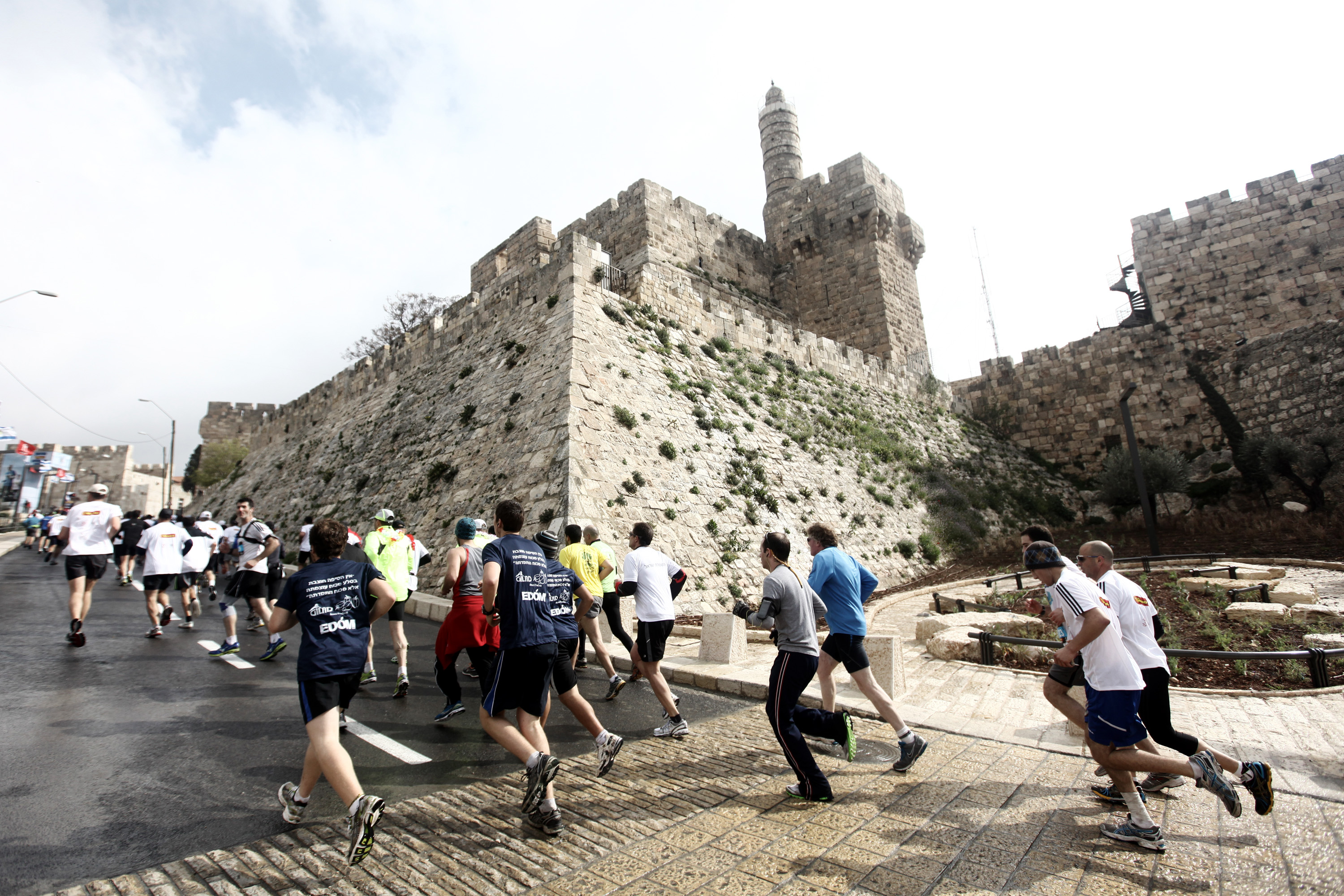
Jerusalem Marathon, 2012

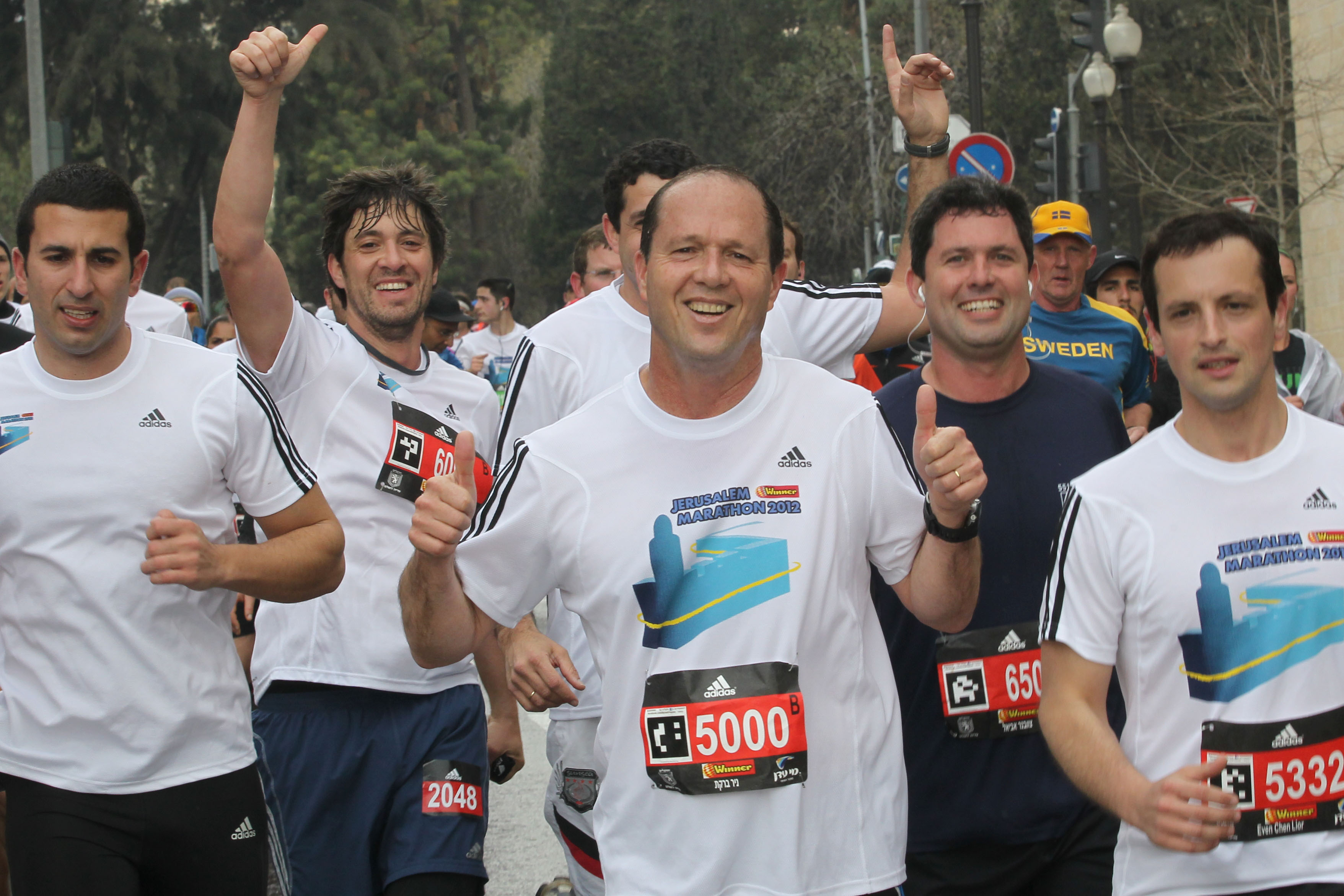
Jerusalem mayor Nir Barkat running in 2012 marathon

The Jerusalem Marathon (Hebrew: מרתון ירושלים) is an annual marathon running event held in Jerusalem during the month of March or April. The course begins at the Knesset and the Israel Museum, passes through Mount Scopus and the Old City, and finishes at Sacher Park. Kenyan runner Ronald Kimeli Kurgat set the men's course record in 2014, while Joan Jepchirchir Kigen, also of Kenya, set the women's record in 2016.

Races at shorter distances (half-marathon, 10km and 5km races, a family race of 1.7km and a community race of 800m) are held in conjunction with the marathon.

== History ==
Prior to the formation of the current event in 2011, a Jerusalem Marathon was staged for three years running between 1992 and 1994. Half-marathon races were held in the city after that and a subsequent push from Jerusalem mayor Nir Barkat resulted in the re-establishment of an international standard marathon in the city.

The marathon was reestablished in March 2011 and drew 10,000 participants from 40 countries. That year, the three leading runners in the men's race veered off course and arrived at the wrong finish line.

The 2012 event, which drew 15,000 runners including 1,500 from 50 countries outside Israel, was marked by rain, strong winds, and pounding hail.

In 2013, twenty thousand runners from 54 countries participated in the third Jerusalem Marathon. The Palestine Liberation Organization called for participants and sponsors to boycott the race in 2013.

In 2014, the number of participants rose to over 25,000.

The 2020 event was postponed, and ultimately cancelled due to the coronavirus pandemic.

The 2024 edition was held in honour of the Israeli security forces. Saucony created the official race shoe, with IDF reservist Orr Sheizaf acting as the shoe brand's ambassador for the event. At the launch of the 2024 event, Jerusalem mayor Moshe Lion, municipal director-general Itzik Larry and Toto CEO Meir Bardugo presented plaques of recognition to representatives of the Be'eri running group and the Triathlon HaOtef club.

In September 2025, Saucony ended its sponsorship of the race after boycotts by groups in the UK running community.

The 2026 event was postponed by 3 weeks due to the 2026 Iran war. Then due to high temperatures, the marathon race was canceled but the shorter distance runs proceeded.

== Course ==
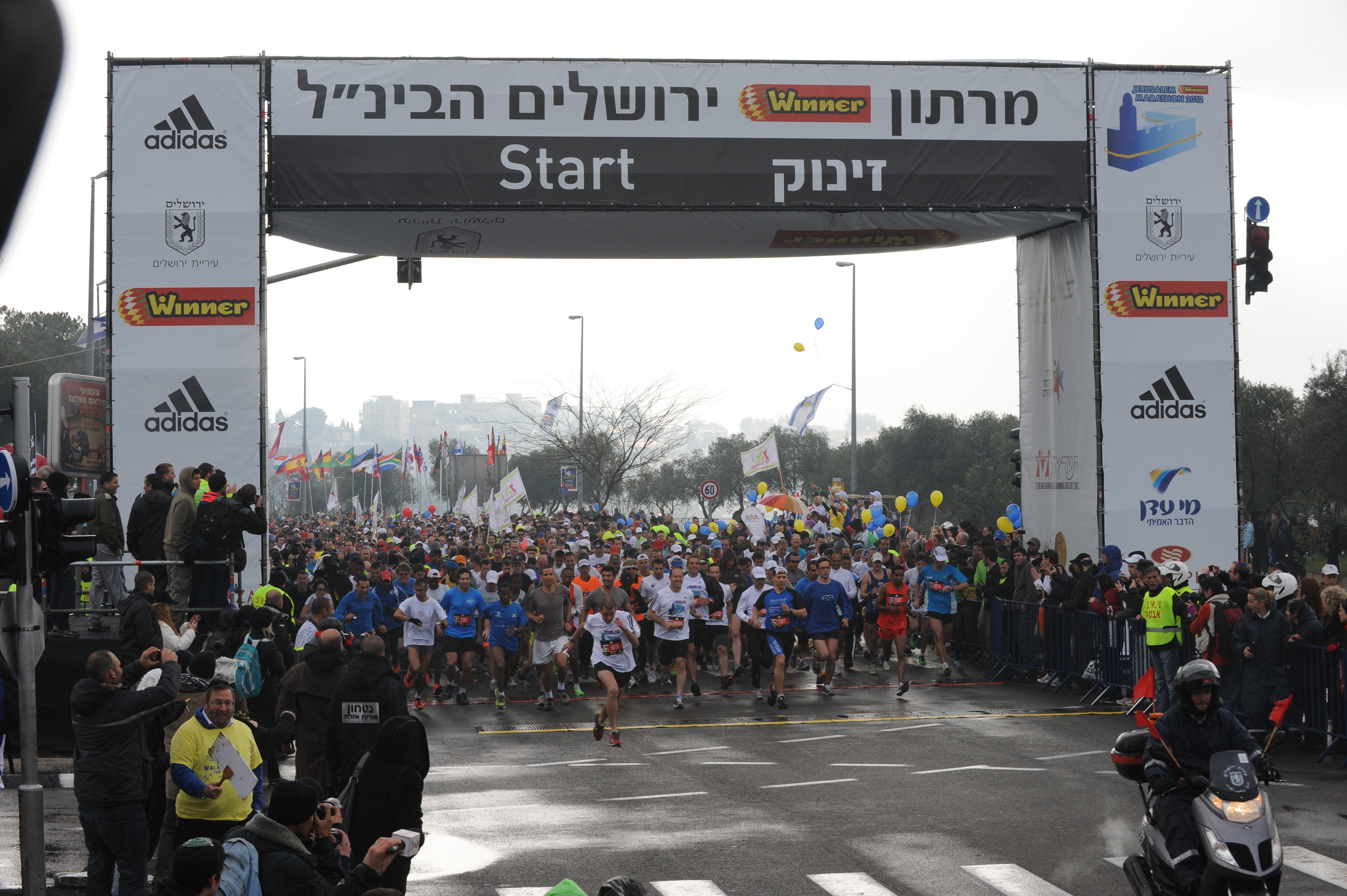
Starting point, 2012

The starting point of the marathon is Israel's parliament, the Knesset, in the western part of the city. Runners thence loop around the Giv'at Ram campus of the Hebrew University of Jerusalem, pass alongside the Valley of the Cross, and cross through various neighborhoods on their way up to Hebrew University's Mount Scopus campus in eastern Jerusalem. The route then descends to the Old City, taking runners through Jaffa Gate and the Armenian Quarter and out Zion Gate, on their way to the Jerusalem Forest. The race's finishing point is Sacher Park. Jerusalem's hilly terrain makes the marathon especially challenging.

== Winners ==
Key: Course record (in bold)

=== Initial era ===
Ed.	Year	Men's Winner	Time	Women's Winner	Time	Rf.
1	1992	Cai Shangyan (CHN)	2:30:34	Wu Mei (CHN)	2:50:23	
2	1993	Hassan Sebtaoui (MAR)	2:25:53	Dominique Rembert (FRA)	3:03:52	
3	1994	Hassan Sebtaoui (MAR)	2:38:05	Tatyana Leonova (MDA)	3:02:16	

=== Current era ===
Ed.	Year	Men's Winner	Time	Women's Winner	Time	Rf.
1	2011	Raymond Kipkoech (KEN)	2:26:44	Oda Worknesh (ETH)	2:50:05	
2	2012	David Toniok (KEN)	2:19:52	Mihret Anamo (ETH)	2:48:38	
3	2013	Abraham Kabeto (ETH)	2:16:30	Mihret Anamo (ETH)	2:47:27	
4	2014	Ronald Kurgat (KEN)	**2:16:09**	Alemtsehay Mesfin (ETH)	2:47:24	
5	2015	Tadesse Yae (ETH)	2:18:20	Joan Kigen (KEN)	2:45:55	
6	2016	Shadrack Kipkosgei (KEN)	2:16:33	Joan Kigen (KEN)	**2:38:24**	
7	2017	Shadrack Kipkogey (KEN)	2:17:35	Emily Samoei (KEN)	2:49:25	
8	2018	Shadrack Kipkogey (KEN)	2:21:26	Emily Samoei (KEN)	2:52:33	
9	2019	Ronald Kurgat (KEN)	2:18:47	Nancy Kimaiyo (KEN)	2:44:50	
—	2020	cancelled due to coronavirus pandemic				
10	2021	Yimer Getahun (ISR)	2:24:07	Anna Prais (ISR)	3:25:50	
11	2022	Noah Kigen (KEN)	2:18:13	Margaret Njuguna (KEN)	2:52:44	
12	2023	Ageze Guadie (ISR)	2:37:17	Valentyna Veretska (UKR)	2:45:54	
13	2024	Jember Melkamu (ISR)	2:35:39	Noah Berkman (ISR)	2:55:42	
14	2025	Bohdan Semenovych (UKR)	2:22:47	Pauline Jepkirui (KEN)	2:51:58	

== Other records ==
- Fastest Israeli man: 2:23:18, Amitai Yonah, 2025
- Fastest Israeli woman: 2:55:42, Noah Berkman, 2024
- Men's half marathon course record: 1:05:55, Onesmus Serem, Kenya, 2011
- Women's half marathon course record: 1:18:00, Margaret Njuguna Wangui, Kenya, 2016
- Fastest Israeli in the half marathon course: 1:07:31, Haimro Alame, 2026
- Fastest Israeli woman in the half marathon course: 1:19:29, Selamawit Teferi, 2022
- Men's 10 km course record: 31:19, Haimro Alame, Israel, 2013
- Women's 10 km course record: 37:31, Lonah Chemtai Salpeter, Israel, 2016

== See also ==
- Tel Aviv Marathon
- Tiberias Marathon
- List of marathon races in Asia
- Sport in Israel
