= Tiberias Marathon =

- Date: early January
- Location: Sea of Galilee, Israel
- Event type: Road running
- Distance: 42.195 km
- Primary sponsor: Toto Winner
- Established: 1977
- Course records: Men: 2:07:30 (2012) (France) Patrick Tambwé; Women: 2:25:45 (2017) (Ethiopia) Hiwot Gebrekidan
- Website: Tiberias Marathon
- Participants: 1,053 finishers (2021); 1,670 (2020); 1,108 (2019)

The Tiberias Marathon is an annual marathon road race held along the Sea of Galilee in Israel. At approximately 200 meters below sea level, this is the lowest course in the world. The competition was first held in 1977, and also hosts the annual Israeli marathon national championship. It was Israel's first international marathon event.

The course follows an out-and-back format around the southern tip of the sea, and the event also includes a half-marathon (21.1 km) and 10 and 5-kilometer runs. In 2010 the 10 km race was moved from the afternoon to before the marathon. The half-marathon race was added in 2018.

In 2007, a Kenyan-born Bahraini athlete, Mushir Salem Jawher (Leonard Mucheru Maina), won the race and was briefly stripped of his Bahrani citizenship by the Bahrani government for competing in Israel. In 2012 Patrick Tambwé, a former Congolese runner representing France, ran a course record of 2:07:30 hours – a time which was the fastest by a European since 2007.

In 2022, David (Necho) Tayachew of Ben Shemen Youth Village and a member of the Maccabi Tel Aviv athletics club, won the men's marathon category with a (then) personal record time of 2:13:00. Beatie Deutsch won the women's category for the fourth time in 2:41:20.

In 2025, Tachlowini Melake Gabriyesos, an Eritrean-born athlete who lives and trains in Tel Aviv, won the men's marathon with a time of 2:19:19. Beatie Deutsch won the women's category for the fifth time in 2:55:41.

In 2026, David (Necho) Tayachew of Ben Shemen Youth Village and a member of the Maccabi Tel Aviv athletics club, won the men's marathon category with a time of 2:17:00. Beatie Deutsch won the women's category for the sixth time in 2:48:40.

== Past winners ==
Key: Course record Race longer than marathon distance

Edition	Year	Men's winner	Time (h:m:s)	Women's winner	Time (h:m:s)
1st	1977	Werner Dörrenbacher (FRG)	2:19:33	Zehava Shmueli (ISR)	3:02:58
2nd	1978	Kevin Shaw (RSA)	2:14:02	Claire Taylor (RSA)	3:08:18
3rd	1979	Werner Dörrenbacher (FRG)	2:18:31	Mazal Shalom (ISR)	3:16:06
4th	1981 (Jan)	James Dingwall (GBR)	2:16:19	Zehava Shmueli (ISR)	2:52:45
5th	1981 (Dec)	Colin Kirkham (GBR)	2:17:11	Gillian Drake (NZL)	2:46:37
6th	1982	Ralf Salzmann (FRG)	2:16:39	Sally Strauss (USA)	2:46:15
7th	1983	Hans Pfisterer (FRG)	2:20:00	Chantal Langlacé (FRA)	2:41:58
8th	1984	Lindsay Robertson (GBR)	2:16:28	Siv Larsson (SWE)	3:05:19
9th	1985	Lindsay Robertson (GBR)	2:15:39	Sharlet Gilbert (USA)	2:42:54
10th	1986	Yair Karni (ISR)	2:23:12	Kerstin Preßler (GER)	2:36:33
11th	1987	Lindsay Robertson (GBR)	2:16:06	Maija Vuorinen (FIN)	2:42:15
12th	1988	Patrick Joannes (FRA)	2:18:08	Maija Vuorinen (FIN)	2:40:01
13th	1989	Reta Negasa (ETH)	2:15:23	Maria Starovská (TCH)	2:40:39
14th	1990	Ahmed Hussein (ETH)	2:18:55	Valentina Enachi (URS)	3:00:32
—	1991	Not held			
15th	1992	Lemi Chengere (ETH)	2:17:07	Marika Starovska (TCH)	2:34:17
16th	1993	Lemi Chengere (ETH)	2:17:30	Frith van der Merwe (RSA)	2:39:11
17th	1994	Ahmed Hussein (ETH)	2:14:52	Liora Leibowitz (ISR)	2:51:36
18th	1995	Ahmed Hussein (ETH)	2:15:10	Tatyana Leonova (MDA)	2:56:38
19th	1996	Wodage Zvadya (ISR)	2:19:30	Nili Abramski (ISR)	2:57:19
20th	1997	Lemi Chengere (ETH)	2:16:41	Alemitu Bekele (ETH)	2:52:48
21st	1998	Moges Taye (ETH)	2:12:51	Abeba Tolla (ETH)	2:41:21
22nd	1999	Dube Jillo (ETH)	2:17:38	Orna Blau (ISR)	2:48:39
23rd	2000	Asaf Bimro (ISR)	2:19:45	Nili Abramski (ISR)	2:42:06
24th	2001	Paul Tangus (KEN)	2:17:06	Nili Abramski (ISR)	2:44:57
25th	2002	Simon Bor (KEN)	2:16:13	Nili Abramski (ISR)	2:36:40
26th	2003	Moges Taye (ETH)	2:12:45	Esther Einer (ISR)	2:51:06
27th	2004	Habtamu Bekele (ETH)	2:15:39	Nili Abramski (ISR)	2:38:42
28th	2005	Habtamu Bekele (ETH)	2:18:08	Nili Abramski (ISR)	2:44:50
29th	2006	John Rotich (KEN)	2:15:43	Nili Abramski (ISR)	2:54:49
30th	2007	Leonard Maina (BHR)	2:13:13	Nili Abramski (ISR)	2:39:25
31st	2008	Leonard Maina (KEN)	2:10:32	Nili Abramski (ISR)	2:39:15
32nd	2009	Jackson Kotut (KEN)	2:08:07	Irene Kosgei (KEN)	2:39:07
33rd	2010	Simon Kariuki (KEN)	2:11:09.5	Emily Samoei (KEN)	2:36:40.3
34th	2011	Stephen Chemlany (KEN)	2:10:02	Abaynesh Sisay (ETH)	2:44:31
35th	2012	Patrick Tambwé (FRA)	2:07:30	Tinibt Gidey (ETH)	2:40:08
36th	2013	Dominic Ondoro (KEN)	2:08:00	Ashete Bekere (ETH)	2:40:22
37th	2014	Tariku Jufar (ETH)	2:10:32	Divina Jepkosgei (KEN)	2:34:41
38th	2015	Hailu Mekonnen (ETH)	2:12:32	Riki Salem (ISR)	2:54:02
39th	2016	Teferi Kebede (ETH)	2:15:31	Edinah Kwambai (KEN)	2:51:16
40th	2017	Habtamu Wegi (ETH)	2:16:39	Hiwot Gebrekidan (ETH)	2:25:45
41st	2018	Girmaw Amare (ISR)	2:15:31	Ayantu Abera (ETH)	2:40:37
42nd	2019	Haimro Alame (ISR)	2:15:16	Beatie Deutsch (ISR)	2:42:18
43rd	2020	Tachlowini Gabriyesos (ERI)	2:14:56	Beatie Deutsch (ISR)	2:32:25
44th	2021	Daniel Molushet (ISR)	2:17:08	Beatie Deutsch (ISR)	2:41:12
45th	2022	David (Necho) Tayachew (ISR)	2:13:00	Beatie Deutsch (ISR)	2:41:20
46th	2025	Tachlowini Gabriyesos (ERI)	2:19:19	Beatie Deutsch (ISR)	2:55:41
47th	2026	David (Necho) Tayachew (ISR)	2:17:00	Beatie Deutsch (ISR)	2:48:40

=== Wins by country ===
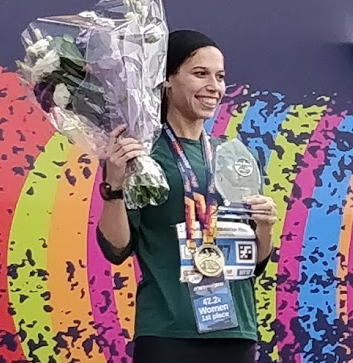
Beatie Deutsch after winning the 2019 Tiberias Marathon

Country	Men's race	Women's race	Total
Israel	8	22	30
Ethiopia	16	7	23
Kenya	8	4	12
Great Britain	5	0	5
Germany	4	1	5
France	2	1	3
South Africa	1	2	3
Finland	0	2	2
Moldova	0	2	2
Czechoslovakia	0	2	2
United States	0	2	2
Bahrain	1	0	1
Eritrea	2	0	2
New Zealand	0	1	1
Sweden	0	1	1

== See also ==
- Jerusalem Marathon
- Tel Aviv Marathon
