= 2026 African Championships in Athletics – Men's 4 × 400 metres relay =

Men's 4 × 400 metres relay at the 2026 African Championships in Athletics
- Venue: Legon Sports Stadium
- Location: Accra, Ghana
- Dates: 17 May
- Winning time: 3:01.12

Medalists
gold medal	Dennis Hove; Leeford Zuze; Gerren Muwishi; Thandazani Ndhlovu	Zimbabwe
silver medal	George Mutinda; Dennis Masika Mulongo; Samuel Chege Waweru; Kelvin Kiprotich Tonui	Kenya
bronze medal	Walid El Boussiri; Rachid Mhamdi; Yassine Hssine; Mohamed Yassine Zerhoumi	Morocco

The men's 4 × 400 metres relay event at the 2026 African Championships in Athletics was held on 17 May in Accra, Ghana.

== Results ==
Rank	Lane	Nation	Competitors	Time	Notes
1st place, gold medalist(s)	7	Zimbabwe	Dennis Hove, Leeford Zuze, Gerren Muwishi, Thandazani Ndhlovu	3:01.12	
2nd place, silver medalist(s)	8	Kenya	George Mutinda, Dennis Masika Mulongo, Samuel Chege Waweru, Kelvin Kiprotich Tonui	3:01.35	
3rd place, bronze medalist(s)	6	Morocco	Walid El Boussiri, Rachid Mhamdi, Yassine Hssine, Mohamed Yassine Zerhoumi	3:01.36	
4	4	Botswana	Kemorena Tisang, Justice Oratile, Victor Ntweng, [[]]	3:02.39	
5	2	Senegal	[[]], Frédéric Mendy, Abou Adama Sane, [[]]	3:02.87	
6	5	Nigeria	Ifeanyi Emmanuel Ojeli, [[]], [[]], Chidi Okezie	3:03.85	
7	3	Ghana	Solomon Diafo, [[]], Blessed Owusu Junior, Godfred Opoku	3:05.14	
