= 2026 African Championships in Athletics – Men's 400 metres =

Men's 400 metres at the 2026 African Championships in Athletics
- Venue: Legon Sports Stadium
- Location: Accra, Ghana
- Dates: 12–14 May
- Competitors: 35 from 15 nations
- Winning time: 44.66

Medalists
gold medal	Lee Eppie	Botswana
silver medal	Denis Hove	Zimbabwe
bronze medal	Leeford Zuze	Zimbabwe

The men's 400 metres event at the 2026 African Championships in Athletics was held on 12, 13 and 14 May in Accra, Ghana.

== Results ==
=== Heats ===
First 3 of each heat (Q) and the next 6 fastest (q) qualified for the semifinals.

Rank	Heat	Athlete	Nationality	Time	Notes
1	5	Lee Eppie	Botswana	44.52	Q
2	6	Leeford Zuze	Zimbabwe	45.01	Q
3	6	Mohamed Yassine Zerhoumi	Morocco	45.03	Q
4	5	Dennis Hove	Zimbabwe	45.13	Q
5	4	Justice Oratile	Botswana	45.34	Q
6	5	Blessed Owusu Junior	Ghana	45.37	Q
7	4	Kelvin Kiprotich Tonui	Kenya	45.38	Q
8	5	Cheikh Tidiane Diouf	Senegal	45.44	q
9	4	Godfred Opoku	Ghana	45.50	Q
10	5	Ifeanyi Emmanuel Ojeli	Nigeria	45.64	q
11	2	Thandazani Ndhlovu	Zimbabwe	45.69	Q
12	1	George Mutinda	Kenya	45.77	Q
13	4	Elvis Gaseb	Namibia	46.02	q
14	6	Abou Adama Sane	Senegal	46.09	Q
15	1	Kennedy Luchembe	Zambia	46.14	Q
16	6	Haron Adoli	Uganda	46.17	q
17	2	Patrick Kakozi Nyambe	Zambia	46.20	Q
18	1	Sikiru Adewale Adeyemi	Nigeria	46.25	Q
19	1	Frédéric Mendy	Senegal	46.25	q
20	5	Walid El Boussiri	Morocco	46.34	q
21	2	Merdekiyos Wolde	Ethiopia	46.57	Q
22	3	Samson Oghenewegba Nathaniel	Nigeria	46.67	Q
23	3	Kenneth Omuka	Uganda	46.70	Q
24	3	Rachid Mhamdi	Morocco	46.72	Q
25	2	Kabo Rankgwe	Botswana	46.99	
26	2	Solomon Diafo	Ghana	46.99	
27	3	Nhial Nyang	Ethiopia	47.09	
28	4	Bakary Kansaye	Ivory Coast	47.34	
29	4	Godfrey Chanwengo	Uganda	47.53	
30	6	Ivan Danny Geldenhuys	Namibia	47.69	
31	1	Vicky Busa Ekoki	Democratic Republic of the Congo	48.86	
32	4	Ibrahim Adamou Mahmat Sani	Chad	49.12	
33	1	Henry Fulumaka	Zambia	49.42	
34	6	Nyembu Kazadi	Democratic Republic of the Congo	50.04	
35	1	Solomon Ayela Okeny	ART	52.40	
	1	Esmael Freitas	São Tomé and Príncipe	DNS	
	2	Prince Nadoussou	Central African Republic	DNS	
	2	Anthony Jules	Republic of the Congo	DNS	
	3	Dennis Masika Mulongo	Kenya	DNS	
	3	Evariste Nana Kuate	Cameroon	DNS	
	5	Ibrahim Adamou Mahmat Sani	Chad	DNS	
	6	Abdoul Kader Ouedraogo	Burkina Faso	DNS	

=== Semifinals ===
First 2 of each heat (Q) and the next 2 fastest (q) qualified for the final.

Rank	Heat	Athlete	Nationality	Time	Notes
1	3	Dennis Hove	Zimbabwe	44.88	Q
2	1	Lee Eppie	Botswana	44.89	Q
3	3	Mohamed Yassine Zerhoumi	Morocco	45.14	Q
4	1	Thandazani Ndhlovu	Zimbabwe	45.41	Q
5	2	Justice Oratile	Botswana	45.48	Q
6	3	Ifeanyi Emmanuel Ojeli	Nigeria	45.50	q
7	2	Leeford Zuze	Zimbabwe	45.56	Q
8	3	Godfred Opoku	Ghana	45.68	
9	2	Kelvin Kiprotich Tonui	Kenya	45.90	q
10	1	Cheikh Tidiane Diouf	Senegal	45.97	
11	1	George Mutinda	Kenya	46.03	
12	3	Abou Adama Sane	Senegal	46.21	
13	3	Kenneth Omuka	Uganda	46.26	
14	3	Haron Adoli	Uganda	46.37	
15	2	Blessed Owusu Junior	Ghana	46.39	
16	3	Patrick Kakozi Nyambe	Zambia	46.40	
17	2	Elvis Gaseb	Namibia	46.78	
18	2	Sikiru Adewale Adeyemi	Nigeria	46.98	
19	1	Kennedy Luchembe	Zambia	47.05	
20	2	Frédéric Mendy	Senegal	47.12	
21	2	Rachid Mhamdi	Morocco	47.13	
	1	Merdekiyos Wolde	Ethiopia	DNF	
	1	Samson Oghenewegba Nathaniel	Nigeria	DNS	
	1	Walid El Boussiri	Morocco	DNS	

=== Final ===
Rank	Heat	Athlete	Nationality	Time	Notes
1st place, gold medalist(s)	5	Lee Eppie	Botswana	44.66	
2nd place, silver medalist(s)	7	Dennis Hove	Zimbabwe	44.92	
3rd place, bronze medalist(s)	3	Leeford Zuze	Zimbabwe	45.03	
4	8	Mohamed Yassine Zerhoumi	Morocco	45.23	
5	6	Justice Oratile	Botswana	45.26	
6	1	Kelvin Kiprotich Tonui	Kenya	45.37	
7	4	Thandazani Ndhlovu	Zimbabwe	45.38	
8	2	Ifeanyi Emmanuel Ojeli	Nigeria	46.27	
