= 2025 World Athletics Relays – Men's 4 × 400 metres relay =

Men's 4 × 400 metres relay at the 2025 World Athletics Relays
- Venue: Tianhe Stadium, Guangzhou
- Dates: 10 May (heats); 11 May (repechage round & final)
- Winning time: 2:57.50

Medalists
gold medal	Gardeo Isaacs; Udeme Okon; Leendert Koekemoer; Zakithi Nene; Lythe Pillay*; Mthi Mthimkulu*	South Africa
silver medal	Jonathan Sacoor; Robin Vanderbemden; Daniel Segers; Alexander Doom; Christian Iguacel*; Dylan Borlée*	Belgium
bronze medal	Lee Eppie; Justice Oratile; Kabo Rankgwe; Leungo Scotch; Victor Ntweng*	Botswana

The men's 4 × 400 metres relay at the 2025 World Athletics Relays was held at the Tianhe Stadium in Guangzhou, China on 10 and 11 May.

The event served as a qualifying event for the 2025 World Athletics Championships, with the top 14 teams securing qualification to the World Championships.

== Records ==
Prior to the competition, the records were as follows:

Record	Team	Time	Location	Date
World record	United States (Andrew Valmon, Quincy Watts, Butch Reynolds, Michael Johnson)	2:54.29	Stuttgart, Germany	22 August 1993
Championships record	United States (David Verburg, Tony McQuay, Christian Taylor, LaShawn Merritt)	2:57.25	(The Bahamas) Nassau, Bahamas	25 May 2014
2025 World Leading	Kenya (Kevin Kiprotich Tonui, Boniface Mweresa, Brian Onyari Tinega, Kevin Kipkorir)	3:00.87	Nairobi, Kenya	26 April 2025

== Qualification ==
On 10 November 2024, World Athletics announced the qualification system for the championships. The top 16 teams in each event at the 2024 Summer Olympic Games qualify for entry to the championships. The host country China will enter with one team in each event, regardless of any entry conditions. The remaining teams (up to 32 in total per event) will be determined through the top lists in the qualification period (1 January 2024 to 13 April 2025).

== Program ==
All times are local (UTC+8).

Date	Time	Round
10 May 2025	20:23	Heats
11 May 2025	20:56	Repechage round
11 May 2025	21:49	Final

== Results ==
=== Heats (World Championships Qualifying Round 1) ===
The heats were held on 10 May 2025, starting at 20:23 (UTC+8) in the evening. Qualification: First 2 of each heat qualify to the 2025 World Athletics Championships (WQ) and World Athletics Relays Final. All teams that do not qualify move on the repechage round, where they get a second chance to qualify for the World Championships.

==== Heat 1 ====
Rank	Lane	Nation	Competitors	Time	Notes
1	8	South Africa	Mthi Mthimkulu, Udeme Okon, Lythe Pillay, Zakithi Nene	3:00.00	WQ, WL
2	9	China	Liang Baotang, Li Yiqing, Zhang Qining, Fu Haoran	3:01.87	WQ, NR
3	7	Spain	Gerson Pozo, Julio Arenas, Manuel Guijarro, Bernat Erta	3:02.04	SB
4	5	Jamaica	Javier Brown, Zandrion Barnes, Rusheen McDonald, Tarees Rhoden	3:03.54	SB
5	6	Germany	Niklas Noah Klei, Friedrich Rumpf, Lukas Krappe, Fabian Dammermann	3:06.26	SB
6	4	Australia	Augustine Nketie Junior, Thomas Reynolds, Luke van Ratingen, Terrell Thorne	3:06.32	

==== Heat 2 ====
Rank	Lane	Nation	Competitors	Time	Notes
1	8	Botswana	Lee Eppie, Justice Oratile, Victor Ntweng, Leungo Scotch	3:01.23	WQ, SB
2	4	Portugal	Ericsson Tavares, Omar Elkhatib, João Coelho, Ricardo dos Santos	3:01.78	WQ, NR
3	6	Brazil	Tiago Lemes da Silva, Lucas Carvalho, Vinícius Moura, Matheus Lima	3:02.19	SB
4	7	Netherlands	Liemarvin Bonevacia, Nick Smidt, Isaya Klein Ikkink, Jonas Phijffers	3:02.94	SB
5	5	Zambia	Patrick Kakozi Nyambe, Kennedy Luchembe, Sitali Kakene, David Mulenga	3:04.83	SB
6	9	Ireland	Christopher O'Donnell, Callum Baird, Marcus Lawler, Jack Raftery	3:05.47	SB

==== Heat 3 ====
Rank	Lane	Nation	Competitors	Time	Notes
1	7	Belgium	Christian Iguacel, Robin Vanderbemden, Dylan Borlée, Alexander Doom	3:01.35	WQ, SB
2	5	Great Britain	Efekemo Okoro, Toby Harries, Rio Mitcham, Charles Dobson	3:01.38	WQ, SB
3	8	Qatar	Abderrahman Samba, Bassem Hemeida, Ashraf Osman, Ammar Ibrahim	3:03.97	SB
4	6	Italy	Edoardo Scotti, Vladimir Aceti, Riccardo Meli, Lorenzo Benati	3:04.01	SB
5	4	Senegal	Frédéric Mendy, Omar Ndoye, Abdou Aziz Ndiaye, Cheikh Tidiane Diouf	3:05.37	SB
6	9	Mexico	Edgar Ramírez Ríos, Guillermo Campos, Pablo Vargas, Valente Mendoza	3:05.74	

==== Heat 4 ====
Rank	Lane	Nation	Competitors	Time	Notes
1	5	France	Muhammad Abdallah Kounta, Loïc Prévot, David Sombé, Adrien Coulibaly	3:00.30	WQ, SB
2	6	Kenya	Zablon Ekwam, Boniface Onyari Mweresa, Brian Onyari Tinega, Kevin Kipkorir	3:00.88	WQ
3	7	United States	Jevon O'Bryant, Lance Lang, Kennedy Lightner, Elija Godwin	3:01.23	SB
4	8	Poland	Michal Kijewski, Marcin Karolewski, Patryk Grzegorzewicz, Mateusz Rzeźniczak	3:02.69	SB
5	9	India	Santhosh Kumar Tamilarasan, Manu Thekkinalil Saji, Vishal Thennarasu Kayalvizhi, Mohit Kumar	3:03.92	SB
6	4	Zimbabwe	Gerren Muwishi, Leeford Zuze, Aldrin Tadiwanashe Tafa, Dennis Bradley Hove	3:05.65	

=== Repechage Round (World Championships Qualifying Round 2) ===
The repechage round was held on 11 May 2025, starting at 20:56 (UTC+8) in the evening. The repechage round consisted of all countries which did not qualify for the final. Qualification: First 3 of each heat qualify to the 2025 World Athletics Championships (WQ).

==== Heat 1 ====
Rank	Lane	Nation	Competitors	Time	Notes
1	8	Brazil	Tiago Lemes da Silva, Lucas Carvalho, Elias Oliveira, Matheus Lima	3:01.14	WQ, SB
2	7	Netherlands	Jonas Pfijffers, Eugene Omalla, Nick Smidt, Isaya Klein Ikkink	3:01.32	WQ, SB
3	5	Jamaica	Rusheen McDonald, Demar Francis, Zandrion Barnes, Tarees Rhoden	3:02.00	WQ, SB
4	9	Poland	Maksymilian Szwed, Marcin Karolewski, Kajetan Duszyński, Mateusz Rzeźniczak	3:02.15	SB
5	2	Senegal	Abdou Aziz Ndiaye, El Hadji Malick Soumaré, Frédéric Mendy, Cheikh Tidiane Diouf	3:02.51	SB
6	6	Italy	Lapo Bianciardi, Lorenzo Benati, Francesco Rossi, Matteo Raimondi	3:04.14	
7	4	India	Jay Kumar, Dharmveer Choudmary, Manu Thekkinalil Saji, Rince Joseph	3:04.49	
	3	Zimbabwe	Gerren Muwishi, Leeford Zuze, Aldrin Tadiwanashe Tafa, Dennis Bradley Hove	DQ	TR24.21

==== Heat 2 ====
Rank	Lane	Nation	Competitors	Time	Notes
1	6	United States	Elija Godwin, Justin Robinson, Kennedy Lightner, Khaleb McCrae	2:58.68	WQ, WL
2	9	Australia	Cooper Sherman, Reece Holder, Aidan Murphy, Thomas Reynolds	2:59.73	WQ, SB
3	7	Qatar	Ammar Ibrahim, Bassem Hemeida, Ashraf Osman, Abderrahman Samba	3:00.29	WQ, NR
4	4	Spain	Gerson Pozo, Manuel Guijarro, Markel Fernández, Julio Arenas	3:02.12	
5	8	Zambia	Sitali Kakene, Kennedy Luchembe, David Mulenga, Patrick Kakozi Nyambe	3:03.16	SB
6	3	Mexico	Edgar Ramírez Ríos, Guillermo Campos, Julio Pacheco, Valente Mendoza	3:03.47	SB
7	2	Ireland	Conor Kelly, Cillin Greene, Christopher O'Donnell, Jack Raftery	3:04.42	SB
8	5	Germany	Niklas Noah Klei, Friedrich Rumpf, Lukas Krappe, Fabian Dammermann	3:05.45	SB

=== Final ===
The final was held on 11 May 2025, starting at 21:49 (UTC+8) in the evening.

Rank	Lane	Nation	Competitors	Time	Notes
1st place, gold medalist(s)	7	South Africa	Gardeo Isaacs, Udeme Okon, Leendert Koekemoer, Zakithi Nene	2:57.50	WL, NR
2nd place, silver medalist(s)	8	Belgium	Jonathan Sacoor, Robin Vanderbemden, Daniel Segers, Alexander Doom	2:58.19	SB
3rd place, bronze medalist(s)	5	Botswana	Lee Eppie, Justice Oratile, Kabo Rankgwe, Leungo Scotch	2:58.27	SB
4	6	France	Adrien Coulibaly, Loïc Prévot, David Sombé, Jimy Soudril	2:58.80	SB
5	4	Kenya	Kelvin Tonui, Zablon Ekwam, Boniface Onyari Mweresa, Kevin Kipkorir	2:59.29	NR
6	9	Great Britain	Toby Harries, Efekemo Okoro, Joshua Faulds, Rio Mitcham	3:03.46	
7	3	Portugal	Ericsson Tavares, Ricardo dos Santos, Omar Elkhatib, André Franco	3:04.52	
8	2	China	Bao Chengzhe, Yu Dexiang, Zheng Chiyu, Li Yiqing	3:06.33	
