= 2026 World Athletics Ultimate Championship – Mixed 4 × 400 metres relay =

Mixed 4 × 400 metres relay at the 2026 World Athletics Ultimate Championship
- Venue: National Athletics Centre
- Location: Budapest, Hungary
- Dates: 13 September 2026 (final)
- Competitors: 36 from 9 nations
- Winning time: 3:08.32 min

Champion
- United States (Chris Bailey, Alexis Holmes, Jacory Patterson, Aaliyah Butler)

The mixed 4 × 400 metres relay was held as a straight final at the 2026 World Athletics Ultimate Championship at the National Athletics Centre in Budapest, Hungary on 13 September 2026. It was the first time the World Ultimate Championship is held. Teams qualified by competition placement or by their world ranking.

== Background ==
Global records before the 2026 World Athletics Ultimate Championship
Record	Time	Athlete (nation)	Location	Date
World record	3:07.41	United States (Vernon Norwood, Shamier Little, Bryce Deadmon, Kaylyn Brown)	Saint-Denis, France	2 August 2024
World lead	3:07.47	United States (Bryce Deadmon, Paris Peoples, Jenoah McKiver, Bailey Lear)	Gaborone, Botswana	3 May 2026

Area records before the 2026 World Athletics Ultimate Championship
Record	Time	Athlete (nation)	Location	Date
African record	3:09.87	Kenya (George Mutinda, Mercy Oketch, Kelvin Tonui, Mercy Chebet)	Doha, Qatar	2 May 2026
Asian record	3:11.82	Bahrain (Musa Isah, Aminat Yusuf Jamal, Salwa Eid Naser, Abbas Abubakar Abbas)	Gaborone, Botswana	29 September 2019
European record	3:07.43	Netherlands (Eugene Omalla, Lieke Klaver, Isaya Klein Ikkink, Femke Bol)	Saint-Denis, France	3 August 2024
North, Central American, and Caribbean record	3:07.41	United States (Vernon Norwood, Shamier Little, Bryce Deadmon, Kaylyn Brown)	Saint-Denis, France	2 August 2024
Oceanian record	3:10.57	Australia (Cooper Sherman, Ellie Beer, Thomas Reynolds, Mia Gross)	Gaborone, Botswana	2 May 2026
South American record	3:14.42	Colombia (Nicolás Salinas, Lina Esther Licona Torres, Daniel Balanta, Evelis Aguilar)	Bogotá, Colombia	5 April 2025

== Qualification ==
For the mixed 4 × 400 metres relay, nine teams qualified, five by their finishing position at the 2026 World Relays, three by their position at the World Athletics Rankings for the event on 3 September 2026 and finally Hungary were awarded an entry due to being the host country.

== Results ==
=== Final ===
The final was held on 13 September at 19:53 (UTC+2).

Place	Lane	Nation	Athletes	Time	Notes
1st place, gold medalist(s)	6	United States	Chris Bailey, Alexis Holmes, Jacory Patterson, Aaliyah Butler	3:08.32	
2	8	Great Britain	Ben Jefferies, Yemi Mary John, Toby Harries, Charlotte Henrich	3:09.40	SB
3	9	Netherlands	Jonas Phijffers, Lieke Klaver, Keenan Blake, Myrte van der Schoot	3:09.57	SB
4	2	Belgium	Jonathan Sacoor, Helena Ponette, Daniel Segers, Camille Laus	3:10.85	SB
5	7	Norway	Karsten Warholm, Amalie Iuel, Håvard Bentdal Ingvaldsen, Henriette Jæger	3:11.31	
6	5	Jamaica	Zandrion Barnes, Shana Kaye Anderson, Assinie Wilson, Stacey-Ann Williams	3:11.46	
7	3	Italy	Edoardo Scotti, Anna Polinari, Lorenzo Benati, Alessandra Bonora	3:11.56	
8	1	Hungary	Patrik Simon Enyingi, Lili Hanna Brucker, Attila Molnár, Sophia Akuchi Emmanuel	3:16.73	SB
9	4	Kenya	Boniface Mweresa, Mercy Chebet, Kelvin Tonui, Lanoline Aoko	3:18.42	
