= 2024 African Championships in Athletics – Men's 400 metres =

Men's 400 metres at the 2024 African Championships in Athletics
- Venue: Japoma Stadium
- Location: Douala, Cameroon
- Dates: 21 June (heats); 22 June (semi-finals); 23 June (final)
- Competitors: 52 from 28 nations
- Winning time: 45.23

Medalists
gold medal	Cheikh Tidiane Diouf	Senegal
silver medal	Lee Eppie	Botswana
bronze medal	Samuel Ogazi	Nigeria

The men's 400 metres event at the 2024 African Championships in Athletics was held on 21, 22, and 23 June in Douala, Cameroon.

== Records ==
Records before the 2024 African Athletics Championships
Record	Athlete (nation)	Time (s)	Location	Date
World record	Wayde Van Niekerk (RSA)	43.03	Rio de Janeiro, Brazil	14 August 2016
African record	Wayde Van Niekerk (RSA)	43.03	Rio de Janeiro, Brazil	14 August 2016
Championship record	Isaac Makwala (BOT)	44.23	Marrakesh, Morocco	12 August 2014
World leading	Christopher Morales Williams (CAN)	44.05	Gainesville, United States	11 May 2024
African leading	Bayapo Ndori (BOT)	44.10	Nairobi, Kenya	20 April 2024

== Results ==
=== Heats ===
Qualification: First 2 of each heat (Q) and the next 6 fastest (q) qualified for the semifinals.

Rank	Heat	Name	Nationality	Time	Notes
1	5	Antony Pesela	Botswana	45.85	Q
2	4	Cheikh Tidiane Diouf	Senegal	46.09	Q
3	4	Boitumelo Masilo	Botswana	46.11	Q
4	1	Kevin Kipkorir	Kenya	46.13	Q
4	3	Dubem Amene	Nigeria	46.13	Q
6	2	Chidi Okezie	Nigeria	46.15	Q
7	3	Adrian Swart	South Africa	46.17	Q
8	5	Dennis Hove	Zimbabwe	46.18	Q
9	2	Boniface Mweresa	Kenya	46.32	Q
10	4	Takudzwa Chiyangwa	Zimbabwe	46.47	q
11	5	Mthi Mthimkulu	South Africa	46.50	q
12	2	Lee Eppie	Botswana	46.52	q
13	1	Samuel Ogazi	Nigeria	46.56	Q
14	3	Aaron Adoli	Uganda	46.70	q
15	2	Abdennour Bendjemaa	Algeria	46.74	q
16	1	Mohamed Zerhoum	Morocco	46.76	q
17	2	Gerren Muwishi	Zimbabwe	46.82	
18	1	Gardeo Isaacs	South Africa	46.85	
19	5	El Hadji Malick Soumare	Senegal	46.98	
20	5	Kelvin Sane Tauta	Kenya	47.49	
21	4	Elvis Gaseb	Namibia	47.58	
22	1	Ivan Geldenhuys	Namibia	48.22	
23	2	Evariste Nana Kuate	Cameroon	48.29	
24	2	Elton Hoeseb	Namibia	48.57	
25	5	Jules Waiga	Benin	48.73	
26	3	Melkamu Assefa	Ethiopia	49.45	
27	4	Godwin Edmond Hounthon	Benin	49.59	
28	3	Nsangous Tetdap	Cameroon	50.51	
	2	Fabrice Tenkeu Kengne	Cameroon	DNF	
	5	Caleb Vadivello	Seychelles	DNF	
	3	Abdou Idhat	Senegal	DNS	
	3	Patrice Remandro	Madagascar	DNS	
	4	El-Mir Reale	Reunion	DNS	

=== Semifinals ===
Qualification: First 3 of each semifinal (Q) and the next 2 fastest (q) qualified for the final.

Rank	Heat	Name	Nationality	Time	Notes
1	1	Antony Pesela	Botswana	45.40	Q
2	2	Samuel Ogazi	Nigeria	45.44	Q
3	2	Takudzwa Chiyangwa	Zimbabwe	45.51	Q
4	2	Aaron Adoli	Uganda	45.66	Q
5	1	Boniface Mweresa	Kenya	45.70	Q
6	2	Cheikh Tidiane Diouf	Senegal	45.74	q
7	1	Dubem Amene	Nigeria	45.83	Q
8	1	Lee Eppie	Botswana	45.96	q
9	1	Chidi Okezie	Nigeria	45.96	
10	2	Kevin Kipkorir	Kenya	46.01	
11	2	Boitumelo Masilo	Botswana	46.16	
12	1	Mohamed Zerhoum	Morocco	46.51	
13	2	Abdennour Bendjemaa	Algeria	46.61	
14	1	Mthi Mthimkulu	South Africa	46.73	
15	2	Adrian Swart	South Africa	46.97	
16	1	Dennis Hove	Zimbabwe	46.98	

=== Final ===
Rank	Lane	Athlete	Nationality	Time	Notes
1st place, gold medalist(s)	1	Cheikh Tidiane Diouf	Senegal	45.23	
2nd place, silver medalist(s)	2	Lee Eppie	Botswana	45.39	
3rd place, bronze medalist(s)	4	Samuel Ogazi	Nigeria	45.47	
4	5	Boniface Mweresa	Kenya	45.62	
5	8	Aaron Adoli	Uganda	45.93	
6	6	Antony Pesela	Botswana	46.17	
7	7	Dubem Amene	Nigeria	46.27	
8	3	Takudzwa Chiyangwa	Zimbabwe	46.51	

== See also ==
- Athletics at the 2023 African Games – Men's 400 metres
