= Athletics at the 2026 Commonwealth Games – Mixed 4 × 400 metres relay =

Mixed 4 × 400 metres relay at the 2026 Commonwealth Games
- Venue: Scotstoun Stadium
- Dates: 31 July (Round 1); 1 August (Final)
- Winning time: 3:10.97

Medalists
gold medal	Zandrion Barnes; Leah Anderson; Delano Kennedy; Dejanea Oakley; Shana Kaye Anderson; Christopher Taylor	Jamaica
silver medal	Ben Jefferies; Yemi Mary John; Toby Harries; Lina Nielsen; Poppy Malik; Laviai Nielsen	England
bronze medal	Ezekiel Nathaniel; Patience Okon George; Samuel Ogazi; Ella Onojuvwevwo; Udo Edidiong; Esther Joseph	Nigeria

The mixed 4 × 400 metres relay is part of the athletics programme, which took place in the Alexander Stadium on 31 July and 1 August 2026. The event is a new discipline for the Games.

== Records ==
Prior to this competition, the existing world and Games records were as follows:

Mixed 4 x 400 metres world record.
World record	United States; Vernon Norwood; Shamier Little; Bryce Deadmon; Kaylyn Brown	3:07.41	Paris, France	2 August 2024
Commonwealth record	Great Britain*; Samuel Reardon; Laviai Nielsen; Alex Haydock-Wilson; Amber Anning	3:08.01	Paris, France	3 August 2024

- all members of the team were English, so the time is both a Great Britain and England record.

== Schedule ==
The schedule was as follows:

Date	Time	Round
31 July 2026	10:00	Round 1
1 August 2026	18:30	Final

All times are British Summer Time (UTC+1)

== Results ==
=== Round 1 ===
Round 1 was held on the morning of 31 July 2026.

Rank	Heat	Lane	Nation	Athletes	Time	Notes
1	1	2	Nigeria	Udo Edidiong, Esther Joseph, Samuel Ogazi, Patience Okon George	3:14.58	Q
2	2	2	England	Toby Harries, Poppy Malik, Ben Jefferies, Laviai Nielsen,	3:15.11	Q
3	1	3	Australia	Luke van Ratingen, Mia Gross, Cooper Sherman, Jemma Pollard	3:15.21	Q
4	2	8	Kenya	Kelvin Tonui, Mercy Chebet, Boniface Mweresa, Mercy Oketch	3:15.92	Q
5	1	8	Jamaica	Delano Kennedy, Shana Kaye Anderson, Christopher Taylor, Leah Anderson	3:17.36	Q
6	2	6	Scotland	Brodie Young, Rebecca Grieve, Bradley Francis, Georgina Adam	3:19.07	Q, SB
7	2	4	India	Vishal Thennarasu Kayalvizhi, Ansa Babu, Rajesh Ramesh, Rashdeep Kaur	3:20.98	q
8	1	4	Zambia	Patrick Nyambe, Niddy Mingilishi, Kennedy Luchembe, Emeldah Kapunjila	3:21.72	q
9	1	6	Sri Lanka	Ayomal Akalanka Kuda Liyanage, Lakshima Mendis, Aruna Darshana, Jithma Wijethunga	3:22.42	
10	2	3	Uganda	Haron Adoli, Mauren Banura, Erick Okwii, Leni Shida	3:23.47	
11	2	7	Papua New Guinea	Daniel Baul, Isila Apkup, Adolf Kauba, Scholastica Herman	3:38.25	
12	2	5	Maldives	Riffath Adam, Fasuhaa Ahmed, Zeek Suad Hussain, Ahnaa Nizaar	3:41.03	SB
—	1	7	Sierra Leone	Mohamed Bah, Marie Bangura, Moses Koroma, Jane Kargbo	DQ	TR17.2.3
—	1	5	Lesotho		DNS	

=== Final ===
The final took place on the evening of 1 August 2026.

Place	Nation	Athletes	Time	Notes
1st place, gold medalist(s)	Jamaica	Zandrion Barnes, Leah Anderson, Delano Kennedy, Dejanea Oakley	3:10.97	
2nd place, silver medalist(s)	England	Ben Jefferies, Yemi Mary John, Toby Harries, Lina Nielsen	3:11.58	
3rd place, bronze medalist(s)	Nigeria	Ezekiel Nathaniel, Patience Okon George, Samuel Ogazi, Ella Onojuvwevwo	3:12.85	SB
4	Kenya	Kelvin Kiprotich Tonui, Mercy Chebet, Boniface Ontuga Mweresa, Mercy Adongo Oketch	3:13.95	
5	Scotland	Brodie Young, Rebecca Grieve, Bradley Francis, Nicole Yeargin	3:18.21	SB
6	India	Vishal Thennarasu Kayalvizhi, Ansa Babu, Santhosh Kumar Tamilarasan, Rashdeep Kaur	3:20.32	
—	Zambia	Kennedy Luchembe, Niddy Minglishi, Patrick Nyambe, Emeldah Kapunjila	DNF	
—	Australia	Cooper Sherman, Mia Gross, Thomas Reynolds, Jemma Pollard	DQ	
