= List of Zimbabwean records in athletics =

The following are the national records in athletics in Zimbabwe maintained by the National Athletic Association of Zimbabwe (NAAZ).

== Outdoor ==
Key to tables: Awaiting ratification Record not kept by NAAZ Not ratified or later rescined by NAAZ

=== Men ===
Event	Record	Athlete	Date	Meet	Place	Ref.
100 y	9.59+ (−0.5 m/s)	Gabriel Mvumvure	27 June 2013	Golden Spike Ostrava	Ostrava, Czech Republic	
100 m	9.89 (+1.3 m/s)	Ngonidzashe Makusha	10 June 2011	NCAA Division I Championships	Des Moines, United States	
200 m	19.84 (+0.3 m/s)	Tapiwanashe Makarawu	13 June 2025	NCAA Division I Championships	Eugene, United States	
300 m	32.06	Thandazani Ndhlovu	28 April 2026	Simbine Classic	Pretoria, South Africa	
400 m	44.58	Lewis Banda	15 May 2004		Tucson, United States	
800 m	1:45.03	Savieri Ngidhi	15 June 1996		Caorle, Italy	
1000 m	2:17.68	Passmore Furusa	28 July 1995		Lindau, Germany	
1500 m	3:35.76	Phillimon Hanneck	11 August 1991		Grosseto, Italy	
Mile	3:53.13	Phillimon Hanneck	30 May 1992		San Donato Milanese, Italy	
3000 m	7:42.06	Phillimon Hanneck	18 July 1992		Hechtel-Eksel, Belgium	
5000 m	13:14.50	Phillimon Hanneck	8 June 1994		Rome, Italy	
5 km (road)	13:22	Phillimon Hanneck	28 March 1993	Carlsbad 5000	Carlsbad, United States	
5 km (road)	13:22	Phillimon Hanneck	31 March 1996	Carlsbad 5000	Carlsbad, United States	
10,000 m	27:57.34	Cuthbert Nyasango	28 July 2007		Avilés, Spain	
10 km (road)	27:37	Tendai Chimusasa	25 April 1993		Würzburg, Germany	
15 km (road)	42:35	Phillimon Hanneck	26 February 1994		Tampa, United States	
10 miles (road)	46:23	Brian Sheriff	26 August 1989	Crim Festival of Races	Flint, United States	
20 km (road)	58:43	Cuthbert Nyasango	8 October 2006	World Road Running Championships	Debrecen, Hungary	
Half marathon	1:00:26	Cuthbert Nyasango	14 October 2007	World Road Running Championships	Udine, Italy	
Half marathon	1:00:26	Tendai Chimusasa	24 September 1995	Route du Vin Half Marathon	Remich, Luxembourg	
25 km (road)	1:14:25	Tendai Chimusasa	2 May 1993	Big 25 Berlin	Berlin, Germany	
30 km (road)	1:29:39+	Godwin Katakura	18 October 2026	TCS Amsterdam Marathon	Amsterdam, Netherlands	
Marathon	2:06:48	Isaac Mpofu	4 December 2022	Marathon Valencia Trinidad Alfonso EDP	Valencia, Spain	
Marathon	2:06:23	Godwin Katakura	18 October 2026	TCS Amsterdam Marathon	Amsterdam, Netherlands	
50 km (road)	2:40:04	Tonny Skink	26 February 2023	Nedbank Runified Breaking Barriers 50km	Gqeberha, South Africa	
110 m hurdles	13.99	Iain Harnden	23 March 2001		Tallahassee, United States	
400 m hurdles	48.05	Ken Harnden	29 July 1998	Meeting Areva	Paris, France	
3000 m steeplechase	8:45.33	Passmore Furusa	9 April 1994		Austin, United States	
High jump	2.16 m	Juma Phiri	11 July 1999		Harare, Zimbabwe	
Pole vault	4.60 m (Note: record set during decathlon competition)	Keegan Cooke	18/19 February 2017		Paarl, South Africa	
Long jump	8.40 m (±0.0 m/s)	Ngonidzashe Makusha	9 June 2011	NCAA Division I Championships	Des Moines, United States	
Triple jump	17.34 m (+1.6 m/s)	Ndabazinhle Mdhlongwa	28 March 1998		Lafayette, United States	
Shot put	15.90 m	Addison Dale	19 January 1969		Salisbury, Rhodesia	
Discus throw	51.60 m	Christopher Pullen	8 October 1982	Commonwealth Games	Brisbane, Australia	
Hammer throw	57.40 m	Vincent Michael Lambourn	29 June 1996		Harare, Zimbabwe	
Javelin throw	66.18 m	Roland Vermeulen	20 July 1997		Harare, Zimbabwe	
Decathlon	7491 pts	Keegan Cooke	12–13 June 2015	Santa Barbara Track Club 7Ten Combined Events Championship	Santa Barbara, United States	
Decathlon	100m (wind) / Long jump (wind) / Shot put / High jump / 400m / 110m H (wind) / Discus / Pole vault / Javelin / 1500m; 11.40 (+0.3 m/s) / 6.97 m (−0.1 m/s) / 13.13 m / 1.93 m / 48.89 / 14.94 (±0.0 m/s) / 37.65 m / 4.20 m / 60.29 m / 4:30.64					
20 km walk (road)	2:07:55	A. Johnston	31 July 1979		Hannover, West Germany	
50 km walk (road)						
4 × 100 m relay	38.95 A	Zimbabwe; Dickson Kamungeremu; Tatenda Tsumba; Itayi Vambe; Ngonidzashe Makusha	30 March 2019	Lefika Athletics Club Relay and Hurdles event	Gaborone, Botswana	
4 × 400 m relay	2:59.01 A	Dennis Bradley Hove; Leeford Zuze; Gerren Muwishi; Thandazani Ndhlovu	2 May 2026	World Relays	Gaborone, Botswana	

=== Women ===
Event	Record	Athlete	Date	Meet	Place	Ref.
100 m	11.36 (+1.2 m/s)	Winneth Dube	11 April 2003		Durban, South Africa	
200 m	23.23 (±0.0 m/s)	Winneth Dube	4 April 2003		Pretoria, South Africa	
300 m	36.48 A	Ashley Miller	28 April 2026	Simbine Classic	Pretoria, South Africa	
400 m	50.25	Vimbayi Maisvorewa	19 April 2025	Tom Jones Memorial	Gainesville, United States	
800 m	2:00.49	Julia Sakara	18 September 1998	Commonwealth Games	Kuala Lumpur, Malaysia	
1000 m	2:38.74	Julia Sakara	2 July 1994		Noisy-le-Grand, France	
1500 m	4:07.82	Julia Sakara	21 September 1998	Commonwealth Games	Kuala Lumpur, Malaysia	
3000 m	8:57.69	Julia Sakara	14 August 1993	World Championships	Stuttgart, Germany	
5000 m	15:40.43	Samukeliso Moyo	8 March 2000		Adelaide, Australia	
5 km (road)	16:22 (Note: It is unclear whether this was a mixed gender or women only race.)	Sharon Tavengwa	15 June 2008	Maastrichts Mooiste	Maastricht, Netherlands	
5 km (road)	16:26+ Wo	Fortunate Chidzivo	17 October 2020	World Half Marathon Championships	Gdynia, Poland	
10,000 m	33:20.16	Julia Sakara	19 August 1993	World Championships	Stuttgart, Germany	
10 km (road)	32:26	Fortunate Chidzivo	15 September 2019	Sanlam 10km Peace Run	Cape Town, South Africa	
15 km (road)	50:12+ Wo	Fortunate Chidzivo	17 October 2020	World Half Marathon Championships	Gdynia, Poland	
20 km (road)	1:07:16+ Wo	Fortunate Chidzivo	17 October 2020	World Half Marathon Championships	Gdynia, Poland	
Half marathon	1:10:50 Wo	Fortunate Chidzivo	17 October 2020	World Half Marathon Championships	Gdynia, Poland	
25 km (road)	1:32:18	Tabitha Tsatsa	9 May 2009		Pretoria, South Africa	
Marathon	2:29:20	Tabitha Tsatsa	16 March 2008	Seoul International Marathon	Seoul, South Korea	
100 m hurdles	12.92 (+1.0 m/s)	Ashley Miller	10 April 2026	Baylor Invitational	Waco, United States	
400 m hurdles	54.08	Ashley Miller	6 June 2026	USATF Lone Star Grand Prix	College Station, United States	
3000 m steeplechase	9:52.98	Letiwe Marakurwa	13 June 2003		Sacramento, United States	
High jump	1.77 m	Caroline Dickson	2 May 1977		Salisbury, Rhodesia	
Pole vault	2.60 m	Margaret Odendaal	2000			
Long jump	6.15 m	Dafros Mudyirwa	6 May 2000		Pittsburgh, United States	
Triple jump	13.02 m	Vimbiso Majoni	10/11 June 2017		Harare, Zimbabwe	
Shot put	15.58 m	Mariette Van Heerden	20 January 1974		Salisbury, Rhodesia	
Discus throw	55.70 m	Mariette Van Heerden	25 March 1984		Harare, Zimbabwe	
Hammer throw	21.40 m	Tendai Chiparaushe	16–22 August 2006		Chinhoyi, Zimbabwe	
Javelin throw	42.70 m	Wayne Nkomo	14 December 2016		Luanda, Angola	
Heptathlon	4293 pts	Lucky Denenga	13–14 May 2004		Louisville, United States	
Heptathlon	100m H (wind) / High jump / Shot put / 200m (wind) / Long jump (wind) / Javelin / 800m; 15.06w / 1.46 m / 10.83 m / 25.58w / 4.89 m / 27.63 m / 2:46.33					
Heptathlon	5266 pts	Sharon Coetzee	7–8 April 1984		Harare, Zimbabwe	
Heptathlon	100m H (wind) / High jump / Shot put / 200m (wind) / Long jump (wind) / Javelin / 800m					
20 km walk (road)						
50 km walk (road)						
4 × 100 m relay	45.74	Zimbabwe; D. Mawoko; Gailey Dube; S. Ncube; P. Chidziva	16 September 1995		Harare, Zimbabwe	
4 × 400 m relay	3:46.98	Zimbabwe	2 June 1996		Harare, Zimbabwe	

== Indoor ==
=== Men ===
Event	Record	Athlete	Date	Meet	Place	Ref.
55 m	6.24 A	Tatenda Tsumba	27 January 2018	Wildcat Open	Ogden, United States	
60 m	6.60	Ngonidzashe Makusha	27 February 2009	ACC Championships	Blacksburg, United States	
60 m	6.60	Gabriel Mvumvure	8 March 2014	World Championships	Sopot, Poland	
200 m	20.13	Makanakaishe Charamba	27 February 2025	SEC Championships	College Station, United States	
300 m	32.38	Takudzwa Chiyangwa	25 January 2025	Orange & Purple Invitational	Clemson, United States	
400 m	45.67	Lewis Banda	10 March 2006	NCAA Division I Championships	Fayetteville, United States	
800 m	1:47.78	Savieri Ngidhi	11 March 1995		Indianapolis, United States	
1500 m	3:44.43	Tapfumaneyi Jonga	6 March 1987	World Championships	Indianapolis, United States	
1500 m	3:41.82	Tapfumaneyi Jonga	1987			
3000 m	7:55.96	Tendai Chimusasa	4 February 1994		Berlin, Germany	
5000 m	14:16.58	Gray Mavhera	29 February 1996		Lincoln, United States	
60 m hurdles	7.94	Iain Harnden	19 February 2000	ACC Championships	Blacksburg, United States	
High jump	2.24 m	Kudakwashe Chadenga	17 February 2023	Texas Tech Matador Qualifier	Lubbock, United States	
High jump	2.26 m	Kudakwashe Chadenga	13 January 2023	TTU Corky Classic	Lubbock, United States	
Pole vault						
Long jump	8.21 m	Ngonidzashe Makusha	27 February 2009	ACC Championships	Blacksburg, United States	
Triple jump	16.95 m	Chengetayi Mapaya	13 March 2021	NCAA Division I Championships	Fayetteville, United States	
Shot put						
Heptathlon						
Heptathlon	60m / Long jump / Shot put / High jump / 60m H / Pole vault / 1000m					
5000 m walk						
4 × 400 m relay						

=== Women ===
Event	Record	Athlete	Date	Meet	Place	Ref.
60 m	7.52	Winneth Dube	12 January 2008		Calgary, Canada	
60 m	7.52	Winneth Dube	9 January 2010	Dino Classic	Calgary, Canada	
200 m	23.97	Vimbayi Maisvorewa	1 February 2025	Bob Pollock Invitational	Clemson, United States	
400 m	51.51	Vimbayi Maisvorewa	14 March 2025	NCAA Division I Championships	Virginia Beach, United States	
800 m	2:05.56	Privillege Chikara	31 January 2025	PNC Lenny Lyles Invitational	Louisville, United States	
1500 m	4:55.43y OT	Letiwe Marakurwa	7 March 2003	McDonald's Last Chance	Moscow, United States	
Mile	4:42.90	Privillege Chikara	31 January 2026	PNC Lenny Lyles Open	Louisville, United States	
3000 m	9:18.61	Faith Tawanda Nyathi	15 February 2025	Boston University David Hemery Valentine Invitational	Boston, United States	
5000 m	16:20.21	Faithy Kamangila	11 March 2005	NCAA Division I Championships	Fayetteville, United States	
60 m hurdles						
High jump						
Pole vault						
Long jump	5.83 m	Namatirai Grace Mavugara	23 January 2010	Hokie Invitational	Blacksburg, United States	
Triple jump	13.03 m	Namatirai Grace Mavugara	22 January 2010	Hokie Invitational	Blacksburg, United States	
Shot put						
Pentathlon						
Pentathlon	60m H / High jump / Shot put / Long jump / 800m					
3000 m walk						
4 × 400 m relay						
