= 2025 World Athletics Championships – Men's 4 × 400 metres relay =

Men's 4 × 400 metres relay at the 2025 World Athletics Championships
- Venue: National Stadium
- Location: Tokyo, Japan
- Date: 20 September (round 1); 21 September (final)
- Competitors: 76 from 16 nations
- Winning time: 2:57.76

Medalists
gold medal	Lee Eppie; Letsile Tebogo; Bayapo Ndori; Collen Kebinatshipi; Leungo Scotch*	Botswana
silver medal	Vernon Norwood; Jacory Patterson; Khaleb McRae; Rai Benjamin; Christopher Bailey*; Demarius Smith*; Bryce Deadmon*; Jenoah McKiver*	United States
bronze medal	Lythe Pillay; Udeme Okon; Wayde van Niekerk; Zakithi Nene; Gardeo Isaacs*; Leendert Koekemoer*	South Africa

The men's 4 × 400 metres relay at the 2025 World Athletics Championships was held at the National Stadium in Tokyo on 20 and 21 September 2025.

== Records ==
Before the competition, records were as follows:

Record	Athlete & Nat.	Perf.	Location	Date
World record	United States; Andrew Valmon, Quincy Watts, Butch Reynolds, Michael Johnson	2:54.29	Stuttgart, Germany	22 August 1993
Championship record	United States; Andrew Valmon, Quincy Watts, Butch Reynolds, Michael Johnson	2:54.29	Stuttgart, Germany	22 August 1993
World leading	South Africa (Gardeo Isaacs, Udeme Okon, Leendert Koekemoer, Zakithi Nene)	2:57.50	Guangzhou, China	11 May 2025
African record	Botswana (Bayapo Ndori, Busang Kebinatshipi, Anthony Pesela, Letsile Tebogo)	2:54.53	Paris, France	10 August 2024
Asian record	Japan (Yuki Joseph Nakajima, Kaito Kawabata, Fuga Sato, Kentaro Sato)	2:58.33	Paris, France	10 August 2024
European Record	Great Britain (Alex Haydock-Wilson, Matthew Hudson-Smith, Lewis Davey, Charlie Dobson)	2:55.83	Paris, France	10 August 2024
North, Central American and Caribbean record	United States; Andrew Valmon, Quincy Watts, Butch Reynolds, Michael Johnson	2:54.29	Stuttgart, Germany	22 August 1993
South American record	Brazil; Eronilde de Araújo, Sanderlei Parrela, Anderson Oliveira, Claudinei da Silva	2:58.56	Winnipeg, Canada	30 July 1999
Oceanian record	Australia; Bruce Frayne, Darren Clark, Gary Minihan, Rick Mitchell	2:59.70	Los Angeles, United States	11 August 1984

== Qualification standard ==
First fourteen placed teams at the 2025 World Athletics Relays and the next two highest placed teams on year top list.

== Schedule ==
The event schedule, in local time (UTC+9), was as follows:

Date	Time	Round
20 September	19:35	Round 1
21 September	20:20	Final

== Results ==
=== Round 1 ===
The first three in each heat ( Q ) and the next two fastest ( q ) qualified for the final.

==== Heat 1 ====
Results of heat 1
Place	Lane	Nation	Athletes	Time	Notes
1	6	South Africa	Gardeo Isaacs, Udeme Okon, Leendert Koekemoer, Lythe Pillay	2:58.81	Q
2	3	Qatar	Ammar Ibrahim, Bassem Hemeida, Ismail Abakar, Abderrahman Samba	3:00.15	Q, NR
3	9	Netherlands	Jonas Phijffers, Eugene Omalla, Ramsey Angela, Liemarvin Bonevacia	3:00.23	Q, SB
4	7	Kenya	George Mutinda, David Kapirante, Dennis Masika Mulongo, Kevin Kipkorir	3:00.76	
5	8	China	Liang Baotang, Zhang Qining, Liu Kai, Guo Longyu	3:00.77	NR
6	4	United States	Christopher Bailey, Demarius Smith, Bryce Deadmon, Jenoah McKiver	3:01.06	
7	5	France	Muhammad Abdallah Kounta, Loïc Prévot, David Sombé, Yann Spillman	3:01.64	
	2	Zambia	Muzala Samukonga, Kennedy Luchembe, Sitali Kakene, David Mulenga	DQ	TR24.21

==== Heat 2 ====
Results of heat 2
Place	Lane	Nation	Athletes	Time	Notes
1	8	Botswana	Lee Eppie, Leungo Scotch, Letsile Tebogo, Bayapo Ndori	2:57.68	Q, SB
2	6	Belgium	Jonathan Sacoor, Dylan Borlée, Daniel Segers, Alexander Doom	2:57.98	Q, SB
3	5	Great Britain & N.I.	Lee Thompson, Toby Harries, Seamus Derbyshire, Charlie Dobson	2:58.11	Q, SB
4	2	Jamaica	Bovel McPherson, Jevaughn Powell, Jasauna Dennis, Delano Kennedy	2:59.13	q, SB
5	7	Portugal	Pedro Afonso, Ericsson Tavares, João Coelho, Omar Elkhatib	2:59.70	q, NR
6	3	Japan	Yuki Joseph Nakajima, Fuga Sato, Takuho Yoshizu, Kenki Imaizumi	2:59.74	SB
	9	Australia	Cooper Sherman, Reece Holder, Aidan Murphy, Tom Reynolds	DQ	TR24.21
	4	Brazil	Tiago Lemes da Silva, Matheus Lima, Lucas Vilar, Alison dos Santos	DQ	TR24.21

==== Heat 3 (Re-run) ====
Results of heat 3
Place	Lane	Nation	Athletes	Time	Notes
1	4	United States	Christopher Bailey, Demarius Smith, Bryce Deadmon, Jenoah McKiver	2:58.48	qR, SB
2	7	Kenya	George Mutinda, David Kapirante, Dennis Masika Mulongo, Kevin Kipkorir	3:00.39	

=== Final ===
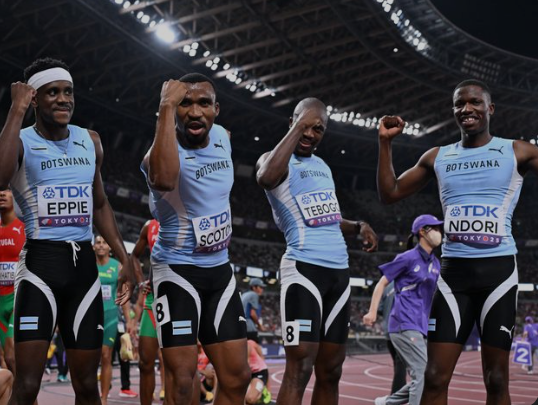
Botswana 4x400m team at the 2025 World Athletics Championships

Results of the final
Place	Lane	Nation	Athletes	Time	Notes
1st place, gold medalist(s)	5	Botswana	Lee Eppie, Letsile Tebogo, Bayapo Ndori, Collen Kebinatshipi	2:57.76	
2nd place, silver medalist(s)	1	United States	Vernon Norwood, Jacory Patterson, Khaleb McRae, Rai Benjamin	2:57.83	SB
3rd place, bronze medalist(s)	8	South Africa	Lythe Pillay, Udeme Okon, Wayde van Niekerk, Zakithi Nene	2:57.83	
4	7	Belgium	Jonathan Sacoor, Robin Vanderbemden, Alexander Doom, Daniel Segers	2:59.48	
5	6	Qatar	Ammar Ibrahim, Bassem Hemeida, Ismail Abakar, Abderrahman Samba	3:01.64	
6	9	Great Britain & N.I.	Lee Thompson, Toby Harries, Lewis Davey, Charlie Dobson	3:03.05	
7	3	Jamaica	Delano Kennedy, Jevaughn Powell, Jasauna Dennis, Rusheen McDonald	3:03.46	
8	4	Netherlands	Jonas Phijffers, Terrence Agard, Liemarvin Bonevacia, Ramsey Angela	3:04.84	
9	2	Portugal	Pedro Afonso, Omar Elkhatib, João Coelho, Ricardo dos Santos	3:09.06	
