= Brian Tinega =

Kenyan sprinter (born 2002)

Personal information
- Full name: Brian Onyari Tinega
- Born: 24 November 2002 (age 23)

Sport
- Sport: Athletics
- Event: Sprint
Medal record
Men's athletics
Representing Kenya
African Championships
| Silver medal – second place | 2024 Douala | 4×400 m relay |
World Relays
| Bronze medal – third place | 2025 Guangzhou | 4×400 m mixed |

Brian Onyari Tinega (born 24 November 2002) is a Kenyan sprinter who predominantly competes over 400 metres.

== Biography ==
In June 2024, he was a silver medalist with the men's 4 x 400 metres team at the 2024 African Championships in Athletics in Douala, Cameroon.

He won a bronze medal with the Kenyan mixed 4 x 400 metres relay team at the 2025 World Athletics Relays in Guangzhou, China in May 2025. He also ran alongside Zablon Ekwam, Boniface Mweresa and Kevin Kipkorir in the Kenyan men's 4 x 400 metres team which qualified for the final and ensured a place at the Tokyo World Athletics Championships in September 2025, setting the third fastest time in the qualifying round. He won the men's national 400m race at the Kip Keino Classic with a time of 45.06 seconds.

In June 2025, he ran 44.67 seconds to finish runner-up behind national champion George Mutinda in the men's 400m at the Kenyan National Championships, a time that was under the World Championship qualifying standard in the event. The following month, he was named in the Kenyan team for the individual 400 metres at the 2025 World Athletics Championships. He ran on the opening day in the mixed 4 × 400 metres relay. He also ran in the heats of the men's 400 metres without advancing to the semi-finals.

In March 2026, Tinega was named in the Kenyan team for the 2026 World Athletics Indoor Championships, and reached the final of the 400 metres, placing eighth overall in Toruń, Poland.
