= Khaleb McRae =

American sprinter (born 2000)

Personal information
- Born: 9 September 2000 (age 26)

Sport
- Country: United States
- Sport: Athletics
- Event: Sprint

Achievements and titles
- Personal bests: 200 m: 20.76 (2024); 400 m: 43.91 (2025); Indoors; 400 m: 44.52 (2026) WR
Medal record
Men's athletics
Representing United States
World Championships
| Silver medal – second place | 2025 Tokyo | 4 × 400 m relay |
World Indoor Championships
| Gold medal – first place | 2026 Toruń | 4 × 400 m relay |
| Silver medal – second place | 2026 Toruń | 400 m |

Khaleb McRae (born 9 September 2000) is an American sprinter. He is the reigning American champion over 400 metres indoors, having won the title at the 2026 USA Indoor Championships. He was the silver medalist in the 400 metres at the 2026 World Indoor Championships. In February 2026, he set a ratified indoor world record for the 400 metres of 44.52 seconds.

== Early life ==
McRae attended Southern School of Energy and Sustainability in Durham, North Carolina. He was a member of Durham Striders Track Club and won three North Carolina state titles. Whilst a high schooler in January 2018, he ran an American best time of 1:04.62 in the 500 m dash in Winston-Salem to move ahead of the previous best time by 0.35 seconds held by Randolph Ross. He later attended South Plains College in Texas and the University of Alabama.

== Career ==
=== Early career ===
In July 2023, he placed eighth in the 400 final at the USATF Outdoor Championships at Hayward Field in Eugene, Oregon. In February 2024, McRae moved to equal eleventh on the American indoor all-time list and twelfth all-time on the collegiate list when he ran 45.02 seconds for the 400 metres indoors in Albuquerque, New Mexico at the New Mexico Collegiate Classic.

In June 2024, he qualified for the final of the 400 metres at the US Olympic Trials in Eugene, Oregon, placing seventh overall in a time of 45.06 seconds.

=== 2025: World Championships debut ===
In April 2025, he finished second in 45.28 seconds to Zandrion Barnes in the men’s 400 m at the Drake Relays in Des Moines, Iowa. He competed at the 2025 World Athletics Relays in China in the Men's 4 × 400 metres relay in May 2025.

In May 2025, he was named as part of the long sprints category for the 2025 Grand Slam Track event in Philadelphia. He finished runner-up to Matthew Hudson-Smith in the 400 metres race in a time of 45.04 seconds at the 2025 Philadelphia Slam. On June 22, 2025 at the Bob Vigars Classic in London, Ontario, McRae ran a time of 43.91 seconds in the men's 400 m before placing fourth at the 2025 Prefontaine Classic on 5 July. On 2 August, he finished third at the 2025 USA Outdoor Track and Field Championships in 44.45 seconds.

In September 2025, he competed at the 2025 World Athletics Championships in Tokyo, Japan, reaching the semi-finals of the men's 400 metres. He later won a silver medal as part of the American team which ran the men's 4 × 400 metres relay final.

=== 2026: Indoor 400 m world record ===
On 24 January 2026, McRae won the 400 metres ahead of Quincy Wilson in 45.38 seconds at the Indoor Grand Prix, in Boston. On 13 February, McRae equalled the unratified American indoors 400 metres national record of Michael Norman with 44.52 seconds at the Tyson Invitational in Fayetteville, Arkansas, with the time also faster than the ratified indoor world record of 44.57 of Kerron Clement. McRae's world record was ratified by World Athletics on 23 July 2026.

On 1 March 2026, he won the 400 metres at the 2026 USA Indoor Track and Field Championships, running 45.01 seconds, the fastest winning time at the meet since Michael Johnson in 1996. He was selected to represent the United States at the 2026 World Athletics Indoor Championships in Toruń, Poland, and won the silver medal in the 400 metres, running 45.03 seconds in the final. He also ran in the men’s 4 × 400 metres with the team winning the gold medal. On 31 May, he ran 44.40 to place third in the 100 metres at the 2026 Diamond League in Rabat and ran 44.94 to place fourth on 7 June at the Diamond League event in Stockholm. On 4 July, McRae ran 44.91 seconds to place sixth over 400 m at the 2026 Prefontaine Classic. On 25 July, he placed second to Chris Bailey in the 400 metres final at the 2026 USA Championships in New York, running 44.41 seconds. At the 2026 Diamond League Final in Brussels in September, he placed eighth over 400 metres. Later that month, he competed over 400 m at the inaugural World Ultimate Championship in Budapest.

== Circuit performances ==
Grand Slam Track results
| Slam | Race group | Event | Pl. | Time | Prize money |
|---|---|---|---|---|---|
| 2025 Philadelphia Slam | Long sprints | 400 m | 2nd | 45.04 | US$25,000 |
| 2025 Philadelphia Slam | Long sprints | 200 m | 6th | 20.87 | US$25,000 |
