= Kabo Rankgwe =

Botswana athlete (born 2006)

Personal information
- Nationality: Botswana
- Born: Kabo David Rankgwe; 25 October 2003 (age 22)

Sport
- Sport: Athletics
- Event: Sprint

Achievements and titles
- Personal best: 400m: 45.64 (2025)
Medal record
Men's athletics
Representing Botswana
World Athletics Relays
Bronze medal – third place	2025 Guangzhou	4x400m relay

Kabo David Rankgwe (born 25 October 2003) is a sprinter from Botswana. He won a bronze medal in the 4 x 400 metres relay At the 2025 World Athletics Relays.

== Career ==
He is a member of Lefika Athletics Club. In June 2024, he ran 45.74 for the 400 metres as the Botswana Athletics Association (BAA) held an invitational Track and Field Series at the National Stadium in Gaborone. In March 2025, he ran a new personal best of 45.64 seconds for the 400 metres in Pretoria, South Africa.

He was selected to compete for Botswana at the 2025 World Athletics Relays in China in May 2025. He ran the third leg of the final handing over to more experienced a compatriot Leungo Scotch and building on a strong first leg from Lee Eppie as the Botswana men's 4 x 400 metres relay team came third in a time of 2:58.27 to win the bronze medals.
