= Aaliyah Butler =

American athlete (born 2003)

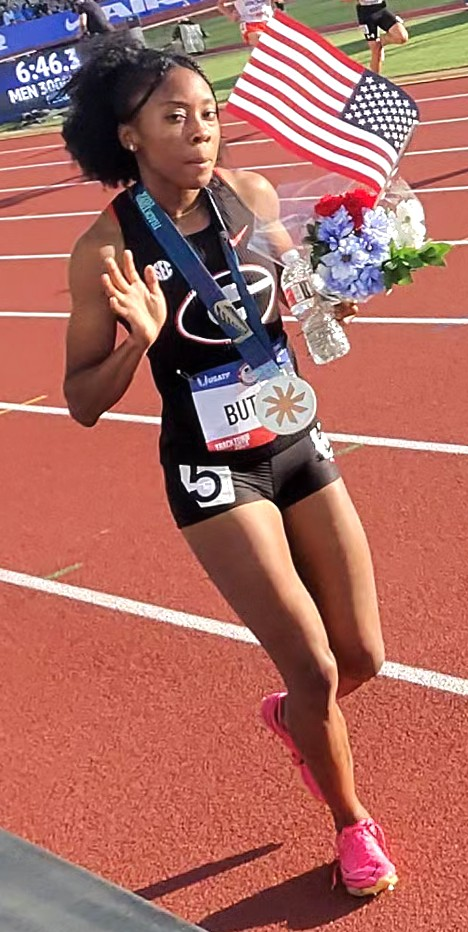
- Butler at the 2024 United States Olympic trials

Personal information
- Nationality: American
- Born: November 5, 2003 (age 22)

Sport
- Sport: Athletics
- Event: Sprint

Achievements and titles
- Personal bests: 400 m: 48.84 (Monaco, 2026)
Medal record
Women's athletics
Representing United States
Olympic Games
Gold medal – first place	2024 Paris	4 × 400 m relay
World Championships
Gold medal – first place	2025 Tokyo	4 × 400 m relay
World Ultimate Championship
First place	2026 Budapest	4 × 400 m mixed

Aaliyah Butler (/əˈliːə/ ə-LEE-ə; born November 5, 2003) is an American sprinter. She won the national title over 400 metres at the 2026 USA Outdoor Track and Field Championships.

== Early life ==
Butler is from Fort Lauderdale in Broward County, Florida. She attended Piper High School and Miami Northwestern Senior High School. In 2019, she beat the Florida high school state record set in the 400 meters by Sanya Richards-Ross. She began to attend the University of Georgia in 2022.

== Career ==
=== 2024 ===
Butler finished fourth in the 400 meters at the NCAA Division 1 Indoor Championships in Boston, Massachusetts in March 2024. She ran a personal best 49.79 seconds for the 400 meters at the SEC Championships in Gainesville, Florida in May 2024.

In June 2024, she finished second at the United States Olympic trials 400 m race in Eugene, Oregon, running 49.71 seconds. She competed at the 2024 Summer Olympics over 400 metres in August 2024, reaching the semi-final. She also competed in the women's 4 × 400 m relay at the Games, and won the gold medal as part of the American relay team.

=== 2025 ===
She signed an NIL deal with Nike in January 2025. On 1 March 2025, she moved to sixth on the women’s world indoor 400 m all-time list after running 49.78 at the Southeastern Conference Indoor Track & Field Championships in Texas. On 15 March 2025, she ran 49.97 for second place overall at the 2025 NCAA Indoor Championships in Virginia Beach.

On 19 April 2025, she lowered her personal best for the 400 metres to 49.44 seconds at the Tom Jones Memorial in Gainesville, Florida. In May 2025, she won the 400 metres at the SEC Championships and ran a 48.86 split in the 4 × 400 m, the third fastest split in college history, only behind Athing Mu and Britton Wilson. She won the 2025 NCAA Outdoor Championships in Eugene, Oregon, running 49.26 seconds. On the same track the following month she finished runner-up to Sydney McLaughlin-Levrone in the 400 metres at the 2025 Prefontaine Classic. She ran a personal best 49.09 seconds to place second at the 2025 Herculis event in Monaco, part of the 2025 Diamond League, 0.03 seconds behind Olympic champion Marileidy Paulino. She finished third in the final of the 400 metres at the 2025 USA Outdoor Track and Field Championships in 49.91 seconds.

Competing at the 2025 World Athletics Championships in Tokyo, she was a semi-finalist in the women's 400 metres. Prior to the World Championships, she announced that she will be turning professional.

=== 2026 ===
Competing in the 2026 Diamond League, Butler placed second to Nickisha Pryce of Jamaica in the 400 metres at the 2026 Shanghai Diamond League, running 49.78 seconds. On 4 June, she placed fourth in 49.83 seconds for the 400 m at the 2026 Golden Gala in Rome, before later winning the LA Grand Prix in 49.90 seconds that month. On 3 July, Butler was runner-up to Dejanea Oakley over 400 metres at the 2026 Prefontaine Classic. On 10 July, she ran a personal best 48.84 for 400 metres at the 2026 Herculis Diamond League event in Monaco. On 25 July, she won the 400 metres title at the 2026 USA Outdoor Track and Field Championships in New York, running 49.93 seconds. At the 2026 Diamond League Final in Brussels in September, she placed fourth in the 400 metres. Competing at the inaugural World Athletics Ultimate Championship in Budapest, Butler was a member of the American team that won the mixed 4 × 400 metres relay.
