= Athletics at the 2026 Commonwealth Games – Men's 400 metres =

Men's 400 metres at the 2026 Commonwealth Games
- Venue: Scotstoun Stadium, Glasgow
- Dates: 28 July 2026 (round 1); 30 July 2026 (semifinals); 1 August 2026 (final)
- Winning time: 44.25

Medalists
gold medal	Samuel Ogazi	Nigeria
silver medal	Jereem Richards	Trinidad and Tobago
bronze medal	Zakithi Nene	South Africa

The men's 400 metres at the 2026 Commonwealth Games, as part of the athletics programme, took place at the Scotstoun Stadium from 28 July to 1 August 2026. Zambia's champion from 2022, Muzala Samukonga, has been selected once more to defend his title.

== Records ==
Prior to this competition, the existing world and Games records were as follows:

Men's 400 m
World record	43.03	Wayde van Niekerk (RSA)	14 Aug 2016	Rio de Janeiro, Brazil
Commonwealth record	43.03	Wayde van Niekerk (RSA)	14 Aug 2016	Rio de Janeiro, Brazil
Games record	44.24	Kirani James (GRN)	30 Jul 2014	Glasgow, Scotland

== Schedule ==
The schedule is as follows:

Date	Time	Round
28 July 2026	12:00	Round 1
30 July 2026	13:10	Semi-finals
1 August 2026	12:00	Final

All times are United Kingdom time (UTC+1)

== Results ==
=== Round 1 ===
Round 1 took place on the morning of 28 July 2026. 16 best performers (q) advanced to the semi-finals.

==== Heat 1 ====
Place	Lane	Athlete	Nation	Time	Notes
1	4	Udo Edidiong	Nigeria	45.73	q
2	5	Desean Boyce	Barbados	46.55	q
3	6	Michael Francois	Grenada	46.62	
4	3	Adoli Haron	Uganda	47.27	
5	8	Rayvon Black	Turks and Caicos Islands	47.80	
6	7	Revon Williams	Guyana	48.25	
7	2	William Camilus Peka	Papua New Guinea	49.88	PB
8	1	Muhammad Ismail	Pakistan	50.60	SB

==== Heat 2 ====
Place	Lane	Athlete	Nation	Time	Notes
1	7	Kelvin Kiprotich Tonui	Kenya	45.69	q
2	5	Delano Kennedy	Jamaica	45.82	q
3	8	Michael Joseph	Saint Lucia	45.84	q
4	6	Patrick Nyambe	Zambia	45.94	q
5	4	Matthew Galea Soler	Malta	47.38	
6	2	Bongumuzi Matsebula	Eswatini	49.23	
7	3	Zeek Suad Hussain	Maldives	49.96	
8	1	Howard Tapuaiga Siila	Tuvalu	55.96	SB

==== Heat 3 ====
Place	Lane	Athlete	Nation	Time	Notes
1	3	Antonio Watson	Jamaica	46.36	q
2	2	George Mutuku	Kenya	46.50	q
3	4	Rajesh Ramesh	India	47.43	
4	6	Austin Cole	Canada	47.87	
5	7	Erick Okwii	Uganda	47.91	
6	8	Lerano Missick	Turks and Caicos Islands	48.83	
7	5	Riffath Adam	Maldives	50.91	

==== Heat 4 ====
Place	Lane	Athlete	Nation	Time	Notes
1	4	Zandrion Barnes	Jamaica	45.13	q, SB
2	2	Reece Holder	Australia	45.63	q
3	1	Jaden Marchan	Trinidad and Tobago	46.17	q
4	7	Kennedy Luchembe	Zambia	46.44	q
5	8	Simeon Adams	Guyana	47.35	SB
6	6	Mohamed Bah	Sierra Leone	49.20	SB
7	5	Mokheseng Kente	Lesotho	50.24	
8	3	Adin Corbette	Montserrat	51.31	

==== Heat 5 ====
Place	Lane	Athlete	Nation	Time	Notes
1	5	Jereem Richards	Trinidad and Tobago	45.72	q
2	3	Kalinga Kumarage	Sri Lanka	46.28	q
3	4	Brodie Young	Scotland	46.57	
4	7	Marvric Pamphile	Saint Lucia	47.12	
5	2	Kyle Gale	Barbados	47.41	
6	8	Mario Greenaway	Montserrat	49.53	
7	6	Adolf Kauba	Papua New Guinea	50.06	

==== Heat 6 ====
Place	Lane	Athlete	Nation	Time	Notes
1	5	Amal Glasgow	Saint Vincent and the Grenadines	46.03	q
2	8	Vishal Thennarasu	India	46.49	q
3	1	Elvis Khikhoe Gaseb	Namibia	47.30	
4	3	Joshem Sylvester	Grenada	48.17	
5	6	Daniel Baul	Papua New Guinea	49.34	
6	4	Md Lushad Islam	Bangladesh	49.76	SB
7	2	Neo Ntelele	Lesotho	51.20	
8	7	Luka Desoiza	Gibraltar	51.23	

=== Semi-finals ===
The semi-finals took place on morning of 30 July 2026. First 2 in each heat (Q) and the next 2 fastest (q) advance to the Final.

==== Heat 1 ====
Place	Lane	Athlete	Nation	Time	Notes
1	5	Samuel Ogazi	Nigeria	44.52	Q
2	6	Lee Eppie	Botswana	45.26	Q
3	8	Zandrion Barnes	Jamaica	45.38	q
4	7	Lythe Pillay	South Africa	45.87	
5	4	Jaden Marchan	Trinidad and Tobago	45.89	
6	3	Vishal Thennarasu	India	46.33	
7	2	Kennedy Luchembe	Zambia	46.60	
8	1	George Mutuku	Kenya	47.22	

==== Heat 2 ====
Place	Lane	Athlete	Nation	Time	Notes
1	5	Tom Reynolds	Australia	45.63	Q
2	7	Muzala Samukonga	Zambia	45.95	Q
3	4	Christopher Morales Williams	Canada	45.99	
4	3	Amal Glasgow	Saint Vincent and the Grenadines	46.46	
5	8	Delano Kennedy	Jamaica	46.52	
6	1	Michael Joseph	Saint Lucia	46.69	
7	6	Kelvin Kiprotich Tonui	Kenya	46.69	
—	2	Desean Boyce	Barbados	DNF	

==== Heat 3 ====
Place	Lane	Athlete	Nation	Time	Notes
1	7	Jereem Richards	Trinidad and Tobago	45.06	Q
2	8	Udo Edidiong	Nigeria	45.55	Q
3	4	Zakithi Nene	South Africa	45.70	q
4	3	Reece Holder	Australia	45.99	
5	5	Boniface Mweresa	Kenya	46.24	
6	2	Patrick Nyambe	Zambia	46.46	
7	1	Kalinga Kumarage	Sri Lanka	46.80	
—	6	Antonio Watson	Jamaica	DQ	

=== Final ===
The final took place on morning of 1 August 2026.

Place	Lane	Athlete	Nation	Time	Notes
1st place, gold medalist(s)	5	Samuel Ogazi	Nigeria	44.25	
2nd place, silver medalist(s)	4	Jereem Richards	Trinidad and Tobago	44.82	
3rd place, bronze medalist(s)	2	Zakithi Nene	South Africa	45.21	
4	6	Lee Eppie	Botswana	45.31	
5	7	Tom Reynolds	Australia	45.57	
6	8	Muzala Samukonga	Zambia	45.61	
7	1	Zandrion Barnes	Jamaica	45.68	
8	3	Udo Edidiong	Nigeria	45.81	
