= 2026 World Athletics Ultimate Championship – Men's 400 metres =

Men's 400 metres at the 2026 World Athletics Ultimate Championship
- Venue: National Athletics Centre
- Location: Budapest, Hungary
- Dates: 11 September 2026 (semi-finals); 12 September 2026 (final)
- Competitors: 16 from 11 nations
- Winning time: 43.39 s NR

Champion
- Collen Kebinatshipi; Botswana

The men's 400 metres was held over two rounds at the 2026 World Athletics Ultimate Championship at the National Athletics Centre in Budapest, Hungary on 11 and 12 September 2026. It was the first time the World Ultimate Championship is held. Athletes qualified by wildcard or by their world ranking.

== Background ==
Global records before the 2026 World Athletics Ultimate Championship
Record	Time	Athlete (nation)	Location	Date
World record	43.03	Wayde van Niekerk (RSA)	Rio de Janeiro, Brazil	14 August 2016
World lead	43.38	Samuel Ogazi (NGR)	Eugene, United States	12 June 2026

Area records before the 2026 World Athletics Ultimate Championship
Record	Time	Athlete (nation)	Location	Date
African record	43.03	Wayde van Niekerk (RSA)	Rio de Janeiro, Brazil	14 August 2016
Asian record	43.93	Youssef Ahmed Masrahi (KSA)	Beijing, China	23 August 2015
European record	43.44	Matthew Hudson-Smith (GBR)	Paris, France	7 August 2024
North, Central American, and Caribbean record	43.18	Michael Johnson (USA)	Seville, Spain	26 August 1999
Oceanian record	44.38	Darren Clark (AUS)	Seoul, South Korea	26 September 1988
South American record	43.93	Anthony Zambrano (COL)	Tokyo, Japan	2 August 2021

== Qualification ==
For the 400 metres, sixteen athletes qualified, up to three by wildcard for winners of the event at the 2024 Summer Olympic, the 2025 World Athletics Championships, or the 2026 Diamond League final and the others by their position at the World Athletics Rankings for the event on 3 September 2026.

== Results ==
=== Semi-finals ===
The semi-finals were held on 11 September at 19:19 (UTC+2). First 4 of each heat (Q) qualified to the final.

==== Heat 1 ====
Place	Lane	Athlete	Nation	Time	Notes
1	7	Collen Kebinatshipi	Botswana	44.23	Q
2	9	Chris Bailey	United States	44.28 [.274]	Q
3	8	Rai Benjamin	United States	44.28 [.276]	Q
4	6	Jereem Richards	Trinidad and Tobago	44.44	Q
5	3	Christopher Morales Williams	Canada	44.98	
6	4	Bayapo Ndori	Botswana	45.00	
7	5	Muzala Samukonga	Zambia	45.51	
8	2	Muhammad Abdallah Kounta	France	45.53	
9	1	Patrik Simon Enyingi	Hungary	45.72	

==== Heat 2 ====
Place	Lane	Athlete	Nation	Time	Notes
1	8	Jacory Patterson	United States	44.73	Q
2	7	Matthew Hudson-Smith	Great Britain	44.79	Q
3	4	Lee Eppie	Botswana	44.85	Q
4	9	Attila Molnár	Hungary	44.97	Q
5	2	Yuki Joseph Nakajima	Japan	45.00	
6	3	Jonas Phijffers	Netherlands	45.21	
7	6	Zakithi Nene	South Africa	45.30	
8	5	Khaleb McRae	United States	46.55	

=== Final ===
The final was held on 12 September at 18:18 (UTC+2).

Place	Lane	Athlete	Nation	Time	Notes
1st place, gold medalist(s)	7	Collen Kebinatshipi	Botswana	43.39	NR
2	4	Rai Benjamin	United States	44.15	
3	2	Jereem Richards	Trinidad and Tobago	44.23	
4	8	Chris Bailey	United States	44.27	
5	5	Matthew Hudson-Smith	Great Britain	44.28	
6	6	Jacory Patterson	United States	44.59	
7	9	Lee Eppie	Botswana	44.66	
8	3	Attila Molnár	Hungary	45.10	
