= Zablon Ekwam =

Kenyan athlete (born 1997)

Personal information
- Full name: Zablon Ekhal Ekwam
- Born: 4 August 1997 (age 29) Todonyang, Turkana County, Kenya

Sport
- Sport: Athletics
- Event: 400 metres
- Club: Ndura Athletics

Achievements and titles
- Personal bests: 200 m: 20.47 (Nairobi, 2025); 400 m: 44.69 (Nairobi, 2024)
Medal record
Men's athletics
Representing Kenya
World Relays
Bronze medal – third place	2025 Guangzhou	4 × 400 m mixed

Zablon Ekhal Ekwam (born 4 August 1997) is a Kenyan sprinter who competes predominantly over 400 metres and became Kenyan national champion over 200 metres in 2025.

== Biography ==
Running for Ndura Athletics Club, he ran a 45.65 seconds 400 metres victory at the Athletics Kenya (AK) weekend meet in March 2021. However, he spent time in the second of 2021 and part of 2022 in military training for the Kenya Defence Forces. After joining the military, he began to be coached by Ian Dexter.

He won the Kenyan national 400 metres title in June 2023, running a personal best time of 45.47 seconds in Nairobi. He competed in the mixed 4 × 400 metres relay, and men's 4 × 400 metres relay at the 2023 World Athletics Championships in Budapest.

In March 2024, he competed in the men's 4 × 400 metres relay at the 2024 World Athletics Indoor Championships in Glasgow. The men's relay team set a new indoor African record at the event, running 3:06.96 to break the continent's record set by Nigeria in 2014.

He lowered his personal best to 45.19 seconds at the Kenyan World Relays Trials in Nairobi in April 2024. Zablon Ekhal Ekwam ran under the Paris 2024 Olympic qualifying time with a personal best of 44.69 in the 400 metres at the Kip Keino Classic in Nairobi. He was selected for the Kenyan 4 × 400 relay team for the 2024 World Athletics Relays in Nassau, Bahamas in May 2024. In June 2024, he named in the Kenyan team for the 2024 Paris Olympics.

He competed at the 2025 World Athletics Relays in China in the men's 4 × 400 metres relay in May 2025 and ran in the final alongside Kevin Kipkorir, Boniface Mweresa and Kelvin Tonui as the Kenyan team placed fifth in a national record time of 2:59.29. He ran 45.01 seconds to finish third in the 400 metres at the Kip Keino Classic in Nairobi on 31 May 2025. He won the 200 metres at the Kenyan Athletics Championships in June 2025, finishing in a personal best 20.47 metres to beat Ferdinand Omanyala by 0.6 seconds. He was named in the Kenyan relay pool for the 2025 World Athletics Championships.

In June 2026, he retained the 200 m title at the Kenyan Championships in 20.82 seconds. In July, he was a semi-finalist in the 200 metres at the 2026 Commonwealth Games in Glasgow, Scotland. He also ran in the men's 4 × 100 m relay.
