= Tabitha Tsatsa =

Zimbabwean marathon runner

Personal information
- Full name: Tabitha Tsatsa
- Nationality: Zimbabwe
- Born: 18 September 1972 (age 53)
- Height: 1.58 m (5 ft 2 in)
- Weight: 44 kg (97 lb)

Sport
- Country: Zimbabwe
- Sport: Athletics
- Event: Marathon
- Club: Power House Athletics Club

Achievements and titles
- Personal bests: Half-marathon: 1:12:16 (2009); Marathon: 2:29:20 (2008)

Tabitha Tsatsa (Shona pronunciation: [taˈb̪i̥t̪a ˈt͡sat͡sa]; born September 18, 1972) is a Zimbabwean marathon elite veteran runner. She set both a national record and a personal best time of 2:29:20, by finishing fourth at the 2008 Dong-A Seoul International Marathon, held in Seoul, South Korea.

== Career ==
Tabitha was the first female runner to represent Zimbabwe at the 2008 Summer Olympics in Beijing, where she competed as a lone female athlete in the women's marathon. She successfully finished the race in forty-ninth place by two seconds ahead of Turkey's Bahar Doğan, with a time of 2:37:10.

In 2007, Tabitha founded her own athletics club called Power House Athletics in Zimbabwe, where she helps and assists emerging athletes and most of the elite athletes in the Southern Region. Some of her training partners and beneficiaries include Hellalia Johannes, a Namibian marathon runner who in 2019 broke three Namibian records and achieved her greatest career landmark by earning a medal at the Athletics World Championships, for her third place in the Marathon. She also assisted Winile Mnisi and Tokky Hou, both from Swaziland, Jeniffer Sithole from South Africa who is also running her own club in South Africa. Some of the runners in Zimbabwe she assisted and worked with include Fortunate Chidzivo the current national 10 km record holder, and Rudo Mhonderwa who qualified twice for the World Cross Country Championships and recently represented the country at the IAAF World Cross Country Championships in Denmark in 2019, and also Patience Murove who represented the country at the World Half Marathon Championships 2019. Currently, she is mentoring junior athletes under the Power House Athletics Club, such as Golden Mhonderwa, Proud Mubvakure and Miriam Sibanda.

As part of her mentoring and women and youth in sport, Tabitha is also running a programme targeted at mostly women and youth in Chitungwiza, a dormitory town under the title Chitungwiza Community Club, which she started in 2017 and was launched in 2019. This programme has attracted partnership from the JM Busha 54 Races. Tabitha also embarked on an outreach programme, whereby she focuses on rural, remote and high-density areas to educate women and youth about the benefits of athletics. She has also inspired many women to do community start-ups to earn a living. This has been the main thrust of her mentorship programme which mainly targets women and youth who come from unprivileged backgrounds.

== Two Oceans Marathon controversy ==
In the women's Old Mutual Two Oceans Ultra Marathon 2013, Natalia Volgina from Russia won the race for the second time, after first winning it 11 years ago. She won it in a time of 3:38:38, followed in second by Tabitha Tsatsa in 3:39:57, with Charne Bosman third in 3:40:19. Soon after Natalie Volgina tested positive for the banned anabolic steroid metenolone. She was stripped of her title with 1st place shifting onto Tabitha Tsatsa.
