= Vimbayi Maisvorewa =

Zimbabwean athlete (born 2000)

Personal information
- Nationality: Zimbabwean
- Born: 25 January 2000 (age 26)

Sport
- Sport: Athletics
- Event: Sprint

Achievements and titles
- Personal bests: 400m: 55.09 (2025) NR; Indoors; 400m: 51.51 (2025) NR

Vimbayi Maisvorewa (25 January 2000) is a Zimbabwean sprinter. She is the national record holder over 400 metres, both outdoors and indoors.

== Early and personal life ==
She is from Rusape and was educated at Dope High School and Hillcrest College in Zimbabwe. In 2022, she received a scholarship to attend Cloud County Community College in the United States and then later attended the Auburn University. She later transferred to the Georgia Bulldogs track and field team.

== Career ==
She placed sixth over 800 metres whilst competing at the 2017 IAAF World U18 Championships in Nairobi, Kenya.

Competing in the United States in February 2022, she set a new Zimbabwean indoor national record for the 400 metres with a time of 54.65 seconds at the National Junior College Athletic Association (NJCAA) Region VI Championships, before breaking her own record with 53.86 seconds a few weeks later. She won the 2022 NJCAA Outdoor title in the 400 metres in 54.18 seconds and the 2023 NJCAA Indoor title, in 53.50 seconds. She received the Senior Women Athlete of the Year award at the 2023 National Athletics Association of Zimbabwe (NAAZ) Awards in January 2024.

In March 2025, Maisvorewa lowered Zimbabwe’s indoor 400m national record to 51.51 seconds. Later that year, she broke the ten-year-old Zimbabwean national record for the outdoors 400 metres when she ran 50.25 seconds at the Tom Jones Memorial in Florida. The time also placed her below the automatic qualifying mark by a full half-second for the upcoming World Championships. She subsequently competed as part of the Zimbabwean team at the 2025 World Athletics Championships in Tokyo, Japan, in the women's 400 metres.
