= Silas Senchura =

Kenyan long-distance runner (born 2005)

Personal information
- Born: 12 July 2005 (age 21)

Sport
- Sport: Athletics
- Events: Long-distance running, Cross country running

Achievements and titles
- Personal bests: 10,000m: 28:18.46 (Nairobi, 2025)
Medal record
Men's athletics
Representing Kenya
African Championships
Bronze medal – third place	2026 Accra	10,000 m

Silas Senchura (born 12 July 2005) is a Kenyan long-distance and cross country runner. He won the Kenyan Athletics Championships in 2025 and was also the bronze medalist over 10,000 metres at the 2026 African Championships.

== Biography ==
Senchura had a victory in the men's 10,000 metres during the fifth leg of the Betika Athletics Kenya (AK) Track and Field Weekend Meeting at the Ulinzi Sports Complex in Nairobi in April 2025, winning in 29:09.49 He then won over 10,000 metres at the Kip Keino Classic in 28:18.46 in May 2025. In June, he also won over that distance at the Kenyan Athletics Championships in Nairobi. In November 2025, he was runner-up to Anthony Kibiwot in the Men's 10,000m race during the Nairobi Region BingwaFest held at the Kasarani Annex.

In February 2026, he placed third at the Sirikwa Cross Country Classic in Kenya and ran 26:58 to place fourth at the 10k at the 10K Facsa Castellón, a World Athletics Label road race, in Spain. In May, he represented Kenya over 10,000 metres at the 2026 African Championships in Athletics in Accra, Ghana, winning the bronze medal behind Kenyan compatriot Kevin Chesang and Hagos Eyob of Ethiopia, running 28:34.97.
