= 2026 African Championships in Athletics =

2026 African Championships
- Dates: 12–17 May
- Host city: Accra, Ghana
- Venue: Legon Sports Stadium
- Events: 45

The 24th African Championships in Athletics was held in Accra, Ghana from 12 to 17 May 2026, at the Legon Sports Stadium. This was the first time the event took place in Ghana, although the country has previously hosted the 2023 African Games.

== Medal summary ==
=== Men ===
Chronology: 2022 | 2024 | 2026 | 2028 | 2030

Event	Gold		Silver		Bronze	
100 metres	Emmanuel Eseme; Cameroon	10.42	Bradley Nkoana; South Africa	10.46	Chidera Ezeakor; Nigeria	10.50
200 metres	Cheickna Traore; Ivory Coast	20.32	Prince Phaezel Selepe; Botswana	20.43	Mihlali Xhotyeni; South Africa	20.57
400 metres	Lee Eppie; Botswana	44.66	Dennis Hove; Zimbabwe	44.92	Leeford Zuze; Zimbabwe	45.03
800 metres	Kelvin Kimtai Loti; Kenya	1:45.47	Imad Bouchajda; Morocco	1:45.62	Alex Amankwah; Ghana	1:46.18
1500 metres	Luan Munnik; South Africa	3:42.19	Tshepo Tshite; South Africa	3:42.31	Brian Komen; Kenya	3:43.48
5000 metres	Dawit Seare; Eritrea	13:16.92	Mubin Haji; Ethiopia	13:18.33	Laban Kiptoo Kosgei; Kenya	13:18.92
10,000 metres	Kevin Chesang; Kenya	28:30.44	Hagos Eyob; Ethiopia	28:30.57	Silas Senchura; Kenya	28:32.66
110 metres hurdles	Badamassi Saguirou; Niger	13.73	Louis François Mendy; Senegal	13.81	Yousuf Badawy Sayed; Egypt	13.82
400 metres hurdles	Tisang Kemorena; Botswana	48.66	Victor Ntweng; Botswana	49.21	Wernich van Rensburg; South Africa	49.35
3000 metres steeplechase	Gemechu Godana; Ethiopia	8:38.37	Salaheddine Ben Yazide; Morocco	8:41.02	Samuel Firew; Ethiopia	8:41.67
4 × 100 metres relay	Ivory Coast; Cheickna Traore; Abdulrazak Koné; Magas Traoré; Arthur Cissé	38.52	Nigeria; Favour Ashe; James Taiwo Emmanuel; Tejiri Godwin; Chidera Ezeakor	38.70	Ghana; Abdul-Rasheed Saminu; Edwin Kwabla Gadayi; Joseph Amoah; Ibrahim Fuseini	38.74
4 × 400 metres relay	Zimbabwe; Dennis Hove; Leeford Zuze; Gerren Muwishi; Thandazani Ndhlovu	3:01.12	Kenya; George Mutinda; Dennis Masika Mulongo; Samuel Chege Waweru; Kelvin Kiprotich Tonui	3:01.35	Morocco; Walid El Boussiri; Rachid Mhamdi; Yassine Hssine; Mohamed Yassine Zerhoumi	3:01.36
20 kilometres walk	Misgana Wakuma; Ethiopia	1:18:47 CR, NR	Stephen Ndangiri Kihu; Kenya	1:20:01	Yasin Abduselam Abdulwahab; Ethiopia	1:21:07
High jump	Younes Ayachi; Algeria	2.22 m	Matao le Roux; South Africa	2.16 m	Kemboi Asbel Kiprop; Kenya	2.13 m
Pole vault	Valco van Wyk; South Africa	5.40 m	Boubacar Diallo; Mali	4.60 m	Dhiae Boudoumi; Algeria	4.20 m
Long jump	Luvo Manyonga; South Africa	8.15 m	Lys Mendy; Senegal	8.07 m	Amath Faye; Senegal	8.00 m
Triple jump	Amath Faye; Senegal	17.00 m	Adel Cupidon; Mauritius	16.61 m	Yoann Awhansou; Benin	16.60 m
Shot put	Aiden Smith; South Africa	20.01 m	Mostafa Amr Hassan; Egypt	18.89 m	Billy Takougoum Kuitche; Cameroon	17.01 m
Discus throw	Ryan Williams; Namibia	57.45 m	Lucien Wangba; Cameroon	57.18 m	Righardt Stander; South Africa	56.13 m
Hammer throw	Mostafa El Gamel; Egypt	72.58 m	Ahmed Tarek Ismail; Egypt	68.27 m	Tshepang Makhethe; South Africa	67.27 m
Javelin throw	Julius Yego; Kenya	79.87 m	Otag Ubang; Ethiopia	77.60 m	Douw Smit; South Africa	76.70 m
Decathlon	Nicolas Huys; Ivory Coast	7285 pts	Edwin Kipmutai Too; Kenya	7120 pts	Morne van As; South Africa	7029 pts

=== Women ===
Chronology: 2022 | 2024 | 2026 | 2028 | 2030

Event	Gold		Silver		Bronze	
100 metres	Herverge Kole Etame; Cameroon	11.49	Rosemary Chukwuma; Nigeria	11.49	Thelma Davies; Liberia	11.51
200 metres	Maboundou Koné; Ivory Coast	23.35	Rosemary Chukwuma; Nigeria	23.59	Symone Darius; Liberia	23.59
400 metres	Ajayeba Aliye; Ethiopia	51.54	Obakeng Kamberuk; Botswana	51.79	Florence Agyeman; Ghana	51.87
800 metres	Msgana Hailu; Ethiopia	1:59.02	Nowe Oratile; Botswana	1:59.09	Samira Awali Boubacar; Niger	1:59.63
1500 metres	Karabo More; South Africa	4:15.40	Vivian Chebet Kiprotich; Kenya	4:15.50	Souad El Haddad; Morocco	4:16.00
5000 metres	Emeline Imanizabayo; Rwanda	15:46.62	Samiyah Hassan Nour; Djibouti	15:47.05	Ziyn Ayelegn; Ethiopia	15:47.95
10,000 metres	Diana Wanza; Kenya	31:33.26	Florence Niyonkuru; Rwanda	31:43.73 NR	Asefu Abreha; Ethiopia	31:45.91
100 metres hurdles	Tobi Amusan; Nigeria	12.83	Ashley Miller; Zimbabwe	13.24	Adaobi Tabugbo; Nigeria	13.26
400 metres hurdles	Rogail Joseph; South Africa	54.73	Dinedye Denis; Ivory Coast	55.15	Linda Angounou; Cameroon	56.23
3000 metres steeplechase	Diana Chepkemoi; Kenya	9:29.18	Mercy Koskey Chepngeno; Kenya	9:30.46	Almaz Yohannis; Ethiopia	9:33.46
4 × 100 metres relay	Nigeria; Rosemary Nwankwo; Obi Jennifer Chukwuka; Rosemary Chukwuma; Miracle Ezechukwu	42.94 CR	Liberia; Destiny Smith-Barnett; Symone Darius; Chante Clinkscale; Thelma Davies	43.05	Ghana; Gladys Boateng; Aishatu Jaffar; Janet Mensah; Janet Kwateng Darkoah	44.85
4 × 400 metres relay	Nigeria; Esther Okon; Toheebat Jimoh; Jecinta Lawrence; Patience Okon George	3:29.31	Ethiopia; Derartu Anota; Banchalem Bikese; Banchiayehu Tesema; Ajayeba Aliye	3:33.44	Kenya; Diana Chepkemoi; Lillian Dianah Aoko Owako; Lanoline Aoko; Hellen Syombua	3:33.80
20 kilometres walk	Wubalem Shugute; Ethiopia	1:33:31	Silvia Kemboi; Kenya	1:33:44	Souad Azzi; Algeria	1:34:28
High jump	Kristi Snyman; South Africa	1.84 m	Esther Obenewaa; Ghana	1.81 m	Betselot Alemayehu; Ethiopia	1.75 m
Pole vault	Ansume de Beer; South Africa	4.30 m CR, AU20R	Dorra Mahfoudi; Tunisia	3.70 m	Tamer Reem; Egypt; Talaya Vorster; Namibia	3.50 m
Long jump	Nemata Nikiema; Burkina Faso	6.76 m	Marthe Koala; Burkina Faso	6.75 m	Marie-Jeanne Ourega; Ivory Coast	6.70 m w
Triple jump	Saly Sarr; Senegal	14.71 m	Liliane Potiron; Mauritius	13.94 m	Zinzi Xulu; South Africa	13.43 m
Shot put	Colette Uys; South Africa	17.63 m	Carine Mékam; Gabon	16.71 m	Belinda Oburu; Kenya	16.39 m
Discus throw	Nora Atim Monie; Cameroon	57.00 m	Divine Oladipupo; Nigeria	55.37 m	Obiageri Amaechi; Nigeria	53.32 m
Hammer throw	Zahra Tatar; Algeria	69.82 m CR	Sade Olatoye; Nigeria	69.60 m	Leandri Holtzhausen; South Africa	66.99 m
Javelin throw	Aseel Osama Abdel Hamid; Egypt	60.97 m AU20R, NR	Arianne Duarte Morais; Cape Verde	56.43 m	Jana van Schalkwyk; South Africa	54.36 m
Heptathlon	Odile Ahouanwanou; Benin	5309 pts	Enya Pooler; South Africa	5255 pts	Adèle Mafogang; Cameroon	5227 pts

=== Mixed ===
Event	Gold		Silver		Bronze	
4 × 400 metres relay	Nigeria; Ezekiel Asuquo; Toheebat Jimoh; Victor Sampson; Patience Okon George	3:16.44	Botswana; Leungo Scotch; Kennekae Batisani; Victor Ntweng; Karabo Mantswinyane	3:17.88	Kenya; Samuel Chege Waweru; Lanoline Aoko; Dennis Masika Mulongo; Maureen Najala	3:17.98

== Medal table ==
* Host nation (Ghana)

Rank	Nation	Gold	Silver	Bronze	Total
1	South Africa (RSA)	9	4	9	22
2	Kenya (KEN)	5	6	7	18
3	Ethiopia (ETH)	5	4	6	15
4	Nigeria (NGR)	4	5	3	12
5	Ivory Coast (CIV)	4	1	1	6
6	Cameroon (CMR)	3	1	3	7
7	Botswana (BOT)	2	5	0	7
8	Egypt (EGY)	2	2	2	6
9	Senegal (SEN)	2	2	1	5
10	Algeria (ALG)	2	0	2	4
11	Zimbabwe (ZIM)	1	2	1	4
12	Burkina Faso (BUR)	1	1	0	2
12	Rwanda (RWA)	1	1	0	2
14	Benin (BEN)	1	0	1	2
14	Namibia (NAM)	1	0	1	2
14	Niger (NIG)	1	0	1	2
17	Eritrea (ERI)	1	0	0	1
18	Morocco (MAR)	0	2	2	4
19	Mauritius (MRI)	0	2	0	2
20	Ghana (GHA)*	0	1	4	5
21	Liberia (LBR)	0	1	2	3
22	Cape Verde (CPV)	0	1	0	1
22	Djibouti (DJI)	0	1	0	1
22	Gabon (GAB)	0	1	0	1
22	Mali (MLI)	0	1	0	1
22	Tunisia (TUN)	0	1	0	1
Totals (26 entries)		45	45	46	136

== Participating nations ==
- Algeria (10)
- Angola
- Benin
- Botswana
- Burkina Faso
- Burundi
- Cameroon
- Cape Verde
- Central African Republic
- Chad
- Comoros
- Democratic Republic of the Congo
- Djibouti
- Egypt (16)
- Equatorial Guinea
- Eritrea
- Eswatini
- Ethiopia (50)
- Gabon
- Gambia
- Ghana (Host)
- Guinea
- Guinea-Bissau
- Ivory Coast
- Kenya (74)
- Lesotho
- Liberia
- Libya
- Madagascar
- Malawi
- Mali
- Mauritius (10)
- Morocco
- Mozambique
- Namibia
- Niger
- Nigeria
- Republic of the Congo
- São Tomé and Príncipe
- Senegal
- Seychelles
- Sierra Leone
- Somalia
- South Africa
- South Sudan
- Togo
- Tunisia
- Uganda
- Zambia
- Zimbabwe
