= Mthi Mthimkulu =

South African sprinter (born 2003)

Personal information
- Born: 30 April 2003 (age 23)

Sport
- Sport: Athletics
- Event: Sprint

Achievements and titles
- Personal bests: 100m: 10.23 (2026); 200m: 20.48 (2026); 400m: 45.42 (2025)
Medal record
Men's athletics
Representing South Africa
World Relays
Gold medal – first place	2025 Guangzhou	4×400 m relay
Silver medal – second place	2026 Gaborone	4×400 m relay
African Championships
Gold medal – first place	2024 Douala	Mixed 4×400 m relay
Summer World University Games
Silver medal – second place	2025 Bochum	4×100 m relay
Silver medal – second place	2025 Bochum	Mixed 4×400 m relay

Mthi Mthimkulu (born 30 April 2003) is a South African sprinter who primarily competes over 400 metres. He was a gold medalist at the 2024 African Championships in the mixed 4x400 metres relay, as part of a South African team which set a new national record.

== Early life ==
He attended Riebeeckstad High School on Welkom in a scholarship, before moving to Bloemfontein in 2020. He later studied at the University of the Free State in South Africa.

== Career ==
He is training under the guidance of coach Thomas Jonda after he represented South Africa at the 2022 World Athletics U20 Championships in Cali, Colombia and the 2024 World Athletics Relays in Nassau, The Bahamas. He won the Free State championship title over 400 metres seven times consecutively between 2018 and 2024.

He was part of the South African mixed 4x400m relay team alomgsode Gardeo Isaacs, Shirley Nekhubuie and Miranda Coetzee which won the gold medal and ran a new national record of 3:13.12 at the 2024 African Championships in Douala, Cameroon in June 2024.

He was selected for the South African relay pool at the 2025 World Athletics Relays in China, where ran in the Men's 4 × 400 metres relay heats as the South African team qualified for the upcoming World Championships. The following day he ran in the Mixed 4 × 400 metres relay final as the South African team placed fifth overall.

He won two silver medals at the 2025 Summer World University Games in Bochum, Germany; in the men's 4 x 100 metres relay and the mixed 4 x 400 metres relay.

He was selected for the South African team for the 2025 World Athletics Championships in Tokyo, Japan.

Competing on the opening day at the 2026 World Athletics Relays on 2 May, he was part of the South African men's 4 x 400 metres team which won their heat in 2:58.04. The following day, he ran as the team won the silver medal and set a new South African national record 2:55.07 to move to fifth on the all-time list. In July, he was a semi-finalist in the 200 metres at the 2026 Commonwealth Games in Glasgow, Scotland.
