= Kevin Kipkorir =

Kenyan sprinter (born 1994)

Personal information
- Born: 1 August 1994 (age 32)

Sport
- Sport: Athletics
- Event: Sprint
Medal record
Men's athletics
Representing Kenya
African Championships
Silver medal – second place	2024 Douala	4×400 m relay

Kevin Kipkorir (born 1 August 1994) is a Kenyan sprinter who predominantly competes over 400 metres.

== Biography ==
In June 2024, he was a silver medalist with the men's 4 x 400 metres team at the 2024 African Championships in Athletics in Douala, Cameroon.

In April 2025, he won the 400 metres in Nairobi at the national trials. He competed at the 2025 World Athletics Relays in Guangzhou, China in May 2025, running alongside Zablon Ekwam, Boniface Mweresa and Brian Tinega in the Kenyan men's 4 x 400 metres team which qualified for the final and ensured a place at the Tokyo World Athletics Championships in September 2025, setting the third fastest time in the qualifying round. He also ran in the final with alongside Ekwam, Mweresa and Kelvin Tonui as the Kenyan team placed fifth in a national record time of 2:59.29. He finished second in the men's national 400m race at the Kip Keino Classic with a time of 45.29, finishing behind Brian Tinega. In June 2025, he ran 44.80 seconds to finish third behind Tinega and national champion George Mutinda in the men's 400m at the Kenyan National Championships, a time that was under the World Championship qualifying standard in the event.

The following month, he was named in the Kenyan team for the 2025 World Athletics Championships, where he ran in the heats of the men's 400 metres without advancing to the semi-finals. He also ran at the championships in the men's 4 x 400 metres relay.
