= Justice Oratile =

Botswana athlete (born 2006)

Personal information
- Nationality: Botswana
- Born: 21 May 2006 (age 20)

Sport
- Sport: Athletics
- Event: Sprint

Achievements and titles
- Personal best: 400m: 44.61 (2026)
Medal record
Men's athletics
Representing Botswana
World Athletics Relays
Gold medal – first place	2026 Gaborone	4×400 m relay
Bronze medal – third place	2025 Guangzhou	4x400m relay
African U20 Championships
Gold medal – first place	2025 Abeokuta	200m
Gold medal – first place	2025 Abeokuta	400m
Gold medal – first place	2025 Abeokuta	4 x 400m relay

Justice Oratile (born 21 May 2006) is a sprinter from Botswana. He won a bronze medal in the 4 x 400 metres relay At the 2025 World Athletics Relays.

== Biography ==
Oratile is a member of Lefika Athletics Club. In August 2024, he was selected to compete for Botswana at the 2024 World Athletics U20 Championships in Lima, Peru.

In April 2025, Oratile ran a new personal best of 45.29 seconds for the 400 metres at the Potch Invitational Meet in Potchefstroom, South Africa. He was selected to compete for Botswana at the 2025 World Athletics Relays in China in May 2025. He ran the second leg of the final following a strong first leg from compatriot Lee Eppie as the Botswana men's 4 x 400 metres relay team came third in a time of 2:58.27 to win the bronze medals. In July 2025, he won gold medals over 200 metres, 400 metres and in the men's 4 x 400 metres relay at the African U20 Championships.

In April 2026, Oratile lowered his personal best over 400 metres to 44.61 seconds at the Hezekiel Sepeng Invitational in South Africa. In May, he ran at the 2026 World Athletics Relays in the men's 4 × 400 metres relay in Gaborone, Botswana. In July, he was a semi-finalist in the 200 metres at the 2026 Commonwealth Games in Glasgow, Scotland.
