= Daniel Segers =

Belgian sprinter (born 2001)

Personal information
- Born: 1 February 2001 (age 25)

Sport
- Sport: Athletics
- Event: Sprint

Achievements and titles
- Personal bests: 400m: 44.63 (2025); Long Jump 7.89m (2020) NU20R
Medal record
Men's athletics
Representing Belgium
World Relays
Silver medal – second place	2025 Guangzhou	4×400 m relay

Daniel Segers (born 1 February 2001) is a Belgian sprinter. He was the Belgian indoor national champion in 2025 in the 400 metres. He previously won the Belgian Athletics Championships in the long jump.

== Biography ==
From Dendermonde, as a junior athlete he competed in the decathlon. He represented Belgium at the 2017 European Youth Olympic Festival in Győr, Hungary winning gold in the long jump. He won the senior Belgian Athletics Championships long jump title in Brussels in 2020, with a best jump of 7.89 metres.

Having given up long jump due to a succession of injuries, he switched to train under Jacques Borlée from mid-October 2024. In February 2025, he won the Belgian national indoor 400 metres title. He subsequently competed for Belgium at the 2025 European Athletics Indoor Championships in Apeldoorn, Netherlands. He was the fifth fastest qualifier for the semi-finals with a new indoor personal best of 46.11 seconds.

He was selected for the Belgian relay pool at the 2025 World Athletics Relays in China, where he was a silver medalist in the Men's 4 × 400 metres relay. He also competed in the Mixed 4 × 400 metres relay at the event. He set a personal best of 44.63 seconds to win the 400 metres at the Golden Spike Ostrava on 24 June. He ran 44.90 seconds to place fourth in the 2025 Diamond League at the 2025 Memorial Van Damme in Brussels, Belgium, on 22 August. He placed sixth in the 400 metres at the Diamond League Final in Zurich on 28 August.

He was selected for the Belgian team for the 2025 World Athletics Championships in Tokyo, Japan, running 45.04 in his heat of the men's 400 metres without advancing to the semi-finals. He also ran as part of the Belgian men's 4 x 400 metres relay team which placed fourth in the final on the final day of the championships.

In May 2026, he ran at the 2026 World Athletics Relays in the men's 4 × 400 metres relay in Gaborone, Botswana. On 16 June, he placed second over 400 metres to Atilla Molnar in 44.81 seconds at the Golden Spike meeting in Ostrava. Competing at the 2026 European Athletics Championships in Birmingham, England in August, he was a finalist in the 400 metres, placing eighth overall. He also competed in the men's 4 × 400 metres relay at the championships. At the 2026 Diamond League Final in Brussels in September, he placed seventh over 400 metres.
