= Zandrion Barnes =

Jamaican athlete (born 2001)

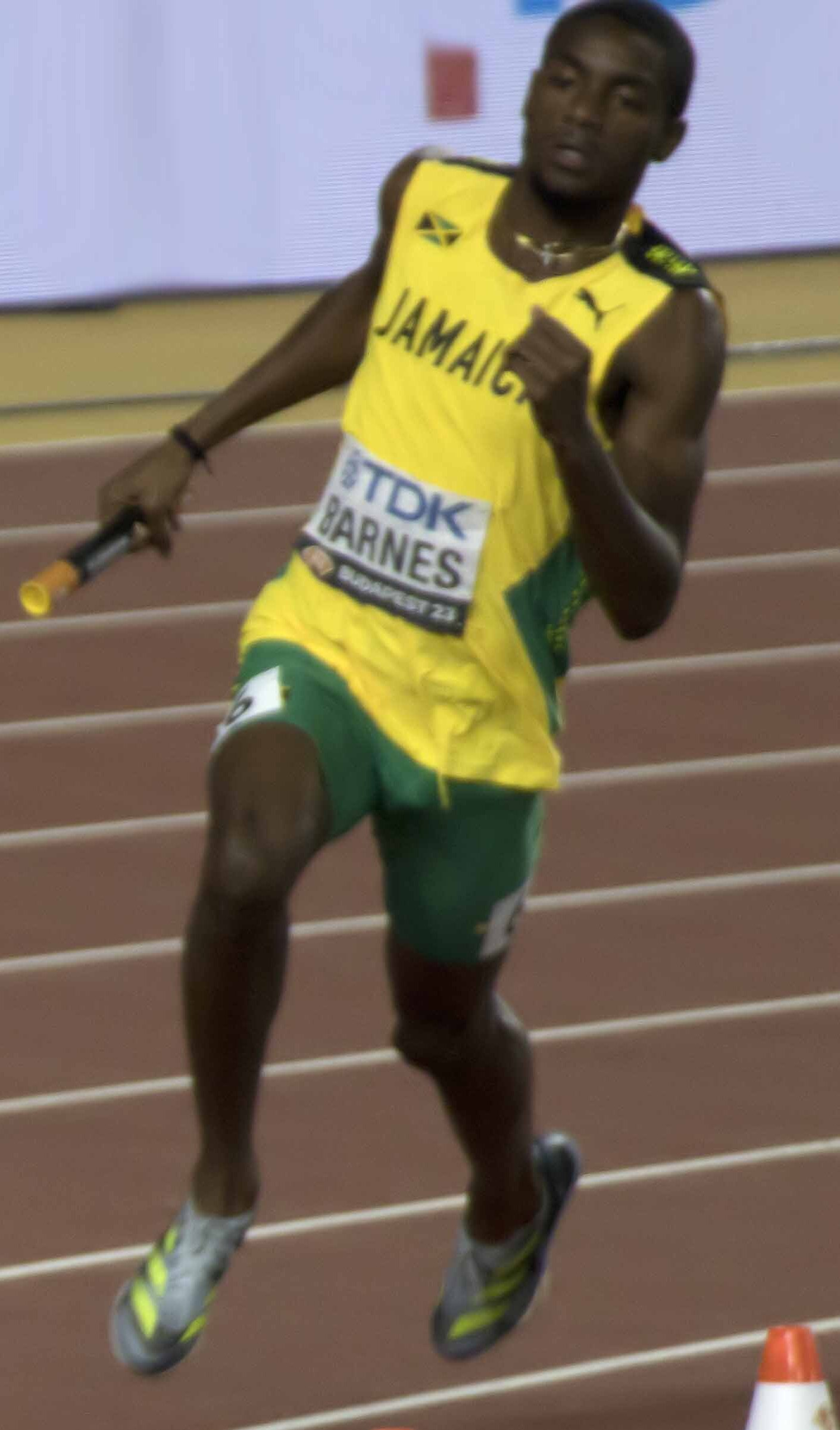
- Barnes in 2023

Personal information
- Nationality: Jamaican
- Born: 17 August 2001 (age 25)

Sport
- Sport: Athletics
- Event: Sprint
- College team: GC Foster College
- Club: SprinTec
- Coached by: Maurice Wilson

Achievements and titles
- Personal bests: 400m: 44.90 (Kingston, 2023)
Medal record
Men's athletics
Representing Jamaica
Commonwealth Games
Gold medal – first place	2026 Glasgow	4×400m Mixed relay
NACAC Championships
Gold medal – first place	2025 Freeport	4×400m relay
Gold medal – first place	2025 Freeport	4×400m Mixed relay

Zandrion Barnes (born 17 August 2001) is a Jamaican track and field athlete who competes over 400 metres.

== Early life ==
Barnes attended Manchester High School in Manchester, Jamaica where he won the DaCosta Cup in the 400 metres. Then, he got an athletics scholarship to attend GC Foster College in St. Catherine, Jamaica.

== 2023 ==
Barnes reached final of the 400 metres at the Jamaican national championship in Kingston in 2023. In June 2023, he ran a new personal best 400m time of 44.90 and followed this up by winning his first ever overseas event, in New York. He also won the following month in Trinidad and Tobago.

Barnes was selected for the 2023 World Athletics Championships in Budapest in 2023, where he qualified for the semi-finals.

== 2024 ==
In April 2024, he was selected as part of the Jamiacan team for the 2024 World Athletics Relays in Nassau, The Bahamas. He competed in the mixed 4 x 400 metres relay at the 2024 Paris Olympics.

== 2025 ==
In April 2025, he won ahead of Khaleb McRae in the men's 400m at the Drake Relays in Des Moines, Iowa in a time of 45.29 seconds. He competed at the 2025 World Athletics Relays in China in the Men's 4 × 400 metres relay in May 2025. He reached the final of the 400 metres at the Jamaican Athletics Championships in June 2025. He was a gold medalist at the 2025 NACAC Championships in Freeport, The Bahamas in both the mixed 4x400 metres relay and men's 400 metres relay. He was selected for the Jamaican relay team for the 2025 World Athletics Championships in Tokyo, Japan, running in the mixed 4 × 400 metres relay.

== 2026 ==
In July 2026, he was a finalist in the 400 metres at the 2026 Commonwealth Games in Glasgow, Scotland. Later at the Games, he won a gold medal in the mixed 4 × 400 m relay at the Games.

== Statistics ==
Grand Slam Track results
Slam	Race group	Event	Pl.	Time	Prize money
2025 Kingston Slam	Long sprints	400 m	8th	DQ	US$10,000
2025 Kingston Slam	Long sprints	200 m		21.59	US$10,000
