= Lee Eppie =

Motswana athlete (born 1999)

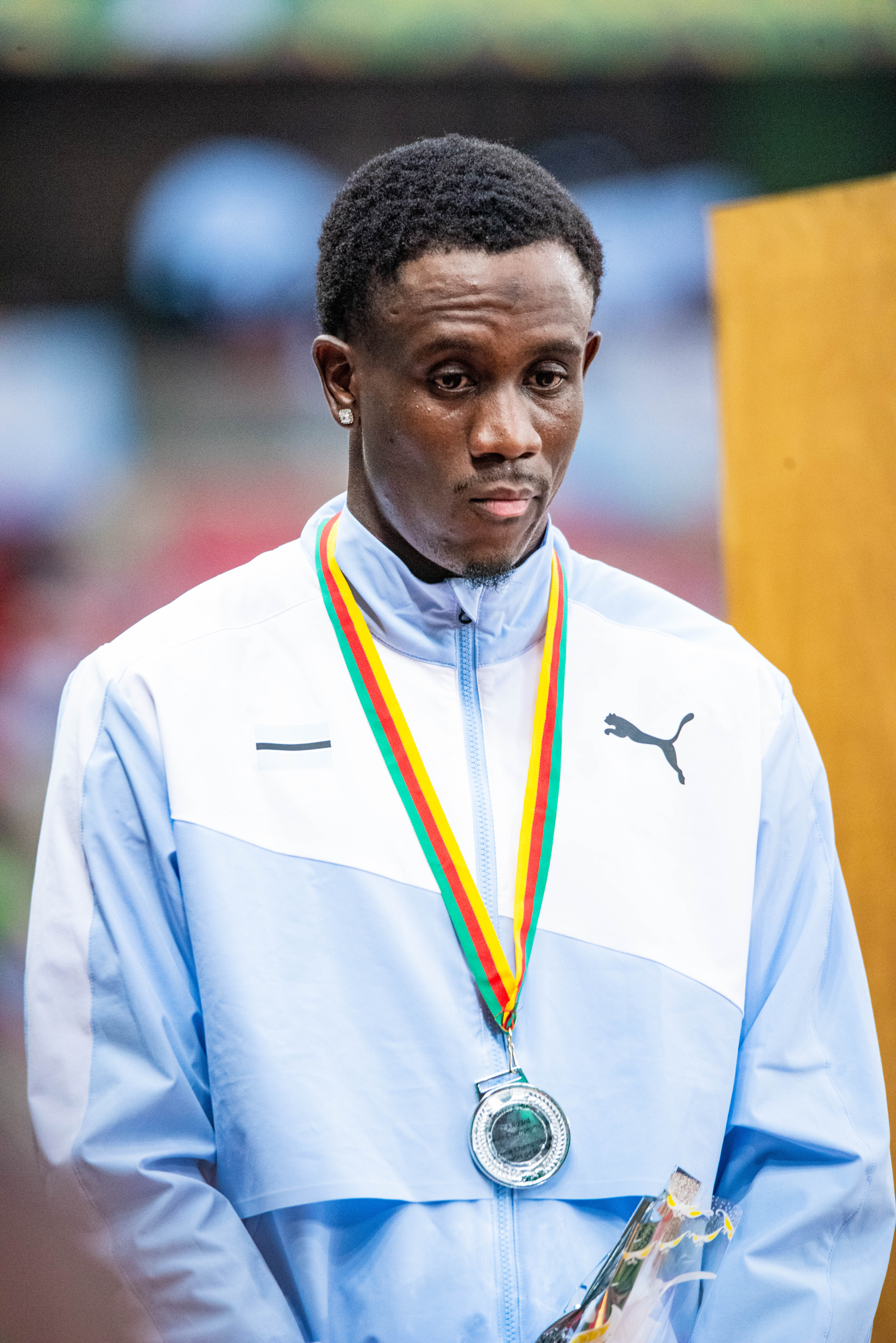
- Eppie in 2024

Personal information
- Full name: Lee Bhekempilo Eppie
- Nationality: Botswana
- Born: 18 May 1999 (age 27)

Sport
- Sport: Athletics
- Event: Sprint

Achievements and titles
- Personal bests: 400 m: 44.40 (Francistown, 2025)
Medal record
Men's athletics
Representing Botswana
World Championships
Gold medal – first place	2025 Tokyo	4 × 400 m relay
African Championships
Gold medal – first place	2026 Accra	400 m
Silver medal – second place	2024 Douala	400 m
World Athletics Relays
Gold medal – first place	2026 Gaborone	4×400 m relay
Bronze medal – third place	2025 Guangzhou	4 × 400 m relay
African U20 Championships
Silver medal – second place	2017 Tlemcen	4 × 400 m relay

Lee Bhekempilo Eppie (born 18 May 1999) is a sprinter from Botswana. He was the gold medalist at the 2026 African Championships over 400 metres and a gold medalist in the 4 × 400 metres relay at the 2026 World Athletics Relays and 2025 World Athletics Championships.

== Early life ==
In 2012 he started competing in athletics at primary school, and continued at both junior and senior school under the tutelage of Johnson Kubisa. In 2019, he moved to the United States to study and train at Mississippi State University.

== Career ==
He was a silver medalist for Botswana in the men's 4 × 400 metres relay at the 2017 African U20 Championships in Athletics in Tlemcen, Algeria.

He won a silver medal at the 2024 African Championships in Athletics in the Men's 400 metres, running a personal best of 45.39 seconds to finish runner-up to Senegalese athlete Cheikh Tidiane Diouf in Douala, Cameroon in June 2024. He was named for the Botswana relay pool for the 2024 Olympic Games in Paris in August 2024, although he did not race at the Games.

In March 2025, he lowered his personal best to 45.20 seconds for the 400 metres. He was selected to compete for Botswana at the 2025 World Athletics Relays in China, winning a bronze medal as the Botswana men's 4 × 400 metres relay team came third in a time of 2:58.27. Over the summer of 2025 Eppie continued to lower his personal best on the 400 metres. First in June with a 45.00 in Geneva, follower by a 44.88 in July in Heusden-Zolder and finally a 44.40 in August in Francistown.

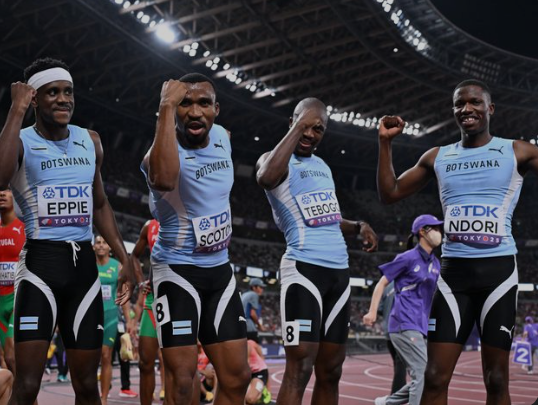
Eppie with the Botswana relay team at the 2025 World Championships

In September 2025, Eppie competed at the World Championships for the first time in his career. After coming in second in both his heat and semi-final he qualified for the final of the 400 metres, where he placed eighth. He later won a gold medal as part of the Botswana team in the men's 4 x 400 metres relay.

Competing at the 2026 World Athletics Relays in Gaborone, he ran in the final of the men's 4 x 400 m relay as the Botswana team ran a championship and national record of 2:54.47 to win the gold medal and move to third on the world all-time list. Later that month, he won the gold medal in the 400 metres at the 2026 African Championships in Athletics in Accra, Ghana, running 44.60 seconds to win ahead of Dennis Hove and Leeford Zuze of Zimbabwe. In July 2026, he placed fourth overall in the final of the 400 metres at the 2026 Commonwealth Games in Glasgow, Scotland. In September, he was a finalist over 400 m at the inaugural World Ultimate Championship in Budapest, placing seventh overall.

== Personal life ==
Whilst he was studying at Mississippi State University, he was a roommate of Jamaican Olympic athlete Navasky Anderson.
