= Toby Harries =

British athlete (born 1998)

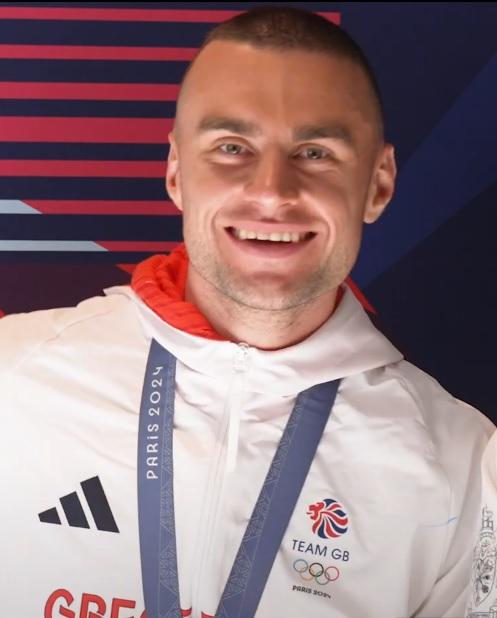
- Harries in 2024

Personal information
- Nationality: British (English)
- Born: 30 September 1998 (age 28) Brighton, England
- Education: University College London

Sport
- Sport: Athletics
- Event: Sprint
- Club: Brighton AC

Achievements and titles
- Personal bests: 200 m: 20.22 (Clermont, 2025); 400 m: 45.13 (Geneva, 2025)
Medal record
Men's athletics
Representing Great Britain
Olympic Games
Bronze medal – third place	2024 Paris	4 × 400 m
World Ultimate Championship
Second place	2026 Budapest	Mixed 4 × 400 m relay
European Championships
Silver medal – second place	2026 Birmingham	4 × 400 m relay
Silver medal – second place	2026 Birmingham	4 × 400 m mixed
European U20 Championships
Gold medal – first place	2017 Grosseto	200 m
Representing England
Commonwealth Games
Silver medal – second place	2026 Glasgow	4 × 400 m Mixed

Toby Harries (born 30 September 1998) is a British track and field athlete who competes as an England and Team GB sprinter. He is a two-time British indoor champion over 200 metres and a 2024 Olympics bronze medallist in the 4 × 400 m relay. In 2026 he won three major medals with a silver in the mixed 4 x 400m relay in the Commonwealth Games and two silver medals in the 4 x 400m Men’s and mixed relays at the European Championships in Birmingham. The 2026 season ended on a high with a second place in the World Ultimates in Budapest .

== Early life ==
From Brighton, Harries attended Westbourne House School and Brighton College. He graduated from University College London (UCL) in 2021 with a Bachelor of Science in Biology.

== Career ==
Harries broke the UK indoor under-17 200 m record when he ran 21.46 to win the England Athletics Under-17 Indoor Championship in 2015. In February 2016, Harries won the men's 200 m title at the 2016 British Indoor Athletics Championships in Sheffield. He won the gold medal in the 200 metres at the 2017 European Athletics U20 Championships in Grosseto, Italy.

At the 2019 British National Championships in the 400 metres he ran a personal best of 46.36s in the heats, and finished in fifth place in the final. He subsequently competed for Great Britain in the 4 × 400 m relay the 2019 World Athletics Championships in Doha. He won a second British national title at the 2022 British Indoor Athletics Championships in Birmingham in February 2022.

In April 2024, he was selected as part of the British team for the 2024 World Athletics Relays in Nassau, Bahamas. In May 2024, he was also selected to represent Britain in the 4 × 400 m relay at the 2024 European Athletics Championships in Rome. He was part of the men's 4 × 400 m relay team which won their heat to qualify for the final. In July, Harries was named in the Great Britain 4 × 400 metres relay squad for the 2024 Summer Olympics. He ran in the heats, and therefore was eligible for the bronze medal that they won.

He was named in the British team for the 2025 World Athletics Relays in Guangzhou. He ran in the men's 4 × 400 metres relay, alongside Charlie Dobson, Efe Okoro and Rio Mitcham as the British quartet finished a close second to Belgium in their heat to qualify for the final and secure a place for Britain at the 2025 World Championships. He was selected for the 200 metres at the 2025 European Athletics Team Championships in Madrid in June 2025, where he finished third in the 200 metres and ran a 43.6 seconds split in the mixed 4 × 400 metres, in which Britain finished third in the same time as the second-placed Italian team. On 3 August, placed third in the final of the 400 metres at the 2025 UK Athletics Championships in Birmingham, running 45.98 seconds. He was selected as part of the British team for the 2025 World Athletics Championships in Tokyo, Japan. He ran on the opening day as the British team finished fifth overall in the mixed 4 × 400 metres relay. He also ran in the men's 200 metres, without advancing to the final. Later at the Championships, he ran in the men's 4 × 400 metres relay as the British team qualified for the final and placed sixth overall.

In May 2026, he ran at the 2026 World Athletics Relays in the men's 4 × 400 metres relay in Gaborone, Botswana. In June, he placed fourth in the final of the 400 metres at the 2026 British Championships. He was selected to represent England at the 2026 Commonwealth Games in Glasgow, winning a silver medal in the mixed 4 × 400 metres relay. On 10 August, he won a silver medal competing for Great Britain at the 2026 European Athletics Championships in the mixed 4 × 400 metres relay in Birmingham. On the final night of the championships he returned to the track and won the silver medal with the British team in the men's 4 × 400 metres final. In September, selected as part of the Great Britain team to compete at the inaugural World Athletics Ultimate Championship in Budapest, he ran in the mixed 4 × 400 metres relay, as the team placed second overall.

== Personal life ==
Toby trains in West London under coach David Sadkin, as part of a high-caliber training group that includes Faith Akinbileje, the 2025 100 m UK bronze medalist.
