= Sitali Kakene =

Zambian sprinter (born 2003)

Personal information
- Born: 7 November 2003 (age 23)

Sport
- Sport: Athletics
- Event: Sprint

Achievements and titles
- Personal bests: 200m: 20.62s (2023); 400m: 46.50s (2023)

Sitali Kakene (born 7 November 2003) is a Zambian sprinter. He represented Zambia at the 2025 World Athletics Championships.

== Biography ==
He was a member of the Zambian 4 x 400 metres relay team at the delayed 2023 African Games held in Accra, Ghana, in March 2024. He ran as part of the Zambian 4 × 400 m relay team at the World Relays Championships in Nassau, Bahamas in May 2024.

He competed at the 2025 World Athletics Relays in Guangzhou, China in May 2025. He subsequently competed at the 2025 World Athletics Championships in Tokyo, Japan as part of the Zambian team who were disqualified from the men’s 4 x 400 metres relay after they clashed in racing incidents with the teams from Kenya and United States.
