= Leeford Zuze =

Zimbabwean sprinter

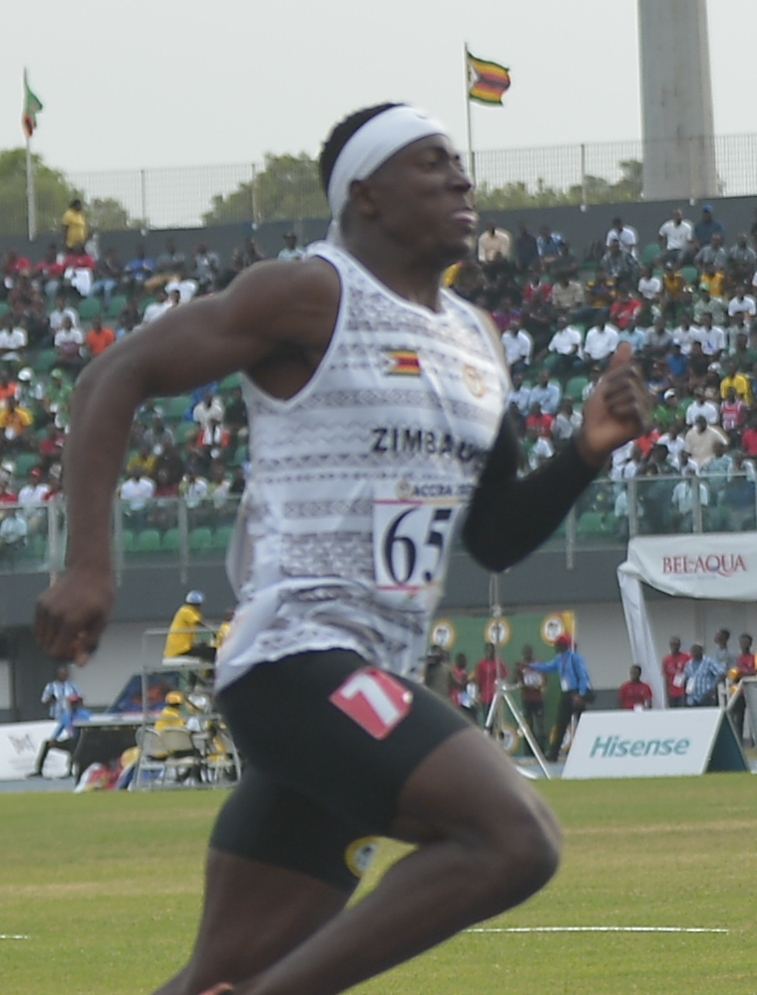
- Competing at the 2023 African Games

Personal information
- Born: 2 April 2001 (age 25)

Sport
- Sport: Athletics
- Event: Sprint

Achievements and titles
- Personal best(s): 200m: 21.36 (2025); 400m: 44.91 (2026)
Medal record
Men's athletics
Representing Zimbabwe
African Championships
Gold medal – first place	2026 Accra	4x400 m relay
Bronze medal – third place	2026 Accra	400 m

Leeford Zuze (born 2 April 2001) is a Zimbabwean sprinter. He was the bronze medalist over 400 metres at the 2026 African Championships in Athletics.

== Biography ==
Nicknamed "Monya", Zuze comes from the rural area of Chirumhanzu and was educated at Mapiravana Secondary School. He was a member of Raising Stars Athletics Club in Chirumhanzu before joining MWC Sports in Harare.

Zuze set a personal best for the 400 metres of 48.12 in 2023;, lowering it to 46.13 in early 2024. Competing for Zimbabwe at the delayed 2023 Africa Games in Accra, Ghana, in March 2024, he was part of the Zimbabwe men's relay team, placing sixth in the finals of both the men's 4 x 100 metres relay relay and men's 4 x 400 metres relay.

In March 2026, he was part of the Zimbabwe men's 4 x 400 metres relay team alongside Thandazani Ndhlovu, Dennis Hove and Gerren Muwishi. They set a new national record of clock 3:00.69 at the Lefika International Relays held at the Gaborone National Stadium breaking the long-standing previous national record which had stood for 29 years since 1997. The following month, he ran a new personal best for the 400 metres of 44.91 seconds.

He competed for Zimbabwe at the 2026 World Athletics Relays in Gaborone, Botswana. Competing in the men's 4 x 400 metres relay alongside Ndhlovu, Dennis Hove, and Gerren Muwishi to a 2:59.01 national record on 2 May 2026, to finish third in their heat and qualify the team for the final with the sixth fastest overall, and also qualify for the 2027 World Championships. In the final, the quartet placed fifth overall with a time of 2:59.79. Later that month, he won the bronze medal in the 400 metres at the 2026 African Championships in Athletics in Accra, Ghana, finishing behind compatriot Dennis Hove and Lee Eppie of Botswana. He also won the gold medal on the final day of the championships in the men’s 4 x 400 metres relay.
