= Thandazani Ndhlovu =

Zimbabwean sprinter

Personal information
- Born: 23 November 2004 (age 21)

Sport
- Sport: Athletics
- Event: Sprint

Achievements and titles
- Personal best(s): 200m: 21.18 (2026); 400m: 44.71 (2026)
Medal record
Men's athletics
Representing Zimbabwe
African Championships
Gold medal – first place	2026 Accra	4x400 m relay

Thandazani Ndhlovu (born 23 November 2004) is a Zimbabwean sprinter.

== Biography ==
From Bulawayo, Ndhlovu moved his training base to Harare in 2026. In March 2026, he was part of the Zimbabwe men's 4 x 400 metres relay team alongside Leeford Zuze, Dennis Hove and Gerren Muwishi which set a new national record of clock 3:00.69 at the Lefika International Relays held at the Gaborone National Stadium breaking the long-standing previous national record which had stood for 29 years since 1997.

In April 2026, Ndhlovu set a new Zimbabwe national best for the 300 metres with a time of 32.06 seconds in Pretoria, South Africa moved to second on the 400 metres on the Zimbabwe all-time list with a time of 44.71 seconds at the Botswana Golden Grand Prix.

Ndhlovu represented Zimbabwe at the 2026 World Athletics Relays in Gaborone, Botswana. Competing in the men's 4 x 400 metres relay, anchoring the team of Ndhlovu, Dennis Hove, Leeford Zuze and Gerren Muwishi to a 2:59.01 national record on 2 May 2026, to finish third in their heat and qualify the team for the final with the sixth fastest overall, and also qualify for the 2027 World Championships. In the final, the quartet placed fifth overall with a time of 2:59.79. Later that month, he ran at the 2026 African Championships in Athletics in Accra, Ghana, and won the gold medal on the final day of the championships in the men’s 4 x 400 metres relay.
