= Fortunate Chidzivo =

Zimbabwean athlete

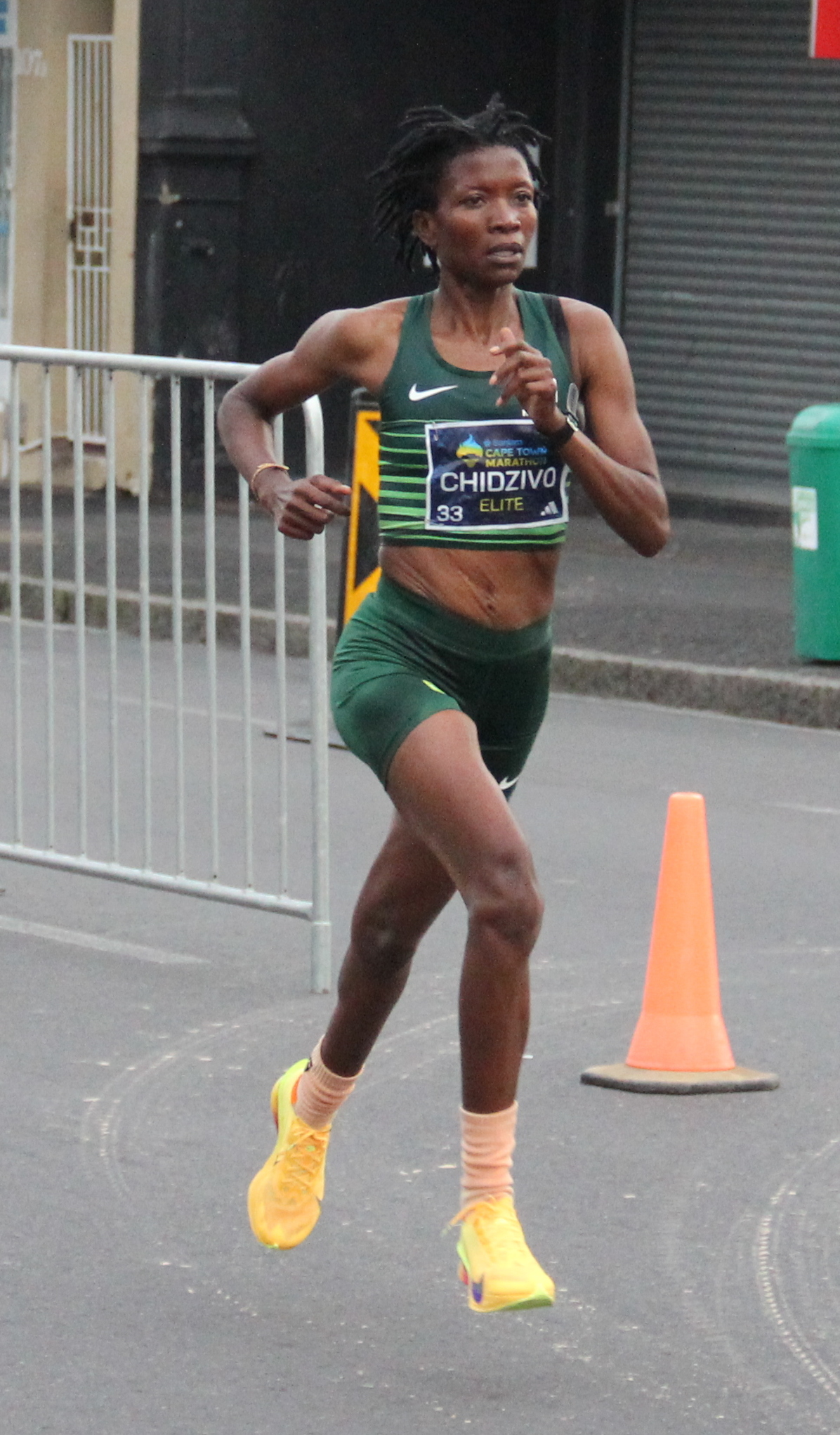
- 2026 Cape Town Marathon

Personal information
- Nationality: Zimbabwean
- Born: 16 March 1987 (age 39)
- Height: 155 cm (5 ft 1 in)
- Weight: 55 kg (121 lb)

Sport
- Sport: Long-distance running
- Event: Marathon

Fortunate Chidzivo (born 16 March 1987) is a Zimbabwean long distance runner. She competed in the women's marathon at the 2017 World Championships in Athletics.

In 2019, she represented Zimbabwe at the 2019 African Games held in Rabat, Morocco. She competed in the women's half marathon and she finished in 6th place with a time of 1:13:47. In 2020, she competed in the women's half marathon at the 2020 World Athletics Half Marathon Championships held in Gdynia, Poland, where she improved her national record.
