= Cheikh Tidiane Diouf =

Senegalese athlete (born 1995)

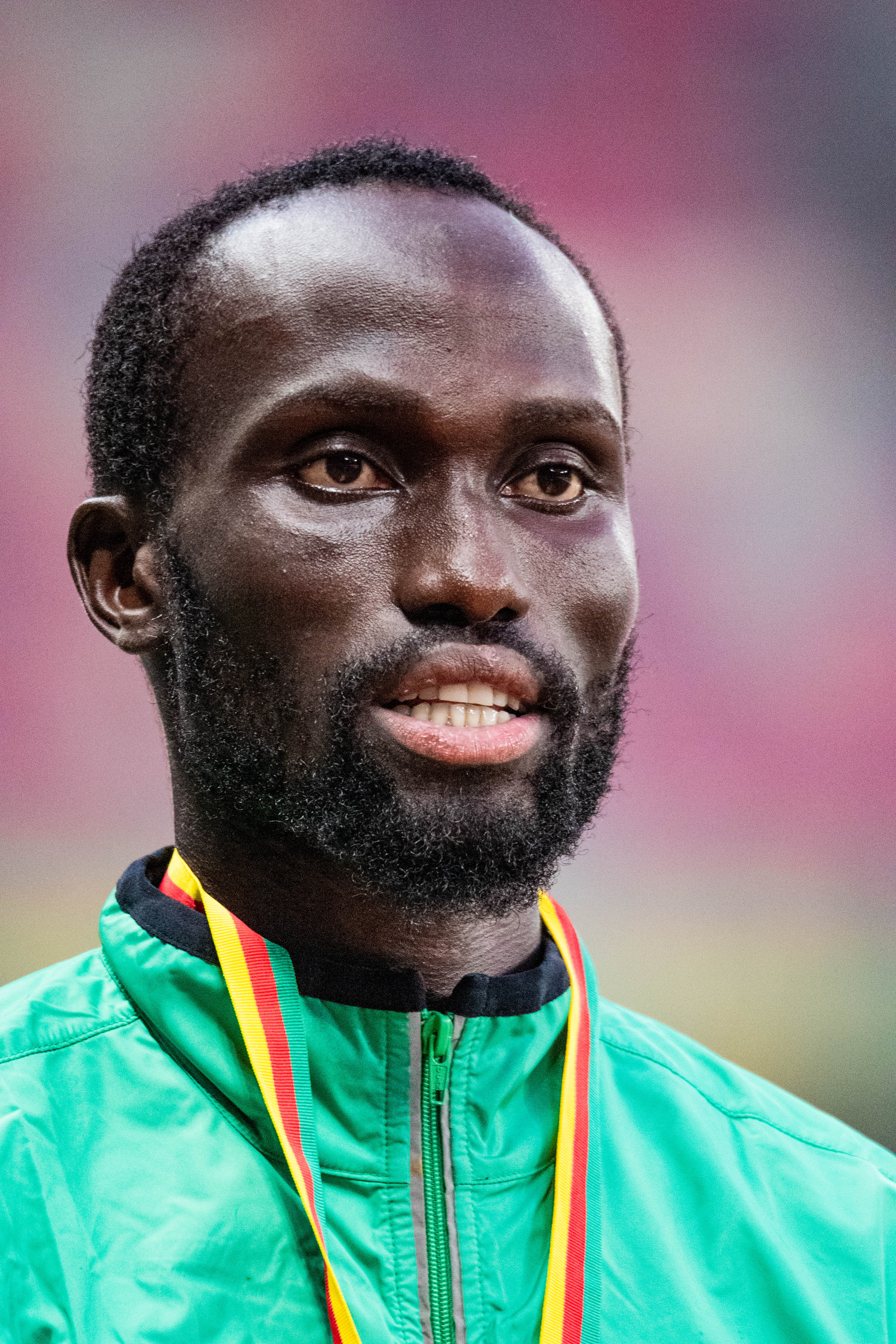
- Diouf in 2024

Personal information
- Nationality: Senegalese
- Born: 25 March 1995 (age 31)

Sport
- Sport: Athletics
- Event: Sprint

Achievements and titles
- Personal bests: 400m: 44.94 (Paris, 2024)
Medal record
Men's athletics
Representing Senegal
2023 African Games
Bronze medal – third place	2023 Accra	400 m
African Championships
Gold medal – first place	2024 Douala	400 m
Jeux de la Francophonie
Gold medal – first place	2023 Kinshasa	400m

Cheikh Tidiane Diouf (born 23 March 1995) is a Senegalese sprinter.

== Biography ==
He won gold at the Athletics at the 2023 Jeux de la Francophonie in Kinshasa in August 2023. He was a bronze medalist in the 400 metres at the Athletics at the 2023 African Games in Accra, Ghana.

He competed for Senegal at the 2024 World Athletics Relays in Nassau, Bahamas in May 2024. He won the 400m at the 2024 African Championships in Athletics in Douala, Cameroon in June 2024. He competed at the 2024 Summer Olympics over 400 metres in August 2024, where he ran a national record 44.94 seconds in the semi-final.

He competed at the 2025 World Athletics Relays in China in the Men's 4 × 400 metres relay in May 2025.

In May 2026, he ran at the 2026 World Athletics Relays in the men's 4 × 400 metres relay in Gaborone, Botswana.
