= Gerren Muwishi =

Zimbabwean sprinter

Personal information
- Born: 19 March 1994 (age 32)

Sport
- Sport: Athletics
- Event: Sprint
Medal record
Men's athletics
Representing Zimbabwe
African Championships
| Gold medal – first place | 2026 Accra | 4x400 m relay |

Gerren Muwishi (born 19 March 1994) is a Zimbabwean sprinter.

== Biography ==
Muwishi represented Zimbabwe at the delayed 2023 Africa Games held in Accra, Ghana, in March 2024. He was part of the Zimbabwe men's relay team which placed sixth in the final of both the men's 4 x 100 metres relay and men's 4 x 400 metres relay.

In March 2026, he was part of the Zimbabwe men's 4 x 400 metres relay team alongside Thandazani Ndhlovu, Leeford Zuze and Dennis Hove which set a new national record of 3:00.69 at the Lefika International Relays held at the Gaborone National Stadium breaking the long-standing previous national record which had stood for 29 years since 1997. He subsequently competed for Zimbabwe at the 2026 World Athletics Relays in Gaborone, Botswana. Competing in the men's 4 x 400 metres relay alongside Ndhlovu, Zuze, and Hove, helping the team to 2:59.01 and a new national record on 2 May 2026, finishing third in their heat to qualify the team for the final with the sixth fastest time overall, and also qualify for the 2027 World Championships. In the final, the quartet placed fifth overall with a time of 2:59.79. Later that month, he ran for Zimbabwe at the 2026 African Championships in Athletics in Accra, Ghana, winning the gold medal on the final day of the championships in the men's 4 x 400 metres relay.
