= Dennis Hove =

Zimbabwean sprinter (born 2002)

Personal information
- Full name: Dennis Bradley Hove
- Born: 6 January 2002 (age 24)

Sport
- Sport: Athletics
- Event: Sprint

Achievements and titles
- Personal best(s): 200m: 20.69 (2026); 400m: 44.86 (2026)
Medal record
Men's athletics
Representing Zimbabwe
African Championships
Gold medal – first place	2026 Accra	4x400 m relay
Silver medal – second place	2026 Accra	400 m

Dennis Bradley Hove (born 6 January 2002) is a Zimbabwean sprinter. He was the silver medalist over 400 metres at the 2026 African Championships in Athletics.

== Biography ==
A member of Yadah Athletics Club, Hove made his international debut competing for Zimbabwe at the 2024 African Championships in Athletics in Douala, Cameroon, where he was a semi-finalist in the 400 metres.

In March 2026, he was part of the Zimbabwe men's 4 x 400 metres relay team alongside Thandazani Ndhlovu, Leeford Zuze and Gerren Muwishi which set a new national record of 3:00.69 at the Lefika International Relays held at the Gaborone National Stadium breaking the long-standing previous national record which had stood for 29 years since 1997. He placed third over 400 metres at the Botswana Golden Grand Prix in April 2026, running 45.00 seconds to place behind Letsile Tebogo and Leeford Zuze.

Hove competed for Zimbabwe at the 2026 World Athletics Relays in Gaborone, Botswana. Competing in the men's 4 x 400 metres relay alongside Ndhlovu, Zuze, and Muwishi, helping the team to 2:59.01 and a new national record on 2 May 2026, finishing third in their heat to qualify the team for the final with the sixth fastest time overall, and also qualify for the 2027 World Championships. In the final, the quartet placed fifth overall with a time of 2:59.79. Later that month, he ran a personal best 44.86 seconds for the 400 metres while competing in the preliminary round for Zimbabwe at the 2026 African Championships in Athletics in Accra, Ghana, before winning the silver medal in the final behind Lee Eppie of Botswana. He also won the gold medal on the final day of the championships in the men’s 4 x 400 metres relay.
