= George Mutinda =

Kenyan sprinter (born 2001)

Personal information
- Full name: George Mutinda Mutuku
- Nationality: Kenyan
- Born: 10 October 2001 (age 24)

Sport
- Sport: Athletics
- Event: Sprint

Achievements and titles
- Personal best: 400m: 44.51 (2025)

George Mutinda Mutuku (born 10 October 2001) is a Kenyan sprinter. In 2025, he won the Kenyan Athletics Championships over 400 metres.

== Biography ==
A member of the Kenyan Police, he was a late adopter of athletics, having had a prior focus on basketball. He is coached by Salvan Mwangire.

In June 2025, he ran a personal best of 44.51 seconds to win the men's 400 metres at the Kenyan Athletics Championships, a time that was under the World Championship qualifying standard in the event, and saw him finish ahead of Kenyan international runners Brian Tinega and Kevin Kipkorir who both ran at the 2025 World Athletics Relays the previous month.

He had been selected to represent Kenya at the World University Games in Germany in 2025 but decided to forego his place in order to compete at the Kenyan World Championships Trials. In July 2025, he was subsequently named alongside Tinega and Kipkorir in the Kenyan team for the 2025 World Athletics Championships in Tokyo, Japan, running in the heats of the men's 400 metres without advancing to the semi-finals. He also ran at the championships in the men's 4 x 400 metres relay.

Competing at the 2026 World Athletics Relays in Botswana, he was part of the Kenya mixed 4 x 400 metres relay team which set an African record of 3:09.87 on the opening day. He was selected as part of the Kenyan team for the 2026 Commonwealth Games in Glasgow, Scotland.

== Personal life ==
His is from Masaii in Machakos County. He studied criminology at the University of Embu.
