= Kelvin Tonui =

Kenyan sprinter

Personal information
- Full name: Kelvin Kiprotich Tonui
- Born: 26 July 1997 (age 29)

Sport
- Sport: Athletics
- Event: Sprint

Achievements and titles
- Personal bests: 400m: 44.95 s (Nairobi, 2026)

Kelvin Kiprotich Tonui (born 26 July 1997) is a Kenyan sprinter who primarily competes over 400 metres. He was part of the Kenyan men's 4 x 400 metres relay team which set a new a national record while competing at the 2025 World Athletics Relays.

== Biography ==
In June 2024, Tonui ran 45.73 seconds for the 400 metres in the heats before placing fifth in the final of the Kenyan Olympic Trails. The following year, he represented Kenya at the 2025 World Athletics Relays in China in the men's 4 × 400 metres relay in May 2025 as the Kenyan team placed fifth in a national record time of 2:59.29, running alongside Zablon Ekwam, Boniface Mweresa and Kevin Kipkorir. He ran 45.58 seconds to place third at the national 400 metres race at the Kip Keino Classic on 1 June 2025. He was named in the Kenyan team for the 2025 World Athletics Championships in Tokyo, Japan.

In April 2026, he was the first Kenyan finisher in 45.43 seconds in the 400 metres at the Kenyan Trials. Later that month, he ran a personal best 44.95 seconds to finish third in the 400 metres at the Kip Keino Classic in Nairobi behind Zakithi Nene and Muzala Samukonga. He was named in the Kenyan team for the 2026 World Athletics Relays in Gaborone, Botswana. On the opening day, he was part of the Kenya mixed 4 x 400 metres relay team which set an African record of 3:09.87. The following month, he won the 400 m title at the Kenyan Championships in 44.77. In July 2026, he was a semi-finalist in the 400 metres at the 2026 Commonwealth Games in Glasgow, Scotland. He also competed in the mixed 4 × 400 m relay at the Games.
