= Boniface Mweresa =

Kenyan sprinter

Personal information
- Full name: Boniface Ontuga Mweresa
- Born: 13 November 1993 (age 32) Nyamira, Kenya
- Height: 1.74 m (5 ft 9 in)
- Weight: 74 kg (163 lb)

Sport
- Sport: Athletics
- Event: 400 m
Medal record
Men's athletics
Representing Kenya
All-Africa Games
Gold medal – first place	2015 Brazzaville	4x400 m
Silver medal – second place	2015 Brazzaville	400 m
African Championships
Silver medal – second place	2016 Durban	4×400 m

Boniface Ontuga Mweresa (born 13 November 1993 in Nyamira) is a Kenyan sprinter specialising in the 400 metres. He competed in the 4 × 400 m relay at the 2012 Summer Olympics. His personal bests in the event are 44.96 seconds outdoors (Birmingham 2022) and 46.33 seconds indoors (Portland 2016). He is a Commonwealth bronze medalist in the 4 × 400 m relay at the 2022 Commonwealth Games.

== Competition record ==
Year	Competition	Venue	Position	Event	Notes
Representing Kenya
2012	World Junior Championships	Barcelona, Spain	7th	400 m	46.50
2012	Olympic Games	London, United Kingdom	–	4 × 400 m relay	DQ
2015	IAAF World Relays	Nassau, Bahamas	12th (h)	4 × 400 m relay	3:05.92
2015	African Games	Brazzaville, Republic of the Congo	2nd	400 m	45.01
2015	African Games	Brazzaville, Republic of the Congo	1st	4 × 400 m relay	3:00.34
2016	World Indoor Championships	Portland, United States	5th	400 m	46.86
2016	African Championships	Durban, South Africa	2nd	4 × 400 m relay	3:04.25
2017	IAAF World Relays	Nassau, Bahamas	1st (B)	4 × 400 m relay	3:06.36
2017	World Championships	London, United Kingdom	22nd (sf)	400 m	45.93
2018	Commonwealth Games	Gold Coast, Australia	16th (sf)	400 m	46.68
2018	Commonwealth Games	Gold Coast, Australia	6th (h)	4 × 400 m relay	3:13.52^{1}
2024	World Indoor Championships	Glasgow, United Kingdom	4th	4 × 400 m relay	3:06.71
2024	African Championships	Douala, Cameroon	4th	400 m	45.62
2025	World Relays	Guangzhou, China	5th	4 × 400 m relay	2:59.29
2025	World Championships	Tokyo, Japan	12th (h)	4 × 100 m relay	38.56
2026	Commonwealth Games	Glasgow, United Kingdom	13th (sf)	400 m	46.24

^{1}Disqualified in the final
