= 2022 African Championships in Athletics – Men's 400 metres =

The men's 400 metres event at the 2022 African Championships in Athletics was held on 8, 9 and 10 June in Port Louis, Mauritius.

== Medalists ==
Gold	Silver	Bronze
Muzala Samukonga; Zambia	Bayapo Ndori; Botswana	Mohamed Fares Jlassi; Tunisia

== Results ==
=== Heats ===
Qualification: First 3 of each heat (Q) and the next 3 fastest (q) qualified for the semifinals.

Rank	Heat	Name	Nationality	Time	Notes
1	1	Bayapo Ndori	Botswana	45.31	Q
2	1	Muzala Samukonga	Zambia	45.48	Q
3	7	Zibane Ngozi	Botswana	46.45	Q
4	5	Mahmad Alexander Bock	Namibia	46.49	Q
5	2	Mohamed Fares Jlassi	Tunisia	46.52	Q
6	7	Zakhiti Nene	South Africa	46.58	Q
7	7	Cheikh Tidiane Diouf	Senegal	46.67	Q
8	4	Patrick Kakozi Nyambe	Zambia	46.68	Q
9	5	Sikiru Adeyemi	Nigeria	46.73	Q
10	6	Leungo Scotch	Botswana	46.74	Q
11	4	Frédéric Mendy	Senegal	46.78	Q
12	4	William Seewua	Kenya	46.80	Q
13	2	Kennedy Luchembe	Zambia	46.93	Q
14	4	Samson Nathaniel	Nigeria	47.01	q
15	6	Gardeo Isaacs	South Africa	47.10	Q
16	6	Haron Adoli	Uganda	47.11	Q
17	3	Tumisang Shezi	South Africa	47.20	Q
18	6	Andre Johannes Retief	Namibia	47.25	q
19	6	Johnson Nnamani	Nigeria	47.37	q
20	2	Yobsan Biru	Ethiopia	47.55	Q
21	5	Collins Gichana	Kenya	47.60	Q
22	4	Rami Balti	Tunisia	47.73	
23	4	Edmond Hounthon	Benin	47.75	
24	3	Ivan Danny Geldenhuys	Namibia	47.86	Q
25	3	Fabrisio Saïdy	Réunion	47.90	Q
26	7	Tony Sylva	Gambia	47.95	
27	1	El-Mir Reale	Réunion	47.98	Q
28	1	El Hadji Malick Soumaré	Senegal	48.15	
29	7	Simon Artwell	Zimbabwe	48.36	
30	2	Duncan Agyemang	Ghana	48.50	
31	2	Semi Thiel	South Sudan	48.57	
32	3	Sebastien Clarice	Mauritius	48.87	
33	2	Sylvain Benandro	Madagascar	49.01	
34	1	Patrice Remandro	Madagascar	49.03	
35	7	Godfrey Chan-Wengo	Uganda	49.30	
36	4	Yohanes Tefera	Ethiopia	49.48	
37	5	Illa Salifou Chaibou	Niger	49.71	
38	6	Modou Lamin Bah	Gambia	49.80	
39	4	Ahmed Essabai	Libya	52.63	
	1	Emmanuel Korir	Kenya	DNS	
	1	Awad Elkarim Koko	Sudan	DNS	
	1	Benedictor Mathias	Tanzania	DNS	
	2	Akeem Sirleaf	Liberia	DNS	
	2	Gerren Muwishi	Zimbabwe	DNF	
	3	Gilles Anthony Afoumba	Republic of the Congo	DNS	
	3	Caleb Vadivello	Seychelles	DNS	
	3	Anthony Pesela	Botswana	DNS	
	5	Aboubakar Sidick Tetndap Nsangou	Cameroon	DNS	
	5	Todisoa Franck Rabearison	Madagascar	DNS	
	5	Daniel Otibo	Ghana	DNS	
	6	Corneille Junior Ayingouka	Central African Republic	DNS	

=== Semifinals ===
Qualification: First 2 of each semifinal (Q) and the next 2 fastest (q) qualified for the final.

Rank	Heat	Name	Nationality	Time	Notes
1	2	Mohamed Fares Jlassi	Tunisia	46.40	Q
2	3	Bayapo Ndori	Botswana	46.48	Q
3	2	Muzala Samukonga	Zambia	46.49	Q
4	1	Leungo Scotch	Botswana	46.66	Q
5	3	Mahmad Alexander Bock	Namibia	46.72	Q
6	3	Kennedy Luchembe	Zambia	46.74	q
7	1	Zakhiti Nene	South Africa	46.92	Q
8	2	Zibane Ngozi	Botswana	47.08	q
9	3	Collins Gichana	Kenya	47.14	
10	2	Frédéric Mendy	Senegal	47.33	
11	1	Patrick Kakozi Nyambe	Zambia	47.63	
12	2	Samson Nathaniel	Nigeria	47.66	
13	3	Gardeo Isaacs	South Africa	47.69	
14	2	Haron Adoli	Uganda	47.91	
15	3	Yobsan Biru	Ethiopia	47.96	
16	3	Johnson Nnamani	Nigeria	48.21	
17	1	Sikiru Adeyemi	Nigeria	48.22	
18	2	Ivan Danny Geldenhuys	Namibia	48.24	
19	1	Andre Johannes Retief	Namibia	48.38	
20	2	Fabrisio Saïdy	Réunion	48.46	
21	1	William Seewua	Kenya	48.81	
22	1	El-Mir Reale	Réunion	50.07	
	3	Tumisang Shezi	South Africa	DNF	
	1	Cheikh Tidiane Diouf	Senegal	DNS	

=== Final ===
Rank	Lane	Athlete	Nationality	Time	Notes
1st place, gold medalist(s)	5	Muzala Samukonga	Zambia	45.31	
2nd place, silver medalist(s)	6	Bayapo Ndori	Botswana	45.35	
3rd place, bronze medalist(s)	3	Mohamed Fares Jlassi	Tunisia	45.54	45.333
4	8	Zakhiti Nene	South Africa	45.54	45.540
5	4	Leungo Scotch	Botswana	46.14	
6	2	Kennedy Luchembe	Zambia	46.16	
7	1	Zibane Ngozi	Botswana	46.57	
8	7	Mahmad Alexander Bock	Namibia	46.75	
