= 2024 African Championships in Athletics – Men's 4 × 400 metres relay =

Men's 4 × 400 metres relay at the 2024 African Championships in Athletics
- Venue: Japoma Stadium
- Location: Douala, Cameroon
- Dates: 26 June
- Nations: 8
- Winning time: 3:02.23

Medalists
gold medal	Omphile Seribe; Collen Kebinatshipi; Boitumelo Masilo; Leungo Scotch	Botswana
silver medal	Kevin Kipkorir; Kelvin Sane Tauta; David Sanayek Kapirante; Brian Onyari Tinega	Kenya
bronze medal	Kennedy Luchembe; Patrick Nyambe; David Mulenga; Muzala Samukonga	Zambia

The men's 4 × 400 metres relay event at the 2024 African Championships in Athletics was held on 26 June in Douala, Cameroon.

== Results ==
Rank	Lane	Nation	Competitors	Time	Notes
1st place, gold medalist(s)	5	Botswana	Omphile Seribe, Collen Kebinatshipi, Boitumelo Masilo, Leungo Scotch	3:02.23	
2nd place, silver medalist(s)	7	Kenya	Kevin Kipkorir, Kelvin Sane Tauta, David Sanayek Kapirante, Brian Onyari Tinega	3:02.34	
3rd place, bronze medalist(s)	2	Zambia	Kennedy Luchembe, Patrick Nyambe, David Mulenga, Muzala Samukonga	3:02.56	
4	8	Nigeria	Emmanuel Ifeanyi Ojeli, Dubem Amene, Sikiru Adeyemi, Chidi Okezie	3:02.93	
5	3	Senegal	El Hadji Malick Soumare, Abdou Lakhat Ndiaye, Frederick Mendy, Abdou Aziz Ndiaye	3:08.14	
6	1	Namibia	Alexander Bock, Elton Hoeseb, Ivan Geldenhuys, Elvis Gaseb	3:08.69	
7	4	Ethiopia	Melkamu Assefa, Yohannes Getaneh, Yohannes Tefera, Abera Alemu	3:16.32	
8	6	Cameroon	Evouna Kong, Abdras Nkembe, Martial Prime Etoa, Evariste Nana Kuate	3:16.45	

== See also ==
- Athletics at the 2023 African Games – Men's 4 × 400 metres relay
