= 2022 African Championships in Athletics – Men's 4 × 400 metres relay =

Relay running competition

The men's 4 × 400 metres relay event at the 2022 African Championships in Athletics was held on 11 and 12 June in Port Louis, Mauritius.

== Medalists ==
| Gold | Silver | Bronze |
|---|---|---|
| Botswana; Busang Collen Kebinatshipi; Leungo Scotch; Anthony Pesela; Bayapo Ndori; Maitseo Keitumetse* | Zambia; Muzala Samukonga; Kennedy Luchembe; Patrick Kakozi Nyambe; David Mulenga | Nigeria; Johnson Nnamani; Chidi Okezie; Sikiru Adeyemi; Emmanuel Ojeli; Ayo Adeola* |

*Athletes who competed in heats only

== Results ==
=== Heats ===
Qualification: First 3 teams of each heat (Q) plus the next 2 fastest (q) qualified for the final.

| Rank | Heat | Nation | Athletes | Time | Notes |
|---|---|---|---|---|---|
| 1 | 2 | Zambia | Kennedy Luchembe, David Mulenga, Patrick Kakozi Nyambe, Muzala Samukonga | 3:06.28 | Q |
| 2 | 2 | South Africa | Sabelo Dhlamini, Zakhiti Nene, Johannes Pretorius, Gardeo Isaacs | 3:08.23 | Q |
| 3 | 1 | Botswana | Zibane Ngozi, Leungo Scotch, Maitseo Keitumetse, Bayapo Ndori | 3:09.25 | Q |
| 4 | 2 | Tunisia | Rami Balti, Abdessalem Ayouni, Mohamed Amine Touati, Mohamed Fares Jlassi | 3:09.46 | Q |
| 5 | 2 | Senegal | Frédéric Mendy, Fallou Gaye, Joseph Amicha Coulibaly, El Hadji Malick Soumaré | 3:10.20 | q |
| 6 | 2 | Kenya | Isaac Kirwa, Mike Nyang'au, William Mutunga, William Rayian | 3:10.54 | q |
| 7 | 2 | Namibia | Andre Johannes Retief, Ivan Geldenhuys, Ernst Narib, Warren Goreseb | 3:10.70 | |
| 8 | 1 | Nigeria | Johnson Nnamani, Sikiru Adeyemi, Ayo Adeola, Emmanuel Ojeli | 3:12.24 | Q |
| 9 | 1 | Gambia | Modou Sanneh, Modou Lamin Bah, Edrissa Marong, Tony Sylva | 3:14.99 | Q |
| 10 | 1 | Ethiopia | Yobsan Biru, Tolesa Bodena, Yohannes Tefera, Melkamu Assefa | 3:16.86 | |
| 11 | 1 | Mauritius | Hans Goodorally, Yohan Murden, Yash Aubeeluck, Sébastien Clarice | 3:16.94 | |
| | 1 | Réunion | | DNS | |

=== Final ===
| Rank | Lane | Nation | Competitors | Time | Notes |
|---|---|---|---|---|---|
| 1st place, gold medalist(s) | 3 | Botswana | Busang Collen Kebinatshipi, Leungo Scotch, Anthony Pesela, Bayapo Ndori | 3:04.27 | |
| 2nd place, silver medalist(s) | 4 | Zambia | Muzala Samukonga, Kennedy Luchembe, Patrick Kakozi Nyambe, David Mulenga | 3:05.53 | |
| 3rd place, bronze medalist(s) | 5 | Nigeria | Johnson Nnamani, Chidi Okezie, Sikiru Adeyemi, Emmanuel Ojeli | 3:07.05 | |
| 4 | 1 | Kenya | Mike Nyang'au, Wiseman Mukhobe, William Mutunga, William Rayian | 3:09.49 | |
| 5 | 8 | Tunisia | Rami Balti, Abdessalem Ayouni, Mohamed Amine Touati, Mohamed Fares Jlassi | 3:11.31 | |
| 6 | 2 | Senegal | Joseph Amicha Coulibaly, El Hadji Malick Soumaré, Frédéric Mendy, Fallou Gaye | 3:13.57 | |
| 7 | 6 | South Africa | Sabelo Dhlamini, Gardeo Isaacs, Kabelo Mohlosi, Leroux Hamman | 3:14.69 | |
| 8 | 7 | Gambia | Modou Sanneh, Tony Sylva, Edrissa Marong, Modou Lamin Bah | 3:16.96 | |
