= Athletics at the 2024 Summer Olympics – Men's 4 × 400 metres relay =

Men's 4 × 400 metres relay at the Games of the XXXIII Olympiad
- Venue: Stade de France, Paris, France
- Dates: 9 August 2024 (round 1); 10 August 2024 (final)
- Winning time: 2:54.43 OR

Medalists
| 1st place, gold medalist(s) | | Christopher Bailey, Vernon Norwood, Bryce Deadmon, Rai Benjamin, Quincy Wilson* | United States |
| 2nd place, silver medalist(s) | | Bayapo Ndori, Busang Kebinatshipi, Anthony Pesela, Letsile Tebogo | Botswana |
| 3rd place, bronze medalist(s) | | Alex Haydock-Wilson, Matthew Hudson-Smith, Lewis Davey, Charlie Dobson, Samuel Reardon*, Toby Harries* *Indicates the athlete only competed in the preliminary heats. | Great Britain |

The men's 4 × 400 metres relay at the 2024 Summer Olympics was held in two rounds at the Stade de France in Paris, France, on 9 and 10 August 2024. This was the 26th time that the men's 4 × 400 metres relay was contested at the Summer Olympics. A total of 16 teams were able to qualify for the event through the 2024 World Athletics Relays or the World Athletics top list.

== Summary ==
A great deal of social media enthusiasm was generated when 16-year-old, high school junior Quincy Wilson finished 6th at the US Trials, entitling him to be on the US relay squad. After the trials, he improved to run the second-fastest American time of the year, setting the world U18 record three times during the season. He was the first leg of the team in Heat 1. Also on that leg was Botswana's 200m gold medalist Letsile Tebogo who blasted a 44.4 leg to tear the race apart at the start. The public relations boon turned into a liability as Wilson ran credibly for the first 300 metres but tied up on the last 100 metres to run a 47.3 leg, putting the US team at a big deficit in 7th place, in danger of not qualifying for the final. He handed off to veteran Vernon Norwood, twice Wilson's age who ran a 43.6 to bring USA past Poland into 6th place. Bryce Deadmon ran a 44.2 leg to get past Zambia and Germany into 4th place. Christopher Bailey had to run all out for most of the anchor lap, only having the opportunity to relax once he had clearly passed Kentaro Sato of Japan to secure the third automatic qualifying position for the team behind Botswana and GBR. Bailey split 44.0, so all three runners who would run in the final the next day had hard splits in their legs. Ultimately, Japan and Zambia were able to qualify on time, but nobody knew that would happen until the second heat concluded. More drama happened in the second heat when Lythe Pillay tripped taking South Africa out of the final. The referees put them back in, making 9 starters for the final.

Teams are allowed to change the order and substitute fresh runners for the final. USA's gold medalist Quincy Hall was injured and unable to be used, so the only USA addition was 400 hurdle gold medalist Rai Benjamin. Belgium also lost the services of their World Indoor Champion Alexander Doom due to injury. They were able to substitute with 36-year-old veteran, 2010 European Champion Kevin Borlée. Botswana has exhibited high level talent since Rio, but made technical mistakes that shouldn't happen in high level races. This year, mistakes are not evident and they are planning for a winning strategy using their star Tebogo strategically in the heats and putting him on anchor in the final.

In the final, with big 3 turn stagger gaps between the athletes at the start, Bayapo Ndori blasted BOT out to a big lead in the first 300 of the race, catching GBR's Alex Haydock-Wilson who had already passed Muhammad Abdallah Kounta of France on his outside. Over the last 100 metres, the early leaders slowed while Kounta, Bailey (USA) and Jonathan Sacoor (BEL) closed strongly, Botswana handing off to Busang Kebinatshipi slightly ahead of USA to Norwood, Belgium to Dylan Borlée slightly ahead of GBR to their star Matthew Hudson-Smith even with France to Gilles Biron. By the time the athletes merged, Kebinatshipi had 3 metres on Hudson-Smith, Norwood another 2 metres back with 2 more metres on Borlée. Over the rest of the leg, Hudson-Smith closed down on Kebinatshipi while Norwood passed Hudson-Smith at the handoff to Deadmon. Botswana passed to Anthony Pesela in the lead, but Deadmon quickly ran around him on the turn, opening up a 4 metre lead midway down the backstretch, while GBR's Lewis Davey pulled even with Pesela. Deadmon maintained the gap as Davey passed Pesela at the start of the turn. That was temporary, coming off the turn, Pesela passed him back and went on a charge after Deadmon while Davey faded into the distance. Pesela closed the lead down to 3 metres when he handed off to Tebogo. Could the strong hurdler, Benjamin, hold off one of the fastest men in the world running twice his normal distance? Benjamin set it in cruise mode, seemingly holding a little back for the onslaught. Through the turn, Tebogo began to close down the lead, but only slightly. Coming onto the straightaway, Tebogo was into full sprint mode, pulling into lane 2 for room to pass. Tebogo looked like he might get there, closing down to less than a metre, but Benjamin held him off to the finish line.

The American team improved upon the Olympic Record of USA at the 2008 Olympics. Botswana set the African Record, Great Britain set the European Record. Sixth place Japan set the Asian Record. Belgium and South Africa set National Records. Letsile Tebogo ran the second fastest split in history, 43.04. Beside him, Rai Benjamin's 43.18 was #7. On the second leg, Matthew Hudson-Smith's 43.09 was #5 chasing Vernon Norwood's 43.26, #10.

== Background ==
The men's 4 × 400 metres relay at the Summer Olympics has been present on the Olympic athletics programme since 1912.

Global records before the 2024 Summer Olympics
| Record | Athlete (Nation) | Time (s) | Location | Date |
|---|---|---|---|---|
| World record | United States (Andrew Valmon, Quincy Watts, Butch Reynolds, Michael Johnson) | 2:54.29 | Stuttgart, Germany | 22 August 1993 |
| Olympic record | United States (LaShawn Merritt, Angelo Taylor, David Neville, Jeremy Wariner) | 2:55.39 | Beijing, China | 23 August 2008 |
| World leading | Texas A&M (Jevon O'Bryant, Cutler Zamzow, Kimar Farquharson, Auhmad Robinson) | 2:58.37 | Eugene, United States | 7 June 2024 |

Area records before the 2024 Summer Olympics
| Area Record | Athlete (Nation) | Time (s) |
|---|---|---|
| Africa (records) | Botswana (Isaac Makwala, Baboloki Thebe, Zibane Ngozi, Bayapo Ndori) | 2:57.27 |
| Asia (records) | India (Muhammad Anas, Amoj Jacob, Muhammed Ajmal Variyathodi, Rajesh Ramesh) | 2:59.05 |
| Europe (records) | Great Britain (Iwan Thomas, Jamie Baulch, Mark Richardson, Roger Black) | 2:56.60 |
| North, Central America and Caribbean (records) | United States (Andrew Valmon, Quincy Watts, Butch Reynolds, Michael Johnson) | 2:54.29 WR |
| Oceania (records) | Australia (Bruce Frayne, Darren Clark, Gary Minihan, Rick Mitchell) | 2:59.70 |
| South America (records) | Brazil (Eronilde de Araújo, Anderson Jorge dos Santos, Claudinei da Silva, Sanderlei Parrela) | 2:58.56 |

== Qualification ==
| Qualification event | No. of teams | Qualified teams |
|---|---|---|
| 2024 World Athletics Relays | 14 | Belgium; Botswana; Brazil; Germany; Great Britain; India; Italy; Japan; Nigeria; Poland; South Africa; Spain; Trinidad and Tobago; United States |
| World Athletics Top List (as of June 30, 2024) | 2 | France; Zambia |
| Total | 16 | |

For the men's 4 × 400 metres relay event, fourteen teams qualified through the 2024 World Athletics Relays. The remaining two spots were awarded to the teams with the highest ranking on the World Athletics Top List. The qualification period is between 1 July 2023 and 30 June 2024.

== Results ==
=== Round 1 ===
Round 1 was held on 9 August, and started at 11:05 (UTC+2) in the morning.

==== Heat 1 ====
| Rank | Lane | Nation | Competitors | Reaction | Time | Notes |
|---|---|---|---|---|---|---|
| 1 | 6 | Botswana | Letsile Tebogo, Busang Kebinatshipi, Anthony Pesela, Bayapo Ndori | 0.165 | 2:57.76 | Q, SB |
| 2 | 8 | Great Britain | Samuel Reardon, Matthew Hudson-Smith, Toby Harries, Charlie Dobson | 0.228 | 2:58.88 | Q, SB |
| 3 | 4 | United States | Quincy Wilson, Vernon Norwood, Bryce Deadmon, Christopher Bailey | 0.166 | 2:59.15 | Q |
| 4 | 7 | Japan | Yuki Joseph Nakajima, Kaito Kawabata, Fuga Sato, Kentaro Sato | 0.199 | 2:59.48 | q, NR |
| 5 | 2 | Zambia | Patrick Kakozi Nyambe, Kennedy Luchembe, Chanda Mulenga, Muzala Samukonga | 0.190 | 3:00.08 | q |
| 6 | 5 | Germany | Jean Paul Bredau, Marc Koch, Manuel Sanders, Emil Agyekum | 0.153 | 3:00.29 | SB |
| 7 | 3 | Poland | Maksymilian Szwed, Karol Zalewski, Daniel Sołtysiak, Kajetan Duszyński | 0.163 | 3:01.21 | SB |
| 8 | 9 | Trinidad and Tobago | Renny Quow, Jereem Richards, Jaden Marchan, Shakeem McKay | 0.156 | 3:06.73 | |

==== Heat 2 ====
| Rank | Lane | Nation | Competitors | Reaction | Time | Notes |
|---|---|---|---|---|---|---|
| 1 | 3 | France | Muhammad Abdallah Kounta, Gilles Biron, Téo Andant, Fabrisio Saïdy | 0.156 | 2:59.53 | Q, SB |
| 2 | 7 | Belgium | Jonathan Sacoor, Dylan Borlée, Florent Mabille, Kevin Borlée | 0.143 | 2:59.84 | Q, =SB |
| 3 | 5 | Italy | Luca Sito, Vladimir Aceti, Alessandro Sibilio, Edoardo Scotti | 0.166 | 3:00.26 | Q, SB |
| 4 | 2 | India | Muhammed Anas Yahiya, Muhammad Ajmal Variyathodi, Amoj Jacob, Rajesh Ramesh | 0.158 | 3:00.58 | SB |
| 5 | 4 | Brazil | Lucas Carvalho, Lucas Vilar, Douglas Mendes, Matheus Lima | 0.141 | 3:00.95 | SB |
| 6 | 9 | Spain | Iñaki Cañal, Óscar Husillos, David García Zurita, Julio Arenas | 0.145 | 3:01.60 | |
| 7 | 6 | South Africa | Gardeo Isaacs, Zakithi Nene, Antonie Matthys Nortje, Lythe Pillay | 0.168 | 3:03.19 | qR |
| | 8 | Nigeria | Ifeanyi Emmanuel Ojeli, Ezekiel Nathaniel, Dubem Amene, Chidi Okezie | 0.152 | DQ | TR17.2.3 |

=== Final ===
The final was held on 10 August, and started at 21:12 (UTC+2) in the evening.

| Rank | Lane | Nation | Competitors | Reaction | Time | Notes |
|---|---|---|---|---|---|---|
| 1st place, gold medalist(s) | 4 | United States | Christopher Bailey, Vernon Norwood, Bryce Deadmon, Rai Benjamin | 0.144 | 2:54.43 | OR |
| 2nd place, silver medalist(s) | 6 | Botswana | Bayapo Ndori, Busang Kebinatshipi, Anthony Pesela, Letsile Tebogo | 0.159 | 2:54.53 | AR |
| 3rd place, bronze medalist(s) | 7 | Great Britain | Alex Haydock-Wilson, Matthew Hudson-Smith, Lewis Davey, Charlie Dobson | 0.150 | 2:55.83 | AR |
| 4 | 5 | Belgium | Jonathan Sacoor, Dylan Borlée, Kevin Borlée, Florent Mabille | 0.152 | 2:57.75 | NR |
| 5 | 1 | South Africa | Gardeo Isaacs, Zakithi Nene, Lythe Pillay, Antonie Matthys Nortje | 0.156 | 2:58.12 | NR |
| 6 | 2 | Japan | Yuki Joseph Nakajima, Kaito Kawabata, Fuga Sato, Kentaro Sato | 0.204 | 2:58.33 | AR |
| 7 | 9 | Italy | Luca Sito, Vladimir Aceti, Edoardo Scotti, Alessandro Sibilio | 0.152 | 2:59.72 | SB |
| 8 | 3 | Zambia | Patrick Kakozi Nyambe, Kennedy Luchembe, Chanda Mulenga, Muzala Samukonga | 0.186 | 3:02.76 | |
| 9 | 8 | France | Muhammad Abdallah Kounta, Gilles Biron, Téo Andant, Fabrisio Saïdy | 0.156 | 3:07.30 | |
