= 2024 World Athletics Relays – Men's 4 × 400 metres relay =

Men's 4 × 400 metres relay at the 2024 World Athletics Relays
- Venue: Thomas Robinson Stadium, Nassau, Bahamas
- Dates: 4 May (heats) & 5 May (repechage, final)

Medalists
gold medal	Busang Kebinatshipi, Letsile Tebogo, Leungo Scotch, Bayapo Ndori	Botswana
silver medal	Gardeo Isaacs, Zakithi Nene, Antonie Nortje, Lythe Pillay	South Africa
bronze medal	Dylan Borlée, Robin Vanderbemden, Alexander Doom, Jonathan Sacoor	Belgium

The men's 4 × 400 metres relay at the 2024 World Athletics Relays has been held at the Thomas Robinson Stadium on 4 and 5 May.

== Records ==
Prior to the competition, the records were as follows:

World record	United States (Andrew Valmon, Quincy Watts, Butch Reynolds, Michael Johnson)	2:54.29	Stuttgart, Germany	22 August 1993
Championships record	United States (David Verburg, Tony McQuay, Christian Taylor, LaShawn Merritt)	2:57.25	(The Bahamas) Nassau, Bahamas	25 May 2014
World Leading	Zambia; Patrick Kakozi Nyambe, Kennedy Luchembe, David Mulenga, Muzala Samukonga	2:59.12	Accra, Ghana	22 March 2024

== Program ==
- Heats: Saturday 4 May 2024, 21:51
- Repechage: Sunday 5 May 2024, 21:08
- Final: Sunday 5 May 2024, 22:20

== Results ==
KEY:	Q	Qualified	q	Qualified as fastest times	WL	World leading	NR	National record	SB	Seasonal best	OG	2024 Olympic Games qualification

=== Heats ===
The top two per heat earned automatic Olympic qualification and advancement to the finals. All other teams had a second chance at Olympic qualification in the repechage round the following day.

Men's 4x400 Metres Relay Olympic Qualifying Round 1 - Heat
Place	Athlete	Country	Time	Heat
1	Isaac Makwala; Letsile Tebogo; Leungo Scotch; Bayapo Ndori	Botswana	2:59.73	4
2	Gardeo Isaacs; Zakithi Nene; Wayde van Niekerk; Lythe Pillay	South Africa	2:59.76	4
3	Dylan Borlée; Robin Vanderbemden; Jonathan Sacoor; Alexander Doom	Belgium	3:00.09	2
4	Kentaro Sato; Yudai Nishi; Fuga Sato; Kaito Kawabata	Japan	3:00.98	1
5	Manuel Sanders; Jean Paul Bredau; Marc Koch; Emil Agyekum	Germany	3:01.25	1
6	Luca Sito; Vladimir Aceti; Edoardo Scotti; Davide Re	Italy	3:01.68	3
7	Dubem Nwachukwu; Dubem Amene; Sikiru Adeyemi; Chidi Okezie	Nigeria	3:01.70	2
8	Matthew Hudson-Smith; Toby Harries; Lee Thompson; Lewis Davey	Great Britain	3:02.10	3
9	Malik James-King; Zandrion Barnes; Assinie Wilson; Demish Gaye	Jamaica	3:02.46	2
10	Ammar Ibrahim; Abubaker Haydar Abdalla; Ashrat Hussen Osman; Ismail Doudai Abakar	Qatar	3:02.55	3
11	Edgar Ramírez Ríos; Luis Avilés; Guillermo Campos; Valente Mendoza	Mexico	3:02.87	2
12	Eugene Omalla; Terrence Agard; Ramsey Angela; Liemarvin Bonevacia	Netherlands	3:03.02	3
13	Wiseman Mukhobe; Boniface Mweresa; Brian Onyari Tinega; David Sanayek Kapirante	Kenya	3:03.29	3
14	Kyle Gale; Rasheeme Griffith; Raheem Taitt-Best; Jonathan Jones	Barbados	3:03.72	4
15	Luke van Ratingen; Alex Beck; Thomas Reynolds; Harrison Hunt	Australia	3:03.81	4
16	Lucas Carvalho; Matheus Lima; Vitor Hugo de Miranda; Lucas Vilar	Brazil	3:03.97	2
17	Asa Guevara; Timothy Frederick; Shakeem Mc Kay; Jereem Richards	Trinidad and Tobago	3:04.15	1
18	Patrick Kakozi Nyambe; Sitali Kakene; David Mulenga; Muzala Samukonga	Zambia	3:05.00	1
19	Jalon White; Marco Arop; Christopher Morales Williams; Myles Misener-Daley	Canada	3:05.02	1
20	Igor Bogaczyński; Patryk Grzegorzewicz; Mateusz Rzeźniczak; Kajetan Duszyński	Poland	3:05.91	1
21	İlyas Çanakçı; İsmail Nezir; Yasmani Copello; Berke Akçam	Turkey	3:06.74	2
22	Iñaki Cañal; Lucas Búa; Manuel Guijarro; Bernat Erta	Spain	3:06.84	4
23	Matěj Krsek; Jan Tesař; Michal Desenský; Pavel Maslák	Czech Republic	3:06.86	2
24	Wendell Miller; Alonzo Russell; Zion Shepherd; Shakeem Hall-Smith	Bahamas	3:07.45	3
25	Wilber Encarnacion; Erick Joel Sánchez; Ismael Antonio Adon; Juander Santos	Dominican Republic	3:08.15	4
26	Frédéric Mendy; El Hadji Malick Soumaré; Ousmane Sidibé; Cheikh Tidiane Diouf	Senegal	3:09.09	3
27	Daniel Williams; Malachi Austin; Arinze Chance; Simeon Adams	Guyana	3:09.91	2
28	Javier Gómez; Ryan López; Julio Rodríguez; José Antonio Maita	Venezuela	3:09.91	3
	Jacory Patterson; Christopher Bailey; Champion Allison; Bryce Deadmon	United States	DQ (Note: Disqualified for lining up to receive the baton in the wrong order, as Champion Allison moved ahead of Marc Koch at the second exchange zone despite officials placing Allison on the outside of Koch. The U.S. won the heat with splits of 45.55 / 44.66 / 44.98 / 45.23, but their time was voided soon after.)	1
	Muhammed Anas; Rajesh Ramesh; Muhammad Ajmal Variyathodi; Amoj Jacob	India	DNF	4
	David Sombé; Thomas Jordier; Gilles Biron; Téo Andant	France	DNF	4

=== Repechage Olympic qualifying round ===
The repechage round consisted of all countries which did not qualify for the finals. The top two countries in each repechage heat qualified for the 2024 Olympics, however there was no path for the repechage teams to qualify for the World Relays finals later in the day.

Men's 4x400 Metres Relay Olympic Qualifying Round 2 - Heat
Place	Athlete	Country	Time	Heat
1	Jacory Patterson; Champion Allison; Christopher Bailey; Bryce Deadmon	United States	2:59.95	1
2	Lucas Carvalho; Lucas Vilar; Vitor Hugo de Miranda; Matheus Lima	Brazil	3:01.86	3
3	Iñaki Cañal; Manuel Guijarro; Óscar Husillos; Julio Arenas	Spain	3:02.39	2
4	Asa Guevara; Jereem Richards; Che Lara; Shakeem Mc Kay	Trinidad and Tobago	3:02.39	3
5	David Sombé; Gilles Biron; Ludovic Oucéni; Téo Andant	France	3:02.44	3
6	Maks Szwed; Mateusz Rzeźniczak; Igor Bogaczyński; Kajetan Duszyński	Poland	3:02.91	2
7	Matěj Krsek; Vít Müller; Michal Desenský; Patrik Šorm	Czech Republic	3:03.00	2
8	Patrick Kakozi Nyambe; Muzala Samukonga; David Mulenga; Kennedy Luchembe	Zambia	3:03.18	2
9	Muhammed Anas; Muhammad Ajmal Variyathodi; Arokia Rajiv; Amoj Jacob	India	3:03.23	1
10	Eugene Omalla; Terrence Agard; Ramsey Angela; Liemarvin Bonevacia	Netherlands	3:03.24	3
11	Myles Misener-Daley; Marco Arop; Ibrahim Ayorinde; Jalon White	Canada	3:03.29	3
12	Edgar Ramírez Ríos; Luis Avilés; Guillermo Campos; Valente Mendoza	Mexico	3:03.47	1
13	Luke van Ratingen; Alex Beck; Cooper Sherman; Harrison Hunt	Australia	3:04.68	3
14	Wiseman Mukhobe; Boniface Mweresa; David Sanayek Kapirante; Kennedy Kimeu Muthoki	Kenya	3:04.83	1
15	Rusheen McDonald; Malik James-King; Demish Gaye; Assinie Wilson	Jamaica	3:05.09	2
16	Kubilay Ençü; Yasmani Copello; Berke Akçam; İsmail Nezir	Turkey	3:06.35	3
17	Kyle Gale; Jonathan Jones; Raheem Taitt-Best; Rasheeme Griffith	Barbados	3:06.54	2
18	Wendell Miller; Alonzo Russell; Zion Miller; Shakeem Hall-Smith	Bahamas	3:08.29	1
19	Ousmane Sidibé; El Hadji Malick Soumaré; Frédéric Mendy; Cheikh Tidiane Diouf	Senegal	3:09.00	2
20	Daniel Williams; Patrick Abel; Malachi Austin; Simeon Adams	Guyana	3:10.01	2
21	Javier Gómez; Ryan López; Julio Rodríguez; José Antonio Maita	Venezuela	3:10.34	3
	Ammar Ibrahim; Abubaker Haydar Abdalla; Ashrat Hussen Osman; Ismail Doudai Abakar	Qatar	DNF	1
		Dominican Republic	DNS	1

=== Final ===
- Results
- Start list
- Race Analysis

Men's 4x400 Metres Relay
Place	Athlete	Country	Time
1st place, gold medalist(s)	Busang Kebinatshipi; Letsile Tebogo; Leungo Scotch; Bayapo Ndori	Botswana	2:59.11
2nd place, silver medalist(s)	Gardeo Isaacs; Zakithi Nene; Antonie Nortje; Lythe Pillay	South Africa	3:00.75
3rd place, bronze medalist(s)	Dylan Borlée; Robin Vanderbemden; Alexander Doom; Jonathan Sacoor	Belgium	3:01.16
4	Kentaro Sato; Fuga Sato; Yuki Joseph Nakajima; Kaito Kawabata	Japan	3:01.20
5	Luca Sito; Vladimir Aceti; Edoardo Scotti; Davide Re	Italy	3:01.60
6	Matthew Hudson-Smith; Alex Haydock-Wilson; Joe Brier; Lewis Davey	Great Britain	3:02.62
7	Jean Paul Bredau; Tyrel Prenz; Marc Koch; Manuel Sanders	Germany	3:05.55
8	Dubem Nwachukwu; Dubem Amene; Sikiru Adeyemi; Chidi Okezie	Nigeria	3:16.68
