= Athletics at the 2022 Commonwealth Games – Men's 4 × 400 metres relay =

Men's 4 × 400 metres relay at the 2022 Commonwealth Games
- Venue: Alexander Stadium
- Dates: 5 August (Round 1); 7 August (Final)
- Competitors: 45 from 10 nations
- Winning Time: 3:01.29

Medalists
gold medal	Dwight St. Hillaire; Asa Guevara; Machel Cedenio; Jereem Richards; Kashief King; Che Lara	Trinidad and Tobago
silver medal	Leungo Scotch; Zibane Ngozi; Anthony Pesela; Bayapo Ndori; Keitumese Maitseo	Botswana
bronze medal	Wiseman Mukhobe; Mike Nyang'au; William Rayian; Boniface Mweresa; William Mutunga	Kenya

The men's 4 × 400 metres relayat the 2022 Commonwealth Games, is part of the athletics programme, which took place in the Alexander Stadium on 5 and 7 August 2022.

== Records ==
Prior to this competition, the existing world and Games records were as follows:

World record	United States (Andrew Valmon, Quincy Watts, Butch Reynolds, Michael Johnson)	2:54.29	Stuttgart, Germany	22 August 1993
Commonwealth record	Great Britain (Iwan Thomas, Jamie Baulch, Mark Richardson, Roger Black)	2:56.60	Atlanta, United States	3 August 1996
Games record	Jamaica (Michael McDonald, Roxbert Martin, Greg Haughton, Davian Clarke)	2:59.03	Kuala Lumpur, Malaysia	21 September 1998

== Schedule ==
The schedule was as follows:

Date	Time	Round
Friday 7 August 2022	11:37	Round 1
Sunday 7 August 2022	20:30	Final

All times are British Summer Time (UTC+1)

== Results ==
=== Round 1 ===
The first three in each heat (Q) and the next two fastest (q) qualified for the final.

==== Heat 1 ====
Rank	Lane	Nation	Athletes	Reaction Time	Time	Notes
1	7	Botswana	Leungo Scotch, Keitumese Maitseo, Anthony Pesela, Bayapo Ndori	0.178	3:05.11	Q
2	5	Jamaica	Karayme Bartley, Anthony Cox, Navasky Anderson, Javon Francis	0.169	3:05.20	Q
3	6	Zambia	Patrick Nyambe, Kennedy Luchembe, David Mulenga, Muzala Samukonga	0.182	3:06.02	Q
4	4	Nigeria	Johnson Nnamani, Samson Oghenewegba Nathaniel, Ezekiel Nathaniel, Sikiru Adeyemi	0.187	3:06.36	q
5	8	Singapore	Tan Zong Yang, Calvin Quek, Thiruben Thana Rajan, Reuben Rainer Lee	0.150	3:15.01	
	3	Papua New Guinea			DNS	

==== Heat 2 ====
Rank	Lane	Nation	Athletes	Reaction Time	Time	Notes
1	4	Kenya	Wiseman Mukhobe, William Rayian, William Mutunga, Boniface Mweresa	0.196	3:06.76	Q, SB
2	6	India	Muhammed Anas, Noah Nirmal Tom, Muhammed Ajmal Variyathodi, Amoj Jacob	0.172	3:06.97	Q
3	5	Trinidad and Tobago	Dwight St. Hillaire, Che Lara, Machel Cedenio, Kashief King	0.177	3:07.12	Q
4	3	Barbados	Rasheeme Griffith, Jonathan Jones, Miguel Nicholas, Kyle Gale	0.226	3:07.23	q
5	7	Turks and Caicos Islands	Angelo Garland, Ifeanyichukwu Otuonye, Wilkinson Fenelon, Ken Reyes	0.182	3:22.53	SB

=== Final ===
The medals were determined in the final.

Rank	Lane	Nation	Athletes	Reaction Time	Time	Notes
1st place, gold medalist(s)	8	Trinidad and Tobago	Dwight St. Hillaire, Asa Guevara, Machel Cedenio, Jereem Richards	0.163	3:01.29	
2nd place, silver medalist(s)	4	Botswana	Leungo Scotch, Zibane Ngozi, Anthony Pesela, Bayapo Ndori	0.186	3:01.85	
3rd place, bronze medalist(s)	5	Kenya	Wiseman Mukhobe, Mike Nyang'au, William Rayian, Boniface Mweresa	0.187	3:02.41	SB
4	2	Barbados	Miguel Nicholas, Jonathan Jones, Rasheeme Griffith, Kyle Gale	0.179	3:03.92	SB
5	9	Zambia	Patrick Nyambe, Kennedy Luchembe, David Mulenga, Muzala Samukonga	0.209	3:04.76	NR
6	7	India	Muhammed Anas, Muhammed Ajmal Variyathodi, Naganathan Pandi, Amoj Jacob	0.169	3:05.51	
7	3	Nigeria	Johnson Nnamani, Samson Oghenewegba Nathaniel, Ifeanyi Emmanuel Ojeli, Sikiru Adeyemi	0.182	3:06.06	
	6	Jamaica	Karayme Bartley, Nathon Allen, Javon Francis, Anthony Cox		DQ	
