= Athletics at the 2023 African Games – Men's 400 metres =

Men's 400 metres at the 2023 African Games
- Venue: Legon Sports Stadium
- Location: Accra, Ghana
- Dates: 18 March (heats); 19 March (semi-finals); 20 March (final)
- Competitors: 42 from 22 nations
- Winning time: 45.06

Medalists
gold medal	Chidi Okezie	Nigeria
silver medal	Muzala Samukonga	Zambia
bronze medal	Cheikh Tidiane Diouf	Senegal

The men's 400 metres event at the 2023 African Games was held on 18, 19 and 20 March 2024 in Accra, Ghana.

== Results ==
=== Heats ===
Held on 18 March
Qualification: First 3 in each heat (Q) and the next 6 fastest (q) advanced to the semifinals.

Rank	Heat	Name	Nationality	Time	Notes
1	5	Cheikh Tidiane Diouf	Senegal	45.64	Q
2	2	Chidi Okezie	Nigeria	45.89	Q
3	6	Muzala Samukonga	Zambia	46.11	Q
4	6	Hamza Dair	Morocco	46.11	Q
5	2	David Sanayek	Kenya	46.18	Q
6	4	Aaron Adoli	Uganda	46.21	Q
7	1	Gerren Muwishi	Zimbabwe	46.23	Q
8	4	Dubem Nwachukwu	Nigeria	46.29	Q
9	3	Kenneddy Kimeu	Kenya	46.30	Q
10	5	Ernest Kumevu	Botswana	46.41	Q
11	6	Gilles Anthony Afoumba	Republic of the Congo	46.43	Q
12	6	Omphile Seribe	Botswana	46.45	q
13	1	Boitumelo Masilo	Botswana	46.46	Q
14	3	El Hadji Malick Soumare	Senegal	46.48	Q
15	4	Kennedy Luchembe	Zambia	46.60	Q
16	6	Tumisang Shezi	South Africa	46.68	q
17	1	Sikiru Adeyemi	Nigeria	46.72	Q
18	5	Biruk Tadesse	Ethiopia	46.84	Q
19	2	Abdou Aziz N'diaye	Senegal	47.05	Q
20	1	Andre Retief	Namibia	47.21	q
21	3	Zuze Leeford	Zimbabwe	47.29	Q
22	5	Rachid Mhamdi	Morocco	47.35	q
23	4	Ivan Geldenhuys	Namibia	47.56	q
24	1	Abdennour Bendjemaa	Algeria	47.59	q
25	1	Amara Conte	Guinea	47.65	
26	2	Caleb Vadivello	Seychelles	47.66	
27	2	Anas Es Saddik Hammouni	Algeria	47.69	
28	2	Dux Lutahezi	Namibia	47.70	
29	5	Martin Owusu-Antwi	Ghana	47.72	
30	3	Solomon Diafo	Ghana	47.85	
31	4	Melkamu Assefa	Ethiopia	48.06	
32	1	Godwin Hounthon	Benin	48.20	
33	3	Yohannes Kiflemariam	Eritrea	48.24	NR
34	3	Fouad Hamada	Algeria	48.37	
35	6	Derek Kargbo	Sierra Leone	48.52	
36	6	Abate Addisu	Ethiopia	48.68	
37	5	Simon Atwell	Zimbabwe	48.91	
38	3	Yash Aubeeluck	Mauritius	49.16	
39	2	Esmael Freitas	São Tomé and Príncipe	49.26	
40	5	Nabine Tabiou	Togo	49.44	
41	3	Abu Bakarr Sesay	Sierra Leone	49.91	
42	4	Neil Azemia	Seychelles	50.81	
	4	Frank Addo	Ghana	DNS	

=== Semifinals ===
Held on 19 March
Qualification: First 2 in each semifinal (Q) and the next 2 fastest (q) advanced to the final.

Rank	Heat	Name	Nationality	Time	Notes
1	3	Muzala Samukonga	Zambia	45.51	Q
2	2	Cheikh Tidiane Diouf	Senegal	45.59	Q
3	1	Chidi Okezie	Nigeria	45.63	Q
4	1	Boitumelo Masilo	Botswana	45.87	Q
5	3	Ernest Kumevu	Botswana	45.89	Q
5	3	Dubem Nwachukwu	Nigeria	45.89	Q
7	3	Aaron Adoli	Uganda	45.95	q
8	1	Gerren Muwishi	Zimbabwe	46.16	
9	2	Gilles Anthony Afoumba	Republic of the Congo	46.17	Q
10	2	Kenneddy Kimeu	Kenya	46.39	
11	1	Tumisang Shezi	South Africa	46.40	
12	1	David Sanayek	Kenya	46.48	
13	2	Hamza Dair	Morocco	46.66	
14	3	Biruk Tadesse	Ethiopia	46.77	
15	3	Rachid Mhamdi	Morocco	46.84	
16	1	Abdou Aziz N'diaye	Senegal	47.13	
17	2	Zuze Leeford	Zimbabwe	47.25	
18	2	Omphile Seribe	Botswana	47.28	
19	2	Abdennour Bendjemaa	Algeria	47.48	
20	1	Ivan Geldenhuys	Namibia	48.01	
21	3	Andre Retief	Namibia	48.09	
22	2	El Hadji Malick Soumare	Senegal	50.13	
	1	Kennedy Luchembe	Zambia	DNF	
	3	Sikiru Adeyemi	Nigeria	DNF	

=== Final ===
Held on 20 March

Rank	Lane	Name	Nationality	Time	Notes
1st place, gold medalist(s)	3	Chidi Okezie	Nigeria	45.06	
2nd place, silver medalist(s)	5	Muzala Samukonga	Zambia	45.37	
3rd place, bronze medalist(s)	6	Cheikh Tidiane Diouf	Senegal	45.49	
4	4	Boitumelo Masilo	Botswana	45.81	
5	8	Ernest Kumevu	Botswana	46.09	
6	1	Aaron Adoli	Uganda	46.16	
7	2	Gilles Anthony Afoumba	Republic of the Congo	46.65	
8	7	Dubem Nwachukwu	Nigeria	47.13	
