= 2024 African Championships in Athletics – Mixed 4 × 400 metres relay =

Mixed 4 × 400 metres relay at the 2024 African Championships in Athletics
- Venue: Japoma Stadium
- Location: Douala, Cameroon
- Dates: 22 June
- Nations: 8
- Winning time: 3:13.12 CR, NR

Medalists
| gold medal | Gardeo Isaacs; Shirley Nekhubui; Mthi Mthimkulu; Miranda Coetzee | South Africa |
| silver medal | Emmanuel Ifeanyi Ojeli; Ella Onojuvwewo; Dubem Nwachukwu; Patience George | Nigeria |
| bronze medal | Leungo Scotch; Obakeng Kamberuka; Bayapo Ndori; Galefele Moroko | Botswana |

The mixed 4 × 400 metres relay event at the 2024 African Championships in Athletics was held on 22 June in Douala, Cameroon.

== Results ==
| Rank | Lane | Nation | Competitors | Time | Notes |
|---|---|---|---|---|---|
| 1st place, gold medalist(s) | 1 | South Africa | Gardeo Isaacs, Shirley Nekhubui, Mthi Mthimkulu, Miranda Coetzee | 3:13.12 | CR, NR |
| 2nd place, silver medalist(s) | 4 | Nigeria | Emmanuel Ifeanyi Ojeli, Ella Onojuvwewo, Dubem Nwachukwu, Patience George | 3:13.72 | |
| 3rd place, bronze medalist(s) | 7 | Botswana | Leungo Scotch, Obakeng Kamberuka, Bayapo Ndori, Galefele Moroko | 3:15.93 | |
| 4 | 6 | Kenya | Ekwom Zablon, David Sanayek Kapirante, Veronica Mutua, Mercy Chebet | 3:16.59 | |
| 5 | 2 | Senegal | Khoury Diagne, Abdou Aziz Ndiaye, Fatou Gaye, Frédéric Mendy | 3:24.41 | |
| 6 | 8 | Namibia | Alexander Bock, Napuumue Hengari, Ezra Nakale, Tuuliki Angala | 3:28.90 | NR |
| 7 | 5 | Cameroon | Ibrahima Hamayadji, Linda Angounou, Evariste Nana Kuate, Marcelline Nkengue Ambombo | 3:30.95 | |
| 8 | 3 | Ethiopia | Hana Tadesse, Melkamu Assefa, Yonas Rezene, Banchiayehu Tesema | 3:32.49 | |

== See also ==
- Athletics at the 2023 African Games – Mixed 4 × 400 metres relay
