= Athletics at the 2023 African Games – Men's 4 × 400 metres relay =

The men's 4 × 400 metres relay event at the 2023 African Games was held on 21 and 22 March 2024 in Accra, Ghana.

== Medalists ==
Gold	Silver	Bronze
Zambia; Patrick Nyambe; Kennedy Luchembe; David Mulenga; Muzala Samukonga	Botswana; Busang Kebinatshipi; Leungo Scotch; Boitumelo Masilo; Bayapo Ndori; Omphile Seribe*	Nigeria; Ifeanyi Emmanuel Ojeli; Samson Oghenewegba Nathaniel; Sikiru Adeyemi; Chidi Okezie; Dubem Nwachukwu*

*Athletes who competed in heats only

== Results ==
=== Heats ===
Qualification: First 3 teams of each heat (Q) plus the next 2 fastest (q) qualified for the final.

Rank	Heat	Nation	Athletes	Time	Notes
1	2	Zambia	Patrick Nyambe, Kennedy Luchembe, David Mulenga, Muzala Samukonga	3:04.16	Q, NR
2	1	Botswana	Omphile Seribe, Busang Kebinatshipi, Bayapo Ndori, Leungo Scotch	3:05.44	Q
3	2	Nigeria	Dubem Nwachukwu, Emmanuel Ifeanyi Ojeli, Samson Nathaniel, Sikiru Adeyemi	3:06.48	Q
4	1	Kenya	Wiseman Mukhobe, Ngeno Kipngetich, Kenneddy Kimeu, David Sanayek	3:07.14	Q
5	2	Senegal	Abdou Lakhat Ndiaye, El Hadji Malick Soumare, Ousmane Sidibé, Abdou Aziz Ndiaye	3:07.23	Q
6	1	Algeria	Anas Es Saddik Hammouni, Fouad Hamada, Dhiae Boudoumi, Abdennour Bendjemaa	3:07.97	Q
7	2	Zimbabwe	Busani Ndlovu, Zuze Leeford, Simon Atwell, Gerren Muwishi	3:09.05	q
8	1	Ethiopia	Derese Tesfaye, Biruk Tadesse, Abate Addisu, Yohannes Tefera	3:14.28	q
9	2	Sierra Leone	Derek Kargbo, Abu Bakarr Sesay, Kalie Sesay, Lawrence Feidel	3:22.93	
	1	Morocco		DNS	

=== Final ===
Rank	Lane	Nation	Athletes	Time	Notes
1st place, gold medalist(s)	5	Zambia	Patrick Nyambe, Kennedy Luchembe, David Mulenga, Muzala Samukonga	2:59.12	WL, GR, NR
2nd place, silver medalist(s)	4	Botswana	Busang Kebinatshipi, Leungo Scotch, Boitumelo Masilo, Bayapo Ndori	2:59.32	
3rd place, bronze medalist(s)	3	Nigeria	Emmanuel Ifeanyi Ojeli, Samson Nathaniel, Sikiru Adeyemi, Chidi Okezie	3:01.84	
4	7	Senegal	Abdou Lakhat Ndiaye, El Hadji Malick Soumare, Abdou Aziz Ndiaye, Cheikh Tidiane Diouf	3:02.68	
5	6	Kenya	Wiseman Mukhobe, David Sanayek, Ngeno Kipngetich, Kenneddy Kimeu	3:03.90	
6	8	Zimbabwe	Busani Ndlovu, Zuze Leeford, Simon Atwell, Gerren Muwishi	3:06.08	
7	2	Algeria	Anas Es Saddik Hammouni, Fouad Hamada, Dhiae Boudoumi, Abdennour Bendjemaa	3:08.08	
8	1	Ethiopia	Melkamu Assefa, Derese Tesfaye, Yohannes Tefera, Mintesnot Wachso	3:29.77	
