= Athletics at the 2023 African Games – Mixed 4 × 400 metres relay =

The mixed 4 × 400 metres relay event at the 2023 African Games was held on 18 and 19 March 2024 in Accra, Ghana. It was the first time that this event was contested at the African Games. The fixed order for all teams was man–woman–man–woman.

== Medalists ==
Gold	Silver	Bronze
Nigeria; Ifeanyi Emmanuel Ojeli; Patience Okon George; Sikiru Adeyemi; Omolara Ogunmakinju; Samson Oghenewegba Nathaniel*	Botswana; Busang Kebinatshipi; Lydia Jele; Bayapo Ndori; Obakeng Kamberuka; Leungo Scotch*	Kenya; David Sanayek; Maureen Thomas; Kennedy Kimeu; Mary Moraa

*Athletes who competed in heats only

== Results ==
=== Heats ===
Qualification: First 3 teams of each heat (Q) plus the next 2 fastest (q) qualified for the final.

Rank	Heat	Nation	Athletes	Time	Notes
1	2	Botswana	Leungo Scotch, Lydia Jele, Bayapo Ndori, Obakeng Kamberuka	3:14.36	Q, NR
2	1	Nigeria	Ifeanyi Emmanuel Ojeli, Patience Okon George, Samson Nathaniel, Omolara Ogunmakinju	3:15.23	Q
3	2	Kenya	David Sanayek, Maureen Thomas, Kennedy Kimeu, Mary Moraa	3:18.42	Q
4	2	South Africa	Anele Nzwanzwa, Rogail Joseph, Lindokuhle Gora, Shirley Nekhubui	3:19.63	Q
5	1	Ghana	Solomon Diafo, Grace Aduntira, Daniel Otibo, Bridget Annan	3:23.87	Q, NR
6	1	Ethiopia	Biruk Tadesse, Hana Tadesse, Melkamu Assefa, Msgana Haylu	3:26.51	Q
7	1	Sierra Leone	Kalie Sesay, Marie Bangura, Derek Kargbo, Georgiana Sesay	3:26.51	q
8	2	Namibia	Dux Lutahezi, Napuumue Hengari, Enock Kawiwi, Erin Koff	3:37.19	q
	1	Zambia	Patrick Nyambe, Abigail Sepiso, David Mulenga, Niddy Mingilishi	DQ	TR24.19
	2	Uganda		DNS	

=== Final ===
Rank	Lane	Nation	Athletes	Time	Notes
1st place, gold medalist(s)	6	Nigeria	Ifeanyi Emmanuel Ojeli, Patience Okon George, Sikiru Adeyemi, Omolara Ogunmakinju	3:13.26	AR
2nd place, silver medalist(s)	5	Botswana	Busang Kebinatshipi, Lydia Jele, Bayapo Ndori, Obakeng Kamberuka	3:13.99	NR
3rd place, bronze medalist(s)	3	Kenya	David Sanayek, Maureen Thomas, Kennedy Kimeu, Mary Moraa	3:18.03	
4	7	South Africa	Anele Nzwanzwa, Rogail Joseph, Tumisang Shezi, Shirley Nekhubui	3:18.54	NR
5	4	Ghana	Solomon Diafo, Grace Aduntira, Daniel Otibo, Bridget Annan	3:23.36	NR
6	1	Sierra Leone	Mohamed Basiru Bah, Marie Bangura, Derek Kargbo, Georgiana Sesay	3:24.79	NR
7	2	Ethiopia	Melkamu Assefa, Hana Tadesse, Biruk Tadesse, Msgana Haylu	3:25.55	
8	8	Namibia	Andre Retief, Napuumue Hengari, Dawid Dam, Tuuliki Angala	3:30.00	NR
