= 2022 African Championships in Athletics – Men's 400 metres hurdles =

The men's 400 metres hurdles event at the 2022 African Championships in Athletics was held on 10 and 12 June in Port Louis, Mauritius.

== Medalists ==
Gold	Silver	Bronze
Sokwakhana Zazini; South Africa	Abdelmalik Lahoulou; Algeria	Wiseman Mukhobe; Kenya

== Results ==
=== Heats ===
Qualification: First 2 of each heat (Q) and the next 2 fastest (q) qualified for the final.

Rank	Heat	Name	Nationality	Time	Notes
1	2	Wiseman Mukhobe	Kenya	49.87	Q
2	1	Sokwakhana Zazini	South Africa	50.44	Q
3	1	Bienvenu Sawadogo	Burkina Faso	50.92	Q
4	2	Abdelmalik Lahoulou	Algeria	51.03	Q
5	1	William Mutunga	Kenya	51.06	q
6	3	Leroux Hamman	South Africa	51.23	Q
7	3	Ismail Manyani	Morocco	51.49	Q
8	1	Victor Ntweng	Botswana	51.52	q
9	3	Mohamed Amine Touati	Tunisia	51.62	
10	2	Johannes Pretorius	South Africa	51.66	
11	2	Maitseo Keitumetse	Botswana	51.67	
12	3	Kemorena Tisang	Botswana	52.02	
13	2	Ousmane Sidibé	Senegal	53.16	
14	1	Fallou Gaye	Senegal	53.19	
15	3	Todisoa Franck Rabearison	Madagascar	53.28	
16	2	Jean Robert Bezara	Madagascar	53.30	
17	3	Yobsan Biru	Ethiopia	53.43	
18	3	Iréné Bado	Burkina Faso	53.92	
19	2	Andre Johannes Retief	Namibia	55.39	
20	2	Rilwan Alowonle	Nigeria	1:00.13	
	1	Jordin Andrade	Cape Verde	DNS	
	1	Timothy Emoghene	Nigeria	DNS	
	1	Saad Hinti	Morocco	DNS	

=== Final ===
Rank	Lane	Athlete	Nationality	Time	Notes
1st place, gold medalist(s)	6	Sokwakhana Zazini	South Africa	49.42	
2nd place, silver medalist(s)	7	Abdelmalik Lahoulou	Algeria	50.10	
3rd place, bronze medalist(s)	4	Wiseman Mukhobe	Kenya	50.48	
4	2	William Mutunga	Kenya	51.13	
5	6	Leroux Hamman	South Africa	51.68	
6	4	Bienvenu Sawadogo	Burkina Faso	51.71	
7	2	Victor Ntweng	Botswana	51.77	
8	8	Ismail Manyani	Morocco	52.71	
