= Angola at the 2024 African Championships in Athletics =

- Flag of Angola
- WA code: ANG

in Douala, Cameroon 21 June 2024 – 26 June 2024
- Competitors: 6 (3 men and 3 women)
- Medals: Gold 0 Silver 0 Bronze 0 Total 0

Angola competed at the 2024 African Championships in Athletics in Douala, Cameroon, from 21 to 26 June 2024.

== Results ==
Angola entered 6 athletes.

=== Men ===
Track and road events

| Athlete | Event | Heat | | Semifinal | | Final | |
| Athlete | Event | Result | Rank | Result | Rank | Result | Rank |
|---|---|---|---|---|---|---|---|
| Marcos Santos | 200 metres | 23.84 | 3 | Did not advance | | | |
| Arão Simão | 200 metres | DNS | | Did not advance | | | |
| Antonio Teko | 5000 metres | —N/a | | | | 14:55.62 | 19 |

=== Women ===
Track and road events

| Athlete | Event | Heat | | Semifinal | | Final | |
| Athlete | Event | Result | Rank | Result | Rank | Result | Rank |
|---|---|---|---|---|---|---|---|
| Victória Cassinda | 100 metres | DNS | | Did not advance | | | |
| Victória Cassinda | 200 metres | DNS | | Did not advance | | | |
| Joana Heleca | 1500 metres | DNS | | —N/a | | Did not advance | |
| Carolina Yonengue | 100 metres hurdles | DNS | | —N/a | | Did not advance | |
| Carolina Yonengue | 400 metres hurdles | DNS | | —N/a | | Did not advance | |
