= Dwight St. Hillaire =

Trinidad and Tobago athlete

Personal information
- Born: 5 December 1997 (age 28) Belle Garden, Trinidad and Tobago

Sport
- Sport: Athletics
- Events: 200 metres; 400 metres
- University team: Kentucky Wildcats
Medal record
Men's athletics
Representing Trinidad and Tobago
Commonwealth Games
Gold medal – first place	2022 Birmingham	4 × 400 m relay
Pan American Games
Bronze medal – third place	2019 Lima	4 × 400 m relay

Dwight St. Hillaire (born 5 December 1997) is an Olympic sprinter from Trinidad and Tobago.

From Belle Garden, he achieved success whilst attending the University of Kentucky becoming an All-American, winning silver medals at the NCAA Championships and at the SEC Championships.

In 2018 he clocked a personal best of 44.55 seconds to move into the sixth spot on T&T's all-time men's 400 metres list. In March 2021 he ran a new lifetime best of 20.25 seconds in the 200 metres at an invitational meeting in South Carolina. In April 2021 he ran 44.74 in his first outdoor 400 metres race of the year which earned him at the time second spot on the 2021 world outdoor performance list, behind American Bryce Deadmon.

Whilst running in the Athletics at the 2020 Summer Olympics – Men's 400 metres he ran a time of 45.41 to qualify from the heats to the semi-finals. In the 4 × 400 m relay final St.Hillaire injured his hamstring but determinedly finished his leg of the race.

== Personal bests ==
Outdoor

- 100 metres – 10.33 (Knoxville 2018)
- 200 metres – 20.25 (Columbia 2021)
- 400 metres – 44.55 (Tampa 2018)

Indoor

- 60 metres – 6.76 (Lexington 2019)
- 200 metres – 20.73 (Clemson 2018)
- 400 metres – 45.64 (Clemson 2021)
- 1.803 metres — 2700 (Madison P 12/2020)
