= Botswana at the 2023 African Games =

- Flag of Botswana
- IOC code: BOT
- NOC: Botswana National Olympic Committee

in Accra, Ghana 8 March 2024 – 23 March 2024
- Competitors: 54 in 9 sports
- Medals Ranked 32nd: Gold 0 Silver 3 Bronze 10 Total 13

African Games appearances (overview)
- 1991; 1995; 1999; 2003; 2007; 2011; 2015; 2019; 2023

Botswana competed at the 2023 African Games held from 8 to 23 March 2024 in Accra, Ghana. Botswana competed in 9 sports.

== Medal table ==
Medal	Name	Sport	Event	Date
Silver	Busang Kebinatshipi; Obakeng Kamberuka; Bayapo Ndori; Lydia Jele; Leungo Scotch	Athletics	Mixed 4 × 400 metres relay	19 March
Silver	Victor Ntweng	Athletics	Men's 400 metress hurdles	21 March
Silver	Boitumelo Masilo; Busang Kebinatshipi; Bayapo Ndori; Leungo Scotch; Omphile Seribe	Athletics	Men's 4 × 400 metres relay	22 March
Bronze	Lethabo Sekano	Karate	Women's kumite −68 kg	7 March
Bronze	Lethabo Sekano; Amantle Leburu; Lesego Masimola	Karate	Women's kata team	8 March
Bronze	Adrian Robinson	Swimming	Men's 100 metre breaststroke	10 March
Bronze	Adrian Robinson	Swimming	Men's 50 metre breaststroke	12 March
Bronze	George Chiswaniso; Jack Sekao	Beach volleyball	Men's tournament	14 March
Bronze	Karabo Kula	Taekwondo	Women's −49 kg	19 March
Bronze	Tumo Nkape	Athletics	Men's 800 metres	20 March
Bronze	Kemorena Tisang	Athletics	Men's 400 metres hurdles	21 March
Bronze	Tlhomphang Basele; Obakeng Kamberuka; Lydia Jele; Oratile Nowe	Athletics	Women's 4 × 40 metres relay	22 March
Bronze	Keamogetse Kenosi	Boxing	Women's 57 kg	22 March
