= Antonie Nortje =

South African sprinter (born 2002)

Antonie Matthys Nortje
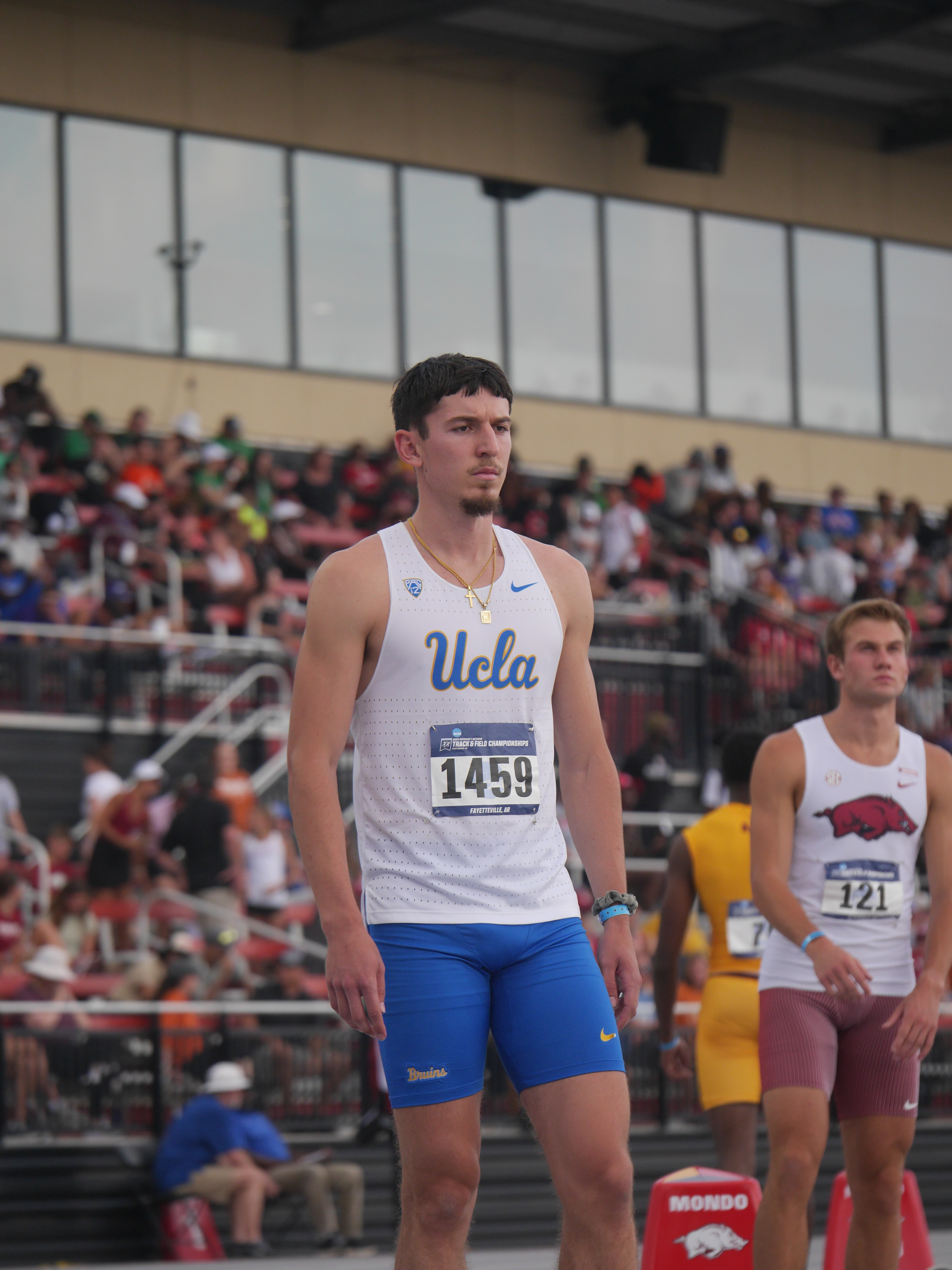

Personal information
- National team: South Africa
- Born: 2 February 2002 (age 24) South Africa
- Height: 192 cm (6 ft 4 in)
- Weight: 90 kg (198 lb)

Sport
- Country: South Africa
- Sport: Athletics
- Event: Sprint

Achievements and titles
- Personal bests: 200m: 20.67 (Boulder, 2024); 400m: 45.05 (Boulder, 2024)
Medal record
World Relays
Silver medal – second place	2024 Nassau	4×400 m relay
World U20 Championships
Bronze medal – third place	2021 Nairobi	400 m

Antonie Matthys Nortje (born 2 February 2002) is a South African sprinter who specializes in the 400 metres.

== Early life ==
Born in Pretoria, South Africa. He grew up in the small town of Bronkhorstspruit after which attending Hoërskool Garsfontein for his high school education, where he developed a passion for athletics. He was a member of Athletics - Gauteng North. He moved to the United States and attended University of Texas at Austin, University of California, Los Angeles and Texas A&M University.

== Career ==
He was the bronze medallist over 400 metres at the World Athletics U20 Championships in 2021 in Nairobi.

Nortje competed for the UCLA Bruins track and field and Texas A&M Aggies track and field teams in the NCAA.

At the final PAC-12 Championship, Antonie placed second overall, securing podium finishes in the 200m, 4×100m, and 4×400m events. His performance qualified him for the West Regionals, where he won both his Preliminary and Quarterfinal races, advancing to the 2024 NCAA Championships. At the NCAA Championships, Antonie earned All-American honors by placing third in his Semi-Final.

He ran as part of the South African 4x400m relay team at the 2024 World Relays Championships in Nassau, Bahamas. He ran the third leg in the final as the South African team won silver and guaranteed a place at the 2024 Paris Olympics.

In June 2024, he was selected for the South African team for the 2024 Paris Olympics where, as part of the 4×400m relay, he qualified for the final and placed 5th overall while setting a new National Record of 2:58:12.
