= Bayapo Ndori =

Motswana sprinter (born 1999)

Personal information
- Full name: Bayapo S. Ndori
- Born: 20 June 1999 (age 27) Tutume, Botswana
- Height: 177 cm (5 ft 10 in)
- Weight: 64 kg (141 lb)

Sport
- Sport: Athletics
- Event: 400 metres

Achievements and titles
- Personal best: 400 m: 44.10 (2024)
Medal record
Men's athletics
Representing Botswana
Olympic Games
| Silver medal – second place | 2024 Paris | 4 × 400 m relay |
| Bronze medal – third place | 2020 Tokyo | 4 × 400 m relay |
World Championships
| Gold medal – first place | 2025 Tokyo | 4 × 400 m relay |
| Bronze medal – third place | 2025 Tokyo | 400 m |
World Relays
| Gold medal – first place | 2024 Nassau | 4 × 400 m relay |
| Gold medal – first place | 2026 Gaborone | 4×400 m relay |
Commonwealth Games
| Silver medal – second place | 2022 Birmingham | 4 × 400 m relay |
African Games
| Silver medal – second place | 2023 Accra | 4 × 400 m relay |
| Silver medal – second place | 2023 Accra | Mixed 4 × 400 m relay |
African Championships
| Gold medal – first place | 2022 Saint Pierre | 4 × 400 m relay |
| Silver medal – second place | 2022 Saint Pierre | 400 m |
| Bronze medal – third place | 2024 Douala | Mixed 4 × 400 m relay |

Bayapo S. Ndori (born 20 June 1999) is a Motswana athlete. He competed in the men's 4 × 400 metres relay event at the 2020 Summer Olympics and won the bronze medal. Ndori won a silver medal in the same event at the 2024 Summer Olympics. He won the bronze medal at the men's 400-metre final of the 2025 World Athletics Championships in Tokyo, Japan.
