= Boitumelo Masilo =

Botswana middle-distance runner

Personal information
- Born: 5 August 1995 (age 30)

Sport
- Sport: Athletics
- Event: 800 metres
Medal record
Men's athletics
Representing Botswana
African Games
Silver medal – second place	2023 Accra	4 × 400 m relay
World Relays
Bronze medal – third place	2021 Chorzów	4×400 m relay
African Championships
Gold medal – first place	2024 Douala	4×400 m relay

Boitumelo Masilo (born 5 August 1995) is a middle-distance runner from Botswana competing primarily in the 800 metres. He represented his country at the 2016 Summer Olympics without advancing from the first round.

His personal best in the event is 1:45.74 set in Wageningen in 2022.

== International competitions ==
Year	Competition	Venue	Position	Event	Notes
Representing Botswana
2015	African Games	Brazzaville, Republic of the Congo	8th	800 m	1:52.35
2016	African Championships	Durban, South Africa	4th	800 m	1:46.16
2016	Olympic Games	Rio de Janeiro, Brazil	35th (h)	800 m	1:48.48
2018	African Championships	Asaba, Nigeria	21st (h)	800 m	1:49.97
2019	African Games	Rabat, Morocco	18th (h)	800 m	1:50.89
2021	World Relays	Chorzów, Poland	3rd	4 × 400 m relay	3:04.77
2024	African Games	Accra, Ghana	4th	400 m	45.81
2024	African Games	Accra, Ghana	2nd	4 × 400 m relay	2:59.32
2024	African Championships	Douala, Cameroon	11th (sf)	400 m	47.79
2024	African Championships	Douala, Cameroon	1st	4 × 400 m relay	3:02.23
