= 2024 African Championships in Athletics =

2024 African Championships
- Dates: 21–26 June
- Host city: Douala, Cameroon
- Venue: Japoma Stadium Sports Complex
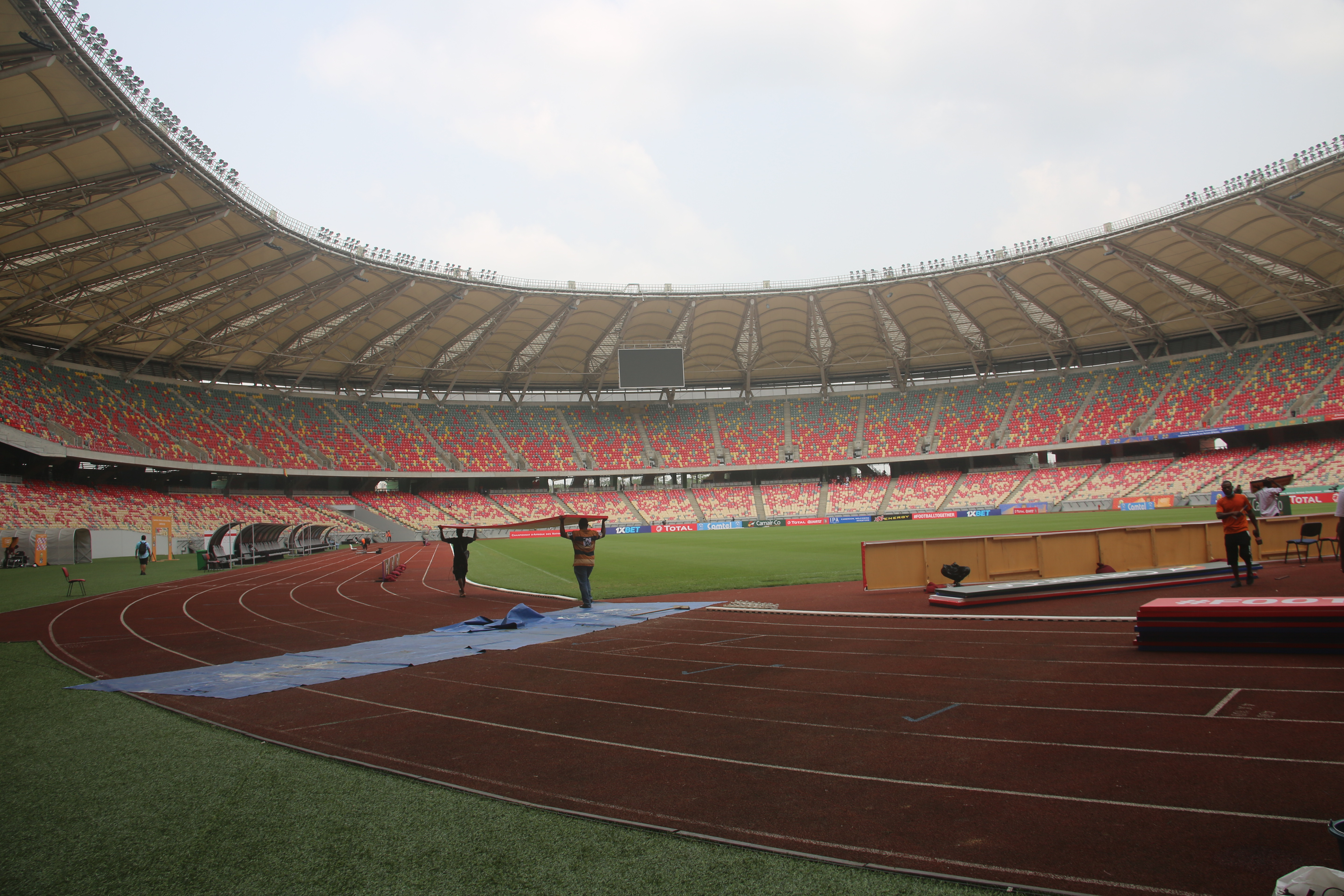
- Events: 45
- Participation: 618 athletes from 50 nations

The 23rd African Championships in Athletics was held in Douala, Cameroon from 21 to 26 June 2024, at the Japoma Stadium Sports Complex. This was the second time the event took place in Cameroon, after they previously hosted the event in 1996. Over 800 athletes from 49 African countries competed at the championships.

== Medal summary ==
=== Men ===
Chronology: 2020 | 2022 | 2024 | 2026 | 2028

Event	Gold		Silver		Bronze	
100 metres	Joseph Fahnbulleh; Liberia	10.13	Emmanuel Eseme; Cameroon	10.15	Benjamin Richardson; South Africa	10.17
200 metres	Joseph Fahnbulleh; Liberia	20.25	Tapiwa Makarawu; Zimbabwe	20.51	Emmanuel Eseme; Cameroon	20.66
400 metres	Cheikh Tidiane Diouf; Senegal	45.23	Lee Eppie; Botswana	45.39	Samuel Ogazi; Nigeria	45.47
800 metres	Alex Kipngetich; Kenya	1:45.02	Kethobogile Haingura; Botswana	1:45.54	Tom Dradriga; Uganda	1:46.01
1500 metres	Brian Komen; Kenya	3:33.95 CR	Ayanleh Abdi Abdillahi; Djibouti	3:36.24	Boaz Kiprugut; Kenya	3:37.25
5000 metres	Mohamed Ismail Ibrahim; Djibouti	13:38.38	Nibret Melak; Ethiopia	13:42.95	Abdi Waiss Mouhyadin; Djibouti	13:43.20
10,000 metres	Nibret Melak; Ethiopia	28:52.27	Gemechu Dida; Ethiopia	28:52.79	Roncer Kipkorir Konga; Kenya	28:52.94
110 metres hurdles	Louis François Mendy; Senegal	13.49 CR	Amine Bouanani; Algeria	13.59	Yousuf Badawy Sayed; Egypt	13.79
400 metres hurdles	Victor Ntweng; Botswana	48.88	Kemorena Tisang; Botswana	49.24	Abdelmalik Lahoulou; Algeria	49.36
3000 metres steeplechase	Leonard Chemutai; Uganda	8:21.30	Edmund Serem; Kenya	8:21.94	Matthew Kosgei; Kenya	8:21.98
4 × 100 metres relay	Ghana; Ibrahim Fuseini; Isaac Botsio; Edwin Gadayi; Abdul-Rasheed Saminu	38.63	Nigeria; Kayinsola Ajayi; Usheoritse Itsekiri; Alaba Olukunle Akintola; Oke Oghenebrume; Alexander Chukwukelu; Emmanuel Ifeanyi Ojeli	38.84	Ivory Coast; Gnamien Nehemie N'Goran; Ismaël Koné; Arthur Cissé; Kouadio Éric Kouame; Adzeu Yapo Jacky	39.77
4 × 400 metres relay	Botswana; Omphile Seribe; Busang Collen Kebinatshipi; Boitumelo Masilo; Leungo Scotch	3:02.23	Kenya; Kevin Kipkorir; Kelvin Sane Tauta; David Sanayek Kapirante; Brian Onyari Tinega	3:02.34	Zambia; Kennedy Luchembe; Patrick Kakozi Nyambe; David Mulenga; Muzala Samukonga	3:02.56
20 kilometres walk	Misgana Wakuma; Ethiopia	1:22.49	Heristone Wanyonyi; Kenya	1:23.26	Wayne Snyman; South Africa	1:25.19
High jump	Brian Raats; South Africa	2.18 m	Saad Hammouda; Morocco Kemboi Asbel Kiprop; Kenya	2.15 m	Not awarded	
Pole vault	Kyle Rademeyer; South Africa	5.20 m	Medhi Amar Rouana; Algeria	5.10 m	Boubacar Diallo; Mali	5.10 m
Long jump	Cheswill Johnson; South Africa	7.78 m	Chenoult Lionel Coetzee; Namibia	7.78 m	Goodness Iredia; Nigeria	7.75 m
Triple jump	Hugues Fabrice Zango; Burkina Faso	17.18 m	Chengetayi Mapaya; Zimbabwe	16.87 m	Amath Faye; Senegal	16.54 m
Shot put	Chukwuebuka Enekwechi; Nigeria	21.14 m	Mostafa Hassan; Egypt	20.25 m	Mohamed Magdi Hamza; Egypt	19.72 m
Discus throw	Oussama Khennoussi; Algeria	63.90 m CR, NR	Victor Hogan; South Africa	63.87 m	Ryan Williams; Namibia	56.78 m
Hammer throw	Mostafa El Gamel; Egypt	72.88 m	Ahmed Tarek Ismail; Egypt	70.71 m	Allan Cumming; South Africa	69.43 m
Javelin throw	Julius Yego; Kenya	80.24 m	Nnamdi Chinecherem; Nigeria	79.22 m	Mustafa Mahmoud Abdel Khaliq; Egypt	77.25 m
Decathlon	Larbi Bourrada; Algeria	7447 pts	Dhiae Boudoumi; Algeria	7218 pts	Edwin Kipmutai Too; Kenya	7132 pts

=== Women ===
Chronology: 2020 | 2022 | 2024 | 2026 | 2028

Event	Gold		Silver		Bronze	
100 metres	Gina Bass-Bittaye; Gambia	11.14	Maia McCoy; Liberia	11.16	Maboundou Koné; Ivory Coast	11.24
200 metres	Jessica Gbai; Ivory Coast	22.84	Maboundou Koné; Ivory Coast	22.99	Asimenye Simwaka; Malawi	23.05
400 metres	Miranda Coetzee; South Africa	51.16	Quincy Malekani; Zambia	51.56	Esther Elo Joseph; Nigeria	51.94
800 metres	Sarah Moraa; Kenya	2:00.27	Lilian Odira; Kenya	2:00.36	Soukaina Hajji; Morocco	2:00.91
1500 metres	Saron Berhe; Ethiopia	4:06.05	Caroline Nyaga; Kenya	4:06.76	Esther Chebet; Uganda	4:06.90
5000 metres	Fantaye Belayneh; Ethiopia	15:30.10	Wubrist Aschal; Ethiopia	15:30.25	Samiyah Hassan Nour; Djibouti	15:42.63
10,000 metres	Gladys Kwamboka; Kenya	36:53.59	Rebecca Mwangi; Kenya	36:59.69	Gela Hambese; Ethiopia	37:09.20
100 metres hurdles	Ebony Morrison; Liberia	12.70 CR NR	Marione Fourie; South Africa	12.74	Sidonie Fiadanantsoa; Madagascar	12.98
400 metres hurdles	Rogail Joseph; South Africa	55.71	Noura Ennadi; Morocco	56.16	Linda Angounou; Cameroon	56.48
3000 metres steeplechase	Loice Chekwemoi; Uganda	9:24.47	Alemnat Walle Fenta; Ethiopia	9:35.19	Leah Jeruto; Kenya	9:36.33
4 × 100 metres relay	Nigeria; Justina Tiana Eyakpobeyan; Tima Seikeseye Godbless; Olayinka Olajide; Tobi Amusan; Adaobi Tabugbo	43.01 CR	Ghana; Mary Boakye; Anita Afrifa; Halutie Hor; Deborah Acheampong	43.62	Liberia; Destiny Smith-Barnett; Maia McCoy; Ebony Morrison; Thelma Davies; Symone Darius	44.38
4 × 400 metres relay	Nigeria; Patience Okon George; Esther Elo Joseph; Omolara Ogunmakinju; Ella Onojuvwevwo	3:27.31 CR	Zambia; Rhoda Njobvu; Niddy Mingilishi; Quincy Malekani; Abygirl Sepiso	3:32.18	Kenya; Joan Cherono; Veronica Kamumbe Mutua; Esther Mbagari; Mercy Chebet	3:32.65
20 kilometres walk	Sintayehu Masire Teshager; Ethiopia	1:37.46	Souad Azzi; Algeria	1:40.36	Margret Gati Chacha; Kenya	1:41.19
High jump	Rose Yeboah; Ghana	1.87 m	Temitope Adeshina; Nigeria	1.84 m	Fatoumata Balley; Guinea	1.84 m
Pole vault	Miré Reinstorf; South Africa	4.10 m	Dorra Mahfoudhi; Tunisia	3.60 m	Not awarded	
Long jump	Ese Brume; Nigeria	6.73 m	Marthe Koala; Burkina Faso	6.72 m	Danielle Nolte; South Africa	6.44 m
Triple jump	Saly Sarr; Senegal	14.06 m	Anne-Suzanna Fosther-Katta; Cameroon	13.45 m	Veronique Kossenda Rey; Cameroon	13.35 m
Shot put	Ashley Erasmus; South Africa	18.17 m	Miné de Klerk; South Africa	17.09 m	Colette Uys; South Africa	16.28 m
Discus throw	Ashley Anumba; Nigeria	59.30 m	Obiageri Amaechi; Nigeria	58.80 m	Chioma Onyekwere; Nigeria	57.93 m
Hammer throw	Zahra Tatar; Algeria	67.82 m	Oyesade Olatoye; Nigeria	67.72 m	Zouina Bouzebra; Algeria	65.48 m
Javelin throw	Jo-Ane van Dyk; South Africa	57.03 m	Jana van Schalkwyk; South Africa	55.14 m	Josephine Joyce Lalam; Uganda	53.57 m
Heptathlon	Odile Ahouanwanou; Benin	5777 pts	Adèle Mafogang; Cameroon	5527 pts	Shannon Verster; South Africa	5239 pts

=== Mixed ===
Event	Gold		Silver		Bronze	
4 × 400 metres relay	South Africa; Gardeo Isaacs; Shirley Nekhubui; Mthi Mthimkulu; Miranda Coetzee	3:13.12 CR NR	Nigeria; Ifeanyi Emmanuel Ojeli; Ella Onojuvwevwo; Dubem Nwachukwu; Patience Okon George	3:13.72	Botswana; Leungo Scotch; Obakeng Kamberuka; Bayapo Ndori; Galefele Moroko	3:15.93

== Medal table ==
* Host nation (Cameroon)

Rank	Nation	Gold	Silver	Bronze	Total
1	South Africa (RSA)	9	4	6	19
2	Kenya (KEN)	5	7	7	19
3	Nigeria (NGR)	5	6	4	15
4	Ethiopia (ETH)	5	4	1	10
5	Algeria (ALG)	3	4	1	8
6	Liberia (LBR)	3	1	1	5
7	Senegal (SEN)	3	0	1	4
8	Botswana (BOT)	2	3	1	6
9	Ghana (GHA)	2	1	0	3
10	Uganda (UGA)	2	0	3	5
11	Egypt (EGY)	1	2	3	6
12	Djibouti (DJI)	1	1	2	4
12	Ivory Coast (CIV)	1	1	2	4
14	Burkina Faso (BUR)	1	1	0	2
15	Benin (BEN)	1	0	0	1
15	Gambia (GAM)	1	0	0	1
17	Cameroon (CMR)*	0	3	3	6
18	Morocco (MAR)	0	2	1	3
18	Zambia (ZAM)	0	2	1	3
20	Zimbabwe (ZIM)	0	2	0	2
21	Namibia (NAM)	0	1	1	2
22	Tunisia (TUN)	0	1	0	1
23	Central African Republic (CAF)	0	0	1	1
23	Guinea (GUI)	0	0	1	1
23	Madagascar (MAD)	0	0	1	1
23	Malawi (MAW)	0	0	1	1
23	Mali (MLI)	0	0	1	1
Totals (27 entries)		45	46	43	134

== Participating nations ==
- Algeria (17)
- Angola (2)
- Benin (12)
- Botswana (32)
- Burkina Faso (13)
- Burundi (3)
- Cameroon (57)
- Cape Verde (3)
- Central African Republic (4)
- Chad (8)
- Comoros (1)
- Democratic Republic of the Congo (6)
- Djibouti (10)
- Egypt (9)
- Equatorial Guinea (3)
- Eritrea (3)
- Eswatini (5)
- Ethiopia (67)
- Gabon (4)
- Gambia (8)
- Ghana (19)
- Guinea (4)
- Guinea-Bissau (2)
- Ivory Coast (12)
- Kenya (60)
- Lesotho (2)
- Liberia (10)
- Libya (2)
- Madagascar (2)
- Malawi (1)
- Mali (5)
- Mauritius (10)
- Morocco (17)
- Mozambique (3)
- Namibia (25)
- Niger (2)
- Nigeria (37)
- Republic of the Congo (9)
- São Tomé and Príncipe (2)
- Senegal (18)
- Seychelles (8)
- Sierra Leone (1)
- Somalia (2)
- South Africa (55)
- South Sudan (1)
- Togo (6)
- Tunisia (4)
- Uganda (14)
- Zambia (8)
- Zimbabwe (10)

== See also ==
- Algeria at the 2024 African Championships in Athletics
- Angola at the 2024 African Championships in Athletics
