= Dubem Nwachukwu =

Nigerian-American sprinter (born 2000)

Personal information
- Full name: Dubem Nonyelu Nwachukwu
- Nationality: Nigerian / American
- Born: 8 February 2000 (age 26) United States

Sport
- Sport: Athletics
- Event: 400 m

Achievements and titles
- Personal best(s): 400 m 44.81 (Austin, 2023)
Medal record
Men's athletics
Representing Nigeria
African Games
Bronze medal – third place	2023 Accra	4x400 m relay
African Championships
Silver medal – second place	2024 Douala	Mixed 4×400 m relay

Dubem Nonyelu Nwachukwu (born 8 February 2000) is a track and field athlete who competes over 400 metres. Born in the United States, he represents Nigeria internationally.

== Early life ==
From Katy, Texas in the United States, he attended St. Thomas High School and Texas A&M University–Corpus Christi and Arizona State University. He finished fifth in the 400 metres at the 2023 NCAA Outdoor Championships.

== Career ==
Nwachukwu was cleared by World Athletics to switch from the United States to Nigeria in 2023. That summer, he finished second over 400 metres at the Nigerian trials. In August 2023, he competed for Nigeria in Budapest at the 2023 World Athletics Championships.

In March 2024, he was selected for the 2024 World Athletics Indoor Championships in Glasgow, where he reached the semi-final of the men's 400 meters.

He ran as part of the Nigerian 4 × 400 m relay team which qualified for the 2024 Paris Olympics at the 2024 World Relays Championships in Nassau, Bahamas. In July 2024, he was officially named as part of the Nigerian team for the 2024 Paris Olympics to compete in the relay.
