= Jonathan Jones (runner) =

Barbadian athlete (born 1999)

Personal information
- Full name: Jonathan Jones
- Nationality: Barbadian
- Born: 6 February 1999 (age 27)

Sport
- Sport: Athletics
- Event: 400 metres
- University team: Texas Longhorns

Achievements and titles
- Personal bests: 400 meters: 44.43 (2022, NR); 800 meters: 1:45.83 (2022, NR)
Medal record
Men's athletics
Representing Barbados
Commonwealth Games
Bronze medal – third place	2022 Birmingham	400 m
NACAC U23 Championships
Gold medal – first place	2021 San José	400 m

Jonathan Jones (born 6 February 1999) is a sprinter from Barbados.

He qualified for the 2020 Tokyo Olympics in 2019 when at the NCAA Outdoor Track and Field Championships, he finished fourth in the men's 400 metres final with a then-new national record time of 44.64 seconds. He won the 400 m gold medal in the 2021 NACAC U23 Championships.

While competing in the 2020 Summer Games 400m races, Jones qualified from his heat before running 45.61 to finish eighth in his semi-final.

He won the 400m final at the Big 12 Championships, held at Fuller Track & Field Stadium in Lubbock, Texas, on May 15, 2022. His time of 44.43s established a new personal best and Barbadian National record.

Jones reached the final of the 2022 World Athletics Championships with the sixth fastest time of the heats. In the final, Jones finished eighth.

At the 2022 Commonwealth Games, Jones collected a bronze medal in the Men's 400m, with a time of 44.89s.

Selected for the 2023 World Athletics Championships in Budapest, he competed in the 400 metres.

He ran as part of the Barbadian 4x400m relay team at the 2024 World Relays Championships in Nassau, Bahamas.
