= Johnson Nnamani =

Nigerian sprinter

Personal information
- Full name: Johnson Chidera Nnamani
- Nationality: Nigerian
- Born: 28 July 2003 (age 22)

Sport
- Sport: Athletics
- Event: 400 metres
Medal record
Men's athletics
Representing Nigeria
World U20 Championships
Gold medal – first place	2021 Nairobi	Mixed 4 × 400 m
African Championships
Bronze medal – third place	2022 Mauritius	Men's 4 × 400 m

Johnson Chidera Nnamani (born 28 July 2003) is a Nigerian male sprinter athlete who competed for Nigeria at local and international table tennis competitions.

== Achievements ==
Adeyemi participated in the men's 4 × 400 metres relay event at the 2022 Commonwealth Games representing Nigeria.

Nnamani alongside Deborah Oke, Imaobong Nse Uko and Bamidele Ajayi were part of the team that won gold medal at the World U-20 Athletics Championships in Nairobi, Kenya. They set a new championship record of 3:19.70 to win the gold medal in the Mixed 4 × 400 m relay.
