= Gardeo Isaacs =

South African sprinter (born 1998)

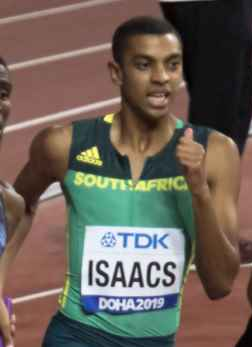

Personal information
- Nationality: South African
- Born: 27 December 1998 (age 27)

Sport
- Sport: Track and Field
- Event: 400 m

Achievements and titles
- Personal bests: 200 m: 20.73 (Johannesburg, 2022); 400 m: 45.15 (Potchefstroom, 2023)
Medal record
Men's athletics
Representing South Africa
World Championships
Bronze medal – third place	2025 Tokyo	4 × 400 m relay
World Relays
Gold medal – first place	2025 Guangzhou	4×400 m relay
Silver medal – second place	2024 Nassau	4×400 m relay
African Championships
Gold medal – first place	2024 Douala	Mixed 4×400 m relay
Summer Universiade
Silver medal – second place	2019 Naples	4×400 m relay
Bronze medal – third place	2019 Naples	400m

Gardeo Isaacs (born 27 December 1998) is a South African sprinter. He became South African national champion in 2019 over 400 metres.

== Early life ==
From Parow, Cape Town he attended Stellenbosch University where he studied Management Accounting.

== Career ==
He won the South African 400m national title in April 2019 in Germiston in a time of 45.39 seconds. He won the 400m at the South African Varsity Athletics meet in 2019, running a time of 45.70 seconds. Later that year, he went on to win the bronze medal in 45.89 seconds for South Africa at the 2019 Summer Universiade in Naples, Italy. He ran as part of the South African 4 × 400 m relay team at the 2019 IAAF World Championships in Doha having also ran as a part of the team at the 2019 IAAF World Relays in Japan.

He ran for South Africa at the 2022 African Championships in Athletics in Mauritius. He came third in the 400 metres at the South African Championships in Potchefstroom in 2023, in a new personal best time of 45.15 seconds.

In Pretoria, in March 2024, he ran a personal best 31.91 for the 300 metres. He ran as part of the South African 4 × 400 m relay team which qualified for the 2024 Paris Olympics at the 2024 World Relays Championships in Nassau, Bahamas. He competed in the men's 4 x 400 metres relay at the 2024 Paris Olympics.

He was selected for the South African relay pool at the 2025 World Athletics Relays in China, where he was a gold medalist in the Men's 4 × 400 metres relay as the South African team set a new national record of 2:57.50 in the final.

Selected for the 2025 World Athletics Championships, he ran in the mixed 4 × 400 metres relay as the South African team finished sixth overall. He was later a bronze medalist in the men's 4 x 400 metres relay after running in the opening round although not the final.

In May 2026, he ran at the 2026 World Athletics Relays in the mixed 4 × 400 metres relay in Gaborone, Botswana.
