= Wiseman Mukhobe =

Kenyan athlete (born 1997)

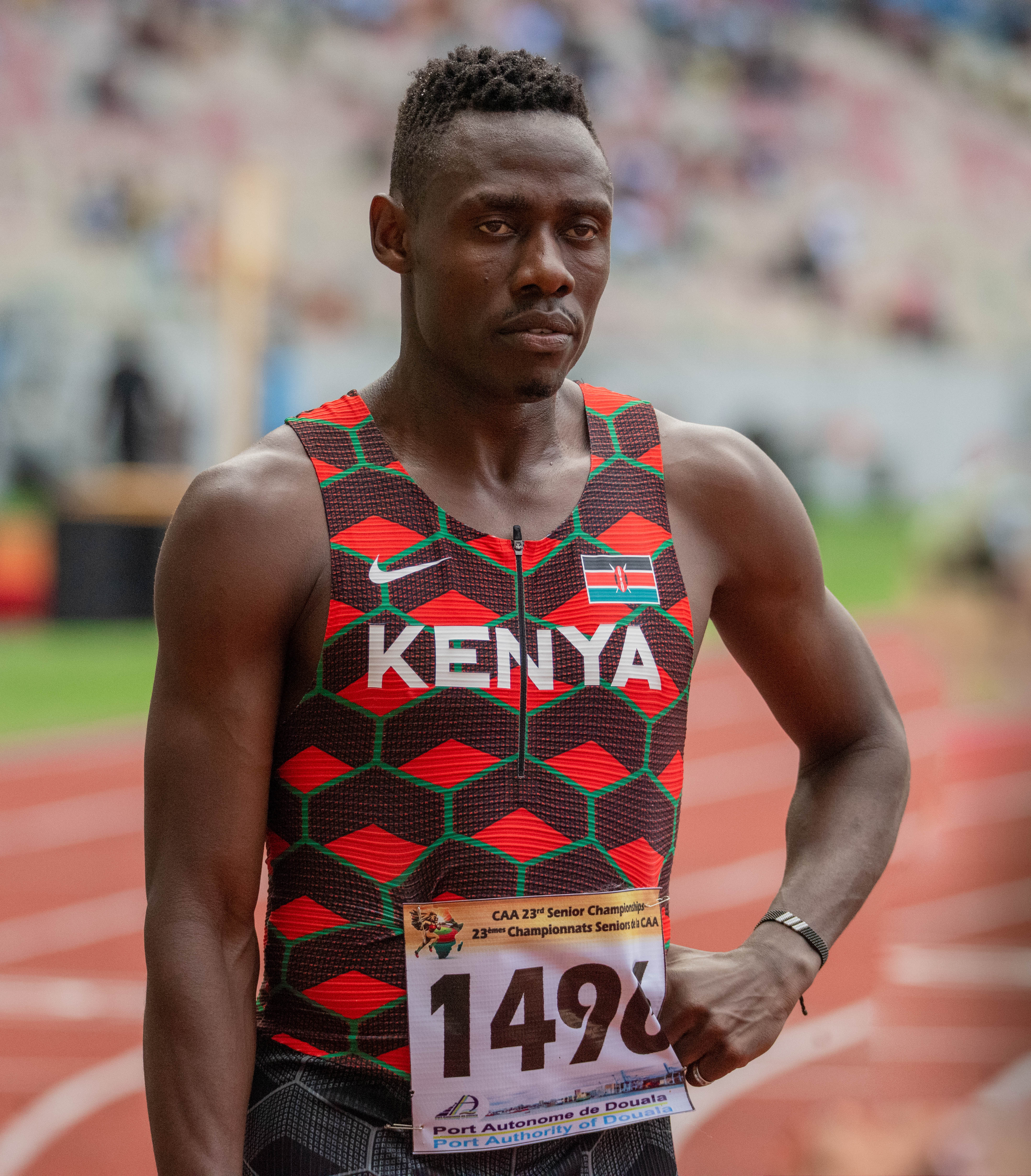

Personal information
- Nationality: Kenyan
- Born: Wiseman Were Mukhobe; 13 October 1997 (age 29)

Sport
- Sport: Track and Field
- Events: 400m hurdles, 400m

Achievements and titles
- Personal bests: 400 m: 45.96 (Nairobi 2024); 400 mH: 48.27 (Tokyo 2025)
Medal record
Men's athletics
Representing Kenya
Commonwealth Games
| Bronze medal – third place | 2022 Birmingham | 4x400 m relay |
African Championships
| Bronze medal – third place | 2022 Saint Pierre | 400 m hurdles |

Wiseman Were Mukhobe (born 13 October 1997) is a Kenyan athlete. He was a medalist at the 2022 Commonwealth Games as part of the Kenya team in the 4 × 400 m relay, and finished fourth in the final of the 400m hurdles.

== Biography ==
Mukhobe finished fourth in the men's 400m hurdles at the 2022 Commonwealth Games. Mukhobe then won a bronze medal as part of the Kenyan 4 × 400 m relay team which came third at the same Games.

On 20 April 2024, he won the 400 metres hurdles at the Kip Keino Classic in Nairobi in a meeting record time of 48.57. He ran as part of the Kanyan 4 × 400 m relay team at the 2024 World Relays Championships in Nassau, Bahamas.

He won ahead of Moitalel Naadokila in the 400m hurdles at the 2024 Kenyan Olympic Trials in June 2024. He subsequently competed at the 2024 Summer Olympics in Paris in August 2024, in the 400 metres hurdles, reaching the semi-finals.

He ran a new personal best of 48.34 seconds to win the Kip Keino Classic in Nairobi on 31 May 2025 and set a new meeting record. He won the 400m hurdles title at the Kenyan Athletics Championships in June 2025. Selected for the 2025 World Athletics Championships in Tokyo, Japan, in September 2025, he was a semi-finalist in the men's 400 metres hurdles, running a personal best of 48.27 seconds in the preliminary round.

In March 2026, it was reported that he was suspended by the Anti-Doping Agency for Kenya due to whereabouts failures.
