= 2022 African Championships in Athletics =

2022 African Championships
- Dates: 8–12 June
- Host city: Saint Pierre, Mauritius
- Venue: Cote d'Or National Sports Complex
- Events: 45
- Records set: 1 CR

The 22nd African Championships in Athletics were held in Saint Pierre, Mauritius from 8 to 12 June 2022, at the Cote d'Or National Sports Complex. This was the third time the event was held in Mauritius, and 500 athletes from 40 African countries out of 54 countries participated in the 22nd edition of the Senior Africa Championship. The event was originally scheduled to be held in 2020 in Oran, Algeria, but had to be cancelled due to the COVID-19 pandemic.

== Medal summary ==
=== Men ===
Chronology: 2018 | 2020 | 2022 | 2024 | 2026

Event	Gold		Silver		Bronze	
100 metres	Ferdinand Omanyala; Kenya	9.93	Akani Simbine; South Africa	9.93	Henricho Bruintjies; South Africa	10.01
200 metres	Letsile Tebogo; Botswana	20.26	Emmanuel Eseme; Cameroon	20.61	Clarence Munyai; South Africa	20.69
400 metres	Muzala Samukonga; Zambia	45.31	Bayapo Ndori; Botswana	45.35	Mohamed Farès Jelassi; Tunisia	45.54
800 metres	Slimane Moula; Algeria	1:45.59	Nicholas Kiplangat Kebenei; Kenya	1:46.43	Tshepiso Masalela; Botswana	1:46.65
1500 metres	Abel Kipsang; Kenya	3:36.57	Ryan Mphahlele; South Africa	3:36.74	Adihana Kasaye; Ethiopia	3:38.27
5000 metres	Hailemariyam Amare; Ethiopia	13:36.79	Daniel Ebenyo; Kenya	13:38.79	Hicham Akankam; Morocco	13:40.39
10,000 metres	Mogos Tuemay; Ethiopia	29:19.01	Chimdessa Debele; Ethiopia	29:22.74	Abraham Longosiwa; Kenya	29:23.02
110 metres hurdles	Amine Bouanani; Algeria	13.26	Jeremie Lararaudeuse; Mauritius	13.55	Antonio Alkana; South Africa	13.59
400 metres hurdles	Sokwakhana Zazini; South Africa	49.42	Abdelmalik Lahoulou; Algeria	50.10	Wiseman Mukhobe; Kenya	50.48
3000 metres steeplechase	Hailemariyam Amare; Ethiopia	8:27.38	Tadese Takele; Ethiopia	8:28.31	Geoffrey Kirwa; Kenya	8:29.74
4 × 100 metres relay	Kenya; Dan Asamba; Mike Nyang'au; Samwel Imeta; Ferdinand Omanyala	39.28 NR	South Africa; Henricho Bruintjies; Antonio Alkana; Cheswill Johnson; Benjamin Richardson; Rivaldo Roberts; Akani Simbine	39.79	Zimbabwe; Ngoni Makusha; Dickson Kamungeremu; Tapiwa Makarawu; Denzel Simusialela	39.81
4 × 400 metres relay	Botswana; Busang Collen Kebinatshipi; Leungo Scotch; Anthony Pesela; Bayapo Ndori; Keitumetse Maitseo	3:04.27	Zambia; Muzala Samukonga; Kennedy Luchembe; Patrick Kakozi Nyambe; David Mulenga	3:05.53	Nigeria; Johnson Nnamani; Chidi Okezie; Sikiru Adeyemi; Emmanuel Ojeli; Ayo Adeola	3:07.05
20 kilometres walk	Samuel Gathimba; Kenya	1:22:01	Wayne Snyman; South Africa	1:22:05	Yohanis Algaw; Ethiopia	1:22:21
High jump	Hichem Bouhanoun; Algeria	2.15 m	Mike Edwards; Nigeria	2.15 m	Mpho Links; South Africa	2.15 m
Pole vault	Medhi-Amar Rouana; Algeria	5.30 m	Hichem Khalil Cherabi; Algeria	5.20 m	Valco van Wyk; South Africa	4.90 m
Long jump	Thalosang Tshireletso; Botswana	7.82 m	Cheswill Johnson; South Africa	7.78 m	Amath Faye; Senegal	7.70 m
Triple jump	Hugues Fabrice Zango; Burkina Faso	17.34 m	Thalosang Tshireletso; Botswana	16.77 m	Yasser Triki; Algeria	16.58 m
Shot put	Chukwuebuka Enekwechi; Nigeria	21.20 m CR	Kyle Blignaut; South Africa	20.60 m	Mohamed Magdy; Egypt	20.33 m
Discus throw	Werner Visser; South Africa	61.80 m	Victor Hogan; South Africa	58.95 m	Ryan Williams; Namibia	56.70 m
Hammer throw	Allan Cumming; South Africa	69.13 m	Tshepang Makhethe; South Africa	68.75 m	Alaa el-Din el-Ashry; Egypt	68.24 m
Javelin throw	Julius Yego; Kenya	79.62 m	Ihab Abdelrahman; Egypt	77.12 m	Phillippus Janse van Rensburg; South Africa	74.10 m
Decathlon	Larbi Bourrada; Algeria	7776 pts	Fredriech Pretorius; South Africa	7504 pts	Jesse Perez; South Africa	7396 pts

=== Women ===
Chronology: 2018 | 2020 | 2022 | 2024 | 2026

Event	Gold		Silver		Bronze	
100 metres	Gina Bass; Gambia	11.06	Aminatou Seyni; Niger	11.08	Carina Horn; South Africa	11.09
200 metres	Aminatou Seyni; Niger	23.04	Maximilla Imali; Kenya	23.43	Rhoda Njobvu; Zambia	23.51
400 metres	Miranda Coetzee; South Africa	51.82	Niddy Mingilishi; Zambia	52.36	Veronica Mutua; Kenya	52.76
800 metres	Jarinter Mwasya; Kenya	2:02.80	Netsanet Desta; Ethiopia	2:02.99	Prudence Sekgodiso; South Africa	2:03.46
1500 metres	Winny Chebet; Kenya	4:16.10	Purity Chepkirui; Kenya	4:16.28	Ayal Dagnachew; Ethiopia	4:16.45
5000 metres	Beatrice Chebet; Kenya	15:00.82 CR	Fantaye Belayneh; Ethiopia	15:01.89	Caroline Nyaga; Kenya	15:05.34
10,000 metres	Caroline Nyaga; Kenya	32:12.61	Rachael Zena Chebet; Uganda	32:17.66	Meseret Gebre; Ethiopia	32:25.97
100 metres hurdles	Tobi Amusan; Nigeria	12.57	Ebony Morrison; Liberia	12.77	Marione Fourie; South Africa	12.93
400 metres hurdles	Zenéy van der Walt; South Africa	56.00	Taylon Bieldt; South Africa	56.67	Noura Ennadi; Morocco	58.06
3000 metres steeplechase	Werkuha Getachew; Ethiopia	9:36.81	Zerfe Wondemagegn; Ethiopia	9:41.37	Caren Chebet; Kenya	9:43.64
4 × 100 metres relay	Nigeria; Praise Idamadudu; Tima Godbless; Praise Ofoku; Tobi Amusan; Joy Abu; Balikis Yakubu	44.45	South Africa; Marzaan Loots; Banele Shabangu; Charlize Eilerd; Phindile Kubheka; Tamzin Thomas	44.87	Gambia; Fatou Sowe; Maimouna Jallow; Nyimasata Jawneh; Gina Bass	44.97
4 × 400 metres relay	South Africa; Miranda Coetzee; Taylon Bieldt; Precious Molepo; Zenéy van der Walt	3:29.34	Kenya; Jacinta Shikanda; Hellen Syombua; Joan Cherono; Veronica Mutua	3:35.55	Nigeria; Deborah Oke; Queen Usunobun; Ella Onojuvwevwo; Patience Okon George	3:36.24
20 kilometres walk	Emily Ngii; Kenya	1:34:30	Yehualeye Beletew; Ethiopia	1:35:48	Silvia Kemboi; Kenya	1:39:40
High jump	Rose Yeboah; Ghana	1.79 m	Temitope Adeshina; Nigeria	1.79 m	Yvonne Robson; South Africa	1.79 m
Pole vault	Mirè Reinstorf; South Africa	3.80 m	Dorra Mahfoudhi; Tunisia	3.70 m	Nicole Janse van Rensburg; South Africa	3.70 m
Long jump	Marthe Koala; Burkina Faso	6.42 m	Yousra Lajdoud; Morocco	6.37 m	Esraa Owis; Egypt	6.29 m
Triple jump	Sangoné Kandji; Senegal	13.76 m	Saly Sarr; Senegal	13.42 m	Veronique Kossenda Rey; Cameroon	13.35 m
Shot put	Ischke Senekal; South Africa	16.40 m	Carine Mékam; Gabon	15.87 m	Zonica Lindeque; South Africa	15.79 m
Discus throw	Chioma Onyekwere; Nigeria	58.19 m	Nora Atim Monie; Cameroon	54.44 m	Obiageri Amaechi; Nigeria	54.15 m
Hammer throw	Oyesade Olatoye; Nigeria	63.67 m	Zouina Bouzebra; Algeria	63.48 m	Rawan Barakat; Egypt	62.67 m
Javelin throw	Jo-Ane van Dyk; South Africa	60.65 m	Mckyla van der Westhuizen; South Africa	55.55 m	Jana van Schalkwyk; South Africa	54.49 m
Heptathlon	Odile Ahouanwanou; Benin	5756 pts	Shannon Verster; South Africa	5329 pts	Nada Chroudi; Tunisia	5117 pts

=== Mixed ===
Event	Gold		Silver		Bronze	
4 × 400 metres relay	Botswana; Busang Collen Kebinatshipi; Motlatsi Ranthe; Keitumetse Maitseo; Christine Botlogetswe	3:21.85	Nigeria; Emmanuel Ojeli; Ella Onojuvwevwo; Ayo Adeola; Patience Okon George	3:22.38	Kenya; Collins Omae Gichana; William Rayian; Veronica Mutua; Jarinter Mwasya	3:22.75

== Medal table ==
* Host nation (Host nation)

Rank	Nation	Gold	Silver	Bronze	Total
1	Kenya (KEN)	10	5	8	23
2	South Africa (RSA)	9	13	14	36
3	Nigeria (NGR)	5	3	3	11
4	Algeria (ALG)	5	3	1	9
5	Ethiopia (ETH)	4	6	4	14
6	Botswana (BOT)	4	2	1	7
7	Burkina Faso (BFA)	2	0	0	2
8	Zambia (ZAM)	1	2	1	4
9	Senegal (SEN)	1	1	1	3
10	Niger (NIG)	1	1	0	2
11	Gambia (GAM)	1	0	1	2
12	Benin (BEN)	1	0	0	1
12	Ghana (GHA)	1	0	0	1
14	Cameroon (CMR)	0	2	1	3
15	Egypt (EGY)	0	1	4	5
16	Morocco (MAR)	0	1	2	3
16	Tunisia (TUN)	0	1	2	3
18	Gabon (GAB)	0	1	0	1
18	Liberia (LBR)	0	1	0	1
18	Mauritius (MRI)*	0	1	0	1
18	Uganda (UGA)	0	1	0	1
22	Namibia (NAM)	0	0	1	1
22	Zimbabwe (ZIM)	0	0	1	1
Totals (23 entries)		45	45	45	135
