= Téo Andant =

French-Monegasque sprinter (born 1999)

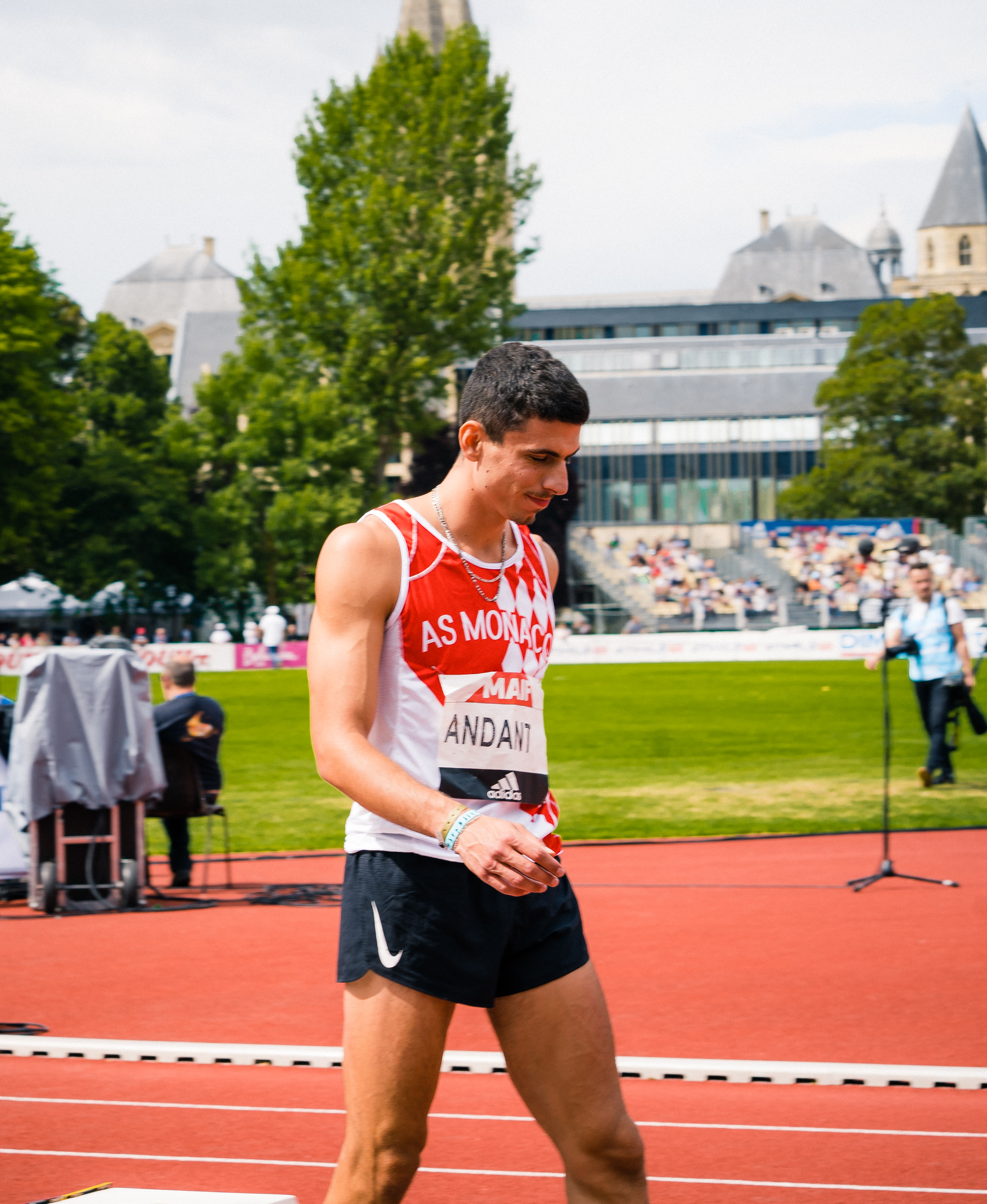
- Andant in 2022

Personal information
- Born: 21 July 1999 (age 27) Nice, France
- Height: 1.81 m (5 ft 11 in)
- Weight: 75 kg (165 lb)

Sport
- Sport: Athletics
- Event: 400 metres
- Club: AS Monaco
- Coached by: Marc Vecchio

Achievements and titles
- Personal bests: Outdoor; 200 m: 20.69 (Monaco 2025); 400 m: 45.18 (Madrid 2023); 800 m: 1:51.69 (L'Étang-Salé 2021); Indoor; 400 m: 46.21 (Metz 2025)
Medal record
Men's athletics
Representing France
World Championships
Silver medal – second place	2023 Budapest	4×400 m relay
European Championships
Bronze medal – third place	2022 Munich	4×400 m relay
European Indoor Championships
Silver medal – second place	2023 Istanbul	4×400 m relay
European U23 Championships
Gold medal – first place	2021 Tallinn	4×400 m relay

Téo Andant (born 21 July 1999) is a French and Monegasque sprinter and middle-distance runner who specializes in the 400 metres. He won a bronze medal in the 4×400 m relay at the 2022 European Athletics Championships.

From Menton, he represents Monaco since 2023.
