= William Mutunga =

Kenyan athlete

William Mbevi Mutanga
Personal information
- Nationality: Kenyan
- Born: William Mbevi Mutunga; 12 July 1993 (age 33)

Sport
- Sport: Track and Field
- Events: 400m hurdles, 400m
Medal record
Men's athletics
Representing Kenya
Commonwealth Games
| Bronze medal – third place | 2022 Birmingham | 4 x 400m |
Summer Youth Olympics
| Bronze medal – third place | 2010 Singapore | 400 m hurdles |

William Mbevi Mutanga (born 12 July 1993) is a Kenyan athlete.

== Career ==
He won the bronze medal at the Athletics at the 2010 Summer Youth Olympics – Boys' 400 metre hurdles. He finished fifth in the final of the 400m hurdles at the 2022 Commonwealth Games. At the same Games he then won a bronze medal as part of the Kenyan 4 × 400 m relay team.
