= Veronica Kamumbe Mutua =

Kenyan track and field athlete (born 1992)

Medal record

Women's athletics

Representing Kenya

African Championships
Silver medal – second place	2018 Asaba	4×400 m

Veronica Kamumbe Mutua (born 2 February 1992) is a Kenyan track and field athlete, who competes in 400 meters. She competed at the 2017 IAAF World Relays, participating in the women's 400m and mixed 400m relay teams. She competed in the 2018 Commonwealth Games, reaching the semifinals in the women's 400m event. Her personal best in the 400 meters of 52.14 seconds was recorded on June 10, 2017.

She was born in Makueni County.
