= Zakithi Nene =

South African sprinter

Personal information
- Nationality: South African
- Born: 2 April 1998 (age 28) Ladysmith, South Africa

Sport
- Sport: Track and Field
- Event: 400 m

Achievements and titles
- Personal bests: 100 m: 10.68 (Durban 2021); 200 m: 20.72 A (Pretoria 2021); 300 m: 32.55 (Durban 2020); 400 m: 43.76 A (Nairobi 2025)
Medal record
Men's athletics
Representing South Africa
World Championships
Bronze medal – third place	2025 Tokyo	4 × 400 m relay
Commonwealth Games
Bronze medal – third place	2026 Glasgow	400 m
World Relays
Gold medal – first place	2025 Guangzhou	4 × 400 m relay
Silver medal – second place	2024 Nassau	4 × 400 m relay
Silver medal – second place	2026 Gaborone	4×400 m relay
Summer Universiade
Silver medal – second place	2019 Naples	4 × 400 m relay
African Championships
Silver medal – second place	2018 Asaba	4 × 400 m relay

Zakithi Nene (born 2 April 1998) is a South African sprinter, who specializes in the 400 metres.

== Biography ==
Nene won the South African 400 metres national title in 2021 and qualified for the 2020 Summer Olympics through his world ranking. He competed in the 400 metres where he ran a time of 45.74 seconds.

He ran as part of the South African 4 × 400 m relay team which qualified for the 2024 Paris Olympics at the 2024 World Relays Championships in Nassau, Bahamas. He finished third in the 400 metres at the 2024 BAUHAUS-galan in Stockholm on 2 June 2024.

He competed at the 2024 Summer Olympics over 400 metres in August 2024, reaching the semi-finals. He also competed in the men's 4 × 400 m relay at the Games.

He was selected for the South African relay pool at the 2025 World Athletics Relays in China, where he was a gold medalist in the Men's 4 × 400 metres relay, running the anchor leg and splitting 43.64 in the final as the South African team set a new national record of 2:57.50 in May 2025. Later that month, he ran 44.46 seconds to finish runner-up to Jacory Patterson in the 400 metres at the 2025 Meeting International Mohammed VI d'Athlétisme de Rabat, part of the 2025 Diamond League. He ran a new personal best of 43.76 seconds to win the Kip Keino Classic in Nairobi on 31 May 2025. He was runner-up in the 400 metres at the Diamond League event at the 2025 Golden Gala in Rome on 6 June 2025. He finished third in the 400 m in 44.29 seconds at the 2025 London Athletics Meet.

Competing at the 2025 World Athletics Championships in Tokyo, Japan, he ran 44.34 seconds in his heat and 44.20 seconds in his semi-final to qualify for the 400 m final, where he placed fifth overall. He was also a bronze medalist in the men's 4 x 400 metres relay.

In April 2026, Nene won ahead of Zambian Olympic bronze medallist Muzala Samukonga over 400 m, winning in 44.50 seconds, at the Kip Keino Classic. Competing on the opening day at the 2026 World Athletics Relays on 2 May, he was part of the South African men's 4 x 400 metres team which won their heat in 2:58.04. The following day, he ran as the team won the silver medal and set a new South African national record 2:55.07 to move to fifth on the all-time list. Later that month, he had a third-place finish over 400 m at the 2026 Xiamen Diamond League and fourth in the 400 metres at the 2026 Meeting International Mohammed VI d'Athlétisme de Rabat. On 7 June, Nene had his first win in the 2026 Diamond League at the 2026 Bauhausgalan in Stockholm, running 44.48 seconds, . and on 28 June, finished runner-up with 43.89 as Collen Kebinatshipi broke the Diamond League record in the 400 metres at the 2026 Meeting de Paris. On 1 August, he won the bronze medal in the 400 metres final at the 2026 Commonwealth Games in Glasgow, Scotland. At the 2026 Diamond League Final in Brussels in September, he placed sixth over 400 metres. Later that month, he competed over 400 m at the inaugural World Ultimate Championship in Budapest.

== Personal life ==
He studied economics at the University of KwaZulu-Natal in his native South Africa.
