= David Mulenga =

Zambian athlete

Personal information
- Full name: Chanda David Mulenga
- Born: 8 August 2002 (age 23)

Sport
- Sport: Athletics
- Event: Sprint

Achievements and titles
- Personal best: 400 m: 46.14 s (2021)
Medal record
Men's athletics
Representing Zambia
African Games
Gold medal – first place	2023 Accra	4 × 400 m relay
African Championships
Silver medal – second place	2022 Saint Pierre	4 × 400 m relay
Bronze medal – third place	2024 Douala	4 × 400 m relay

Chanda David Mulenga (born 8 August 2002) is a Zambian sprinter. He reached the final of the men's 4 × 400 metres relay at the 2024 Summer Olympics.

== Career ==
He ran as a member of the Zambian 4 × 400 metres relay team won the silver medal at the 2022 African Championships in Port Louis, Mauritius.

He ran the 4 × 400 m relay at the 2022 Commonwealth Games in Birmingham, England. They came through the heats to qualify for the final, placing fifth overall.

He won gold with the Zambian 4 × 400 m team at the delayed 2023 African Games in Accra, in a national record time of 2.59:12. That time proved to be enough for the team qualify for the 2024 Olympic Games by ranking.

He ran as part of the Zambian 4 × 400 m relay team at the 2024 World Relays Championships in Nassau, Bahamas.

He won bronze with the Zambian 4 × 400 m relay team at the 2024 African Championships in Athletics in Douala, Cameroon in June 2024.

He competed in the men's 4 × 400 m relay at the 2024 Summer Olympics in Paris as part of the Zambian team which qualified for the final, placing eighth overall.

He competed at the 2025 World Athletics Relays in China in the Men's 4 × 400 metres relay in May 2025. He subsequently ran at the 2025 World Athletics Championships in the men's 4 x 400 metres relay.
