= William Rayian =

Kenyan athlete

Personal information
- Nationality: Kenyan
- Born: 13 May 1994 (age 32)

Sport
- Sport: Track and Field
- Event: 400m
Medal record
Men's athletics
Representing Kenya
Commonwealth Games
Bronze medal – third place	2022 Birmingham	4 x 400m

William Rayian (born 13 May 1994) is a Kenyan athlete.

Rayian won a bronze medal as part of the Kenyan 4 × 400 m relay team at the 2022 Commonwealth Games.
