= Anthony Pesela =

Botswana sprinter (born 2002)

Personal information
- National team: Botswana
- Born: 9 June 2002 (age 24) Botswana

Sport
- Sport: Athletics
- Event: Sprinting

Achievements and titles
- Personal bests: 200 m: 21.05 (2021); 400 m: 44.58 (2021)
Medal record
Men's athletics
Representing Botswana
Olympic Games
| Silver medal – second place | 2024 Paris | 4×400 m |
African Championships
| Silver medal – second place | 2022 Mauritius | 4×400 m |
World U20 Championships
| Gold medal – first place | 2021 Nairobi | 400 m |
| Gold medal – first place | 2021 Nairobi | 4×400 m |

Anthony Pesela (born 9 June 2002) is a Botswana sprinter who specializes in the 400 metres. He was the gold medallist at the World Athletics U20 Championships in 2021.
