= Dubem Amene =

Nigerian sprinter

Personal information
- Born: 10 November 2002 (age 23) United States

Sport
- Sport: Athletics
- Event: 400 metres

Dubem Amene (born 10 November 2002) is a retired athlete who competed for Nigeria at local and international competitions.

== Career ==
Amene participated in the mixed 4 × 400 metres relay event at the 2020 Summer Olympics representing Nigeria. He also qualified for the semi-finals of the race.

Amene competed for the Michigan Wolverines track and field team in the NCAA. Amene alongside Samson Nathaniel and Imaobong Nse Uko finished sixth position in the men's mixed relay race at the 2022 World Athletics Championships in Oregon, United States.

He won the 400 meters race at the 2023 Big-10 championship in Geneva.

After participating in the Nigerian 4x400m relay team at the Paris 2024 Olympic Games, Amene announced his retirement from athletics.
