= Kennedy Luchembe =

Zambian athlete (born 2001)

Personal information
- Nationality: Zambian
- Born: 8 July 2001 (age 25)

Sport
- Sport: Athletics
- Event: Sprint

Achievements and titles
- Personal best: 400 m: 45.51 s (2021)
Medal record
Men's athletics
Representing Zambia
African Games
| Gold medal – first place | 2023 Accra | 4 × 400 m relay |
African Championships
| Silver medal – second place | 2022 Saint Pierre | 4 × 400 m relay |
| Bronze medal – third place | 2024 Douala | 4 × 400 m relay |
Summer Youth Olympics
| Silver medal – second place | 2018 Buenos Aires | 400 m |
Commonwealth Youth Games
| Gold medal – first place | 2017 Nassau | 400m |

Kennedy Luchembe (born 8 July 2001) is a Zambian sprinter. He ran as part of the Zambian men's 4 × 400 metres relay team which reached the final of the 2024 Summer Olympics.

== Biography ==
He was a silver medalist over 400 metres at the 2018 Summer Youth Olympics in Buenos Aires. He was awarded Junior Sportsman of the year 2019 at the Regional Annual Sports Awards (RASA).

He ran as a member of the Zambian 4 × 400 metres relay team won the silver medal at the 2022 African Championships in Port Louis, Mauritius.

He ran the 4 × 400 m relay at the 2022 Commonwealth Games in Birmingham, England. They came through the heats to qualify for the final, placing fifth overall. He also reached the semifinals of the individual 400 metres.

He won gold with the Zambian 4 × 400 m team at the delayed 2023 African Games in Accra, in a national record time of 2.59:12. That time proved to be enough for the team qualify for the 2024 Olympic Games by ranking.

He ran as part of the Zambian 4 × 400 m relay team at the 2024 World Relays Championships in Nassau, Bahamas.

He won bronze with the Zambian 4 × 400 m relay team at the 2024 African Championships in Athletics in Douala, Cameroon in June 2024.

He competed in the men's 4 × 400 m relay at the 2024 Summer Olympics in Paris as part of the Zambian team which qualified for the final, placing eighth overall.

He competed at the 2025 World Athletics Relays in China in the Men's 4 × 400 metres relay in May 2025. He subsequently ran at the 2025 World Athletics Championships in the men's 4 x 400 metres relay.

In July 2026, he was a semi-finalist in the 400 metres at the 2026 Commonwealth Games in Glasgow, Scotland. He also ran in the mixed 4 × 400 m relay at the Games.
