= Ifeanyi Emmanuel Ojeli =

Nigerian sprinter (born 1998)

Personal information
- Nationality: Nigerian
- Born: 10 October 1998 (age 27)

Sport
- Sport: Athletics
- Event: 400 metres
Medal record
Men's athletics
Representing Nigeria
African Games
Gold medal – first place	2023 Accra	Mixed 4x400 m relay
Bronze medal – third place	2023 Accra	4x400 m relay
African Championships
Silver medal – second place	2022 Saint Pierre	Mixed 4×400 m relay
Silver medal – second place	2024 Douala	Mixed 4×400 m relay
Bronze medal – third place	2022 Saint Pierre	4×400 m relay

Ifeanyi Emmanuel Ojeli (born 10 October 1998) is a Nigerian athlete. He competed in the mixed 4 × 400 metres relay event at the 2020 Summer Olympics.
