= Leungo Scotch =

Motswana sprinter (born 1996)

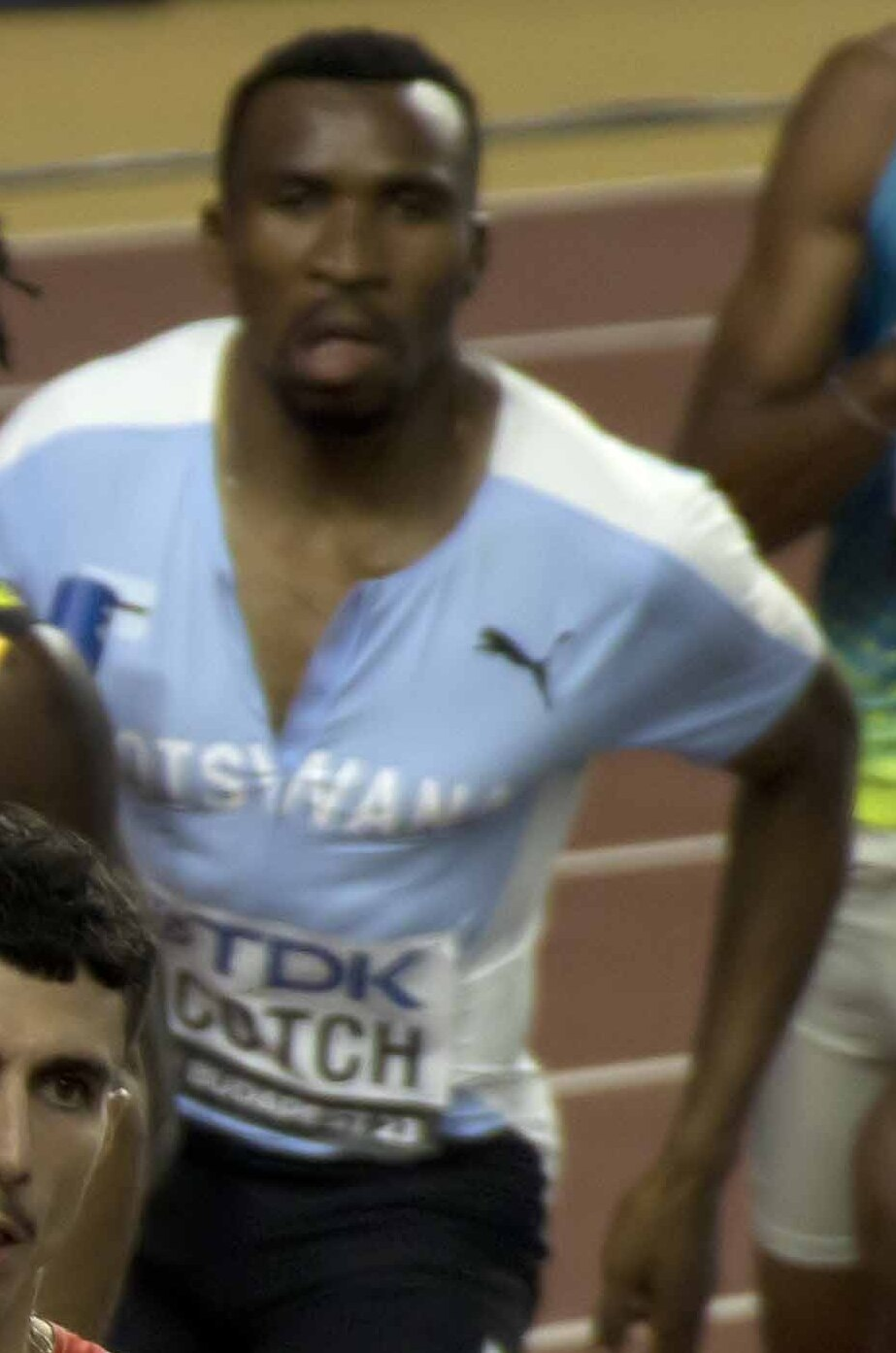
- Leungo Scotch in 2023

Personal information
- Born: 28 February 1996 (age 30)

Sport
- Country: Botswana
- Sport: Athletics
- Event: Sprinting
Medal record
Men's athletics
Representing Botswana
World Championships
Gold medal – first place	2025 Tokyo	4 × 400 m relay
Commonwealth Games
Silver medal – second place	2022 Birmingham	4 × 400 m relay
African Games
Gold medal – first place	2019 Rabat	400 m
Gold medal – first place	2019 Rabat	4 × 400 m relay
Silver medal – second place	2023 Accra	4 × 400 m relay
Silver medal – second place	2023 Accra	Mixed 4 × 400 m relay
African Championships
Gold medal – first place	2022 Saint Pierre	4 × 400 m relay
Gold medal – first place	2024 Douala	4 × 400 m relay
Bronze medal – third place	2024 Douala	Mixed 4 × 400 m relay
World Relays
Gold medal – first place	2024 Nassau	4 × 400 m relay
Bronze medal – third place	2025 Guangzhou	4 × 400 m relay
Bronze medal – third place	2021 Chorzów	4 × 400 m relay

Leungo Scotch (born 28 February 1996) is a Motswana sprinter.

He set a new personal best of 45.27s to win the men's 400 metres event at 2019 African Games in Rabat, Morocco.

On 21 September, Scotch was part of the Batswana team that won the 4 × 400 m relay at the 2025 World Athletic Championships in Tokyo.
