= 2024 World Athletics Relays =

Athletics competition in Nassau, Bahamas

- Host city: (The Bahamas) Nassau, Bahamas
- Events: 5
- Dates: 4-5 May 2024
- Main venue: Thomas Robinson Stadium

The 2024 World Athletics Relays was held in Nassau, Bahamas on 4 and 5 May 2024.

== Overview ==
The first 3 editions of the IAAF World Relays (former name) have been held in the same site: 2014 IAAF World Relays, 2015 IAAF World Relays and 2017 IAAF World Relays. Nassau won the bid against Lausanne in November 2022, in Rome.

The competition served as a qualifying event for the 2024 Summer Olympic Games from their respective NOCs, composed of the following:

- 14: top fourteen teams of each event based on their results achieved at the 2024 World Athletics Relays in Nassau, Bahamas.

The World Athletics Relays involved 32 national teams, in each relay event, and 20 races on both days of competition.

On Day 1, which will qualify 40 teams for the Summer Olympics, there was 20 heats across the five Olympic events (4 heats each for 4 × 100, 4 × 400, men, women and mixed); the top two teams from each heat directly qualified for the Games.

On Day 2, an additional 30 national teams were also qualified for the Games, through 15 repechage heats (the top 2 of each repechage qualified) and five finals, across those five events.

== Schedule ==
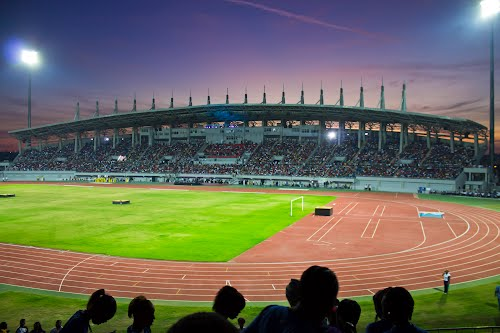
Tommy Robinson National Stadium, the venue.

Day 1 - Saturday, 4 May 2024
Time	Event	Round
18:00 EST	Mixed 4 × 400 m	Heats
18:45 EST	Women's 4 × 100 m	Heats
19:20 EST	Men's 4 × 100 m	Heats
19:55 EST	Women's 4 × 400 m	Heats
20:40 EST	Men's 4 × 400 m	Heats

Day 2 - Sunday, 5 May 2024
Time	Event	Round
18:00	Mixed 4 × 400 m	Repechage Round
18:35	Women's 4 × 100 m	Repechage Round
19:00	Men's 4 × 100 m	Repechage Round
19:25	Women's 4 × 400 m	Repechage Round
19:55	Men's 4 × 400 m	Repechage Round
20:25	Mixed 4 × 400 m	Final
20:35	Women's 4 × 100 m	Final
20:45	Men's 4 × 100 m	Final
20:55	Women's 4 × 400 m	Final
21:05	Men's 4 × 400 m	Final

== Medalists ==
Event	Gold		Silver		Bronze	
Men's 4 × 100 metres relay	United States; Courtney Lindsey; Kenneth Bednarek; Kyree King; Noah Lyles	37.40 WL	Canada; Brendon Rodney; Andre De Grasse; Aaron Brown; Jerome Blake	37.89 SB	France; Méba-Mickaël Zeze; Jeff Erius; Pablo Matéo; Aymeric Priam	38.44
Men's 4 × 400 metres relay	Botswana; Busang Kebinatshipi; Letsile Tebogo; Leungo Scotch; Bayapo Ndori	2:59.11 WL	South Africa; Gardeo Isaacs; Zakithi Nene; Antonie Matthys Nortje; Lythe Pillay	3:00.75	Belgium; Dylan Borlée; Robin Vanderbemden; Alexander Doom; Jonathan Sacoor	3:01.16
Women's 4 × 100 metres relay	United States; Tamari Davis; Gabrielle Thomas; Celera Barnes; Melissa Jefferson	41.85 CR, WL	France; Chloé Galet; Gémima Joseph; Helene Parisot; Mallory Leconte	42.75 SB	Great Britain; Alyson Bell; Amy Hunt; Bianca Williams; Aleeya Sibbons	42.80
Women's 4 × 400 metres relay	United States; Quanera Hayes; Gabrielle Thomas; Bailey Lear; Alexis Holmes	3:21.70 WL	Poland; Marika Popowicz-Drapała; Iga Baumgart-Witan; Justyna Święty-Ersetic; Natalia Kaczmarek	3:24.71	Canada; Zoe Sherar; Aiyanna Stiverne; Alyssa Marsh; Kyra Constantine	3:25.17 SB
Mixed 4 × 400 metres relay details	United States; Matthew Boling; Lynna Irby-Jackson; Willington Wright; Kendall Ellis	3:10.73 CR	Netherlands; Isayah Boers; Lieke Klaver; Isaya Klein Ikkink; Femke Bol	3:11.45 SB	Ireland; Cillin Greene; Rhasidat Adeleke; Thomas Barr; Sharlene Mawdsley	3:11.53 NR

== Medal table ==
Rank	Nation	Gold	Silver	Bronze	Total
1	United States (USA)	4	0	0	4
2	Botswana (BOT)	1	0	0	1
3	Canada (CAN)	0	1	1	2
3	France (FRA)	0	1	1	2
5	Netherlands (NED)	0	1	0	1
5	Poland (POL)	0	1	0	1
5	South Africa (RSA)	0	1	0	1
8	Belgium (BEL)	0	0	1	1
8	Great Britain (GBR)	0	0	1	1
8	Ireland (IRL)	0	0	1	1
Totals (10 entries)		5	5	5	15

== Team standings ==
Teams scored for every place in the top 8 with 8 points awarded for first place, 7 for second, etc.

The host country is highlighted in lavender blue

Rank	Nation	Points
1	United States	32
2	Great Britain	18
3	France	17
4	Canada	15
5	Japan	10
5	Netherlands	10
7	Botswana	8
7	Ireland	8
9	Germany	7
9	Italy	7
9	Poland	7
9	South Africa	7
