= Muhammad Ajmal Variyathodi =

Indian sprinter (born 1998)

Personal information
- Born: 1 June 1998 (age 28) Palakkad, Kerala, India
- Education: Mar Athanasius College of Engineering
- Military career
- Branch: Indian Navy
- Rank: Chief petty officer

Sport
- Sport: Athletics
- Event: 400 m

Achievements and titles
- Personal best: 45.36 (2023)
Medal record
Men's athletics
Representing India
Asian Games
Gold medal – first place	2022 Hangzhou	4×400m
Silver medal – second place	2022 Hangzhou	4×400m mixed
Asian Championships
Silver medal – second place	2023 Bangkok	4×400m

Muhammad Ajmal Variyathodi (born 1 June 1998) is an Indian sprinter who specializes in 400 m events.

== Career ==
At the 2022 Asian Games, Ajmal won gold medal in the 4 × 400 m relay and silver medal in the mixed 4 × 400 m relay.

At the 2023 Asian Championships, he won silver medal in the 4 × 400 m relay event. He also competed in the same event at the 2023 World Championships, reaching the final after having set an Asian record of 2:59.05 in the heats, the team ultimately finished sixth.
