= Samson Oghenewegba Nathaniel =

Nigerian sprinter (born 1997)

Personal information
- Nationality: Nigerian
- Born: 29 August 1997 (age 28)

Sport
- Sport: Athletics
- Event: 400 metres
Medal record
Men's athletics
Representing Nigeria
Gold medal – first place	2023 Accra	Mixed 4x400 m relay
Bronze medal – third place	2023 Accra	4x400 m relay

Samson Oghenewegba Nathaniel (born 29 August 1997) is a Nigerian athlete. He competed in the mixed 4 × 400 metres relay event at the 2020 Summer Olympics.
