= Zibane Ngozi =

Botswana sprinter (born 1992)

Personal information
- Nationality: Botswana
- Born: 31 October 1992 (age 33)

Sport
- Sport: Athletics
- Event: 400 metres
Medal record
Olympic Games
Bronze medal – third place	2020 Tokyo	4×400 m relay

Zibane Ngozi (born 31 October 1992) is a Botswana athlete. He competed in the men's 4 × 400 m relay event at the 2019 World Athletics Championships as well as in the men's 4 × 400 m relay event at the 2020 Summer Olympics, where he won the bronze medal.

In 2026, he was given a four-year ban from the sport for testing positive for a banned substance.
