= Sikiru Adeyemi =

Nigerian sprinter (born 1998)

Personal information
- Full name: Sikiru Adewale Adeyemi
- Nationality: Nigerian
- Born: 2 July 1998 (age 27)

Sport
- Sport: Athletics
- Event: 400 metres
Medal record
Men's athletics
Representing Nigeria
African Games
Gold medal – first place	2023 Accra	Mixed 4x400 m relay
Bronze medal – third place	2023 Accra	4x400 m relay
African Championships
Bronze medal – third place	2022 Saint Pierre	4×400 m relay

Sikiru Adewale Adeyemi(born 2 July 1998) is a Nigerian sprinter who specialises in the 4 × 400 metres relay.

== Achievements ==
Adeyemi participated in the men's 4 × 400 metres relay event at the 2022 Commonwealth Games representing Nigeria.

Adeyemi alongside Nse Imaobong, Patience Okon George and Nathaniel Samson ran a new minute of 18.53 seconds to qualify for the 2022 World Athletics Championships in Oregon, United States.

Adeyemi was also part of the team selected to represent Nigeria at the World Athletics Indoor Championships, Belgrade 22.
