= David Kapirante =

Kenyan sprinter

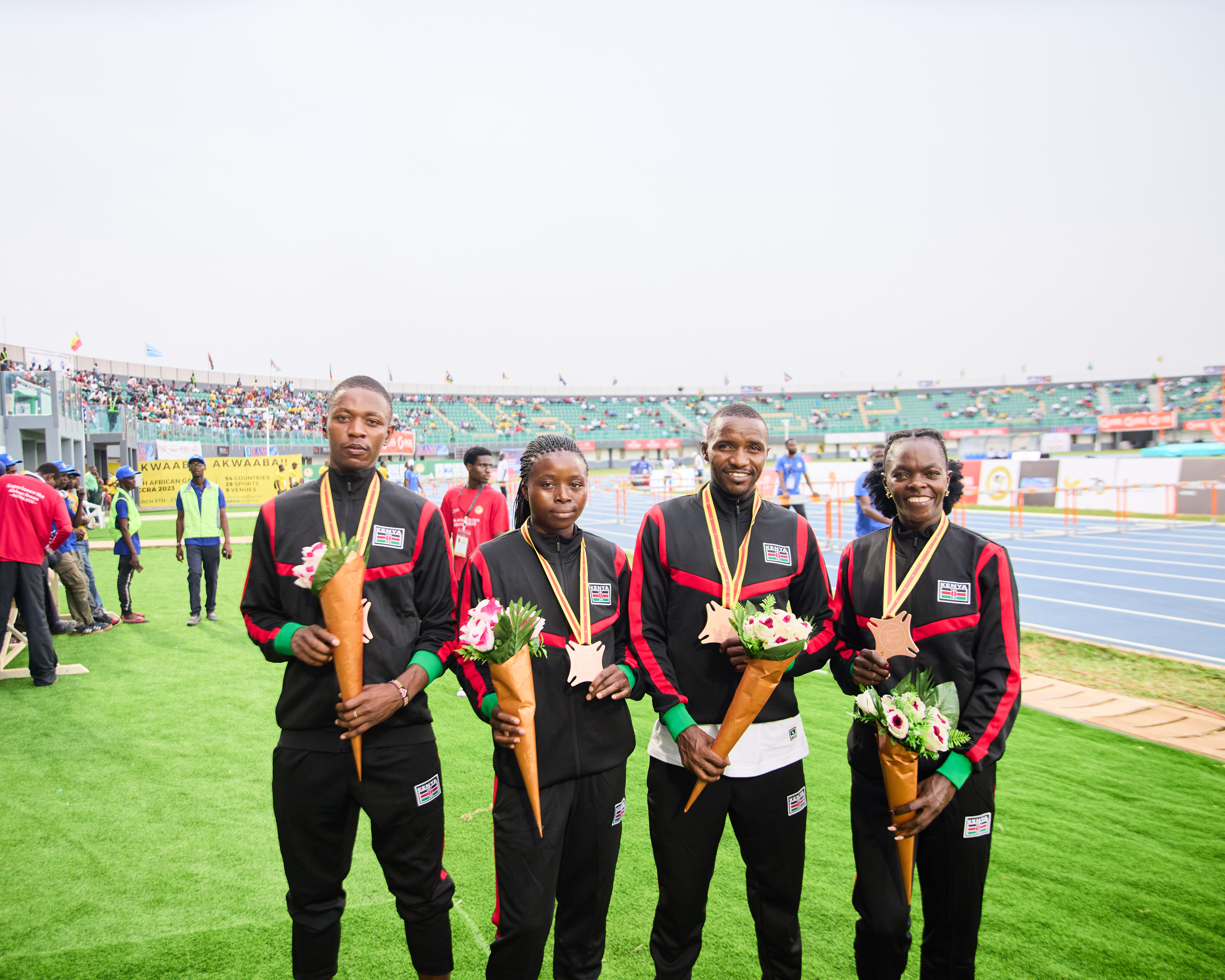
- At the African Games medal ceremony

Personal information
- Full name: David Sanayek Kapirante
- Born: 20 May 2000 (age 26)

Sport
- Sport: Athletics
- Event: Sprints
- Club: Kenya Prisons
Medal record
Men's athletics
Representing Kenya
African Games
Bronze medal – third place	2023 Accra	Mixed 4 × 400 m relay
African Championships
Silver medal – second place	2024 Douala	4×400 m relay
World Relays
Bronze medal – third place	2025 Guangzhou	Mixed 4 × 400 m relay

David Sanayek Kapirante (born 20 May 2000) is a Kenyan sprinter.

== Early and personal life ==
Born in Mashuru, Kajiado County, Sanayek hails from the Maasai people. He is one of six siblings (three boys and three girls). He attended Imaroro Primary School and competed in the 100m and 200m sprint distances. In 2013, at the National Championships, he caught the eye of athletics coach Barnabas Kitilit, who offered him a scholarship and took him to his Torongo Camp in Eldama Ravine and enrolled him at Kerobon High School in Nakuru.

== Career ==
In July 2017, he was a member of the Kenyan gold medal-winning mixed relay team at the World Under-18 Championship. From 2019, he began to be coached by Stephen Mwaniki with the Kenya Prisons team. In 2021, he represented Kenya at the 2021 World Athletics Relays in Poland.

In March 2024, he was a bronze medalist with the mixed 4 x 400 metres relay team at the delayed 2023 African Games in Accra, Ghana. In May 2024, he ran the anchor leg for the Kenyan men's 4 x 400 metres team at the 2024 World Athletics Relays in Nassau, Bahamas. In June 2024, he was a silver medalist with the men's 4 x 400 metres team and finished fourth with the Kenyan mixed 4 x 400 metres relay team, at the 2024 African Championships in Athletics in Douala, Cameroon.

In August 2024, he competed for Kenya at the 2024 Olympic Games in Paris, France in the mixed 4 x 400 metres relay, but the team did not qualify for the final.

He won a bronze medal with the Kenyan mixed 4 x 400 metres relay team at the 2025 World Athletics Relays in Guangzhou, China in May 2025. He was named in the Kenyan relay team for the 2025 World Athletics Championships, running in the men's 4 x 400 metres relay.
