= 2024 African Championships in Athletics – Women's 400 metres =

Women's 400 metres at the 2024 African Championships in Athletics
- Venue: Japoma Stadium
- Location: Douala, Cameroon
- Dates: 21 June (heats); 22 June (semi-finals); 23 June (final)
- Competitors: 28 from 15 nations
- Winning time: 51.16

Medalists
gold medal	Miranda Coetzee	South Africa
silver medal	Quincy Malekani	Zambia
bronze medal	Elizabeth Joseph	Nigeria

The women's 400 metres event at the 2024 African Championships in Athletics was held on 21, 22, and 23 June in Douala, Cameroon.

== Records ==
Records before the 2024 African Athletics Championships
Record	Athlete (nation)	Time (s)	Location	Date
World record	Marita Koch (GDR)	47.60	Canberra, Australia	6 October 1985
African record	Falilat Ogunkoya (NGR)	49.10	Atlanta, United States	29 July 1996
Championship record	Amantle Montsho (BOT)	49.54	Porto-Novo, Benin	29 June 2012
World leading	Sydney McLaughlin-Levrone (USA)	48.75	New York City, United States	9 June 2024
African leading	Mary Moraa (KEN)	50.56	Los Angeles, United States	18 May 2024

== Results ==
=== Heats ===
Qualification: First 3 of each heat (Q) and the next 4 fastest (q) qualified for the semifinals.

Rank	Heat	Name	Nationality	Time	Notes
1	3	Miranda Coetzee	South Africa	51.37	Q
2	4	Quincy Malekani	Zambia	52.31	Q
3	4	Rhodah Njobvu	Zambia	52.39	Q
4	1	Mercy Chebet	Kenya	52.45	Q
5	1	Lydia Jele	Botswana	52.52	Q
5	2	Shirley Nekhubui	South Africa	52.52	Q
7	3	Obakeng Kamberuka	Botswana	52.81	Q
8	4	Esther Elo Joseph	Nigeria	52.86	Q
9	3	Veronica Mutua	Kenya	53.07	Q
10	1	Elodie Malessara	Republic of the Congo	53.25	Q, NR
10	2	Leni Shida	Uganda	53.25	Q
12	3	Houda Nouiri	Morocco	53.68	q
13	4	Sara El Hachimi	Morocco	53.69	q
14	4	Fatou Gaye	Senegal	54.07	q
15	4	Joan Cherono	Kenya	54.46	q
16	2	Niddy Mingilishi	Zambia	55.24	Q
17	1	Alexia Stella Eyenga	Cameroon	55.27	
18	1	Hana Tadesse	Ethiopia	55.65	
18	2	Samira Awali Boubacar	Niger	55.65	
20	4	Marcelline Nkengue Ambombo	Cameroon	56.56	
21	1	Leopoldine Ye	Burkina Faso	56.59	
21	2	Salma Lhilali	Morocco	56.59	
23	1	Elos Divine Kandomba	Democratic Republic of the Congo	57.39	
23	2	Galefele Moroko	Botswana	57.39	
25	3	Napuumue Hengari	Namibia	58.07	
26	1	Kazatjo Kambiri	Namibia	58.25	
26	2	Angala Tuuliki	Namibia	58.25	
28	3	Awa Zongo	Burkina Faso	58.31	
	2	Lucia William Morris	South Sudan	DNS	
	3	Saran Hadja Kouyate	Guinea	DNS	
	3	Juliette Koudjoukalo Batchassi	Togo	DNS	

=== Semifinals ===
Qualification: First 3 of each semifinal (Q) and the next 2 fastest (q) qualified for the final.

Rank	Heat	Name	Nationality	Time	Notes
1	2	Miranda Coetzee	South Africa	50.91	Q
2	2	Esther Elo Joseph	Nigeria	52.26	Q
3	1	Quincy Malekani	Zambia	52.55	Q
4	2	Leni Shida	Uganda	52.70	Q
5	2	Niddy Mingilishi	Zambia	52.82	q
6	2	Lydia Jele	Botswana	52.84	q
7	1	Obakeng Kamberuka	Botswana	53.09	Q
8	1	Shirley Nekhubui	South Africa	53.22	Q
9	2	Rhodah Njobvu	Zambia	53.27	
10	1	Sara El Hachimi	Morocco	53.86	
11	1	Elodie Malessara	Republic of the Congo	54.03	
12	1	Fatou Gaye	Senegal	54.22	
13	2	Houda Nouiri	Morocco	54.92	
	1	Veronica Mutua	Kenya	DNS	
	1	Mercy Chebet	Kenya	DNS	
	2	Joan Cherono	Kenya	DNS	

=== Final ===
Rank	Lane	Athlete	Nationality	Time	Notes
1st place, gold medalist(s)	3	Miranda Coetzee	South Africa	51.16	
2nd place, silver medalist(s)	4	Quincy Malekani	Zambia	51.56	
3rd place, bronze medalist(s)	6	Esther Elo Joseph	Nigeria	51.94	
4	8	Shirley Nekhubui	South Africa	52.10	
5	1	Lydia Jele	Botswana	52.72	
6	5	Obakeng Kamberuka	Botswana	53.11	
7	7	Leni Shida	Uganda	53.50	
8	2	Niddy Mingilishi	Zambia	53.54	

== See also ==
- Athletics at the 2023 African Games – Women's 400 metres
