= 2022 African Championships in Athletics – Women's 400 metres =

The women's 400 metres event at the 2022 African Championships in Athletics was held on 8, 9 and 10 June in Port Louis, Mauritius.

== Medalists ==
Gold	Silver	Bronze
Miranda Coetzee; South Africa	Niddy Mingilishi; Zambia	Veronica Mutua; Kenya

== Results ==
=== Heats ===
Qualification: First 2 of each heat (Q) and the next 6 fastest (q) qualified for the semifinals.

Rank	Heat	Name	Nationality	Time	Notes
1	1	Miranda Coetzee	South Africa	52.11	Q
2	5	Patience Okon George	Nigeria	52.19	Q
3	5	Leni Shida	Uganda	52.68	Q
4	3	Veronica Mutua	Kenya	52.97	Q
5	1	Niddy Mingilishi	Zambia	53.21	Q
6	3	Asimenye Simwaka	Malawi	53.27	Q
7	3	Precious Molepo	South Africa	53.32	q
8	5	Lydia Jele	Botswana	53.40	q
9	3	Christine Botlogetswe	Botswana	54.02	q
10	5	Amarech Zago	Ethiopia	54.42	q
11	1	Tsige Duguma	Ethiopia	54.43	q
12	4	Praise Idamadudu	Nigeria	54.61	Q
13	2	Tlhomphang Basele	Botswana	54.66	Q
14	1	Jacinta Shikanda	Kenya	54.73	q
15	2	Marlie Viljoen	South Africa	54.99	Q
16	2	Abygirl Sepiso	Zambia	55.79	
17	5	Agness Mapula	Zambia	56.56	
18	4	Msgana Haylu	Ethiopia	56.86	Q
19	5	Cynthia Namahako Georges	Madagascar	57.25	
20	4	Nandi Vass	Namibia	58.73	
21	1	Mudi-Inosensia Haingura	Namibia	1:01.34	
22	2	Rose Ihisa Uwaro	ART	1:06.33	
	1	Linda Bulabula	Democratic Republic of the Congo	DNS	
	1	Samira Awali	Niger	DNS	
	2	Djénébou Danté	Mali	DNS	
	2	Plamedi Akonyi	Democratic Republic of the Congo	DNS	
	2	Jane Maiga	Democratic Republic of the Congo	DNS	
	3	Ella Onojuvwevwo	Nigeria	DNS	
	3	Cecilia Bouele Bondo	Republic of the Congo	DNS	
	4	Vimbai Maisvoreva	Zimbabwe	DNS	
	4	Deline Mpiti	South Africa	DNS	
	4	Latifa Ali	Ghana	DNS	

=== Semifinals ===
Qualification: First 3 of each semifinal (Q) and the next 2 fastest (q) qualified for the final.

Rank	Heat	Name	Nationality	Time	Notes
1	2	Miranda Coetzee	South Africa	52.85	Q
2	1	Patience Okon George	Nigeria	53.24	Q
3	1	Veronica Mutua	Kenya	53.80	Q
4	1	Niddy Mingilishi	Zambia	53.97	Q
5	1	Leni Shida	Uganda	54.05	q
6	2	Asimenye Simwaka	Malawi	54.28	Q
7	1	Precious Molepo	South Africa	54.29	q
8	2	Lydia Jele	Botswana	54.42	Q
9	2	Praise Idamadudu	Nigeria	54.44	
10	1	Christine Botlogetswe	Botswana	55.06	
11	2	Tlhomphang Basele	Botswana	55.90	
12	1	Tsige Duguma	Ethiopia	56.23	
13	2	Marlie Viljoen	South Africa	56.28	
14	2	Jacinta Shikanda	Kenya	56.78	
15	1	Msgana Haylu	Ethiopia	57.62	
16	2	Amarech Zago	Ethiopia	59.04	

=== Final ===
Rank	Lane	Athlete	Nationality	Time	Notes
1st place, gold medalist(s)	5	Miranda Coetzee	South Africa	51.82	
2nd place, silver medalist(s)	5	Niddy Mingilishi	Zambia	52.36	
3rd place, bronze medalist(s)	5	Veronica Mutua	Kenya	52.76	
4	5	Leni Shida	Uganda	52.91	
5	5	Patience Okon George	Nigeria	52.98	
6	5	Lydia Jele	Botswana	53.58	
7	5	Precious Molepo	South Africa	53.78	
8	5	Asimenye Simwaka	Malawi	53.86	
