= 2026 African Championships in Athletics – Women's 4 × 400 metres relay =

Women's 4 × 400 metres relay at the 2026 African Championships in Athletics
- Venue: Legon Sports Stadium
- Location: Accra, Ghana
- Dates: 17 May
- Winning time: 3:29.31

Medalists
gold medal	Esther Okon; Toheebat Jimoh; Jecinta Lawrence; Patience Okon George	Nigeria
silver medal	Derartu Anota; Banchalem Bikese; Banchiayehu Tesema; Ajayeba Aliye	Ethiopia
bronze medal	Diana Chepkemoi; Lillian Owako; Lanoline Aoko; Hellen Syombua	Kenya

The women's 4 × 400 metres relay event at the 2026 African Championships in Athletics was held on 17 May in Accra, Ghana.

== Results ==
Rank	Lane	Nation	Competitors	Time	Notes
1st place, gold medalist(s)	5	Nigeria	Esther Okon, Toheebat Jimoh, Jecinta Lawrence, Patience Okon George	3:29.31	
2nd place, silver medalist(s)	2	Ethiopia	Derartu Anota, Banchalem Bikese, Banchiayehu Tesema, Ajayeba Aliye	3:33.44	
3rd place, bronze medalist(s)	3	Kenya	Diana Chepkemoi, Lillian Owako, Lanoline Aoko, Hellen Syombua	3:33.80	
4	6	Ghana	, Portia Aboagye, , Florence Agyemang	3:35.63	
5	4	Botswana	Naledi Monthe, Kennekae Batisani, Katlego Kaisara, Obakeng Kamberuka	3:39.08	
