= 2024 African Championships in Athletics – Women's 4 × 400 metres relay =

Women's 4 × 400 metres relay at the 2024 African Championships in Athletics
- Venue: Japoma Stadium
- Location: Douala, Cameroon
- Dates: 26 June
- Nations: 6
- Winning time: 3:27.31 CR

Medalists
gold medal	Patience George; Esther Elo Joseph; Omolara Ogunmakinju; Ella Onojuvwewo	Nigeria
silver medal	Rhodah Njobvu; Niddy Mingilishi; Quincy Malekani; Abigail Sepiso	Zambia
bronze medal	Joan Cherono; Veronica Mutua; Esther Mbagari; Mercy Chebet	Kenya

The women's 4 × 400 metres relay event at the 2024 African Championships in Athletics was held on 26 June in Douala, Cameroon.

== Results ==
Rank	Lane	Nation	Competitors	Time	Notes
1st place, gold medalist(s)	2	Nigeria	Patience George, Esther Elo Joseph, Omolara Ogunmakinju, Ella Onojuvwewo	3:27.31	CR
2nd place, silver medalist(s)	7	Zambia	Rhodah Njobvu, Niddy Mingilishi, Quincy Malekani, Abigail Sepiso	3:32.18	
3rd place, bronze medalist(s)	6	Kenya	Joan Cherono, Veronica Mutua, Esther Mbagari, Mercy Chebet	3:32.65	
4	4	Botswana	Lydia Jele, Oratile Nowe, Kebonye Chikanyi Golekanye, Tshepang Manyika	3:33.13	
5	5	Cameroon	Irène Bell Bonong, Roline Tedega, Justice Tonno Ondobo, Stéphanie Njuh Nstella	3:43.75	
6	8	Senegal	Fatou Seck, Saphietou Diouf, Khoury Diagne, Fatou Gaye	3:44.28	
	1	Morocco		DNS	
	3	Ghana		DNS	

== See also ==
- Athletics at the 2023 African Games – Women's 4 × 400 metres relay
