= Athletics at the 2023 African Games – Women's 400 metres =

The women's 400 metres event at the 2023 African Games was held on 18, 19 and 20 March 2024 in Accra, Ghana.

== Medalists ==
Gold	Silver	Bronze
Mary Moraa; Kenya	Esther Joseph; Nigeria	Sita Sibiri; Burkina Faso

== Results ==
=== Heats ===
Qualification: First 3 in each heat (Q) and the next 6 fastest (q) advanced to the semifinals.

Rank	Heat	Name	Nationality	Time	Notes
1	3	Esther Joseph	Nigeria	51.81	Q
2	1	Rhodah Njobvu	Zambia	52.03	Q
3	5	Mary Moraa	Kenya	52.18	Q
4	3	Lydia Jele	Botswana	52.50	Q
5	2	Quincy Malekani	Zambia	52.63	Q
6	4	Samira Awal	Niger	53.07	Q
7	2	Sita Sibiri	Burkina Faso	53.10	Q, NR
8	4	Esther Okon	Nigeria	53.17	Q
9	1	Fatou Gaye	Senegal	53.26	Q
10	5	Asimenye Simwaka	Malawi	53.32	Q
11	5	Georgiana Sesay	Sierra Leone	53.35	Q
12	4	Leni Shida	Uganda	53.42	Q
13	5	Sara El Hachimi	Morocco	53.47	Q
14	2	Brittany Ogunmokun	Nigeria	53.53	Q
15	2	Marlie Viljoen	South Africa	53.67	Q
16	3	Elodie Malessara	Republic of the Congo	53.96	Q, NR
17	1	Jackline Najala	Kenya	54.11	Q
17	2	Tlhomphang Basele	Botswana	54.11	q
19	1	Salma Lhilali	Morocco	54.33	Q
20	5	Motlatsi Ranthe	Botswana	54.74	q
21	4	Bridget Annan	Ghana	54.94	Q
22	5	Tadelech Hote	Ethiopia	54.96	q
23	2	Grace Aduntira	Ghana	55.05	q
24	1	Marcelle Bouele Bondo	Republic of the Congo	55.23	
25	2	Marie Bangura	Sierra Leone	55.23	
26	1	Hana Tadesse	Ethiopia	55.53	
27	4	Julienne Koudjoukalo Batchassi	Togo	55.76	
28	3	Msanga Haylu	Ethiopia	56.09	Q
29	5	Angelique Strijdom	South Africa	56.27	
30	3	Sandrah Appiah	Ghana	56.60	
31	3	Souliath Saka	Benin	56.84	
32	4	Napuumue Hengari	Namibia	58.51	
	1	Imaobong Nse Uko	Nigeria	DNS	
	3	Nandi Vass	Namibia	DNS	

=== Semifinals ===
Qualification: First 2 in each semifinal (Q) and the next 2 fastest (q) advanced to the final.

Rank	Heat	Name	Nationality	Time	Notes
1	2	Mary Moraa	Kenya	51.55	Q
2	1	Esther Joseph	Nigeria	51.74	Q
3	1	Sita Sibiri	Burkina Faso	52.13	Q, NR
4	2	Quincy Malekani	Zambia	52.18	Q
5	1	Lydia Jele	Botswana	52.57	q
6	3	Rhodah Njobvu	Zambia	52.58	Q
7	3	Georgiana Sesay	Sierra Leone	52.62	Q
8	3	Samira Awal	Niger	52.84	q
9	3	Marlie Viljoen	South Africa	53.02	
10	2	Asimenye Simwaka	Malawi	53.14	
11	1	Leni Shida	Uganda	53.23	
12	1	Brittany Ogunmokun	Nigeria	53.26	
13	2	Sara El Hachimi	Morocco	53.37	
14	2	Fatou Gaye	Senegal	53.41	
15	3	Elodie Malessara	Republic of the Congo	53.77	NR
16	3	Esther Okon	Nigeria	53.80	
17	1	Grace Aduntira	Ghana	54.78	
18	1	Salma Lhilali	Morocco	54.94	
19	2	Jackline Najala	Kenya	54.99	
20	3	Tadelech Hote	Ethiopia	55.08	
21	1	Bridget Annan	Ghana	55.25	
22	2	Motlatsi Ranthe	Botswana	55.30	
23	3	Msanga Haylu	Ethiopia	56.70	
	2	Tlhomphang Basele	Botswana	DQ	TR16.8

=== Final ===
Rank	Lane	Name	Nationality	Time	Notes
1st place, gold medalist(s)	4	Mary Moraa	Kenya	50.57	WL
2nd place, silver medalist(s)	3	Esther Joseph	Nigeria	51.61	
3rd place, bronze medalist(s)	5	Sita Sibiri	Burkina Faso	51.74	NR
4	6	Rhodah Njobvu	Zambia	51.97	
5	7	Quincy Malekani	Zambia	51.98	
6	2	Georgiana Sesay	Sierra Leone	52.49	
7	8	Lydia Jele	Botswana	53.05	
8	1	Samira Awal	Niger	53.18	
