= 2022 African Championships in Athletics – Mixed 4 × 400 metres relay =

The mixed 4 × 400 metres relay event at the 2022 African Championships in Athletics was held on 9 June in Port Louis, Mauritius. It was the first time that a mixed event was contested at the African Championships.

== Results ==
Rank	Lane	Nation	Competitors	Time	Notes
1st place, gold medalist(s)	3	Botswana	Busang Collen Kebinatshipi, Motlatsi Rante, Maitseo Keitumetse, Christine Botlogetswe	3:21.85	
2nd place, silver medalist(s)	4	Nigeria	Emmanuel Ojeli, Ella Onojuvwewo, Ayo Adeola, Patience Okon George	3:22.38	
3rd place, bronze medalist(s)	5	Kenya	Collins Omae, William Rayan, Veronica Mutua, Jarinter Mwasya	3:22.75	
4	6	South Africa	Sabelo Dhlamini, Taylon Bieldt, Gardeo Isaacs, Shirley Nekhubui	3:23.06	
5	2	Zambia	David Mulenga, Abygirl Sepiso, Daniel Mbewe, Rhoda Njobvu	3:27.06	
6	7	Ethiopia	Eriema Kere, Amarech Zago, Yohannes Tefera, Tsige Duguma	3:31.50	
	8	Gambia	Edrissa Marong, Fatou Sanneh, Modou Sanneh, Jawneh Nyimasata	DQ	
	1	Madagascar		DNS	
