= Omolara Ogunmakinju =

Nigerian sprinter (born 1993)

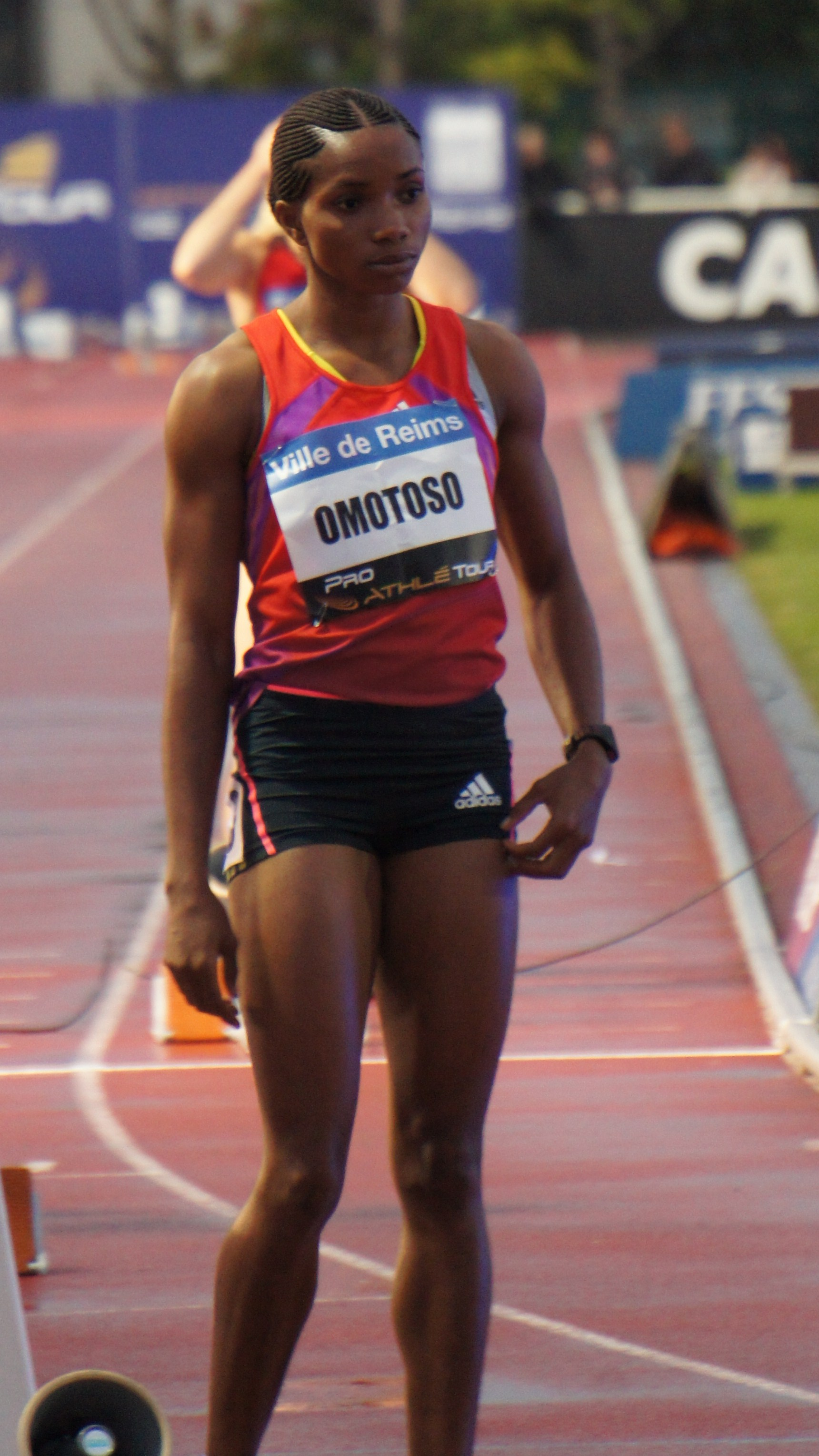
- Ogunmakinju in 2013

Personal information
- Born: Omolara Omotosho; 25 May 1993 (age 33) Akure, Nigeria
- Height: 1.52 m (5 ft 0 in)
- Weight: 50 kg (110 lb)

Sport
- Country: Nigeria
- Sport: Athletics
- Event: 4 × 400m Relay
Medal record
Women's athletics
Representing Nigeria
Commonwealth Games
Silver medal – second place	2014 Glasgow	4x400 m relay
African Games
Gold medal – first place	2011 Maputo	4x400 m relay
Gold medal – first place	2023 Accra	4x400 m relay
Gold medal – first place	2023 Accra	Mixed 4x400 m relay
African Championships
Gold medal – first place	2012 Porto-Novo	4x400 m relay
Gold medal – first place	2024 Douala	4×400 m relay
Silver medal – second place	2016 Durban	4x400 m relay

Omolara Ogunmakinju (born 25 May 1993) is a Nigerian sprinter who specializes in the 400 metres. She represented Nigeria at the 2012 Summer Olympics.

Her personal best in the event is 51.28 seconds (Calabar 2012).

== Competition record ==
Year	Competition	Venue	Position	Event	Notes
Representing Nigeria
2011	World Championships	Daegu, South Korea	7th	4 × 400 m relay	3:29.82
2011	All-Africa Games	Maputo, Mozambique	8th	400 m	53.19
2012	African Championships	Porto-Novo, Benin	1st	4 × 400 m relay	3:28.77
2012	Olympic Games	London, United Kingdom	13th (sf)	400 m	51.41
2012	Olympic Games	London, United Kingdom	8th (h)	4 × 400 m relay	3:26.29^{1}
2013	World Championships	Moscow, Russia	21st (sf)	400 m	52.38
2013	World Championships	Moscow, Russia	6th	4 × 400 m relay	3:27.57
2014	World Indoor Championships	Sopot, Poland	6th	4 × 400 m relay	3:31.59
2014	IAAF World Relays	Nassau, Bahamas	3rd	4 × 400 m relay	3:23.41
2014	Commonwealth Games	Glasgow, United Kingdom	8th (sf)	400 m	52.34
2014	Commonwealth Games	Glasgow, United Kingdom	2nd (h)	4 × 400 m relay	3:28.28
2015	Universiade	Gwangju, South Korea	20th (h)	200 m	24.45^{2}
2016	Olympic Games	Rio de Janeiro, Brazil	46th (h)	400 m	53.22
2024	African Games	Accra, Ghana	1st	4 × 400 m relay	3:27.29
2024	African Championships	Douala, Cameroon	1st	4 × 400 m relay	3:27.31

^{1} Disqualified in the final.
^{2} Disqualified in the semifinals.
