= 2022 African Championships in Athletics – Women's 200 metres =

The women's 200 metres event at the 2022 African Championships in Athletics was held on 11 and 12 June in Port Louis, Mauritius.

== Medalists ==
Gold	Silver	Bronze
Aminatou Seyni; Niger	Maximila Imali; Kenya	Rhoda Njobvu; Zambia

== Results ==
=== Heats ===
Held on 11 June

Qualification: First 2 of each heat (Q) and the next 6 fastest (q) qualified for the semifinals.

Wind:
Heat 1: +3.0 m/s, Heat 2: +2.1 m/s, Heat 3: +3.2 m/s, Heat 4: +0.9 m/s, Heat 5: +2.4 m/s

Rank	Heat	Name	Nationality	Time	Notes
1	3	Aminatou Seyni	Niger	22.62	Q
2	3	Tima Godbless	Nigeria	22.99	Q
3	5	Quincy Malekani	Zambia	23.22	Q
4	3	Lumeka Katundu	Zambia	23.31	q
5	4	Maboundou Koné	Ivory Coast	23.35	Q
6	1	Shirley Nekhubui	South Africa	23.40	Q
7	4	Praise Idamadudu	Nigeria	23.48	Q
8	5	Jacent Nyamahunge	Uganda	23.53	Q
9	5	Maximila Imali	Kenya	23.54	q
10	1	Natacha Ngoye Akamabi	Republic of the Congo	23.55	Q
11	2	Rhoda Njobvu	Zambia	23.55	Q
12	2	Banele Shabangu	South Africa	23.68	Q
13	3	Milcent Ndoro	Kenya	23.76	q
14	5	Tamzin Thomas	South Africa	23.86	q
15	5	Anè Rautenbach	Namibia	23.92	q
16	3	Asimenye Simwaka	Malawi	23.97	q
17	2	Baytula Alayu	Ethiopia	24.00	
18	2	Loungo Matlhaku	Botswana	24.19	
19	1	Boitshepiso Kelapile	Botswana	24.47	
20	5	Maimuna Jallow	Gambia	24.57	
21	3	Madina Touré	Burkina Faso	24.63	
22	4	Eunice Murandafu	Kenya	24.68	
23	2	Karel Elodie Ziketh	Ivory Coast	24.70	
24	1	Cynthia Namahako Georges	Madagascar	24.71	
25	4	Amelie Anthony	Mauritius	24.78	
26	5	Bonguwe Mahlalela	Eswatini	24.83	
27	1	Pierrick Linda Moulin	Gabon	24.87	
28	4	Astrid van Hoorn	Mozambique	25.00	
29	4	Akouvi Koumedzina	Togo	25.07	
30	2	Samira Awali	Niger	25.50	
31	4	Winnie Sarefo	Botswana	25.67	
32	4	Lucia Moris	South Sudan	26.00	
33	1	Beatrice Midomide	Benin	26.50	
	1	Linda Angounou	Cameroon	DNS	
	1	Gina Bass	Gambia	DNS	
	2	Nyimasata Jawneh	Gambia	DNS	
	3	Ebony Morrison	Liberia	DNS	

=== Semifinals ===
Held on 11 June

Qualification: First 3 of each semifinal (Q) and the next 2 fastest (q) qualified for the final.

Wind:
Heat 1: +4.6 m/s, Heat 2: +4.7 m/s

Rank	Heat	Name	Nationality	Time	Notes
1	2	Aminatou Seyni	Niger	22.78	Q
2	2	Natacha Ngoye Akamabi	Republic of the Congo	23.01	Q
3	2	Maximila Imali	Kenya	23.10	Q
4	1	Lumeka Katundu	Zambia	23.26	Q
5	1	Maboundou Koné	Ivory Coast	23.30	Q
6	2	Shirley Nekhubui	South Africa	23.33	q
7	1	Quincy Malekani	Zambia	23.35	Q
8	2	Rhoda Njobvu	Zambia	23.44	q
9	1	Banele Shabangu	South Africa	23.46	
10	1	Tima Godbless	Nigeria	23.55	
11	2	Praise Idamadudu	Nigeria	23.58	
12	2	Jacent Nyamahunge	Uganda	23.69	
13	1	Tamzin Thomas	South Africa	23.85	
14	1	Milcent Ndoro	Kenya	24.01	
15	1	Anè Rautenbach	Namibia	24.24	
16	2	Asimenye Simwaka	Malawi	24.25	

=== Final ===
Held on 12 June

Wind: +0.4 m/s

Rank	Lane	Athlete	Nationality	Time	Notes
1st place, gold medalist(s)	5	Aminatou Seyni	Niger	23.04	
2nd place, silver medalist(s)	7	Maximila Imali	Kenya	23.43	
3rd place, bronze medalist(s)	2	Rhoda Njobvu	Zambia	23.51	
4	4	Maboundou Koné	Ivory Coast	23.62	
5	8	Quincy Malekani	Zambia	23.63	
6	3	Lumeka Katundu	Zambia	23.64	
7	1	Shirley Nekhubui	South Africa	23.72	
8	6	Natacha Ngoye Akamabi	Republic of the Congo	24.45	
