= 2026 African Championships in Athletics – Women's 400 metres =

Women's 400 metres at the 2026 African Championships in Athletics
- Venue: Legon Sports Stadium
- Location: Accra, Ghana
- Dates: 12–14 May
- Competitors: 32 from 19 nations
- Winning time: 51.54

Medalists
gold medal	Ajayeba Aliye	Ethiopia
silver medal	Obakeng Kamberuk	Botswana
bronze medal	Florence Agyeman	Ghana

The women's 400 metres event at the 2026 African Championships in Athletics was held on 12, 13 and 14 May in Accra, Ghana.

== Results ==
=== Heats ===
First 4 of each heat (Q) and the next 4 fastest (q) qualified for the semifinals.

Rank	Heat	Athlete	Nationality	Time	Notes
1	2	Ajayeba Aliye	Ethiopia	52.03	Q
2	1	Marlie Viljoen	South Africa	52.21	Q
3	4	Obakeng Kamberuka	Botswana	52.27	Q
4	2	Florence Agyeman	Ghana	52.41	Q
5	1	Esther Okon	Nigeria	52.42	Q
6	5	Bassant Hemida	Egypt	52.70	Q
7	4	Elodie Malessara	Republic of the Congo	52.93	Q
8	3	Mercy Chebet	Kenya	53.05	Q
9	2	Mamakoli Senauoane	Lesotho	53.14	Q
10	1	Monica Akullu	Uganda	53.32	Q
11	1	Lanoline Aoko	Kenya	53.50	Q
12	5	Sita Sibiri	Burkina Faso	53.73	Q
13	4	Niddy Mingilishi	Zambia	53.74	Q
14	3	Kennekae Batisani	Botswana	53.81	Q
15	3	Mauren Akiiki Banura	Uganda	53.82	Q
16	4	Jecinta Lawrence	Nigeria	53.96	Q
17	2	Leni Shida	Uganda	54.00	Q
18	3	Portia Aboagye	Ghana	54.01	Q
19	4	Hellen Syombua Kalii	Kenya	54.13	q
20	1	Genet Ayele	Ethiopia	54.36	q
21	2	Naledi Monthe	Botswana	54.88	q
22	2	Josée Juanelle Amoussou	Gabon	54.92	q
23	4	Angala Tuuliki	Namibia	54.97	
24	5	Banchalem Bikese	Ethiopia	55.55	Q
25	1	Portia Nkrumah	Ghana	55.59	
26	3	Emeldah Kapunjila	Zambia	55.70	
26	4	Salamatou Halidou Hassane	Niger	55.70	
28	2	Elos Devine Kandomba	Democratic Republic of the Congo	55.91	
29	5	Abygirl Sepiso	Zambia	56.48	Q
30	5	Anesu Nyahuma	Zimbabwe	56.94	
31	3	Sainey Kijera	Gambia	57.62	
32	1	Esther Mayadjim Mingueyam	Chad	57.69	
	3	Ella Klahdawa	Ivory Coast	DNS	
	4	Asimenye Simwaka	Malawi	DNS	
	5	Emmy Hosea Saulo	Tanzania	DNS	
	5	Treasure Ngozi Okereke	Nigeria	DNS	
	5	Josée Juanelle Amoussou	Gabon	DNS	

=== Semifinals ===
First 2 of each heat (Q) and the next 2 fastest (q) qualified for the final.

Rank	Heat	Athlete	Nationality	Time	Notes
1	1	Ajayeba Aliye	Ethiopia	51.37	Q, NR
2	1	Bassant Hemida	Egypt	51.86	Q
3	1	Sita Sibiri	Burkina Faso	51.86	q
4	3	Obakeng Kamberuka	Botswana	52.13	Q
5	2	Marlie Viljoen	South Africa	52.14	Q
6	2	Elodie Malessara	Republic of the Congo	52.35	Q
7	3	Florence Agyeman	Ghana	52.43	Q
8	2	Mercy Chebet	Kenya	52.78	q
9	1	Portia Aboagye	Ghana	53.00	
10	3	Esther Okon	Nigeria	53.06	
11	1	Jecinta Lawrence	Nigeria	53.17	
12	1	Lanoline Aoko	Kenya	53.32	
13	2	Mauren Akiiki Banura	Uganda	53.47	
14	1	Kennekae Batisani	Botswana	53.48	
15	2	Mamakoli Senauoane	Lesotho	53.55	
16	2	Naledi Monthe	Botswana	54.09	
17	3	Monica Akullu	Uganda	54.21	
18	1	Hellen Syombua Kalii	Kenya	54.82	
19	3	Niddy Mingilishi	Zambia	54.87	
20	3	Genet Ayele	Ethiopia	54.92	
21	2	Banchalem Bikese	Ethiopia	55.40	
	3	Leni Shida	Uganda	DNS	
	?	Abygirl Sepiso	Zambia	DNS	

=== Final ===
Rank	Heat	Athlete	Nationality	Time	Notes
1st place, gold medalist(s)	6	Ajayeba Aliye	Ethiopia	51.54	
2nd place, silver medalist(s)	7	Obakeng Kamberuka	Botswana	51.79	
3rd place, bronze medalist(s)	8	Florence Agyeman	Ghana	51.87	
4	4	Bassant Hemida	Egypt	52.00	
5	5	Marlie Viljoen	South Africa	52.41	
6	3	Elodie Malessara	Republic of the Congo	52.97	
7	2	Sita Sibiri	Burkina Faso	53.65	
8	1	Mercy Chebet	Kenya	53.68	
