= Athletics at the 2022 Commonwealth Games – Women's 4 × 400 metres relay =

Women's 4 × 400 metres relay at the 2022 Commonwealth Games
- Venue: Alexander Stadium
- Dates: 7 August
- Competitors: 32 from 8 nations
- Winning time: 3:25.84

Medalists
gold medal	Natassha McDonald; Aiyanna Stiverne; Micha Powell; Kyra Constantine	Canada
silver medal	Shiann Salmon; Junelle Bromfield; Roneisha McGregor; Natoya Goule	Jamaica
bronze medal	Zoey Clark; Beth Dobbin; Jill Cherry; Nicole Yeargin	Scotland

The women's 4 × 400 metres relay at the 2022 Commonwealth Games, as part of the athletics programme, took place in the Alexander Stadium on 7 August 2022.

== Records ==
Prior to this competition, the existing world and Games records were as follows:

World record	Soviet Union (Tatyana Ledovskaya, Olga Nazarova, Mariya Pinigina, Olga Bryzhina)	3:15.17	Seoul, South Korea	1 October 1988
Commonwealth record	Jamaica (Rosemarie Whyte, Davita Prendergast, Novlene Williams-Mills, Shericka Williams)	3:18.71	Daegu, South Korea	3 September 2011
Games record	Jamaica (Stephenie Ann McPherson, Christine Day, Novlene Williams-Mills, Anastasia Le-Roy)	3:23.82	Glasgow, Scotland	2 August 2014

== Schedule ==
The schedule was as follows:

Date	Time	Round
Sunday 7 August 2022	21:40	Final

All times are British Summer Time (UTC+1)

== Results ==
=== Final ===
The medals were determined in the final. Although England beat Canada in a photo-finish by 0.01 second, it was found that England's Jodie Williams had intruded into an inner lane during the handover from Victoria Ohuruogu, and the gold was awarded to Canada, which was only revealed after England had already run a victory lap.

Rank	Lane	Nation	Athletes	Time	Notes
1st place, gold medalist(s)	5	Canada	Natassha McDonald, Aiyanna Stiverne, Micha Powell, Kyra Constantine	3:25.84	
2nd place, silver medalist(s)	8	Jamaica	Shiann Salmon, Junelle Bromfield, Roneisha McGregor, Natoya Goule	3:26.93	
3rd place, bronze medalist(s)	9	Scotland	Zoey Clark, Beth Dobbin, Jill Cherry, Nicole Yeargin	3:30.15	SB
4	6	South Africa	Miranda Coetzee, Taylon Bieldt, Shirley Nekhubui, Zenéy van der Walt	3:30.25	
5	4	Kenya	Millicent Ndoro, Jarinter Mwasya, Veronica Kamumbe Mutua, Mary Moraa	3:32.28	SB
6	7	Nigeria	Amarachukwu Obi, Ella Onojuvwevwo, Patience Omovoh, Patience Okon George	3:33.13	
7	2	Botswana	Lydia Jele, Thomphang Basele, Motlatsi Rante, Christine Botlogetswe	3:41.14	
	3	England	Victoria Ohuruogu, Jodie Williams, Ama Pipi, Jessie Knight	DQ	TR 17.3.1 (3:25.83)
