= Collen Kebinatshipi =

Botswana athlete (born 2004)

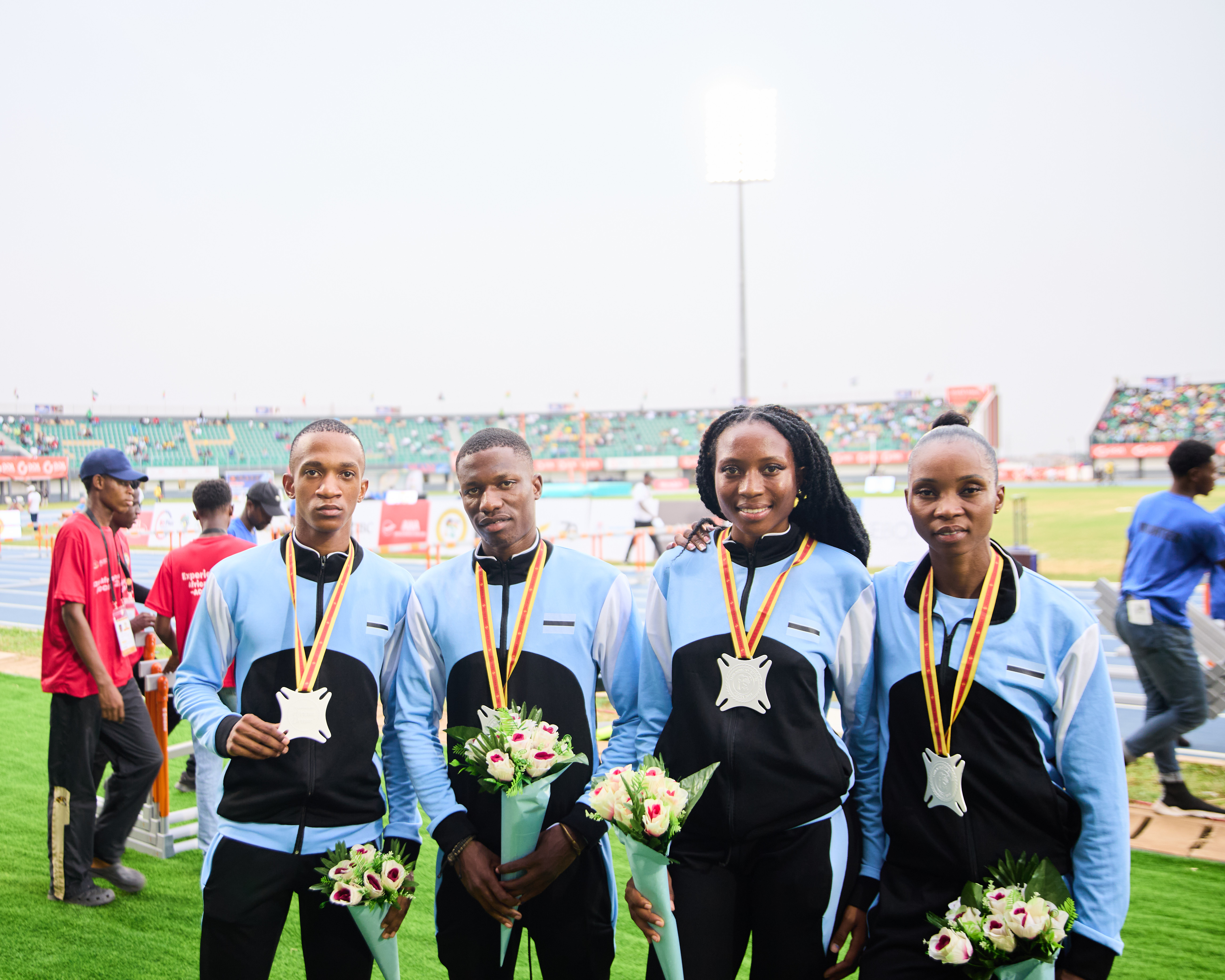
- Kebinatshipi at the 2023 African Games

Personal information
- Full name: Busang Collen Kebinatshipi
- Nationality: Botswana
- Born: 13 February 2004 (age 22) Hukuntsi, Botswana
- Height: 1.71 m (5 ft 7 in)

Sport
- Sport: Athletics
- Events: 400 m, 200 m, 100 m

Achievements and titles
- Personal bests: 100 m: 9.89 (Gaborone, 2026); 200 m: 20.08 (Gaborone, 2025); 400 m: 43.39 (Budapest, 2026) NR
Medal record
Men's athletics
Representing Botswana
Olympic Games
Silver medal – second place	2024 Paris	4 × 400 m relay
World Championships
Gold medal – first place	2025 Tokyo	400 m
Gold medal – first place	2025 Tokyo	4 × 400 m relay
World Ultimate Championship
First place	2026 Budapest	400 m
Diamond League
First place	2026 Brussels	400 m
World Relays
Gold medal – first place	2024 Nassau	4 × 400 m relay
Gold medal – first place	2026 Gaborone	4 × 400 m relay
African Games
Silver medal – second place	2023 Accra	4 × 400 m relay
Silver medal – second place	2023 Accra	Mixed 4 × 400 m relay
African Championships
Gold medal – first place	2022 Saint Pierre	4 × 400 m relay
Gold medal – first place	2022 Saint Pierre	Mixed 4 × 400 m relay
Gold medal – first place	2024 Douala	4 × 400 m relay
World U20 Championships
Gold medal – first place	2021 Nairobi	4 × 400 m relay
African U20 Championships
Gold medal – first place	2023 Ndola	400 m
Gold medal – first place	2023 Ndola	4 × 400 m relay

Busang Collen Kebinatshipi (born 13 February 2004) is a track and field athlete from Botswana. He is the reigning World Champion in the 400 metres, having won the title at the 2025 World Athletics Championships. He also ran the anchor leg as Botswana won in the men's 4 × 400 relay at the championships. He placed second in the men's 4 × 400 metres relay at the 2024 Olympic Games.

== Biography ==
=== Junior athlete and senior debut ===
Kebinatshipi was part of the Botswana men's 4 × 400 m relay team that won at the 2021 World Athletics U20 Championships in Nairobi. In April 2022, he lowered his personal best for the 400 metres to 45.20 seconds. In August 2022, he won as part of the Botswana men's 4 × 400 m relay team and the mixed 4 × 400 m relay team at the 2022 African Championships.

He won the 400 m at the 2023 African U18 and U20 Championships in Athletics in Ndola, Zambia, in April 2023, running a championship record time of 44.91 seconds. In June 2023, he ran 45.01 to win an international meeting in Hengelo, Netherlands beating an international field, including the likes of Vernon Norwood and Zakithi Nene.

Competing at the 2023 World Athletics Championships in Budapest, he lowered his personal best in the 400 metres to 44.80 to qualify for the semi-final.

=== 2024: Olympic medalist ===
He ran as part of the victorious Botswanan 4 × 400 m relay team which qualified for the 2024 Paris Olympics at the 2024 World Relays Championships in Nassau, Bahamas.

He competed at the 2024 Summer Olympics over 400 metres in August 2024, running a personal best time to reach the semi-finals. He also competed in the men's 4 × 400 m relay at the Games, winning the silver medal with the Botswana relay team.

=== 2025: World Champion ===
He ran 44.53 seconds to finish third in the 400 metres at the 2025 Xiamen Diamond League event in China, in April 2025. He also finished third in the 400 metres at the 2025 Shanghai Diamond League event in China on 3 May 2025, in a time of 44.63 seconds. He ran 44.51 seconds the place third in the 400 metres at the Diamond League event at the 2025 Golden Gala in Rome on 6 June 2025.

In April 2025, Kebinatshipi finished second in the 200 metres event at the FNB Botswana Golden Grand Prix, which qualified him for the World Championships. In July 2025, he placed second over 200 metres in the men's U23 race at the 2025 Herculis, behind race winner Gout Gout, running 20.28 seconds. He placed seventh over 400 metres at the Diamond League Final in Zurich on 28 August.

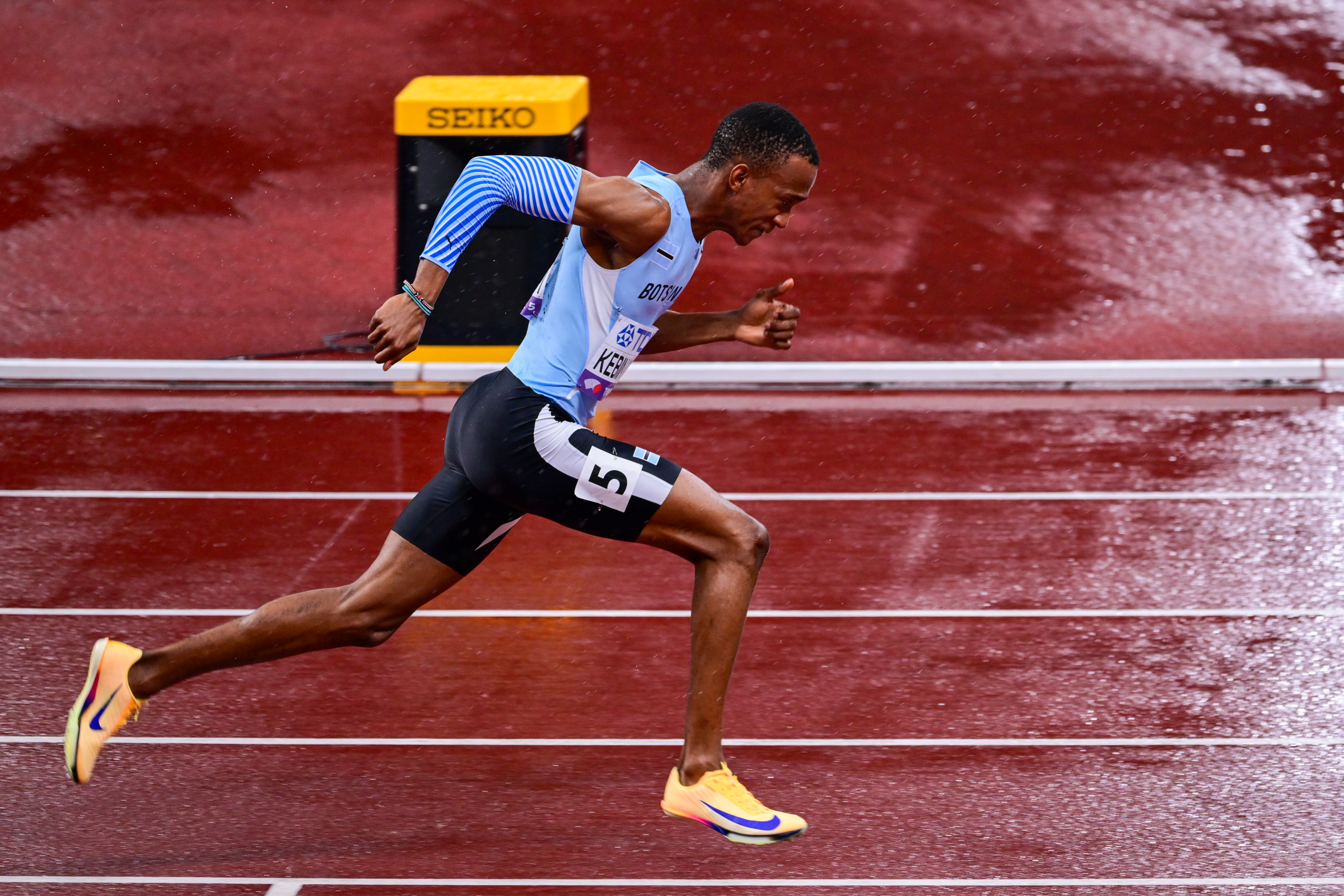
Kebinatshipi competing at the 2025 World Athletics Championships

In September 2025, he became the world champion over 400 metres competing at the World Athletics Championships in Tokyo, Japan. He ran a season's best 44.48 seconds to qualify for the semi-finals, before winning his semi-final in a personal best 43.61 seconds. The final he won in another personal best and Botswana national record of 43.53 seconds. He later won a gold medal as part of the Botswana team in the men's 4 × 400 metres relay.

=== 2026: Diamond League record holder, Ultimate champion ===
Kebinatshipi ran 44.55 seconds in his first 400 m race of the year in March 2026, also running a wind-assisted 100 m time of 9.75 seconds that month. In April 2026, he ran 9.89 seconds for the 100 metres in both the semi-final (0.8 m/s) and in winning the final (1.2 m/s) of the Botswana Championships. In doing so, he became only the fourth man in history to break 44 seconds for 400 m and the 10-second barrier in the 100 m, after Wayde van Niekerk, Michael Norman and Fred Kerley.

Competing at the 2026 World Athletics Relays in Gaborone, he ran in the final of the men's 4 × 400 m relay as the Botswana team ran a championship and national record of 2:54.47 to win the gold medal and move to third on the world all-time list. On 23 May, he secured the first Diamond League win of his career, running a meeting record of 43.92 at the 2026 Xiamen Diamond League. On 28 June, Kebinatshipi broke the Diamond League record with 43.54 to win the 400 metres at the 2026 Meeting de Paris. On 4 July, he ran 44.00 to win at the 2026 Prefontaine Classic. On 10 July, he ran a national record of 43.44 to improve his own Diamond League record and move to joint-sixth on the world all-time list at the 2026 Herculis Diamond League event in Monaco. On 23 August, he ran 43.59 seconds to win in the Diamond League over 400 m at the 2026 Kamila Skolimowska Memorial in Silesia, Poland. On 4 September, Kebinatshipi won the 400 m at the 2026 Diamond League Final in Brussels with a time of 43.40 seconds, improving on his Diamond League record and tying Quincy Hall for 5th fastest all time in the event. The following week, he ran a new national record 43.39 seconds to win the inaugural World Ultimate Championship in Budapest. With the win, Kebinatshipi capped an unbeaten season in the 400 metres.

== Statistics ==
Grand Slam Track results
Slam	Race group	Event	Pl.	Time	Prize money
2025 Kingston Slam	Long sprints	400 m	4th	45.15	US$15,000
2025 Kingston Slam	Long sprints	200 m	6th	21.08	US$15,000
