= 2021 World Athletics U20 Championships – Men's 4 × 400 metres relay =

Men's 4 × 400 metres relay at the 2021 World Athletics U20 Championships
- Venue: Kasarani Stadium
- Dates: 21–22 August
- Competitors: 48 from 11 nations
- Winning time: 3:05.22

Medalists
gold medal	Busang Collen Kebinatshipi; Anthony Pesela; Oreeditse Masede; Phenyo Bongani Majama; Thusoyaone Gabanatlhong	Botswana
silver medal	Malachi Johnson; Jeremy Bembridge; Tahj Hamm; Devontie Archer; Antonio Hanson	Jamaica
bronze medal	Joshua Wanyonyi; Elkanah Kiprotich Chemelil; Kennedy Kimeu; Peter Kithome	Kenya

The men's 4 × 400 metres relay at the 2021 World Athletics U20 Championships was held at the Kasarani Stadium on 21 and 22 August.

== Records ==
Standing records prior to the 2021 World Athletics U20 Championships
World U20 Record	United States	3:00.33	Trujillo, Peru	23 July 2017
Championship Record	United States	3:01.09	Grosseto, Italy	18 July 2004
World U20 Leading	Great Britain	3:05.25	Tallinn, Estonia	18 July 2021

== Results ==
=== Heats ===
Qualification: First 3 of each heat ( Q ) plus the 2 fastest times ( q ) qualified for the final.

Rank	Heat	Nation	Athletes	Time	Notes
1	2	Kenya	Joshua Wanyonyi, Elkanah Kiprotich Chemelil, Kennedy Kimeu, Peter Kithome	3:05.77	Q, SB
2	2	Jamaica	Antonio Hanson, Tahj Hamm, Malachi Johnson, Jeremy Bembridge	3:05.82	Q, SB
3	2	Botswana	Busang Collen Kebinatshipi, Phenyo Bongani Majama, Thusoyaone Gabanatlhong, Oreeditse Masede	3:06.33	Q, SB
4	1	Nigeria	Johnson Nnamani, Dubem Amene, Ezekiel Nathaniel, Bamidele Ajayi	3:06.70	Q, SB
5	1	Ecuador	Katriel Angulo, Miguel Angel Maldonado, Steeven Salas, Alan Minda	3:06.94	Q, NR
6	1	Poland	Mateusz Matera, Michał Wróbel, Jakub Kozacki, Patryk Grzegorzewicz	3:09.59	Q
7	1	Italy	Stefano Grendene, Francesco Pernici, Masresha Costa, Tommaso Boninti	3:09.71	q
8	2	Romania	Denis Simon Toma, Mark Fandly, Adrian Bondoc, Remus Andrei Niculiță	3:10.22	q, SB
9	1	South Africa	Divan Vlok, Adrian John Swart, Keanu Domingo, Ryan Jordan	3:10.45	SB
10	2	Brazil	Izaias Alves, João Henrrique Ribeiro Barros, Gabriel Alves dos Santos, Vinicius Moura	3:10.53	SB
11	2	India	Abdul Razak Cherankulangara Rasheed, Sumit Chahal, Kapil, Barath Sridhar	3:10.62	SB

=== Final ===
The final was held on 22 August at 18:16.

Rank	Nation	Athletes	Time	Notes
1st place, gold medalist(s)	Botswana	Busang Collen Kebinatshipi, Anthony Pesela, Oreeditse Masede, Phenyo Bongani Majama	3:05.22	WU20L
2nd place, silver medalist(s)	Jamaica	Malachi Johnson, Jeremy Bembridge, Tahj Hamm, Devontie Archer	3:05.76	SB
3rd place, bronze medalist(s)	Kenya	Joshua Wanyonyi, Elkanah Kiprotich Chemelil, Kennedy Kimeu, Peter Kithome	3:05.94	
4	Nigeria	Johnson Nnamani, Dubem Amene, Ezekiel Nathaniel, Bamidele Ajayi	3:07.19	
5	Ecuador	Katriel Ángulo, Miguel Angel Maldonado, Steeven Salas, Alan Minda	3:09.32	
6	Poland	Michał Wróbel, Jakub Sobura-Durma, Jakub Kozacki, Patryk Grzegorzewicz	3:09.74	
7	Romania	Denis Simon Toma, Mark Fandly, Adrian Bondoc, Remus Andrei Niculiță	3:10.07	SB
8	Italy	Stefano Grendene, Tommaso Boninti, Francesco Pernici, Lorenzo Benati	3:12.16	
