= Athletics at the 2026 Commonwealth Games – Women's 400 metres =

Women's 400 metres at the 2026 Commonwealth Games
- Venue: Scotstoun Stadium, Glasgow
- Dates: 28 July 2026 (round 1); 30 July 2026 (semifinals); 1 August 2026 (final)
- Competitors: 24 from 19 nations
- Winning time: 50.21

Medalists
gold medal	Dejanea Oakley	Jamaica
silver medal	Sada Williams	Barbados
bronze medal	Ella Onojuvwevwo	Nigeria

The women's 400 metres at the 2026 Commonwealth Games, as part of the athletics programme, took place at the Scotstoun Stadium from 28 July to 1 August 2026.

== Records ==
Prior to this competition, the existing world and Games records were as follows:

Women's 400 Metres
World record	47.60	Marita Koch (GDR)	Bruce Stadium, Australia	6 Oct 1985
Commonwealth record	48.36	Shaunae Miller-Uibo (BAH)	Tokyo. Japan	6 Aug 2021
Games record	49.90	Sada Williams (BAR)	Birmingham, England	7 August 2022

== Schedule ==
The schedule was as follows:

Date	Time	Round
28 July 2026	10:30	Round 1
30 July 2026	12:45	Semi-finals
1 August 2026	12:20	Final

All times are United Kingdom time (UTC+1)

== Results ==
=== Round 1 ===
Round 1 took place on the morning of 28 July 2026. 18 best performers (q) advance to the semi-finals.

==== Heat 1 ====
Place	Lane	Athlete	Nation	Time	Notes
1	4	Charlotte Henrich	Wales	52.13	q
2	5	Laviai Nielsen	England	52.72	q
3	7	Jamara Patterson	Grenada	52.79	q
4	3	Niddy Mingilishi	Zambia	54.04	q
5	8	Mauren Banura	Uganda	55.46	q
6	2	Naledi Monthe	Botswana	56.30	
—	6	Marie Bangura	Sierra Leone	DQ	TR17.2.3

==== Heat 2 ====
Place	Lane	Athlete	Nation	Time	Notes
1	7	Lauren Gale	Canada	51.59	q
2	5	Nicole Yeargin	Scotland	52.44	q
3	3	Leah Anderson	Jamaica	52.74	q
4	6	Patience Okon George	Nigeria	53.27	q
5	8	Kennekae Batisani	Botswana	54.60	q
6	4	Caitlyn Bobb	Bermuda	54.94	q
7	2	Aminath Layaana Mohamed	Maldives	1:01.05	
—	1	Amani Kirnon	Montserrat	DQ	TR16.8

==== Heat 3 ====
Place	Lane	Athlete	Nation	Time	Notes
1	4	Obakeng Kamberuka	Botswana	51.54	q
2	3	Shana Kaye Anderson	Jamaica	52.71	q
3	2	Esther Joseph	Nigeria	52.82	q
4	7	Mercy Chebet	Kenya	53.16	q
5	8	Mamakoli Senauoane	Lesotho	53.45	q
6	5	Asimenye Simwaka	Malawi	54.16	q, SB
7	6	Leni Shida	Uganda	55.01	q
8	1	Emeldah Kapunjila	Zambia	56.87	

=== Semi-finals ===
The semi-final was scheduled for the morning of 30 July 2026. First 2 in each heat (Q) and the next 2 fastest (q) advance to the final.

==== Heat 1 ====
Place	Lane	Athlete	Nation	Time	Notes
1	7	Yemi Mary John	England	51.67	Q
2	5	Obakeng Kamberuka	Botswana	52.10	Q
3	5	Mercy Adongo Oketch	Kenya	52.85	
4	8	Shana Kaye Anderson	Jamaica	52.87	
5	3	Patience Okon George	Nigeria	53.21	
6	4	Esther Joseph	Nigeria	53.26	
7	1	Caitlyn Bobb	Bermuda	55.17	
8	2	Mauren Banura	Uganda	57.91	

==== Heat 2 ====
Place	Lane	Athlete	Nation	Time	Notes
1	6	Dejanea Oakley	Jamaica	51.18	Q
2	4	Sada Williams	Barbados	51.85	Q
3	5	Nicole Yeargin	Scotland	51.98	q
4	7	Lauren Gale	Canada	52.05	q
5	8	Laviai Nielsen	England	52.17	
6	3	Mamakoli Senauoane	Lesotho	53.91	
7	1	Kennekae Batisani	Botswana	55.25	
—	2	Asimenye Simwaka	Malawi	DQ	

==== Heat 3 ====
Place	Lane	Athlete	Nation	Time	Notes
1	7	Ella Onojuvwevwo	Nigeria	51.47	Q
2	5	Charlotte Henrich	Wales	52.13	Q
3	6	Jamara Patterson	Grenada	52.92	
4	4	Marlie Viljoen	South Africa	52.99	
5	8	Mercy Chebet	Kenya	53.49	
6	3	Leah Anderson	Jamaica	54.15	
7	2	Niddy Mingilishi	Zambia	55.01	
8	1	Leni Shida	Uganda	55.85	

=== Final ===
The final of the women's 400 metres was scheduled for the morning of 1 August 2026.

Place	Lane	Athlete	Nation	Time	Notes
1st place, gold medalist(s)	4	Dejanea Oakley	Jamaica	50.21	
2nd place, silver medalist(s)	5	Sada Williams	Barbados	50.99	
3rd place, bronze medalist(s)	6	Ella Onojuvwevwo	Nigeria	51.00	
4	3	Charlotte Henrich	Wales	51.16	
5	1	Nicole Yeargin	Scotland	51.27	
6	7	Yemi Mary John	England	51.60	
7	2	Lauren Gale	Canada	52.01	
8	8	Obakeng Kamberuka	Botswana	52.53	
