= Dejanea Oakley =

Jamaican sprinter (born 2004)

Personal information
- Nationality: Jamaican
- Born: 4 July 2004 (age 22) Clarendon, Jamaica

Sport
- Sport: Athletics
- Event: Sprint
- College team: Texas Longhorns; Georgia Bulldogs

Achievements and titles
- Personal bests: 400m: 48.79 (2026); Indoor; 400m: 50.47 (2026) NR
Medal record
Women's athletics
Representing Jamaica
World Championships
Silver medal – second place	2025 Tokyo	4 × 400 m relay
Commonwealth Games
Gold medal – first place	2026 Glasgow	400 m
Gold medal – first place	2026 Glasgow	4×400m Mixed
World U20 Championships
Silver medal – second place	2022 Cali	4x400 m relay
Pan American U20 Championships
Bronze medal – third place	2023 Mayagüez	400 m
Silver medal – second place	2023 Mayagüez	4×100 m relay

Dejanea Oakley (born 4 July 2004) is a Jamaican sprinter. She ran the Jamaican indoor national record for the 400 metres to win the 2026 NCAA Indoor Championships, that year also winning the 2026 NCAA Outdoor Championships in a record NCAA time and the gold medal at the 2026 Commonwealth Games.

She was previously a silver medalist at the 2025 World Athletics Championships in the women's 4 × 400 metres relay, and runner-up in the 400 m at the 2025 Jamaican Championships.

== Biography ==
Oakley attended Clarendon College in Clarendon Parish, Jamaica.

== Career ==
In 2022, Oakley won the class one title over 400 metres in a time of 51.81 seconds, at the ISSA Boys and Girls National Championships in Kingston. That year, Oakley won a silver medal as part of the Jamaican women 4 × 400 m relay team at the 2022 World Athletics U20 Championships in Cali, Colombia. She also placed fifth in the individual 400 metres in a personal best of 52.31 seconds at the Championships. The following year, Oakley won a bronze medal in the 400m and a silver medal in the 4 x 400 metres relay at the 2023 Pan American U20 Athletics Championships in Mayagüez, Puerto Rico.

Oakley competed in the United States college system for the University of Texas before transferring to the University of Georgia in 2024. She qualified for the final of the 2025 NCAA Division I Indoor Track and Field Championships in Virginia Beach, running the 400 metres in a time of 51.85 seconds in the semi-final, before placing third in the final in 51.15 seconds. Oakley finished second over 400 metres at the 2025 NCAA Outdoor Championships in Eugene, Oregon having lowered her personal best to 50.18 seconds in the semi-final before running 49.65 in the final to finish behind Aaliyah Butler.

== 2025 ==
Oakley finished in second place in 50.08 seconds behind defending champion Nickisha Pryce in the final of the 400 metres at the Jamaican Athletics Championships in Kingston, Jamaica in June 2025, having previously won her semi-final in 51.15 seconds. She finished fifth over 400 metres at the 2025 Prefontaine Classic on 5 July. She was named in the Jamaican squad for the 2025 NACAC Championships in Nassau, The Bahamas. She was also selected for the Jamaican team for the 2025 World Athletics Championships in Tokyo, Japan. She signed a name image and likeness (NIL) contract with sportswear brand On in 2025.

== 2026 ==
In February 2026, Oakley ran 51.21 seconds to place second behind Ella Onojuvwevwo in the 400 meters final at the 2026 SEC Indoor Championships. Competing at the 2026 NCAA Division I Indoor Track and Field Championships, she qualified for the final of the 400 metres with a run of 51.43 seconds before running a Jamaican indoor national record 50.47 seconds to win the final ahead of Madison Whyte and Onojuvwevwo. In May, Oakley ran 48.92 for the 400 m at the SEC Outdoor Championships, three hundredths of a second behind Nickisha Pryce collegiate record. In June, Oakley won the 400 metres final at the 2026 NCAA Championships, her winning time of 48.79 seconds a new NCAA record, 0.10 second faster than the previous record held by Nickisha Pryce since 2024. The time also moved her to 13th on the world all-time list. On 3 July, Oakley won over 400 metres at the 2026 Prefontaine Classic. On 1 August, she won the 400 metres final at the 2026 Commonwealth Games in Glasgow, Scotland. Later that day, she also won a gold medal in the mixed 4 × 400 m relay.
