= Micha Powell =

Canadian sprinter (born 1995)

Personal information
- Born: January 12, 1995 (age 31) Montreal, Quebec
- Height: 177 cm (5 ft 9 1/2 in)
- Weight: 55 kg (121 lb)

Sport
- Country: Canada
- Sport: Athletics
- Event: Sprints

Achievements and titles
- Personal best: 400m: 51.97
Medal record
Women's athletics
Representing Canada
Commonwealth Games
Gold medal – first place	2022 Birmingham	4×400 m relay

Micha Powell (born January 12, 1995, in Montreal, Quebec) is a Canadian track and field sprinter who competes predominantly in the 400m event.

Her parents are former Canadian Olympic track and field medalist Rosey Edeh and American current world record holder in the long jump Mike Powell.
