= Athletics at the 2023 African Games – Women's 4 × 400 metres relay =

The women's 4 × 400 metres relay event at the 2023 African Games was held on 22 March 2024 in Accra, Ghana.

== Results ==
Rank	Lane	Nation	Athletes	Time	Notes
1st place, gold medalist(s)	1	Nigeria	Esther Joseph, Patience Okon George, Brittany Ogunmokun, Omolara Ogunmakinju	3:27.29	
2nd place, silver medalist(s)	7	Zambia	Niddy Mingilishi, Quincy Malekani, Abygirl Sepiso, Rhoda Njobvu	3:31.85	NR
3rd place, bronze medalist(s)	2	Botswana	Tlhomphang Basele, Lydia Jele, Obakeng Kamberuka, Oratile Nowe	3:33.44	
4	6	Ethiopia	Tadelech Hote, Hana Tadesse, Banchiayehu Tesema, Msgana Haylu	3:42.35	
5	4	Namibia	Jade Nangula, Johanna Ludgerus, Hanganeni Fikunawa, Napuumue Hengari	3:54.25	
	3	Republic of the Congo		DNS	
	5	Kenya		DNS	
	8	Uganda		DNS	
