= Bassant Hemida =

Egyptian sprinter (born 1996)

Personal information
- Full name: Bassant Muhammad Awad Abdel Salam Hemida
- Born: 28 September 1996 (age 29)

Sport
- Sport: Athletics
- Events: 100 m, 200 m
- Coached by: Mohamed Abbas

Achievements and titles
- Personal bests: 100m (11.02 sec), 200m(22.41 sec)

Bassant Muhammad Awad Abdel Salam Hemida (Arabic: بسنت محمد عوض عبد السلام حميدة; born 28 September 1996), known as Bassant Hemida, is an Egyptian sprinter. She won two medals at the 2019 African Games.

She holds her country's national records in the 100 (11.02) and 200 metres (22.41).

On 30 June Passant sat a new 100 m games record at the Mediterranean Games after she ran 11.10s with a tail wind of 0.5 m/s, she also sat a new 200m record at the same tournament after she ran 22.47s.

She has two younger brothers who compete internationally for Qatar – Bassem Hemeida is a hurdler while Seif Heneida is a pole vaulter.

== International competitions ==
Year	Competition	Venue	Position	Event	Notes
Representing Egypt
2012	Arab Junior Championships	Amman, Jordan	2nd	100 m	12.12
2012	Arab Junior Championships	Amman, Jordan	1st	200 m	24.95
2013	Arab Youth Championships	Cairo, Egypt	1st	100 m	12.26
2013	Arab Youth Championships	Cairo, Egypt	2nd	200 m	24.71
2013	Arab Youth Championships	Cairo, Egypt	2nd	Medley relay	2:23.85
2014	Arab Junior Championships	Cairo, Egypt	1st	100 m	12.13
2014	Arab Junior Championships	Cairo, Egypt	2nd	200 m	25.21
2015	African Junior Championships	Addis Ababa, Ethiopia	6th	100 m	12.50
2015	African Junior Championships	Addis Ababa, Ethiopia	–	200 m	DQ
2016	Mediterranean U23 Championships	Tunis, Tunisia	4th	100 m	11.72
2016	Mediterranean U23 Championships	Tunis, Tunisia	2nd	200 m	23.64
2018	Mediterranean U23 Championships	Jesolo, Italy	3rd	100 m	11.62
2018	Mediterranean U23 Championships	Jesolo, Italy	2nd	200 m	23.89
2018	Mediterranean Games	Tarragona, Spain	6th	200 m	23.47
2018	African Championships	Asaba, Nigeria	8th (sf)	100 m	11.86
2019	Universiade	Naples, Italy	7th	100 m	11.53
2019	African Games	Rabat, Morocco	3rd	100 m	11.31
2019	African Games	Rabat, Morocco	2nd	200 m	22.89
2019	World Championships	Doha, Qatar	14th (sf)	200 m	22.92
2021	Arab Championships	Radès, Tunisia	2nd	100 m	11.45
2021	Arab Championships	Radès, Tunisia	2nd	200 m	23.08
2022	World Indoor Championships	Belgrade, Serbia	27th (h)	60 m	7.31
2022	Mediterranean Games	Oran, Algeria	1st	100 m	11.10
2022	Mediterranean Games	Oran, Algeria	1st	200 m	22.47
2023	Arab Championships	Marrakesh, Morocco	1st	100 m	11.33
2024	African Championships	Douala, Cameroon	8th (h)	200 m	23.59^{1}
2025	World Indoor Championships	Nanjing, China	7th (h)	400 m	52.62
2025	Arab Championships	Oran, Algeria	1st	100 m	11.52
2025	Arab Championships	Oran, Algeria	1st	200 m	23.81
2025	Arab Championships	Oran, Algeria	2nd	4 × 100 m relay	47.89
2025	World Championships	Tokyo, Japan	16th (sf)	400 m	50.69
2026	World Indoor Championships	Toruń, Poland	15th (sf)	400 m	53.14
2026	African Championships	Accra, Ghana	4th	400 m	52.00

^{1}Did not start in the semifinals

== Personal bests ==
Outdoor

- 100 metres – 11.02 () NR
- 200 metres – 22.41 () NR
