= Jill Cherry =

Scottish athlete (born 1998)

Personal information
- Born: 1 March 1998 (age 28) Glasgow, Scotland

Sport
- Sport: Track and Field
- Event(s): 400m, 800m
Medal record
Women's athletics
Representing Great Britain
European U20 Championships
Bronze medal – third place	2017 Grosseto	4x400 m
Representing Scotland
Commonwealth Games
Bronze medal – third place	2022 Birmingham	4x400 m

Jill Cherry (born 1 March 1998) is a Scottish middle-distance runner. She was a bronze medalist at the 2022 Commonwealth Games 4 x 400 metres relay, running for Scotland. She won a bronze medal at the 2017 European Athletics U20 Championships running for Great Britain.

== Early life ==
From Airdrie, Cherry attended St Margaret’s High School. She attended Scotland's National Academy in 2016, where her peers included Erin Wallace and Alisha Rees.

== Career ==
She has been coached from a young age by Allan Scott. She runs for the Victoria Park City of Glasgow (VP-Glasgow) athletics club in Scotland. She won the U20 women’s 400 metres race at the England Athletics Age Group Championships in Sheffield in February 2017. She won a bronze medal at the 2017 European Athletics U20 Championships in the 4 x 400 metres relay after running the heats for the British team in Grosseto, Italy,

Cherry placed fourth overall in the 2022 British Indoor Athletics Championships over 800 metres. At the 2022 Commonwealth Games in Birmingham, England, Cherry ran in the 4 x 400 metres relay for the Scottish team, winning the bronze medal alongside Zoey Clark, Beth Dobbin and Nicole Yeargin. She was a travelling reserve for the relay, and had been drafted in to run the day before the race following an injury to her teammate Carys McAulay.

She was a finalist in the 800 metres at the 2023 British Indoor Athletics Championships. She was chosen to represent Scotland at the 2024 Loughborough International in May 2024. She won the 400 metres at the Scottish Championships in August 2024 in a personal best time.
