= Ella Onojuvwevwo =

Nigerian sprinter (born 2005)

Personal information
- Nationality: Nigerian
- Born: 25 March 2005 (age 21)

Sport
- Sport: Athletics
- Event: Sprint
- College team: LSU Lady Tigers

Achievements and titles
- Personal bests: 200m: 22.56 (Baton Rouge 2026); 400m: 49.47 ( College Station 2026)
Medal record
Women's athletics
Representing Nigeria
African Championships
Gold medal – first place	2024 Douala	4×400 m relay
Silver medal – second place	2022 Saint Pierre	Mixed 4x400 m relay
Silver medal – second place	2024 Douala	Mixed 4×400 m relay
Bronze medal – third place	2022 Saint Pierre	4x400 m relay
Commonwealth Games
Bronze medal – third place	2026 Glasgow	400 m
Bronze medal – third place	2026 Glasgow	4×400m Mixed
World Athletics U20 Championships
Gold medal – first place	2021 Nairobi	4x400 m relay
Bronze medal – third place	2021 Nairobi	Mixed 4x400 m relay

Ella Onojuvwevwo (born 25 March 2005) is a Nigerian sprinter. In 2026, she became the African indoor record holder for the 400 metres and won the bronze medal at the 2026 Commonwealth Games.

== Early life ==
In November 2022, she agreed to join Louisiana State University in the United States.

== Career ==
In 2021, she won gold as part of the women's 4 × 400 m relay and mixed 4 × 400 m relay at the 2021 World Athletics U20 Championships in Nairobi.

Onojuvwevwo was a silver medallist at the 2022 African Championships in the mixed 4 × 400 m relay in Mauritius and also won bronze at the championships in the women's 4 × 400 m relay. She was part of the Nigerian team that competed in the 400 metres and the 4 × 400 m relay at the 2022 Commonwealth Games in Birmingham, in which they qualified for the final and finished sixth.

Onojuvwevwo ran for Nigeria as part of the 4 × 400 m relay team at the 2023 World Athletics Championships in Budapest.

In April 2024, she lowered her personal best over 400 metres to 51.32 seconds in Florida.

Onojuvwevwo competed for Nigeria at the 2024 World Athletics Relays in Nassau, Bahamas. With a time of 3:12.87, the Nigerian Mixed 4x400m team of Onojuvwevwo, Samuel Ogazi, Chidi Okezie and Esther Joseph set a new Nigerian national record and African Continental record at the event on 5 May 2024.

The following weekend she lowered her personal best to 50.57 seconds at the SEC championships in Florida. The time met the 2024 Olympic qualifying standard and made her the fastest Nigerian woman since Falilat Ogunkoya ran 50.50s in 2001, and placed her fifth on the Nigerian all-time list.

She competed at the 2024 Summer Olympics over 400 metres in August 2024, reaching the semi-final. She also competed in the mixed 4 × 400 m relay at the Games.

She qualified second fastest for the final of the 400 metres at the 2024 World Athletics U20 Championships in Lima, Peru, before placing fifth in the final.

Competing for Louisiana State University, Onojuvwevwo won the 400 meters final in 50.92 seconds ahead of Dejanea Oakley at the 2026 SEC Indoor Championships. Competing at the 2026 NCAA Division I Indoor Track and Field Championships in March, Onojuvwevwo ran a new African indoor 400 metres record in the preliminary round, running 50.28 seconds, before placing third in the final in 50.76 seconds behind Oakley and Madison Whyte.

In 2026, Onojuvwevwo opened her season with a blistering run at the Battle of the Bayou, setting a new 400M personal best of 49.59 seconds. She recorded the fastest Nigerian women’s 400m time since Falilat Ogunkoya in 1998, and became the first Nigerian woman to run sub-50 seconds since 1999. The performance ranks as the 10th fastest 400M NCAA time in history, set a new Louisiana State University (LSU) record, and placed her seventh on the African all-time list and fourth on Nigeria’s all-time performers list.

On 6 June 2026, Onojuvwevwo set a new personal best 49.47 seconds to win the women’s 400 metres at the USATF Lone Star Grand Prix in College Station, Texas. In July, she placed fifth over 400 metres at the 2026 Prefontaine Classic, and won the women's 400 m in 50.38 seconds at the Ed Murphey Classic in Memphis, Tennessee. On 1 August, she won the bronze medal in the 400 metres final at the 2026 Commonwealth Games in Glasgow, Scotland. Later that day also winning the bronze medal in the mixed 4 × 400 m relay. In September, she competed over 400 m at the inaugural World Ultimate Championship in Budapest.
