= Athletics at the 2011 All-Africa Games – Women's 4 × 400 metres relay =

The women's 4 × 400 metres relay event at the 2011 All-Africa Games was held on 15 September 2011.

== Results ==
Rank	Nation	Athletes	Time	Notes
1st place, gold medalist(s)	Nigeria	?, ?, ?, Bukola Abogunloko	3:31.21	
2nd place, silver medalist(s)	Senegal	?, ?, ?, Amy Mbacké Thiam	3:32.21	
3rd place, bronze medalist(s)	Kenya	?, ?, ?, Sakari Joy Nakumicha	3:37.37	
4	Botswana	?, ?, ?, ?	3:38.54	
5	Zimbabwe	?, ?, ?, ?	4:04.72	
