= Ajayeba Aliye =

Ethiopian sprinter (born 2007)

Personal information
- Full name: Ajayba Aliye Ahmed
- Born: 6 June 2007 (age 19)

Sport
- Sport: Athletics
- Event: Sprint

Achievements and titles
- Personal bests: 200m: 24.12 (2026); 400m: 51.37 (2026)
Medal record
Women's athletics
Representing Ethiopia
African Championships
| Gold medal – first place | 2026 Accra | 400 m |

Ajayba Aliye Ahmed (born 6 June 2007) is an Ethiopian sprinter. She won the gold medal in the 400 metres at the 2026 African Championships in Athletics.

== Biography ==
In March 2026, she won senior national titles at the Ethiopian Athletics Championships over both 200 metres and 400 metres.

In May 2026, she represented Ethiopia at the 2026 World Athletics Relays in Gaborone, Botswana. Later that month, she won the gold medal in the 400 metres at the 2026 African Championships in Athletics in Accra, Ghana, in 51.54 seconds, having also qualified fastest for the final with a personal best 51.37 seconds. She was selected to represent Ethiopia at the 2026 World Athletics U20 Championships in Eugene, United States.
