= Esther Joseph =

Nigerian sprinter (born 2003)

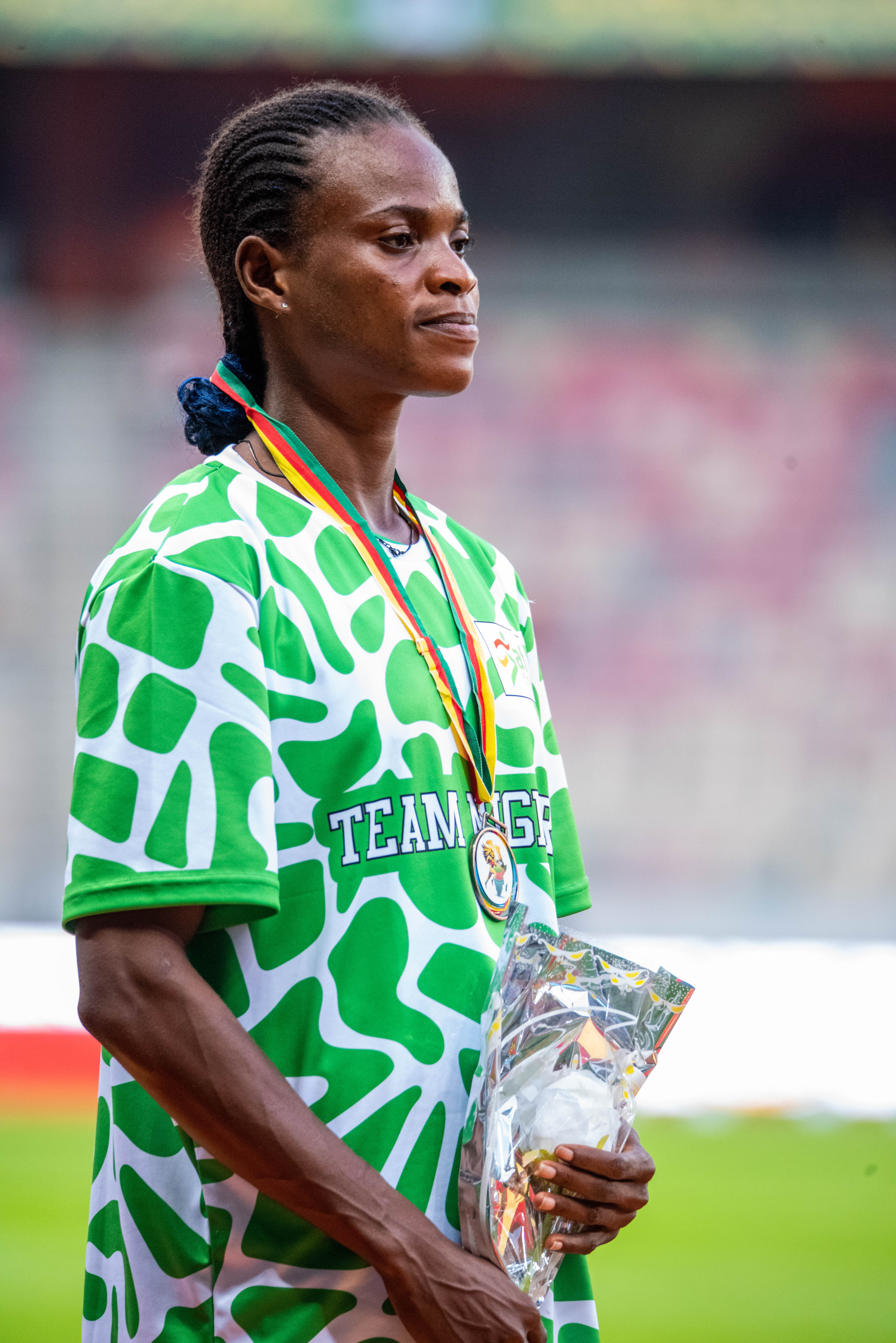
- 2024 African Championships in Athletics

Personal information
- Full name: Esther Elo Joseph
- Nationality: Nigerian
- Born: 4 April 2003 (age 23)
- Height: 1.52 m (5 ft 0 in)

Sport
- Sport: Athletics
- Event: Sprinter

Achievements and titles
- Personal bests: 400m: 51.36 (Clemson, 2026)
Medal record
Women's athletics
Representing Nigeria
African Games
Gold medal – first place	2023 Accra	4x400 m relay
Silver medal – second place	2023 Accra	400 m
Commonwealth Games
Bronze medal – third place	2026 Glasgow	4×400m Mixed

Esther Elo Joseph (born 4 April 2003) is a Nigerian sprinter.

== Biography ==
Making her international debut at the 2023 African Games in Accra, she won the silver medal in the 400 metres behind Mary Moraa, setting a personal best in all three of her races, culminating in a time of 51.61 seconds in the final. She returned to the championships and won a gold in the 4 × 400 m metres relay.

In May 2024, she competed for Nigeria at the 2024 World Athletics Relays in Nassau, Bahamas. With a time of 3:12.87, the Nigerian Mixed 4x400m team of Joseph, Samuel Ogazi, Ella Onojuvwevwo, and Chidi Okezie set a new Nigerian national record and African Continental record at the event on 5 May 2024. She competed at the 2024 Summer Olympics over 400 metres in August 2024, but was ultimately disqualified.

Competing for the University of Tennessee, Joseph ran 51.36 seconds to win 400 metres indoors at the Bob Pollock Invitational in Clemson in January 2026. The time moved her to fifth on the African all-time indoor list. She subsequently qualified for the 2026 NCAA Division I Indoor Track and Field Championships. In July, she was a semi-finalist in the 400 metres at the 2026 Commonwealth Games in Glasgow, Scotland. Later at the Games, she won the bronze medal in the mixed 4 x 400 metres relay.
