= Marlie Viljoen =

South African sprinter (born 2000)

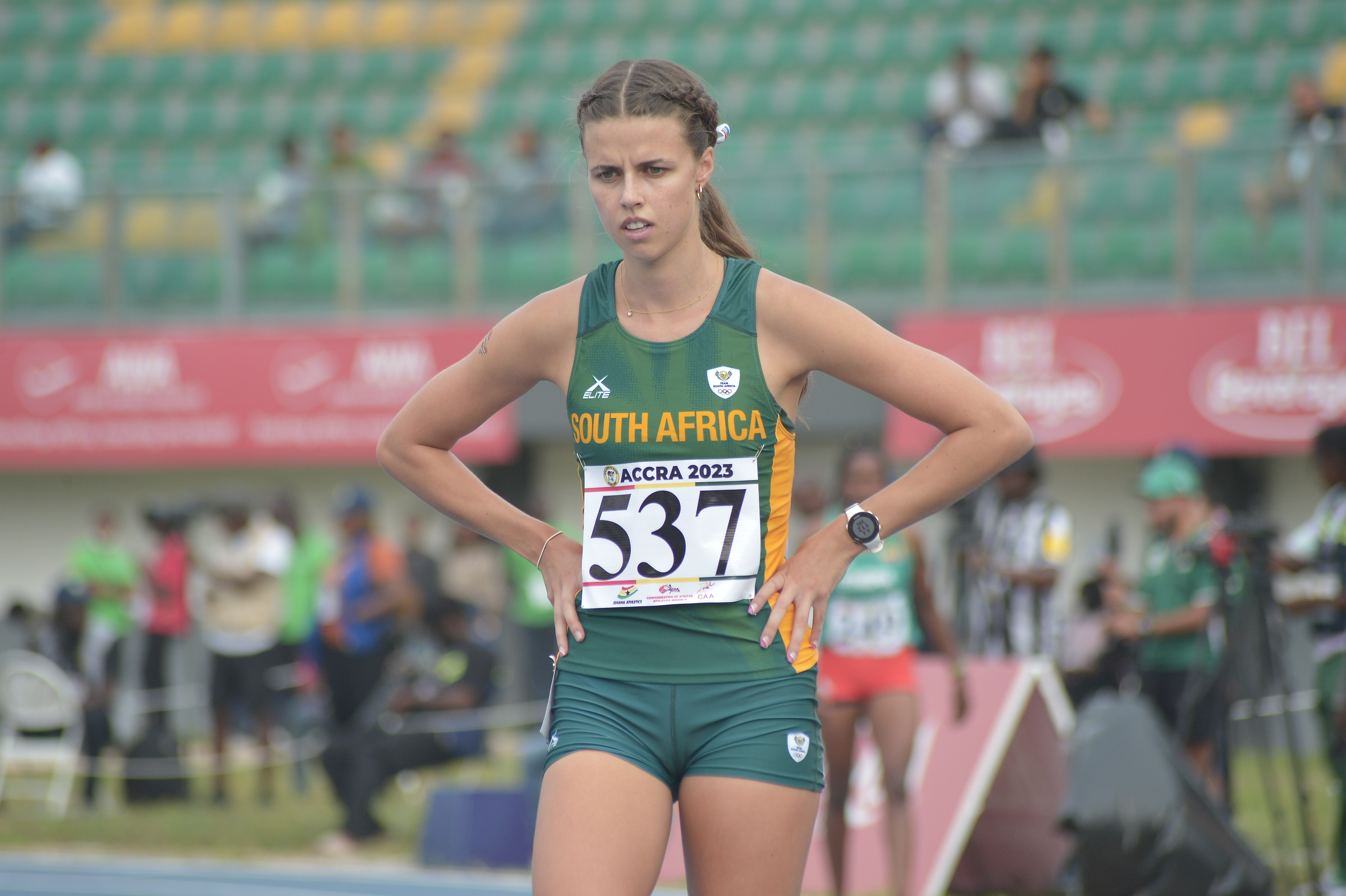
- Viljoen at the 2023 African Games

Personal information
- Born: 1 August 2000 (age 26)

Sport
- Sport: Athletics
- Event: Sprint

Achievements and titles
- Personal bests: 200m: 23.83 (Potchefstroom, 2024); 400m: 51.42 (Pretoria, 2025); 800m: 2:11.34 (Pretoria, 2023)
Medal record
Women's athletics
Representing South Africa
Summer World University Games
Gold medal – first place	2021 Chengdu	400 m
Silver medal – second place	2025 Bochum	4 × 400 m mixed

Marlie Viljoen (born 1 August 2000) is South African sprinter who primarily competes over 400 metres, and was a gold medalist at the 2021 Summer World University Games. She went on to compete for South Africa at the 2023 and 2025 World Athletics Championships and won the South African national championships in 2026.

== Biography ==
Viljoen started running in high school before studying at the University of Pretoria, where she undertook a master's degree in marketing management. Initially, she was a long-distance runner before she transitioned down to 800 metres and 400 metres.

She won the gold medal over 400 metres at the delayed 2021 Summer World University Games held in Chengdu, China, in August 2023. Later that month, she competed in the women's 4 x 400 metres relay at the 2023 World Athletics Championships in Budapest, Hungary.

In March 2025, in Tshwane, she was a member of South African women's 4 × 400 m relay team which broke the South African national record alongside Miranda Coetzee, Shirley Nekhubui and Zenéy Geldenhuys who ran 3:28.30 to take 0.19 seconds off the previous best mark of 3:28.49 which was set by Caster Semenya, Jeanelle Griessel, Wenda Nel and Justine Palframan at the African Athletics Championships in Durban in 2016.

Viljoen set a personal best of 51.42 seconds for the 400 m in 2025. She won a silver medal in the Mixed 4 x 400 metres relay at the 2025 Summer World University Games held in Bochum, Germany, in July 2025. She also competed in the individual 400 metres at the Games, reaching the semi-finals. At the 2025 World Athletics Championships in Tokyo, Japan, she competed for South Africa in the women's 4 x 400 metres.

In April 2026, she won the 400 metres title at the South African Championships for the first time, running 51.72 seconds in wet conditions ahead of Jada van Staden. Later that month, she placed third in a national best of 36.30 in the 300 metres at the Simbine Classic in South Africa. In May, she ran at the 2026 World Athletics Relays in the mixed 4 × 400 metres relay. She also ran in the women's 4 × 400 metres relay at the championships in Gaborone, Botswana. In July, she was a semi-finalist in the 400 metres at the 2026 Commonwealth Games in Glasgow, Scotland.
