= Brittany Ogunmokun =

Nigerian athlete

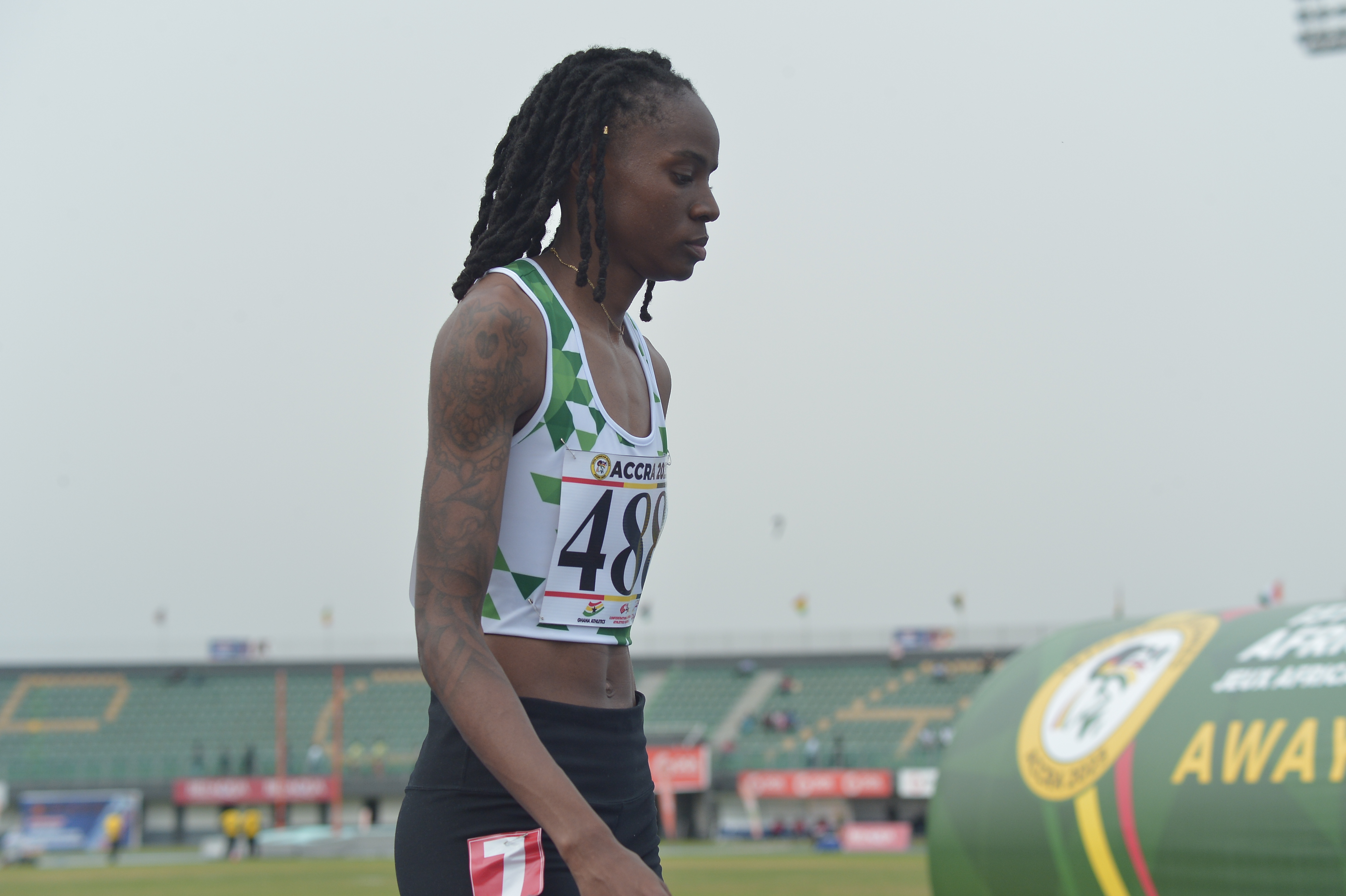

Personal information
- Nationality: Nigeria
- Born: 26 May 1990 (age 36)

Sport
- Sport: Athletics
- Events: 400 m, 800 meters
- University team: Baylor University

Achievements and titles
- Personal bests: 400M: 52.63 (Franklin Field, 2024); 500M: 1.10:00 (Ocean Breeze, 2026); 800M: 2.05.30 (South Bend, 2012)

Brittany Ogunmokun (born 26 May 1990) is a Nigerian track and field athlete. She is a one-time All-African Games winner and national champion. In 2026, she set a new African indoor 500m record, becoming the fastest African woman ever in the event after clocking 1:10.00, surpassing Regina George's 2016 record of 1:11.49, set in Bloomington.

== Early life ==
Brittany Ogunmokun was born on May 26, 1990, in Alexandria, Virginia, USA, to a Nigerian father. She is the daughter of the late Anthony Ogunmokun and Arnitha Bell. Ogunmokun's two sisters, Bridgette, ran track at Bowie State (Maryland), while Briana majored in health science studies.

== Career ==
She is ranked No. 304 in the women's 400m overall rankings by World Athletics. Ogunmokun is a U.S. military veteran who previously joined the United States Air Force, after stepping away from athletics for five years due to military training before returning to the sport.

Ogunmokun was on Baylor University's 2012–2013 track and field roster, where she participated and achieved the following:

1. 2012 All-Big 12 Outdoors (800 meters, 4x400-meter Relay)
2. 2012 All-Big 12 Indoors (800 meters, 4x400-meter Relay)
3. 2011 All-Big 12 Outdoors (800 meters, 4x400-meter Relay)
4. 2011 All-Big 12 Indoors (600 yards)
5. School-record holder (800 meters)
6. 2011 Academic All-Big 12 First Team (cross country)
7. Three-time Big 12 Commissioner[apos]s Honor Roll selection

== Notable accomplishments ==
Lists

- Gold Medal at All African Games in the 4 × 400 m
- Team Nigeria for World Relays
- Qualified for Nigeria Olympic Trials!
- 500m indoor National Record
