= Mary Moraa =

Kenyan sprinter and middle-distance runner (born 2000)

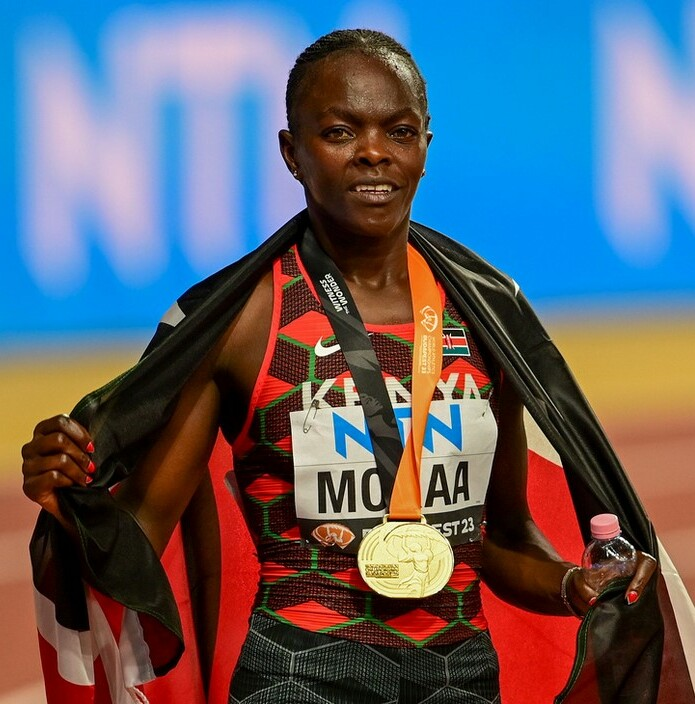
- Moraa in 2023

Personal information
- Nationality: Kenyan
- Born: 15 June 2000 (age 26) Obwari, Nyanza Province, Kenya (now Kisii County, Kenya)

Sport
- Country: Kenya
- Sport: Athletics
- Events: 400 metres, 800 metres
- Coached by: Alex Sang

Achievements and titles
- Highest world ranking: 1st (800 m, 2023)
- Personal bests: 400 m: 50.38 NR (Nairobi 2023); 600 m: 1:21.63 WB (Berlin 2024); 800 m: 1:56.03 (Budapest 2023); Indoors; 800 m: 2:00.61i (Liévin 2023)
Medal record
Women's athletics
Representing Kenya
Olympic Games
Bronze medal – third place	2024 Paris	800 m
World Championships
Gold medal – first place	2023 Budapest	800 m
Bronze medal – third place	2022 Eugene	800 m
Diamond League
First place	2022	800 m
First place	2024	800 m
Commonwealth Games
Gold medal – first place	2022 Birmingham	800 m
African Games
Gold medal – first place	2023 Accra	400 m
Bronze medal – third place	2023 Accra	Mixed 4 × 400 m relay
African U20 Championships
Gold medal – first place	2019 Abidjan	400 m
World Youth Championships
Silver medal – second place	2017 Nairobi	400 m

Mary Moraa (born 15 June 2000) is a Kenyan athlete who specialises in the 800 metres. She won the gold medal at the 2023 World Athletics Championships, a bronze medal in the event at the 2022 World Athletics Championships and a gold at the 2022 Commonwealth Games.

Moraa is the Kenyan record holder for the 400 metres. She was the 2022 Diamond League 800 m champion. She also holds the world best in the 600 metres.

== Background ==
Moraa was orphaned at age 2 after the death of her father and then her mother. She grew up with her grandparents, in Kisii in western Kenya. She won an education bursary through running.

== Career ==
Moraa specialized in the 400 metres distance until 2021. She made her international debut at the World Under-18 Championships in Nairobi and won the silver medal in the event with a personal best time of 53.31 seconds. The following year, the 18-year-old placed fifth over the same distance at the World U20 Championships held in Tampere, Finland, clocking new best of 52.85 s in the heats.

In 2019, she won in the 400 m the African U20 title, Kenyan senior title, and placed fourth at the African Games held in Rabat, Morocco. She reached the semi-finals in her individual event at the Doha World Championships. Her season's best was 51.75 s. She made her debut in the 800 metres that year.

Moraa transitioned to the 800 metres in 2020, and represented Kenya at the delayed 2020 Tokyo Olympics in 2021 competing in the event, where she was eliminated in the semi-finals with a time of 2:00.47.

In July 2022, Moraa won the bronze medal in the 800 m at the World Championships in Eugene, Oregon, clocking a personal best of 1:56.71 behind Athing Mu (1:56.30) and Keely Hodgkinson (1:56.38). The following month, she won a gold in the event at the Birmingham Commonwealth Games after storming through to beat Hodgkinson in the final. She went from first to last and back to first in that race. In September, Moraa became the Diamond League 800 m champion after she won final in Zürich.

== Personal life ==
She is the cousin of Kenyan runner Sarah Moraa. Mary Moraa has described her as her "kid sister" on social media.

== Achievements ==
=== Personal bests ===
- 400 metres – 50.38 (Nairobi 2023) NR
- 800 metres – 1:56.03 (Budapest 2023)
  - 800 metres indoor – 2:00.61 (Liévin 2023)

=== International competitions ===
Representing Kenya
Year	Competition	Venue	Position	Event	Time
2017	World U18 Championships	Nairobi, Kenya	22nd (h)	200 m	25.48
2017	World U18 Championships	Nairobi, Kenya	2nd	400 m	53.31 PB
2017	World U18 Championships	Nairobi, Kenya	4th	4 × 400 m mixed	3:24.92
2018	World U20 Championships	Tampere, Finland	5th	400 m	52.94
2019	African U20 Championships	Abidjan, Ivory Coast	1st	400 m	53.57
2019	African Games	Abidjan, Ivory Coast	4th	400 m	51.97
2019	African Games	Abidjan, Ivory Coast	4th	4 × 400 m relay	3:32.93
2019	World Championships	Doha, Qatar	18th (sf)	400 m	52.11
2019	World Championships	Doha, Qatar	11th (h)	4 × 400 m mixed	3:17.09
2021	World Relays	Chorzów, Poland	13th (h)	4 × 400 m relay	3:39.34 SB
2021	World Relays	Chorzów, Poland	–	4 × 400 m mixed	DQ
2021	Olympic Games	Tokyo, Japan	15th (sf)	800 m	2:00.47
2022	World Championships	Eugene, OR, United States	3rd	800 m	1:56.71 PB
2022	Commonwealth Games	Birmingham, United Kingdom	29th (h)	400 m	59.51
2022	Commonwealth Games	Birmingham, United Kingdom	1st	800 m	1:57.07
2022	Commonwealth Games	Birmingham, United Kingdom	5th	4 × 400 m relay	3:32.28
2023	World Championships	Budapest, Hungary	1st	800 m	1:56.03 PB
2024	African Games	Accra, Ghana	1st	400 m	50.57
2024	Olympic Games	Paris, France	3rd	800 m	1:57.42
2025	World Championships	Tokyo, Japan	7th	800 m	1:57.10

=== Circuit performances ===
Grand Slam Track results
Slam	Race group	Event	Pl.	Time	Prize money
2025 Kingston Slam	Short distance	800 m	8th	2:00.97	US$10,000
2025 Kingston Slam	Short distance	1500 m		DNS	US$10,000
2025 Miami Slam	Short distance	1500 m	8th	4:24.44	US$30,000
2025 Miami Slam	Short distance	800 m	1st	1:59.51	US$30,000
2025 Philadelphia Slam	Short distance	1500 m	7th	4:25.79	US$15,000
2025 Philadelphia Slam	Short distance	800 m	5th	2:00.92	US$15,000

==== Wins and titles ====
- Diamond League 800 metres champion: 2022

800 metres wins, other events specified in parentheses

- 2022: Stockholm Bauhaus-galan, Zürich Weltklasse
- 2023: Rabat Meeting International (SB)

=== National titles ===
- Kenyan Athletics Championships
  - 400 metres: 2019
