= Obakeng Kamberuka =

Botswana athlete (born 2003)

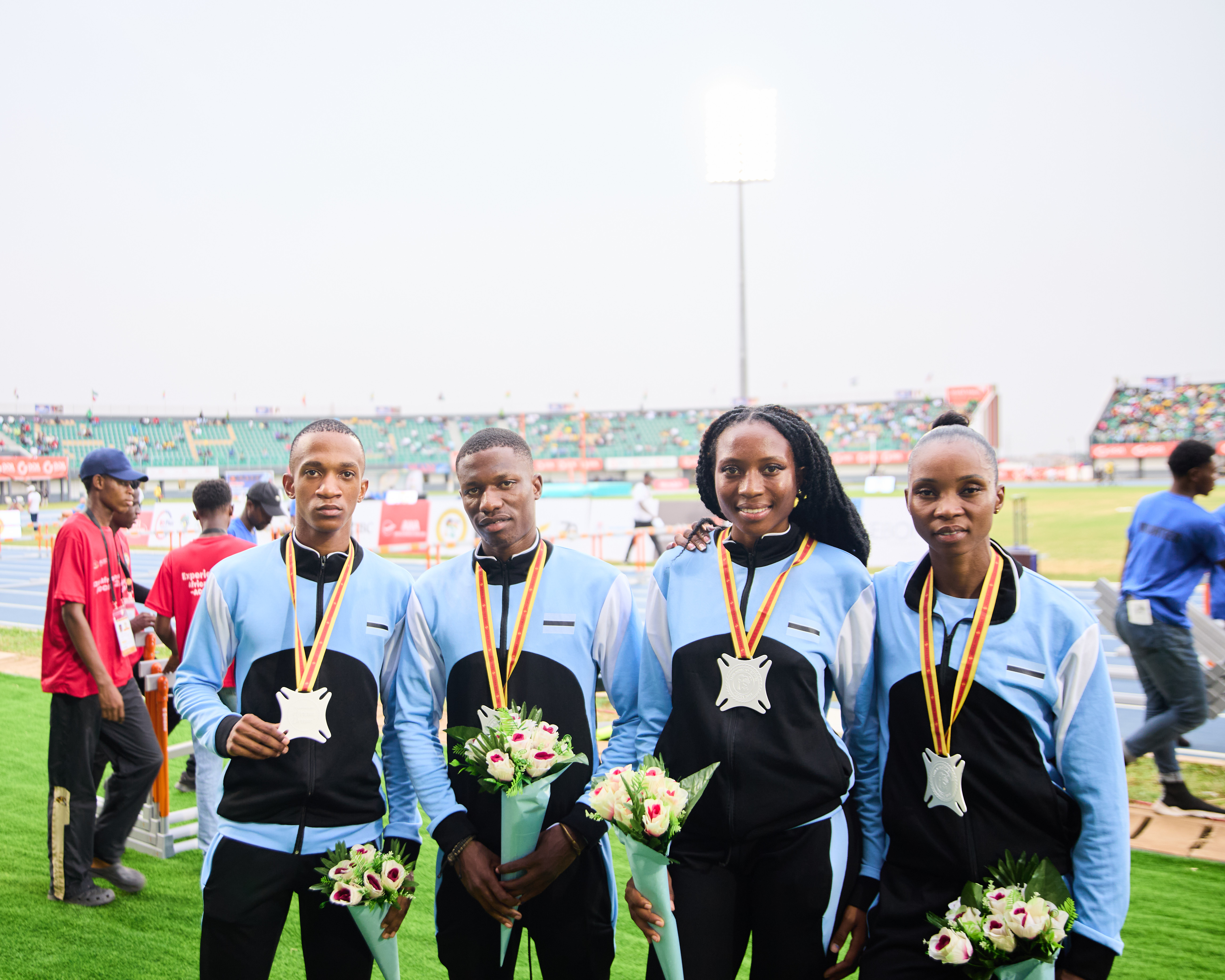
- At the African Games medal ceremony

Personal information
- Full name: Obakeng Thandie Kamberuka
- Nationality: Botswana
- Born: 8 September 2003 (age 22)

Sport
- Sport: Athletics
- Event: Sprint

Achievements and titles
- Personal bests: 200m: 22.79 (Gaborone, 2026) NR; 400m: 50.97 (Gaborone, 2026)
Medal record
Women's Athletics
Representing Botswana
African Games
| Silver medal – second place | 2023 Accra | 4x400m Mixed |
| Bronze medal – third place | 2023 Accra | 4x400m relay |
African Championships
| Silver medal – second place | 2026 Accra | 400 m |
| Bronze medal – third place | 2024 Douala | 4x400 m Mixed |

Obakeng Kamberuka (born 8 September 2003) is a sprinter from Botswana. She became Botswana national champion in 2026 and was a silver medalist in the 400 metres at the 2026 African Championships. That year, she became the Botswana national record holder in the 200 metres.

== Biography ==
In August 2023, she ran as part of the Botswana relay team at the 2023 World Athletics Championships in Budapest, Hungary.

In March 2024, she was a silver medalist in the mixed 4 × 400 m relay, and a bronze medalist in the women's 4 × 400 m relay at the delayed 2023 African Games in Accra, Ghana. She ran as part of the Botswana Mixed 4 × 400 m relay team at the 2024 World Relays Championships in Nassau, Bahamas. She was a bronze medalist that summer in the mixed 4 × 400 m relay at the 2024 African Championships in Douala, Cameroon.

In April 2026, she ran a personal best 50.97 seconds to win the 400 metres title at the 2026 Botswana Championships. In May 2026, she represented Botswana at the 2026 World Athletics Relays in Gaborone, Botswana, and was part of the mixed 4 × 400 m relay team which set a new national record of 3:13.51. She also ran in the women's 4 × 400 metres relay at the championships. Later that month, she was a silver medalist in the 400 metres at the 2026 African Championships in Accra. The following month, she set a Botswana national record in the 200 metres with 22.79 seconds in Gaborone. In July, she was a finalist in the 400 metres at the 2026 Commonwealth Games in Glasgow, Scotland.
