= Miranda Coetzee =

South African athlete (born 1997)

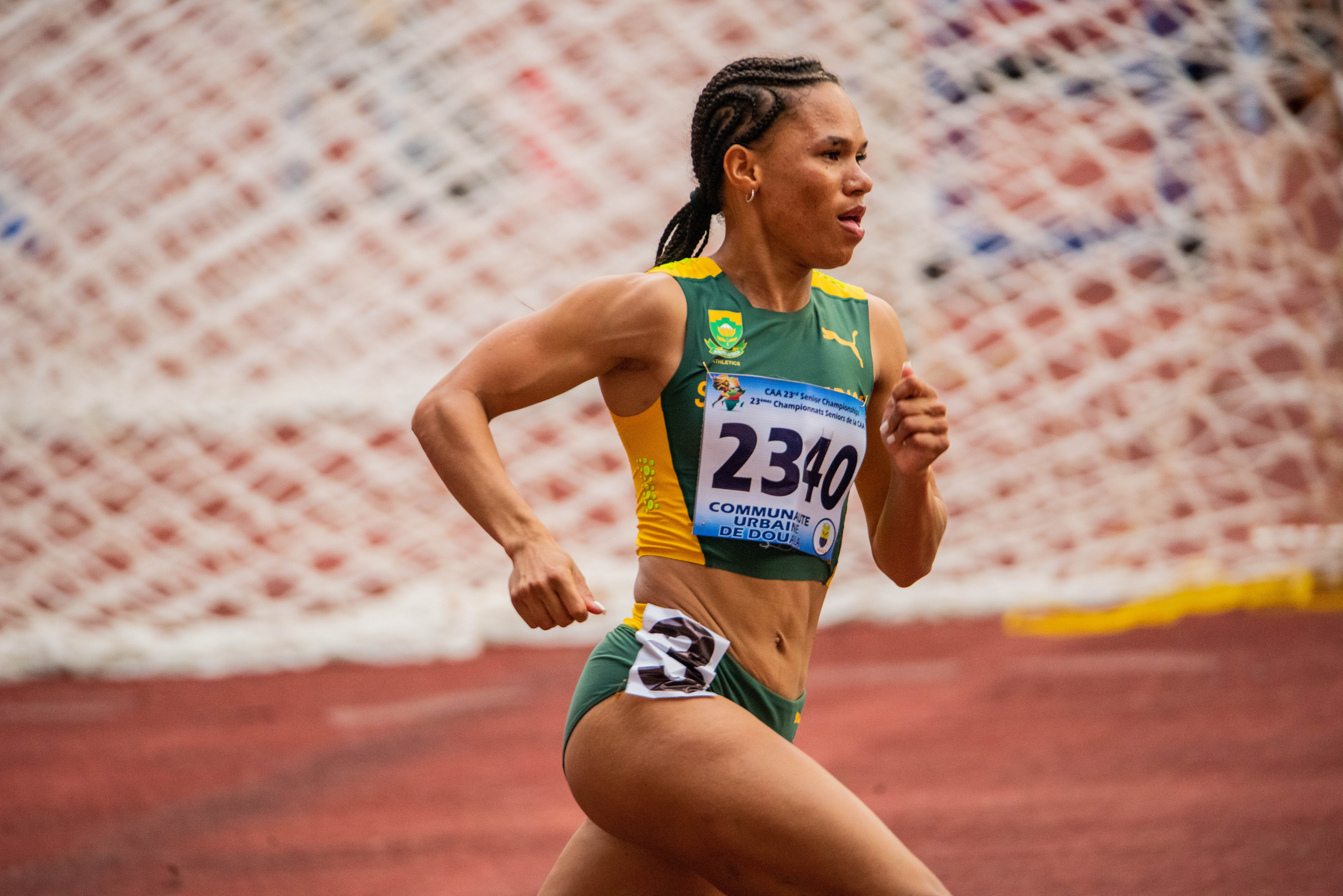
- Coetzee in 2024

Personal information
- Nationality: South African
- Born: Miranda Charlene Coetzee; 14 November 1997 (age 28)

Sport
- Sport: Athletics
- Event: Sprint

Achievements and titles
- Personal bests: 400m:: 50.66 (Paris, 2024)
Medal record
Women's athletics
Representing South Africa
African Championships
Gold medal – first place	2022 Saint Pierre	400 m
Gold medal – first place	2022 Saint Pierre	4x400 m relay
Gold medal – first place	2024 Douala	400 m
Gold medal – first place	2024 Douala	Mixed 4×400 m relay
World Relays
Bronze medal – third place	2025 Guangzhou	4×400 m relay

Miranda Charlene Coetzee (born 14 November 1997) is a South African sprinter. She won gold at the 2022 African Athletics Championships over 400 metres.

== Career ==
She is from Phokeng in Rustenburg. She competed in Netball prior to focusing on athletics. She joined the Royal Bafokeng Club in 2019 where she began training under coach Eugene Thipe.

She became African champion in the 400 metres at the 2022 African Championships in Athletics in Mauritius. She also won gold in the 4x400 metres relay at the championships. In May 2022, she ran a personal best time of 51.50 seconds for the 400 metres at the Kip Keino Classic.

She competed at the 2022 World Athletics Championships in Eugene, Oregon, and the 2022 Commonwealth Games in Birmingham in which she was part of the women's South Africa team which placed fourth im the 4x400m relay.

In 2023, she won a 200 metres and 400 metres double at the South African Championships in Potchefstroom, recording personal best times in both events. She ran under the 51-second mark over 400m for the first time in June 2023 in Spain. She ran at the 2023 World Athletics Championships in Budapest in the 400 metres.

In June 2024, she retained her 400m title at the African Championships in Douala, Cameroon. She competed at the 2024 Summer Olympics over 400 metres in August 2024, running a personal best time of 50.66 seconds to reach the semi-finals.

She was part of the South African women's 4 x 400 metres relay team which ran a 3:24.84 national record to place third at the 2025 World Athletics Relays in China. She subsequently ran in the mixed 4 × 400 metres relay at the 2025 World Championships as well as the women's 400 metres.
