= Shirley Nekhubui =

South African sprinter

Shirley (Nekhubvi) Nekhubui
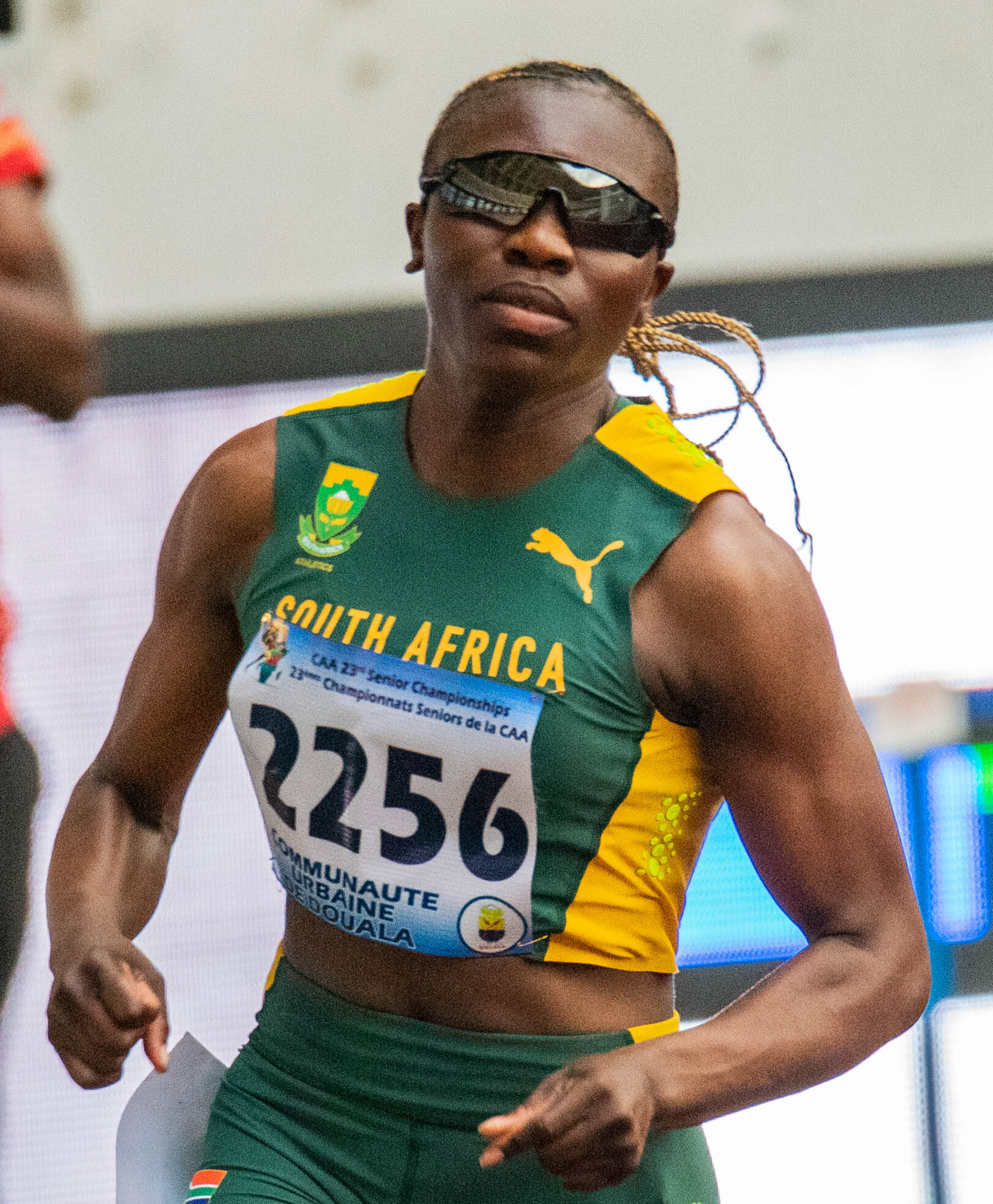

Personal information
- Full name: Shirley Ndishavhelafhi Nekhubui
- Nationality: South African
- Born: 31 July 2000 (age 25) Tswera, Thohoyandou, Limpopo

Sport
- Sport: Athletics
- Event: Sprint
- Club: University of Johannesburg

Achievements and titles
- Personal best(s): 200m: 22.84 (2024); 400m: 51.28 (2025)
Medal record
Women's athletics
Representing South Africa
African Championships
Gold medal – first place	2024 Douala	Mixed 4×400 m relay
World Relays
Bronze medal – third place	2025 Guangzhou	4×400 m relay

Shirley Nekhubui (born 31 July 2000) is a South African sprinter.

== Early life ==
She was born in Tswera, Venda, located in Limpopo, South Africa. She attended Tswera Primary School and later completed her secondary education at David Mutshinyalo Secondary School. Her athletic talent was recognized in 2015 by Mr. Richard Makhumisani, who identified her as a promising young sprinter. She began competing in the 100m, 200m, and 400m events, showing notable success in all three disciplines. She later moved from Tswera to Ha-Ravele, Sinthumule, where she lived with Mr Richard Makhumisani.

Over the years, she trained under several coaches, including Mr. Makonde Makhumisani, Mr. Samuel Sepeng, Mr. Thabo Matebedi and Mr. Paul Gories. In 2023, she joined the University of Johannesburg Athletics Club and began training under Coach Reneilwe Aphane. She represented South Africa at major international competitions, including the 2022 World Athletics Championships in Eugene, Oregon, the 2022 African Championships in Saint Pierre, Mauritius, and the 2022 Commonwealth Games in Birmingham, where she was part of the women's 4 × 400 m relay team that placed fourth.

In 2024, she won gold at the National Championships in Pietermaritzburg, becoming the national champion in both the 200m and 400m events. That same year, she claimed a gold medal in the mixed 4 × 400 m relay at the African Championships in Douala. In 2025, she earned a bronze medal in the women's 4 × 400 m relay at the World Athletics Relays in Guangzhou.

As of 2025, she holds South African national records in the 300m (36.36), the mixed 4 × 400 m relay (3:13.12), and the women's 4 × 400 m relay (3:24.84).

== Career ==
She finished fourth overall with the South African team at the 2022 Commonwealth Games in Birmingham, England, in the women's 4 x 400 metres relay. However, she suffered with injury during parts of 2022 and 2023. She won the South African Athletics Championships over 200 metres and 400 metres in Pietermaritzburg in April 2024, running a personal best 52.77 seconds.

She was a gold medalist in the mixed 4 x 400 metres at the 2024 African Championships in Douala, Cameroon alongside Gardeo Isaacs, Mthi Mthimkulu and Miranda Coetzee in 3:13.12, breaking the South African national record. She finished fourth overall in the individual 400 metres and fifth in the final of the individual 200 metres at the same championships.

In February 2025, she ran a South African national record 36.36 seconds over 300 metres. In March 2025, in Tshwane, she was a member of South African women's 4 × 400 m relay team which broke the nine-year-old national record alongside Coetzee, Marlie Viljoen and Zenéy Geldenhuys who ran 3:28.30 which took 0.19 off the previous best mark of 3:28.49 which was set by Caster Semenya, Jeanelle Griessel, Wenda Nel and Justine Palframan at the African Athletics Championships in Durban in 2016.

She was part of the South African women's 4 x 400 metres relay team which ran a 3:24.84 national record to place third at the 2025 World Athletics Relays in China. She also competed in the Mixed 4 × 400 metres relay at the event.

She was selected for the 2025 World Athletics Championships in Tokyo, Japan, where she ran in the women's 400 metres and the women's 4 x 400 metres relay.
