= Rhoda Njobvu =

Zambian athlete (born 1994)

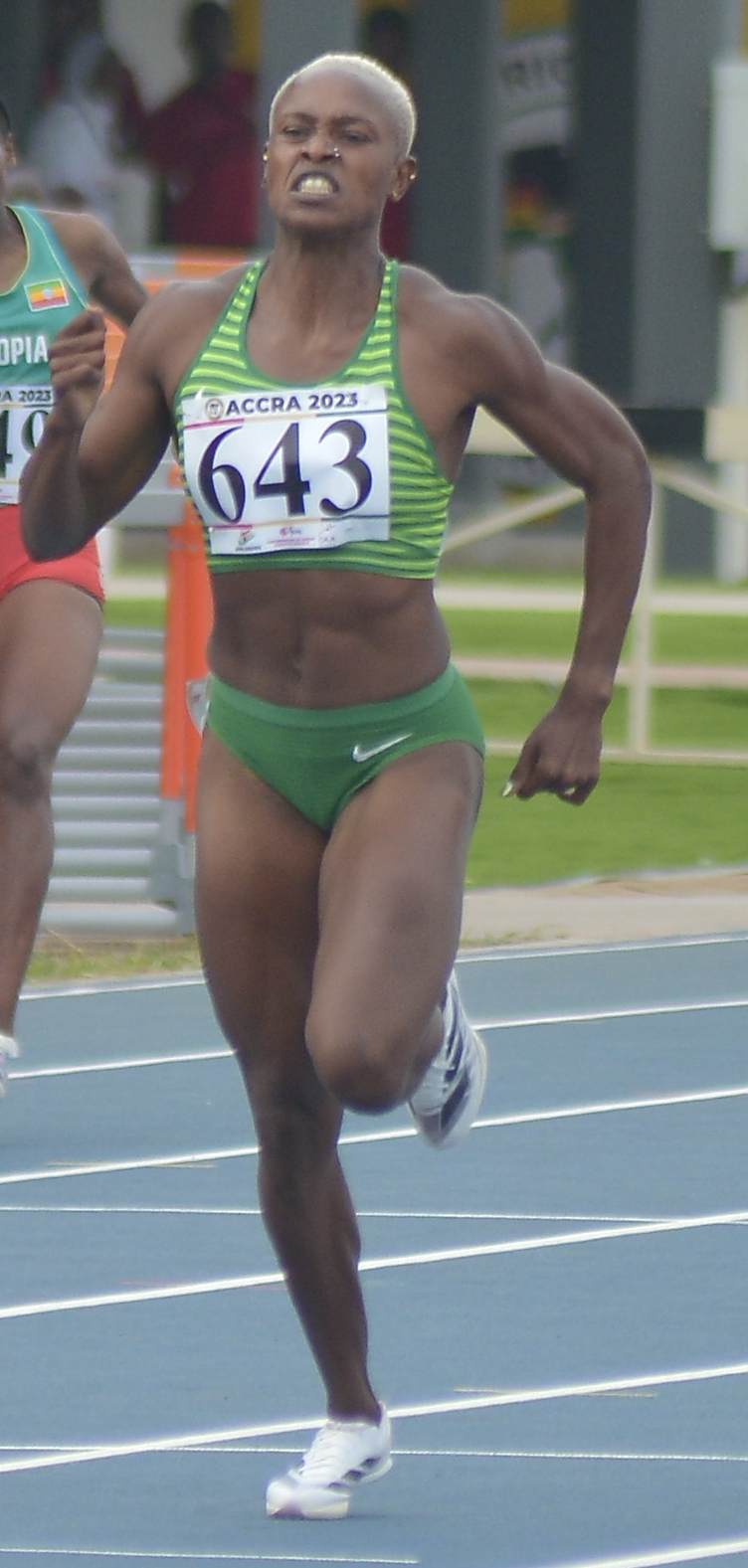
- Rhoda Njobvu in 2024

Personal information
- Full name: Rhoda Njobvu
- Nationality: Zambian
- Born: 29 January 1994 (age 32) Lusaka, Zambia

Sport
- Country: Zambia
- Sport: Track and field
- Events: 100 metres 200 metres 4 × 100 metres relay
Medal record
Women's athletics
Representing Zambia
African Games
Silver medal – second place	2023 Accra	4 × 400 m relay
African Championships
Silver medal – second place	2024 Douala	4 × 400 m relay
Bronze medal – third place	2018 Asaba	4 × 400 m relay
Bronze medal – third place	2022 Saint Pierre	200 m

Rhoda Njobvu (born 29 January 1994) is a Zambian and ZNS sponsored athlete specialising in the 100m, 200m, and 4 × 100 m relay events. She has represented Zambia at various international competitions, including the 2014 Commonwealth Games, the 2016 African Championships, and the 2018 African Championships, where she won a bronze medal in the 4 × 400 m relay, setting a national record with a time of 3:38.18 minutes.

In 2021, Njobvu achieved a personal best of 11.12 seconds in the 100m, briefly sharing the fastest time in the world that year. She also set a national record of 22.69 seconds in the 200m, thereby qualifying for the 2020 Tokyo Olympics in both events. Although she did not advance to the semifinals in either event at the Olympics, she went on to compete at the 2022 Commonwealth Games, reaching the semifinals in the 200m.

== Athletics career ==
Njobvu gained her first international experience at the 2014 Commonwealth Games in Glasgow, where she was eliminated from the 400 m with 57.47 seconds in the first round. In 2016, she made it to the semi-finals at the African Championships in Durban in the 200 m. At the 2018 African Championships in Asaba, Delta, she again reached the semi-finals, this time in the 100 m, in addition, she won the bronze medal in the 4 × 400 m relay, setting a national record in the process with 3:38.18 min.

In May 2021, she competed at the World Athletics Relays in Chorzów, Poland. She and her colleagues missed the finals after running 44.81 s in the preliminary round in May 2021.

In 2021 she posted a personal best at the 100 m, which at 11.12 was briefly the leading time in the world, tied with Tiana Wilson before it was beaten by Nzubechi Grace Nwokocha. It also secured her spot at the delayed 2020 Tokyo Olympics. Shortly afterward, she increased her record over 200 m to 22:69 improving Kabange Mupopo's previous national record from 2017 by almost half a second, and qualified for the 200 m at the 2020 Summer Olympics as well. Njobvu did not reach the semi-finals at the Olympics in either event. Njobvu ran both events at the 2022 Commonwealth Games and reached the semi-finals in the 200 m race where she finished fourth in her race running 23.72 seconds and had the fourteenth fastest time overall.

== Personal life / Controversy ==
In July 2025, an intimate video allegedly featuring Sergeant Rhoda Njobvu and a Zambia Correctional Service officer was leaked online. The Zambia Police Service confirmed an investigation under Section 177 of the Penal Code—citing “immoral and indecent conduct”—and issued a warning against sharing the footage. Concurrently, the Zambia National Service (ZNS) initiated internal disciplinary proceedings, with the chief public relations officer expressing that the incident violated institutional values and expressed disappointment Zambian. Zambia Athletics also formed a three-member committee to verify the authenticity of the video and investigate its circumstances. Njobvu publicly apologized, stating she was “ashamed and sorry,” and emphasized that the video's release was non-consensual.

== Statistics ==
=== Personal best ===
- Information from World Athletics profile unless otherwise noted.
- 100 Meter: 11.12s (-0.5 m/s), 20 March 2021 in Lusaka NR
- 200 Meter: 22.69s (-0.2 m/s), 10 April 2021 in Lusaka NR

=== International competitions ===
Year	Competition	Venue	Position	Event	Notes
2018	African Championships	Asaba, Nigeria	3rd	4 × 400 m relay	3:38.18 NR
2022	African Championships	Port Louis, Mauritius	3rd	200 m	– (bronze)
2023	African Games	Accra, Ghana	2nd	4 × 400 m relay	3:31.85 min (Sf/Final combined)
2023	World Championships	Budapest, Hungary	Heats • 7th	200 m	23.82 s
2024	African Championships	Douala, Cameroon	2nd	4 × 400 m relay	3:32.18 min
