= Nigeria at the 2019 African Games =

- Flag of Nigeria
- IOC code: NGR
- NOC: Nigerian Olympic Committee

in Rabat, Morocco 19 August 2019 – 31 August 2019
- Competitors: 308 (153 men and 155 women) in 22 sports
- Flag bearer: Segun Toriola
- Medals Ranked 2nd: Gold 46 Silver 36 Bronze 48 Total 130

African Games appearances (overview)
- 1965; 1973; 1978; 1987; 1991; 1995; 1999; 2003; 2007; 2011; 2015; 2019; 2023

Nigeria competed at the 2019 African Games held from 19 to 31 August 2019 in Rabat, Morocco. In total, 308 athletes represented Nigeria at the games. Athletes representing Nigeria won 46 gold medals, 33 silver medals and 48 bronze medals and the country finished 2nd in the medal table.

== Medal summary ==
Medals by sport
Sport	1st place, gold medalist(s)	2nd place, silver medalist(s)	3rd place, bronze medalist(s)	Total
3x3 basketball	1	0	1	2
Athletics	10	7	6	23
Badminton	2	3	3	8
Boxing	1	1	5	7
Canoeing	4	0	0	4
Football	1	1	0	2
Gymnastics	1	0	2	3
Karate	0	0	1	1
Table tennis	2	4	4	10
Taekwondo	1	0	5	6
Tennis	0	0	2	2
Weightlifting	16	16	18	50
Wrestling	7	4	1	12
Total	46	36	48	130

=== Medal table ===
Medal	Name	Sport	Event	Date
Gold	Fummanya Ijeh; Abel Marvellous; Murjanatu Musa; Ifunanya Okoro	3x3 basketball	Women's tournament	25 August
Gold	Raymond Ekevwo	Athletics	Men's 100 metres	27 August
Gold	Chukwuebuka Enekwechi	Athletics	Men's shot put	27 August
Gold	Oluwatobiloba Amusan	Athletics	Women's 100 metres hurdles	28 August
Gold	Joy Udo-Gabriel; Mercy Ntia-Obong; Jasper Bukola Adekunle; Rosemary Chukwuma; Blessing Okagbare	Athletics	Women's 4 × 100 metres relay	28 August
Gold	Kelechi Nwanaga	Athletics	Women's javelin throw	28 August
Gold	Ese Brume	Athletics	Women's long jump	29 August
Gold	Kemi Francis; Patience Okon George; Blessing Oladoye; Favour Ofili	Athletics	Women's 4 × 400 metres relay	30 August
Gold	Women's team	Football	Women's tournament	30 August
Silver	Oyeniyi Abejoye	Athletics	Men's 110 metres hurdles	27 August
Silver	Raymond Ekevwo; Divine Oduduru; Emmanuel Arowolo; Usheoritse Itsekiri; Ogho-Oghene Egwero; Adeseye Ogunlewe	Athletics	Men's 4 × 100 metres relay	28 August
Silver	Bose Samuel	Wrestling	Women's freestyle 53 kg	29 August
Silver	Soso Tamarau	Wrestling	Men's freestyle 97 kg	29 August
Silver	Divine Oduduru	Athletics	Men's 200 metres	30 August
Silver	Men's team	Football	Men's tournament	30 August
Bronze	Peace Godwin; Kanyinsola Odufuwa; Mustapha Oyebanji; Chukwunonso Udemezue	3x3 basketball	Men's tournament	25 August
Bronze	Usheoritse Itsekiri	Athletics	Men's 100 metres	27 August
Bronze	Chidi Okezie	Athletics	Men's 400 metres	28 August
Bronze	Adesuwa Osabuohien; Barakat Quadre	Tennis	Women's doubles	28 August
Bronze	Tochukwu Okeke	Wrestling	Men's Greco-Roman 87 kg	28 August
Bronze	Adesuwa Osabuohien; Barakat Quadre; Blessing Samuel Audu; Aanu Enita Mercy Aiyegbusi	Tennis	Women's team event	31 August

== 3x3 basketball ==
Nigeria competed in 3x3 basketball. The men's team won the bronze medal in the men's tournament and the women's team took home the gold medal in the women's tournament.

== Athletics ==
In total, 51 Nigerian athletes were selected for competing in athletics at the 2019 African Games.

=== Male athletes ===
- Divine Oduduru
- Seye Ogunlewe
- Oyeniyi Abejoye
- Enoch Adegoke
- Shedrack Akpeki
- Rilwan Alowonle
- Emmanuel Arowolo
- Nnamdi Chinecherem
- Ogho-Oghene Egwero
- Raymond Ekevwo
- Chukwuebuka Enekwechi
- Orukpe Eraiyokan
- Edose Ibadin
- Usheoritse Itsekiri
- Samuel Kure
- Samson Nathaniel
- Ayomidotun Ogundeji
- Ifeanyi Ojeli
- Chidi Okezie
- Aiyowieren Osadolor
- Sikiru Adeyemi
- Best Ephire

=== Female athletes ===
- Blessing Okagbare
- Ese Brume
- Bukola Adekunle
- Uwemedino Abasiono Akpan
- Aniekeme Alphonsus
- Doreen Amata
- Tobi Amusan
- Grace Anigbata
- Rosemary Chukwuma
- Oluwakemi Francis
- Patience Okon George
- Esther Isiah
- Princess Kara
- Mercy Ntia-Obong
- Kelechi Nwanaga
- Queen Obisesan
- Favour Ofili
- Revelation Ogini
- Blessing Ogundiran
- Temilola Ogunrinde
- Oyesade Olatoye
- Fadekemi Olude
- Chioma Onyekwere
- Rita Ossai
- Joy Udo-Gabriel
- Amarachi Obi
- Blessing Oladoye
- Grace Nwokocha

=== Results ===
In total ten gold medals, seven silver medals and six bronze medals were won and the country finished 1st in the athletics medal table.

Raymond Ekevwo won the gold medal in the men's 100 metres event and Usheoritse Itsekiri won the bronze medal in that event.

Divine Oduduru won the gold medal in the men's 200 metres event.

Chidi Okezie won the bronze medal in the men's 400 metres event.

Oyeniyi Abejoye won the silver medal in the men's 110 metres hurdles event.

Nigeria won the silver medal in the men's 4 × 100 metres relay event and Nigeria won the bronze medal in the men's 4 × 400 metres relay event. Chukwuebuka Enekwechi won the gold medal in the men's shot put event.

Dotun Ogundeji won the silver medal in the men's discus throw event.

== Badminton ==
Nigeria competed in badminton. Twelve players registered in the mixed team event, and won the mixed team gold after beat Algeria with the score 3–0 in the final on 25 August.

Anuoluwapo Juwon Opeyori won the gold medal in the men's singles event. Godwin Olofua won a bronze medal in that event. Together they won the silver medal in the men's doubles event.

Dorcas Ajoke Adesokan won the silver medal in the women's singles event. Sofiat Arinola Obanishola won a bronze medal in that event.

Dorcas Ajoke Adesokan and Uchechukwu Deborah Ukeh won the silver medal in the women's doubles event.

Enejoh Abah and Peace Orji won a bronze medal in the mixed doubles event.

== Boxing ==
Nigeria competed in boxing. Boxers representing Nigeria won one gold medal, one silver medal and five bronze medals and the country finished in 5th place in the boxing medal table.

Bolanle Temitope Shogbamu won the gold medal in the women's welterweight (69kg) event.

Abdul-afeez Ayoola Osoba won the silver medal in the men's welterweight (69kg) event.

Solomon Adebayo won a bronze medal in the men's super heavyweight (+91kg) event.

Ayisat Morenikeji Oriyomi won a bronze medal in the women's flyweight (51kg) event.

Elizabeth Temitayo Oshoba won a bronze medal in the women's featherweight (57kg) event.

Fadilat Tijani won a bronze medal in the women's lightweight (60kg) event.

Toyin Adejumola won a bronze medal in the women's middleweight (75kg) event.

== Canoeing ==
Nigeria competed in canoeing.

Ayomide Emmanuel Bello won the gold medals in the women's C-1 200 metres and C-1 500 metres events. As a result of Bello's win in the C-1 200 metres event Nigeria qualified a single boat in canoeing for the 2020 Summer Olympics. Bello and Tubereferia Goodness Foloki also won the gold medals in the women's C-2 200 metres and C-2 500 metres events.

== Chess ==
Nigeria competed in chess. Four chess players competed: Oladapo Olutola Adu, Toritsemuwa Ofowino, Perpetual Eloho Ogbiyoyo and Abimbola Ayotomiwa Osunfuyi. They did not win any medals.

== Cycling ==
Nigeria competed both in road cycling and mountain bike cycling.

== Football ==
Nigeria competed in football at the 2019 African Games, both in the men's tournament and the women's tournament. The men's team won the silver medal and the women's team won the gold medal.

== Gymnastics ==
Uche Eke, born in America, represented Nigeria at the 2019 African Games in gymnastics. He won Nigeria's first ever gold medal in gymnastics, in the pommel horse event and a bronze medal in the parallel bars event. The women's team also won the bronze medal in the team all-around event.

== Judo ==
Eight athletes were scheduled to compete in judo. In total, four athletes competed in judo: Michael Agbo, Victoria Agbodobiri, David Damilare Joseph and Sarah Echi Umar.

== Handball ==
Both Nigeria's national handball team and women's national handball team competed in handball at the 2019 African Games.

The men's team reached the quarterfinals and finished in 6th place.

The women's team finished in 9th place.

== Karate ==
Nigeria competed in karate. Eight athletes were scheduled to compete: Hope Adele, Rustum Francis Bernard, Blessing James, Rita Omoshuka Ogene, Elizabeth Komeno Oghenevwogaga, Aderonke Oluwatosin Ogunsanwo, Oluwaseun Benjamin Olorunbe and Joseph Olima Omu.

Hope Adele won one of the bronze medals in the men's kumite +84 kg event.

== Rowing ==
Nigeria is scheduled to compete in rowing. Eight athletes are scheduled to compete: David Richard Bello, Janet Deborah David, Michael Akpos Moses, Glory Abu Semidara, Adeola Tibiebiere Smart, Samuel Eboibue Suku, Esther Tamaramiyebi Toko and Sadiq Yahaya.

== Shooting ==
Nigeria is scheduled to compete in shooting. Madu Abdul, Elaochi Evans Adoyi, Okposo Esugo and Kate Iruoghene Otiti are scheduled to compete.

== Swimming ==
Nigeria competed in swimming. Four swimmers were scheduled to compete: Phillip Adejumo, Timipame-ere Akiayefa, Abibat Moyosore Ogunbanwo and Yellow Naikegy Yeiyah.

== Table tennis ==
Nigeria competed in table tennis.

Quadri Aruna and Olufunke Oshonaike were scheduled to compete in table tennis.

In the men's singles event Olajide Omotayo won the gold medal, Quadri Aruna won the silver medal and Segun Toriola won a bronze medal.

Toriola and Olajide Omotayo won a bronze medal in the men's doubles event.

Aruna, Toriola and Omotayo also won the silver medal in the men's team event.

== Taekwondo ==
Nigerian athletes competed in Taekwondo. In total, one gold medal and five bronze medals were won and the country finished in 6th place in the Taekwondo medal table.

== Tennis ==
Nigeria competed in tennis. Eight tennis players were scheduled to compete: Aanu Enita Mercy Aiyegbusi, Blessing Samuel Audu, Emmanuel Sunday Audu, Sylvester Emmanuel, Adesuwa Osabuohien, Thomas Omang Otuu, Barakat Quadre and Joseph Imeh Ubong.

Barakat Quadre and Adesuwa Osabuohien won a bronze medal in the women's doubles event.

Together with Blessing Samuel Audu and Aanu Enita Mercy Aiyegbusi they also won a bronze medal in the women's team event.

== Volleyball ==
Nigeria's men's team competed in the men's tournament. The women's team competed in the women's tournament.

== Weightlifting ==
Nigeria competed in weightlifting. In total, weightlifters representing Nigeria won 16 gold medals, 13 silver medals and 18 bronze medals and the country finished 2nd in the weightlifting medal table.

== Wrestling ==
Nigeria competed in wrestling.

Odunayo Adekuoroye, Blessing Oborududu, Aminat Adeniyi, Blessing Onyebuchi, Mercy Genesis, Bose Samuel, Amas Daniel, Sinivie Boltic, Soso Tamarau, Melvin Bibo, Ebikewenimo Welson, Ogbonna John, Emmanuel Nworie, Ikechukwu Robinson, Tochukwu Okeke and Alfred Pakistan were scheduled to represent Nigeria at the 2019 African Games in wrestling.
