= African U18 Championships in Athletics =

African athletics competition

African Youth Athletics Championships
- Status: active
- Genre: sports event
- Date: midyear
- Frequency: biennial
- Inaugurated: 2013
- Organiser: Confederation of African Athletics

The African Youth Athletics Championships is a biennial continental athletics competition for African athletes, organised by the Confederation of African Athletics. First held in 2013, it is a youth category event open to athletes aged fifteen to seventeen in the year of competition.

The competition was the third continental athletics competition to be created for that age level, following in the steps of the South American and Oceanian events. Its proposal, coming at a similar time as that for the European Athletics Youth Championships, marked a growing interest in international competition for younger people.

== Editions ==
	Year	City	Country	Date	Venue	No. of events	No. of athletes	Leading nation
1	2013	Warri	Nigeria	28–31 March	Warri Township Stadium	36		Nigeria
2	2015	Reduit	Mauritius	23–26 April	Maryse Justin Stadium	38	350	South Africa
3	2019	Abidjan	Ivory Coast	16–20 April	Stade Félix Houphouët-Boigny	39		South Africa
4	2023	Ndola	Zambia	29 April – 3 May	Levy Mwanawasa Stadium	41		South Africa
5	2025	Abeokuta	Nigeria	16–20 July	MKO Abiola Sports Complex	41		South Africa

== Championships records ==
=== Boys ===
Event	Record	Athlete	Nationality	Date	Championships	Place	Ref.
100 m	10.47 A (−1.6 m/s)	Werner Bezuidenhout	South Africa	30 April 2023	2023 Championships	Ndola, Zambia	
200 m	20.52 (±0.0 m/s)	Sinesipho Dambile	South Africa	19 April 2019	2019 Championships	Abidjan, Ivory Coast	
400 m	46.01 A	Samuel Uchenna Ogazi	Nigeria	30 April 2023	2023 Championships	Ndola, Zambia	
800 m	1:46.54	Guirreh Abdo Razakhassan	Djibouti	20 April 2019	2019 Championships	Abidjan, Ivory Coast	
1500 m	3:41.96	Robert Biwott	Kenya	29 March 2013	2013 Championships	Warri, Nigeria	
3000 m	7:56.29	Davis Kiplangat	Kenya	25 April 2015	2015 Championships	Moka, Mauritius	
110 m hurdles (91.4 cm)	13.26	Phenyo Miyen	South Africa	July 2025	2025 Championships	Abeokuta, Nigeria	
400 m hurdles	51.36 A	Matodzi Ndo	South Africa	3 May 2023	2023 Championships	Ndola, Zambia	
2000 m steeplechase	5:35.47	Takele Bikila Tadese	Ethiopia	17 April 2019	2019 Championships	Abidjan, Ivory Coast	
High jump	2.10 m A	Luke van der Merwe	South Africa	29 April 2023	2023 Championships	Ndola, Zambia	
Long jump	7.41 (−0.4 m/s)	Muchine Khoua	Morocco	24 April 2015	2015 Championships	Moka, Mauritius	
Triple jump	15.70 m A (−0.1 m/s)	Precious Ugo Irivi	Nigeria	2 May 2023	2023 Championships	Ndola, Zambia	
Shot put (5 kg)	20.89 m	Burger Lambrechts jr	South Africa	24 April 2015	2015 Championships	Moka, Mauritius	
Discus throw (1.5 kg)	64.88 m	Werner Visser	South Africa	23 April 2015	2015 Championships	Moka, Mauritius	
Javelin throw (700 g)	74.71 m	Chinekerem Nnadji	Nigeria	19 April 2019	2019 Championships	Abidjan, Ivory Coast	
Octathlon	5363 pts	Bryan Tonta	Mauritius	23 April 2015	2015 Championships	Moka, Mauritius	
Octathlon	100m (wind) / Long jump (wind) / Shot put / 400m / 110m H (wind) / High jump / Javelin / 1000m; 11.29 (+0.4 m/s) / 6.57 m (−0.5 m/s) / 11.59 m / 52.72 / 14.58 (±0.0 m/s) / 1.93 m / 31.20 m / 3:04.61						
10,000 m walk	46:09.53	Pierre Vermaak	South Africa	26 April 2015	2015 Championships	Moka, Mauritius	
Swedish relay	1:53.35	Ebrima Camara; Alieu Joof; Sonko Alagie; Keita Tijani	Gambia	31 March 2013	2013 Championships	Warri, Nigeria	

=== Girls ===
Event	Record	Athlete	Nationality	Date	Championships	Place	Ref.
100 m	11.53 A (−1.4 m/s)	Faith Okwose	Nigeria	30 April 2023	2023 Championships	Ndola, Zambia	
200 m	23.31 A (−0.2 m/s)	Faith Okwose	Nigeria	2 May 2023	2023 Championships	Ndola, Zambia	
400 m	52.28	Favour Ofili	Nigeria	17 April 2019	2019 Championships	Abidjan, Ivory Coast	
800 m	2:05.05	Zeyituna Mohammed Aliyi	Ethiopia	29 March 2013	2013 Championships	Warri, Nigeria	
1500 m	4:10.73 A	Nancy Cherop	Kenya	29 April 2023	2023 Championships	Ndola, Zambia	
3000 m	9:10.57	Emily Chebet	Kenya	23 April 2015	2015 Championships	Moka, Mauritius	
100 m hurdles (0.76 m)	13.30 (+1.0 m/s)	Taylon Bieldt	South Africa	24 April 2015	2015 Championships	Moka, Mauritius	
400 m hurdles	59.22	Taylon Bieldt	South Africa	26 April 2015	2015 Championships	Moka, Mauritius	
2000 m steeplechase	6:20.47	Sandra Felis Chebet	Kenya	25 April 2015	2015 Championships	Moka, Mauritius	
High jump	1.80 m	Rhizlane Siba	Morocco	30 March 2013	2013 Championships	Warri, Nigeria	
Pole vault	3.80 m A	Ansume de Beer	South Africa	30 April 2023	2023 Championships	Ndola, Zambia	
Long jump	6.08 m A (−0.5 m/s)	Timeke-Jade Coetzee	South Africa	1 May 2023	2023 Championships	Ndola, Zambia	
Triple jump	12.56 m	Kasie Veronica Ugeh	Nigeria	March 2013	2013 Championships	Warri, Nigeria	
Shot put	14.95 m	Yolandi Stander	South Africa	23 April 2015	2015 Championships	Moka, Mauritius	
Discus throw	50.10 m A	Alicia Khunou	South Africa	30 April 2023	2023 Championships	Ndola, Zambia	
Hammer throw	63.51 m	Phetinsag Makhethe	South Africa	20 April 2019	2019 Championships	Abidjan, Ivory Coast	
Javelin throw (500 g)	51.57 m	Heike De Nyssechen	South Africa	19 April 2019	2019 Championships	Abidjan, Ivory Coast	
Heptathlon	4733 pts	Sylvia Schulz	Namibia	25 April 2015	2015 Championships	Moka, Mauritius	
Heptathlon	100m H (wind) / High jump / Shot put / 200m (wind) / Long jump (wind) / Javelin / 800m; 15.04 (+1.1 m/s) / 1.57 m / 9.24 m / 26.19 (+3.1 m/s) / 5.24 m / 30.45 m / 2:19.94						
5000 m walk	25:20.28	Fadakemi Floren Olude	Nigeria	26 April 2015	2015 Championships	Moka, Mauritius	
Swedish relay	2:08.71	Omotayo Abolaji; Aniekeme Alphonsus; Blessing Adiakerenwa; Praise Idamadudu	Nigeria	24 April 2015	2015 Championships	Moka, Mauritius	
