= 2019 African U18 and U20 Championships in Athletics =

African U18 and U20 Championships
- Dates: 16–20 April
- Host city: Abidjan, Ivory Coast
- Venue: Stade Félix Houphouët-Boigny
- Level: U20 and U18
- Events: 42 U20 & 39 U18

The 2019 African U20 Championships in Athletics was the fourteenth edition of the biennial, continental athletics tournament for African athletes aged 19 years or younger, for the first time held jointly with the African U18 Championships in Athletics. It was held at the Stade Félix Houphouët-Boigny in Abidjan, Ivory Coast, between 16 and 20 April.

== Medal table ==
* Host nation (Ivory Coast)

| Rank | NOC | Gold | Silver | Bronze | Total |
|---|---|---|---|---|---|
| 1 | South Africa (RSA) | 26 | 20 | 10 | 56 |
| 2 | Kenya (KEN) | 17 | 16 | 11 | 44 |
| 3 | Nigeria (NGR) | 13 | 6 | 13 | 32 |
| 4 | Egypt (EGY) | 7 | 7 | 6 | 20 |
| 5 | Ethiopia (ETH) | 6 | 10 | 14 | 30 |
| 6 | Algeria (ALG) | 5 | 4 | 4 | 13 |
| 7 | Gambia (GAM) | 1 | 4 | 3 | 8 |
| 8 | Morocco (MAR) | 1 | 4 | 0 | 5 |
| 9 | Senegal (SEN) | 1 | 2 | 1 | 4 |
| 10 | Ghana (GHA) | 1 | 1 | 2 | 4 |
| 11 | Uganda (UGA) | 1 | 1 | 1 | 3 |
| 12 | Tunisia (TUN) | 1 | 0 | 4 | 5 |
| 13 | Djibouti (DJI) | 1 | 0 | 0 | 1 |
| 14 | Seychelles (SEY) | 0 | 2 | 0 | 2 |
| 15 | Ivory Coast (CIV)* | 0 | 1 | 2 | 3 |
| 16 | Cameroon (CMR) | 0 | 1 | 1 | 2 |
| 16 | Mauritius (MRI) | 0 | 1 | 1 | 2 |
| 18 | Zambia (ZAM) | 0 | 1 | 0 | 1 |
| 19 | Burkina Faso (BUR) | 0 | 0 | 3 | 3 |
| 20 | Namibia (NAM) | 0 | 0 | 2 | 2 |
| 21 | Zimbabwe (ZIM) | 0 | 0 | 1 | 1 |
| Totals (21 entries) | | 81 | 81 | 79 | 241 |

== Medal summary ==
=== Men (U20) ===
| Event | Gold | | Silver | | Bronze | |
|---|---|---|---|---|---|---|
| 100 metres (Wind: +0.5 m/s) | Enoch Adegoke (NGR) | 10.29 CR | Shaun Maswanganyi (RSA) | 10.35 | Luke Davids (RSA) | 10.35 |
| 200 metres (Wind: -0.1 m/s) | Shaun Maswanganyi (RSA) | 20.77 | Luke Davids (RSA) | 20.98 | Edwin Kwabla Gadayi (GHA) | 21.04 |
| 400 metres | Modou Lamine Bah (GAM) | 46.91 | Luyando Mudenda (ZAM) | 47.37 | Mustefa Edeo Kabeto (ETH) | 47.49 |
| 800 metres | Kipngetich Ngeno (KEN) | 1:45.25 CR | Joseph Rotiken (KEN) | 1:46.51 | Edrissa Marong (GAM) | 1:47.20 NR |
| 1500 metres | George Manangoi (KEN) | 3:47.55 | Nickson Lesiyia (KEN) | 3:48.87 | Melese Nberet (ETH) | 3:49.64 |
| 5000 metres | Edward Zakayo (KEN) | 13:13.06 CR | Jacob Krop (KEN) | 13:14.44 | Reuben Pogisho (KEN) | 13:43.46 |
| 10,000 metres | Bravin Kipkogei Kiptoo (KEN) | 28:17.06 | Samuel Kibet (UGA) | 28:22.26 | Emmanuel Kiprotich Korir (KEN) | 28:26.46 |
| 110 metres hurdles (99 cm) (Wind: +0.6 m/s) | Michael Schoeman (RSA) | 14.00 | Jeremie Lararaudeuse (MRI) | 14.06 | Mamadou Sakho (SEN) | 14.54 |
| 400 metres hurdles | Sokwakhana Zazini (RSA) | 50.35 | Ismail Manyani (MAR) | 51.16 | Gadisa Bayu (ETH) | 51.82 |
| 3000 metres steeplechase | Leonard Bett (KEN) | 8:25.60 | Brian Kipkoech Limo (KEN) | 8:35.53 | Lamecha Girma (ETH) | 8:48.56 |
| 4×100 metres relay | Nigeria (NGR); Gershon Omubo; Shedrack Akpeki; Alaba Akintola; Enoch Adegoke | 40.21 | Gambia (GAM) | 41.20 | Ivory Coast (CIV) | 42.00 |
| 4×400 metres relay | Kenya (KEN) | 3:10.06 | Ethiopia (ETH) | 3:10.99 | Nigeria (NGR); Nnabukwo Gbaruko; Shedrack Akpeki; Nsikak Okon; Jeremiah Nathaniel | 3:14.15 |
| 10,000 m walk | Dominic Samson Ndigiti (KEN) | 43:27.21 | Abdulrahman Mahmoud (EGY) | 45:20.46 | Mehdi Abidi (ALG) | 46:27.31 |
| High jump | Breyton Poole (RSA) | 2.18 m CR | Bilel Afer (ALG); Lim Koung Duop (ETH) | 2.06 m | Not awarded | |
| Pole vault | Valko van Wyk (RSA) | 4.65 m | Only one finisher | | | |
| Long jump | Omod Okugn (ETH) | 7.35 m | Remember Afaxoe (GHA) | 7.28 m | Bekele Jilo (ETH) | 7.28 m |
| Triple jump | Adir Gur (ETH) | 15.77 m | Kangogo (KEN) | 15.65 m | Prosper Dezardin (MRI) | 15.33 m (w) |
| Shot put (6 kg) | Motaz Mohamed El Said (EGY) | 19.21 m | Chris van Niekerk (RSA) | 18.40 m | Ryan Williams (NAM) | 16.02 m |
| Discus throw (1.75 kg) | Chris van Niekerk (RSA) | 56.49 m | Francois Prinsloo (RSA) | 55.79 m | Ryan Williams (NAM) | 53.37 m |
| Hammer throw (6 kg) | Youssef Hesham Mohamed (EGY) | 65.09 m | Ali Hesham Mohamed Ahmed (EGY) | 64.85 m | Cedric Botshello Kobokane (RSA) | 61.01 m |
| Decathlon (U20) | Mohamed Zadi (ALG) | 6373 pts | El Sayed Ramy Ahmed (EGY) | ? | Erewa Peremobowei Law (NGR) | ? |

=== Women (U20) ===
| Event | Gold | | Silver | | Bronze | |
|---|---|---|---|---|---|---|
| 100 metres (Wind: +0.2 m/s) | Rosemary Chukwuma (NGR) | 11.62 | Rose Xeyi (RSA) | 11.75 | Grace Nwokocha (NGR) | 11.88 |
| 200 metres (Wind: +0.5 m/s) | Rosemary Chukwuma (NGR) | 23.81 | Antoinette van der Merwe (RSA) | 23.97 | Esther Peter Okon (NGR) | 24.20 |
| 400 metres | Mary Moraa (KEN) | 53.57 | Sara Ehachimi (MAR) | 55.02 | Glory Patrick Okon (NGR) | 55.18 |
| 800 metres | Jackline Wambui (KEN) | 2:04.29 | Hirut Meshesha (ETH) | 2:04.70 | Lydia Jerito (KEN) | 2:04.78 |
| 1500 metres | Diribe Welteji (ETH) | 4:11.59 | Edinah Jebitok (KEN) | 4:13.02 | Mercyline Cherono (KEN) | 4:15.95 |
| 3000 metres | Alemitu Tariku (ETH) | 9:33.53 | Emmaculate Anyango (KEN) | 9:36.05 | Tsihan Haile (ETH) | 9:37.06 |
| 5000 metres | Beatrice Chebet (KEN) | 16:02.66 | Dolphine Omare (KEN) | 16:07.42 | Sarah Chelangat (UGA) | 16:09.96 |
| 100 metres hurdles (Wind: +0.7 m/s) | Rogail Joseph (RSA) | 13.97 | Antoinette van der Merwe (RSA) | 14.09 | Victoria Adunbi (NGR) | 14.42 |
| 400 metres hurdles | Rogail Joseph (RSA) | 57.37 CR | Gontse Morake (RSA) | 58.85 | Loubna Benhadja (ALG) | 59.18 |
| 3000 metres steeplechase | Fancy Cherono (KEN) | 9:48.56 CR | Karen Chebet (KEN) | 9:51.41 | Lomi Teferea (ETH) | 10:12.18 |
| 4×100 metres relay | Nigeria (NGR); Grace Nwokocha; Stella Ayanleke; Esther Okon; Rosemary Chukwuma | 45.56 | South Africa (RSA) | 46.36 | Ivory Coast (CIV) | 47.84 |
| 4×400 metres relay | Ethiopia (ETH) | 3:39.82 | South Africa (RSA) | 4:40.54 | Nigeria (NGR); Blessing Oladoye; Blessing Ovwighonadjebere; Glory Patrick; Juliana Abayomi | 4:41.86 |
| 10,000 m walk | Rihem Bouzid (TUN) | 51:47.8 | Betwe Gerahunmar (ETH) | 52:19.1 | Masire Teshagesinta (ETH) | 53:47.9 |
| High jump | Rose Yeboah (GHA) | 1.83 m | Natacha Chetty (SEY) | 1.77 m | Kristi Snyman (RSA) | 1.75 m |
| Pole vault | Isra Moradhi (EGY) | 3.30 m | Yasmeen Hazeem (EGY) | 3.30 m | Imen Rhouma (TUN) | 3.30 m |
| Long jump | Faith Jepkemboi Kipsang (KEN) | 5.83 m | Rose Xeyi (RSA) | 5.81 m | Victory George (ETH) | 5.70 m |
| Triple jump | Onaara Obamuwagun (NGR) | 12.78 m | Gontse Morake (RSA) | 12.47 m | Dorothy Kavumba (ZIM) | 12.41 m |
| Discus throw | Princess Kara (NGR) | 50.04 m | Rima Ahmed (EGY) | 46.95 m | Tsehaye Teklu (ETH) | 45.93 m |
| Hammer throw | Rawan Ayman Ibrahim Barakat (EGY) | 60.83 m CR | Zeroual Zineb (MAR) | 47.34 m | Abdelafou Zainab (TUN) | 42.10 m |
| Javelin throw | Josephine Lalam (UGA) | 49.78 m | Savannah Combrink (RSA) | 46.84 m | Dorothy Roro (KEN) | 45.69 m |
| Heptathlon | Ouidad Yesli (ALG) | 4431 pts | Blessing Ovwighonadjebere (NGR) | 4320 pts | Hania Abdalah (ALG) | 4148 pts |

=== Boys (U18) ===
| Event | Gold | | Silver | | Bronze | |
|---|---|---|---|---|---|---|
| 100 metres (Wind: +0.7 m/s) | Thabang Hlohlolo (RSA) | 10.61 | Eckhardt Potgieter (RSA) | 10.64 | Vuyo Ndlovu (RSA) | 10.65 |
| 200 metres (Wind: 0.0 m/s) | Sinesipho Dambile (RSA) | 20.52 CR | Eckhardt Potgieter (RSA) | 21.29 | Israel Dome Anam (GHA) | 21.42 |
| 400 metres | Lythe Pillay (RSA) | 46.26 CR | Brian Onyari Tinega (KEN) | 46.73 | Antonie Nortje (RSA) | 46.99 |
| 800 metres | Abdo Razack Hassan (DJI) | 1:46.54 CR | Mohamed Ali Gouaned (ALG) | 1:47.88 | Kenneth Kirui (KEN) | 1:47.89 |
| 1500 metres | Vincent Kibet Keter (KEN) | 3:40.28 | Gezahign Yihun (ETH) | 3:43.64 | Peter Kibui Wangari (KEN) | 3:45.50 |
| 3000 metres | Emmanuel Korir Kiplagat (KEN) | 8:14.3 | Gezahign Yihun (ETH) | 8:14.51 | Gideon Kipkertich Ronoh (KEN) | 8:17.83 |
| 110 metres hurdles (91.4 cm) (Wind: +0.1 m/s) | Reinhardt Strauss (RSA) | 13.92 CR | Jorin Leonard Bangue (CMR) | 13.93 | Youssef Badawy (EGY) | 14.17 |
| 400 metres hurdles | Lutodio Custodio (RSA) | 52.53 | Ndikponke Okure (NGR) | 53.39 | Youssef Badawy (EGY) | 53.49 |
| 2000 metres steeplechase | Bikila Tadese (ETH) | 5:35.47 CR | Kibet Chepkwony (KEN) | 5:37.36 | Ronald Kipngetich (KEN) | 5:39.21 |
| Medley relay | South Africa (RSA); Antonie Nortje; Thabang Hlohlo; Lythe Pillay; Sinesipho Dambile | 1:49.50 | Nigeria (NGR) | 1:53.56 | Gambia (GAM) | 1:55.18 |
| 10,000 m walk | Abdenour Ameur (ALG) | 51:15.21 | Osama Hussin Ahmed (EGY) | 52:47.83 | Oussama Aouina (TUN) | 53:19.19 |
| High jump | Best Erhire Omamuyovwi (NGR) | 2.08 m | Joshua Onezime (SEY) | 2.06 m | Ziad Mohamed Kamal (EGY) | 2.04 m |
| Pole vault | Kyer Rademeyer (RSA) | 5.10 m | Nikolam Van Huysteen (RSA) | 4.80 m | Ayndlem Belayabebe (ETH) | 3.60 m |
| Long jump | Jason Tito (RSA) | 7.40 m | Jaugu Sarjo (GAM) | 6.76 m | Olatunde Olaolu (NGR) | 6.60 m |
| Triple jump | Collins Kipkorir (KEN) | 14.82 m | Best Erhire Omamuyovwi (NGR) | 14.77 m | Jason Tito (RSA) | 14.57 m |
| Shot put (5 kg) | Mohamed Osama Mohamed (EGY) | 19.52 m | Douw Kruger (RSA) | 19.03 m | Wynand Swanepoel (RSA) | 17.82 m |
| Discus throw (1.5 kg) | Mohamed Osama Mohamed (EGY) | 58.91 m | Wynand Swanepoel (RSA) | 57.64 m | Douw Kruger (RSA) | 51.10 m |
| Hammer throw (5 kg) | Mohamed Saeed (EGY) | 68.66 m | Abdelmalak Benziada (ALG) | 56.36 m | Mentesnot Mersha (ETH) | 54.19 m |
| Javelin throw (700 g) | Nnamdi Chinecherem (NGR) | 74.71 m CR | Serge Armand Diasso (CIV) | 46.36 m | Losani Konate (BUR) | 43.17 m |
| Octathlon | Ayoub Bansabra (ALG) | 5382 pts | Jordane Quirin (MRI) | 5238 pts | Yusuf Rasheed (NGR) | 5139 pts |

=== Girls (U18) ===
| Event | Gold | | Silver | | Bronze | |
|---|---|---|---|---|---|---|
| 100 metres (Wind: +0.3 m/s) | Miandi van Staden (RSA) | 12.00 | Jalika Bajinka (GAM) | 12.02 | Praise Ofoku (NGR) | 12.02 |
| 200 metres (Wind: +0.3 m/s) | Favour Ofili (NGR) | 23.38 CR | Anita Taviore (NGR) | 24.07 | Binta Jallow (GAM) | 24.13 |
| 400 metres | Favour Ofili (NGR) | 52.28 CR | Linda Kageha (KEN) | 52.52 | Amy Naude (RSA) | 54.29 |
| 800 metres | Prudence Sekgodiso (RSA) | 2:07.03 | Sheila Belio (KEN) | 2:07.45 | Nelly Chepchirchir (KEN) | 2:07.90 |
| 1500 metres | Meryem Azrour (MAR) | 4:20.14 | Janet Nyiva (KEN) | 4:20.43 | Almaz Girma (ETH) | 4:21.97 |
| 3000 metres | Zena Jemutai Yego (KEN) | 9:13.23 | Deborah Chemutai (KEN) | 9:13.42 | Berheteha Amare (ETH) | 9:14.72 |
| 100 metres hurdles (76.2 cm) (Wind: +1.4 m/s) | Kayla van der Bergh (RSA) | 13.50 | Rahil Hamel (ALG) | 14.02 | Madina Toure (BUR) | 14.53 |
| 400 metres hurdles | Sarah Ochigbo (NGR) | 1:03.13 | Saphietou Boye (SEN) | 1:05.97 | Djamilatou Sanou (BUR) | 1:06.24 |
| 2000 metres steeplechase | Juby Jerotich (KEN) | 6:48.56 | Kassazerfe Wondimagegn (ETH) | 6:51.41 | Dorothy Kimutai (KEN) | 7:12.18 |
| Medley relay | Nigeria (NGR) ? ? ? Favour Ofili | 2:11.93 | Gambia (GAM) | 2:12.21 | South Africa (RSA) | 2:12.33 |
| 5000 m walk | Melissa Touloum (ALG) | 25:45.29 | Mariame Worku (ETH) | 26:02.54 | Soumaya Mannai (TUN) | 27:55.83 |
| High jump | Jeanne Visser (RSA) | 1.73 m | Saly Sarr (SEN) | 1.69 m | Laurentine Fouda (CMR) | 1.60 m |
| Long jump | Nolwazi Mashaba (RSA) | 5.82 m | Joane Gerber (RSA) | 5.80 m | Ruona Adogbeji (NGR) | 5.56 m |
| Triple jump | Nolwazi Mashaba (RSA) | 12.65 m | Boru Sambate Robe (ETH) | 12.06 m | Grace Oshiokpu (NGR) | 11.81 m |
| Shot put (3 kg) | Dane Roets (RSA) | 17.33 m | Mine de Klerk (RSA) | 16.90 m | Dina Amel Farouk (EGY) | 13.92 m |
| Discus throw | Dane Roets (RSA) | 46.35 m | Chaimae Bouchaal (MAR) | 41.91 m | Esther Osisike (NGR) | 41.28 m |
| Hammer throw | Phethissang Makhethe (RSA) | 63.51 m CR | Nagla Amel Farouk (EGY) | 56.23 m | Fatima Zohra Tadjine Ikram (ALG) | 53.62 m |
| Javelin throw | Heike de Nyssechen (RSA) | 51.57 m CR | Matha Nthanzi Musai (KEN) | 48.96 m | Shakenaz Zinwefky (EGY) | 42.98 m |
| Heptathlon | Saly Sarr (SEN) | 4005 pts | Ese Awusa (NGR) | 3792 pts | Tamer El Gebaly (EGY) | 3365 pts |
