= Edrissa Marong =

Gambian runner (died 2023)

Medal record
Men's athletics
Representing the Gambia
African Youth Championships
Bronze medal – third place	2015 Reduit	800 m
Bronze medal – third place	2015 Reduit	Medley relay
African U20 Championships
Bronze medal – third place	2019 Abidjan	800 m

Edrissa Marong (1995/1996 – 23 January 2023) was a Gambian middle-distance runner. With a best of 1:47.20, he is the current Gambian national record holder in the 800 metres.

He also represented The Gambia at the African championship in Mauritius in 2022.

Marong died on 23 January 2023, at the age of 27.
