= Princess Kara =

Nigerian athlete (born 2000)

Personal information
- Born: 2 June 2000 (age 26)
- Education: Central Arizona College

Sport
- Country: Nigeria
- Sport: Discus throwing

Achievements and titles
- Regional finals: 2019 African Under 20 Champion
- Personal best: 50.07 m (164 ft 3 1/4 in)
Medal record
African U20 Championships
Gold medal – first place	2019 Abidjan	Discus throw

Princess Kara (born 2000) is a Nigerian discus thrower. She won both the National Championships and the African Under 20 Championships in 2019. Her personal best is 50.07 m (164 ft 3 1/4 in).

== Career ==
Kara participated in the 2016 National Youth Games and has also competed in the triple jump and shot put.

Kara won gold in discus throwing at the 2018 National Sports Festival (NSF) in Abuja. In 2019, she won both the national Under 20 Championships and the African Under 20 Championships, starting to challenge Chinwe Okoro and Chioma Onyekwere for the number one position in Nigeria. At the Under 20 African Championships (held in Abidjan), she recorded a personal best of 50.04 m (164 ft 2 in), which beat her previous highest score by over five metres. She then set a new personal best of 50.07 m (164 ft 3 1/4 in) at the qualifying trials for the 2019 All Africa Games, later coming fifth at the games with a throw of 49.85 m (163 ft 6 1/2 in). She also won the 2019 National Championships.

She competed for Central Arizona College, where she won consecutive NJCAA Division I Outdoor discus titles in 2021 and 2022.
