= Tsiyon Abebe =

Ethiopian middle- and long-distance runner (born 2006)

Personal information
- Full name: Tsiyon Temesgen Abebe; Tsion Abebe
- Nationality: Ethiopia
- Born: 17 August 2006 (19 years, 350 days old)

Sport
- Sport: Athletics
- Events: 3000 metres 5000 metres

Achievements and titles
- National finals: 2022 Ethiopian U20s; • 3000m, 1st (gold)
- Personal bests: 3000m: 8:44.82 (2022); 5000m: 15:07.45 (2023)
Medal record
Women's athletics
Representing Ethiopia
World U20 Championships
Silver medal – second place	2022 Cali	3000 m
- Updated on 1 January 2024

Tsiyon Temesgen Abebe (born 17 August 2006), also spelled Tsion Abebe, is an Ethiopian middle- and long-distance runner. She was the silver medalist in the 3000 m at the 2022 World Athletics U20 Championships.

== Biography ==
On 10 March 2022, Abebe won the Ethiopian U20 Championships in the 3000 m. Her time of 9:09.5 was both a U20 and U18 world lead. In August 2022, Abebe competed in the 3000 m at the World U20 Championships. Ethiopia entered three runners – Abebe, Medina Eisa, and Bertukan Welde – but as only two were permitted to compete, Eisa did not start the race and Abebe and Welde ran in her place.

In the race, Kenya's Betty Chelangat battled with Abebe for most of the race and only took the lead in the final stages, winning in a time of 9:01 with Abebe taking the silver medal. Abebe, just 15 years old at the time, was four years younger than most of her competitors at the U20 championships. Abebe said after the race,

This is the first time I've gotten to represent my country. Of course, I wanted to get gold, which didn't work out, but I am incredibly happy.

In October 2022, Abebe ran at the World Athletics Cross Country Tour Gold event in Bydgoszcz. After covering the opening 2 km in 7:12, she stayed with the lead pack as it decreased from 10 runners to five to three – Lucy Mawia, Abebe, and Maureen Cherotich. Abebe finished second overall behind Mawia.

== Statistics ==
=== Personal bests ===
Event	Mark	Place	Competition	Venue	Date	Ref
3000 metres	8:44.82	6th	Rabat Diamond League	Rabat, Morocco	5 June 2022	
5000 metres	15:07.45	12th	Stockholm Diamond League	Stockholm, Sweden	2 July 2023	
