= 2022 World Athletics U20 Championships – Women's 3000 metres =

Women's 3000 metres at the 2022 World Athletics U20 Championships
- Venue: Estadio Olímpico Pascual Guerrero
- Dates: 1 August
- Competitors: 15 from 10 nations
- Winning time: 9:01.03

Medalists
gold medal	Betty Chelangat	Kenya
silver medal	Tsiyon Abebe	Ethiopia
bronze medal	Nancy Cherop	Kenya

The women's 3000 metres at the 2022 World Athletics U20 Championships was held at the Estadio Olímpico Pascual Guerrero on 1 August 2022.

Originally, 17 athletes from 11 countries entered to the competition, however, 15 of them competed. Nicola Hogg, from Australia, did not participate while the third runner entered by Ethiopia, Medina Eisa, was unable to compete (only two athletes per member nation can compete in each event).

== Records ==
U20 standing records prior to the 2022 World Athletics U20 Championships were as follows:

Record	Athlete & Nationality	Mark	Location	Date
World U20 Record	Zola Pieterse (GBR)	8:28.83	Rome, Italy	7 September 1985
Championship Record	Beyenu Degefa (ETH)	8:41.76	Bydgoszcz, Poland	20 July 2016
World U20 Leading	Medina Eisa (ETH)	8:41.42	Rabat, Morocco	5 June 2022

== Results ==
The final race started at 17:00 on 1 August 2022. The results were as follows:

Rank	Name	Nationality	Time	Note
1st place, gold medalist(s)	Betty Chelangat	Kenya	9:01.03	
2nd place, silver medalist(s)	Tsiyon Abebe	Ethiopia	9:03.85	
3rd place, bronze medalist(s)	Nancy Cherop	Kenya	9:05.98	
4	Bertukan Welde	Ethiopia	9:18.20	
5	Ilona Mononen	Finland	9:21.12	
6	Agate Caune	Latvia	9:25.92	
7	Siona Chisholm	Canada	9:29.65	
8	Maria Cassou	Greece	9:35.90	
9	Ina Halle Haugen	Norway	9:40.07	
10	Scarlet Chebet	Uganda	9:47.02	
11	Chloe Thomas	Canada	9:53.88	
12	Heidi Nielson	United States	9:56.35	
13	Sofia Benfares	Germany	10:03.17	
14	Kate Peters	United States	10:05.09	
	Anna Marie Sirevåg	Norway	DNF	
