= Charles Godfred =

Nigerian athlete (born 2004)

Charles Edward Godfred
Personal information
- Nationality: Nigerian
- Born: 17 April 2004 (age 22)

Sport
- Sport: Athletics
- Event: Long jump

Achievements and titles
- Personal best: Long jump 8.16 m (2024)
Medal record
Representing Nigeria
Men's athletics
African U20 Championships
Gold medal – first place	2023 Ndola	Long jump

Charles Edward Godfred (born 17 April 2004) is a Nigerian long jumper. He was African under-20 champion in 2023, and winner of the Nigerian Athletics Championships in 2024 and 2025.

== Biography ==
Godfred won the African U20 Athletics Championships in 2023 in Ndola, Zambia, with a jump of 7.86 metres. That year, he also ran a 100 metres time of 10.96 seconds (+0.2 m/s wind) and finished third in the 100 metres at the 3rd African Golden League meet in Abuja and signed-up to attend the University of Minnesota in the United States.

Competing for the University of Minnesota in 2024, he placed sixth at the 2024 NCAA Division I Outdoor Track and Field Championships in Eugene, Oregon in June, with a jump of 7.90 metres. He was the winner of the Nigerian Olympic Trials in Benin City later in June 2024, making a personal best jump of 8.16 metres, a distance which was the furthest by a Nigerian since Stanley Gbagbeke in 2012, and moved him to seventh on the Nigerian all-time list.

In March 2025, he jumped 7.93 metres to win the men's long jump at the Arizona Spring Break Fiesta. In May, he won the Big Ten Conference in Eugene, Oregon with a jump of 8.05 metres. Godfred finished fourth at the 2025 NCAA Outdoor Championships in June in Eugene, Oregon, the highest finish in the event in the Minnesota Gophers program history.

In 2025, Godfred retained his national title at the Nigerian Athletics Championships in Abeokuta with a jump of 7.95 metres. In September 2025, he competed at the 2025 World Championships in Tokyo, Japan, without advancing to the final.

In May 2026, Godfred won a third consecutive long jump title with a best distance of 7.99m at the Big Ten Championships.
