= Oyeniyi Abejoye =

Nigerian sprinter

Personal information
- Nationality: Nigerian
- Born: 16 January 1994 (age 32) Lagos, Nigeria

Sport
- Sport: Track and field
- Events: 100 metres, 110 metres hurdles

Achievements and titles
- Personal bests: 100 m – 10.61 (2019); 200 m – 21.89 (2017); 110 mH – 13.67 (2019)
Medal record
Men's athletics
Representing Nigeria
African Games
Silver medal – second place	2019 Rabat	110 m hurdles
African Championships
Silver medal – second place	2018 Asaba	110 m hurdles

Oyeniyi Abejoye (born 16 January 1994) is a Nigerian track and field athlete who specialises in the 110 metres hurdles and also competes as a sprinter. He competed at the 2018 Commonwealth Games in the 110 metres hurdles. At the 2019 African Games, he competed in the 110 metres hurdles, winning a silver medal. He was a member of the Nigerian 4 × 100 m relay team that won a silver medal in the 2019 African Games.

He won the 110-meters hurdles silver medal at the 2018 African Athletics Championships in Asaba.
