= 2022 Meeting International Mohammed VI d'Athlétisme de Rabat =

- Dates: 5 June 2022
- Host city: Rabat, Morocco
- Venue: Prince Moulay Abdellah Stadium
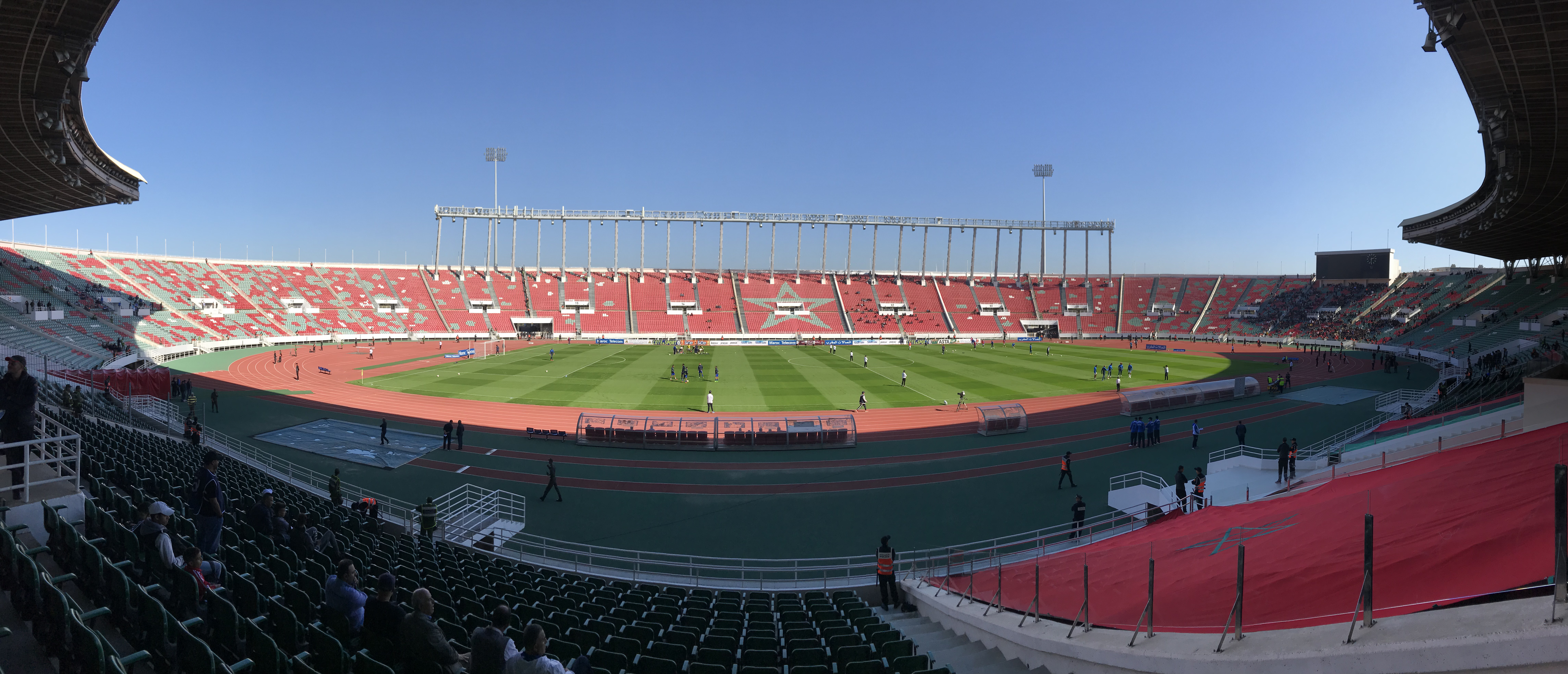
- Level: 2022 Diamond League

The 2022 Meeting International Mohammed VI d'Athlétisme de Rabat was the 13th edition of the annual outdoor track and field meeting in Rabat, Morocco. Held on 5 June at the Prince Moulay Abdellah Stadium, it was the fourth leg of the 2022 Diamond League – the highest level international track and field circuit.

The meeting was highlighted by national favorite Soufiane El Bakkali winning the 3000 metres steeplechase over Lamecha Girma in a world-leading 7:58.28, marking the first time two athletes ran under 8 minutes in the same race since 2012. The biggest cause for concern was 2021 Olympic champion Karsten Warholm pulling up injured, previewing his struggles in 2022 following a year that earned him World Athlete of the Year.

== Results ==
Athletes competing in the Diamond League disciplines earned extra compensation and points which went towards qualifying for the Diamond League finals in Zürich. First place earned 8 points, with each step down in place earning one less point than the previous, until no points are awarded in 9th place or lower.

=== Diamond Discipline ===
Men's 200m (+2.0 m/s)
Place	Athlete	Country	Time	Points
1st place, gold medalist(s)	Kenny Bednarek	United States	20.21	8
2nd place, silver medalist(s)	Luxolo Adams	South Africa	20.35	7
3rd place, bronze medalist(s)	Fausto Desalu	Italy	20.54	6
4	Yancarlos Martínez	Dominican Republic	20.69	5
5	Jerome Blake	Canada	20.74	4
6	Isaac Makwala	Botswana	20.87	3
7	William Reais	Switzerland	21.38	2
8	Mehdi Takordmioui	Morocco	21.57	1

Men's 800m
Place	Athlete	Country	Time	Points
1st place, gold medalist(s)	Emmanuel Wanyonyi	Kenya	1:45.47	8
2nd place, silver medalist(s)	Gabriel Tual	France	1:45.71	7
3rd place, bronze medalist(s)	Collins Kipruto	Kenya	1:46.29	6
4	Amel Tuka	Bosnia and Herzegovina	1:46.53	5
5	Abdelati El Guesse	Morocco	1:46.79	4
6	Mostafa Smaili	Morocco	1:46.86	3
7	Emmanuel Korir	Kenya	1:46.93	2
8	Michael Saruni	Kenya	1:47.60	1
9	Ferguson Rotich	Kenya	1:47.72	
10	Mariano García	Spain	1:48.48	
	Patryk Sieradzki	Poland	DNF	
	Nijel Amos	Botswana	DQ	

Men's 1500m
Place	Athlete	Country	Time	Points
1st place, gold medalist(s)	Jake Wightman	Great Britain	3:32.62	8
2nd place, silver medalist(s)	Jake Heyward	Great Britain	3:33.54	7
3rd place, bronze medalist(s)	Abdelatif Sadiki	Morocco	3:33.93	6
4	Charles Grethen	Luxembourg	3:34.33	5
5	Ismael Debjani	Belgium	3:34.39	4
6	Samuel Abate	Ethiopia	3:34.80	3
7	Mohamed Katir	Spain	3:34.95	2
8	Hicham Ouladha	Morocco	3:35.48	1
9	Elhassane Moujahid	Morocco	3:35.97	
10	Baptiste Mischler	France	3:36.11	
11	William Paulson	Canada	3:38.23	
12	Jimmy Gressier	France	3:39.47	
13	Hafid Rizqy	Morocco	3:40.15	
14	Moa Abounnachat Bollerød	Norway	3:41.16	
15	Azeddine Habz	France	3:41.22	
	Alberto Guerrero	Spain	DNF	

Men's 400mH
Place	Athlete	Country	Time	Points
1st place, gold medalist(s)	Khallifah Rosser	United States	48.25	8
2nd place, silver medalist(s)	Rasmus Mägi	Estonia	48.73	7
3rd place, bronze medalist(s)	Wilfried Happio	France	49.27	6
4	Yasmani Copello	Turkey	49.29	5
5	Jaheel Hyde	Jamaica	49.35	4
6	Ludvy Vaillant	France	49.74	3
7	Saad Hinti	Morocco	52.98	2
	Karsten Warholm	Norway	DNF	

Men's 3000mSC
Place	Athlete	Country	Time	Points
1st place, gold medalist(s)	Soufiane El Bakkali	Morocco	7:58.28	8
2nd place, silver medalist(s)	Lamecha Girma	Ethiopia	7:59.24	7
3rd place, bronze medalist(s)	Hailemariyam Amare	Ethiopia	8:06.29	6
4	Conseslus Kipruto	Kenya	8:12.47	5
5	Avinash Sable	India	8:12.48	4
6	Hillary Bor	United States	8:13.12	3
7	Mehdi Belhadj	France	8:16.35	2
8	Benjamin Kigen	Kenya	8:17.32	1
9	Abraham Kibiwot	Kenya	8:18.78	
10	Salaheddine Ben Yazide	Morocco	8:19.63	
11	Mohamed Tindouft	Morocco	8:27.52	
	Wilberforce Chemiat Kones	Kenya	DNF	
	Abderrafia Bouassel	Morocco	DNF	

Men's Long Jump
Place	Athlete	Country	Mark	Points
1st place, gold medalist(s)	Miltiadis Tentoglou	Greece	8.27 m (+1.4 m/s)	8
2nd place, silver medalist(s)	Simon Ehammer	Switzerland	8.13 m (−0.9 m/s)	7
3rd place, bronze medalist(s)	Maykel Massó	Cuba	8.08 m (+0.6 m/s)	6
4	Thobias Montler	Sweden	8.04 m (−0.5 m/s)	5
5	Emiliano Lasa	Uruguay	7.89 m (+2.8 m/s)	4
6	Ruswahl Samaai	South Africa	7.73 m (+1.4 m/s)	3
7	JuVaughn Harrison	United States	7.64 m (−0.4 m/s)	2
8	Yasin Hajjaji	Morocco	7.38 m (−0.4 m/s)	1
Best wind-legal performances
—	Emiliano Lasa	Uruguay	7.81 m (−0.1 m/s)	

Men's Discus Throw
Place	Athlete	Country	Mark	Points
1st place, gold medalist(s)	Kristjan Čeh	Slovenia	69.68 m	8
2nd place, silver medalist(s)	Daniel Ståhl	Sweden	67.16 m	7
3rd place, bronze medalist(s)	Matthew Denny	Australia	67.07 m	6
4	Andrius Gudžius	Lithuania	66.53 m	5
5	Lukas Weißhaidinger	Austria	65.64 m	4
6	Sam Mattis	United States	64.17 m	3
7	Lawrence Okoye	Great Britain	63.42 m	2
8	Alex Rose	Samoa	63.25 m	1
9	Simon Pettersson	Sweden	62.34 m	
10	Fedrick Dacres	Jamaica	61.34 m	

Women's 100m (+0.3 m/s)
Place	Athlete	Country	Time	Points
1st place, gold medalist(s)	Elaine Thompson-Herah	Jamaica	10.83	8
2nd place, silver medalist(s)	Marie-Josée Ta Lou	Ivory Coast	11.04	7
3rd place, bronze medalist(s)	Natasha Morrison	Jamaica	11.22	6
4	Lorène Bazolo	Portugal	11.42	5
5	Ajla Del Ponte	Switzerland	11.42	4
6	Hajar Eddou	Morocco	11.84	3
	Anthonique Strachan	Bahamas	DNF	

Women's 400m
Place	Athlete	Country	Time	Points
1st place, gold medalist(s)	Marileidy Paulino	Dominican Republic	50.10	8
2nd place, silver medalist(s)	Sada Williams	Barbados	50.74	7
3rd place, bronze medalist(s)	Stephenie Ann McPherson	Jamaica	51.37	6
4	Sophie Becker	Ireland	51.84	5
5	Lada Vondrová	Czech Republic	52.07	4
6	Cátia Azevedo	Portugal	52.23	3
7	Phil Healy	Ireland	52.28	2
8	Camille Laus	Belgium	52.77	1

Women's 1500m
Place	Athlete	Country	Time	Points
1st place, gold medalist(s)	Hirut Meshesha	Ethiopia	3:57.30	8
2nd place, silver medalist(s)	Freweyni Hailu	Ethiopia	3:58.18	7
3rd place, bronze medalist(s)	Axumawit Embaye	Ethiopia	3:58.80	6
4	Georgia Griffith	Australia	4:00.16	5
5	Claudia Bobocea	Romania	4:02.07	4
6	Habitam Alemu	Ethiopia	4:02.50	3
7	Winnie Nanyondo	Uganda	4:02.74	2
8	Edinah Jebitok	Kenya	4:02.96	1
9	Linden Hall	Australia	4:03.29	
10	Melissa Courtney-Bryant	Great Britain	4:04.40	
11	Aurore Fleury	France	4:04.78	
12	Elise Vanderelst	Belgium	4:05.16	
13	Kristiina Mäki	Czech Republic	4:05.30	
14	Tigist Ketema	Ethiopia	4:07.01	
15	Lore Hoffmann	Switzerland	4:07.09	
	Ellie Sanford	Australia	DNF	
	Meryeme Azrour	Morocco	DNF	
	Ksanet Alem	Ethiopia	DNF	

Women's 3000m
Place	Athlete	Country	Time	Points
1st place, gold medalist(s)	Mercy Cherono	Kenya	8:40.29	8
2nd place, silver medalist(s)	Amy-Eloise Markovc	Great Britain	8:40.32	7
3rd place, bronze medalist(s)	Medina Eisa	Ethiopia	8:41.42	6
4	Gloria Kite	Kenya	8:41.81	5
5	Maureen Koster	Netherlands	8:42.28	4
6	Tsiyon Abebe	Ethiopia	8:44.82	3
7	Rose Davies	Australia	8:49.86	2
8	Marta García	Spain	8:51.04	1
9	Ikram Ouaaziz	Morocco	9:04.32	
	Sarah Billings	Australia	DNF	
	Solange Pereira	Spain	DNF	

Women's High Jump
Place	Athlete	Country	Mark	Points
1st place, gold medalist(s)	Yaroslava Mahuchikh	Ukraine	1.96 m	8
2nd place, silver medalist(s)	Iryna Herashchenko	Ukraine	1.93 m	7
3rd place, bronze medalist(s)	Nicola Olyslagers	Australia	1.93 m	6
4	Nadezhda Dubovitskaya	Kazakhstan	1.93 m	5
5	Morgan Lake	Great Britain	1.90 m	4
6	Elena Vallortigara	Italy	1.90 m	3
7	Maja Nilsson	Sweden	1.85 m	2
8	Yuliya Levchenko	Ukraine	1.85 m	1
9	Marija Vuković	Montenegro	1.80 m	

Women's Pole Vault
Place	Athlete	Country	Mark	Points
1st place, gold medalist(s)	Sandi Morris	United States	4.65 m	8
2nd place, silver medalist(s)	Nina Kennedy	Australia	4.65 m	7
3rd place, bronze medalist(s)	Katerina Stefanidi	Greece	4.55 m	6
4	Holly Bradshaw	Great Britain	4.55 m	5
5	Maryna Kylypko	Ukraine	4.45 m	4
6	Tina Šutej	Slovenia	4.45 m	3
7	Nikoleta Kyriakopoulou	Greece	4.30 m	2
—	Katie Moon	United States	NM	
—	Xu Huiqin	China	NM	

Women's Triple Jump
Place	Athlete	Country	Mark	Points
1st place, gold medalist(s)	Thea LaFond	Dominica	14.46 m (+0.3 m/s)	8
2nd place, silver medalist(s)	Shanieka Ricketts	Jamaica	14.43 m (−0.3 m/s)	7
3rd place, bronze medalist(s)	Neja Filipič	Slovenia	14.42 m (−0.4 m/s)	6
4	Patrícia Mamona	Portugal	14.35 m (+0.6 m/s)	5
5	Liadagmis Povea	Cuba	14.27 m (−0.9 m/s)	4
6	Leyanis Pérez	Cuba	14.20 m (+0.7 m/s)	3
7	Hanna Knyazyeva-Minenko	Israel	13.81 m (−1.2 m/s)	2
—	Ana José Tima	Dominican Republic	DQ	

=== Promotional Events ===
Women's 800m
Place	Athlete	Country	Time
1st place, gold medalist(s)	Mary Moraa	Kenya	1:58.93
2nd place, silver medalist(s)	Prudence Sekgodiso	South Africa	1:59.23
3rd place, bronze medalist(s)	Rénelle Lamote	France	1:59.83
4	Elena Bellò	Italy	2:00.76
5	Noélie Yarigo	Benin	2:01.01
6	Alexandra Bell	Great Britain	2:01.50
7	Soukaina Hajji	Morocco	2:01.59
8	Majtie Kolberg	Germany	2:01.63
9	Naomi Korir	Kenya	2:02.14
10	Assia Raziki	Morocco	2:03.16
11	Tigist Girma	Ethiopia	2:03.42
12	Jarinter Mwasya	Kenya	2:10.27
	Naima Ait Alibou	Spain	DNF

=== National Events ===
Men's 200m (−0.6 m/s)
Place	Athlete	Country	Time
1st place, gold medalist(s)	Chakir Machmour	Morocco	21.18
2nd place, silver medalist(s)	Amine Ait Elhadj	Morocco	21.87
3rd place, bronze medalist(s)	Abdellah Hzoum	Morocco	22.02
4	Yassine Hssine	Morocco	22.34
5	Zakaria Souggat	Morocco	22.47
6	Anouar Elaoufi	Morocco	22.74
7	Yassine Azib	Morocco	22.76

Men's 400m
Place	Athlete	Country	Time
1st place, gold medalist(s)	Hamza Dair	Morocco	46.38
2nd place, silver medalist(s)	Aymane El Haddaoui	Morocco	47.02
3rd place, bronze medalist(s)	Rachid Mhamdi	Morocco	47.23
4	Oussama Hammi	Morocco	48.22
5	Yahya Nazih	Morocco	48.89
6	Abdelali Ouyamna	Morocco	49.29
7	Farid Hasnaoui	Morocco	50.59
	El Mehdi Dimokrati	Morocco	DQ

Women's 200m (+1.1 m/s)
Place	Athlete	Country	Time
1st place, gold medalist(s)	Salma Lehlali	Morocco	24.47
2nd place, silver medalist(s)	Saida Ramak	Morocco	26.14

== See also ==
- 2022 Diamond League
- 2022 Weltklasse Zürich (Diamond League final)
