= 3x3 basketball at the 2019 African Games =

- Venue: Ibn Sina Park – Hilton
- Location: Rabat, Morocco
- Dates: 21–25 August

3x3 basketball at the 2019 African Games was held from 21 to 25 August 2019 in Rabat, Morocco.

== Schedule ==
P	Preliminary round	¼	Quarter-finals	½	Semi-finals	B	Bronze medal match	F	Gold medal match

Date Event	Wed 21	Thu 22	Fri 23	Sat 24	Sun 25		
Men 3x3	P	P	¼		½	B	F
Women 3x3	P	P		¼	½	B	F

== Participating nations ==
- Angola
- Democratic Republic of the Congo
- Ivory Coast
- Egypt
- Ethiopia
- Equatorial Guinea
- The Gambia
- Kenya
- Madagascar
- Mali
- Morocco
- Niger
- Nigeria
- Somalia
- Togo
- Tunisia
- Uganda

== Medalists ==
Event	Gold	Silver	Bronze
Men	Madagascar; Solondrainy Alpha Jean Arnol; Elly Randriamampionona; Rakotonirina Fiary Jonhson; Ratianarivo Livio Rocheteau	Egypt; Basem Alian; Serageldin Elsayed; Mohamed Mohamed; Kareem Moussa	Nigeria; Peace Godwin; Kanyinsola Odufuwa; Mustapha Oyebanji; Chukwunonso Udemezue
Women	Nigeria; Fummanya Ijeh; Abel Marvellous; Murjanatu Musa; Ifunanya Okoro	Mali; Gnere Dembele; Assetou Diakite; Aissata Maiga; Djeneba N'Diaye	Democratic Republic of the Congo; Sungulia Alliance; Sephora Kayolo Mangenza; Luzenga Louange; Bula Mariana

== Medal table ==
Rank	Nation	Gold	Silver	Bronze	Total
1	Nigeria (NGR)	1	0	1	2
2	Madagascar (MAD)	1	0	0	1
3	Egypt (EGY)	0	1	0	1
3	Mali (MLI)	0	1	0	1
5	Democratic Republic of the Congo (COD)	0	0	1	1
Totals (5 entries)		2	2	2	6
