= 2015 African Youth Athletics Championships =

2nd African Youth Athletics Championships
- Dates: 23–26 April
- Host city: Reduit, Mauritius
- Venue: Maryse Justin Stadium
- Level: Youth
- Events: 38
- Participation: 27 nations

The 2015 African Youth Athletics Championships was the second edition of the biennial athletics competition for African athletes aged fifteen to seventeen, It was held in Reduit, Mauritius from 23–26 April. Mauritius had hosted the 2013 African Junior Athletics Championships two years earlier. A total of 38 events, 18 by boys and 20 by girls, were contested at the competition.

South Africa topped the medals table with seventeen gold medals and 29 medals overall. This marked a great improvement from the inaugural edition in 2013, having missed that event due to a lack of funding. Nigeria who were the previous host only managed to confirm participation due to a late intervention by an anonymous sponsor. The next most successful countries were Kenya (eight golds and 19 in total) and Nigeria (six medals, two of them gold). South Africa won all but one of the gold medals in the throws. Kenya won all the long-distance events at the championships. Eighteen of the twenty-seven participating nations reached the medal table. The host nation Mauritius took one gold medal, through octathlete Bryan Tonta, and ended with a total of seven medals.

As had happened at the 2013 edition, doubles were achieved in both 100 metres and 200 metres sprints: Gift Leotlela of South Africa topped the boys' rankings and his teammate Nicola de Bruyn took the girls' titles. A third athlete managed a double in the rest of the competition – Taylon Bieldt, also of South Africa, won both the girls' hurdling events.

== Medal summary ==
=== Boys ===
Event	Gold		Silver		Bronze	
100 metres (wind: +2.2 m/s)	Tlotliso Leotlela (RSA)	10.38	Kyle Appel (RSA)	10.49	Shingirai Hlanguyo (ZIM)	10.52
200 metres	Tlotliso Leotlela (RSA)	20.84	Thabiso Sekgopi (BOT)	21.43	Sengan Jobe (GAM)	21.68
400 metres	Karabo Sibanda (BOT)	47.40	Josphat Ngeno (KEN)	48.18	Nikolas Marich (RSA)	48.41
800 metres	Kipyegon Bett (KEN)	1:51.67	Sila Kimeli (KEN)	1:52.14	Edrissa Marong (GAM)	1:52.88
1500 metres	Taki Kumaru (KEN)	3:44.35	Brimin Kiprono (KEN)	3:46.22	Daniel Weldetnsae (ERI)	3:48.49
3000 metres	Davies Kiplangat (KEN)	7:56.29	Richard Yator (KEN)	7:56.33	Mehari Tsegai (ERI)	8:18.75
110 metres hurdles (wind: +2.4 m/s)	Mpho Tladi (RSA)	13.38 w	Levert Pieterse (RSA)	13.62 w	Steven Untah (MRI)	14.65 w
400 metres hurdles	Geoffrey Kipngetich (KEN)	52.28	Morne van As (RSA)	52.43	Emmanuel Kipyegon (KEN)	53.45
2000 metres steeplechase	Vincent Kipyegon (KEN)	5:37.05	Nickson Kiplangat (KEN)	5:41.28	Mohamed Miftahou (COM)	6:13.77
Medley relay	South Africa (RSA); Tlotliso Leotlela; Kyle Appel; Mphu Tladi; Morne van As	1:53.60	Botswana (BOT); Aobakwe Malau; Thabeso Sekgopi; Kageso Moyuthu; Karabo Sibanda	1:54.10	Gambia (GAM); Momadou Sey; Sulayman Mannah; Sengan Jobe; Edrissa Marong	1:55.17
10,000 metres walk	Pierre Vermaak (RSA)	46:09.53	Abdelrahman Mahmoud (EGY)	48:23.65	Said Touche (ALG)	51:58.55
High jump	Aobakwe Nkobela (BOT)	2.04 m	Norris Brioche (SEY)	2.01 m	Visamuje Ujaha (NAM)	1.98 m
Long jump	Muchine Khoua (MAR)	7.41 m	Emmanuel Tobechukwu (NGR)	7.38 m	Abdelouahed Bouhila (MAR)	7.31 m
Triple jump	Vincent Kilel (KEN)	15.04 m	Emmanuel Tobechukwu (NGR)	14.89 m	Muchine Khoua (MAR)	14.66 m
Shot put	Burger Lambrecht (RSA)	20.89 m	Shehab Mohamed (EGY)	19.87 m	Patrick Duvenhage (RSA)	19.80 m
Discus throw	Werner Visser (RSA)	64.88 m CR	Patrick Duvenhage (RSA)	60.61 m	Shehab Abdelaziz Chachi (EGY)	58.31 m
Javelin throw	Henru van Vuuren (RSA)	72.68 m	Paul Botha (RSA)	71.48 m	Nico Horn (NAM)	65.08 m
Octathlon	Bryan Tonta (MRI)	5363 pts	Bryan Untah (MRI)	5203 pts	Ammar Ellaboudy (EGY)	4995 pts

=== Girls ===
Event	Gold		Silver		Bronze	
100 metres	Nicola de Bruyn (RSA)	11.87	Damarais Akoth (KEN)	12.53	Severine Moutia (MRI)	12.80
200 metres	Nicola de Bruyn (RSA)	23.59	Praise Idamadudu (NGR)	23.79	Madia Ehlers (RSA)	24.01
400 metres	Abigail Chongo (ZAM)	58.08	Nomatter Kapfudzaruwa (ZIM)	59.03	Henryke Garbers (NAM)	59.07
800 metres	Liza Kellerman (RSA)	2:10.79	Betty Chepkemoi (KEN)	2:10.94	Honorine Iribagiza (RWA)	2:13.26
1500 metres	Beatha Nishimwe (RWA)	4:17.37	Janet Chemusto (UGA)	4:17.61	Janeth Chepngetich (KEN)	4:21.87
3000 metres	Emily Chebet (KEN)	9:10.57 CR	Sheila Chelangat (KEN)	9:11.38	Janet Chemusto (UGA)	9:15.38
100 metres hurdles	Taylon Bieldt (RSA)	13.30	Bouchra Namri (MAR)	14.47	Ramatoulaye Cisse (SEN)	15.23
400 metres hurdles	Taylon Bieldt (RSA)	59.22	Bouchra Namri (MAR)	61.23	Amore le Roux (RSA)	61.40
2000 metres steeplechase	Sandra Chebet (KEN)	6:20.47	Fatima Ghizlane (MAR)	7:06.59	Ann Gathoni (KEN)	7:29.09
Medley relay	Nigeria (NGR); Omotayo Abolaji; Blessing Adiakerenwa; Aniekeme Alphonsus; Praise Idamadudu	2:08.71	South Africa (RSA); Nicola de Bruyn; Amoure Leroux; Madia Ehlers; Taylon Bieldt	2:11.21	Zimbabwe (ZIM); Kiana Page Lees; Nomatter Kapfud; Nathalie Charidza; Zaruwa Enlitha	2:20.17
5000 metres walk	Fadakemi Olude (NGR)	25:20.28	Nourhan Saber (EGY)	30:55.11	Nathalia Saminadas (MRI)	36:53.44
High jump	Wiaam Chibani (ALG)	1.69 m	Siranda Horn (NAM)	1.63 m	Fatima Zahra el Alaoui (MAR)	1.60 m
Pole vault	May Meziod (ALG)	3.20 m	Marina Rizk (EGY)	3.15 m	Farah Benhadid (ALG)	2.80 m
Long jump	Renate van Tonder (RSA)	5.92 m	Aniekeme Alphonsus (NGR)	5.50 m	Fatou Badji (SEN)	5.40 m
Triple jump	Fatou Badji (SEN)	12.06 m	Liliane Potiron (MRI)	11.64 m	Honorine Iribagiza (RWA)	9.37 m
Shot put	Yolandi Stander (RSA)	14.95 m	Nourhan El Dakak (EGY)	14.12 m	Nahid Klilou (MAR)	13.26 m
Discus throw	Chene Coetzee (RSA)	42.95 m	Rima Nasr (MAR)	41.20 m	Yolandi Stander (RSA)	40.94 m
Hammer throw	Fatma Mahmoud (EGY)	55.25 m	Marim Nasr (EGY)	54.46 m	Samira Addi (MAR)	50.40 m
Javelin throw	Anneke Germishuis (RSA)	49.72 m	Salma Taha (EGY)	48.94 m	Maggie le Roux (RSA)	46.89 m
Heptathlon	Sylvia Schulz (NAM)	4733 pts	Nahid Klilou (MAR)	3983 pts	Claudia Bernard (MRI)	3603 pts

== Medal table ==
Host nation

Rank	Nation	Gold	Silver	Bronze	Total
1	South Africa (RSA)	17	6	6	29
2	Kenya (KEN)	8	9	2	19
3	Nigeria (NGR)	2	4	0	6
4	Botswana (BOT)	2	2	0	4
5	Algeria (ALG)	2	0	2	4
6	Egypt (EGY)	1	8	2	11
7	Morocco (MAR)	1	3	6	10
8	Mauritius (MRI)*	1	2	4	7
9	Namibia (NAM)	1	1	3	5
10	Rwanda (RWA)	1	0	2	3
10	Senegal (SEN)	1	0	2	3
12	Zambia (ZAM)	1	0	0	1
13	Zimbabwe (ZIM)	0	1	2	3
14	Uganda (UGA)	0	1	1	2
15	Seychelles (SEY)	0	1	0	1
16	Gambia (GAM)	0	0	3	3
17	Eritrea (ERI)	0	0	2	2
18	Comoros (COM)	0	0	1	1
Totals (18 entries)		38	38	38	114
