= 2023 African U18 and U20 Championships in Athletics =

African U18 and U20 Championships
- Dates: 29 April – 3 May
- Host city: Ndola, Zambia
- Venue: Levy Mwanawasa Stadium
- Level: U20 and U18
- Events: 45 U20 & 40 U18

The 2023 African U20 Championships in Athletics was the fifteenth edition of the biennial, continental athletics tournament for African athletes aged 19 years or younger, for the second time held jointly with the African U18 Championships in Athletics. It was held at the Levy Mwanawasa Stadium in Ndola, Zambia, between 29 April and 3 May.

== Medal summary ==
=== Men (U20) ===
Event	Gold		Silver		Bronze	
100 metres (Wind: -1.4 m/s)	Kayinsola Ajayi (NGR)	10.51	Malambo Chongo (ZAM)	10.54	Matthew van Rooyen (RSA)	10.55
200 metres (Wind: -3.4 m/s)	Armand van der Walt (RSA)	20.82	Musbau Adebisi (NGR)	20.97	Luqmaan Gabier (RSA)	21.34
400 metres	Busang Kebinatshipi (BOT)	44.91 CR	Thomson Mbewe (ZAM)	46.08	Kago Seshoka (BOT)	46.23
800 metres	Brian Kiptum Kweyei (KEN)	1:48.31	Fithawi Garza (ERI)	1:48.74	Ashenafi Gadisa (ETH)	1:48.87
1500 metres	Reynold Kipkorir Cheruiyot (KEN)	3:33.65	Ashenafi Gadisa (ETH)	3:36.98	Gilbert Kipngetich Rono (KEN)	3:37.40
5000 metres	Dan Kibet (UGA)	13:45.57	Ayele Tadesse (ETH)	13:45.93	Vincent Kimaiyo (KEN)	13:46.69
10,000 metres	Dennis Mutuku (KEN)	30:00.10	Amos Kipkurui Langat (KEN)	30:01.20	Samuel Kibathi Wanjiru (KEN)	30:01.50
110 metres hurdles (99 cm) (Wind: -1.6 m/s)	Moncif Kherrafi (ALG)	13.81	Vihan Kemp (RSA)	13.95	Joel Iheakolam (NGR)	14.34
400 metres hurdles	Wernich van Rensburg (RSA)					
3000 metres steeplechase	Emmanuel Wafula (KEN)	8:56.91	Yayeh Amsalu (ETH)	9:00.24	Giedoeon Rotich (UGA)	9:01.21
4×100 metres relay	Nigeria (NGR); Kingsley Emeka Unorji; Kayinsola Ajayi; Musibau Adebisi; Nurain Kola Musa	39.73	South Africa (RSA); Wihan Kemp; Luqmaan Gabier; Matthew van Rooijen; Armand van der Walt	40.16	Zambia (ZAM); Joseph Daka; Malambo Chongo; Lukundo Kapambalala; Chiluba Julio Kapilikisha	40.91
4×400 metres relay	Botswana (BOT); Enerst Kumevu; Busang Collen Kebinatshipi; Keorapetse Oreokame; Kago Seshoka	3:08.14	Zambia (ZAM); Adonai Mukuka Bwalya; Thomson Mbewe; Henry Fulumaka; Martin Mauluka	3:10.71	South Africa (RSA); Wiaan Martin; Wernich van Rensburg; Matthew Burnett; Rorisang Rammupudu	3:10.83
10,000 m walk	Misgana Wakuma (ETH)	41:36.64	Oussama Farhat (TUN)	41:46.79	Stephen Ndangiri Kihu (KEN)	42:01.45
High jump	Brian Raats (RSA)	2.15 m	Zyad Amr Sayed Ahmed (EGY)	2.09 m	Taolo Lesole (BOT)	2.01 m
Pole vault	Tamer Ashraf Mohammed (EGY)	5.00 m	Kareem Mohamed Mahmoud (EGY)	4.80 m	Tyler Manthe (RSA)	4.60 m
Long jump	Charles Edward Godfred (NGR)	7.86 m	Asande Mthembu (RSA)	7.78 m	Zaïd Latif (MAR)	7.77 m
Triple jump	Soumaila Sabo (BUR)	15.74 m	Joel Iheakolam (NGR)	15.72 m	Takunda Mhete (ZIM)	15.20 m
Shot put (6 kg)	JL van Rensburg (RSA)	17.76 m	Rodney Ngezimani (ZIM)	16.50 m	Danie Strooh (RSA)	14.32 m
Discus throw (1.75 kg)	Danie Strooh (RSA)	58.62 m	JL van Rensburg (RSA)	47.22 m	Takunda Billiage Mubariki (ZIM)	46.02 m
Hammer throw (6 kg)	Charl Greyling (RSA)	66.45 m	Younes Khatal (ALG)	63.46 m	Adham Mohamed Ibrahim Mohamed Saleh (EGY)	63.35 m
Javelin throw	Johandre Pienaar (RSA)	66.12 m	Boris Amakai (CMR)	64.44 m	Andrew Shabiyemba (ZAM)	59.94 m
Decathlon (U20)	Nour Hossam Mohamed Tharwat Abdelaal Sakr (EGY)	6600 pts	Youssef Hassan Khalaf Abu Al-Layl (EGY)	6169 pts	Benhellal Benhellal (ALG)	5688 pts

=== Women (U20) ===
Event	Gold		Silver		Bronze	
100 metres (Wind: -0.4 m/s)	Tima Godbless (NGR)	11.45	Kayla Murray (RSA)	11.70	Adijatu Rejoice Sule (NGR)	11.77
200 metres (Wind: -2.4 m/s)	Tima Godbless (NGR)	23.35	Georgiana Sesay (SLE)	24.30	Adetutu Funmilayo Aladeloye (NGR)	24.33
400 metres	Opeyemi Deborah Oke (NGR)	52.67	Precious Molepo (RSA)	53.14	Ada Princess Bright (NGR)	54.05
800 metres	Peninah Muthoni Mutisya (KEN)	2:03.55	Mitn Ewunete (ETH)	2:04.14	Judy Kemunto (KEN)	2:04.55
1500 metres	Wubrist Aschal (ETH)	4:37.78	Samrawit Muluget (ETH)	4:38.63	Mitn Ewunete (ETH)	4:39.10
3000 metres	Asmarech Anley (ETH)	8:56.7	Yenawa Kefale (ETH)	8:57.8	Aynadis Mebrit (ETH)	8:58.4
5000 metres	Wubrist Aschal (ETH)	16:43.37	Aynadis Mebrit (ETH)	16:44.53	Asmarech Anley (ETH)	16:44.55
100 metres hurdles (Wind: -2.2 m/s)	Chane Kok (RSA)	14.29	Natasha Gertenbach (RSA)	14.33	Malak Ayman Rashwan (EGY)	14.67
400 metres hurdles	Anje Nel (RSA)	58.11	Sita Sibiri (BUR)	60.50	Douae Gourinda (MAR)	63.83
3000 metres steeplechase	Pamela Kosgei (KEN)	10:06.47	Phemelo Matshaba (RSA)	13:00.20	Only two starters	
4 × 100 metres relay	South Africa (RSA); Natasha Gertenbach; Kayla La Grange; Kaylee Le Roux; Kayla Murray	45.70	Zambia (ZAM); Blessings Miyambo; Ruth Mutale; Kabinga Mpande; Edna Ngadula	46.04	Ivory Coast (CIV); Munetsi Rujeko; Priviledge Bower; Linnet Zembe; Samukeliso Ndebele	47.13
4 × 400 metres relay	Nigeria (NGR); Ada Princess Bright; Queen Usunobun; Osaretin Joy Usenbor; Opeyemi Deborah Oke	3:38.64	South Africa (RSA); Jessica van Heerden; Anje Nel; Michaela Thomsen; Precious Molepo	3:40.07	Zambia (ZAM); Susan Mwape; Emelda Kapunjila; Ruth Mutale; Cryness Muleya	3:46.60
10,000 m walk	Maysaa Boughdir (TUN)	52:48.64	Ilhem Mansouri (ALG)	54:16.42	Janise Nell (RSA)	58:37.71
High jump	Goitseone Joel (BOT)	1.60 m	Only one finisher			
Pole vault	Shannon Purchase (RSA)	3.40 m	Shahd Mohamed Fouad Mohamed (EGY)	3.25 m	Only two starters	
Long jump	Grace Oshiokpu (NGR)	5.85 m	Wissal Harkas (ALG)	5.70 m	Aya El Aglaoui (MAR)	5.63 m
Triple jump	Grace Oshiokpu (NGR)	13.02 m	Aya El Aglaoui (MAR)	12.57 m	Wissal Harkas (ALG)	12.53 m
Shot put	Ashley Erasmus (RSA)	16.11 m	Tuane Silver (NAM)	14.88 m	Frederick Lemongo Nkoulou (CMR)	14.63 m
Discus throw	Ashley Erasmus (RSA)	50.91 m	Tuane Silver (NAM)	44.23 m	Frederick Lemongo Nkoulou (CMR)	38.77 m
Hammer throw	Nada Soliman Abdelnaby (EGY)	53.96 m	Zmorda Hajji (TUN)	48.12 m	Cilethe Julies (RSA)	47.66 m
Javelin throw	Mwanaamina Mkwayu (TAN)	47.33 m NR	Irene Chepkemboi (KEN)	47.28 m	Merinda Cronje (RSA)	40.10 m
Heptathlon	Malak Ayman Rashwan (EGY)	5049 pts	Roline Louw (RSA)	4570 pts	Only two starters	

=== Mixed (U20) ===
Event	Gold		Silver		Bronze	
4 × 400 metres relay	South Africa (RSA); Wiaan Martin; Jessica van Heerden; Rorisang Rammupudu; Precious Molepo	3:25.42	Nigeria (NGR)	3:25.60	Kenya (KEN)	3:29.38

=== Boys (U18) ===
Event	Gold		Silver		Bronze	
100 metres (Wind: -1.6 m/s)	Werner Bezuidenhout (RSA)	10.47 CR	Steven Sabino (MOZ)	10.48	Bayanda Walaza (RSA)	10.59
200 metres (Wind: -0.4 m/s)	Samuel Uchenna Ogazi (NGR)	20.93	Leendert Koekemoer (RSA)	21.22	Israel Okon Sunday (NGR)	21.36
400 metres	Samuel Uchenna Ogazi (NGR)	46.01 CR	Samuel Toili (KEN)	46.18	Leendert Koekemoer (RSA)	46.31
800 metres	Kelvin Kimutai Koech (KEN)	1:50.18	Samuel Buche (ETH)	1:50.60	Adama Salam (GHA)	1:50.90
1500 metres	Jospat Sang Kipkirui (KEN)	3:40.0	Brian Muange Musau (KEN)	3:50.0	Mouktar Idriss Samrieh (DJI)	3:50.0
3000 metres	Sewmehon Anteneh (ETH)		Andrew Kiptoo (KEN)		Clinton Kimutai (KEN)	
110 metres hurdles (91.4 cm) (Wind: -1.7 m/s)	Naeem Jack (RSA)	13.31 CR	Werner Bezuidenhout (RSA)	13.57	Gasmi Zehr Eddine (ALG)	14.05
400 metres hurdles	Matodzi Ndo (RSA)	51.36 CR	Nicholas Aninze Ifeanyichukwu (NGR)	53.10	Amos Kipkemoi (KEN)	53.53
2000 metres steeplechase	Edmund Serem (KEN)	4:37.78	Evans Kipkosgei Biwott (KEN)	4:38.63	Feyisa Mengistu Obsa (ETH)	4:39.10
Medley relay	Nigeria (NGR)	1:52.82	South Africa (RSA)	1:53.20	Gambia (GAM)	1:53.67
10,000 m walk	Rayyan Cherni (TUN)	50:08.15	Yamkela Shosha (RSA)	50:08.15	Akram Hocine (ALG)	50:47.86
High jump	Luke van der Merwe (RSA)	2.10 m CR	Justin Osigwe Jimoh (NGR)	2.05 m	Fiaku Goodluck Ezechukwuchiri (NGR)	2.00 m
Pole vault	Farid Ahmed Tamer Mohamed (ALG)	4.40 m	Andrew Rothman (RSA)	4.20 m	Mohcene Guerfi (ALG)	4.20 m
Long jump	Temoso Masikane (RSA)	8.06 m AU18R	Louai Lamraoui (ALG)	7.36 m	Godsgift Nwabogwu (NGR)	6.97 m
Triple jump	Precious Ugo Irivi (NGR)	15.70 m CR	Samuel Tadiwanashe Dauti (ZIM)	14.65 m	Yanis Kechar (ALG)	14.64 m
Shot put (5 kg)	Henco Lamberts (RSA)	20.14 m	Ammar Ashraf Ali Nady (EGY)	17.66 m	Samir Sululu (TAN)	16.89 m
Discus throw (1.5 kg)	Zak Naude (RSA)	55.19 m	Ammar Ashraf Ali Nady (EGY)	54.20 m	Henco Lamberts (RSA)	53.41 m
Hammer throw (5 kg)	Adam Tamer Owis (EGY)	66.04 m	Abdalla Mohamed Hussein (EGY)	65.12 m	Roger Vorster (RSA)	64.89 m
Javelin throw (700 g)	Ewald Jansen (RSA)	74.04 m	Mohamed Osama Fathy Hassan (EGY)	69.69 m	Haithem Arafat Ben Aoulai (ALG)	55.55 m
Octathlon	Louai Lamraoui (ALG)	5629 pts	Mohcene Guerfi (ALG)	5047 pts	Adriaano Hartogh (RSA)	4731 pts

=== Girls (U18) ===
Event	Gold		Silver		Bronze	
100 metres (Wind: -1.4 m/s)	Faith Okwose (NGR)	11.53 CR	Justina Tiana Eyakpobeyan (NGR)	11.55	Reabaka Matshitse (RSA)	11.89
200 metres (Wind: -0.2 m/s)	Faith Okwose (NGR)	23.31 CR	Chane Vermeulen (RSA)	23.49	Justina Tiana Eyakpobeyan (NGR)	23.60
400 metres	Colene Scheepers (RSA)	53.78	Favour Onyah Onyinye (NGR)	54.05	Chane Vermeulen (RSA)	54.24
800 metres	Nancy Cherop (KEN)	2:05.88	Daisy Chepngetich (KEN)	2:06.68	Janet Jepkoech Chepkemoi (KEN)	2:08.16
1500 metres	Nancy Cherop (KEN)	4:10.73 CR	Janet Jepkoech Chepkemoi (KEN)	4:13.20	Aselef Amare Kassie (ETH)	4:20.50
3000 metres	Nancy Cherop (KEN)		Joyline Chepkemoi (KEN)			
100 metres hurdles (76.2 cm) (Wind: -1.3 m/s)	Tumi Ramokgopa (RSA)	13.42	Faith Osamuyi Osatohanmwen (NGR)	13.77	Sandri van Rooyen (RSA)	13.84
400 metres hurdles	Tumi Ramokgopa (RSA)	59.41	Gift Ovedje Okeoghene (NGR)	61.18	Odile Kiendrebeogo (BUR)	67.97
2000 metres steeplechase	Alemnat Walle Fenta (ETH)	6:14.29	Frehiwot Gesese Ayana (ETH)	6:18.55	Diana Chepkemoi (KEN)	6:23.70
Medley relay	Nigeria (NGR)	2:09.46	South Africa (RSA)	2:09.95	Kenya (KEN); Jackline Nguyo; Daisy Chepkemoi; Selfa Ajiambo; Sharon Moraa	2:14.52
5000 m walk	Imen Saii (TUN)	24:22.51	Ayalew Sinshaw Abebu (ETH)	24:53.80	Nesrine Cherni (TUN)	25:02.94
High jump	Cindy Strydom (RSA)	1.72 m		m		m
Pole vault	Ansume de Beer (RSA)	3.80 m CR		m		m
Long jump	Timeke-Jade Coetzee (RSA)	6.08 m CR	Prestina Oluchi Ochonogor (NGR)	6.00 m	Awa Zongo (BUR)	5.68 m
Triple jump	Praise Djoma Oghenefejiro (NGR)	12.67 m (w)	Awa Zongo (BUR)	12.53 m	Timeke-Jade Coetzee (RSA)	12.14 m (w)
Shot put (3 kg)	Alicia Khunou (RSA)	15.93 m	Yedidya Bangue Elomboo (CMR)	13.61 m	Ghofrane Lahmaedi (TUN)	13.58 m
Discus throw	Alicia Khunou (RSA)	50.10 m CR	Ghofrane Lahmaedi (TUN)	33.91 m	Gracious Selemani (ZAM)	26.23 m
Hammer throw	Anje Holtzhausen (RSA)	57.17 m	Malak Sayed Mohamed Othman (EGY)	56.23 m	Nahed Amr Saleh Mahmoud El Tablihy (EGY)	53.70 m
Javelin throw	Anli Engelbrecht (RSA)	49.91 m	Manel Kahlouch (ALG)	44.76 m	Carolyne Anyango Odwory (KEN)	42.53 m
Heptathlon	Cara Smith (RSA)	4708 pts	Manel Kahlouch (ALG)	4535 pts	Chaima Aoudia (ALG)	4321 pts

== Medal table (U20) ==
* Host nation (Zambia)

Rank	NOC	Gold	Silver	Bronze	Total
1	South Africa (RSA)	13	10	7	30
2	Nigeria (NGR)	9	2	4	15
3	Kenya (KEN)	6	2	6	14
4	Ethiopia (ETH)	4	7	4	15
5	Egypt (EGY)	4	3	2	9
6	Botswana (BOT)	3	0	2	5
7	Algeria (ALG)	1	3	2	6
8	Tunisia (TUN)	1	2	0	3
9	Burkina Faso (BUR)	1	1	0	2
10	Zimbabwe (ZIM)	1	0	4	5
11	Tanzania (TAN)	1	0	1	2
11	Uganda (UGA)	1	0	1	2
13	Zambia (ZAM)*	0	4	3	7
14	Namibia (NAM)	0	2	0	2
15	Morocco (MAR)	0	1	3	4
16	Cameroon (CMR)	0	1	2	3
17	Eritrea (ERI)	0	1	0	1
17	Sierra Leone (SLE)	0	1	0	1
Totals (18 entries)		45	40	41	126

== Medal table (U18) ==
* Host nation (Zambia)

Rank	NOC	Gold	Silver	Bronze	Total
1	South Africa (RSA)	19	7	9	35
2	Nigeria (NGR)	8	8	3	19
3	Kenya (KEN)	6	7	6	19
4	Egypt (EGY)	2	5	2	9
5	Algeria (ALG)	2	4	5	11
6	Ethiopia (ETH)	2	3	2	7
7	Tunisia (TUN)	2	1	2	5
8	Burkina Faso (BUR)	0	1	2	3
9	Cameroon (CMR)	0	1	0	1
9	Mozambique (MOZ)	0	1	0	1
9	Zimbabwe (ZIM)	0	1	0	1
12	Djibouti (DJI)	0	0	1	1
12	Gambia (GAM)	0	0	1	1
12	Ghana (GHA)	0	0	1	1
12	Tanzania (TAN)	0	0	1	1
12	Zambia (ZAM)*	0	0	1	1
Totals (16 entries)		41	39	36	116
