= Athletics at the 2023 Commonwealth Youth Games =

Athletics at the VII Commonwealth Youth Games
- Dates: 7–10 August
- Host city: Port of Spain
- Venue: Hasely Crawford Stadium
- Level: U18 (Athletics and para-athletics)
- Events: 34

Athletics was one of the 7 sports of the 2023 Commonwealth Youth Games. The events were held at the Hasely Crawford Stadium, Port of Spain, Trinidad, Trinidad and Tobago.

== Athletics ==
=== Boys ===
Event	Gold		Silver		Bronze	
100 metres	Teddy Wilson; England	10.37	Ebuka Nwokeji; England	10.43	Shaquane Gehvon; Jamaica	10.43
200 metres	Samuel Ogazi; Nigeria	21.22	Dean Patterson; Scotland	21.45	Rusciano Thomas-Riley; England	21.59
400 metres	Samuel Ogazi; Nigeria	46.99	Malachi Austin; Guyana	47.97	Alexander Beck; England	48.20
800 metres	Kelvin Koech; Kenya	1:50.14	Miles Waterworth; England	1:52.21	Caleb McLeod; Scotland	1:52.83
1500 metres	Jospat Sang; Kenya	3:37.66	Andrew Alamisi; Kenya	3:38.12	Jacob Sande; Uganda	3:39.69
3000 metres	Jospat Sang; Kenya	8:03.65	Andrew Alamisi; Kenya	8:04.35	Victor Cherotich; Uganda	8:19.31
110 metres hurdles	Shaquane Gordon; Jamaica	13.16	Noah Hanson; England	13.20	Daneil Wright; Jamaica	13.45
400 metres hurdles	Daniel Wright; Jamaica	51.51	Ayomal Kuda Liyanage; Sri Lanka	51.61	Oliver Parker; England	52.36
High jump	Ethan Glyde; England	2.06	Jaidi James; Trinidad and Tobago	2.00	Nilupul Rathnaweera; Sri Lanka	2.00
Long jump	Andrew Stone; Cayman Islands	7.70	Temoso Masiken; South Africa	7.51	Teon Haynes; Barbados	7.32
Discus throw	George Wells; Australia	56.75	Hencu Lamberts; South Africa	53.00	Denzel Phillips; Saint Lucia	47.77
Javelin throw	Willem Jansen; South Africa	79.85	Tom Rutter; England	67.54	Arjun Arjun; India	65.94
Shot put	Hencu Lamberts; South Africa	20.17	Robert Deal III; Bahamas	15.99	Denzel Phillips; Saint Lucia	15.77

=== Girls ===
Event	Gold		Silver		Bronze	
100 metres	Faith Okwose; Nigeria	11.26	Justina Eyakpobeyan; Nigeria	11.29	Saana Fredrick; Trinidad and Tobago	11.48
200 metres	Faith Okwose; Nigeria	23.36	Justina Eyakpobeyan; Nigeria	23.47	La'nika Locker; Antigua and Barbuda	
400 metres	Tianna Springer; Guyana	53.55	Charlotte Henrich; England	53.65	Narissa McPherson; Guyana	54.82
800 metres	Phoebe Gill; England	2:02.30 GR	Asha Kiran Barla; India	2:04.99	Fleur Cooper; Australia	2:05.86
1500 metres	Nancy Cherop; Kenya	4:12.38 GR	Janet Chepkemoi; Kenya	4:14.24	Lyla Belshaw; England	4:16.37
3000 metres	Nancy Cherop; Kenya	9:07.15	Financia Chekwemoi; Uganda	9:25.67	Eliza Nicholson; England	9:26.00
100 metres hurdles	Delta Amidzowski; Australia	13.25	Thea Brown; England	13.53	Tumi Hope; South Africa	13.53
400 metres hurdles	Stephanie Okoro; England	58.19	Mia Walker; England	1:00.52	Tumi Hope Ramokgopa; South Africa	1:00.63
High jump	Toby Stolberg; Australia	1.78	Thea Brown; England	1.78	Izobelle Louison Roe; Australia Pooja Singh; India	1.75
Long jump	Delta Amidzowski; Australia	6.34	Jeannie de Gannes; Trinidad and Tobago	6.07	Grace Krause; Australia	6.01
Discus throw	Alicia Khunou; South Africa	49.53	Chelsey Wayne; Australia	49.39	Rafaella Aristolelous; Cyprus	42.74
Javelin throw	Ayesha Jones; England	52.49	Harriet Wheeler; England	51.50	Lo-an Anli; South Africa	50.12
Shot put	Elicia Elie; South Africa	17.97	Xylavene Beale; Australia	16.31	Sasi Anupriya; India	15.62

=== Mixed ===
Event	Gold		Silver		Bronze	
4×100 metres relay	Nigeria; Isreal Sunday Okon; Faith Okwose; Samuel Ogazi; Justina Eyakpobeyan	42.68	England; Mabel Akande; Teddy Wilson; Noah Hanson; Thea Brown	42.71	Trinidad and Tobago; Sanaa Frederick; Trevaughn Stewart; Sole Frederick; Jamario Russell	42.77
4×400 metres relay	Guyana; Malachi Austin; Narissa McPherson; Javon Roberts; Tianna Springer	3:22.07 GR	England; Alexander Beck; Charlotte Henrich; Stanley Chevous; Stephanie Okoro	3:22.29	Australia; Matthew Hunt; Charlotte McAuliffe; Jack Love; Jasynta Lampret	3:26.23

== Para-athletics ==
Boys

Event	Gold		Silver		Bronze	
100 metres T38	Tomi Robert-Jones; Wales	13.27	Ori Drabkin; Australia	13.30	Jackson Love; Australia	13.33
Long jump T38	Jackson Love; Australia	4.86	Ori Drabkin; Australia	4.62	William Bishop; Wales	4:44
Discus F42-44/F61-64	Daniel Tumiso; South Africa	26.34	Titus Maundu; Kenya	20.00	Tyler Smith; Grenada	18.85

Girls

Event	Gold		Silver		Bronze	
100 metres T38	Maddie Down; England	13.47	Indi Coper; Australia	14.01	Akeesha Snowden; Australia	14.53
Long jump T38	Maddie Down; England	4.70	Niamh Mac Alasdair; Australia	4.09	Reese Prior; Australia	3.73
Discus F42-44/F61-64	Destiny Nkemakonam Agbo; Nigeria	25.00	Bibi Jackson; England	24.24	Martha Winnie Nengola; Namibia	15.01

== Medal table ==
* Host nation (Trinidad and Tobago)

Rank	Nation	Gold	Silver	Bronze	Total
1	England	7	12	5	24
2	Nigeria	6	2	0	8
3	Australia	5	6	7	18
4	Kenya	5	4	0	9
5	South Africa	5	2	3	10
6	Guyana	2	1	1	4
7	Jamaica	2	0	2	4
8	Wales	1	0	1	2
9	Cayman Islands	1	0	0	1
10	Trinidad and Tobago	0	2	2	4
11	India	0	1	3	4
12	Uganda	0	1	2	3
13	Scotland	0	1	1	2
13	Sri Lanka	0	1	1	2
15	Bahamas	0	1	0	1
16	Saint Lucia	0	0	2	2
17	Antigua and Barbuda	0	0	1	1
17	Barbados	0	0	1	1
17	Cyprus	0	0	1	1
17	Grenada	0	0	1	1
17	Namibia	0	0	1	1
Totals (21 entries)		34	34	35	103
