= Justina Tiana Eyakpobeyan =

Nigerian athlete (born 2006)

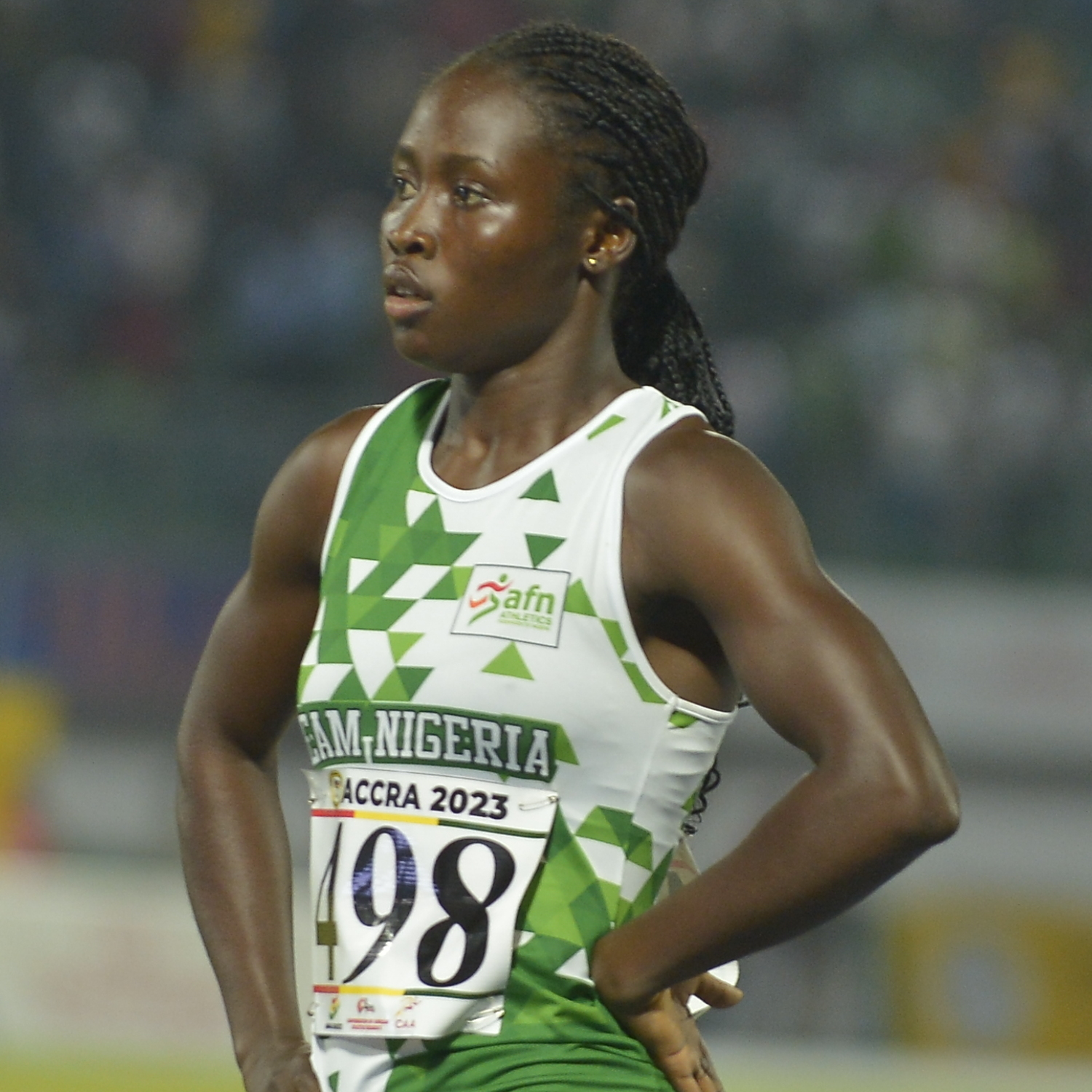
- Tiana Eyakpobeyan at the 2023 African Games

Personal information
- Nationality: Nigerian
- Born: 26 September 2006 (age 19)

Sport
- Sport: Athletics
- Event: Sprint

Achievements and titles
- Personal bests: 200m: 11.24 (2024); 200m: 23.53 (2023)
Medal record
Women's athletics
Representing Nigeria
African Games
Gold medal – first place	2023 Accra	4x100 m relay
African Championships
Gold medal – first place	2024 Douala	4×100 m relay
Commonwealth Youth Games
Gold medal – first place	2023 Trinbago	Mixed 4x100 m relay
Silver medal – second place	2023 Trinbago	100 m
Silver medal – second place	2023 Trinbago	200m

Justina Tiana Eyakpobeyan (born 26 September 2006) is a Nigerian sprinter. She won gold medals in the 4 x 100 metres relay at the 2023 African Games and 2024 African Athletics Championships. She competed at the 2024 Summer Olympics.

== Career ==
=== 2023 ===
In April 2023, she won double silver in the 100m and bronze in the 200m at the African U18 Championships in Ndola, Zambia. That year, she became Nigerian U-18 champion over both sprint distances and was selected for the 2018 Youth Commonwealth Games in Trinidad and Tobago where she won two silver medals in the 100m and 300m and added relay gold. She was also part of the senior Nigerian relay team for the 2023 World Athletics Championships in Budapest.

=== 2024 ===
She ran at the 2023 African Games in Accra and was part of their 4 × 100 metres relay side which won gold.

She was part of the Nigerian 4 × 100 m relay team that competed at the 2024 World Athletics Relays in Nassau, Bahamas, and successfully qualified for the 2024 Olympic Games.

She won gold in the 4 × 100 m relay at the 2024 African Championships in Athletics in Douala, Cameroon in a new championship record time.

She competed in the 4 x 100 metres relay at the 2024 Paris Olympics.
