= Samuel Ogazi =

Nigerian sprinter (born 2006)

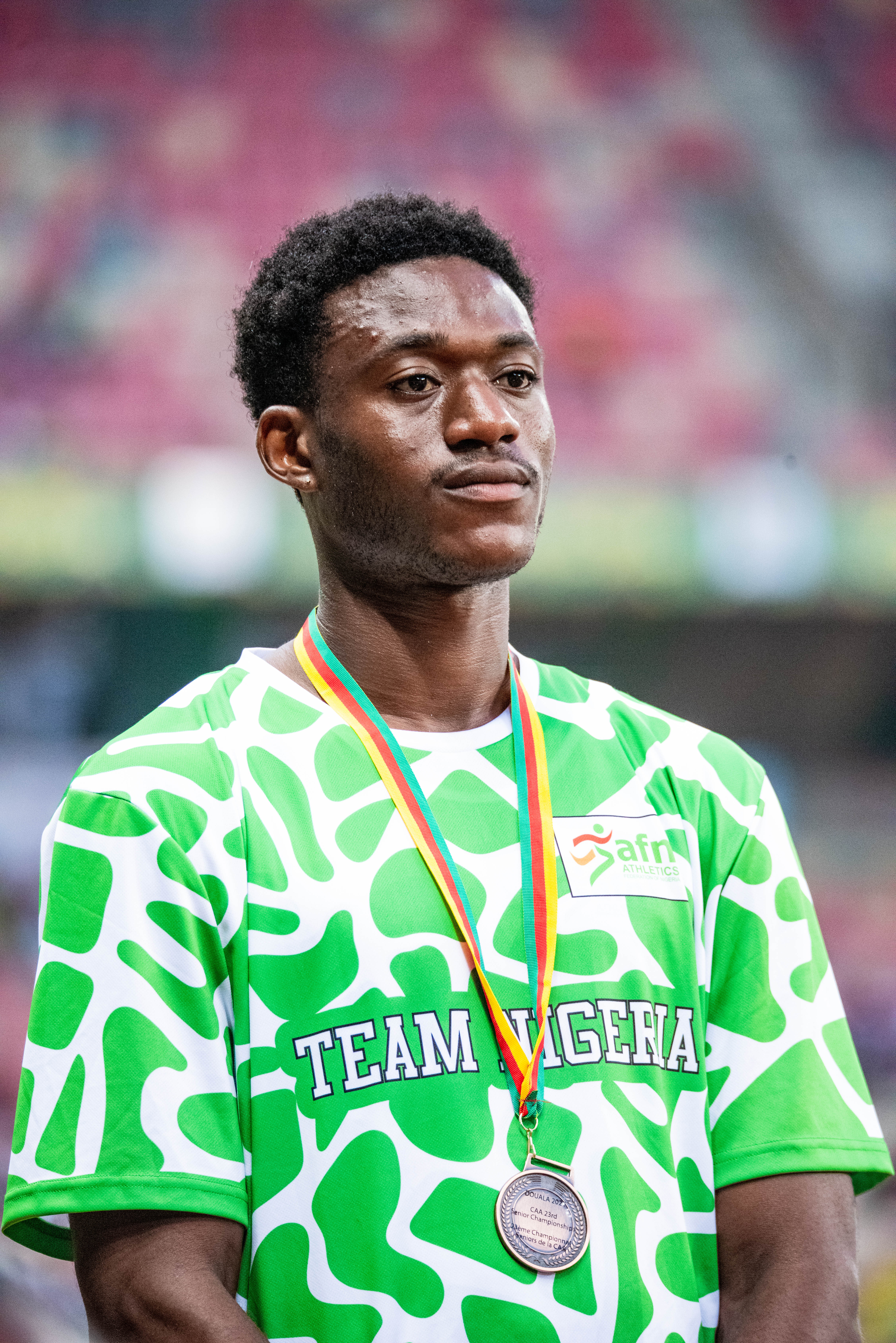
- Ogazi in 2024

Personal information
- Nationality: Nigerian
- Born: 14 May 2006 (age 20)

Sport
- Sport: Athletics
- Event: Sprint

Achievements and titles
- Personal bests: 100 m: 10.90 (Abuja, 2022); 200 m: 20.54 (Tuscaloosa, 2026); 400 m: 43.38 (Eugene, 2026) NR; Indoor; 400 m: 44.57 (Fayetteville, 2026) AR
Medal record
Men's athletics
Representing Nigeria
Commonwealth Games
Gold medal – first place	2026 Glasgow	400 m
Bronze medal – third place	2026 Glasgow	Mixed 4x400 m relay
African Championships
Bronze medal – third place	2024 Douala	400 m
Commonwealth Youth Games
Gold medal – first place	2023 Trinbago	200 m
Gold medal – first place	2023 Trinbago	400 m
Gold medal – first place	2023 Trinbago	Mixed 4x100 m relay
African U18 Championships
Gold medal – first place	2023 Ndola	200m
Gold medal – first place	2023 Ndola	400m

Samuel Uchenna Ogazi (born 14 May 2006) is a Nigerian sprinter. He is the Nigerian national record holder over 400 metres and the African record holder over 400 metres indoors. In 2026, he won the gold medal at the Commonwealth Games and won both the NCAA Indoor Championships and NCAA Outdoor Championships titles in the United States, having also won the NCAA outdoor title in 2025.

Ogazi was a bronze medalist at the 2024 African Championships and competed for Nigeria at the 2024 Olympic Games and 2025 World Championships.

== Biography ==
Ogazi was based as a teenager in Kaduna. Ogazi competed in the 4 × 400 m relay at the 2022 World Athletics U20 Championships in Cali, Colombia.

Ogazi won the 200m and 400m at the African U18 Championships in Ndola, Zambia. He won gold over 200 metres and 400 metres at the Athletics at the 2023 Commonwealth Youth Games in Trinidad and Tobago. He also won gold in the mixed 4 × 100 m relay as his Nigerian team set a new games record. In 2023, he accepted a scholarship to study at the University of Alabama.

In March 2024, Ogazi set a new Nigerian under-18 record for the 400 metres, running 45.35s to finish second overall behind Christopher Morales Williams in Louisiana. The following month he lowered his personal best to 45.29 seconds in Florida. Ogazi competed for Nigeria at the 2024 World Athletics Relays in Nassau, Bahamas. With a time of 3:12.87, the Nigerian Mixed 4x400m team of Ogazi, Ella Onojuvwevwo, Chidi Okezie and Esther Joseph set a new Nigerian national record and African Continental record at the event on 5 May 2024. Later that month he lowered his personal best to 44.53 seconds in Lexington, Kentucky. He was runner-up at the 2024 NCAA Division I Outdoor Track and Field Championships in Eugene, Oregon, running 44.52 seconds. In June 2024, Ogazi won bronze in the 400 metres at the African Championships in Douala, Cameroon. He competed at the 2024 Summer Olympics over 400 metres in August 2024, where he ran a personal best on his way to the final, where he placed seventh overall. He also competed in the mixed 4 × 400 m relay at the Games.

Ogazi won the 400 metres title at the 2025 SEC Championships in Lexington, Kentucky in May 2025. In June 2025, he also won the 2025 NCAA Outdoor Championships 400 metres title in Eugene, Oregon. Ogazi was selected for the Nigerian team for the 2025 World Athletics Championships in Tokyo, Japan. He ran in the heats of the men's 400 metres without advancing to the semi-finals, later revealing that he ran with a leg injury.

In February 2026, Ogazi competed at the New Mexico Collegiate Classic, in Albuquerque, and ran an indoor personal best of 44.85 seconds for the 400 metres. That month, he ran a facility record time of 44.72 seconds to win the 400 metres at the SEC Indoor Championships. On 14 March, he set an African indoor record as he won the 400 metres at the 2026 NCAA Indoor Championships in Fayetteville, running 44.57 seconds to move to fourth on the world all-time indoors list.

On 2 May 2026, Ogazi ran a personal best and joint world-leading time of 44.02 in Athens, Georgia, USA. The mark ties him for the seventh-fastest time in NCAA history and breaks the long-standing Nigerian national record of 44.17 set by Innocent Egbunike in 1987, elevating him to sixth on the African all-time list. On 17 May 2026, Ogazi ran 43.95 in the men’s 400 m at the SEC Championships, becoming the fifth-fastest man in collegiate history. Ogazi ran in the NCAA East Regionals between 27 and 30 May 2026. Ogazi ran the preliminaries at 44.61 seconds in the men's 400 metres. In the quarterfinal round on May 29, Ogazi improved on his world-leading time in the event with 43.82 seconds. On 12 June, Ogazi won the 400 metres at the 2026 NCAA Division I Outdoor Track and Field Championships in a new personal best and world-leading time of 43.38 seconds. This time put him fourth on the world all-time list and broke the NCAA record for the 400 metres previously held by Michael Norman. Ogazi ran 44.57 seconds on 10 July to win the 400 metres in Memphis, Tennessee at the Ed Murphey Classic. On 1 August, he won the 400 metres final at the 2026 Commonwealth Games in Glasgow, Scotland, running 44.25 seconds in the final. Later that day, he won a bronze medal in the final of the mixed 4 x 400 metres relay.
