= Nancy Cherop =

Kenyan athlete

Personal information
- Nationality: Kenyan
- Born: 2 May 2004 (age 22)

Sport
- Sport: Athletics
- Events: Middle distance, Cross country

Achievements and titles
- Personal bests: 800m: 2:05.88 (Ndola, 2023); 1500m: 4:09.90 (Nairobi, 2023); 3000m: 8:52.86 (Nairobi, 2022); 5000m: 16:12.78 (Nairobi, 2023)
Medal record
Women's athletics
Representing Kenya
World U20 Championships
Bronze medal – third place	2022 Cali	3000 m
Commonwealth Youth Games
Gold medal – first place	2023 Trinbago	1500 m
Gold medal – first place	2023 Trinbago	3000 m

Nancy Cherop (born 2 May 2004) is a Kenyan middle distance and cross country runner.

== Early life ==
Ten daughter of Geoffrey Kiprotich and niece of James Kwalia, Cherop attended Chelebei Secondary School in Mount Elgon.

== Career ==
In 2022, she won a bronze medal at the 2022 World Athletics U20 Championships in Cali, Colombia over 3000 metres in a time of 9:05.85.

Cherop was selected for the 2023 World Athletics Cross Country Championships but was unable to travel to Australia due to a VISA issue. She won gold medals at the 2023 African U18 Championships in Ndola, Zambia in April 2023, winning over 800 metres, and 1500 metres. She set a new 1500 personal best finishing sixth at the senior Kenyan national championships in Nairobi in June 2023, running 4:09.90. In August 2023, she was the winner of golds in both the 1500m and 3000m at the 2023 Commonwealth Youth Games in Trinidad and Tobago, setting a new games record over 1500m of 4:12.38.

She was selected for the 2024 World Cross Country Championships in Serbia.
