= Athletics at the 2019 African Games – Women's 4 × 400 metres relay =

The women's 4 × 400 metres relay event at the 2019 African Games was held on 30 August in Rabat.

== Results ==
Rank	Nation	Athletes	Time	Notes
1st place, gold medalist(s)	Nigeria	Kemi Francis, Patience Okon George, Blessing Oladoye, Favour Ofili	3:30.32	
2nd place, silver medalist(s)	Botswana	Oarabile Babolayi, Oratile Nowe, Amantle Montsho, Galefele Moroko	3:31.96	
3rd place, bronze medalist(s)	Uganda	Stella Wonruku, Nasiba Nabirye, Emily Nanziri, Leni Shida	3:32.25	
4	Kenya	Linda Kageha, Joan Cherono, Maureen Nyatichi Thomas, Mary Moraa	3:32.93	
5	South Africa	Taylon Bieldt, Wenda Nel, Danel Holton, Zeney van der Walt	3:41.17	
6	Ethiopia	Tsige Duguma, Getachew Migist, Msgana Haylu, Worknesh Mesele	3:41.45	
7	Sierra Leone	Maggie Barrie, Elma Sesay, Fatmata Awolo, Mary Thomas Tarawally	3:47.74	
	Madagascar		DNS	
