= Faith Okwose =

Nigerian sprinter (born 2006)

Personal information
- Nationality: Nigerian
- Born: 27 May 2006 (age 20)

Sport
- Sport: Athletics
- Event: Sprinter

Achievements and titles
- Personal bests: 60m 7.21 (Nashville, 2025); 100m 11.26 (Port of Spain, 2023); 200m 23.31 (Ndola, 2023)
Medal record
Women's athletics
Representing Nigeria
Commonwealth Youth Games
Gold medal – first place	2023 Trinbago	100 m
Gold medal – first place	2023 Trinbago	200m
Gold medal – first place	2023 Trinbago	Mixed 4x100 m relay

Faith Okwose (born 27 May 2006) is a Nigerian sprinter. She became the Nigerian national champion over 200 metres in 2023.

== Early life ==
From Delta State in Nigeria. She earned a scholarship to University of Alabama in the United States before later transferring to the University of Tennessee.

== Career ==
In 2022, she was runner-up in the 100 metres at the Asaba 2022 Sports Festival, running 11.50 seconds. She also won the silver medal at the same event in the 200 metres.

In April 2023, she won double gold at the African U18 Championships in the 100m and 200m, in Ndola, Zambia.

In June 2023, she set a new 100m personal best of 11.35 seconds in Uya Oro, Akwa Ibom State. In July 2023, she won the 200 metres at the Nigerian National Championships in Benin City. At the championships she also ran 11.51 seconds in the final of the 100 metres to finish behind Blessing Ogundiran.

In August 2023, she was a double gold medalist in the individual sprint events at the 2023 Commonwealth Youth Games, winning in both the 100 metres and the 200 metres in Trinidad, setting a new games record in the 100m of 11.26 seconds. She also won gold in the mixed 4x100 metres relay.

She was part of the Nigerian 4 × 100 m relay team at the 2023 World Athletics Championships in Budapest.

In February 2024, she set a new 60m personal best time of 7.56 seconds in New Mexico. She improved that personal best to 7.21 seconds in Nashville in December 2025, a time that ranked eighth in school history for the University of Tennessee.
