= Blessing Oladoye =

Nigerian sprinter

Personal information
- Nationality: Nigerian
- Born: 4 September 2000 (age 25)

Sport
- Sport: Athletics
- Event: Sprinting

Blessing Oladoye (born 4 September 2000) is a Nigerian athlete. She competed in the women's 4 × 400 metres relay event at the 2019 World Athletics Championships. In 2019, she won the gold medal in the women's 4 × 400 metres relay at the 2019 African Games held in Rabat, Morocco.
