= Aniekeme Alphonsus =

Nigerian athlete

Personal information
- Full name: Aniekeme Alphonsus
- Born: 25 December 1999 (age 26) Maiduguri, Nigeria

Sport
- Sport: Athletics, sprint and middle distance races
Medal record
Women's Athletics
Representing Nigeria
African U20 Championships in Athletics
Silver medal – second place	2015 Addis Ababa	100 m
Gold medal – first place	2015 Addis Ababa	4 × 400 m

Aniekeme Alphonsus (born 25 December 1999) is a Nigerian athlete who competes in sprint and middle-distance races. She won a gold and silver medal in the 4 × 100 meter relay and 100 m race, at the 2015 African Junior Athletics Championships.

== Sports career ==
She participated in 100 m and 200 m race in the 2014 Nigerian Youth Championships (U18) held in Ijebu Ode (Nigeria). She claimed the gold medal after coming in 1st, with Favor Ekezie and Abolaji Omotayo Oluwaseun ending up with the silver and bronze medals respectively. Aniekeme participated in the 2015 African Junior Athletics Championships. At the 100 m race, she came in second after Tamzin Thomas with a time of 11.83s and won the silver medal. She also participated in the 4 × 100 metres relay. Nigeria ended up with a time record of 44.83, a new championship record and won the gold medal.

At the 2015 African Youth Athletics Championships, she participated in the Medley relay and the Nigerian team won the gold medal with a performance record of 2:08.71. She also participated in the Long jump event. She claimed the silver medal with a performance result of 5.50 m. Aniekeme participated in the 2015 Commonwealth Youth Games 100 m, 200 m, 4 × 100 metres relay, 4 × 200 metres relay and 4 × 400 metres relay. She came in at 11.64 earning herself a silver medal in the 100 m race. With a record of 23.63 at the 200 m, she came in 3rd and won the bronze medal. The Nigerian team recorded a time of 45.86 and came in first place owning the gold medal at the 4 × 100 metres relay. The Nigerian team also won the gold medals at the 4 × 200 m and 4 × 400 m relay.

2016 & 2017

At the 2016 IAAF World U20 Championships - Women's 200 metres and 100 m, Aniekeme participated but did not reach the semifinals. The team appeared in the 4 × 100 m in the 2017 World Championships but did not advance to the finals.

At the All-Nigeria Track and Field Championships held at the Abuja, she claims 1st Senior 100 m National title with a time record of 11.52s.

== See also ==
- List of African youth bests in athletics
