= Athletics at the 2023 Arab Games – Results =

These are the official results of the athletics competition at the 2023 Arab Games which took place between 4 and 7 July 2023 in Oran, Algeria.

== Men's results ==
=== 100 metres ===
Heats – 4 July
Wind:
Heat 1: ? m/s, Heat 2: ? m/s

Rank	Heat	Name	Nationality	Time	Notes
1	2	Saeed Al-Khaldi	Bahrain	10.27	Q
2	1	Chakir Machmour	Morocco	10.39	Q
3	1	Ali Anwar Al-Balushi	Oman	10.46	Q
4	2	Barakat Al-Harthi	Oman	10.67	Q
5	2	Mohamed Hassan Al-Noubi	United Arab Emirates	10.68	Q
6	2	Idriss Laredj	Algeria	10.70	q
7	1	Bilal Thiyab	Jordan	10.71	Q
8	1	Hakim Guettouche	Algeria	10.74	q
9	1	Sidi Boubacar Bourdillat	Mauritania	12.34	
	1	Omar Ebrahim	Bahrain	DQ	FS
	2	Abdulaziz Al-Jadani	Saudi Arabia	DQ	
	2	Mohamed Abdalla	Sudan	DNS	

Final – 5 July

Wind: +0.4 m/s

Rank	Lane	Name	Nationality	Time	Notes
1st place, gold medalist(s)	7	Saeed Al-Khaldi	Bahrain	10.22	PB
2nd place, silver medalist(s)	5	Chakir Machmour	Morocco	10.24	
3rd place, bronze medalist(s)	4	Barakat Al-Harthi	Oman	10.37	
4	6	Ali Anwar Al-Balushi	Oman	10.59	
5	3	Hakim Guettouche	Algeria	10.68	
6	2	Idriss Laredj	Algeria	10.70	
7	8	Bilal Thiyab	Jordan	10.71	
8	9	Mohamed Hassan Al-Noubi	United Arab Emirates	10.83	

=== 200 metres ===
Heats – 6 July
Wind:
Heat 1: +0.5 m/s, Heat 2: +0.5 m/s

Rank	Heat	Name	Nationality	Time	Notes
1	2	Chakir Machmour	Morocco	20.84	Q
2	1	Taha Hussein Yaseen	Iraq	20.95	Q
3	2	Mohamed Obaid Al-Saadi	Oman	21.00	Q
4	1	Yaqoob Salem Yaqoob	Bahrain	21.10	Q
5	1	Djamil Skandar Athmani	Algeria	21.14	Q
6	2	Adem Abdelkader Benyache	Algeria	21.28	Q
7	1	Rashid Al-Aasmi	Oman	21.34	q
8	2	Husain Mohamed Al-Doseri	Bahrain	21.65	q
9	1	Shaker Abdullah Al-Salim	Saudi Arabia	21.66	
10	2	Abdulaziz Rabie Al-Jadani	Saudi Arabia	21.84	
11	1	Bilal Thiyab	Jordan	21.88	
12	1	Ahmed Al-Yaari	Yemen	22.27	NR
	2	Mohamed Hassan Al-Noubi	United Arab Emirates	DNF	
	2	Mohamed Abdalla	Sudan	DNS	

Final – 7 July

Wind: +0.9 m/s

Rank	Lane	Name	Nationality	Time	Notes
1st place, gold medalist(s)	4	Chakir Machmour	Morocco	20.73	PB
2nd place, silver medalist(s)	6	Mohamed Obaid Al-Saadi	Oman	20.94	
3rd place, bronze medalist(s)	5	Taha Hussein Yaseen	Iraq	20.99	
4	7	Djamil Skandar Athmani	Algeria	21.21	
5	2	Rashid Al-Aasmi	Oman	21.33	
6	8	Adem Abdelkader Benyache	Algeria	21.34	
7	1	Husain Mohamed Al-Doseri	Bahrain	21.76	
	3	Yaqoob Salem Yaqoob	Bahrain	DNS	

=== 400 metres ===
Heats – 4 July

Rank	Heat	Name	Nationality	Time	Notes
1	1	Yusuf Ali Abbas	Bahrain	45.76	Q
2	2	Ashraf Hussen Osman	Qatar	45.97	Q
3	2	Moussa Ali Issa	Bahrain	46.03	Q
4	2	Hamza Dair	Morocco	46.55	Q
5	1	Aymane El Haddaoui	Morocco	46.89	Q
6	2	Mouatez Abderrazek Sikiou	Algeria	46.93	q
7	1	Fouad Hamada	Algeria	47.03	Q, PB
8	1	Rami Balti	Tunisia	47.16	q
9	1	Yasir Ali Al-Saadi	Iraq	47.25	
10	1	Sultan Salman Saif	United Arab Emirates	49.99	
11	2	Mubarak Alameri Mufarj	United Arab Emirates	50.52	
12	2	Hassan Abdo	Saudi Arabia	51.03	
	1	Anbar Jamaan Al-Zahranii	Saudi Arabia	DNF	

Final – 5 July

Rank	Lane	Name	Nationality	Time	Notes
1st place, gold medalist(s)	4	Ashraf Hussen Osman	Qatar	45.26	
2nd place, silver medalist(s)	7	Hamza Dair	Morocco	45.81	
3rd place, bronze medalist(s)	6	Moussa Ali Issa	Bahrain	45.85	PB
4	3	Yusuf Ali Abbas	Bahrain	45.92	
5	5	Aymane El Haddaoui	Morocco	46.45	
6	8	Fouad Hamada	Algeria	46.54	PB
7	2	Rami Balti	Tunisia	46.83	
8	1	Mouatez Abderrazek Sikiou	Algeria	47.33	

=== 800 metres ===
7 July

Rank	Name	Nationality	Time	Notes
1st place, gold medalist(s)	Slimane Moula	Algeria	1:46.87	
2nd place, silver medalist(s)	Essa Ali̇s Kzwani	Saudi Arabia	1:47.71	
3rd place, bronze medalist(s)	Abdessalem Ayouni	Tunisia	1:48.19	
4	Abdullah Al-Yaari	Yemen	1:48.52	
5	Ramzi Abdenouz	Algeria	1:48.87	
6	Riadh Chninni	Tunisia	1:50.25	
7	Mohammed Al-Suleimani	Oman	1:51.72	
8	Mohamed Mustafa	Sudan	1:54.16	
9	Mohammed Dwedar	Palestine	1:56.95	
10	Awwad Al-Sharafat	Jordan	1:57.16	
	Mohammed Tiouali	Bahrain	DNS	

=== 1500 metres ===
5 July

Rank	Name	Nationality	Time	Notes
1st place, gold medalist(s)	Abdelatif Sadiki	Morocco	3:37.61	
2nd place, silver medalist(s)	Fouad Messaoudi	Morocco	3:37.99	
3rd place, bronze medalist(s)	Zouhaïr Aouad	Bahrain	3:38.17	PB
4	Salim Keddar	Algeria	3:38.47	
5	Fayez Abdullah Al-Subaie	Saudi Arabia	3:39.24	PB
6	Abderrazak Khelili	Algeria	3:39.39	PB
7	Hussain Mohsen Al-Farisi	Oman	3:48.88	
8	Tamer Qaoud	Palestine	3:54.87	NU20R
	Awwad Al-Sharafat	Jordan	DNF	
	Mohammed Ayoub Tiouali	Bahrain	DNF	
	Mohamed Ismail	Sudan	DNS	
	Yaseen Abdalla	Sudan	DNS	

=== 5000 metres ===
7 July

Rank	Name	Nationality	Time	Notes
1st place, gold medalist(s)	Birhanu Balew	Bahrain	14:21.89	
2nd place, silver medalist(s)	Hafid Rizky	Morocco	14:23.32	
3rd place, bronze medalist(s)	Salim Keddar	Algeria	14:23.47	
4	Dawit Fikadu	Bahrain	14:24.71	
5	Ali Guerine	Algeria	14:27.46	
6	Yaseen Abdalla	Sudan	14:27.91	
7	Taha Erraouy	Morocco	14:27.91	
8	Mohamed Abdi Zaqaria	Sudan	14:36.75	PB
9	Mohamed Ali Hassan	Somalia	15:11.58	PB
	Yousif Musa	Sudan	DNS	

=== 10,000 metres ===
4 July

Rank	Name	Nationality	Time	Notes
1st place, gold medalist(s)	Dawit Fikadu	Bahrain	29:08.80	
2nd place, silver medalist(s)	Mouhcine Outalha	Morocco	29:17.40	
3rd place, bronze medalist(s)	Youcef Addouche	Algeria	29:21.90	
4	Said Ameri	Algeria	29:24.20	
	Ethmane Mahmoud	Mauritania	DNF	
	Birhanu Balew	Bahrain	DNS	

=== 110 metres hurdles ===
5 July
Wind: +0.3 m/s

Rank	Lane	Name	Nationality	Time	Notes
1st place, gold medalist(s)	3	Amine Bouanani	Algeria	13.58	
2nd place, silver medalist(s)	4	Yaqoub Al-Youha	Kuwait	13.67	
3rd place, bronze medalist(s)	2	Oumar Abakar	Qatar	14.20	PB
4	8	Shaker Abdullah Al-Salim	Saudi Arabia	14.34	
5	7	Ayoub Bensabra	Algeria	14.40	
6	6	Atiah Mohammed Al-Shamrani	Saudi Arabia	18.81	
	5	Mohamed Koussi	Morocco	DNS	

=== 400 metres hurdles ===
Heats – 6 July

Rank	Heat	Name	Nationality	Time	Notes
1	1	Saber Boukemouche	Algeria	50.85	Q
2	1	El Mehdi Dimocrati	Morocco	50.89	Q
3	2	Abdelmalik Lahoulou	Algeria	50.97	Q
4	1	Mohamed Amine Touati	Tunisia	50.98	Q
5	2	Bassem Hemeida	Qatar	51.23	Q
6	2	Saad Hinti	Morocco	51.46	Q
7	2	Mohamed Abdullah Al-Amrad	Saudi Arabia	51.65	q
8	1	Jassem Waleed Al-Mass	Kuwait	52.30	q
9	2	Abdullah Djmat Mohamed	Bahrain	53.68	
10	2	Muath Abdalla	United Arab Emirates	55.26	
11	1	Azzam Ibrahim Abu Bakr	Saudi Arabia	?	

Final – 7 July

Rank	Lane	Name	Nationality	Time	Notes
1st place, gold medalist(s)	3	Bassem Hemeida	Qatar	49.17	
2nd place, silver medalist(s)	4	Abdelmalik Lahoulou	Algeria	49.47	
3rd place, bronze medalist(s)	6	Saber Boukemouche	Algeria	50.10	
4	1	Jassem Waleed Al-Mass	Kuwait	52.34	
5	2	Mohamed Abdullah Al-Amrad	Saudi Arabia	53.29	
6	8	Mohamed Amine Touati	Tunisia	1:04.86	
	5	El Mehdi Dimocrati	Morocco	DNF	
	7	Saad Hinti	Morocco	DNS	

=== 3000 metres steeplechase ===
5 July

Rank	Name	Nationality	Time	Notes
1st place, gold medalist(s)	Hichem Bouchicha	Algeria	8:24.04	
2nd place, silver medalist(s)	Bilal Tabti	Algeria	8:25.32	
3rd place, bronze medalist(s)	Salaheddine Ben Yazide	Morocco	8:28.59	
4	Ebrahim Jridi	Tunisia	8:30.94	
5	Mohamed Abdullah Mahal	Iraq	8:41.17	
6	John Kibet Koech	Bahrain	8:53.94	

=== 4 × 100 metres relay ===
6 July

Rank	Lane	Nation	Athletes	Time	Notes
1st place, gold medalist(s)	5	Oman	Rashid Al-Aasmi, Barakat Al-Harthi, Mohamed Obaid Al-Saadi, Ali Anwar Ali Al-Balushi	39.70	
2nd place, silver medalist(s)	3	Bahrain	Omar Ebrahim, Yaqoob Salem Yaqoob, Husain Al-Doseri, Saeed Al-Khaldi	40.19	
3rd place, bronze medalist(s)	4	Algeria	Hakim Guettouche, Adem Abdelkader Benyache, Idriss Lardj, Djamil Skandar Athmani	40.19	

=== 4 × 400 metres relay ===
7 July

Rank	Lane	Nation	Athletes	Time	Notes
1st place, gold medalist(s)	3	Algeria	Fouad Hamada, Mohamed Ali Gouaned, Djamel Sedjati, Slimane Moula	3:02.84	
2nd place, silver medalist(s)	4	Morocco	Nadir El Haddaoui, Rachid Mhamdi, El Mehdi Dimokrati, Hamza Dair	3:04.94	
3rd place, bronze medalist(s)	2	Iraq	Yasir Ali Al-Saadi, Mohamed Al-Baqer, Mohammed Abdulridha Al-Tameemi, Taha Hussein Yaseen	3:06.37	
4	7	Bahrain	Abdullah Djmat Mohamed, Yusuf Ali Abbas, Zouhaïr Aouad, Moussa Ali Issa	3:21.51	
	5	United Arab Emirates		DNS	
	6	Saudi Arabia		DNS	
	8	Tunisia		DNS	

=== 20 kilometres walk ===
5 July

Rank	Name	Nationality	Time	Notes
1st place, gold medalist(s)	Sohail Abderrahmane Aloui	Algeria	1:31:56	
2nd place, silver medalist(s)	Abdennour Ameur	Algeria	1:36:17	
3rd place, bronze medalist(s)	Alnuami Alshaal	United Arab Emirates	1:43:31	
4	Aboud Khaled Joudeh	Jordan	2:02.55	

=== High jump ===
4 July

Rank	Name	Nationality	Result	Notes
1st place, gold medalist(s)	Fathi Abdul Ghafoor	Oman	2.16	NR
2nd place, silver medalist(s)	Hamdi Ali	Qatar	2.16	
3rd place, bronze medalist(s)	Hicham Bouhanoun	Algeria	2.13	
4	Bilel Afer	Algeria	2.13	
5	Hussein Falah Al-Ibrahimi	Iraq	2.05	

=== Pole vault ===
5 July

Rank	Name	Nationality	Result	Notes
1st place, gold medalist(s)	Seifeldin Heneida Abdesalam	Qatar	5.51	MR
2nd place, silver medalist(s)	Medhi Amar Rouana	Algeria	5.30	
3rd place, bronze medalist(s)	Amir Faleh Abdulwahid	Iraq	5.00	
4	Ameer Saihood	Iraq	5.00	

=== Long jump ===
7 July

Rank	Name	Nationality	Result	Notes
1st place, gold medalist(s)	Yasser Triki	Algeria	7.83	
2nd place, silver medalist(s)	Zayed Latif	Morocco	7.60	
3rd place, bronze medalist(s)	Salim Saleh Al-Yarabi	Oman	7.55	
4	Tarek Hocine	Algeria	7.47	
5	Abdulrahman Sharaheli	Saudi Arabia	7.41	
6	Salem Al-Bloushi	United Arab Emirates	7.00	
	Ahmed Faiz Binmarzouq	Saudi Arabia	DNS	
	Abdullah Al-Azemi	Kuwait	DNS	

=== Triple jump ===
6 July

Rank	Name	Nationality	Result	Notes
1st place, gold medalist(s)	Yasser Triki	Algeria	17.30	
2nd place, silver medalist(s)	Adem Boualbani	Algeria	16.35	
3rd place, bronze medalist(s)	Salim Saleh Al-Yarabi	Oman	15.41	
4	Oumar Moussa	Bahrain	15.18	

=== Shot put ===
4 July

Rank	Name	Nationality	Result	Notes
1st place, gold medalist(s)	Mostafa Amr Hassan	Egypt	20.52	
2nd place, silver medalist(s)	Abdelrahman Mahmoud	Bahrain	19.17	
3rd place, bronze medalist(s)	Musaeb Al-Momani	Jordan	17.18	
4	Mohamed Redha Bouziane	Algeria	15.66	
5	Sirine Mohamed	Algeria	14.95	

=== Discus throw ===
5 July

Rank	Name	Nationality	Result	Notes
1st place, gold medalist(s)	Mouad Mohamed Ibrahim	Qatar	62.48	PB
2nd place, silver medalist(s)	Essa Al-Zenkawi	Kuwait	61.48	
3rd place, bronze medalist(s)	Oussama Khennoussi	Algeria	58.25	
4	Marawan Medany	Bahrain	55.37	
5	Musaeb Al-Momani	Jordan	54.80	
6	Mohamed Mansour Ouadhah	Libya	54.24	
7	Abdelmoumne Bourakba	Algeria	53.37	
8	Oussama Hassan Al-Aqili	Saudi Arabia	51.63	

=== Hammer throw ===
7 July

Rank	Name	Nationality	Result	Notes
1st place, gold medalist(s)	Mostafa El Gamel	Egypt	76.48	
2nd place, silver medalist(s)	Ahmed Amgad El Seify	Qatar	69.61	
3rd place, bronze medalist(s)	Mohsen Anani	Tunisia	67.69	
4	Mohamad Abdallah Al-Zayr	Saudi Arabia	64.14	
5	Mahmoud El-Gohary	Bahrain	61.85	
6	Lazhar Yakoubi	Algeria	57.62	

=== Javelin throw ===
6 July

Rank	Name	Nationality	Result	Notes
1st place, gold medalist(s)	Ihab Abdelrahman	Egypt	80.50	
2nd place, silver medalist(s)	Ali Essa Abdelghani	Saudi Arabia	73.54	
3rd place, bronze medalist(s)	Abdulrahman Al-Azemi	Kuwait	70.83	
4	Mahieddine Boukhatala	Algeria	63.41	

=== Decathlon ===
6–7 July

The highest mark recorded in each event is highlighted in yellow

Rank	Athlete	Nationality	100m	LJ	SP	HJ	400m	110m H	DT	PV	JT	1500m	Points	Notes
1st place, gold medalist(s)	Larbi Bouraada	Algeria	11.18	6.77	12.34	1.93	50.07	15.04	38.38	4.50	57.15	4:41.48	7362	
2nd place, silver medalist(s)	Dhiae Boudoumi	Algeria	10.97	7.02	10.68	1.96	47.40	15.87	30.70	3.40	46.79	4:10.27	7019	PB
3rd place, bronze medalist(s)	Abdul Sajjad Saadoun Nasser	Iraq	11.91	6.88	10.96	1.99	50.15	15.42	32.14	4.20	42.94	4:08.10	6958	

== Women's results ==
=== 100 metres ===
5 July
Wind: +0.9 m/s

Rank	Lane	Name	Nationality	Time	Notes
1st place, gold medalist(s)	3	Edidiong Odiong	Bahrain	11.27	
2nd place, silver medalist(s)	6	Hajar Saad Al-Khaldi	Bahrain	11.35	
3rd place, bronze medalist(s)	4	Mudhawi Al-Shammari	Kuwait	11.56	
4	9	Mazoon Al-Alawi	Oman	11.72	
5	8	Hajar Edaou	Morocco	11.83	
6	2	Manel Benkaci	Algeria	11.95	
7	1	Diya Rafiq	Iraq	12.71	
8	7	Yara Ahmed Abuljadayel	Saudi Arabia	13.26	
	5	Nadia Aitabdelaziz	Algeria	DNF	
	10	Imane Mekrazi	Morocco	DQ	FS

=== 200 metres ===
Heats – 6 July
Wind:
Heat 1: +1.1 m/s, Heat 2: +1.1 m/s

Rank	Heat	Name	Nationality	Time	Notes
1	2	Hajar Saad Al-Khaldi	Bahrain	23.55	Q
2	1	Edidiong Odiong	Bahrain	23.58	Q
3	2	Sara El Hachimi	Morocco	24.06	Q
4	1	Chaima Ouanis	Algeria	24.28	Q
5	1	Salma Lhilali	Morocco	24.45	Q
6	1	Mudhawi Al-Shammari	Kuwait	24.46	q
7	2	Djamila Zine	Algeria	24.51	Q
8	2	Aliya Boshnak	Jordan	25.76	q
9	1	Diya Rafiq	Iraq	25.94	PB
10	2	Fatma Al-Blooshi	United Arab Emirates	26.55	
11	1	Yara Ahmed Abuljadayel	Saudi Arabia	27.71	

Final – 7 July

Wind: +0.4 m/s

Rank	Lane	Name	Nationality	Time	Notes
1st place, gold medalist(s)	5	Hajar Saad Al-Khaldi	Bahrain	23.30	
2nd place, silver medalist(s)	3	Edidiong Odiong	Bahrain	23.74	
3rd place, bronze medalist(s)	6	Sara El Hachimi	Morocco	23.89	
4	2	Mudhawi Al-Shammari	Kuwait	23.90	
5	4	Chaima Ouanis	Algeria	24.34	
6	7	Djamila Zine	Algeria	24.40	
7	8	Salma Lhilali	Morocco	24.72	
8	1	Aliya Boshnak	Jordan	25.84	

=== 400 metres ===
Heats – 4 July

Rank	Heat	Name	Nationality	Time	Notes
1	1	Kemi Adekoya	Bahrain	52.51	Q
2	2	Salma Lhilali	Morocco	53.94	Q
3	2	Djamila Zine	Algeria	54.64	Q, OB
4	1	Sara El Hachimi	Morocco	54.65	Q
5	2	Zeinab Ali Mahamat	Bahrain	54.92	Q
6	1	Chaima Ouanis	Algeria	56.72	Q
7	1	Aliya Boshnak	Jordan	57.52	q
8	2	Aveen Shaheen	Iraq	58.56	q
9	2	Fatma Al-Blooshi	United Arab Emirates	1:01.50	
	1	Sarah Al-Helal	Saudi Arabia	DNS	

Final – 5 July

Rank	Lane	Name	Nationality	Time	Notes
1st place, gold medalist(s)	4	Kemi Adekoya	Bahrain	51.02	
2nd place, silver medalist(s)	6	Salma Lhilali	Morocco	52.98	PB
3rd place, bronze medalist(s)	3	Sara El Hachimi	Morocco	53.38	PB
4	8	Zeinab Ali Mahamat	Bahrain	53.99	
5	5	Djamila Zine	Algeria	54.08	PB
6	7	Chaima Ouanis	Algeria	56.15	
7	1	Aliya Boshnak	Jordan	57.23	
8	2	Aveen Shaheen	Iraq	58.26	

=== 800 metres ===
7 July

Rank	Name	Nationality	Time	Notes
1st place, gold medalist(s)	Assia Raziki	Morocco	2:05.17	
2nd place, silver medalist(s)	Marta Hirpato	Bahrain	2:05.47	
3rd place, bronze medalist(s)	Wafa Zaroual	Morocco	2:07.29	
4	Rokaia Mouici	Algeria	2:07.72	
5	Ghania Rezzik	Algeria	2:08.51	
6	Haneen Yacoub	Palestine	2:26.67	
	Manal Bahraoui	Bahrain	DNS	

=== 1500 metres ===
4 July

Rank	Name	Nationality	Time	Notes
1st place, gold medalist(s)	Marta Hirpato	Bahrain	4:15.30	PB
2nd place, silver medalist(s)	Wafa Zaroual	Morocco	4:18.08	PB
3rd place, bronze medalist(s)	Ghania Rezzik	Algeria	4:20.33	
4	Abir Reffas	Algeria	4:21.70	
	Manal Bahraoui	Bahrain	DNF	
	Hanoia Hasaballa	Sudan	DNS	

=== 5000 metres ===
4 July

Rank	Name	Nationality	Time	Notes
1st place, gold medalist(s)	Bontu Edao Rebitu	Bahrain	15:02.22	PB
2nd place, silver medalist(s)	Soukaina Atanane	Morocco	15:34.53	
3rd place, bronze medalist(s)	Roselida Jepketer	Bahrain	15:44.68	
4	Hanane Qallouj	Morocco	16:05.24	PB
5	Nawal Yahi	Algeria	16:31.89	
	Fatiha Sanchez	Algeria	DNF	
	Hanoia Hasaballa	Sudan	DNS	

=== 10,000 metres ===
6 July

Rank	Name	Nationality	Time	Notes
1st place, gold medalist(s)	Bontu Edao Rebitu	Bahrain	31:40.02	PB
2nd place, silver medalist(s)	Soukaina Atanane	Morocco	32:37.42	PB
3rd place, bronze medalist(s)	Hanane Qallouj	Morocco	32:48.50	PB
4	Ruth Jebet	Bahrain	33:38.97	PB
5	Malika Ben Darbal	Algeria	34:28.95	
6	Hanoia Hasaballa	Sudan	37:15.10	
	Souad Aït Salem	Algeria	DNF	

=== 100 metres hurdles ===
5 July
Wind: ? m/s

Rank	Lane	Name	Nationality	Time	Notes
1st place, gold medalist(s)	5	Aminat Yusuf Jamal	Bahrain	13.56	PB
2nd place, silver medalist(s)	8	Rahil Hamel	Algeria	13.56	PB
3rd place, bronze medalist(s)	3	Noura Ennadi	Morocco	13.67	PB
4	7	Mazoon Al-Alawi	Oman	14.08	
5	9	Ghofrane Mohammad	Syria	14.11	
6	6	Manel Benkaci	Algeria	14.28	
7	2	Saleha Lahdan	Bahrain	15.59	
	4	Kurdistan Jamal	Iraq	DNF	

=== 400 metres hurdles ===
7 July

Rank	Lane	Name	Nationality	Time	Notes
1st place, gold medalist(s)	4	Kemi Adekoya	Bahrain	54.36	
2nd place, silver medalist(s)	8	Noura Ennadi	Morocco	55.40	
3rd place, bronze medalist(s)	3	Aminat Yusuf Jamal	Bahrain	55.51	
4	5	Loubna Benhadja	Algeria	57.90	
5	1	Ghofrane Mohammad	Syria	1:00.21	
6	2	Samira Messaad	Algeria	1:02.07	
7	7	Mahra Enqelya	United Arab Emirates	1:07.14	
	6	Kurdistan Jamal	Iraq	DNS	

=== 3000 metres steeplechase ===
6 July

Rank	Name	Nationality	Time	Notes
1st place, gold medalist(s)	Winfred Yavi	Bahrain	9:04.58	
2nd place, silver medalist(s)	Marwa Bouzayani	Tunisia	9:17.28	
3rd place, bronze medalist(s)	Ikram Ouaaziz	Morocco	9:43.57	
4	Tigist Mekonen	Bahrain	10:08.82	
5	Fatiha Sanchez	Algeria	10:12.92	
6	Nassima Smail	Algeria	10:28.42	

=== 4 × 100 metres relay ===
6 July

Rank	Lane	Nation	Athletes	Time	Notes
1st place, gold medalist(s)	3	Bahrain	Fatima Mubarak, Edidiong Odiong, Zenab Mahamat, Hajar Al-Khaldi	44.44	
2nd place, silver medalist(s)	5	Morocco	Imane Makrazi, Yousra Lajdoud, Salma Lehlali, Hajar Eddaou	46.26	
3rd place, bronze medalist(s)	4	Algeria	Loubna Benhadja, Manel Benkaci, Kaoutar Selmi, Rahil Hamel	46.86	

=== 4 × 400 metres relay ===
7 July

Rank	Lane	Nation	Athletes	Time	Notes
1st place, gold medalist(s)	5	Morocco	Sara El Hachimi, Assia Raziki, Noura Ennadi, Wafa Zaroual	3:35.80	
2nd place, silver medalist(s)	4	Bahrain	Kemi Adekoya, Awtif Ahmed, Aminat Yusuf Jamal, Zenab Mahamat	3:37.73	
3rd place, bronze medalist(s)	6	Algeria	Chaima Benali, Chaima Ouanis, Roukia Mouici, Djamila Zine	3:42.91	

=== 10 kilometres walk ===
4 July

Rank	Name	Nationality	Time	Notes
1st place, gold medalist(s)	Souad Azzi	Algeria	47:00	PB
2nd place, silver medalist(s)	Nesrine Mejri	Tunisia	47:13	PB
3rd place, bronze medalist(s)	Melissa Touloum	Algeria	47:38	

=== High jump ===
5 July

Rank	Name	Nationality	Result	Notes
1st place, gold medalist(s)	Darina Hadil Rezik	Algeria	1.77	
2nd place, silver medalist(s)	Ghizlane Siba	Morocco	1.75	
3rd place, bronze medalist(s)	Mariam Abdelhameed Abdulelah	Iraq	1.73	
4	Alya Al-Hammadi	United Arab Emirates	1.45	

=== Long jump ===
4 July

Rank	Name	Nationality	Result	Notes
1st place, gold medalist(s)	Esraa Owis	Egypt	6.54	
2nd place, silver medalist(s)	Yousra Lajdoud	Morocco	6.44	
3rd place, bronze medalist(s)	Fatima Moubarak	Bahrain	6.09	NR
4	Wessal Harqas	Algeria	5.75	PB
5	Kaoutar Selmi	Algeria	5.54	

=== Triple jump ===
7 July

Rank	Name	Nationality	Result	Notes
1st place, gold medalist(s)	Esraa Owis	Egypt	13.57	NR
2nd place, silver medalist(s)	Wessal Harqas	Algeria	12.86	
3rd place, bronze medalist(s)	Kaoutar Selmi	Algeria	12.63	

=== Shot put ===
7 July

Rank	Name	Nationality	Result	Notes
1st place, gold medalist(s)	Noora Salem Jassem	Bahrain	15.89	
2nd place, silver medalist(s)	Nada Cheroudi	Tunisia	13.96	
3rd place, bronze medalist(s)	Lyna Benaibouche	Algeria	13.64	
4	Zainab Zeroual	Morocco	12.78	
5	Fatima Youssef Al-Hosani	United Arab Emirates	11.92	

=== Discus throw ===
5 July

Rank	Name	Nationality	Result	Notes
1st place, gold medalist(s)	Nabila Bounab	Algeria	50.25	
2nd place, silver medalist(s)	Salem Rijaj Essayah	Libya	47.30	
3rd place, bronze medalist(s)	Fatima Youssef Al-Hosani	United Arab Emirates	43.53	
4	Noora Salem Jassem	Bahrain	40.98	

=== Hammer throw ===
6 July

Rank	Name	Nationality	Result	Notes
1st place, gold medalist(s)	Zahra Tatar	Algeria	69.48	NR
2nd place, silver medalist(s)	Zouina Bouzebra	Algeria	65.59	
3rd place, bronze medalist(s)	Sinda Garma	Tunisia	54.40	

=== Javelin throw ===
4 July

Rank	Name	Nationality	Result	Notes
1st place, gold medalist(s)	Widad Yesli	Algeria	47.18	PB
2nd place, silver medalist(s)	Farah Tlik	Tunisia	40.42	
3rd place, bronze medalist(s)	Nisreen Lachhab	Tunisia	40.07	

=== Heptathlon ===
4–5 July

The highest mark recorded in each event is highlighted in yellow

Rank	Athlete	Nationality	100m H	HJ	SP	200m	LJ	JT	800m	Points	Notes
1st place, gold medalist(s)	Afaf Benhadja	Algeria	14.33	1.76	10.44	25.30	5.63	36.07	2:21.42	5411	PB
2nd place, silver medalist(s)	Nada Cheroudi	Tunisia	14.59	1.55	13.41	26.25	5.83	41.16	2:27.76	5411	
3rd place, bronze medalist(s)	Widad Yesli	Algeria	17.42	1.58	12.18	28.84	4.45	43.54	2:52.75	4087	
4	Baneen Ahmed Abdul	Iraq	17.88	1.52	9.84	28.89	4.57	28.84	2:52.07	3569	
