= Hamza Dair =

Moroccan sprinter (born 2002)

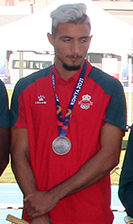
- Dair at the 2021 Islamic Solidarity Games

Personal information
- Native name: Arabic: حمزة الدائر
- Full name: Hamza Dair; Hamza Daier
- Nationality: Morocco
- Born: 1 October 2002 (23 years, 305 days old)

Sport
- Sport: Athletics
- Events: 400 metres 600 metres
- Club: RBA

Achievements and titles
- National finals: 2021 Moroccan U20s; • 200m, 1st (gold); • 400m, 1st (gold); 2022 Moroccan Champs; • 400m, 2nd (silver); 2023 Moroccan Champs; • 400m, 2nd (silver)
- Personal bests: 400m: 45.43 (2023) 600m: 1:16.24 (2023)
Medal record
Men's athletics
Representing Morocco
Arab U18 Championships
Silver medal – second place	2019 Radès	400 m
Mediterranean Games
Silver medal – second place	2022 Oran	400 m
Islamic Solidarity Games
Gold medal – first place	2022 Konya	4 × 400 m relay
Silver medal – second place	2022 Konya	4 × 400 m mixed
Arab Games
Silver medal – second place	2023 Oran	400 m
Silver medal – second place	2023 Oran	4 × 400 m relay
Francophone Games
Silver medal – second place	2023 Kinshasa	400 m
Gold medal – first place	2023 Kinshasa	4 × 400 m relay
Arab U23 Championships
Silver medal – second place	2023 Radès	400 m
Silver medal – second place	2023 Radès	4 × 400 m
- Updated on 15 January 2024

Hamza Dair (Arabic: حمزة الدائر; born 1 October 2002), also spelled Hamza Daier, is a Moroccan sprinter specializing in the 400 metres. He won gold medals at the 2021 Islamic Solidarity Games and 2023 Jeux de la Francophonie in the 4 × 400 m relay. He was also an individual silver medalist at the 2023 Arab Games and 2022 Mediterranean Games.

== Biography ==
Dair is from Rabat where he trains with the Rabat athletics club.

Dair began his career as an 800 metres runner, finishing second in the U18 race at the 2018 Rabat Diamond League and 8th in the national event at the 2019 edition in that event. He first gained international championship experience at the 2019 Arab U18 Championships, finishing second in the 400 m behind Mohamed Ali Gouaned to take the silver medal.

Dair's first senior international competition was at the 2022 Mediterranean Games, where he won the silver medal in the 400 m behind João Coelho. Later that year at the 2022 Islamic Solidarity Games, Dair won his first gold medal in the men's 4 × 400 m relay, anchoring the team following Saad Hinti, as well as a silver in the mixed relay. In the individual 400 m, he qualified for the finals and finished 5th.

Dair saw most of his international success in the 2023 season, starting at the 2023 Meeting Hauts-de-France Pas-de-Calais indoors. He finished 3rd in his heat and 5th overall in the 400 m, behind race winner Karsten Warholm. Outdoors at the 2023 Arab Games, Dair won silver medals in both the individual 400 m and the 4 × 400 m relay. Following that at the 2023 Francophone Games, Dair won another silver medal in the 400 m, and the gold medal in the 4 × 400 m relay.

== Statistics ==
=== Best performances ===
Event	Mark	Place	Competition	Venue	Date	Ref
400 metres	45.43	4th	Arab Athletics Championships	Marrakesh, Morocco	21 June 2023	
600 metres	1:16.24	4th	Meeting National de Toulon	Toulon, France	12 May 2023	
