= Mohammed Msaad =

Moroccan steeplechase runner (born 2004)

Personal information
- Nationality: Morocco
- Born: 4 March 2004 (22 years, 119 days old)

Sport
- Sport: Athletics
- Event(s): 3000 metres steeplechase 1500 metres

Achievements and titles
- Personal bests: 3000mSC: 8:16.18 NJR (2023) 1500m: 3:57.51 (2022)
Medal record
Men's athletics
Representing Morocco
Arab U23 Championships
Silver medal – second place	2023 Radès	3000 m s'chase
Arab Championships
Gold medal – first place	2023 Marrakesh	3000 m s'chase
- Updated on 15 January 2024

Mohammed Msaad (born 4 March 2004), also spelled Mohammed M Saad, Mohammed Mesaaed, or Mohammed Messaed, is a Moroccan steeplechase runner. He was the gold medallist in the 3000 metres steeplechase at the 2023 Arab Athletics Championships, and he has represented Morocco at the 2023 World Athletics Championships.

== Biography ==
After placing third at the 2021 Moroccan U18 Championships in the 2000 metres steeplechase, Msaad achieved his first international experience at the 2021 Arab U18 Athletics Championships, finishing 4th in the same event. He raced just twice in 2022, coming in 2nd place at the Meeting de Zone in Salé in his 3000 m steeplechase debut.

Msaad began 2023 with a 5th-place finish at the African U20 Championships, finishing as the first non-East African. He won his first international medal at the inaugural 2023 Arab U23 Athletics Championships, winning silver in the 3000 m steeplechase. Although he did not win the race, he was the first under-20 finisher and his time of 8:35.22 served as a world lead for U20 athletes.

He was able to further improve that time at the 2023 Meeting International Mohammed VI d'Athlétisme de Rabat, running 8:16.18 to place 8th in a national Moroccan under-20 record. He followed that up with his first international gold medal at the 2023 Arab Athletics Championships in his home country, taking the steeplechase title as reigning Olympic champion Soufiane El Bakkali did not compete.

Msaad's impressive 2023 Diamond League performances in Rabat and Stockholm secured him a berth at the 2023 World Athletics Championships, competing as one of four Moroccan steeplechase runners that the country was allotted due to having the reigning champion in El Bakkali. In his heat, Msaad finished 9th in 8:22.95 and did not advance to the finals.

== Statistics ==
=== Best performances ===
Event	Mark	Place	Competition	Venue	Date	Ref
3000 metres steeplechase	8:16.18 NU20R	8th	Meeting International Mohammed VI d'Athlétisme de Rabat	Rabat, Morocco	28 May 2023	
1500 metres	3:57.51	5th (Round B)	Test INA	Rabat, Morocco	27 April 2022	
