= Salim Keddar =

Algerian middle-distance runner

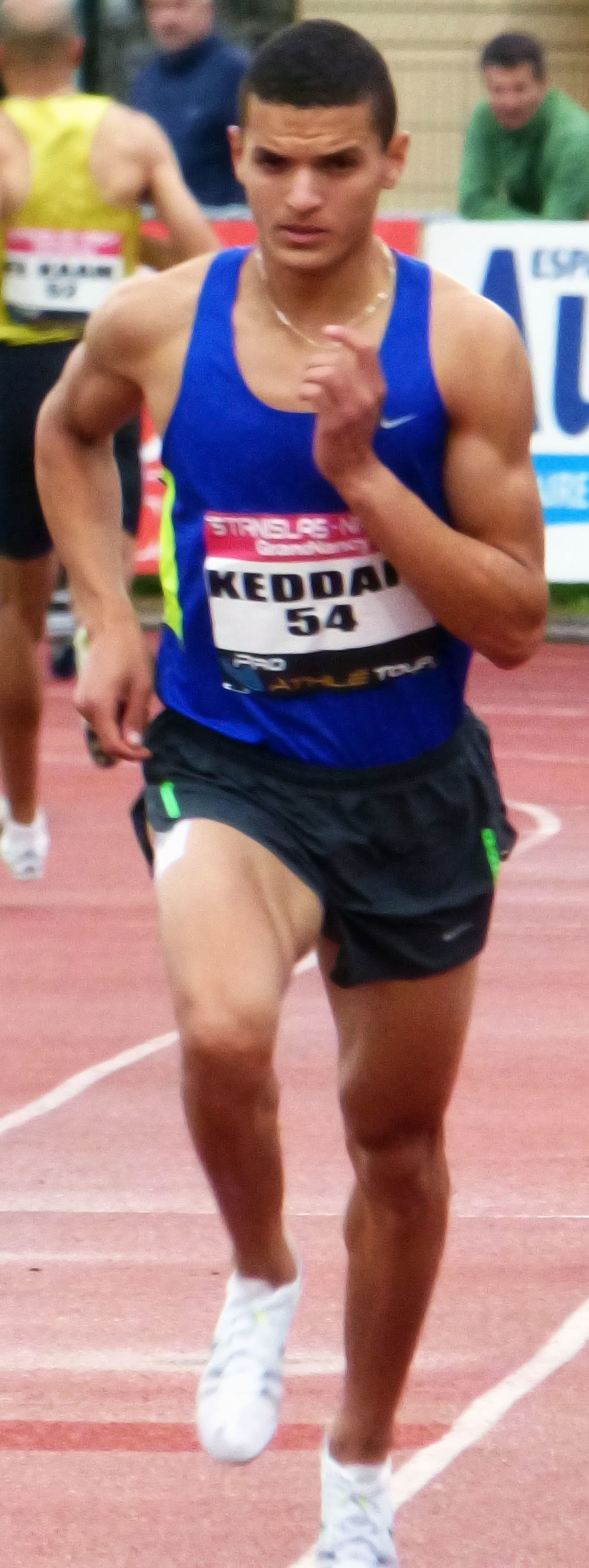

Personal information
- Born: 23 November 1993 (age 32)

Sport
- Country: Algeria
- Sport: Track and field
- Event: 1500 metres
Medal record
Representing Algeria
All-Africa Games
Bronze medal – third place	2015 Brazzaville	1500 m
- Updated on 29 August 2015

Salim Keddar (born 23 November 1993) is an Algerian middle-distance runner competing primarily in the 1500 metres. He represented his country at the 2015 World Championships in Beijing without advancing from the first round. In addition, he won the bronze medal at the 2015 African Games.

== Competition record ==
Year	Competition	Venue	Position	Event	Notes
Representing Algeria
2015	World Championships	Beijing, China	34th (h)	1500 m	3:44.81
2015	African Games	Brazzaville, Republic of the Congo	3rd	1500 m	3:46.31
2016	Olympic Games	Rio de Janeiro, Brazil	20th (h)	1500 m	3:40.63
2021	Arab Championships	Radès, Tunisia	4th	1500 m	3:37.46
2022	Mediterranean Games	Oran, Algeria	7th	1500 m	3:44.18
2022	Islamic Solidarity Games	Konya, Turkey	3rd	1500 m	3:54.72
2023	Arab Games	Oran, Algeria	4th	1500 m	3:38.47
2023	Arab Games	Oran, Algeria	3rd	5000 m	14:23.47
2023	World Championships	Budapest, Hungary	20th (h)	1500 m	3:35.17

== Personal bests ==
Outdoor

- 800 metres – 1:47.82 (Montgeron 2019)
- 1500 metres – 3:33.68 (Tomblaine 2023)
- 5000 metres – 13:18.54 (Montesson 2023)
- 3000 metres steeplechase – 8:39.32 (Algiers 2014)

Indoor

- 1500 metres – 3:38.56 (Val-de-Reuil 2023)
- 3000 metres – 7:45.94 (Liévin 2023)
