= Awwad Al-Sharafat =

Jordanian middle-distance runner

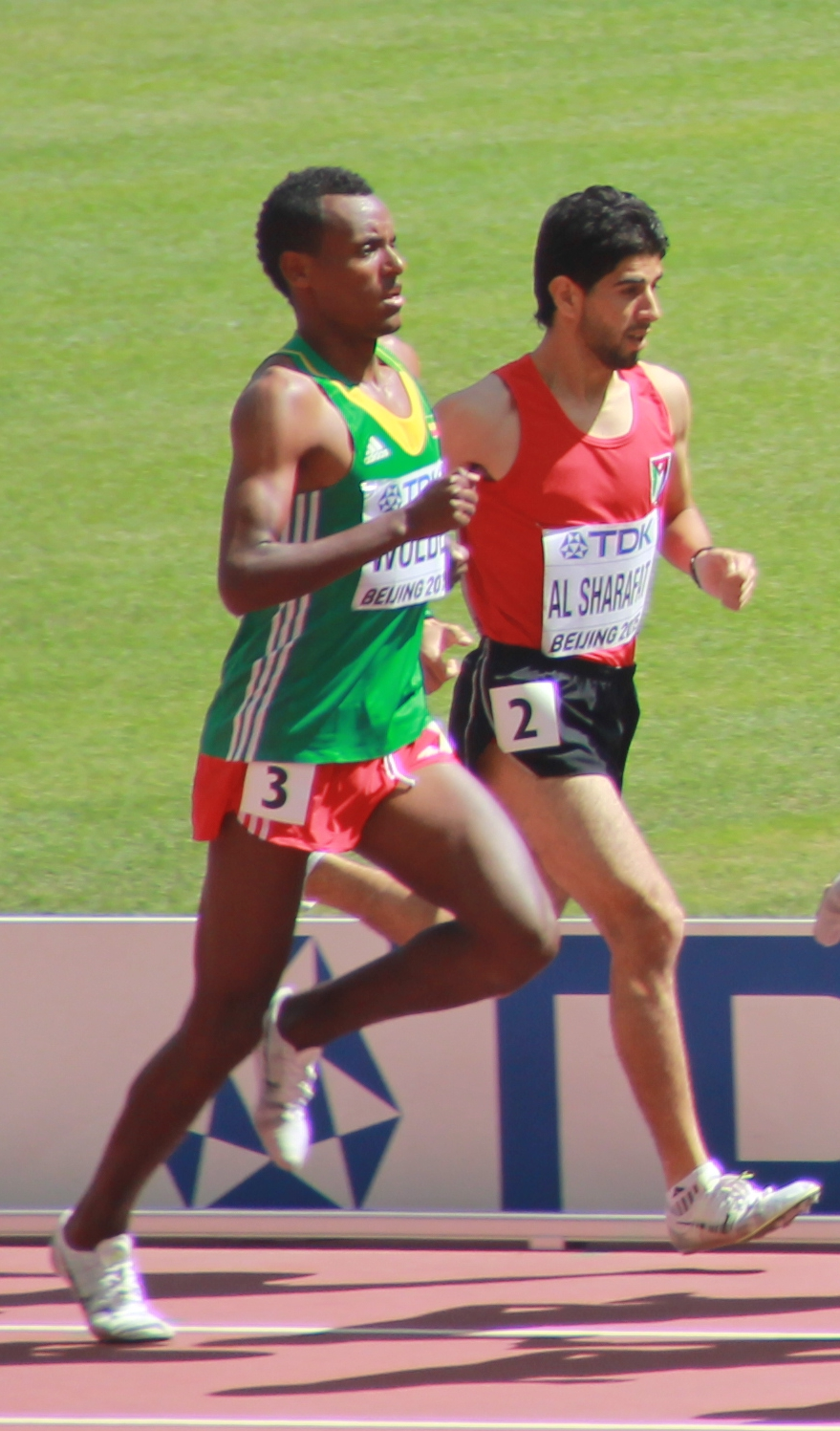
- Awwad Al-Sharafat (right) in 2015

Personal information
- Born: 25 December 1993 (age 32)
- Education: Hashemite University
- Height: 1.66 m (5 ft 5 in)
- Weight: 67 kg (148 lb)

Sport
- Country: Jordan
- Sport: Track and field
- Event(s): 1500 m, 5000 m
- Updated on 29 August 2015

Awwad Mohammad Al-Sharafat (Arabic: عواد الشرفات; born 25 December 1993) is a Jordanian middle-distance runner. He competed in the 1500 metres at the 2015 World Championships in Beijing without advancing from the first round.

His personal best in the 1500 metres is 3:57.71 set in Gwangju in 2015.

Al-Sharafat is from Al-Saada, Mafraq Governorate, and he began training in athletics around 2006. He was noticed at age 14 by former runner Khaled Al-Sharafat, and he won gold medals in regional district championships early on. His successes came despite only training three or four months per year, and he went on to win 63 medals and 11 cups in regional competitions. His performance at the 2015 Summer Universiade qualified him to represent Jordan at the 2015 World Championships in Athletics in China, though the short turnaround and a late injury due to running on asphalt hindered his performance there.

After the World Championships, Al-Sharafat built his own track on farmland in his hometown to avoid more training on asphalt, which worked until it was later plowed by the landowner.

He won the 10 km race at the 2016 Amman Marathon, which led to him being hosted by the Jordan Radio and Television Corporation show New Day (Arabic: برنامج يوم جديد). Despite his win, Al-Sharafat also announced his retirement that year, saying that he was not making enough money off the sport to continue and that transport from the desert in his home town was too difficult.

Al-Sharafat is coached by former Jordanian Athletics Championships winner Suleiman Al-Zaboun. He majored in physical education at Hashemite University.

Al-Sharafat later came out of retirement, qualifying in the 800 m and 1500 m at the 2023 Arab Games. He finished 10th in the 800 m and qualified for the 1500 m finals but did not finish in that event.

== Competition record ==
Year	Competition	Venue	Position	Event	Notes
Representing Jordan
2015	Universiade	Gwangju, South Korea	21st (h)	1500 m	3:57.71
2015	Universiade	Gwangju, South Korea	21st (h)	5000 m	15:03.52
2015	World Championships	Beijing, China	40th (h)	1500 m	4:07.72
2017	Asian Indoor and Martial Arts Games	Ashgabat, Turkmenistan	4th	1500 m	3:53.65
2018	West Asian Championships	Amman, Jordan	2nd	1500 m	3:55.73
2023	Arab Games	Oran, Algeria	10th	800 m	1:57.16
2023	Arab Games	Oran, Algeria	–	1500 m	DNF
