= 2023 Arab U23 Athletics Championships =

- Dates: 20–24 May
- Host city: Radès, Tunisia
- Venue: Hammadi Agrebi Stadium
- Events: 43

The 2023 Arab U23 Athletics Championships was the first edition of the international athletics competition for under-23 athletes from Arab countries. It took place from 20 to 24 May at the Hammadi Agrebi Stadium in Radès, Tunisia.

A total of 43 athletics events were contested. Morocco won the most medals at the championships.

== Medal summary ==
=== Men ===
Event	Gold		Silver		Bronze	
100m	Nasser Mahmoud Mohammed; Saudi Arabia	10.19	Ali Anwar Ali al-Balushi; Oman	10.48	Saif al Rammahi; Iraq	10.58
200m	Abdulaziz Abdui Atafi; Saudi Arabia	21.10	Ali Anwar Ali al-Balushi; Oman	21.35	Adem Abdelkader Benyache; Algeria	21.39
400m	Rami Balti; Tunisia	47.21	Hamza Dair; Morocco	47.24	Mouatez Abderrazek Sikiou; Algeria	47.55
800m	Mohamed Ali Gouaned; Algeria	1:47.16	Heithem Chenitef; Algeria	1:47.74	Ahmed Mohamed Abdillahi; Djibouti	1:48.00
1500m	Ayanleh Abdi Abdillahi; Djibouti	3:49.39	Yazid Dalla; Algeria	3:49.53	Oussema Alaoui; Morocco	3:50.17
5000m	Taha Er Raouy; Morocco	13:40.55	Said Ameri; Algeria	13:44.66	Mohammed Aataati; Morocco	13:47.84
10,000m	Taha Er Raouy; Morocco	30:41.37	Mohammed Aataati; Morocco	30:41.50	Said Ameri; Algeria	30:44.44
110mH	Youssef Badwy; Egypt	13.71	Bakr Ali Al-Jouma; Saudi Arabia	14.11	Ayoub Bensabra; Algeria	14.24
400mH	Saad Hinti; Morocco	50.12	Elmehdi Dimmokrati; Morocco	50.77	Mohamed Dahim Almouaoui; Saudi Arabia	51.29
3000mSC	Salaheddine Ben Yazide; Morocco	8:34.44	Mohammed Msaad; Morocco	8:35.22	Ebrahim Jridi; Tunisia	8:37.73
High Jump	Bilel Afer; Algeria	2.09 m	Abderrahmane Djaber; Algeria	2.06 m	Ahmed Abdullah Altarouti Alsafa; Saudi Arabia	2.03 m
Pole Vault	Seif Heneida; Qatar	5.30 m	Ameer Falih Abdulwahid; Iraq	4.90 m	Amir Subeih Seihoud; Iraq	4.85 m
Long Jump	Adem Boualbani; Algeria	7.36 m	Abdallah Jalel Kamar; Iraq	7.03 m	Yassin Esam Elsayed; Egypt	7.03 m
Triple Jump	Adem Boualbani; Algeria	16.50 m	Abdallah Jalel Kamar; Iraq	14.96 m	Yassin Esam Elsayed; Egypt	14.83 m
Shot Put	Abdelrahman Mahmoud; Bahrain	19.90 m	Ali Mustafa al Mubarak; Saudi Arabia	15.75 m		
Discus Throw	Gardam Abdelkader; Morocco	48.41 m	Ahmed Hamdi Mahmoud; Egypt	44.10 m		
Hammer Throw	Basel Mohamed Ahmed; Egypt	62.06 m	Mortadha Bousaien; Tunisia	60.57 m	Mubeen Rashid Ibrahim al Kindi; Oman	59.70 m
Javelin Throw	Mustafa Mahmoud Abdel Khaliq; Egypt	77.85 m	Ahmed Sameh Mohamed Hussein; Egypt	69.34 m	Abdulrahman al-Azemi; Kuwait	69.10 m
Decathlon	Badreddine Boudrah; Algeria	6098	Ahmed Mahmoud Taher; Egypt	6957		
10,000m Race Walk	Oussama Farhat; Tunisia	40:28.64	Aymen Bensaha; Algeria	41:39.22	Abdennour Ameur; Algeria	41:57.18
4x100m	Saudi Arabia U23; Saudi Arabia; Ali Abdullah al Tawfeeq; Saad Mohamed Al-Bakheet; Hassan Al-Absi; Abdulaziz Abdui Atafi	40.93	IRAQ U23; Iraq; Noureddine Adel Merzeh; Mohamed Najeh; Zinelabidin Ali Hamid; Saif al Rammahi	41.40		
4x400m	Algeria U23; Algeria; Mouatez Abderrazek Sikiou; Heithem Chenitef; Adem Abdelkader Benyache; Mohamed Ali Gouaned	3:07.46	Morocco U23; Morocco; Yassine Hssine; Elmehdi Dimmokrati; Saad Hinti; Hamza Dair	3:08.23	Qatar U23; Qatar; Hussein Ibrahim Issaka; Ammar Abid Abdelmajid; Abdul Majeed Mohamed Zakaria; Ashrat Hussen Osman	3:10.60

=== Women ===
Event	Gold		Silver		Bronze	
100m	Maram Mahmoud Ahmed; Egypt	11.97	Iman Mekrazi; Morocco	12.22	Mayssa Mouawad; Lebanon	12.27
200m	Salma Lehlali; Morocco	24.53	Iman Mekrazi; Morocco	24.81	Maram Mahmoud Ahmed; Egypt	24.83
400m	Salma Lehlali; Morocco	55.33	Malak Fartouni; Algeria	57.72	Ines Belkacem; Tunisia	59.60
800m	Sanae Hasnaoui; Morocco	2:17.19	Lamyae Himi; Morocco	2:17.68	Ghania Rezzik; Algeria	2:17.83
1500m	Rihab Dhahri; Tunisia	4:18.77	Meryeme Azrour; Morocco	4:20.23	Ghania Rezzik; Algeria	4:24.46
5000m	Khadija Ennasri; Morocco	16:44.96	Habon Ahmed; Djibouti	16:50.63	Aicha Allabbaa; Morocco	17:28.67
100mH	Malak Ayman Rashwan; Egypt	14.23	Kurdistan Jamal; Iraq	14.30	Dirin Khetiar Ali; Iraq	15.44
400mH	Razki Doha; Morocco	1:00.29	Nour Rahou; Algeria	1:02.06	Kurdistan Jamal; Iraq	1:04.86
3000mSC	Khadija Ennasri; Morocco	10:58.28	Rihab Dhahri; Tunisia	10:59.02	Nassima Smail; Algeria	11:09.15
High Jump	Darina Hadil Rezik; Algeria	1.74 m	Aiten Ahmed Yehia; Egypt	1.68 m	Assiya Elhafyan; Morocco	1.68 m
Pole Vault	Mariem Srasra; Tunisia	3.20 m	Sanar Ridha; Qatar	3.10 m	Zeina Yahia Ahmed Saad el-Din; Egypt	NM
Long Jump	Reem Abdelrazeq Abdelmoneam; Egypt	5.84 m	Wissal Harkas; Algeria	5.79 m	Aya el Aglaoui; Morocco	5.73 m
Triple Jump	Wissal Harkas; Algeria	13.14 m	Aya el Aglaoui; Morocco	12.51 m	Ghada Hamdani; Tunisia	12.50 m
Shot Put	Zineb Zaroual; Morocco	13.47 m	Chaima Chouikh; Tunisia	12.15 m	Echaabia Belmaachi; Morocco	11.85 m
Discus Throw	Echaabia Belmaachi; Morocco	46.24 m	Chaima Chouikh; Tunisia	44.79 m	Rana Khaled Mahmoud; Egypt	42.72 m
Hammer Throw	Rawan Barakat; Egypt	60.25 m	Senda Guerma; Tunisia	55.87 m	Nada Soliman Abdelnaby; Egypt	55.29 m
Javelin Throw	Nisreen Lachhab; Tunisia	40.41 m	Farah Tlik; Tunisia	39.12 m		
Heptathlon	Hania Abdallah; Algeria	4081	Mariem Asmaali; Tunisia	4171	Islam Kthiri; Tunisia	4367
10,000m Race Walk	Melissa Touloum; Algeria	49:00.73	Jamila Zegni; Tunisia	49:11.12	Oumayma Hsouna; Tunisia	50:12.35
4x100m	EGYPT U23; Egypt; Salma Abdulhamid Hamed; Malak Ayman Rashwan; Rim Abderrezk Abdelmoneim; Maram Mahmoud Ahmed	47.81	IRAQ U23; Iraq; Kurdistan Jamal; Dirin Khetiar Ali; Mamdouh Barae; Diyeh Nizar Rafik	48.33		
4x400m	Morocco U23; Morocco; Razki Doha; Sanae Hasnaoui; Iman Mekrazi; Salma Lehlali	3:45.94				

== Medal table ==
Rank	Nation	Gold	Silver	Bronze	Total
1	Morocco (MAR)	14	10	6	30
2	Egypt (EGY)	10	3	5	18
3	Algeria (ALG)	8	9	8	25
4	Tunisia (TUN)	5	8	5	18
5	Saudi Arabia (KSA)	3	2	2	7
6	Djibouti (DJI)	1	1	1	3
6	Qatar (QAT)	1	1	1	3
8	Bahrain (BHR)	1	0	0	1
9	Iraq (IRQ)	0	6	4	10
10	Oman (OMA)	0	2	1	3
11	Kuwait (KUW)	0	0	1	1
11	Lebanon (LBN)	0	0	1	1
Totals (12 entries)		43	42	35	120
