= 2024 Arab U23 Athletics Championships =

- Dates: 5–9 July
- Host city: Ismailia, Egypt
- Venue: Suez Canal Authority Stadium
- Events: 44
- Participation: 147 athletes from 12 nations

The 2024 Arab U23 Athletics Championships was the Second edition of the international athletics competition for under-23 athletes from Arab countries. It took place from 5 to 9 July at the Suez Canal Authority Stadium in Ismailia, Egypt.

It was the first time that Ismailia hosted the event. A total of 44 athletics events were contested. Morocco won the most medals at the championships.

== Medal summary ==
=== Men ===
Event	Gold		Silver		Bronze	
100m	Ali Anwar Ali AL Balushi; Oman	10.00 w	Nasser Mahmoud Mohammed; Saudi Arabia	10.23 w	Tamer Saleh; Lebanon	10.32 w
200m	Ali Anwar Ali AL Balushi; Oman	20.68 CR	Tamer Saleh; Lebanon	21.01	Yaqoub Mohamed Al Azemi; Kuwait	21.26
400m	Hamza Dair; Morocco	46.34 CR	Walid El Boussiri; Morocco	46.88	Marc Anthony Ibrahim; Lebanon	47.35
800m	Heithem Chenitef; Algeria	1:51.61	Abderrahman El Assal; Morocco	1:51.98	Husain Mohsin Al Farsi; Oman	1:52.34
1500m	Heithem Chenitef; Algeria	4:01.16	Zakaria Al Alhlami; Qatar	4:01.51	Osama Er Redouani; Morocco	4:03.16
5000m	Taha Er Raouy; Morocco	14:22.74	Mohamed Ait Taghzant; Morocco	14:46.86	Ahmed Kenawy Mohamed; Egypt	15:03.38
10000m	Taha Er Raouy; Morocco	29:28.02 CR	Mohamed Ait Taghzant; Morocco	29:43.96	Abbas Youssef Khamis Badawy; Egypt	32:40.70
110mH	Yadasef Badawy Said Hasanin; Egypt	13.80	Mohammed Hadi; Iraq	14.09	Abdallah Almaness; Kuwait	15.20
400mH	Marc Anthony Ibrahim; Lebanon	49.94 CR	Ahmed Gamal Gomaa; Iraq	51.42	Abbas Oudah Alkhawaf; Iraq	51.50
3000mSC	Salaheddine Ben Yazide; Morocco	8:47.21	Zakaria Al Alhlami; Qatar	8:49.81	Anes Djayahia; Algeria	8:52.52
High Jump	Youssef Mohamed Fawzy; Egypt	2.13 m CR	Abderrahmen Omar Sabar; Iraq	2.10 m	Amine Ouahioune; Algeria	2.05 m
Pole Vault	Belal Mohamed Ahmed Maher; Egypt	4.60 m	Farid Ahmed Tamer Mohamed; Egypt	4.60 m	Ali Ghassan Aaqassab; Saudi Arabia	4.50 m
Long Jump	Zayed Latif; Morocco	7.71 m CR	Zeyad Elhussein Elsayed Mohamed; Egypt	7.65 m	Abdullah Mohamed Al-Azmi; Kuwait	7.20 m
Triple Jump	Ahmed Ayoub Ben Naadja; Algeria	16.02 m	Seif El Din Mohamed Hassan; Egypt	15.17 m	Yahiya Nassir Maja’adal; Saudi Arabia	15.07 m
Shot Put	Husain Al Naser; Kuwait	17.39 m	Mohamed Adel Mezher; Iraq	16.42 m	Bader Naji; Saudi Arabia	15.96 m
Discus Throw	Abdullah Mohammad Al Zankawi; Kuwait	53.96 m CR	Ahmed Hamdi Mahmoud; Egypt	52.61 m	Bahbouh Mohamed Skander; Algeria	48.32 m
Hammer Throw	Mubeen Rashid Ibrahim Al Kindi; Oman	67.46 m CR	Basel Mohamed Ahmed; Egypt	65.63 m	Mohammed Alzayer; Saudi Arabia	62.82 m
Javelin Throw	Mohamed Osama Fathy Hassan; Egypt	64.66 m	Alaa El-Sayed Mohamed Taha; Egypt	60.22 m	Ali Hani Al Sakeeni; Saudi Arabia	44.03 m
10,000m Race Walk	Ismail Benhammouda; Algeria	40:57.67	Oussama Farhat; Tunisia	41:19.90	Rayen Cherni; Tunisia	41:56.04
Decathlon	Ahmed Mahmoud Taher; Egypt	7389 pts CR	Mohammed Rashid Al-Subaie; Saudi Arabia	6564 pts	Ahmed Mohamed Abulmagd; Egypt	6242 pts
Men's 4×100 Metres Relay	Saudi Arabia U23; Saudi Arabia	41.32	Egypt U23; Egypt	41.54	IRAQ U23; Iraq	42.47
Men's 4×400 Metres Relay	Morocco U23; Morocco	3:09.55	Saudi Arabia U23; Saudi Arabia	3:11.68	Qatar U23; Qatar	3:12.46

=== Women ===
Event	Gold		Silver		Bronze	
100m	Maram Mahmoud Ahmed; Egypt	11.58 w	Mayssa Mouawad; Lebanon	11.64 w	Haya Kobrosly; Lebanon	11.95 w
200m	Salma Lehlali; Morocco	23.87 CR	Mayssa Mouawad; Lebanon	24.07	Maram Mahmoud Ahmed; Egypt	24.10
400m	Salma Lehlali; Morocco	54.73 CR	Rasha Badrani; Lebanon	55.16	Malak Fartouni; Algeria	56.55
800m	Salma Elbadra; Morocco	2:14.82 CR	Saida El-Bouzy; Morocco	2:14.86	Ghania Rezzik; Algeria	2:16.39
1500m	Salma Elbadra; Morocco	4:30.71	Meryeme Azrour; Morocco	4:31.27	Ghania Rezzik; Algeria	4:32.11
5000m	Fatima Aafir; Morocco	16:35.20 CR	Aicha Allabba; Morocco	16:48.10	Habiba Mohsen Hamdi Hafez; Egypt	18:52.90
10000m	Fatima Aafir; Morocco	36:20.97	Aicha Allabba; Morocco	36:53.77	Jana Sharif Ibrahim Mohamed; Egypt	40:16.07
100mH	Rahil Hamel; Algeria	13.60	Malak Ayman Rashwan; Egypt	13.84	Nassima Belkhadar; Morocco	13.94
400mH	Rasha Badrani; Lebanon	59.60 CR	Mariem El Zahidi; Morocco	1:00.23	Malak Ahmed Fathy; Egypt	1:01.92
3000mSC	Khadija Ennasri; Morocco	10:36.50 CR	Dounia Souhail; Morocco	10:45.20	Malak Abdul-Ghani Abdullah Ibrahim; Egypt	11:06.20
High Jump	Safae Maskani; Morocco	1.77 m CR	Hana Hesham Raafat Masour Sakr; Egypt	1.71 m	Darina Hadil Rezik; Algeria	1.71 m
Pole Vault	Rasha Tamer Tawfik; Egypt	3.65 m CR	Reem Tamer Roshdy Sayed Ahmed; Egypt	3.60 m	Islem Lekthiri; Tunisia	1.90 m
Long Jump	Salma Abdulhamid Hamed; Egypt	6.20 m	Dounia Bamous; Morocco	5.72 m	Aya El Aglaoui; Morocco	5.60 m
Triple Jump	Dounia Bamous; Morocco	12.53 m	Salma Abdulhamid Hamed; Egypt	12.33 m	Yasmine Amin; Egypt	12.17 m
Shot Put	Lyna Benaibouche; Algeria	13.86 m CR	Basmala Magdi Zakareya Mohamed Shahin; Egypt	13.75 m	Ghofrane Hamdi; Tunisia	13.39 m
Discus Throw	Ghofrane Hamdi; Tunisia	52.38 m CR	Chaima CHOUIKH; Tunisia	51.41 m	Basant Tarek Abdul Rahman; Egypt	42.75 m
Hammer Throw	Sinda Garma; Tunisia	59.53 m	Nada Soliman Abdelnaby; Egypt	55.77 m	Shahd Walid mohamed Labib; Egypt	50.01 m
Javelin Throw	Shahinaz Sayed Faki; Egypt	41.50 m CR	Retaj Mohamed Helmy; Egypt	40.48 m	Wissem Souissi; Algeria	37.80 m
10,000m Race Walk	Manar Ismael Hazin Abdul Ghali; Egypt	48:58.80	Mona Ali Hussein Mohamed; Egypt	49:56.05	Melissa Touloum; Algeria	51:34.35
Women's Heptathlon	Malak Ayman Rashwan; Egypt	5008 pts	Islem Lekthiri; Tunisia	4652 pts	Nassima Belkhdar; Morocco	4415 pts
Women's 4×100 Metres Relay	Egypt U23; Egypt	46.21	Lebanon U23; Lebanon	46.91 NR	Morocco U23; Morocco	47.31
Women's 4×100 Metres Relay	Morocco U23; Morocco	3:46.21	Egypt U23; Egypt	3:50.89		

== Medal table ==
Host nation

Rank	Nation	Gold	Silver	Bronze	Total
1	Morocco (MAR)	16	11	5	32
2	Egypt (EGY)*	12	16	11	39
3	Algeria (ALG)	6	0	9	15
4	Oman (OMA)	3	0	1	4
5	Lebanon (LBN)	2	5	3	10
6	Tunisia (TUN)	2	3	3	8
7	Kuwait (KUW)	2	0	3	5
8	Saudi Arabia (KSA)	1	3	5	9
9	Iraq (IRQ)	0	4	2	6
10	Qatar (QAT)	0	2	1	3
11	Syria (SYR)	0	0	0	0
11	Yemen (YEM)	0	0	0	0
Totals (12 entries)		44	44	43	131
