= 2021 World Athletics U20 Championships – Men's 800 metres =

Event at 2021 World Athletics U20's

Men's 800 metres at the 2021 World Athletics U20 Championships
- Venue: Kasarani Stadium
- Dates: 19 August (heats); 21 August (semifinals); 22 August (final)
- Competitors: 30 from 24 nations
- Winning time: 1:43.76

Medalists
gold medal	Emmanuel Wanyonyi	Kenya
silver medal	Mohamed Ali Gouaned	Algeria
bronze medal	Noah Kibet	Kenya

The men's 800 metres at the 2021 World Athletics U20 Championships was held at the Kasarani Stadium on 19, 21 and 22 August.

== Records ==
Standing records prior to the 2021 World Athletics U20 Championships
World U20 Record	Nijel Amos (BOT)	1:41.73	London, United Kingdom	9 August 2012
Championship Record	Nijel Amos (BOT)	1:43.79	Barcelona, Spain	15 July 2012
World U20 Leading	Max Burgin (GBR)	1:44.14	Ostrava, Czech Republic	19 May 2021

== Results ==
=== Heats ===
Qualification: First 3 of each heat (Q) and the 4 fastest times (q) qualified for the semifinals.

Rank	Heat	Name	Nationality	Time	Note
1	3	Emmanuel Wanyonyi	Kenya	1:46.51	Q
2	1	Noah Kibet	Kenya	1:46.70	Q
3	3	Yanis Meziane	France	1:47.28	Q, PB
4	1	Jakub Davidík	Czech Republic	1:47.84	Q
5	4	Mohamed Ali Gouaned	Algeria	1:48.83	Q
6	2	Kacper Lewalski	Poland	1:48.84	Q
7	2	Abdullahi Hassan	Canada	1:49.09	Q
8	1	Heithem Chenitef	Algeria	1:49.19	Q, PB
9	3	Daniel Wolde	Ethiopia	1:49.20	Q
10	3	Handal Roban	Saint Vincent and the Grenadines	1:49.41	q, NU20R
11	2	Chevonne Hall	Jamaica	1:49.47	Q
12	2	Abdullah Al-Yaari	Yemen	1:49.65	q
13	2	El Hafez Mahadi	Qatar	1:49.68	q
14	4	Leonardo Santos	Brazil	1:49.76	Q
15	3	Abednico Choba	South Africa	1:50.20	q
16	4	Paul Anselmini	France	1:50.23	Q
17	1	Anu Kumar	India	1:50.26	
18	2	Husain Mohsin Al-Farsi	Oman	1:50.34	PB
19	1	David Garcia	Portugal	1:50.92	
20	4	Nikita Yegorov	Authorised Neutral Athletes	1:51.80	
21	4	Matthew Erickson	Canada	1:52.38	
22	1	Fithawi Zaid	Eritrea	1:52.46	
23	4	Remmy Ng'andu	Zambia	1:52.48	
24	2	Masresha Costa	Italy	1:52.71	
25	3	Mark Fandly	Romania	1:52.81	
26	4	Francesco Pernici	Italy	1:53.35	
27	3	Osaze Demund	United States Virgin Islands	1:58.50	PB
28	4	Mohamed Mustafa	Sudan	1:59.55	PB
29	3	Aleksa Tomić	Serbia	2:06.05	
	1	Ermias Girma	Ethiopia	DQ	TR17.3.1

=== Semifinals ===
Qualification: First 3 of each heat (Q) and the 2 fastest times (q) qualified for the final.

Rank	Heat	Name	Nationality	Time	Note
1	1	Emmanuel Wanyonyi	Kenya	1:46.15	Q
2	2	Noah Kibet	Kenya	1:46.47	Q
3	2	Jakub Davidík	Czech Republic	1:46.59	Q, NU20R
4	2	Abdullahi Hassan	Canada	1:46.89	Q
5	2	Kacper Lewalski	Poland	1:47.31	q
6	1	Mohamed Ali Gouaned	Algeria	1:47.35	Q
7	1	Daniel Wolde	Ethiopia	1:47.53	Q
8	1	Paul Anselmini	France	1:47.81	q, PB
9	2	Abednico Choba	South Africa	1:48.23	PB
10	1	Handal Roban	Saint Vincent and the Grenadines	1:48.37	NU20R
11	2	Chevonne Hall	Jamaica	1:48.50	PB
12	1	Leonardo Santos	Brazil	1:48.78	
13	2	Heithem Chenitef	Algeria	1:49.57	
14	1	El Hafez Mahadi	Qatar	1:49.84	
15	1	Abdullah Al-Yaari	Yemen	1:53.24	
	2	Yanis Meziane	France	DNF	

=== Final ===
The final was held on 22 August at 15:31.

Rank	Lane	Name	Nationality	Time	Note
1st place, gold medalist(s)	3	Emmanuel Wanyonyi	Kenya	1:43.76	CR, WU20L
2nd place, silver medalist(s)	6	Mohamed Ali Gouaned	Algeria	1:44.45	NU20R
3rd place, bronze medalist(s)	5	Noah Kibet	Kenya	1:44.88	PB
4	7	Jakub Davidík	Czech Republic	1:46.07	NU20R
5	2	Daniel Wolde	Ethiopia	1:48.62	
6	8	Kacper Lewalski	Poland	1:49.40	
7	4	Abdullahi Hassan	Canada	1:50.07	
8	1	Paul Anselmini	France	1:53.70	
