= Salma Elbadra =

Moroccan middle-distance runner

Personal information
- Nationality: Moroccan
- Born: 12 September 2004 (age 22)

Sport
- Sport: Athletics
- Events: Middle-distance running, Cross country running

Achievements and titles
- Personal bests: 800m: 2:01.76 (Jacksonville, 2025); 1500m: 4:02.63 (Salem, 2026); Mile: 4:27.54 (Boston, 2026); 3000m: 8:41.76 (Boston, 2025); 5000m: 15:51.24 (Lexington, 2025)
Medal record
Women's athletics
Representing Morocco
Arab U23 Championships
Gold medal – first place	2024 Ismailia	800 m
Gold medal – first place	2024 Ismailia	1500 m

Salma Elbadra (born 12 September 2004) is a Moroccan middle-distance and cross country runner.

== Biography ==
In May 2023, Eldara won the women's U23 1500 metres race at the 2023 Meeting International Mohammed VI d'Athlétisme de Rabat in Rabat.

Elbadra competed as a freshman at the University of Wyoming in 2024. Elbadra qualified for the 2024 NCAA Track and Field National Championships in the 1500 metres, running a time of 4:15.80 in the West Regionals finals in May 2024, before running 4:15.24 in the NCAA semi-final in Eugene, Oregon in June. In doing so, she was the sole female athlete to represent Wyoming at the championship. Competing over 800 metres on 8 July 2024, she ran 2:14.82 to win the 2024 Arab U23 Athletics Championships in Ismailia, Egypt, setting a new championship record time whilst representing Morocco.

Having transferred to the University of South Carolina, she won the NCAA Southeast Cross Country Regional over 6 km in November 2025. In December 2025, she won the 3000 metres indoors in Boston, Massachusetts in 8:41.76 ahead of Vera Sjoberg at the Boston University's Sharon Colyear-Danville Season Opener.

Alongside Anass Essayi and Fouad Messaoudi, she was selected for the 2026 World Athletics Cross Country Championships in Tallahassee, Florida. In February 2026, she won the mile run title, running a time of 4:30.72 at the SEC Indoor Championships. That month, she ran an indoor personal best and Moroccan indoor national record for the mile of 4:27.54 at the Boston University David Hemery Valentine Invitational.

On 14 March 2026, she placed seventh at the 2026 NCAA Indoor Championships in the 3000 metres, running 8:49.49. In May, she won the women's 1500 m in 4:09.80 at the SEC Championships, before running 4:10.62 at the NCAA East Regionals. On 13 June, Elbadra ran 4:12.89 to finish second in the 1500 meters at the 2026 NCAA Outdoor Championships.

In November 2026, she placed second to Hannah Gapes in the individual women's race at the 2026 NCAA Cross Country Championships in Indiana.
