= Athletics at the 2023 Arab Games =

Athletics at the XIII Arab Games
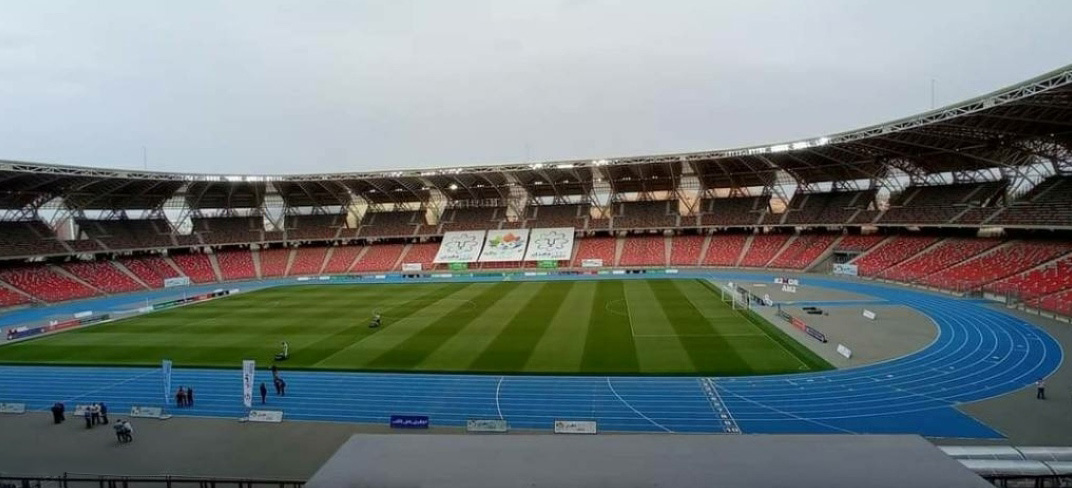
- Dates: 4 – 7 July
- Host city: Bir El Djir, Oran, Algeria
- Venue: Miloud Hadefi Stadium
- Events: 43
- Participation: 218 athletes from 19 nations

Athletics at the 2023 Arab Games in Algeria were held between 4 to 7 July 2023, featuring a total of 43 medal events: 22 men's events and 21 women's. All events were contested at Miloud Hadefi Stadium in Oran.

== Medal summary ==
=== Men ===
Event	Gold		Silver		Bronze	
100 metres	Saeed Alkhaldi (BHR)	10.22	Chakir Machmour (MAR)	10.24	Barakat Al-Harthi (OMA)	10.37
200 metres	Chakir Machmour (MAR)	20.73	Mohamed Obaid Al-Saadi (OMA)	20.94	Taha Hussein Yaseen (IRQ)	20.99
400 metres	Ashraf Osman (QAT)	45.26	Hamza Dair (MAR)	45.81	Musa Isah (BHR)	45.85
800 metres	Slimane Moula (ALG)	1:46.87	Essa Ali Kzwani (KSA)	1:47.71	Abdessalem Ayouni (TUN)	1:48.19
1500 metres	Abdellatif Sadiki (MAR)	3:37.61	Fouad Messaoudi (MAR)	3:37.99	Zouhair Aouad (BHR)	3:38.17
5000 metres	Birhanu Balew (BHR)	14:21.89	Hafid Rizqy (MAR)	14:23.32	Salim Keddar (ALG)	14:23.47
10,000 metres	Dawit Admasu (BHR)	29:08.80	Mohcin Outalha (MAR)	29:17.40	Youcef Addouche (ALG)	29:21.90
110 metres hurdles	Amine Bouanani (ALG)	13.58	Yaqoub Alyouha (KUW)	13.67	Oumar Abakar (QAT)	14.20
400 metres hurdles	Bassem Hemeida (QAT)	49.17	Abdelmalik Lahoulou (ALG)	49.47	Saber Boukemouche (ALG)	50.10
3000 metres steeplechase	Hichem Bouchicha (ALG)	8:24.04	Bilal Tabti (ALG)	8:25.32	Salah Eddine Ben Yazide (MAR)	8:28.59
4×100 metres relay	Oman (OMA); Rashid Al-Aasmi; Barakat Al-Harthi; Mohamed Obaid Al-Saadi; Ali Anwar Ali Al-Balushi	39.70	Bahrain (BHR); Omar Ebrahim; Yaqoob Salem Yaqoob; Husain Al-Doseri; Saeed Al-Khaldi	40.19	Algeria (ALG); Hakim Guettouche; Adem Abdelkader Benyache; Idriss Lardj; Djamil Skandar Athmani	40.35
4×400 metres relay	Algeria (ALG); Fouad Hamada; Mohamed Ali Gouaned; Djamel Sedjati; Slimane Moula	3:02.84	Morocco (MAR); Nadir El Haddaoui; Rachid Mhamdi; El Mehdi Dimokrati; Hamza Dair	3:04.94	Iraq (IRQ); Yasir Ali Al-Saadi; Mohamed Al-Baqer; Mohammed Abdulridha Al-Tameemi; Taha Hussein Yaseen	3:06.37
20 km walk	Shail Abderahmane Aloui (ALG)	1:31.56	Abdenour Ameur (ALG)	1:36.17	Alnuami Alshaali (UAE)	1:43.31
High jump	Fatak Abdul Ghafoor Sanjoor Bait Jaboob (OMA)	2.16 m NR	Hamdi Ali (QAT)	2.16 m	Hichem Bouhanoune (ALG)	2.13 m
Pole vault	Seifeldin Abdelsalam (QAT)	5.51 m NR	Mehdi Jacques Amar-Rouana (ALG)	5.30 m	Ameer Falih Abdulwahid (IRQ)	5.00 m
Long jump	Yasser Triki (ALG)	7.83 m	Zaïd Latif (MAR)	7.60 m	Salim Salem Muslem Al Yarabi (OMA)	7.55 m
Triple jump	Yasser Triki (ALG)	17.30 m	Adem Boualbani (ALG)	16.35 m	Salim Salem Muslem Al Yarabi (OMA)	15.41 m
Shot put	Mostafa Hassan (EGY)	20.52 m	Abdelrahman Mahmoud (BHR)	19.17 m	Musab Ibrahim Mohammad Momani (JOR)	17.18 m
Discus throw	Moaaz Ibrahim (QAT)	62.48 m	Eissa Zankawi (KUW)	61.48 m	Oussama Khennoussi (ALG)	58.25 m
Hammer throw	Mostafa El Gamel (EGY)	76.48 m	Ahmed Amgad El Seify (QAT)	69.61 m	Mohsen Mohamed Anani (TUN)	67.69 m
Javelin throw	Ihab Abdelrahman El Sayed (EGY)	80.50 m	Ali Essa Al Abdulghani (KSA)	73.54 m	Abdulrahman Al Azmi (KUW)	70.83 m
Decathlon	Larbi Bourrada (ALG)	7362 pts	Dhiae Cherif Boudoumi (ALG)	7019 pts	Abd Alsajjad Alsubihawi (IRQ)	6958 pts

=== Women ===
Event	Gold		Silver		Bronze	
100 metres	Edidiong Odiong (BHR)	11.27	Hajar Al-Khaldi (BHR)	11.35	Mudhawi Alshammari (KUW)	11.56
200 metres	Hajar Al-Khaldi (BHR)	23.30	Edidiong Odiong (BHR)	23.74	Sara El Hachimi (MAR)	23.89
400 metres	Oluwakemi Adekoya (BHR)	51.02	Salma Lehlali (MAR)	52.98	Sara El Hachimi (MAR)	53.38
800 metres	Assia Raziki (MAR)	2:05.17	Marta Yota (BHR)	2:05.47	Wafa Zaroual (MAR)	2:07.29
1500 metres	Marta Yota (BHR)	4:15.30	Wafa Zaroual (MAR)	4:18.08	Ghania Rezzik (ALG)	4:20.33
5000 metres	Bontu Rebitu (BHR)	15:02.22	Soukaina Atanane (MAR)	15:34.53	Roselidah Domongole (BHR)	15:44.68
10,000 metres	Bontu Rebitu (BHR)	31:40.02	Soukaina Atanane (MAR)	32:37.42	Hanane Qallouj (MAR)	32:48.50
100 metres hurdles	Aminat Yusuf Jamal (BHR)	13.56	Rahil Hamel (ALG)	13.56	Noura Ennadi (MAR)	13.67
400 metres hurdles	Oluwakemi Adekoya (BHR)	54.36	Noura Ennadi (MAR)	55.40	Aminat Yusuf Jamal (BHR)	55.51
3000 metres steeplechase	Winfred Yavi (BHR)	9:04.58	Marwa Bouzayani (TUN)	9:17.28	Ikram Ouaaziz (MAR)	9:43.57
4×100 metres relay	Bahrain (BHR); Fatima Mubarak; Edidiong Odiong; Zenab Mahamat; Hajar Al-Khaldi	44.44	Morocco (MAR); Imane Makrazi; Yousra Lajdoud; Salma Lehlali; Hajar Eddaou	46.26	Algeria (ALG); Loubna Benhadja; Manel Benkaci; Kaoutar Selmi; Rahil Hamel	46.86
4×400 metres relay	Morocco (MAR); Sara El Hachimi; Noura Ennadi; Assia Raziki; Wafa Zaroual	3:35.80	Bahrain (BHR); Oluwakemi Adekoya; Awtif Ahmed; Aminat Yusuf Jamal; Zenab Mahamat	3:37.73	Algeria (ALG); Chaima Benali; Chaima Ouanis; Roukia Mouici; Djamila Zine	3:42.91
10 km walk	Souad Azzi (ALG)	47:00	Syrine El Mejri (TUN)	47:13	Millissa Touloum (ALG)	47:38
High jump	Darina Hadil Rezik (ALG)	1.77 m	Rhizlane Siba (MAR)	1.75 m	Maryam Abdulelah (IRQ)	1.73 m
Long jump	Esraa Owis (EGY)	6.54 m	Yousra Lajdoud (MAR)	6.44 m	Fatima Mubarak (BHR)	6.09 m NR
Triple jump	Esraa Owis (EGY)	13.57 m NR	Wissal Harkas (ALG)	12.86 m	Kaoutar Selmi (ALG)	12.63 m
Shot put	Noora Salem Jasim (BHR)	15.89 m	Nada Charoudi (TUN)	13.96 m	Lyna Benaibouche (ALG)	13.64 m
Discus throw	Nabila Bounab (ALG)	50.25 m	Retag Asaiah (LBA)	47.30 m	Fatima Alhosani (UAE)	43.53 m
Hammer throw	Zahra Tatar (ALG)	69.48 m NR	Zouina Bouzebra (ALG)	65.59 m	Senda Garma (TUN)	54.40 m
Javelin throw	Ouidad Yesli (ALG)	47.18 m	Farah Tlig (TUN)	40.42 m	Nesrine Lachheb (TUN)	40.07 m
Heptathlon	Afaf Benhadja (ALG)	5411 pts	Nada Charoudi (TUN)	5342 pts	Ouidad Yesli (ALG)	4087 pts

== Medal table ==
* Host nation (Algeria)

2023 Athletics Arab Games medal table
Rank	NOC	Gold	Silver	Bronze	Total
1	Algeria (ALG)*	14	8	13	35
2	Bahrain (BHR)	14	6	5	25
3	Egypt (EGY)	5	0	0	5
4	Morocco (MAR)	4	15	7	26
5	Qatar (QAT)	4	2	1	7
6	Oman (OMA)	2	1	3	6
7	Tunisia (TUN)	0	5	4	9
8	Kuwait (KUW)	0	2	2	4
9	Saudi Arabia (KSA)	0	2	0	2
10	Iraq (IRQ)	0	1	5	6
11	Libya (LBA)	0	1	0	1
12	United Arab Emirates (UAE)	0	0	2	2
13	Jordan (JOR)	0	0	1	1
Totals (13 entries)		43	43	43	129

== Participating nations ==
- Algeria (65)
- Bahrain (32)
- Egypt (4)
- Iraq (14)
- Jordan (5)
- Kuwait (5)
- Libya (2)
- Mauritania (2)
- Morocco (27)
- Oman (9)
- Palestine (3)
- Qatar (7)
- Saudi Arabia (13)
- Somalia (1)
- Sudan (4)
- Syria (1)
- Tunisia (12)
- United Arab Emirates (10)
- Yemen (2)

== See also ==
- 2023 Arab Athletics Championships
