= Noah Kibet =

Kenyan middle-distance runner

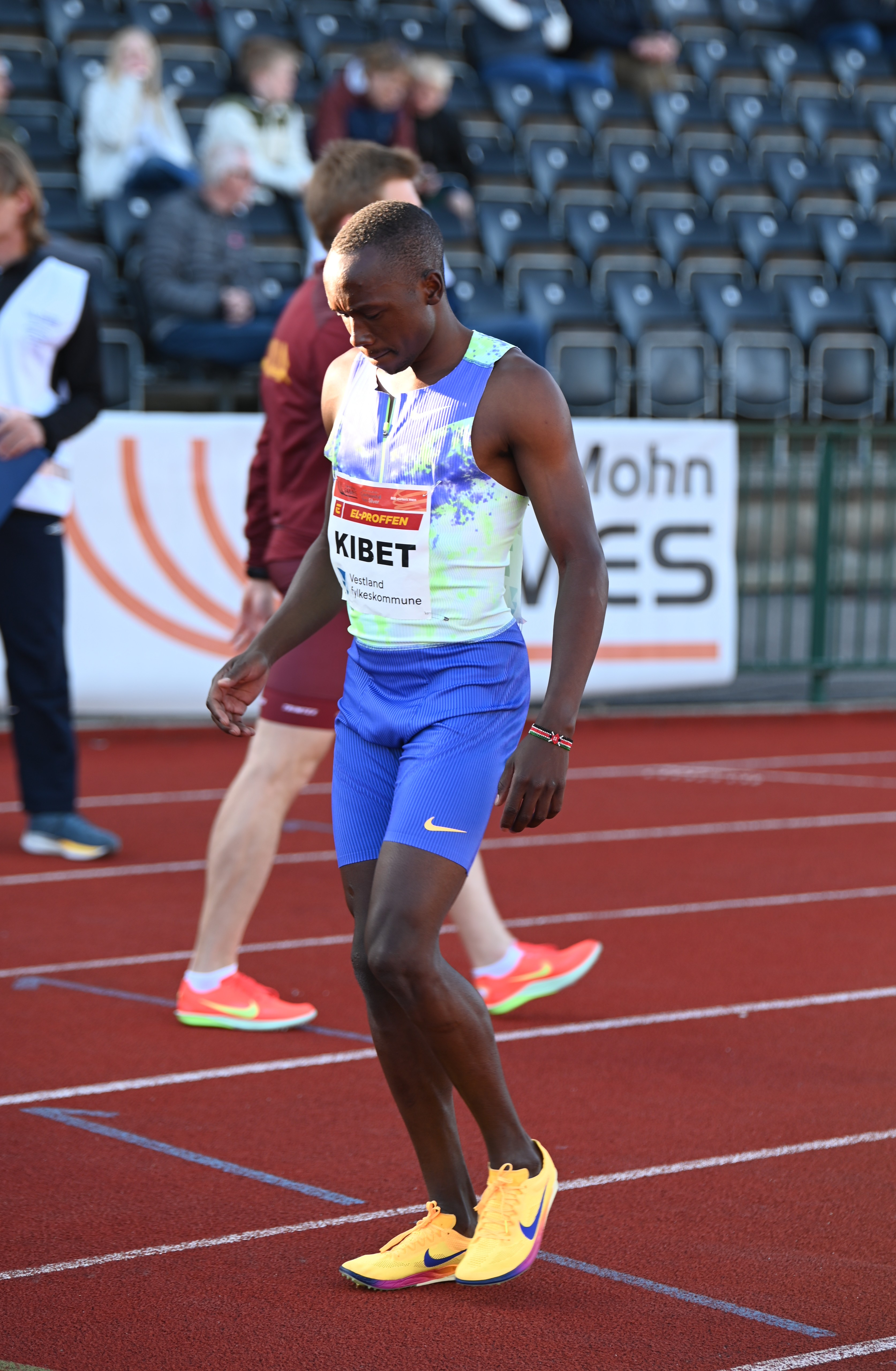
- Noah Kibet in 2026

Personal information
- Nationality: Kenyan
- Born: 12 April 2004 (age 22)

Sport
- Country: Kenya
- Sport: Track and field
- Event: 800 metres

Achievements and titles
- Personal bests: Outdoor; 800 m: 1:44.88 (Nairobi 2021); Indoor; 800 m: 1:46.06 (Metz 2022)
Medal record
Men's athletics
Representing Kenya
World Indoor Championships
Silver medal – second place	2022 Belgrade	800 m
World U20 Championships
Bronze medal – third place	2021 Nairob	800 m

Noah Kibet (born 12 April 2004) is a Kenyan middle-distance runner. He won the silver medal in the men's 800 metres event at the 2022 World Athletics Indoor Championships held in Belgrade, Serbia.

On 11 February 2024, Kibet came in 2nd place to Bryce Hoppel in the Millrose Games Men's 800m, in a time of 1:46.09.

== International competitions ==
Representing Kenya
Year	Competition	Venue	Position	Event	Notes
2021	World U20 Championships	Nairobi, Kenya	3rd	800 m	1:44.88
2022	World Indoor Championships	Belgrade, Serbia	2nd	800 m i	1:46.35
2022	World Championships	Eugene, United States	22nd (sf)	800 m	1:47.15
2024	World Indoor Championships	Glasgow, United Kingdom	14th (h)	800 m i	1:46.90
2026	World Indoor Championships	Toruń, Poland	5th (sf)	800 m i	1:45.73
