= Hicham Bouchicha =

Algerian athlete (born 1989)

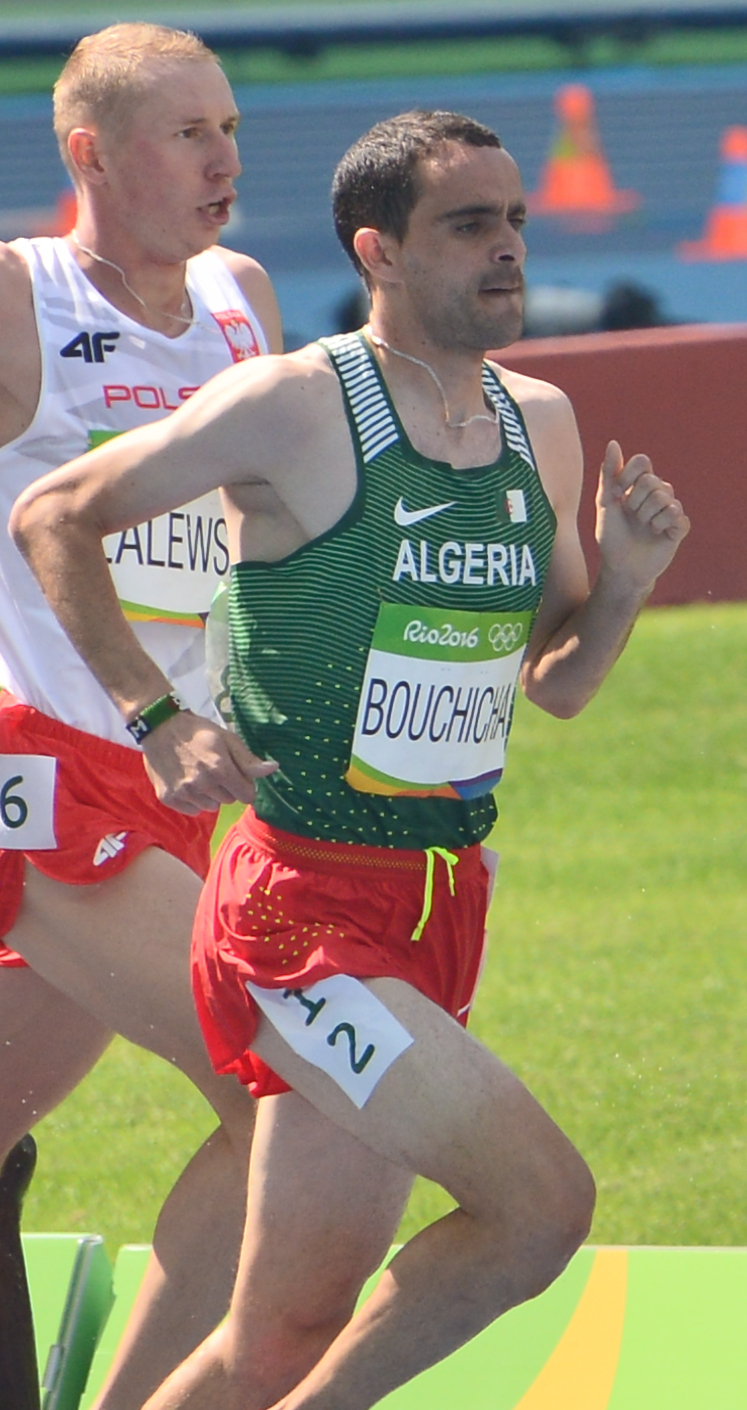
- Bouchicha at the 2016 Olympics

Personal information
- Nationality: Algerian
- Born: 19 May 1989 (age 37)
- Education: INFS STS Sports University
- Height: 1.82 m (6 ft 0 in)
- Weight: 64 kg (141 lb)

Sport
- Country: Algeria
- Sport: Track and field
- Event: 3000 metres steeplechase

Achievements and titles
- Personal best: 8:15.88 (2021)

Hicham Bouchicha (born 19 May 1989) is an Algerian athlete specialising in the 3000 metres steeplechase. He represented his country at the 2013 and 2015 World Championships reaching the final on the second occasion.

== Competition record ==
Year	Competition	Venue	Position	Event	Notes
Representing Algeria
2013	Mediterranean Games	Mersin, Turkey	7th	3000 m s'chase	8:33.38
2013	World Championships	Moscow, Russia	20th (h)	3000 m s'chase	8:28.56
2013	Islamic Solidarity Games	Palembang, Indonesia	5th	3000 m s'chase	8:48:71
2015	World Championships	Beijing, China	14th	3000 m s'chase	8:33.79
2015	African Games	Brazzaville, Republic of the Congo	9th	3000 m s'chase	8:38.92
2016	Olympic Games	Rio de Janeiro, Brazil	24th (h)	3000 m s'chase	8:33.61
2017	World Championships	London, United Kingdom	20th (h)	3000 m s'chase	8:30.01
2018	Mediterranean Games	Tarragona, Spain	7th	3000 m s'chase	8:40.43
2021	Arab Championships	Radès, Tunisia	2nd	3000 m s'chase	8:33.21
2021	Olympic Games	Tokyo, Japan	41st (h)	3000 m s'chase	8:44.75
2022	Mediterranean Games	Oran, Algeria	3rd	3000 m s'chase	8:23.95
2022	World Championships	Eugene, United States	25th (h)	3000 m s'chase	8:27.39
2023	Arab Games	Oran, Algeria	1st	3000 m s'chase	8:24.04
2025	Arab Championships	Oran, Algeria	2nd	3000 m s'chase	8:28.05
