= Fouad Messaoudi =

Moroccan middle-distance runner

Personal information
- Nationality: Moroccan
- Born: 7 January 2001 (age 25)

Sport
- Sport: Athletics
- Events: Middle-distance running, Cross country running

Achievements and titles
- Personal bests: 800m: 1:48.76 (2024); 1500m: 3:32.11 (2026); Mile: 3:52.66 (2025); 3000m: 7:40.20 (2026); 5000m: 13:25.48 (2025)
Medal record
Men's athletics
Representing Morocco
Mediterranean Games
Bronze medal – third place	2026 Taranto	5000 m
Arab Championships
Silver medal – second place	2023 Algiers	1500 m

Fouad Messaoudi (born 7 January 2001) is a Moroccan middle-distance and cross country runner. He represented Morocco at the 2025 World Athletics Championships over 1500 metres.

== Biography ==
From Oujda, Morocco, Messaoudi competed in the collegiate system in the United States, attending Oklahoma State University from 2022.

Messaoudi had success, winning the 2023 NCAA Indoor Championships over 3000 metres in Albuquerque, New Mexico. He also won the distance medley relay with Oklahoma State at the championships. In June, he placed ninth in the final of the 1500 metres in Austin, Texas at the 2023 NCAA Outdoor Championships. In November 2023, placed tenth overall at the 2023 NCAA Cross Country Championships, held in Charlottesville, Virginia, winning the team title with Oklahoma State. In July, he won the silver medal at the 2023 Arab Games in Algiers in the 1500 metres.

In February 2025, Messaoudi won the mile run at the Razorback International, with a time of 3:52.66 to set a new Oklahoma State school record by over two seconds, and move to seventh on the NCAA all-time list. In March 2025, he placed fourth in the final of the mile run at the 2025 NCAA Indoor Championships in Virginia Beach. In June, he placed eighth in the final of the 5000 metres in Eugene, Oregon at the 2025 NCAA Outdoor Championships. Later that month, he won the 1500 metres in 3:33.93 at the Portland Track Festival in Portland, Oregon.

In July 2025, he placed third over 1500 metres at the Moroccan Championships in a time of 3:48.13. In September 2025, he competed over 1500 metres at the 2025 World Championships in Tokyo, Japan, without advancing to the semi-finals.

In November 2025, he placed fifth overall at the 2025 NCAA Cross Country Championships, helping Oklahoma State to win the team title. Alongside Anass Essayi and Salma Elbadra, he was selected for the mixed relay at the 2026 World Athletics Cross Country Championships in Tallahassee, Florida.

In May 2026, he ran a personal best 3:32.11 for the 1500 metres at the 2026 Meeting International Mohammed VI d'Athlétisme de Rabat, part of the 2026 Diamond League.
