= Saad Hinti =

Moroccan hurdler (born 2002)

Personal information
- Native name: سعد حنتي
- Nationality: Morocco
- Born: 27 April 2002 (24 years, 97 days old)

Sport
- Sport: Athletics
- Events: 400 metres hurdles 400 metres
- College team: Tennessee

Achievements and titles
- National finals: 2021 Moroccan U20s; • 400m hurdles, 1st (gold); 2022 Moroccan Champs; • 400m hurdles, 1st (gold)
- Personal bests: 400mH: 48.44 (2025); 400m: 46.86 (2021)
Medal record
Men's athletics
Representing Morocco
African Games
Gold medal – first place	2023 Accra	400 m hurdles
Islamic Solidarity Games
Gold medal – first place	2021 Konya	4 × 400 m relay
Arab Athletics Championships
Silver medal – second place	2023 Marrakesh	400 m hurdles
Francophone Games
Gold medal – first place	2023 Kinshasa	400 m hurdles
Gold medal – first place	2023 Kinshasa	4 × 400 m relay
Arab U23 Championships
Gold medal – first place	2023 Radès	400 m hurdles
Silver medal – second place	2023 Radès	4 × 400 m
- Updated on 1 January 2024

Saad Hinti (Arabic: سعد حنتي; born 27 April 2002) is a Moroccan hurdler specialising in the 400 metres hurdles. He is the Moroccan Athletics Championships record-holder in the 400 m hurdles, and he won the gold medal in that event at the 2023 Francophone Games and the 2023 Arab U23 Championships.

== Biography ==
At the 2021 Islamic Solidarity Games, Hinti advanced to the finals of the 400 m hurdles by finishing 2nd in his heat, behind Yasmani Copello. In the finals, he finished 6th with a time of 50.28.

Hinti was entered into the 400 m hurdles at the 2021 World Athletics U20 Championships, but he did not start his first-round race. Combined with a false start, this led to a unique situation in which the three remaining competitors of his heat only needed to finish the race in any time to guarantee qualification to the semifinals, as the top three per heat were given automatic qualifiers.

Hinti was also entered in the 400 m hurdles at the 2022 African Championships and 2022 Mediterranean Games, but he did not start either race. At the 2022 Meeting International Mohammed VI d'Athlétisme de Rabat, Hinti finished 7th place in the 400 m hurdles, beating by default the Olympic champion and world record holder Karsten Warholm who did not finish the race. The following month on 22 July, Hinti won the Moroccan Athletics Championships 400 m hurdles title in a new championship record of 50.29 seconds.

At the 2023 Arab Athletics Championships, Hinti won the silver medal in the 400 m hurdles, losing only to a championship record performance by Bassem Hemeida of Qatar. During the separate 2023 Arab Games in Algeria, Hinti qualified for the finals but did not start them, finishing 8th by default.

Hinti recorded his personal best time in the 400 m hurdles in the 2025 SEC Championships representing the University of Tennessee. His time of 48.44 broke the Moroccan national record.

== Statistics ==
=== Personal bests ===
Event	Mark	Place	Competition	Venue	Date	Ref
400 metres hurdles	48.44	1st place, gold medalist(s)	SEC Championships	Lexington, Kentucky	17 May 2025	
400 metres	46.86	2nd place, silver medalist(s)		Rabat, Morocco	2 June 2021	
