= 2021 Arab Athletics Championships =

22nd Arab Athletics Championships
- Dates: 16–20 June 2021
- Host city: Radès, Tunisia
- Participation: ~400 athletes from 16 nations

The 2021 Arab Athletics Championships was the twenty second edition of the international athletics competition between Arab countries that took place from 16 to 20 June 2021 at Rades Athletic Stadium in Radès, close to Tunis, the capital of Tunisia. Around 400 athletes from 18 nations attended the event.

== Medal summary ==
=== Men ===
Event	Gold		Silver		Bronze	
100 metres (wind: 0.0 m/s)	Femi Ogunode; Qatar	10.19	Tosin Ogunode; Qatar	10.41	Barakat Al-Harthi; Oman	10.43
200 metres (wind: -2.0 m/s)	Femi Ogunode; Qatar	20.60	Taha Hussein Yaseen; Iraq	21.00	Noureddine Hadid; Lebanon	21.06
400 metres	Taha Hussein Yaseen; Iraq	46.29	Mohamed Ali Gouaned; Algeria	46.72	Mohamed Abdul Ridha Chunchun; Iraq	46.76
800 metres	Mohamed Ali Gouaned; Algeria	1:46.67	Oussama Nabil; Morocco	1:46.84	Elhassane Moujahid; Morocco	1:47.33
1500 metres	Sadik Mikhou; Bahrain	3:33.81; CR	Abdelatif Sadiki; Morocco	3:34.54	Anass Essayi; Morocco	3:35.59
5000 metres	Zouhair Awad; Bahrain	13:30.25	Sadik Mikhou; Bahrain	13:40.37	Soufiyan Bouqantar; Morocco	13:47.41
10,000 metres	Dawit Fikadu; Bahrain	29:35	Abdel Nasser Al-Mai; Bahrain	29:45	Mouhcine Outalha; Morocco	29:48
Half marathon	Hassan Toriss; Morocco	1:06:48	Othmane El Goumri; Morocco	1:08:09	Joshua Lemushen Nakeri; Bahrain	1:09:09
110 metres hurdles (wind: -0.1 m/s)	Yaqoub Al-Youha; Kuwait	13.71	Amine Bouanani; Algeria	13.83	Mohamed Koussi; Morocco	14.09
400 metres hurdles	Abdelmalik Lahoulou; Algeria	49.45	Ashraf Hussen Osman; Qatar	49.49	Ismail Manyani; Morocco	50.40
3000 metres steeplechase	Mohamed Tindouft; Morocco	8:31.50	Hicham Bouchicha; Algeria	8:33.21	Yaser Bagharab; Qatar	8:34.17
4×100 metres relay	Saudi Arabia; Abdullah Abkar Mohammed; Mahmoud Hafiz Ibrahim; Mohammed Dawood Abdullah; Abd Alhadi Khalid Al-Housaoui	39.69	Oman; Khalaf Ari Samir; Mobarak Baraket; Mohamed Obaid Al-Saadi; Ali Anwar Ali Al-Balushi	39.95	Iraq; Abbas Najim Khadher; Aktham Younus Hussain; Saif Al-Rammahi; Mohamed Hassan Ali Juma	40.74
4×400 metres relay	Iraq; Yasir Ali Al-Saadi; Ihab Jabbar Hashim; Mohamed Abderrid; Taha Hussein Yaseen	3:11.27	Kuwait; Omar Saleh Farag; Mohamed Badr Al-Enezi; Abdulaziz Saif Marzouk; Ramidh Ebrahim	3:14.98	Saudi Arabia; Ibrahim Mohammed Futayni; Anbar Jamaan Alzahrani; Muath Ali Al-Saad ?	3:16.29
20 km walk	Raouf Ben El Abhi; Tunisia	1:28:27	Islam Abdel Awab Abdul Khaliq; Egypt	1:28:50	Mohamed Ragab Saleh; Egypt	1:29:50
High jump	Faleh Abdulwahid; Iraq	2.19 m	Hamdi Al-Amin; Qatar	2.16 m	Hichem Bouhanoun; Algeria	2.05 m
Pole vault	Hussein Al-Hizam; Saudi Arabia	5.55 m CR	Ali Abdulkarim Al-Nasiri; Saudi Arabia	5.15 m	Muntaher Faleh Abdulwahib; Iraq; Majdi Chahata; Tunisia	5.10 m
Long jump	Yasser Triki; Algeria	7.96 m	Mouhcine Khoua; Morocco	7.60 m	Mohamed Salameh; Syria	7.58 m
Triple jump	Yasser Triki; Algeria	17.26 m CR	Mohamed Hammadi; Morocco	16.25 m	Mohamed Salameh; Syria	16.10 m
Shot put	Abdelrahman Mahmoud; Bahrain	21.15 m AR, CR	Mohamed Magdi Hamza Khalif; Egypt	20.30 m	Ibrahim Al-Fadhli; Kuwait	17.71 m
Discus throw	Essa Al-Zenkawi; Kuwait	60.25 m	Moumen Bourekba; Algeria	58.44 m	Shehab Mohamed Abdalaziz; Egypt	58.05 m
Hammer throw	Eslam Moussad Seria; Egypt	71.96 m	Ashraf Amgad El-Seify; Qatar	71.30 m	Hassan Mohamed Mahmoud; Egypt	70.50 m
Javelin throw	Ihab Abdelrahman; Egypt	79.93 m	Maged Mohser El-Badry; Egypt	72.76 m	Younis Mohsen Saleh; Iraq	72.70 m
Decathlon	Larbi Bourrada; Algeria	7311 pts	Abd. El-Sajjad Saadoun Nasser; Iraq	7007 pts	Mustapha Mohamed; Egypt	2976 pts

=== Women ===
Event	Gold		Silver		Bronze	
100 metres (wind: +4.5 m/s)	~~Dana Hussain~~; ~~Iraq~~ (Note: In February 2023, Hussain was given a 2.5 year ban from the sport, starting retroactively from 16 July 2021, due to testing positive for banned substances clenbuterol and stanozolol, disqualifying her results from the 2023 Arab Athletics Championships.); Bassant Hemida; Egypt	~~11.24~~; 11.45	Aziza Sbaity; Lebanon	11.68	Hajar Edaou; Morocco	11.88
200 metres (wind: +2.2 m/s)	~~Dana Hussain~~; ~~Iraq~~; Bassant Hemida; Egypt	~~22.51~~; 23.08	Assia Raziki; Morocco	23.49	Aziza Sbaity; Lebanon	23.80
400 metres	Assia Raziki; Morocco	52.75	Iman Mansour Abdul Muttalib; Egypt (Note: Also named as Eman Abdelmotaleb)	53.34	Salma Lehlali; Morocco	55.23
800 metres	Soukaina Elhaji; Morocco	2:22.44	Amina Bakhit; Sudan	2:22.91	Manal Ebahraoui; Bahrain	2:24.53
1500 metres	Tigist Gashaw; Bahrain	4:18.33	Amina Bakhit; Sudan	4:20.15	Rahma Tahri; Morocco	4:20.85
5000 metres	Rahma Tahiri; Morocco	16:15.37	Tigist Gashaw; Bahrain	16:17.30	Riham Senani; Algeria	16.37.60
10,000 metres	Fatima Ezzahra Gardadi; Morocco	34:58.10	Hanane Qallouje; Morocco	34:59.06	Riham Senani; Algeria	35:16.49
Half marathon	Tejitu Daba; Bahrain	1:16:43	Ruqyah Al-Mukeem; Morocco	1:17:08	Hanane Qallouje; Morocco	1:19:44
100 metres hurdles (wind: -1.8 m/s)	Linha Ahmed; Egypt	14.08	Rahil Hamel; Algeria	14.36	Noura Ennadi; Morocco	14.42
400 metres hurdles	Noura Ennadi; Morocco	56.89	Loubna Benhadja; Algeria	57.39	Samira Messad; Algeria	58.20
3000 metres steeplechase	Marwa Bouzayani; Tunisia	9:48.05	Rihab Dhahri; Tunisia	10:10.15	Fatiha Sanchez; Algeria	10:18.95
4×100 metres relay	Morocco; Yousra Lajdoud; Salma Lehlali; Sara El Hachimi; Hajar Al-Dhaou	46.95	Tunisia; Chayma Ayachi; Abir Barkaoui; Hiba Mansar; Ines Belkacem	47.65	Iraq; Bah Kourdesten; Jamil Sa Roukaya; Mamdouh Barae; Avin Said	50.09
4×400 metres relay	Morocco; Noura Ennadi; Soukaina Hajji; Lamiae Lhabze; Assia Raziki	3:45.64	Tunisia; Hallouma Jerfel; Nourhane Hermi; Marwa Boughanmi; Marwa Bouzayani	3:56.79	Lebanon; Christel El Saneh; Mayssa Mouawad; Joan Makary; Aziza Sbaity	4:12.88
20 km walk	Chahinez Nasri; Tunisia	1:35:47	Nesrine Mejri; Tunisia	1:41:52	Souad Azzi; Algeria	1:45:07
High jump	Rhizlane Siba; Morocco	1.84 m CR	Yousra Araar; Algeria; Aiten Ahmed Yehia; Egypt	1.71 m	Not awarded	
Pole vault	Dorra Mahfoudhi; Tunisia	3.90 m	Meriem Srasra; Tunisia	2.80 m	Not awarded	
Long jump	Esraa Owis; Egypt	6.39 m	Yousra Lajdoud; Morocco	6.29 m	Roumeissa Belabiod; Algeria	5.98 m
Triple jump	Esraa Owis; Egypt	13.06 m	Ghada Hamdani; Tunisia	12.68 m	Kawther Selmi; Algeria	12.46 m
Shot put	Nada Chroudi; Tunisia	15.12 m	Zainab Zeroual; Morocco	13.51 m	Salem Rijaj Essayah; Libya	11.57 m
Discus throw	Salem Rijaj Essayah; Libya	50.36 m	Chaima Chouayakh; Tunisia	49.62 m	Rawand Dhouibi; Tunisia	48.80 m
Hammer throw	Zouina Bouzebra; Algeria	65.20 m	Rawan Ayman Ibrahim Barakat; Egypt	62.23 m	Soukaina Zakkour; Morocco	59.15 m
Javelin throw	Nisreen Lachhab; Tunisia	39.69 m	Rola Sameh Raafat; Egypt	38.91 m	Asia Aziz Kader; Iraq	35.36 m
Heptathlon	Nada Chroudi; Tunisia	5498 pts	Hoda Hagras; Egypt	3464 pts	Salsabil El-Sayyar; Kuwait	2438 pts

== Medal table ==
Key

The host country is highlighted in lavender blue

Rank	Nation	Gold	Silver	Bronze	Total
1	Morocco	10	9	12	31
2	Tunisia*	7	7	2	16
3	Algeria	6	7	8	21
4	Bahrain	6	3	2	11
5	Egypt	5	10	4	19
6	Iraq	5	2	6	13
7	Qatar	2	4	1	7
8	Kuwait	2	1	2	5
9	Saudi Arabia	2	1	1	4
10	Libya	1	0	1	2
11	Sudan	0	2	0	2
12	Oman	0	1	1	2
13	Lebanon	0	0	3	3
14	Syria	0	0	2	2
Totals (14 entries)		46	47	45	138
