= Hajar Eddou =

Moroccan sprinter (born 1999)

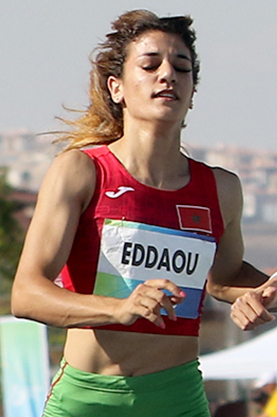
- Hajar Eddou at the 2021 Islamic Solidarity Games

Personal information
- Native name: Arabic: هجر الضو
- Full name: Hajar Eddou; Hajar Edaou; Hajer Edhou; Hajar Eddaou
- Nationality: Morocco
- Born: 15 August 1999 (26 years, 352 days old)
- Height: 168 cm (5 ft 6 in)
- Weight: 56 kg (123 lb)

Sport
- Sport: Athletics
- Events: 100 metres 200 metres

Achievements and titles
- National finals: 2016 Moroccan U18s; • 100m, 1st (gold); 2016 Moroccan Champs; • 100m, 1st (gold); 2021 Moroccan Champs; • 100m, 1st (gold); 2021 Moroccan Champs; • 200m, 1st (gold); 2022 Moroccan Champs; • 100m, 1st (gold); • 200m, 1st (gold); 2023 Moroccan Champs; • 100m, 1st (gold); • 200m, 2nd (silver)
- Personal bests: 100m: 11.46 (+1.6) (2022); 200m: 23.44 (-1.3) (2022)
Medal record
Women's athletics
Representing Morocco
Arab Championships
Gold medal – first place	2017 Radès	4 × 400 m relay
Bronze medal – third place	2021 Radès	100 m
Arab Games
Silver medal – second place	2023 Oran	4 × 100 m relay
- Updated on 1 January 2024

Hajar Eddou (Arabic: هجر الضو; born 15 August 1999), also spelled Hajar Edaou, Hajer Edhou, or Hajar Eddaou, is a Moroccan sprinter specialising in the 100 metres and 200 metres. She is a six-time Moroccan Athletics Championships winner and championship record-holder in the 100 m and 200 m. She was promoted to the bronze medal in the 100 m at the 2021 Arab Athletics Championships following the doping disqualification of the original winner.

== Biography ==
At the 2017 Arab Athletics Championships, Eddou was a member of the gold medal-winning Moroccan 4 × 400 m team. Eddou's first international experience in individual events was at the 2019 Summer Universiade in the 100 m and the 200 m, where she finished 40th and 34th respectively.

Eddou competed in the 100 m at the 2021 Arab Athletics Championships, placing 4th behind initial Iraqi race winner Dana Hussain. However, in February 2023 Eddou was promoted to the bronze medal position following the doping disqualification of Hussein due to a positive drugs test.

Eddou attempted the 100 and 200 double again at the 2022 Mediterranean Games, making the finals in both events. With a 6th-place finish, her better placing was in the 100 m, but her time of 23.73 in the 200 m for 7th was a personal best. At the 2022 Islamic Solidarity Games, Eddou competed in the 100 m, where she advanced to the finals with a wind-aided 11.23 performance in the first round and a 3rd-place finish in her semifinal. In the finals, she placed 5th behind Edidiong Odiong, Farzaneh Fasihi, Maboundou Koné, and Hajar Al-Khaldi. Her time was a wind-legal personal best of 11.20 seconds, but the mark could not be officially ratified due to the photo finish computer timer malfunctioning.

In 2023, Eddou represented Morocco in the 4 × 100 m relay at the 2023 Arab Games. With Eddou on the anchor leg, the team won the silver medal behind Bahrain.

== Statistics ==
=== Personal bests ===
Event	Mark	Place	Competition	Venue	Date	Ref
100 metres	11.46 (+1.6 m/s)	1st place, gold medalist(s)	Moroccan Athletics Championships	Rabat, Morocco	23 July 2022	
100 metres	11.20 (+1.1 m/s) (Note: Mark not considered official due to phototimer malfunction)	5th	Islamic Solidarity Games	Konya, Turkey	10 August 2022	
200 metres	23.44 (-1.3 m/s)	1st place, gold medalist(s)	Moroccan Athletics Championships	Rabat, Morocco	24 July 2022	
