= Abdelrahman Mahmoud =

Bahrani athlete

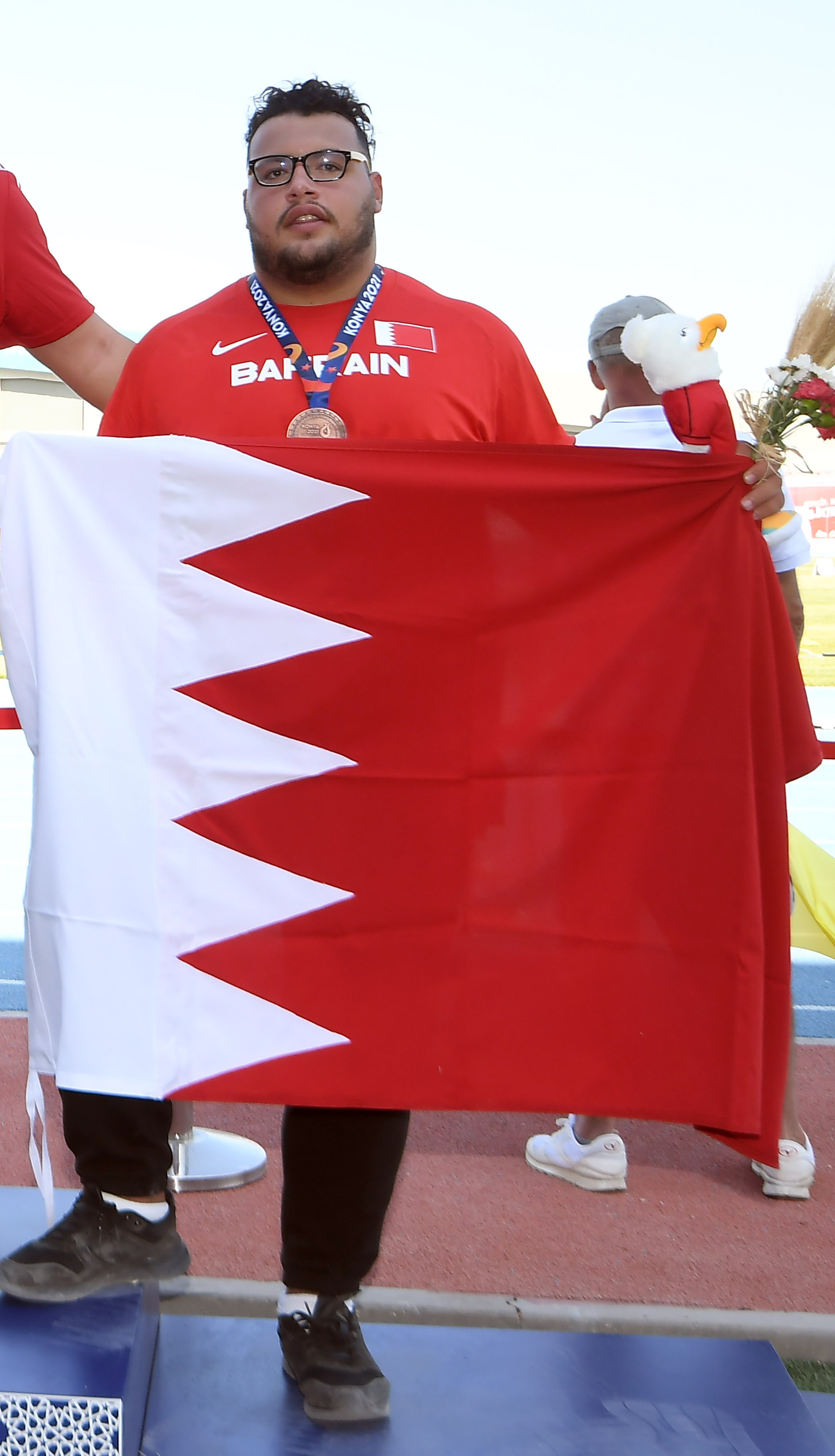
- Abdelrahman Mahmoud in 2022

Personal information
- Born: 1 January 2001 (age 25)

Sport
- Country: Bahrain
- Sport: Athletics
- Event: Shot put

Achievements and titles
- Personal best: 21.15 m (69 ft 4 1/2 in) (2021) NR
Medal record
Men's athletics
Representing Bahrain
Arab Games
Silver medal – second place	2023 Bir El Djir	Shot put
Arab Championships
Gold medal – first place	2021 Radès	Shot put
Islamic Solidarity Games
Bronze medal – third place	2021 Konya	Shot put
Bronze medal – third place	2025 Riyadh	Shot put
West Asian Championships
Gold medal – first place	2023 Doha	Shot put
GCC Games
Gold medal – first place	2022 Kuwait City	Shot put
Arab U23 Championships
Gold medal – first place	2023 Radès	Shot put

Abdelrahman Mahmoud (born 1 January 2001) is a Bahraini athlete who competes in shot put.

== Career ==
Mahmoud gained his first international experience at the 2019 Asian Championships in Doha, where he finished fifth with a new national record of 18.68m. At the end of October he started at the World Military Games in Wuhan, but failed to make a valid attempt there. In 2021, he set a new national record in Belarus in mid-January with 19.61m and improved it the following week to 21.10m, improving the Asian record of Iranian Mehrdelan Shahin from 2020 by 36 centimeters and thus also the qualification standard met for the delayed 2020 Tokyo Olympic Games.
