= Heithem Chenitef =

Algerian athlete (born 2004)

Personal information
- Nationality: Algerian
- Born: 30 January 2004 (age 22)

Sport
- Sport: Athletics
- Event: middle-distance running

Achievements and titles
- Personal bests: 800m: 1:44.38 (Toulouse, 2025); 1500m: 3:34.07 (Pfungstadt, 2025)
Medal record
Men's athletics
Representing Algeria
World U20 Championships
Silver medal – second place	2022 Cali	800m
Arab U23 Championships
Gold medal – first place	2024 Ismailia	800 m
Gold medal – first place	2024 Ismailia	1500 m
Silver medal – second place	2023 Radès	800 m

Heithem Chenitef (born 30 January 2004) is an Algerian middle-distance runner.

== Career ==
won the silver medal in the 800 metres at the 2022 World Athletics U20 Championships in Cali, Colombia, with a personal best time of 1:47.61.

He is a member of MC Alger, and has been coached by former Olympian Reda Abdenouz. He ran a season's indoor best of 1:47.33 competing in Lyon in February 2025. He was selected for the 2025 World Athletics Indoor Championships in Nanjing in March 2025. In September 2025, he competed at the 2025 World Championships in Tokyo, Japan, without advancing to the semi-finals.
