= Vera Sjöberg =

Swedish middle-distance runner

Personal information
- Born: 19 May 2001 (age 25)

Sport
- Sport: Athletics
- Event: Middle-distance running

Achievements and titles
- Personal bests: 1500m: 4:05.09 (Karlstad, 2025); Mile: 4:28.12 (Boston, 2025); 3000m: 8:43.06 (Boston, 2025); 5000m: 15:25.80 (Karlstad, 2025)

Vera Sjöberg (born 19 May 2001) is a Swedish middle-distance runner.

== Biography ==
A member of AIK, she was Swedish under-20 champion in August 2019 over 3000 metres. At the same championships, she finished third in the 1500 metres.

She made her senior debut for Sweden at the 2023 European Athletics Team Championships in Silesia, running a personal best time of 15:53.81 for the 5000 metres.

She ran 4:09.89 for 1500 metres whilst competing at the Valentine Invitational at the Track & Tennis Center in 2025. She finished in eighth place at the 2025 NCAA Indoor Championships in Virginia Beach, completing the mile run in 4:35.34, having run just 0.01 faster to qualify for the final in 4:35.33.

She was selected to compete for Sweden at the 2025 World Athletics Indoor Championships in Nanjing. She qualified for the final of the 1500 metres at the 2025 NCAA Outdoor Championships in Eugene, Oregon in June 2025. She competed for Sweden in the 1500 metres at the 2025 European Athletics Team Championships First Division in Madrid on 29 June 2025. In September 2025, she competed over 1500 metres at the 2025 World Championships in Tokyo, Japan, without advancing to the semi-finals.

On 22 November 2025, she had a top-ten finish at the 2025 NCAA Cross Country Championships in Missouri. She ran a personal best 8:43.06 in Boston in December 2025 for the 3000 metres indoors as she finished runner-up to Salma Elbadra at the Boston University's Sharon Colyear-Danville Season Opener. On 14 March 2026, she placed sixth at the 2026 NCAA Indoor Championships in the 3000 metres, running 8:48.70. The following weekend, she placed seventh 3000 metres at the 2026 World Athletics Indoor Championships in Toruń, Poland. In April, Sjoberg ran a 4:26.15 anchor leg over 1600 metres alongside Sydney Masciarelli, Delea Martins and Makayla Paige as North Carolina set a new NCAA distance medley relay record in winning the Penn Relays in 10:36.82. Competing in May 2026 at the Atlantic Coast Conference Championships Sjoberg took third with a time of 32:48.29 in the 10,000 metres. In June, she qualified for the 2026 NCAA Outdoor Championships. In August, she competed at the 2026 European Athletics Championships in Birmingham, England, placing tenth in the 5000 metres.

== Personal life ==
From Stockholm, Sweden, she attended university in the United States, attending Boston University in Massachusetts.
