= Abdelatif Sadiki =

Moroccan runner (born 1999)

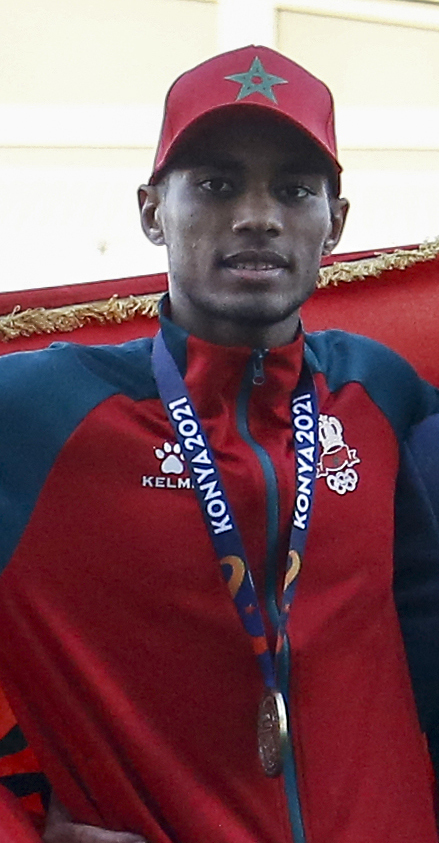
- Sadiki at the 2021 Islamic Solidarity Games

Personal information
- Born: 15 January 1999 (age 27)

Sport
- Country: Morocco
- Event(s): 800 metres, 1500 metres

Achievements and titles
- Personal bests: Outdoor; 800 metres: 1:46.23 (Rabat 2022); 1500 metres: 3:33.59 (Tokyo 2021); Indoor; 1500 metres: 3:37.80 (Liévin 2022)
Medal record
Men's athletics
Representing Morocco
Mediterranean Games
Silver medal – second place	2022 Oran	1500 m
Arab Games
Gold medal – first place	2023 Bir El Djir	1500 m
Islamic Solidarity Games
Gold medal – first place	2021 Konya	1500 m
Arab Championships
Gold medal – first place	2023 Marrakesh	1500 m
Silver medal – second place	2021 Radès	1500 m

Abdelatif Sadiki (Arabic: عبد اللطيف الصديقي; born 15 January 1999) is a Moroccan athlete who specializes in the 1,500 meters event.

He won the silver medal in the 1,500 meters at the Pan Arab Athletics Championships 2021 in Rades.

Sadiki represented Morocco at the 2020 Summer Olympics, where he competed in the men's 1500m.
