= Moroccan Athletics Championships =

- Sport: Track and field
- Founded: 1981
- Country: Morocco

The Moroccan Athletics Championships (French: Championnats Nationaux Athletisme) is an annual outdoor track and field competition organised by the Royal Moroccan Athletics Federation (FRMA, via the French ordering), which serves as the Moroccan national championships for the sport. The two-day event is typically held in early or mid-summer and the venue has varied between Rabat, Salé, Fès, Kenitra, Agadir, Meknès, and Casablanca since 2004. It is open to adults of all ages and is thus referred to as the senior championships, as opposed to the U20 or junior championships.

The next championship will be held on 29–30 June 2024.

== Events ==
On the current programme a total of 36 individual athletics events are contested, divided evenly between men and women. For each of the sexes, there are seven track running events, three obstacle events, three jumps, four throws, and a racewalk event.

Track running

- 100 metres, 200 metres, 400 metres, 800 metres, 1500 metres, 5000 metres, 10,000 metres

Obstacle events

- 100 metres hurdles (women only), 110 metres hurdles (men only), 400 metres hurdles, 3000 metres steeplechase

Jumping events

- High jump, long jump, triple jump

Throwing events

- Shot put, discus throw, javelin throw, hammer throw

Walking events

- 10,000 metres race walk

In 1983 and 1984, a marathon national championship was also held.

== Editions ==
Year	Date	Venue	Stadium
1981			
1982			
1983			
1984			
1985			
1986			
1987			
1988			
1989			
1990			
1991			
1992			
1993			
1994			
1995			
1996			
1997			
1998			
1999			
2000			
2001			
2002			
2003			
2004	6-7 July	Meknès	
2005	25 June	Rabat	
2006			
2007			
2008			
2009	20 June	Rabat	
2010	25-26 June	Agadir	
2011			
2012	15-16 June	Fès	
2013	5-6 July	Casablanca	
2014	20-21 June	Rabat	
2015	5-6 June	Rabat	
2016	3-4 June	Rabat	
2017			
2018	24-25 July	Kenitra	
2019	26–27 July	Salé	
2020			
2021	24-26 June	Rabat	
2022	22-23 July	Rabat	
2023	14-15 July	Rabat	

== Championship records ==
Compiled using winning marks from 1981 to 2005 and results from 2009 to 2010, 2012–2016, 2018–2019, and 2021–2023.

=== Men ===
Event	Record	Athlete	Year	Ref.
100 metres	10.10 w (+2.5 m/s)	Chakir Machmour	2023	
200 metres	20.55 w (+3.5 m/s)	Chakir Machmour	2023	
200 metres	20.80 (−1.3 m/s)	Chakir Machmour	2022	
400 metres	46.0 h	Abderrahim El Haouzy	2000	
800 metres	1:44.25	Nabil Oussama	2021	
1500 metres	3:35.64	Yassine Bensghir	2012	
5000 metres	13:21.11	Mohamed Fares	2021	
10,000 metres	28:07.9 h	Abdelhak El Gorche	1999	
110 metres hurdles	13.78 (+2.0 m/s)	Mohamed Koussi	2021	
400 metres hurdles	50.29	Saad Hinti	2022	
3000 metres steeplechase	8:22.89	Abdelaziz Sahere	1993	

=== Women ===
Event	Record	Athlete	Year	Ref.
100 metres	11.46 (+1.6 m/s)	Hajar Edaou	2022	
200 metres	23.44 (−1.3 m/s)	Hajar Edaou	2022	
400 metres	53.36	Mina Aït Hammou	2004	
800 metres	2:00.93	Halima Hachlaf	2013	
1500 metres	4:10.38	Sultana Aït Hammou	2014	
5000 metres	15:32.44	Kaltoum Bouaasayriya	2014	
10,000 metres	32:17.7 h	Bouchra Chaabi	2000	
100 metres hurdles	13.44 (+1.6 m/s) NR	Yamina Hajjaji	2012	
400 metres hurdles	55.03	Noura Ennadi	2023	
3000 metres steeplechase	9:42.2 h	Salima Alami	2014	
