= Salma Lehlali =

Moroccan sprinter (born 2003)

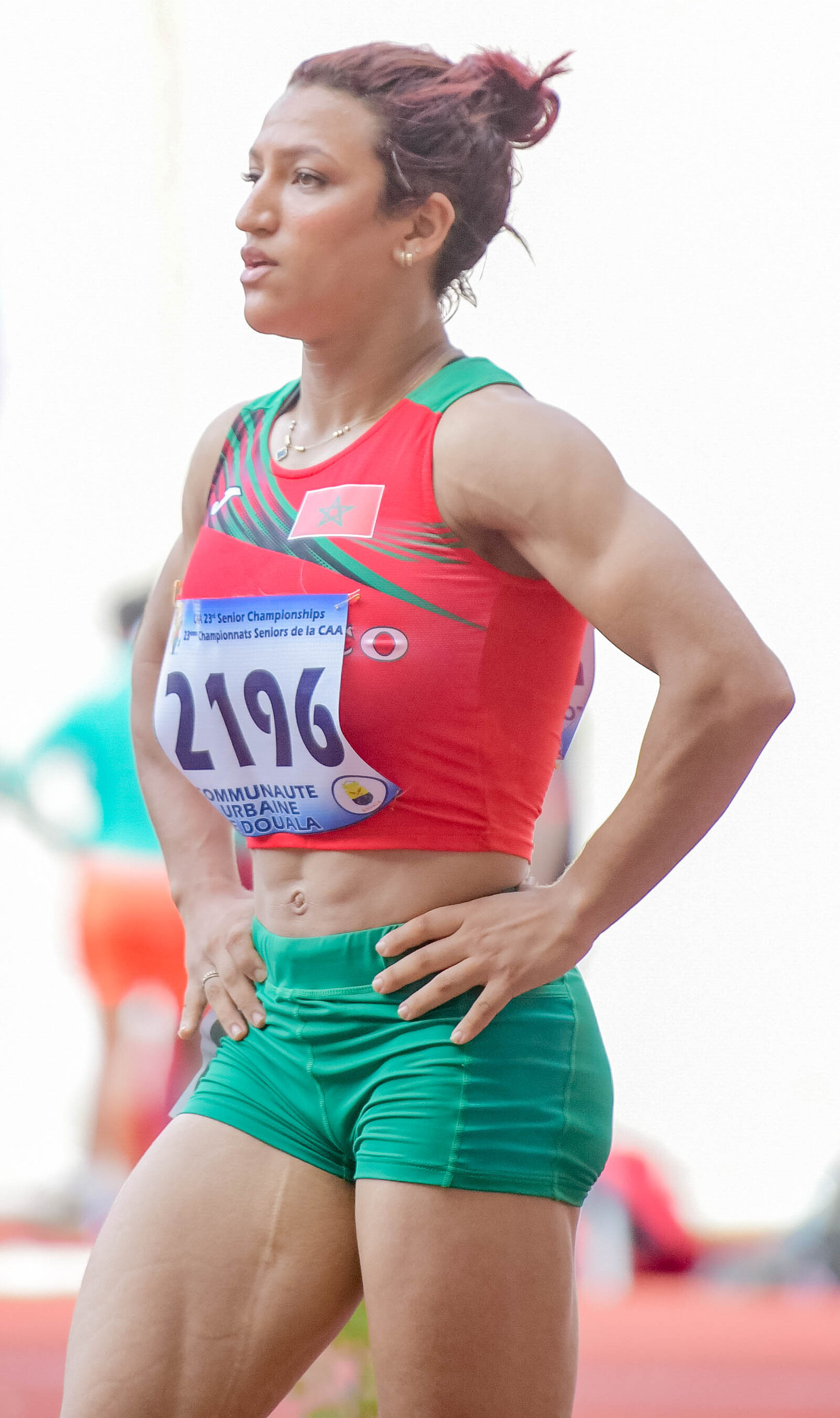
- Lehlali in 2024

Personal information
- Nationality: Moroccan
- Born: 4 March 2003 (age 23)

Sport
- Sport: Athletics
- Event: Sprints
Medal record
Women's athletics
Representing Morocco
Mediterranean Games
Gold medal – first place	2026 Taranto	400 m
Arab Championships
Gold medal – first place	2021 Tunis	4×100 m relay
Gold medal – first place	2023 Marrakesh	400 m
Bronze medal – third place	2021 Tunis	400 m
Arab Games
Silver medal – second place	2023 Algeria	400 m
Silver medal – second place	2023 Algeria	4×100 m relay
Arab U23 Championships
Gold medal – first place	2023 Radès	200 m
Gold medal – first place	2023 Radès	400 m
Gold medal – first place	2024 Ismailia	200 m
Gold medal – first place	2024 Ismailia	400 m

Salma Lehlali (born 4 March 2003) is a Moroccan sprinter. She is a two-time Arab Athletics Championships gold medalist.

== Career ==
In June 2023, Lehlali competed at the 2023 Arab Athletics Championships and won a gold medal in the 400 metres. The next month she competed at the 2023 Arab Games and won silver medals in the 400 metres and 4×100 metre relay.

She competed at the 2024 Arab U23 Athletics Championships and won a gold medal in the 200 metres with a championship record time of 23.87 seconds. She also won a gold medal in the 400 metres with a championship record time of 54.73 seconds.

In September 2026, she competed at the 2026 Mediterranean Games and won a gold medal in the 400 metres with a personal best time of 51.26 seconds.
