= Hanane Qallouj =

Moroccan long-distance runner

Personal information
- Born: 1 February 1992 (age 34)

Sport
- Sport: Track and field

Achievements and titles
- Personal bests: 10,000 m: 32:48.50 (2023); Half marathon: 1:12.15 (2017); Marathon:2:23:27 (2022)
Medal record
Mediterranean Games
Silver medal – second place	2022 Oran	Half marathon
Arab Games
Bronze medal – third place	2023 Algiers	10,000 m

Hanane Qallouj (born 1 February 1992) is a Moroccan long-distance runner.

== Career ==
In the age-specific categories, she competed at the 2009 World Youth Championships and the 2010 World Junior Championships without reaching the final, finished 38th in the junior race at the 2011 World Cross Country Championships and seventh in the 1500 metres at the 2011 African Junior Championships.

As an adult, she concentrated on the 10,000 metres and road running including the marathon. She won the silver medal in the 10,000 metres event at the 2017 Jeux de la Francophonie, won the gold medal in the same event at the 2019 Arab Championships. She followed by a silver medal at the 2021 Arab Championships as well as the bronze medal in the half marathon.

She finished seventh at the 2022 Arab Cross Country Championships, fifth in the 10,000 metres at the 2021 Islamic Solidarity Games (held in 2022) and won the silver medal in the half marathon at the 2022 Mediterranean Games.

In 2023, she saw success in the 10,000 metres: a silver medal at the 2023 Arab Championships, a bronze medal at the 2023 Arab Games, won the Moroccan championships and finished fourth at the 2023 Jeux de la Francophonie. She also finished fourth in the 5000 metres at the 2023 Arab Games, won the silver medal in the half marathon at the 2023 Jeux de la Francophonie, and finished 33rd at the 2023 World Road Running Championships. She then finished 14th at the 2024 African Cross Country Championships.
