= Arab U23 Athletics Championships =

Biennial international athletics competition

The Arab U23 Athletics Championships (French: Championnats Arabes des Espoirs) is an international athletics competition between U23 athletes (under-23) from Arabic countries.

It was first held in 2023, building upon the long-running senior Arab Athletics Championships (created 1977), its corresponding Arab Junior Championships (begun in 1984), and the Arab Youth Championships (created 2004).

== Editions ==
Ed.	Year	City	Country	Dates	No. of events	No. of nations	No. of athletes	Winning Nation
1st	2023	Radès	Tunisia	20–24 May	43	14	181	Morocco
2nd	2024	Ismailia	Egypt	5–9 July				Morocco
3rd	2026	Ismailia	Egypt	20–24 June				Morocco

== Statistics ==
=== Wins by country ===
Overall points winners
Country	Winners	Second	Third	Total
Morocco	3	0	0	3
Egypt	0	3	0	3
Algeria	0	0	3	3

=== All-time medal table (2023-2026) ===
Rank	Nation	Gold	Silver	Bronze	Total
1	Morocco (MAR)	42	33	19	94
2	Egypt (EGY)	33	32	28	93
3	Algeria (ALG)	20	12	21	53
4	Tunisia (TUN)	13	14	12	39
5	Bahrain (BHR)	6	7	1	14
6	Saudi Arabia (KSA)	4	7	9	20
7	Kuwait (KUW)	3	2	7	12
8	Oman (OMA)	3	2	2	7
9	Iraq (IRQ)	2	11	9	22
10	Lebanon (LBN)	2	5	6	13
11	Qatar (QAT)	1	3	2	6
12	Djibouti (DJI)	1	1	2	4
Totals (12 entries)		130	129	118	377

== Championships records ==
=== Men ===
Event	Record	Athlete	Nationality	Date	Championships	Place	Ref
100 m	10.22 (+1.4 m/s)	Ali Anwar Al-Balushi	Oman	5 July 2024	2024	Ismailia, Egypt	
200 m	20.68 (+1.2 m/s)	Ali Anwar Al-Balushi	Oman	8 July 2024	2024	Ismailia, Egypt	
400 m	46.34	Hamza Dair	Morocco	6 July 2024	2024	Ismailia, Egypt	
800 m	1:47.16	Mohamed Ali Gouaned	Algeria	24 May 2023	2023	Radès, Tunisia	
1500 m	3:49.39	Ayanleh Abdi Abdillahi	Djibouti	21 May 2023	2023	Radès, Tunisia	
5000 m	13:40.55	Taha Er Raouy	Morocco	24 May 2023	2023	Radès, Tunisia	
10000 m	29:28.02	Taha Er Raouy	Morocco	6 July 2024	2024	Ismailia, Egypt	
110 m hurdles	13.71 (+1.0 m/s)	Youssef Badwy	Egypt	20 May 2023	2023	Radès, Tunisia	
400 m hurdles	49.94	Marc Anthony Ibrahim	Lebanon	8 July 2024	2024	Ismailia, Egypt	
3000 m steeplechase	8:34.44	Salaheddine Ben Yazide	Morocco	21 May 2023	2023	Radès, Tunisia	
High jump	2.13 m	Youssef Mohamed Fawzy	Egypt	6 July 2024	2024	Ismailia, Egypt	
Pole vault	5.30 m	Seif Heneida	Qatar	21 May 2023	2023	Radès, Tunisia	
Long jump	7.71 m (+0.3 m/s)	Zayed Latif	Morocco	5 July 2024	2024	Ismailia, Egypt	
Triple jump	16.50 m (±0.0 m/s)	Adem Boualbani	Algeria	23 May 2023	2023	Radès, Tunisia	
Shot put	19.90 m	Abdelrahman Mahmoud	Bahrain	20 May 2023	2023	Radès, Tunisia	
Discus throw	53.93 m	Abdullah Mohammad Al Zankawi	Kuwait	8 July 2024	2024	Ismailia, Egypt	
Hammer throw	67.46 m	Mubeen Rashid Ibrahim Al Kindi	Oman	7 July 2024	2024	Ismailia, Egypt	
Javelin throw	77.85 m	Moustafa Mahmoud	Egypt	23 May 2023	2023	Radès, Tunisia	
Decathlon	7389 pts	Ahmed Mahmoud Taher	Egypt	7–8 July 2024	2024	Ismailia, Egypt	

=== Women ===
Event	Record	Athlete	Nationality	Date	Championships	Place	Ref
100 m	11.97 (+1.0 m/s)	Maram Mahmoud Ahmed	Egypt	21 May 2023	2023	Radès, Tunisia	
200 m	23.87 (+1.9 m/s)	Salma Lehlali	Morocco	8 July 2024	2024	Ismailia, Egypt	
400 m	54.73	Salma Lehlali	Morocco	6 July 2024	2024	Ismailia, Egypt	
800 m	2:14.82	Salma Elbadra	Morocco	8 July 2024	2024	Ismailia, Egypt	
1500 m	4:18.77	Rihab Dhahri	Tunisia	24 May 2023	2023	Radès, Tunisia	
5000 m	16:35.20	Fatima Aafir	Morocco	5 July 2024	2024	Ismailia, Egypt	
10000 m	36:20.97	Fatima Aafir	Morocco	7 July 2024	2024	Ismailia, Egypt	
100 m hurdles	14.01 (+1.5 m/s)	Malak Ayman Rashwan	Egypt	5 July 2024	2024	Ismailia, Egypt	
400 m hurdles	59.60	Rasha Badrani	Lebanon	8 July 2024	2024	Ismailia, Egypt	
3000 m steeplechase	10:10.28	Malak Abdelghany Abdalla Ibrahim	Egypt	21 June 2026	2026	Ismailia, Egypt	
High jump	1.77 m	Safae Maskani	Morocco	8 July 2024	2024	Ismailia, Egypt	
Pole vault	3.65 m	Rasha Tamer Tawfik	Egypt	7 July 2024	2024	Ismailia, Egypt	
Long jump	5.98 m (+0.2 m/s)	Salma Abdulhamid Hamed	Egypt	6 July 2024	2024	Ismailia, Egypt	
Triple jump	13.14 m (+0.4 m/s)	Wissal Harkas	Algeria	24 May 2023	2023	Radès, Tunisia	
Shot put	13.86 m	Lyna Benaibouche	Algeria	8 July 2024	2024	Ismailia, Egypt	
Discus throw	52.38 m	Ghofrane Hamdi	Tunisia	6 July 2024	2024	Ismailia, Egypt	
Hammer throw	60.25 m	Rawan Barakat	Egypt	23 May 2023	2023	Radès, Tunisia	
Javelin throw	41.50 m	Shahinaz Sayed Faki	Egypt	5 July 2024	2024	Ismailia, Egypt	
