= Rihab Dhahri =

Tunisin steeplechase runner (born 2003)

Personal information
- Born: 9 September 2003 (age 22)

Sport
- Sport: Athletics
- Event: Steeplechase

Achievements and titles
- Personal bests: 2000m s'chase: 6:16.62 (2025); 3000m s'chase: 9:20.17 (2025)
Medal record
Women's athletics
Representing Tunisia
Mediterranean Games
Silver medal – second place	2026 Taranto	3000 m s'chase
Arab Championships
Gold medal – first place	2025 Oran	3000 m s'chase

Rihab Dhahri (born 9 September 2003) is a Tunisian steeplechaser. She competed in the 3000 metres steeplechase at the 2025 World Championships.

== Career ==
She finished fourth in the 3000 metres steeplechase at the 2022 World Athletics U20 Championships in Cali, Colombia in 10:06.42 having gone into the championships with a personal best of 10:03.15. She had a top-ten finish in the 3000m steeplechase at the 2023 Africa Games in Accra, Ghana, placing ninth overall.

She won the gold medal at the 2025 Arab Athletics Championships in Oran in May 2025 in the 3000 metres steeplechase. In June 2025, she set a new personal best for the 3000m steeplechase in Hengelo, Netherlands before winning on the World Athletics Continental Tour at the bronze meeting in Warsaw, Poland in 9:42.42.

In July 2025, she won the 3000m steeplechase at the Tunisian Athletics Championships in July 2025. Later that month, she ran a personal best time of 6:16.62 in the women's 2000m steeplechase in Berlin, Germany. The following month, she lowered her personal best for the 3000m steeplechase to 9:20.17 whilst running in Oordegem, Belgium. She placed eighth on 20 August in the 2025 Diamond League event in Switzerland at the 2025 Athletissima in wet conditions in Lausanne. She placed ninth at the Diamond League Final in Zurich on 28 August.

She competed at the 2025 World Athletics Championships in Tokyo, but did not qualify for the final of the 3000 metres steeplechase.
