= Mohamed Ali Gouaned =

Algerian track and field athlete

Personal information
- Native name: محمد علي قواند
- Nationality: Algerian
- Born: 5 July 2002 (age 23) Biskra, Algeria

Sport
- Country: Algeria
- Sport: Athletics
- Event: 400 meters 800 meters
- Club: US Biskra
- Coached by: Nadir Nebchi

Achievements and titles
- Personal bests: 400 m: 46.21 (2021); 600 m: 1:14.79 WU20B (2021); 800 m: 1:43.56 (2025); 1000 m: 2:20.24 (2021)
Medal record
Men's athletics
Representing Algeria
Mediterranean Games
Gold medal – first place	2022 Oran	4 × 400 m relay
World U20 Championships
Silver medal – second place	2021 Nairobi	800 m
African U20 Championships
Silver medal – second place	2019 Abidjan	800 m
Arab U23 Championships
Gold medal – first place	2023 Radès	800 m
Gold medal – first place	2023 Radès	4 × 400 m

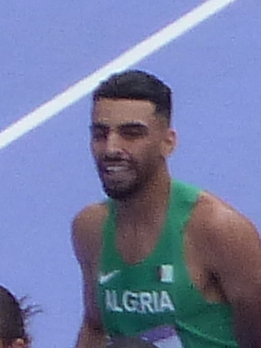
Mohammed Ali Gouaned

Mohamed Ali Gouaned (محمد علي قواند) (5 July 2002, Biskra) is an Algerian middle-distance runner specializing in the 400 meters and 800 meters. He holds the Junior World best in 600 meters with a time of 1:14:79 set in Algiers on 26 March 2021 breaking the record held by Wilfred Bungei since 1 September 1999 with a time of 1:14:94.

Gouaned won a silver medal in the 800m Youth race at the 2019 African U18 and U20 Championships in Athletics held in Abidjan (Côte d'Ivoire) behind Abdo Razack Hassan from Djibouti setting in the process an Algerian Youth record in 800m with a time of 1:47:88. Gouaned also won a silver medal in the 800m at the Athletics at the 2018 Summer Youth Olympics held in Buenos Aires (Argentina) behind Tasew Yada of Ethiopia.

Gouaned also holds the Algerian Youth record in 400m with 46:76 established in Ninove meeting Belgium in 2019. He also set a national junior record (NJR) in 800m race with a time of 1:46:35 in Batna Meeting (Algeria) after finishing second to Djamel Sejati. Later in May 2021, Gouaned won 800m race B at the 2021 Doha Diamond League meeting improving the NJR to 1:45.47

Gouaned won a gold medal at the 2021 Arab Athletics Championships held in Tunis (Tunisia) in the 800 m race with a time 1:46.67 ahead of Moroccan Oussama Nabil, and won a silver medal in the 400 m race at the same championships setting in the process a personal best of 46.72 sec behind Taha Hussein Yaseen from Iraq. On 29 June 2021, he ran another personal best on the 400 m with a time of 46.21 at the SATO stadium (Algiers).

On 22 August 2021 Gouaned finished second at the 2021 World Athletics U20 Championships in Nairobi second after Emmanuel Wanyonyi setting another Algerian junior record in 800 with a time of 1:44.45.

== Personal bests ==
Outdoor

- 200 metres – 21.64 (Tlemcen, 13 July 2019)
- 400 metres – 46.21 (Algiers, 29 June 2021)
- 600 metres – 1:14.79 (Algiers, 26 March 2021)
- 800 metres – 1:43.56 (Brescia, 15 July 2025)
- 1000 metres – 2:20.24 (Algiers, 27 March 2021)
