= 2006 Arab Junior Athletics Championships =

12th Arab Junior Athletics Championships
- Host city: Cairo, Egypt
- Events: 44

The 2006 Arab Junior Athletics Championships was the 12th edition of the international athletics competition for under-20 athletes from Arab countries. It took place in Cairo, Egypt. A total of 44 athletics events were contested, 22 for men and 22 for women.

== Medal summary ==
=== Men ===
| Event | Gold | | Silver | | Bronze | |
|---|---|---|---|---|---|---|
| 100 metres +1.3 m/s | Rachid Said Arnous (JOR) | 10.30 =CR | Mahmoud Ferid Taha (BHR) | 10.66 | Ahmed Nasr Al Ouhibi (OMN) | 10.68 |
| 200 metres | Mohamed Salem Al Rouahi (OMN) | 21.23 | Adel Jaber Al Assiri (KSA) | 21.55 | Rachid Said Arnous (JOR) | 21.60 |
| 400 metres | Mohamed Salem Al Rouahi (OMN) | 46.96 | Ismail Mohamed Al Sayani (KSA) | 47.54 | Ahmed Nasr Al Ouhibi (OMN) | 47.55 |
| 800 metres | Belal Ali Belal Mansoor (BHR) | 1:46.92 CR | Aboubaker Kaki Khamis (SUD) | 1:48.36 | Wilyam Filiph Rabih (SUD) | 1:48.95 |
| 1500 metres | Belal Ali Belal Mansoor (BHR) | 3:45.88 | Aboubaker Kaki Khamis (SUD) | 3:47.58 | Thamer Kamel Ali (QAT) | 3:49.88 |
| 5000 metres | Adam Ismail Issa (BHR) | 13:57.1 CR | Mohamed Abda Bakhit (QAT) | 13:59.8 | Nasr Jamel Nasr (QAT) | 14:10.5 |
| 10,000 metres | Adam Ismail Issa (BHR) | 28:49.1 CR | Nasr Jamel Nasr (QAT) | 29:04.7 | Majed Salah Beshir (BHR) | 29:05.2 |
| 110 metres hurdles +1.0 m/s | Abderrahman Idriss Tahar (EGY) | 13.79 CR | Mostafa Habub Al Ajami (KSA) | 14.24 | Ghrib Mohamed Al Khaldi (OMN) | 14.34 |
| 400 metres hurdles | Mohamed Yahia Razgallah Daak (KSA) | 52.28 | Hafedh Mohamed Hussein (SUD) | 52.74 | Mohamed Mahmoud Mouskani (SYR) | 53.85 |
| 3000 metres steeplechase | Tarek Moubarek Salem (BHR) | 8:42.08 CR | Salem Said Malek (QAT) | 9:01.51 | Ali Al Amri (KSA) | 9:10.32 |
| 4 × 100 m relay | Egypt (EGY) | 41.87 | Oman (OMN) | 42.26 | Bahrain (BHR) | 42.29 |
| 4 × 400 m relay | Saudi Arabia (KSA) | 3:15.62 | Oman (OMN) | 3:17.70 | Sudan (SUD) | 3:17.38 |
| 10,000 m walk | Mostafa Ali Badir (EGY) | 45:47.92 | Ahmed Ahmed Said (EGY) | 47:47.63 | Wissam Fouad Ghibour (SYR) | 48:51.75 |
| High jump | Hachem Issa Al Okibi (KSA) | 2.15 m CR | Karim Samir Lotfi Essaied (EGY) | 2.15 m | Majd Eddine Ghazal (SYR) | 2.09 m |
| Pole vault | Mohamed Essaied Abdallah (QAT) | 4.10 m | Mostafa Naji Mohamed Sami (EGY) | 4.00 m | Mohamed Abdelmonaam Mohamed (EGY) | 3.70 m |
| Long jump | Ahmed Nizar Hachem Al Chorfa (KSA) | 7.62 m CR | Mohamed Fathallah Dhiffalah (EGY) | 7.42 m | Karim Samir Lotfi Essaid (EGY) | 7.06 m |
| Triple jump | Sergey Brigadniy (BHR) | 15.26 m | Amin Mohamed Ahmed Mohamed (EGY) | 14.92 m | Ahmed Said Medkhli (KSA) | 14.58 m |
| Shot put | Ali Mostafa Abdelmaati (EGY) | 20.42 m CR | Mohamed Mechari Saad Serour (KUW) | 19.90 m | Amin Kacem Mohamed (QAT) | 16.45 m |
| Discus throw | Ibrahim Abdallah Al Foudri (KUW) | 51.00 m | Omar Abdelila Sellane (IRQ) | 48.20 m | Ahmed Abdallah Abed Abou Al Ala (EGY) | 46.47 m |
| Hammer throw | Mostafa Mohamed Hicham (EGY) | 65.96 m | Sharif Mohsen Mohamed Ahmed (EGY) | 61.50 m | Mohamed Omar Mohamed Omar Khatib (UAE) | 60.40 m |
| Javelin | Mohamed Ali Kbabou (TUN) | 70.47 m CR | Khamis Ghabech Ketiti (OMN) | 65.64 m | Abdallah Adnen Al Omri (KUW) | 64.09 m |
| Decathlon | Saad Fahed Al Bichi (KSA) | 6735 pts | Firas Abderrahman Said Abdelwahab (KSA) | 6477 pts | Ahmed Abdallah Mokbali (OMN) | 6314 pts |

=== Women ===
| Event | Gold | | Silver | | Bronze | |
|---|---|---|---|---|---|---|
| 100 metres +1.1 m/s | Ghofrane Mohammad (SYR) | 12.43 | Chahira Ismail Mostafa (EGY) | 12.76 | Lemy Hussein Sami (EGY) | 12.79 |
| 200 metres +3.5 m/s | Ghofrane Mohammad (SYR) | 24.39 | Doaa Abou Ali Abdeljabar (EGY) | 25.39 | Nawal El Jack (SUD) | 25.42 |
| 400 metres | Nawal El Jack (SUD) | 56.21 | Faiza Omar Jomaa (SUD) | 57.01 | Narmin Mahmoud Nadim (EGY) | 58.64 |
| 800 metres | Amina Bakhit (SUD) | 2:13.94 | Sarra Bakhit Youssef (BHR) | 2:14.05 | Mona Jabir Adam Mohamed (SUD) | 2:14.92 |
| 1500 metres | Amina Bakhit (SUD) | 4:31.20 | Sarra Bakhit Youssef (BHR) | 4:31.23 | Heba Kamel Aid Alem (EGY) | 4:46.93 |
| 3000 metres | Karima Saleh Jassem (BHR) | 9:41.1 | Imen Mounir Al Jellad (SYR) | 9:55.9 | Sarra Ahmed Abou El Hassen (EGY) | 9:56.5 |
| 5000 metres | Karima Saleh Jassem (BHR) | 16:36.69 CR | Mechaar Ali Abdelrrahman Bakhi (SYR) | 17:03.23 | Sarra Ahmed Abou El Hassen (EGY) | 17:21.85 |
| 100 m hurdles -0.5 m/s | Salma Imam Abou El Hassen (EGY) | 14.61 | Fadwa Al-Bouza (SYR) | 14.66 | Nejla Achour Khelifa (EGY) | 16.50 |
| 400 metres hurdles | Ghofrane Mohammad (SYR) | 58.82 CR | Mona Jabir Adam (SUD) | 1:01.56 | Ijane Mhamdi Ali El Cheikh (EGY) | 1:04.10 |
| 3000 metres steeplechase | Karima Saleh Jassem (BHR) | 10:35.8 | Dorka Mana Kalamaya (SUD) | 10:46.9 | Hiba Kamel Aid (EGY) | 11:48.0 |
| 4 × 100 m relay | Egypt (EGY) | 48.95 | Sudan (SUD) | 49.69 | Syria (SYR) | 50.51 |
| 4 × 400 m relay | Sudan (SUD) | 3:53.23 | Egypt (EGY) | 3:56.96 | Syria (SYR) | 4:06.43 |
| 5000 m walk | Rania Mohamed Othman (SYR) | 25:59.5 | Olfa Hamdi (TUN) | 26:00.3 | Nachoua Ibrahim Fethi (EGY) | 26:38.2 |
| High jump | Sarra Helmi Moslahi Mohamed (EGY) | 1.65 m | Dalia Alaa Eddine Mohamed (EGY) | 1.55 m | Rania Chokri Said Kabali (JOR) | 1.35 m |
| Pole vault | Yasmine Ali Othman (EGY) | 3.20 m | Dina Ahmed Tabaa (EGY) | 3.20 m | not awarded | |
| Long jump | Rima Ferid Mohamed Taha (JOR) | 6.00 m CR | Ines Mohamed Ghrib (EGY) | 5.78 m | Fadwa Al-Bouza (SYR) | 5.58 m |
| Triple jump | Fadwa Al-Bouza (SYR) | 12.54 m | Ines Mohamed Ghrib (EGY) | 12.53 m | Hedir Helmi Jabrouni (EGY) | 11.46 m |
| Shot put | Imen Ali Ahmed Abdennebi (EGY) | 13.16 m | Oula Mohamed Attia Khalil (EGY) | 12.16 m | Hiba Omar (SYR) | 11.87 m |
| Discus throw | Sarra Essaid Hassib (EGY) | 44.64 m | Imen Mahmoud Kamel (EGY) | 39.02 m | Hiba Omar (SYR) | 38.20 m |
| Hammer throw | Imen Mohamed Abdelhakim El Acheri (EGY) | 53.34 m CR | Noura Adel Zakaria Abdallah (EGY) | 53.10 m | Amina Hamdi (TUN) | 48.59 m |
| Javelin | Sabiha Mzoughi (TUN) | 42.97 m | Nada Jamel Abdelhalim (EGY) | 41.16 m | Amani Mansour Ali Saad (EGY) | 40.72 m |
| Heptathlon | Mona Jabir (SUD) | 4386 pts | Ijane Mhamdi Ali (EGY) | 4199 pts | Marwa Mohamed Naim (EGY) | 3583 pts |

== Medal table ==
| Rank | Nation | Gold | Silver | Bronze | Total |
|---|---|---|---|---|---|
| 1 | Egypt (EGY) | 12 | 18 | 15 | 45 |
| 2 | Bahrain (BHR) | 9 | 3 | 2 | 14 |
| 3 | Sudan (SUD) | 5 | 7 | 4 | 16 |
| 4 | Saudi Arabia (KSA) | 5 | 4 | 2 | 11 |
| 5 | Syria (SYR) | 5 | 3 | 8 | 16 |
| 6 | Oman (OMN) | 2 | 3 | 4 | 9 |
| 7 | Tunisia (TUN) | 2 | 1 | 1 | 4 |
| 8 | Jordan (JOR) | 2 | 0 | 2 | 4 |
| 9 | Qatar (QAT) | 1 | 3 | 3 | 7 |
| 10 | Kuwait (KUW) | 1 | 1 | 1 | 3 |
| 11 | Iraq (IRQ) | 0 | 1 | 0 | 1 |
| 12 | United Arab Emirates (UAE) | 0 | 0 | 1 | 1 |
| Totals (12 entries) | | 44 | 44 | 43 | 131 |
