= Arab Junior Athletics Championships =

Biennial international athletics competition

Arab Junior Athletics Championships البطولة العربية للشباب والشابات لألعاب القوى
- Status: active
- Genre: sports event
- Date: midyear
- Frequency: biennial
- Inaugurated: 1984
- Organiser: Arab Athletic Association

The Arab Junior Athletics Championships (Arabic: البطولة العربية للشباب والشابات لألعاب القوى), also known as the Arab U20 Athletics Championships, is a biennial international athletics competition between athletes under the age of 20 (juniors) from Arabic countries. It is organised by the Arab Athletic Association.

If was first held in 1984 – seven years after the inauguration of the senior Arab Athletics Championships. An Arab Youth Athletics Championships was launched twenty years after the junior competition.

== Editions ==
Ed.	Year	City	Country	Dates	Venue	No. of events	No. of nations	No. of athletes			Winning Nation
Ed.	Year	City	Country	Dates	Venue	No. of events	No. of nations	M	W	Total	Winning Nation
1st	1984	Casablanca	Morocco	20–23 July		38	10				Morocco
2nd	1986	Cairo	Egypt	8–11 July		38	13				Tunisia
3rd	1988	Damascus	Syria	22–25 August		41	13				Tunisia
4th	1990	Latakia	Syria	5–6 September		18	3	x			Egypt
4th	1991	Latakia	Syria	1–4 October			14		x		
5th	1992	Latakia	Syria	17–19 August		40	8				Algeria
6th	1994	Tunis	Tunisia	9–12 August		42	10				Tunisia
7th	1996	Latakia	Syria	13–16 September		41	14				Algeria
8th	1998	Damascus	Syria	26–29 August		41	13				Tunisia
9th	2000	Damascus	Syria	3–5 November		42	11				Egypt
10th	2002	Cairo	Egypt	16–18 September	Cairo International Stadium	43	17			400	Morocco
11th	2004	Damascus	Syria	10–13 September	Tishreen Stadium	43	17				Sudan
12th	2006	Cairo	Egypt	24–27 July	Cairo Military Academy Stadium	44	14			500	Egypt
13th	2008	Rades	Tunisia	20–23 June	Radès Olympic Athletics Stadium	44	13				Tunisia
14th	2010	Cairo	Egypt	5–8 May	Cairo Military Academy Stadium	44	19				Egypt
15th	2012	Amman	Jordan	16–19 May	Amman International Stadium	42	16				Egypt
16th	2014	Cairo	Egypt	23–26 April	Khalaf Ahmad Al Habtoor Stadium	44	16				Egypt
17th	2016	Tlemcen	Algeria	5–8 May	Lalla Setti Stadium	44	11			800	Bahrain
18th	2018	Amman	Jordan	19–22 April	Amman Baccalaureat School	44	14			423	Morocco
19th	2022	Radès	Tunisia	22–26 May	Radès Olympic Athletics Stadium	39	15			147	Egypt
20th	2024	Ismailia	Egypt	8–11 May			13				Egypt
21st	2026	Radès	Tunisia	26–30 April	Radès Olympic Athletics Stadium		14				Morocco

== Statistics ==
=== Wins by country ===
Until 2026

Overall points winners
Country	Winners	Second	Third	Total
Egypt	8	4	2	14
Tunisia	5	4	2	11
Morocco	4	3	1	8
Algeria	2	2	6	10
Bahrain	1	3	2	6
Sudan	1	1	1	3
Qatar	0	2	2	4
Syria	0	2	1	3
Saudi Arabia	0	1	4	5
Palestine	0	0	1	1

=== All-time medal table 1984–2026 ===
Rank	Nation	Gold	Silver	Bronze	Total
1	Egypt (EGY)	164	160	114	438
2	Tunisia (TUN)	134	119	118	371
3	Algeria (ALG)	104	120	115	339
4	Morocco (MAR)	87	94	93	274
5	Saudi Arabia (KSA)	72	72	44	188
6	Qatar (QAT)	67	43	39	149
7	Bahrain (BHR)	67	38	28	133
8	Sudan (SUD)	39	38	26	103
9	Syria (SYR)	38	70	88	196
10	Kuwait (KUW)	32	37	42	111
11	Iraq (IRQ)	17	22	41	80
12	Jordan (JOR)	8	11	24	43
13	United Arab Emirates (UAE)	8	7	8	23
14	Oman (OMN)	6	11	23	40
15	Lebanon (LIB)	5	4	9	18
16	Djibouti (DJI)	5	4	2	11
17	Libya (LBY)	3	3	11	17
18	Palestine (PLE)	1	1	11	13
19	Yemen (YEM)	1	1	5	7
Totals (19 entries)		858	855	841	2,554

== Championships records ==
Key: Defunct event

=== Men ===
Event	Record	Athlete	Nationality	Date	Championships	Place	Ref.
100 m	10.30 (+1.3 m/s)	Rachid Said Arnous	Jordan	November 2006	2006 Championships	Cairo, Egypt	
100 m	10.3 h	Khalid Yousef Al-Obaidli	Qatar	1998	1998 Championships	Damascus, Syria	
100 m	10.3 h	Ibrahim Ismail Muftah	Qatar	1988	1988 Championships	Damascus, Syria	
200 m	20.85	Mohammed Sanad Al-Rashidi	Bahrain	2004	2004 Championships	Damascus, Syria	
400 m	45.7	Fawzi Al-Shammari	Kuwait	1998	1998 Championships	Damascus, Syria	
800 m	1:46.92	Belal Ali Belal Mansoor	Bahrain	November 2006	2006 Championships	Cairo, Egypt	
1500 m	3:39.74	Mohamad Al-Garni	Bahrain	May 2010	2010 Championships	Cairo, Egypt	
3000 m	8:04.51	Osama Al-Ridwani	Morocco	8 May 2024	2024 Championships	Ismailia, Egypt	
5000 m	13:57.1	Adam Ismail Issa	Bahrain	November 2006	2006 Championships	Cairo, Egypt	
10,000 m	28:49.1	Adam Ismail Issa	Bahrain	1 November 2006	2006 Championships	Cairo, Egypt	
20 km (road)	1:04:43	Moussa Al-Hariri	Syria	1988	1988 Championships	Damascus, Syria	
30 km (road)	1:42:00	Ahmed Ibrahim Warsama	Qatar	July 1984	1984 Championships	Casablanca, Morocco	
110 m hurdles	13.71	Mousa Alsebiani	Saudi Arabia	May 2012	2012 Championships	Amman, Jordan	
400 m hurdles	50.81	Bandar Yahya Sharahili	Saudi Arabia	2004	2004 Championships	Damascus, Syria	
2000 m steeplechase	5:47.33	Mohammed Barak Al-Dosari	Saudi Arabia	July 1984	1984 Championships	Casablanca, Morocco	
3000 m steeplechase	8:42.08	Tarek Moubarek Salem	Bahrain	November 2006	2006 Championships	Cairo, Egypt	
High jump	2.23 m	Mutaz Essa Barshim	Qatar	May 2010	2010 Championships	Cairo, Egypt	
Pole vault	5.32 m	Hussein Assim Al-Hazzam	Saudi Arabia	April 2014	2014 Championships	Cairo, Egypt	
Long jump	7.62 m	Ahmed Nizar Hachem Al Chorfa	Saudi Arabia	November 2006	2006 Championships	Cairo, Egypt	
Triple jump	16.49 m (+1.1 m/s)	Sami Moussa Bakheet	Saudi Arabia	10 May 2024	2024 Championships	Ismailia, Egypt	
Shot put	21.79 m	Mustafa Amrou Ahmed	Egypt	April 2014	2014 Championships	Cairo, Egypt	
Discus throw	60.13 m	Moadh Mohamed Ibrahim	Qatar	May 2016	2016 Championships	Tlemcen, Algeria	
Hammer throw	78.62 m	Ashraf Amgad Elseify	Qatar	May 2012	2012 Championships	Amman, Jordan	
Javelin throw	73.67 m	Ihab Abdelrahman El Sayed	Egypt	June 2008	2008 Championships	Radès, Tunisia	
Decathlon	7216 pts	Mohamed Ahmed Al Mannai	Qatar	May 2010	2010 Championships	Cairo, Egypt	
Decathlon	100m (wind) / Long jump (wind) / Shot put / High jump / 400m / 110m H (wind) / Discus / Pole vault / Javelin / 1500m						
10,000 m walk (track)	42:49.22	Hédi Teraoui	Tunisia	June 2008	2008 Championships	Radès, Tunisia	
15 km walk (road)	1:17:38	Arezki Boumrar	Algeria	July 1984	1984 Championships	Casablanca, Morocco	
4 × 100 m relay	40.1		Qatar	1998	1998 Championships	Damascus, Syria	
4 × 400 m relay	3:08.82		Saudi Arabia	2000	2000 Championships	Damascus, Syria	

=== Women ===
Event	Record	Athlete	Nationality	Date	Championships	Place	Ref.
100 m	11.55 (+0.1 m/s)	Raihanah Garoubah	Bahrain	27 April 2026	2026 Championships	Radès, Tunisia	
200 m	23.21	Edwilge Ova Naim	Bahrain	May 2016	2016 Championships	Tlemcen, Algeria	
400 m	53.42	Zenab Moussa Ali Mahamat	Bahrain	23 May 2022	2022 Championships	Radès, Tunisia	
800 m	2:08.51	Alawia Maki	Sudan	May 2010	2010 Championships	Cairo, Egypt	
1500 m	4:16.24	Dalila Abdelkader	Bahrain	May 2016	2016 Championships	Tlemcen, Algeria	
3000 m	9:14.07	Tejitu Daba	Bahrain	May 2010	2010 Championships	Cairo, Egypt	
5000 m	16:36.61	Hanane Agoujdad	Morocco	29 April 2026	2026 Championships	Radès, Tunisia	
10,000 m	37:46.76	Fatiha Killech	Morocco	1994	1994 Championships	Tunis, Tunisia	
100 m hurdles	14.02	Nour Nadi	Morocco	20 April 2018	2018 Championships	Amman, Jordan	
400 m hurdles	58.25	Aminat Yusuf Jamal	Bahrain	May 2016	2016 Championships	Tlemcen, Algeria	
3000 m steeplechase	9:55.38	Ruth Jebet	Bahrain	April 2014	2014 Championships	Cairo, Egypt	
High jump	1.76 m	Basant Musaad Mohammad	Egypt	May 2010	2010 Championships	Cairo, Egypt	
Pole vault	3.60 m	Nour Slimane	Egypt	April 2018	2018 Championships	Amman, Jordan	
Long jump	6.00 m	Rima Ferid Mohamed Taha	Jordan	1 November 2006	2006 Championships	Cairo, Egypt	
Triple jump	13.84 m	Baya Rahouli	Algeria	1996	1996 Championships	Latakia, Syria	
Shot put	14.74 m	Hebat-Allah Mustafa Mohamed	Egypt	April 2014	2014 Championships	Cairo, Egypt	
Discus throw	51.58 m	Ritaj Salem Essayah	Libya	May 2016	2016 Championships	Tlemcen, Algeria	
Hammer throw	59.46 m	Esraa Mohamed Mustfa	Egypt	April 2014	2014 Championships	Cairo, Egypt	
Javelin throw	48.54 m	Shirine Chaabene	Egypt	20 April 2018	2018 Championships	Amman, Jordan	
Heptathlon	4742 pts h NWI	Noura Ennadi	Morocco	19–20 April 2018	2018 Championships	Amman, Jordan	
Heptathlon	100m H (wind) / High jump / Shot put / 200m (wind) / Long jump (wind) / Javelin / 800m; 14.9h (NWI) / 1.55 m / 8.79 m / 25.03 (NWI) / 5.77 m (NWI) / 26.80 m / 2:28.66						
5000 m walk (track)	24:33.27	Olfa Hamdi	Tunisia	June 2008	2008 Championships	Radès, Tunisia	
10,000 m walk (track)	50:50.80	Oumayma Hsouna	Tunisia	23 May 2022	2022 Championships	Radès, Tunisia	
10 km (road)	47:30.28	Chahinez Al Nasri	Tunisia	May 2012	2012 Championships	Amman, Jordan	
4 × 100 m relay	46.60		Bahrain	May 2016	2016 Championships	Tlemcen, Algeria	
4 × 400 m relay	3:44.84		Sudan	2004	2004 Championships	Damascus, Syria	
