= 2008 Arab Junior Athletics Championships =

13th Arab Junior Athletics Championships
- Dates: 20–23 June
- Host city: Radès, Tunisia
- Events: 44

The 2008 Arab Junior Athletics Championships was the thirteenth edition of the international athletics competition for under-20 athletes from Arab countries. It took place between 20–23 June in Radès, Tunisia – the second time that the country hosted the tournament. A total of 44 athletics events were contested, 22 for men and 22 for women.

The host nation Tunisia topped the medal table with thirteen gold medals among a haul of 45 medals – over a third of the total on offer. Sudan was comfortably the next most successful nation, having eleven gold medals and a total of twenty, and was followed by Egypt on seven golds and ten medals overall. Syria and Bahrain each took three golds, while Qatar was the only other nation to reach double digits with a total of ten medals. Twelve of the thirteen participating nations reached the medal table, with Palestine being the only nation to miss out. Morocco and Algeria, two of the foremost athletics nations of the region, were absent.

Six athletes won multiple individual medals. Jomaa Fayza Omer of Sudan was the athlete of the tournament, as she won the 400 metres, 100 metres hurdles, and 400 metres hurdles titles, was runner-up in the 200 metres, and won a further silver and a gold in the relays with Sudan. Her team mate Amina Bakhit swept the middle-distance events with an 800 metres/1500 metres/3000 metres triple, and also shared in the relay medals. Another Sudanese, Osman Yahia Omar, claimed an 800/1500 m double on the men's side. There were doubles in both the men's and women's short sprints, with Emirati Omar Juma Al-Salfa and Syria's Ghofrane Mohammad taking doubles. Tunisia's Yousra Belkhir claimed an unusual combination of events in the form of the women's pole vault and triple jump.

Javelin thrower Ihab Abdelrahman El Sayed, who broke the championship record in Radès, went on to take a medal at the 2008 World Junior Championships in Athletics two weeks later. Another Egyptian thrower, hammer runner-up Alaa el-Din el-Ashry, was still a junior by the time of the 2010 World Junior Championships in Athletics and reached the podium there. Three Arab junior athletes were still in the youth category and went on to win a medal at the 2009 World Youth Championships in Athletics: Awad El Karim Makki, Mohamed Ahmed Al Mannai and Hamid Mansoor.

== Medal summary ==
=== Men ===
Event	Gold		Silver		Bronze	
100 metres	Omar Juma Al-Salfa (UAE)	10.53	Thamer Nasser Al-Thany (QAT)	10.84	Fares Al-Sharahily (KSA)	10.87
200 metres	Omar Juma Al-Salfa (UAE)	21.14	Adel Al-Essiri (KSA)	21.29	Awad El Karim Makki (SUD)	21.62
400 metres	Awad El Karim Makki (SUD)	47.48	Nidhal Abbassi (TUN)	48.93	Jassem Walid Abdallah Elas (KUW)	48.71
800 metres	Osman Yahia Omar (SUD)	1:52.71	Mosab Abdulrahman Belala (QAT)	1:53.16	Mohamed Souissi (TUN)	1:53.71
1500 metres	Osman Yahia Omar (SUD)	3:45.75	Charles Lazbit Koech (QAT)	3:47.59	Hamza Ben Salah (TUN)	3:48.59
5000 metres	Charles Lazbit Koech (QAT)	15:6.98	Bilel El Aloui (TUN)	15:18.08	Ahmed Mohamed Kallel (LBA)	15:21.02
10,000 metres	Majed Saleh Ibrahim (BHR)	30:24.40	Bilel El Aloui (TUN)	32:14.35	Bilel Ferjani (TUN)	32:25.86
110 metres hurdles	Abdulaziz Al-Mandeel (KUW)	13.78 CR	Awned Ushana (SYR)	14.53	Mohamed Yahia Al-Sharahily (KSA)	14.66
400 metres hurdles	Jassem Walid Abdallah Elas (KUW)	52.2	Hamed Ali Al Bishi (KSA)	52.6	Mutawakil Yunes (SUD)	52.7
3000 metres steeplechase	Majed Saleh Ibrahim (BHR)	8:53.93	Hassen Najjar Abdelkarim (JOR)	9:26.24	Marouane Majed (TUN)	9:29.09
4 × 100 m relay	Saudi Arabia (KSA); Hamed Ali Al Bishi; Fares Al-Sharahily; Mohamed Shunanat; Adel Al-Essiri	41.41	Tunisia (TUN); M.Amin Ben Abdelaziz; Sami Ayed; Oussama Ben Gouider; Ghassan Fersi; Ala Eddine Ben Hassine; Kais Jerbi	42.39	Oman (OMN); Ahmed Al Morji; Abdelaziz Al Ayoubi; Nasser Khamis Al Sayabi; Jamel Al Rabhi; Yakoub Al Ayoubi	43.37
4 × 400 m relay	Sudan (SUD); Nader Abdelrahman; Osman Yahia Omar; Awad El Karim Makki; Mutawakil Yunes	3:15.35	Tunisia (TUN); Nidhal Abbassi; Sassi Idriss; Tarek Jdey; Marouane Chehibi; Hamza Azzouz	3:20.42	Qatar (QAT); Jamel Hassi; Aboubaker Al Hadj; Selmane Ahmed Al Manai; Moussab Bellala	3:20.86
10 km walk	Hédi Teraoui (TUN)	42:49.22 CR	Maher Zidane (SYR)	50:43.4	Only two finishers^{[nb1]}	
High jump	Karim Samir Lotfy (EGY)	2.19 m CR	Salman Ahmed El Mannaï (QAT)	2.11 m	Osman Abdelmajid Al Rabeh (KUW)	2.06 m
Pole vault	Mohamed Chenouf (TUN)	4.70 m	Duaij Khalifa Al-Sakr (KSA)	4.60 m	Khaled Abahnini (TUN)	4.40 m
Long jump	Alaa Eddine Ben Hassine (TUN)	7.43 m	Mubarak Jassef Al Jasser (KSA)	7.38 m	Mohamed Khalifa Al Amari (LBA)	6.92 m
Triple jump	Sergueï Vladimir (BHR)	15.56 m	Mubarak Jassef Al Jasser (KSA)	15.50 m	Mohamed Khalifa Al Amari (LBA)	14.87 m
Shot put (6 kg)	Mohamed Béchir Ben Rehouma (TUN)	17.22 m	Ahmed Ali Hassen Mohamed (UAE)	16.14 m	Ibrahim Abdallah Al Foudry (KUW)	15.98 m
Discus throw (1.7 kg)	Hamid Mansoor (SYR)	56.77 m	Mohamed Ali Mejri (TUN)	51.08 m	Ibrahim Abdallah Al Foudry (KUW)	50.85 m
Hammer throw (6 kg)	Khalid Shawki Mahmood (EGY)	69.64 m	Alaa el-Din el-Ashry (EGY)	65.53 m	Ada Amer Ahmed Hawafdha (QAT)	57.68 m
Javelin throw (800 g)	Ihab Abdelrahman El Sayed (EGY)	73.67 m CR	Badr Nasser Ennaqaoui (KUW)	56.80 m	Jaber Jassem El Mohannadi (QAT)	53.33 m
Decathlon	Mohamed Ahmed Al Mannai (QAT)	6619 pts	Saad Fahd Al Bishi (KSA)	6599 pts	Ahmed Ben Abdallah Mekbali (OMN)	5803 pts

- ^{nb1} There were four starters in the men's 10,000 m walk, but both Jebril Rahmet Khan and Maher Ben Halima were disqualified.

=== Women ===
Event	Gold		Silver		Bronze	
100 metres	Ghofrane Mohammad (SYR)	12.04	Saoussen Dallagi (TUN)	12.55	Safa Abdelhamid Ibrahim (SUD)	12.59
200 metres	Ghofrane Mohammad (SYR)	24.39	Jomaa Fayza Omer (SUD)	25.01	Abir Barkaoui (TUN)	25.33
400 metres	Jomaa Fayza Omer (SUD)	56.62	Nouha Baklouti (TUN)	57.39	Safa Abdelhamid Ibrahim (SUD)	58.75
800 metres	Amina Bakhit (SUD)	2:16.22	Ihsen Jibril (SUD)	2:17.06	Haifa Tarchoun (TUN)	2:18.39
1500 metres	Amina Bakhit (SUD)	4:39.30	Ihsen Jibril (SUD)	4:41.12	Safa Jemmali (TUN)	4:42.14
3000 metres	Amina Bakhit (SUD)	9:38.95	Ihsen Jibril (SUD)	9:40.60	Amira Saghraoui (TUN)	9:49.33
5000 metres	Maroua Zaidi (TUN)	17:40.49	Monia Zidi (TUN)	18:37.67	Rasha Ayub (JOR)	19:44.20
100 metres hurdles	Jomaa Fayza Omer (SUD)	14.81	Selma Abdelhamid (TUN)	15.03	Samar Zina (TUN)	15.11
400 metres hurdles	Jomaa Fayza Omer (SUD)	62.13	Nouha Baklouti (TUN)	63.82	Radhia Ayadi (TUN)	64.29
3000 metres steeplechase	Raouia Aissaoui (TUN)	11:00.62	Monia Zidi (TUN)	11:17.06	Olaa Khalifa (JOR)	11:45.78
4 × 100 m relay	Tunisia (TUN); Aya Lakhal; Saoussen Dallagi; Nour Elhouda Ben Saïd; Hafsia Hmidi	48.66	Sudan (SUD); Safa Abdelhamid; Alouia Maki; Ihsan Jebril; Jomaa Fayza Omer	53.77	Syria (SYR); Farah Della; Ourouba Ammou; Rihem Chiha; Ghofrane Mohammad	57.16
4 × 400 m relay	Sudan (SUD); Safa Abdelhamid; Ihsen Jebril; Amina Bakhit; Jomaa Fayza Omer	3:48.52	Tunisia (TUN); Nouha Baklouti; Radhia Ayadi; Yousra Belkhir; Abir Barkaoui	3:51.05	Jordan (JOR); Rania Al Kabali; Olaa Khalifa; Rasha Ayub; Esra Youssef	4:35.56
5000 m race walk	Olfa Hamdi (TUN)	24:33.27 CR	Oruba Al-Ammou (SYR)	25:13.11	Imène Abdallah (TUN)	29:13.70
High jump	Basant Musaad Mohammad (EGY)	1.67 m	Mariem Akrimi (TUN)	1.65 m	Rahma Miled (TUN)	1.61 m
Pole vault	Yousra Belkhir (TUN)	3.20 m	Yasmeene Ali Hassen (EGY)	3.10 m	Amel Smaâli (TUN)	2.90 m
Long jump	Samar Zina (TUN)	5.36 m	Fatma Hassen Al Harbi (BHR)	5.28 m	Marah Della (SYR)	5.24 m
Triple jump	Yousra Belkhir (TUN)	12.34 m	Fatma Ben Hammadi (TUN)	12.21 m	Fatma Hassen Al Harbi (BHR)	11.28 m
Shot put (4 kg)	Oulaa Mohamed Atiya (EGY)	13.44 m	Sihem Marrakchi (TUN)	12.62 m	Asma Khalifa Abu Ali (BHR)	10.06 m
Discus throw (1 kg)	Ilhem Essayed Hassen (EGY)	43.79 m	Khouloud Babay (TUN)	40.17 m	Ibtihel Abboud (LBA)	38.50 m
Javelin throw (600 g)	Sihem Marrakchi (TUN)	41.74 m	Ibtihel Abboud (LBA)	31.39 m	Sheikha Sakr Eddussary (QAT)	25.47 m
Hammer throw (4 kg)	Rana Ahmad Taha (EGY)	53.36 m CR	Ilhem Essayed Hassen (EGY)	42.50 m	Only two finishers^{[nb2]}	
Heptathlon	Niouar Jerbi (TUN)	4296 pts	Rania Shokri El-Kubaly (JOR)	4136 pts	Rabâa Rezgui (TUN)	3314 pts

- ^{nb2} A third competitor in the women's hammer throw, Tunisia's Najet Ben Chikha, failed to record a valid mark.

== Medal table ==
* Host nation (Tunisia)

Rank	Nation	Gold	Silver	Bronze	Total
1	Tunisia*	13	17	15	45
2	Sudan	11	5	4	20
3	Egypt	7	3	0	10
4	Syria	3	3	2	8
5	Bahrain	3	1	2	6
6	Qatar	2	4	4	10
7	Kuwait	2	1	4	7
8	United Arab Emirates	2	1	0	3
9	Saudi Arabia	1	6	2	9
10	Jordan	0	2	3	5
11	Libya	0	1	4	5
12	Oman	0	0	2	2
Totals (12 entries)		44	44	42	130
