= 2022 Arab U20 Athletics Championships =

- Dates: 22–26 May
- Host city: Radès, Tunisia
- Venue: Radès Olympic Athletics Stadium
- Events: 39
- Participation: 147 athletes from 15 nations

The 2022 Arab U20 Athletics Championships was the nineteenth edition of the international athletics competition for under-20 athletes from Arab countries. It took place from 22 to 26 May at the Radès Olympic Athletics Stadium in Radès, Tunisia.

It was the first time that Radés hosted the event. A total of 39 athletics events were contested. Egypt won the most medals at the championships.

== Medal summary ==
=== Men ===
Event	Gold		Silver		Bronze	
100m	Saeed al Sahoti; Qatar	10.69	Omar Ebrahim; Bahrain	10.78	Adam Abdul Abdul; Algeria	10.91
200m	Yusuf Ali Abbas; Bahrain	21.07	Amr Hany Soliman; Egypt	21.51	Adam Abdul Abdul; Algeria	21.73
400m	Yusuf Ali Abbas; Bahrain	45.87	Ismail Doudai Abakar; Qatar	46.90	Hussein Ibrahim Issaka; Qatar	47.44
800m	Heithem Chenitef; Algeria	1:48.75	Bader Alsweed; Kuwait	1:48.84	Abdo-Razak Hassan; Djibouti	1:48.90
1500m	Hassan Idleh Diraneh; Djibouti	3:44.67	Abdo-Razak Hassan; Djibouti	3:44.67	Bader Alsweed; Kuwait	3:46.30
3000m	Mohammed Aataati; Morocco	8:08.84	Hassan Idleh Diraneh; Djibouti	8:09.65	Abdikani Mohamed Hamid; Bahrain	8:10.13
5000m	Abdikani Mohamed Hamid; Bahrain	14:11.23	Abderrahmane Daoud; Algeria	14:22.14	Mohammed Aataati; Morocco	14:22.47
110mH (0.99)	Kherrafi Moncif; Algeria	13.99	Mohammed Najah Al-Shiblawi; Iraq	14.02	Oumar Doudai Abakar; Qatar	14.43
400mH	Ismail Doudai Abakar; Qatar	51.56	Ahmed Jamal Aldirawi; Iraq	52.43	Yahia Nahedh; Tunisia	53.26
3000mSC	Salaheddine Ben Yazide; Morocco	8:52.41	Abderrahmane Daoud; Algeria	8:54.52	Hamse Dhabar; Brunei	9:01.72
High Jump	Ahmed Abdullah Al-Taruti; Saudi Arabia	2.03 m	Nameer al Busaidi; Oman	2.00 m	Omar Arnaout; Lebanon	2.00 m
Pole Vault	Tamer Ashraf Mohamed; Egypt	4.80 m	Kareem Mohamed Mahmoud Hussein; Egypt	4.30 m		
Long Jump	Zeyad Elhussein Elsayed Mohamed; Egypt	7.27 m	Jamal Eddine Hdily; Morocco	7.03 m	Mohammed Sami Al-Yami; Saudi Arabia	6.97 m
Triple Jump	Yassin Esam Elsayed; Egypt	15.36 m	Ahmed Ayoub ben Naadja; Algeria	14.69 m	Omar Musa ALi Mohamed; Bahrain	14.68 m
Shot Put (6 kg)	Yousef Mahmod Ali Bakhit Ahmad; Egypt	18.02 m	Hussain Al-Tamimi; Kuwait	17.38 m	Ashraf Mohamed Ismael Mulsim; Egypt	16.40 m
Discus Throw (1,75 kg)	Ahmed Hamdi Mahmoud; Egypt	53.63 m	Yousef Mahmod Ali Bakhit Ahmad; Egypt	49.59 m	Mohamed Ahmed Qassem; Iraq	48.69 m
Hammer Throw (6 kg)	Omar Hamdy Mahmoud Abdelhay; Egypt	64.44 m	Basel Mohamed Ahmed; Egypt	61.75 m	Othman Al-Hailoufi; Morocco	60.43 m
Javelin Throw	Ahmed Sameh Mohamed Hussein; Egypt	69.26 m	Ahmed Bahgat Abdulbaset Hasan; Egypt	61.88 m		
10,000m Race Walk	Oussama Farhat; Tunisia	43:00.32	Ahmed Mohamed Hanafi; Egypt	43:26.18	Ismail Benhammouda; Algeria	43:36.15
Decathlon - U20	Abdulrahman Khaled Sayed Salah; Egypt	5691	Mohammed Rashid Al-Subaie; Saudi Arabia	6710		

=== Women ===
Event	Gold		Silver		Bronze	
100m	Layla Kamal; Bahrain	11.97	Zenab Moussa Ali Mahamat; Bahrain	12.07	Salma Lehlali; Morocco	12.28
200m	Layla Kamal; Bahrain	24.85	Awtif Imoleayo Ahmed; Bahrain	25.12	Lina Maria Guedal; Algeria	25.34
400m	Zenab Moussa Ali Mahamat; Bahrain	53.42	Salma Lehlali; Morocco	54.45	Awtif Imoleayo Ahmed; Bahrain	56.35
800m	Sanae Hasnaoui; Morocco	2:08.83	Lamiae Mamouni; Morocco	2:09.83	Roukia Mouici; Algeria	2:10.59
1500m	Sanae Hasnaoui; Morocco	4:23.67	Roukia Mouici; Algeria	4:25.27	Fatima Aafir; Morocco	4:26.66
3000m	Fatima Aafir; Morocco	9:56.43	Fatima al Zahra Birdaha; Morocco	10:08.26	Eya Ouerghi; Tunisia	10:11.29
5000m	Rihab Dhahri; Tunisia	17:53.71	Khadija Ennasri; Morocco	17:53.91	Fatima al Zahra Birdaha; Morocco	17:56.95
100mH	Jude Ahmed Maher; Egypt	14.56	Malak Ayman Rashwan; Egypt	14.66	Eya Alrahya; Syria	14.67
400mH	Eya Alrahya; Syria	1:03.10	Nour Rahou; Algeria	1:03.15	Mariem Hdidi; Tunisia	1:04.31
3000mSC	Rihab Dhahri; Tunisia	10:03.15	Khadija Ennasri; Morocco	10:08.36	Loubna Lahdar; Morocco	11:15.00
High Jump	Darina Hadil Rezik; Algeria	1.70 m				
Pole Vault	Shahd Mohamed Fouad Mohamed; Egypt	3.50 m				
Long Jump	Malak Ayman Rashwan; Egypt	5.56 m	Sara Maged Mohamed; Egypt	5.30 m	Leticia Waeeba; Algeria	5.29 m
Triple Jump	Wissal Harkas; Algeria	12.50 m	Salma Abdulhamid Hamed; Egypt	12.10 m	Leticia Waeeba; Algeria	12.04 m
Shot Put	Manat Allah Alsyd Hilmi; Egypt	13.37 m	Ghofrane Hamdi; Tunisia	11.31 m		
Hammer Throw	Sinda Garma; Tunisia	53.59 m	Nada Soliman Abdelnaby; Egypt	51.99 m	Zeina Mohamed Farouk; Egypt	50.32 m
Javelin Throw	Rola Sameh Raafat; Egypt	43.39 m	Chahinez el Said Wefki; Egypt	43.24 m		
10,000m Race Walk	Oumayma Hsouna; Tunisia	50:50.80	Maysaa Boughdir; Tunisia	53:01.10	Ilhem Mansouri; Algeria	56:13.50

== Medal table ==
Host nation

Rank	Nation	Gold	Silver	Bronze	Total
1	Egypt (EGY)	13	11	2	26
2	Bahrain (BHN)	6	3	4	13
3	Morocco (MAR)	5	6	6	17
4	Tunisia (TUN)*	5	1	3	9
5	Algeria (ALG)	4	5	9	18
6	Qatar (QAT)	2	1	2	5
7	Saudi Arabia (KSA)	2	0	0	2
8	Djibouti (DJI)	1	2	1	4
9	Syria (SYR)	1	0	1	2
10	Iraq (IRQ)	0	2	1	3
10	Kuwait (KUW)	0	2	1	3
12	Oman (OMA)	0	1	0	1
13	Lebanon (LBN)	0	0	1	1
Totals (13 entries)		39	34	31	104
