= 1990 Arab Junior Athletics Championships =

4th Arab Junior Athletics Championships
- Host city: Latakia, Syria
- Events: 18
- Participation: 3 nations

The 1990 Arab Junior Athletics Championships was the fourth edition of the international athletics competition for under-20 athletes from Arab countries. It took place in Latakia, Syria. Only women competed at this edition of the competition in a programme containing only 18 athletics events. International participation was very limited, with Egypt and Syria providing all but three of the medallists. Palestine was the only other competing nation.

Egypt topped the medal table with ten gold medals, followed by the hosts Syria with six golds. Palestine's sole individual medals came in the 5000 m walk, in which its two athletes were the only finishers. Sisters Rania Mohamed Ali and Ridha Mohamed Ali each won three gold medals in the track events for Egypt. Their compatriot Shirin Mohamed Kheiri El Atrabi became the third woman to complete a 100 metres hurdles and heptathlon double, following in the footsteps of Huda Hashem Ismail and Yasmina Azzizi. Reflecting the diminished participation, the marks set at this competition were of a much lower standard than in previous years.

== Medal summary ==
Event	Gold		Silver		Bronze	
100 metres	Nawal Zayoud (SYR)	13.25	Soumaya Youhanoun (SYR)	13.27	Sabrine Ibrahim (EGY)	13.89
200 metres	Rania Mohamed Ali (EGY)	26.71	Nawal Zayoud (SYR)	26.82	Rola Sannoufi (SYR)	27.50
400 metres	Ridha Mohamed Ali (EGY)	57.8	Rola Sannoufi (SYR)	60.8	Ibtissam Fathi Hassan (EGY)	61.3
800 metres	Rania Mohamed Ali (EGY)	2:19.24	Rola Sannoufi (SYR)	2:20.22	Ibtissam Fathi Hassan (EGY)	2:28.01
1500 metres	Ridha Mohamed Ali (EGY)	4:59.20	Mirvat Baas (SYR)	5:00.30	Ahad Hussein (SYR)	5:00.80
3000 metres	Ridha Mohamed Ali (EGY)	10:54.72	Mirvat Baas (SYR)	10:55.81	Muna Jamal (EGY)	11:00.42
10,000 metres	Ahlam Homsi (SYR)	43:53.6	Randa Saeed (SYR)	44:26.3	Alia Haj (EGY)	45:34.2
100 m hurdles	Shirin Mohamed Kheiri El Atrabi (EGY)	16.87	Khola Awad (SYR)	19.94	Alia Haj (EGY)	21.69
400 m hurdles	Rania Mohamed Ali (EGY)	63.93	Nariman Sheikh (SYR)	76.00	Khola Awad (SYR)	76.62
4×100 m relay	Unknown	???	Unknown	???	Unknown	???
4×400 m relay	Egypt (EGY)	4:05.17	Syria (SYR)	4:12.82	Palestine (PLE)	5:34.53
5000 m walk	Nisrine Abdullah (PLE)	31:22.31	Alia Haj (PLE)	32:38.0	Only two finishers	
High jump	Hala Saka (SYR)	1.50 m	Shirin Mohamed Kheiri El Atrabi (EGY)	1.47 m	Haifa Abbas (SYR)	1.44 m
Long jump	Hala Saka (SYR)	5.18 m	Soumaya Youhanoun (SYR)	4.89 m	Shirin Mohamed Kheiri El Atrabi (EGY)	4.46 m
Shot put	Lina Hazouri (SYR)	11.41 m	Hiba Meshili Abu Zaghari (EGY)	11.37 m	Shaala Tarek (SYR)	11.17 m
Discus throw	Lina Hazouri (SYR)	45.00 m CR	Hiba Meshili Abu Zaghari (EGY)	35.98 m	Shaala Tarek (SYR)	23.92 m
Javelin throw	Maya Ali Abdessamad (EGY)	38.56 m	Amira Sayed Madhar (EGY)	34.74 m	Fidila Daoud (SYR)	33.94 m
Heptathlon	Shirin Mohamed Kheiri El Atrabi (EGY)	3569 pts	Hala Saka (SYR)	3305 pts	Muna Jamal (EGY)	2710 pts

== Medal table ==
Rank	Nation	Gold	Silver	Bronze	Total
1	Egypt (EGY)	10	4	8	22
2	Syria (SYR)	6	12	7	25
3	Palestine (PLE)	1	1	1	3
Totals (3 entries)		17	17	16	50
