= 2010 Arab Junior Athletics Championships =

14th Arab Junior Athletics Championships
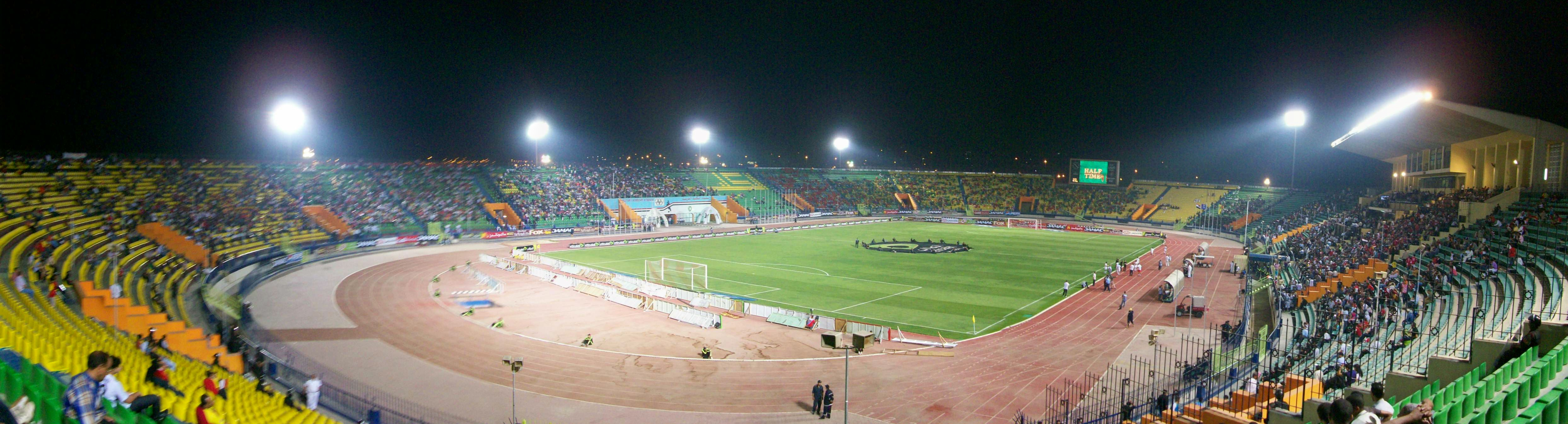
- The host stadium
- Dates: 5–8 May
- Host city: Cairo, Egypt
- Venue: Cairo Military Academy Stadium
- Events: 44

The 2010 Arab Junior Athletics Championships was the fourteenth edition of the international athletics competition for under-20 athletes from Arab countries. It took place between 5–8 May at Cairo Military Academy Stadium in Cairo, Egypt. It was the fourth time that the event was held in the Egyptian capital. A total of 44 athletics events were contested, 22 for men and 22 for women.

The host nation Egypt comfortably topped the medal table with sixteen gold medals in a haul of 40. Morocco has the next highest medal count with 18, though only three of them gold. Tunisia and Bahrain shared the honour of second highest number of gold medals at five, with Tunisia taking the runner-up spot with its tally of 12 medals. A total of fourteen nations reached the medal table (this included a rare medal for Yemen).

Among the participants was Mutaz Essa Barshim, who won the high jump in an Arab junior record and would win an Olympic medal just two years later. Moroccan-born athlete Mohamad Al-Garni won the men's 800 metres and 1500 metres – events which he also won at the 2010 Asian Junior Athletics Championships that same year.

Gulustan Mahmood, who later won medals for Iraq at the 2011 Asian Athletics Championships (annulled due to doping). In Cairo she won the 400 metres and was 200 metres runner-up Another future Asian champion scored a double at the competition – Ethiopian-born Tejitu Daba won the long-distance double for Bahrain. Asma Oussam Yusuf Mohamed was another to win two golds, taking a short sprint double, and she also won the 4 × 100 metres relay with Egypt.

== Medal summary ==
=== Men ===
Event	Gold		Silver		Bronze	
100 metres	Ayman Al Jassem (IRQ)	10.72	Eid Abdullah Alkuwari (QAT)	10.89	Khalifa Abdallah Al Qattan (KUW)	10.93
200 metres	Mohamed Jassem Mohamed (BHR)	21.42	Mohamed Hassan (IRQ)	21.52	Mohamed Sayed Abulkhair (EGY)	21.55
400 metres	Awad El Karim Makki (SUD)	46.98	Mohamed Sayed Abulkhair (EGY)	47.19	Mohamed Hassan (IRQ)	47.23
800 metres	Mohamad Al-Garni (QAT)	1:47.98	Mohamed Bensghir (MAR)	1:48.13	Ahmed Abdelkarim Farag (EGY)	1:49.00
1500 metres	Mohamad Al-Garni (QAT)	3:39.74 CR	Mohamed Bensghir (MAR)	3:43.23	Abdelhedi Labaa (MAR)	3:43.46
5000 metres	Hicham Sakine (MAR)	14:29.24	Abdelmuneim Yahya (SUD)	14:31.60	Adam Abdallah Haroun (SUD)	14:32.59
10,000 metres	Edwin Kimurer (BHR)	31:55.50	Adam Abdallah Haroun (SUD)	32:03.96	Ali Jadasha (YEM)	33:09.39
110 m hurdles	Nadir Ahmed Al-Khair (KSA)	14.08	Seif Sabah Khairallah (QAT)	14.22	Omar Samir (IRQ)	14.45
400 m hurdles	Youssef Mohamed Karam (KUW)	51.85	Zied Azizi (TUN)	51.90	Ali Ayadh Al-Ghamdi (KSA)	52.98
3000 m steeplechase	Abdallah Dacha (MAR)	9:19.59	Isaac Kemboi (BHR)	9:20.20	Abdelfattah Zaki Abdelhalim (EGY)	9:20.51
4 × 100 m relay	Iraq (IRQ)	40.9	Saudi Arabia (KSA)	41.0	Bahrain (BHR)	41.6
4 × 400 m relay	Sudan (SUD)	3:11.48	Iraq (IRQ)	3:12.66	Egypt (EGY)	3:16.66
10 km walk	Ahmed Hamada Kamel (EGY)	45:29.6	Jaouher bel hadj rhouma (TUN)	46:10.9	Amir Razak Abid (IRQ)	46:18.3
High jump	Mutaz Essa Barshim (QAT)	2.23 m CR	Nawaf Ahmed Al Yami (KSA)	2.14 m	Khalid Saied Al Sairy (QAT)	2.08 m
Pole vault	Sami Belrehaiem (TUN)	4.70 m	Badr Hashim Khamis (QAT)	4.70 m	Salah Farid El Shamaly (KUW)	4.50 m
Long jump	Marouane Mansour (TUN)	7.43 m	Hashem Nizar Al Sharaf (KSA)	7.21 m	Faraj Salah Madid (KUW)	7.10 m
Triple jump	Ahmed Salama Abdelhafidh (EGY)	15.53 m	Abdallah Al Yuha (KUW)	15.42 m	Mohamed Ahmed Sarhan (EGY)	15.08 m
Shot put	Hishem Abdelhamid Abdelaziz (EGY)	18.56 m	Khalid Ahmed Attia (EGY)	17.74 m	Musab Aysha (SYR)	17.52 m
Discus throw	Essa Al-Zenkawi (KUW)	57.30 m	Hamid Mansoor (SYR)	57.14 m	Abdelmeneim Mohamed El Sayed (EGY)	48.03 m
Hammer throw	Alaa el-Din el-Ashry (EGY)	75.51 m	Islam Ahmed Taha (EGY)	65.30 m	Abdelhamid Al-Nasser (KUW)	59.43 m
Javelin throw	Ahmed Samir Mohamed (EGY)	67.99 m	Fadl Fayez Saeed (EGY)	64.96 m	Mkarem Mahameed (SYR)	64.50 m
Decathlon	Mohamed Ahmed Al Mannai (QAT)	7216 pts CR	Ahmed Saber Ahmed (EGY)	6259 pts	Bydar Dhia Hussein (IRQ)	6133 pts

=== Women ===
Event	Gold		Silver		Bronze	
100 metres	Asma Oussam Yusuf Mohamed (EGY)	12.20	Aziza Sebty (LIB)	12.40	Eya Lakhal (TUN)	12.49
200 metres	Asma Oussam Yusuf Mohamed (EGY)	24.60	Gulustan Mahmood (IRQ)	24.67	Ilham Salmi (MAR)	25.54
400 metres	Gulustan Mahmood (IRQ)	54.35	Ilham Salmi (MAR)	57.04	Amna Abkar (SUD)	58.33
800 metres	Alawia Maki (SUD)	2:08.51 CR	Jamila Shaoumi (BHR)	2:09.06	Manel Bahraoui (MAR)	2:10.42
1500 metres	Jamila Shaoumi (BHR)	4:18.26 CR	Mariem Abdallah Mubarak (UAE)	4:24.26	Hanane Falouj (MAR)	4:24.69
3000 metres	Tejitu Daba (BHR)	9:14.07 CR	Alia Saeed Mohammed (UAE)	9:27.46	Hayat Alaoui (MAR)	10:00.24
5000 metres	Tejitu Daba (BHR)	16:49.04	Fatiha Asmid (MAR)	17:54.58	Hayat Alaoui (MAR)	17:56.00
100 m hurdles	Selma Imam Abulhassan (EGY)	14.68	Olaa Sabri Sayed (EGY)	15.36	Ahlem Oussaid (MAR)	15.90
400 m hurdles	Abir Barkaoui (TUN)	60.58	Shaima Hisham Fouad (EGY)	62.30	Tasabih Alsayed (SUD)	62.60
3000 m steeplechase	Mabrouka Mansouri (TUN)	11:20.07	Marwa Nasri (TUN)	11:25.58	Olaa Khalifa (JOR)	11:25.85
4 × 100 m relay	Egypt (EGY)	48.47	Morocco (MAR)	49.34	Tunisia (TUN)	50.46
4 × 400 m relay	Sudan (SUD)	3:50.02	Morocco (MAR)	3:51.92	Tunisia (TUN)	3:56.24
10 km walk	Oruba Al-Ammou (SYR)	50:32.00	Sabrine Sellimi (TUN)	53:34.06	Basant Ramadhan Hassan (EGY)	53:37.02
High jump	Basant Musaad Mohammad (EGY)	1.76 m CR	Donia Mani (MAR)	1.63 m	Maryam Al Ansari (BHR)	1.56 m
Pole vault	Dina Ahmed Abdelmeneim (EGY)	3.40 m =CR	Rihem Shiha (SYR)	2.90 m	Marina Samer Helmy (EGY)	2.80 m
Long jump	Yusra Yahya Mahmoud (EGY)	5.89 m	Suhaila Helmi Aljabrouni (EGY)	5.69 m	Jihad Bakhechi (MAR)	5.56 m
Triple jump	Jihad Bakhechi (MAR)	12.67 m	Suhaila Helmi Aljabrouni (EGY)	12.44 m	Asmaa Mohammad Gharib (EGY)	12.27 m
Shot put	Fadia Saad Ibrahim (EGY)	12.83 m	Basant Mahmoud Mohamed (EGY)	12.12 m	Rim Gaïeche (TUN)	11.46 m
Discus throw	Rim Gaïeche (TUN)	44.12 m	Dhuha Mohamed Atiya (EGY)	42.12 m	Fadiya Saad Ibrahim (EGY)	39.01 m
Javelin throw	Nuha Abul Futooh (EGY)	39.15 m	Radhwa Hamdi Kamal (EGY)	39.06 m	Hela Ghia (SYR)	32.81 m
Hammer throw	Nihel Kamel Fahmy (EGY)	56.57 m CR	Rana Ahmad Taha (EGY)	55.39 m	Liza Saleh (SYR)	40.93 m
Heptathlon	Radhwa Fathy Hares (EGY)	4492 pts	Wediane Mokhtar Abdelhamid (EGY)	4414 pts	Rania Shokri El-Kubaly (JOR)	4272 pts

== Medal table ==
Rank	Nation	Gold	Silver	Bronze	Total
1	Egypt (EGY)	16	14	10	40
2	Tunisia (TUN)	5	3	4	12
3	Bahrain (BHR)	5	2	2	9
4	Qatar (QAT)	4	3	1	8
5	Sudan (SUD)	4	2	3	9
6	Morocco (MAR)	3	7	8	18
7	Iraq (IRQ)	3	3	4	10
8	Kuwait (KUW)	2	1	4	7
9	Syria (SYR)	1	3	4	8
10	Saudi Arabia (KSA)	1	3	1	5
11	United Arab Emirates (UAE)	0	2	0	2
12	Lebanon (LIB)	0	1	0	1
13	Jordan (JOR)	0	0	2	2
14	Yemen (YEM)	0	0	1	1
Totals (14 entries)		44	44	44	132
