= 2002 Arab Junior Athletics Championships =

10th Arab Junior Athletics Championships
- Host city: Cairo, Egypt
- Events: 43

The 2002 Arab Junior Athletics Championships was the tenth edition of the international athletics competition for under-20 athletes from Arab countries. It took place in Cairo, Egypt – the city hosted the tournament once before in 1986. A total of 43 athletics events were contested, 22 for men and 21 for women. After an absence in 2000, regional powers Morocco, Algeria and Qatar all returned to the tournament.

Morocco topped the table with twelve gold medals, followed by Egypt which won eight titles. Tunisia and Saudi Arabia each won six medals, with Tunisia mainly having success in women's events and Saudi Arabia winning only men's medals. A women's pole vault was added to the programme, leaving just the steeplechase as the remaining event contested by men but not women. Junior implements were used in the throws events for the first time.

Morocco's Yassine Bensghir completed a men's middle-distance double and was the World Junior Champion that same year. Ismail Ahmed Ismail was third to him in the 800 metres, but went on to much greater success as a senior, winning Sudan's first Olympic medal in 2008. The sprints saw the rise of Yahya Habeeb and Yahya Al-Ghahes of Saudi Arabia (both future Asian champions). The men's throws saw the emergence of a new generation of athletes who would dominate regionally: Sultan Al-Hebshi and Ali Al-Zinkawi later won Asian titles in their disciplines, while the Egyptian trio of Yasser Ibrahim Farag, Omar Ahmed El Ghazaly and Mohsen Mohamed Anani later won gold medals at the African Championships in Athletics in the shot put, discus and hammer throw, respectively.

In women's events, sprint medallists Muna Jabir Adam and Gretta Taslakian each later became continental medallists in their specialities. Mariem Alaoui Selsouli was a medallist in both long-distance events and later won medals at the IAAF World Indoor Championships.

== Medal summary ==
=== Men ===
Event	Gold		Silver		Bronze	
100 metres	Mustafa Taha Hussein (EGY)	10.62	Yahya Habeeb (KSA)	10.63	Yahya Al-Ghahes (KSA)	10.68
200 metres	Ahmed Fayaz Al-Dosari (KSA)	21.32	Musbah Mubarak (OMN)	21.97	Yahya Al-Ghahes (KSA)	22.02
400 metres	Abdelatif El Ghazaoui (MAR)	46.88	Nagmeldin Ali Abubakr (SUD)	47.81	Ibrahim Al-Hamaidi (KSA)	47.84
800 metres	Yassine Bensghir (MAR)	1:48.23	Mohamed Batani (MAR)	1:48.63	Ismail Ahmed Ismail (SUD)	1:49.55
1500 metres	Yassine Bensghir (MAR)	3:53.10	Mohamed Batani (MAR)	3:54.23	Peter Roko Ashak (SUD)	3:54.75
5000 metres	Essam Gteib (MAR)	14:10.94	Ahmed Abdallah (SUD)	14:16.09	Abdelhalim Zahraoui (MAR)	14:29.55
10,000 metres	Essam Gteib (MAR)	30:39.43	Hamza Hamed (SUD)	30:59.64	Ahmed Abdallah (SUD)	31:47.51
110 m hurdles	Nassim Meziane Ibrahimi (QAT)	14.41	Badr Al-Bouainain (KSA)	14.51	Mohammed Rashid Al-Othman (KUW)	14.62
400 m hurdles	Ibrahim Al-Hamaidi (KSA)	51.46	Idris Abdulaziz Al-Husawi (KSA)	52.26	Badr El Amine (MAR)	52.60
3000 metres steeplechase	Arkangelo Roko (SUD)	8:50.68	Mohamed Ezaldeen Teerab (SUD)	8:57.09	Hussain Hamed Kouri (QAT)	9:08.69
4 × 100 m relay	Saudi Arabia (KSA)	40.35	Oman (OMN)	41.39	Egypt (EGY)	41.61
4 × 400 m relay	Saudi Arabia (KSA)	3:11.99	Sudan (SUD)	3:12.30	Morocco (MAR)	3:15.34
10,000 m walk	Mabrouk Saleh Mohammed (QAT)	46:39.6	Mohamed Abdel Tawab (EGY)	47:52.9	Houcine Soubai (TUN)	48:05.6
High jump	Skander Jaghmoum (TUN)	2.06 m	Jamal Fakhri Al-Qasim (KSA)	2.03 m	Saeed Ali Abbas (UAE)	2.03 m
Pole vault	Ali Maki Hassan Al-Sabbagh (KUW)	4.70 m	Hamed Ali Al-Shehabi (QAT) Mohamed Karbib (MAR)	4.60 m	Not awarded	
Long jump	Ibrahim Faisal Al-Asak (KUW)	7.46 m	Ahmed Sayed Kheirallah (EGY)	7.27 m	Ahmed Fayaz Al-Dosari (KSA)	7.19 m
Triple jump	Azmi Mohammed Sulaiman (QAT)	15.31 m	Mohammed Mujahid Al-Yassin (KSA)	15.20 m	Idir Fellah (ALG)	15.01 m
Shot put	Sultan Al-Hebshi (KSA)	19.48 m CR	Yasser Ibrahim Farag (EGY)	19.23 m	Amin Al-Aradi (KSA)	18.78 m
Discus throw	Omar Ahmed El Ghazaly (EGY)	57.37 m CR	Sultan Al-Dawoodi (KSA)	56.47 m	Yasser Ibrahim Farag (EGY)	53.09 m
Hammer throw	Ali Al-Zinkawi (KUW)	75.89 m CR	Mohsen Mohamed Anani (EGY)	70.04 m	Mohamed El Gamal (EGY)	57.17 m
Javelin throw	El Sayed Wahid Abd El Wahab (EGY)	67.90 m	Hussein Mohamed (EGY)	57.63 m	Marwan Hamza (TUN)	56.26 m
Decathlon	Mohammed Rida Al-Matroud (KSA)	6557 pts	Issa Mufarah Mabrouk (KSA)	6180 pts	Ibrahim Mahmoud (QAT)	5949 pts

=== Women ===
Event	Gold		Silver		Bronze	
100 metres	Ferdaous Essiter (MAR)	12.32	Malika Ali Bacha (ALG)	12.65	Munira Romdhane Al-Saleh (SYR)	12.68
200 metres	Ferdaous Essiter (MAR)	24.88w	Munira Romdhane Al-Saleh (SYR)	25.43w	Muna Jabir Adam (SUD)	25.95w
400 metres	Muna Jabir Adam (SUD)	56.34	Gretta Taslakian (LIB)	56.83	Hanane Sakhia (MAR)	58.15
800 metres	Yousra Jemmali (TUN)	2:09.88 CR	Nawal Baïbi (MAR)	2:11.27	Amal Zétouani (MAR)	2:11.27
1500 metres	Yousra Jemmali (TUN)	4:28.99 CR	Amel Tlili (TUN)	4:30.48	Nawal Baïbi (MAR)	4:31.91
3000 metres	Safa Aïssaoui (TUN)	9:35.99 CR	Hind Roko Musa (SUD)	9:39.69	Mariem Alaoui Selsouli (MAR)	9:41.90
5000 metres	Hind Roko Musa (SUD)	18:04.97	Safa Aïssaoui (TUN)	18:05.54	Mariem Alaoui Selsouli (MAR)	18:09.93
100 m hurdles	Samira Harrouche (ALG)	14.54	Houria El Mohandis (MAR)	14.61	Lamia El Habez (MAR)	14.99
400 m hurdles	Houria El Mohandis (MAR)	62.10	Samira Harrouche (ALG)	64.79	Maha Mohamed Goha (EGY)	65.76
4 × 100 m relay	Morocco (MAR)	49.31	Syria (SYR)	50.05	Algeria (ALG)	50.43
4 × 400 m relay	Tunisia (TUN)	3:52.66 CR	Morocco (MAR)	3:54.40	Sudan (SUD)	3:55.60
5000 m walk	Shaymaa Hamada (EGY)	26:51.2	Iman Din (EGY)	28:41.6	Samah Razak (PLE)	31:32.9
High jump	Monia Wadjini (MAR)	1.73 m CR	Hénane Saade (ALG)	1.66 m	Sarah Bouaoudia (ALG) Amira Khaled Abu El Ata (EGY)	1.60 m
Pole vault	Nesrine Ahmed Imam (EGY)	3.40 m	Asma Kari (TUN) Maha Mohamed Abdel Khalek (EGY)	3.00 m	Not awarded	
Long jump	Saoussan Ouahbi (MAR)	5.96 m CR	Sarah Bouaoudia (ALG)	5.83 m	Nanassi Zaki Saddik (EGY)	5.67 m
Triple jump	Latifa Ezziraoui (MAR)	12.60 m	Muna Khalifa Kamel (EGY)	12.39 m	Najwa Mathlouthi (TUN)	12.10 m
Shot put	Amal Abdel Sabour Mohamed (EGY)	14.20 m CR	Faten Gafsi (TUN)	13.48 m	Ghada Ghezal (TUN)	12.26 m
Discus throw	Faten Gafsi (TUN)	47.00 m CR	Amina El Moudden (MAR)	46.87 m	Shaymaa Ibrahim (EGY)	39.89 m
Hammer throw	Iman Mohamed El Ashri (EGY)	48.64 m CR	Karima Mouhoubi (ALG)	47.18 m	Yasmin Moneim (EGY)	42.50 m
Javelin throw	Hanaa Ramadan Omar (EGY)	47.21 m CR	Safar Mohamed El Mekkawi (EGY)	40.14 m	Ghofrane Shamak (SYR)	39.66 m
Heptathlon	Soraya Mahdioui (ALG)	4555 pts CR	Shirin Salama (EGY)	4141 pts	Hasnia Dardiri (TUN)	4086 pts

== Medal table ==
Rank	Nation	Gold	Silver	Bronze	Total
1	Morocco (MAR)	12	7	9	28
2	Egypt (EGY)	8	10	8	26
3	Saudi Arabia (KSA)	6	7	5	18
4	Tunisia (TUN)	6	4	5	15
5	Sudan (SUD)	3	6	5	14
6	Qatar (QAT)	3	1	2	6
7	Kuwait (KUW)	3	0	1	4
8	Algeria (ALG)	2	5	3	10
9	Syria (SYR)	0	2	2	4
10	Oman (OMN)	0	2	0	2
11	Lebanon (LIB)	0	1	0	1
12	Palestine (PLE)	0	0	1	1
12	United Arab Emirates (UAE)	0	0	1	1
Totals (13 entries)		43	45	42	130
