= 1998 Arab Junior Athletics Championships =

8th Arab Junior Athletics Championships
- Host city: Damascus, Syria
- Events: 41

The 1998 Arab Junior Athletics Championships was the eighth edition of the international athletics competition for under-20 athletes from Arab countries. It took place in Damascus, Syria – the second time the city hosted the tournament, and a fifth hosting for Syria. Damascus also hosted the senior Arab women's championships that year. A total of 41 athletics events were contested, 22 for men and 19 for women. Morocco, a regional power in the sport, did not send a team to the meeting.

The women's 10,000 metres was dropped from the programme; the 3000 metres was restored to partner the new 5000 metres race, in line with the changes at the 1996 World Junior Championships in Athletics. Due to technical limitations, performances in track races were timed to the tenth of a second, rather than the international standard to one hundredth of a second.

Tunisia topped the medal table with thirteen gold medals – all but one of them from the women's competition. Runners-up Qatar took nine gold medals but success was limited to the men's events. Algeria placed third with eight gold medals.

In the men's competition, Fawzi Al-Shammari completed a 200/400 m sprint double – a feat he would repeat at the 2003 Asian Athletics Championships. The long jump champion Hussein Al-Sabee was a global finalist the following year and had won three consecutive Asian titles five years later. Qatari gold medallists Rashid Shafi Al-Dosari (discus) and Ahmad Hassan Moussa (decathlon) would also become Asian champions.

On the women's side Atawef Hamrouni took a 100/200 m sprint double and won senior Arab sprint titles later in her career. The 5000 m champion Souad Aït Salem was the most prominent female athlete to emerge – she would win Arab, African and Mediterranean long-distance titles in the following years. High jump winner Sarah Bouaoudia won that title and the heptathlon title at the 2004 Pan Arab Games.

== Medal summary ==
=== Men ===
Event	Gold		Silver		Bronze	
100 metres	Khalid Yousef Al-Obaidli (QAT)	10.3 =CR	Saad Faraj Al-Shahwani (QAT)	10.5	Akram Bensmira (ALG)	10.6
200 metres	Fawzi Al-Shammari (KUW)	21.0 =CR	Akram Bensmira (ALG)	21.5	Saad Faraj Al-Shahwani (QAT)	21.7
400 metres	Fawzi Al-Shammari (KUW)	45.7 CR	Hamdan Al-Bishi (KSA)	46.2	Amin Gomaa Badawi (EGY)	47.4
800 metres	Abdu Ibrahim Yousef (QAT)	1:52.5	Othman Mohammed Othman (KSA)	1:52.7	Mohammed Khalif Al-Azemi (KUW)	1:53.1
1500 metres	Youcef Jabab (ALG)	3:55.7	Nacer Zein (ALG)	3:55.8	Abu Bakr Rahman (QAT)	3:56.4
5000 metres	Abdulaziz Rahman (SUD)	15:03.2	Abdulrahman Hussain (QAT)	15:05.3	Ahmed Aïssaoui (TUN)	15:10.4
10,000 metres	Abdulaziz Abdulrahman (YEM)	31:24.9	Abdulaziz Rahman (SUD)	31:25.5	Ahmed Aïssaoui (TUN)	31:36.9
110 m hurdles	Badr Saeed Al-Shoumari (KSA)	14.4	Bassem Sami Francis (EGY)	15.0	Nassim Meziane Ibrahimi (QAT)	15.0
400 m hurdles	Issa Hassan (QAT)	51.5	Hani Mourhej (SYR)	51.6	Tahar Ghozali (ALG)	52.1
3000 metres steeplechase	Saeed Moursi (QAT)	9:16.8	Faisal Rabi Al-Nahdi (KSA)	9:21.0	Mouhrez Manaa (TUN)	9:25.9
4×100 m relay	Qatar (QAT)	40.1 CR	Saudi Arabia (KSA)	41.5	Kuwait (KUW)	41.6
4×400 m relay	Kuwait (KUW)	3:14.1	Algeria (ALG)	3:14.7	Saudi Arabia (KSA)	3:15.1
10,000 m walk	Yasser Aboud (SYR)	45:40	Sofiène Azouzi (TUN)	47:10	Issa Barsham (QAT)	48:48
High jump	Mustafa Abdel Jalil Hassanine (EGY)	2.10 m	Omar Al-Fadak (QAT)	2.04 m	Ahmed Salmain (QAT)	2.01 m
Pole vault	Béchir Zaghouani (TUN)	5.00 m	Walid Abu Nasser (EGY)	4.20 m	Mohammed Bakfalouri (SYR)	4.10 m
Long jump	Hussein Al-Sabee (KSA)	7.41 m	Hawari Ali (QAT)	7.23 m	Ibrahim Abdullah Al-Walid (QAT)	7.23 m
Triple jump	Mohammed Hamdi Awadh (QAT)	15.97 m CR	Ibrahim Mohamedin (QAT)	15.87 m	Mohammed Adam Mohammed (KSA)	15.40 m
Shot put	Ahmed Hassan Gholoum (KUW)	16.25 m CR	Mohamed Abdelatif Abu Nasr (EGY)	16.16 m	Ibrahim Moussa (QAT)	16.01 m
Discus throw	Rashid Shafi Al-Dosari (QAT)	50.65 m CR	Waeel Moursi (QAT)	49.43 m	Walid Boudaoui (ALG)	46.57 m
Hammer throw	Nabil Amroune (ALG)	59.12 m	Saber Souid (TUN)	58.09 m	Ahmed Rida Mohamed Abdallah (EGY)	56.30 m
Javelin throw	Ahmed Hamdan (QAT)	65.47 m	Mohammed Ibrahim Al-Khalifa (QAT)	61.44 m	Ali Sawi (EGY)	57.16 m
Decathlon	Ahmad Hassan Moussa (QAT)	6767 pts CR	Amine Hafed (ALG)	6268 pts	Mustafa Taha Hussein (EGY)	6177 pts

=== Women ===
Event	Gold		Silver		Bronze	
100 metres	Awatef Hamrouni (TUN)	12.2	Sarah Arrous (ALG)	12.4	Hamida Hassan (ALG)	12.6
200 metres	Awatef Hamrouni (TUN)	24.7 CR	Houria Moussa (ALG)	25.2	Sarah Arrous (ALG)	25.4
400 metres	Awatef Ben Hassine (TUN)	57.9	Manel Mohsni (TUN)	58.7	Diala Al-Chabi (LIB)	59.7
800 metres	Khadija Touati (ALG)	2:12.7	Abok Choli (SUD)	2:15.9	Ahlam Al-Wardi (SYR)	2:18.1
1500 metres	Khadija Touati (ALG)	4:49.2	Abok Choli (SUD)	4:50.0	Souad Aït Salem (ALG)	4:52.9
3000 metres	Hana Chaouach (TUN)	9:58.1	Walida Suleiman (TUN)	10:09.8	Fouzia Zoutat (ALG)	10:15.8
5000 metres	Souad Aït Salem (ALG)	17:32.1 CR	Hana Chaouach (TUN)	17:42.4	Walida Suleiman (TUN)	18:08.2
100 m hurdles	Naïma Bentahar (ALG)	14.2 CR	Imène Chokeiri (TUN)	14.8	Maha Mohamed Mohamed (EGY)	15.7
400 m hurdles	Imène Chatbri (TUN)	64.0	Maha Mohamed Mohamed (EGY)	68.2	Wallada Kharboutli (SYR)	71.1
4×100 m relay	Algeria (ALG)	49.0	Syria (SYR)	52.7	Jordan (JOR)	54.7
4×400 m relay	Tunisia (TUN)	3:53.2 CR	Syria (SYR)	4:13.0	Jordan (JOR)	4:32.7
5000 m walk	Rania Hammami (TUN)	26:11.4	Faiza Azouzi (ALG)	26:22.3	Dounia Mimouni (ALG)	26:47.6
High jump	Sarah Bouaoudia (ALG)	1.64 m	Sameh Drid (TUN)	1.61 m	Rim Abdullah (SYR)	1.61 m
Long jump	Monia Jelassi (TUN)	5.57 m	Sarah Bouaoudia (ALG)	5.53 m	Hamida Benhocine (ALG)	5.27 m
Triple jump	Monia Jelassi (TUN)	12.65 m	Ilhem Ben Salah (TUN)	12.24 m	Ghada Ismail Mustafa (EGY)	11.72 m
Shot put	Amira Naji Semlawi (EGY)	13.01 m CR	Afef Ben Khaled (TUN)	11.58 m	Salwa Dhouibi (TUN)	11.27 m
Discus throw	Nasrine Dahman (TUN)	40.98 m	Darine Hajabi (TUN)	38.37 m	Amira Naji Semlawi (EGY)	31.34 m
Javelin throw	Salwa Dhouibi (TUN)	41.39 m	Muna Mustafa Youssef (EGY)	40.44 m	Nesrine Mohamed Mohieddin (EGY)	39.53 m
Heptathlon	Manel Bani (TUN)	4197 pts	Hani Jamal Es Sayed (EGY)	4108 pts	Wahiba Fahim (ALG)	3212 pts

== Medal table ==
Rank	Nation	Gold	Silver	Bronze	Total
1	Tunisia (TUN)	13	10	5	28
2	Qatar (QAT)	9	7	7	23
3	Algeria (ALG)	8	8	10	26
4	Kuwait (KUW)	4	0	2	6
5	Egypt (EGY)	2	6	8	16
6	Saudi Arabia (KSA)	2	4	2	8
7	Syria (SYR)	1	3	4	8
8	Sudan (SUD)	1	3	0	4
9	Yemen (YEM)	1	0	0	1
10	Jordan (JOR)	0	0	2	2
11	Lebanon (LIB)	0	0	1	1
Totals (11 entries)		41	41	41	123
