= 1988 Arab Junior Athletics Championships =

3rd Arab Junior Athletics Championships
- Host city: Damascus, Syria
- Events: 41

The 1988 Arab Junior Athletics Championships was the third edition of the international athletics competition for under-20 athletes from Arab countries. It took place in Damascus, Syria – the first time the event was staged in West Asia. A total of 41 athletics events were contested, 23 for men and 18 for women. Morocco, a regional power in the sport, did not send a team. Syria entered for the first time.

Several changes were made to the event programme, bringing it into line with the standard set by the 1988 World Junior Championships in Athletics. The men's 30 km road race was changed to a 20 km distance. The 15 km road walk was replaced by a 10,000 m track walk. The steeplechase distance was also extended from 2000 to 3000 m. Two new women's events were added: a 10,000 metres and a 5000 km track walk. The women's walk pre-dated the introduction of such an event at either the Arab Athletics Championships (1989) or the Pan Arab Games (1992), making it a first for the region.

The medal table was close, with Algeria, Syria and Tunisia each winning seven gold medals. Tunisia topped the table through their eight silver medals to Syria's six. Egypt was also close behind with six gold medals and nine silver medals. Jordan and Oman won their first gold medals in the competition's history.

Ibrahim Ismail Muftah was one of the athletes of the championships, winning all three individual men's sprints. He was an Olympic finalist the following year. Noureddine Morceli of Algeria, winner of the 1500 metres, was among the athletes to emerge from the tournament, and later won three world titles and an Olympic gold in his specialism. Men's shot put winner Bilal Saad Mubarak of Qatar later became a prominent throwers in the region: he was in the top two at the Asian Athletics Championships from 1991 to 2003 and won three straight titles at the Pan Arab Games. Sherif Farouk El Hennawi of Egypt won the hammer throw and later won several African titles in his career. Double long-distance medallist Alyan Sultan Al-Qahtani later won an Asian title.

On the women's side, Hend Kebaoui defended her 400 metres hurdles title and added a 400 metres gold medal and 100 metres silver to that honour. Egypt's Huda Hashem Ismail won both the 100 metres hurdles and heptathlon titles (repeating the feat of Yasmina Azzizi from 1984). Karima Meskin Saad was a medallist in all the women's sprints. All of these athletes won multiple regional titles in their senior careers.

== Medal summary ==
=== Men ===
Event	Gold		Silver		Bronze	
100 metres	Ibrahim Ismail Muftah (QAT)	10.3 CR	Shaker Marzouk (BHR)	10.4	Fouad Johar (BHR)	10.6
200 metres	Ibrahim Ismail Muftah (QAT)	21.0 CR	Shaker Marzouk (BHR)	21.9	Fouad Johar (BHR)	22.2
400 metres	Ibrahim Ismail Muftah (QAT)	47.1 CR	Sulaiman Jumaa (OMN)	47.9	Amer Zafar (KSA)	48.5
800 metres	Jihad Al-Balawi (JOR)	1:53.2	Abdullah Al-Kobeiri (OMN)	1:53.9	Lyes El Mazzini (TUN)	1:54.4
1500 metres	Noureddine Morceli (ALG)	3:48.8 CR	Lyes El Mazzini (TUN)	3:56.8	Jihad Al-Balawi (JOR)	3:57.2
5000 metres	Alyan Sultan Al-Qahtani (KSA)	15:05.7	Fakhreddine Damerji (TUN)	15:14.1	Anwar Al-Harazi (YEM)	15:50.2
10,000 metres	Moussa Al-Hariri (SYR)	31:23.3	Fakhreddine Damerji (TUN)	32:20.5	Abdulhamid Abdou (SYR)	33:21.5
110 m hurdles	Fouad Saleh Ghanem (BHR)	14.1 CR	Ziad Al-Khader (KUW)	14.3	Amine Hacini (ALG)	14.7
400 m hurdles	Fouad Saleh Ghanem (BHR)	52.8	Amine Hacini (ALG)	54.3	Saleh Abdullah (BHR)	54.9
3000 metres steeplechase	Tahar Mohamed (ALG)	8:57.9	Alyan Sultan Al-Qahtani (KSA)	9:15.7	Hamed Naceur (TUN)	9:26.0
4 × 100 m relay	Bahrain (BHR)	41.8 CR	Kuwait (KUW)	42.1	Qatar (QAT)	42.2
4 × 400 m relay	Oman (OMN)	3:17.2	Bahrain (BHR)	3:18.9	Qatar (QAT)	3:18.9
20 km road race	Moussa Al-Hariri (SYR)	1:04:43	Saad Sulaiman (KSA)	1:08:08	Saleh Al-Outaibi (KSA)	1:11:07
10,000 m walk	Hasni Bouzekri (ALG)	49:07.1	Mohammed Saoud (SYR)	51:47.5	Majid Turki (SYR)	52:56.1
High jump	Abdullah Saleh (KSA)	2.03 m	Saleh Zaid Al-Mass (BHR)	2.00 m	Mohamed Haddad (ALG)	2.00 m
Pole vault	Sameh Hassan Farid (EGY)	4.10 m	Ahmed Hamdan (KUW)	4.05 m	Jamal Al-Maai (QAT)	3.90 m
Long jump	Fouad Saleh Ghanem (BHR)	7.19 m	Mohammed Al-Outaibi (KUW)	7.17 m	Nadir Si Mohamed (ALG)	7.09 m
Triple jump	Kader Klouchi (ALG)	15.56 m	Saleh Zaid Al-Mass (BHR)	15.14 m	Youssef Naïli (TUN)	14.98 m
Shot put	Bilal Saad Mubarak (QAT)	15.55 m	Hussain Ali Al-Saeed (KUW)	15.41 m	Malek Tamran (KUW)	14.42 m
Discus throw	Malek Tamran (KUW)	44.94 m	Badr Rashid (QAT)	43.88 m	Sherif Mohamed Abderrahim (EGY)	43.84 m
Hammer throw	Sherif Farouk El Hennawi (EGY)	64.84 m CR	Adel Katami (QAT)	53.04 m	Magdi Zakaria Abdallah (EGY)	51.64 m
Javelin throw	Ahmed Houri (SYR)	62.84 m	Maher Ridane (TUN)	59.78 m	Saleh Khalaf (KUW)	58.04 m
Decathlon	Zakaria Zarzour (SYR)	6438 pts CR	Issam Mohamed El Azzazi (EGY)	5927 pts	Majdal Al-Bek (SYR)	4968 pts

=== Women ===
Event	Gold		Silver		Bronze	
100 metres	Nadia Abdou (ALG)	12.1 CR	Hend Kebaoui (TUN)	12.2	Karima Miskin Saad (EGY)	12.5
200 metres	Nadia Abdou (ALG)	24.9 CR	Karima Miskin Saad (EGY)	25.0	Samia Sassi (TUN)	26.0
400 metres	Hend Kebaoui (TUN)	55.8 CR	Karima Miskin Saad (EGY)	57.9	Hasna Dhébaïbi (TUN)	60.7
800 metres	Maha Herzallah (JOR)	2:20.5	Sonia Makni (TUN)	2:24.5	Hasna Dhébaïbi (TUN)	2:30.0
1500 metres	Houda Chabbouh (TUN)	4:41.9	Maha Herzallah (JOR)	5:05.5	Nada Ayach (SYR)	5:17.4
3000 metres	Houda Chabbouh (TUN)	10:33.8	Amira Yousef (SYR)	10:44.3	Nada Ayach (SYR)	11:54.7
10,000 metres	Amira Yousef (SYR)	42:26.4	Rola Sannoufi (SYR)	48:46.0	Asma Al-Arabi (TUN)	53:23.3
100 m hurdles	Huda Hashem Ismail (EGY)	14.8 CR	Badia Ali Abdessamia (EGY)	15.5	Fazia Gaouaoui (ALG)	15.8
400 m hurdles	Hend Kebaoui (TUN)	60.3 CR	Samia Sassi (TUN)	65.2	Mouna Ayach (SYR)	74.9
4 × 100 m relay	Tunisia (TUN)	49.2	Egypt (EGY)	49.9	Syria (SYR)	52.0
4 × 400 m relay	Tunisia (TUN)	3:54.0 CR	Egypt (EGY)	4:02.7	Syria (SYR)	4:13.4
5000 m walk	Amira Yousef (SYR)	27:50.8	Amani Mohamed Adel (EGY)	28:57.1	Firial Odesho (SYR)	29:33.2
High jump	Badia Ali Abdessamia (EGY)	1.51 m	Haifa Abbas (SYR)	1.51 m	Mountaha Mohammed (JOR)	1.45 m
Long jump	Nadia Abdou (ALG)	5.73 m	Basma Fkih (TUN)	5.36 m	Hala Saka (SYR)	5.24 m
Shot put	Lamia Naouara (TUN)	12.38 m CR	Lina Hazouri (SYR)	10.82 m	Shaala Ramash (SYR)	9.45 m
Discus throw	Lina Hazouri (SYR)	39.02 m	Rida Mahmoud Farghali (EGY)	35.38 m	Douha Al-Shoufi (SYR)	25.78 m
Javelin throw	Maya Ali Abdessamad (EGY)	32.90 m	Lina Hazouri (SYR)	32.42 m	Roueida Fadel (SYR)	20.44 m
Heptathlon	Huda Hashem Ismail (EGY)	4323 pts CR	Badia Ali Abdessamia (EGY)	3773 pts	Nadima Hussain (PLE)	2665 pts

== Medal table ==
Rank	Nation	Gold	Silver	Bronze	Total
1	Tunisia (TUN)	7	8	7	22
2	Syria (SYR)	7	6	13	26
3	Algeria (ALG)	7	1	4	12
4	Egypt (EGY)	6	9	3	18
5	Bahrain (BHR)	4	5	3	12
6	Qatar (QAT)	4	2	3	9
7	Saudi Arabia (KSA)	2	2	2	6
8	Jordan (JOR)	2	1	2	5
9	Kuwait (KUW)	1	5	2	8
10	Oman (OMN)	1	2	0	3
11	Palestine (PLE)	0	0	1	1
11	Yemen (YEM)	0	0	1	1
Totals (12 entries)		41	41	41	123
