= 2000 Arab Junior Athletics Championships =

9th Arab Junior Athletics Championships
- Host city: Damascus, Syria
- Events: 42

The 2000 Arab Junior Athletics Championships was the ninth edition of the international athletics competition for under-20 athletes from Arab countries. It took place in Damascus, Syria – the second consecutive time the city hosted the tournament, and a sixth hosting for Syria. A total of 42 athletics events were contested, 22 for men and 20 for women. Neither Morocco, Algeria nor Qatar—all regional powers in the sport—sent a team to the meeting, which impacted the overall quality of performances.

Egypt topped the table with nineteen gold medals, having won the majority of the women's events. Saudi Arabia was runner-up with ten gold medals – all were in the men's section, reflecting the nation's ban on women athletes. The hosts, Syria, placed third with their six gold medals. Lebanon won its first gold medal in the history of the tournament, topping the podium in the women's 4×100 m relay. The women's programme was expanded with the introduction of the hammer throw, bringing the throws events to parity with men. A minority of track finals had times recorded only to a tenth of a second due to technical restrictions.

The foremost athletes to emerge from the competition were among the Saudi contingent. Mubarak Ata Mubarak added an Asian senior title to his 110 metres hurdles gold that same year. Hamdan Al-Bishi and Hamed Al-Bishi both won multiple sprint medals at the Asian Athletics Championships over the following years. Omar Ahmed El Ghazaly of Egypt won the discus here and later won several African titles in that discipline. Mohammad Al-Azemi, only an 800 m runner-up here, went on to a middle-distance double at the 2011 Asian Athletics Championships. Ismail Ahmed Ismail (1500 m) was also a runner-up in Damascus but went on to the greatest honour among the participants by winning Sudan's first Olympic medal in 2008. On the women's side, his fellow Sudanese middle-distance runner Hind Roko Musa, took an Arab junior double. Egypt's Ines Abul Ala Mohamed (sprints) and Maha Mohamed Mohamed (100 m hurdles, high jump, and heptathlon) were other multiple champions at the competition.

== Medal summary ==
=== Men ===
Event	Gold		Silver		Bronze	
100 metres	Kamal Taher Al-Sabee (KSA)	10.61	Salem Al-Yami (KSA)	10.64	Saad Rumaid Al-Zefeiri (KUW)	10.65
200 metres	Salem Al-Yami (KSA)	21.40	Fayaz Al-Bishi (KSA)	21.66	Saad Rumaid Al-Zefeiri (KUW)	21.84
400 metres	Hamdan Al-Bishi (KSA)	46.78	Hamed Al-Bishi (KSA)	47.91	Khalid Bilal Al-Haber (BHR)	48.29
800 metres	Redouane Fattouh (SYR)	1:49.81	Mohammad Al-Azemi (KUW)	1:50.99	Othman Mohammed Othman (KSA)	1:51.54
1500 metres	Othman Mohammed Othman (KSA)	3:48.30	Ismail Ahmed Ismail (SUD)	3:48.70	Redouane Fattouh (SYR)	3:51.92
5000 metres	Nasser Hamid Al-Bishi (KSA)	14:50.8	Mohammed Al-Halabi (SYR)	14:56.5	Esam Saleh Musleh Juaim (YEM)	15:09.6
10,000 metres	Nasser Hamid Al-Bishi (KSA)	31:06.58	Abdullah Sadiq (KSA)	31:08.78	Esam Saleh Musleh Juaim (YEM)	31:15.03
110 m hurdles	Mubarak Ata Mubarak (KSA)	14.03 CR	Zayed Al-Dosari (KSA)	14.94	Abdel Aziz Mahmoud (EGY)	15.37
400 m hurdles	Hani Mourhej (SYR)	51.46	Hamed Al-Bishi (KSA)	51.61	Amin Mohammed Al-Ozon (SYR)	52.02
3000 metres steeplechase	Rami Ghazi Al-Faar (KSA)	9:05.48	Mohammed Al-Halabi (SYR)	9:13.76	Tamer Eid Ayad (EGY)	9:33.79
4×100 m relay	Saudi Arabia (KSA)	40.61	Kuwait (KUW)	41.88	Oman (OMN)	43.55
4×400 m relay	Saudi Arabia (KSA)	3:08.82 CR	Syria (SYR)	3:16.22	Kuwait (KUW)	3:22.27
10,000 m walk	Walid Mahmoud Ismail (EGY)	48:54.1	Malek Amaleh (SYR)	49:52.1	Ali Assaf (PLE)	55:58.6
High jump	Salem Ibrahim Al-Enazi (KUW)	2.05 m	Hussain Farid Kazerooni (BHR)	2.02 m	Moshe Adel Abu Maati (EGY)	2.02 m
Pole vault	Mohammed Al-Ghanem (KUW)	4.30 m	Ahmed Zakaria (EGY)	4.20 m	Yahya Saleh Al-Hashimi (OMN)	4.20 m
Long jump	Mohammad Hazzory (SYR)	7.28 m	Khalid Ibrahim (KUW)	7.09 m	Hussain Farid Kazerooni (BHR)	7.05 m
Triple jump	Mohammad Hazzory (SYR)	15.21 m	Rashid Al-Rumani (KSA)	15.16 m	Ali Moneim (KUW)	14.46 m
Shot put	Karim Ahmed Khamis (EGY)	15.71 m	Mohamed Abdelatif El Maghawri (EGY)	15.41 m	Malek Zarzour (SYR)	14.65 m
Discus throw	Omar Ahmed El Ghazaly (EGY)	53.07 m CR	Ahab Ahmed Ali (EGY)	50.19 m	Hassan Al-Bekhit (KSA)	49.12 m
Hammer throw	Mohammed Abdulkarim (KUW)	55.88 m	Ramzi Ali Moussa (EGY)	55.67 m	Mohamed Mohsen Anani Youssef (EGY)	51.41 m
Javelin throw	Sadek Abdel Mohsen Anani (EGY)	65.94 m	Hamze Ismail (SYR)	61.02 m	Ahmed Sulaiman Al-Hatali (OMN)	57.14 m
Decathlon	Wafik Mohamed Semlawi (EGY)	5929 pts	Mohammed Rida Al-Matroud (KSA)	5838 pts	Ayman Aouida (SYR)	5628 pts

=== Women ===
Event	Gold		Silver		Bronze	
100 metres	Muna Aziz (EGY)	12.76	Lina Bejjani (LIB)	12.94	Bissan Al-Rashidat (SYR)	12.96
200 metres	Ines Abul Ala Mohamed (EGY)	24.60 CR	Muna Aziz (EGY)	26.25	Diana Forotzelian (LIB)	26.96
400 metres	Ines Abul Ala Mohamed (EGY)	56.33	Munira Saoud (SYR)	60.22	Shima Doha (EGY)	61.03
800 metres	Hind Roko Musa (SUD)	2:15.96	Wafaa Al-Bishini (SYR)	2:17.12	Aisha Antar (SYR)	2:21.10
1500 metres	Hind Roko Musa (SUD)	4:49.51	Arej Kaebor (SYR)	4:51.54	Wafaa Al-Bishini (SYR)	4:53.28
3000 metres	Sarah Ahmed Abu Hassan (EGY)	10:32.9	Rouaa Al-Jallad (SYR)	10:35.1	Siham Mahmoud (EGY)	10:37.0
5000 metres	Douaa Adel Es Sayed (EGY)	18:06.43	Siham Mahmoud (EGY)	18:10.69	Rouaa Al-Jallad (SYR)	19:26.01
100 m hurdles	Maha Mohamed Mohamed (EGY)	15.0	Rasha Sharifa (SYR)	15.9	Rania Ezzedin Ismail (EGY)	16.4
400 m hurdles	Munira Saoud (SYR)	64.62	Maha Mohamed Mohamed (EGY)	66.28	Hefroun Helo (SYR)	68.65
4×100 m relay	Lebanon (LIB)	51.39	Syria (SYR)	52.37	Egypt (EGY)	53.57
4×400 m relay	Egypt (EGY)	4:02.13	Syria (SYR)	4:06.87	Lebanon (LIB)	4:28.39
5000 m walk	Safar Ahmed Sayed (EGY)	27:07.2	Shaymaa Hamada (EGY)	27:13.6	Hasna Hussein (SYR)	31:34.0
High jump	Maha Mohamed Mohamed (EGY)	1.64 m	Amira Anwar (EGY)	1.61 m	Rasha Sharifa (SYR)	1.45 m
Long jump	Rasha Sharifa (SYR)	5.06 m	Arwa Abu Shabab (JOR)	4.95 m	Rania Ezzedin Ismail (EGY)	4.77 m
Triple jump	Arwa Abu Shabab (JOR)	11.08 m	Saoud Zoughal (SYR)	10.80 m	Noura Dalati (SYR)	10.31 m
Shot put	Amal Abdel Sabour Mohamed (EGY)	11.98 m	Hiba Saad Abdallah (EGY)	11.94 m	Dalcha Ahmed (SYR)	10.45 m
Discus throw	Nourine Ahmed El Gharbawi (EGY)	36.83 m	Hiba Saad Abdallah (EGY)	31.36 m	Dalcha Ahmed (SYR)	30.20 m
Hammer throw	Risha Karim Mohamed Abid (EGY)	45.65 m	Rawd Issa Abd Hussein (EGY)	43.86 m	Lara Ibrahim (SYR)	30.88 m
Javelin throw	Hanaa Ramadan Omar (EGY)	42.05 m	Ghofrane Shamak (SYR)	41.48 m	Rihan Mohamed Nemha (EGY)	37.20 m
Heptathlon	Maha Mohamed Mohamed (EGY)	4068 pts	Rasha Sharifa (SYR)	3513 pts	Rania Ezzedin Ismail (EGY)	3346 pts

== Medal table ==
Rank	Nation	Gold	Silver	Bronze	Total
1	Egypt (EGY)	19	12	11	42
2	Saudi Arabia (KSA)	10	8	2	20
3	Syria (SYR)	6	15	15	36
4	Kuwait (KUW)	3	3	4	10
5	Sudan (SUD)	2	1	0	3
6	Lebanon (LIB)	1	1	2	4
7	Jordan (JOR)	1	1	0	2
8	Bahrain (BHR)	0	1	2	3
9	Oman (OMN)	0	0	3	3
10	Yemen (YEM)	0	0	2	2
11	Palestine (PLE)	0	0	1	1
Totals (11 entries)		42	42	42	126
