= 2004 Arab Junior Athletics Championships =

11th Arab Junior Athletics Championships
- Host city: Damascus, Syria
- Events: 43

The 2004 Arab Junior Athletics Championships was the eleventh edition of the international athletics competition for under-20 athletes from Arab countries. It took place in Damascus, Syria – the fourth time that the city hosted the tournament. A total of 43 athletics events were contested, 22 for men and 21 for women. The 2002 medal table leader, Morocco, was absent from the tournament.

Sudan topped the table for the first time with eight gold medals. Egypt was a close second with seven titles. Qatar were third with six gold medals, all in the men's side. A minority of track finals had times recorded only to a tenth of a second due to technical restrictions. Junior implements were used in the men's throwing events for a second edition running, setting the standard for future events.

On the men's side Antar Zerguelaïne won a middle-distance double, Nagmeldin Ali Abubakr was a double sprint medallist and Aymen Ben Ahmed took the hurdles gold medal. All three went on to win senior medals at African level. Long jumper Saleh Al-Haddad was a clear winner and took multiple Asian medals as a senior. Gretta Taslakian emerged on the women's side, breaking new ground for Lebanon by winning a sprint double – also her country's first individual gold medals at the competition. Sudanese trio Muna Jabir Adam, Hind Roko Musa and Nawal El Jack won eight individual medals between them in the track events – all would make an impact as seniors at the Pan Arab Games.

== Medal summary ==
=== Men ===
Event	Gold		Silver		Bronze	
100 metres	Mohammed Sanad Al-Rashidi (BHR)	10.34	Mustafa Amir Ibrahim (EGY)	10.49	Moussa Al-Husawi (KSA)	10.65
200 metres	Mohammed Sanad Al-Rashidi (BHR)	20.85 CR	Nagmeldin Ali Abubakr (SUD)	21.11	Mustafa Amir Ibrahim (EGY)	21.21
400 metres	Nagmeldin Ali Abubakr (SUD)	46.92	Adam Mohamed Al-Nour (SUD)	47.97	Mohammed Salem Al-Rawahi (OMN)	48.07
800 metres	Antar Zerguelaïne (ALG)	1:51.7	Mohammed Othman Hussain (KSA)	1:53.0	Abdallah Abdelgader (SUD)	1:54.7
1500 metres	Antar Zerguelaïne (ALG)	3:48.47	Nasser Shams Karim (QAT)	3:49.31	Issa Salem Ali (SYR)	3:50.27
5000 metres	Mohammed Abdu Al-Bekhit (QAT)	14:31.40	Ahmed Abdallah (SUD)	14:33.67	Jassem Yousef Ibrahim (QAT)	14:38.80
10,000 metres	Nasser Jamal Nasser (QAT)	30:17.3	Salem Saeed Malek (QAT)	30:40.5	Nasser Bilal (SUD)	30:51.8
110 m hurdles	Aymen Ben Ahmed (TUN)	14.03 =CR	Mustafa Habib Al-Ajami (KSA)	14.76	Jalal Salem Al-Ghobashi (OMN)	14.89
400 m hurdles	Bandar Yahya Sharahili (KSA)	50.81 CR	Mohammed Razgallah Daak (KSA)	52.10	Moussa Haroun Al-Ruwaih (KUW)	52.80
3000 metres steeplechase	Mubarak Ismail Rashid (QAT)	8:58.4	Rabih Bahloumi (ALG)	8:59.4	Salem Saeed Malek (QAT)	9:06.0
4×100 m relay	Oman (OMN)	40.34	Saudi Arabia (KSA)	41.14	Syria (SYR)	42.83
4×400 m relay	Sudan (SUD)	3:11.52	Saudi Arabia (KSA)	3:12.96	Oman (OMN)	3:14.33
10,000 m walk	Mohammed Joumaa (SYR)	46:52.4	Zakaria Soulimane (ALG)	47:52.2	Mohamed Abdel Tawab (EGY)	48:34.7
High jump	Ahmed Farouk Abdel Zaher (EGY)	2.10 m	Mohamed Ridha Rabaya (ALG)	2.02 m	Hamza Labidi (ALG)	2.02 m
Pole vault	Hamed Ali Al-Shehabi (QAT)	4.80 m	Abderrahmane Tamedda (TUN)	4.70 m	Abdelatif Djadoun (ALG)	4.30 m
Long jump	Saleh Al-Haddad (KUW)	7.49 m	Mubarak Jasser Al-Jassem (KSA)	7.24 m	Ahmed Sayed Kheirallah (EGY)	7.17 m
Triple jump	Azmi Mohammed Sulaiman (QAT)	15.91 m	Yasser Gholoum Hussain (BHR)	15.83 m	Mohammed Yousef Al-Sahabi (BHR)	15.27 m
Shot put	Mustafa Abdel El Moati (EGY)	18.43 m	Meshari Sorour Saad (KUW)	18.38 m	Ali Ahmed Khalil (KUW)	18.38 m
Discus throw	Ahmed Mohamed Dheeb (QAT)	57.40 m CR	Saad Hussain Al-Bakhmi (KSA)	53.80 m	Mohamed Wadah Mansour (LBY)	53.32 m
Hammer throw	Meshal Abdulrahman Al-Humoud (KUW)	61.90 m	Ali Abdulaziz Kamir (KUW)	60.50 m	Ahmed Mohamed Abdelghani Suleiman (EGY)	58.60 m
Javelin throw	Yasser Mohamed Ali Hassan (SUD)	60.98 m	Mohammed Fadhel Al-Mahdi (QAT)	60.98 m	Khamis Ghabash Al-Qutaiti (OMN)	59.30 m
Decathlon	Meshari Zaki Mubarak (KUW)	7012 pts CR	Mohamed Abbas Darwish (UAE)	6453 pts	Saeed Fahd Al-Bishi (KSA)	6034 pts

=== Women ===
Event	Gold		Silver		Bronze	
100 metres	Gretta Taslakian (LIB)	12.01 CR	Malika Ali Bacha (ALG)	12.20	Munira Romdhane Al-Saleh (SYR)	12.32
200 metres	Gretta Taslakian (LIB)	24.30 CR	Muna Jabir Adam (SUD)	24.39	Munira Romdhane Al-Saleh (SYR)	25.00
400 metres	Muna Jabir Adam (SUD)	54.21 CR	Nawal El Jack (SUD)	55.18	Munira Romdhane Al-Saleh (SYR)	55.74
800 metres	Muna Jabir Adam (SUD)	2:11.9	Chahrazad Cheboub (ALG)	2:12.5	Imène Badraoui (TUN)	2:14.7
1500 metres	Safa Aïssaoui (TUN)	4:28.10 CR	Hind Roko Musa (SUD)	4:28.58	Chahrazad Cheboub (ALG)	4:31.09
3000 metres	Safa Aïssaoui (TUN)	9:46.8	Hind Roko Musa (SUD)	9:49.8	Meshaar El Rida Bakheet (SUD)	9:50.2
5000 metres	Hind Roko Musa (SUD)	17:02.0 CR	Sarah Ahmed Abu Hassan (EGY)	17:12.2	Duka Mana (SUD)	17:33.8
100 m hurdles	Samira Harrouche (ALG)	14.37	Lynda Bouzenad (ALG)	14.74	Fadwa Boudhat (SYR)	15.00
400 m hurdles	Ghofrane Mohammad (SYR)	59.91 CR	Nawal El Jack (SUD)	60.19	Samira Harrouche (ALG)	61.82
4×100 m relay	Sudan (SUD)	48.33	Syria (SYR)	48.35	Algeria (ALG)	48.37
4×400 m relay	Sudan (SUD)	3:44.84 CR	Syria (SYR)	3:49.48	Algeria (ALG)	4:03.73
5000 m walk	Sara Arrouk (SYR)	26:44.6	Rania Othman (SYR)	27:09.6	Nashwa Ibrahim Fathi Ibrahim (EGY)	27:09.7
High jump	Amira Khaled Abu El Ata (EGY)	1.65 m	Muna Khalifa Kamel (EGY)	1.62 m	Mayada Belkhiria (TUN)	1.59 m
Pole vault	Nesrine Ahmed Imam (EGY)	3.40 m =CR	Wahiba Hamreras (ALG)	3.40 m	Fatima Al-Zahraa (JOR)	3.20 m
Long jump	Najwa Mathlouthi (TUN)	5.83 m	Nahed Abid (TUN)	5.62 m	Aljia Rezig (ALG)	5.62 m
Triple jump	Najwa Mathlouthi (TUN)	12.85 m	Chiraz Kamila Sahnoune (ALG)	12.44 m	Nanassi Zaki Saddik (EGY)	12.30 m
Shot put	Amal Abdel Sabour Mohamed (EGY)	13.75 m	Oktar Bakhtas (SYR)	12.60 m	Ghada Ghezal (TUN)	12.20 m
Discus throw	Sara Sayed Hassib (EGY)	43.99 m	Ghada Ghezal (TUN)	37.10 m	Hiba Omar (SYR)	36.90 m
Hammer throw	Iman Mohamed El Ashri (EGY)	51.20 m CR	Yasmin Ashraf Abdeslam (EGY)	50.08 m	Lara Ibrahim (SYR)	32.18 m
Javelin throw	Yamen Al-Bouti (SYR)	31.40 m	Hiba Omar (SYR)	30.35 m	Samah Mohammed (PLE)	25.48 m
Heptathlon	Fadwa Al-Bouza (SYR)	4345 pts	Marwa Mohamed Naim (EGY)	3739 pts	Noura Al-Khrad (SYR)	3431 pts

== Medal table ==
Rank	Nation	Gold	Silver	Bronze	Total
1	Sudan (SUD)	8	8	4	20
2	Egypt (EGY)	7	5	6	18
3	Qatar (QAT)	6	3	2	11
4	Syria (SYR)	5	5	9	19
5	Tunisia (TUN)	5	3	3	11
6	Algeria (ALG)	3	8	7	18
7	Kuwait (KUW)	3	2	2	7
8	Bahrain (BHR)	2	1	1	4
9	Lebanon (LIB)	2	0	0	2
10	Saudi Arabia (KSA)	1	7	2	10
11	Oman (OMN)	1	0	4	5
12	United Arab Emirates (UAE)	0	1	0	1
13	Libya (LBY)	0	0	1	1
13	Palestine (PLE)	0	0	1	1
Totals (14 entries)		43	43	42	128
