= 2012 Arab Junior Athletics Championships =

15th Arab Junior Athletics Championships
- The host stadium
- Dates: 16–19 May
- Host city: Amman, Jordan
- Venue: Amman International Stadium
- Events: 42

The 2012 Arab Junior Athletics Championships was the fifteenth edition of the international athletics competition for under-20 athletes from Arab countries. It took place between 16 and 19 May at Amman International Stadium in Amman, Jordan. It was the first time that Jordan hosted the event. A total of 42 athletics events were contested, 21 for men and 21 for women. The men's 10,000 metres and women's 5000 metres were dropped from the programme for this edition.

Egypt topped the medal table with nine gold medals, narrowly edging Tunisia which had eight golds and the same total of 23 overall. Saudi Arabia won eight gold medals and Algeria had the third highest tally at sixteen medals (six gold). The host nation Jordan did not win any events but managed three silvers and a bronze. A total of fifteen nations reached the medal table.

== Medal summary ==
=== Men ===
| Event | Gold | | Silver | | Bronze | |
|---|---|---|---|---|---|---|
| 100 metres | Yusef Alshaalani (KSA) | 10.58 | Eid Abdullah Alkawari (QAT) | 10.62 | Hasanain Hasan (IRQ) | 10.70 |
| 200 metres | Hasanain Hasan (IRQ) | 21.20 | Ali Hasan AlJasem (QAT) | 21.34 | Eid Abdullah Alkawari (QAT) | 21.47 |
| 400 metres | Saddam Suleiman (SUD) | 46.93 | Bandar Atieh Kaabi (KSA) | 47.46 | Mohammad Belbachir (ALG) | 47.53 |
| 800 metres | Mohammad Belbachir (ALG) | 1:49.47 | Mohammad Ahmad Ismail (SUD) | 1:50.29 | Muayad Mohamed Ibrahim (QAT) | 1:51.51 |
| 1500 metres | Abdullah Obaid Alsaleh (KSA) | 3:47.58 | Abdessalem El Ayouni (TUN) | 3:52.63 | Mohammad Amine El Ayachi (ALG) | 3:58.08 |
| 5000 metres | Abdelmuneim Yahya (SUD) | 15:05.28 | Mouloud Madoy (ALG) | 15:18.38 | Mustafa Shaghmim (EGY) | 15:19.89 |
| 100 m hurdles | Mousa Alsebiani (KSA) | 13.71 CR | Yaaqoub Alyouha (KUW) | 13.72 | Rami Gharsalli (TUN) | 13.90 |
| 400 m hurdles | Ibrahim Bashir (KSA) | 51.71 | Mohamed Riadh Essayeh (TUN) | 51.98 | Mustsfa Ammad Obaid (IRQ) | 52.15 |
| 3000 m steeplechase | Bilal Tabti (ALG) | 9:18.04 | Salem Mohamed Salem (EGY) | 9:19.47 | Hashem Salah Abbas (QAT) | 9:26.41 |
| 4 × 100 m relay | Saudi Arabia (KSA) | 41.52 | Iraq (IRQ) | 41.77 | Bahrain (BHR) | 42.89 |
| 4 × 400 m relay | Saudi Arabia (KSA) | 3:16.98 | Iraq (IRQ) | 3:18.29 | Sudan (SUD) | 3:21.94 |
| 10 km walk | Hussein Mohammad (QAT) | 44:44.45 | Hazem Ahmad (SYR) | 45:13.06 | Ashaali Hasan Jasem (UAE) | 47:25.73 |
| High jump | Muammar Barsham (QAT) | 2.14 m | Amro Sameer Kasi (EGY) | 2.06 m | Sinan Adnan (IRQ) | 2.06 m |
| Pole vault | Mohamed Romdhana (TUN) | 4.70 m | Jaber Khalifa (QAT) | 4.40 m | Badr Jasem (KUW) | 4.20 m |
| Long jump | Muhannad Qasem Alabsi (KSA) | 7.25 m | Abdelaziz Khalil (SYR) | 7.18 m | Jasem Mohamed Mustafa (UAE) | 6.99 m |
| Triple jump | Talal Zayed (KUW) | 15.74 m | Jasem Al Saad (KUW) | 14.80 m | Hussein Al Dananouni (LBA) | 14.47 m |
| Shot put | Mohammad Omar Mousa (KSA) | 18.35 m | Ahmad Amrou Mousa (EGY) | 17.99 m | Saif Nouri (IRQ) | 17.28 m |
| Discus throw | Mustafa Kadhem (IRQ) | 52.14 m | Khaled Mohamed Deeb (QAT) | 50.69 m | Osama Hasan Alghufaili (KSA) | 49.10m |
| Hammer throw | Ashraf Amgad Elseify (QAT) | 78.62 m CR | Hisham Lutfi Alsayed (EGY) | 64.01 m | Mubarak Alhendal (KUW) | 61.98 m |
| Javelin throw | Majed Muhsen Albadri (EGY) | 63.19 m | Fadl Fayez Saeed (EGY) | 62.07 m | Mkarem Mahameed (SYR) | 59.97 m |
| Decathlon | Majed Al Zaid (KUW) | 6223 pts | Kiwan Tawfeeq (IRQ) | 5966 pts | Mohamed Romdhana (TUN) | 5795 pts |

=== Women ===
| Event | Gold | | Silver | | Bronze | |
|---|---|---|---|---|---|---|
| 100 metres | Maha Almuallem (LIB) | 12.11 | Basant Mohamed Awad (EGY) | 12.12 | Jihan Laabidi (TUN) | 12.46 |
| 200 metres | Basant Mohamed Awad (EGY) | 24.95 | Abir El Barkaoui (TUN) | 25.02 | Maha Almuallem (LIB) | 25.75 |
| 400 metres | Abir El Barkaoui (TUN) | 56.12 | Naziman Amara (ALG) | 57.90 | Hajar Saeed (SUD) | 57.96 |
| 800 metres | Hallouma Jerfal (TUN) | 2:11.02 | Tasabih Alsayed (SUD) | 2:11.04 | Nahida Albawwat (JOR) | 2:26.33 |
| 1500 metres | Hallouma Jerfal (TUN) | 4:47.20 | Rasha Subhi Ayoub (JOR) | 5:08.92 | Intisar Alshoshan (LBA) | 5:17.38 |
| 3000 metres | Darin Bin Amer (ALG) | 10:06.63 | Sujoud Alkhatba (JOR) | 10:55.25 | Zainab Hashem (IRQ) | 12:00.62 |
| 100 m hurdles | Selma Abdelhamid (TUN) | 14.43 | Houjaira Achour (ALG) | 15.04 | Fatima Alzahraa Taatouq (ALG) | 15.18 |
| 400 m hurdles | Tasabih Alsayed (SUD) | 1:00.96 | Dahieh Haddar (ALG) | 1:02.34 | Marwa Boumaiza (TUN) | 1:02.90 |
| 3000 m steeplechase | Hajar Sakhal (ALG) | 11:15.16 | Refka Abdennebi (TUN) | 11:25.29 | Rebab El Fatnassi (TUN) | 12:08.43 |
| 4 × 100 m relay | Algeria (ALG) | 49.50 | Egypt (EGY) | 50.93 | Iraq (IRQ) | 52.20 |
| 4 × 400 m relay | Algeria (ALG) | 3:57.10 | Tunisia (TUN) | 4:01.17 | Sudan (SUD) | 4:04.14 |
| 10 km walk | Chahinez Al Nasri (TUN) | 47:30.28 CR | Tahani Ghezal (TUN) | 49:09.71 | Braiza Ghezlani (ALG) | 50:18.22 |
| High jump | Basant Musaad Mohammad (EGY) | 1.70 m | Maryam Mohammad (BHR) | 1.64 m | Liza Madoni (ALG) | 1.64 m |
| Pole vault | Dora Mahfoudhi (TUN) | 3.55 m CR | Diana Khasawneh (JOR) | 2.90 m | Reem Mohamed Abdulmutajali (EGY) | 2.80 m |
| Long jump | Suhaila Helmi Aljabrouni (EGY) | 5.64 m | Rabaa Rezgui (TUN) | 5.57 m | Kristal Alsanea (LIB) | 5.24 m |
| Triple jump | Rabaa Rezgui (TUN) | 13.01 m | Suhaila Helmi Aljabrouni (EGY) | 12.65 m | Asmaa Mohammad Gharib (EGY) | 12.47 m |
| Shot put | Fadia Saad Ibrahim (EGY) | 14.48 m CR | Rahma Bouslama (TUN) | 12.05 m | Asrar Ahmad El-Mannaï Larab (QAT) | 11.60 m |
| Discus throw | Nuha Abdel Dayem Amin (EGY) | 46.80 m | Fadiya Saad Ibrahim (EGY) | 42.27 m | Inas Al Sayeh (LBA) | 40.79 m |
| Javelin throw | Suhaila Mousa (EGY) | 42.38 m | Nada Ayman Abu Alfutouh (EGY) | 40.35 m | Rima bin Issa (ALG) | 36.59 m |
| Hammer throw | Aya Ibrahim Mohammad (EGY) | 52.70 m | Nada Ayman Abu Alfutouh (EGY) | 52.02 m | Nabiha Gueddah (TUN) | 50.38 m |
| Heptathlon | Aya Husam Tharwat (EGY) | 4519 pts | Noor Alsoos (SYR) | 4330 pts | Marwa Boumaiza (TUN) | 4135 pts |

== Medal table ==
| Rank | Nation | Gold | Silver | Bronze | Total |
|---|---|---|---|---|---|
| 1 | Egypt (EGY) | 9 | 11 | 3 | 23 |
| 2 | Tunisia (TUN) | 8 | 8 | 7 | 23 |
| 3 | Saudi Arabia (KSA) | 8 | 1 | 1 | 10 |
| 4 | Algeria (ALG) | 6 | 4 | 6 | 16 |
| 5 | Qatar (QAT) | 3 | 4 | 4 | 11 |
| 6 | Sudan (SUD) | 3 | 2 | 3 | 8 |
| 7 | Iraq (IRQ) | 2 | 3 | 6 | 11 |
| 8 | Kuwait (KUW) | 2 | 2 | 2 | 6 |
| 9 | Lebanon (LIB) | 1 | 0 | 2 | 3 |
| 10 | Jordan (JOR) | 0 | 3 | 1 | 4 |
| 10 | Syria (SYR) | 0 | 3 | 1 | 4 |
| 12 | Bahrain (BHR) | 0 | 1 | 1 | 2 |
| 13 | Libya (LBA) | 0 | 0 | 3 | 3 |
| 14 | United Arab Emirates (UAE) | 0 | 0 | 2 | 2 |
| Totals (14 entries) | | 42 | 42 | 42 | 126 |
