= 2016 Arab Junior Athletics Championships =

17th Arab Junior Athletics Championships
- Dates: 5–8 May
- Host city: Tlemcen, Algeria
- Venue: Lalla-Setti Athletics Stadium
- Events: 44

The 2016 Arab Junior Athletics Championships was the seventeenth edition of the international athletics competition for under-20 athletes from Arab countries. It took place between 5–8 May at the Lalla-Setti Athletics Stadium in Tlemcen, Algeria. It was the first time that Algeria hosted the event. A total of 44 athletics events were contested, 22 for men and 22 for women.

Around 800 athletes from 20 countries were expected to appear at the competition, though only 232 athletes from 15 nations ultimately did so.

Bahrain took the most gold medals with 16 while Tunisia won the next highest with 9. The host nation Algeria took the most medals with a total of 39, seven of them gold.

== Medal summary ==
=== Men ===
Event	Gold		Silver		Bronze	
100 metres	Mohamed Farès Jelassi (TUN)	10.52	Ammar Essifi (OMN)	10.62	Saïd El Omayri (BHR)	10.76
200 metres	Moussa Issa (BHR)	21.44	Amine Bouanani (ALG)	21.60	Taha Hussein Yacine (IRQ)	21.77
400 metres	Moussa Issa (BHR)	46.95	Taha Hussein Yacine (IRQ)	47.14	Ahmad Saleh Mahda (KSA)	48.38
800 metres	Riadh Chenini (TUN)	1:50.62	Adam Fadhl-Allah (SUD)	1:51.31	Mohamed Rahim Zaghir (IRQ)	1:51.97
1500 metres	Riadh Chenini (TUN)	3:53.09	Ali Kaddachi (TUN)	3:53.17	Abdallah Abdelfatih (DJI)	3:55.72
5000 metres	Djamel Abdi Direh (DJI)	14:26.11	Aden Arbah (DJI)	14:30.11	Hosni Ismail Aissa (SUD)	14:38.39
10,000 metres	Djamel Abdi Direh (DJI)	30:07.47	Abdi Ibrahim Abdou (BHR)	30:32.18	Ali Djouder (ALG)	31:15.04
100 m hurdles	Amine Bouanani (ALG)	13.96	Mohamed Saleh Nadhem (IRQ)	14.12	Salah Khade Salah (IRQ)	14.21
400 m hurdles	Abderrahmane Youssef (KSA)	52.11	Mohamed Amine Touati (TUN)	52.97	Jassem Mohamed (IRQ)	53.05
3000 m steeplechase	Sofiane Cherni (TUN)	9:10.03	Kenzi Souadia (ALG)	9:11.27	Mohamed Amine Jhinaoui (TUN)	9:15.82
4 × 100 m relay	Oman (OMN)	41.59	Saudi Arabia (KSA)	42.30	Iraq (IRQ)	42.33
4 × 400 m relay	Algeria (ALG)	3:13.35	Sudan (SUD)	3:13.36	Egypt (EGY)	3:13.89
10 km walk	Bahaeddine Gatri (TUN)	45:48.08	Mustafa Reza Alouani (IRQ)	47:17.76	Billal Djaafri (ALG)	47:58.48
High jump	Houssam Hussein (IRQ)	2.05 m	Hicham Bouhanoun (ALG) Mohamed Hamdi (QAT)	2.00 m	Not awarded	
Pole vault	Ali Mohsen (IRQ)	4.90 m	Réda Boudchiche (ALG)	4.30 m	Taoufik Ahmed (KSA)	4.20 m
Long jump	Yasser Mohamed Tahar Triki (ALG)	7.43 m	Abdelhak Bouziziane (ALG)	7.19 m	Ihab Fathi Abboud (LBA)	7.02 m
Triple jump	Yasser Mohamed Tahar Triki (ALG)	16.01 m CR	Ihab Fathi Abboud (LBA)	14.90 m	Ahmed El Hani (TUN)	14.57 m
Shot put	Moadh Mohamed Ibrahim (QAT)	17.00 m	Alaeddine Chaalal (ALG)	16.24 m	Akram Sassi (TUN)	15.08 m
Discus throw	Moadh Mohamed Ibrahim (QAT)	60.13 m CR	Aboubacar Mohamed Zakaria (KSA)	50.32 m	Mustapha Hassen Abu Chahin (KSA)	44.72m
Hammer throw	Hussein Thamer Abdelwahed (IRQ)	66.00 m	Farès Ben Saïd (TUN)	60.84 m	Amir Ali Hussein (IRQ)	58.93 m
Javelin throw	Yacine Khalfaoui (TUN)	61.37 m	Salah Younes Mouhcen (IRQ)	57.71 m	Elhamad Mourtadha Aissa (KSA)	57.57 m
Decathlon	Souheil Hemani (ALG)	6052 pts	Ramzi Ayari (TUN)	5982 pts	Abderrazak Slimani (ALG)	5783 pts

=== Women ===
Event	Gold		Silver		Bronze	
100 metres	Bashira Nasser (BHR)	11.66 CR	Imène Issa Jassem (BHR)	11.68	Mazoun El Alaouia (OMN)	12.17
200 metres	Edwilge Ova Naim (BHR)	23.21 CR	Bashira Nasser (BHR)	23.91	Manel Bendebka (ALG)	25.67
400 metres	Imène Issa Jassem (BHR)	55.44	Fatma Rezig (TUN)	59.74	Chaima Abdelaziz (ALG)	1:01.82
800 metres	Marta Hibatou (BHR)	2:10.77	Hela Hamdi (TUN)	2:12.67	Sarra Houaouti (ALG)	2:16.52
1500 metres	Dalila Abdelkader (BHR)	4:16.24 CR	Hela Hamdi (TUN)	4:33.81	Sonia Farouk Hamdan (SUD)	4:34.81
3000 metres	Ribitu Bouatiou Idao (BHR)	9:20.46	Makonine Dissa Djissa (BHR)	9:24.30	Yasmina Housseini (ALG)	11:7.40
5000 metres	Ribitu Bouatiou Idao (BHR)	16:57.46	Makonine Dissa Djissa (BHR)	17:00.42	Katia Belbey (ALG)	19:36.68
100 m hurdles	Aminat Yusuf Jamal (BHR)	14.53	Yousra Arar (ALG)	14.66	Mazoun El Alaouia (OMN)	15.01
400 m hurdles	Aminat Yusuf Jamal (BHR)	58.25 CR	Chaima Ounis (ALG)	1:03.25	Houda Cheikh (ALG)	1:04.05
3000 m steeplechase	Makonine Dissa Djissa (BHR)	10:02.68	Maroua Bouzaiani (TUN)	10:46.91	Katia Belbey (ALG)	12:32.79
4 × 100 m relay	Bahrain (BHR)	46.60 CR	Algeria (ALG)	48.72	Iraq (IRQ)	1:00.53
4 × 400 m relay	Bahrain (BHR)	3:46.90	Algeria (ALG)	3:58.11	Tunisia (TUN)	4:07.37
10 km walk	Rihab Mansouri (TUN)	52:38	Zina Bouhraoua (ALG)	53:10	Tinhinane Boumaaza (ALG)	54:48
High jump	Affaf Benhadja (ALG) Mariem Abdallah (IRQ)	1.63 m	Not awarded		Zaineb Amer Karim (IRQ)	1.53 m
Pole vault	Maryam Yasser Mohamed (EGY)	3.00 m	Sherine Sharif Mahmoud (EGY)	2.60 m	Zahra Jamal Sakran (IRQ)	2.60 m
Long jump	Chelbia Ben Salem (TUN)	5.60 m	Lidia Sahraoui (ALG)	5.54 m	Insaf Zitouni (ALG)	5.45 m
Triple jump	Chelbia Ben Salem (TUN)	12.46 m	Leila Ben Si-Ali (ALG)	12.18 m	Shahd Kassem (IRQ)	11.38 m
Shot put	Sarah Ahmed Mannai (QAT)	11.97 m	Imene Bounab (ALG)	11.70 m	Folla Kermech (ALG)	9.99 m
Discus throw	Ritaj Salem Essayah (LBA)	51.58 m CR	Fatma Youcef Elhosni (UAE)	39.37 m	Amina Mohammedi (ALG)	37.17 m
Javelin throw	Sarah Ahmed Mannai (QAT)	36.11 m	Lidya Outemzabet (ALG)	29.44 m	Ikram Afrit (ALG)	28.38 m
Hammer throw	Ritaj Salem Essayah (LBA)	50.92 m	Azza Eddaif (TUN)	43.48 m	Chahrazed Kheloufi (ALG)	42.80 m
Heptathlon	Ania Ainouche (ALG)	4060 pts	Yousra Baazizi (ALG)	3613 pts	Moudhi Elbellouchi (OMN)	1739 pts

== Medal table ==
Rank	Nation	Gold	Silver	Bronze	Total
1	Bahrain (BHR)	14	5	1	20
2	Tunisia (TUN)	9	9	4	22
3	Algeria (ALG)	7	16	16	39
4	Iraq (IRQ)	4	4	10	18
5	Qatar (QAT)	4	1	0	5
6	Djibouti (DJI)	2	1	1	4
6	Libya (LBA)	2	1	1	4
8	Saudi Arabia (KSA)	1	2	4	7
9	Oman (OMN)	1	1	3	5
10	Egypt (EGY)	1	1	1	3
11	Sudan (SUD)	0	2	2	4
12	United Arab Emirates (UAE)	0	1	0	1
Totals (12 entries)		45	44	43	132
