= Ghofrane Mohammad =

Syrian hurdler

Personal information
- Born: June 6, 1989 (age 37) Aleppo, Syria
- Height: 1.76 m (5 ft 9 1/2 in)
- Weight: 72 kg (159 lb)

Sport
- Country: Syria
- Sport: Athletics
- Events: 100 m, 200 m, 100m Hurdles, 400m Hurdles
Medal record
Women's athletics
Representing Syria
West Asian Games
Gold medal – first place	2005 Doha	200 m
Silver medal – second place	2005 Doha	100 m
Arab Championships
Silver medal – second place	2005 Radès	4×100 relay
Silver medal – second place	2005 Radès	4×400 relay
Bronze medal – third place	2007 Amman	400 m
Asian Junior Championships
Gold medal – first place	2006 Macau	400 m hurdles
Gold medal – first place	2008 Jakarta	400 m hurdles
Silver medal – second place	2006 Macau	200 m

Ghofrane Mohammad (Arabic: غفران محمد; born 6 June 1989) is a Syrian hurdler from Aleppo. At the 2012 Summer Olympics, she competed in the Women's 400 metres hurdles. She did not advance from round 1 and was later disqualified for testing positive for methylhexaneamine.

She competed for Syria also at the 2016 Summer Olympics in the women's 400 metres hurdles. She finished 8th in her heat and did not qualify for the semifinals. She was the flag bearer for Syria during the closing ceremony.

== Personal bests ==
Outdoor

- 100 m – 12.12 (Taipa 2006)
- 200 m – 24.45 (Taipa 2006)
- 400 m – 55.26 (Amman 2007)
- 100 m H – 14.03 (El Maadi 2022)
- 400 m H – 56.89 NR (Almaty 2016)

Indoor

- 400 m – 55.45 (Doha 2016)
- 60 m H – 9.15 (Istanbul 2012)

== Competition record ==
Year	Competition	Venue	Position	Event	Notes
Representing Syria
2004	Arab Junior Championships	Damascus, Syria	1st	400 m hurdles	59.91 CR
2005	World Youth Championships	Marrakesh, Morocco	6th	400 m hurdles	1:01.39
2005	Arab Championships	Radès, Tunisia	4th	100 metres	12.08
2005	Arab Championships	Radès, Tunisia	4th	400 m hurdles	1:02.65
2005	Arab Championships	Radès, Tunisia	2nd	4×100 relay	48.35
2005	Arab Championships	Radès, Tunisia	2nd	4×400 relay	3:49.75
2005	West Asian Games	Doha, Qatar	2nd	100 metres	12.33
2005	West Asian Games	Doha, Qatar	1st	200 metres	24.66 GR
2006	Asian Junior Championships	Macau, China	5th	100 metres	12.12
2006	Asian Junior Championships	Macau, China	2nd	200 metres	24.45
2006	Asian Junior Championships	Macau, China	1st	400 m hurdles	57.66
2006	World Junior Championships	Beijing, China	7th	400 m hurdles	58.49
2006	Arab Junior Championships	Cairo, Egypt	1st	100 metres	12.43
2006	Arab Junior Championships	Cairo, Egypt	1st	200 metres	24.39
2006	Arab Junior Championships	Cairo, Egypt	1st	400 m hurdles	58.82 CR
2007	Arab Championships	Amman, Jordan	3rd	400 metres	55.26
2007	Arab Championships	Amman, Jordan	4th	400 m hurdles	1:00.44
2007	Asian Championships	Amman, Jordan	4th	400 m hurdles	59.21
2008	Arab Junior Championships	Radès, Tunisia	1st	100 metres	12.04
2008	Arab Junior Championships	Radès, Tunisia	1st	200 metres	24.39
2008	Asian Junior Championships	Jakarta, Indonesia	1st	400 m hurdles	57.85
2012	World Indoor Championships	Istanbul, Turkey	27th (q)	60 m hurdles	9.15
2012	Olympic Games	London, United Kingdom	DSQ	400 m hurdles	Doping
2015	Asian Championships	Wuhan, China	6th	400 m hurdles	58.68
2015	World Championships	Beijing, China	34th (q)	400 m hurdles	58.61
2016	Asian Indoor Championships	Doha, Qatar	4th	400 metres	55.73
2016	Olympic Games	Rio de Janeiro, Brazil	41 (q)	400 m hurdles	58.85
2023	Arab Games	Oran, Algeria	5th	100 m hurdles	14.11
2023	Arab Games	Oran, Algeria	5th	400 m hurdles	1:00.21
