= Sarah Bouaoudia =

Algerian heptathlete (born 1983)

Medal record

Women's athletics

Representing Algeria

African Championships
Bronze medal – third place	2002 Radès	4×400 m

Sarah Bouaoudia (born 13 August 1983) is a retired Algerian heptathlete.

As a heptathlete she won the gold medal at the 2003 Arab Championships, finished fourth at the 2003 All-Africa Games, won the gold medal at the 2004 Pan Arab Games and finished fifth at the 2005 Mediterranean Games.

In the high jump she won the 1998 Arab Junior Championships, the silver medal at the 1999 Pan Arab Games, won the bronze medal at the 2002 Arab Junior Championships, finished fourth at the 2003 All-Africa Games, finished fourteenth at the 2005 Universiade, won the bronze medal at the 2006 African Championships She also competed at the 1999 World Youth Championships without reaching the final.

In the long jump she won the silver medal at the 1998 Arab Junior Championships, the 2001 African Junior Championships, the bronze medal at the 1999 Pan Arab Games, the silver medal at the 2002 Arab Junior Championships, finished eleventh at the 2002 African Championships. She also competed at the 1999 World Youth Championships without reaching the final.

Her personal bests are 5691 points in the heptathlon, 1.85 metres in the high jump and 6.18 metres in the long jump, all achieved at the 2005 Mediterranean Games in Almería. 1.85 metres is the Algerian record.

Bouaoudia has also competed as a relay racer, in both 4 × 100 and 4 × 400 metres. She helped win gold in both events at the 1999 African Junior Championships. At the 2002 African Championships they finished third in the 4 × 400 metres, setting an Algerian record of 3:39.70 minutes. Gold in the 4 x 100 at the 2003 Arab Championships followed.
