= Hiba Omar =

Syrian discus thrower

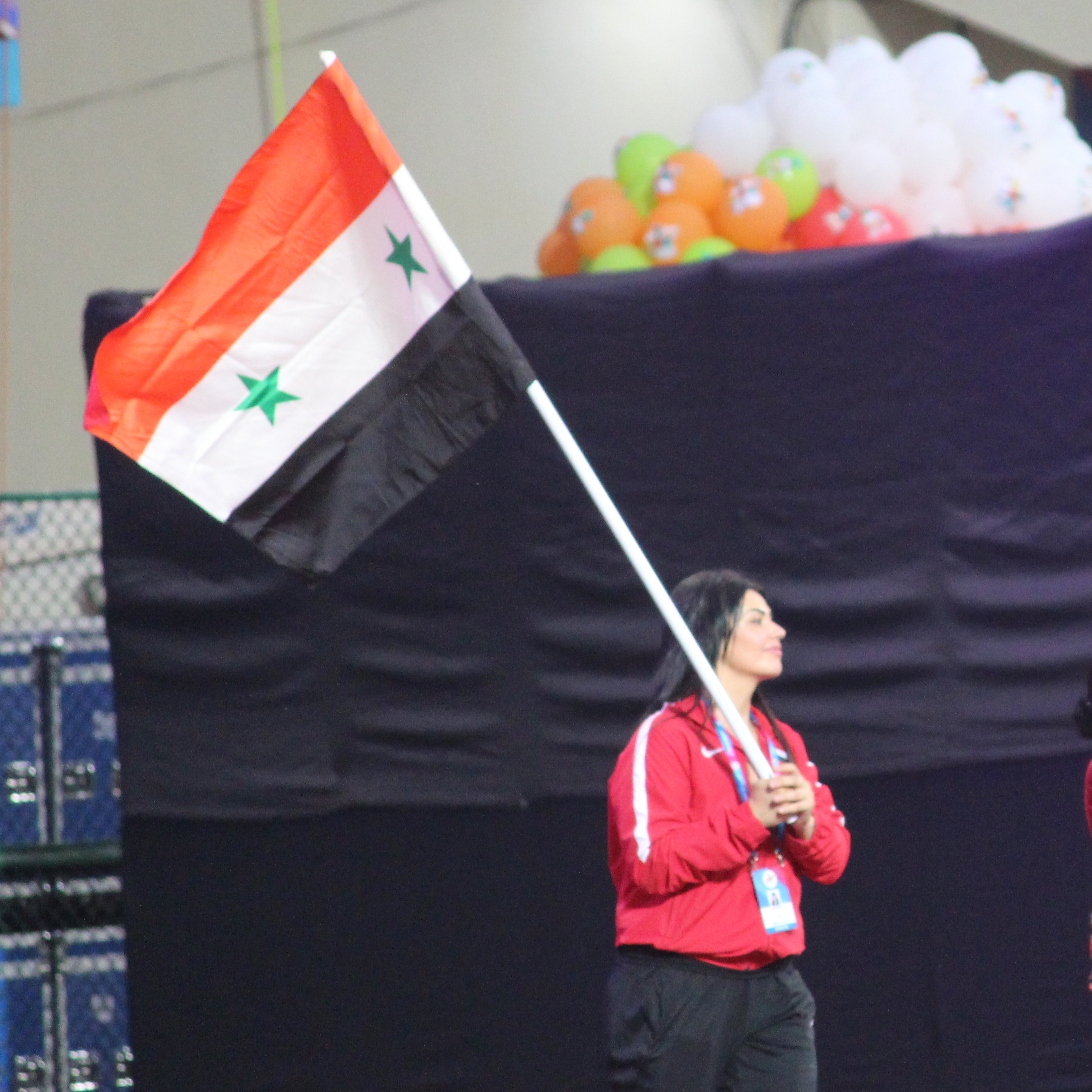
- Omar bearing the Syrian flag, opening ceremony of 22nd 2017 Asian Athletics Championships

Personal information
- Born: Hiba Omar; June 22, 1990 (age 36) Quneitra, Syria
- Height: 1.76 m (5 ft 9 1/2 in)
- Weight: 72 kg (159 lb)

Sport
- Country: Syria
- Sport: Athletics
- Events: Discus, Shot put
Medal record
Representing Syria
West Asian Championships
Silver medal – second place	2012 Dubai	Shot put
Bronze medal – third place	2012 Dubai	Discus throw
Arab Championships
Gold medal – first place	2009 Damascus	Discus throw
Bronze medal – third place	2007 Amman	Discus throw
Bronze medal – third place	2011 Al Ain	Discus throw
Bronze medal – third place	2011 Al Ain	Shot put

Hiba Omar (Arabic: هبة عمر; born 22 June 1990) is a Syrian athlete who competes in the discus and the shot put.

== Career ==
Omar was born in Quneitra which is near both Israel and Palestine in the Golan Heights. She was inspired by Ghada Shouaa who won a medal in Atlanta at the Olympics in 1996.

She is one of five athletes who train in Damascus which includes high jumper Majd Eddin Ghazal. At the Asian Athletics competition in 2017 she was sole athlete from her worn-torn country. She carried the flag and photos of this drew media attention. She gave guarded interviews to foreign journalists after her manager was assured that the purpose of the interviews was not political. Hiba refused to answer questions about politics and assured the press that she had every facility for training in Syria.

She threw 13.69 metre in the shot put in Thailand in 2012 and she made a discus throw of 50.44 in Cairo in 2018.

== Personal bests ==
Outdoor

- Shot put – 13.69 (2012)
- Discus throw – 50.44 (2018)

Indoor

- Shot put – 11.86 (2010)

== Competition record ==
Year	Competition	Venue	Position	Event	Notes
Representing Syria
2004	Arab Junior Championships	Damascus, Syria	2nd	Javelin	30.35
2004	Arab Junior Championships	Damascus, Syria	3rd	Discus throw	36.90
2005	World Youth Championships	Marrakesh, Morocco	15th (q)	Discus throw	35.92
2006	Arab Junior Championships	Cairo, Egypt	3rd	Shot put	11.87
2006	Arab Junior Championships	Cairo, Egypt	3rd	Discus throw	38.20
2007	Arab Championships	Amman, Jordan	3rd	Discus throw	41.86
2007	Pan Arab Games	Cairo, Egypt	4th	Shot put	12.31
2007	Pan Arab Games	Cairo, Egypt	4th	Discus throw	38.49
2009	Arab Championships	Damascus, Syria	1st	Discus throw	43.67
2010	Asian Indoor Championships	Tehran, Iran	5th	Shot put	11.86
2010	West Asian Championships	Aleppo, Syria	2nd	Shot put	11.50 m
2010	West Asian Championships	Aleppo, Syria	1st	Discus throw	38.84 m
2011	Arab Championships	Al Ain, UAE	3rd	Shot put	13.46
2011	Arab Championships	Al Ain, UAE	3rd	Discus throw	42.27
2012	West Asian Championships	Dubai, UAE	2nd	Shot put	12.64
2012	West Asian Championships	Dubai, UAE	3rd	Discus throw	40.02
2014	Asian Games	Incheon, South Korea	8th	Discus throw	45.81
2017	Islamic Solidarity Games	Baku, Azerbaijan	7th	Shot put	12.78
2017	Islamic Solidarity Games	Baku, Azerbaijan	5th	Discus throw	48.27
2017	Asian Championships	Bhubaneshwar, India	10th	Discus throw	43.82
