= Aadam Ismaeel Khamis =

Bahraini-Kenyan long-distance runner (born 1989)

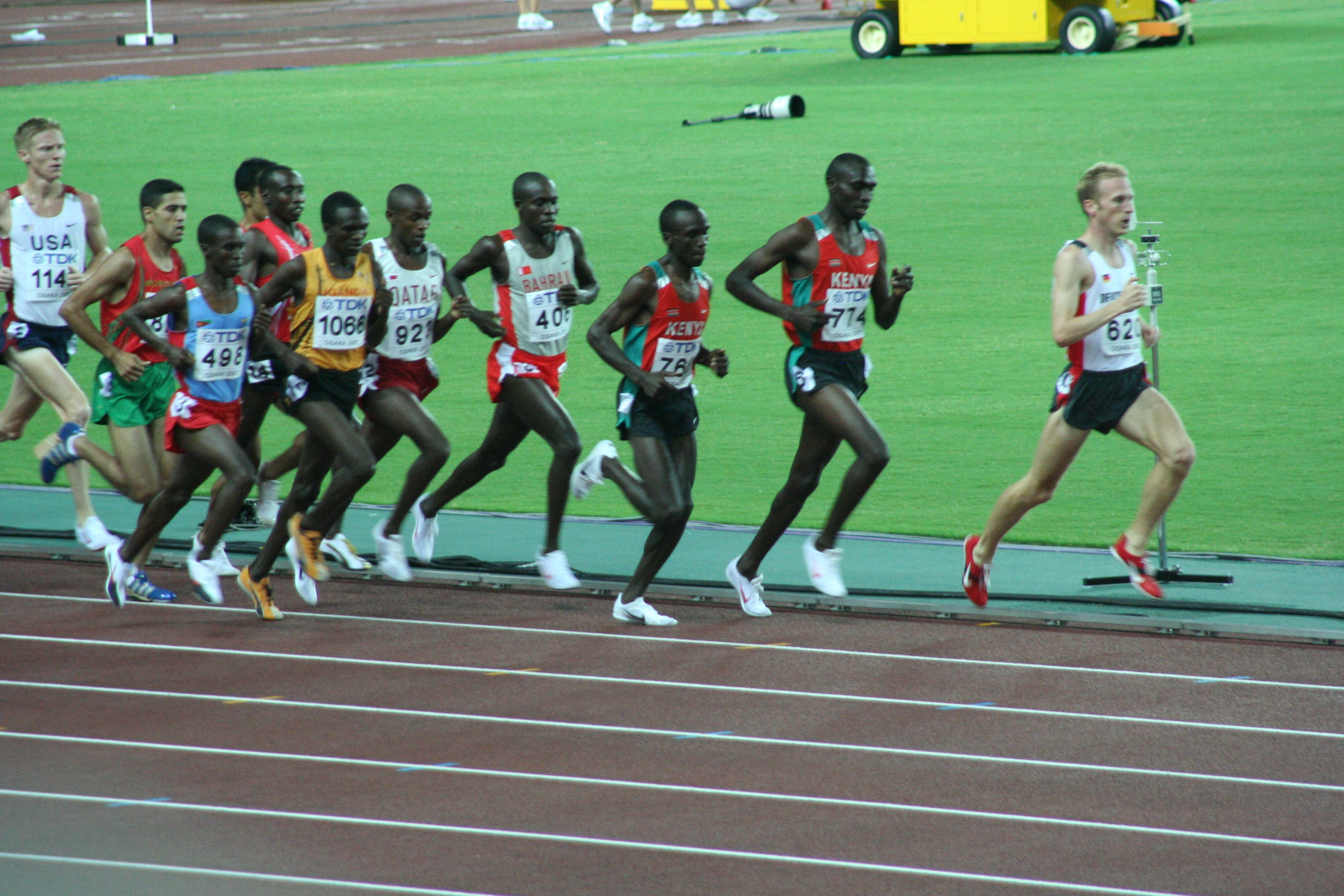
- World Athletics Championships 2007 in Osaka - Scene from heat 2 of the qualification round of the men*s 5000 metres: Matthew Tegenkamp, Mourad Marofit, Ali Abdalla, Dieudonné Disi, Stephen Kiprotich, Felix Kikwai Kibore, Aadam Ismaeel Khamis, Eliud Kipchoge, Benjamin Limo, Jan Fitschen

Personal information
- Born: 12 February 1989 (age 37)
Medal record
Men's athletics
Representing Bahrain
Asian Games
Bronze medal – third place	Doha 2006	10,000 m
Asian Indoor Championships
Bronze medal – third place	2006 Pattaya	3000 m

Aadam Ismaeel Khamis (born Hosea Kosgei; Arabic: آدم خميس إسماعيل; born 12 February 1989) is a Bahraini-Kenyan long-distance runner. He represents Bahrain after his switch from Kenya.

== Biography ==
According to Bahraini officials, Kosgei was born on 12 February 1989, in Kenya. Like fellow Bahraini runners Belal Mansoor Ali and Tareq Mubarak Taher, his age is surrounded by controversy. In August 2005, the IAAF opened an investigation on their ages which was still ongoing as of March 2007.

In 2006, Khamis won a bronze medal over 3000 metres at the Asian Indoor Athletics Championships. At the World Junior Championships in Beijing the same year he won a bronze in 10,000 metres and finished fifth in 5000 metres. The IAAF Council opened an investigatory disciplinary file on Khamis the day after his 5000 m finish.
