= Olfa Hamdi =

Tunisian politician and businesswoman

- ألفة الحامدي
- Born: 15 July 1988 (age 38); Gafsa, Tunisia
- Citizenship: Tunisian/American
- Education: École Centrale de Lille; University of Texas at Austin

Olfa Hamdi (Arabic: ألفة الحامدي; born 15 July 1988) is a Tunisian center-right politician and businesswoman born in the city of Gafsa in southern Tunisia. She is an international expert in capital project management. She previously held the position of President and general manager of Tunisian Airlines.

She is the founder and elected president of the Third Republic Party of Tunisia.

== Biography ==
Olfa received her primary and secondary education in Tunisia and passed the General Secondary School exam with distinction, enabling her to be among the top in The Republic. Then, thanks to a scholarship from The Tunisian State, she went to Paris and Lille in France where she studied there and obtained a Master's degree in engineering, from Centrale Lille, and after that she headed to the United States of America, where she continued her studies at University of Texas Austin, where she obtained a master's degree in Project Management major.

== Professional career ==
Olfa has worked on several projects in United States. Then she founded Concord Technology Enterprises. She is considered an international expert in major project management, and she invented the AWP technology. It is a methodology and technique that has been adopted internationally to improve the profitability of major projects by major international companies such as ExxonMobil. She also assumed the position of Executive Director of the Advanced Work Packaging Institute, and worked for a period in Tunisia within the Ministry of National Defense at the Supreme Defense Institute as a teacher and lecturer in project management within the Staff School of the Ministry.

== President of Tunisair ==
She was appointed on January 4, 2021 as head of Tunisian Airlines, making her the third woman to hold the position after Salwa Al-Sagheer and Sarah Rajab. After disagreements between her and The Tunisian General Labor Union on the reform path of the airline, She was removed from her position on February 22, 2021.

== Political career ==
Olfa Hamdi was a presidential candidate in the 2024 presidential election of Tunisia. She founded and leads the Third Republic Party of Tunisia. Olfa Hamdi was a professor in the Tunisian Military. In February 2026, she was detained at the airport shortly after disembarking a flight. Opposition figures described her arrest as part of a crackdown on dissent.
