= Under-20 athletics =

Category of athletics for athletes under the age of 20

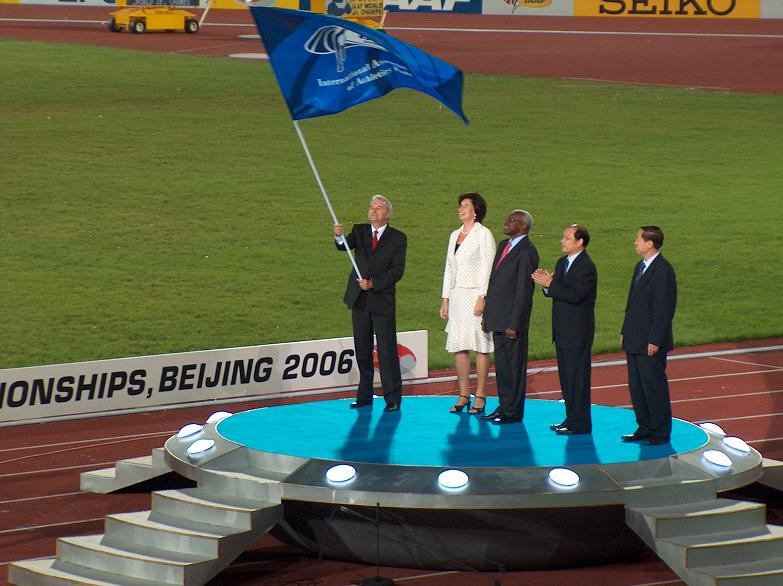
2006 World Junior Athletics - Beijing

Junior is a category of athletics in which athletes compete under the age of 20 years. Countries all around the world compete in athletics. World Junior Athletics Competitions are held every two years which contain the best junior competitors in the world.

== Description and development ==
The principle behind the category is to introduce young people into athletics. Participators in the competitions in this class may be athletes who have not completed their twentieth birthday by 31 December of the year the competition occurs. That is, the calendar year in which the competition begins minus the calendar year of an athlete's birth is less than 20.

== Competitions ==
=== Championships ===
- World Athletics U20 Championships, organized by the IAAF every 2 years
- European Athletics U20 Championships, organized by the EAA every 2 years
- African Junior Athletics Championships
- Asian Junior Athletics Championships
- Central American and Caribbean Junior Championships in Athletics
- Pan American U20 Athletics Championships
- Ibero-American U20 Championships in Athletics
- Oceania Junior Athletics Championships, organized by the OAA every 2 years

=== Games ===
- IWAS World Junior Games

== See also ==
- List of world under-20 records in athletics
- International Association of Athletics Federations
- European Athletic Association
- Under-18 athletics
- Under-23 athletics
