= 2007 Arab Youth Athletics Championships =

2nd Arab Youth Athletics Championships
- Dates: 27–29 June
- Host city: Damascus, Syria
- Level: Youth
- Events: 39

The 2007 Arab Youth Athletics Championships was the second edition of the international athletics competition for under-18 athletes from Arab countries. Organised by the Arab Athletic Federation, it took place in the Syrian capital of Damascus from 27–29 June. A total of thirty-nine events were contested, of which 20 by male and 19 by female athletes, matching the programme of the 2007 World Youth Championships in Athletics bar the exclusion of a girls' steeplechase event.

Four athletes achieved individual doubles at the tournament. On the boys' side, Saudi athlete Hamada Al-Bishi achieved a novel 100 metres/400 metre hurdles double, Sudan's Awad El Karim Makki took both 200 metres and 400 metres titles, and Ismail Al Saffar of Kuwait took both gold medals in the horizontal jumps. The sole girl to win two individual titles was Souheir Bouali of Algeria, who won both short sprints. She went on to become a senior champion at the 2013 Arab Athletics Championships six years later.

Morocco, which had dominated the inaugural edition in 2004, was absent from the competition. Egypt topped the medal table with eight golds among its haul of 21 medals. Sudan achieved the second highest tally of gold medals with six. The host nation Syria won the most overall medals with 22 and ranked joint-third on gold medals with five – a number also reached by both Algeria and Tunisia. Fourteen nations reached the medal table.

Unlike some of the athletes of the previous edition, no medallists in Damascus reached the podium at the following World Youth Championships. Sudan's sprint champion Makki and boys' discus throw winner Hamid Mansour went on to win medals at the 2009 World Youth Championships, however.

== Medal summary ==
=== Men ===
| Event | Gold | | Silver | | Bronze | |
|---|---|---|---|---|---|---|
| 100 metres | Hamada Al-Bishi (KSA) | 10.94 | Abdelhadi Bouchagour (ALG) | 11.02 | Naji Daghar (LIB) | 11.10 |
| 200 metres | Awad El Karim Makki (SUD) | 22.14 | Nour Selk (SUD) | 22.15 | Abdelhadi Bouchagour (ALG) | 22.47 |
| 400 metres | Awad El Karim Makki (SUD) | 48.55 | Adel Al Nasser (KSA) | 48.58 | Hassan Fares Hmam (OMN) | 49.33 |
| 800 metres | Marouane Chehibi (TUN) | 1:54.62 | Choul Nouaouiel (SUD) | 1:55.65 | Bilel Kefi (ALG) | 1:58.07 |
| 1500 metres | Moufli Zayati (ALG) | 4:04.02 | Boubaker Esseddik Mcharraf (ALG) | 4:06.99 | Mdhafer Aboud (KSA) | 4:12.08 |
| 3000 metres | Ali Abderrahim (YEM) | 9:07.86 | Mohamed Walid Jarallah (YEM) | 9:09.79 | Yazen Al Cheikh (JOR) | 9:14.56 |
| 110 metres hurdles | Anouar Ouchana (SYR) | 13.79 | Jassem Al Sabagha (KUW) | 14.64 | Ahmed Mahmoud Mohamed (EGY) | 14.72 |
| 400 metres hurdles | Hamada Al-Bishi (KSA) | 52.57 | Matoukel Younes (SUD) | 52.64 | Idriss Sassi (TUN) | 53.54 |
| 2000 metres steeplechase | Mohamed Amin Mohsen (ALG) | 5:57.70 | Ali Aboud (KSA) | 6:11.80 | Mouaad Belli (QAT) | 6:12.11 |
| 1000 metres medley relay | Saudi Arabia (KSA); Hamada Al-Bishi; D. Sakii; Adel Al Nasser; Fares Cherahili | 1:56.47 | Sudan (SUD); Nour Selk; Awad El Karim Makki; Matoukel Younes; Choul Nouaouiel | 1:56.73 | Iraq (IRQ); Majid Fathallah; Hayder Hussein; Aymen Jassem; Cherif Arkane | 1:56.78 |
| 10,000 m walk | Jebril Rahma Khan (QAT) | 45:51.9 | Abdallah Said (SYR) | 50:18.5 | Maher Zidane (SYR) | 51:16.3 |
| High jump | Mohamed Aboutaleb (EGY) | 2.07 m | Selmane Manai (QAT) | 2.04 m | Ibrahim Siar (KUW) | 2.01 m |
| Pole vault | Doij Am Okbi (KSA) | 4.71 m | Mohamed Mella Khalef (SYR) | 4.50 m | Mohamed Ahmed Manai (QAT) | 4.10 m |
| Long jump | Ismail Al Saffar (KUW) | 7.13 m | Mohamed Mella Khalef (SYR) | 6.62 m | Houssem Al Akel (SYR) | 6.40 m |
| Triple jump | Ismail Al Saffar (KUW) | 15.11 m | Ahmed Faraj (KSA) | 14.52 m | Mohamed Al Amri (LBA) | 14.38 m w |
| Shot put | Mohamed Abdelmonaam Hmam (EGY) | 17.45 m | Hamid Mansour (SYR) | 17.00 m | Moussaab Aicha (SYR) | 15.88 m |
| Discus throw | Hamid Mansour (SYR) | 59.53 m | Mechaal El Said (KUW) | 49.68 m | Mohamed Mohamed Saad (EGY) | 49.16 m |
| Hammer throw | Mohamed Alaa El Acheri (EGY) | 71.80 m | Abdelhamid El Dachti (KUW) | 64.60 m | Ameur Addi Ahmed (QAT) | 59.19 m |
| Javelin throw | Moez Dhahri (TUN) | 61.17 m | Samir Ahmed Mohamed (EGY) | 59.33 m | Mohamed Anouar Hamed (SUD) | 58.36 m |
| Octathlon | Ahmed Mokbali Abdallah (OMN) | 5316 pts | Aymen Hemissi (TUN) | 5178 pts | Ali Bouflit (ALG) | 5128 pts |

=== Women ===
| Event | Gold | | Silver | | Bronze | |
|---|---|---|---|---|---|---|
| 100 metres | Souheir Bouali (ALG) | 11.84 | Amira Mohamed Fawzi (EGY) | 12.56 | Saoussen Dellagi (TUN) | 12.85 |
| 200 metres | Souheir Bouali (ALG) | 23.96 | Saoussen Dellagi (TUN) | 25.82 | Emna Baccar (SUD) | 26.03 |
| 400 metres | Emna Baccar (SUD) | 57.75 | Chaima Fouad Chiheb (EGY) | 59.72 | Bayan Issam (JOR) | 60.72 |
| 800 metres | Safa Jemmali (TUN) | 2:15.20 | Alouia Klai (SUD) | 2:16.24 | Houcien Bayoudi (ALG) | 2:23.53 |
| 1500 metres | Ahsna Jabril (SUD) | 4:32.77 | Amina Borklit (ALG) | 4:48.69 | Najoua Baccar (SYR) | 5:16.63 |
| 3000 metres | Baraa Marouane (JOR) | 11:05.99 | Arouba Al Amou (SYR) | 12:12.28 | Samara Khazaal (IRQ) | 12:17.76 |
| 100 metres hurdles | Fadoua Bouhat (SYR) | 13.84 | Selma Abou Al Hassen Edam (EGY) | 13.92 | Minas Slimane (SYR) | 15.98 |
| 400 metres hurdles^{[nb1]} | Mounassek Yakoub (SUD) | 64.1 | Chaima Fouad Hicham (EGY) | 67.7 | Abir Al Habari (JOR) | 71.7 |
| 1000 metres medley relay | Sudan (SUD); Mounassek Yakoub; Safa Abdelhamid; Emna Baccar; Alouia Klai | 2:18.59 | Algeria (ALG); Zineb Ouzani; Yousra Ranai; Houcien Bayoudi; Souhir Bouali | 2:19.96 | Syria (SYR); Minas Slimane; Fadoua Boudhat; Mariem Fadhel; Soulefa Mohamed | 2:28.26 |
| 5000 m walk | Olfa Hamdi (TUN) | 26:30.8 | Sarra Arrouk (SYR) | 26:35.9 | Jihed Mohamed Adel (EGY) | 27:54.8 |
| High jump | Rahma Miled (TUN) | 1.55 m | Yousra Ranai (ALG) | 1.52 m | Rihem Chayed (SYR) | 1.49 m |
| Pole vault | Diana Al Tabaa Ahmed (EGY) | 3.25 m | Rihem Chiha (SYR) | 2.70 m | Zineb Ouzani (ALG) | 2.50 m |
| Long jump | Hedir Jabrouni (EGY) | 5.58 m | Marah Dalla (SYR) | 5.37 m | Rahma Miled (TUN) | 5.10 m |
| Triple jump | Fadoua Boudhat (SYR) | 12.70 m | Fatma El Ahmadi (TUN) | 11.80 m | Hedir Jabrouni (EGY) | 11.45 m |
| Shot put | Oula Attia Mohamed (EGY) | 13.00 m | Hiba Omar (SYR) | 12.77 m | Bouzira Zoubaa (ALG) | 11.54 m |
| Discus throw | Hiba Omar (SYR) | 40.27 m | Besnet Ibrahim Mohamed (EGY) | 31.42 m | Fatma Chaabane (EGY) | 30.59 m |
| Hammer throw | Nihed Fehmi Kamel (EGY) | 48.16 m | Rina Taha Ahmed (EGY) | 47.19 m | Bouzira Zoubaa (ALG) | 44.95 m |
| Javelin throw | Hiba Mahmoud Alaa (EGY) | 40.99 m | Souad Mazzar (ALG) | 36.53 m | Anouare Jarboua (SYR) | 32.09 m |
| Heptathlon | Rania Chokri (JOR) | 3588 pts | Hafidha Mokhtari (ALG) | 3525 pts | Radhoua Fares Fethi (EGY) | 2920 pts |

- ^{nb2} The girls' hurdles event was only timed to the tenth of a second, rather than the standard hundredths, due to technical limitations.

== Medal table ==
* Host nation (Syria)

| Rank | Nation | Gold | Silver | Bronze | Total |
|---|---|---|---|---|---|
| 1 | Egypt | 8 | 7 | 6 | 21 |
| 2 | Sudan | 6 | 5 | 2 | 13 |
| 3 | Syria* | 5 | 9 | 8 | 22 |
| 4 | Algeria | 5 | 6 | 7 | 18 |
| 5 | Tunisia | 5 | 4 | 3 | 12 |
| 6 | Saudi Arabia | 4 | 3 | 1 | 8 |
| 7 | Kuwait | 2 | 3 | 1 | 6 |
| 8 | Qatar | 1 | 1 | 3 | 5 |
| 9 | Yemen | 1 | 1 | 0 | 2 |
| 10 | Jordan | 1 | 0 | 3 | 4 |
| 11 | Oman | 1 | 0 | 1 | 2 |
| 12 | Iraq | 0 | 0 | 2 | 2 |
| 13 | Lebanon | 0 | 0 | 1 | 1 |
| 13 | Libya | 0 | 0 | 1 | 1 |
| Totals (14 entries) | | 39 | 39 | 39 | 117 |
