= 2013 Arab Youth Athletics Championships =

4th Arab Youth Athletics Championships
- Dates: 21–23 June
- Host city: Cairo, Egypt
- Level: Youth
- Events: 40
- Participation: 14 nations
- Records set: 10 championship records

The 2013 Arab Youth Athletics Championships was the fourth edition of the international athletics competition for under-18 athletes from Arab countries. Organised by the Arab Athletic Federation, it took place in the Egyptian capital Cairo from 21–23 June. A total of forty events were contested, of which 20 by male and 20 by female athletes. The girls' steeplechase was contested for the first time, making the programme match that of the 2013 World Youth Championships in Athletics. The racewalking events were held on roads, rather than the usual track surface.

Egypt topped the medal table for a third straight edition through a total of 42 medals, thirteen of them gold. Algeria also won thirteen gold medals and had the second-highest total with 25. Tunisia ranked third with seven golds in its haul of 17, while Qatar was the next most successful nation with four golds in a total of twelve. Out of the fourteen participating nations, twelve of them reached the medal table. The competition had reduced participation, with Sudan, Syria, Jordan and all absent and Saudi Arabia sending a smaller contingent as compared to the 2009 edition, although Bahrain and Palestine returned at this event. Regional athletics power Morocco continued its hiatus since the first edition.

Three athletes completed individual doubles at the competition, all of them from the boys' side. Mahmoud Hamoudi won both the 100 metres and 200 metres, becoming the second male to do so after Abdullah Al-Sooli (2004). His Algerian teammate Yasser Mohamed Tahar Triki won both the long jump and triple jump, repeating the 2007 achievement by Ismail Al Saffar. Egypt's Mohamed Magdi Hamza claimed both the shot put and discus throw titles – a double Hamid Mansour had first completed in 2009.

A total of ten new championship records were set at the competition. This included Hamza's shot put record of 21.22 m (69 ft 7 1/4 in), which improved the previous mark by over three metres and ranked him the fourth best youth athlete in the world that year. Qatar sent its first female athlete, Sara Al Manai Ahmed, to the competition and she was runner-up in the javelin. Arab youth throws champion Mohamed Magdi Hamza went on to take a bronze medal at the 2013 World Youth Championships later that year.

== Medal summary ==
=== Men ===
Event	Gold		Silver		Bronze	
100 metres	Mahmoud Hamoudi (ALG)	10.88 CR	Khalifa Al Mtri Mechaal (KUW)	10.89	Abdeslam Bouchamia (ALG)	10.98
200 metres	Mahmoud Hamoudi (ALG)	22.04	Abdeslam Bouchamia (ALG)	22.33	Rabie Al Kouari Ibrahim (QAT)	22.37
400 metres	Nasser Abbes Mohamed (QAT)	47.81	Khalifa Said Ibrahim (UAE)	49.39	Ziad Ali (KSA)	50.09
800 metres	Sabri Mohamed Salem (EGY)	1:53.94	Mohamed Adem (QAT)	1:54.38	Riadh Chenini (TUN)	1:55.26
1500 metres	Youcef Belkdam (ALG)	3:53.45	Aboubaker Abdallah Jassem (QAT)	3:54.02	Talel Khalfi (TUN)	3:57.21
3000 metres	Sofiane Cherni (TUN)	8:40.62	Toufik Bouziane (ALG)	8:48.63	Idriss Youssef Moussa (QAT)	8:59.69
110 metres hurdles	Abdallah Attiq (QAT)	14.23	Amine Bouanani (ALG)	14.27	Omar Tarek (EGY)	14.50
400 metres hurdles	Mohamed Fares Jelassi (TUN)	52.58	Khaled Chehrani Masfar Mohamed (QAT)	54.57	Raouf Jedid (TUN)	54.59
2000 metres steeplechase	Afnes Jepnato Ruto (BHR)	5:47.44	Salah Slama (EGY)	5:47.48	Nabil Romdhane Allah Mohamed (QAT)	6:00.54
1000 metres medley relay	Qatar (QAT); Abdallah Attiq; Rabie Al Kouari Ibrahim; Nasser Abbes Mohamed; M. Al Nour	1:56.40	Algeria (ALG); Mahmoud Hamoudi; Abdeslam Bouchamia; Amine Bouanani; Sofiane Titouh	1:59.12	Oman (OMN); Amjed Balbouchi; Seif Al Abdelli; Younes Al Akhzami; Adnen Al Kahli	2:00.56
10 km walk	Aabdeltouab Islem Abdelkhalek (EGY)	47:51.04	Hamed Jemii Said Ali (UAE)	48:40.91	Mostafa Abderrazak (IRQ)	49:10.90
High jump	Mohamed Amine Fodil (ALG)	2.02 m	Hussein Hassen Fellah (IRQ)	1.99 m	Patrick Ziad Hana (LIB)	1.96 m
Pole vault	Seifeddine Mejri (TUN)	4.20 m	Ali Abed Zid Mohamed (IRQ)	4.00 m	Oussama ben Chedli Nasri (TUN)	3.80 m
Long jump	Yasser Mohamed Tahar Triki (ALG)	7.28 m	Ali Bari Ameur (IRQ)	6.81 m	Mohamed Abdelhassib Achraf (EGY)	6.50 m
Triple jump	Yasser Mohamed Tahar Triki (ALG)	15.06 m	Patrick Ziad Hana (LIB)	14.31 m	Ali Bari Ameur (IRQ)	14.02 m
Shot put	Mohamed Magdi Hamza (EGY)	21.22 m CR	Ahmed Salem Adel Cherif (EGY)	19.04 m	Alain Saad (LIB)	14.86 m
Discus throw	Mohamed Magdi Hamza (EGY)	58.62 m	Ahmed Salem Adel Cherif (EGY)	55.98 m	Zekri Lahmar Adel (LBA)	49.75 m
Hammer throw	Ahmed Al Sifi Amjed (QAT)	73.84 m CR	Ahmed Ismail Tarek (EGY)	69.39 m	Selim Faissal Salah (QAT)	62.82 m
Javelin throw	Al Fakher Rachid Hafedh Dhou (IRQ)	61.87 m	Fehmi Youssef Fehmi Talaa (EGY)	60.55 m	Saad Said Al Kasmi Mohamed Ibrahim (EGY)	56.33 m
Octathlon	Amir Boukenfir (ALG)	5601 pts	Mostafa Romdhane Mohamed (EGY)	5497 pts	Karim Mohamed Houssem (EGY)	4901 pts

=== Women ===
Event	Gold		Silver		Bronze	
100 metres (wind: +2.2 m/s)	Basnet Aouadh Mohamed (EGY)	12.26	Zouaouia Berhil (ALG)	12.34	Loubna Lina Bensiali (ALG)	12.64
200 metres	Zouaouia Berhil (ALG)	24.68	Basnet Aouadh Mohamed (EGY)	24.71	Madhouia Abdallah Saad (KUW)	25.98
400 metres	Nourine Mahmoud Hassen (EGY)	59.52	Chiraz Gomni (TUN)	59.88	Al Zhora Thamer Abderrazak (IRQ)	61.93
800 metres	Sabrina Hocine (ALG)	2:19.03	Fetma Nejib (EGY)	2:20.51	Eya Ghrib Mahmoud (EGY)	2:23.53
1500 metres	Rima Chenah (ALG)	4:34.99	Hela Hamdi (TUN)	4:48.44	Oujden Sebai Al Mongi (LBA)	5:04.71
3000 metres	Hela Abrougui (TUN)	10:35.25	Nouha Mohamed Ahmed (EGY)	11:00.03	Nadia Badr Achraf (EGY)	11:13.28
100 metres hurdles	Lina Jaber Amrou (EGY)	13.97	Hamida Zitouni (ALG)	14.05	Maroua Selmi (ALG)	14.26
400 metres hurdles	Samah Ahmed (TUN)	68.67	Rym Ahmed Mohamed Naji (EGY)	76.25	Only two finishers	
2000 metres steeplechase	Rosemary Mumo Katua (BHR)	6:46.51 CR	Maroua Bouzayani (TUN)	7:02.65	Najoua Youssef Al Sid Ali (EGY)	8:02.16
1000 metres medley relay	Algeria (ALG); Sarah Nazef; Loubna Lina Bensiali; Zouaoui Berhil; Sabrina Hocine	2:16.98	Egypt (EGY); Lina Jaber Amrou; Dina Sadok Chaker Walid; Basnet Aouadh Mohamed; Nourine Mahmoud Hassen	2:23.85	Tunisia (TUN); Khaoula Kastouri; Samah Ahmed; Selma ben Limam; Chiraz Gomni	2:26.25
10 km walk	Chahinez Nasri (TUN)	24:44.89 CR	Rihab Mansouri (TUN)	25:28.86	Amira Mahmoud Zinhem (EGY)	26:10.77
High jump	Liza Madouni (ALG)	1.60 m	Yousra Araar (ALG)	1.60 m	Rihem Ahmed Khamel Hamdi (EGY)	1.55 m
Pole vault	Fadoua Ferchichi (TUN)	2.80 m	Racha Al Melki Mohamed (OMN)	2.70 m	Nada Kamel Zine Eddine (EGY)	2.60 m
Long jump	Israe Samir Mohamed (EGY)	5.72 m CR	Selma Abdelhamid Ahmed Jamel (EGY)	5.50 m	Sarah Nazef (ALG)	5.27 m
Triple jump	Selmi Kawter (ALG)	12.34 m	Israe Samir Mohamed (EGY)	11.89 m	Ines Abdelfateh Mejdi (EGY)	11.87 m
Shot put	Noura Jassem (BHR)	15.24 m CR	Amira Sid Mahmoud Khaled (EGY)	14.06 m	Raghed Al Zbidi (OMN)	12.80 m
Discus throw	Amira Sid Mahmoud Khaled (EGY)	44.48 m CR	Noura Jassem (BHR)	39.52 m	Fatma Al Adli Abda Khaled (EGY)	38.16 m
Hammer throw	Israe Mostafa Mohamed (EGY)	59.84 m CR	Eya Sid Masr (EGY)	54.80 m	Ryma Zeghnoun (ALG)	46.47 m
Javelin throw	Selma Chemseddine Mohsen (EGY)	37.30 m	Sara Al Manai Ahmed (QAT)	36.27 m	Eya Al Said Taoufik Ahmed (EGY)	35.22 m
Heptathlon	Riham Kamel Hamdi (EGY)	4439 pts CR	Selma ben Limam (TUN)	3554 pts	Roanne Bahader Barouiz (EGY)	3297 pts

== Medal table ==
* Host nation (Egypt)

Rank	Nation	Gold	Silver	Bronze	Total
1	Tunisia	89	5	93	187
2	Egypt	13	15	14	42
3	Algeria	13	7	0	20
4	Qatar	4	4	4	12
5	Bahrain	2	1	0	3
6	Iraq	1	3	3	7
7	United Arab Emirates	0	2	0	2
8	Lebanon	0	1	2	3
8	Oman	0	1	2	3
10	Kuwait	0	1	1	2
11	Libya	0	0	2	2
12	Saudi Arabia	0	0	1	1
Totals (12 entries)		122	40	122	284

== Participation ==
- Algeria
- Bahrain
- Egypt
- Iraq
- Kuwait
- Lebanon
- Libya
- Oman
- Palestine
- Qatar
- Saudi Arabia
- Tunisia
- United Arab Emirates
- Yemen
- Absentees included Jordan, Morocco, Sudan, and Syria.
