= 2017 Arab Youth Athletics Championships =

6th Arab Youth Athletics Championships
- Dates: 2–4 November
- Host city: Radès, Tunisia
- Level: Youth
- Events: 40
- Participation: 13 nations

The 2017 Arab Youth Athletics Championships was the sixth edition of the international athletics competition for under-18 athletes from Arab countries. Organised by the Arab Athletic Federation, it took place in Radès, Tunisia from 2–4 November. A total of forty events were contested, of which 20 by male and 20 by female athletes.

== Medal summary ==
=== Men ===
Event	Gold		Silver		Bronze	
100 metres	Mohammed Mahdi Zekraoui (ALG)	10.60	Ahmed Mohanna Al Marwani (KSA)	10.83	Abdu Ahmed Marzouk (KSA)	10.85
200 metres	Mohammed Mahdi Zekraoui (ALG)	21.39	Ahmed Mohanna Al Marwani (KSA)	21.77	Yasser Yahya Hazazi (KSA)	22.11
400 metres	Abdullah Ayed Al Subaie (KSA)	49.25	Hassan Abidi (TUN)	49.66	Rami Balti (TUN)	49.72
800 metres	Ashraf Zuhair (MAR)	1:53.96	Oussama Cherrad (ALG)	1:54.08	Abdullah Muzlib (MAR)	1:54.87
1500 metres	Adil Mashoury (MAR)	3:56.68	Anas Al Sai (MAR)	3:57.18	Osama Sulaimani (TUN)	3:57.78
3000 metres	Sherif Almtawla (JOR)	8:34.77	Abdul Ella Zuhair (MAR)	8:37.54	Mohamed Amin Gedi (TUN)	8:44.39
110 metres hurdles (wind: -3.6 m/s)	Mohamed Badr Al Enezi (KUW)	14.28	Hicham El Bahri Bekkouche (ALG)	14.41	Osama Hami (MAR)	14.58
400 metres hurdles	Osama Hami (MAR)	53.33	Mohamed Dhaithm Al Maawi (KSA)	54.68	Ahmed Shamam (TUN)	54.99
2000 metres steeplechase	Hamza Sakhmani (MAR)	5:56.62	Hamdani Benahmed (ALG)	5:57.77	Ahmed Saif Eddin Al Qadri (TUN)	6:05.73
1000 metres medley relay	Algeria (ALG)	1:56.13	Saudi Arabia (KSA)	1:56.37	Tunisia (TUN)	1:57.14
10000 metres track walk	Raed Al Oreibi (TUN)	47:40.39	Mujahid Altlili (TUN)	47:57.96	Nabil Akhour (MAR)	48:11.21
High jump	Yasin Hajjaji (MAR)	1.94 m	Hussein Nasser Al Shawaker (KSA)	1.94 m	Abdeghani Tebani (ALG)	1.92 m
Pole vault	Ali Abdul Karim Naciri (KSA)	4.20 m	Reda Boudechiche (ALG)	4.00 m	Wael Belhadj Kahlifa (TUN)	3.70 m
Long jump	Mohamed Amin Al Fahm (TUN)	6.80 m	Yasin Al Rahmani (MAR)	6.79 m	Mohamed Essam Saif (KUW)	6.74 m
Triple jump	Ali Abdullah Al Salah (KSA)	14.05 m	Diaa Qatoul (TUN)	14.03 m	Yasin Al Rahmani (MAR)	13.81 m
Shot put	Ali Mustafa Al Mubarak (KSA)	16.96 m	Hussein Al Wazzan (KUW)	15.84 m	Abdel Wahed Qamrawi (MAR)	14.79 m
Discus throw	Mohamed Baqer Ahmed Mohamed (IRQ)	50.57 m	Jihad Al Salhi (TUN)	49.50 m	Abdul Aziz Bilal (KUW)	46.98 m
Hammer throw	Murtada Bo Zian (TUN)	60.58 m	Abdul Rahman Al Jazzaf (KUW)	58.28 m	Muhannad bin hareb Al Omrani (OMN)	57.76 m
Javelin throw	Abdul Majid Sultan Al Subaie (KSA)	55.68 m	Abdul Aziz Bilal (KUW)	55.14 m	Walid Al Makeni (TUN)	54.64 m
Decathlon	Hussein Ali Karam (IRQ)	5686 pts	Mohamed Hassan Al Dabbous (KSA)	5457 pts	Amine Taourirt (ALG)	5437 pts

=== Women ===
Event	Gold		Silver		Bronze	
100 metres (wind: -1.1 m/s)	Loubna Benhadja (ALG)	12.79	Djihane Manana Benselka (ALG)	12.93	Yasmine Youssef Fares (IRQ)	13.11
200 metres	Alia Bouchnak (JOR)	25.13	Sarah Al Hashimi (MAR)	25.68	Fatima Rezeeq (TUN)	25.80
400 metres	Alia Bouchnak (JOR)	56.72	Fatima Rezeeq (TUN)	57.30	Iman Al Nakhli (MAR)	59.58
800 metres	Shaima Ismail (MAR)	2:22:36	Aya Al Aridi (TUN)	2:22.43	Yamina Dahmani (ALG)	2:23:34
1500 metres	Yasmine Bedkan (MAR)	4:51.87	Khadidja Habbeche (ALG)	4:55.13	Sirine Amraoui (TUN)	5:03.81
3000 metres	Suhaila Butar (MAR)	10:32.56	Saka Al Makeni (TUN)	11:00.19	Only two finishers	
100 metres hurdles (wind: -2.9 m/s)	Asmaa Baya Araibia (ALG)	14.27	Dhekra Aoun (TUN)	15.01	Iman Al Nakhli (MAR)	15.02
400 metres hurdles	Sarah Al Hashimi (MAR)	1:01.50	Loubna Benhadja (ALG)	1:02.35	Meriem Bousnina (TUN)	1:05.26
2000 metres steeplechase	Marwa Boughanmi (TUN)	6:55.82	Hoda Ahiti (MAR)	6:58.79	Nassima Smail (ALG)	7:29.41
1000 metres medley relay	Algeria (ALG)	2:19.13	Tunisia (TUN)	2:21.58	Morocco (MAR)	2:23.92
5000 metres track walk	Reham Bouzid (TUN)	24:19.55	Karimah Ben Guider (TUN)	25:15.37	Souhila Azzi (ALG)	26:00.31
High jump	Mariam Abdelhameed Abdulelah (IRQ)	1.59 m	Nourhan Al Kush (LIB)	1.59 m	Nour Al Qadi (JOR)	1.54 m
Pole vault	No Participants					
Long jump	Asmaa Baya Araibia (ALG)	5.67 m	Angie Saleh (LIB)	5.35 m	Nour Al Qadi (JOR)	5.30 m
Triple jump	Dhekra Aoun (TUN)	11.76 m	Mariam Bellitefah (TUN)	11.42 m	Hanane Kouri (ALG)	10.71 m
Shot put	Zainab Zeroual (MAR)	13.81 m	Ouidad Yesli (ALG)	13.35 m	Katia Hammoumrahoui (ALG)	12.20 m
Discus throw	Randa Abdennebi (TUN)	36.60 m	Saeedah Al Humaidi (MAR)	35.82 m	Katia Hammoumrahoui (ALG)	35.30 m
Hammer throw	Marwa Qais Marhoun (IRQ)	48.66 m	Zainab Zeroual (MAR)	47.84 m	Zainab Abdelafi (TUN)	47.49 m
Javelin throw	Nour Ben Ameur (TUN)	41.88 m	Nesrin Ladhhab (TUN)	31.25 m	Saeedah Al Humaidi (MAR)	30.83 m
Heptathlon	Ouidad Yesli (ALG)	4260 pts	Wisal Al Doori (TUN)	3992 pts	Hania Abdallah (ALG)	3946 pts

== Medal table ==
* Host nation (Tunisia)

Rank	Nation	Gold	Silver	Bronze	Total
1	Morocco	10	7	9	26
2	Tunisia*	8	13	12	33
3	Algeria	8	8	9	25
4	Saudi Arabia	5	6	2	13
5	Iraq	4	0	1	5
6	Jordan	3	0	2	5
7	Kuwait	1	3	2	6
8	Lebanon	0	2	0	2
9	Oman	0	0	1	1
10	Sudan	0	0	0	0
10	Yemen	0	0	0	0
Totals (11 entries)		39	39	38	116

== Participation ==
- Tunisia
- Algeria
- Iraq
- Jordan
- Saudi Arabia
- Kuwait
- Libya
- Morocco
- Oman
- Sudan
- Yemen
