= 2019 Arab Youth Athletics Championships =

7th Arab Youth Athletics Championships
- Dates: 4–7 July
- Host city: Radès, Tunisia
- Level: Youth
- Events: 40
- Participation: 13 nations

The 2019 Arab Youth Athletics Championships was the seventh edition of the international athletics competition for under-18 athletes from Arab countries. Organised by the Arab Athletic Federation, it took place in Tunisia Radès from 4–7 July. A total of forty events were contested, of which 20 by male and 20 by female athletes.

== Medal summary ==
=== Men ===
Event	Gold		Silver		Bronze	
100 metres	Ali Khaled Mas (KSA)	10.52 CR	Ali Anouar Al-BAlloushi (OMN)	10.69	Mohammed Zakaria Mouhajer (QAT)	10.88
200 metres	Ali Khaled Mas (KSA)	20.72 CR	Anbar Jamaan Al-Zahrani (KSA)	21.02	Ali Anouar Al-BAlloushi (OMN)	21.71
400 metres	Mohamed Ali Gouaned (ALG)	46.98	Hamza Daier (MAR)	48.70	Anbar Jamaan Al-Zahrani (KSA)	48.73
800 metres	Mehdi Al Saffrani (MAR)	1:55.63	Akram Manghour (ALG)	1:57.00	Bader Mohamed Saad (KWT)	1:57.21
1500 metres	Ayoub Taleb (ALG)	3:55.07	Mohamed Bghati (MAR)	3:55.43	Abdallah Mohamed El-Yaari (YEM)	3:56.56
3000 metres	Yassine Al Aaraj (MAR)	8:22.74	Abdesselam Touati (ALG)	8:33.84	Abdelrahmen Daoud (ALG)	8:40.80
110 metres hurdles (wind: -3.6 m/s)	Youssef Badaoui Said (EGY)	14.44	Hamza El Haffas (MAR)	14.81	Mohamed Ben Mansour (ALG)	14.87
400 metres hurdles	Saad Hanii Saad (MAR)	52.49	Ammar Abid Abdelmajid (QAT)	52.72	Mark Antony Ibrahim (LIB)	54.95
2000 metres steeplechase	Karim Belmahdi (ALG)	5:51.00	Fedi Jedidi (TUN)	5:53.30	Kusai Momammedi (TUN)	6:01.90
1000 metres medley relay	Saudi Arabia (KSA)	1:54.54 CR	Morocco (MAR)	1:55.20	Algeria (ALG)	1:55.77
10000 metres track walk	Abdennour Ameur (ALG)	47:47.95	Souheil Abderrahmen Aloui (ALG)	48:23.23	Oussema Aouina (TUN)	49:30.69
High jump	Mohamed Nouh Khalifa (QAT)	2.01 m	Hachem Adnene (KUW)	1.95 m	SAjjad Abdelkhalek Mohammed (IRQ)	1.90 m
Pole vault	Amir Falah Abdelwahed (IRQ)	4.00 m	Mohamed Karfi (ALG)	3.80 m	Said Ali Al-Ali (QAT)	3.40 m
Long jump	Mehdi Khamsi (MAR)	6.75 m	Hamza Awadh Yakout (OMN)	6.67 m	Aman Majid Bachir (QAT)	6.37 m
Triple jump	Abdallah Jalel Kamar (IRQ)	14.85 m	Mahdi Khamsi (MAR)	14.63 m	Khaled Ayed (KUW)	13.86 m
Shot put	Mohamed Oussema Mohamed (EGY)	18.78 m	Hamza Souissi (QAT)	18.32 m	Ahmed Hamdi Mahmoud (EGY)	17.59 m
Discus throw	Mohamed Oussema Ahmed (EGY)	59.90 m	Ahmed Hamdi Mahmoud (EGY)	53.85 m	Mohamed Skander Bahbouh (ALG)	52.80 m
Hammer throw	Mohamed Said Ibrahim (EGY)	65.37 m	Moubin Rached Al-Kanadi (OMN)	64.91 m	Abdallah Tarek Charaf (QAT)	61.92 m
Javelin throw	Mark Antony Ibrahim (LIB)	54.68 m	Abdelaziz Said Al-Bachati (OMN)	47.95 m	Omar Attia (TUN)	46.47 m
Decathlon	Ahmed Mahmoud Taher (EGY)	6040 pts	Ayoub Ben Sabra (ALG)	5753 pts	Mohammed Dalouch (ALG)	5435 pts

=== Women ===
Event	Gold		Silver		Bronze	
100 metres (wind: -1.1 m/s)	Mayssa Mouawadh (LIB)	12.28	Salma AL Hilali (MAR)	12.44	Asma Makrazi (MAR)	12.50
200 metres	Imen Makrazi (MAR)	24.60	Maram Mahmoud Ahmed (EGY)	25.71	Haya Kobrosli (LIB)	25.82
400 metres	Asma Makrazi (MAR)	57.54	Farah Tayyar (LIB)	59.34	Ines Belgecem (TUN)	1:00.38
800 metres	Nahila Rabii (MAR)	2:16.29	Hiba Bakkari (TUN)	2:16.83	Naouara Lemzaoui (ALG)	2:17.66
1500 metres	Meriem Azrour (MAR)	4:34.24	Khouloud Chaabani (TUN)	4:46.42	Only two finishers	
3000 metres	Sirine Kadri (TUN)	10:26.70	Ghania Rzig (ALG)	10:30.20	Ahlem Barkouth (MAR)	10:39.20
100 metres hurdles (wind: -2.9 m/s)	Rahil Hamel (ALG)	14.71	Malak Ahmed Fathi (EGY)	15.36	Hiba Nasr (TUN)	15.71
400 metres hurdles	Asma Makrazi (MAR)	1:05.48	Souheila Nasr (TUN)	1:06.98	Malak Ahmed Fathi (EGY)	1:07.80
2000 metres steeplechase	Rihab Dhahri (TUN)	6:44.02	Soukaina El Hajji (MAR)	6:49.25	Ismahan Makki (ALG)	7:12.95
1000 metres medley relay	Morocco (MAR)	2:14.74	Lebanon (LIB)	2:18.27	Tunisia (TUN)	2:19.62
5000 metres track walk	Milisia Touloum (ALG)	24:22.41	Soumaya Manai (TUN)	24:45.46	Manar Fadoua Abider (ALG)	28:24.85
High jump	Mayssa Mouawadh (LIB)	1.68 m	Nihed Bousbaa (ALG)	1.59 m	Asya Al Hefiyane (MAR)	1.59 m
Pole vault	Chahd Mohammed Hasan (EGY)	2.80 m	Only one finisher			
Long jump	Taysir Haj Said (TUN)	5.31 m	Donia Bamous (MAR)	5.00 m	Alya Bent Faik Mghiria (OMN)	4.94 m
Triple jump	Chaima Ben Naji (ALG)	11.89 m	Dina Gharselli (TUN)	11.52 m	Islam Kthiri (TUN)	10.54 m
Shot put	Dina Amal Farouk (EGY)	13.23 m	Chaima Chouikh (TUN)	12.05 m	Chaima Bouchaal (MAR)	12.03 m
Discus throw	Raouan Walid Mahmoud (EGY)	43.66 m	Chaima Chouikh (TUN)	40.60 m	Chaima Bouchaal (MAR)	39.06 m
Hammer throw	Ikram Fatima Ezzahra Tajine (ALG)	58.10 m	Najlaa Amal Farouk (EGY)	52.64 m	Habiba El Dhif (TUN)	49.94 m
Javelin throw	Chahinez Al Said Wefki (EGY)	44.25 m	Yasmine Bouharb (TUN)	37.53 m	Roula Semah Raafet (EGY)	36.64 m
Heptathlon	Meriem Ismaili (TUN)	3696 pts	Nesrine Bafouk (ALG)	3665 pts	Meriem Hicham Mouhammed (EGY)	3409 pts

== Medal table ==
* Host nation (Tunisia)

Rank	Nation	Gold	Silver	Bronze	Total
1	Morocco	10	8	5	23
2	Egypt	9	4	4	17
3	Algeria	8	8	8	24
4	Tunisia*	4	9	8	21
5	Lebanon	3	2	2	7
6	Saudi Arabia	3	1	1	5
7	Iraq	2	0	1	3
8	Qatar	1	2	4	7
9	Oman	0	4	2	6
10	Kuwait	0	1	2	3
11	Yemen	0	0	1	1
12	Libya	0	0	0	0
12	Somalia	0	0	0	0
Totals (13 entries)		40	39	38	117

== Participation ==
- Tunisia
- Algeria
- Egypt
- Iraq
- Saudi Arabia
- Kuwait
- Libya
- Lebanon
- Morocco
- Oman
- Qatar
- Somalia
- Yemen
