= Arab Youth Athletics Championships =

Biennial international athletics competition

Arab Youth Athletics Championships البطولة العربية للناشئين والناشئات لألعاب القوى
- Status: active
- Genre: sports event
- Date: midyear
- Frequency: biennial
- Inaugurated: 2004
- Organiser: Arab Athletic Association

The Arab Youth Athletics Championships (Arabic: البطولة العربية للناشئين والناشئات لألعاب القوى) is an biennial international athletics competition between youth athletes (under-18) from Arabic countries. It is organised by the Arab Athletic Association.

If was first held in 2004, building upon the long-running senior Arab Athletics Championships (created 1977) and its corresponding Arab Junior Championships (begun in 1984). Initially being held in the same year as the junior championships, it was moved to an odd-year schedule (in-line with the senior event) to allow young athletes space between the two age category events.

== Editions ==
Ed.	Year	City	Country	Dates	Venue	No. of events	No. of nations	No. of athletes			Winning Nation
Ed.	Year	City	Country	Dates	Venue	No. of events	No. of nations	M	W	Total	Winning Nation
1st	2004	Rabat	Morocco	31 July–2 August		39	16				Morocco
2nd	2007	Damascus	Syria	27–29 June		39	15				Egypt
3rd	2009	Aleppo	Syria	22–24 July		38	15				Egypt
4th	2013	Cairo	Egypt	21–23 June		40	18				Tunisia
5th	2015	Radès	Tunisia	7–9 May		40	11				Tunisia
6th	2017	Radès	Tunisia	2–4 November		39	12				Morocco
7th	2019	Radès	Tunisia	4–7 July		40	13				Morocco
8th	2021	Radès	Tunisia	4–7 July	Radès Sports Complex		18			381	Egypt
9th	2023	Salalah	Oman	7–10 September	Sultan Qaboos Complex		18			350	Morocco
10th	2024	Taif	Saudi Arabia	12–15 September	King Fahd Sports City (Taif)	40	18			400	Morocco
11th	2025	Tunis	Tunisia	23–27 August	Rades Athletics Stadium	40	18			400	Morocco
12th	2026	Cairo	Egypt	5–9 September							Egypt

== Statistics ==
=== Wins by country ===
Until 2026

Overall points winners
Country	Winners	Second	Third	Total
Morocco	6	2	0	8
Egypt	4	5	0	9
Tunisia	2	2	1	5
Sudan	0	2	1	3
Algeria	0	1	5	6
Syria	0	0	2	2
Saudi Arabia	0	0	2	2
Iraq	0	0	1	1

== All-time medal table 2004 to 2026 ==
Rank	Nation	Gold	Silver	Bronze	Total
1	Egypt (EGY)	92	74	58	224
2	Morocco (MAR)	84	70	59	213
3	Tunisia (TUN)	73	94	76	243
4	Algeria (ALG)	69	87	94	250
5	Saudi Arabia (KSA)	43	37	43	123
6	Sudan (SUD)	22	12	12	46
7	Qatar (QAT)	20	13	24	57
8	Iraq (IRQ)	17	21	16	54
9	Kuwait (KUW)	15	20	17	52
10	Syria (SYR)	12	19	25	56
11	Jordan (JOR)	8	2	11	21
12	Oman (OMN)	5	11	11	27
13	United Arab Emirates (UAE)	5	7	4	16
14	Bahrain (BHR)	5	3	0	8
15	Lebanon (LIB)	4	8	13	25
16	Libya (LBY)	3	6	6	15
17	Yemen (YEM)	1	5	5	11
18	Djibouti (DJI)	1	1	0	2
19	Palestine (PLE)	0	0	0	0
Totals (19 entries)		479	490	474	1,443

== Championships records ==
Key: Defunct event

=== Men ===
Event	Record	Athlete	Nationality	Date	Championships	Place	Ref.
100 m	10.52	Ali Khaled Mas	Saudi Arabia	July 2019	2019 Championships	Radès, Tunisia	
200 m	20.72	Ali Khaled Mas	Saudi Arabia	July 2019	2019 Championships	Radès, Tunisia	
400 m	46.34	Awad El Karim Makki	Sudan	July 2009	2009 Championships	Aleppo, Syria	
800 m	1:49.93	Abdalaati Iguider	Morocco	August 2004	2004 Championships	Rabat, Morocco	
1500 m	3:44.90	Mohamad Al-Garni	Qatar	July 2009	2009 Championships	Aleppo, Syria	
3000 m	8:12.16	Mohamed Boufelloussen	Morocco	August 2004	2004 Championships	Rabat, Morocco	
110 m hurdles (91.4 cm)	13.40 (+0.3 m/s)	Zahreddine Gasmi	Algeria	13 September 2024	2024 Championships	Taif, Saudi Arabia	
400 m hurdles	51.53	Mohammed Razgallah Daak	Saudi Arabia	August 2004	2004 Championships	Rabat, Morocco	
2000 m steeplechase	5:40.94	Saïd El Medouli	Morocco	August 2004	2004 Championships	Rabat, Morocco	
High jump	2.14 m	Khalid Said Ameur Alssairi	Qatar	July 2009	2009 Championships	Aleppo, Syria	
Pole vault	4.71 m	Doij Am Okbi	Saudi Arabia	June 2007	2007 Championships	Damascus, Syria	
Long jump	7.36 (+1.8 m/s)	Walid Ghattas	Algeria	12 September 2024	2024 Championships	Taif, Saudi Arabia	
Triple jump	15.23 m	Hussein Abdallah Al Khalef	Saudi Arabia	July 2009	2009 Championships	Aleppo, Syria	
Shot put	21.22 m	Mohamed Magdi Hamza	Egypt	June 2013	2013 Championships	Cairo, Egypt	
Discus throw	64.31 m	Hamid Mansour	Syria	July 2009	2009 Championships	Aleppo, Syria	
Hammer throw	73.84 m	Ahmed Al Sifi Amjed	Qatar	June 2013	2013 Championships	Cairo, Egypt	
Javelin throw	69.95 m	Mohamed Mohamed Ibrahim Qaida	Qatar	July 2009	2009 Championships	Aleppo, Syria	
Decathlon	7216 pts (Note: doubtful, wikipedia event page sourced 6040 pts)	Ahmed Mahmoud Taher	Egypt	July 2019	2019 Championships	Radès, Tunisia	
10,000 m walk (track)	45:51.90	Jebril Rahma Khan	Qatar	June 2007	2007 Championships	Damascus, Syria	
1000 metres medley relay	1:52.97		Saudi Arabia	September 2024	2024 Championships	Taif, Saudi Arabia	

=== Women ===
Event	Record	Athlete	Nationality	Date	Championships	Place	Ref.
100 m	11.66	Bashira Nasser	Bahrain	May 2016	2016 Championships	Tlemcen, Algeria	
200 m	23.21	Edwilge Ova Naim	Bahrain	May 2016	2016 Championships	Tlemcen, Algeria	
400 m	54.21	Muna Jabir Adam	Sudan	2004	2004 Championships	Damascus, Syria	
800 m	2:08.51	Alawia Maki	Sudan	May 2010	2010 Championships	Cairo, Egypt	
1500 m	4:16.24	Dalila Abdelkader	Bahrain	May 2016	2016 Championships	Tlemcen, Algeria	
3000 m	9:14.07	Tejitu Daba	Bahrain	May 2010	2010 Championships	Cairo, Egypt	
5000 m	16:36.69	Karima Saleh Jassem	Bahrain	May 2016	2016 Championships	Tlemcen, Algeria	
10,000 m	37:46.76	Fatiha Killech	Morocco	1994	1994 Championships	Tunis, Tunisia	
100 m hurdles	14.02	Nour Nadi	Morocco	20 April 2018	2018 Championships	Amman, Jordan	
400 m hurdles	58.25	Aminat Yusuf Jamal	Bahrain	May 2016	2016 Championships	Tlemcen, Algeria	
3000 m steeplechase	9:55.38	Ruth Jebet	Bahrain	April 2014	2014 Championships	Cairo, Egypt	
High jump	1.76 m	Basant Musaad Mohammad	Egypt	May 2010	2010 Championships	Cairo, Egypt	
Pole vault	3.60 m	Nour Slimane	Egypt	April 2018	2018 Championships	Amman, Jordan	
Long jump	6.00 m	Rima Ferid Mohamed Taha	Jordan	1 November 2006	2006 Championships	Cairo, Egypt	
Triple jump	13.84 m	Baya Rahouli	Algeria	1996	1996 Championships	Latakia, Syria	
Shot put	15.32 m	Yomna Mohammed Ahmed	Egypt	September 2024	2024 Championships	Taif, Saudi Arabia	
Discus throw	51.58 m	Ritaj Salem Essayah	Libya	May 2016	2016 Championships	Tlemcen, Algeria	
Hammer throw	59.46 m	Esraa Mohamed Mustfa	Egypt	April 2014	2014 Championships	Cairo, Egypt	
Javelin throw	48.54 m	Shirine Chaabene	Egypt	20 April 2018	2018 Championships	Amman, Jordan	
Heptathlon	4742 pts	Noura Nadi	Morocco	April 2018	2018 Championships	Amman, Jordan	
Heptathlon	100m H (wind) / High jump / Shot put / 200m (wind) / Long jump (wind) / Javelin / 800m						
5000 m walk (track)	24:33.27	Olfa Hamdi	TUN	June 2008	2008 Championships	Radès, Tunisia	
10 km (road)	47:30.28	Chahinez Al Nasri	TUN	May 2012	2012 Championships	Amman, Jordan	
4 × 100 m relay	46.60		Bahrain	May 2016	2016 Championships	Tlemcen, Algeria	
4 × 400 m relay	3:44.84		Sudan	2004	2004 Championships	Damascus, Syria	
