= 2009 Arab Youth Athletics Championships =

3rd Arab Youth Athletics Championships
- Dates: 22–24 July
- Host city: Aleppo, Syria
- Level: Youth
- Events: 38
- Participation: 15 nations
- Records set: 11 championship records

The 2009 Arab Youth Athletics Championships was the third edition of the international athletics competition for under-18 athletes from Arab countries. Organised by the Arab Athletic Federation, it took place in the Syrian city of Aleppo from 22 to 24 July. A total of thirty-eight events were contested, of which 20 by male and 18 by female athletes. The difference was accounted for by the lack of steeplechase and pole vault events for girls (the latter being dropped from the tournament due to a lack of entries).

As in 2007, Morocco and Bahrain – typically strong in the sport regionally – did not participate. Egypt topped the table for a second time running, winning eight gold medals in its haul of thirteen. Sudan had the next highest number of event winners, with seven. Algeria had the highest overall medal count, at 22 medals (four gold), and were followed by this ranking by the host nation, which took 20 medals (five gold). Tunisia also performed well, with five gold medals and a total of ten. Thirteen of the five nations present at the competition reached medal table.

A total of eleven championship records were broken at the competition. Awad El Karim Makki of Sudan set new records in both the boys' 200 metres and 400 metres events – defending the two titles he had won in 2007. Syria's Hamid Mansour also achieved a title defence and new record, doing so in the boys' discus throw, and managed to create a double by winning the shot put as well. Three girls managed individual doubles: Abir Barkaoui of Tunisia won the 200 m and 400 m, while Egypt's Fadia Saad Ibrahim and Rana Ahmed Taha swept the throws, taking the shot put/discus and javelin throw/hammer throw, respectively.

Makki of Sudan went on to win a medal at the 2009 World Youth Championships in Athletics, being the only 2009 Arab medallist to do so. Qatar's Mohammed Al-Garni later reached the 1500 m podium at the 2010 World Junior Championships in Athletics. Egyptians Rana Ahmed Taha and Wedian Moktar Abdelhamid claimed senior titles at the 2011 Arab Athletics Championships while their compatriot Fadia Saad Ibrahim became a senior Arab gold medallist in 2013.

== Medal summary ==
=== Men ===
Event	Gold		Silver		Bronze	
100 metres	Mahmoud Hafedh Ibrahim (KSA)	11.00	Hassanine Hussein (IRQ)	11.02	Eid Abdallah Alkawari (QAT)	11.03
200 metres	Awad El Karim Makki (SUD)	21.31 CR	Mohamed Hassen (IRQ)	21.47	Mahmoud Hafedh Ibrahim (KSA)	22.18
400 metres	Awad El Karim Makki (SUD)	46.34 CR	Mohamed Hassen (IRQ)	47.68	Abderraouf Chetoui (ALG)	48.18
800 metres	Nadhir Abdelkader (SUD)	1:56.38	Abdelaziz Mordek (JOR)	1:56.81	Mohamed Amine Al Ayachi (ALG)	1:56.94
1500 metres	Mohamad Al-Garni (QAT)	3:44.90 CR	Walid Saleh Alaya (YEM)	3:52.88	Habib Kadid (ALG)	3:55.78
3000 metres	Abdelmonaam Yahia (SUD)	8:20.84	Nabil Mohamed Al Jerbi (YEM)	8:22.43	Ibrahim Issa (KSA)	8:22.44
110 metres hurdles	Rami Said Mohamed (EGY)	14.09	Fahd Jomaane Al Azemi (KUW)	14.32	Ryadh Selloum (ALG)	14.40
400 metres hurdles	Ali Ayadh Al Refay (KSA)	52.44 CR	Abdelmalek Lahoulou (ALG)	53.08	Ahmed Al Tahar (SUD)	53.55
2000 metres steeplechase	Taha Grida (TUN)	6:01.43	Fawzi Bourouih (ALG)	6:03.45	Ahmed Mohamed Borhan (KSA)	6:05.15
1000 metres medley relay	Iraq (IRQ)	1:55.09	Algeria (ALG); Karim Zerroug; Sid Ahmed Fliti; Sofiane Amour; Abderraouf Chetoui	1:56.07	Sudan (SUD)	1:56.63
10,000 m walk	Hazem Al Ahmed (SYR)	48:02.0	Ferhat Belaid (ALG)	48:19.6	Mohamed Bacca (SYR)	48:21.7
High jump	Khalid Said Ameur Alssairi (QAT)	2.14 m CR	Faraj Salem Saleh (KUW)	2.06 m	Ali Maachi (KSA)	1.95 m
Pole vault	Mohamed Mala Khalef (SYR)	4.50 m	Hamza Harbaoui (TUN)	4.45 m	Ahmed Issam Al Kandri (KUW)	4.40 m
Long jump	Faraj Salem Saleh (KUW)	6.80 m	Hamza Issa (SYR)	6.49 m	Ahmed Abdelwahab Abderradhi (KUW)	6.49 m
Triple jump	Hussein Abdallah Al Khalef (KSA)	15.23 m CR	Fayçal Meddourene (ALG)	14.72 m	Ali Maachi (KSA)	14.56 m
Shot put	Hamid Mansour (SYR)	17.36 m	Abderrahman Adel (IRQ)	16.93 m	Ahmed Badr Abbes (KUW)	16.18 m
Discus throw	Hamid Mansour (SYR)	64.31 m CR	Issa Mohamed Al Zankaoui (KUW)	56.69 m	Omar Issa Chamia (QAT)	53.34 m
Hammer throw	Hussein Ahmed Mohamed Murad (KUW)	61.99 m	Abderrahman Thafi Shahrani (QAT)	59.26 m	Saleh Astaief (SYR)	57.46 m
Javelin throw	Mohamed Mohamed Ibrahim Qaida (QAT)	69.95 m CR	Karar Raad Mohi (IRQ)	60.82 m	Mekarem Mouhamid (SYR)	59.78 m
Octathlon	Fayçal Meddourene (ALG)	5418 pts	Ryadh Selloum (ALG)	5318 pts	Youssef Mohamed Bilel (KUW)	5239 pts

=== Women ===
Event	Gold		Silver		Bronze	
100 metres	Celia Adouane (ALG)	12.51	Asma Oussama Youssef (EGY)	12.57	Kheira Bourahla (ALG)	12.61
200 metres	Abir Barkaoui (TUN)	25.05	Ahlem Mebarki (ALG)	25.16	Asma Oussama Youssef (EGY)	25.48
400 metres	Abir Barkaoui (TUN)	55.78	Afrae Mahmoud (SYR)	61.66	Laura Saliyan (LIB)	62.77
800 metres	Aloiuia Makki (SUD)	2:12.61	Hallouma Jerfal (TUN)	2:17.05	Chama Adjali (ALG)	2:18.00
1500 metres	Mbarka Chihaoui (TUN)	4:45.7	Hadda Souaidia (ALG)	4:51.16	Sarra Aouali (LIB)	5:00.73
3000 metres	Najoua Al Baker (SYR)	11:11.0	Ghada Abdessalem (SYR)	11:25.0	Balkis Ahmed Charaf (YEM)	11:35.0
100 metres hurdles	Hadjira Achour (ALG)	14.66	Selma Abdelhamid (TUN)	14.80	Wedian Moktar Abdelhamid (EGY)	14.92
400 metres hurdles	Tessabih Mohamed Essid (SUD)	63.75	Fatma Abdallah Suleiman (YEM)	64.70	Selma Abdelhamid (TUN)	65.54
1000 metres medley relay	Sudan (SUD); Aloiuia Makki; Tessabih Mohamed Essid; Aicha Edam; Emna Abaker	2:14.37	Algeria (ALG); Chama Adjali; Celia Adouane; Kheira Bourahla; Ahlem Mebarki	2:17.49	Egypt (EGY)	2:19.69
5000 m walk	Dahbia Moussaou (ALG)	28:28.93	Sellama Al Sghir (SYR)	28:46.37	Nermine Hourou (SYR)	34:23.76
High jump	Bassanet Saad Mohamed (EGY)	1.60 m CR	Nour Assous (SYR)	1.55 m	Sarra Tabara (LIB)	1.45 m
Long jump	Souheila Helmi Mostafa (EGY)	5.54 m	Marah Della (SYR)	5.50 m	Rima Alan Thomas (QAT)	5.07 m
Triple jump	Rabaa Rezgui (TUN)	12.08 m	Souheila Helmi Mostafa (EGY)	11.97 m	Marah Della (SYR)	11.52 m
Shot put	Fadia Saad Ibrahim (EGY)	12.97 m	Malak Mohamed Al Soury (LBA)	9.05 m	Lisa Saleh (SYR)	8.68 m
Discus throw	Fadia Saad Ibrahim (EGY)	36.11 m	Malak Mohamed Al Soury (LBA)	32.57 m	Hanane Zid (SYR)	29.46 m
Hammer throw	Rana Ahmed Taha (EGY)	54.31 m CR	Nabiha Gueddah (TUN)	44.35 m	Zahra Tatar (ALG)	43.02 m
Javelin throw	Rana Ahmed Taha (EGY)	33.61 m	Sabrina Djabril (ALG)	30.25 m	Ghadir Maadka (SYR)	26.74 m
Heptathlon	Wedian Moktar Abdelhamid (EGY)	4277 pts CR	Ahlem Mebarki (ALG)	3988 pts	Nour Assous (SYR)	3909 pts

== Medal table ==
* Host nation (Syria)

Rank	Nation	Gold	Silver	Bronze	Total
1	Egypt	8	2	3	13
2	Sudan	7	0	2	9
3	Syria*	5	6	9	20
4	Tunisia	5	4	1	10
5	Algeria	4	11	7	22
6	Qatar	3	1	3	7
7	Saudi Arabia	3	0	5	8
8	Kuwait	2	3	4	9
9	Iraq	1	5	0	6
10	Yemen	0	3	1	4
11	Libya	0	2	0	2
12	Jordan	0	1	0	1
13	Lebanon	0	0	3	3
Totals (13 entries)		38	38	38	114

- NB: The Tunisian athletics federation's medal counts excluded the medals for the women's 400 m hurdles and the women's javelin. The above tally includes these.

== Participation ==
- Algeria
- Egypt
- Iraq
- Jordan
- Kuwait
- Lebanon
- Libya
- Oman
- Qatar
- Saudi Arabia
- Sudan
- Syria
- Tunisia
- United Arab Emirates
- Yemen
