= 2004 Arab Youth Athletics Championships =

1st Arab Youth Athletics Championships
- Dates: 31 July–2 August
- Host city: Rabat, Morocco
- Level: Youth
- Events: 39

The 2004 Arab Youth Athletics Championships was the inaugural edition of the international athletics competition for under-18 athletes from Arab countries. Organised by the Arab Athletic Federation, it took place in Rabat, Morocco from 31 July to 2 August. A total of thirty-nine events were contested, of which 20 by male and 19 by female athletes, identically matching the programme of the 2003 World Youth Championships in Athletics. The girls' programme did not have a steeplechase event.

Five athletes completed individual doubles at the tournament. On the boys' side, Omani Abdullah Al-Sooli won a 100 metres/200 metres short sprint double and Abdalaati Iguider of Morocco took both middle-distance titles. On the girls' side, Nawal El Jack of Sudan won both the 400 metres flat and 400 metres hurdles, Jordan's Rima Taha won both horizontal jumps, and Egypt's Sara Es Sayed Hassib Dardiri won the shot put and discus throw.

The host nation Morocco easily topped the table with a total of fourteen golds among its 42 medals. The Next most successful nations were Egypt, with six gold medals, and Sudan, with five gold medals from its haul of 17. Saudi Arabia and Algeria were the other stand-out nations, having each won thirteen medals. A total of twelve nations reached the medal table.

The competition was held in the same year as the 2004 Arab Junior Athletics Championships. The youth event subsequently became a biennial event held in odd-numbered years, in order to avoid the schedule clash. Three champions from the youth championships also won an Arab junior title that year, all from the throw events: Mostafa Abdul El-Moaty won the shot put titles, Yasser Mohamed Ali Hassan had a javelin throw double, and Iman Mohamed El Ashri was twice hammer throw winner. Four of the medallists here went on to win individual medals at the 2005 World Youth Championships in Athletics: Adam El-Nour turned his Arab youth 400 m to a world gold, Nawal El Jack won the girls' 400 m world title, while Arab boy's 400 m hurdles medallists Abdulagadir Idriss and Mohammed Daak were first and second at the global event.

== Medal summary ==
=== Men ===
Event	Gold		Silver		Bronze	
100 metres	Abdullah Al-Sooli (OMN)	11.07	Ahmed Nasser Al-Ouahbi (OMN)	11.10	Mohammed Ali Al-Bishi (KSA)	11.12
200 metres	Abdullah Al-Sooli (OMN)	22.00	Ahmed Nasser Al-Ouahbi (OMN)	22.05	Mohamed Achour Khouaja (LBA)	22.18
400 metres	Adam El-Nour (SUD)	48.13	Mohammed Salem Al-Rawahi (OMN)	48.90	Bandar Yahya Sharahili (KSA)	49.30
800 metres	Abdalaati Iguider (MAR)	1:49.93	William Philip Koudi (SUD)	1:51.07	Adam El-Nour (SUD)	1:51.57
1500 metres	Abdalaati Iguider (MAR)	3:49.14	Adil Beriami (MAR)	3:54.22	Nayel Slimane Attia (SUD)	3:55.09
3000 metres	Mohamed Boufelloussen (MAR)	8:12.16	Nayel Slimane Attia (SUD)	8:14.11	Ali Al-Amri (KSA)	8:14.86
110 metres hurdles	Mustafa Habib Al-Ajami (KSA)	14.24	Taha El Madani (MAR)	14.42	Gharib Al-Khaldi (OMN)	14.56
400 metres hurdles	Mohammed Razgallah Daak (KSA)	51.53	Bandar Yahya Sharahili (KSA)	51.91	Abdulagadir Idriss (SUD)	52.98
2000 metres steeplechase	Saïd El Medouli (MAR)	5:40.94	Ali Al-Amri (KSA)	5:49.68	Mohammed Attia Jabrane (KSA)	6:00.14
1000 metres medley relay	Saudi Arabia (KSA)	1:54.74	Sudan (SUD)	1:55.51	Oman (OMN)	1:56.32
10,000 m track walk	Omar El Hak Bardad (ALG)	48:35.77	Amine Jarfaoui (ALG)	49:23.43	El Houcine Boumahdi (MAR)	51:01.67
High jump	Abderrazak Jaadoun (ALG)	2.01 m	Mohammed Ahmed Hussain (KUW)	1.98 m	Faisal Ghazi Al-Sana (KUW)	1.98 m
Pole vault	Rabie El Hassani (MAR)	4.20 m	Ahmed El Jami (TUN)	4.00 m	Lyeth Moufid Felah Al-Moumni (JOR)	3.80 m
Long jump	Abdelnabi Amoudder (MAR)	7.27 m	Mohamed Yassine Chaieb (TUN)	7.08 m	Mubarak Jasser Al-Jassem (KSA)	7.01 m
Triple jump	Marzouk Zaki Mubarak (KUW)	15.15 m	Abdelnabi Amoudder (MAR)	14.95 m	Malek Abbes Al-Salem (KSA)	14.69 m
Shot put	Mostafa Abdul El-Moaty (EGY)	19.17 m	Meshari Sorour Saad (KUW)	18.52 m	Mohammed Gharrous (MAR)	16.36 m
Discus throw	Mohamed Wadah Mansour (LBA)	56.06 m	Mohammed Omar Mohammed (UAE)	52.33 m	Mourad Zayani (MAR)	50.97 m
Hammer throw	Ahmed Mohamed Abdelghani Suleiman (EGY)	66.58 m	El Hadi Radouan (MAR)	63.70 m	Mohammed Omar Mohammed (UAE)	62.12 m
Javelin throw	Yasser Mohamed Ali Hassan (SUD)	65.11 m	Khamis Ghabash Al-Qutaiti (OMN)	64.55 m	Fakhreddine Chatti (TUN)	61.06 m
Octathlon	Mohammed Jassem Al-Qaree (KSA)	5700 pts	Saeed Fahd Al-Bishi (KSA)	5333 pts	Taha El Madani (MAR)	5215 pts

=== Women ===
Event	Gold		Silver		Bronze	
100 metres	Fadoua Adli (MAR)	12.67	Hajar Aït Assou (MAR)	13.11	Amina Ahmed Attia (SUD)	13.27
200 metres	Siham Noussaïl (MAR)	25.16	Fadoua Adli (MAR)	26.34	Firyal Ourari (ALG)	29.02
400 metres	Nawal El Jack (SUD)	55.30	Siham Noussaïl (MAR)	56.29	Halima Hachlaf (MAR)	56.74
800 metres	Halima Hachlaf (MAR)	2:08.84	Malika Akkaoui (MAR)	2:10.31	Iman Al-Jallad (SYR)	2:10.80
1500 metres	Iman Al-Jallad (SYR)	4:26.70	Machair Ali Najit (SUD)	4:27.26	Rkia Moukim (MAR)	4:28.58
3000 metres	Machair Ali Najit (SUD)	9:38.24	Amal Dhafir (MAR)	9:38.90	Durka Mana (SUD)	9:39.15
100 metres hurdles	Amal Chaouch Tayara (ALG)	15.12	Firyal Ourari (ALG)	15.41	Méryem Ouahbi (MAR)	15.73
400 metres hurdles	Nawal El Jack (SUD)	62.07	Rajae El Serghini (MAR)	63.59	Kamar Aït Bella (MAR)	65.36
1000 metres medley relay	Morocco (MAR)	2:20.26	Sudan (SUD)	2:21.59	Algeria (ALG)	2:22.86
5000 m track walk	Nashwa Ibrahim Fathi Ibrahim (EGY)	26:28.37	Ibtissam Belabbasi (ALG)	28:58.78	Yasmine El Mokh (MAR)	31:56.20
High jump	Méryem Ouahbi (MAR)	1.55 m	Rajae Mamane (MAR)	1.50 m	Duka Mana (SUD)	1.30 m
Pole vault	Nisrine Dinar (MAR)	3.70 m	Basma Sayah (TUN)	3.50 m	Kouhaïna Aliouch Adli (ALG)	2.60 m
Long jump	Rima Taha (JOR)	5.72 m	Hajar Majjout (MAR)	5.39 m	Imane El Moutarajji (MAR)	4.94 m
Triple jump	Rima Taha (JOR)	11.90 m	Amina Ahmed Attia (SUD)	11.62 m	Imane El Moutarajji (MAR)	11.56 m
Shot put	Sara Es Sayed Hassib Dardiri (EGY)	11.59 m	Dalila Mezai (ALG)	10.93 m	Ibtissam El Makhfi (MAR)	10.81 m
Discus throw	Sara Es Sayed Hassib Dardiri (EGY)	42.00 m	Kouhaïna Aliouch Adli (ALG)	34.85 m	Farida Dallama (MAR)	31.02 m
Hammer throw	Iman Mohamed El Ashri (EGY)	52.48 m	Yasmin Ashraf Abdeslam (EGY)	50.35 m	Ibtissam El Makhfi (MAR)	42.50 m
Javelin throw	Fatiha Jarmouni (MAR)	34.58 m	Noura Sellami (MAR)	29.28 m	Kouhaïna Aliouch Adli (ALG)	11.19 m
Heptathlon	Sanaa Majid (MAR)	3265 pts	Rajae El Serghini (MAR)	3051 pts	Samira Chouri (ALG)	1149 pts

== Medal table ==
* Host nation (Morocco)

Rank	Nation	Gold	Silver	Bronze	Total
1	Morocco*	14	14	14	42
2	Egypt	6	1	0	7
3	Sudan	5	6	6	17
4	Saudi Arabia	4	3	6	13
5	Algeria	3	5	5	13
6	Oman	2	4	2	8
7	Jordan	2	0	1	3
8	Kuwait	1	2	1	4
9	Libya	1	0	1	2
9	Syria	1	0	1	2
11	Tunisia	0	3	1	4
12	United Arab Emirates	0	1	1	2
Totals (12 entries)		39	39	39	117
