= 2013 World Youth Championships in Athletics – Boys' 400 metres =

Boys' 400 metres at the 2013 World Youth Championships in Athletics
- Venue: RSC Olimpiyskiy
- Dates: 10 July (heats); 11 July (semifinal); 12 July (final)
- Competitors: 61
- Winning time: 45.89 WYL

Medalists
| gold medal | Martin Manley | Jamaica |
| silver medal | Ryan Clark | United States |
| bronze medal | Alex Sampao | Kenya |

The boys' 400 metres at the 2013 World Youth Championships in Athletics was held from 10 to 12 July.

== Medalists ==
| Gold | Silver | Bronze |
|---|---|---|
| Martin Manley; Jamaica | Ryan Clark; United States | Alex Sampao; Kenya |

== Records ==
Prior to the competition, the following records were as follows.

| World Youth Best | Obea Moore (USA) | 45.14 | Santiago de Chile, Chile | 2 September 1995 |
| Championship Record | Kirani James (GRN) | 45.24 | Brixen, Italy | 10 July 2009 |
| World Youth Leading | Devaughn Baker (JAM) | 46.64 | Kingston, Jamaica | 16 March 2013 |
| World Youth Leading | Chris Platt (USA) | 46.64 | Austin, TX, United States | 10 May 2013 |

== Heats ==
Qualification rule: first 2 of each heat (Q) plus the 8 fastest times (q) qualified.

=== Heat 1 ===
| Rank | Lane | Name | Nationality | Time | Notes |
|---|---|---|---|---|---|
| 1 | 6 | Batuhan Altıntaş | Turkey | 47.50 | Q |
| 2 | 5 | Haji Turie | Ethiopia | 47.83 | Q, PB |
| 3 | 3 | Dimitrios Vlahas | Greece | 47.92 | q, PB |
| 4 | 2 | Alex Sampao | Kenya | 47.94 | q |
| 5 | 8 | Khalifa Bakhit Bin Jarn | United Arab Emirates | 48.95 | PB |
| 6 | 7 | Zubin Percy Muncherji | Singapore | 49.20 | |
| 7 | 1 | Nicolae Gorcea | Romania | 49.21 | |
| | 4 | Jaturong Chimrueang | Thailand | DNS | |

=== Heat 2 ===
| Rank | Lane | Name | Nationality | Time | Notes |
|---|---|---|---|---|---|
| 1 | 1 | Omeiza John Akerele | Nigeria | 48.29 | Q |
| 2 | 2 | Giuseppe Leonardi | Italy | 48.44 | Q |
| 3 | 7 | Eckhardt Roussouw | South Africa | 49.16 | |
| 4 | 6 | Luis Arizala | Colombia | 49.31 | |
| 5 | 3 | Kyron McMaster | British Virgin Islands | 49.52 | |
| 6 | 4 | Darwin Echeverry | Spain | 49.54 | |
| 7 | 8 | Mykhaylo Tyutyunnykov | Ukraine | 49.68 | PB |
| | 5 | Tatenda Matesanwa | Zimbabwe | DNS | |

=== Heat 3 ===
| Rank | Lane | Name | Nationality | Time | Notes |
|---|---|---|---|---|---|
| 1 | 7 | Ian Mutuku | Kenya | 46.85 | Q, PB |
| 2 | 3 | Samuel Baird | Australia | 46.97 | Q, PB |
| 3 | 8 | Kakeru Yamaki | Japan | 46.99 | q, PB |
| 4 | 6 | Warren Hazel | Saint Kitts and Nevis | 47.23 | q, PB |
| 5 | 1 | Constantin Schmidt | Germany | 48.28 | q |
| 6 | 5 | Edwin Diodonet | Puerto Rico | 49.10 | |
| 7 | 2 | Berk Köksal | Turkey | 49.28 | PB |
| 8 | 4 | Christian Sand Clausen | Denmark | 49.93 | |

=== Heat 4 ===
| Rank | Lane | Name | Nationality | Time | Notes |
|---|---|---|---|---|---|
| 1 | 3 | Kaisei Yui | Japan | 47.28 | Q |
| 2 | 8 | Laurin Walter | Germany | 47.74 | Q, PB |
| 3 | 7 | Jordan Jimerson | United States | 48.28 | q |
| 4 | 6 | Mykhaylo Yavorskyy | Ukraine | 48.67 | |
| 5 | 5 | Kevin Emanuel Lecitra | Argentina | 48.84 | PB |
| 6 | 4 | Vincent Karger | Luxembourg | 48.91 | PB |
| 7 | 2 | Euddy Roberti | Venezuela | 49.63 | |

=== Heat 5 ===
| Rank | Lane | Name | Nationality | Time | Notes |
|---|---|---|---|---|---|
| 1 | 3 | Ryan Clark | United States | 46.84 | Q, PB |
| 2 | 5 | Mazen Al-Yassin | Saudi Arabia | 48.30 | Q |
| 3 | 7 | Emanuele Grossi | Italy | 48.55 | PB |
| 4 | 8 | Szabolcs Vígvári | Hungary | 49.15 | |
| 5 | 2 | Jakob Brull | Canada | 49.29 | |
| 6 | 6 | Kinard Rolle | Bahamas | 49.51 | |
| 7 | 4 | Cristian Taut | Romania | 50.40 | |

=== Heat 6 ===
| Rank | Lane | Name | Nationality | Time | Notes |
|---|---|---|---|---|---|
| 1 | 3 | Martin Manley | Jamaica | 47.08 | Q |
| 2 | 8 | Abbas Abubaker | Bahrain | 47.28 | Q, PB |
| 3 | 7 | Samson Oghenewegba Nathaniel | Nigeria | 47.90 | q |
| 4 | 6 | Wandifa Sanneh | Gambia | 48.80 | PB |
| 5 | 5 | Mateo Kovacic | Croatia | 49.20 | |
| 6 | 1 | Ricardo Feliciano | Puerto Rico | 49.83 | |
| 7 | 4 | Jeffri Arcia | Nicaragua | 50.16 | |
| | 2 | Batinisavu Uluiyata | Fiji | DQ | |

=== Heat 7 ===
| Rank | Lane | Name | Nationality | Time | Notes |
|---|---|---|---|---|---|
| 1 | 2 | Janeko Cartwright | Bahamas | 47.25 | Q, PB |
| 2 | 1 | Mohamed Nasir Abbas | Qatar | 47.45 | Q, PB |
| 3 | 7 | Erik Martinsson | Sweden | 47.70 | q, PB |
| 4 | 4 | Miguel Ángel Ortega | Panama | 48.59 | PB |
| 5 | 6 | Kelvis Padrino | Venezuela | 48.70 | PB |
| 6 | 3 | Dmitriy Karaulov | Kazakhstan | 49.89 | |
| 7 | 8 | Saula Nodrakoro | Fiji | 50.90 | |
| | 5 | Tijan Keita | Gambia | DQ | |

=== Heat 8 ===
| Rank | Lane | Name | Nationality | Time | Notes |
|---|---|---|---|---|---|
| 1 | 5 | Devaughn Baker | Jamaica | 47.58 | Q |
| 2 | 6 | Jason Yaw | Guyana | 48.38 | Q |
| 3 | 8 | Jaka Zupan | Slovenia | 48.55 | PB |
| 4 | 2 | Wang Wei-Hsu | Chinese Taipei | 49.06 | |
| 5 | 3 | Muhamad Azam Masri | Malaysia | 49.33 | |
| 6 | 4 | Alexander Szuba | Canada | 49.72 | |
| 7 | 7 | Akhenaton Pierre | Saint Lucia | 49.92 | |

== Semifinals ==
Qualification rule: first 2 of each heat (Q) plus the 2 fastest times (q) qualified.

=== Heat 1 ===
| Rank | Lane | Name | Nationality | Time | Notes |
|---|---|---|---|---|---|
| 1 | 4 | Ryan Clark | United States | 46.33 | Q, WYL |
| 2 | 5 | Batuhan Altıntaş | Turkey | 46.72 | Q, PB |
| 3 | 3 | Devaughn Baker | Jamaica | 46.78 | q |
| 4 | 2 | Alex Sampao | Kenya | 46.83 | q, PB |
| 5 | 8 | Kakeru Yamaki | Japan | 47.38 | |
| 6 | 6 | Laurin Walter | Germany | 47.69 | PB |
| 7 | 7 | Haji Turie | Ethiopia | 48.12 | |
| 8 | 1 | Erik Martinsson | Sweden | 48.90 | |

=== Heat 2 ===
| Rank | Lane | Name | Nationality | Time | Notes |
|---|---|---|---|---|---|
| 1 | 5 | Martin Manley | Jamaica | 46.65 | Q, PB |
| 2 | 4 | Abbas Abubaker | Bahrain | 46.85 | Q, PB |
| 3 | 3 | Janeko Cartwright | Bahamas | 47.23 | PB |
| 4 | 6 | Samuel Baird | Australia | 47.48 | |
| 5 | 2 | Constantin Schmidt | Germany | 48.05 | PB |
| 6 | 7 | Giuseppe Leonardi | Italy | 48.10 | PB |
| 7 | 1 | Samson Oghenewegba Nathaniel | Nigeria | 48.14 | |
| 8 | 8 | Jason Yaw | Guyana | 50.39 | |

=== Heat 3 ===
| Rank | Lane | Name | Nationality | Time | Notes |
|---|---|---|---|---|---|
| 1 | 6 | Mohamed Nasir Abbas | Qatar | 46.78 | Q, PB |
| 2 | 4 | Ian Mutuku | Kenya | 46.87 | Q |
| 3 | 8 | Mazen Al-Yassin | Saudi Arabia | 46.99 | PB |
| 4 | 7 | Warren Hazel | Saint Kitts and Nevis | 47.07 | PB |
| 5 | 5 | Kaisei Yui | Japan | 47.23 | |
| 6 | 3 | Omeiza John Akerele | Nigeria | 47.23 | PB |
| 7 | 1 | Jordan Jimerson | United States | 47.97 | |
| 8 | 2 | Dimitrios Vlahas | Greece | 48.33 | |

== Final ==
| Rank | Lane | Name | Nationality | Time | Notes |
|---|---|---|---|---|---|
| 1st place, gold medalist(s) | 6 | Martin Manley | Jamaica | 45.89 | WYL |
| 2nd place, silver medalist(s) | 5 | Ryan Clark | United States | 46.46 | |
| 3rd place, bronze medalist(s) | 2 | Alex Sampao | Kenya | 46.78 | PB |
| 4 | 7 | Ian Mutuku | Kenya | 47.02 | |
| 5 | 3 | Batuhan Altıntaş | Turkey | 47.10 | |
| 6 | 4 | Mohamed Nasir Abbas | Qatar | 47.20 | |
| 7 | 1 | Devaughn Baker | Jamaica | 47.97 | |
| | 8 | Abbas Abubaker | Bahrain | DQ | |
