= 2009 World Youth Championships in Athletics – Boys' 200 metres =

The Boys' 200 metres at the 2009 World Youth Championships in Athletics was held at the Brixen-Bressanone Sport Arena on 10, 11, and 12 July. The event was won by Kirani James of Grenada, who also won the 400 metres.

== Medalists ==
Gold	Silver	Bronze
Kirani James; Grenada	Alberto Gavaldá; Spain	Keenan Brock; United States

== Records ==
Prior to the competition, the following records were as follows.

World Youth Best	Usain Bolt (JAM)	20.13	Bridgetown, Barbados	20 July 2003
Championship Record	Usain Bolt (JAM)	20.40	Sherbrooke, Canada	13 July 2003
World Youth Leading	Dedric Dukes (USA)	20.94	Altamonte Springs, USA	20 June 2009

No new records were set during the competition.

== Heats ==
Qualification rule: first 2 of each heat (Q) plus the 4 fastest times (q) qualified.

== Semifinals ==
Qualification rule: first 2 of each heat (Q) plus the 2 fastest times (q) qualified.

=== Heat 1 ===
Rank	Lane	Name	Nationality	Time	Notes
1	3	Keenan Brock	United States	21.36	Q, PB
2	1	Tomasz Kluczynski	Poland	21.43	Q, PB
3	4	Sam Watts	Great Britain	21.50	q, PB
4	6	Johannes de Klerk	South Africa	21.52	q
5	8	Kazunori Katsuyama	Japan	21.69	
6	2	Marlon Laidlaw-Allen	Canada	21.93	
7	7	Carlos Rodríguez	Puerto Rico	22.01	
8	5	Comfort Olugbemi	Nigeria	22.13	

Key: PB = Personal best, SB = Seasonal best

Wind: 0.6 m/s

=== Heat 2 ===
Rank	Lane	Name	Nationality	Time	Notes
1	5	Dedric Dukes	United States	21.22	Q
2	3	Leandro De Araújo	Brazil	21.76	Q
3	2	Demetri Knowles	Bahamas	21.76	
4	6	Tan Juquan	China	21.78	
5	8	Masato Hayashi	Japan	21.79	
6	1	José Antonio Vizuete	Spain	22.08	
7	4	Adam Pawlowski	Poland	22.41	
8	7	Yateya Kambepera	Botswana	22.45	

Key: PB = Personal best, SB = Seasonal best

Wind: 0.9 m/s

=== Heat 3 ===
Rank	Lane	Name	Nationality	Time	Notes
1	5	Kirani James	Grenada	21.23	Q
2	3	Alberto Gavaldá	Spain	21.43	Q, SB
3	4	Moriba Morain	Trinidad and Tobago	21.56	
4	1	Nicholas Deshong	Barbados	21.57	
5	7	Alex Jordan	New Zealand	21.91	PB
6	6	Huang Xiang	China	21.99	
7	2	Lester Ryan	Montserrat	22.01	PB
8	8	Kemar Bailey-Cole	Jamaica	22.11	

Key: PB = Personal best, SB = Seasonal best

Wind: 1.4 m/s

== Final ==
Rank	Lane	Name	Nationality	Time	Notes
1st place, gold medalist(s)	3	Kirani James	Grenada	21.05	PB
2nd place, silver medalist(s)	7	Alberto Gavaldá	Spain	21.33	SB
3rd place, bronze medalist(s)	4	Keenan Brock	United States	21.39	
4	5	Dedric Dukes	United States	21.61	
5	6	Tomasz Kluczynski	Poland	21.70	
6	8	Leandro De Araújo	Brazil	21.78	
7	1	Sam Watts	Great Britain	22.00	
8	2	Johannes de Klerk	South Africa	22.04	

Key: PB = Personal best, SB = Seasonal best

Wind: −0.9 m/s
