= Dedric Dukes =

American sprinter and football player (born 1992)

Personal information
- Nationality: United States
- Born: February 4, 1992 (age 34) Miami, Florida, U.S.
- Height: 5 ft 11 in (1.80 m)
- Weight: 170 lb (77 kg)

Sport
- Sport: Running
- Event: Sprints
- College team: Florida Gators

Achievements and titles
- Personal bests: 100 m: 10.27 (-1.8); 200 m: 19.97 (-0.6); 400 m: 46.38
Medal record
Men's athletics
Representing the United States
World Youth Championships
| Gold medal – first place | 2009 Brixen | Medley relay |

Dedric Dukes (born February 4, 1992) is an American sprinter and former American football wide receiver. He attended the University of Florida.

A native of Miami, Dukes attended Booker T. Washington High School, where he ran track and played on the football varsity, being teammates with Quinton Dunbar, Lynden Trail, Eduardo Clements and Elkino Watson.

Dukes finished fourth in the 200 m at the 2009 World Youth Championships in Athletics, despite entering the event as World Youth Leading. He also helped the US medley relay squad to a gold medal.

Dukes ran 200 m in 19.97 on April 4, 2014, at the Florida Relays, a world leading time at that point. The time placed him eighth on the all-time collegiate list.
