= Alberto Gavaldá =

Spanish sprinter

Personal information
- Full name: Alberto Gavaldá Pina
- Born: 5 November 1992 (age 33) Zaragoza, Spain

Sport
- Sport: Running
- Event: Sprints

Achievements and titles
- Personal best(s): 100 m: 10.44 (Avilés 2009); 200 m: 21.28 (Zaragoza 2009)
Medal record
Men's athletics
Representing Spain
World Youth Championships
| Silver medal – second place | 2009 Brixen | 200 m |

Alberto Gavaldá Pina (born 5 November 1992) is a Spanish sprinter.

He won the silver medal over 200 metres at the 2009 World Youth Championships in Athletics.

== Competition record ==
| Year | Competition | Venue | Position | Event | Notes |
Representing Spain
| 2008 | World Junior Championships | Bydgoszcz, Poland | — | 4 × 100 m relay | DNF |
| 2009 | European Indoor Championships | Turin, Italy | 31st (h) | 60 m | 7.00 |
| 2009 | World Youth Championships | Brixen, Italy | 2nd | 200 m | 21.33 |
| 2009 | European Youth Olympic Festival | Tampere, Finland | 1st | 200 m | 10.77 |
| 2009 | European Youth Olympic Festival | Tampere, Finland | 1st | 4 × 100 m relay | 41.20 |
| 2010 | Ibero-American Championships | San Fernando, Spain | 13th (h) | 200 m | 39.45 |
| 2010 | Ibero-American Championships | San Fernando, Spain | 2nd | 4 × 100 m relay | 39.45 |
| 2010 | World Junior Championships | Moncton, Canada | 33rd (h) | 100 m | 10.75 (+0.8 m/s) |
| 2010 | World Junior Championships | Moncton, Canada | 16th (h) | 4 × 100 m relay | 40.82 |
| 2011 | European Junior Championships | Tallinn, Estonia | 8th | 200 m | 21.76 |
| 2012 | European Championships | Helsinki, Finland | 9th (h) | 4 × 100 m relay | 39.81 |
| 2016 | Ibero-American Championships | Rio de Janeiro, Brazil | 16th (h) | 200 m | 21.53^{1} |
| 2016 | Ibero-American Championships | Rio de Janeiro, Brazil | 4th | 4 × 100 m relay | 39.28 |
| 2016 | European Championships | Amsterdam, Netherlands | 9th (h) | 4 × 100 m relay | 39.15 |
| 2019 | European Games | Minsk, Belarus | 11th | Mixed 4 x 400 m relay | 3:22.99 |
| 2019 | European Games | Minsk, Belarus | TBD | DNA Athletics | TBD |

^{1}Did not start in the semifinals
