= Youth sports in the United States =

According to WinterGreen Research, the size of the United States youth sports market has grown 55 percent since 2010 and is a $15.3 billion market in 2017. In recent years, youth sports have become more expensive in the United States. The financial burden of organized sports has grown, and children from low-income families are less likely to participate. The single greatest predictor of whether a child will start playing organized sports young, is whether their household income exceeds $100,000 per year.

A nationally representative 2024 parent survey by the Aspen Institute, Utah State University, and Louisiana Tech University found that U.S. families spent an average of $1,016 on a child's primary sport, 46 percent more than in 2019. Spending on the same child's additional sports averaged another $475, bringing total annual spending to nearly $1,500.

Injuries have always been of concern in terms of sport but youth are much more susceptible to injury considering both their immature musculoskeletal system and increasingly high intensity training. According to the U.S. Centers for Disease Control and Prevention (CDC), participation in organized sports is on the rise. Nearly 30 million children and adolescents participate in youth sports just in the United States. High school athletes account for an estimated 2 million injuries, 500,000 doctor visits, and 30,000 hospitalizations each year. The most common types of sports-related injuries among youth are sprains, muscle strains, bone or growth plate injuries, and overuse injuries.

== History ==
=== 20th century ===
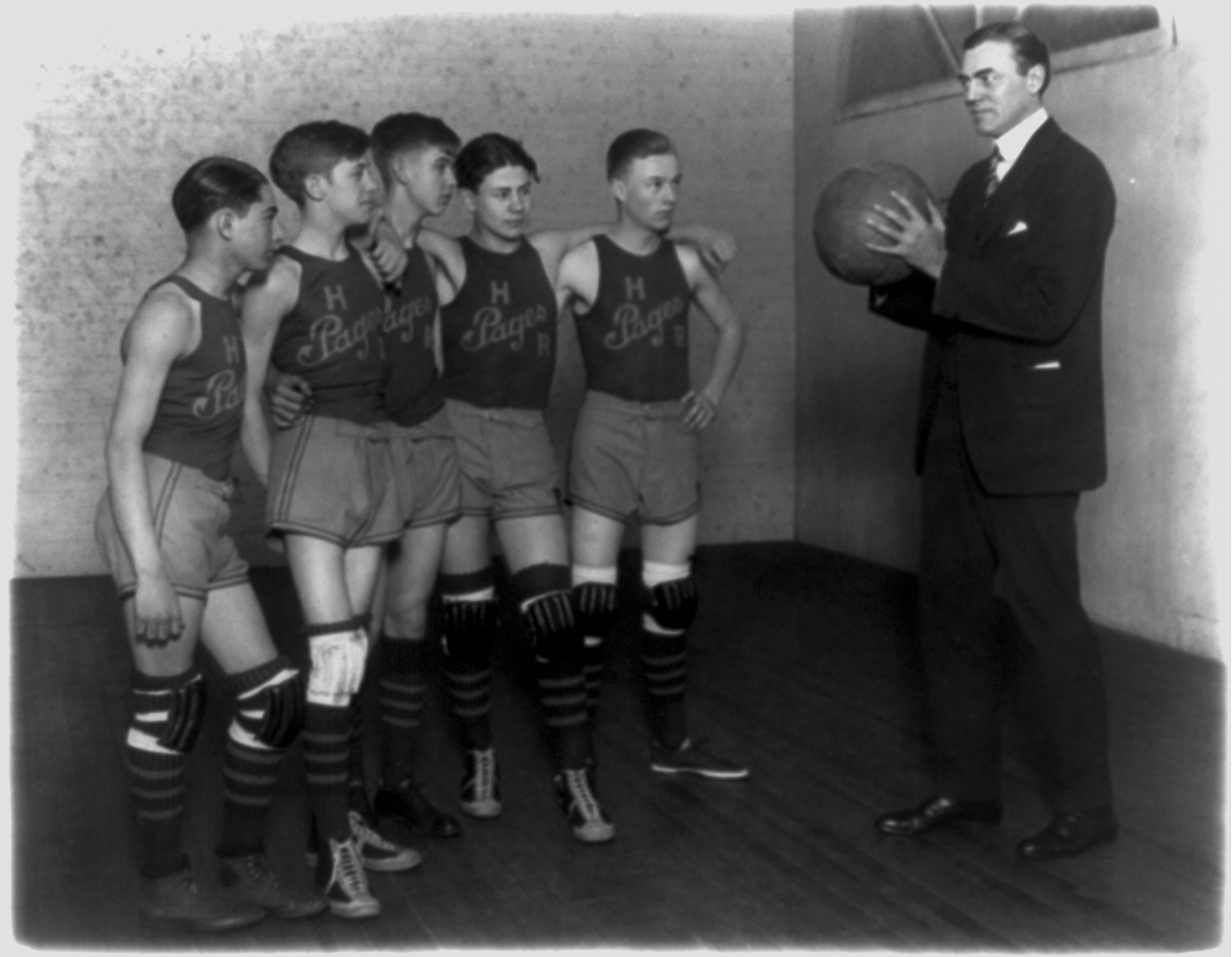
Hamilton Fish III (right) coaching a boys' basketball team in 1927

Youth athletics were popular in 20th-century America. In an attempt to "energize America's youth and transform its fledgling bodies into healthy future citizens" recreation facilities for youth were created. Muscular Christianity was based on the philosophy of sports and exercise strengthening the body which was the shelter of the soul. This philosophy shaped the creation of YMCA programs across America. This led to the invention of basketball and volleyball in the late 19th century. The YMCA also had a female counterpart, the YWCA. The social gospel movement "found sports to be a useful tool to draw inner-city youth to their churches, which often housed gymnasiums." The social gospel movement lead to the creation of settlement houses, where middle-class men and women would study the social problems of the neighborhood and attempt to fix them. The best known settlement house was Hull House in Chicago, which had a community institution which attempted to Americanize immigrants. At Hull House, "they also provided a gym and sponsored athletic teams for both boys and girls, both as part of the acculturation process and the broader goal of improving the social, mental and physical well-being of inner-city residents.

Social agencies such as the YMCA and YWCA, as well as Boys and Girls Clubs, and Boy Scouts and Girl Scouts, provided most of the organized sports to youth in America prior to 1954. While athletics was encouraged by the social gospel movement, youth sports were often organized by youth themselves through the social agencies. This shifted to adults organizing youth sports programs, which was exemplified with the advent of Little League Baseball by Carl Stotz. Little League Baseball was formed in 1939 with a three-team league, while in 1954, there were 70,000 participants. Evidently, organized youth athletics grew rapidly throughout the 20th century in America. There were multiple reasons to support youth athletics programs, but one that was mostly agreed upon was "the notion of providing wholesome, character-building activities to occupy the leisure time of children and youth, to enable them to make the transition from childhood to adulthood."

Within the 20th century, youth athletics were supported for their many believed positive aspects on youth culture. This included the fact that many believed participation in youth athletics would decrease delinquency. In 1965 Coleman wrote, "if it were not for inter-scholastic athletics or something like it, the rebellion against school, the rate of drop-out, and the delinquency of boys might be far worse than they presently are." Also, youth athletics were a way for Jewish immigrants to disprove the stereotypes that they were bookish and weak in the early 20th century. Some Jews pursued professional careers in sports, which provided young Jewish Americans with role models who showed "the possibility and benefits of assimilation," which encouraged more participation in youth athletics. Catholic youths were interested in youth sports to "demonstrate patriotism and morality." Overall, both Catholics and Jews were attracted to youth athletics to "demonstrate American-ness and experience a sense of belonging in the United States." As well as physical fitness, sports were also seen as a way to increase social and moral development in youth. However, there remained some believed negative aspects of youth athletics. This included the fact that "premature sports insolvent may result in undesirable emotional consequences for children." The stress placed on youths during sports could lead to frustration, discouragement and low self-esteem.

=== Race and sports ===
==== African Americans ====
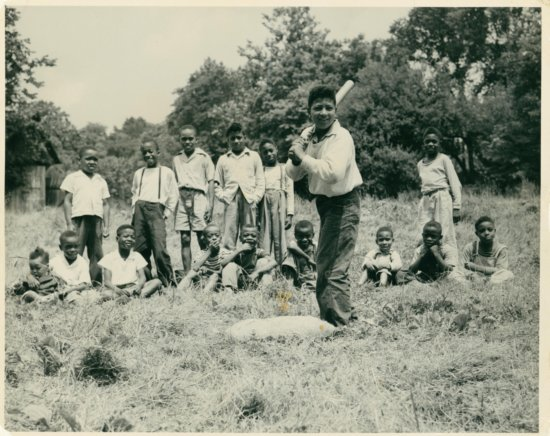
African American children playing baseball at a summer camp in Ohio in 1947

Race has played a role within youth sports as it has enforced racial segregation, but it has also given opportunities to racial minorities. In some ways, youth sports perpetrated segregation, as schools were segregated in the early 20th century. Within African American neighborhoods in America, there was not the same level of public and private sports facilities as in other neighborhoods. However, the streets and vacant lots became centers for youth sports. Segregation and prejudice kept African Americans out of sports facilities, but sports also played a positive role. While schools and subsequently sports teams were created out of segregation, athletics could bring success and accomplishment to schools. Sports were ways that members of the African-American community could gain self-esteem and a sense of community.

==== Native Americans ====
Youth sports were an important way of life for Native Americans within boarding schools. Sports for Native Americans living in boarding schools were so important that they were on a similar level of importance as work and teaching. School sports such as track and field, basketball, and wrestling were activities that some Native Americans felt pride in when they participated. This pride was created by the appeal of competition and success, especially against white teams. Jeff McCloud, former resident of a boarding school for Native Americans, states that experiences in sports "helped him to critically read the pain and degradation of contemporary life on and off Indian reservations as something other than a flaw in Native American character or the inevitable outcome of historical progress." Through these experiences, sport could be a positive aspect of the lives of Native Americans.

=== Gender and sports ===
==== Female ====
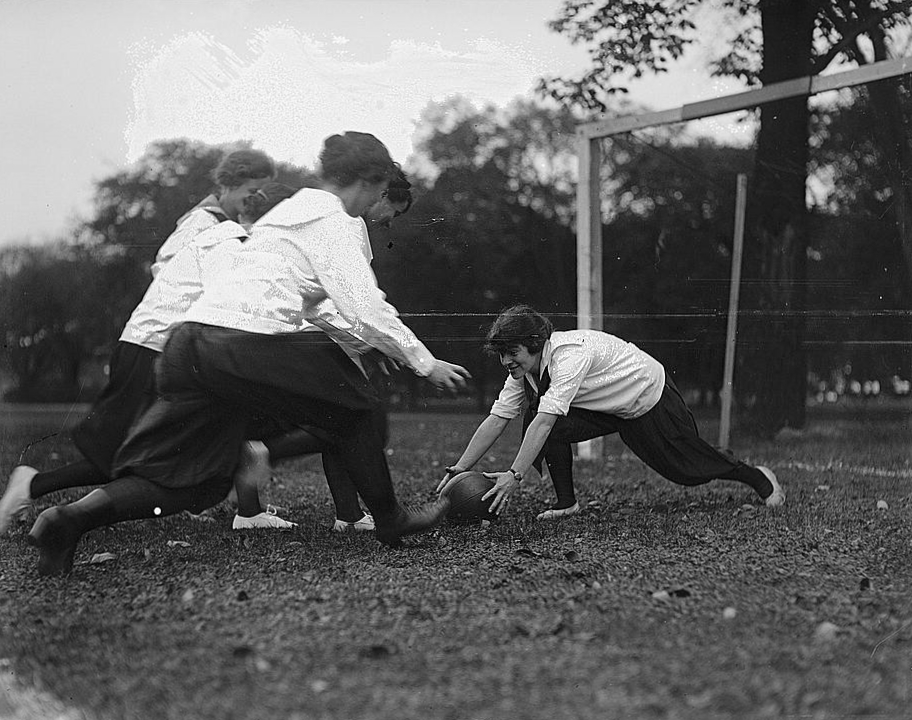
Girls playing association football in Washington, D.C. c. 1919

Female youth athletics was advocated for in the early 20th century because it was "believed that sports improved young women's health and beauty, promoted self-confidence, and offered a source of enjoyment." However, girls' sports were not supported by all Americans as some believed it would lead to injuries and girls acting too aggressive and manly. During the early 20th century, some people felt that sport might reduce a girl's femininity and produce too much competitiveness. Some sports, such as basketball, were modified for girls' play. These modifications included eliminating physical contact and playing half-court games to limit exhaustion. American girls participated in more organized sports after the passage of Title IX in 1972 as they gained more opportunities to do so. It has been stated that "among the many forms of sexism in sports, perhaps the most pervasive and devastating is the lack of equal opportunities for girls to compete in programs similar to those offered for boys." Girls' participation remained much lower than that of boys, but it increased "from 32 percent of the male's participation in 1973–74 to 63 percent in 1994–95." While there are barriers to girls' participation in sports, it grew sizeably in the 20th century.

==== Male ====
Youth athletics also affected the lives of boys as it could be used to define masculinity. Sports were a way to promote bravery, and were tied to masculinity through Muscular Christianity. Sports were even thought to reduce degeneracy as boys were thought to be becoming less brave than their forefathers by some. Betty DeBerg believes that gender divisions increased as some feared that industrialization and city life were changing gender roles. Sports were thought to be a way to increase masculinity in boys and to perpetrate social divisions. Furthermore, the masculine aspect of sports perpetrated through the 20th century has continued an idea of homophobia. Eric Anderson states, "in a time of greatly decreasing cultural and institutional homophobia, institutions of sport have remained steadfast in their production of a homophobic and conservative gender ideology." In 1997, a high school football player wrote that he faced "victimization and personal distress over the profusion of homophobia within his sport..." This homophobic environment lead to depression for the victim. The heightened idea of masculinity has allowed homophobia to also permeate sports. Youth sports within the 20th century enforced masculinity on boys, as well as created an environment filled with homophobia.
