= Arab Cross Country Championships =

International cross country running competition for Arab athletes

The Arab Cross Country Championships (Arabic: البطولة العربية ال لاختراق الضاحية) is an international competition in cross country running between Arabic countries. Organised by the Arab Athletics Federation, it was first contested in 1978 and held its twentieth edition in 2013. Originally hosted on an annual basis, then a biennial schedule from 1990 to 2002, the competition has not been held at regular intervals in recent years.

It features four races, which all combine an individual and team element. There is a men's long race, a women's long race, and two shorter races for both sexes in an under-20 (junior) category. The first three editions of the championships had senior races only and a men's junior race was introduced in 1982. The women's junior race followed in 1986. Short races for the senior athletes were also previously held (starting in 2000) but these were dropped after the discipline stopped being held at the IAAF World Cross Country Championships after 2006.

It is the third most prominent athletics tournament for Arab athletes, after the Arab Athletics Championships and the Athletics at the Pan Arab Games.

== Past winners ==
Edition	Year	Men's winner	Women's winner	Junior men's winner	Junior women's winner
1st	1978	Rabah Zaidi (TUN)	Latifa Derouiche (TUN)	Not held	Not held
2nd	1980	Ahmed Musa Jouda (SUD)	Hassania Darami (MAR)	Not held	Not held
3rd	1981	Ahmed Musa Jouda (SUD)	Hassania Darami (MAR)	Not held	Not held
4th	1982	Féthi Baccouche (TUN)	Not held	Mohamed Saleh Rahji (TUN)	Not held
5th	1983	Boualem Rahoui (ALG)	Hassania Darami (MAR)	Mohamed Saleh Rahji (TUN)	Not held
6th	1984	Abderrazak Bounour (ALG)	Hassania Darami (MAR)	Mustapha Lachaal (MAR)	Not held
7th	1986	Abdellah Boubia (MAR)	Hassania Darami (MAR)	Brahim Boutayeb (MAR)	Hassiba Boulmerka (ALG)
8th	1987	Habib Romdhani (TUN)	Fatima Maama (MAR)	Mourad Bouljadj (ALG)	Nadja Ouaziz (MAR)
9th	1988	Ahmed Saker (SYR)	Khadija Al Matari (JOR)	Mousa Al-Hariri (SYR)	Moha Herzallah (JOR)
10th	1989	Habib Romdhani (TUN)	Fatima Aouda (JOR)	Alyan Sultan Al-Qahtani (KSA)	Sonia Smaïri (TUN)
11th	1990	Awwad Sraiss (JOR)	Souad Ben Toumi (TUN)	Alyan Sultan Al-Qahtani (KSA)	Houda Chabbouh (TUN)
12th	1992	Salah Hissou (MAR)	Najat Ouali (MAR)	Rahmouni Tijani (MAR)	Bouchra Moustaid (MAR)
13th	1994	Alyan Sultan Al-Qahtani (KSA)	Sonia Agoun (TUN)	Hassan Ali Al-Asmari (KSA)	Naïma Ben Amara (TUN)
14th	1996	Alyan Sultan Al-Qahtani (KSA)	Sonia Agoun (TUN)	Mukhlid Al-Otaibi (KSA)	Hana Chaouach (MAR)
15th	1998	Alyan Sultan Al-Qahtani (KSA)	Fatiha Hanika (ALG)	Tayeb Filali (ALG)	Hana Chaouach (MAR)
16th	2000	Mohammed Yagoub (SUD)	Not held	Hamid Nasser Mtiran (KSA)	Not held
17th	2002	Brahim Chettah (ALG)	Nasria Azaïdj (ALG)	Esam Salah Musleh Juaim (YEM)	Habiba Ghribi (TUN)
18th	2006	Sultan Khamis Zaman (QAT)	Nadia Ejjafini (BHR)	Adam Ismaïl (BHR)	Nour Al-Bakour (JOR)
19th	2010	Hasan Mahboob (BHR)	Shitaye Eshete (BHR)	Abdellah Dacha (MAR)	Hayat Allaoui (ALG)
20th	2013	Alemu Bekele (BHR)	Shitaye Eshete (BHR)	Abdesselam Laayouni (TUN)	Hajar Soukhal (ALG)
21st	2014	Salah Badri (TUN)	Amira Ben Amor (TUN)	Abdi Abdillahi Bouh (DJI)	Soumaya Douri (TUN)
22nd	2016	Aweke Ayalew (BHR)	Alia Saeed Mohammed (UAE)	Djamal Direh Abdi (DJI)	Dalila Abdulkadir Gosa (BHR)
23rd	2019	Albert Rop (BHR)	Alia Saeed Mohammed (UAE)	Oussama Cherrad (ALG)	Yousra Hannou (MAR)
24th	2022	Zouhaïr Awad (BHR)	Winfred Yavi (BHR)	Ismail Abdulrazzaq (BHR)	Fatima Al Mufid (MAR)
25th	2023	Albert Rop (BHR)	Winfred Yavi (BHR)	Abdikani Hamid (BHR)	Fatma Afir (MAR)
26th	2024	Hassan Toriss (MAR)	Hanane Bouaggad (MAR)	Elias Awrado (MAR)	Husna Ibn El-Mati (MAR)
27th	2025	Albert Rop (BHR)	Winfred Yavi (BHR)	Osama Al Ridwani (MAR)	Saida Al Bouzi (MAR)
28th	2026	Al Mustapha Akkaoui (MAR)	Sara Zouhir (MAR)	Abdelhakim Bouhou (MAR)	Chaimaa Zahine (MAR)

=== Short course ===
Year	Men's short course winner	Women's short course winner
2000	Mohammed Yagoub (SUD)	Not held
2002	Mohammed Yagoub (SUD)	Nasria Azaïdj (ALG)
2006	Sultan Khamis Zaman (QAT)	Maryam Yusuf Jamal (BHR)

== Statistics ==
=== Men's winner ===
Rank	Nation	Number of first place wins
1	Bahrain	7
2	Tunisia	5
3	Morocco	4
4	Algeria	3
4	Saudi Arabia	3
4	Sudan	3
5	Syria	1
5	Jordan	1
5	Qatar	1

=== Women's winner ===
Rank	Nation	Number of first place wins
1	Morocco	9
2	Bahrain	6
3	Tunisia	5
4	Algeria	2
4	Jordan	2
4	United Arab Emirates	2

=== Junior Men's winner ===
Rank	Nation	Number of first place wins
1	Morocco	7
2	Saudi Arabia	5
3	Algeria	3
3	Bahrain	3
3	Tunisia	3
4	Djibouti	2
5	Yemen	1
5	Syria	1

=== Junior Women's winner ===
Rank	Nation	Number of first place wins
1	Morocco	10
2	Tunisia	5
3	Algeria	3
4	Jordan	2
5	Bahrain	1
