= Joshua Mance =

American sprinter (born 1992)

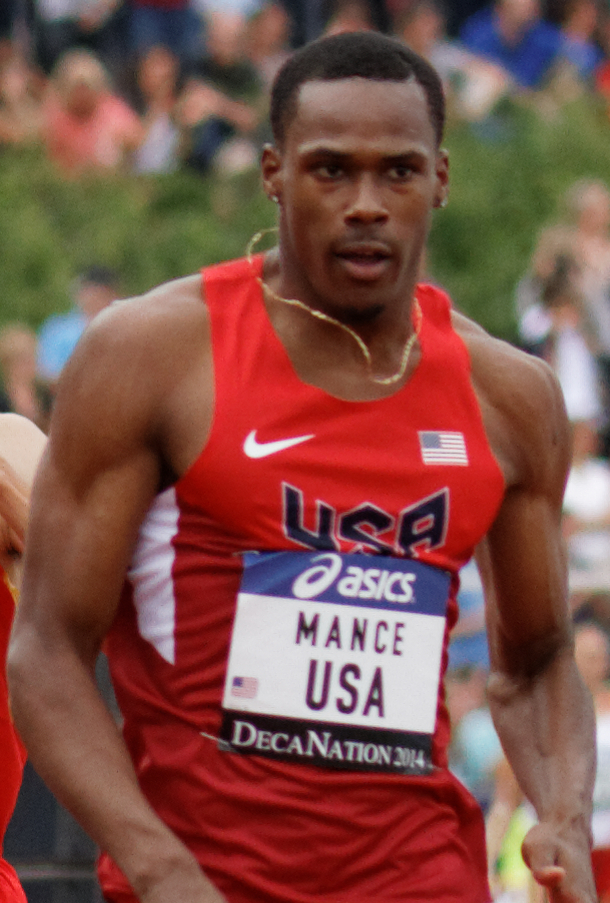
- Mance in 2014

Personal information
- Born: March 21, 1992 (age 34) Pomona, California, U.S.
- Height: 6 ft 3 in (1.91 m)

Sport
- Sport: Running
- Event: 400 metres
- College team: University of Southern California Trojans

Achievements and titles
- Personal best: 400 m: 44.83 (Des Moines 2012)
Medal record
Men's athletics
Representing the United States
Olympic Games
Silver medal – second place	2012 London	4 × 400 m relay
World Championships
Gold medal – first place	2013 Moscow	4 × 400 m relay
World Junior Championships
Gold medal – first place	2010 Moncton	4 × 400 m relay
Pan American Junior Championships
Gold medal – first place	2011 Miramar	400 m
Gold medal – first place	2011 Miramar	4 × 400 m relay
World Youth Championships
Gold medal – first place	2009 Brixen	Medley relay
Silver medal – second place	2009 Brixen	400 m

Ronell Joshua "Josh" Mance (born March 21, 1992) is an American sprinter who specialises in the 400 metres. He attended Don Lugo High School in Chino, California. He transferred to Florida State University in Tallahassee, Florida, after two years at the University of Southern California.

On June 24, 2012, he finished 4th in the 400 meters at the 2012 United States Olympic Trials, a result that won him a position on the United States Olympic team as a member of the 4 × 400 relay. At the Olympics, Mance was part of the precarious American silver medal winning team. In the semi-finals, Mance took the baton from Manteo Mitchell after Mitchell completed half a lap with what turned out to be a broken leg. Mance helped pull the team back into position to qualify for the final. In the final, the winning Bahamas team stacked their team, putting their best, Chris Brown in the lead leg. Mance's second leg pulled the U.S. into contention while the two teams broke away from the field. Mance handed to Tony McQuay who ran a spectacular 43.4 split to take the lead. Mitchell's replacement, hurdler Angelo Taylor was out kicked in the last 50 meters by Ramon Miller to give Bahamas the win.

At the 2010 World Junior Championships in Athletics in Moncton, Canada, Mance won a gold medal over 4 × 400 metres relay. One year earlier, at the 2009 World Youth Championships in Athletics in Brixen, Italy, he received a silver medal over 400 metres, finishing second to future Olympic and World Champion Kirani James. In June 2010, he committed to the USC Trojans.

While at Don Antonio Lugo High School in Chino, California, Mance was a 2010 All-USA high school track and field selection by USA Today. That year he won the CIF California State Meet championship in the 400 meters, and finished 4th in the 200. In 2009, he finished second in the 400 meters to Reggie Wyatt, in the same meet Wyatt set the National High School Record in the 300 hurdles.

At the 2013 World Championships in Athletics in Moscow, Mance was part of the United States team that won the gold medal in the men's 4 × 400 metres relay. He ran in the heats, with the final squad of David Verburg, Tony McQuay, Arman Hall and LaShawn Merritt securing the title in a time of 2:58.71.

In 2014, Mance finished 2nd place in the men's 400m at the USA Outdoor Track and Field Championships at Sacramento State University with a time of 44.89s.

In the 2016 USA Track and Field Olympic Trials, Mance did not qualify for the Men's Open 400m race.

== Personal best ==
Distance	Time	venue
400 m	44.83 s	Des Moines, United States (June 6, 2012)
