= 2009 World Youth Championships in Athletics – Boys' 400 metres =

The Boys' 400 metres at the 2009 World Youth Championships in Athletics was held at the Brixen-Bressanone Sport Arena on 8, 9, and 10 July. The event was won by Kirani James of Grenada, who also won the 200 metres.

== Medalists ==
Gold	Silver	Bronze
Kirani James; Grenada	Joshua Mance; United States	Awad El Karim Makki; Sudan

== Records ==
Prior to the competition, the following records were as follows.

World Youth Best	Obea Moore (USA)	45.14	Santiago, Chile	2 September 1995
Championship Record	Nagmeldin Ali Abubakr (SUD)	46.10	Sherbrooke, Canada	12 July 2003
World Youth Leading	Kirani James (GRN)	45.45	Vieux Fort, St. Lucia	11 April 2009

Kirani James set a new Championship Record and World Youth Leading in the final.

== Heats ==
Qualification rule: first 2 of each heat (Q) plus the 4 fastest times (q) qualified.

== Semifinals ==
Qualification rule: first 2 of each heat (Q) plus the 2 fastest times (q) qualified.

=== Heat 1 ===
Rank	Lane	Name	Nationality	Time	Notes
1	6	Javere Bell	Jamaica	48.03	Q
2	8	Varg Königsmark	Germany	48.04	Q
3	3	Alexander Beck	Australia	48.17	
4	2	Leandro de Araújo	Brazil	48.19	
5	5	Anthony Chemut	Kenya	48.60	
6	4	Lestrod Roland	Saint Kitts and Nevis	48.61	
7	7	Mohamed Chetoui	Algeria	49.40	
8	1	Nadir Abdelrahman	Sudan	49.85	

Key: PB = Personal best, SB = Seasonal best

=== Heat 2 ===
Rank	Lane	Name	Nationality	Time	Notes
1	5	Kirani James	Grenada	46.43	Q
2	3	Joshua Mance	United States	46.65	Q
3	4	Nathan Wake	Great Britain	46.86	q, PB
4	6	Shogo Momiki	Japan	47.51	q
5	7	Hadi Nsamba	Uganda	48.05	PB
6	8	Deon Lendore	Trinidad and Tobago	48.20	PB
7	1	Benjamin Ayesu-Attah	Canada	48.72	
8	2	Michael Kruger	South Africa	48.89	

Key: PB = Personal best, SB = Seasonal best

=== Heat 3 ===
Rank	Lane	Name	Nationality	Time	Notes
1	5	Awad El Karim Makki	Sudan	47.49	Q, SB
2	6	Frazer Wickes	New Zealand	48.05	Q
3	4	Jacques de Swardt	South Africa	48.29	
4	3	Ko Kayada	Japan	48.59	
5	1	Greg Louden	Great Britain	48.71	
6	2	Bertrán Alcaraz	Spain	49.63	
7	7	Nathan Kibiwot	Kenya	50.04	
8	8	Davide Re	Italy	50.63	

Key: PB = Personal best, SB = Seasonal best

== Final ==
Rank	Lane	Name	Nationality	Time	Notes
1st place, gold medalist(s)	3	Kirani James	Grenada	45.24	PB, CR, WYL
2nd place, silver medalist(s)	4	Joshua Mance	United States	46.22	PB
3rd place, bronze medalist(s)	6	Awad El Karim Makki	Sudan	47.15	SB
4	2	Nathan Wake	Great Britain	47.20	
5	7	Frazer Wickes	New Zealand	47.66	
6	5	Javere Bell	Jamaica	47.89	PB
7	1	Shogo Momiki	Japan	48.01	
8	8	Varg Königsmark	Germany	48.12	

Key: PB = Personal best, SB = Seasonal best, CR = Championship record, WYL = World Youth Leading
