= Mohamed Nasir Abbas =

Qatari athletics competitor

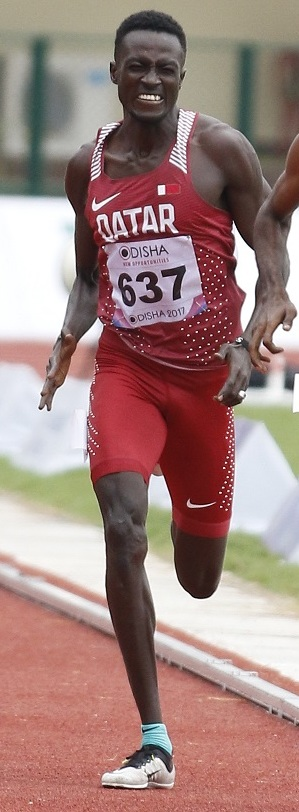
- Mohamed Nasir Abbas in 2017

Personal information
- Born: 1996 (age 29–30)

Sport
- Sport: Athletics
- Event(s): 400 m, 800 m
Medal record
Men's athletics
Representing Qatar
Asian Indoor Championships
Gold medal – first place	2016 Doha	4×400 m
Gold medal – first place	2018 Tehran	4×400 m
Bronze medal – third place	2018 Tehran	400 m

Mohamed Nasir Abbas (born 1996) is a Qatari athlete competing in the 400 and 800 metres.

== Competition record ==
Year	Competition	Venue	Position	Event	Notes
Representing Qatar
2013	Arab Youth Championships	Cairo, Egypt	1st	400 m	47.81
2013	Arab Youth Championships	Cairo, Egypt	1st	Medley relay	1:56.40
2013	World Youth Championships	Donetsk, Ukraine	6th	400 m	47.20
2013	World Youth Championships	Donetsk, Ukraine	4th	Medley relay	1:52.55
2014	Asian Junior Championships	Taipei, Taiwan	1st	400 m	47.31
2014	Asian Junior Championships	Taipei, Taiwan	3rd	4 × 400 m relay	3:09.89
2014	World Junior Championships	Eugene, United States	–	400 m	DQ
2014	Asian Games	Incheon, South Korea	17th (h)	400 m	47.64
2016	Asian Indoor Championships	Doha, Qatar	4th	400 m	47.35
2016	Asian Indoor Championships	Doha, Qatar	1st	4 × 400 m relay	3:08.20
2017	Asian Championships	Bhubaneswar, India	4th	800 m	1:50.16
2017	Asian Indoor and Martial Arts Games	Ashgabat, Turkmenistan	2nd	4 × 400 m relay	3:12.58
2018	Asian Indoor Championships	Tehran, Iran	3rd	400 m	46.76
2019	Asian Championships	Doha, Qatar	13th (sf)	400 m	47.10
2019	World Championships	Doha, Qatar	15th (h)	4 × 400 m relay	3:06.25
2022	GCC Games	Kuwait City, Kuwait	4th	4 × 100 m relay	39.85
2022	GCC Games	Kuwait City, Kuwait	3rd	4 × 400 m relay	3:07.27

== Personal bests ==
Outdoor

- 400 metres – 45.59 (Monachil 2016)
- 800 metres – 1:48.80 (Schifflange 2017)

Indoor

- 400 metres – 47.14 (Doha 2016)
- 800 metres – 1:48.07 (Stockholm 2015)
