= Awad El Karim Makki =

Sudanese sprinter

Personal information
- Nationality: Sudan
- Born: 12 June 1992 (age 34) Khartoum, Sudan

Sport
- Sport: Running
- Event: Sprints

Achievements and titles
- Personal best(s): 200 m: 21.31 (Aleppo 2009); 400 m: 46.34 (Aleppo 2009)
Medal record
Men's athletics
Representing Sudan
African Junior Championships
Gold medal – first place	2011 Gaborone	4×400 m relay
World Youth Championships
Bronze medal – third place	2009 Brixen	400 m

Awad El Karim Makki (born 12 June 1992) is a Sudanese sprinter.

He won the bronze medal over 400 metres at the 2009 World Youth Championships in Athletics.
