= Arab Athletics Federation =

International sports governing body

Arab Athletics Federation الاتحاد العربي لالعاب القوى
- Formation: 15 March 1975
- Type: Sports federation
- Members: 20 member federations
- President: Suleiman Awwad al-Zaidi
- Website: www.arabathletics.org

The Arab Athletics Federation (Arabic: الاتحاد العربي لالعاب القوى) is an international governing body for the sport of athletics.

It was founded on 15 March 1975 at a conference of Arab nations in Rabat, Morocco, with the aim of improving the quality of the sport in the Arab world and foster greater international co-operation within the region. The constitution of the federation ensures that there are a president and two vice-presidents – one from an Asian Arab country and the other from an African Arab country. It also recognises and works with the International Association of Athletics Federations (IAAF), the Asian Athletics Association and the Confederation of African Athletics. Suleiman Awwad al-Zaidi of Saudi Arabia is the current president.

The organisation's foremost event, the biennial Arab Athletics Championships, was held two years after the federation's formation. A year later, the Arab Cross Country Championships was established. The Arab Junior Athletics Championships followed in 1984, and the Arab Youth Athletics Championships was founded in 2004. The federation also supports a circuit of track and field meetings to promote qualification into its championships.

The organisation also publishes an athletics periodical covering news of Arab athletes and competitions: Arab Hero Magazine (Arabic: مجلة البطل العربي, Al Batal Al Arabi).

== Member federations ==
- Algeria: Fédération Algérienne d'Athlétisme
- Bahrain: Bahrain Athletics Association
- Djibouti: Fédération Djiboutienne d'Athlétisme
- Egypt: Egyptian Athletic Federation
- Iraq: Iraqi Athletics Federation
- Jordan: Jordan Athletics Federation
- Kuwait: Kuwait Athletics Federation
- Lebanon: Fédération Libanaise d'Athlétisme
- Libya: Libyan Athletics Federation
- Morocco: Fédération Royale Marocaine d'Athlétisme
- Oman: Oman Athletic Association
- Palestine: Palestine Athletic Federation
- Qatar: Qatar Athletics Federations
- Saudi Arabia: Saudi Arabian Athletics Federation
- Sudan: Sudan Athletic Association
- Syria: Syrian Arab Athletic Federation
- Tunisia: Fédération Tunisienne d'Athlétisme
- United Arab Emirates: United Arab Emirates Athletics Federation
- Yemen: Yemen Athletics Federation

== Competitions ==
- Arab Athletics Championships – biennial athletics event for senior athletes
- Arab Cross Country Championships – biennial cross country running event for senior and junior athletes
- Arab U23 Athletics Championships – athletics event for under-23 athletes
- Arab Junior Athletics Championships – biennial athletics event for junior (under-20) athletes
- Arab Youth Athletics Championships – biennial athletics event for youth (under-18) athletes
- Arab U16 Athletics Championships – athletics event for under-16 athletes
