= Youth sports =

Sport practiced by youth

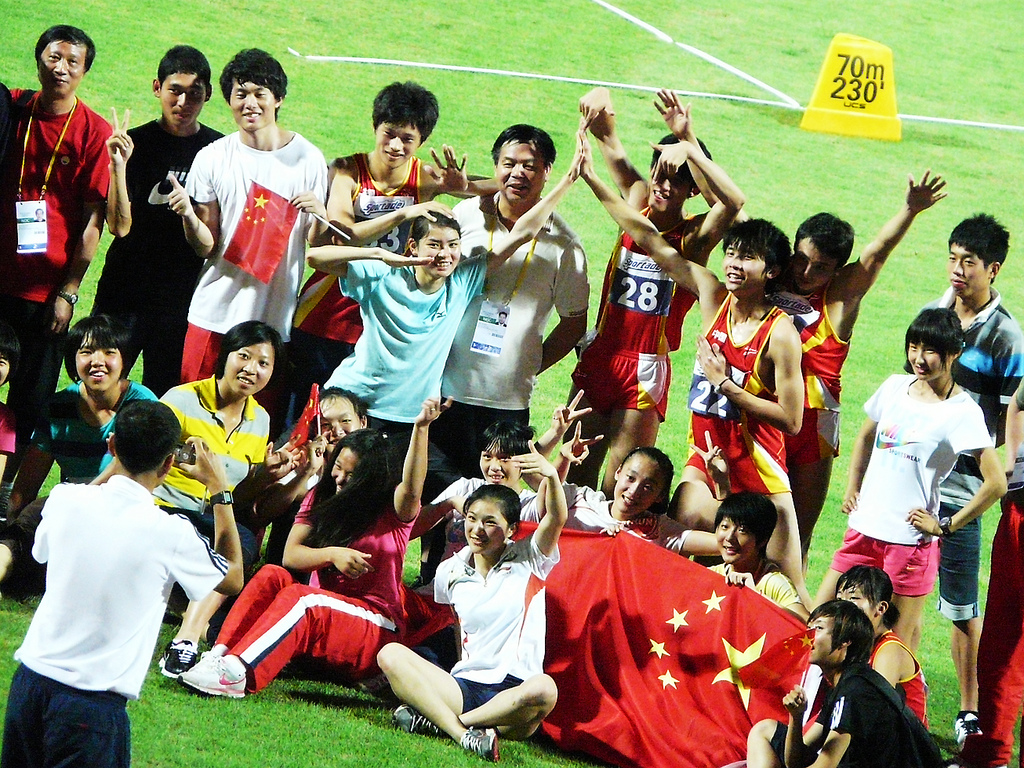
Youth athletes at the 2010 Summer Youth Olympics

Youth sports is any sports event where competitors are younger than adult age, whether children or adolescents. Youth sports includes school sports at primary and secondary level, as well as sports played outside the education system, whether informally or organized.

In sports studies and public policy contexts, an age limit of 18 (the age of majority) is usual in discussing "youth sport". Not all sports governing bodies define "youth" as "under-18": while the Youth Olympic Games and the FA Youth Cup are for under-18s, the LEN Junior Water Polo European Championship is for under-17s. Many youth sport programmes have multiple age levels, for example under-8, under-10, under-12, etc. It is not, however, only underage sport that may be considered as "youth" sport; for example, the existence of the World Rowing U23 Championships recognizes that adults aged 18–22 have not yet reached peak condition. Moreover, many definitions consider postsecondary/collegiate students ranging from the ages of 17 to 25 participating in sports to be "youth" as well.

Sport is one of the most popular activities among youth all over the world. The most popular sports are association football, basketball, running and swimming. In 2008, a United Nations-sponsored report on "Sport for Development and Peace" stated:

Sport can contribute significantly to international, national and local efforts to give children a healthy start. Sport can help those who have not received a good start, and equip youth with the information, skills, personal and social resources, and support needed to make key life transitions successfully.

== Benefits of sport ==
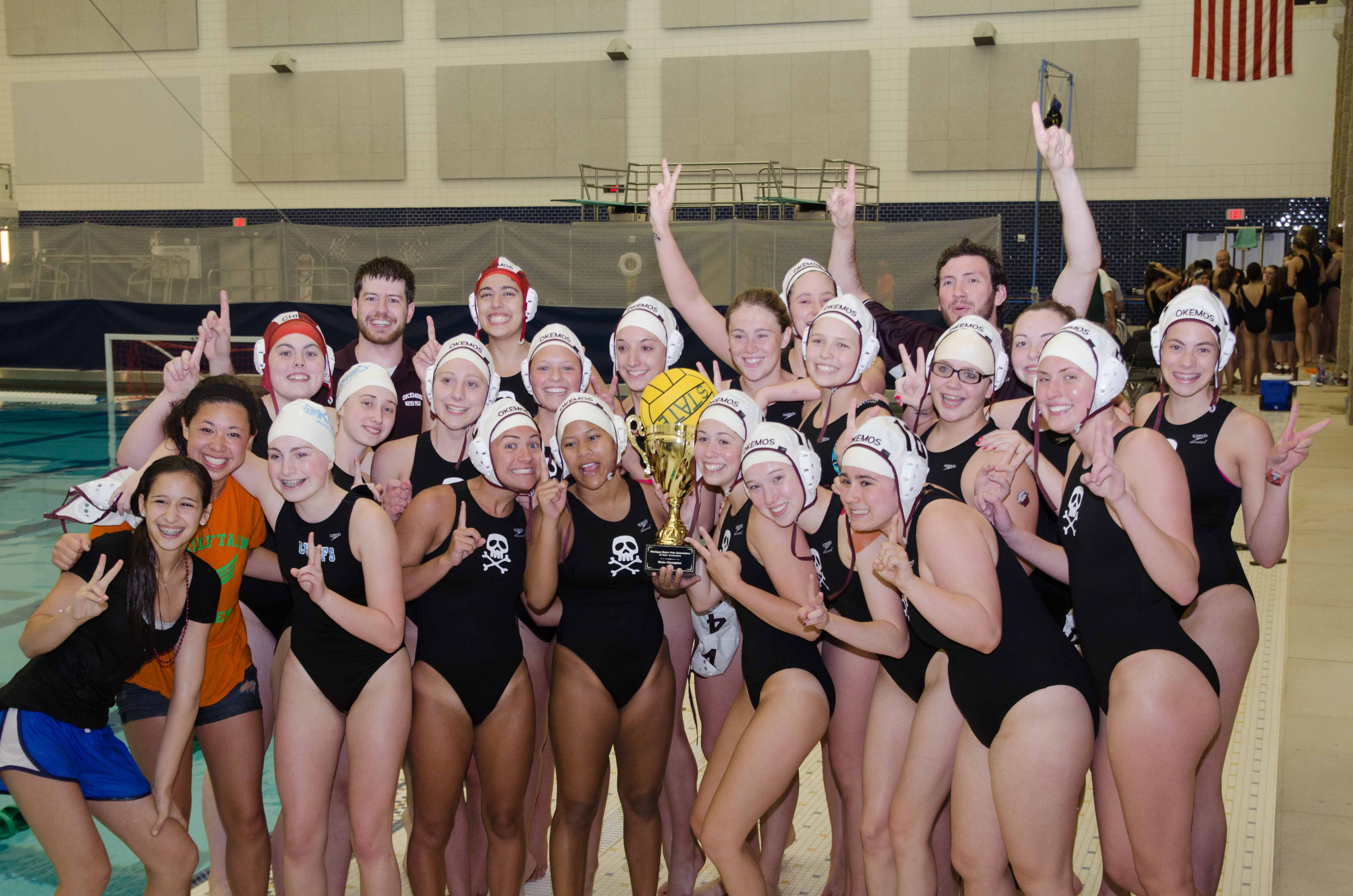
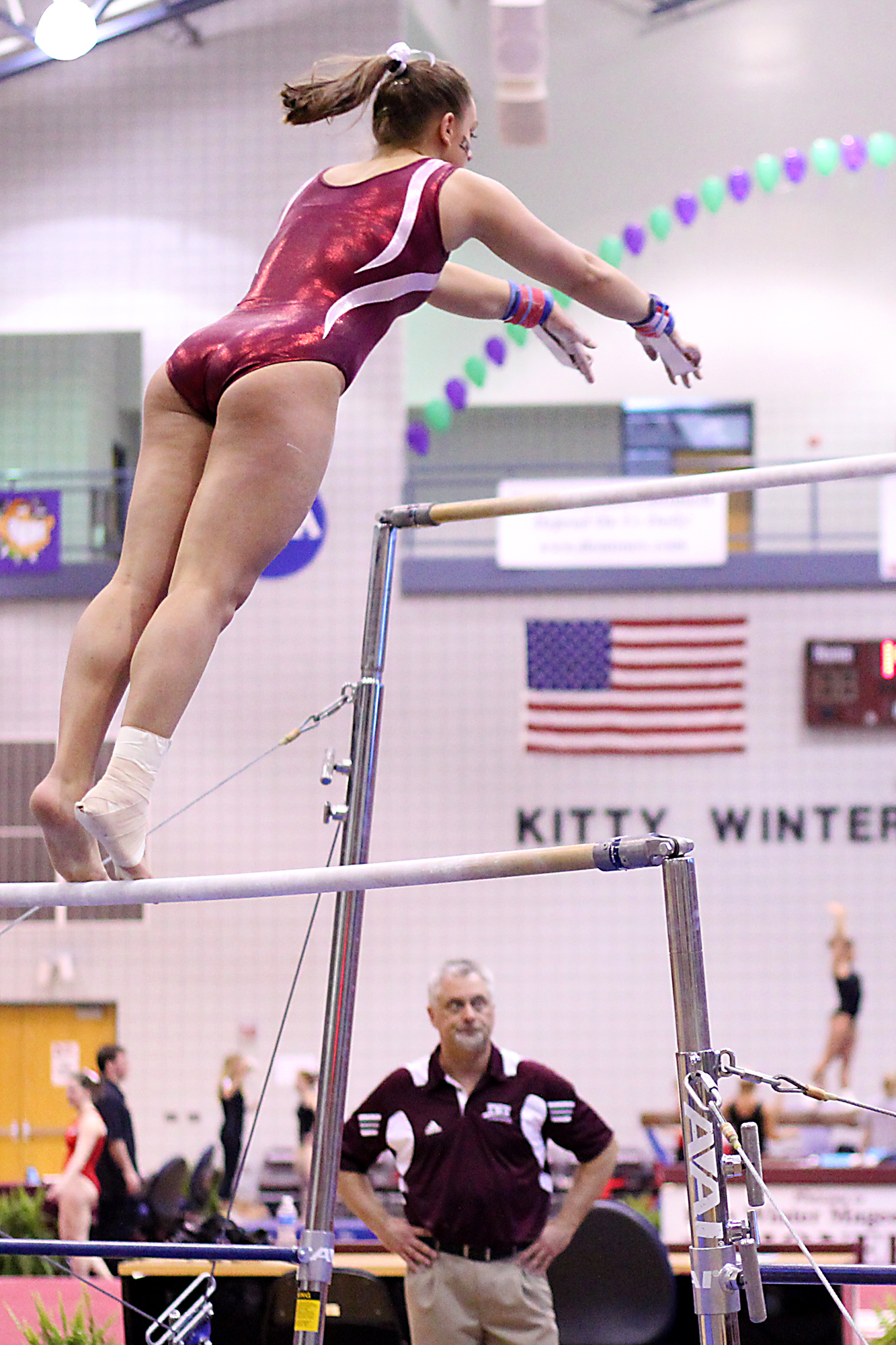
Left: A U.S. high school girls' water polo team (with their male coaches in background) posing with their trophy. Right: A U.S. university girl practising a difficult gymnastics manoeuvre under the watchful eyes of her coach.

Participation in organized sports during childhood and adolescence has important benefits for physical, psychological, and social health. Sport-based youth development programs outside of school promote a wide range of learning and life skill development. Involvement in youth athletics encourages young people to live healthy and happy lifestyles, avoiding common issues such as obesity and depression. However, sport involvement goes beyond health, other benefits allow them to form and strengthen affective relationships, teach youth to value self-improvement over winning, how to be competitive in a competitive society, and to work culturally with different peers and authorities. In the classroom, high school student-athletes are far less likely to drop out of school and 15% more likely to attend college.

The practice of sport fosters young people's physical and emotional health and builds valuable social connections. It also offers opportunities for play and self-expression especially for those young people with few other opportunities. Sport also acts as a healthy alternative to harmful actions such as drug abuse, and involvement in crime. Beyond the individual, sport involvement cuts barriers that divide societies, making it a powerful tool to support conflict prevention both symbolically on the global level and practically within communities.

== Communication in sport ==
Communication plays a critical role in the development and success of youth sport programs. Effective communication among youth athletes, coaches, and parents improves team cohesion, facilitates skill development, and creates an environment that promotes physical, social, and emotional growth.

=== Types of communication in sports ===
Verbal communication includes direct instructions, feedback, motivational speeches, and discussions. It should be clear, concise, and appropriate for the age and comprehension level of the athletes. Nonverbal communication encompasses body language, facial expressions, gestures, and eye contact, which are important for reinforcing verbal messages, showing empathy, and building rapport with athletes.

Written communication involves the use of training plans, feedback forms, emails, and other written materials to convey information. This type of communication ensures that important information is recorded and can be referred back to enhancing understanding and consistency

=== Strategies for effective communication ===
Coaches and athletes should practice active listening to ensure mutual understanding and respect. This involves giving full attention, acknowledging messages, and providing appropriate responses. Emphasizing positive behaviors and achievements helps in building confidence and motivation among youth athletes. Maintaining consistency and transparency in communication helps in building trust and credibility within the team. Incorporating visual aids such as diagrams, videos, and demonstrations can enhance understanding and retention of information.

== Concerns in sport participation ==
The number of dropouts reaches a peak in the adolescent years. The most important reason for not playing sport are "not having enough time," "no interest anymore," and "other leisure activities".

=== Negative experiences ===
Negative experiences can be created through a sport that is overly focused on competition and winning at all costs or that fails to place the healthy development of youth at the center of the experience. Such negative experiences may result in a young person's low self-esteem, involve them in negative relationships, encourage poor sportsmanship, permit aggression and violence, allow racism, perpetuate gender discrimination, or expose them to psychological, sexual and commercial exploitation and abuse. Many of these negative experiences can be avoided when parents and coaches are chosen carefully, ensuring that programs offer a positive development experience for youth. In response to the evidence of negative experiences in sport for many youth, especially low-income youth, youth of color, overweight youth, and LGBTQ youth, sports-based youth development (SBYD) emerged. Sports-based youth development is a theory and practice model for programs to place the mental and physical health of a youth over their athletic success. Programs that use SBYD to define program activities and train staff members generally provide free or reduced-cost programming to reduce the barriers low-income youth face when playing sports. These programs are typically found in low-income and under-served neighborhoods, but any sports coach or sports program can apply SBYD principles.

=== Injuries ===
Injuries have always been of concern in terms of sport but youth are much more susceptible to injury considering both their immature musculoskeletal system and increasingly high intensity training. According to the U.S. Centers for Disease Control, participation in organized sports is on the rise. Nearly 30 million children and adolescents participate in youth sports in the United States. The most common types of sports-related injuries among youth are sprains, muscle strains, bone or growth plate injuries, and overuse injuries.

Early sports specialization has long been typical among children and teenagers in gymnastics, swimming, diving and figure skating, especially if they have aspirations of being competitive at elite levels. The main purpose for athletes to specialize in sport is to become a better player in order to increase their chances of making it to the big leagues or to become an elite athlete. However, the data does not prove that specializing as a youth will be enough to make a child into a successful athlete later on (Latorre-Roman, Pinillos, & Robles, 2018). Youth athletes that are considered less specialized have been found to exhibit more all around athleticism and other advantages that specialized athletes do not benefit. (Rugg, Kador, Feley, & Pandya, 2018). Studies have supported that decreasing specialization at a young age will lower the rates of injuries for the players while increasing playing times and length of careers compared to athletes who specialized as a youth (Rugg, Kador, Feley, & Pandya, 2018). Still, sport specializers tend to dramatically outweigh those who stayed multi sport athletes because of the standards people place on sports and how valuable a sports career can be. As youth athletes exhibit skills at higher levels than their peers at a young age, parents, coaches, and the athletes themselves tend to focus on that sport in order to take advantage of their natural skills. parents, coaches, and athletes should know that showing promise in sport from a young age does not guarantee future success as competition levels rise and the athlete develops as a person (Latorre-Roman, Pinillos, & Robles, 2018).

Noting that specializing in a sport at a young age by no means guarantees success, it is most important understand that sport specialization in youth can lead to higher injury rates throughout one's sports career (Mcguine et al., 2017). Research has found that high school athletes that specialize in one sport are more likely to be injured than athletes that play multiple sports (Mcguine et al., 2017). Further, students who were classified to play moderate amount of sports were found to have less injuries than those who specialized in only one (McGuine et al., 2017) This helps to emphasize the importance of sport diversity in youth athletes and its impact on preventing injuries. Looking at sport specialization more in depth, researchers have suggested that athletes, coaches, and parents monitor the weekly, monthly, and yearly participation rates for youth athletes in a single sport (Post et al., 2017) It is generally recognized that athletes should not participate in more than 8 months worth of intense sport practice and no more than an athlete's age in hours of practice a week (post et al., 2017). Also, experts recommend that all athletes engage in a wide variety of athletic activities, including unstructured athletic activities such as playing outside, until at least the age of 15.'

=== Over-involvement ===
Teenage athletes have been pushed by parents and sport programmes to train excessively and to dedicate an enormous amounts of time and money to sport. Some youth report playing up to eight football games per week, sometimes in the hope of earning one of a few university scholarships. Sleep, schoolwork, family time, and other normal activities are sacrificed to sport.

A few countries are beginning to regulate sport programmes to reduce this problem. Finland, which has a strong track record in the Olympic Games, is seen as a model. In 2018, after the death of an apparently healthy but exhausted teenage athlete, the government of Puerto Rico required that all youth sport programmes be regulated. Under the initial rules in Puerto Rico, children under the age of 9 cannot play in tournaments or officially keep score, and youth under the age of 16 cannot play more than three games per week. As of 2020, there is widespread sentiment that the overall system must change, but programmes in each of the regulated sports, and the coaches and other staff whose pay depends upon operating these lucrative tournaments and expensive travel teams, are lobbying for exemptions that will permit their own businesses to continue as before.

== Inequalities in sport ==
=== Social class ===
Global South nations tend to have less access to organized sports because the politics of their countries do not have the resources to have leisure and entertainment influence their lives. Children in Global South nations have less opportunity to attend school where majority of organized sport takes place. Sport programs within the community provide children marginalized by poverty, gender, disability, family dissolution, ethno-cultural background and conflict with family, crime and other lack of opportunity.

In Global North nations, the evolving and complex youth sport system requires significant resources such as time, access, and money to develop as an athlete and play competitively. The financial costs involved in facilitating organized sport at an elite level ranges from an average of a few thousand dollars per year, to more than 20,000 dollars per year in some sports. For these financial reasons, participation is not feasible for a majority of kids growing up in lower income families.

In recent years, youth sports have become more expensive in the United States. The financial burden of organized sports has grown, and children from low-income families are less likely to participate. The single greatest predictor of whether a child will start playing organized sports young, is whether their household income exceeds $100,000 per year.

=== Gender ===
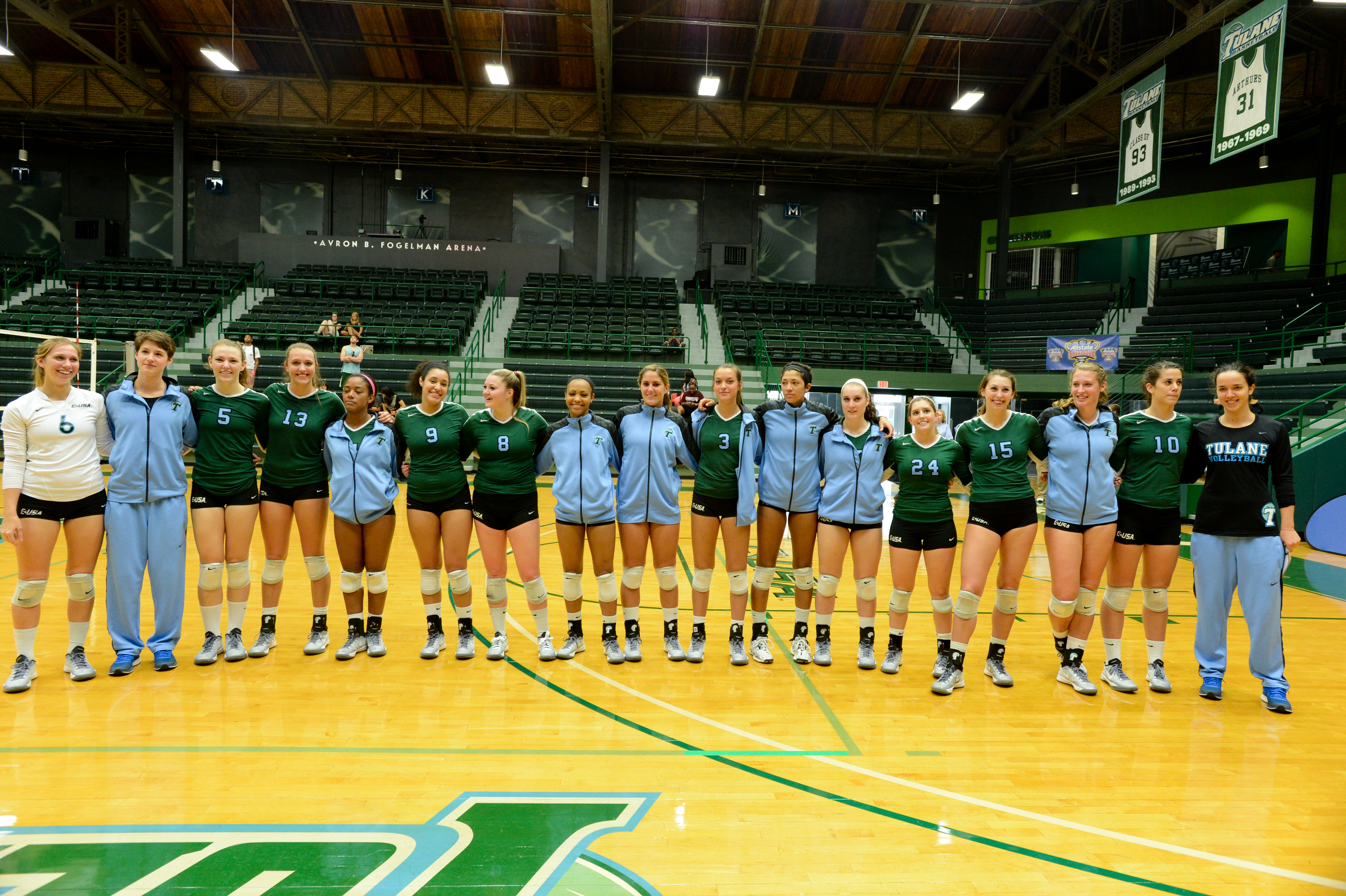
Women's volleyball team of a U.S. university.

Gender conditioning often starts at an early age where boys and girls are taught behave differently and participate in certain activities. While there is no doubt that girls' sport participation has skyrocketed in recent decades, a gender inequality in youth sports still exists. The "separate but equal" ideal of gender in youth sports is very much prevalent in society and its contradictions inherent a strategy that pushes for both individual equal opportunity and categorical separation of the sexes. Team sport participation peaks at age 11 and participation in sport by girls are high and continuing to increase. However, frequent participation by both boys and girls in team sports is declining.

Girls are more likely to enter sport later than boys and are more likely to take part in cheerleading, dance, competitive jump roping and volleyball while boys tend to stick with more traditional sports such as baseball, basketball and football. No matter the sport, the benefits of participating remain. With this said, the gender gap in the global south is much larger than that of the global north based on significant power relations and religious beliefs, specifically within Muslim communities in countries like Bosnia, Egypt, Morocco, Iran, Iraq, Syria and Turkey. For many, religion is a way of life in which sporting and educational institutions are culturally constructed by cultural and religious dynamics, as well as political, social, and economic factors.

=== Spatial divisions ===
The gap between participation in sport in the global south and the global north can be due to a shortage of physical education, a lack of financing, few sport facilities and little equipment and no capacity to host major sporting event in the global south. Other limitations for people living in certain countries may include a lack of accessible transportation, education and lack of understanding of the sport. There are also several social and cultural barriers faced by youth living in the global south that impact sport participation. A few of these are religion, culture and language.

== Youth sports programs ==
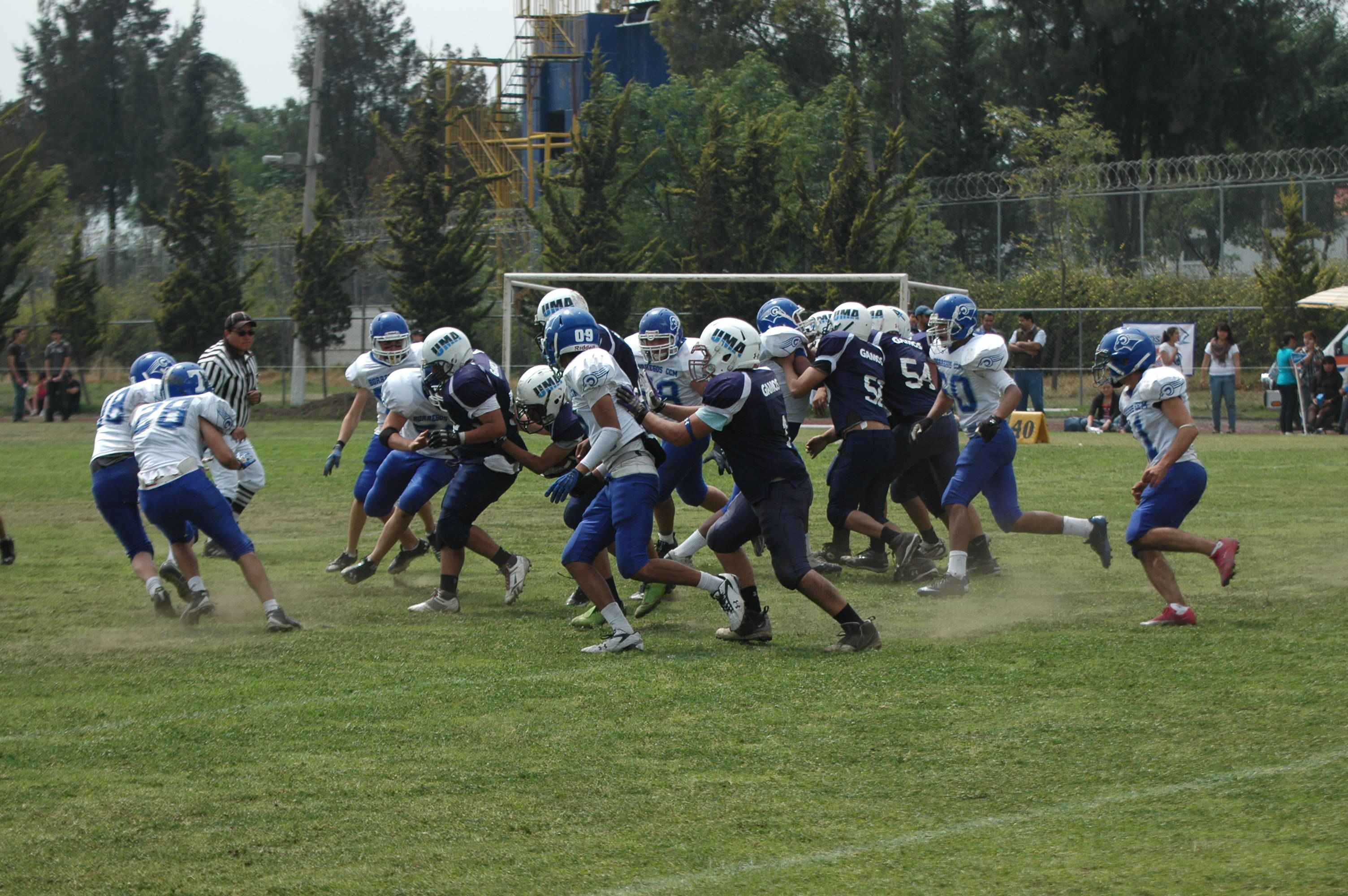
Game of one of the youth divisions of the Borregos Salvages American football associated with Monterrey Institute of Technology and Higher Education, Mexico City.

There are typically two types of youth sport programs. One is sponsored by schools and the other is sponsored by city recreational departments and agencies. Generally school sponsored programs have qualified coaches and dedicated facilities for their sports but that is not always the case. Requirements for coaches for school sponsored programs vary from state to state, but the standard for the head coach of a major sport is usually a teaching certificate, with some coaching experience and training. Non-school youth sports programs operate in a different way and use volunteers as coaches. They have to find places to practice such as open gyms. Youths in these programs are assigned or drafted to different teams depending on the program.

The Sport for Development and Peace organization was found in research by Simon Darnell to have positive outcomes on the twelve-year-old boys participating in the program by promoting time management and personal responsibility. This helped the boys fit into the goals of self-regulation required in neoliberal societies. The nature of sport in itself also showcased leaders and those willing to make sacrifices for the sake of their team and also their families.

The Culture, Education, Sport and Ethics program (CESEP) is an international outreach initiative to engage teachers and student from different countries and cultures in the dialogue of healthy sport. This program seeks to create collaboration among teachers, students under 18, and counselors to exchange ideas about sports and culture in an educational program.

The International Olympic Committee's Sports for Hope program, located in Lusaka, Zambia, enhances national sports development through organized sports competitions, camps and clinics. They organize seminars for coaches and sports administrators as well as community development services. The program has an educational component about important societal issues, including girls' empowerment, civic participation, HIV/AIDS, malaria and other health issues for athletes and the general public. The center offers indoor and outdoor sports fields, lockers, a gym, a boxing hall, classrooms and a variety of sports.

== Games and championships ==
- Asian Youth Games
- Australian Youth Olympic Festival
- Commonwealth Youth Games
- European Youth Olympic Festival
- IAAF World Youth Championships in Athletics, organized by the IAAF every 2 years
- Youth Olympic Games

== See also ==
- Amateur sports
- Cheerleading
- College athletics
- Under-18 athletics
- Youth sports in the United States
