= Ryan Williams (discus thrower) =

Namibian athlete (born 2000)

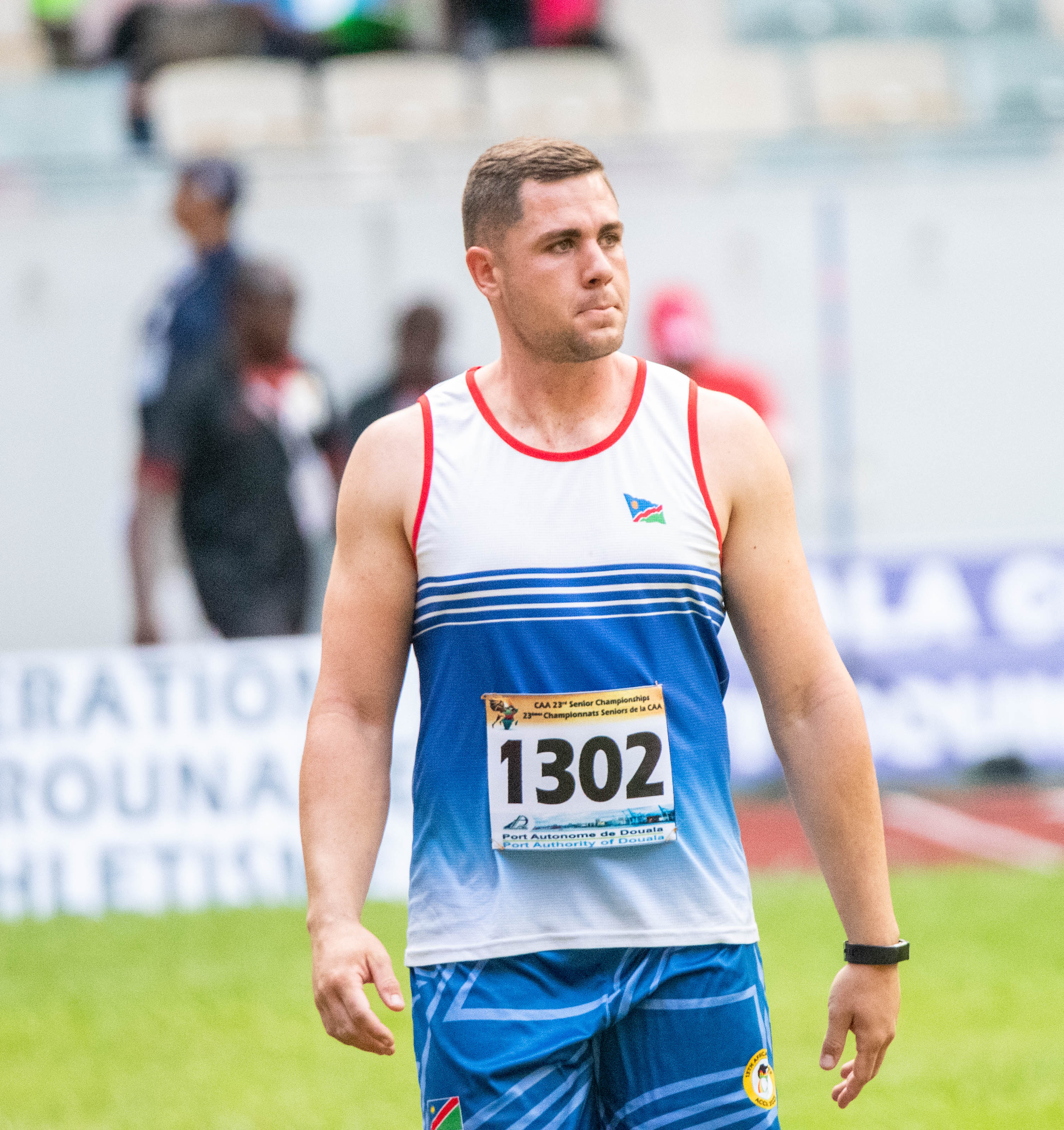

Personal information
- Nationality: Namibian
- Born: 26 March 2000 (age 26) Gobabis, Namibia.
- Height: 193 cm (6 ft 4 in)
- Weight: 115 kg (254 lb)

Sport
- Sport: Athletics
- Event: Discus

Achievements and titles
- Personal bests: Discus: 61.15m (2023) NR
Medal record
Athletics
Representing Namibia
African Games
Bronze medal – third place	2023 Accra	Discus throw
African Championships
Gold medal – first place	2026 Accra	Discus throw
Bronze medal – third place	2024 Douala	Discus throw
Bronze medal – third place	2022 Mauritius	Discus throw
African U20 Championships
Bronze medal – third place	2019 Abidjan	Discus
Bronze medal – third place	2019 Abidjan	Shot put

Ryan Williams (born 26 March 2000) is a Namibian discus thrower. He is the national record holder and 2026 African Champion. He was a medalist at the 2023 African Games and the 2022 and 2024 African Championships in Athletics.

== Biography ==
Williams broke the Namibian national record in the discus throw for the first time in 2017 as a teenager while competing in Zimbabwe, with a throw of 45.95 metres. Two years later, as a 19-year-old, Williams broke his own record by more than 2.5 metres in Germany with a new mark of 48.54 metres. In 2019, he won a fourth consecutive discus title at the Namibian Championships, while he won a second gold medal that year in the shot put event with a distance of 14.08m. That year, Williams won two medals at the 2019 African Junior Athletics Championships in Abidjan, Ivory Coast, winning bronze in both the U20 men's discus and shot-put. He placed fourth in the discus throw at the 2019 African Games in Rabat.

Having increased the national record to 53.92m, he threw 56.70 at Athletics Namibia's Grand Prix 4 in November 2020. That month, he cleared 56 metres again to win the Namibian national title.

Williams later studied at North-West University in South Africa and competed at the 2022 Commonwealth Games in Birmingham, England, narrowly missing a place in the final with a seventh-place finish in his qualifying group with a distance of 55.54 metres. He won the bronze medal in the discus at the 2022 African Championships in Athletics in Mauritius with a throw of 56.70 metres.

In April 2023, Williams broke his national discus record by more than three metres while competing in Potchefstroom, South Africa, with a distance of 61.15 metres.

In March 2024, Williams won the bronze medal in the discus at the delayed 2023 African Games in Accra with a throw of 55.42 metres behind Oussama Khennoussi of Algeria and gold medal winner South African Victor Hogan. In June 2024, Williams competed at the 2024 Africa Athletics Championships in Douala, Cameroon, and won the bronze medal in the men's discus final behind Khennoussi and Victor Hogan. Williams came third with a distance of 56.78 metres.

Williams won the gold medal in the discus throw at the 2026 African Athletics Championships in Accra with a throw of 57.45 metres. He placed eighth in the discus throw at the 2026 Commonwealth Games in Glasgow, Scotland.
