= 2024 African Championships in Athletics – Women's high jump =

Women's high jump at the 2024 African Championships in Athletics
- Venue: Japoma Stadium
- Location: Douala, Cameroon
- Dates: 22 June
- Competitors: 12 from 9 nations
- Winning height: 1.87 m

Medalists
gold medal	Rose Yeboah	Ghana
silver medal	Temitope Simbiat Adeshina	Nigeria
bronze medal	Fatoumata Balley	Guinea

The women's high jump event at the 2024 African Championships in Athletics was held on 22 June in Douala, Cameroon.

== Records ==
Records before the 2024 African Athletics Championships
Record	Athlete (nation)	Height (m)	Location	Date
World record	Stefka Kostadinova (BUL)	2.09	Rome, Italy	30 August 1987
African record	Hestrie Cloete (RSA)	2.06	Paris, France	31 August 2003
Championship record	Lucienne N'Da (CIV)	1.95	Belle Vue Harel, Mauritius	28 June 1992
Championship record	Hestrie Cloete (RSA)	1.95	Radès, Tunisia	7 August 2002
World leading	Yaroslava Mahuchikh (UKR)	2.04	Cottbus, Germany	31 January 2024
African leading	Rose Amoanimaa Yeboah (GHA)	1.97	Eugene, United States	8 June 2024

== Results ==
Rank	Athlete	Nationality	1.60	1.65	1.70	1.75	1.78	1.81	1.84	1.87	1.90	Result	Notes
1st place, gold medalist(s)	Rose Yeboah	Ghana	–	–	–	–	o	xxo	o	xo	xxx	1.87	
2nd place, silver medalist(s)	Temitope Simbiat Adeshina	Nigeria	–	–	–	o	o	o	xo	xxx		1.84	
3rd place, bronze medalist(s)	Fatoumata Balley	Guinea	–	–	–	o	xo	o	xo	xxx		1.84	
4	Laura Salin-Eyike	Cameroon	–	–	o	o	o	xxx				1.78	
5	Yvonne Robson	South Africa	o	o	o	o	xxo	xxx				1.78	
5	Pwoch Omod	Ethiopia	o	o	o	o	xxo	xxx				1.78	
7	Safae Maskani	Morocco	o	xo	o	o	xxx					1.75	
8	Michelle Ngozo	South Africa	o	o	o	xo	xxx					1.75	
9	Darina Hadil Rezik	Algeria	–	–	o	xxx						1.70	
10	Zeddy Jesire Chongwo	Kenya	o	o	xxx							1.65	
10	Esther Obenewaa	Ghana	o	o	xxx							1.65	
	Adele Prakale Dairou	Cameroon	xxx									NM	

== See also ==
- Athletics at the 2023 African Games – Women's high jump
