= Stephen Mozia =

Nigerian shot putter and discus thrower

Personal information
- Born: August 16, 1993 (age 32) Hackensack, New Jersey, United States
- Education: Cornell University
- Height: 1.91 m (6 ft 3 in)
- Weight: 124 kg (273 lb)

Sport
- Country: Nigeria
- Sport: Track and field
- Events: Shot put Discus Throw
- College team: Cornell Big Red

Achievements and titles
- Personal bests: Outdoor Shot Put 21.76 (2016); Indoor Shot Put 21.11 (2016); Discus Throw 62.80 (2014)
Medal record
Men's athletics
Representing Nigeria
African Championships
Silver medal – second place	2016 Durban	Discus throw
Bronze medal – third place	2014 Marrakesh	Discus throw
Bronze medal – third place	2016 Durban	Shot put

Stephen Ogochukwu Mozia (born August 16, 1993) is a US-born Nigerian shot putter. He is a three-time African Championships Bronze medallist. He also represented his country at the 2014 and 2016 World Indoor Championships, as well as the 2016 Summer Olympics.

== Personal ==
He was born and raised in the United States though his parents were born in Nigeria. Early in 2014, due to his dual citizenship, began competing for the Nigeria National Team. He attended Hackensack High School where he was a standout athlete. He initially started out as a sprinter but decided to move to the throws because he was too slow. Mozia is a Mechanical Engineering graduate of Cornell University, where he was a member of the Quill and Dagger society. He currently works as the OT practice manager for Optiv.

== Career ==
After winning the US Junior championships in 2012, he represented the US at the World Junior Championships where he finished in 10th place. In 2014, Mozia set college bests of 62.80 m and 20.79 m in the Discus Throw and Indoor Shot Put. His 20.79 m throw at the Ivy League Championships eclipsed Adam Nelson's Ivy League Indoor Record. He is also a two-time Ivy League Track Athlete of the Year. He finished twice as runner-up in the Shot Put at the 2014 NCAA Indoor and Outdoor Division 1 National Championships both times behind Ryan Crouser.

Later on in 2014, he represented Nigeria at the Glasgow Commonwealth Games and then at the African Championships in Marrakesh. He won a bronze medal in the Discus Throw behind South African athletes, Victor Hogan and Russel Tucker. This led to him being selected for the IAAF Continental Cup as a representative for Africa.

Mozia broke into new territory in 2016, throwing over 21 metres in the Shot Put. He threw 21.03 m to set a Nigerian indoor record and bettered that twice eventually ending the indoor season with a 21.11 m throw. He however couldn't match this at the Portland Indoor Championships. In Portland, he finished in 12th place with a best of 19.84 m and had two fouls. He won Nigeria's first medal at the 2016 Durban African Championships, a bronze medal in the Shot Put. He finished behind South African Jaco Engelbrecht and Franck Elemba of the Democratic Republic of Congo. He went on to win another bronze medal in the Discus Throw, again behind Hogan and Tucker of South Africa.

After the Durban African Championships, he threw an outdoor PB and Nigerian Record of 20.82 m. Four days later he launched another record breaking throw of 21.27 m at the Athletics Grand Prix Usti nad Labem in Czech Republic. This was his first outdoor throw over 21 metres. He went on to better this with a 21.76 throw later in the competition. This took him up to second place in the All-Time African rankings behind Janus Robberts.

In 2016 he was selected to participate in the 2016 Summer Olympics in Rio de Jaineiro where he competed in the shot put and finished 28th overall. In addition, he has a best of 62.80 metres in the discus throw (Jacksonville 2014) which is also a Nigerian record.

== Competition record ==
Year	Competition	Venue	Position	Event	Notes
Representing the United States
2012	World Junior Championships	Barcelona, Spain	10th	Shot put (6 kg)	19.45 m
Representing Nigeria
2014	World Indoor Championships	Sopot, Poland	17th (q)	Shot put	18.91 m
2014	Commonwealth Games	Glasgow, United Kingdom	14th (q)	Shot put	17.76 m
2014	African Championships	Marrakesh, Morocco	4th	Shot put	17.65 m
2014	African Championships	Marrakesh, Morocco	3rd	Discus throw	57.11 m
2014	Continental Cup	Marrakesh, Morocco	7th	Discus throw	57.31 m^{1}
2016	World Indoor Championships	Portland, United States	12th	Shot put	19.84 m
2016	African Championships	Durban, South Africa	3rd	Shot put	19.84 m
2016	African Championships	Durban, South Africa	3rd	Discus throw	59.16 m
2016	Olympic Games	Rio de Janeiro, Brazil	28th (q)	Shot put	18.98 m
2018	Commonwealth Games	Gold Coast, Australia	7th	Discus throw	59.58 m

^{1}Representing Africa
