= 2022 African Championships in Athletics – Women's high jump =

The women's high jump event at the 2022 African Championships in Athletics was held on 9 June in Port Louis, Mauritius.

== Results ==
Rank	Athlete	Nationality	1.60	1.65	1.70	1.73	1.76	1.79	1.82	Result	Notes
1st place, gold medalist(s)	Rose Yeboah	Ghana	–	o	xo	xo	xo	xo	xxx	1.79	
2nd place, silver medalist(s)	Temitope Adeshina	Nigeria	–	o	o	o	xo	xxo	xxx	1.79	
3rd place, bronze medalist(s)	Yvonne Robson	South Africa	o	o	o	xo	xo	xxo	xxx	1.79	
4	Rhizlane Siba	Morocco	–	o	o	xo	o	xxx		1.76	
5	Erikah Seyama	Eswatini	o	o	o	o	xxx			1.73	
6	Shanese de Clerk	South Africa	–	xxo	o	o	xxx			1.73	
7	Mia Jansen van Rensburg	South Africa	o	o	xo	xo	xxx			1.73	
8	Ayten Bisher	Egypt	o	o	xo	xxx				1.70	
9	Nyajuog Mach	Ethiopia	o	xxx						1.60	
	Fatoumata Balley	Guinea								DNS	
	Kevine Kouotché	Cameroon								DNS	
	Aboubakar Tetndap Nsangou	Cameroon								DNS	
	Fatimata Zoungrana	Burkina Faso								DNS	
	Rana Mahmoud	Egypt								DNS	
	Fatima Zahra Alaoui	Morocco								DNS	
