= 2022 African Championships in Athletics – Men's discus throw =

The men's discus throw event at the 2022 African Championships in Athletics was held on 9 June in Port Louis, Mauritius.

== Results ==
Rank	Athlete	Nationality	#1	#2	#3	#4	#5	#6	Result	Notes
1st place, gold medalist(s)	Werner Visser	South Africa	x	55.27	58.81	60.42	56.96	61.80	61.80	
2nd place, silver medalist(s)	Victor Hogan	South Africa	53.11	56.81	x	57.15	58.95	53.91	58.95	
3rd place, bronze medalist(s)	Ryan Williams	Namibia	54.00	51.99	x	x	56.70	54.23	56.70	
4	Shebab Abdelaziz	Egypt	49.95	44.84	52.05	x	x	51.61	52.05	
5	Christopher Sophie	Mauritius	46.34	47.20	x	50.93	x	x	50.93	
6	Abdelmoumen Bourakba	Algeria	x	x	47.88	x	47.22	50.48	50.48	
7	Oussama Khennoussi	Algeria	30.02	x	46.65	x	x	47.58	47.58	
8	Sié Fahige Kambou	Burkina Faso	x	46.79	x	x	x	x	46.79	
9	François Prinsloo	South Africa	x	46.27	x				46.27	
	Dotun Ogundeji	Nigeria							DNS	
	Ebubechukwu Ugwoke	Nigeria							DNS	
