= 2024 African Championships in Athletics – Men's discus throw =

Men's discus throw at the 2024 African Championships in Athletics
- Venue: Japoma Stadium
- Location: Douala, Cameroon
- Dates: 23 June
- Competitors: 10 from 9 nations
- Winning distance: 63.90 m CR, NR

Medalists
gold medal	Oussama Khennoussi	Algeria
silver medal	Victor Hogan	South Africa
bronze medal	Ryan Williams	Namibia

The men's discus throw event at the 2024 African Championships in Athletics was held on 23 June in Douala, Cameroon.

== Records ==
Records before the 2024 African Athletics Championships
Record	Athlete (nation)	Distance (m)	Location	Date
World record	Mykolas Alekna (LTU)	74.35	Ramona, United States	14 April 2024
African record	Frantz Kruger (RSA)	70.32	Salon-de-Provence, France	26 May 2002
Championship record	Frantz Kruger (RSA)	63.85	Brazzaville, Republic of the Congo	14 July 2004
World leading	Mykolas Alekna (LTU)	74.35	Ramona, United States	14 April 2024
African leading	Francois Prinsloo (RSA)	67.26	Hattiesburg, United States	27 April 2024

== Results ==
Rank	Athlete	Nationality	#1	#2	#3	#4	#5	#6	Result	Notes
1st place, gold medalist(s)	Oussama Khennoussi	Algeria	59.88	60.05	x	62.34	59.30	63.90	63.90	CR, NR
2nd place, silver medalist(s)	Victor Hogan	South Africa	59.93	61.71	59.15	x	60.81	63.87	63.87	
3rd place, bronze medalist(s)	Ryan Williams	Namibia	56.78	55.13	56.10	x	x	53.75	56.78	
4	Fahige Kambou Sie	Burkina Faso	53.60	53.18	x	54.07	52.95	x	54.07	
5	Christopher Sophie	Mauritius	52.93	51.86	52.05	53.68	52.50	51.36	53.68	
6	El Bachir Mbarki	Morocco	52.65	53.47	x	50.80	50.40	52.71	53.47	
7	Rexford Bugase	Ghana	50.72	x	49.04	46.40	x	48.35	50.72	
8	Lucien Wangba	Cameroon	x	48.67	x				48.67	
9	Tewodros Bogale	Ethiopia	30.45	42.72	x				42.72	
10	Mekuria Haile	Ethiopia	39.14	41.08	39.50				41.08	
	Israel Adeshina	Nigeria							DNS	

== See also ==
- Athletics at the 2023 African Games – Men's discus throw
