= 2015 World Youth Championships in Athletics – Boys' discus throw =

Boys' discus throw at the 2015 World Youth Championships in Athletics
- Venue: Estadio Olímpico Pascual Guerrero
- Dates: 17–18 July
- Competitors: 27 from 22 nations
- Winning distance: 64.24

Medalists
gold medal	Werner Visser	South Africa
silver medal	Wang Yuhan	China
bronze medal	George Evans	Great Britain

The boys' discus throw at the 2015 World Youth Championships in Athletics was held at the Estadio Olímpico Pascual Guerrero in Cali, Colombia from 17 to 18 July 2015.

== Records ==
Prior to the competition, the following records were as follows.

World Youth Best	Mykyta Nesterenko (UKR)	77.50	Kyiv, Ukraine	19 May 2008
Championship Record	Mykyta Nesterenko (UKR)	70.67	Ostrava, Czech Republic	13 July 2007
World Youth Leading	Werner Visser (RSA)	65.30	Roodepoort, South Africa	17 January 2015

== Results ==
=== Qualification ===
With qualifying standard of 58.50 (Q) or at least the 12 best performers (q) advance to the final.

Rank	Group	Name	Nationality	1	2	3	Mark	Notes
1	A	Wictor Petersson	Sweden	53.78	64.83		64.83	Q, PB
2	B	Werner Visser	South Africa	61.93			61.93	Q
3	A	Patrick Duvenage	South Africa	56.22	59.63		59.63	Q
4	B	Henrik Janssen	Germany	55.34	x	59.10	59.10	Q, PB
5	A	Adrian Piperi	United States	57.14	55.60	58.62	58.62	Q
6	B	Gabriel Oladipo	United States	56.86	55.99	58.59	58.59	Q, PB
7	B	George Evans	Great Britain	56.46	58.53		58.53	Q
8	B	Hleb Zhuk	Belarus	58.09	x	57.09	58.09	q
9	A	Wang Yuhan	China	56.88	56.31	56.44	56.88	q
10	A	Richárd Szebegyinszki	Hungary	53.88	56.31	54.53	56.31	q
11	B	Miguel de la Caridad	Cuba	56.15	53.91	53.25	56.15	q
12	B	Mihaíl Kartsíni	Greece	53.32	53.43	55.10	55.10	q
13	A	Oskar Stachnik	Poland	54.00	53.63	55.06	55.06	
14	A	Christoforos Genethli	Cyprus	53.58	52.99	54.66	54.66	
15	A	Temuri Abulashvili	Georgia	x	54.27	x	54.27	
16	B	Georgios Koniarakis	Cyprus	54.22	51.60	x	54.22	
17	A	Alejandro Castillo	Mexico	53.86	52.04	51.51	53.86	
18	B	Szymon Mazur	Poland	53.37	x	53.60	53.60	
19	B	Giacomo Marinai	Italy	x	52.18	51.80	52.18	
20	A	Nilson Rivas	Colombia	51.48	x	x	51.48	
21	A	Ashwani Lamba	India	x	51.35	x	51.35	
22	B	Saymon Hoffmann	Brazil	x	50.81	41.97	50.81	
23	A	Victor Negara	Moldova	50.79	x	50.50	50.79	
24	A	Félix Valle	Cuba	x	x	50.27	50.27	
25	B	Ma Hau-wei	Chinese Taipei	46.94	x	x	46.94	
26	A	Denzelle To'o	Cook Islands	45.04	45.44	x	45.44	
–	B	Shehab Mohamed Abdalaziz	Egypt	x	x	x	NM	

=== Final ===
Rank	Name	Nationality	1	2	3	4	5	6	Mark	Notes
1st place, gold medalist(s)	Werner Visser	South Africa	59.03	x	64.24	x	x	x	64.24	
2nd place, silver medalist(s)	Wang Yuhan	China	60.33	x	x	x	58.61	58.84	60.33	PB
3rd place, bronze medalist(s)	George Evans	Great Britain	x	60.22	x	x	x	x	60.22	
4	Hleb Zhuk	Belarus	46.61	58.39	54.74	x	60.18	x	60.18	PB
5	Richárd Szebegyinszki	Hungary	x	50.75	59.23	x	x	x	59.23	
6	Adrian Piperi	United States	x	58.81	x	x	x	x	58.81	PB
7	Patrick Duvenage	South Africa	56.29	57.41	58.71	58.58	x	x	58.71	
8	Miguel de la Caridad	Cuba	55.24	56.45	x	55.26	55.22	x	56.45	
9	Gabriel Oladipo	United States	55.98	x	x				55.98	
10	Henrik Janssen	Germany	x	x	55.76				55.76	
11	Wictor Petersson	Sweden	x	53.02	x				53.02	
12	Mihaíl Kartsíni	Greece	x	51.24	x				51.24	
