= 2018 African Championships in Athletics – Men's discus throw =

== Results ==
| Rank | Athlete | Nationality | #1 | #2 | #3 | #4 | #5 | #6 | Result | Notes |
|---|---|---|---|---|---|---|---|---|---|---|
| 1st place, gold medalist(s) | Victor Hogan | South Africa | 58.24 | 59.18 | 59.17 | 60.06 | 59.37 | x | 60.06 | |
| 2nd place, silver medalist(s) | Werner Visser | South Africa | 50.99 | 56.95 | 55.52 | 58.22 | 53.68 | x | 58.22 | |
| 3rd place, bronze medalist(s) | Elbachir Mbarki | Morocco | 50.96 | 54.97 | x | 53.64 | 54.42 | x | 54.97 | |
| 4 | Christopher Sophie | Mauritius | 51.18 | 52.29 | 52.31 | 49.71 | x | x | 52.31 | |
| 5 | Jason van Rooyen | South Africa | 47.96 | x | 51.52 | 50.41 | x | 51.82 | 51.82 | |
| 6 | Yao Adantor | Togo | 44.69 | 46.08 | 46.46 | 45.87 | 47.20 | x | 47.20 | |
| 7 | Aly Abdelmagied | Egypt | x | 44.40 | 45.11 | 43.97 | 46.13 | 44.42 | 46.13 | |
| 8 | Lema Ketema | Ethiopia | x | 42.19 | x | 40.60 | x | x | 42.19 | |
| | Nwoye Ifeanyi | Nigeria | | | | | | | DNS | |
| | Shehab Ahmed | Egypt | | | | | | | DNS | |
