= Athletics at the 2015 African Games – Men's discus throw =

The men's discus throw event at the 2015 African Games was held on 13 September.

== Results ==
Rank	Name	Nationality	#1	#2	#3	#4	#5	#6	Result	Notes
1st place, gold medalist(s)	Russell Tucker	South Africa	59.13	53.86	58.13	60.41	59.32	59.00	60.41	
2nd place, silver medalist(s)	Essohounamondom Tchalim	Togo	52.72	51.86	x	50.88	x	42.28	52.72	NR
3rd place, bronze medalist(s)	Franck Elemba	Congo	46.87	47.62	50.30	45.42	48.22	48.18	50.30	
4	Timothée Lingani	Burkina Faso	x	47.48	47.44	x	47.54	x	47.54	NR
