= 2026 African Championships in Athletics – Men's discus throw =

Men's discus throw at the 2026 African Championships in Athletics
- Venue: Legon Sports Stadium
- Location: Accra, Ghana
- Dates: 14 May
- Competitors: 6 from 6 nations
- Winning time: 57.45

Medalists
gold medal	Ryan Williams	Namibia
silver medal	Lucien Wangba	Cameroon
bronze medal	Righardt Stander	South Africa

The men's discus throw event at the 2026 African Championships in Athletics was held on 14 May in Accra, Ghana.

== Results ==
Rank	Athlete	Nationality	#1	#2	#3	#4	#5	#6	Result	Notes
1st place, gold medalist(s)	Ryan Williams	Namibia							57.45	
2nd place, silver medalist(s)	Lucien Wangba	Cameroon							57.18	
3rd place, bronze medalist(s)	Righardt Stander	South Africa							56.13	
4	Sie Fahige Kambou	Burkina Faso							53.09	
5	Christopher Sophie	Mauritius							49.57	
6	Tewodros Bogale	Ethiopia							45.38	
