= Rose Yeboah =

Ghanaian high jumper (born 2001)

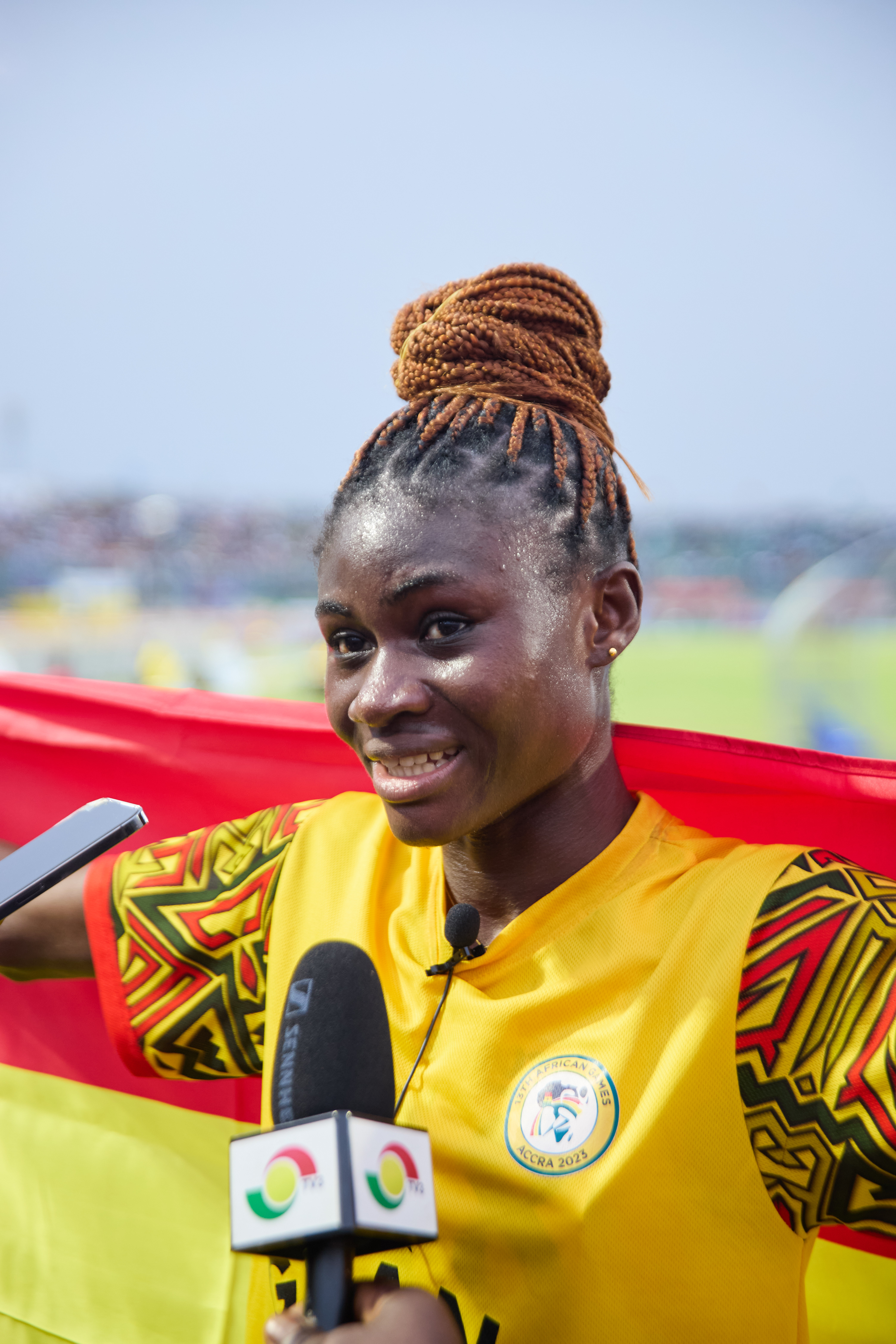
- Yeboah at the 2023 African Games

Personal information
- Full name: Rose Amoanimaa Yeboah
- Born: 23 December 2001 (age 24) Accra, Ghana

Sport
- Country: Ghana
- Sport: High jump
- Event: Women's 1.97m
- College team: University of Illinois Urbana-Champaign
- Coached by: Petros Kyprianou
Medal record
Women's athletics
Representing Ghana
African Games
Gold medal – first place	2019 Rabat	High jump
Gold medal – first place	2023 Accra	High jump
African Championships
Gold medal – first place	2022 Saint Pierre	High jump
Gold medal – first place	2024 Douala	High jump
World University Games
Gold medal – first place	2021 Chengdu	High jump
NCAA Outdoor Championship
Gold medal – first place	2024 Eugene	High jump
- Updated on 22 July 2024

Rose Amoanimaa Yeboah (born 23 December 2001) is a Ghanaian high jumper.

In 2025, she became the first Ghanaian to qualify for the final of the women's high jump at the World Athletics Championships held in Tokyo, Japan. Rose Amoanimaa Yeboah wrote her name into the history books by qualifying for the women's high jump final at the World Athletics Championships in Tokyo, becoming the first Ghanaian athlete to reach an individual final at the championships since 2005.

Yeboah first gained international experience in 2019 at the XIV African U20 Championships in Abidjan, where she won the gold medal in high jump with a height of 1.83 m. In August, she also competed at the 2019 African Games in Rabat, increasing by one centimeter, and thus also won another gold medal in the high jump event. Prior to that she represented Ghana and won gold medals at both the Ecowas U-20 Championships in Abidjan and the All-Africa University Games in Egypt.

Other sports that she plays are hockey and basketball. In high school, her team Kumasi Girls Senior High School won gold at the Spriteball Championship, where she won MVP.

== Education ==
She had her secondary education at Kumasi Girls Senior High School. After previously attending the University of Cape Coast, Yeboah joined the University of Illinois for the 2023-24 collegiate season. On 8 June 2024, Yeboah won the NCAA outdoor high jump national title with a 1.97m jump.

== Personal bests ==
- High jump: 1.83 m, April 2019 CAA U-18 and U-20 Abidjan.
- High jump: 1.84 m, 27 August 2019 in Rabat.
- High jump: 1.85 m, January 2020 GUSA Games Legon.
- High jump: 1.97m, June 2024, NCAA Championships

Olympic Games
Preceded by Carlos Mäder	Flag bearer for Ghana; Paris 2024 with Joseph Amoah	Succeeded by Incumbent
