= 2014 African Championships in Athletics – Men's discus throw =

The men's discus throw event at the 2014 African Championships in Athletics was held on August 11 on Stade de Marrakech.

== Results ==
| Rank | Athlete | Nationality | #1 | #2 | #3 | #4 | #5 | #6 | Result | Notes |
|---|---|---|---|---|---|---|---|---|---|---|
| 1st place, gold medalist(s) | Victor Hogan | South Africa | 61.18 | 60.83 | 62.87 | x | 61.29 | x | 62.87 | |
| 2nd place, silver medalist(s) | Russell Tucker | South Africa | 57.79 | x | 57.71 | 58.19 | 62.15 | 61.62 | 62.15 | |
| 3rd place, bronze medalist(s) | Stephen Mozia | Nigeria | 44.44 | 57.11 | x | x | x | x | 57.11 | |
| 4 | Ali Abdallah Khalifa | Libya | 52.52 | 52.77 | x | x | x | 53.99 | 53.99 | |
| 5 | Yasser Farag Ibrahim | Egypt | 52.12 | 52.82 | x | 52.05 | 52.57 | 52.26 | 52.82 | |
| 6 | Elvino Pierre-Louis | Mauritius | 47.47 | x | 51.08 | 49.84 | x | x | 51.08 | |
| 7 | Augustine Nwoye | Nigeria | 48.54 | x | 49.24 | x | 49.84 | 44.52 | 49.84 | |
| 8 | Mitko Tilahun | Ethiopia | 39.64 | 44.26 | 20.88 | 39.59 | x | 37.74 | 44.26 | |
| 9 | Dean William | Seychelles | 40.85 | x | 38.47 | | | | 40.85 | |
| 10 | Mohamed Ibrahim Mtwana | Tanzania | 35.15 | 40.22 | 39.37 | | | | 40.22 | |
| 11 | Juma Ali Seifi | Tanzania | 39.22 | 36.56 | 37.93 | | | | 39.22 | |
| | Mohamed Magdi Hamza | Egypt | | | | | | | DNS | |
