= Temitope Adeshina =

Nigerian high jumper (born 1998)

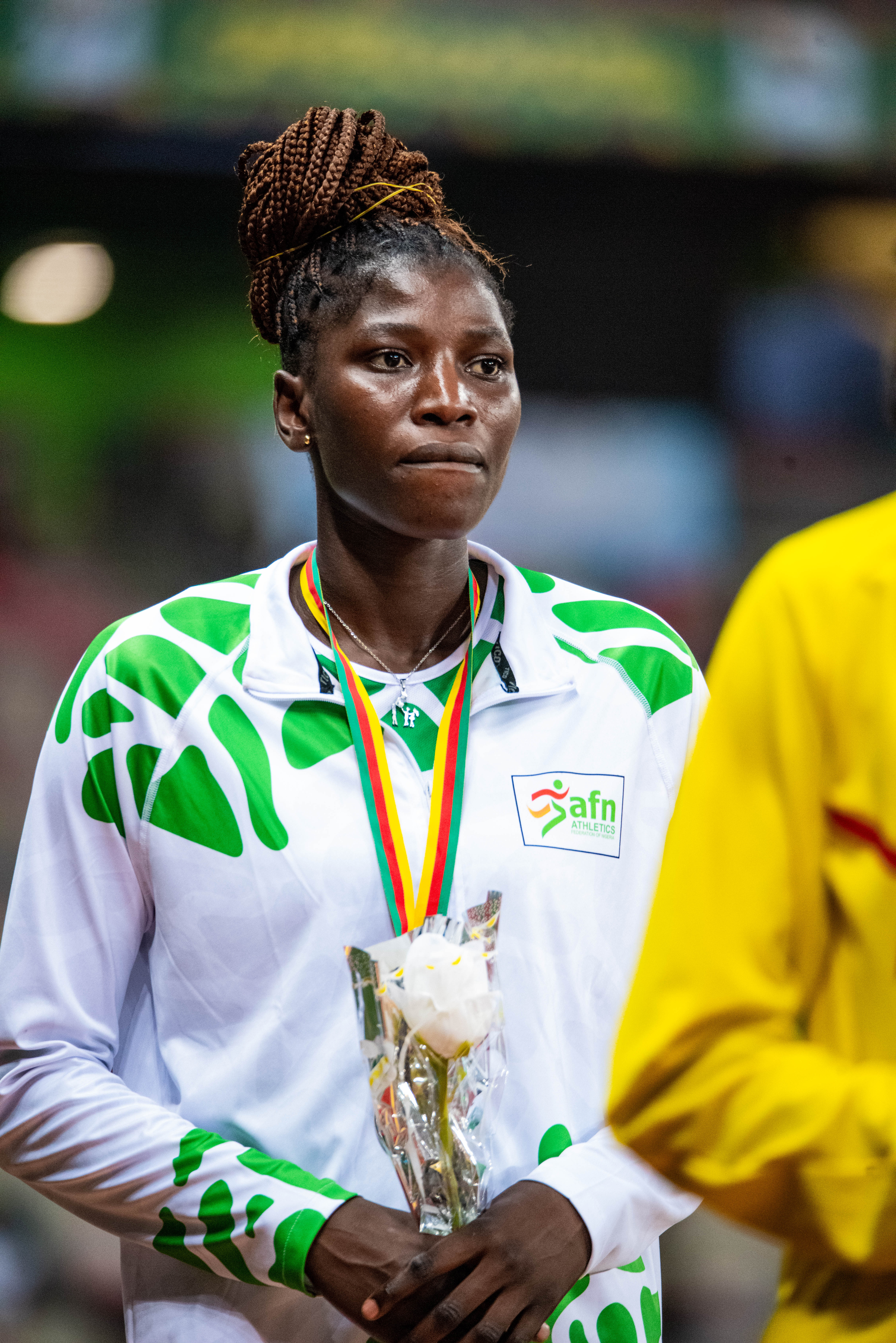

Personal information
- Nationality: Nigerian
- Born: Temitope Simbiat Adeshina; 11 November 1998 (age 27)

Sport
- Sport: Athletics
- Event: High jump

Achievements and titles
- Personal bests: High jump: 1.97m (Eugene, 2024) NR
Medal record
Women's athletics
Representing Nigeria
African Championships
Silver medal – second place	2022 Saint Pierre	High jump
Silver medal – second place	2024 Douala	High jump
Commonwealth Games
Bronze medal – third place	2026 Glasgow	High jump

Temitope Simbiat Adeshina (born 11 November 1998) is a Nigerian high jumper. In 2024, she broke the national record in the high jump.

== Biography ==
In June 2022, she won the silver medal in the high jump at the 2022 African Athletics Championships in St Pierre, Mauritius. She won the Nigerian championship high jump title in 2022. She retained her Nigerian championship title in 2023.

She joined Texas Tech University in 2023, and competing indoors in early 2024 jumped a personal best and national record height of 1.96 metres in Texas. At the NCAA Championship in Eugene on 8 June 2024 she jumped a personal best, and national record, 1.97 metres to meet the Olympic 2024 qualifying standard. She competed in the high jump at the 2024 Paris Olympics.

She tied for victory in the high jump at the 2025 NCAA Indoor Championships in Virginia Beach on 15 March, along with Elena Kulichenko. She was selected for the 2025 World Athletics Indoor Championships in Nanjing in March 2025 but did not compete. She set a meet record of 1.97 metres to win the high jump at the Big 12 Conference finals in May 2025.

Competing at the Razorback International on 31 January 2026, she equalled her personal best of 1.97 metres, the third consecutive season she attained the height. The following month, she tied Vashti Cunningham's facility record and set a new meet record of 1.96m in winning the Big 12 Indoor Championship. In March, she won the 2026 NCAA Division I Indoor Track and Field Championships. In May, Adesina cleared 1.94 meters to win the high jump by almost 10 centimetres at the Big 12 Outdoor Championships. On 13 June, she cleared 1.96 meters to win the 2026 NCAA Outdoor Championships. On 28 July, she won the bronze medal at the 2026 Commonwealth Games in Glasgow, Scotland, clearing 1.90m in wet conditions.
