= 2012 African Championships in Athletics – Men's discus throw =

The men's discus throw at the 2012 African Championships in Athletics was held at the Stade Charles de Gaulle on June 29.

== Medalists ==
Gold	Victor Hogan; South Africa
Silver	Yasser Ibrahim Farag; Egypt
Bronze	Russel Tucker; South Africa

== Records ==
Standing records prior to the 2012 African Championships in Athletics
World record	Jürgen Schult (GDR)	74.08	Neubrandenburg, East Germany	6 June 1986
African record	Frantz Kruger (RSA)	70.32	Salon-de-Provence, France	26 May 2002
Championship record	Frantz Kruger (RSA)	63.85	Brazzaville, Republic of the Congo	14 July 2004

== Schedule ==
Date	Time	Round
29 June 2012	15:05	Final

== Results ==
=== Final ===
Rank	Athlete	Nationality	#1	#2	#3	#5	#5	#6	Result	Notes
1st place, gold medalist(s)	Victor Hogan	South Africa	58.76	x	60.89	61.80	x	x	61.80	
2nd place, silver medalist(s)	Yasser Ibrahim Farag	Egypt	57.30	53.03	x	57.47	x	59.61	59.61	
3rd place, bronze medalist(s)	Russel Tucker	South Africa	57.99	55.80	x	57.76	x	x	57.99	
4	Ali Jlela Ali	Libya	55.84	x	x	x	x	49.36	55.84	
5	Donovan Snyman	South Africa	54.55	51.52	52.47	x	54.95	x	54.95	
6	Elvino Pierre-Louis	Mauritius	54.55	44.68	42.80	x	49.02	48.49	54.55	NR
7	Xavio Timchou Tallam	Cameroon	x	41.06	x	40.26	51.04	x	51.04	
8	Essohounamondom Tchalim	Togo	46.06	45.74	39.42	39.66	x	x	46.06	
9	Romainio Houndeladji	Benin	x	x	35.28				35.28	
10	Romuald Agbahoungba	Benin	x	x	34.17				34.17	
	Omar Ahmed El Ghazaly	Egypt							DNS	
	Mitku Tilanhun	Ethiopia							DNS	
