= Athletics at the 2011 All-Africa Games – Men's discus throw =

The men's discus throw event at the 2011 All-Africa Games took place on 11 September at the Estádio Nacional do Zimpeto.

== Medalists ==
Gold	Yasser Ibrahim Farag (EGY)
Silver	Victor Hogan (RSA)
Bronze	Russell Tucker (RSA)

== Records ==
Prior to this competition, the existing world, African record and world leading were as follows:

World record	Jürgen Schult (GDR)	74.08	Neubrandenburg, East Germany	6 June 1986
World leading	Zoltán Kővágó (HUN)	69.50	Budapest, Hungary	30 July 2011
African record	Frantz Kruger (RSA)	70.32	Salon-de-Provence, France	26 May 2002

== Results ==
Rank	Athlete	Nationality	1	2	3	4	5	6	Result	Notes
1st place, gold medalist(s)	Yasser Ibrahim Farag	Egypt	63.20	X	63.20	X	59.82	X	63.20m	
2nd place, silver medalist(s)	Victor Hogan	South Africa	62.60	X	X	60.74	X	X	62.60m	
3rd place, bronze medalist(s)	Russell Tucker	South Africa	X	54.00	51.54	55.98	54.27	X	55.98m	
4	Abderrahmane Bourakba	Algeria	X	X	X	52.47	X	X	52.47m	
5	Elvino Pierre Louis	Mauritius	X	43.83	47.86	51.89	X	49.77	51.89m	
6	Ezeofo Kenechukukwa	Nigeria	50.92	50.34	X	X	X	50.54	50.92m	
7	Siegfried Luccioni Mve	Gabon	48.55	46.53	46.36	45.33	46.97	45.78	48.55m	NR
