= 2025 Arab Athletics Championships =

24th Arab Athletics Championships
- Dates: 30 April – 4 May
- Host city: Oran, Algeria
- Venue: Miloud Hadefi Stadium
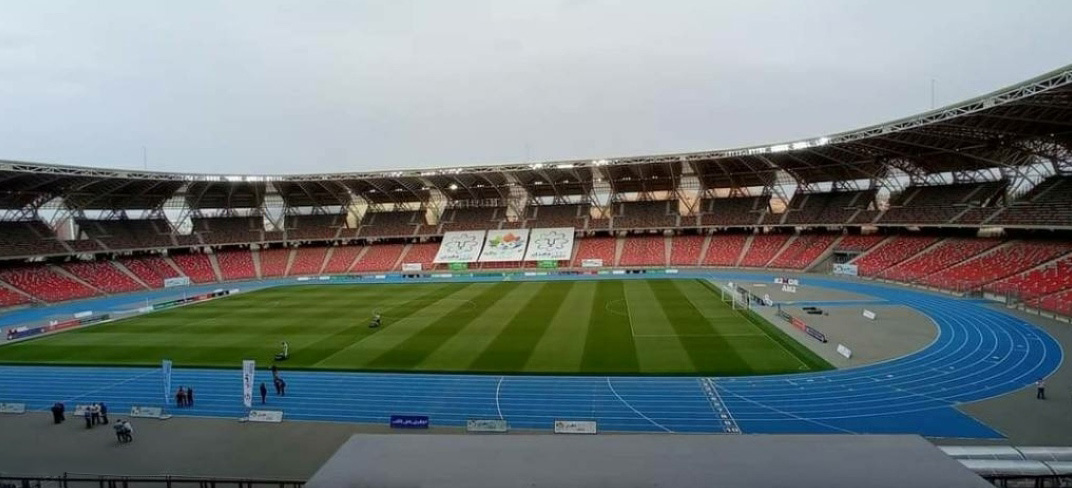
- Events: 23
- Participation: 224 athletes from 12 nations

The 2025 Arab Athletics Championships (Arabic: البطولة العربية لألعاب القوى 2025) was the 24th edition of the international athletics competition between Arab countries that took place from 30 April to 4 May 2025 at Miloud Hadefi Stadium in Oran.

== Medal summary ==
=== Men ===
Event	Gold		Silver		Bronze	
100 metres (wind: +0.2 m/s)	Abdelaziz Atafi (KSA)	10.21	Ali Anwar Al-Balushi (OMN)	10.27	Malham Al-Balushi (OMN)	10.36
200 metres (wind: +1.8 m/s)	Abdelaziz Atafi (KSA)	20.32 CR	Ali Anwar Al-Balushi (OMN)	20.67	Adem Abdelkader Benyache (ALG)	20.83
400 metres	Mazen Al-Yasen (KSA)	46.09	Abdennour Bendjemaa (ALG)	46.18	Ibrahim Fatini (KSA)	47.03
800 metres	Heithem Chenitef (ALG)	1:50.83	Abdessalem Ayouni (TUN)	1:51.13	Abdourahman Ibrahim Djama (DJI)	1:51.27
1500 metres	Mohamed Amine Drabli (ALG)	4:11.55	Zakaria Ramdani (ALG)	4:11.74	Abdessalem Ayouni (TUN)	4:11.85
5000 metres	Ramdan Ouarghi (ALG)	14:23.76	Zakarya Boudjelthia (ALG)	14:23.90	Ahmed Daher Ismail (DJI)	14:24.26
10.000 metres	Hani Idriss Hersi (DJI)	28:35.54	Youcef Addouche (ALG)	28:39.61	Abdoulfatah Daher Awaleh (DJI)	29:01.94
Half marathon	Aden Waberi Darar (DJI)	1:03:28	El Hadi Laameche (ALG)	1:04:40	Hassan Waiss Rayaleh (DJI)	1:05:02
110 metres hurdles (wind -0.2 m/s)	Yousuf Badawy Sayed (EGY)	13.48	Oumar Doudai Abakar (QAT)	13.78	Amine Bouanani (ALG)	14.02
400 metres hurdles	Abderrahman Samba (QAT)	48.77 CR	Marc Anthony Ibrahim (LBN)	50.07	Saber Boukemouche (ALG)	50.16
3000 metres steeplechase	Bilal Tabti (ALG)	8:22.82	Hicham Bouchicha (ALG)	8:28.05	Salem Mohamed Attiaallah (EGY)	8:31.85
4 × 100 metres relay	Algeria; Skander Djamil Athmani; Hachmi Benchada; Mohamed Abderrahmane Zadi; Adem Abdelkader Benyache	40.04	Saudi Arabia; Unknown; Unknown; Unknown; Abdelaziz Atafi	40.31	Not awarded	
4 × 400 metres relay	Algeria; Unknown; Unknown; Unknown; Izzedine Raouti	3:04.96	Saudi Arabia; Baqer Al-Jumah; Mohammed Dawood Abdullah; Abdelaziz Atafi; Abdulaziz Al-Jadani	3:13.75	Lebanon; Noureddine Hadid; Ali Mortada; Mohammed Hannouf; Marc Anthony Ibrahim	3:23.29
20 kilometres walk	Abdennour Ameur (ALG)	1:24:27	Islam Abdeltawab Belal (EGY)	1:25:10	Souhail Abderrahmane Aloui (ALG)	1:27:35
High jump	Hamdi Ali (QAT)	2.14 m	Fatak Bait Jaboob (OMN)	2.14 m	Hichem Bouhanoun (ALG)	2.12 m
Pole vault	Seifeldin Abdelsalam (QAT)	5.62 m CR	Hussain Al-Hizam (KSA)	5.45 m	Medhi-Amar Rouana (ALG)	5.20 m
Long jump	Tarek Hocine (ALG)	7.48 m	Louai Lamraoui (ALG)	7.41 m	Zeyad El-Hussein (EGY)	7.24 m
Triple jump	Yasser Triki (ALG)	16.84 m	Sami Bakheet (KSA)	16.14 m	Hassan Dawshi (KSA)	16.08 m
Shot put	Mohammed Tolo (KSA)	19.70 m	Djibrine Adoum Ahmat (QAT)	17.88 m	Mohamed Abdelhamid Sirine (ALG)	16.68 m
Discus throw	Oussama Khennoussi (ALG)	64.54 m (Note: by World Athletics source; 62.69 m by other sources) NR	Essa Al-Zenkawi (KUW)	59.72 m	Mohamed Ibrahim Moaaz (QAT)	58.67 m
Hammer throw	Ashraf Amgad El Seify (QAT)	72.98 m	Mohammed Al-Dubaisi (KSA)	69.42 m	Ismail Tarek Ahmed (EGY)	69.39 m
Javelin throw	Ali Essa Abdulghani (KSA)	70.93 m	Haithem Arafat Ben Aoulai (ALG)	62.37 m	Saqer Rabeh Ali Abdulghani (LBY)	56.95 m
Decathlon	Dhiae Boudoumi (ALG)	7501 pts	Mohsen Hassan Al-Dabbous (KSA)	6937 pts	Saeed Mubarak (KSA)	6904 pts

=== Women ===
Event	Gold		Silver		Bronze	
100 metres (wind: +0,1 m/s)	Bassant Hemida (EGY)	11.52	Maram Regal (EGY)	11.71	Aziza Sbaity (LBN)	11.95
200 metres (wind: ...)	Bassant Hemida (EGY)	23.81	Maram Regal (EGY)	23.95	Manel Benkaci (ALG)	24.38
400 metres	Ines Belgacem (TUN)	55.35	Chaima Benali (ALG)	55.77	Siham Amedjkouh (ALG)	59.51
800 metres	Nesrine Abed (ALG)	2:05.98	Marwa Bouzayani (TUN)	2:06.18	Ghania Rezzik (ALG)	2:09.73
1500 metres	Marwa Bouzayani (TUN)	4:24.37	Abir Reffas (ALG)	4:14.10	Rihab Dhahri (TUN)	4:15.13
5000 metres	Kadra Mohamed Dembil (DJI)	15:52.76	Habon Ahmed Djama (DJI)	15:59.36	Abir Reffas (ALG)	16:16.62
100 metres hurdles (wind: +0,2 m/s)	Rahil Hamel (ALG)	13.92	Manel Benkaci (ALG)	14.25	Maryam Al-Matar (KSA)	19.12
400 metres hurdles	Chaima Ouanis (ALG)	1:01.05	Nourhane Hermi (TUN)	1:01.46	Sarah Houma (ALG)	1:03.38
3000 metres steeplechase	Rihab Dhahri (TUN)	9:50.44	Nassima Smail (ALG)	10:20.54	Nour Meriem Gamane (ALG)	10:50.88
4 × 100 metres relay	Algeria; Siham Amedjkouh; Lina Maria Guedal; Safaa Nesrine Troubia; Manel Benkaci	47.18	Egypt; Dina El Tabaa; Esraa Owis; Maram Regal; Bassant Hemida	47.89	Saudi Arabia; Sarah El Hilal; Hiba Malm; Hibah Mohammed; Lujain Al Humaid	49.24
4 × 400 metres relay	Algeria; Unknown; Unknown; Unknown; Unknown	3:47.12	Tunisia; Unknown; Unknown; Unknown; Unknown	4:00.55	Not awarded	
10000 m walk	Imen Saii (TUN)	45:39.55 CR	Souad Azzi (ALG)	46:04.07	Melissa Touloum (ALG)	47:38.97
High jump	Darina Hadil Rezik (ALG)	1.75 m	Bishir Ayten Ahmed (EGY)	1.73 m	Aliya Al Mughairi (OMN)	1.71 m NR
Pole vault	Dora Mahfoudhi (TUN)	3.85 m	Dina El Tabaa (EGY)	3.70 m	Maryam Srasra (TUN)	3.20 m
Long jump	Esraa Owis (EGY)	6.48 m	Wissal Harkas (ALG)	5.65 m	Leticia Ouaba (ALG)	5.61 m
Triple jump	Esraa Owis (EGY)	13.58 m	Wissal Harkas (ALG)	12.79 m	Leticia Ouaba (ALG)	12.36 m
Shot put	Nada Chroudi (TUN)	14.72 m	Marihan Mohamed Ahmed (EGY)	13.76 m	Ghofrane Lahmedi (TUN)	13.25 m
Discus throw	Retag Asaiah (LBY)	51.09 m	Ghofrane Lahmadi (TUN)	47.85 m	Chaima Chouikh (TUN)	46.85 m
Hammer throw	Zahra Tatar (ALG)	64.72 m	Rawan Ayman Ibrahim Barakat (EGY)	64.35 m	Zouina Bouzebra (ALG)	60.60 m
Javelin throw	Sherine Shaaban Ahmed (EGY)	51.70 m	Ouidad Yesli (ALG)	45.04 m	Islem kthiri (TUN)	35.68 m
Heptathlon	Nada Chroudi (TUN)	5354 pts	Islam Kthiri (TUN)	4781 pts	Aya Zitouni (ALG)	4734 pts

== Medal table ==
Key

The host country is highlighted in lavender blue

Rank	Nation	Gold	Silver	Bronze	Total
1	Algeria*	18	17	18	53
2	Tunisia	7	6	6	19
3	Egypt	6	7	3	16
4	Saudi Arabia	5	6	5	16
5	Qatar	4	2	1	7
6	Djibouti	3	1	4	8
7	Libya	1	0	1	2
8	Oman	0	3	2	5
9	Lebanon	0	1	2	3
10	Kuwait	0	1	0	1
Totals (10 entries)		44	44	42	130

== Participating nations ==
- Algeria (63)
- Djibouti (...)
- Egypt (15)
- Jordan (...)
- Kuwait (...)
- Lebanon (...)
- Libya (...)
- Oman (...)
- Palestine (...)
- Qatar (...)
- Saudi Arabia (...)
- Tunisia (18)

== Broadcasting ==
The Algerian Public Establishment of Television (EPTV) is the owner of the broadcasting rights of the championships.

Territory	Broadcaster	Ref
Algeria	Algerian TV6 (official broadcaster)	
Algeria	Algerian TV2 (official broadcaster)	
