= Athletics at the 2023 African Games – Men's discus throw =

Men's discus throw at the 2023 African Games
- Location: Accra, Ghana
- Dates: 18 March
- Competitors: 9 from 8 nations
- Winning distance: 62.56 m

Medalists
gold medal	Victor Hogan	South Africa
silver medal	Oussama Khennoussi	Algeria
bronze medal	Ryan Williams	Namibia

The men's discus throw event at the 2023 African Games was held on 18 March 2024 in Accra, Ghana.

== Results ==
Held on 18 March

Rank	Name	Nationality	#1	#2	#3	#4	#5	#6	Result	Notes
1st place, gold medalist(s)	Victor Hogan	South Africa	57.27	x	59.00	59.31	60.09	62.56	62.56	
2nd place, silver medalist(s)	Oussama Khennoussi	Algeria	53.89	53.85	58.80	57.41	59.97	58.67	59.97	
3rd place, bronze medalist(s)	Ryan Williams	Namibia	52.54	51.26	50.81	55.42	x	x	55.42	
4	Christopher Sophie	Mauritius	48.62	51.94	52.30	52.98	x	x	52.98	
5	Sié Fahige Kambou	Burkina Faso	51.04	x	x	x	49.78	x	51.04	
6	Bugase Rexford	Ghana	37.73	50.77	x	44.44	50.49	x	50.77	
7	Essohounamondom Tchalim	Togo	x	41.46	43.47	49.06	46.71	44.82	49.06	
8	Gebeyehu Gebreyesus	Ethiopia	41.51	42.77	43.72	43.05	42.86	43.77	43.77	
9	Tewodros Bogale	Ethiopia	x	42.02	x				42.02	
