= 2016 African Championships in Athletics – Men's discus throw =

The men's discus throw event at the 2016 African Championships in Athletics was held on 23 June in Kings Park Stadium.

== Results ==
Rank	Athlete	Nationality	Result	Notes
1st place, gold medalist(s)	Russell Tucker	South Africa	61.44	
2nd place, silver medalist(s)	Stephen Mozia	Nigeria	59.16	
3rd place, bronze medalist(s)	Dewaald Van Heerden	South Africa	58.44	
4	Mouaz Elsergany	Egypt	50.13	
5	Luccioni Mve	Gabon	DNS	
	Franck Elemba	Congo	DNS	
