= Russell Tucker =

South African discus thrower

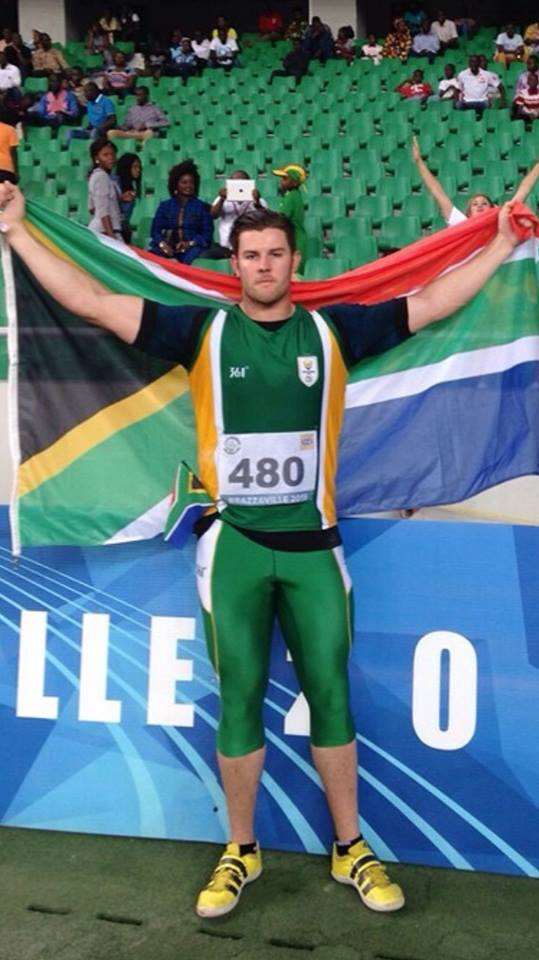
- The Tank winning Gold at All African Games 2015

Personal information
- Nickname: Russ
- Nationality: South African
- Born: 11 April 1990 (age 36) Barberton, South Africa
- Education: Monash University
- Height: 1.96 m (6.4 ft)
- Weight: 120 kg (260 lb)

Sport
- Sport: Track and field
- Event: Discus throw
Medal record
Men's athletics
Representing South Africa
All-Africa Games
Gold medal – first place	2015 Brazzaville	Discus throw
Bronze medal – third place	2011 Maputo	Discus throw
African Championships
Gold medal – first place	2016 Durban	Discus throw
Silver medal – second place	2014 Marrakesh	Discus throw
Bronze medal – third place	2012 Porto-Novo	Discus throw

Russell Wayne George Tucker (born 11 April 1990) is a South African athlete specialising in the discus throw. He won several medals on continental level including the gold at the 2015 African Games as well as gold medal in 2016 African games and silver at the 2014 African Championships.

His personal best in the event is 64.24 metres set in Pretoria in 2016.

Due to Injury, Russell Tucker Retired from Discus in May 2016.

== Competition record ==
Year	Competition	Venue	Position	Event	Notes
Representing South Africa
2011	All-Africa Games	Maputo, Mozambique	3rd	Discus throw	55.98 m
2012	African Championships	Porto-Novo, Benin	3rd	Discus throw	57.99 m
2014	African Championships	Marrakesh, Morocco	2nd	Discus throw	62.15 m
2015	Universiade	Gwangju, South Korea	7th	Discus throw	57.31 m
2015	African Games	Brazzaville, Republic of the Congo	1st	Discus throw	60.41 m
2016	African Championships	Durban, South Africa	1st	Discus throw	61.44 m

== Progression ==
- 2012 – 58.84
- 2013 – 59.27
- 2014 – 62.15
- 2015 – 62.74
- 2016 – 64.24
