= Darina Hadil Rezik =

Algerian high jumper (born 2003)

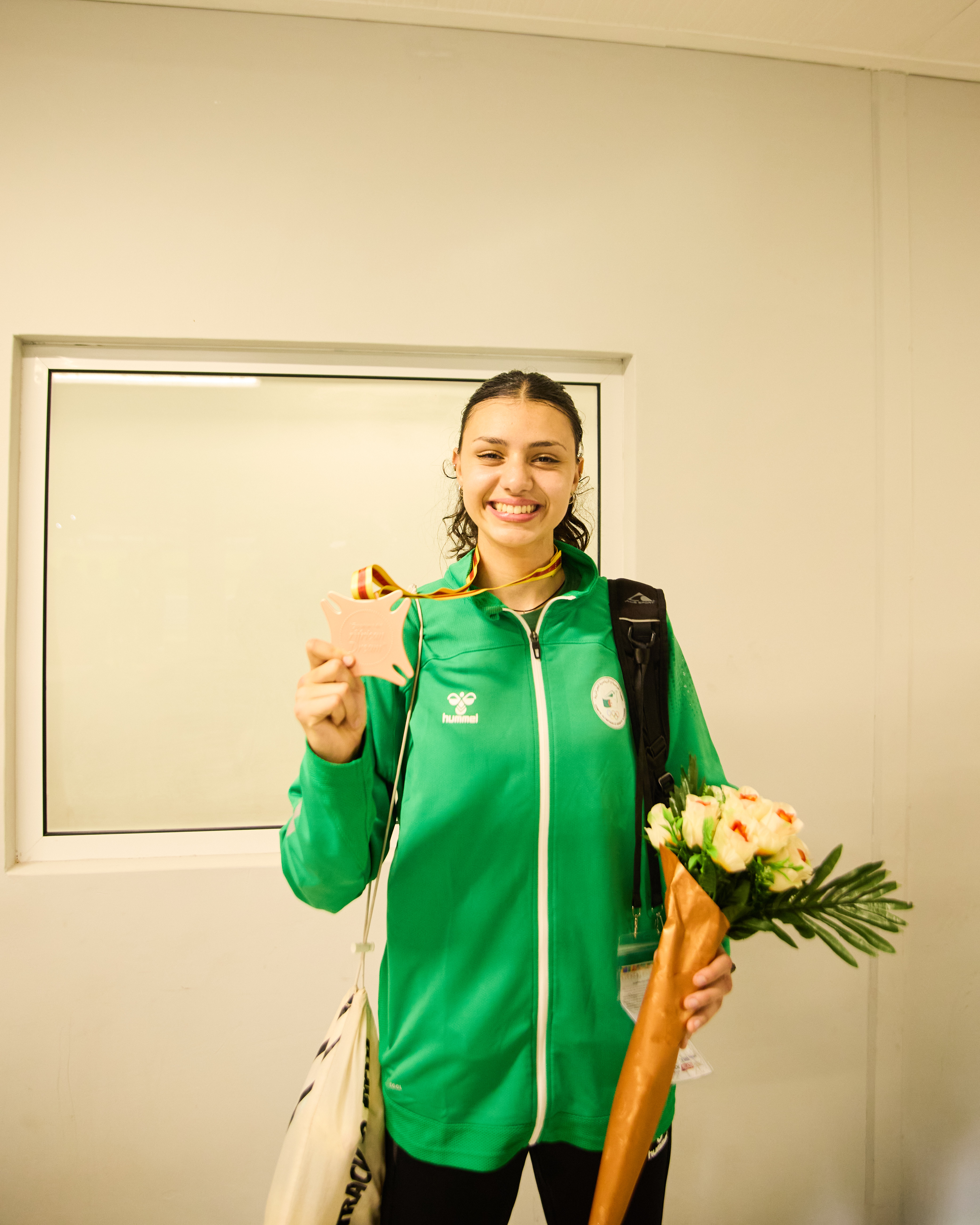
- Rezik in 2024

Personal information
- Born: 27 June 2003 (age 23)

Sport
- Sport: Athletics
- Event: High jump

Achievements and titles
- Personal best: High jump: 1.83m (2026)
Medal record
Women's athletics
Representing Algeria
African Games
Bronze medal – third place	2023 Accra	High jump
Arab Championships
Gold medal – first place	2025 Oran	High jump
Pan Arab Games
Gold medal – first place	2023 Oran	High jump

Darina Hadil Rezik (born 27 June 2003) is an Algerian high jumper. She won the bronze medal at the 2023 African Games.

== Biography ==
Rezik won the gold medal in the high jump competition at the 2023 Arab Games in Oran, with a jump of 1.77 metres. Rezik won the bronze medal in the high jump at the delayed 2023 African Games in Accra, Ghana, with a jump of 1.78 m in March 2024.

Rezik won the high jump competition at the 2025 Arab Athletics Championships in Oran on 1 May 2025. She cleared 1.80 metres to win the Meeting Regional du CAC in Caen, France, on 28 June 2025. In March 2026, she jumped a new personal best of 1.83 metres at the Algerian Winter Championshihps in Algiers.
