= Werner Visser =

South African discus thrower

Personal information
- Born: 27 February 1998 (age 28)

Sport
- Country: South Africa
- Sport: Athletics
- Event: Discus throw
Medal record
Men's athletics
Representing South Africa
African Championships
| Gold medal – first place | 2022 Mauritius | Discus throw |
| Silver medal – second place | 2018 Asaba | Discus throw |

Werner Jakobus Visser (born 27 February 1998) is a South African male discus thrower, who won a gold medal at the 2015 World Youth Championships in Cali. At senior level, he won his first medal, a silver, at the 2018 African Championships in Asaba.

== Achievements ==
All information taken from World Athletics profile.

=== International competitions ===
| Year | Competition | Venue | Position | Event | Notes |
Representing South Africa
| 2015 | African Youth Championships | Reduit, Mauritius | 1st | Discus throw (1.5 kg) | 64.88 m |
| 2015 | World Youth Championships | Cali, Colombia | 1st | Discus throw (1.5 kg) | 64.24 m |
| 2015 | Commonwealth Youth Games | Apia, Samoa | 2nd | Shot put (5 kg) | 19.78 m |
| 2015 | Commonwealth Youth Games | Apia, Samoa | 1st | Discus throw (1.5 kg) | 60.94 m |
| 2017 | African U20 Championships | Tlemcen, Algeria | 2nd | Discus throw (1.75 kg) | 58.70 m |
| 2018 | African Championships | Asaba, Nigeria | 2nd | Discus throw | 58.22 m |
| 2019 | Universiade | Naples, Italy | 10th | Discus throw | 57.97 m |
| 2022 | African Championships | Saint Pierre, Mauritius | 1st | Discus throw | 61.80 m |
| 2022 | World Championships | Eugene, United States | 27th (q) | Discus throw | 58.44 m |

=== National titles ===
- USSA Championships
  - Discus throw: 2018, 2019, 2022
- South African U20 Championships
  - Discus throw: 2017
