= Victor Hogan =

South African discus thrower (born 1989)

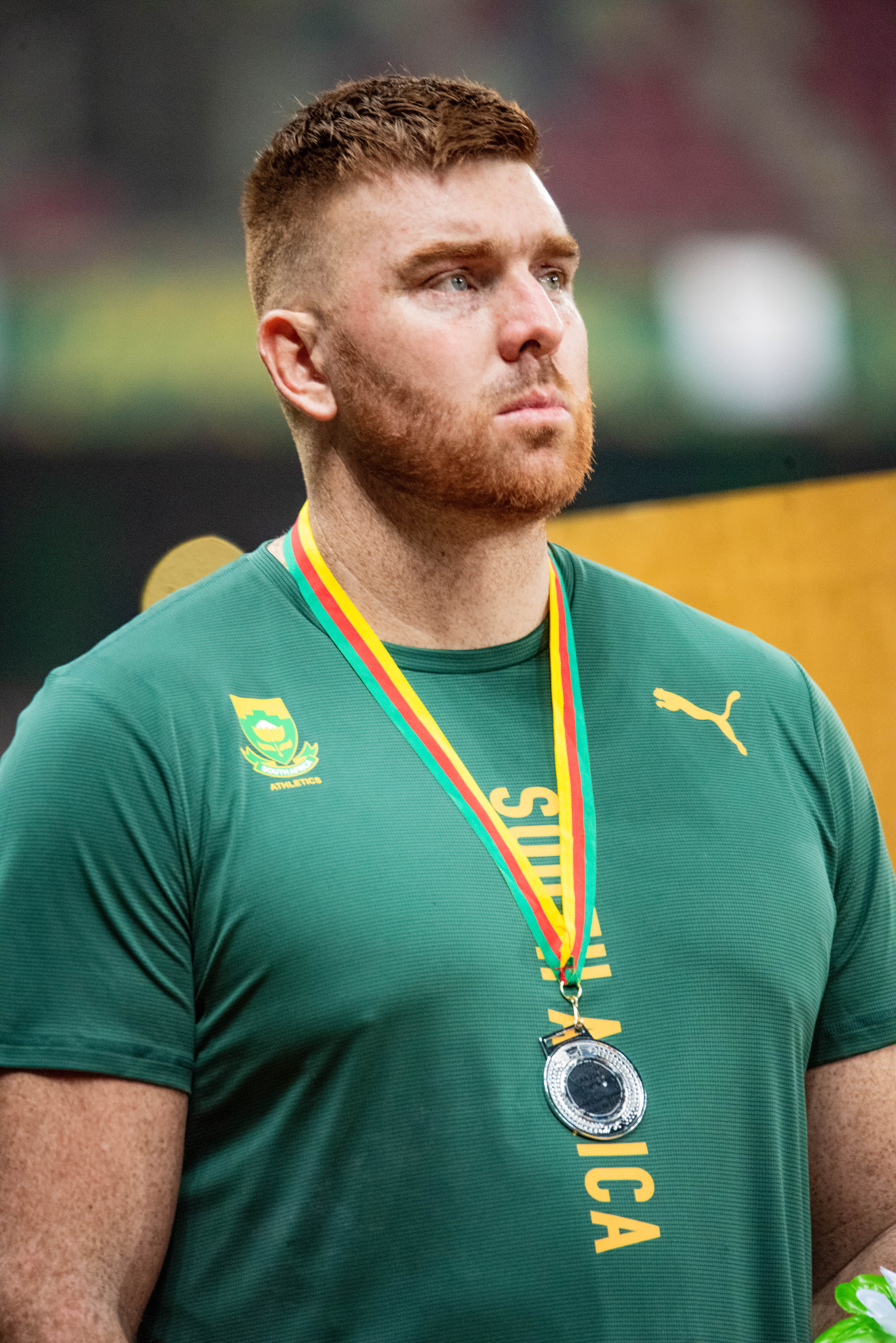
- Victor Hogan in 2024

Personal information
- Born: 25 July 1989 (age 37) Vredenburg, South Africa
Medal record
Men's athletics
Representing South Africa
African Games
Gold medal – first place	2023 Accra	Discus throw
Silver medal – second place	2011 Maputo	Discus throw
African Championships
Gold medal – first place	2012 Porto-Novo	Discus throw
Gold medal – first place	2014 Marrakesh	Discus throw
Gold medal – first place	2018 Asaba	Discus throw
Silver medal – second place	2022 Mauritius	Discus throw
Silver medal – second place	2024 Douala	Discus throw
Bronze medal – third place	2010 Nairobi	Discus throw

Victor Hogan (born 25 July 1989) is a South African discus thrower. He threw his personal best of 67.62 m (221.9 ft) at the 2016 South African track and field championship in Stellenbosch, making him a ten-time South African Champion and three-time African Champion.

== Early life ==
Hogan was born in Vredenburg on 25 June 1989 and competed in discus competitions from a young age.

== Career ==
Hogan made his junior professional debut at the 2006 Gymnasiade. He went on to win the 2007 African Junior Athletics Championships and place fourth in the 2008 World Junior Championships in Athletics. His personal best throw of 65.52 m (215.0 ft) with a junior discus in 2008 ranked him as the fifth best junior ever at the time.

He debuted on the senior circuit in 2010 with three wins on the Yellow Pages Series and his first national title. He earned bronze at the 2010 African Championships in Athletics and placed eighth at the 2010 IAAF Continental Cup. Hogan won a second South African title in 2011, following an incident where his discus struck an official on the field.

In 2011, he cleared 60 m (200 ft) for the first time and was the runner-up at the 2011 All-Africa Games with a throw of 62.6 m (205 ft). In June 2012, in Bilbao, he threw a new best of 62.76 m (205.9 ft) and earned gold at the 2012 African Championships the following month. He did not qualify for the 2012 South African Olympic team because he did not achieve the qualifying standard of 63 m (207 ft).

He earned gold at the 2014 African Championships with a distance of 62.87 m (206.3 ft).

In 2016, Hogan threw a new personal best of 67.62 m (221.9 ft), the furthest distance ever thrown at a South African championship, which qualified him for the 2016 Summer Olympics in Rio de Janeiro. He earned bronze at the Doha Diamond League with a distance of 65.59 m (215.2 ft), silver at the Rome Diamond League with a distance of 64.04 m (210.1 ft), and gold at the African Championships with a distance of 61.68 m (202.4 ft), making him a three-time African champion.

== Competition record ==
Year	Competition	Venue	Position	Event	Notes
Representing South Africa
2007	African Junior Championships	Ouagadougou, Burkina Faso	1st	Discus throw (1.75 kg)	56.35 m
2008	World Junior Championships	Bydgoszcz, Poland	4th	Discus throw (1.75 kg)	60.64 m
2010	African Championships	Nairobi, Kenya	3rd	Discus throw	58.11 m
2011	All-Africa Games	Maputo, Mozambique	2nd	Discus throw	62.60 m
2012	African Championships	Porto-Novo, Benin	1st	Discus throw	61.80 m
2013	World Championships	Moscow, Russia	5th	Discus throw	64.35 m
2014	Commonwealth Games	Glasgow, United Kingdom	10th	Discus throw	56.42 m
2014	African Championships	Marrakesh, Morocco	1st	Discus throw	62.87 m
2015	World Championships	Beijing, China	13th (q)	Discus throw	62.41 m
2016	African Championships	Durban, South Africa	DQ	Discus throw	—
2017	World Championships	London, United Kingdom	18th (q)	Discus throw	62.26 m
2018	African Championships	Asaba, Nigeria	1st	Discus throw	60.06 m
2022	African Championships	Saint Pierre, Mauritius	2nd	Discus throw	58.95 m
2022	World Championships	Eugene, United States	24th (q)	Discus throw	60.51 m
2023	World Championships	Budapest, Hungary	27th (q)	Discus throw	61.80 m
2024	African Games	Accra, Ghana	1st	Discus throw	62.56 m
2024	African Championships	Douala, Cameroon	2nd	Discus throw	63.87 m
2024	Olympic Games	Paris, France	27th (q)	Discus throw	60.78 m
