= Athletics at the 2023 African Games – Women's high jump =

The women's high jump event at the 2023 African Games was held on 19 March 2024 in Accra, Ghana.

== Medalists ==
Gold	Silver	Bronze
Rose Amoanimaa Yeboah; Ghana	Fatoumata Balley; Guinea	Darina Hadil Rezik; Algeria

== Results ==
Held on 19 March

Rank	Name	Nationality	1.55	1.60	1.65	1.70	1.75	1.78	1.81	1.84	1.87	1.90	1.94	Result	Notes
1st place, gold medalist(s)	Rose Amoanimaa Yeboah	Ghana	–	–	–	o	o	–	o	o	xo	o	xxx	1.90	
2nd place, silver medalist(s)	Fatoumata Balley	Guinea	–	–	–	o	o	o	xo	xxx				1.81	
3rd place, bronze medalist(s)	Darina Hadil Rezik	Algeria	–	–	–	o	xo	xo	xxx					1.78	
4	Ewa Peace	Nigeria	–	o	o	xxo	xo	xxx						1.75	
5	Zeddy Chongwo	Kenya	–	–	–	o	xxx							1.70	
6	Betselot Kibret	Ethiopia	–	xo	xo	xxx								1.65	
7	Esther Obenewaa	Ghana	–	o	xxo	xxx								1.65	
8	Chrislene Klein	Namibia	o	o	xxx									1.60	
	Rhizlane Siba	Morocco												DNS	
