= Fatoumata Balley =

Guinean high jumper (born 1997)

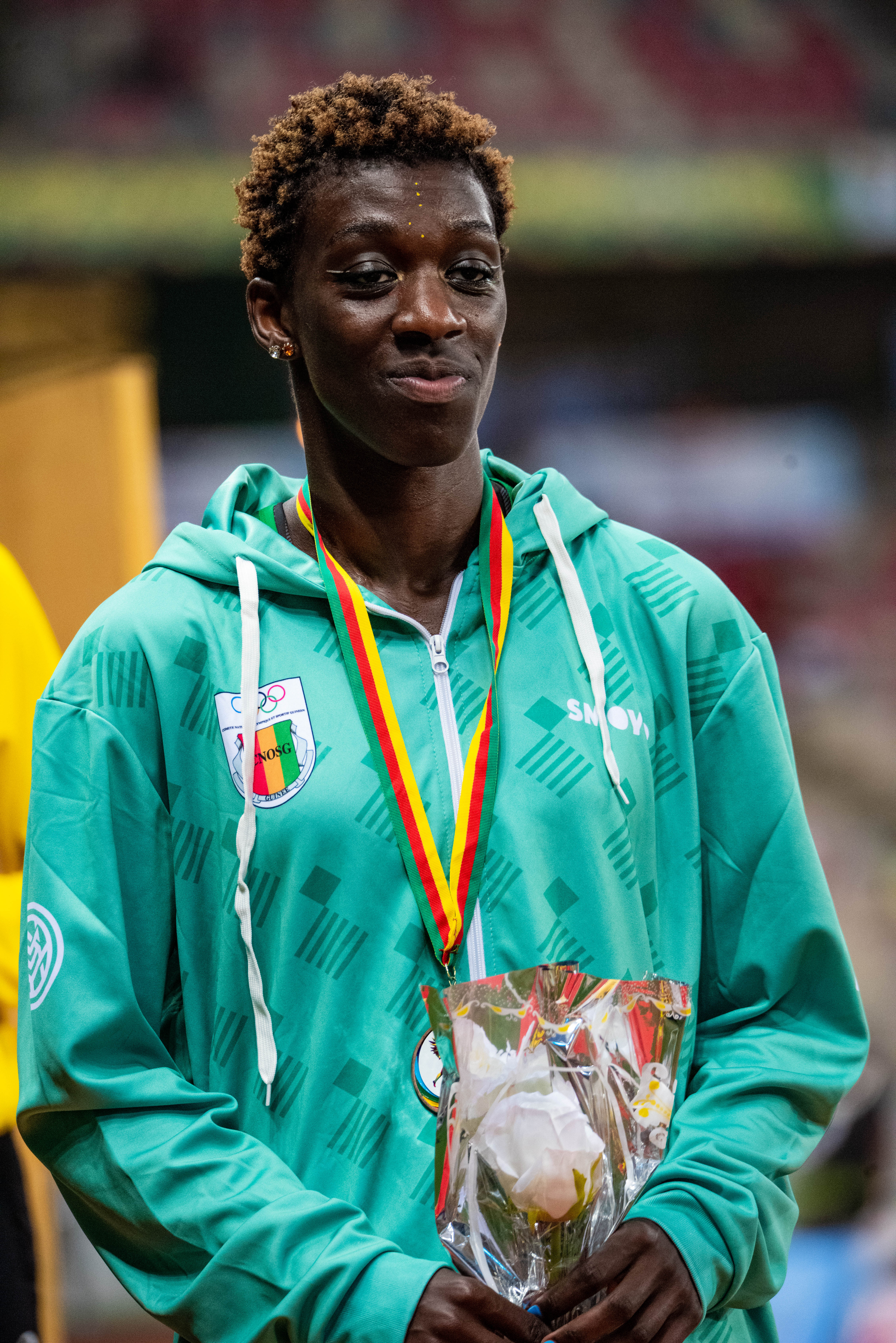
- Balley in 2024

Personal information
- Born: 9 April 1997 (age 29)

Sport
- Country: Guinea
- Sport: Athletics
- Event: High jump

Achievements and titles
- Personal best: High jump: 1.93m (2026) NR
Medal record
Women's athletics
Representing Guinea
African Games
Silver medal – second place	2023 Accra	High jump
African Championships
Bronze medal – third place	2024 Douala	High jump
Jeux de la Francophonie
Gold medal – first place	2023 Kinshasa	High jump
Islamic Solidarity Games
Silver medal – second place	2025 Riyadh	High jump

Fatoumata Balley (born 9 April 1997) is a Guinean high jumper. The national record holder, she was a finalist at the 2025 World Athletics Championships and a silver medalist at the African Games in Accra in 2023.

== Career ==
Balley was born in Conakry, Guinea but moved to France at an early age. She had the option to represent France in international competitions but chose to compete for the country of her birth.

She is a member of Amiens UC Athletics in Amiens, France. She set a personal best of 1.86 metres for the high jump competing in Amiens in June 2023. She won the gold medal in the high jump at the 2023 Francophone Games in Kinshasa, Democratic Republic of Congo.

She won the silver medal at the delayed 2023 African Games held in Accra, Ghana in March 2024. She won the bronze medal at the 2024 African Championships in Douala, Cameroon in June 2024

She was selected to compete at the 2025 World Athletics Championships in Tokyo, Japan, where she qualified for the final and placed twelfth overall.

Balley set a new personal best and Guinea national record of 1.92 metres at the Hirson High Jump Meeting, a World Athletics Indoor Tour Challenger meeting, in January 2026. In June 2026, Balley equaled her personal best and Guinea national record of 1.92 metres at the Tag der Überflieger Meeting in Essen, Germany, and then set a new personal best and Guinea national record of 1.93 metres at the Boris Hanžeković Memorial meeting in Zagreb.
