= Oussama Khennoussi =

Algerian athlete (born 1999)

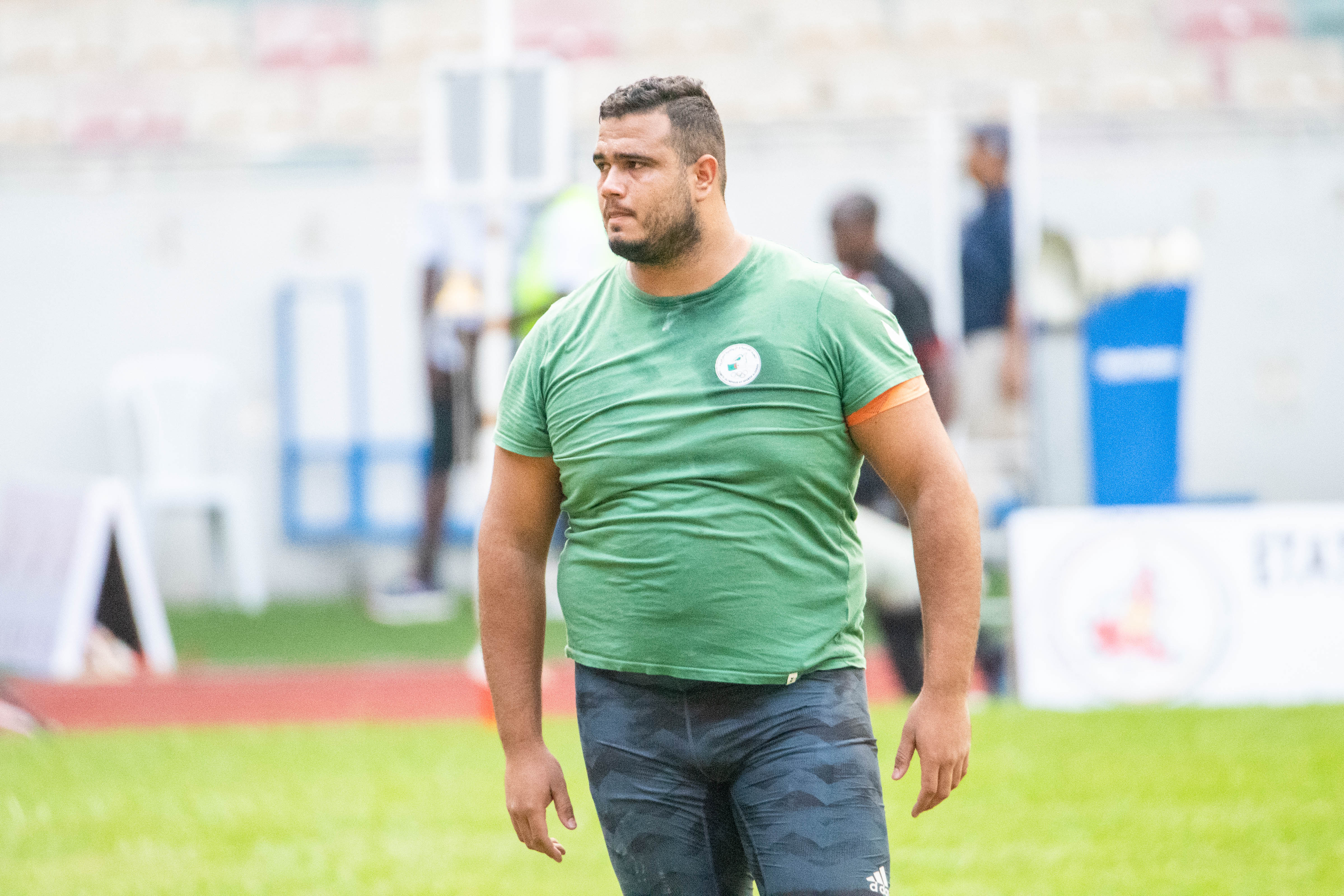
- Khennoussi in 2024

Personal information
- Nationality: Algerian
- Born: 28 December 1999 (age 26) Chlef, Algeria
- Height: 2.00 m (6 ft 7 in)

Sport
- Sport: Athletics
- Event: Discus

Achievements and titles
- Personal bests: Discus: 64.54m (Algeria, 2025) NR
Medal record
Athletics
Representing Algeria
African Games
Silver medal – second place	2023 Accra	Discus throw
African Championships
Gold medal – first place	2024 Douala	Discus throw
World University Games
Bronze medal – third place	2023 Chengdu	Discus throw
Arab Games
Bronze medal – third place	2023 Oran	Discus
Arab Championships
Gold medal – first place	2025 Oran	Discus
Islamic Solidarity Games
Bronze medal – third place	2021 Konya	Discus

Oussama Khennoussi (born 28 December 1999) is an Algerian track and field athlete who is national record holder in the discus throw.

== Early life ==
From Chlef Province, he was initially a volleyball player before transitioning to discus.

== Career ==
In June 2022, he came seventh at the African Championships. Khennoussi became Algerian national champion in the discus for the first time on 31 July 2022, in Dély Ibrahim. He was a bronze medalist at the Islamic Solidarity Games in Konya in August 2022 with a throw of 60.59 metres.

In June 2023, he increased his personal best throw to 61.78 metres in Veszprém, Hungary. He retained the Algerian national title in Algiers in July 2023. That month, he was a bronze medalist at the 2023 Arab Games in Bir El Djir. In August 2023, he was a bronze medalist in the discuss at the World University Games in Chengdu, with a throw of 61.33 metres.

Khennoussi was a silver medalist in the discus at the 2023 African Games in Accra with a throw of 59.97 metres.

He competed in the discus throw at the 2024 Summer Olympics in Paris in August 2024.

In May 2025, he won the discus competition at the 2025 Arab Athletics Championships in Oran.
